= List of Royal Air Force aircraft independent flights =

This is a list of Royal Air Force independent Flights. An independent Flight is a military administrative structure which is used to command flying units where the number of aircraft is not large enough to warrant a fully fledged squadron.

== RAF Coastal based numbered Flights 1918–1929 ==
(Flying Boat) Flights
- 300, 306, 309, 310, 311, 318, 319, 320, 321, 322, 324, 325, 326, 327, 328, 329, 330, 333, 334, 335, 336, 337, 339, 341, 345, 346, 347, 348, 349, 350, 351, 352, 353, 357, 358, 359, 360, 361, 362, 363, 367

(Seaplane) Flights

- 400, 401, 402, 403, 404, 405, 406, 407, 408, 409, 410, 412, 413, 414, 415, 416, 417, 418, 419, 420, 421, 424, 425, 426, 427, 428, 429, 430, 431, 432, 433, 434, 435, 436, 437, 438, 439, 440, 441, 442, 443, 444, 445, 446, 447, 448, 449, 450, 451, 452, 453, 454, 455

(Fighter) Flights

- 470, 471, 472, 473, 474, 475, 476, 477, 478, 479, 480, 481, 482, 483, 484, 485, 486, 487

(Light Bomber) Flights

- 490, 491, 492, 493, 494, 495, 496, 497, 498, 499

(Special Duty) Flights

- 500, 501, 502, 503, 504, 505, 506, 507, 508, 509, 510, 511, 512, 513, 514, 515, 516, 517, 518, 519, 520, 521, 522, 523, 524, 525, 526, 527, 528, 529, 530, 531, 532, 533

(Light Bomber) Flights

- 534, 550, 551, 552, 553, 554, 555, 556, 557, 558, 559, 560, 561

(Anti-Submarine) Flights

- No. 562 (Anti-Submarine) Flight RAF

== Royal Air Force Numbered Flights 1923–36 ==
later Fleet Air Arm of the RAF numbered Flights.

Flight	Formed at	Formed on	Disbanded at	Disbanded on	Notes
No. 401 (Fleet Fighter) Flight RAF	RAF Leuchars	1 April 1923	RAF Netheravon	3 April 1933	Renamed No. 401 (Fleet Fighter) Flight FAA from 1 April 1924. Became 801 Naval Air Squadron.
No. 402 (Fleet Fighter) Flight RAF	RAF Leuchars	1 April 1923	RAF Netheravon	3 April 1933	Renamed No. 402 (Fleet Fighter) Flight FAA from 1 April 1924. Became 800 Naval Air Squadron
No. 403 (Fleet Fighter) Flight RAF	RAF Leuchars	1 April 1923	RAF Kai Tak, Hong Kong	15 July 1936	Renamed No. 403 (Fleet Fighter) Flight FAA from 1 April 1924. Became No. 715 (Catapult) Flight FAA
No. 404 (Fleet Fighter) Flight RAF	RAF Leuchars	1 July 1923	RAF Netheravon	3 April 1933	Renamed No. 404 (Fleet Fighter) Flight FAA from 1 April 1924. Became 800 Naval Air Squadron.
No. 405 (Fleet Fighter) Flight FAA	RAF Leuchars	31 May 1924	RAF Netheravon	3 April 1933	Became 803 Naval Air Squadron
No. 406 (Fleet Fighter) Flight FAA	RAF Leuchars	31 May 1924	RAF Seletar, Malaya	15 July 1936	Became No. 714 (Catapult) Fight FAA
No. 407 (Fleet Fighter) Flight FAA	RNAS Donibristle	1 September 1927	RAF Mount Batten	15 July 1936	Became No. 712 (Catapult) Flight FAA
No. 408 (Fleet Fighter) Flight FAA	RNAS Donibristle	30 March 1929	Aboard; HMS Glorious	3 April 1933	Became 802 Naval Air Squadron
No. 409 (Fleet Fighter) Flight FAA	RAF Gosport	7 October 1932	Aboard; HMS Glorious	3 April 1933	Became 802 Naval Air Squadron
No. 420 (Fleet Spotter) Flight RAF	RAF Gosport	1 April 1923	Aboard; HMS Glorious	26 April 1929	Renamed No. 420 (Fleet Spotter) Flight FAA from 1 April 1924. Became No. 449 (Fleet Spotter Reconnaissance) Flight FAA.
No. 421 (Fleet Spotter) Flight RAF	RAF Gosport	1 April 1923	Aboard; HMS Glorious	26 April 1929	Renamed No. 421 (Fleet Spotter) Flight FAA from 1 April 1924. Became No. 447 (Fleet Spotter Reconnaissance) Flight FAA.
No. 422 (Fleet Spotter) Flight RAF	RAF Gosport	1 April 1923	Aboard; HMS Argus	26 April 1929	Renamed No. 422 (Fleet Spotter) Flight FAA from 1 April 1924. Became No. 450 (Fleet Spotter Reconnaissance) Flight FAA.
No. 423 (Fleet Spotter) Flight RAF	RAF Gosport	21 November 1923	Aboard; HMS Eagle	26 April 1929	Renamed No. 423 (Fleet Spotter) Flight FAA from 1 April 1924. Became No. 448 (Fleet Spotter Reconnaissance) Flight FAA.
No. 440 (Fleet Reconnaissance) Flight RAF	RAF Leuchars	1 May 1923	RAF Kai Tak, Hong Kong	11 June 1933	Renamed No. 440 (Fleet Reconnaissance) Flight FAA from 1 April 1924. Absorbed by 824 Naval Air Squadron.
No. 441 (Fleet Reconnaissance) Flight RAF	RAF Leuchars	1 April 1923	Aboard; HMS Glorious	3 April 1933	Renamed No. 441 (Fleet Reconnaissance) Flight FAA from 1 April 1924. Became 823 Naval Air Squadron.
No. 442 (Fleet Reconnaissance) Flight RAF	RAF Leuchars	1 April 1923	RAF Netheravon	3 April 1933	Renamed No. 442 (Fleet Reconnaissance) Flight FAA from 1 April 1924. Became 822 Naval Air Squadron.
No. 443 (Fleet Reconnaissance) Flight RAF	RAF Leuchars	21 May 1923	RAF Mount Batten	15 July 1936	Renamed No. 443 (Fleet Reconnaissance) Flight FAA from 1 April 1924. Became No. 716 (Catapult) Flight FAA and No. 718 (Catapult) Flight FAA.
No. 444 (Fleet Reconnaissance) Flight RAF	RNAS Lee-on-Solent	15 January 1925	RAF Kalafrana, Malta	15 July 1936	Renamed No. 444 (Fleet Reconnaissance) Flight FAA from 1 April 1924. Became No. 701 (Catapult) Flight FAA and No. 705 (Catapult) Flight FAA.
No. 445 (Fleet Reconnaissance) Flight RAF	RAF Leuchars	1 September 1927	RAF Mount Batten	15 July 1936	Renamed No. 445 (Fleet Reconnaissance) Flight FAA from 30 August 1935. Became No. 713 (Catapult) Flight FAA.
No. 446 (Fleet Reconnaissance) Flight FAA	RAF Leuchars	1 September 1927	RAF Gosport	3 April 1933	Became 821 Naval Air Squadron.
No. 447 (Fleet Spotter Reconnaissance) Flight FAA	Aboard; HMS Furious	26 April 1929	RAF Kalafrana, Malta	15 July 1936	Divided to form No. 701 (Catapult) Flight FAA and No. 711 (Catapult) Flight FAA.
No. 448 (Fleet Spotter Reconnaissance) Flight FAA	Aboard; HMS Eagle	26 April 1929	Aboard; HMS Glorious	3 April 1933	Became 823 Naval Air Squadron.
No. 449 (Fleet Spotter Reconnaissance) Flight FAA	Aboard; HMS Furious	26 April 1929	RAF Netheravon	3 April 1933	Became 822 Naval Air Squadron.
No. 450 (Fleet Spotter Reconnaissance) Flight FAA	?	26 April 1929	RAF Gosport	3 April 1933	Became 820 Naval Air Squadron.
No. 460 (Fleet Torpedo) Flight RAF	RAF Gosport	1 April 1923	RAF Gosport	3 April 1933	Became 824 Naval Air Squadron
No. 461 (Fleet Torpedo) Flight RAF	RAF Gosport	1 April 1923	RAF Gosport	3 April 1933	Became 812 Naval Air Squadron
No. 462 (Fleet Torpedo) Flight FAA	RAF Gosport	31 May 1924	RAF Gosport	3 April 1933	Became 812 Naval Air Squadron
No. 463 (Fleet Torpedo) Flight FAA	RAF Gosport	1 September 1927	RAF Gosport	3 April 1933	Became 810 Naval Air Squadron
No. 464 (Fleet Torpedo) Flight FAA	RAF Gosport	1 September 1927	RAF Gosport	3 April 1933	Became 810 Naval Air Squadron
No. 465 (Fleet Torpedo) Flight FAA	RAF Gosport	20 March 1931	RAF Gosport	3 April 1933	Became 811 Naval Air Squadron
No. 466 (Fleet Torpedo) Flight FAA	RAF Gosport	31 March 1931	RAF Gosport	3 April 1933	Became 811 Naval Air Squadron

== Fleet Air Arm of the RAF numbered Flights ==
- No. 701 (Catapult) Flight FAA (became 701 Naval Air Squadron) (1936–39)
- No. 702 (Catapult) Flight FAA (became 702 Naval Air Squadron) (1936–39)
- No. 705 (Catapult) Flight FAA (became 705 Naval Air Squadron) (1936–39)
- No. 711 (Catapult) Flight FAA (became 711 Naval Air Squadron) (1936–39)
- No. 712 (Catapult) Flight FAA (became 712 Naval Air Squadron) (1936–39)
- No. 713 (Catapult) Flight FAA (became 713 Naval Air Squadron) (1936–39)
- No. 714 (Catapult) Flight FAA (became 714 Naval Air Squadron) (1936–39)
- No. 715 (Catapult) Flight FAA (became 715 Naval Air Squadron) (1936–39)
- No. 716 (Catapult) Flight FAA (became 716 Naval Air Squadron) (1936–39)
- No. 718 (Catapult) Flight FAA (became 718 Naval Air Squadron) (1936–39)
- No. 720 (Catapult) Flight FAA (became 720 Naval Air Squadron) (1936–39)

== Numbered flights RAF 1940 on ==
- No. 416 (Army Co-operation) Flight RAF (1940 & 1940) became No. 231 Squadron RAF
- No. 417 (General Reconnaissance) Flight RAF (1940–41) became No. 1417 (General Reconnaissance) Flight RAF
- No. 418 (Fighter) Flight RAF (1940) became No. 261 Squadron RAF
- No. 420 (Pandora) Flight RAF (1940) became No. 93 Squadron RAF – formed to trial aerial mines
- No. 421 (Reconnaissance) Flight RAF (1940–41) became No. 91 Squadron RAF
- No. 422 (Fighter Interception) Flight RAF (1940) became No. 96 Squadron RAF
- No. 430 (Army Co-operation) Flight RAF (1940–41) became No. 1430 (Army Co-operation) Flight RAF
- No. 431 (General Reconnaissance) Flight RAF (1940–41) became No. 69 Squadron RAF
- No. 1115 Flight RAF (2004–07) became 'A' Flight of No. 39 Squadron in January 2007
- No. 1310 (Tactical Support) Flight RAF (1983–86 & 1995–?)
- No. 1310 (Transport) Flight RAF (1944 & 1953) became No. 1310 Flight RAF
- No. 1310 Flight RAF (1964–66) became No. 1310 (Tactical Support) Flight RAF
- No. 1311 (Transport) Flight RAF (1944 & 1953–54) became 'Supply' Flight of No. 267 Squadron RAF
- No. 1312 (In-Flight Refuelling) Flight RAF (1983–present) supporting air defence of Falkland Islands
- No. 1312 (Transport Support) Flight RAF(1954–57)
- No. 1312 (Transport) Flight RAF (1944)
- No. 1314 (Transport) Flight RAF (1944–45) became West Africa Transport and Communication Squadron RAF
- No. 1315 (Transport) Flight RAF (1945–46)
- No. 1316 (Dutch) Flight RAF (1944-??)
- No. 1316 (Transport) Flight RAF (??-1946)
- No. 1317 (Training) Flight RAF (1945)
- No. 1318 (Communication) Flight RAF (1944–46)
- No. 1320 ('Abdullah') Flight RAF (1944)
- No. 1321 Flight RAF (1957–58)
- No. 1321 (Valiant/Blue Danube Trials) Flight RAF (1954–56) became No. 1321 Flight RAF
- No. 1321 Bomber (Defence) Training Flight RAF (1944) became No. 1321 (Valiant/Blue Danube Trials) Flight RAF
- No. 1322 (Air Despatch Letter Service) Flight RAF (1944) became Air Despatch Letter Service Squadron RAF
- No. 1323 (Automatic Gun Laying Training) Flight RAF (1944–45) became No. 1323 (Canberra) Flight RAF
- No. 1323 (Canberra) Flight RAF (1953–55) became No. 542 Squadron RAF
- No. 1325 (Transport) Flight RAF (1956–60)
- No. 1340 (Anti-Mau Mau) Flight RAF (1953–55)
- No. 1341 (Radio Countermeasures) Flight RAF (1945)
- No. 1342 (Rocket Projectile) Flight RAF (1945)
- No. 1343 (Conversion) Flight RAF (1945)
- No. 1345 (Anti-Malarial) Flight RAF (1945–46)
- No. 1353 (Anti-Aircraft Co-operation) Flight RAF (1945–46)
- No. 1354 (DDT Spraying) Flight RAF (1945) became No. 1354 (Special Duties) Flight RAF
- No. 1354 Spray (Insecticide) Flight RAF (1945–46)
- No. 1355 (Communications) Flight RAF (1945)
- No. 1356 (Communications) Flight RAF (1945)
- No. 1357 (Pampa) Flight RAF (1946)
- No. 1358 (Pampa) Flight RAF (1946)
- No. 1359 (VIP Transport) Flight RAF (1945–46)
- No. 1360 (Helicopter) Flight RAF (1957–58) became No. 217 Squadron RAF
- No. 1416 (Reconnaissance) Flight RAF (1941) became No. 140 Squadron RAF
- No. 1417 (Communication) Flight RAF (1953–1958) became No. 152 Squadron RAF
- No. 1417 (Fighter Reconnaissance) Flight RAF (1963–67)
- No. 1417 (General Reconnaissance) Flight RAF (1941) became No. 1417 (Leigh Light Trials) Flight RAF
- No. 1417 (Leigh Light Trials) Flight RAF (1942) became No. 172 Squadron RAF
- No. 1417 (Tactical Ground Attack) Flight RAF (1980–93)
- No. 1420 Flight RAF (1941)
- No. 1422 (Night Fighter) Flight RAF (1941–44) became 'Special Projectile' Flight, Royal Aircraft Establishment
- No. 1423 (Fighter) Flight RAF (1941–43)
- No. 1424 (Air Observation Post) Flight RAF (1941–42) became No. 43 OTU
- No. 1425 (Communication) Flight RAF (1941–42) became No. 511 Squadron RAF
- No. 1426 (Enemy Aircraft Circus) Flight RAF (1941–45) nicknamed "Rafwaffe" tested enemy aircraft
- No. 1426 (Photographic Reconnaissance) Flight RAF (1956)
- No. 1429 (Czechoslovak Operational Training) Flight RAF (1942–43) became 'Czechoslovak' Flight, No. 6 OTU
- No. 1430 (Army Co-operation) Flight RAF (1941) became No. 185 Squadron RAF
- No. 1430 (Flying Boat Transport) Flight RAF (1946) became No. 88 Squadron RAF
- No. 1431 Flight RAF
- No. 1432 (Photographic Reconnaissance) Flight RAF (1942–43)
- No. 1433 (Meteorological/Photographic) Flight RAF (1942–43)
- No. 1434 (Photographic Survey) Flight RAF (1942–43)
- No. 1434 (Target Towing) Flight RAF (1945)
- No. 1435 (Fighter) Flight RAF (1942) became No. 1435 Squadron RAF
- No. 1435 (Night Fighter) Flight RAF (1941–42)
- No. 1435 Flight RAF (1983–85; 1988–present)
- No. 1436 (Balloon) Flight RAF (Mk.VI Balloon) (1941–44)
- No. 1437 (Strategic Reconnaissance) Flight RAF (1941–43)
- No. 1438 (Strategic Reconnaissance) Flight RAF (1942–43)
- No. 1439 (Communication Support) Flight RAF (1957)
- No. 1439 (Strategic Reconnaissance) Flight RAF (1942)
- No. 1441 (Combined Operations Development) Flight RAF (1942–43) became No. 516 Squadron RAF
- No. 1449 (Fighter) Flight RAF (1942–44)
- No. 1451 (Fighter) Flight RAF (1941–42) became No. 530 Squadron RAF
- No. 1452 (Fighter) Flight RAF (1941–42) became No. 531 Squadron RAF
- No. 1453 (Airborne Early Warning) Flight RAF (1953–56)
- No. 1453 (Fighter) Flight RAF (1941–42) became No. 532 Squadron RAF
- No. 1453 (Tactical Ground Attack) Flight RAF (1983–85)
- No. 1454 (Fighter) Flight RAF (1941–42) became No. 533 Squadron RAF
- No. 1455 (Fighter) Flight RAF (1941–42) became No. 534 Squadron RAF
- No. 1456 (Fighter) Flight RAF (1941–42) became No. 535 Squadron RAF
- No. 1457 (Fighter) Flight RAF (1941–42) became No. 536 Squadron RAF
- No. 1458 (Fighter) Flight RAF (1941–42) became No. 537 Squadron RAF
- No. 1459 (Fighter) Flight RAF (1941–42) became No. 538 Squadron RAF
- No. 1460 (Fighter) Flight RAF (1941–42) became No. 539 Squadron RAF
- No. 1471 (Anti-Aircraft Co-operation) Flight RAF (1942)
- No. 1472 (Army Co-operation) Flight RAF (1942–43)
- No. 1473 (Radio Countermeasures) Flight RAF (1942–44) became 'C' Flight of No. 192 Squadron RAF
- No. 1475 (Training) Flight RAF (1942–43)
- No. 1476 (Advanced Ship Recognition) Flight RAF (1943–44)
- No. 1477 (Norwegian) Flight RAF (1943) became No. 333 Squadron RAF
- No. 1478 (Mediterranean Air Command Communication) Flight RAF (1943) became Mediterranean Air Command Communication Unit RAF
- No. 1478 Flight RAF (1943) became No. 1478 (Mediterranean Air Command Communication) Flight RAF
- No. 1479 (Anti-Aircraft Co-operation) Flight RAF (1942–43) became No. 598 Squadron RAF
- No. 1480 (Anti-Aircraft Co-operation) Flight RAF (1941–43) became No. 290 Squadron RAF
- No. 1481 (Bomber) Gunnery Flight RAF (1942–44)
- No. 1481 (Target Towing and Gunnery) Flight RAF (1942) became No. 1481 (Bomber) Gunnery Flight RAF
- No. 1481 (Target Towing) Flight RAF (1941–42) became No. 1481 (Target Towing and Gunnery) Flight RAF
- No. 1482 (Bomber) Gunnery Flight RAF (1942–44) became No. 2 Group Support Unit RAF
- No. 1482 (Target Towing and Gunnery) Flight RAF (1941–42) became No. 1482 (Bomber) Gunnery Flight RAF
- No. 1483 (Bomber) Gunnery Flight RAF (1942–44) became No. 1688 Bomber (Defence) Training Flight RAF
- No. 1483 (Target Towing and Gunnery) Flight RAF (1941–42) became No. 1483 (Bomber) Gunnery Flight RAF
- No. 1484 (Bomber) Gunnery Flight RAF (1942–44) became No. 1689 Bomber (Defence) Training Flight RAF
- No. 1484 (Target Towing and Gunnery) Flight RAF (1942) became No. 1484 (Bomber) Gunnery Flight RAF
- No. 1484 (Target Towing) Flight RAF (1941–42) became No. 1484 (Target Towing and Gunnery) Flight RAF
- No. 1485 (Bomber) Gunnery Flight RAF (1942–44) became No. 1690 Bomber (Defence) Training Flight RAF
- No. 1485 (Target Towing and Gunnery) Flight RAF (1942) became No. 1485 (Bomber) Gunnery Flight RAF
- No. 1485 (Target Towing) Flight RAF (1941–42) became No. 1485 (Target Towing and Gunnery) Flight RAF
- No. 1486 (Fighter) Gunnery Flight RAF (1942–43) became No. 12 Armament Practice Camp RAF
- No. 1486 (Target Towing) Flight RAF (1941–42) became No. 1486 (Fighter) Gunnery Flight RAF
- No. 1487 (Fighter) Gunnery Flight RAF (1942–43) became No. 11 Armament Practice Camp RAF
- No. 1487 (Target Towing) Flight RAF (1941–42) became No. 1487 (Fighter) Gunnery Flight RAF
- No. 1488 (Fighter) Gunnery Flight RAF (1942–43) became No. 17 Armament Practice Camp RAF
- No. 1488 (Target Towing) Flight RAF (1941–42) became No. 1488 (Fighter) Gunnery Flight RAF
- No. 1489 (Fighter) Gunnery Flight RAF (1942–43) became No. 16 Armament Practice Camp RAF
- No. 1489 (Target Towing) Flight RAF (1941–42) became No. 1489 (Fighter) Gunnery Flight RAF
- No. 1490 (Fighter) Gunnery Flight RAF (1942–43) became No. 14 Armament Practice Camp RAF
- No. 1490 (Target Towing) Flight RAF (1941–42) became No. 1490 (Fighter) Gunnery Flight RAF
- No. 1491 (Fighter) Gunnery Flight RAF (1942–43) became No. 15 Armament Practice Camp RAF
- No. 1491 (Target Towing) Flight RAF (1941–42) became No. 1491 (Fighter) Gunnery Flight RAF
- No. 1492 (Target Towing) Flight RAF (1941–43) became No. 13 Armament Practice Camp RAF
- No. 1493 (Fighter) Gunnery Flight RAF (1942–43) became No. 18 Armament Practice Camp RAF
- No. 1493 (Target Towing) Flight RAF (1941–42) became No. 1493 (Fighter) Gunnery Flight RAF
- No. 1494 (Target Towing) Flight RAF (1941–45)
- No. 1495 (Target Towing) Flight RAF (1942–43)
- No. 1497 (Target Towing) Flight RAF (1942–43)
- No. 1498 (Target Towing) Flight RAF (1942–43) became No. 11 Armament Practice Camp RAF
- No. 1499 (Bomber) Flight RAF (1943–44)
- No. 1500 (Target Towing) Flight RAF (1943–46)
- No. 1508 (Acclimatisation) Flight RAF (1945–46)
- No. 1508 (GEE Training) Flight RAF (1944) became 'C' Flight of No. 62 OTU
- No. 1563 (Helicopter) Flight RAF (1963–72) became No. 84 Squadron RAF
- No. 1563 (Tactical Support) Flight RAF (1983–94)
- No. 1563 Flight RAF (2022–23) became No. 230 Squadron
- No. 1564 (Helicopter) Flight RAF (1963–66 & 1969–70)
- No. 1564 (Tactical Support) Flight RAF (1983–86) became No. 78 Squadron RAF
- No. 1571 (Ground Gunnery) Flight RAF (1943–44) became No. 20 Armament Practice Camp RAF
- No. 1572 (Ground Gunnery) Flight RAF (1943–44) became No. 21 Armament Practice Camp RAF
- No. 1573 (Ground Gunnery) Flight RAF (1943–44) became No. 22 Armament Practice Camp RAF
- No. 1574 (Target Facilities) Flight RAF (1964-??) became No. 1574 (Target Towing) Flight RAF
- No. 1574 (Target Towing) Flight RAF (19??-70)
- No. 1577 (Airborne Experimental) Flight RAF (1945)
- No. 1577 (Glider Development) Flight RAF (1944–45) became No. 1577 (Airborne Experimental) Flight RAF
- No. 1577 Flight RAF (1943) became No. 1577 Heavy Bomber Flight (Special Duties) RAF
- No. 1584 (Heavy Bomber Conversion) Flight RAF (1943) became No. 1584 (Heavy Bomber) Conversion Unit RAF
- No. 1587 (AOP Refresher) Flight RAF (1944–45) became 'C' Flight of No. 659 Squadron RAF
- No. 1588 (Heavy Freight) Flight RAF (1945–46)
- No. 1589 (Heavy Freight) Flight RAF (1945–46)
- No. 1600 (Anti-Aircraft Co-operation) Flight RAF (1942–43) became No. 587 Squadron RAF
- No. 1601 (Anti-Aircraft Co-operation) Flight RAF (1942–43) became No. 587 Squadron RAF
- No. 1602 (Anti-Aircraft Co-operation) Flight RAF (1942–43) became No. 639 Squadron RAF
- No. 1603 (Anti-Aircraft Co-operation) Flight RAF (1942–43) became No. 639 Squadron RAF
- No. 1604 (Anti-Aircraft Co-operation) Flight RAF (1942–43) became No. 639 Squadron RAF
- No. 1605 (Anti-Aircraft Co-operation) Flight RAF (1942–43) became No. 631 Squadron RAF
- No. 1606 (Anti-Aircraft Co-operation) Flight RAF (1943–45)
- No. 1607 (Anti-Aircraft Co-operation) Flight RAF (1943–43) became No. 595 Squadron RAF
- No. 1608 (Anti-Aircraft Co-operation) Flight RAF (1942–43) became No. 595 Squadron RAF
- No. 1609 (Anti-Aircraft Co-operation) Flight RAF (1942–43) became No. 595 Squadron RAF
- No. 1611 (Anti-Aircraft Co-operation) Flight RAF (1942–43) became No. 695 Squadron RAF
- No. 1612 (Anti-Aircraft Co-operation) Flight RAF (1942–43) became No. 695 Squadron RAF
- No. 1613 (Anti-Aircraft Co-operation) Flight RAF (1942–43) became No. 291 Squadron RAF
- No. 1614 (Anti-Aircraft Co-operation) Flight RAF (1942–43) became No. 650 Squadron RAF
- No. 1616 (Anti-Aircraft Co-operation) Flight RAF (1942–43) became No. 679 Squadron RAF
- No. 1617 (Anti-Aircraft Co-operation) Flight RAF (1942–43) became No. 290 Squadron RAF
- No. 1618 (Anti-Aircraft Co-operation) Flight RAF (1942–43)
- No. 1620 (Anti-Aircraft Co-operation) Flight RAF (1942–43)
- No. 1621 (Anti-Aircraft Co-operation) Flight RAF (1942–43)
- No. 1622 (Anti-Aircraft Co-operation) Flight RAF (1943–43) became No. 691 Squadron RAF
- No. 1623 (Anti-Aircraft Co-operation) Flight RAF (1943) became No. 691 Squadron RAF
- No. 1624 (Anti-Aircraft Co-operation) Flight RAF (1943) became No. 567 Squadron RAF
- No. 1625 (Anti-Aircraft Co-operation) Flight RAF (1943) became No. 587 Squadron RAF
- No. 1626 (Anti-Aircraft Co-operation) Flight RAF (1943) became No. 695 Squadron RAF
- No. 1627 (Anti-Aircraft Co-operation) Flight RAF (1943) became No. 679 Squadron RAF
- No. 1628 (Anti-Aircraft Co-operation) Flight RAF (1943) became No. 631 Squadron RAF
- No. 1629 (Anti-Aircraft Co-operation) Flight RAF (1943) became No. 291 Squadron RAF
- No. 1630 (Anti-Aircraft Co-operation) Flight RAF (1943) became No. 291 Squadron RAF
- No. 1631 (Anti-Aircraft Co-operation) Flight RAF (1943) became No. 667 Squadron RAF
- No. 1632 (Anti-Aircraft Co-operation) Flight RAF (1943) became No. 598 Squadron RAF
- No. 1634 (Anti-Aircraft Co-operation) Flight RAF (1943) became No. 291 Squadron RAF
- No. 1676 (Target Towing) Flight RAF (1943) became Fighter Defence Flight RAF, Gibraltar
- No. 1678 (Heavy Conversion) Flight RAF (1943) became No. 1678 Heavy Conversion Unit RAF
- No. 1679 Heavy Conversion Flight RAF (1943–44)
- No. 1680 (Transport) Flight RAF (1944–46)
- No. 1680 (Western Isles Communication) Flight RAF (1943–44) became No. 1680 (Transport) Flight RAF
- No. 1681 Bomber (Defence) Flight RAF (1943–44)
- No. 1682 Bomber (Defence) Flight RAF (1943–44)
- No. 1683 Bomber (Defence) Flight RAF (1943–44)
- No. 1684 Bomber (Defence) Flight RAF (1943–44)
- No. 1685 Bomber (Defence) Flight RAF (1943–44)
- No. 1686 Bomber (Defence) Flight RAF (1943–44)
- No. 1687 Bomber (Defence) Flight RAF (1944–46)
- No. 1688 Bomber Defence Training Flight RAF (1944–46)
- No. 1689 Bomber (Defence) Training Flight RAF (1944–45)
- No. 1690 Bomber (Defence) Flight RAF (1944–45)
- No. 1691 Bomber (Gunnery) Flight RAF (1943–44) became No. 1695 Bomber (Defence) Training Flight RAF
- No. 1692 (Bomber Support Training) Flight RAF (1943–45)
- No. 1693 (General Reconnaissance) Flight RAF (1943–45)
- No. 1694 (Target Towing) Flight RAF (1944) became No. 1694 Bomber (Defence) Training Flight RAF
- No. 1694 Bomber (Defence) Training Flight RAF (1944–45)
- No. 1695 Bomber (Defence) Training Flight RAF (1944–45)
- No. 1696 Bomber (Defence) Training Flight RAF (1944–45)
- No. 1697 (Air Despatch Letter Service) Flight RAF (1944–45)
- No. 1699 (Fortress Training) Flight RAF (1944) became No. 1699 (Training) Flight RAF

== A ==
=== Air Experience Flights ===
- 1 Air Experience Flight (1958–95)
- 2 Air Experience Flight (1958–)
- 3 Air Experience Flight (1958–)
- 4 Air Experience Flight (1958–95 & 1997–)
- 5 Air Experience Flight (1958–)
- 6 Air Experience Flight (1958–)
- 7 Air Experience Flight (1958–)
- 8 Air Experience Flight (1958–)
- 9 Air Experience Flight (1958–)
- 10 Air Experience Flight (1958–)
- 11 Air Experience Flight (1958–)
- 12 Air Experience Flight (1958–96)
- 13 Air Experience Flight (1958–96)

=== Air Observation Post Flights ===
- No. 1900 Air Observation Post Flight RAF (1947–57) became No. 20 Independent Reconnaissance Flight AAC
- No. 1901 Air Observation Post Flight RAF (1947–57) became No. 1 Reconnaissance Flight AAC
- No. 1902 Air Observation Post Flight RAF (1947–48 & 1948–57) became No. 2 Reconnaissance Flight AAC
- No. 1903 Air Observation Post Flight RAF (1947–48) became No. 1905 Air Observation Post Flight RAF
- No. 1903 Air Observation Post Flight RAF (1948–57) became No. 3 Reconnaissance Flight AAC
- No. 1904 Air Observation Post Flight RAF (1947–57) became No. 4 Reconnaissance Flight AAC
- No. 1905 Air Observation Post Flight RAF (1948-57) became No. 5 Reconnaissance Flight AAC
- No. 1906 Air Observation Post Flight RAF (1947) became No. 1910 Air Observation Post Flight RAF
- No. 1906 (Helicopter) Flight RAF (1950–57) became No. 6 Independent Depot/Liaison Flight AAC
- No. 1907 Air Observation Post Flight RAF (1947 & 1948–53) became No. 1907 Light Liaison Flight RAF
- No. 1907 Light Liaison Flight RAF (1953–57) became No. 7 Reconnaissance Flight AAC
- No. 1908 Independent Air Observation Post Flight RAF (1946–55 & 1955–57) became No. 8 (Independent) Reconnaissance Flight AAC
- No. 1909 Air Observation Post Flight RAF (1946–48 & 1951–57) became No. 9 Reconnaissance Flight AAC
- No. 1910 Air Observation Post Flight RAF (1947–57) became No. 10 Reconnaissance Flight AAC
- No. 1911 Air Observation Post Flight RAF (1950-52) became No. 1911 Light Liaison Flight RAF
- No. 1911 Light Liaison Flight RAF (1952–57) became No. 11 Reconnaissance/Liaison Flight AAC
- No. 1912 Continuation Training Flight RAF (1951–5?) became No. 1912 (Glider Training) Flight RAF
- No. 1912 (Glider Training) Flight RAF (195?–52) became No. 1912 Light Liaison Flight RAF
- No. 1912 Light Liaison Flight RAF (195?–54) became Light Liaison Flight RAF
- Light Liaison Flight RAF (1954-57) became No. 12 Independent Liaison Flight AAC
- No. 1913 (Air Observation Post) Flight RAF (1951–52) became No. 1913 Light Liaison Flight RAF
- No. 1913 Light Liaison Flight RAF (1952–57) became No. 13 Liaison Flight AAC
- No. 1914 Air Observation Post Flight RAF (1947–57) became No. 14 Reconnaissance/Liaison Flight AAC
- No. 1915 Light Liaison Flight RAF (1956–57) became No. 15 Independent Liaison Flight AAC
- No. 1951 Reserve Air Observation Post Flight RAF (1949–57)
- No. 1952 Reserve Air Observation Post Flight RAF (1949–57)
- No. 1953 Reserve Air Observation Post Flight RAF (1949–57)
- No. 1954 Reserve Air Observation Post Flight RAF (1949–57)
- No. 1955 Reserve Air Observation Post Flight RAF (1949–57)
- No. 1956 Reserve Air Observation Post Flight RAF (1949–57)
- No. 1957 Reserve Air Observation Post Flight RAF (1949–57)
- No. 1958 Reserve Air Observation Post Flight RAF (1949–57)
- No. 1959 Reserve Air Observation Post Flight RAF (1949–57)
- No. 1960 Reserve Air Observation Post Flight RAF (1949–57)
- No. 1961 Reserve Air Observation Post Flight RAF (1949–57)
- No. 1962 Reserve Air Observation Post Flight RAF (1949–57)
- No. 1963 Reserve Air Observation Post Flight RAF (1949–57)
- No. 1964 Reserve Air Observation Post Flight RAF (1949–57)
- No. 1965 Reserve Air Observation Post Flight RAF (1949–57)
- No. 1966 Reserve Air Observation Post Flight RAF (1949–57)
- No. 1967 Reserve Air Observation Post Flight RAF (1951–57)
- No. 1968 Reserve Air Observation Post Flight RAF (1949–57)
- No. 1969 Reserve Air Observation Post Flight RAF (1949–57)
- No. 1970 Reserve Air Observation Post Flight RAF (1949–57)

=== Air Sea Rescue Flights ===
- Air Sea Rescue Flight RAF (1942–43) became No. 294 Squadron RAF
- No. 1 Air Sea Rescue Flight (Far East) RAF (1945) became No. 1346 (Air Sea Rescue) Flight RAF
- No. 2 Air Sea Rescue Flight (Far East) RAF (1945) became No. 1347 (Air Sea Rescue) Flight RAF
- No. 3 Air Sea Rescue Flight (Far East) RAF (1945) became No. 1348 (Air Sea Rescue) Flight RAF
- No. 4 Air Sea Rescue Flight (Far East) RAF (1945) became No. 1349 (Air Sea Rescue) Flight RAF
- No. 5 Air Sea Rescue Flight (Far East) RAF (1945) became No. 1350 (Air Sea Rescue) Flight RAF
- No. 1 Air Sea Rescue Flight (North Africa) RAF (1943–44)
- No. 5 Air Sea Rescue Flight (North Africa) RAF (1943-??)
- No. 6 Air Sea Rescue Flight (North Africa) RAF (1943-??)
- No. 1346 (Air Sea Rescue) Flight RAF (1945–46)
- No. 1347 (Air Sea Rescue) Flight RAF (1945–46)
- No. 1348 (Air Sea Rescue) Flight RAF (1945–46)
- No. 1349 (Air Sea Rescue) Flight RAF (1945–46)
- No. 1350 (Air Sea Rescue) Flight RAF (1945)
- No. 1351 (Air Sea Rescue) Flight RAF (1945–46)
- No. 1352 (Air Sea Rescue) Flight RAF (1945–46)
- Malta Air Sea Rescue and Communication Flight RAF (1943) became Malta Communication, Ferry Unit and Air Sea Rescue Flight RAF
- Air Sea Rescue Flight RAF, Hawkinge (1941) became 'B' Flight, No. 277 Squadron RAF
- Air Sea Rescue Flight RAF, Martlesham Heath (1941) became 'A' Flight, No. 277 Squadron RAF
- Air Sea Rescue Flight RAF, Matlaske (1941) became No. 278 Squadron RAF
- Air Sea Rescue Flight RAF, Merston/Westhampnett (1941)
- Air Sea Rescue Flight RAF, Pembrey/Fairwood Common (1941) became 'D' Flight, No. 276 Squadron RAF
- Air Sea Rescue Flight RAF, Perranporth (1941) became 'C' Flight, No. 276 Squadron RAF
- Air Sea Rescue Flight RAF, Roborough (1941)
- Air Sea Rescue Flight RAF, Shoreham/Friston/Shoreham (1941) became 'C' Flight, No. 277 Squadron RAF
- Air Sea Rescue Flight RAF, Warmwell (1941) became No. 276 Squadron RAF
- Sea Rescue Flight RAF (1941–42) became Air Sea Rescue Flight RAF
- Search and Rescue Flight RAF, Khormaksar (1958–67)
- Search and Rescue Flight RAF, Muharraq (1959–71)

=== Aircraft Delivery Flights ===
- 1 Aircraft Delivery Flight (1941–45)
- 2 Aircraft Delivery Flight (1941–44)
- 3 Aircraft Delivery Flight (1941–44)
- 4 Aircraft Delivery Flight (1941–45)

== B ==
=== Beam Approach Training Flights ===
- Beam Approach Calibration Flight RAF (to Blind Approach Calibration Flight) (1941–42)
- Beam Approach Training Flight RAF, Church Lawford (1942)
- Beam Approach Training Flight RAF, Nanyuki (194?-42)

=== Blind Approach Training Flights ===
- Blind Approach Calibration Flight RAF (from Beam Approach Calibration Flight) (1941)

== C ==
=== Coast Defence / Co-operation Flights ===
- No. 1 Coast Artillery Co-operation Flight RAF (1936–37) became No. 1 Coastal Artillery Co-operation Unit RAF
- No. 1 Coast Defence Flight, Indian Air Force Volunteer Reserve (1940–42) became No. 101 (Coast Defence) Flight, Indian Air Force
- No. 2 Coast Defence Flight, Indian Air Force Volunteer Reserve (1940–42) became No. 102 (Coast Defence) Flight, Indian Air Force
- No. 3 Coast Defence Flight, Indian Air Force Volunteer Reserve (1940–42) became No. 103 (Coast Defence) Flight, Indian Air Force
- No. 4 Coast Defence Flight, Indian Air Force Volunteer Reserve (1940–42) became No. 104 (Coast Defence) Flight, Indian Air Force
- No. 5 Coast Defence Flight, Indian Air Force Volunteer Reserve (1940–42) became No. 105 (Coast Defence) Flight, Indian Air Force
- No. 6 Coast Defence Flight, Indian Air Force Volunteer Reserve (1940–42) became No. 106 (Coast Defence) Flight, Indian Air Force
- No. 1 Coastal Patrol Flight RAF (1939–40)
- No. 2 Coastal Patrol Flight RAF (1939–40)
- No. 3 Coastal Patrol Flight RAF (1939–40)
- No. 4 Coastal Patrol Flight RAF (1939–40)
- No. 5 Coastal Patrol Flight RAF (1939–40)
- No. 6 Coastal Patrol Flight RAF (1940)
- Coastal Battery Co-operation Flight RAF (1919–21)
- Coastal Battery Co-operation School Flight RAF (1919) became Coastal Battery Co-operation Flight RAF
- Coast Defence Co-operation Flight RAF (1924–33) became Coast Defence Training Flight RAF
- Coast Defence Torpedo Training Flight RAF (1928) became No. 36 Squadron RAF
- Coast Defence Training Flight RAF (1933) became No. 1 Coastal Defence Training Unit RAF
- Coastal Reconnaissance Beaufighter Flight RAF (1933-??)

== Meteorological flights ==
- No. 1 Meteorological Flight RAF (1943) became No. 1300 (Meteorological) Flight RAF
- No. 2 Meteorological Flight RAF (1943) became No. 1301 (Meteorological) Flight RAF
- No. 3 Meteorological Flight RAF (1943) became No. 1302 (Meteorological) Flight RAF
- No. 4 Meteorological Flight RAF (1943) became No. 1303 (Meteorological) Flight RAF
- No. 401 (Meteorological) Flight RAF (1941) became No. 1401 (Meteorological) Flight RAF
- No. 402 (Meteorological) Flight RAF (1941) became No. 1402 (Meteorological) Flight RAF
- No. 403 (Meteorological) Flight RAF (1940–41) became No. 1403 (Meteorological) Flight RAF
- No. 404 (Meteorological) Flight RAF (1940–41) became No. 1404 (Meteorological) Flight RAF
- No. 405 (Meteorological) Flight RAF (1941) became No. 1405 (Meteorological) Flight RAF
- No. 1300 (Meteorological Reconnaissance) Flight RAF (1946–47) became No. 18 Squadron RAF
- No. 1300 (Meteorological THUM) Flight RAF (19??-46) became No. 1300 (Meteorological Reconnaissance) Flight RAF
- No. 1300 (Meteorological) Flight RAF (1943-??) became No. 1300 (Meteorological THUM) Flight RAF
- No. 1301 (Meteorological) Flight RAF (1943–46 & 1949–51)
- No. 1302 (Meteorological) Flight RAF (1943–46)
- No. 1303 (Meteorological) Flight RAF (1943–46)
- No. 1361 (Meteorological) Flight RAF (1946)
- No. 1362 (Meteorological) Flight RAF (1946 & 1955–58)
- No. 1363 (Meteorological) Flight RAF (1946)
- No. 1364 (Meteorological) Flight RAF (1946)
- No. 1401 (Meteorological) Flight RAF – combined with 1403 to form 521 Squadron in 1942. Reformed in 1943. (1941–42 & 1943–46)
- No. 1402 (Meteorological) Flight RAF (1941–45 & 1946–46)
- No. 1403 (Meteorological) Flight RAF (1941–42 & 1943) became No. 520 Squadron RAF
- No. 1404 (Meteorological) Flight RAF (1941–43) became No. 517 Squadron RAF
- No. 1405 (Meteorological) Flight RAF (1941–42)
- No. 1406 (Meteorological) Flight RAF (1941–43) became No. 519 Squadron RAF
- No. 1407 (Meteorological) Flight RAF (1941–44) became No. 521 Squadron RAF
- No. 1408 (Meteorological) Flight RAF (1941–42)
- No. 1409 (Meteorological) Flight RAF (1943–45) became No. 1409 (Long Range Meteorological Reconnaissance) Flight RAF
- No. 1411 (Meteorological) Flight RAF (1942–43)
- No. 1412 (Meteorological) Flight RAF (1942–46)
- No. 1413 (Meteorological) Flight RAF (1942–46)
- No. 1414 (Meteorological) Flight RAF (1941–46)
- No. 1415 (Meteorological) Flight RAF (1942–46)
- No. 1560 (Meteorological) Flight RAF (1942–45)
- No. 1561 (Meteorological) Flight RAF (1943–45 & 1945–46)
- No. 1562 (Meteorological) Flight RAF (1943–45 & 1945–46)
- No. 1563 (Meteorological) Flight RAF (1942–46)
- No. 1564 (Meteorological) Flight RAF (1943–46)
- No. 1565 (Meteorological) Flight RAF (1943–46)
- No. 1566 (Meteorological) Flight RAF (1943–46)
- No. 1567 (Meteorological) Flight RAF (1943–46)
- No. 1568 (Meteorological) Flight RAF (1944–46)
- No. 1569 (Meteorological) Flight RAF (1944–45)
- Air Ministry Meteorological Flight Aldergrove (1936–39) became 'C' Flight, Station Flight Aldergrove
- Meteorological Flight RAF, Heliopolis (1941–42) became No. 1411 (Meteorological) Flight RAF
- Meteorological Flight RAF, Khartoum (1941–42) became No. 1412 (Meteorological) Flight RAF
- Meteorological Flight RAF, Ramleh (1941–42) became No. 1413 (Meteorological) Flight RAF
- Meteorological Research Flight RAF (1946–2001)
- Royal Air Force Meteorological Flight Eastchurch, Duxford and Mildenhall (1924–41) became No. 401 (Meteorological) Flight RAF
- Temperature and Humidity Flight RAF (1951–58)
- Transport Command Meteorological Flight RAF (19??)

== Seaplane Training Flights ==
- 'A' Boat Seaplane Training Flight
- 'B' Boat Seaplane Training Flight
- 'C' Boat Seaplane Training Flight
- 'D' Boat Seaplane Training Flight
- 'E' Boat Seaplane Training Flight
- 'F' Boat Seaplane Training Flight
- 'G' Boat Seaplane Training Flight
- Seaplane Flight RAF, Basra (1928–29)

== Specific Aircraft Type Flights ==
- No. 1 Queen Bee Flight RAF (1937) became 'D' Flight, No. 1 Anti-Aircraft Co-operation Unit RAF
- Andover Training Flight RAF (1966–70)
- Blenheim Flight RAF (1941)
- Buccaneer Training Flight RAF (1991–92)
- Canberra Standardisation and Training Flight RAF (1990–91) became No. 231 Operational Conversion Unit RAF
- Catalina Flight, Aden (1942–44)
- Fortress Flight (1942)
- Gladiator Flight (1940)
- Hudson Flight RAF, West Africa (1942–44)
- Lancaster Finishing Flight RAF (1944–45)
- Lightning Augmentation Flight (1981–87)
- Lightning Training Flight RAF (1975–87)
- Lysander Flight (1939-??)
- Oxford Test Flight (1945–46)
- Victor Flight (1974–75)
- Victor (B.2) Training Flight (1962–70) became No. 232 Operational Conversion Unit RAF
- Vulcan Display Flight RAF (??-1992)
- Wellington Flight, Malta (1940) became No. 148 Squadron RAF
- Wessex Training Flight (1980–82)

== Special Flights ==
Special Duty/Duties

- Special Duties Flight RAF, Baginton (1941)
- Special Duties Flight RAF, Sculthorpe (RB-45C Tornados at RAF Sculthorpe) (1952)
- Special Duty Flight RAF, Invergordon (1940)
- Special Duty Flight RAF, Malta (1941–42)
- Special Duty Flight RAF, Northolt (1942) became No. 515 Squadron RAF
- Special Duty Flight RAF, Old Sarum/Netheravon/Boscombe Down (1926–46) became 'D' Squadron, Aeroplane and Armament Experimental Establishment
- Special Duty Flight, Royal Flying Corps (1917–18) became 'I' Flight
- Special Duty Flight RAF, St Athan, Martlesham Heath and Christchurch (1939–41) became Telecommunications Flying Unit RAF
- No. 419 (Special Duties) Flight RAF (1940–41) became No. 1419 (Special Duties) Flight RAF
- No. 1340 (Special Duties) Flight RAF (1944–46)
- No. 1341 (Special Duties) Flight RAF (1944–45)
- No. 1354 (Special Duties) Flight RAF (1945) became No. 1354 Spray (Insecticide) Flight RAF
- No. 1418 (Special Duties) Flight RAF (1942) became Bombing Development Unit RAF
- No. 1419 (Special Duties) Flight RAF (1941) became No. 138 Squadron RAF
- No. 1474 (Special Duties) Flight RAF (1942–43) became No. 192 Squadron RAF
- No. 1575 (Special Duties) Flight RAF (1943)
- No. 1576 (Special Duties) Flight RAF (1943–44) became 'A' Flight of No. 357 Squadron RAF
- No. 1577 Heavy Bomber (Special Duties) Flight RAF (1943–44) became No. 1577 (Glider Development) Flight RAF
- No. 1586 (Polish Special Duties) Flight RAF (1943–44) became No. 301 Squadron RAF
- No. 1692 (Special Duties) Flight RAF (1943) became No. 1692 (Bomber Support Training) Flight RAF
- Catalina Special Duty Flight RAF (1944–45)

Other Special flights

- No. 160 (Special) Flight RAF (1944–45)
- No. 1344 (Special Signals) Flight RAF (1945)
- Special Experimental Flight RAF (1918–19)
- Special Instruction Flight RAF (1920)
- Special Operations (Liberator) Flight RAF (1942–43)
- Special Performance Flight RAF, Aboukir (1942)
- Special Service Flight RAF, Northolt (1942–43)
- Special Survey Flight RAF (1939–40)
- Special Transport Flight RAF (1947–49)

== Miscellaneous Flights ==
- 'B' Flight, Palestine
- 'G' Flight
- 'H' Flight
- 'I' Flight
- 'J' Flight
- 'K' Flight
- 'M' Flight
- 'N' Flight
- 'O' Flight
- 'P' Flight (1)
- 'P' Flight (2)
- 'Q' Flight
- 'Sparrow' Ambulance Flight RAF (1944–45)
- 'V' Flight
- 'W' Flight
- 'X' Flight (1940 – Palestine)
- 'X' Flight (RFC/RAF)
- 'Y' Flight
- 'Z' Flight
- No. 1 Chain Home Low Flight RAF (Unknown)
- No. 1 Engine Control Instruction Flight RAF (1944–45) became School of Flight Efficiency RAF
- No. 1 Free French (Bomber) Flight RAF (1940–41)
- No. 1 Gunnery Co-Operation Flight RAF (1934–37) became No. 2 Anti-Aircraft Co-operation Unit RAF
- No. 2 Gunnery Co-Operation Flight RAF (1939–37) became No. 3 Anti-Aircraft Co-operation Unit RAF
- No. 2 (Training) Flight, Kenya Auxiliary Air Unit (1939–40) became Elementary Flying Training School (Kenya)
- No. 3 (Reconnaissance) Flight, Kenya Auxiliary Air Unit (1939-??)
- 2nd Tactical Air Force Instrument Training Flight (1951–54)
- No. 60 (Photographic Survey) Squadron, South African Air Force – Royal Air Force Flight (1941–42) became No. 1434 (Photographic Survey) Flight RAF
- Aden Command Training Flight RAF (1940–42)
- Aden Conversion Flight RAF (1945)
- Aden Defence Flight RAF (1920–28)
- Aden Protectorate Reconnaissance Flight RAF (1959) became Arabian Peninsular Reconnaissance Flight RAF
- Aden Protectorate Support Flight RAF (1947–50 & 1952–55) became Aden Protectorate Communication and Support Squadron RAF
- Advanced Ship Recognition Flight RAF (1942–43) became No. 1476 (Advanced Ship Recognition) Flight RAF
- Air Command Far East All-Weather Flight RAF (1948–50) became Far East Air Force Examining Squadron RAF
- Air Command Far East Instrument Flying Training Flight RAF (1948) became Air Command Far East All-Weather Flight RAF
- Air Depot Hinaidi Training Flight RAF (1929–30) became Communication Flight Iraq and Persia RAF
- Air Headquarters Iraq Command Training Flight RAF (1927–28)
- Air Movements Development Flight RAF (1958) became Air Movements Development Unit RAF
- air observation post Training Flight / Team (1943–44)
- Air Pilotage Flight RAF (1923–26 & 1933) became Air Pilotage School RAF
- Air Training Corps Flight RAF (1943–46)
- Air-to-Surface Vessel (ASV) Training Flight RAF (1944–45)
- Airborne Interception Conversion Flight RAF, Cranfield and Twinwood Farm (1943-?)
- Airborne Interception Conversion Flight RAF, Italy (1944)
- Airborne interception Mk VIII Conversion Flight RAF (1943–44)
- Airborne interception Mk X Conversion Flight RAF (1944–45)
- Anti-locust Flight (Middle East) RAF (1944–46)
- Anti-locust Flight (Persia) RAF (1943–44) became Anti-locust Flight (Middle East) RAF
- Arabian Peninsular Reconnaissance Flight RAF (1959–60)
- Argus Flight RAF (1918–23)
- Artillery Flight RAF (1918) became 'L' Flight
- Autogyro Training Flight RAF (1940)
- Baltimore Photographic Flight RAF (1945)
- Bangalore Calibration Flight RAF (1942–43) became No. 1580 (Calibration) Flight RAF
- Battle Flight RAF (1940)
- Battle of Britain Flight RAF (1958–69) became Battle of Britain Memorial Flight
- Battle of Britain Memorial Flight (1969-)
- Bengal Calibration Flight RAF (1943) became No. 1583 (Calibration) Flight RAF
- Bomber Command Instrument Rating and Examining Flight RAF (1947–52)
- Bomber Command Jet Conversion Flight RAF (1950-?) became Bomber Command Jet Conversion Unit RAF
- Bomber Transport Flight RAF (1932–39)
- Bristol Wireless Flight RAF (1940–45)
- British Air Forces of Occupation Instrument Training Flight RAF (1950–51) became 2nd Tactical Air Force Instrument Training Flight RAF
- Camouflage Flight RAF (1939) became No. 1 Camouflage Unit RAF
- Casualty Air Evacuation Flight RAF (1950) became Far East Casualty Evacuation Flight RAF
- Centaurus Flight RAF (1943–45)
- Command Training Flight RAF (1961–64)
- DDT Spray Flight RAF (1945) became No. 1354 (DDT Spraying) Flight RAF
- Defence Flight RAF, Heliopolis (1942-?)
- Desert Air Force Training Flight RAF (1944) became No. 5 Refresher Flying Unit RAF
- Eagle Trials Flight RAF (1920)
- Emergency Flying Training Flight RAF (1939–40) became Headquarters Far East Communications Flight RAF
- Enemy Aircraft Flight RAF (1945)
- Engine Control Demonstration Flight RAF (1943) became No. 1 (Coastal) Engine Control Demonstration Unit RAF
- Experimental Flight, Upavon (1916) became Experimental Armament Squadron
- Extended Reconnaissance Flight RAF (1939)
- Famine Relief Flight RAF (1944)
- Far East Casualty Evacuation Flight RAF (1950–53) became No. 194 Squadron RAF
- Far East Flight (1927–29) became No. 205 Squadron RAF
- Fighter Command Instrument Rating Flight RAF (1956–60) became Fighter Command Instrument Rating Squadron RAF
- Fighter Command Instrument Training Flight RAF (1948–51) became Fighter Command Instrument Training Squadron RAF
- Fighter Command Vanguard Flight RAF (1952–53) became No. 1453 (Early Warning) Flight RAF
- Fighter Defence Flight RAF, Aden (1942–43)
- Fighter Defence Flight RAF, Gibraltar (1943–44) became 'C' Flight, No. 256 Squadron RAF
- Fighter Defence Flight RAF, Iraq (1943)
- Fighter Defence Flight RAF, Takoradi (1941–43)
- Fighter Experimental Flight RAF (1944–46)
- Fighter Flight RAF, Shetlands (1939–40) became Fighter Flight RAF, Sumburgh
- Fighter Flight RAF, Sumburgh (1940) became No. 247 Squadron RAF
- Fighter Pilots Practice Flight RAF, Blida (1943) became Advanced Flying Unit RAF, Setif
- Fighter Pilots Practice Flight RAF, Sétif (1943) became Advanced Flying Unit RAF, Setif
- Floatplane Flight RAF (1943)
- Floatplane Training Flight RAF (1938–39) became 765 Naval Air Squadron
- Flying Boat Development Flight RAF (1921–22 & 1924–32)
- Free French Flight RAF, Khartoum (1941)
- Free French Flight RAF, Sudan (1941)
- Gee-H Training Flight RAF (1944–46) became Bomber Command Radar School RAF
- General Purpose Flight RAF, Sheikh Othman (1940–41)
- Governor General's Flight RAF, Australia (1945–47)
- Greek Training Flight RAF (1941–42)
- Heavy Transport Flight RAF (1929–32) became Bomber Transport Flight RAF
- Helicopter Development Flight RAF (1954–56) became Helicopter Squadron RAF
- Helicopter Flight RAF, Nicosia (1955–1956) became No. 284 Squadron RAF
- Helicopter Training Flight RAF (1945–46)
- Heston Flight RAF (1939) became No. 2 Camouflage Unit RAF
- High Altitude Flight RAF, 244 Wing (1943)
- High Altitude Flight RAF, Northolt (1942) became Special Service Flight RAF, Northolt
- High Commissioners Flight RAF (1949–55)
- High Speed Flight RAF (1926–46)
- Historic Aircraft Flight RAF (1957–58) became Battle of Britain Flight RAF
- Home Command Instrument Training Flight RAF (1950–52)
- Home Defence Flight RAF, Cramlington (19??-16) became No. 36 Squadron Royal Flying Corps
- Hong Kong Auxiliary Flight RAF (1949–50) became Hong Kong Auxiliary Squadron RAF
- Intelligence Photographic Flight RAF (1940–41) became No. 2 Photographic Reconnaissance Unit RAF
- Internal Security Flight RAF, Nicosia (1955–56)
- Irish Flight RAF (1922)
- Jet Training Flight RAF (??-1963)
- Joint Services Staff College Flight RAF (1947–52)
- Kangaroo Flight RAF (1918) became No. 495 (Light Bomber) Flight RAF
- King's Flight RAF (1936–42 & 1946–53) became Queen's Flight RAF
- Long Range Flight RAF (1927–33)
- Manston Flight RAF (1941–42)
- Manston Naval Flight RAF (1918–19)
- Medical Flight RAF, Hendon (1917–18)
- Middle East Air Force Instrument Training Flight RAF (1950–56)
- Military Governor's Flight RAF (??-1949) became High Commissioners Flight RAF
- Navigation Flight RAF (1920–21)
- New Zealand Flight RAF (1939–40) became No. 75 Squadron RAF
- Night Flying Flight RAF (1923–31) became Anti-Aircraft Co-operation Flight RAF
- Ogaden Flight RAF (1944)
- Overseas Air Delivery Flight RAF (??-1940) became Overseas Aircraft Despatch Flight RAF
- Overseas Aircraft Despatch Flight RAF (1940–41) became Overseas Aircraft Despatch Unit RAF
- Overseas Aircraft Preparation Flight RAF (1941–42) became Overseas Aircraft Preparation Unit RAF
- Oxford University Flight RAF (1927) became Station Flight, Upper Heyford
- Palestine Truce Observance Flight RAF (1948–49)
- Polish Training and Grading Flight RAF (1940) became No. 1 (Polish) Flying Training School RAF
- Practice Flight RAF, Heliopolis (1928–38) became Communications Flight RAF, Heliopolis
- Practice Flight RAF, Home Aircraft Depot, Henlow (1927–34 & 1937–39)
- Queen's Flight RAF (1953–95) became No. 32 Squadron RAF
- Radar Meteorological Flight RAF (1946)
- Radar Reconnaissance Flight RAF (1951–63)
- Radar Training Flight RAF (1972–77)
- Radio Development Flight RAF (1942–43) became No. 1692 (Radio Development) Flight RAF
- Rapid Landing Flight RAF (1950)
- RDF Calibration Flight RAF, Blida (1943) became No. 1578 (Calibration) Flight RAF
- Reserve Command Instrument Training Flight RAF (1945–50) became Home Command Instrument Training Flight RAF
- ROC Flight RAF (1940)
- Rota Experiment Flight RAF (1939)
- Royal Air Force Antarctic Flight (1949–51)
- Royal Air Force Meteorological Flight RAF, Eastchurch, Duxford and Mildenhall (1924–41) became No. 401 (Meteorological) Flight RAF
- Royal Air Force Staff College Flight RAF (1922–27) became Andover Communication Flight RAF
- Royal Flying Corps Detached Flight, Moascar (-1915) became No. 30 Squadron Royal Flying Corps
- Royal Flying Corps Flight, Basra (1915)
- Royal Norwegian Navy Flight (1942–43) became No. 1477 (Norwegian) Flight RAF
- Seaplane Rescue Flight RAF, Kalafrana (1941)
- Secret Intelligence Service Flight RAF (-1939) became Heston Flight RAF
- Security Flight RAF, Ismailia (1945-??)
- Shipping Interception Flight RAF (1941–42)
- Signals Co-operation Flight RAF (1921–24) became No. 13 Squadron RAF
- Singapore Operational Training Flight RAF (1972–73)
- South African Air Observation Post Flight RAF (1945–45) became No. 42 Air Observation Post Flight, South African Air Force
- Spotter Flight RAF, Kai Tak (1939-??)
- Spotter Flight RAF, Seletar (1939)
- Supernumerary Camel Flight RAF (1918) became No. 487 (Fighter) Flight RAF
- Swifter Flight RAF (1959–60)
- Tanker Training Flight RAF (1965–69) became Victor Training Unit RAF
- Target Development Flight RAF (??-1944)
- Target Facilities Flight RAF, Binbrook (1966–73)
- Target Facilities Flight RAF, Leuchars (1966–73)
- Target Facilities Flight RAF, Wattisham (1966–73)
- Training Command Practice Flight RAF (1931–37 & 1940)
- Training Flight RAF, Halton (1934–39)
- Transport Command Development Flight RAF (1951–57)
- Transport Training Flight RAF (1942)
- Vintage Pair Flight RAF (1972–86)
- VISTRE Flight RAF (1946–52) became Joint Concealment Centre (Royal Air Force Element)
- Voice Flight RAF (1954–59)
- VVIP Flight RAF (1944–45)
- Wireless Direction Finding Flight RAF (1937–38) became Experimental Co-operation Unit RAF
- Wireless Flight RFC (1914) became No. 9 Squadron Royal Flying Corps
- Yatesbury Wireless Flight RAF (1940)
- Yugoslav Training Flight, Royal Air Force Element (1945)
- Yugoslav Training Flight RAF (1944) became Yugoslav Holding Unit RAF

== Target Towing Flights ==
- No. 1 RAF Regiment Anti-Aircraft Practice Camp Target Towing Flight (1943) became No. 1625 (Anti-Aircraft Co-operation) Flight RAF
- No. 2 RAF Regiment Anti-Aircraft Practice Camp Target Towing Flight (1943) became No. 1626 (Anti-Aircraft Co-operation) Flight RAF
- No. 3 RAF Regiment Anti-Aircraft Practice Camp Target Towing Flight (1943) became No. 1627 (Anti-Aircraft Co-operation) Flight RAF
- No. 4 RAF Regiment Anti-Aircraft Practice Camp Target Towing Flight (1943) became No. 1628 (Anti-Aircraft Co-operation) Flight RAF
- No. 5 RAF Regiment Anti-Aircraft Practice Camp Target Towing Flight (1943) became No. 1629 (Anti-Aircraft Co-operation) Flight RAF
- No. 6 RAF Regiment Anti-Aircraft Practice Camp Target Towing Flight (1943) became No. 1630 (Anti-Aircraft Co-operation) Flight RAF
- No. 7 RAF Regiment Anti-Aircraft Practice Camp Target Towing Flight (1943) became No. 1631 (Anti-Aircraft Co-operation) Flight RAF
- No. 8 RAF Regiment Anti-Aircraft Practice Camp Target Towing Flight (1943) became No. 1632 (Anti-Aircraft Co-operation) Flight RAF
- No. 1 RAF Regiment School Target Towing Flight (1942–43) became No. 1634 (Anti-Aircraft Co-operation) Flight RAF
- No. 3 RAF Regiment School Target Towing Flight (1942–43) became No. 1634 (Anti-Aircraft Co-operation) Flight RAF
- No. 1 Target Towing Flight RAF (19??-42) became Air Defence Co-operation Unit RAF
- No. 1 Target Towing Flight (India) RAF (1947)
- No. 2 Target Towing Flight (India) RAF (1947)
- Target Towing Flight RAF, Nicosia (19??-50) became Middle East Air Force Target Towing Unit RAF
- Target Towing Flight RAF, Shallufa RAF (1953–54) became Middle East Air Force Target Towing Unit RAF
- No. 1 Towed Target Flight RAF (1939–42) became Air Defence Co-operation Unit RAF
- Base and Target Towing Flight, Royal Air Force Maintenance Base (Far East), Seletar RAF (1953-??)
- Middle East Air Force Target Towing Flight RAF (1952–56)
- Station and Target Towing Flight RAF, Seletar (1951–53) became Base and Target Towing Flight, Royal Air Force Maintenance Base (Far East), Seletar RAF
- Towed Target Flight RAF, Bentwaters (1945)
- Towed Target Flight RAF, Changi (1962–64) became No. 1574 (Target Facilities) Flight RAF
- Towed Target Flight RAF, Gibraltar (1953–58)
- Towed Target Flight RAF, Helwan (1940)
- Towed Target Flight RAF, Ismailia (1935)
- Towed Target Flight RAF, Khartoum (1935)
- Towed Target Flight RAF, St. Eval (1953–55)
- Towed Target Flight RAF, Schleswigland (1953–58)
- Towed Target Flight RAF, Seletar (1951)
- Towed Target Flight RAF, Sutton Bridge (1940)
- Towed Target Flight RAF, Tangmere (1950–51)

== See also ==
Royal Air Force

- List of Royal Air Force aircraft squadrons
- List of Royal Air Force aircraft independent flights
- List of conversion units of the Royal Air Force
- List of Royal Air Force Glider units
- List of Royal Air Force Operational Training Units
- List of Royal Air Force schools
- List of Royal Air Force units & establishments
- List of RAF squadron codes
- List of RAF Regiment units
- List of Battle of Britain squadrons
- List of wings of the Royal Air Force
- Royal Air Force roundels

Army Air Corps

- List of Army Air Corps aircraft units

Fleet Air Arm

- List of Fleet Air Arm aircraft squadrons
- List of aircraft wings of the Royal Navy
- List of Fleet Air Arm groups
- List of aircraft units of the Royal Navy

Others

- List of Air Training Corps squadrons
- University Air Squadron
- Air Experience Flight
- Volunteer Gliding Squadron
- United Kingdom military aircraft registration number
- United Kingdom aircraft test serials
- British military aircraft designation systems
