= No. 1417 Flight RAF =

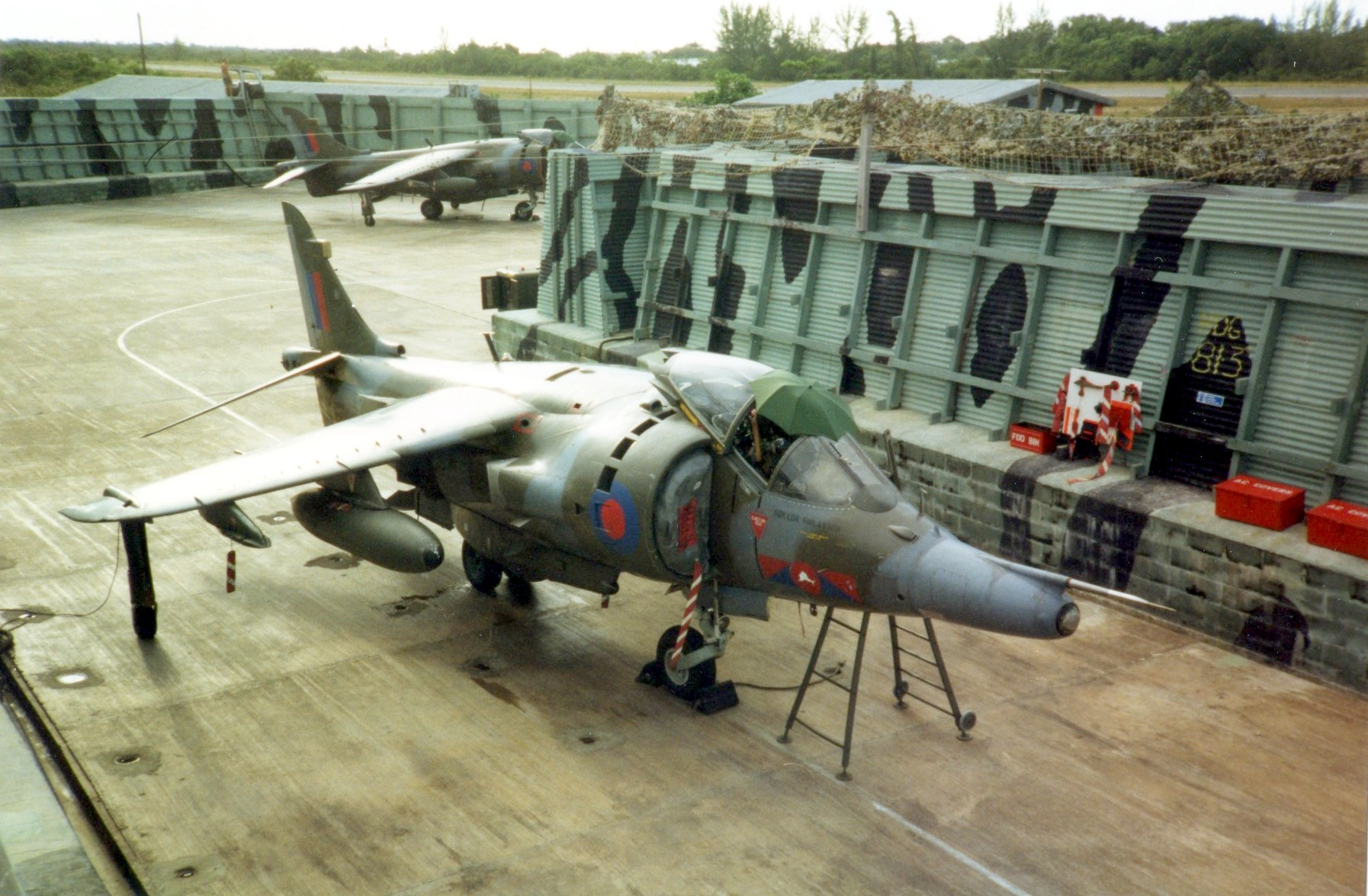
- Foxy-Golf (Foxtrot Golf) hide in 1990
- Active: 1 – 18 March 1941; 18 January – 4 April 1942; 1 Nov 1953 – 1 Oct 1958; 1 Mar 1963 – 8 Sep 1967; 18 Apr 1980 – 6 Jul 1993
- Country: United Kingdom
- Branch: Royal Air Force
- Type: Independent Flight
- Role: General Reconnaissance; Anti-Submarine Warfare; Communications; Fighter Reconnaissance; Ground Attack/Air Defence
- Bases: RAF St Athan; RAF Chivenor; RAF Muharraq; RAF Khormaksar; RAF Belize
- Aircraft: Avro Anson; Vickers Wellington; Percival Pembroke; Gloster Meteor; Hawker Hunter; Hawker Siddeley Harrier

No. 1417 Flight RAF (1417 Flt) was an independent flight of the Royal Air Force which existed between 1941 and 1993 at various times in a variety of roles. This Flight had probably the most interesting incarnations of all the independent aircraft flights of the Royal Air Force, introducing new technologies and operating complex fast jet aircraft in challenging and austere conditions, from the Arabian Peninsula to Central America.

== No. 1417 (General Reconnaissance) Flight ==
No. 1417 (General Reconnaissance) Flight (1417 (GR) Flt) was first formed at RAF St. Athan, from No. 417 (General Reconnaissance) Flight, on 1 March 1941 as a General Reconnaissance unit, flying Avro Anson I aircraft on maritime patrols. The flight had a very short life, being disbanded on 18 March 1941.

== No. 1417 (Leigh Light Trials) Flight ==
No. 1417 (Leigh Light Trials) Flight (1417 (LLT) Flt) was a Royal Air Force flight established to carry out trials and develop tactics for the use of ASV Radar/Leigh Light equipped Vickers Wellington GR Mk VIII maritime reconnaissance-bombers. Formed on 8 January 1942 at RAF Chivenor 1417 (LLT) Flt was re-formed as No. 172 Squadron from 4 April 1942 onwards.

== No. 1417 (Communication) Flight ==
No. 1417 (Communication) Flight (1417 (Comms) Flt) was re-incarnated on 1 November 1953, as a communications unit in the Middle East, at RAF Muharraq, Bahrain with Avro Anson XIX and Percival Pembroke C.1 aircraft. Once again (1417 Flt) formed the basis of a full squadron when No. 152 Squadron was formed at Bahrain on 1 October 1958 under the command of Flight Lieutenant F. Rimmer, flying Percival Pembroke C Mk.1 transport aircraft.

== Arabian Peninsular Reconnaissance Flight ==
From 1956 Gloster Meteor FR Mk.9 aircraft from No. 208 Squadron were deployed to Aden for operations against rebel tribesmen and Yemeni insurgents. This Squadron was withdrawn at the time of the Suez Crisis, but some aircraft returned from 1958 to 1960 operated by the Arabian Peninsular Reconnaissance Flight.

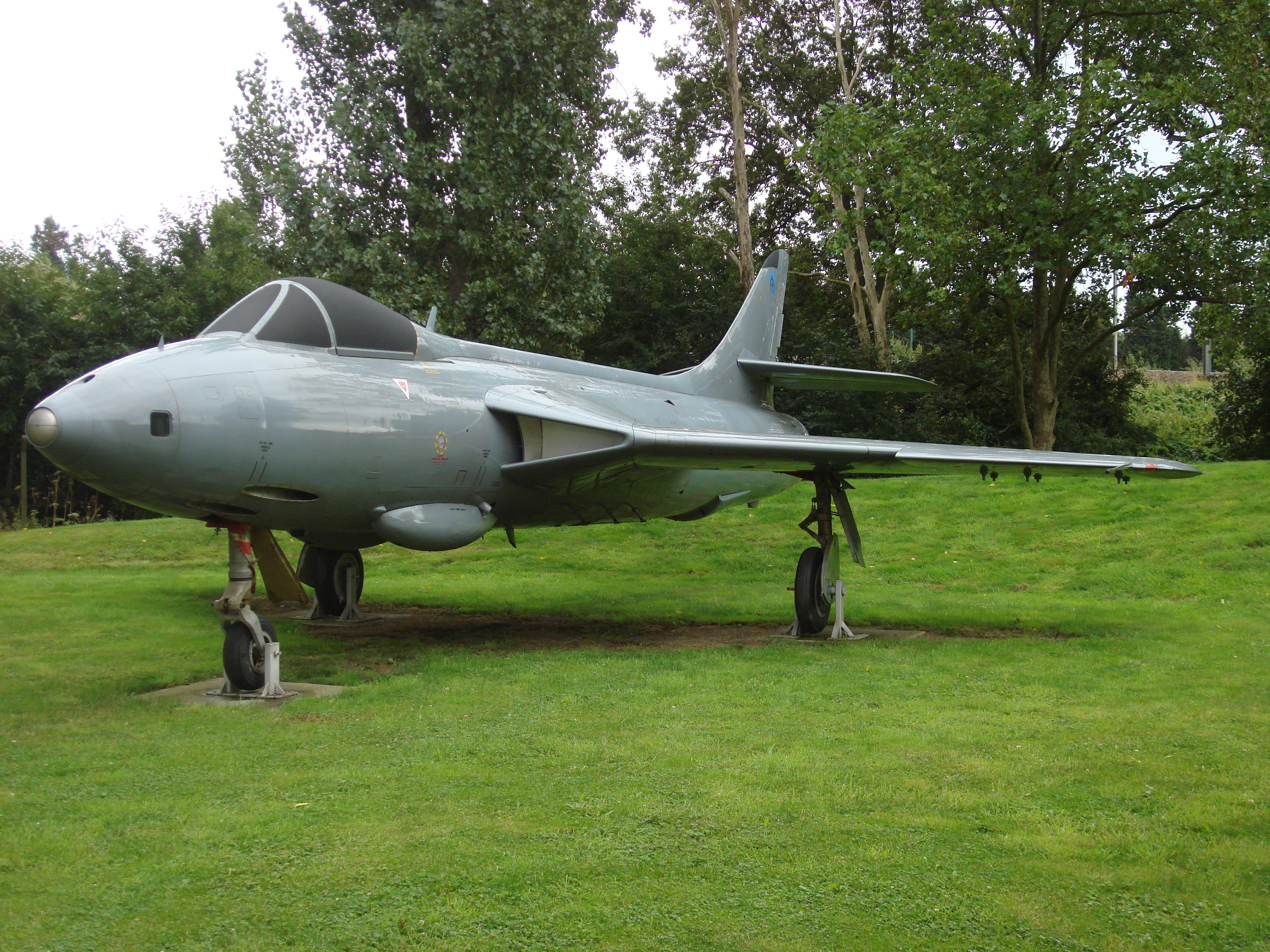
A Hunter FR.10 similar to those used on 1417 Flight.

The reconnaissance task at Aden was taken over by No. 8 Squadron from 1960, flying Hawker Hunter FGA Mk.9 and FR Mk.10 aircraft. Lack-lustre results from reconnaissance missions and difficulties maintaining the aircraft prompted the formation of a dedicated reconnaissance flight on 1 March 1963 as No. 1417 (Fighter Reconnaissance) Flight (1417 (FR) Flt), flying the five FR Mk.10 Hunters from No. 8 Squadron and a T Mk.7 two seat Hunter.

The five aircraft were given tactical codes to represent the initials of the five pilots: RP for Roger Pyrah, JM for Johnny Morris, PL for Peter Lewis, JD for Jim Dymond and GT for Geoff Timms. (Timms was to carry on flying fast jets well into his sixties, becoming probably the oldest active fast-jet pilot in the RAF, until retiring to the Harrier Simulator at RAF Wittering in the early 1990s.)

March 1965 was a busy month with the pilots, ground-crew and aircraft of No. 8 Squadron, plus two 1417 Flt FR.10s departing Khormaksar for a two-week detachment to RAF Masirah, an island in the Gulf of Oman, to undergo strike and photo reconnaissance training in an area not familiar to many pilots. The detachment left on 8 March 1965 and returned on 19 March 1965.

The following table of flying hours, for Khormaksar aircraft in March 1965, illustrates that the Hunter FR Mk.10's of 1417 (FR) Flt were well utilised, with each aircraft averaging well over 20 hours flying for that month.

Aircraft type	Allocation	Hours flown
Hunter FGA.9	25	662.35
Hunter FR.10	5	116.40
Hunter T.7	3	78.25
Shackleton MR.2	4	190.00
Total flying hours		1,047.40

A typical month saw 1417 (FR) Flt fly 63 reconnaissance missions in June 1964, which was quite an achievement considering there were only five pilots and five aircraft, with some on standby duty at up-country airfields and other normal flying and training being carried out simultaneously.

1417 (FR) Flt continued providing pre- and post-strike reconnaissance up to the draw-down of British forces in Aden. Missions were carried out on a daily basis until it was disbanded and re-absorbed into No. 8 Squadron on 8 September 1967, shortly after evacuating to RAF Muharraq at Bahrain.

== British Forces Belize ==
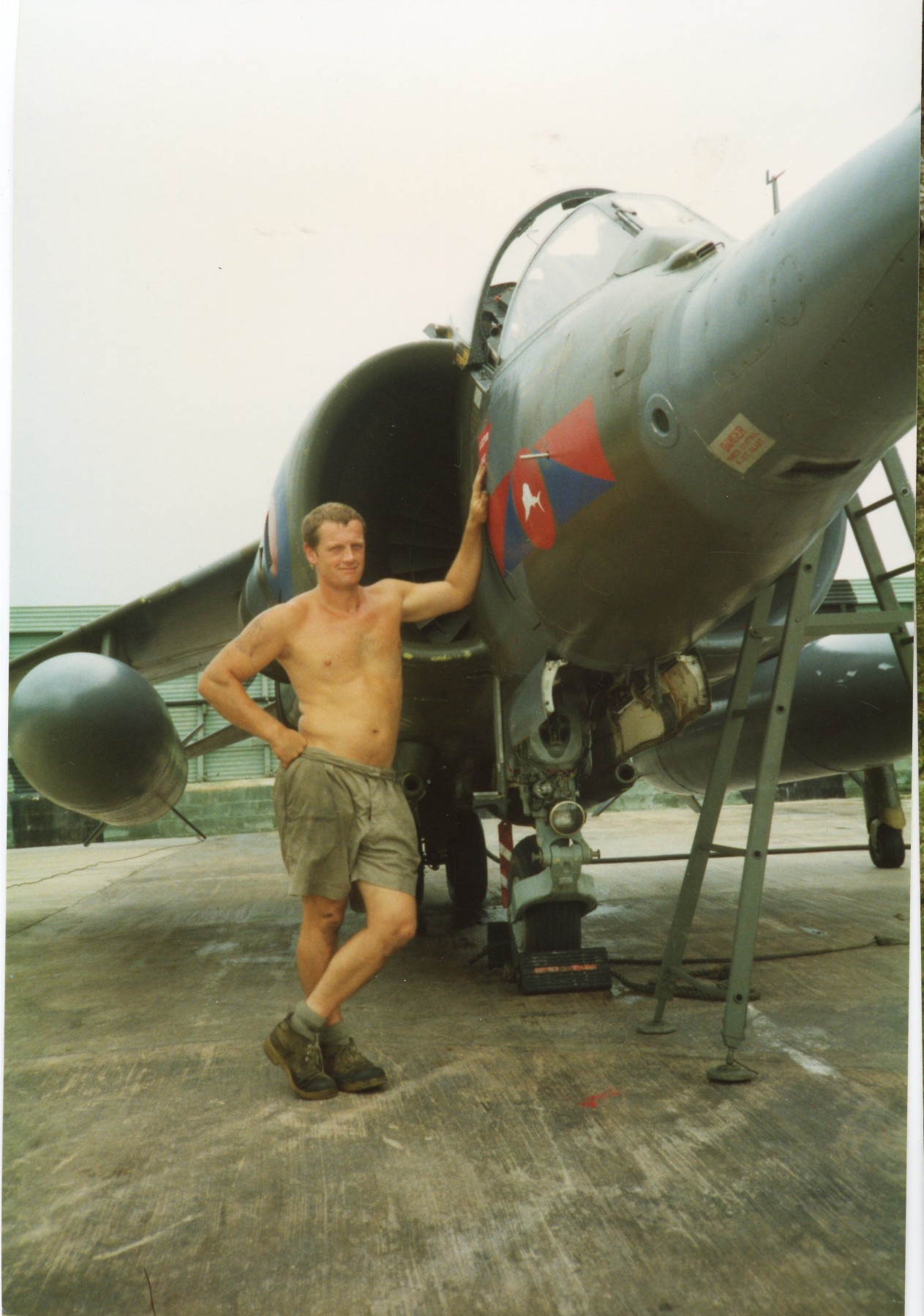
A close-up of the nose of a No. 1417 Flight Harrier showing the flight badge.

In 1975, with Guatemala in the grip of a bloody civil war, there was a real fear that Guatemalan forces might invade Belize and at the very least widen their Caribbean coastline. To bolster the resident British Army garrison, a detachment of six Hawker Siddeley Harrier GR.1As from No. 1 Squadron was sent to Belize international airport at Ladyville in November 1975. There they set about waving the flag and discouraging Guatemalan aggression. After several months the threat was perceived to have subsided and the Harriers returned to the UK in April 1976, only to return on a more permanent basis in June 1977, as part of a complete package with the Queen's Regiment of the British Army. A Vickers VC10 C1 and six Harriers from No. 1 Squadron flew direct with support from ten Handley Page Victor tankers.

=== Hardet Belize ===
Thus was born HarDet Belize; the six aircraft were operated from semi-permanent hides, named using the NATO phonetic alphabet. Alfa and Bravo hides were set up in the grounds of the Belikin brewery outside the gates to the garrison; Charlie and Delta hides were set up on the other side of the garrison access road. Echo hide either never existed or formed the basis of the Tie-down engine running pan at the eastern end of the runway. Foxy (contracted from Foxtrot) and Golf hides were set up around the airport fire station (which remained active), even using some of the fire station buildings. Hotel, India and Juliet hides were arranged around the access taxiway to Williamson Hangar and the edge of the airport apron.

=== No. 1417 (Tactical Ground Attack) Flight ===
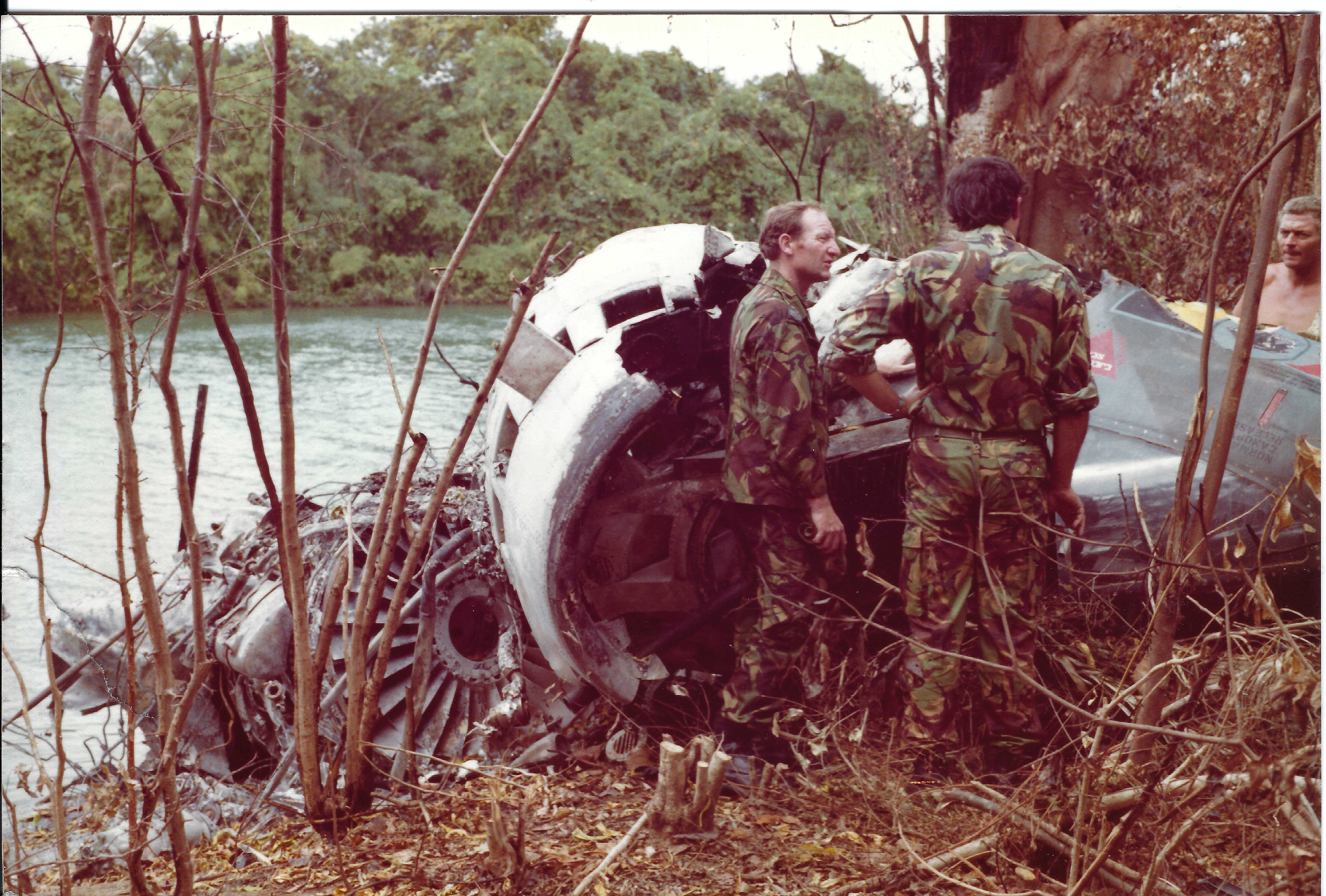
The wreckage of Harrier XW923 following its crash in May 1981.

After operating as a rotating roulement for two years, HarDet was put on an even more permanent footing with the formation of No. 1417 (Tactical Ground Attack) Flight (1417 (TGA) Flt) from 18 April 1980 until closure on 6 July 1993. Much flying was done, with plenty of flag-waving and sabre-rattling, the aircrew enjoying the post due to the lack of restrictions, and challenging missions. Eventually operations were confined to Charlie/Delta and Foxy/Golf hides which went through a slow metamorphosis to permanent semi-hardened hides with concrete surfaces and taxi-ways and block built buildings (including accommodation, kitchen and bars).

Several aircraft were lost due to various reasons, but one of the most spectacular incidents occurred when some months prior to the formation of 1417 Flight XZ132 encountered a large vulture which tore straight through the bird-strike armour in the intake, making a large hole in the starboard forward fuselage fuel tank. The contents of the fuel system promptly gushed out of this hole, causing a large cloud of fuel vapour as the aircraft approached to land. After stopping on the runway, the pilot could see the damage caused by the vulture and said he would have ejected if he had known the extent of the damage. XZ132 was sent back to the UK, repaired, and sent off to war in the Falkland Islands, albeit with a leaking front tank.

Other losses included:

Date	Aircraft serial no.	Crash location	Cause
1 December 1975	XV788		Engine problems due to bird strike
26 May 1981	XW923	Belize River	Loss of control during short take-off
14 July 1981	XV807	Georgeville	CFIT (Controlled Flight into Terrain)

Harriers of 1417 (TGA) Flt were also instrumental in securing diplomatic assurances for the future of Belize, after taking part in air shows at La Aurora International Airport, Guatemala City, for the 69th and 70th anniversaries of the Guatemalan Air Force, in 1990 and 1991, supported by a Westland Puma HC.1 from No. 1563 Flight.

== See also ==
- List of Royal Air Force aircraft squadrons
- List of RAF Regiment units
- List of Fleet Air Arm aircraft squadrons
- List of Army Air Corps aircraft units
- List of Royal Air Force aircraft independent flights
- List of RAF Squadron Codes
