= No. 70 Group RAF =

Former Royal Air Force operations group

No. 70 Group (Army Co-Operation Training) RAF
- Royal Air Force Ensign
- Active: 25 November 1940 to 17 July 1945
- Country: United Kingdom
- Branch: Royal Air Force
- Type: Royal Air Force group
- Role: Cooperation with the British Army
- Part of: RAF Army Cooperation Command (1940-1943); Air Defence of Great Britain (1943-1944); RAF Fighter Command (1944-1945)

Commanders
- Notable commanders: Air Vice Marshal John Beresford Cole-Hamilton CB, CBE

No. 70 Group (Army Co-Operation Training) RAF was a group of the Royal Air Force existing from November 1940 to July 1945. It was split from No. 22 Group RAF, Fighter Command, on 25 November 1940 to handle the increasing responsibility of training RAF units for army co-operation duties.

== History ==
The Airborne Forces Experimental Establishment was initially placed under the command of HQ No. 70 Group circa 1942.

In June 1944 it was made up of 285, 286, 287, 288, 289 and 290 Squadrons; 291 (Hutton Cranswick, Yorks); 567 (RAF Detling, Kent), 577 (Castle Bromwich Aerodrome), 587 (RAF Culmhead, Somerset), 595 (RAF Aberporth, Ceredigion), 598 (RAF Peterhead, Aberdeenshire), 631, 639, 650, 667, 679, and 691 Squadrons; two separate flights, No. 43 Operational Training Unit RAF, which had been formed in October 1942 at RAF Larkhill to train army co-operation air observers for deployment on the Auster; the Pilotless Aircraft Unit, Nos 3505-3508 Servicing Units; four airfield care & maintenance parties, including at RAF Ramsbury and Castle Bromwich; the School of Army Co-operation at RAF Old Sarum, and No. 13 Armament Practice Camp.

It was transferred to the Air Defence of Great Britain on 1 June 1943, which was later retitled back to Fighter Command in October 1944. The group was disbanded, soon after the end of the war in Europe, on 17 July 1945.

== Air Officer Commanding ==
Note: The ranks shown are the ranks held at the time of the appointment of Air Officer Commanding, No. 70 Group Royal Air Force.

No. 70 Group commanding officers
Rank	name	from
Air Commodore	John Cole-Hamilton	1 December 1940
Air Commodore	Cedric Ernest Victor Porter	21 November 1941
Group Captain	H R McL Reid (SASO/Acting AOC)	1 December 1940
Air Commodore	Herbert Bainbrigge Russell	12 July 1943
