= No. 679 Squadron RAF =

Defunct flying squadron of the Royal Air Force

- Active: 1 December 1943 – 26 June 1945
- Country: United Kingdom
- Branch: Royal Air Force
- Role: anti-aircraft co-operation
- Part of: No. 70 Group RAF, Air Defense of Great Britain (1943–1944); No. 70 Group RAF, Fighter Command (1944–1945)
- Base: RAF Ipswich, Suffolk

Insignia
- Squadron Badge heraldry: No badge known to have been authorised
- Squadron Codes: 3M (December 1943 – June 1945)

No. 679 Squadron RAF was an anti-aircraft co-operation squadron of the Royal Air Force during the Second World War.

== History ==
No. 679 Squadron was formed on 1 December 1943 at RAF Ipswich, Suffolk, from 1616 and 1627 (anti-aircraft co-operation) Flight for anti-aircraft training duties in East Anglia, and operated upon formation Westland Lysanders, Miles Martinets, Hawker Henleys and Hawker Hurricanes, receiving Fairey Barracudas and Hurricane Mk.IVs in March 1944 and Vultee Vengeances in April 1945. It was disbanded at RAF Ipswich on 26 June 1945.

== Aircraft operated ==
Aircraft operated by no. 679 Squadron RAF
From	To	Aircraft	Variant
December 1943	February 1944	Hawker Henley	Mk.III
December 1943	February 1944	Westland Lysander	Mk.II
December 1943	June 1945	Miles Martinet	Mk.I
December 1943	June 1945	Hawker Hurricane	Mk.IIc
March 1944	June 1945	Hawker Hurricane	Mk.IV
March 1944	June 1945	Fairey Barracuda	Mk.II
April 1945	June 1945	Vultee Vengeance	Mk.IV

== Squadron bases ==
Bases and airfields used by no. 679 Squadron RAF
From	To	Base
1 December 1943	26 June 1945	RAF Ipswich, Suffolk
