= No. 1300 Flight RAF =

- Active: 31 Jul 1943 – 30 May 1946; 1 Jun 1946 – 15 Mar 1947
- Country: United Kingdom
- Branch: Royal Air Force
- Role: Meteorological reconnaissance
- Part of: No. 231 Group RAF, Air Command South East Asia

No. 1300 (Meteorological) Flight was formed on 31 July 1943 at RAF Alipore, Calcutta, West Bengal, British India, by re-designating No. 1 Meteorological Flight RAF. The flight, strength of which had been reduced to three Hawker Hurricane Mk.IIs by this time, was disbanded on 30 May 1946 at RAF Kallang, Malaya, as No. 1300 (Meteorological THUM) Flight, THUM standing for Temperature and Humidity.

No. 1300 (Meteorological Reconnaissance) Flight was re-formed on 1 June 1946 at RAF Mingaladon, Burma, moving to RAF Butterworth, in Malaya, where it disbanded on 15 March 1947 to become No. 18 Squadron RAF.

== Aircraft operated ==
Aircraft operated by no. 1300 Flight RAF, data from
From	To	Aircraft	Version	Example
July 1943	?	Vultee Vengeance		
November 1943	?	Bristol Blenheim	Mk.IV	Z9811
August 1944	May 1946	Hawker Hurricane	Mk.IIc	LF201
August 1944	May 1946	Hawker Hurricane	Mk.IId	KW879
August 1944	1946	Hawker Hurricane	Mk.IV	KZ248
1945	1946	Supermarine Spitfire	Mk.XI	PL920
June 1945	March 1947	de Havilland Mosquito	FB.6	TE595; TE848
June 1945	March 1947	North American Harvard	T.2b	FS923 (Support aircraft)

== Flight bases ==
Bases and airfields used by no. 1300 Flight RAF, data from
From	To	Base
31 July 1943	11 April 1944	RAF Alipore, Calcutta, West Bengal, British India
11 April 1944	19 September 1944	RAF Baigachi, West Bengal, British India
19 September 1944	21 December 1945	RAF Alipore, West Bengal, British India
21 December 1945	30 May 1946	RAF Kallang, Malaya
1 June 1946	13 December 1946	RAF Mingaladon, Burma
13 December 1946	15 March 1947	RAF Butterworth, Malaya

== See also ==
- List of RAF Regiment units
- List of Fleet Air Arm aircraft squadrons
- List of Army Air Corps aircraft units
- List of Air Training Corps squadrons
- List of Battle of Britain squadrons
- University Air Squadron
- Air Experience Flight
- Volunteer Gliding Squadron
- List of Royal Air Force units & establishments
- List of Royal Air Force schools
- List of Royal Air Force aircraft independent flights
- List of RAF squadron codes
