= Alphabetically named Flights RAF/RFC =

The table below lists the independent aircraft flights of the Royal Flying Corps (RFC) and Royal Air Force (RAF) which were given alphabetical designations.

== Flights ==
flight letter	location(s)	period(s)	aircraft	notes
B, Palestine	RAF Aboukir; Weli Sheikh Nuran, Palestine	1917 - December 1917	B.E.2C; B.E.12	formed by re-designating an element of 23 Training Squadron
G	MAEE Helensburgh; RAF Bowmore	21 September 1940 – 13 March 1941	Short S.23; Short S.26	became 119 Squadron
H	RAF Ambala; RAF Drigh Road; RAF Ambala; RAF Lahore	25 August 1939 – 9 February 1940; January 1940 - October 1940	Blenheim I	became 'W' Flight on 9 Feb 1940, formed Jan 1940 from an element of Battle Flight RAF, last known at Lahore
I	Fauquembergues, France; Serny, France	9 July 1918 – 14 January 1919	F.E.2b; B.E.12	re-designated from Special Duty Flight, Royal Flying Corps
J	RAF Melton Mowbray; RAF Cairo West	28 September 1945 – 10 October 1945	Stirling V	disbanded at Cairo West to become No. 1589 (Heavy Freight) Flight RAF
K	Auxi-le-Château, France unknown Summit, Sudan; RAF Aqir, Palestine; RAF Melton Mowbray; RAF Santa Cruz	9 July 1918 - unknown 1 September 1940 – 1 April 1941; 16 September 1945 – 10 October 1945	R.E.8; Gladiator I Gladiator II; Stirling V	re-designated from 'B' Flight No. 112 Squadron RAF 1 Sep 1940 at Summit; became No. 1588 (Heavy Freight) Flight RAF at Santa Cruz on 10 Oct 1945
M	Longuenesse, Saint-Omer, France; Hangelar, Germany	6 October 1918 - August 1919	F.2b; DH.9; Fokker D.VII; S.E.5a	
N	Vert Galand, France unknown	18 September 1919 - unknown	F.2b	records begin on 18 September 1919
O	Premont Farm, France unknown	23 October 1918 - unknown	F.2b	date and location of disbandment unknown
P	Serny, France unknown Ismailia, Egypt; Jeddah, Arabia	29 August 1918 - unknown 9 June 1919 – 25 May 1919	R.E.8; F.2b	date and location of disbandment unknown; formed at Ismailia from a detached Flight of No. 113 Squadron RAF
Q	RAF Ambala; RAF Rednal	25 August 1939 – 15 December 1940 October 1943 - January 1944	Blenheim I Gladiator I Vickers Wellington	formed at Ambala by re-designating an element of No. 60 Squadron RAF; disbanded to become No. 4 Coastal Defence Flight, Indian Air Force Volunteer Reserve disbanded
V	RAF Ambala; RAF Juhu unknown	25 August 1939 - unknown	Blenheim I Hawker Audax	formed at Ambala by re-designating an element of No. 60 Squadron RAF, disbanded finally at unknown location and date
W	RAF Drigh Road	9 February 1940 – 15 December 1940	Blenheim I	re-designated from 'H' Flight
X	Aqaba, Egypt; RAF Haifa; RAF Habbaniya; RAF Abadan	24 November 1917 – 19 October 1918; May 1940 - June 1940; 6 June 1941 – 30 June 1941; 16 July 1942 – 30 October 1942	B.E.2C; B.E.12; Bristol F2b; Nieuport 17; Gladiator I Gladiator II	initially formed from Special Duty Flight RFC
Y	RAF Ambala; RAF St. Thomas Mount unknown	1917	Blenheim I Audax	
Z	Istrana, Italy; Villaverla, Italy; Taganrog, Russia; Rostov, Russia; RAF Ambala; RAF Dum-Dum	March 1918 - 3 July 1918; 30 November 1919 - January 1920; 28 August 1939; December 1940	Bristol F.2b; R.E.8; Blenheim I	formed, at Istrana, by re-designating an element of No. 34 Squadron RAF; re-formed at RAF Ambala, by re-designating an element of 60 Squadron

== See also ==
- List of Royal Air Force aircraft squadrons
- List of Battle of Britain squadrons
- List of conversion units of the Royal Air Force
- List of Royal Air Force units & establishments
- List of Royal Air Force schools
- List of Royal Air Force aircraft independent flights
- University Air Squadron
- Air Experience Flight
- Volunteer Gliding Squadron
- List of Air Training Corps squadrons
- List of RAF Regiment units
- List of Fleet Air Arm aircraft squadrons
- List of Army Air Corps aircraft units
- List of RAF squadron codes
- United Kingdom military aircraft registration number
- United Kingdom aircraft test serials
- British military aircraft designation systems
- Royal Air Force roundels
