= No. 1321 Flight RAF =

No. 1321 Flight
- Vickers Valiant B.1 WP201, of No. 1321 Flight RAF.
- Active: 1 Sep 1944 – 1 Nov 1944; 3 Aug 1954 – 15 Mar 1956; 1 Oct 1957 – 31 Mar 1958
- Country: United Kingdom
- Branch: Royal Air Force
- Role: Fighter affiliation Nuclear Weapons trials Electronic countermeasures (ECM)

Aircraft flown
- Bomber: Vickers Valiant B.1; Avro Lincoln B.2; English Electric Canberra B.2
- Fighter: Hawker Hurricane Mk.IIc

No. 1321 Bomber (Defence) Training Flight RAF was first formed at RAF Bottesford on 1 September 1944 as a fighter affiliation unit to train bomber crews from No. 5 Group Bomber Command how to defend their aircraft. The Flight was disbanded two months later on 1 November 1944 and absorbed by the units they trained before, 1668 Heavy Conversion Unit and 1669 Heavy Conversion Unit.

No. 1321 (Valiant/Blue Danube Trials) Flight RAF was reformed at RAF Wittering on 3 August 1954 as a Vickers Valiant unit to integrate the Blue Danube nuclear weapon into Royal Air Force service. It was commanded by Squadron Leader D. Roberts, formerly commanding officer of No. 617 Squadron. Squadron Leader Roberts had earlier reported to Wisley Airfield, the Vickers-Armstrongs flight test airfield in Surrey, expecting to take a three-week conversion course to the Valiant. Instead he remained there for 15 months until he reported to Wittering to command 1321 Flight. 1321 Flight's first aircraft was Valiant WP201. Roberts and his crew flew it from Wisley to Wittering on 15 June 1955 to begin an intensive program of integration tests. The tests had two main separate components:

1. Ballistic performance of the bomb casing at various altitudes and speeds
2. Testing of the equipment from the Atomic Weapons Research Establishment under operational conditions

A variety of BTV (Ballistic Test Vehicle) drops were carried out at various heights and speeds at the experimental Bombing Range on Orfordness. The ballistic performance of the weapon was found to be so good that there was a risk of it not leaving the slipstream of the bomber and consequently flying along with the aircraft. Retractable spoilers were fitted to the underside of the fuselage, just forward of the bomb bay in order to induce turbulence within the bomb bay enabling the bomb to fall away. All the live nuclear weapons dropped at Maralinga (Australia) and Christmas Island (Pacific Ocean) were assembled, pre-drop tested and loaded on to specially prepared Valiant bombers of 49 Squadron and 138 Squadron by the small team of technical specialists from 1321 Flight. The life of 1321 (Valiant/Blue Danube Trials) Flight came to an end on 15 March 1956 when it became 'C' Flight of No. 138 Squadron, the first regular Valiant unit.

The flight was reformed, once again, by the merger of the Avro Lincoln element of 199 Squadron, called Arrow Squadron and Antler Squadron, to become No. 1321 (ECM) Flight RAF at RAF Hemswell on 1 October 1957, disbanding on 31 March 1958 and absorbed by the Bomber Command Bombing School.

== Aircraft operated ==
Aircraft operated by no. 1321 Flight RAF, data from
From	To	Aircraft	Version	Example
1 September 1944	1 November 1944	Hawker Hurricane	Mk.IIc	LF180; PZ735
3 August 1954	15 March 1956	Vickers Valiant	B.1	WP201
1 October 1957	31 March 1958	Avro Lincoln; English Electric Canberra	B.2; B.2	SX951; WJ616

== Flight bases ==
Bases and airfields used by no. 1321 Flight RAF, data from
From	To	Base
1 September 1944	1 November 1944	RAF Bottesford, Leicestershire
3 August 1954	15 March 1956	RAF Wittering, Cambridgeshire
1 October 1957	31 March 1958	RAF Hemswell, Lincolnshire

== See also ==
- List of Royal Air Force independent flights
