= No. 542 Squadron RAF =

Defunct flying squadron of the Royal Air Force

- Active: 19 October 1942 – 27 August 1945; 15 May 1954 – 1 Oct 1955; 1 Nov 1955 – 1 Oct 1958
- Country: United Kingdom
- Branch: Royal Air Force
- Motto(s): Above all

Insignia
- Squadron Badge: A Globe surrounded by stars

No. 542 Squadron RAF was a Royal Air Force Squadron formed as a photographic reconnaissance squadron in World War II that reformed in the post war period.

== History ==
=== Formation in World War II ===
The squadron formed at RAF Benson on 19 October 1942 from A and E Flights of the Photographic Reconnaissance Unit. For a period, it used nearby RAF Mount Farm as its operational base. The squadron was equipped with the Spitfires with to fly photo reconnaissance missions over Europe. Originally equipped with the Spitfire IV, it received the Mark VII in November, the Mk IX in February 1943, the Mk XI in April, the Mk XIX in May 1944, and the Mk X in July. After the end of the war, No. 542 Squadron was disbanded on 27 August 1945.

=== Postwar ===
The squadron reformed at RAF Wyton on 17 May 1954 with photo reconnaissance Canberras, the first unit fully equipped with the Canberra, but was disbanded again on 1 October 1955. During this first Canberra period the squadron detached four PR 7s to RAF Changi in May 1955 to conduct photo reconnaissance during the Malayan Emergency; the detachment remained there for three months before it rotated out. It was reformed at Wyton the following month from No. 1323 Flight, moving to Westonzoyland on 15 December to prepare for its detachment to Australia. At Laverton it carried out survey and sampling flights during the Operation Mosaic nuclear weapons tests in Australia between 1956 and 1957. On 31 March 1957 it returned to RAF Hemswell in the UK before being renumbered to No. 21 Squadron on 1 October 1958.

== Aircraft operated ==
Aircraft operated by no. 542 Squadron RAF
| From | To | Aircraft | Variant |
|---|---|---|---|
| Oct 1942 | Jul 1943 | Supermarine Spitfire | IV |
| Mar 1943 | Aug 1945 | Supermarine Spitfire | XI |
| May 1944 | Aug 1945 | Supermarine Spitfire | X |
| Jun 1944 | Aug 1945 | Supermarine Spitfire | XIX |
| May 1954 | Oct 1955 | English Electric Canberra | PR 7 |
| Nov 1955 | Oct 1958 | English Electric Canberra | B.2 |
| Nov 1955 | Oct 1958 | English Electric Canberra | B.6 |
