= 713 Naval Air Squadron =

Inactive flying squadron of the Royal Navy's Fleet Air Arm

713 Naval Air Squadron ~~713 (Catapult) Flight FAA~~
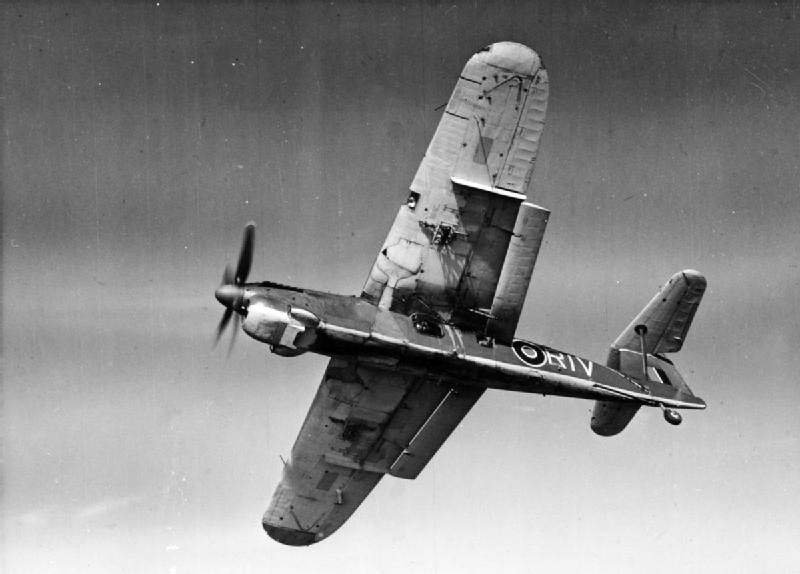
- Fairey Barracuda Mk II; an example of the type used by 713 NAS
- Active: Royal Air Force; 1936–1939; Royal Navy: 1939–1940; 1944–1945
- Disbanded: 20 December 1945
- Country: United Kingdom
- Branch: Royal Navy
- Type: Fleet Air Arm Second Line Squadron
- Role: Catapult Flight; Torpedo Bomber Reconnaissance Training Squadron
- Size: Squadron
- Part of: Fleet Air Arm
- Home stations: RAF Kalafrana; RNAS Ronaldsway

Insignia
- Identification Markings: 078-079 (Osprey & Seafox); H9A+ (Osprey & Seafox May 1939); AR2A to AR6A+ (Barracuda); R2A+ to R7A+ (Barracuda later)

Aircraft flown
- Bomber: Fairey Barracuda
- Reconnaissance: Hawker Osprey; Fairey Seafox

713 Naval Air Squadron (713 NAS), also referred to as 713 Squadron, is an inactive Fleet Air Arm (FAA) naval air squadron of the United Kingdom’s Royal Navy (RN). It last operated Fairey Barracuda torpedo and dive bomber aircraft, from 1944 to when the squadron was disbanded in late 1945.

It was first formed from 445 (Fleet Spotter Recomaissance) Flight in 1936 and operated with Fairey Seafox floatplanes from RAF Kalafrana at the onset of the Second World War and subsequently integrated into 700 Naval Air Squadron, in January 1940.

The squadron was re-established at HMS Urley, RNAS Ronaldsway, Isle of Man, in December 1944, functioning as a Torpedo Bomber Reconnaissance Training Squadron.

== History ==
=== Catapult flight / squadron (1936-1940) ===
713 Naval Air Squadron can trace its roots back to 1935 when 445 (Fleet Spotter Recomaissance) Flight, FAA, of the Royal Air Force was formed on 30 August 1935. 713 (Catapult) Flight, FAA, formed on 15 July 1936 at Royal Air Force Kalafrana, a Seaplane Station and flying boat base in Malta, by redesignating 445 (Fleet Spotter Recomaissance) Flight, FAA. It operated Hawker Osprey III, a two-seat fleet spotter and reconnaissance biplane and Fairey Seafox, a reconnaissance seaplane.

As part of the 3rd Cruiser Squadron the unit was responsible for overseeing the aircraft stationed on the name ship of her class, HMS Arethusa, sister ship HMS Galatea and subsequently sister ship HMS Penelope. By the onset of 1939, the unit had achieved the status of a full-fledged squadron. However, this period of relative standing was short-lived. On 21 January 1940, the unit was integrated into 700 Naval Air Squadron.

=== Torpedo Bomber Reconnaissance Training squadron (1944-1945) ===
On 12 August 1944, at RNAS Ronaldsway, also known as HMS Urley, located on the Isle of Man, 713 Naval Air Station Squadron reformed as a new unit designated as a Torpedo Bomber Reconnaissance Training Squadron. To fulfill its training objectives, the squadron utilised Fairey Barracuda, a torpedo and dive bomber aircraft.

The unit undertook a comprehensive anti-submarine training program and in parallel, 'B' Flight played a pivotal role as the Squadron Commander's Attack School, providing a specialised and intensive brief course on dive-bombing techniques. Furthermore, 713 Naval Air Squadron joined forces with 710 Naval Air Squadron to deliver Part III of the Torpedo Bomber Reconnaissance (TBR) Course.

713 Naval Air Squadron continued its training operations until its eventual disbandment in December 1945.

== Aircraft flown ==
713 Naval Air Squadron operated a number of different aircraft types:

- Hawker Osprey FP fighter and reconnaissance biplane (July 1936 - April 1938)
- Fairey Seafox reconnaissance seaplane (November 1937 - January 1940)
- Fairey Barracuda Mk II torpedo and dive bomber (August 1944 - December 1945)
- Fairey Barracuda Mk III torpedo and dive bomber (November 1944 - December 1945)

== Naval air stations ==
713 Naval Air Squadron operated from a naval air station of the Royal Navy and a Royal Air Force station, in the United Kingdom and overseas:

1936 - 1940

- Royal Air Force Kalafrana, Malta, (15 July 1936 - 21 January 1940)
- disbanded - (21 January 1940)

1944 - 1945

- Royal Naval Air Station Ronaldsway (HMS Urley), Isle of Man, (12 August 1944 - 20 December 1945)
- disbanded - (20 December 1945)

== Ships' Flights ==
List of Royal Navy ships where responsibility for the aircraft belonged to 713 Flight, between 1936 and 1940:

- HMS Arethusa 1936-40
- HMS Galatea 1936-40
- HMS Penelope 1937-40

== Commanding officers ==
List of commanding officers of 713 Naval Air Squadron with date of appointment:

1936 - 1940

- Lieutenant Commander J.P.G. Bryant, RN, (Flight Lieutenant, RAF), from 15 July 1936
- Lieutenant M. Bruce, RN, (Flight Lieutenant, RAF), from 1 April 1937
- Lieutenant M. Johnstone, RN, (Flight Lieutenant, RAF), from 15 November 1937
- Lieutenant J. Hamilton, RN, from 26 June 1939
- disbanded - 21 January 1940

1944 - 1945

- Lieutenant Commander(A) A.G. McWilliam, RNVR, from 12 August 1944
- disbanded - 20 December 1945

Note: Abbreviation (A) signifies Air Branch of the RN or RNVR.
