= No. 587 Squadron RAF =

- Active: 1 December 1943 – 15 June 1946
- Country: United Kingdom
- Branch: Royal Air Force
- Role: anti-aircraft co-operation

Insignia
- Squadron Codes: M4 (Dec 1943 – Jun 1946)

No. 587 Squadron RAF was an anti-aircraft co-operation squadron of the Royal Air Force from 1943 to 1946.

== History ==
The squadron was formed at RAF Weston Zoyland, England on 1 December 1943, from 1600 Flight, 1601 Flight and 1625 Flight for anti-aircraft co-operation duties over Wales and the south east of England. It operated a variety of aircraft. By June 1944 it was part of No. 70 Group RAF, Air Defence of Great Britain.

Due to the ongoing training requirement the squadron was not disbanded at the end of the war and it moved to RAF Tangmere on 1 June 1946 to cover the south coast, but was disbanded shortly afterwards on 15 June 1946.

== Aircraft operated ==
Aircraft operated by no. 587 Squadron, data from
From	To	Aircraft	Version
December 1943	February 1944	Airspeed Oxford	
December 1943	May 1944	Hawker Henley	Mk.III
December 1943	June 1945	Hawker Hurricane	Mk.IV
December 1943	August 1945	Miles Martinet	
March 1944	June 1945	Hawker Hurricane	Mk.IIc
October 1944	June 1946	Vultee Vengeance	Mk.IV
April 1945	May 1945	North American Mustang	Mk.I
July 1945	June 1946	Supermarine Spitfire	Mk.XVI

== Squadron bases ==
Bases and airfields used by no. 587 Squadron RAF, data from
From	To	Base	Remark
1 December 1943	10 April 1944	RAF Weston Zoyland, Somerset	
10 April 1944	1 October 1944	RAF Culmhead, Somerset	Dets. at RAF Pengam Moors, Glamorgan, Wales; RAF Colerne, Wiltshire and RAF Carew Cheriton, Pembrokeshire, Wales
1 October 1944	1 June 1946	RAF Weston Zoyland, Somerset	Dets. at RAF Middle Wallop, Hampshire and RAF Ibsley, Hampshire
1 June 1946	15 June 1946	RAF Tangmere, West Sussex	
