= No. 520 Squadron RAF =

Former flying squadron of the Royal Air Force

- Active: 20 September 1943 – 25 April 1946
- Country: United Kingdom
- Branch: Royal Air Force
- Role: meteorological
- Part of: HQ RAF Gibraltar, Coastal Command
- Motto(s): Tomorrow's Weather Today

Insignia
- Squadron Badge heraldry: A dove holding in the beak an olive branch
- Squadron Codes: 2M (September 1943 – April 1946)

No. 520 Squadron RAF was a meteorological squadron of the Royal Air Force during the Second World War.

== History ==
The squadron was formed at RAF Gibraltar on 20 September 1943 from 1403 Flight. Equipped with Lockheed Hudsons, it was tasked with collecting meteorological data from both the Mediterranean and Atlantic. In February 1944 it was re-equipped with Handley Page Halifaxes and these were supplemented by Supermarine Spitfires, although the Spitfires were replaced with Hawker Hurricanes a few months later. In September 1944 the squadron absorbed 1500 (BAT) Flight and its Miles Martinets, which were used for target towing. The squadron also operated the Hudson again and also the Vickers Warwick. The squadron continued to serve for a while after the war was over, and was even given an air-sea rescue task, using the Warwicks, but was disbanded at Gibraltar on 25 April 1946.

== Aircraft operated ==
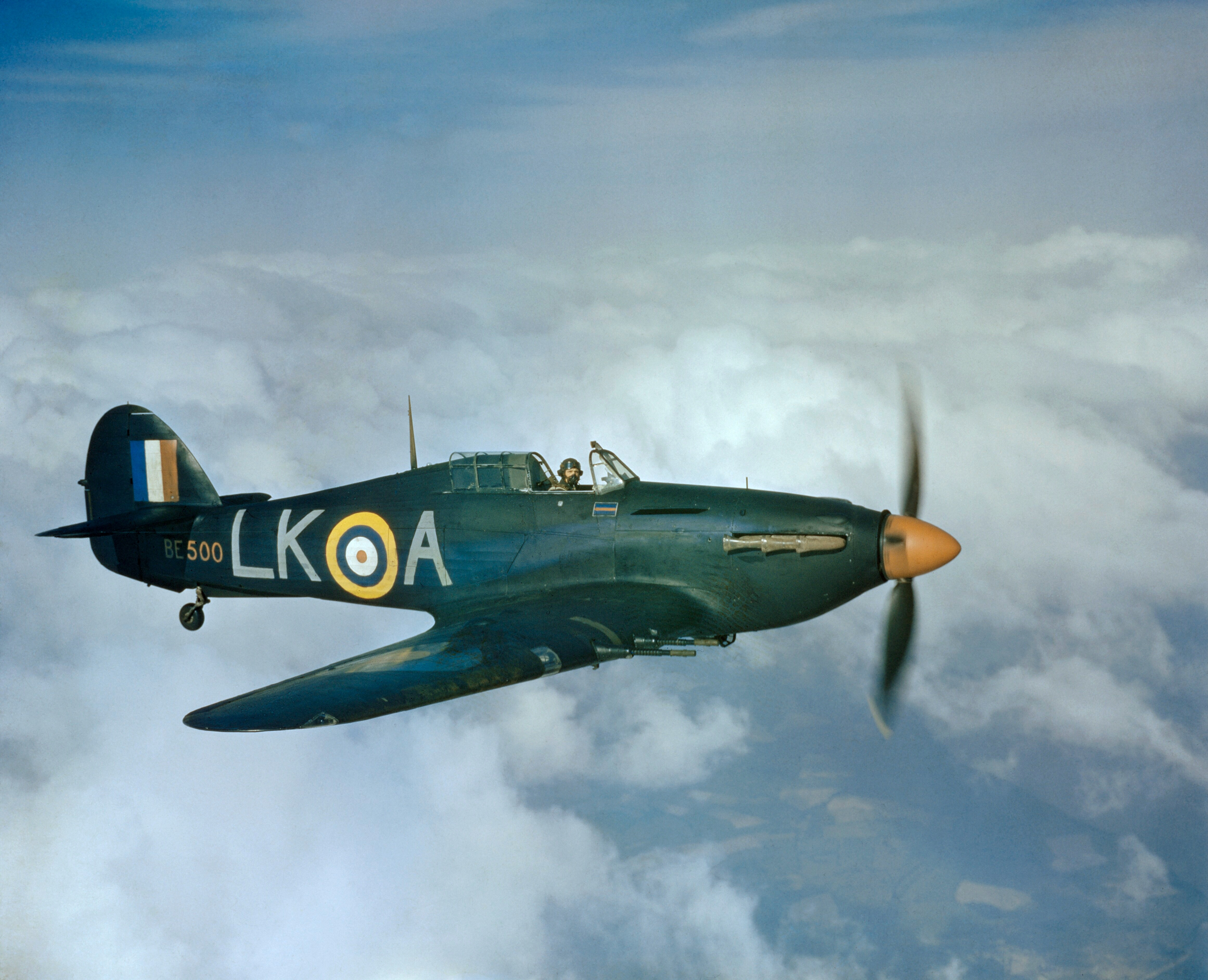
Hawker Hurricane IIC

Aircraft operated by no. 520 Squadron RAF, data from
From	To	Aircraft	Variant
September 1943	March 1944	Lockheed Hudson	Mk.III
September 1943	June 1944	Gloster Gladiator	Mk.II
February 1944	June 1945	Handley Page Halifax	Mk.V
February 1944	June 1944	Supermarine Spitfire	Mk.Vb
June 1944	April 1946	Hawker Hurricane	Mk.IIc
September 1944	December 1945	Miles Martinet	Mk.I
January 1945	October 1945	Lockheed Hudson	Mk.III
April 1945	April 1946	Handley Page Halifax	Mk.III
August 1945	April 1946	Vickers Warwick	Mk.I
October 1945	January 1946	Lockheed Hudson	Mk.VI

== Squadron bases ==
Bases and airfields used by no. 520 Squadron RAF, data from
From	To	Base	Remark
20 September 1943	25 April 1946	RAF Gibraltar	already in use with 1403 Flight since 6 March 1943

== See also ==
- List of Royal Air Force aircraft squadrons
