= Arabian Peninsular Reconnaissance Flight RAF =

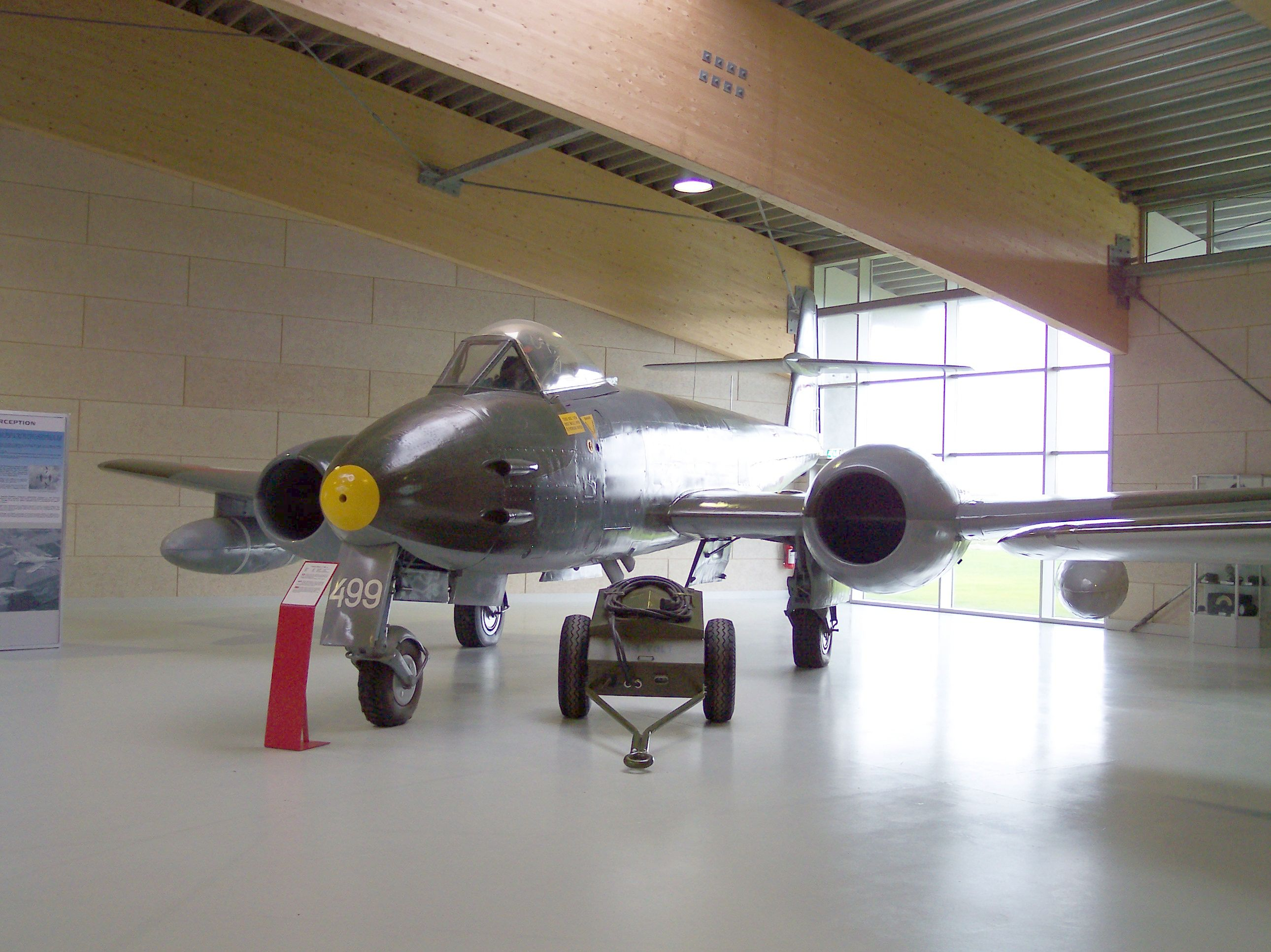
- Active: 1 August 1959 – 1 October 1959; October 1959 - April 1960
- Role: Tactical Reconnaissance
- Garrison/HQ: RAF Khormaksar
- Equipment: Gloster Meteor FR.9

== Aden Protectorate Reconnaissance Flight ==
From 1956 Gloster Meteor FR Mk.9 aircraft from No. 208 Squadron RAF were deployed to Aden for operations against rebel tribesmen and Yemeni insurgents. This Squadron was withdrawn at the time of the Suez Crisis. 'C' Flight 208 Squadron returned in 1958 and was re-designated as the Aden Protectorate Reconnaissance Flight, formed on 1 August 1959, flying Meteor FR.9's. This flight was disbanded and renamed Arabian Peninsular Reconnaissance Flight on 1 October 1959.

== Arabian Peninsular Reconnaissance Flight ==
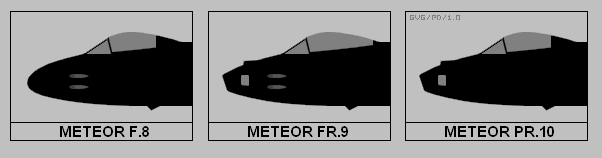
The Arabian Peninsular Reconnaissance Flight was formed at RAF Khormaksar when the Aden Protectorate Reconnaissance Flight was dis-banded and renamed on 1 October 1959. The flight continued to fly the Meteor FR.9's on tactical reconnaissance missions until it was disbanded in April 1960, handing the tactical recce mission over to No. 8 Squadron RAF, flying Hawker Hunter FR.10's.

== See also ==
- No. 1417 Flight RAF

The APRF was absorbed into 8 Squadron in August 1960 as B Flight. The Meteor FR.9s continued to serve the Squadron until gradual replacement by Hunter FR.10s during the spring and summer of 1961. The last Meteor operational sortie of an 8 Squadron Meteor FR.9 was flown in late July 1961.
