= No. 1439 Flight RAF =

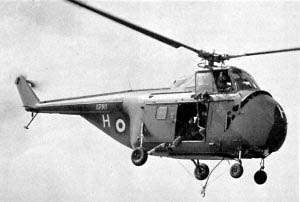
- A Westland Whirlwind helicopter, like the ones used in the flight
- Active: ? - June 1942; 8 May 1957 – 20 November 1957
- Role: Strategic Reconnaissance; Transport
- Garrison/HQ: Western Desert (Egypt); RAF Hemswell; RAF Christmas Island
- Equipment: Bristol Blenheim; Vickers Varsity; Avro Anson> Westland Whirlwind

There is unconfirmed evidence that a No. 1439 (Strategic Reconnaissance) Flight RAF was formed during the Western Desert Campaign ca. June 1942, flying Bristol Blenheim aircraft.

The flight was reformed as No. 1439 (Communication Support) Flight at RAF Hemswell on 8 May 1957 to support the Nuclear Weapons Task Force during the Operation Grapple nuclear weapon tests on or near Christmas Island (Kiritimati) in a remote Pacific region. Flying continued for six months until the Flight was dis-banded on 20 November 1957.

== Aircraft operated ==
Aircraft operated by no. 1439 Flight RAF, data from
| From | To | Aircraft | Version | Example |
|---|---|---|---|---|
| June 1942 | ? | Bristol Blenheim | | |
| 1 May 1957 | 20 November 1957 | Vickers Varsity | T.1 | WL676 |
| 1 May 1957 | 20 November 1957 | Avro Anson | Mk.XIX | TX196 |
| 1 May 1957 | 20 November 1957 | Westland Whirlwind | HAR.2 | XD164 |

== Flight bases ==
Bases and airfields used by no. 1439 Flight RAF, data from
| From | To | Base |
|---|---|---|
| June 1942 | ? | Western desert |
| 1 May 1957 | 22 August 1957 | RAF Hemswell, Lincolnshire |
| 22 August 1957 | ? | LRWRE Woomera, Australia |
| ? | 20 November 1957 | RAF Hemswell, Lincolnshire |
