= No. 1301 Flight RAF =

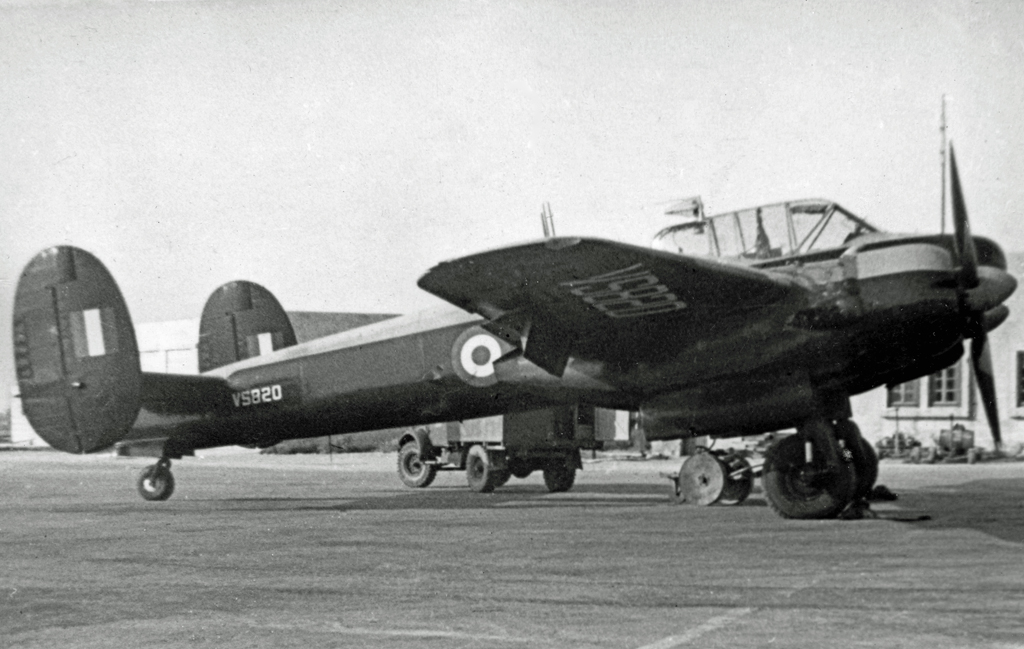
- Active: 31 July 1943 – 1 June 1946; 14 June 1949 – 30 November 1951
- Role: Meteorological reconnaissance
- Garrison/HQ: RAF Delhi; RAF Nagpur; RAF Negombo
- Equipment: Bristol Blenheim IV; Hawker Hurricane IIC/IID Bristol Brigand MET.3; North American Harvard IIB

No. 1301 (Meteorological) Flight was formed at RAF Delhi, in India, on 31 July 1943, by re-designating 2 Meteorological Flight. The flight was disbanded on 1 June 1946 at RAF Nagpur, in India. this Flight was re-formed on 14 June 1949 at RAF Negombo in Ceylon, from elements of No. 45 Squadron RAF, where it disbanded on 30 November 1951.

== Allocated Aircraft ==
(This is a partial list)

=== July 1943 - June 1946 ===
Blenheim IV Z7350

Hurricane IID HW720

=== June 1949 - November 1951 ===
Bristol Brigand MET.3 VS817 VS820 (see 1949 image)

Harvard IIB FT186
