= No. 1302 Flight RAF =

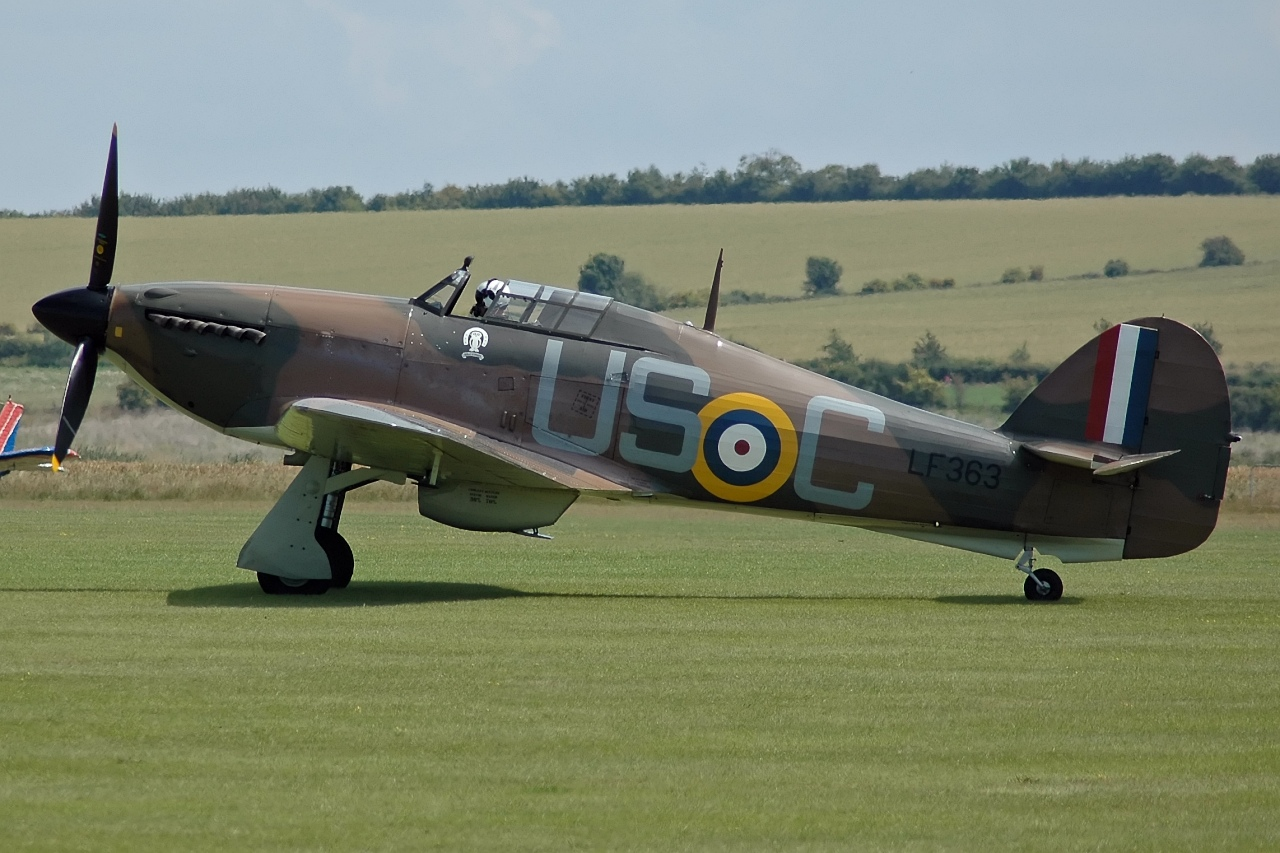
- A Hawker Hurricane from the Battle of Britain flight
- Active: 31 July 1943 – 1 June 1946
- Country: United Kingdom
- Branch: Royal Air Force
- Role: Meteorological reconnaissance
- Part of: No. 225 Group RAF, Air Command South East Asia

Insignia
- Squadron Badge heraldry: No known badge
- Squadron Codes: No known identification code for the flight is known to have been carried

No. 1302 (Meteorological) Flight was formed at RAF Yelahanka, Karnataka, British India, on 31 July 1943 by re-designating No. 3 Meteorological Flight RAF. The flight was disbanded on 1 June 1946 at RAF Bangalore, Karnataka, British India.

== Aircraft operated ==
Aircraft operated by no. 1302 Flight RAF, data from
From	To	Aircraft	Version	Example
February 1944	1 June 1946	Bristol Blenheim	Mk.IV	Z7611
March 1944	1 June 1946	Vickers Wellington	Mk.Ic	HX773
?	1 June 1946	Boulton Paul Defiant		
August 1944	1 June 1946	Hawker Hurricane	Mk.IIc	LD402
August 1944	1 June 1946	Hawker Hurricane	Mk.IId	KX243

== Flight airfields ==
Camps and airfields used by No. 1302 Flight RAF, data from
From	To	Base
31 July 1943	14 March 1944	RAF Yelahanka, Karnataka, British India
14 March 1944	?	RAF St. Thomas Mount, Madras, British India
?	1 June 1946	RAF Bangalore, Karnataka, British India
