= No. 1303 Flight RAF =

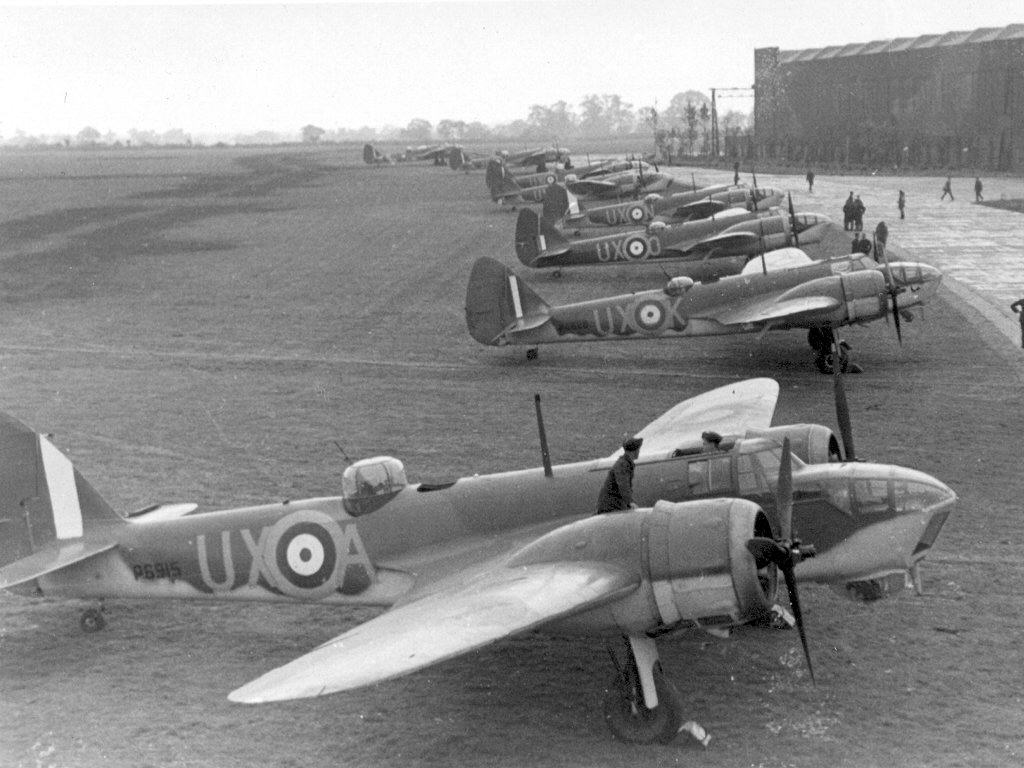
- Bristol Blenheim Mk.IVs, but as the code 'UX' gives away, from No. 82 Squadron RAF
- Active: 31 July 1943 – 30 April 1946
- Country: United Kingdom
- Branch: Royal Air Force
- Role: Meteorological reconnaissance
- Part of: No. 222 Group RAF, Air Command South East Asia

Insignia
- Squadron Badge heraldry: No known badge
- Squadron Codes: No known identification code for the flight is known to have been carried

No. 1303 (Meteorological) Flight was formed at RAF Ratmalana, Ceylon, on 31 July 1943 by re-designating No. 4 Meteorological Flight RAF. The flight was disbanded on 30 April 1946 at RAF Negombo, Ceylon.

== Aircraft operated ==
Aircraft operated by no. 1303 Flight RAF, data from
From	To	Aircraft	Version	Example
January 1944	30 April 1946	Bristol Blenheim	Mk.IV	Z9706
1 July 1944	30 April 1946	Hawker Hurricane	Mk.IIc	LD242 S
1 July 1944	30 April 1946	Hawker Hurricane	Mk.IId	HW796

== Flight bases ==
Bases and airfields used by no. 1303 Flight RAF, data from
From	To	Base
31 July 1943	19 April 1944	RAF Ratmalana, Ceylon
19 April 1944	1 July 1944	RAF Sigiriya, Ceylon
1 July 1944	1 December 1945	RAF Ratmalana, Ceylon
1 December 1945	30 April 1946	RAF Negombo, Ceylon
