= No. 567 Squadron RAF =

- Active: 1 December 1943 – 15 June 1946
- Country: United Kingdom
- Branch: Royal Air Force
- Role: anti-aircraft co-operation
- Part of: No. 70 Group RAF, Fighter Command

Insignia
- Squadron Codes: I4 (December 1943 – June 1946)

No. 567 Squadron was an anti-aircraft co-operation squadron of the Royal Air Force, formed during World War II and active between December 1943 and June 1946 in the defence of south-east England.

== History ==
No. 567 Squadron was formed on 1 December 1943 at RAF Detling, Kent from No. 1624 (Anti-Aircraft Co-Operation) Flight. The anti-aircraft co-operation duties included target-towing with Miles Martinets, gun-laying and searchlight practice with Airspeed Oxfords and simulated attacks on exercising troops with Hawker Hurricanes. After the end of World War II, the Martinets gave way for the Vultee Vengeances and the Hurricanes were replaced with Supermarine Spitfires. The Oxfords stayed with the squadron till it was disbanded, 15 June 1946 at RAF West Malling.

== Aircraft operated ==
Aircraft operated by No. 567 Squadron RAF, data from
From	To	Aircraft	Version
December 1943	June 1945	Hawker Hurricane	Mk.IV
December 1943	July 1945	Miles Martinet	Mk.I
December 1943	July 1945	Fairey Barracuda	Mk.II
December 1943	June 1946	Airspeed Oxford	Mks.I, II
January 1945	June 1946	Vultee Vengeance	MK.IV
February 1945	December 1945	Avro Anson	Mk.I
July 1945	June 1946	Supermarine Spitfire	Mk.Vb
July 1945	June 1946	Supermarine Spitfire	Mk.XVI

== Squadron bases ==
Bases and airfields used by No. 567 Squadron RAF, data from
From	To	Base	Remark
1 December 1943	14 November 1944	RAF Detling, Kent	Det. at RAF Eastchurch, Kent
14 November 1944	13 June 1945	RAF Hornchurch, Essex	Dets. at RAF Hawkinge, Kent; RAF Lympne, Kent and RAF Eastchurch, Kent
13 June 1945	21 August 1945	RAF Hawkinge, Kent	
21 August 1945	26 April 1946	RAF Manston, Kent	Det. at RAF Eastchurch, Kent
26 April 1946	15 June 1946	RAF West Malling, Kent	
