= Royal Air Force Antarctic Flight =

Defunct flying unit of the RAF

The Royal Air Force Antarctic Flight was an independent flight of the Royal Air Force organised to support the Norwegian–British–Swedish Antarctic Expedition in 1949-50. It was the first RAF unit to operate in Antarctica.

The Flight was led by Squadron-Leader George Brian Walford, and had five personnel in total, selected from over 250 volunteers - two officer pilots and three non-commissioned officer mechanics. It operated two Auster Mark 6 aircraft, painted orange and modified for cold-weather conditions, with convertible ski/wheel and float undercarriages.

The Flight was shipped to Antarctica from Cape Town aboard the Norsel, a Norwegian ship, in November 1949, and operated from the newly established Maudheim station in early 1950, supporting the mapping of the area around the station in preparation for scientific expeditions into the continent. The aircraft were withdrawn in February 1950 and the flight was disbanded on its return to South Africa. In the following seasons, air support was provided to the expedition by Norwegian aircraft.

The two modified Auster aircraft were acquired by the Australian government for the Antarctic Flight RAAF in 1952, and after rebuilding work were deployed to Antarctica in the 1953/54 summer season, where both operated from Mawson station. One was lost on the return voyage, but the other served in Antarctica over a number of years until it was sold after the end of the 1958/59 season.

Another two Austers were operated by the RAF and RNZAF (as "Auster Antarcticas") as part of the Commonwealth Trans-Antarctic Expedition in 1955-58.
