= No. 291 Squadron RAF =

Former flying squadron of the Royal Air Force

- Active: 1 December 1943 – 26 June 1945
- Country: United Kingdom
- Branch: Royal Air Force

Insignia
- Squadron Code: MM (Allocated April – September 1939)

No. 291 Squadron RAF was a Royal Air Force squadron formed as an anti-aircraft cooperation unit in World War II.

== History ==
No. 291 Squadron was formed at RAF Hutton Cranswick in Yorkshire on 20 November 1941. It was equipped initially with Miles Martinets and then Hawker Hurricanes and Lockheed Hudsons. Targets were towed by aircraft to provide practice for the anti-aircraft defences in Eastern England. The squadron was also equipped with the Vultee Vengeance before it was disbanded on 26 June 1945.

== Aircraft operated ==
Aircraft operated by No. 291 Squadron
From	To	Aircraft	Variant
Dec 1943	Mar 1944	Hawker Henley	III
Dec 1943	Mar 1944	Miles Martinet	
Mar 1944	Nov 1944	Hawker Hurricane	IIC
Apr 1944	Jun 1945	Hawker Hurricane	IV
Nov 1944	Jun 1945	Vultee Vengeance	IV
