= No. 598 Squadron RAF =

- Active: 1 December 1943 – 30 April 1945
- Country: United Kingdom
- Branch: Royal Air Force
- Role: Anti-aircraft Co-operation Unit

Insignia
- Squadron badge heraldry: No badge authorised
- Squadron codes: No squadron codes known to have been carried

No. 598 Squadron RAF was an Anti-aircraft Co-operation squadron of the Royal Air Force during the Second World War.

== History ==
The squadron was formed on 1 December 1943 at RAF Peterhead, Scotland from No. 1479 Flight RAF and No. 1632 Flight RAF. It was tasked as an Anti-aircraft Co-operation Unit to cover the north east of Scotland and though officially based at Peterhead, it had detachments all over Scotland. The squadron continued in its role to March 1945, when it moved south to RAF Bircham Newton and re-equipped with the Bristol Beaufighter. It disbanded at Bircham Newton on 30 April 1945.

== Aircraft operated ==
Aircraft operated by no. 598 Squadron RAF, data from
From	To	Aircraft	Version
December 1943	January 1944	Westland Lysander	Mk.IIa
December 1943	April 1945	Airspeed Oxford	Mks.I, II
December 1943	April 1945	Miles Martinet	Mk.I
February 1944	April 1945	Hawker Hurricane	Mk.IV
June 1944	April 1945	Hawker Hurricane	Mk.IIc
April 1945	April 1945	Bristol Beaufighter	Mk.I

== Squadron bases ==
Bases and airfields used by no. 598 Squadron RAF, data from
From	To	Base	Remarks
1 December 1943	12 March 1945	RAF Peterhead, Aberdeenshire, Scotland	Dets. at RAF Longman, Inverness; RAF Skeabrae, Orkney Islands; RAF Sumburgh, Shetland Islands; RAF Montrose, Angus and RAF Turnhouse, Edinburgh
12 March 1945	30 April 1945	RAF Bircham Newton, Norfolk	Dets. at RAF Lympne, Kent; RAF Peterhead, Aberdeenshire and RAF Hutton Cranswick, East Riding of Yorkshire

== See also ==
- List of Royal Air Force aircraft squadrons
