= Muharraq Airfield =

Military base located in Bahrain

Muharraq Airfield Manama IAP ~~RAF Muharraq~~ ~~RAF Bahrain~~
- IATA: none; ICAO: OBBI

Summary
- Airport type: Military
- Operator: United States Navy
- Location: Muharraq
- Built: 1943
- In use: 1943-present
- Elevation AMSL: 2 m (6.6 ft)
- Coordinates: 26°16′15″N 050°38′01″E

Map
- Location in Bahrain

Runways
Direction	Length		Surface
Direction	ft	m	Surface
12R/30L	0	0	Asphalt
12L/30R	0	0	Asphalt

Muharraq Airfield is a military base located in Bahrain adjacent to Bahrain International Airport. It is run by the United States Navy (USN) and usually ships supplies in and out of the airport with many of them from other countries as well. The USN, the United States Marine Corps (USMC), the Ministry of Interior, and others run the security at the airfield. Often referred to as the nearby city of Manama, Muharraq Airfield was the last stop for most US troops being sent to fight in the War in Afghanistan (2001-2021), including with the multinational International Security Assistance Force.

It was previously established by the Royal Air Force as RAF Bahrain (later changed to RAF Muharraq) in April 1943 and remained in use until 1971 when Bahrain declared independence.

== History ==
The Royal Air Force's history with Bahrain began in 1924, with flights originating from Shaibah Air Base in Iraq. Bahrain's strategic importance to the British led to the signing of a civil air agreement with the King of Bahrain in 1934.

The Royal Air Force established a base there in the area as RAF Bahrain on 22 May 1943, as part of RAF Iraq Command. It was renamed RAF Muharraq in 1963. From 15 September 1967 to 8 August 1969 Air Forces Gulf Communication Squadron RAF flew from the base. The base was also used by Search and Rescue Flight RAF Muharraq, based there from the mid-sixties to 1971.

The following squadrons were here at some point:

- A detachment from No. 212 Squadron RAF from 1942 with the Consolidated Catalina IB
- A detachment from No. 413 Squadron RCAF from 1942 with the Catalina I & IV
- No. 8 Squadron RAF between 30 June and 14 October 1961 with Hawker Hunter FGA.9 & FR.10
- No. 30 Squadron RAF between 1 September 1964 and 7 September 1967 with the Blackburn Beverly C.1
- Detachment from No. 73 Squadron RAF from January 1954 with the Vampire FB.9
- No. 84 Squadron RAF between 30 December 1970 and 1 October 1971 with the Hawker Siddeley Andover C.1
- No. 105 Squadron RAF between 6 August 1967 and 1 February 1968 with Armstrong Whitworth AW.660 Argosy C.1
- No. 152 (Hyderabad) Squadron RAF between 1 October 1958 and 15 November 1967 with the Percival Pembroke C.1, Scottish Aviation Twin Pioneer CC.1 & CC.2
- No. 208 Squadron RAF between 30 June and 15 November 1961 with the Hunter FGA.9
- Detachment from No. 294 Squadron RAF between 1945 and 1946

Units

- No. 35 Air Despatch & Reception Unit (1943-44)
- No. 1417 Communications Flight RAF (1953-58)
- Gulf Communications Flight (1967-70)
- HQ RAF Persian Gulf (1959-67) became HQ Air Forces Gulf (1967-71)
- No. 158 Repair & Salvage Unit (1945)
- Search & Rescue Flight, Muharraq (1969-71)
- No. 43 Staging Post (1943-46)
- Bahrain Station Flight became Muharraq Station Flight

The base was formally closed on 15 December 1971.

The base was used by a detachment of Vickers VC10 tankers from No. 101 Squadron RAF during the Gulf War training with Royal Air Force Panavia Tornado GR1's.

From May 1997 a detachment of VC10s returned supporting Operation Jural and later Operation Bolton over Iraq.

== Current use ==
It became part of No. 83 Expeditionary Air Group in the Middle East. Commanded by a Squadron Leader (RAF) until 2015, the current ranking Officer is a Warrant Officer First Class (Supply Chain) RN.

The base is also used by Mine countermeasures helicopters patrolling the Persian Gulf such as HM-15's Sikorsky MH-53E Sea Dragon's.

== See also ==
- List of airports in Bahrain
