= Operation Herrick aerial order of battle =

This is the Operation Herrick aerial order of battle, which lists any aerial or airfield protection units of the British armed forces that have taken part in the duration of Operation Herrick between 2002 and 2014.

== Kandahar Force Protection Wing ==
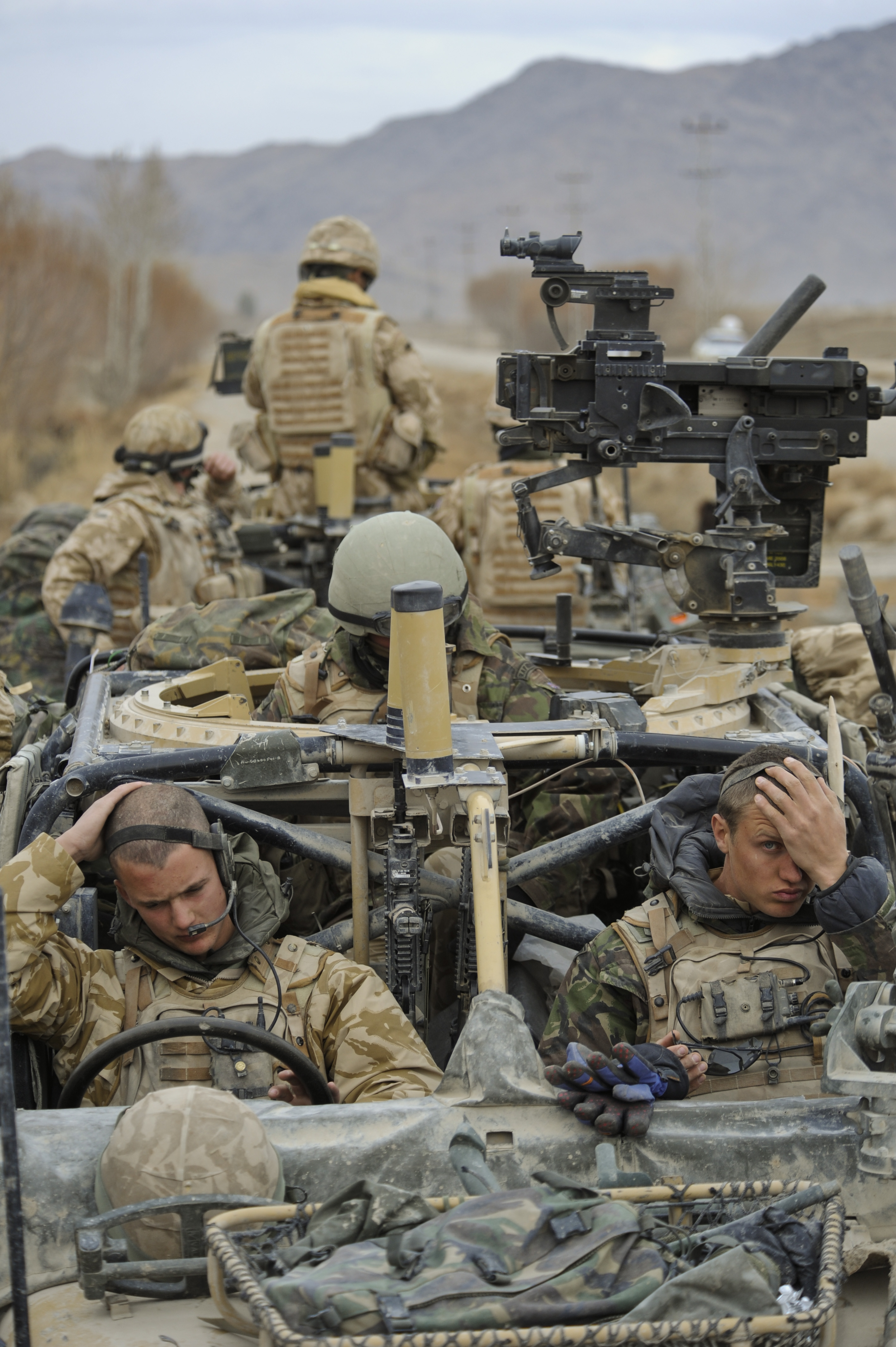
British aircraftmen from B Flight, 27 Squadron, RAF Regiment take a break whilst on a combat mission near Kandahar Airfield, 2 January 2010

The Royal Air Force Regiment used a variety of vehicles including Pinzgauer Vector's, Vixen Land Rover's and WMIK Land Rover's to externally protect Kandahar Airfield and the Wing was controlled by a Wing Commander who was responsible for the safety of initially 12,000 personnel:

- June 2006 – October 2006
  - No. 34 Squadron RAF Regiment
- October 2006 – April 2007
  - No. II Squadron RAF Regiment
- April 2007 – October 2007 - No. 5 Force Protection Wing
  - No. 51 Squadron RAF Regiment
    - C Flight
- October 2007 – March 2008
  - No. 15 Squadron RAF Regiment
- March 2008 – October 2008
  - No. 3 Squadron RAF Regiment
    - Support Weapons Flight
- October 2008 – March 2009
  - No. 1 Squadron RAF Regiment - as featured on ITV's Warzone series
- March 2009 – October 2009
  - Queen's Colour Squadron
- During January 2010
  - No. 27 Squadron RAF Regiment
- During February 2010
  - No. II Squadron RAF Regiment
    - D Flight
- During February 2011
  - No 15 Squadron RAF Regiment

== Bastion Force Protection Wing ==
- OP H 4 (May – November 2006)
- OP H 5 (November 2006 – April 2007)
- OP H 6 (April 2007 – October 2007)
- OP H 7 (October 2007 – April 2008)
- OP H 8 (April 2008 – October 2008)
  - 1st Battalion, The Royal Irish Regiment (27th (Inniskilling), 83rd, 87th and Ulster Defence Regiment)
    - Imjin Company (2 R IRISH Territorial unit)
- OP H 9 (October 2008 – April 2009)
- OP H 10 (April 2009 – October 2009)
  - 34 Squadron RAF Regiment
- OP H 11 (October 2009 – April 2010)
- OP H 12 (April 2010 – October 2010)
  - 1 Squadron RAF Regiment
    - B Squadron
- OP H 13 (October 2010 – April 2011)
- OP H 14 (April 2011 – October 2011)
- OP H 15 (October 2011 – April 2012)
- OP H 16 (April 2012 – October 2012)
  - No. 5 Force Protection Wing
    - Wing Headquarters
    - 51 Squadron RAF Regiment
    - Elements of 2622 (Highland) Squadron RAuxAF Regiment
  - No. 2 Tactical Police Squadron
  - Soldiers from the Tongan Defence Service
  - Elements of 16th Regiment Royal Artillery
- OP H 17 (October 2012 – April 2013)
- OP H 18 (April 2013 – October 2013)
- OP H 19 (October 2013 – June 2014)
- OP H 20 (June 2014 – December 2014)
  - No. 7 Force Protection Wing

=== RAF Regiment ===
- During January 2010 No. 3 Squadron RAF Regiment
- During October 2010 No. 1 Squadron RAF Regiment
- During February 2011 No. 2 Force Protection Wing RAF
- During April 2011 No. 34 Squadron RAF Regiment
- April 2011 – November 2011 No. 6 Force Protection Wing RAF
- April 2011 – November 2011 No. 58 Squadron RAF Regiment
- November 2011 - April 2012 No. 3 Force Protection Wing RAF
- April 2012 - November 2012 No. 5 Force Protection Wing RAF - first unit to use the new Foxhound patrol vehicle
- December 2012 – unknown No. 7 Force Protection Wing RAF
- September 2013 – April 2014 No. 58 Squadron RAF Regiment

== Aerial assets ==
- Task Force Jaguar and the Joint Aviation Group (JAG).

The initial helicopter complement was:3-5_3

- 8 × Apache AH.1
- 4 × Lynx
- 8 × Chinook

The peak amount of helicopters was during January 2011 with:3-5_3

- 11 × Apache AH.1
- 4 × Lynx AH.9A
- 9 × Chinook
- 4 × Sea King HC.4+
- 5 × Merlin HC.3

=== Mixed operators ===
The Westland Lynx AH.7/9/9A was used in Afghanistan by both the Army Air Corps and the Fleet Air Arm. With the Army Air Corps (AAC) it was operated by both 1 and 9 Regiments and with the Fleet Air Arm it was only used by 847 Naval Air Squadron (NAS).

The first unit to use the Lynx AH.9A was 672 Squadron/9 Regiment AAC during Mid 2010.

The Lynx was also used by the Joint Special Forces Aviation Wing of which 657 Squadron was part of. The squadron was deployed to Kandahar at least once during 2014 where one of its Lynx's was lost along with the entire crew.

Year	January - May	May - September	September - January
2006		9 Regt AAC	
2007		3 Regt AAC	
2008			847 NAS
2009	847 NAS		
2010		672 Sqn/9 Regt AAC	659/9 Regt AAC
2011	847 NAS	661/1	652/1
2012	9 Regt AAC		1 Regt AAC
2013	847 NAS	661/1 Regt AAC	
2014			

In August 2004, the Ministry of Defence announced that 6 Royal Air Force British Aerospace Harrier GR.7 jets from No. 3 Squadron would deploy to Afghanistan, marking the first time RAF ground-attack jets have been deployed to the country with them fully arriving by September.

- Harrier detachment (Joint Force Harrier):
  - No. 3 Squadron RAF from September until December 2004.
  - No. 1 Squadron RAF from December 2004 until April 2005.
  - No. 4 Squadron RAF from April until July 2005.
  - 3 Sqn from July until October 2005.
  - 4 Sqn from October until December 2005.
  - 1 Sqn from December 2005 until May 2006.
  - 4 Sqn from May until September 2006.
  - 800 Naval Air Squadron from September 2006 until January 2007
- During 2007 the GR.9A variant was introduced
  - 1 Sqn from January 2007 until June.
  - 4 Sqn from June until October 2007.
  - Naval Strike Wing from October 2007 until February 2008
  - 4 Sqn from February 2008 until April.
  - 1 Sqn from April until August 2008.
  - Naval Strike Wing from August 2008 until December
  - 4 Sqn from December 2008 until April 2009.
  - 1 Sqn from April until June 2009 (Last British Harrier Squadron in Afghanistan).

The Harrier detachment was replaced by the all-RAF Tornado detachment in June 2009.

- 1710 Naval Air Squadron - helicopter and UAV repair

=== Army Air Corps ===
The Army Air Corps operated the AgustaWestland AH.1 Apache and the Westland Lynx AH.7/9/9A in Afghanistan.

The AgustaWestland AH.1 Apache was operated by 3, 4 and pre September 2007 9 Regiment

Year	January - May	May - September	September - January
2006	N/A	656 Sqn/9 Regt	664/9 Regt
2007	656/9 Regt	664/9 Regt	662/3 Regt
2008	663/3 Regt	664/4 Regt	654/4 Regt
2009	656/4 Regt	662/3 Regt	663/3 Regt
2010	653/3 Regt	664/4 Regt	654/4 Regt
2011	662/3 Regt	663/3 Regt	653/3 Regt
2012	654/4 Regt	664/4 Regt	662/3 Regt
2013	663/3 Regt	653/3 Regt	654/4 Regt
2014	664/4 Regt	664/4 Regt	662/3 Regt

=== Royal Air Force ===
The air component of British forces assigned to Operation Herrick was based at both Kandahar Airfield under 904 Expeditionary Air Wing (904 EAW) and Camp Bastion under 903 EAW.

Fixed wing

- Tornado detachment (Jun 09 - 11 Dec 14) - Eight Tornado GR4 aircraft were stationed at Kandahar tasked with providing close air support to British, Coalition and ISAF ground forces. These replaced the Joint Force Harrier aircraft - eight Harrier GR9
  - No. 12 Squadron RAF from June 2009.
  - No. 31 Squadron RAF during 2009.
  - No. IX (Bomber) Squadron RAF
  - No. XIII Squadron RAF during 2010.
  - No. II (AC) Squadron RAF from June 2010.
  - No. 13 Squadron RAF
  - No. 14 Squadron RAF
  - No. 12 Squadron RAF until April 2011.
  - No. 617 Squadron RAF until July 2011.
  - No. 31 Squadron RAF from July 2011.
  - No. 12 Squadron RAF
  - No. 617 Squadron RAF until March 2012.
  - No. II (AC) Squadron RAF from March to November 2012.
  - No. IX (Bomber) Squadron RAF
  - No. 31 Squadron RAF from March to July 2013.
  - No. 12 Squadron RAF from July to Unknown.
  - No. 617 Squadron RAF from unknown to January 2014.
  - No. II (AC) Squadron RAF between February and June 2014.
  - No. IX (Bomber) Squadron RAF between June 2014 and September 2014.
  - No. 31 Squadron RAF between September 2014 and 11 November 2014.
- Hercules detachment (6 Apr 06 - 14 Nov 14) - Five C-130 Hercules transport aircraft from RAF Brize Norton (formerly RAF Lyneham) were also stationed at Kandahar and Camp Bastion to provide troop and supply movement capability in Helmand and wider Afghanistan. Three aircraft were C-130K models and two were C-130J, with crews taken from all four RAF Hercules squadrons:
  - No. 24 Squadron RAF
  - No. 30 Squadron RAF
  - No. 47 Squadron RAF
  - No. 70 Squadron RAF
- Sentinel detachment - Raytheon Sentinel R.1 were first deployed from February 2009
  - No. 5 Squadron RAF
- Sentry detachment - Boeing Sentry AEW.1 were deployed to Afghanistan
  - No. 8 Squadron RAF

Rotary wing

- No. 1310 Flight RAF (Apr 06 - 12 Dec 14) - The support helicopter force consisted of 8 Chinook HC.2/4 helicopters with crews rotated from the three RAF squadrons, based at KAF with most forward deployed at Bastion:
  - No. 7 Squadron RAF
  - No. 18 Squadron RAF
    - A Flight (Feb 2011 - April 2011)
  - No. 27 Squadron RAF
  - 5 Flight (Aug 2011 - Oct 2011)
  - 1 Flight (Oct 2011 - Dec 2011)
  - 2 Flight (Dec 2011 - Feb 2012)
  - 3 Flight (Feb 2012 - Apr 2012)
  - 4 Flight (Apr 2012 - July 2012)
- No. 1419 Flight RAF - The support helicopter force consisted of 5 AgustaWestland Merlin HC.3 helicopters with crews rotated from the two RAF squadrons between October 2009 and May 2013.
  - No. 28 Squadron RAF
    - A Flight
    - B Flight
  - No. 78 Squadron RAF
    - A Flight
    - B Flight

Other units

- UAV Detachment - 3 x MQ-9 Reaper were introduced to Kandahar during October 2007.
  - No. 39 Squadron RAF from October 2007.
- 1 Air Mobility Wing (1 AMW) is a specialist unit of the RAF trained in the loading and unloading of transport aircraft. This unit operated in conjunction with the Hercules detachment.
- Tactical Medical Wing - The TMW provided RAF medical services to all forces, and is particularly adept in the field of aeromedical evacuation.
- Mobile Meteorological Unit - Providing weather forecasting and reporting services to aircrew and commanders.
- 47 Air Despatch Squadron, Royal Logistic Corps - 47 AD Squadron is a specialist unit trained in the receipt, loading and preparing of stores by both helicopter and fixed wing aircraft.

=== Fleet Air Arm ===
Elements of the Royal Navy's Fleet Air Arm squadrons regularly rotated with each tour.

- Westland Sea King's (Joint Helicopter Force (Afghanistan)):
  - 845 Naval Air Squadron - Sea King HC4+ - Camp Bastion.
    - April 8 - April 12.
  - 846 Naval Air Squadron - Sea King HC4+.
    - October 7 - October 11

The ASaC7 version of the Westland Sea King has been in use in Afghanistan since May 2009.

- 854 Naval Air Squadron - Sea King ASaC7 - Camp Bastion.
  - November 10 – March 12.
  - June 14 – 18 July 14.
- 857 Naval Air Squadron - Sea King ASaC7 - Camp Bastion.
  - May 9 - December 10/July 14
  - From March 12 until unknown at least until July 14.
