= No. 672 Squadron AAC =

No. 672 Squadron AAC No. 672 Squadron RAF
- Active: 16 November 1944 – 1 July 1946 (RAF); 1 January 1990 – December 1993; September 2001 – 31 July 2016
- Country: United Kingdom
- Branch: (United Kingdom) Army Air Corps
- Part of: 9 Regiment Army Air Corps
- Last base: Dishforth Airfield

Aircraft flown
- Helicopter: AgustaWestland Lynx AH.9A

No. 672 Squadron AAC is a former squadron of the British Army's Army Air Corps (AAC). It was formerly No. 672 Squadron RAF, a Royal Air Force squadron that was operational during the Second World War within British India.

== Service ==
In 1944, it was decided to form six Army Air Corps squadrons in British India in order to support planned airborne assault operations in South East Asia. The squadrons would be equipped with Waco Hadrian gliders and light aircraft, and would be crewed by a mixture of surplus pilots from the Royal Air Force and pilots from the Glider Pilot Regiment. 672 Squadron formed at Bikram, Bihar as part of No. 344 Wing RAF, (No. 229 Group RAF), and equipped with Hadrians and de Havilland Tiger Moth trainers. The squadron flew training missions for the rest of the Second World War, but did not see combat, and was disbanded on 1 July 1946 as last unit of 344 Wing.

No badge was authorised for the squadron.

672 was formed as an AAC squadron on 1 January 1990 operating the Westland Lynx AH.7 from Alanbrooke Barracks, Topcliffe within 9 Regiment AAC. It moved to Dishforth Airfield during March 1992 and disbanded during December 1993.

The squadron was reformed during September 2001 to develop tactics for attack helicopter use within the British Army. It began operating the Lynx AH.9 from June 2004, deployed to Iraq as part of Operation Telic from January to June 2007.

The unit deployed to Afghanistan as part of Operation Herrick where it was the first Army Air Corps to operate the new AgustaWestland Lynx AH.9A on operations.

It was initially planned to reactivate the squadron for the AgustaWestland Wildcat AH.1 but this did not materalise.

== Aircraft operated ==
Aircraft operated by no. 672 Squadron RAF, data from
From	To	Aircraft	Version
November 1944	August 1945	Waco Hadrian	
November 1944	August 1945	de Havilland Tiger Moth	Mk.II

== Squadron bases ==
Bases and airfields used by no. 673 Squadron RAF, data from
From	To	Base
16 November 1944	26 February 1945	Bikram, Bihar, British India
26 February 1945	30 April 1945	Belgaum, Karnataka, British India
30 April 1945	August 1945	Bikram, Bihar, British India
August 1945	19 November 1945	Kargi Road, Chhattisgarh, British India
19 November 1945	1 April 1946	Fatehjang, Punjab, British India
1 April 1946	1 July 1946	Chaklala, Punjab, British India

== See also ==
- List of Army Air Corps aircraft units
