= No. 903 Expeditionary Air Wing =

Royal Air Force wing of expeditionary elements, currently based at RAF Akrotiri

903 Expeditionary Air Wing RAF
- Heraldic badge of 903 EAW
- Active: 1 December 1944 – 31 October 1945; 2003 – 2014; 2015 – present
- Country: United Kingdom
- Allegiance: Monarch of the United Kingdom
- Branch: Royal Air Force
- Type: Expeditionary Air Wing
- Role: RAF deployable elements
- Size: ≈ 500 personnel
- Part of: 83 Expeditionary Air Group RAF
- Based at: RAF Akrotiri, Cyprus
- Nickname: 903 EAW
- Website: 903 EAW

Aircraft flown
- Attack: Typhoon FGR4
- Transport: A400M Atlas C1
- Tanker: Voyager KC3

No. 903 Expeditionary Air Wing Royal Air Force (903 EAW) is an Expeditionary Air Wing (EAW) of the Royal Air Force (RAF). It is currently based at RAF Akrotiri within the Sovereign Base Area on the Mediterranean island of Cyprus, and is tasked with conducting operations against Islamic State of Iraq and the Levant (ISIL) in Iraq and Syria.

903 EAW was activated during 2003 in its current form as part of a modernisation directive to make the Royal Air Force more deployable on an 'expeditionary' basis. It was previously stationed at Camp Bastion in Afghanistan, controlling RAF operations at the airbase there between Summer 2009 and November 2014. It used to report to No. 83 Expeditionary Air Group RAF (83 EAG).

== History ==
=== Second World War ===
903 Wing RAF was active from 1 December 1944; 81 years ago to 31 October 1945 as a tactical wing, part of No. 224 Group RAF, Third Tactical Air Force. It was formed at Chittagong Airfield from Royal Air Force HQ Patenga. In December 1944, it was temporarily at Comilla with No. 67 Squadron RAF (Supermarine Spitfire);

In May 1945, 903 Wing provided close support to ground forces as they recaptured Rangoon before being redeployed to attack concentrations of Japanese forces remaining in Burma. On 12 September, No. 903 Wing was stationed at Kallang, the old civil airport of Singapore City when Lord Louis Mountbatten accepted the formal surrender of all Japanese forces in south-east Asia. It included No. 31 Squadron RAF (Douglas Dakota). On 31 October 1945; 80 years ago, No 903 Wing was disbanded, becoming Station Headquarters Kallang.

=== Operation Telic ===
903 EAW badge (2018)
- https://twitter.com/BattleBackGolf/status/989938521342464001/photo/1

903 Wing was re-commissioned into service during 2003, and sent to Contingency Operating Base Basra as part of Operation Telic.

The wing stayed at Basra until May 2009.

=== Operation Herrick ===
During mid-2009, the 903 Wing was moved to Camp Bastion in Afghanistan as part of Operation Herrick, subsequently forming as an Expeditionary Air Wing (EAW). It then consisted of:

- Westland Sea Kings operated by 845, 846, 854 and 857 Naval Air Squadrons.
- RAF Force Protection Wing
- Thales Watchkeeper WK450s operated by 32nd Regiment Royal Artillery and 47th Regiment Royal Artillery.

It also supported the following:

- Joint Helicopter Force (Afghanistan) that consisted of:
  - AgustaWestland Apaches operated by 3 and 4 Regiments Army Air Corps.
  - Chinooks operated by No. 1310 Flight RAF.
  - Merlin MK3 operated by 28(AC) and 78 Squadrons RAF.
  - Elements of Tactical Supply Wing.
- Visiting Air Mobility aircraft including:
  - Airbus Voyager KC3 operated by No. 10 Squadron RAF and 101 Squadron RAF.
  - Lockhead TriStar aircraft operated by 216 Squadron RAF.
  - Boeing C-17A Globemaster IIIs operated by No. 99 Squadron RAF.
  - Hercules C-130J C4/C5 operated by 24, 30, 47 and 70 Squadrons RAF.

Camp Bastion was transferred to the Afghan National Security Forces (ANSF) when the United Kingdom withdrew from Afghanistan, and 903 EAW was stood down in November 2014; 11 years ago.

== Operation Shader ==
In December 2015; 10 years ago, the 903 EAW reformed at RAF Akrotiri in Cyprus to replace No. 140 EAW as part of Operation Shader. It consists of:

- Elements of the RAF Typhoon Force – 9 x Typhoon FGR4 multi-role combat aircraft (six active, three reserve)
- Elements of the RAF Air Mobility Force:
  - Airbus A400M Atlas C1 transport aircraft (as of 2023, replacing previously operated Hercules C5 tactical transport aircraft which were withdrawn from RAF service in 2023)
  - 2 x Voyager KC3 multi-role tanker transport aircraft
- Elements of the Royal Air Force ISTAR Force

Royal Air Force aircraft have been using RAF Akrotiri as their home airbase whilst carrying out these operations. In February 2019, the Tornado GR4 force (previously involving up to ten strike aircraft on rotation) returned to RAF Marham for the type's retirement from service. The Tornado role in theatre is being undertaken by the Typhoon FGR4 detachment. Sentry AEW1 airborne early warning and control (AEW&C) aircraft from No. 8 Squadron were previously employed on operations. However, the aircraft was withdrawn from RAF service in 2021. The previously employed Sentinel R1 ISTAR aircraft from No. V(AC) Squadron was similarly retired in March 2021. In October 2025, two Protector UAVs were reported deployed at RAF Akrotiri. It was the first known international deployment of the type by the RAF.

== Anti-Houthi operations (2024) ==
In early 2024, in response to attacks launched against international maritime shipping by Houthi rebels in Yemen, Royal Air Force Typhoon FGR4 combat aircraft, supported by Voyager KC2/KC3 tanker aircraft, carried out strikes against Houthi forces. Four Cyprus-based Typhoons, carrying Paveway IV laser-guided bombs, and two Voyager aircraft were employed in the strikes.

== Deployments as of March 2026 ==
In the context of the outbreak of the 2026 Iran war, RAF Akrotiri came under attack by Iranian UAVs. Elements deployed to protect the base included:

- Detachment of Eurofighter Typhoon FGR4 from RAF Coningsby and RAF Lossiemouth
- Detachment of RAF/Royal Navy F-35B multirole fighters
- Royal Navy Fleet Air Arm detachments, including Merlin AEW and Wildcat attack helicopters deployed to strengthen anti-UAV defences
- RAF Regiment and Royal Marine detachments with Martlet multirole missiles; possible deployment of British Army detachment with Sky Sabre surface-to-air missiles
- Elements of the RAF ISTAR Force were also reported at the base including:
  - At least two Protector UAVs and likely Shadow R1 ISR aircraft

== Commanders ==
rank	name	from	to	notes, refs
Group Captain	Paul Burt	9/10 May 2007	Nov 2007	Op TELIC
Group Captain	Mike Wigston	Nov 2007	Apr 2008	
Group Captain	Andrew	2008	2008	
Wing Commander	Ian Richardson	2009	2009	
Wing Commander	Mark Flewin	2014	2014	
Group Captain	Charles Dickens	2019	2019	
Group Captain	Andrew Coope	Oct 2018	Mar 2019	
Group Captain	Jonathon Moreton	Apr 2019	Oct 2019	
Group Captain	Ian Townsend	Oct 2019	Feb 2020	
Wing Commander	Calvin Bailey	Feb 2020	Jul 2020	
Wing Commander	Dave Allen	Jul 2020	Jan 2021	
Wing Commander	Dinger Bell	Jan 2021	Jul 2021	
Wing Commander	Dutch Holland	Jul 2021	Jan 2022	
Wing Commander	Frazer	Jan 2022	Dec 2022	
Wing Commander	Jonathan Eastlake	Dec 2022	Apr 2023	
Wing Commander	Richard Fawkes	Apr 2023	present	

== See also ==
- Operation Herrick aerial order of battle
- International Security Assistance Force (ISAF)
