= Auster AOP.6 =

1945 reconnaissance aircraft by Auster Aircraft

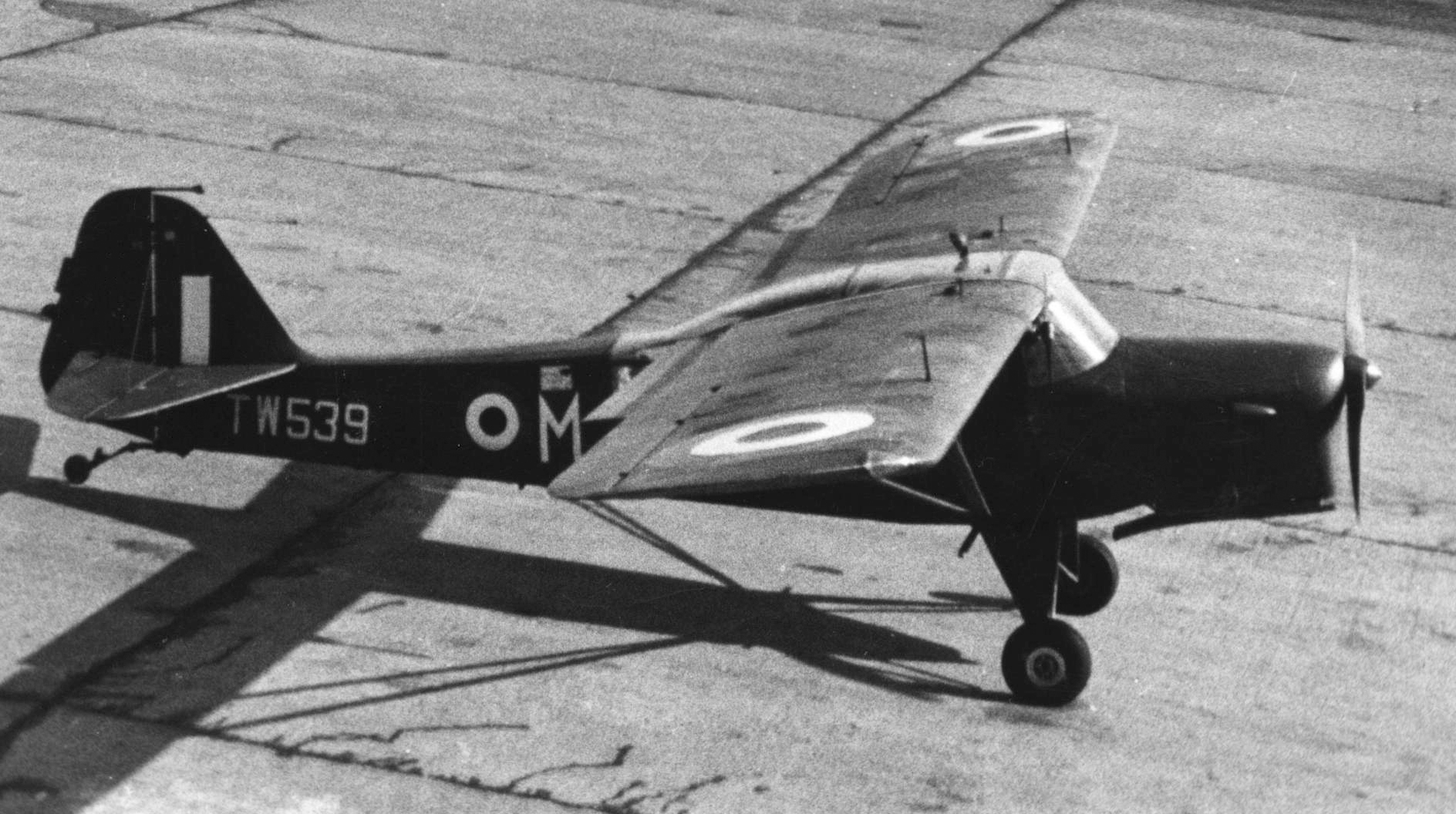
- Auster AOP.6 operational with 663 (AOP) Squadron in 1954

General information
- Type: observation aircraft
- Manufacturer: Auster Aircraft Limited
- Primary users: Royal Air Force Belgian Air Force
- Number built: AOP.6 378; T.7 84

History
- Introduction date: 1945
- Developed from: Taylorcraft Auster
- Variants: Beagle A.61 Terrier; Auster Tugmaster

The Auster AOP.6 is a British military air observation aircraft that was produced by Auster Aircraft Limited to replace the numerous wartime Taylorcraft Auster aircraft then in-service.

== History ==
The Auster AOP.6 (Auster Model K) was designed as a successor to the Taylorcraft Auster V, it had a strengthened fuselage, increased all-up weight and a 145 hp (108 kW) de Havilland Gipsy Major 7 engine. It had a different appearance to the wartime Austers due to the lengthened landing gear struts (due to the larger propeller), and external non-retractable aerofoil flaps.

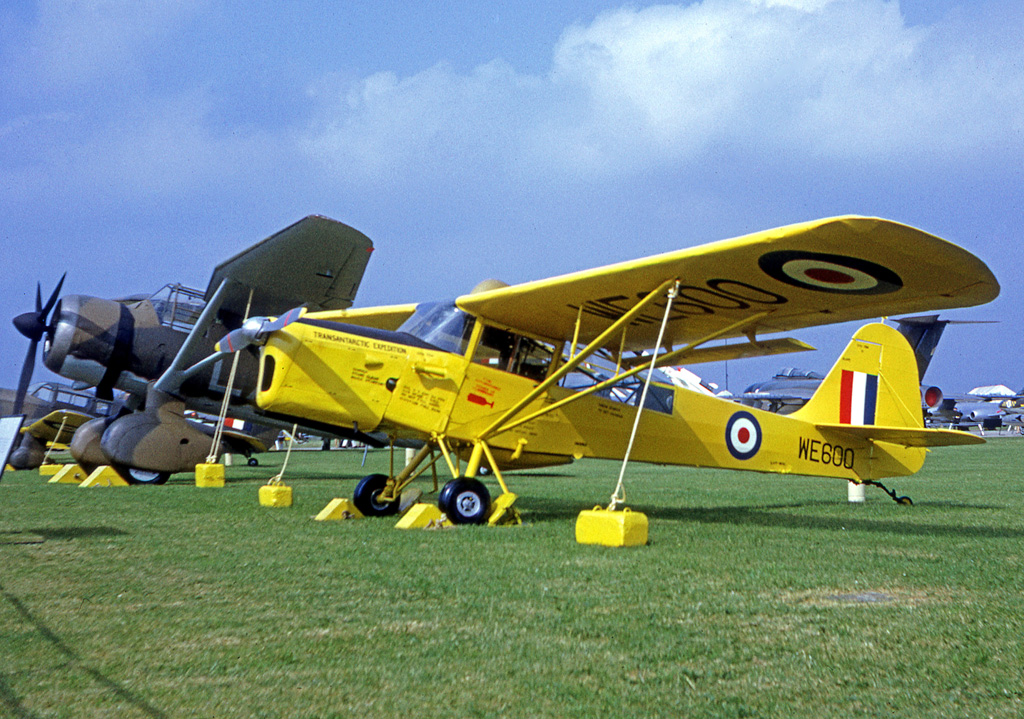
Auster Antarctic WE600 used by the Commonwealth Trans-Antarctic Expedition

An initial production run of 296 were completed for the Royal Air Force in 1949. A second batch was produced from 1952 with a total delivered of around 400. Some aircraft ordered by the Royal Air Force aircraft were diverted to the Belgian Air Force (22) and the Royal Hong Kong Auxiliary Air Force (2). New aircraft were delivered to Royal Canadian Air Force, South African Air Force, and the Arab Legion Air Force (Jordan).

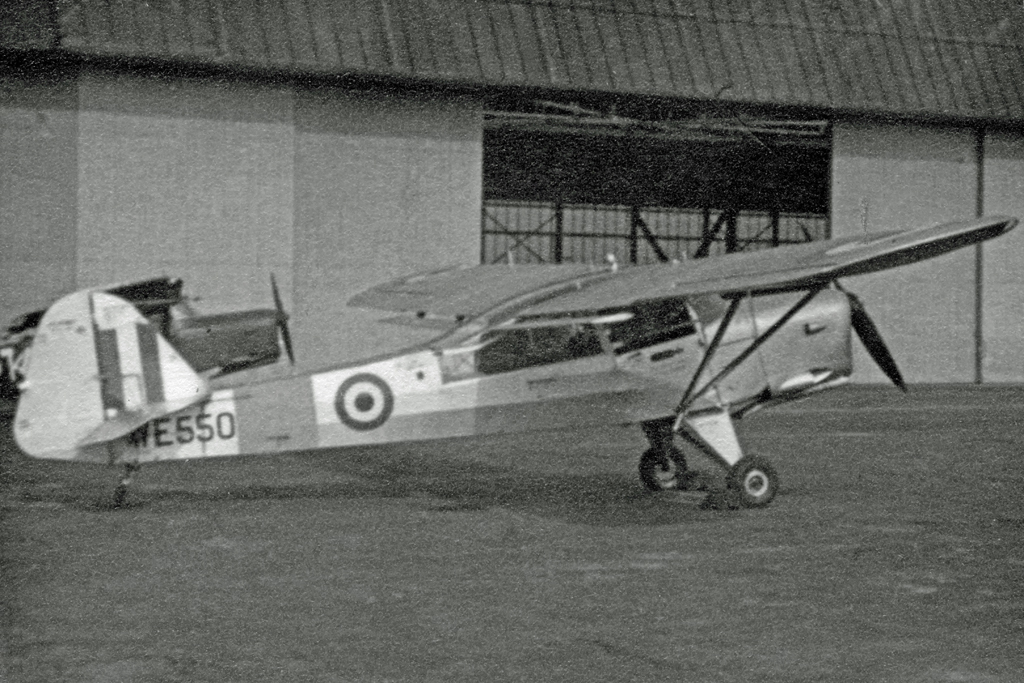
Auster T.7 training aircraft of 663 AOP Squadron in 1952.

A dual-control training version of the AOP.6 was produced, 77 serving as the Auster T.7 (Auster Model Q). These flew alongside the AOP.6 in the AOP squadrons.

In 1955 two T.7 aircraft were modified for use on the 1956 Commonwealth Trans-Antarctic Expedition, being designated Auster Antarctic (Auster Model C4). The aircraft had extra radio equipment, larger tail surfaces, the ability to be fitted with floats or skis as required and a bright yellow finish to increase visibility against the snow and ice.

The aircraft was gradually replaced with the Auster AOP.9 from 1955 and surplus aircraft were converted to civilian use, first as the Auster 6A and later as the Beagle A.61 Terrier.

== Variants ==
=== Production ===
Model K - Auster AOP.6
Production aircraft, 378 built
Model Q - Auster T.7
Dual-control training variant of the AOP.6, 84 built.
Auster AOP.8
Proposed three-seat AOP variant of the T.7, not built.

=== Conversions ===
Auster T.7 Antarctic
Two T.7s converted for use in the 1956 Commonwealth Trans-Antarctic Expedition.
Auster T.10
AOP.6s converted to T7 standard, 10 conversions.
Auster 6A Tugmaster
Former military aircraft converted for use as a civil glider tug.
Beagle A.61 Terrier
Former military aircraft converted for civil use.
Marshalls MA.4
An Auster T7 modified by Marshalls of Cambridge with a new wing and larger tailplane. Perforations in the wing, ailerons and flaps were connected to a suction pump driven by an auxiliary gas turbine engine in the fuselage. The aircraft was used for research into boundary layer control. The sole example, Serial VF665, lost control and crashed on 8 March 1966 in Suffolk, killing both crew.

== Operators ==
=== Military operators ===
Australia

- Royal Australian Air Force (Two AOP.6 aircraft only).

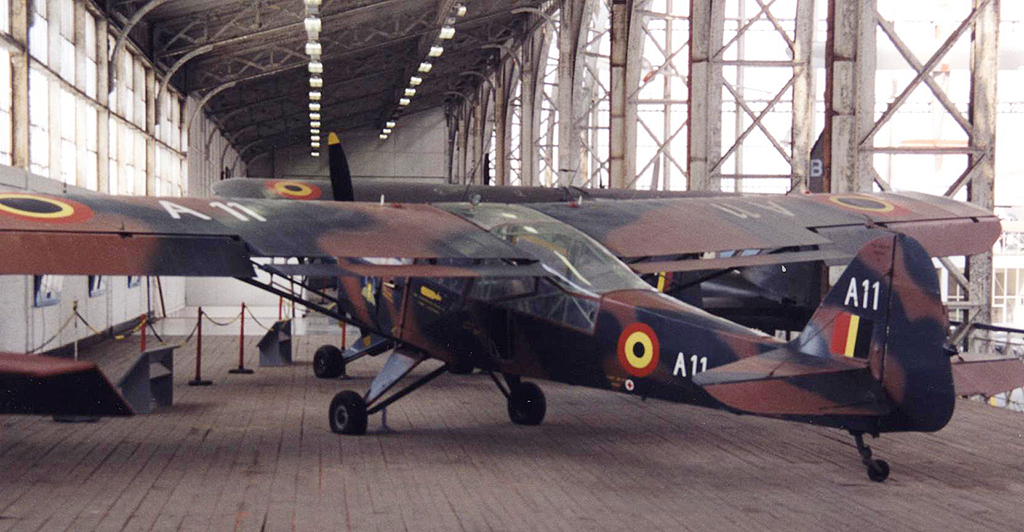
Belgian Air Force Auster AOP.6 exhibited in the Brussels Museum in April 2000

Belgium

- Belgian Army (AOP.6)
- Belgian Air Force (AOP.6)

Burma

- Burma Air Force (T.7)

Canada

- Royal Canadian Air Force (AOP.6 and T.7)

Hong Kong

- Royal Hong Kong Auxiliary Air Force

India

- Indian Air Force
- Indian Army

Jordan (Transjordania)

- Arab Legion (AOP.6 and T.7)
- Royal Jordanian Air Force

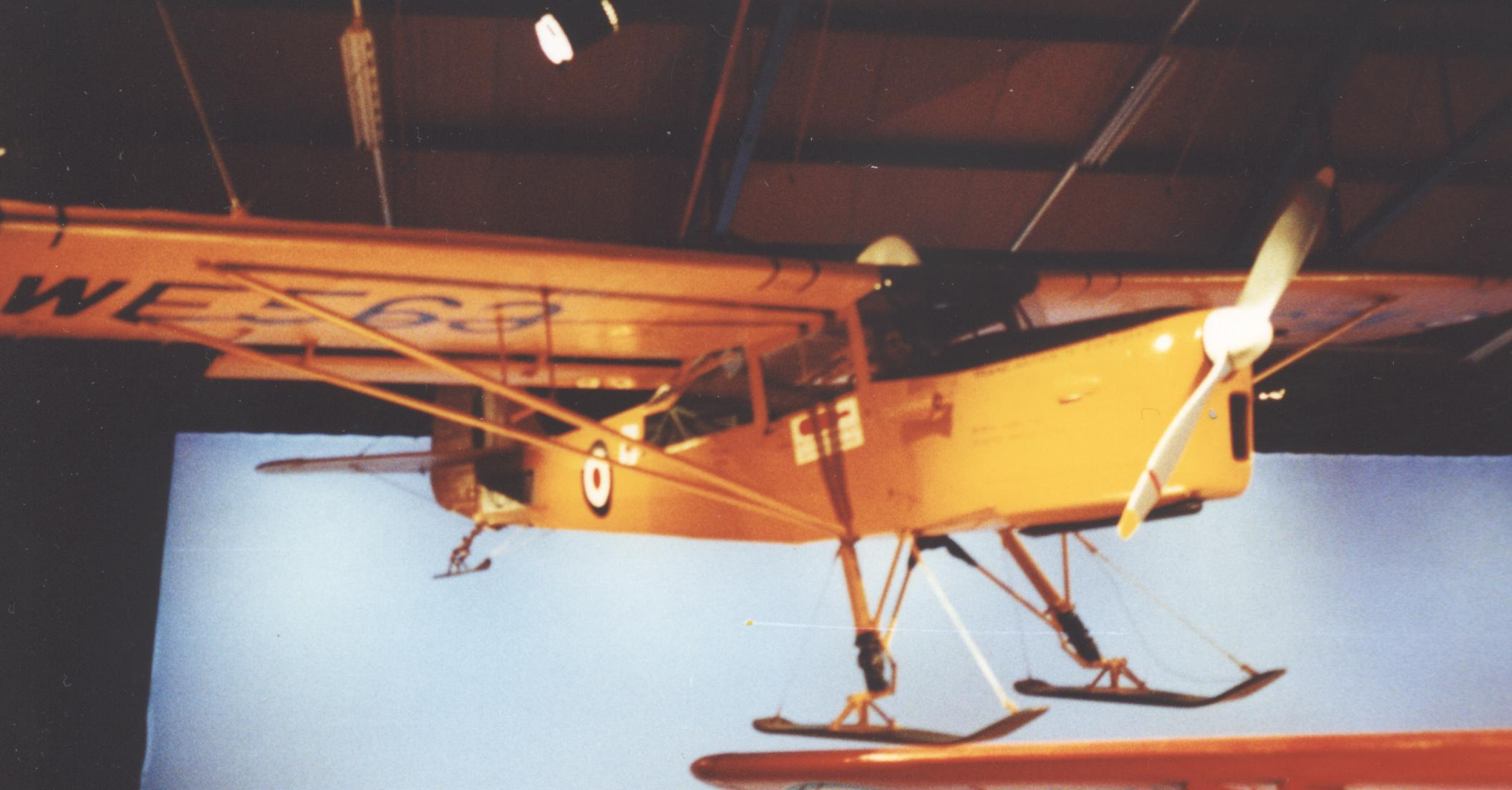
One of the two T.7C Antarctic aircraft with skis on display at the Air Force Museum of New Zealand, Wigram, near Christchurch in March 1992

New Zealand

- Royal New Zealand Air Force - One Auster T.7c was used by the RNZAF for the 1956 Commonwealth Trans-Antarctic Expedition.
  - No. 3 Squadron RNZAF

Pakistan

- Pakistan Air Force (AOP.6)
- Pakistan Army (AOP.6)
  - Pakistan Army Aviation Corps - Ex-Pakistan Air Force aircraft.

South Africa

- South African Air Force (AOP.6)

United Kingdom

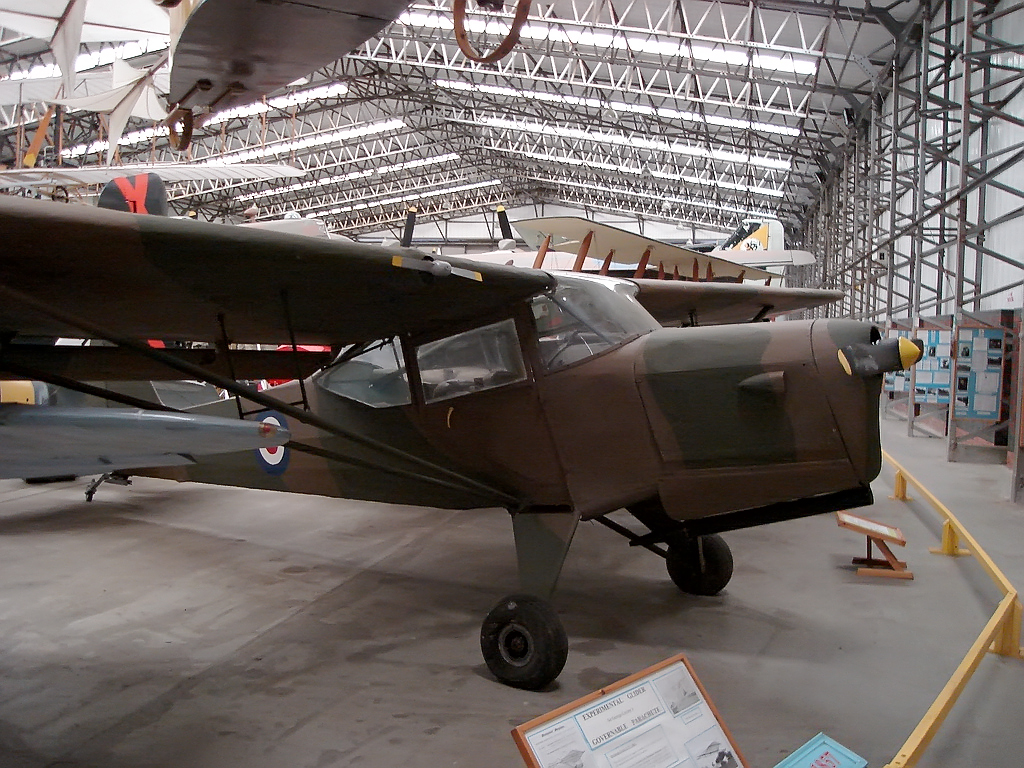
Preserved Auster AOP.6 at the Yorkshire Air Museum

- British Army
  - Army Air Corps
- Royal Air Force (AOP.6 and T.7)
  - No. 8 Squadron RAF (July 1950 - February 1952)
  - No. 209 (Hong Kong) Squadron RAF (November 1958 - March 1959)
  - No. 267 Squadron RAF (February 1954 - November 1958)
  - No. 651 Squadron RAF (March 1947 - October 1955 & November 1955 - September 1957)
  - No. 652 Squadron RAF (September 1946 - September 1957)
  - No. 656 Squadron RAF (July 1950 - April 1956)
  - No. 657 Squadron RAF (June 1946 - November 1955)
  - No. 659 Squadron RAF (May - August 1947)
  - No. 661 Squadron RAF (May 1949 - February 1957)
  - No. 662 Squadron RAF (February 1949 - February 1957)
  - No. 663 Squadron RAF (July 1949 - February 1957)
  - No. 664 Squadron RAF (September 1949 - March 1957)
  - No. 666 Squadron RAF (June 1949 - March 1957)
  - No. 227 Operational Conversion Unit RAF

== Specifications (AOP.6) ==
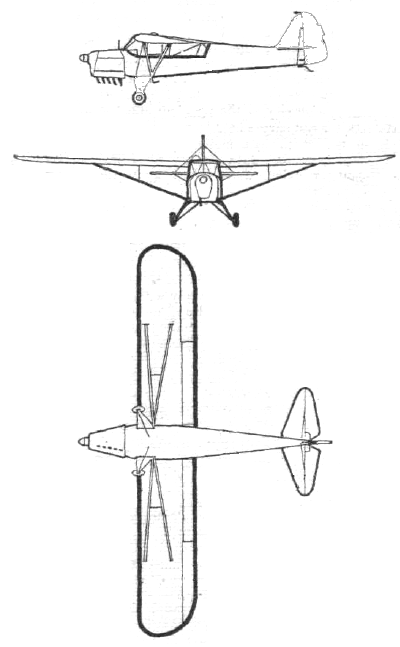
Auster AOP.6

Data from Macdonald Aircraft Handbook

General characteristics

- Crew: 2
- Length: 23 ft 9 in (7.24 m)
- Wingspan: 36 ft 0 in (10.97 m)
- Height: 8 ft 4.5 in (2.553 m)
- Wing area: 184 sq ft (17.1 m^{2}) excluding flaps
- Empty weight: 1,413 lb (641 kg)
- Max takeoff weight: 2,160 lb (980 kg)
- Fuel capacity: 23 imp gal (28 US gal; 105 L)
- Powerplant: 1 × de Havilland Gipsy Major 7 4-cylinder air-cooled inverted in-line piston engine, 145 hp (108 kW)
- Propellers: 2-bladed fixed-pitch propeller

Performance

- Maximum speed: 124 mph (200 km/h, 108 kn) at 1,000 ft (305 m)
- Cruise speed: 108 mph (174 km/h, 94 kn)
- Landing speed: 32 mph (28 kn; 51 km/h) with flaps
- Range: 315 mi (507 km, 274 nmi)
- Service ceiling: 14,000 ft (4,300 m)
- Rate of climb: 810 ft/min (4.1 m/s) at 1,800 lb (816 kg)
- Wing loading: 11.7 lb/sq ft (57 kg/m^{2})
- Power/mass: 0.0676 hp/lb (0.1111 kW/kg)

== See also ==
Related development

- Auster AOP.9
