= Auster Tugmaster =

Auster 6A Tugmaster
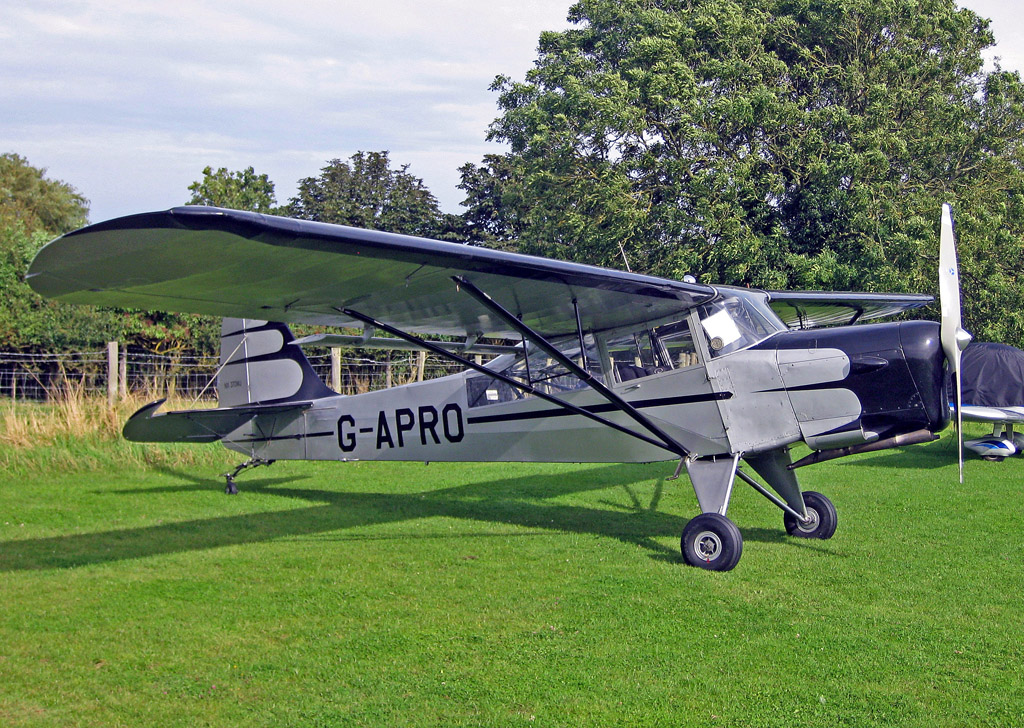
- Privately owned Auster Tugmaster active in 2012

General information
- Type: Glider Tug
- National origin: United Kingdom
- Manufacturer: Auster
- Status: In active service (2014)
- Primary user: Gliding clubs
- Number built: 34

History
- Introduction date: 1960
- First flight: 5 July 1960
- Developed from: Auster AOP.6

The Auster 6A Tugmaster was a British high-wing monoplane glider tug converted from surplus former military Auster AOP.6s.

== Development ==
The Auster Tugmaster is a high-wing braced monoplane with a fixed tailwheel landing gear and powered by a de Havilland Gipsy Major engine. The Tugmasters had their engines modified to civilian standards as the Gipsy Major 10 and they were also fitted with larger tail surfaces. Because of the original radio fit had been removed the second passenger sat in a sideways-facing seat behind the pilot and not side-by-side although three aircraft were fitted with dual controls and side-by-side seating.

When the Auster AOP.9 was introduced into British Army service from 1959, Auster Aircraft bought 104 surviving and now surplus Auster AOP.6 and T.7s. Initially 29 airframes were modified for glider towing as the Auster 6A Tugmaster. Each individual aircraft was stripped as necessary and re-built with minimum cost in a maximum of 400 manhours, with a selling price of £995. Subsequently, about 50 were converted as three-seater touring aircraft for civilian use as the Auster 6B, later designated as the Beagle A.61 Terrier.

The first conversion, test registration G-25-9, flew on 5 July 1960 and was produced by Air Tows Ltd at Lasham and was fitted with an electrically-driven winch; five more were modified by Air Tows. Twenty one were converted by Auster at Rearsby with a conventional Auster-designed towing hook. Other conversions were carried out by a number of organisations including one by British European Airways employees at London Heathrow Airport for their own gliding club at Booker. Some surplus Royal Canadian Air Force Auster AOP.6 aircraft were also converted in Canada for glider towing.

Examples of the Tugmaster were exported to Finland, Norway and Sweden. Several Tugmasters remain in service with UK gliding clubs (2014).

== Specifications ==
Data from

General characteristics

- Crew: 2
- Length: 23 ft 9 in (7.24 m)
- Wingspan: 36 ft 0 in (10.97 m)
- Height: 8 ft 4 in (2.55 m)
- Wing area: 184.0 sq ft (17.09 m^{2})
- Empty weight: 1,480 lb (671 kg)
- Max takeoff weight: 2,200 lb (998 kg)
- Powerplant: 1 × de Havilland Gipsy Major 10 inline piston engine, 145 hp (108 kW)
- Propellers: 2-bladed Fairey Reed A66696x3

Performance

- Maximum speed: 121 mph (195 km/h, 105 kn)
- Cruise speed: 105 mph (169 km/h, 91 kn)
- Service ceiling: 14,000 ft (4,300 m)
- Rate of climb: 810 ft/min (4.1 m/s)

== See also ==
Related development

- Auster AOP.6
- Beagle Terrier
