= 857 Naval Air Squadron =

Inactive flying squadron of the Royal Navy's Fleet Air Arm

- Squadron badge
- Active: 1944–1945; 2006–2015
- Disbanded: 30 January 2015
- Country: United Kingdom
- Branch: Royal Navy
- Type: Torpedo Bomber Reconnaissance squadron
- Role: Carrier-based: anti-submarine warfare (ASW); anti-surface warfare (ASuW); Carrier-based Airborne Surveillance and Control (ASaC)
- Part of: Fleet Air Arm
- Home station: See Naval air stations section for full list.
- Mottos: Animis opiusque parati (Latin for 'Prepared in minds and resources')
- Engagements: World War II: Operation Meridian; Operation Iceberg; War in Afghanistan: Operation Herrick; Persian Gulf: Operation Kipion
- Battle honours: Palembang 1945; Okinawa 1945; East Indies 1945

Commanders
- Notable commanders: Lieutenant Commander(A) W. Stuart, DSC & Two Bars, RNVR

Insignia
- Squadron Badge Description: Blue, issuant from water barry wavy of six white and blue a dexter hand proper grasping a short sword white pommel and hilt gold (1944)
- Identification Markings: 7A+ (Avenger); W7A+ (Avenger November 1944); WIA+ (Avenger January 1945); 370-386 (Avenger August 1945); 180-192 (Sea King)
- Fin Carrier Codes: W (Avenger August 1945)

Aircraft flown
- Bomber: Grumman Avenger
- Helicopter: Westland Sea King

857 Naval Air Squadron (857 NAS), also known as 857 Squadron, is an inactive Fleet Air Arm (FAA) naval air squadron of the United Kingdom's Royal Navy (RN). It most recently operated the Westland Sea King ASaC.7 Airborne Early Warning helicopter between December 2006 and January 2015, based out of RNAS Culdrose, Cornwall.

It was established at Squantum in the United States as a Torpedo Bomber Reconnaissance squadron in April 1944. It boarded HMS Rajah in June, landed in HMS Gadwall, RNAMY Belfast, Northern Ireland, in July, with anti-submarine training at HMS Landrail, RNAS Machrihanish, Argyll and Bute, Scotland. The squadron re-embarked in September for Ceylon, spending time on land at HMS Garuda, RNARY Coimbatore, India and HMS Ukussa, RNAS Katukurunda, Ceylon, before boarding HMS Indomitable in November. Throughout the winter, using the carrier and HMS Nabbington, RNAS Nowra, Australia as a shore base, the squadron targeted locations in Sumatra, including Palembang, before shifting focus to Sakashima Gunto and Formosa in the spring. The squadron returned to the Far East after VJ-Day to engage Japanese suicide boats off Hong Kong. After leaving its aircraft in Australia, the squadron returned home and was disbanded in November 1945.

857 Naval Air Squadron reformed at Culdrose from 849 Naval Air Squadron 'B' Flight in December 2006, conducting maritime security operations in February 2007 off the Horn of Africa, a section of the squadron returning early to the UK to embark in HMS Illustrious for a trip to the United States. The squadron deployed in the Indian Ocean in March 2008 and deployed to Afghanistan in October 2009, for surveillance operations in support of coalition forces and helping to combat the flow of drugs and IEDs around Helmand Province. The squadron again deployed to Camp Bastion in July for a further five months. Due to return to Afghanistan in 2011, the squadron instead embarked in HMS Ocean in May and saw operational service off Libya. It relieved 854 Naval Air Squadron at Camp Bastion in February 2012. After a final deployment on Operation Kipion towards the end of 2014, the squadron disbanded in January 2015, becoming 849 Naval Air Squadron "Palembang Flight".

== History ==
=== Torpedo Bomber Reconnaissance squadron (1944–1945) ===
On 23 February 1944, the personnel for 857 Naval Air Squadron gathered at Royal Naval Air Establishment (RNAE) Townhill Camp (HMS Waxwing), Dunfermline, Fife, Scotland, in preparation for their journey to the United States.

==== Formation and work-up ====
The squadron was officially established on 1 April in RN Air Section Squantum, which was situated at Naval Air Station Squantum, Quincy, Massachusetts, designated as a Torpedo Bomber Reconnaissance unit, equipped with twelve Grumman Avenger Mk.II torpedo bomber aircraft, which embarked aboard the escort carrier HMS Rajah on 29 June.

The escort carrier's cargo comprised the aircraft belonging to both 857 and 1842 Naval Air Squadron, which were being transported to the UK, along with the aircrews and personnel from both squadrons. After completing the loading process, HMS Rajah departed for New York, where it joined the eastbound convoy TCU 30, consisting of troopships and merchant vessels, on 2 July. HMS Rajah reached Liverpool on 12 July, where it unloaded supplies and the aircraft of 1842 Naval Air Squadron, before continuing to Belfast the following day.

On 13 July, the squadron disembarked to RNAMY Belfast (HMS Gadwall), County Antrim, Northern Ireland and subsequently received an additional nine Grumman Avenger torpedo bomber aircraft and the squadron were prepared for anti-submarine warfare training at RNAS Machrihanish (HMS Landrail), Argyll and Bute, Scotland.

==== Far East ====
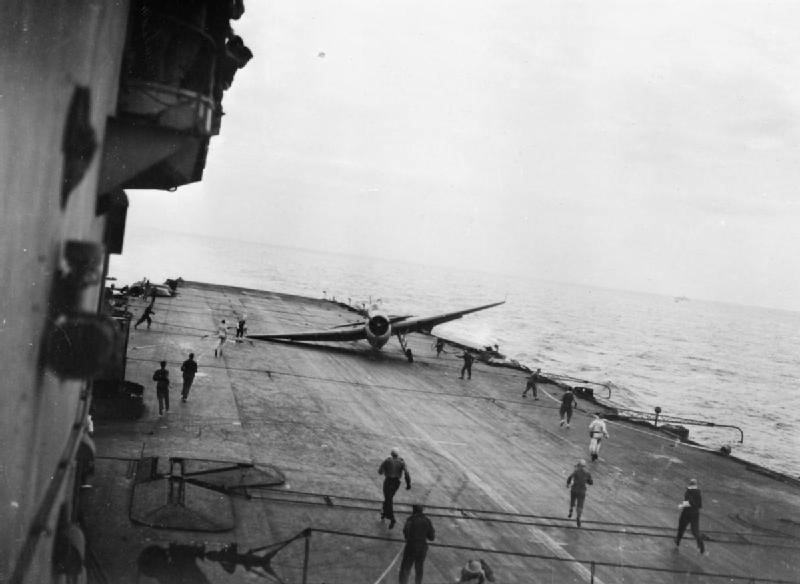
Grumman Avenger of 857 NAS, with only one wheel down, landing on board HMS Indomitable

It sailed for the Far East in September 1944 embarked on HMS Rajah and transferring to HMS Indomitable in November 1944. HMS Rajah had set sail on 9 September for Ceylon, where the squadron spent some time on land at RNARY Coimbatore (HMS Garuda), Peelamedu, Coimbatore, Southern India and RNAS Katukurunda (HMS Ukussa), Katukurunda, Ceylon, before it embarked in the fleet carrier HMS Indomitable on 27 November.

During the remainder of the winter season, the squadron utilised the aircraft carrier and the MONAB HMS Nabbington, at Nowra, Australia, as a shore base of operations to conduct assaults on various targets in Sumatra, such as Belawan Deli, Pangkalan Brandan, and Palembang. Subsequently, in the spring, the squadron shifted its focus to targets located in the Sakashima Gunto, in the East China Sea and Formosa regions. In March, the commanding officer experienced two separate incidents in which he was forced to abandon his aircraft. Following the first incident, he successfully returned to his squadron the next day, while after the second incident, he re-joined his unit four weeks later. In both cases, he and his crew were ultimately rescued by a submarine.

Following the conclusion of World War II, specifically after Victory over Japan Day, the squadron redeployed to the Far East to engage in operations targeting Japanese suicide boats in the vicinity of Hong Kong on the dates of 31 August and 1 September. The aircraft utilised for these missions were left in Australia, and subsequently, the squadron made its way back to the UK. Ultimately, the squadron was officially disbanded on 30 November 1945.

=== Sea King (2006–2015) ===
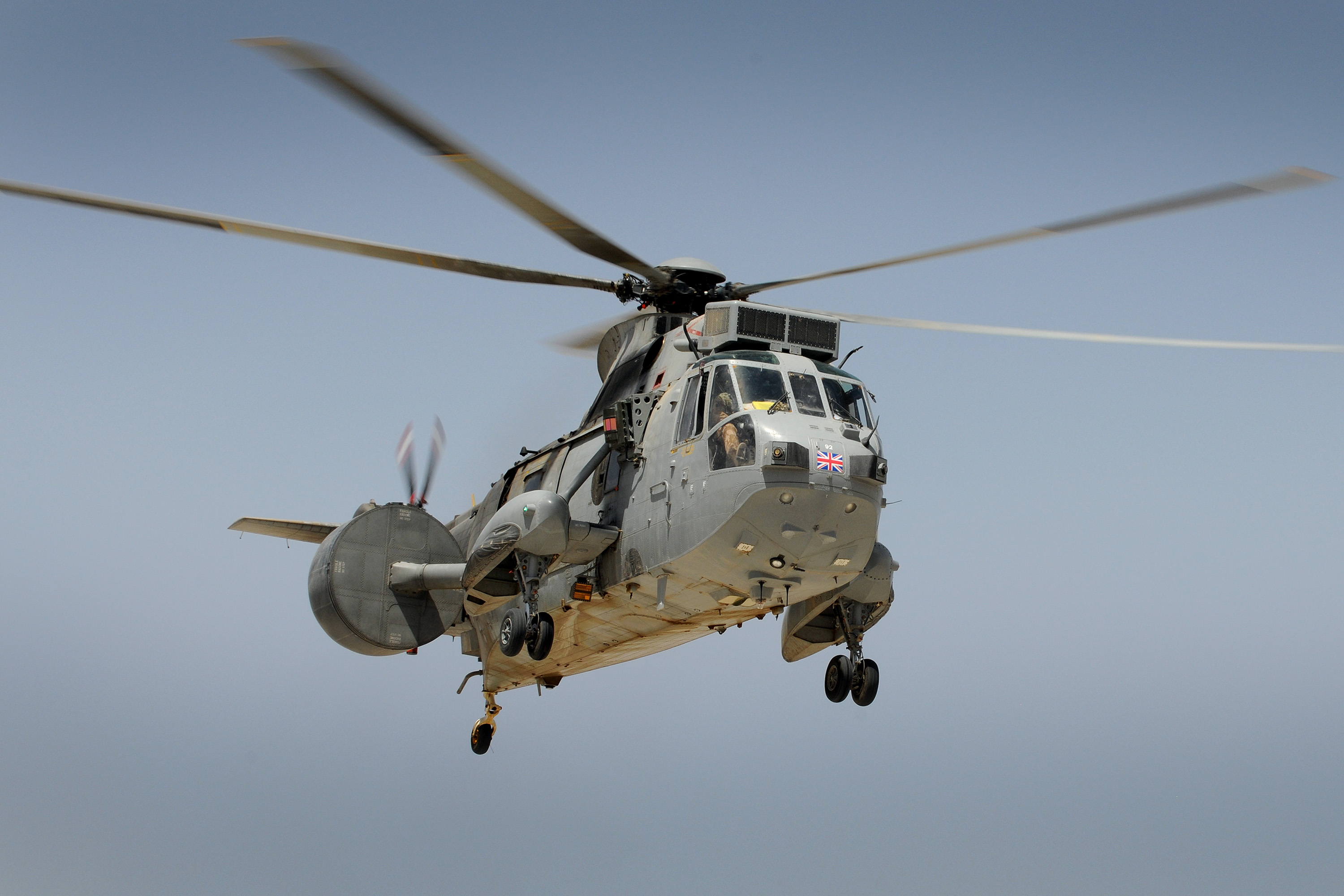
Westland Sea King Mk7 Airborne Surveillance and Control (ASaC.7)

857 Naval Air Squadron was reformed at RNAS Culdrose (HMS Seahawk) in Cornwall, England, with Westland Sea King ASaC.7 airborne early warning (AEW) variant, on 13 December 2006, originating from B Flight of 849 Naval Air Squadron. The squadron commenced maritime security operations off the Horn of Africa aboard RFA Fort Austin in February 2007, with aims of denying the passage of the seas to Al Qaeda, pirates, traffickers and smugglers. The squadron then embarked in HMS Illustrious and headed to NAS Norfolk in Virginia, United States, for exercises with United States Navy fighter planes and carrier battle groups.

857 Naval Air Squadron returned to the Middle East in the first half of 2008, replacing its sister squadron 854 Naval Air Squadron on Operation Calash. It returned to carrying out maritime security operations. The squadron carried out operations in the North Sea on board HMS Illustrious, testing airborne early warning capabilities.

In October 2009, 857 Naval Air Squadron was deployed to Afghanistan, once again replacing 854 Naval Air Squadron, to conduct surveillance operations in support of coalition forces and to assist in countering the trafficking of drugs and improvised explosive devices in Helmand Province. The squadron returned to RNAS Culdrose in March 2010, only to redeploy to Camp Bastion in July for an additional five months.

In 2011, several of the Sea Kings were stated to be part of the Response Force Task Group.

Although scheduled to return to Afghanistan in 2011, the squadron instead embarked on HMS Ocean in May, participating in operational missions off the coast of Libya before returning to RNAS Culdrose later that year. In February 2012, it relieved 854 Naval Air Squadron at Camp Bastion. By the time of its withdrawal in May 2014, the two squadrons had collectively achieved over 9,000 hours of operational flying in the theatre. Following a final deployment to the Gulf for Operation Kipion from September to December 2014, the squadron was disbanded in January 2015, subsequently becoming "Palembang Flight" of 849 Naval Air Squadron.

== Aircraft operated ==
The squadron has operated two variants of a fixed wing and a single rotary wing aircraft type:

- Grumman Avenger Mk.II torpedo bomber aircraft (April 1944 - October 1945)
- Grumman Avenger Mk.I torpedo bomber aircraft (September 1944 - June 1945)
- Westland Sea King ASaC.7 Airborne Early Warning helicopter (December 2006 - January 2015)

== Battle honours ==
The following Battle Honours have been awarded to 857 Naval Air Squadron.

- East Indies 1944-45
- Palenbang 1945
- Okinawa 1945

== Assignments ==
857 Naval Air Squadron was assigned as needed to form part of a number of larger units:

- 11th Carrier Air Group (30 June - 30 November 1945)

== Naval air stations and aircraft carriers ==
857 Naval Air Squadron operated from a number of naval air stations of the Royal Navy in the UK and overseas, and also a number of Royal Navy fleet carriers and escort carriers and other airbases overseas:

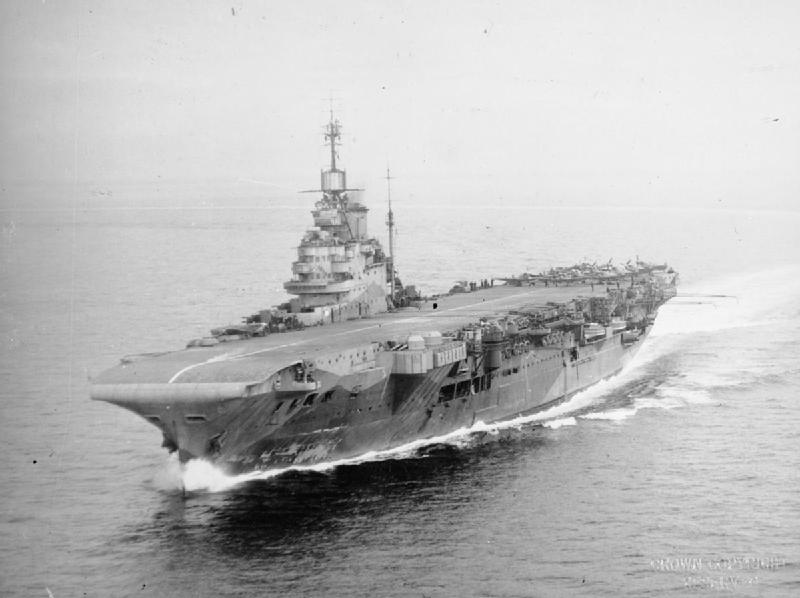
HMS Indomitable

1944 - 1945

- RN Air Section Squantum, Massachusetts, (1 April - 27 June 1944)
  - RN Air Section Norfolk, Virginia, (Detachment deck landing training (DLT) USS Charger 15 - 17 May 1944)
- RN Air Section Norfolk, Virginia, (27 - 29 June 1944)
- HMS Rajah (29 June - 15 July 1944)
- Royal Naval Aircraft Maintenance Yard Belfast (HMS Gadwall), County Antrim, (15 July - 14 August 1944)
- Royal Naval Air Station Machrihanish (HMS Landrail), Argyll and Bute, (14 August - 8 September 1944)
- Royal Naval Aircraft Maintenance Yard Belfast (HMS Landrail), Argyll and Bute, (8 - 9 September 1944)
- HMS Rajah (9 September - 5 October 1944)
- RN Air Section Cochin, India, (5 - 11 October 1944)
- Royal Naval Aircraft Repair Yard Coimbatore (HMS Garuda), India, (11 October - 9 November 1944)
- Royal Naval Air Station Katukurunda (HMS Ukussa), Ceylon, (9 - 27 November 1944)
- HMS Indomitable (27 November 1944 - 5 June 1945)
  - Royal Naval Air Station Trincomalee (HMS Bambara), Ceylon, (Detachment five aircraft 8 - 14 December 1944)
  - Royal Naval Air Station Nowra (HMS Nabbington), New South Wales, (Detachment nine aircraft 9 - 28 February 1945)
  - HMS Indefatigable (Detachment five aircraft 1 - 2 March 1945)
- Royal Naval Air Station Nowra (HMS Nabbington), New South Wales, (5 June - 2 August 1945)
- HMS Indomitable (2 August - 11 October 1945)
- Royal Naval Air Station Nowra (HMS Nabbington), New South Wales, (11 - 22 October 1945)
- HMS Indomitable (crews 22 October - 30 November 1945)
- disbanded - UK (30 November 1945)

2006 - 2015

- Royal Naval Air Station Culdrose (HMS Seahawk), Cornwall, (13 December 2006 - 10 June 2007)
- RFA Fort Austin (5 February - 2 July 2007
- Royal Naval Air Station Culdrose (HMS Seahawk), Cornwall, (10 - 24 June 2007)
- HMS Illustrious (24 June - 11 July 2007)

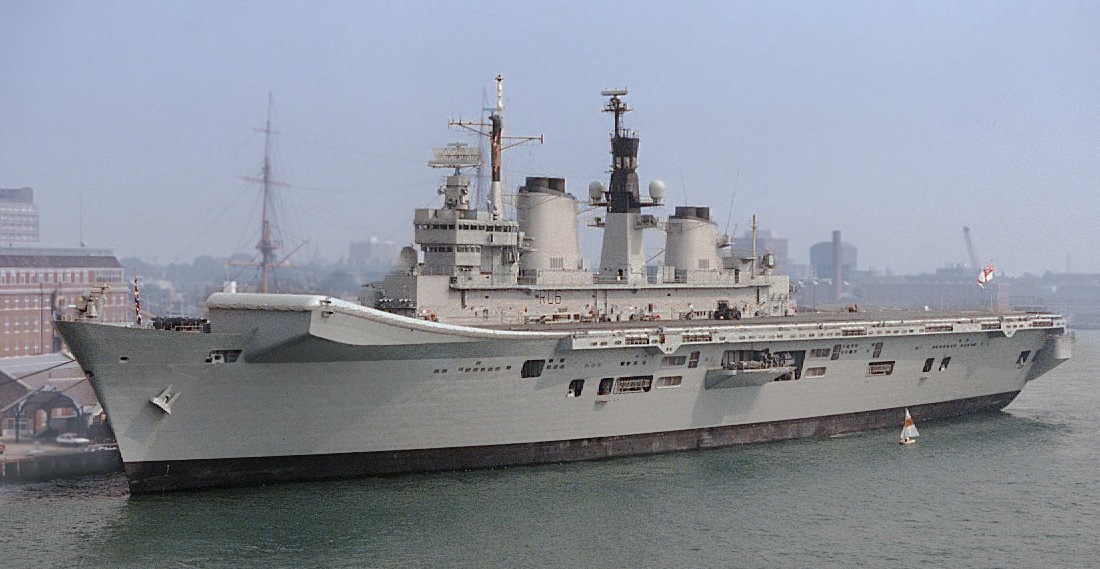
HMS Illustrious

- Naval Station Norfolk Chambers Field, Virginia, (11 - 21 July 2007)
- HMS Illustrious (21 July - 9 August 2007)
- Royal Naval Air Station Culdrose (HMS Seahawk), Cornwall, (9 August - 14 September 2007)
- Royal Air Force Leuchars, Fife, (14 - 28 September 2007)
- Royal Naval Air Station Culdrose (HMS Seahawk), Cornwall, (28 September - 1 November 2007)
- Royal Naval Air Station Yeovilton (HMS Heron), Somerset, (1 - 15 November 2007)
- Royal Naval Air Station Culdrose (HMS Seahawk), Cornwall, (15 November 2007 - 19 March 2008)
- RFA Argus (19 March - 22 July 2008)
- Royal Naval Air Station Culdrose (HMS Seahawk), Cornwall, (22 July - 22 September 2008)
- HMS Illustrious (22 September - 22 October 2008)
- Royal Naval Air Station Culdrose (HMS Seahawk), Cornwall, (22 October 2008 - 3 February 2009)
  - Royal Air Force Aldergrove, County Antrim, (Detachment one helicopter 17 - 21 November 2008)

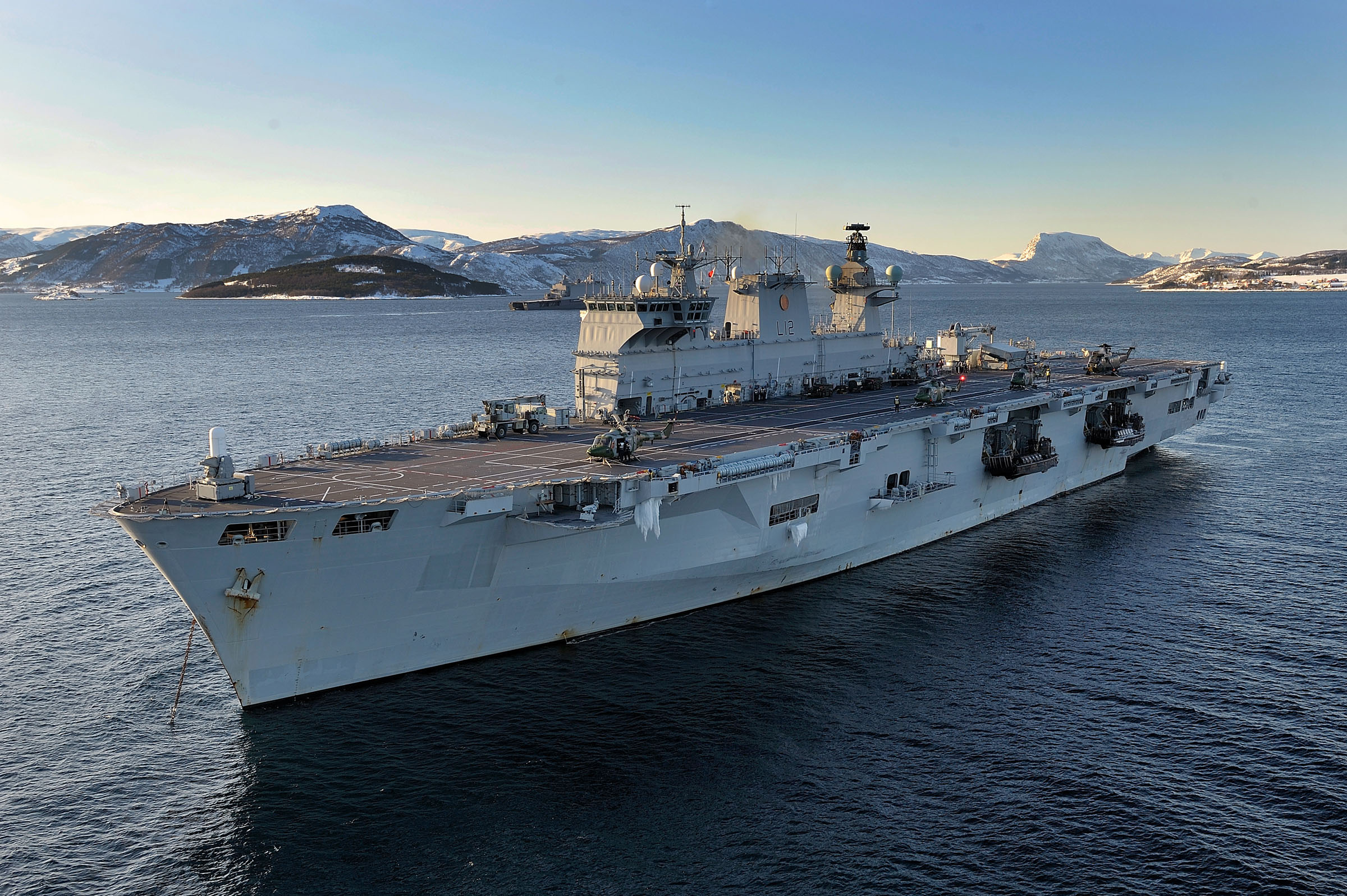
HMS Ocean

- HMS Ocean (3 February - 11 March 2009)
- RFA Fort Austin (11 March - 13 April 2009)
- Royal Naval Air Station Culdrose (HMS Seahawk), Cornwall, (13 April - 11 July 2009)
- Army Air Corps Netheravon, Wiltshire, (11 - 21 July 2009)
- Royal Naval Air Station Culdrose (HMS Seahawk), Cornwall, (21 July - 1 October 2009)
- Camp Bastion, Afghanistan, (1 October 2009 - 7 March 2010)
- Royal Naval Air Station Culdrose (HMS Seahawk), Cornwall, (7 March - 25 July 2010)
- Camp Bastion, Afghanistan, (25 July - 10 December 2010)
- Royal Naval Air Station Culdrose (HMS Seahawk), Cornwall, (10 December 2010 - 25 February 2012)
  - HMS Ocean (Detachment two aircraft 2 - 9 April 2011)
- Camp Bastion, Afghanistan, (25 February 2012 - 20 May 2014)
- Royal Naval Air Station Culdrose (HMS Seahawk), Cornwall, (20 May - 20 September 2014)
  - RFA Argus (Detachment two helicopters 14 - 25 July 2014)
- Al Minhad Air Base, United Arab Emirates, (20 September - 15 December 2014)
- Royal Naval Air Station Culdrose (HMS Seahawk), Cornwall, (15 December 2014 - 30 January 2015)
- disbanded - (30 January 2015)

== Commanding officers ==
List of commanding officers of 857 Naval Air Squadron:

1944 - 1945

- Lieutenant Commander(A) W. Stuart, DSC & Two Bars, RNVR, from 1 April 1944
- Lieutenant(A) H. O'Donnell, RNVR, from 31 March 1945
- Lieutenant(A) P.F. Morris, RNVR, from 8 April 1945
- Lieutenant Commander(A) W. Stuart, DSC and 2 Bars, RNVR, from 23 April 1945
- disbanded - 30 November 1945

2006 - 2015

- Lieutenant Commander P.M. Jefferson, RN, from 13 December 2006
- Lieutenant Commander G.C.S. Smith, RN, from 9 February 2007
- Lieutenant Commander S. Lynch, RN, from 28 May 2008
- Lieutenant Commander G. Haywood, RN, from 13 July 2010
- Lieutenant Commander M.H. Gill, RN, from 5 November 2012
- Lieutenant Commander J.E. Hall, RN, from 7 March 2014
- disbanded - 30 January 2015

Note: Abbreviation (A) signifies Air Branch of the RN or RNVR.

== See also ==
- Operation Herrick aerial order of battle
