= Nick Tindal =

British naval officer

Commodore Nick Tindal
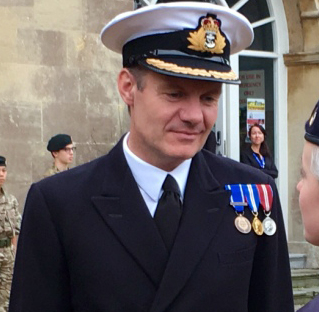
- Military career
- Allegiance: United Kingdom
- Branch: Royal Navy
- Service years: 1986-2020
- Rank: Commodore
- Commands: HMS Dumbarton Castle; HMS Alderney; RNAS Yeovilton

Commodore Nicholas Henry Charles Tindal is a senior Royal Navy officer who served as the commanding officer of RNAS Yeovilton until July 2020.

== Biography ==
Commissioned in 1986, Tindal gained his bridge watch-keeping certificate and first experience of maritime aviation while serving as a fighter controller in HMS Ark Royal. Awarded his pilot's 'wings' in 1989, his early aviation career included tours flying the anti-submarine warfare Sea King (814 Naval Air Squadron) and multi-role Lynx (815 Naval Air Squadron) helicopters on board a variety of aircraft carriers, frigates, destroyers, and Royal Fleet Auxiliary vessels, conducting over 1000 deck landings.

He is also a principal warfare officer, specialised in above-water warfare and was HMS Argyll's operations officer. He has commanded the corvette HMS Dumbarton Castle, which, as the RN's only permanent warship in the South Atlantic, played a key role in looking after UK interests in the Falkland Islands and South Georgia. He also had command of HMS Alderney, an offshore patrol vessel based in the UK to support the policing of the UK's economic exclusion zone. Ashore, he is an alumnus of the Advanced Command and Staff Course, gaining a King's College London master's degree in defence studies. Subsequent staff appointments have included a tour at the Permanent Joint Headquarters, where he led the operations team supporting the UK's overseas counter-terrorism effort and two tours at the Ministry of Defence, first in the directorate of Joint Capability leading Defence's Carrier Strike concept development and then, on promotion to captain in 2012, as the operations directorate assistant head responsible for operational capability advice in support of ongoing and contingent operations.

He has had RN staff tours as the pilots appointer in 2001 and as Navy Command's aviation division chief of staff in 2011–2012. He has also had two exchange appointments with the United States Navy, first as part of the US Atlantic Fleet team responsible for the embarked training and certification of all 'East Coast' carrier and expeditionary strike groups. Second, immediately prior to taking command of RNAS Yeovilton, he was the Royal Navy's first-ever officer to work for the Commander US Pacific Fleet based in Pearl Harbor, Hawaii, an admiral responsible for US maritime operations across half the globe.
