= No. 659 Squadron AAC =

Flying squadron of the British Army's Army Air Corps

No. 659 Squadron AAC No. 659 Squadron RAF
- Active: 30 April 1943 – 14 August 1947 (RAF); 1 November 1971 – present
- Country: United Kingdom
- Branch: (United Kingdom) British Army
- Part of: 1 Regiment Army Air Corps
- Garrison/HQ: RNAS Yeovilton (HMS Heron)
- Mottos: Latin: Quovis per ardua (Translation: "Everywhere through difficulties")

Insignia
- Squadron Badge heraldry: A hawk volant affrontée the head to the dexter

Aircraft flown
- Helicopter: AgustaWestland Wildcat AH.1

No. 659 Squadron AAC is a squadron of the British Army's Army Air Corps (AAC) based at RNAS Yeovilton (HMS Heron) flying AgustaWestland Wildcat AH.1 helicopters as part of 1 Regiment Army Air Corps. It was formerly No. 659 Squadron RAF, a Royal Air Force air observation post squadron associated with the 21st Army Group during World War II. Numbers 651 to 663 Squadrons of the RAF were air observation post units working closely with Army units in artillery spotting and liaison. Their duties and squadron numbers were transferred to the Army with the formation of the Army Air Corps on 1 September 1957.

== History ==
=== Royal Air Force ===
No. 659 Squadron was formed at RAF Firbeck on 30 April 1943 with the Auster III and from March 1944 the Auster IV. The squadron role was to support the Army and in June 1944 it moved to France. Fighting in the break-out from Normandy it followed the army across the low countries and into Germany. In October 1945 the squadron left for India, where it was eventually disbanded at Lahore on 14 August 1947.

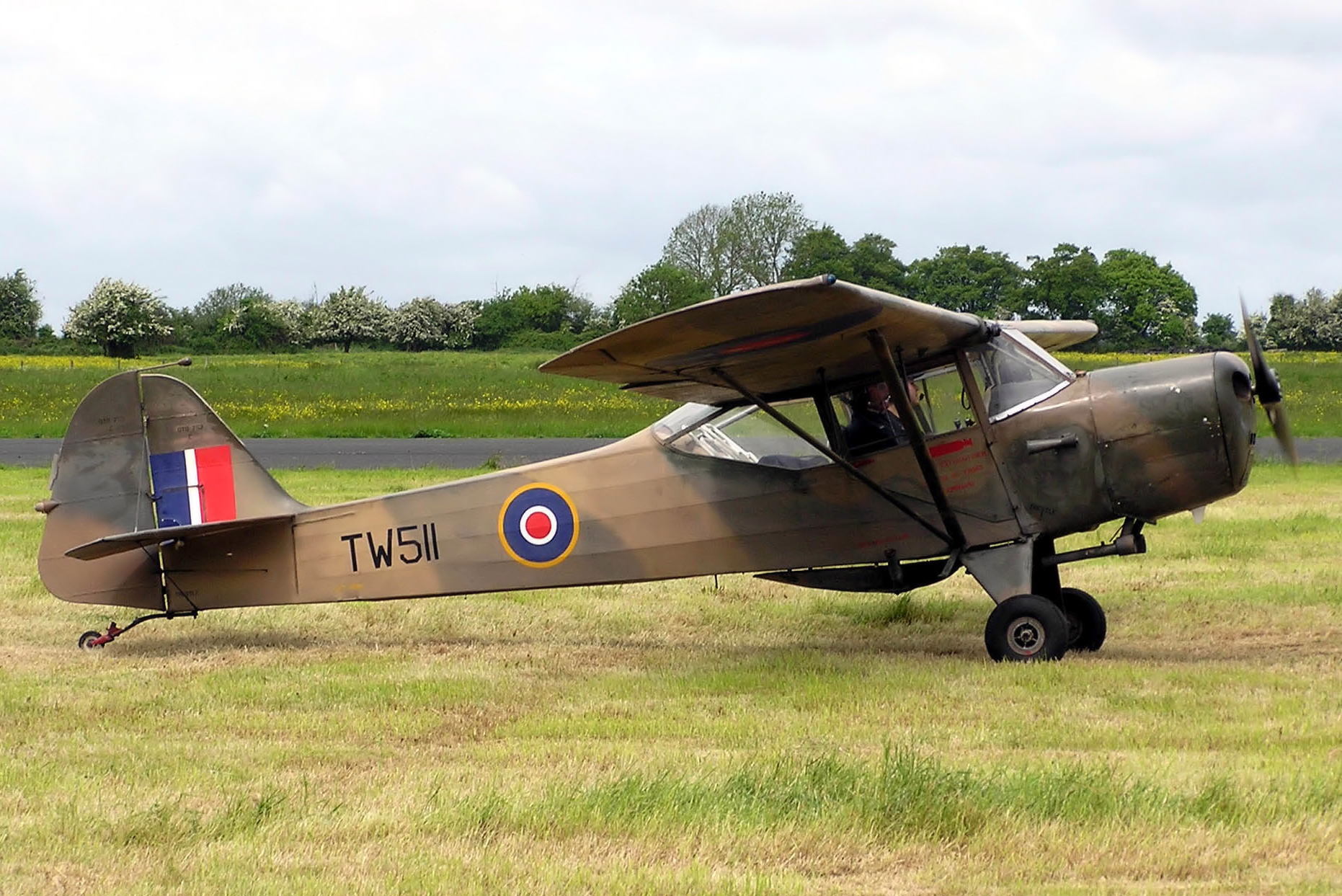
A postwar Auster Mk.V, restored in wartime colours.

Aircraft operated by no. 659 Squadron RAF, data from
From	To	Aircraft	Variant
May 1943	March 1944	Auster	Mk.III
March 1944	July 1945	Auster	Mk.IV
July 1944	August 1947	Auster	Mk.V
May 1946	August 1947	Auster	AOP.6

=== Army Air Corps ===
On 1 November 1971 the squadron was reformed while in Germany.

== See also ==
- List of Army Air Corps aircraft units
- List of Royal Air Force aircraft squadrons
- Pakistan Army Aviation Corps
