= 1 Regiment Army Air Corps =

1 Regiment Army Air Corps 1st Division Aviation (1964-69)
- Active: 1964 – present
- Country: United Kingdom
- Branch: British Army
- Type: Aviation
- Size: Regiment
- Part of: Aviation Reconnaissance Force
- Base: RNAS Yeovilton

Insignia
- Squadron Badge heraldry: The Regimental emblem is the Army Air Corps Cap Badge with the Roman numeral 'I' beneath.

1 Regiment Army Air Corps is a regiment of the Army Air Corps (AAC).

== History ==
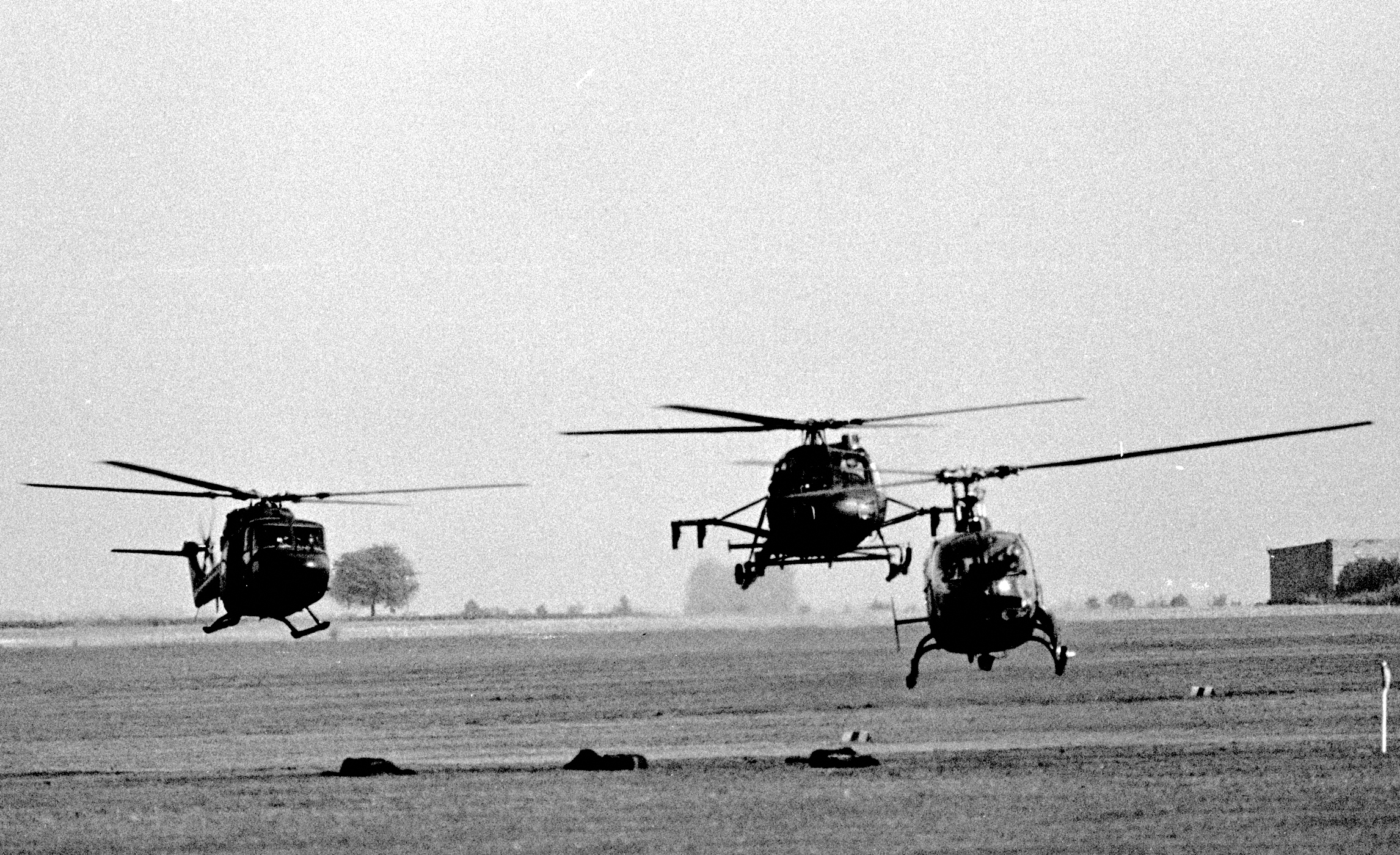
Westland Lynx, Westland Scout and Westland Gazelle helicopters (left to right) of 1 Regiment Army Air Corps in Hildesheim, West Germany in 1980.

- Detmold | 9, 17 & 26 Flights | 1964-1969
- Detmold | 651, 657 & 658 Squadrons | 1969-1971
- HQ at Detmold | 651 at Verden, 657 at Soltau & 658 Squadron at Minden | 1971-1976
- Hildesheim | 651 & 661 | 1977-1980
- Hildesheim | 651 & 661 | 1981-1983
- Hildesheim | HQ, 651, 652 & 661 | 1983-1990
- Hildesheim | HQ, 651, 652 & 661 | 1990-1994
- Gutersloh | 1994-2015
- RNAS Yeovilton | 2015-present

Until 1993 the regiment was based at Tofrek Barracks with 651 & 652 Squadrons using a mix of Westland Lynxs and Westland Gazelles. Previously, RHQ was located at Verden along with 651 Sqn AAC whilst 658 Sqn AAC was located at St Georges Barracks in Minden.

== Structure ==
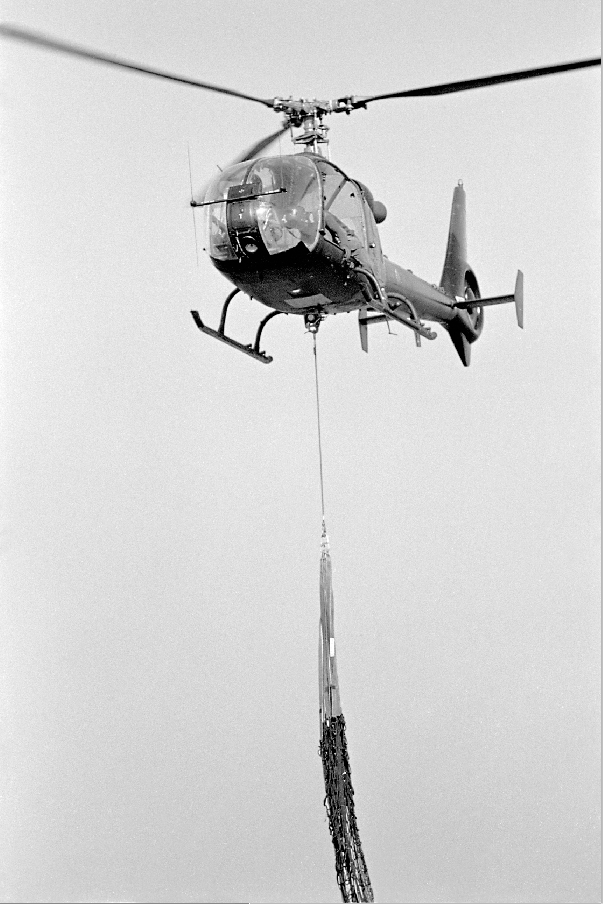
One Gazelle of 1 Reg in 1981.

The regiment consists of:

- No. 651 Squadron AAC
- No. 652 (Wildcat Fielding) Squadron AAC - Wildcat.
- No. 659 Squadron AAC. Previously part of 9 Regiment AAC.
- No. 661 Squadron AAC - Wildcat.

== See also ==
- List of Army Air Corps aircraft units
