= RNAS Yeovilton =

Royal Naval Air Station in Somerset, England

Royal Naval Air Station Yeovilton
- Yeovilton, Somerset in England
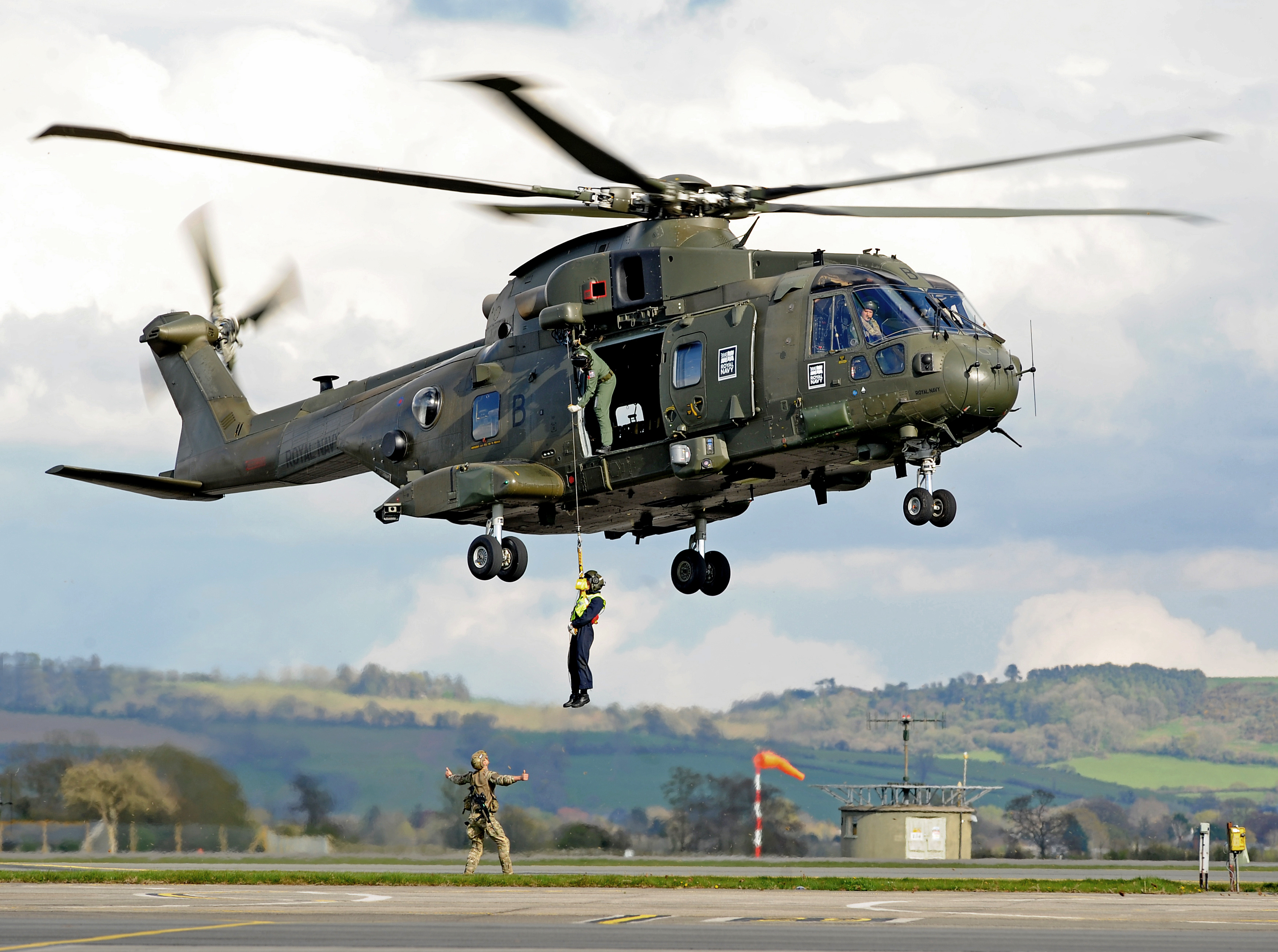
- An Merlin HC3 of 846 Naval Air Squadron at RNAS Yeovilton during 2016

- Badge of HMS Heron

Site information
- Type: Royal Naval Air Station
- Owner: Ministry of Defence
- Operator: Royal Navy
- Controlled by: Fleet Air Arm
- Open to the public: restricted
- Condition: operational
- Website: Official website

Location
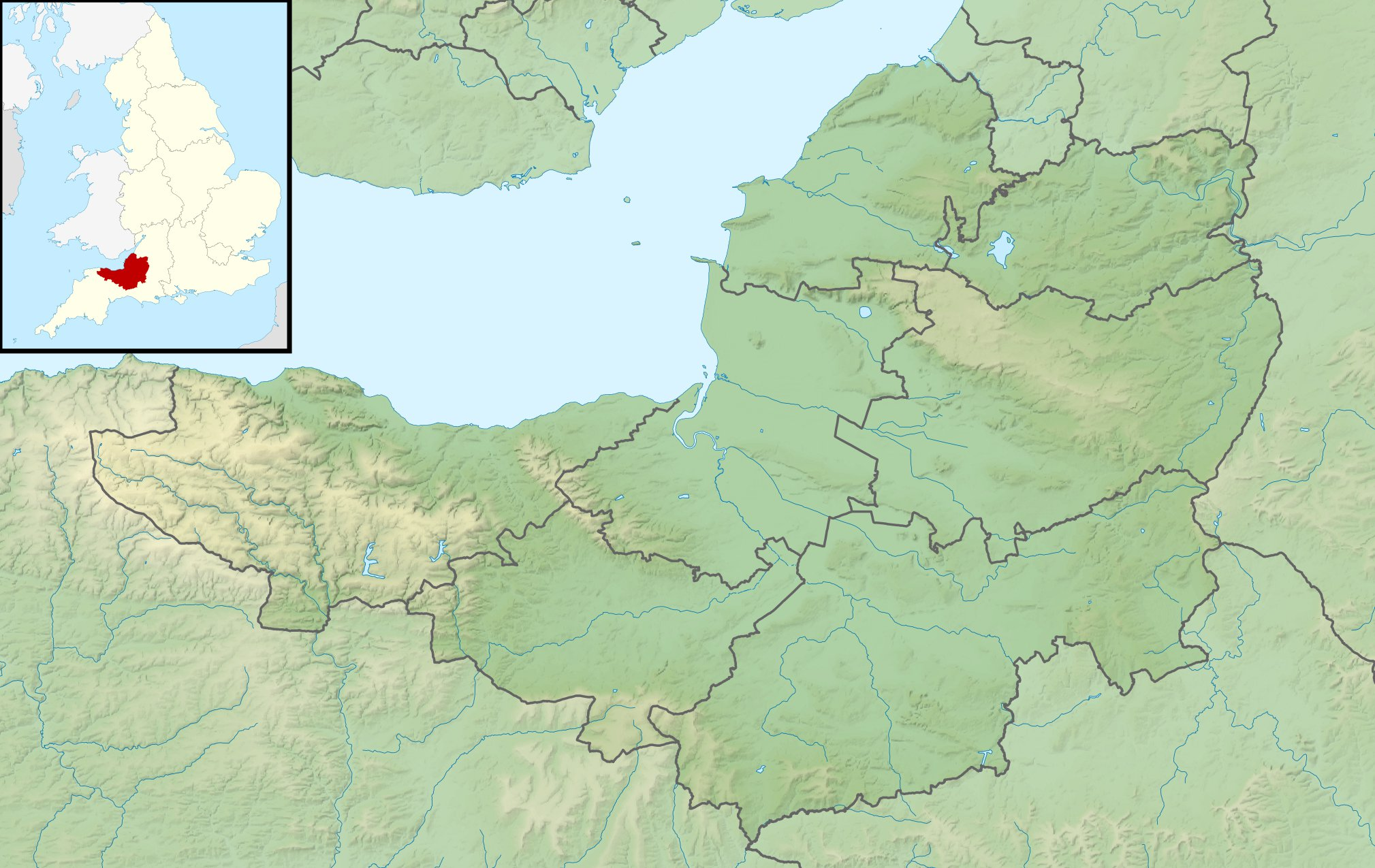
- Location in Somerset RNAS Yeovilton (the United Kingdom)
- Coordinates: 51°00′31″N 002°38′16″W
- Area: 452 hectares (1,120 acres)

Site history
- Built: 1939 – 1941
- In use: 1941 – present

Garrison information
- Current commander: Captain Stuart Crombie
- Occupants: Flying units: 815 Naval Air Squadron; 825 Naval Air Squadron; 845 Naval Air Squadron; 846 Naval Air Squadron; 847 Naval Air Squadron; No. 651 Squadron AAC; No. 652 Squadron AAC; No. 659 Squadron AAC; No. 661 Squadron AAC; 727 Naval Air Squadron; See Based units section for full list.

Airfield information
- Identifiers: IATA: YEO, ICAO: EGDY, WMO: 038530
- Elevation: 22.8 metres (75 ft) AMSL
Runways
Direction	Length and surface
08/26	2,292 metres (7,520 ft) concrete
04/22	1,463 metres (4,800 ft) concrete
- Source: UK Military Aeronautical Information Publication

Royal Naval Air Station Yeovilton, commonly referred to as RNAS Yeovilton, (IATA: YEO, ICAO: EGDY) (commissioned HMS Heron) is an airbase of the Royal Navy, sited a few miles north of Yeovil, in the English county of Somerset. It is one of two active Fleet Air Arm bases, the other being RNAS Culdrose. RNAS Yeovilton is currently home to the Royal Navy Wildcat HMA2, along with Army Air Corps Wildcat AH1 helicopters, as well as the Royal Navy's Commando Helicopter Force Merlin HCi3/4/4A and Wildcat AH1 helicopters.

The site consists of 1,000 acres (1.6 square miles; 4.0 square kilometres) of airfield sites, plus ranges and minor estates. Royal Naval Air Station (RNAS) Yeovilton is a large multi-role air station, with an annual budget of some £61 million. The airfield is also home to the Fleet Air Arm Museum, and until 2019 the station hosted an annual Air Day in July.

== History ==
In 1938, the potential of the land at Yeovilton for use as an airfield was spotted by Westland Aircraft's chief test pilot Harald Penrose, and an offer was made to buy the land. The owners, however, the Ecclesiastical Commissioners of the Church of England, refused to sell it. In 1939, the Admiralty Air Division commandeered 417 acres (169 hectares) of the land, and work began on the construction of the site. The runways being completed in 1941, despite problems with poor drainage. A main runway of 3,645 feet (1,111 metres) and three subsidiary runways each of 3,000 feet (914 metres) had been constructed.

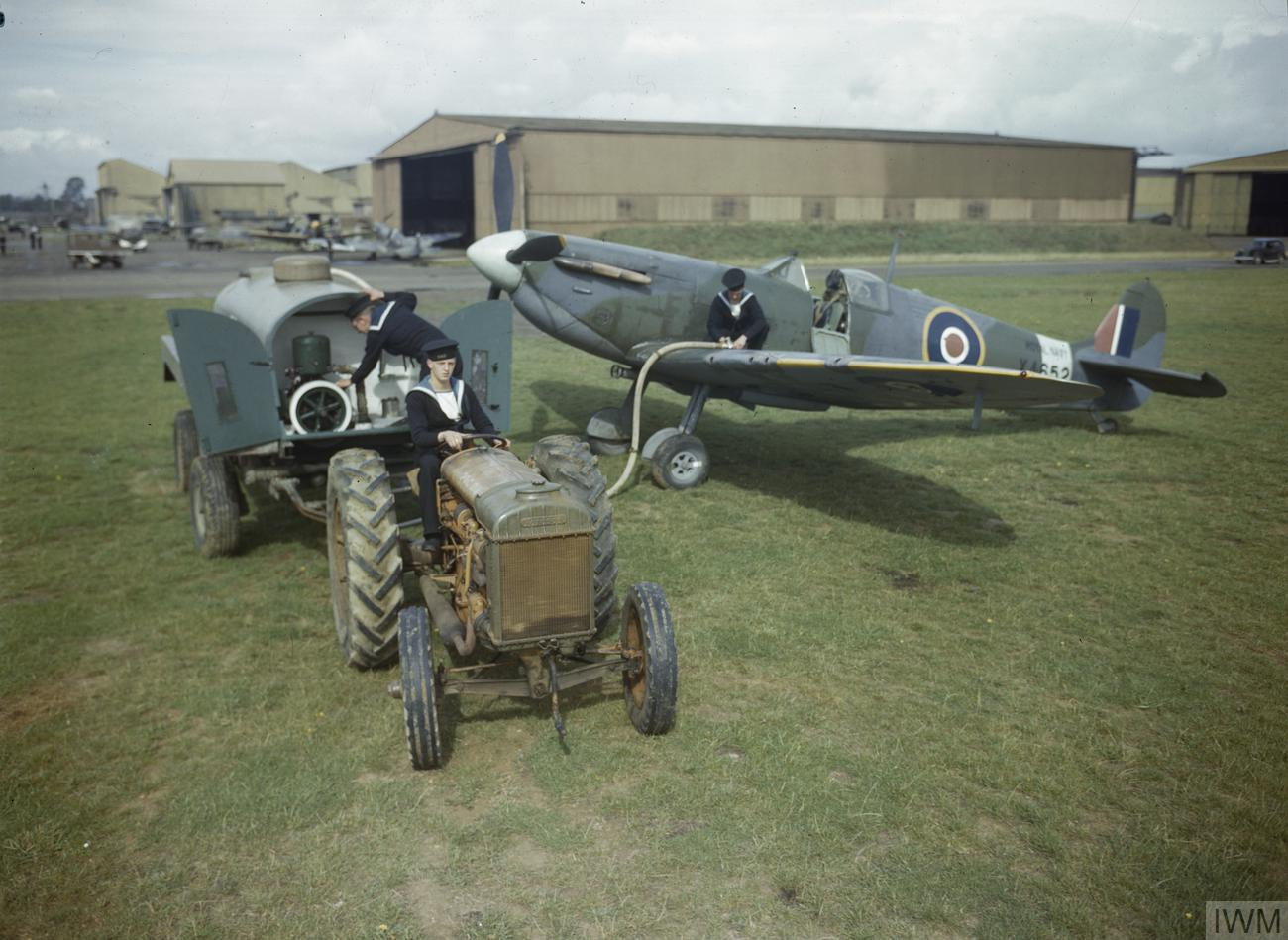
A Fleet Air Arm Supermarine Seafire being refuelled by a petrol bowser at Yeovilton in September 1943.

750 Naval Air Squadron was formed at RNAS Ford on 24 May 1939; 87 years ago, from the Royal Navy Observer School, but after Ford was bombed early in the war, it moved to RNAS Yeovilton. They were joined by 751 and 752 Squadrons, with the Naval Air Fighter School soon following. In addition, Westland Aircraft developed a repair facility at the site.

From 1940 on, the site was subjected to Luftwaffe bombing on several occasions. 794 Naval Air Squadron was the first to be formed at the base, and served to train other squadrons to practise aerial gunnery, and part of one of the runways was marked up as a flight deck to practise landing on an aircraft carrier. 827 Naval Air Squadron was also stationed at Yeovilton operating Fairey Albacores and later Barracudas starting in May 1943, becoming the first squadron to receive Barracudas in any substantial number. Several units which were preparing for embarkation were also stationed at the site during the Second World War. Because of pressure on space at the airfield, satellite sites were set up at Charlton Horethorne and Henstridge in 1942. A centre for Air Direction Radar was also established at Speckington Manor on the edge of the airfield.

After the end of the war, Yeovilton became one of the main demobilisation centres for the Royal Navy, with many of the men helping to refurbish the runways while they stayed at the base. In 1952, Yeovilton became the shore base for the fleets' all-weather fighters. The runways were further extended by Taylor Woodrow in 1952 and 1957 to cope with jet aircraft. In May 1953, it became the headquarters of Flag Officer Flying Training.

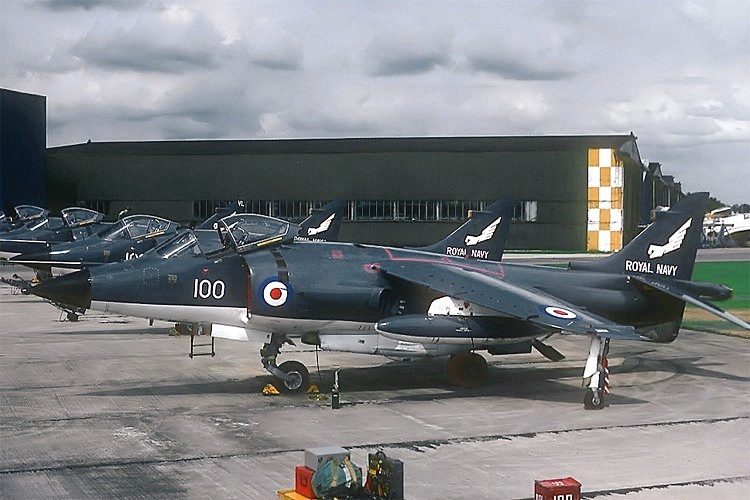
BAe Sea Harrier FRS1 of 899 Naval Air Squadron at Yeovilton Naval Air Station in 1982.

During the 1960s, further development work was undertaken, with the School of Fighter Direction returning to the site, and the Sea Venoms being replaced by the de Havilland Sea Vixens then in turn, by the Phantom FG1 as a carrier-borne fighter. The 1970s saw the Flag Officer, Naval Air Command (FONAC), transferring from RNAS Lee-on-Solent. Royal Navy fixed wing operations were phased out, and the Phantoms transferred to the Royal Air Force (RAF). The base remained as the home of the Commando Helicopter Squadrons, using the Wessex HU5 and later the Sea King HC4, and the fixed wing Fleet Requirements and Aircraft Direction Unit (FRADU), and became the main shore base for the Navy's fleet of Sea Harrier FRS1 (and later, FA2). A ski-jump (now removed) was installed to enable practice of ski-jump assisted take-offs.

In the mid 1980s, Defence Estates announced that many of the Royal Navy ratings married quarters at RNAS Yeovilton were surplus to requirements. As a result, The Welbeck Estate Group acquired in the nearby town of Ilchester two entire estates of apartments in Hermes Place and Lyster Close that were used by personnel at HMS Heron. (Note that while 'HMS' is typically a designation for a ship, the Royal Navy also used it for land-based establishments, known as a 'stone frigate'.) These were refurbished and sold to local buyers.

Since 1993, the Fleet Air Arm's Memorial Church has been the Church of St Bartholomew in Yeovilton.

800 Naval Air Squadron, 801 Naval Air Squadron, and 899 Naval Air Squadron (training) which operated the BAE Sea Harrier FA2 and T8 were disbanded in 2006. The replacement carrier-borne aircraft, the Lockheed Martin F-35 Lightning II, will be operated from RAF Marham, and was due to enter service in 2018, when it will equip the Queen Elizabeth-class aircraft carriers.

In July 2006, Sea King HC4 helicopters from RNAS Yeovilton were deployed to Cyprus on Operation Highbrow to assist with the evacuation of British citizens from Lebanon. Following the closure of RNAS Portland (HMS Osprey) in 1999, HMS Heron became the main shore base for the Lynx fleet.

In 2013, NATO's Joint Electronic Warfare Core Staff was established at Yeovilton. The organisation provides NATO with electronic warfare policy, advice and support.

=== Commando Helicopter Force – from Sea King to Merlin ===
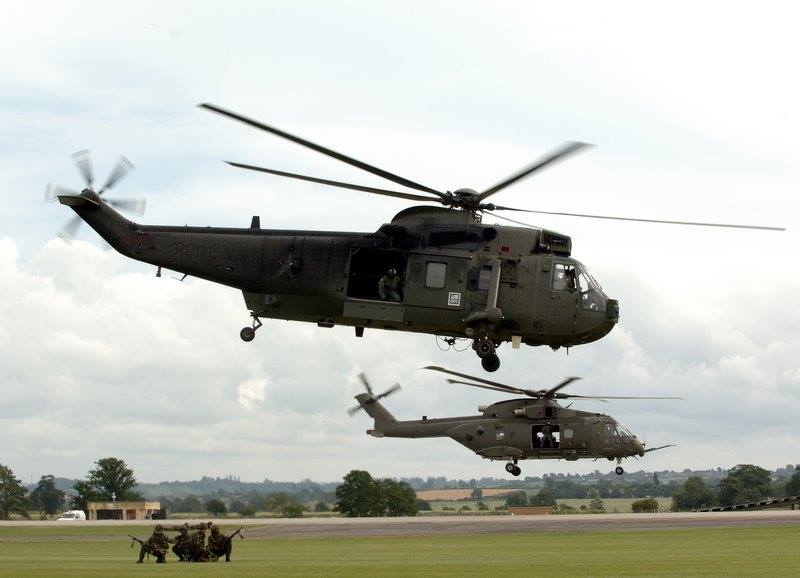
A Sea King HC4 (foreground) accompanied by a Merlin HC3 of the Commando Helicopter Force at RNAS Yeovilton.

The Strategic Defence and Security Review 2010 recommended that in order to replace the Navy's ageing Westland Sea King HC4's which formed the Commando Helicopter Force at Yeovilton, the RAF's AgustaWestland AW101 Merlin fleet should be transferred from the Royal Air Force to the Royal Navy's Fleet Air Arm. To gain experience of operating and maintaining the Merlin, Royal Navy aircrew and engineers were integrated into the Merlin Force at RAF Benson during 2012.

The Merlin fleet was officially handed over to the Navy during a ceremony at Benson on 30 September 2014. The ceremony marked the disbandment of the RAF's No. 78 Squadron, and its replacement at Benson with 846 Naval Air Squadron. During July 2015, 845 Naval Air Squadron reformed at Benson and replaced No. 28 Squadron of the RAF which also disbanded.

The Merlin arrived at Yeovilton when 846 NAS moved from Benson on 26 March 2015; 11 years ago. In May of that year, 848 Naval Air Squadron temporarily stood up with the remaining Sea King HC4 to cover the last remaining Sea King operations, before the Sea King HC4 was finally retired and the squadron decommissioned on 24 March 2016.

The last phase of the transition occurred when 845 NAS departed Benson for Yeovilton on 16 June 2016, bringing nearly 15 years of RAF Merlin operations to a close.

=== Wildcat and Project WINFRA ===
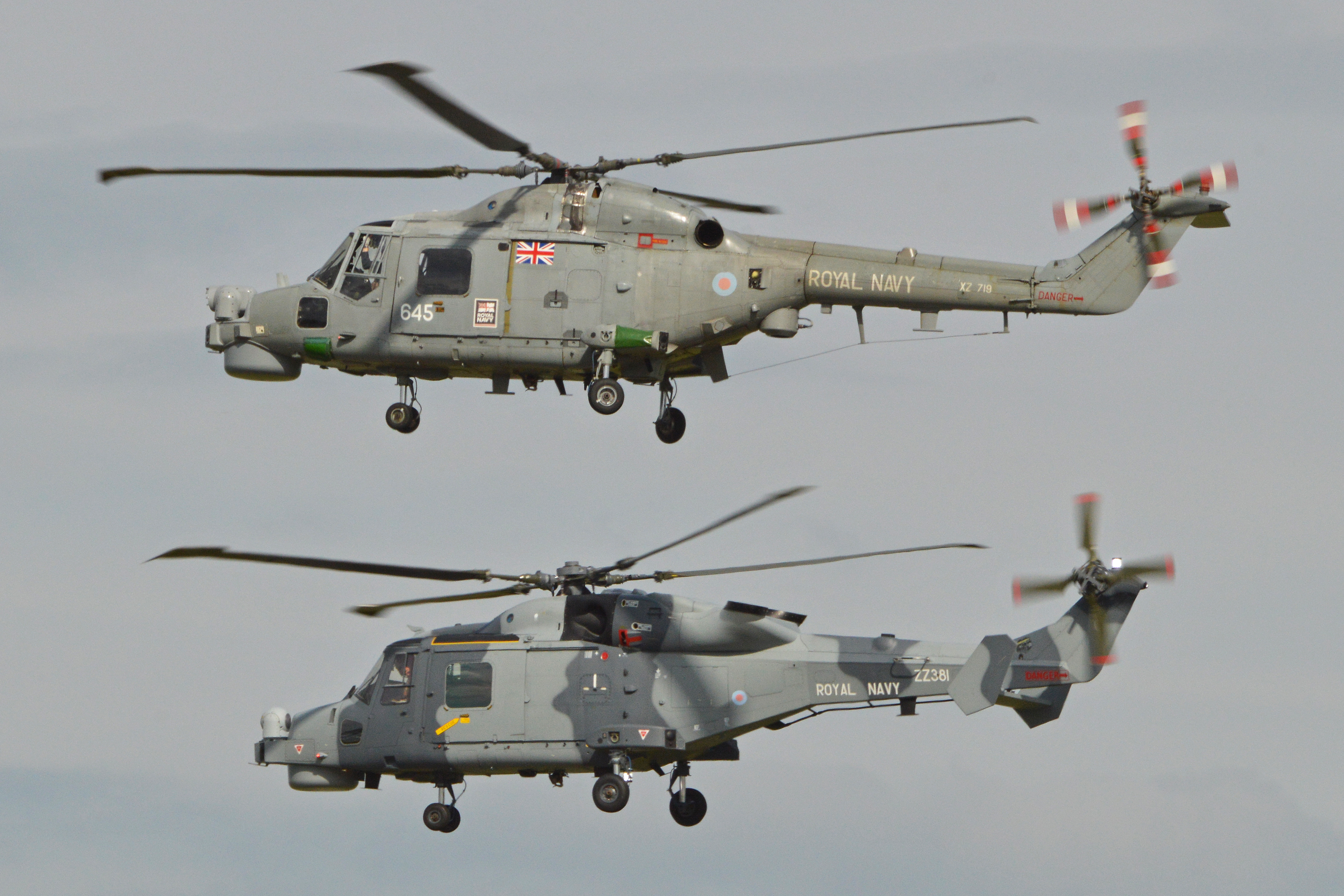
A Lynx HMA8RSU (top) operated by 815 Sqn and a Wildcat HMA2.

The AgustaWestland AW159 Wildcat HMA2 began replacing the Westland Lynx HMA8 when the first production aircraft arrived at Yeovilton in January 2013. Prior to that, in May 2009, 700W NAS was formed at Yeovilton as the Wildcat Fielding Squadron. The squadron disbanded in July 2014 when it was merged with 702 NAS to form 825 NAS, the first operational Wildcat unit. The final Wildcat HMA2 for the Royal Navy was delivered to 825 NAS in October 2016, bringing the total number of Royal Navy Wildcats to 28. The Lynx was retired in March 2017.

In October 2015, the consolidation of the Army Air Corps (AAC) for Army 2020 resulted in a large regular aviation regiment of Wildcat AH1 being based at RNAS Yeovilton. As such, all 62 UK military Wildcats on order will operate from Yeovilton. 1 Regiment AAC has returned from Gütersloh in Germany, and merged with 9 Regiment AAC from Dishforth. The current 652 (Wildcat Fielding) Squadron will become 1 Regiment's Wildcat Operational Conversion Unit. 1 Regiment will form part of the Army Air Corps' Aviation Reconnaissance Force along with 5 Regiment AAC.

In order to allow the Army Air Corps to locate their Wildcat helicopters and 750 personnel at Yeovilton, extensive redevelopment of the station began in 2014. Known as Project WINFRA, the work involves eight separate contracts worth a total of £150 million and was undertaken by Mott McDonald and Carillion. Building 710, a new three-storey squadron building for 846 Naval Air Squadron was completed in March 2015. The refurbishment of technical facilities and the construction of new quarter master's stores, vehicle garages and facilities, ancillary buildings, a cycle path and car parks was completed and handed to the AAC in November 2015. Building 661 is the new 1 Regiment headquarters, and provides accommodation for 659 Squadron and 661 Squadron.

In 2016, a new dental centre, a refurbished office building for 825 Naval Air Squadron, and a new build squadron building for 815 Naval Air Squadron were completed. By January 2017, a 500 capacity Senior Rates Mess, Physical and Recreational Training Centre including a gym, Multi Use Games Area and 4G sports pitches and the refurbishment of the medical centre had been completed. Three blocks of Single Living Accommodation which can accommodate 400 personnel were finished in March 2017. In total, the project has provided 508 new single living accommodation bed spaces, and 130 service families accommodation bed spaces.

=== Royal Navy Historic Flight ===
The Royal Navy Historic Flight (RNHF) was disbanded in March 2019, previously operating at RNAS Yeovilton since 1972. Following its disbandment, the remaining aircraft were donated to the Fly Navy Heritage Trust at an approximate value of £1,810,000. With the aircraft having now been transferred to the civilian register, displays are now funded from charity events run by the Fly Navy Heritage Trust.

== Operations ==
Yeovilton is home to the Royal Navy Wildcat Maritime Force (MWF), Royal Navy Commando Helicopter Force (CHF), the Army's Aviation Reconnaissance Force (ARF), and elements of the Royal Navy Fixed Wing Force. The station operates over 100 aircraft, and is staffed by around 1675 service and 2000 civilian personnel, including Ministry of Defence (MOD) employees and permanent contractors. Training of aircrew and engineers of resident aircraft types is also carried out at RNAS Yeovilton. It is also the location for the RN Fighter Controller School, training surface-based aircraft controllers.

Commando Helicopter Force has now returned to prioritising its main amphibious role in support of Royal Navy and Royal Marines operations, after focusing on more than a decade of service in land campaigns in Afghanistan and prior to that in Iraq.

During periods of busy flying training, pressure on the RNAS Yeovilton circuit is relieved by the use of nearby RNAS Merryfield.

727 Naval Air Squadron operate the Grob Tutor T1 in the grading and elementary flying training role.

== Air Day ==
Until 2019 the station held an annual air show, allowing public access to the airfield. It included both a flying and static aircraft display. The air day traditionally ended with the Commando Helicopter Force role demonstration, which saw a mixture of aircraft and land forces demonstrate a land assault delivered from the air.

== Based units ==
Flying and notable non-flying units based at RNAS Yeovilton.

=== Royal Navy ===
Fleet Air Arm

- Wildcat Maritime Force
  - 815 Naval Air Squadron – Wildcat HMA2
  - 825 Naval Air Squadron – Wildcat HMA2
- 727 Naval Air Squadron – Tutor T1
- Royal Naval Reserve Air Branch
- Royal Navy School of Fighter Control
- Royal Navy School of Aircraft Control
- Underwater Escape Training Unit
- Royal Navy Wildcat Demo Team

Joint Aviation Command – Fleet Air Arm

- Commando Helicopter Force (Fleet Air Arm / Royal Marines)
  - 845 Naval Air Squadron – Commando Merlin HC4/4A
  - 846 Naval Air Squadron – Commando Merlin HC4/HC3i
  - 847 Naval Air Squadron – Commando Wildcat AH1

=== British Army ===
Joint Aviation Command – Army Air Corps

- 1st Aviation Brigade
  - 1 Regiment
    - 652 Squadron – Wildcat AH1
    - 659 Squadron – Wildcat AH1
    - 661 Squadron – Wildcat AH1

Royal Electrical and Mechanical Engineers

- 7 Aviation Support Battalion
  - 73 Aviation Company (Wildcat Support)

=== NATO ===
Supreme Headquarters Allied Powers Europe (SHAPE)

- Joint Electronic Warfare Core Staff (JEWCS)

== Future ==
=== Merlin Life Sustainment Programme (MLSP) ===
The Merlin HC3/3A fleet is currently undergoing an upgrade to HC4 and HC4A, to ensure the aircraft are fully capable of deploying in a maritime / amphibious role. The differences between the remaining HC3 and (former Denmark-bound) HC3A will be almost eliminated in the HC4/4A upgrade, known as the Merlin Life Sustainment Programme (MLSP). This will remove conversion training requirements, as both the HC4 and HC4A variants can be operated under the same training.

Prior to the upgrade, seven of the airframes have been upgraded to the 'interim HC3' (HC3i), and are serving with 846 NAS. These aircraft are receiving the full upgrade after the remaining aircraft were upgraded to the HC4 and HC4A. The upgraded and ship-optimised Merlin HC4 and HC4A aircraft are painted in Royal Navy grey, unlike their green 'Junglie' Sea King HC4 and Merlin HC3 predecessors. Full Operating Capability of the HC4 was delivered in December 2020, with all airframes expected to be delivered by 2023.

== Commanding Officers, Navy ==
Included:

- Captain Harry S. Murray-Smith: March 1940 – May 1942
- Captain Mervyn S. Thomas: May 1942 – August 1943
- Captain E.M. Conolly Abel Smith: August 1943 – May 1944
- Captain Charles L. Keighley Peach: May 1944 – August 1945
- Captain John B. Heath: August 1945 – February 1947
- Captain W. Kaye Edden: February 1947 – May 1949
- Captain Walter A. Adair: May 1949 – January 1951
- Captain R.T. Paul: January 1951 – May 1952
- Captain Eric V. St.G. Morgan: May 1952 – September 1953
- Captain Alan F. Black: September 1953 – July 1955
- Captain Henry J.F. Lane: July 1955 – January 1958
- Captain Desmond B.Law: January 1958 – January 1960
- Captain William C. Simpson: January 1960 – January 1962
- Captain Rodney H.P. Carver: January 1962 – February 1964
- Captain Terence G.V. Percy: February 1964 – July 1966
- Captain George C. Baldwin: July 1966 – May 1968
- Captain Cyril J. Cunningham: May 1968 – May 1970
- Captain Alfred R. Rawbone: May 1970 – February 1972
- Captain Keith A. Leppard: February 1972 – February 1974
- Captain Joseph J. Phillips: February 1974 – November 1975
- Captain Harold J. Abraham: November 1975 – October 1977
- Captain Brian J. Williams: October 1977 – August 1980
- Captain Michael J.F. Rawlinson: August 1980 – February 1982
- Captain Peter J. Williams: February 1982 – January 1984
- Captain Robert J. Northard: January 1984 – February 1986
- Captain Rodney P. Warwick: February 1986 – February 1988
- Captain Colin L. MacGregor: February 1988 – 1989
- Captain Robin F. Shercliffe: 1989 – January 1992
- Captain Ian D. MacKenzie: January 1992 – August 1993
- Captain Iain R. Henderson: August 1993 – 1996
- Commodore Scott Lidbetter: 1996 – November 1998
- Commodore Richard J. Clapp: November 1998 – May 2001
- Commodore William M. Covington: May 2001 – July 2003
- Commodore Alan R.C. Bennett: July 2003 – November 2005
- Commodore Christopher L. Palmer: November 2005 – July 2009
- Brigadier Mark Noble RM: August 2009 – June 2011
- Commodore Paul Chivers: June 2011 – November 2012
- Commodore Jock Alexander: December 2012 – September 2015
- Commodore Jon Pentreath: September 2015 – April 2017
- Commodore Nick Tindal: April 2017 – July 2020
- Commodore Niall Griffin: July 2020– August 2023
- Captain Duncan Thomas: August 2023 - March 2026
- Captain Stuart Crombie: March 2026 - Present

== See also ==
- AgustaWestland aircraft
- Fleet Air Arm Museum
- List of air stations of the Royal Navy
- List of airfields of the Army Air Corps (United Kingdom)
