= No. 661 Squadron AAC =

Flying squadron of the British Army's Army Air Corps

No. 661 Squadron AAC No. 661 Squadron RAuxAF No. 661 Squadron RAF
- Active: 31 August 1943 – 31 October 1945 (RAF); 1 May 1949 – 10 March 1957 (RAxuAF); 1 November 1978 – present
- Country: United Kingdom
- Branch: (United Kingdom) British Army
- Part of: 1 Regiment Army Air Corps
- Garrison/HQ: RNAS Yeovilton (HMS Heron)

Aircraft flown
- Helicopter: AgustaWestland Wildcat AH1

No. 661 Squadron AAC is a squadron of the British Army's Army Air Corps (AAC). It was formerly No. 661 Squadron, a Royal Air Force air observation post squadron associated with the Canadian 1st Army and later part of the Royal Auxiliary Air Force. Numbers 651 to 663 Squadrons of the RAF were air observation post units working closely with British Army units in artillery spotting and liaison. A further three of these squadrons, 664–666, were manned with Canadian personnel. Their duties and squadron numbers were transferred to the Army with the formation of the Army Air Corps on 1 September 1957.

== Royal Air Force ==
No. 661 Squadron was formed at RAF Old Sarum on 31 August 1943 with the Taylorcraft Auster III and in March 1944 the Auster IV. The squadron role was to support the Canadian 1st Army and in July 1944 it moved to France. Fighting in the break-out from Normandy it followed the Canadians across the low countries and into Germany. The squadron disbanded at Ghent, Belgium on 31 October 1945.

Its motto was: Latin Designo oculis ad caedem ("With my eyes i designate for slaughter"), and its identification symbol was: A grenade enfiled by a compass ring. It used the following identification symbols: OE (Aug 1944 – Oct 1945) ROA (Feb 1949 – Apr 1951)

After the war the Air Observation Squadrons were reformed and No. 661 Squadron Royal Auxiliary Air Force was as such formed at RAF Kenley on 1 May 1949, consisting of five flights -nos. 1957, 1958, 1959, 1960 and 1961 (Reserve) AOP Flights-, to provide support to the Army in the south London and Surrey area until it was disbanded on 10 March 1957 at RAF Henlow.

No. 1957 Reserve Air Observation Post Flight was formed within 662 Squadron along with No. 1958 Reserve Air Observation Post Flight, No. 1959 Reserve Air Observation Post Flight, No. 1960 Reserve Air Observation Post Flight & No. 1961 Reserve Air Observation Post Flight.

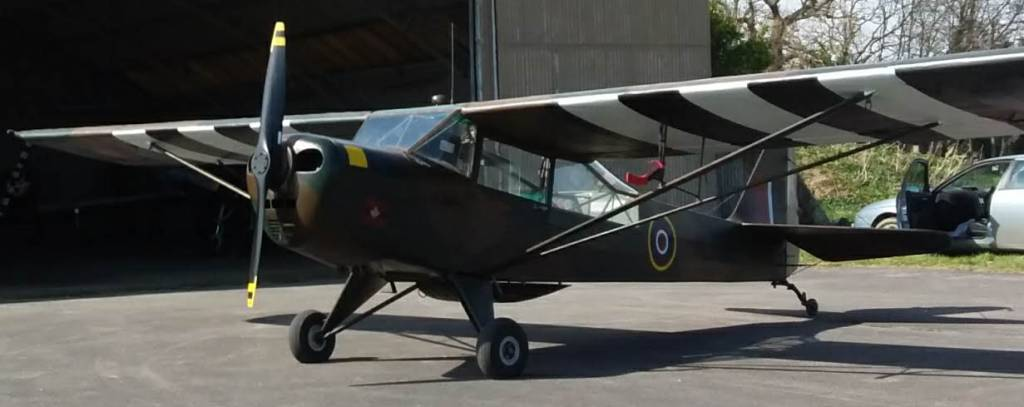
Ex-661 Squadron Auster AOP IV NJ695.

Aircraft operated by No. 661 Squadron RAF
From	To	Aircraft	Variant
August 1943	April 1944	Taylorcraft Auster	III
March 1944	October 1945	Auster	IV
November 1944	October 1945	Auster	V

Aircraft operated by No. 661 Squadron RAuxAF
From	To	Aircraft	Variant
Jul 1949	February 1950	Auster	IV
May 1949	October 1951	Auster	V
May 1949	February 1957	Auster	AOP.6

== Surviving aircraft ==
Three known 661 Squadron aircraft survive in airworthy condition.

Serial	Geographic location	Institutional location	History	Photo
NJ695	Lee on the Solent, Hampshire, UK	The Historic Aircraft Hangar, "Bellman 4", Solent Airport, EGHF	Auster Mk.IV, built in 1943 and deployed to France in July 1944. It was operated by 661 squadron in Europe until the squadron was disbanded. Demobbed and civilianised by Taylorcraft England, it was sold to a flying school in East Anglia in 1948, then to a French parachuting club in 1958, before returning to the UK in 1973. Currently in flyable condition, restoration to full airworthiness is planned to be completed in 2024.	NJ695
TW384	Rakovník, Czechia	Rakovnik Airport, LKRK	Auster Mk.V, C/N 1753, To 20 MU Aston Down 31.8.45. To CS(A) at A&AEE, Boscombe Down 12.9.46 (to replace TW513 for photography of smokescreens & communications duties). To 20 MU Aston Down 13.7.48. To 1960 Flt/661 Squadron, Kenley 19.5.49; coded ‘RCE-D’. To 19 MU St Athan 20.9.51. Sold 1953. Operated by Channel Airways from 1954 to 1974 as G-ANHZ. Sold to Switzerland in 1995 as HB-EZJ and fully restored in Switzerland to original condition. Since 2022 OK-BTA, privately owned by Jiri Hruska.	
MS980	Niederöblarn, Austria	Niederöblarn Airport	Auster MK.V built in February 1944 as MS980, issued to 661 Squadron "C Flight" on 15.06.1944; Transferred to 652 Squadron on 12.4.1945, released to 663 Squadron Royal Auxiliary Air Force on 11.8.1949; Put in storage surplus 3.3.1954; civilized as G-ANGW and sold to the Austrian Flying Club "Fliegerclub Wien Aspern" registered since then in Austria as OE-AAT. Was sold to Fliegerclub Fürstenfeld in 1964, removed from flying in 1984 and put in long term storage until 2004. Now restored to original authentic RAF WWII D Day factory config including camouflage between 2006-2012 by Erich and Matthias Lemmerer; Aircraft based in Austria;	MS980 OE-AAT

=== Army Air Corps ===
The squadron was reformed from the original RAF squadron on 1 November 1978 while in Germany.

== See also ==
- List of Army Air Corps aircraft units
- List of Royal Air Force aircraft squadrons
