= Beagle Terrier =

British monoplane

A.61 Terrier
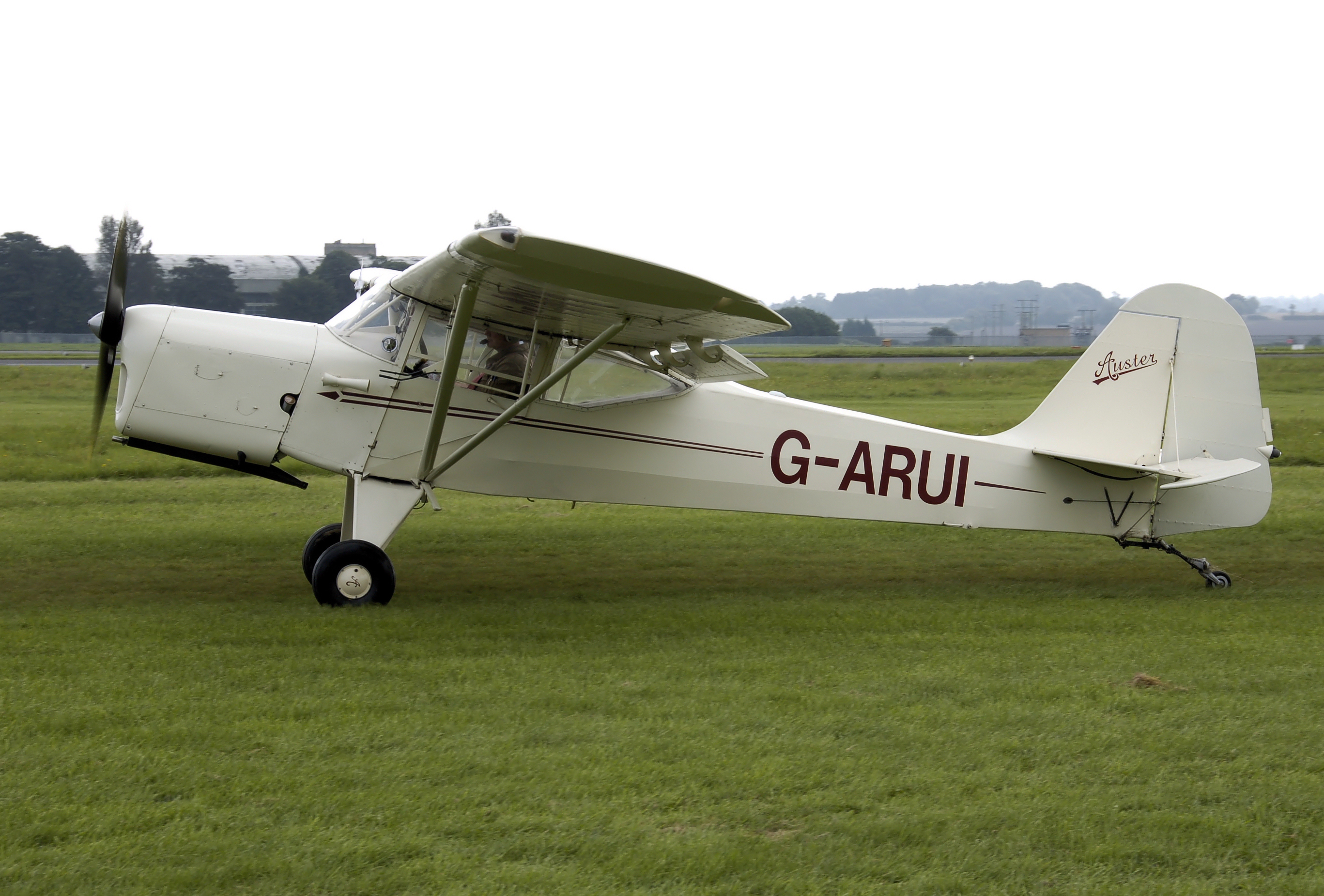
- Auster A.61 Terrier

General information
- Type: Light Transport
- Manufacturer: Beagle Aircraft Limited
- Status: in active service
- Primary user: Private pilot owners

History
- First flight: 1961
- Developed from: Taylorcraft Auster

The Beagle A.61 Terrier is a British single-engined monoplane built by Beagle Aircraft.

== Development ==
The Auster Aircraft Company purchased a large number of former British Army Auster aircraft during the late 1950s. These were Auster AOP.6, T.7 and T.10 aircraft which were updated and modified with de Havilland Gipsy Major 10-1-1 engines. Initially two versions were offered for sale in the civilian market from 1960:

- Auster 6A Tugmaster – a utility and glider towing aircraft
- Auster 6B – a three-seat luxury version. When the company became part of Beagle Aircraft in 1960, the Auster 6B was renamed the Beagle A.61 Terrier 1.

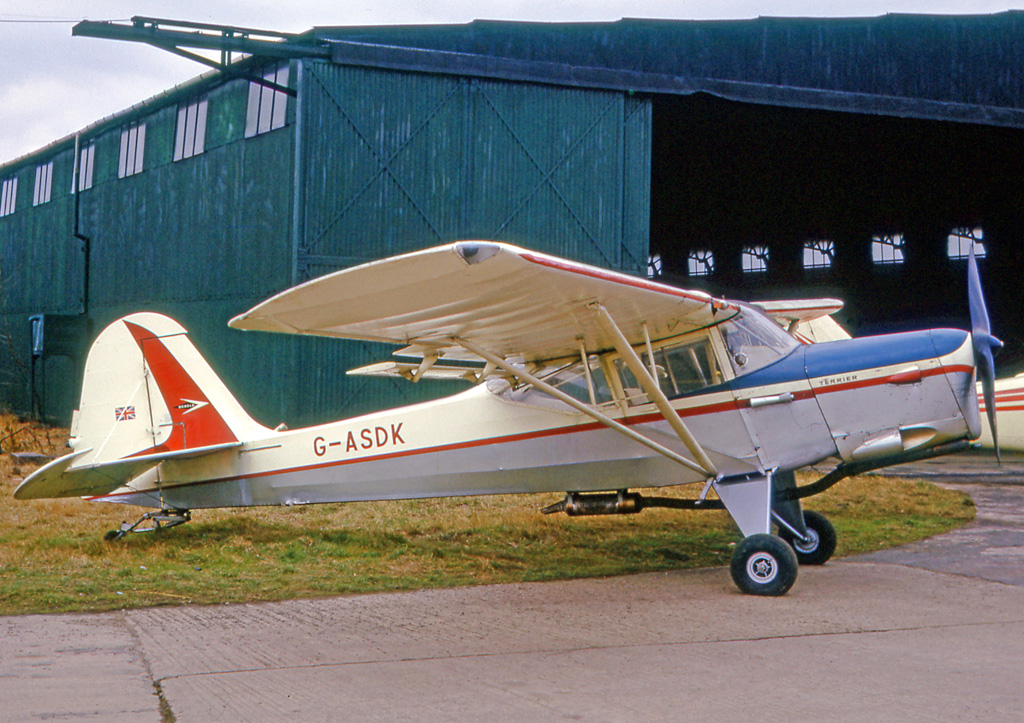
Terrier 2 in 1965 wearing the factory applied colour scheme and fitted with a long silencer

In 1962 the Beagle A.61 Terrier 2 was introduced with a greater span tailplane, wheel spats and a metal propeller.

The Terrier was not an economic success for the manufacturer as it was found that more man-hours were spent on rebuilding each aircraft after its military use than were spent in building the new aircraft for the Army. It was also out-dated as, by 1961, most competing manufacturers were introducing new designs which were all-metal, with tricycle undercarriages and powered by more modern engines such as Lycoming or Continental (e.g. the Cessna 150 and the Piper Cherokee). However the Terrier has found many adherents among vintage light aircraft owner pilots. Examples of the type were purchased by owners in the United Kingdom, Eire, Germany, Netherlands, New Zealand and Sweden. 23 Terriers were registered in the UK in 2013.

== Production ==
- Terrier 1

Twenty Five Terrier 1 conversions were built. The first conversion flew 7 April 1961 from Rearsby.

- Terrier 2

Forty Eight Terrier 2 conversions were completed at Rearsby, plus one new build, constructed from spares in 1963.

- Terrier 3

One Terrier 3 powered by a 160 hp Lycoming O-320-B2B engine was essentially complete at Rearsby when Terrier production was stopped in 1966. In 1967, an incomplete Terrier 2 was modified to this standard by British European Airways engineering apprentices and registered G-AVYK.

== Specifications (Terrier 2) ==
Data from British Civil Aircraft since 1919

General characteristics

- Crew: 1
- Capacity: 2 passengers
- Length: 23 ft 3 in (7.09 m)
- Wingspan: 36 ft 0 in (10.97 m)
- Height: 8 ft 11 in (2.72 m)
- Wing area: 184 sq ft (17.1 m^{2})
- Aspect ratio: 7:1
- Airfoil: NACA 23012
- Empty weight: 1,600 lb (726 kg)
- Gross weight: 2,400 lb (1,089 kg)
- Fuel capacity: 23 imp gal (28 US gal; 100 L)
- Powerplant: 1 × de Havilland Gipsy Major 10 Mk. 1.1 4-cylinder inline piston, 145 hp (108 kW)

Performance

- Maximum speed: 120 mph (190 km/h, 100 kn)
- Cruise speed: 107 mph (172 km/h, 93 kn)
- Stall speed: 44 mph (71 km/h, 38 kn) (flaps down)
- Range: 320 mi (510 km, 280 nmi)
- Service ceiling: 11,500 ft (3,500 m)
- Rate of climb: 530 ft/min (2.7 m/s)
- Takeoff distance to 50 ft (15 m): 1,500 ft (457 m)
- Landing distance from 50 ft (15 m): 1,440 ft (439 m)

== See also ==
Related development

- Taylorcraft Auster

== Bibliography ==
- N.H. Ellison and R.O. MacDemitria, Auster Aircraft Production list, 1966, Air-Britain (Historians) Ltd, ISBN none
- Jackson, A. J. (1973). British Civil Aircraft since 1919 Volume 1 (2nd ed.). London: Putnam & Co. pp. 190–191. ISBN 0-370-10006-9.
- Taylor, John W. R. (1962). Jane's All The World's Aircraft 1962–63. London: Sampson Low, Marston & Company.
