= 9 Regiment Army Air Corps =

- Active: 1971–1982; 1989–2016; 2018–present
- Country: United Kingdom
- Branch: British Army; Royal Air Force
- Type: Training regiment
- Role: Advanced helicopter training
- Part of: Army Air Corps; No. 1 Flying Training School RAF
- Station: RAF Shawbury
- Aircraft: Juno HT1

Commanders
- Honorary Colonel: Major Tim Peake

9 Regiment Army Air Corps is a regiment of the Army Air Corps (AAC), that currently serves as the Battlefield Helicopter Wing of No. 1 Flying Training School RAF (formerly the Defence Helicopter Flying School).

== History ==
Between 1971 and 1989 the Headquarters of the regiment was based at Hobart Barracks, Detmold, Germany until moving to Dishforth. Initially between 1971 and 1976 both 655 and 669 Squadrons were part of the regiment at Detmold. In 1977 655 was replaced by 659 Squadron and the squadrons stayed together until 1982, when 654 Squadron joined.

The Regiment was declared combat ready with the AgustaWestland Apache AH.1 during May 2005.

In 2016, the regiment merged with 1 Regiment Army Air Corps, based at RNAS Yeovilton.

In April 2018, the regiment was re-formed and tasked with role of the Battlefield Helicopter Wing of the re-shaped Defence Helicopter Flying School at RAF Shawbury under the UK MFTS contract. It thus became a Tri-Service organisation under No. 22 Group RAF and comprising a squadron from both the Army Air Corps, and the RAF. It conducts Advanced Rotary Wing Training for Pilots and Crewmen who have completed Basic Rotary Wing Training in the sister wing, 2 Maritime Air Wing. Together, both of these units make up No. 1 Flying Training School RAF, the former DHFS.

== Structure ==
The regiment consists of:

- No. 60 Squadron RAF, at RAF Shawbury, (Airbus Juno HT1)
- No. 670 Squadron, Army Air Corps, at RAF Shawbury, (Airbus Juno HT1)

== Heritage ==
The regimental emblem is the Army Air Corps cap badge with the Roman numeral 'IX' beneath.

== See also ==
- List of Army Air Corps aircraft units
