= Article XV squadrons =

World War II air force squadrons

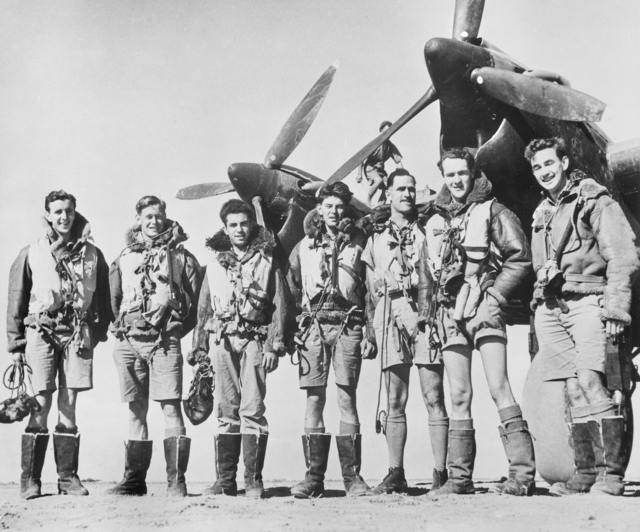
A bomber crew from No. 462 Squadron RAAF in September 1942. While the squadron was officially a unit of the Royal Australian Air Force, only the man third from the right was Australian; the others are from Britain, Newfoundland and New Zealand

Article XV squadrons were Australian, Canadian, and New Zealand air force squadrons formed from graduates of the British Commonwealth Air Training Plan (1939) during World War II.

These units complemented another feature of the BCATP, under which personnel from the Royal Air Force (RAF), Royal Australian Air Force (RAAF), Royal Canadian Air Force (RCAF) and Royal New Zealand Air Force (RNZAF) were placed in a common pool, and assigned to Article XV and RAF squadrons – in Europe, the Mediterranean Theatre, Africa and South-East Asia – according to operational needs.

The RAAF, RCAF and RNZAF also formed non-Article XV squadrons, which performed home defence duties and saw active service in various parts of the Pacific Theatre.

== History ==
Negotiations regarding the BCATP, between the four governments concerned, took place in Ottawa, Ontario, Canada during late 1939. The Air Training Agreement (sometimes known as the "Ottawa Agreement" or the "Riverdale Agreement", after the UK representative at the negotiations, Lord Riverdale) was officially signed on 17 December 1939.

Under Article XV of the Agreement, graduates from Dominion air forces were to be assigned to squadrons either formed by their own air forces, or with a specific national designation, under the operational control of a local air force, in most cases the RAF. These became known as "Article XV squadrons." In addition, Articles XVI and XVII stipulated that the UK government would be responsible for the pay and entitlements of aircrews trained under the BCATP. Nevertheless, these personnel and any squadrons formed for service with the RAF, under Article XV, would belong to the three Dominion air forces. This was largely an initiative of the Canadian Prime Minister, Mackenzie King, during the negotiations with Riverdale.

During the war, 44 Canadian, 17 Australian and six New Zealand Article XV squadrons were formed. In practice – and technically in contravention of Article XV – most personnel from Dominion air forces, while they were under RAF operational control, were assigned to British units. This was generally due to practical staffing considerations. Similarly, many of the Article XV squadrons contained few airmen from their nominal air force when they were first formed. However, by the end of the war this had generally been rectified. Canada made a greater insistence on its airmen going specifically to RCAF operational units overseas, ensuring that the identity of its national squadrons was preserved. In January 1943 Canada was also able to form their bomber squadrons into a separate wholly RCAF formation within Bomber Command (No. 6 Group), commanded by a Canadian air vice-marshal. This was something the Australians and New Zealanders did not achieve.

Several other RAAF and RCAF units, which were not covered by Article XV, were also under RAF operational control (see below). Initially, there was no cross-posting of personnel to or from these squadrons by the RAF and other Dominion air forces, although this requirement was relaxed later in the war.

The remaining dominion, South Africa, was not a signatory to the BCATP and the South African Air Force (SAAF) did not form any Article XV squadrons. However, South Africa provided training facilities for some Article XV personnel, and many SAAF units took part in the East African, North African and Italian Campaigns. Furthermore, as the war progressed, personnel from other Dominion air forces were transferred to SAAF units and vice versa, in North Africa, the Mediterranean and Italy.

Southern Rhodesia (later Zimbabwe) was not technically a Dominion and was therefore not a signatory to the BCATP, although aircrews from other dominions were trained there. In 1940, the small Southern Rhodesia Air Force was designated No. 237 (Rhodesia) Squadron RAF. Two other RAF squadrons, No. 44 (Rhodesia) Squadron RAF and No. 266 (Rhodesia) Squadron RAF were also formed; both had significant numbers of Rhodesian personnel.

No. 75 (New Zealand) Squadron RAF had a status similar to the Rhodesian squadrons, and was not officially an Article XV squadron, although it was staffed primarily by RNZAF aircrew during the war and was officially transferred to the RNZAF in late 1945.

While RAF units were not covered by Article XV, four British squadrons had a similar status: they were stationed in Australia, under RAAF operational control, for part of the war. These units were: No. 54 Squadron RAF, No. 548 Squadron RAF, No. 549 Squadron RAF and No. 618 Squadron RAF.

== List of Article XV squadrons ==
=== Royal Canadian Air Force ===
- 400 (City of Toronto)
- 401 (Ram)
- 402 (City of Winnipeg)
- 403 (Wolf)
- 404 (Buffalo)
- 405 (Vancouver)
- 406 (Lynx)
- 407 (Demon)
- 408 (Goose)
- 409 (Nighthawk)
- 410 (Cougar)
- 411 (Grizzly Bear)
- 412 (Falcon)
- 413 (Tusker)
- 414 (Sarnia Imperials)
- 415 (Swordfish)
- 416 (City of Oshawa)
- 417 (City of Windsor)
- 418 (City of Edmonton)
- 419 (Moose)
- 420 (Snowy Owl)
- 421 (Red Indian)
- 422 (Flying Yachtsman)
- 423 (Bald Eagle)
- 424 (Tiger)
- 425 (Alouette)
- 426 (Thunderbird)
- 427 (Lion)
- 428 (Ghost)
- 429 (Bison)
- 430 (City of Sudbury)
- 431 (Iroquois)
- 432 (Leaside)
- 433 (Porcupine)
- 434 (Bluenose)
- 435 (Chinthe)
- 436 (Elephant)
- 437 (Husky)
- 438 (Wildcat)
- 439 (Westmount)
- 440 (City of Ottawa and Beaver)
- 441 (Silver Fox)
- 442 (Caribou)
- 443 (Hornet)

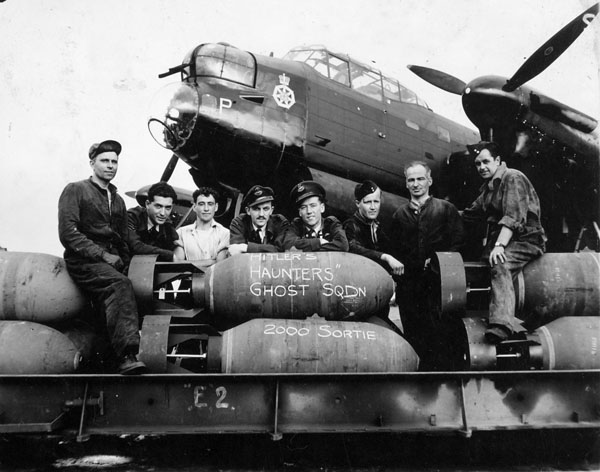
Aircrew and groundcrew of a No. 428 Squadron RCAF Lancaster bomber.

A further four squadrons served outside North America during the war: No. 162 Squadron RCAF, which in 1944 was transferred from RCAF Eastern Air Command to RAF Coastal Command, from airfields in Iceland and Scotland and; three air observation post (AOP; artillery spotter) squadrons, composed of RCAF and Royal Canadian Artillery personnel: No. 664 Squadron RCAF; No. 665 Squadron RCAF and; No. 666 Squadron RCAF.

Some non-Article XV RCAF squadrons were re-numbered to become Article XV squadrons when they were transferred from North America to Europe. These were:

- No. 1 Squadron (later 401 Sqn), which fought in the Battle of Britain;
- No. 110 Squadron (later 400 Sqn), No. 112 Squadron (later 402 Sqn), and No. 123 Squadron (later 439 Sqn), which were Army Co-operation Squadrons while still in Canada;
- No. 111 Squadron (later 440 Sqn) and No. 14 Squadron (later 442 Sqn), who had been part of RCAF Western Air Command and had already seen action in the Aleutian Islands Campaign; and
- No. 118 Squadron (later 438 Sqn), No. 125 Squadron (later 441 Sqn) and No. 127 Squadron (later 443 Sqn), who had been part of Eastern Air Command.

However, most of the RCAF Article XV squadrons were formed overseas. Domestically the Home War Establishment of the RCAF, which consisted of Eastern and Western Air Commands, had at its peak 37 squadrons.

Following the end of the war and termination of the BCATP, the RCAF squadrons covered by Article XV retained their numbers. Furthermore, home-based, non-Article XV squadrons were renumbered in the 400-series. During an expansion of the RCAF in the early 1950s the numbers 444 to 449 were used, and – following the 1968 unification of the three service branches – a Canadian Army helicopter squadron became known as 450 Squadron (a name that overlapped the RAAF numbers).

=== Royal Australian Air Force ===
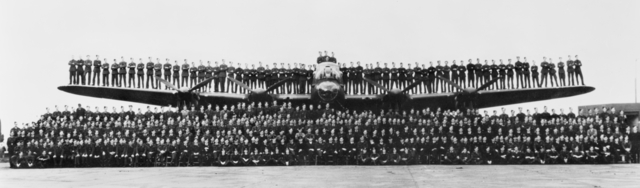
Members of No. 460 Squadron posing with the Lancaster bomber G for George at RAF Binbrook in August 1943

Australia formed 17 Article XV squadrons, out of a total of 79 RAAF squadrons, during World War II. While 18 squadrons had been originally planned for service with the RAF, No. 465 Squadron was never formed.

The remaining 57 RAAF squadrons served under the operational control of the RAAF or United States Army Air Forces, in the South West Pacific Theatre during World War II.

When some Article XV squadrons and RAF units were transferred to RAAF operational control, from 1943 onwards, they retained their original numbers.

All of the Australian Article XV squadrons were disbanded after the end of the war. Since 2005 four of the squadrons have been re-formed by re-designating RAAF intelligence and air traffic control units.

The RAAF Article XV squadrons were:

- No. 450 Squadron RAAF
- No. 451 Squadron RAAF
- No. 452 Squadron RAAF
- No. 453 Squadron RAAF
- No. 454 Squadron RAAF
- No. 455 Squadron RAAF
- No. 456 Squadron RAAF
- No. 457 Squadron RAAF
- No. 458 Squadron RAAF
- No. 459 Squadron RAAF
- No. 460 Squadron RAAF
- No. 461 Squadron RAAF
- No. 462 Squadron RAAF
- No. 463 Squadron RAAF
- No. 464 Squadron RAAF
- No. 466 Squadron RAAF
- No. 467 Squadron RAAF

Five other RAAF squadrons were also under RAF operational control for the whole or part of the war:

Coastal Command

- No. 10 Squadron RAAF

Far East Air Force

- No. 1 Squadron RAAF
- No. 8 Squadron RAAF
- No. 21 Squadron RAAF

Desert Air Force

- No. 3 Squadron RAAF

=== Royal New Zealand Air Force ===
On 17 April 1941, a secondary agreement was signed by the British and New Zealand governments, to form a total of six Article XV squadrons for service with the RAF, from RNZAF personnel.

The New Zealand Article XV squadrons and individual RNZAF personnel in RAF units (like their RAAF and RCAF counterparts) were equipped, supplied and funded by the UK government (see above). However, as a rule, the New Zealand government and RNZAF allowed the UK government and RAF to exercise operational command and administration control of the New Zealand Article XV squadrons. As a consequence, these units have become widely regarded in New Zealand as "RAF" squadrons and are usually referred to by names following the style "4__ (NZ) Squadron RAF". Nevertheless, the official emblems of the six New Zealand Article XV squadrons refer to them as "4__ Squadron, Royal New Zealand Air Force", and some historians, such as Bill Gunston have referred to them similarly. As Gerard S. Morris explains: "although the squadron badges carried the name Royal New Zealand Air Force ... 485 Squadron was referred to informally as 485 (New Zealand) or 485 (NZ) and never as 485 Squadron, RNZAF (italics added)." In New Zealand, only units controlled directly by the New Zealand government and operating entirely in the Pacific Theatre are regarded as "RNZAF" units.

No. 75 (New Zealand) Squadron RAF, a heavy bomber unit, was not officially an Article XV squadron although it was composed mainly of RNZAF aircrew and the entire unit was transferred from the RAF to the RNZAF following the end of World War II.

Many individual New Zealanders also joined the RAF itself before and during the war. Several became aces (including "Cobber" Kain, Al Deere, Colin Gray and Brian Carbury) and/or senior commanders (such as Air Chief Marshal Sir Keith Park and Air Marshal Sir Arthur Coningham). (Note: both having joined the British Army's Royal Flying Corps during the First World War and had been officers in the RAF from its inception in 1918)

The six New Zealand Article XV squadrons were:

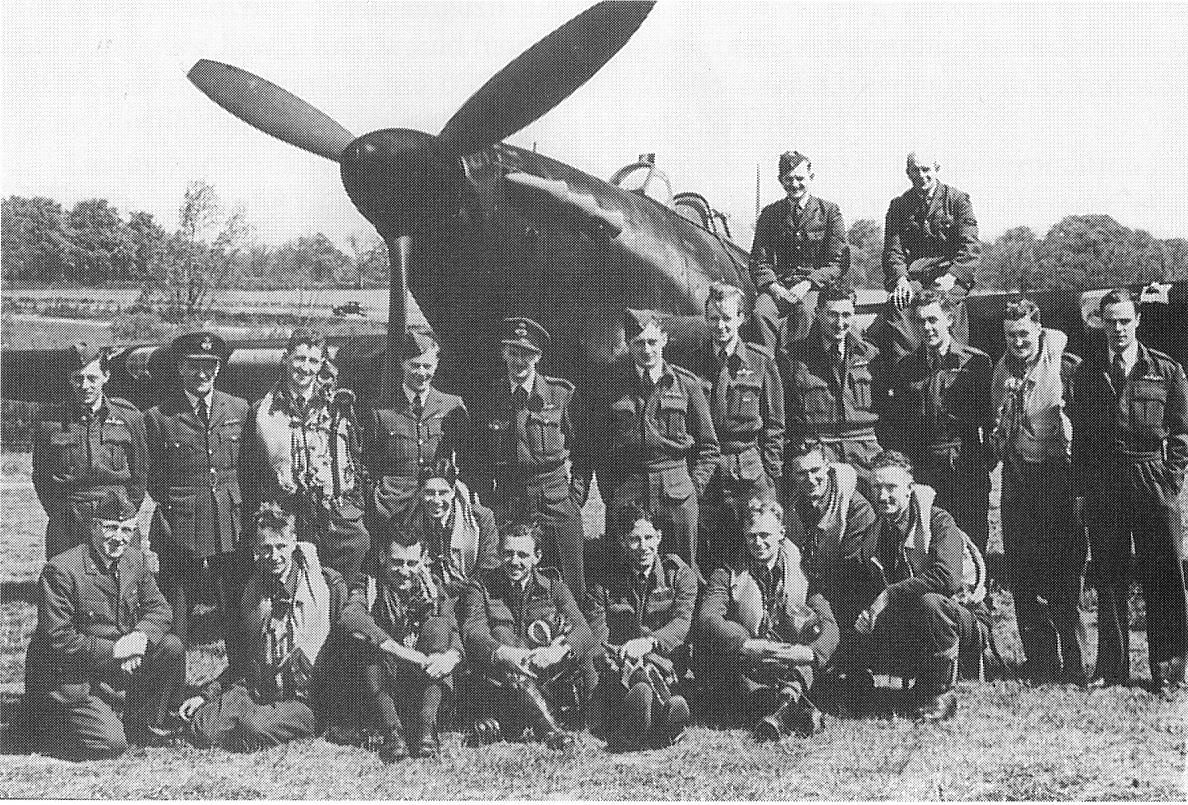
Hurricane night fighter pilots from No. 486 Squadron at RAF Wittering in 1942

- 485 (NZ) Squadron (fighter; fighter-bomber)
- 486 (NZ) Squadron (fighter-bomber; fighter)
- 487 (NZ) Squadron (light bomber; fighter-bomber)
- 488 (NZ) Squadron (fighter; night fighter)
- 489 (NZ) Squadron (maritime strike – torpedo bomber)
- 490 (NZ) Squadron (maritime patrol – flying boat)

== See also ==
- List of Royal Air Force aircraft squadrons
- List of Royal Australian Air Force aircraft squadrons
- List of Royal Canadian Air Force aircraft squadrons
- List of Royal New Zealand Air Force aircraft squadrons

== Bibliography ==
- Morris, Gerard S. (2000). Spitfire: The New Zealand Story. Auckland, New Zealand: Reed Books. ISBN 0-7900-0696-0.
- Thompson, H. L. (1953). New Zealanders with the Royal Air Force. Official History of New Zealand in the Second World War 1939–45. Vol. I. Wellington: War History Branch. OCLC 270919916.
