= 3I =

3I or 3-I may refer to:

- Iniziative Industriali Italiane
  - 3I Sky Arrow
- 3i London-based private equity and venture capital company
- 3-I League, see Illinois–Indiana–Iowa League
- 3i Infrastructure, an investment business headquartered in Jersey
- 3i Infotech Limited, an Indian IT company
- ESX Server 3i, a version of VMware ESX
- Comet 3I/ATLAS, the third known interstellar interloper

== See also ==
- I3 (disambiguation)
