= Old Sarum Airfield =

Airport in Salisbury, Wiltshire, England

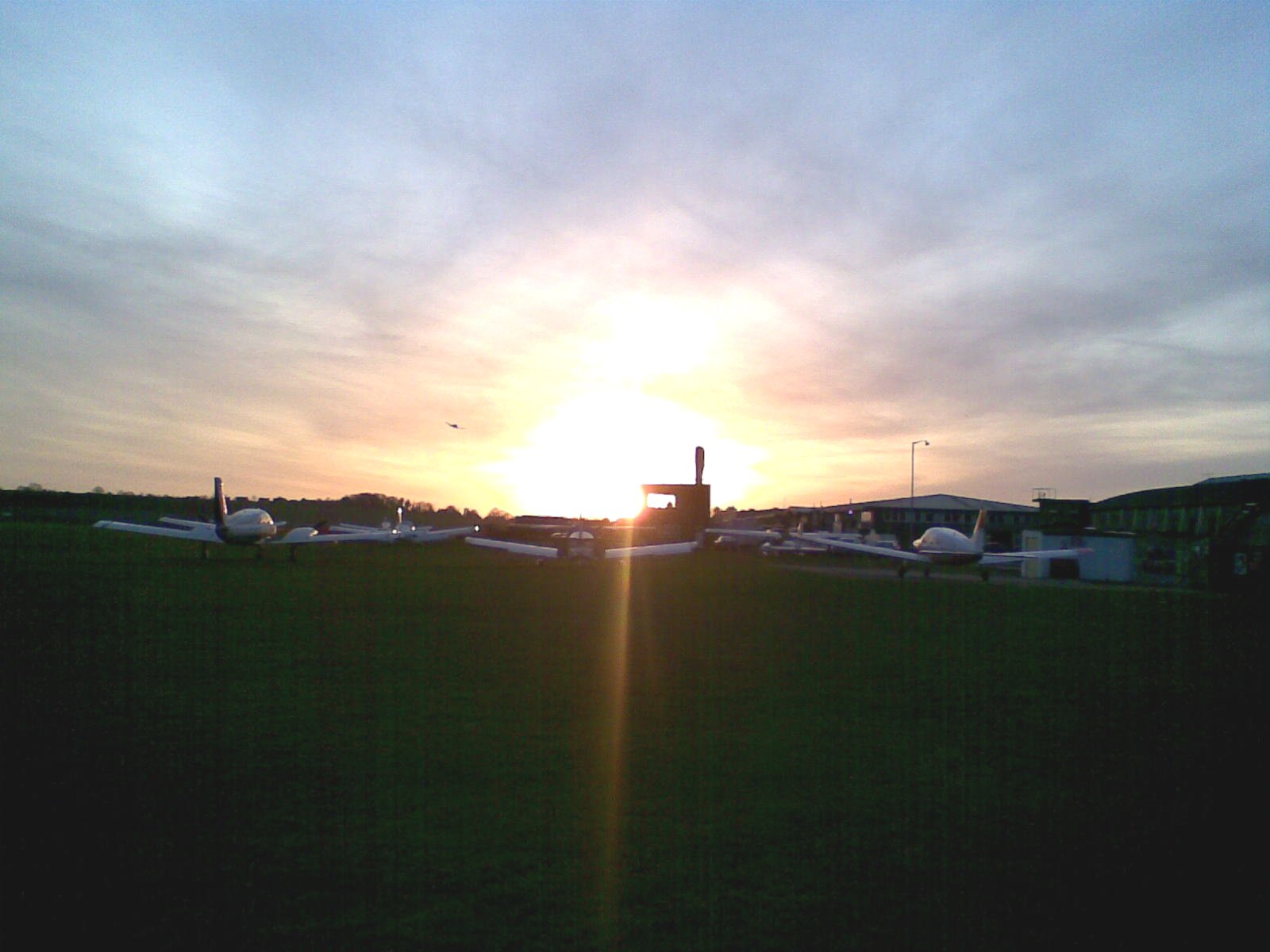
- View of the apron and tower during sunset
- IATA: none; ICAO: EGLS

Summary
- Airport type: Private
- Owner: Blanefield Property Company Ltd
- Operator: Old Sarum Airfield Ltd.
- Location: Salisbury
- Closed: 31 Oct 2019
- Elevation AMSL: 285 ft (87 m)
- Coordinates: 51°05′56″N 001°47′03″W
- Website: www.oldsarumairfield.co.uk

Map
- Location in Wiltshire

Runways
Direction	Length		Surface
Direction	m	ft	Surface
06/24	781	2,562	Grass
- Sources: UK AIP at NATS

Old Sarum Airfield (ICAO: EGLS) is a grass strip airfield 2 miles (3.2 kilometres)} north-north-east of Salisbury, in Laverstock parish, Wiltshire, England.

The adjacent areas are a mix of vacant land, residential and industrial sites. Residential areas lie to the south and east, occupying the old airfield married quarters and officers' mess, now known as Throgmorton Hall. Industrial/business units occupy a number of the First World War and Second World War airfield buildings, as well as several large modern warehouses, office blocks and car showrooms.

Old Sarum is a well-preserved flying field of the First World War period, bounded by one of the most complete suites of technical and hangar buildings of the period. The site has three Grade II* listed hangars and a Grade II listed former workshop, all built in 1918, as well as a Grade II listed Territorial Army Headquarters (the 1935 Station Headquarters).

The airfield was designated as a conservation area by Salisbury District Council in February 2007.

An aviation museum opened in Hangar 1 in July 2012, after the Boscombe Down Aviation Collection relocated from the nearby Boscombe Down airfield.

== Airspace and procedures ==
Old Sarum airfield Aerodrome Traffic Zone (ATZ) sits within the nearby MoD Boscombe Down Military Aerodrome Traffic Zone (MATZ). Old Sarum Airfield procedures dictate that all circuits, weekday and weekend, are to the south with a crosswind departure and a base leg joins at circuit height. During the times when the MATZ is inactive, Boscombe Down's ATZ is still active.

The aerodrome has a CAA Ordinary Licence (number P768) that allows flights for the public transport of passengers or for flying instruction as authorised by the licensee, Blanefield Airfield Operations. The aerodrome is not currently licensed for night use. Unlicensed night flying is permitted but the airfield owners chose not to allow night flying from 2007 in order to reduce noise complaints under an understanding with Salisbury District Council, as it then was. The owners later decided to install lights and resume night flying for a time.

== History ==
=== First World War ===
The site for Old Sarum Airfield – just east of the hill on which stood the abandoned medieval settlement of Old Sarum – was selected in 1917, to provide a training station for the rapidly expanding Royal Flying Corps. Like many others of this period, the airfield was provided with a cluster of general service sheds and a camp consisting largely of wooden buildings. It was opened in August 1917 and was briefly known at first as 'Ford Farm' but very soon took instead the name of the local landmark.

Its first task was to act as a base for the formation of three new day bomber squadrons which would ultimately be sent across the English Channel to operate in France. The Royal Air Force (RAF) was founded on 1 April 1918, by the amalgamation of the Royal Flying Corps and Royal Naval Air Service. On the same day a new flying training unit was formed at Old Sarum, to become the airfield's principal resident unit. This was 11 Training Depot Station, whose task was the operational training of fresh aircrews.

=== 1918 to 1939 ===
At the end of the First World War, Old Sarum was one of the few airfields which were not closed as part of the post war run-down. In 1920, 11 Training Squadron was disbanded and preparations were made to turn the station into the permanent home of the School of Army Co-operation. The School was transferred to Old Sarum from Stonehenge Aerodrome in January 1921 and for many years ran mixed courses for Army and Air Force personnel. Its prime task was the development of efficient air/ground communication under operational conditions, principally between Army officers, including those of the newly formed armoured forces, and the pilots and observers of the RAF Army Cooperation Squadrons.

A 'Special Duty Flight' was formed here in about 1926 to work with the Experimental Gas School at Porton Down, not far away. This used a handful of aircraft including a Bristol Fighter, a Dart and a Horsley, and was transferred to Netheravon in 1928. In April 1924, 16 Squadron was re-formed at Old Sarum for cooperation with Army units in Southern Command. Initially equipped with Bristol F.2 Fighters, it subsequently received the Armstrong Whitworth Atlas, in January 1931, and Hawker Audaxes in December 1933. With these types it took part in exercises all over southern England. In June 1938 it became the first unit to equip with the Westland Lysander.

The mid-1930s saw the beginning of the RAF expansion scheme, where many First World War airfield sites were inspected to see if they would be suitable for the new permanent stations which were planned due to the increased threat to Britain from Nazi Germany. Old Sarum Airfield was identified as suitable for becoming a permanent station, and the period between 1934 and 1937 saw the construction of new domestic, administrative and technical buildings. This increased the area of the airfield occupied by station buildings from 7.5 ha (19 acres) to roughly 22 ha (54 acres). The flying field remained the same size.

Three other operational squadrons were based at the airfield for varying periods between 1935 and 1939. First of these was another army cooperation unit, 13 Squadron, whose Audaxes were based here from May 1935. Next came the Hawker Hinds of a new light bomber squadron – 107 – which stayed here until 1937. The third unit, 59 Squadron, was formed here in June 1937 and was a new army cooperation unit, intended to carry out night reconnaissance using Hawker Hector aircraft. Subsequently, it was decided to replace these with higher-performance Bristol Blenheims and in May 1939 the squadron transferred to Andover to make the transition.

=== Second World War ===
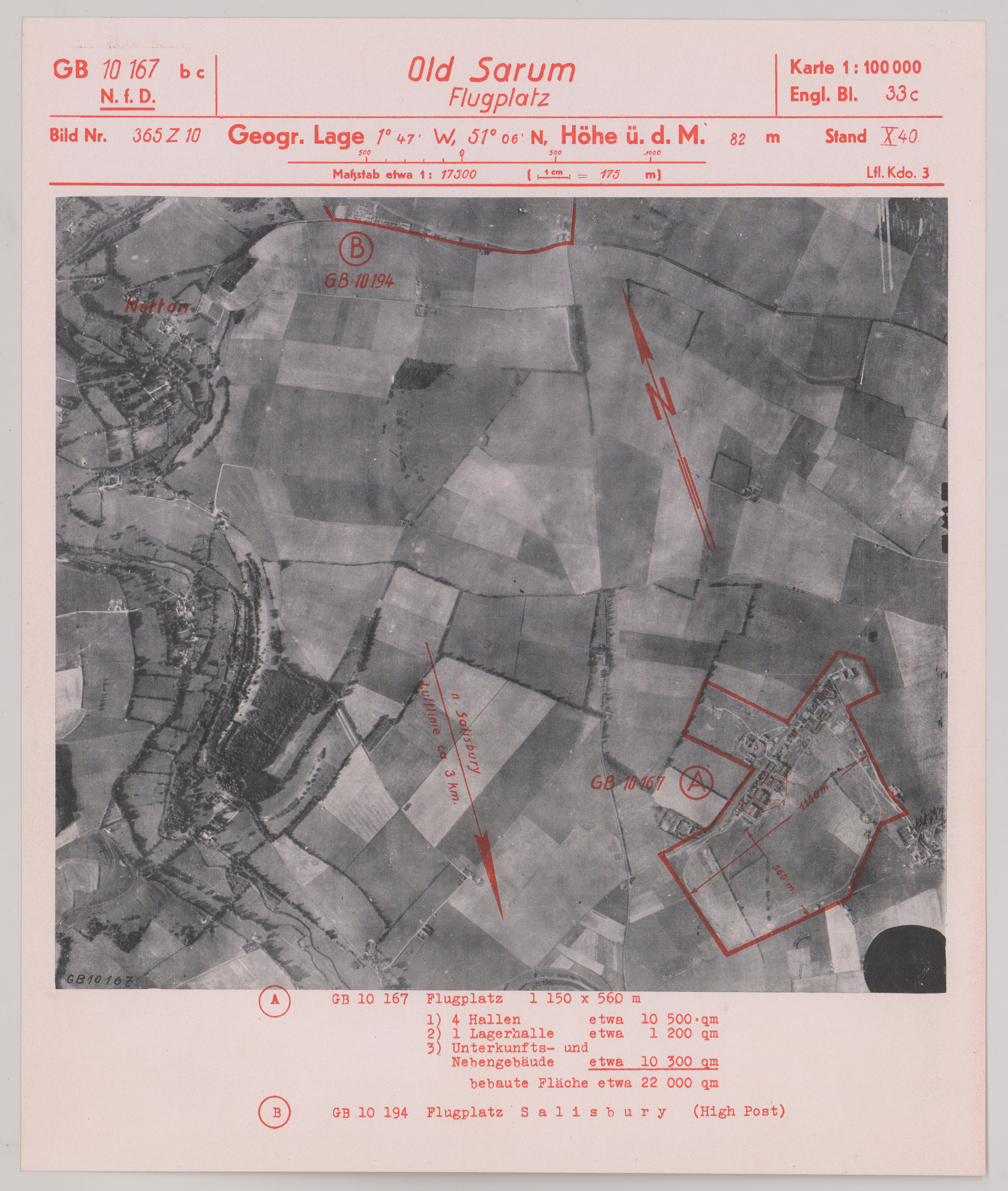
Old Sarum Airfield on a target dossier of the German Luftwaffe, 1940

At the outbreak of war, the appearance of RAF Old Sarum had changed little. Its line of hangars still looked out onto the grass flying field, while a Roman road still formed the northern border of the airfield. The squadron continued to be primarily engaged in training and developing ground support techniques, including the spraying of poison gas, although this was never actually used. In February the 16 Squadron left for France via RAF Hawkinge and its place was taken by the first two Canadian flying units to arrive in Britain – 111 and 112 Royal Canadian Air Force (RCAF) Squadrons. The final operational unit to be based here during this period was 225 Squadron RAF, another Lysander equipped unit. This took the place of 110 RCAF Squadron on 9 June 1940 and with the growing threat of a Nazi invasion of the Britain, it was engaged in patrolling the south coast for enemy landings.

In 1939, the establishment of aircraft was increased to serve the expanding School of Army Co-operation. In February 1940 a new 'D' Flight was formed within the School for artillery spotting duties. It was out-stationed at Larkhill to be close to the Royal Artillery camp there, and served as the nucleus from which all future air observation post (AOP) units originated.

During the Battle of Britain, as losses mounted, the shortage of fighter pilots became so desperate that a number of army cooperation trainees were selected at Old Sarum and immediately sent to Hawker Hurricane and Supermarine Spitfire training units. During the massive campaign of enemy attacks on RAF airfields in the summer and autumn of 1940, Old Sarum escaped lightly, but during the night of 11/12 May 1941 one hangar was burnt out in an air raid and two aircraft were destroyed.

During the first two years of war, it became clear that higher performance aircraft were needed and so a small number of Hurricanes and Harvards joined the unit in early 1941; they were soon followed by a flight of Curtiss P-40 Tomahawks. Because of the limitations of the landing ground at Old Sarum, a larger satellite was prepared at Oatlands Hill, some 5 mi (8.0 km) away to the north-west. Oatlands Hill was equipped with only basic flying facilities and most of the maintenance work had still to be undertaken at Old Sarum, but henceforth all higher performance aircraft would carry out their training programmes at Oatlands Hill.

In August 1941, the first full AOP squadron was formed. This was 651 Squadron and it was equipped with Taylorcrafts, flown by specially trained army pilots. They were frequently detached to Larkhill to train with the gunners there, and in the following spring the squadron joined Army manoeuvres, thus establishing the practice of sending small detachments of aircraft to improvised advanced landing grounds "in the field".

The advances in size and performance of aircraft types from the Lysander to the Tomahawk prompted a reorganisation, and the Training Wing was redesignated 41 Operational Training Unit. The development and teaching of methods of artillery reconnaissance were undertaken here from 1942. However, these activities required a permanent runway instead of a flying field, and so 41 OTU was transferred out in 1942. It was replaced by a new Fleet Air Arm Squadron, developing tactical reconnaissance. In 1942 Old Sarum became the principal base for the training of AOP with three new squadrons, and 43 OTU moved from Larkhill to Old Sarum. While it was engaged in training new pilots, the facilities at Old Sarum continued to be used for the formation of new Auster squadrons.

655 Squadron formed in December 1942 for Southern Command, and took part in the huge "Spartan" exercise in East Anglia in July 1943 which tested the efficiency of Army co-operation squadrons under mobile conditions, and was effectively a rehearsal for the invasion and liberation of North-West Europe. This led to the formation of Tactical Air Forces (TAF), which were created as replacements for RAF Army Cooperation Command.

The School of Army Cooperation had been reformed at Old Sarum in June 1943 and was subsequently retitled the RAF School of Army Cooperation. In 1944 it was reorganised as the School of Air Support with its own small fleet of aircraft. The experiences of war had highlighted the importance of inter-service cooperation, and increasingly personnel from all three services became based at Old Sarum.

1944 marked the end of a period of major expansion in the AOP squadrons; the spare hangar space at Old Sarum Airfield was used by 3505 Servicing Unit, which maintained numerous aircraft operating in small and scattered detachments to provide practice facilities for anti-aircraft and searchlight sites.

The brick-built buildings now occupied by Wessex Archaeology immediately adjacent to the airfield include two operations/large scale map rooms with upper viewing galleries: one is now the company's drawing office and the other is the finds processing area.

==== D-Day ====
Plans for the D-Day landings were well advanced by early 1944 and included the requisition of all of the facilities at Old Sarum, to form part of the 2nd TAF Concentration Area. This was, in effect, the hinterland and supply location of the many ports and embarkation points of the ships and landing craft of the invasion forces. All flying training was terminated and 43 OTU left the station entirely.

Thousands of ground personnel, and virtually all RAF motor transport vehicles, destined for Normandy passed through Old Sarum in the D-Day preparation period, making it an integral part in the organisational structure of the D-Day landings. Seven large tented camps were set up in the countryside around the airfield and a force of over a thousand fitters was established to undertake the waterproofing of the 25,000 invasion vehicles. A large part of the airfield was used to assemble the long lines of trucks and other vehicles, and the station hangars were pressed into service as the principal workshops.

As D-Day arrived, there were 34 aircraft at Old Sarum Airfield from three squadrons (658, 659 and 662) waiting to be called forward. Ground support units, ranging from Sector Headquarters and Signals Wings to Servicing Parties and Repair Units continued to pass through until the flow finally ceased in November.

==== Oatlands Hill ====
The satellite site at Oatlands Hill was just south of the A303, about 4 miles (6 km) west of Amesbury. It opened in June 1941 and had three grass airstrips, four blister hangars and a few small buildings. The first users were Tomahawks of 239 Squadron, and from September 1941 No. 41 OTU used the site for AOP training as an extension of Old Sarum. This form of usage continued after 43 OTU replaced 41 at Old Sarum in 1942, and Oatlands became the home of 43 OTU when they were ejected from Old Sarum in February 1944 to make room for D-Day preparations. They found the accommodation too small for their officers, men and 30 Austers, and decamped to Andover in August. From late May to late July 1944, a detachment of the 47th Liaison Squadron USAAF was here. For a short time in 1945, RCAF AOP squadrons were trained here.

The Oatlands site closed in May 1945 or in 1946 and returned to farmland. One blister hangar, the station's sick quarters and some foundations and hardstandings remain.

=== Post Second World War ===
In May 1947, the School was re-designated the School of Land/Air Warfare, training Air Force, Army and Navy officers from both the UK and other NATO countries. On 26 June 1956, in recognition of its importance and longevity, RAF Old Sarum was honoured by being given the Freedom of the City of Salisbury. At about the same time, the station also became the home of the Army Air Training and Development Centre which, although 'officed' by the Parachute Regiment, mainly consisted of other corps. REME developed parachute drops of light vehicles and artillery whilst RE undertook the training.

A RAF flying club, the Bustard Flying Club, was formed in 1957 flying two de Havilland Tiger Moth aircraft. The aircraft were used for flying training, with RAF instructors.

One new aspect of post war aviation, which was of interest to all three services, was the widespread use of helicopters. Accordingly, on 1 June 1961, the RAF element of the Helicopter Development Unit (HDU) was formed at Old Sarum, with a handful of early helicopter prototypes, Bristol Sycamores and Westland Whirlwinds, to explore their military potential. In 1965 a new Joint Helicopter Development Unit (JHDU) was formed at Old Sarum and it immediately absorbed the former HDU, which became a section entitled 'Short Range Transport Development Unit'. In 1963 622 (Volunteer) Gliding School (VGS) became based at Old Sarum. The School of Land/Air Warfare was amalgamated with the Amphibious Warfare School from RM Poole in Dorset to form the Joint Warfare Establishment, equipped with a few Whirlwinds and Westland Wessexes.

The final change was the amalgamation of Army Air Transport Development and the JHDU in 1968, to become the Joint Air Transport Establishment (JATE). Old Sarum was transferred from the RAF to the Army in December 1971; the JHDU was disbanded in 1976 but flying continued until November 1978 when 622 VGS moved to Upavon. From 1979 the airfield was no longer a military base.

=== 1982 to 2001 ===
In 1982 the airfield was sold to Edgley Aircraft Ltd on a 999-year lease, together with the freehold of Hangar 1 (later destroyed by fire), Hangar 2, the original control tower and other ancillary buildings adjacent to Hangar 1 and between Hangar 1 and the Portway (now all demolished). All these buildings belonged to the World War I phase of the airfield's development. The buildings were used by Edgley for the design and manufacture of the Edgley Optica light observation aircraft and the airfield used to undertake test flying using the runway currently in existence and as defined by the Ministry of Defence in the 999-year lease.

In 1982 a licence was granted to Wiltshire Aerospace Club (later Old Sarum Flying Club) to occupy Hangar 3 and the airfield. This was turned into a lease in April 1985.

In 1986 the insolvent Optica business was purchased by Matthew Hudson to save it from closure and he renamed it Brooklands Aerospace Group, which continued the building and flying of Optica aircraft, and took on other aerospace sub-contracting activities for McDonnell Douglas and British Aerospace. In 1986 Brooklands obtained a CAA licence for the airfield which formally defined the runway position and allowed flying training to be carried out (initially by the Wiltshire Aerospace Club). In 1989, the Bustard Flying Club moved to Boscombe Down, and has resided there ever since.

Following the destruction of Hangar 1 by fire in 1987, Brooklands purchased Hangar 3 (the easternmost hangar). In 1989 the airfield lease and Hangar 3 was purchased by Blanefield Investments and Brooklands continued aircraft manufacture in Hangar 2 for a short period before moving manufacture to Hurn airport (now Bournemouth Airport).

Old Sarum also played host to the Dorset Gliding Club from October 1981, using Slingsby T.21 gliders and an ex-MOD mobile hangar, before moving to Eyres Field in 1989.

=== 2001 to 2019 ===
Old Sarum Flying Club operated as a civilian flying club from May 1992, offering a variety of training, until ceasing to exist in May 2008. At the turn of the century, the club operated 20 aircraft, including a 1943 Boeing Stearman, and had over 800 members.

Subsequently, a new organisation called Old Sarum Flying School provided flying training along school rather than club lines. OSFS operated Piper PA-28s and Aero AT-3s, until the business was rebranded as GoFly UK in February 2013, as a sister company to the Old Sarum-based GoSkyDive. AirSport UK and the Shadow Flight Centre provided training on the Ikarus C42, Sky Arrow and CFM Shadow aircraft. The APT Charitable Trust provided flight training for physically disabled pilots, also using the CFM Shadow. Tiger Moth training and trial lessons were also provided by GoFly.

GoSkyDive (formerly SkyDive South Coast) began paradropping operations at Old Sarum in 2009, and operates a Cessna 208 in that role today, having previously used GA8 Airvan, Cessna 172 and Cessna 206 aircraft.

Salisbury District Council first designated Old Sarum Airfield a conservation area in January 2001. This decision was challenged in the High Court which held it to be unlawful, on the basis that there had been procedural errors in its making. The conservation area designation was therefore removed in December 2001. Changes in procedures for the creation of conservation areas allowed the airfield to be designated once more as a conservation area by Salisbury District Council in February 2007.

Hangar 1 has been used by the Boscombe Down Aviation Collection museum since July 2012.

In 2014 the site owners made public proposals regarding the regeneration of the airfield, on the basis that it would make the airfield commercially viable and secure its future. The proposals included a new visitor centre, air traffic control tower, corporate spaces and restaurant. The development would include 310 new homes on vacant land on the north western fringe of the airfield called Sarum Landings and 150 homes to the south of the field called Sarum Field.

== Since 2019 ==
It was announced in a letter to aircraft owners in July 2019 that Old Sarum Airfield would close on 31 October 2019, due to seven-figure losses reported by the airfield's owners. This followed a five-year planning battle between Old Sarum Airfield Limited and Wiltshire Council. The proposal by the company was to build 462 houses on the perimeter of the airfield, which would help to fund a £3m investment into a flying hub. Local people formed a "SOS – Save old Sarum" group and campaigned to stop the 462 houses being built, in order to preserve the airfield, the conservation area and its history. The airfield duly closed on 31 October 2019 and its future is uncertain.

In January 2023, according to the Old Sarum Airfield Ltd website, the airfield was still operational, but only by prior arrangement.

In January 2024, most of the roof of Hangar 3 collapsed during Storm Ischa. Earlier that month, Old Sarum Airfield Ltd had submitted a planning application to repair and refurbish the hangar; the cost of the proposed work was reported to be £3 million. In April 2025, the rest of Hangar 3 and its attached buildings were destroyed by a fire.

== Boscombe Down Aviation Collection ==
The Boscombe Down Aviation Collection (BDAC) museum relocated from MoD Boscombe Down in July 2012, and took up residence in Hangar 1. The collection has many static aircraft exhibits, and in 2014 expanded into a second hangar to allow operational vintage aircraft to be associated with the collection whilst still flying from Old Sarum.

A number of complete and partial aircraft in the collection have links to the Aeroplane and Armament Experimental Establishment which operated from 1918 to 1992 at Boscombe Down. Volunteers have built, refurbished or recreated several historic aircraft including a Westland Scout helicopter and the front section of a Lancaster bomber. They also built a replica Royal Aircraft Factory B.E.2B, the first aircraft to land at Boscombe Down Airfield in 1917. Other exhibits are on loan from the RAF Museum.

The museum is run by Boscombe Down Aviation Collection Limited, a company limited by guarantee and a registered charity.

== Accidents and incidents ==
- In August 2017, a Vans RV6A (G-CCVS), who was practicing landings, inverted upon landing due to a damaged nose gear caused by a hard landing on a previous attempt. The pilot was able to escape the aircraft unharmed after several people had lifted the aircraft up via the tail. The aircraft suffered significant fuselage distortion.
- In May 2015, a De Havilland Tiger Moth flipped inverted on landing. Neither of the occupants was injured.
- In April 2011, a Magni M24C Orion gyroplane crashed whilst attempting to return to the airfield. The sole occupant was fatally injured.
- Numerous incidents occurred with the locally based fleet of Aero AT3s, including one runway excursion and one forced landing close to the airfield. No fatalities occurred.
- In July 2012, a microlight crashed during takeoff, blocking the runway for several hours. Both occupants were taken to hospital with minor injuries. Earlier that year, in May, a light aircraft crashed into pig houses at the end of the runway whilst trying to land; both pilots were uninjured.
- In April 2013, a light aircraft landed upside down, but neither pilot aboard suffered injury.
