= No. 666 Squadron RCAF =

- Active: 5 March – 31 October 1945
- Country: Canada
- Allegiance: Canada
- Branch: Royal Canadian Air Force and Royal Canadian Artillery
- Role: Air Observation/Air Taxi & Communications
- Part of: No. 84 Group RAF, 2nd Tactical Air Force

Insignia
- Squadron Codes: BX (Mar 1945 – Sep 1945)

Aircraft flown
- Reconnaissance: Auster Mk.V

No. 666 Squadron RCAF was originally an RCAF air observation post (AOP) squadron formed during the Second World War. It was manned principally by Royal Canadian Artillery (RCA) and Royal Canadian Air Force (RCAF) personnel.

== History ==
Numbers 651 to 663 Squadrons of the RAF were air observation post units working closely with army units in artillery spotting and liaison.

In 1944. the Canadian parliament voted for the creation of three additional AOP squadrons to support of the First Canadian Army.

These squadrons were approved on the RCAF list in the late summer of 1944: No. 664 Squadron RCAF, No. 665 Squadron RCAF, and No. 666 Squadron RCAF. The Canadian pilots were officers recruited from the Royal Canadian Artillery. They were trained to fly at No. 22 Elementary Flying Training School at Cambridge, and further trained for operational flying at No. 43 Operational Training Unit RAF, at RAF Andover.

The squadron was formed at RAF Andover, on 5 March 1945, the third air observation post squadron consisting of Canadian personnel to be formed at RAF Andover, The squadron operated under the overall command of No. 70 Group, RAF Fighter Command.

Royal Canadian Artillery Major Dave Ely initially took command of each of the three squadrons, and was assisted by two RCAF Flight Lieutenants, D. Dougall (Acting Squadron Adjutant) and A.R. Woodhouse (Squadron Equipment officer). Major Ely was also assisted by nine AOP trained Royal Artillery Officers, who began training the squadron's other ranks.

In the last week of March 1945, 666 Squadron's aircraft – sixteen Auster Mark V's – began to arrive, along with the squadron's ground transport. On 7 May 1945, ten qualified Canadian AOP pilots were posted to the squadron, and from their ranks, Captain A.B. Stewart was elevated to Squadron Captain. In April, 666 began a succession of moves. On 17 April, they moved to Alfriston Aerodrome; on 28 May, to Gilze-Rijen, the Netherlands; and on 6 June, the headquarters moved at Hilversum, and the squadron's three subordinate Flights were dispersed to Dordrecht, Alkmaar, and Ede.

On 12 June, Major Ely was reassigned to Canadian Far East Force (CFEF), and was replaced by Major A.B. Stewart as Officer Commanding. Through the summer of 1945, the squadron was tasked with 'air taxi' duties in support of 1st Canadian Infantry Division, 3rd Canadian Infantry Division, and #1 Canadian AGRA (Army Groups Royal Artillery). On 25 June, 666 Squadron moved from Hilversum to Apeldoorn, joining No. 664 Squadron and 665 Squadron in that location, then under the overall command of the First Canadian Army.

When 665 Squadron was disbanded on 10 July 1945, many of its remaining personnel were transferred to 666 Squadron. Tasking thereafter included VIP, Courier, and Communications Flight duties in support of the Canadian Army Occupation Force (CAOF). No. 666 Squadron RCAF in its turn was disbanded at Apeldoorn on 31 October 1945. The squadron had no motto or heraldic badge assigned to it.

== Squadron bases ==
Bases and airfields used by no. 666 Squadron RCAF, data from
From	To	Base
5 March 1945	18 April 1945	RAF Andover, Hampshire
18 April 1945	28 May 1945	RAF Friston, Suffolk
28 May 1945	6 June 1945	B.77/Gilze-Rijen, Netherlands
6 June 1945	25 June 1945	Hilversum, Netherlands
25 June 1945	30 September 1945	'JOE' Airfield (Apeldoorn), Netherlands

== Notable personnel ==
- Major D.R. Ely
- Major A.B. Stewart
- Captain A.D. Carpenter ('B' Flight Commander)
- Captain J.M. Doohan
- Captain R.O. Lundgren ('C' Flight Commander)
- Captain A.S. MacPherson ('A' Flight Commander)
- Maurice Bouchard ('A' Flight Cook)
