= No. 653 Squadron AAC =

Flying squadron of the British Army's Army Air Corps

653 Squadron AAC No. 653 Squadron RAF
- Active: 20 June 1942 – 15 September 1945 (RAF); 11 May 1958 – 19 Oct 1967; 1 Nov 1971 – present
- Country: United Kingdom
- Branch: (United Kingdom) British Army
- Part of: 7 Regiment Army Air Corps
- Garrison/HQ: Army Aviation Centre Middle Wallop
- Mottos: Latin: Ubique Speculabundus (Translation: "The eyes of the guns are everywhere")
- Mascot: The Pink Panther

Insignia
- Squadron badge heraldry: In front of two gun barrels in saltire, an eagle's head affrontée erased

Aircraft flown
- Attack helicopter: Boeing AH64E Apache

653 Squadron AAC is a squadron of the British Army's Army Air Corps (AAC). It traces much of its history to No. 653 Squadron Royal Air Force, an air observation post squadron active from 20 June 1942 to 15 September 1945, during and after the Second World War. These units spotted targets for the British Army and flew liaison tasks.

Their duties and squadron numbers were transferred to the Army with the formation of the Army Air Corps on 1 September 1957.

== History ==
No. 653 Squadron RAF was formed at RAF Old Sarum, Wiltshire, the home of Army co-operation, on 20 June 1942 and moved to Farnborough the following month. Originally equipped with de Havilland Tiger Moths, the Squadron later re-armed with Taylorcraft Auster Mk Is. Training commenced with Eastern Command and exercises were carried out with 12 Corps and with 45, 46 and 53 Divisions. On 7 September 1942 the Squadron transferred to RAF Penshurst in Kent.

During March 1943 the unit took part, with other AOP Squadrons, in Exercise Spartan, and on 1 June 1943 was transferred from Army Co-operation Command to No. 11 Group of Fighter Command. From the middle of August a month was spent in Sissinghurst area in co-operation with 12 Corps on Exercise Peacock, on completion of which the Squadron returned to its station at Penhurst.

Training continued through the first half of 1944 under the control of No. 83 Group of 2nd TAF, until on 26 June 1944, the Squadron left England for France. The Squadron landed in Normandy at 0730 hours on 27 June 1944 and proceeded direct to its landing ground at Rucqueville. The first sorties carried out were against suspected mortar positions which were registered for attention by the artillery. One aircraft of "C" Flight succeeded in directing fire on to a vehicle column and inflicting damage which blocked the road. The flight areas were shelled by the enemy on a number of occasions during the period but little damage was suffered, except on one night when all "B" Flight aircraft were lost as the result of a low-level bombing and machine gun attack.

During August the Squadron flew information sorties over the enemy withdrawal from Noyers and Epenay and provided standing patrols of the 53 and 59 Division fronts. Sorties were flown over Falise in the latter half of the month and messages were dropped to British armour informing them of the positions of German Tiger tanks which were holding up the advance. The area Falaise-Trun-Chambois was thoroughly searched for targets and the accuracy of the AOP Squadrons direction later became apparent as the advance covered the ground over which the Austers had been operating.

The Squadron's moves were frequent in order to keep up with the forward troops and on more than one occasion the Squadron found itself sharing a new location with scattered units of German forces. At Frevest, in September "A" Flight was shelled by enemy artillery: on the same day men of "C" Flight engaged with a party of the enemy whom they attempted to ambush in a deserted house.

The Squadron moved into Belgium in September 1944, Squadron headquarters being established at Wintham, with a forward landing ground at Devberg. Later in the month a further move was made over the Dutch border to Eindhoven.

Landing grounds at Nijmegen and Uden were occupied in October 1944, although bad weather hampered visibility and restricted flying. During November patrols were maintained to report on the state of bridges over the River Maas and Wessem Canal and support was provided for the 51st Highland Division attack across the Afwaterings Canal. On the 14 November 1944 operation "Mallard" commenced with the object of driving the enemy across the River Maas and the Squadron flew a number of reconnaissances to discover the extent of the rivers flooding. Tac/R and photographic missions were also flown in the Rermond-Panningen area and over the defences of Venlo.

There was less activity during December 1944, but the Squadron continued to move up behind their ground forces. On 1 January 1945 two pilots of "C" Flight inaugurated the new year by making their first sortie over Germany itself in the area if Aachen. Operations by the Army commenced on 16 January 1945 to clear the enemy up to the line of the rivers Roer and Wuom and in support of these the Squadron engaged guns and infantry in the area of the advance. For its part in the operation the Squadron received congratulations from the commander of 12 Corps Artillery.

The Squadron was withdrawn from operations February 1945 for a period of rest and training which was pent at Diest. It recommenced operation in March 1945 in time to support the crossing of the Rhine and moved over the river at the end of the month. A landing ground at Ahaus was occupied on 1 April 1945 and sorties carried out over the Gronau area in expectation of a counter-attack which did not develop. Reconnaissances were maintained over the Emms-Weser Canal to report on the state of the bridges there and a large number of targets were found in the surrounding area including gun positions, troops and transport.

"B" Flight operated with the 7th Armoured Division in their break through from the river Aller bridgehead and provided cover to prevent the enemy from shelling the bridge under construction across the river.

The Squadron moved across the river Elbe at the beginning of May 1945 and on 7 May was concentrated on Altona aerodrom in Hamburg. A number of sorties were flown during the remainder of the month to provide information for 12 Corps on the movements of surrendered German forces and to report of shipping at Brunsbuttel and in the Kiel Canal.

Communication flights for the Corps were carried out until that formation returned to England, when the Squadron passed to the command of 8 Corps and was later to 30 Corps, moving to a landing ground at Hoya. There the Squadron was occupied with ferry and communication flights for 30 Corps with the exception of "B" Flight which fulfilled similar duties for the 7th Armoured Division from Itsehoe.

On 23 August 1945 the Squadron were transferred to 84 Group and on 15 September 1945 were finally disbanded after the German surrender.

== Reformation from 1958 ==
No. 653 Squadron came into being again in Kermia, Cyprus on 11 May 1958, but now as a squadron of the Army Air Corps. It then moved to Aden on 9 March 1961 and becoming HQ 3 Wing during 1965 serving in Aden till 1967. The unit was shortly disbanded on 19 October 1967 but was reformed at AAC Netheravon on 1 November 1971, it was remustered from 660 Squadron from December 1978 and moved to Germany on 1 November 1978.

The squadron operated the Apache AH.1 from Wattisham Airfield, with 3 Regiment Army Air Corps. After 2015 it became the Apache Conversion Squadron.

Upon retirement of the Apache AH.1 the Squadron moved to Middle Wallop retaining the role of Apache Conversion to Role (CTR) on the Apache AH-64E.

Locations and notes:

- Dhekelia (1960)
  RAF Sheikh Othman, Aden (1961)
  Falaise Airfield, Little Aden (9 Mar 1961 - 65)
  Det: Thumier (Habilayn) (1964 - 65)
- Became No. 3 Wing AAC (1965)
  Formerly No. 653 Light Aircraft Squadron AAC
  (Formerly No. 10 Flight AAC and No. 15 Flight AAC)
  Formerly No. 653 Aviation Squadron AAC

== Aircraft operated ==
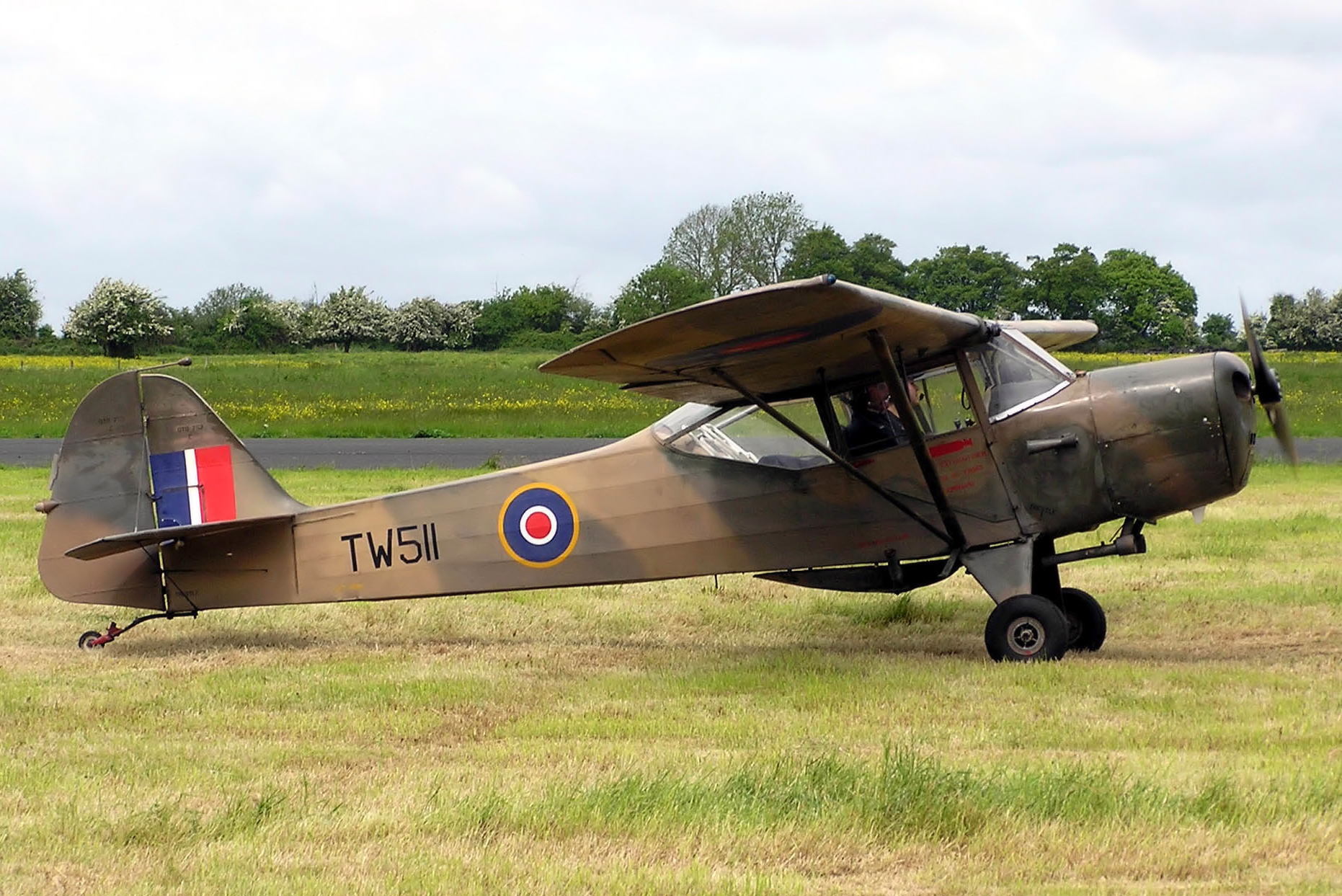
An Army Air Corps Auster V air observation post aircraft. One example is maintained by the Army Historic Aircraft Flight

Aircraft operated by no. 653 Squadron RAF, data from
From	To	Aircraft	Variant
June 1942	September 1942	de Havilland Tiger Moth	
Aug 1942	March 1943	Auster	Mk.I
March 1943	April 1944	Auster	Mk.III
February 1944	September 1945	Auster	Mk.IV
July 1944	September 1945	Auster	Mk.V
