= Taylorcraft Auster =

1942 British liaison aircraft family

Auster
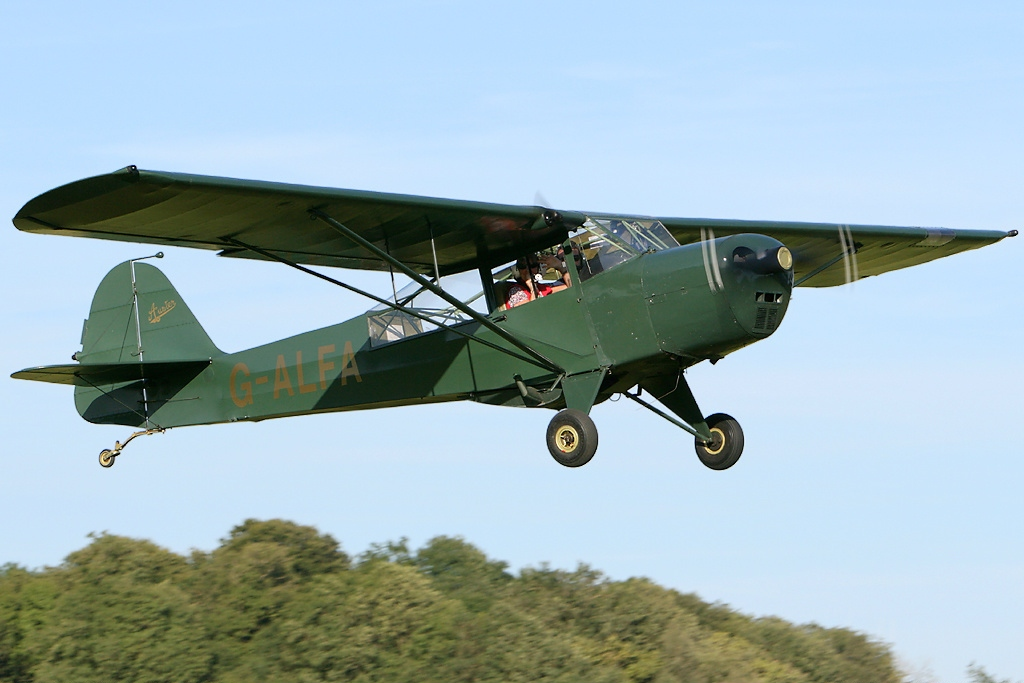
- Taylorcraft J Auster Mk5

General information
- Type: Liaison aircraft
- Manufacturer: Taylorcraft Aeroplanes (England) Limited
- Designer: Clarence Gilbert Taylor
- Primary users: Royal Air Force Royal Australian Air Force; Royal Canadian Air Force; Royal Netherlands Air Force
- Number built: 1,630

History
- Introduction date: 1942
- Developed from: Taylor Cub
- Developed into: Auster AOP.6; Beagle A.61 Terrier

The Taylorcraft Auster is a British military liaison and observation aircraft that was designed and produced by the Taylorcraft Aeroplanes (England) Limited company during the Second World War.

== Design and development ==
The Auster was a twice-removed development of an American Taylorcraft design of civilian aircraft, the Model A. The Model A had to be redesigned in Britain to meet more stringent Civil Aviation standards and was named the Taylorcraft Plus. After the start of the Second World War, the company developed the model further as an air observation post (AOP)—flown by officers of the Royal Artillery and used for directing artillery-fire of the artillery.

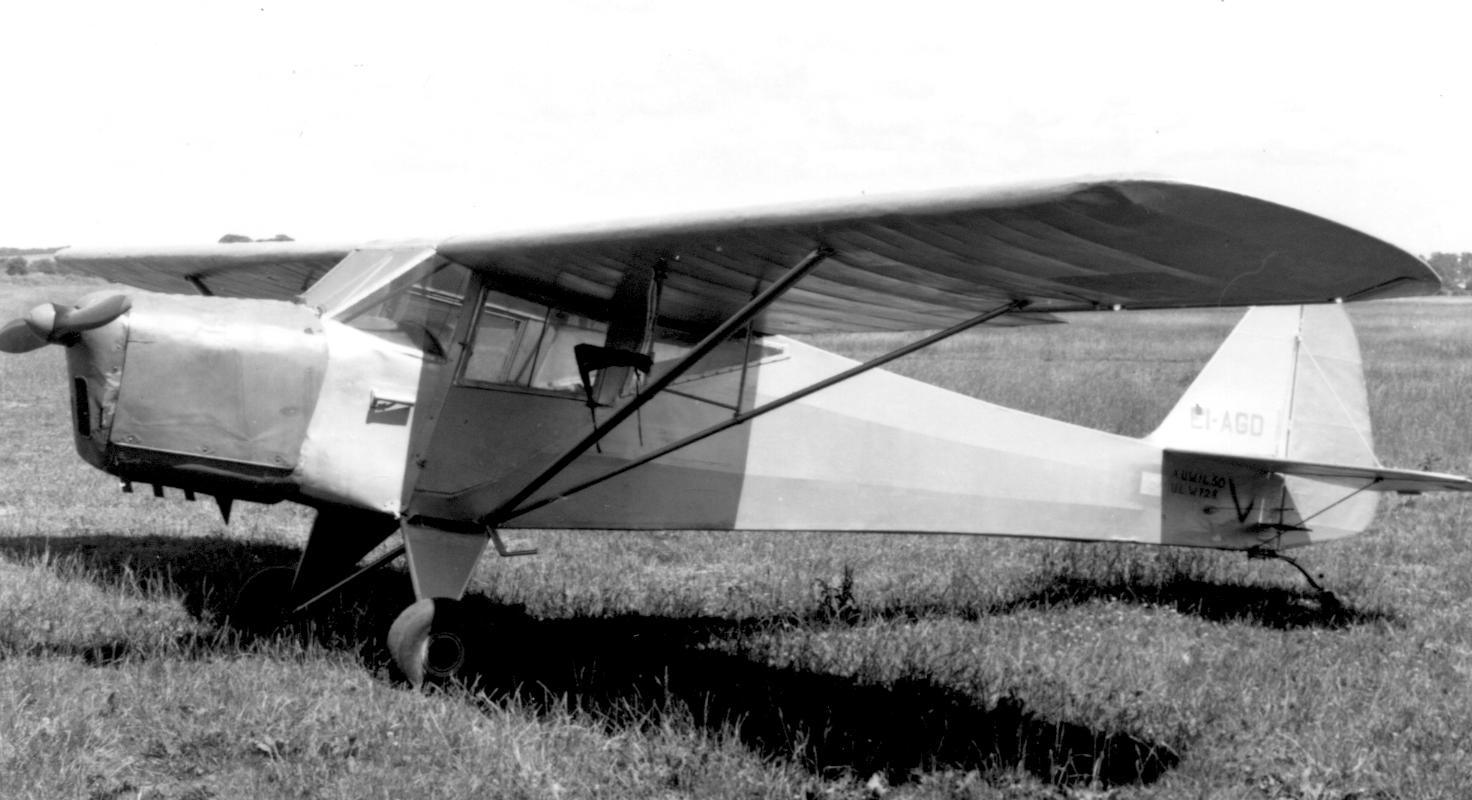
Prewar Taylorcraft C/2, impressed by the RAF in September 1941, seen postwar

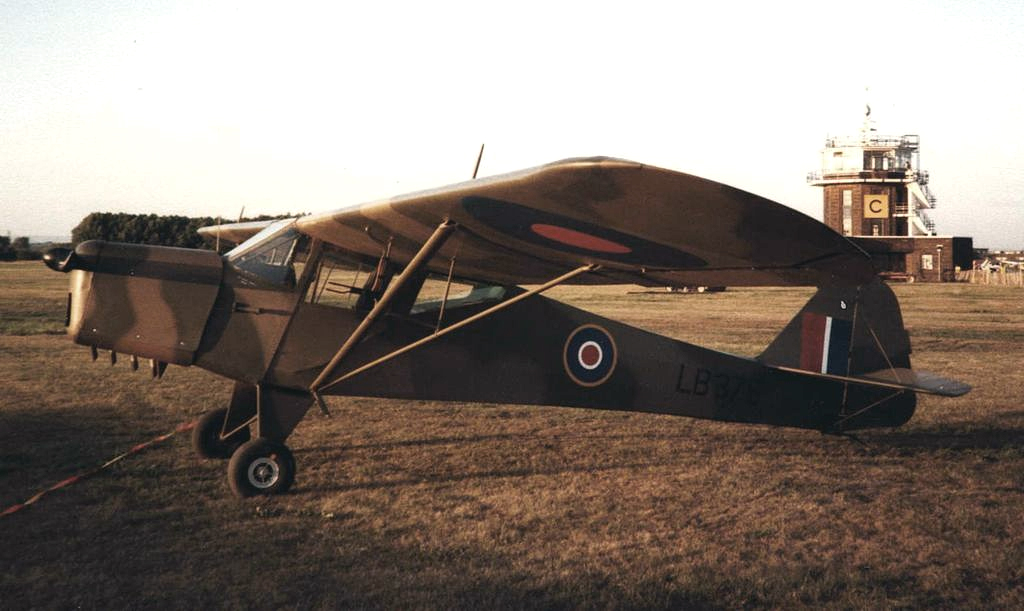
Auster I converted postwar to Taylorcraft Plus D, restored in wartime markings as LB382 of 653 Squadron RAF

The Plus C was re-engined with the Blackburn Cirrus Minor I engine and was re-named the Taylorcraft Plus D. Most of the civil Plus Cs and Ds were pressed into Royal Air Force service; the Plus Cs were re-engined with the Cirrus Minor I and re-named Plus C2.

Pre-war tests identified the Taylorcraft Model D as the most suitable aircraft for an AOP. Three more Ds were purchased from Taylorcraft and a trials unit, D Flight, under Major Charles Bazeley RA, formed at Old Sarum on 1 February 1940. The flight with three Austers, one Stinson 105, three artillery and one RAF pilot, moved to France where they trained with artillery and practised fighter avoidance with Hurricanes of the Air Component of the British Expeditionary Force before moving south to train with French artillery. The flight did not participate in the fighting and withdrew without loss to Britain. The War Office then ordered 100 Stinson L-1 Vigilants. Formation of the RAF Army Cooperation Command in December 1940 led to the RAF rejecting the very notion of light AOP aircraft.

Intercession by General Alan Brooke led to an accommodation and the first AOP pilot course for artillery officers taking place in October 1940. In 1941, the first AOP squadron, 651, formed. Stinson Vigilants eventually arrived in early 1942 but most had been severely damaged in transit leading to the adoption of the Taylorcraft Auster 1 and an order for 100 aircraft was placed. Some of the Stinsons were resurrected but found to be too big for the AOP squadrons.

The Auster II was a re-engined aircraft with an American 130 hp (97 kW) Lycoming O-290 engine. Due to the shortage of American engines that version was not built but led to the Auster III (Model E), which was the same as the Auster I but had a 130 hp (97 kW) de Havilland Gipsy Major engine. The next development was the Auster IV (Model G) which had a slightly larger cabin with three seats and used the Lycoming O-290. The main production version was the Auster V (Model J) which was an Auster IV with blind flying instruments, and a conventional trimmer design.

Post war, the Auster Mark V was used as the basis for the Auster J/1 Autocrat intended for the civilian market; the British firm having changed their name to Auster and stopped licensing from Taylorcraft. Further military aircraft were supplied, the Auster AOP6, Auster T7 (a trainer) and the Auster AOP9.

== Operational history ==
The Auster Mark III, IV and V were issued to twelve RAF, one Polish and three Royal Canadian Air Force (RCAF) air observation post (AOP) Squadrons. The first to deploy was 651 Squadron. The leading elements landed in Algiers on 12 November 1942 with eight aircraft, eleven Royal Artillery (RA) pilots, 39 RA soldiers and 25 airmen (mostly maintenance technicians). The normal strength of an AOP squadron was 12 aircraft, 19 RA officers (all pilots), 83 RA other ranks and 63 RAF including two administrative officers. Aircraft were fitted with an Army No 22 Wireless, an HF set providing two-way voice communications with artillery units and formations on the ground.

On 31 March 1943 Army Cooperation Command was disbanded, most of its assets being used to form the Second Tactical Air Force. Four squadrons (651, 654 Squadron, 655 Squadron and 657 Squadron) fought in North Africa and Italy, being joined from August 1944 by 663 Polish squadron. The other seven RAF squadrons (Nos. 652, 653, 658, 659, 660, 661 and 662) operated after D-Day in France, the Low Countries and into Germany.

664 Squadron, 665 Squadron, and 666 Squadron RCAF were also issued with the Auster Mk. IV and V, formed at RAF Andover in late 1944 and early 1945. The RCAF squadrons were manned by Canadian personnel of the Royal Canadian Artillery and the RCAF, with brief secondment to the squadrons with pilots from the Royal Artillery; control was maintained in Britain by 70 Group, RAF Fighter Command. The three squadrons deployed from RAF Andover to the Netherlands, to Dunkirk in France, where the last Canadian 'shots' in Europe were fired and later to occupied Germany. 656 Squadron RAF was assigned to the Fourteenth Army and used Austers in Burma, generally with flights assigned to each corps. In the European theatre a squadron was generally assigned to each corps but under command for technical matters of an RAF group.

The 16 AOP Flight and 17 AOP Flight of the Royal Australian Air Force (RAAF) operated Auster Mark III aircraft in support of the Australian Army in the Pacific War from October 1944 until the end of the war.

Postwar Auster AOP aircraft were reorganised into independent flights (probably because the RAF used Wing-Commanders, equivalent to Lieutenant-Colonels, to command squadrons while the army insisted on Majors) including 1903 Flight in Korea that had artillery pilots from several Commonwealth countries. There was also an Auster-equipped 1913 Liaison Flight. Air OP flights also operated in the Malayan Emergency. Several AOP squadrons were reformed within the Royal Auxiliary Air Force in 1949 and these operated some AOP.5s, AOP.6s and AOP.9s until at least March 1957, when the Auxiliary Air Force was disbanded. All Auster AOP units were transferred to the Army Air Corps when it was formed in September 1957, with AAC squadrons using numbers starting with 651. The air observation duties, counter-insurgency and casualty evacuation performed by Auster and similar light aircraft were generally taken over by light helicopters from the mid-1960s.

Several Taylorcraft Austers formed, with other civil light aircraft, part of the initial equipment of the Sherut Avir, formed in November 1947 as the air component of the Jewish paramilitary organisation Haganah, which later became part of the Israeli Air Force. They were supplemented early in 1948 by six ex-RAF Austers that had been assembled from hulks of 25 aircraft purchased as scrap. These aircraft formed the core of Israel's air force in the early part of the 1947–1949 Palestine war, being used for reconnaissance and supply missions, while also being used to drop home-made bombs on Arab forces.

== Variants ==
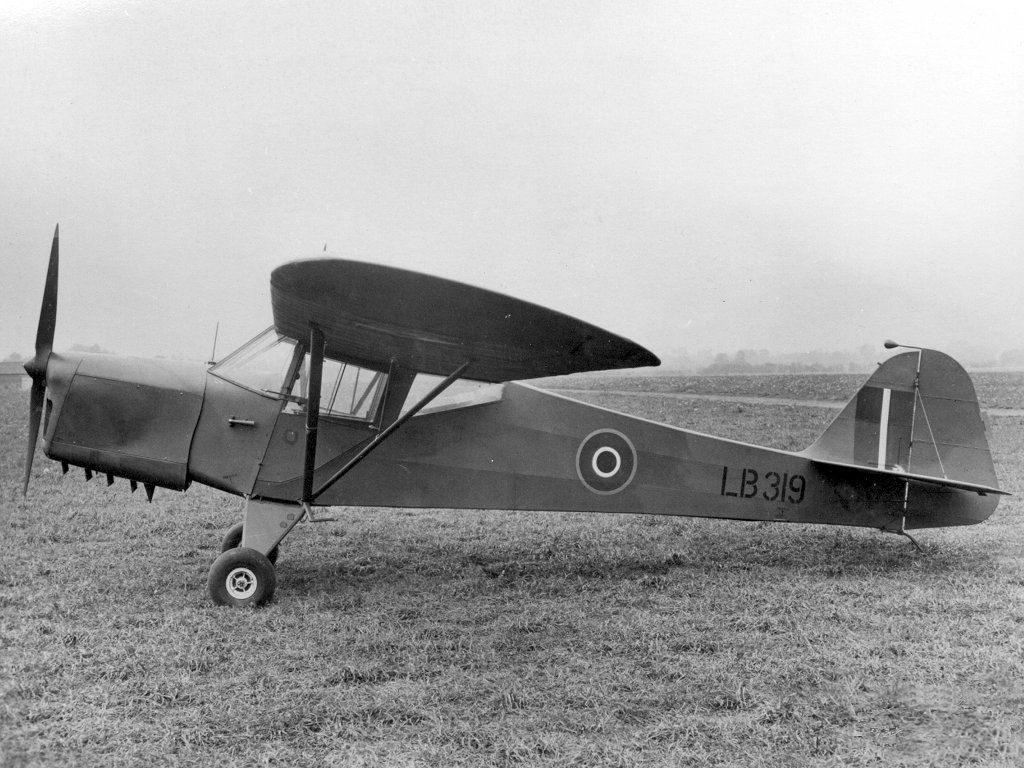
Auster III

Taylorcraft Plus C
Original civilian version with a Lycoming O-145-A2 engine, 23 built (one prototype and 22 production aircraft).
Taylorcraft Plus C2
Plus C re-engined with a 90 hp (67 kW) Cirrus Minor I engine for the Royal Air Force, 20 conversions.
Taylorcraft Plus D
Plus C with a 90hp Cirrus Minor I engine, nine built.
Taylorcraft Auster I
(Model D1) Military version of Plus C2, 100 built.
Taylorcraft Auster II
(Model F) Auster I with a Lycoming O-290 engine, two built, later converted to Auster IIIs
Taylorcraft Auster III
(Model E) Auster I with a de Havilland Gipsy Major engine, two prototypes converted from Model F (Auster I) and 467 built new.
Taylorcraft Auster IV
(Model G) Three-seat version with a Lycoming O-290-3/1 H.O. engine, 253 built.
Taylorcraft Auster V
(Model J) Auster IV with blind flying instruments (Vacuum pump) and flap modification, and removable armour plate installed for pilot only, 791 built.
Taylorcraft Auster Model H
Experimental tandem two-seat training glider converted from a Taylorcraft B.

== Operators ==
=== Military operators ===
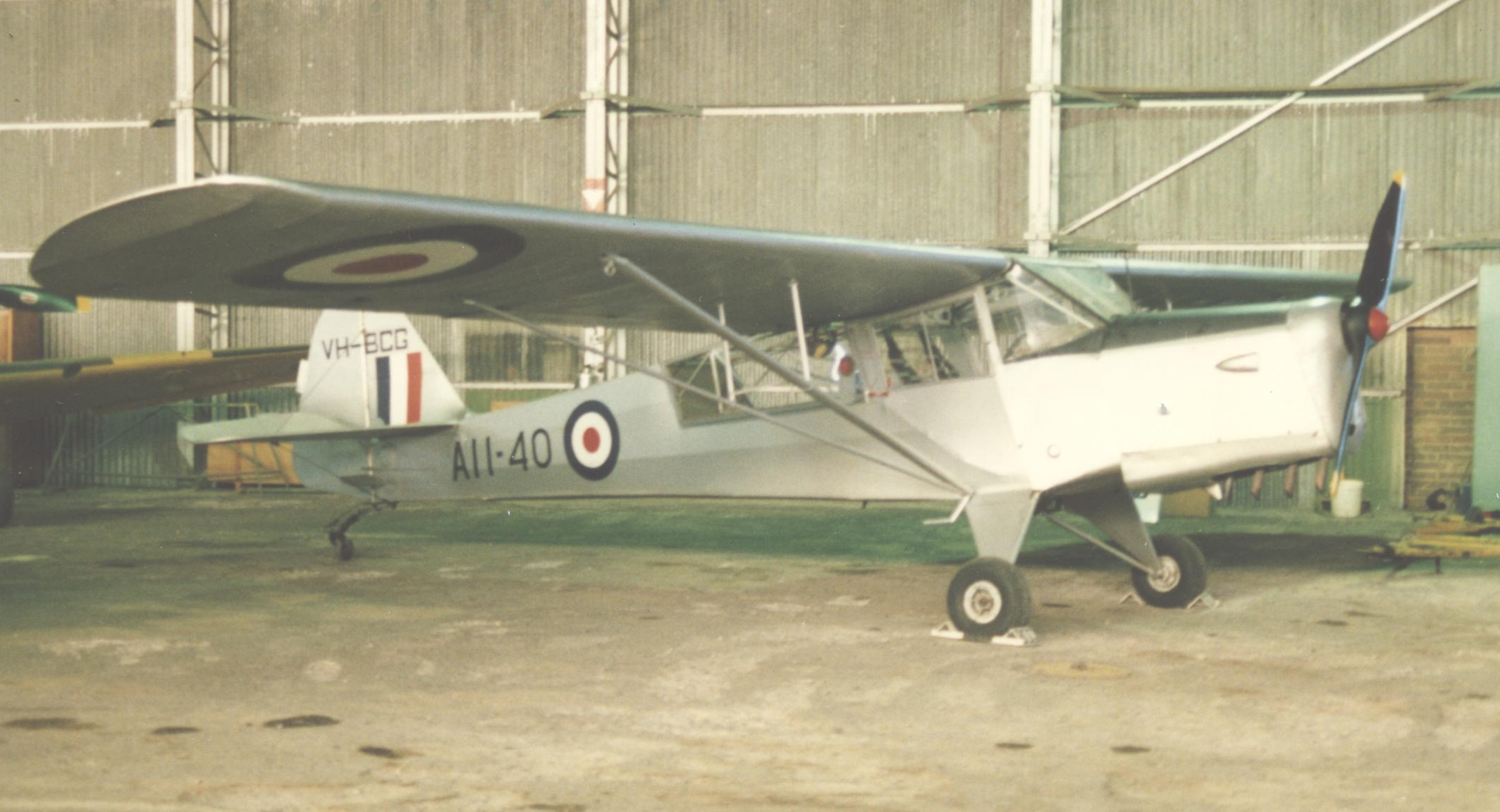
Auster III of the Royal Australian Air Force at the RAAF Museum, Point Cook, Victoria, in 1988

Australia

- Royal Australian Air Force 56 Auster IIIs
  - No. 2 Communications Unit RAAF
  - No. 16 air observation post Flight RAAF
  - No. 17 air observation post Flight RAAF
  - No. 3 Squadron RAAF
  - No. 77 Squadron RAAF
  - No. 454 Squadron RAAF
  - Aircraft Research and Development Unit RAAF
- Royal Australian Navy
  - 723 Squadron RAN
  - 724 Squadron RAN
  - 725 Squadron RAN

Burma

- Burma Air Force – Postwar

British Raj

- Royal Indian Air Force – Transferred to India and Pakistan post war

Canada

- Royal Canadian Air Force
  - No. 664 Squadron RCAF
  - No. 665 Squadron RCAF
  - No. 666 Squadron RCAF
- Canadian Army – Postwar

Czechoslovakia

- Czechoslovak Air Force – three Auster IIIs, in service from 1945 to 1948.

Greece

- Hellenic Air Force – postwar, 20 Auster IIIs

Hong Kong

- Royal Hong Kong Auxiliary Air Force – Postwar

India

- Indian Air Force – ex-RIAF aircraft postwar
- Indian Army – ex-IAF aircraft transferred

Israel

- Indonesian Air Force – ex-Dutch aircraft

Israel

- Israeli Air Force

Jordan (Transjordan)

- Arab Legion
- Royal Jordanian Air Force

Libya

- Libyan Air Force

Netherlands

- Royal Netherlands Air Force
- Royal Netherlands Navy
  - Dutch Naval Aviation Service
- Royal Netherlands East Indies Army Air Force – postwar

Norway

- Royal Norwegian Air Force in exile in the United Kingdom – Nine aircraft in service from 1944 to 1945. Used by Nos 331 and 332 Norwegian Squadrons as communications aircraft.

Pakistan

- Pakistan Air Force – postwar
- Pakistan Army – ex-Pakistan Air Force aircraft
  - Pakistan Army Aviation Corps

Poland

- Polish Air Force in exile in Great Britain
  - 663 Polski Szwadron Powietrznych Punktów Obserwacyjnych (1944–1946)

South Africa

- South African Air Force

United Kingdom

- British Army
  - Army Air Corps
- Royal Air Force

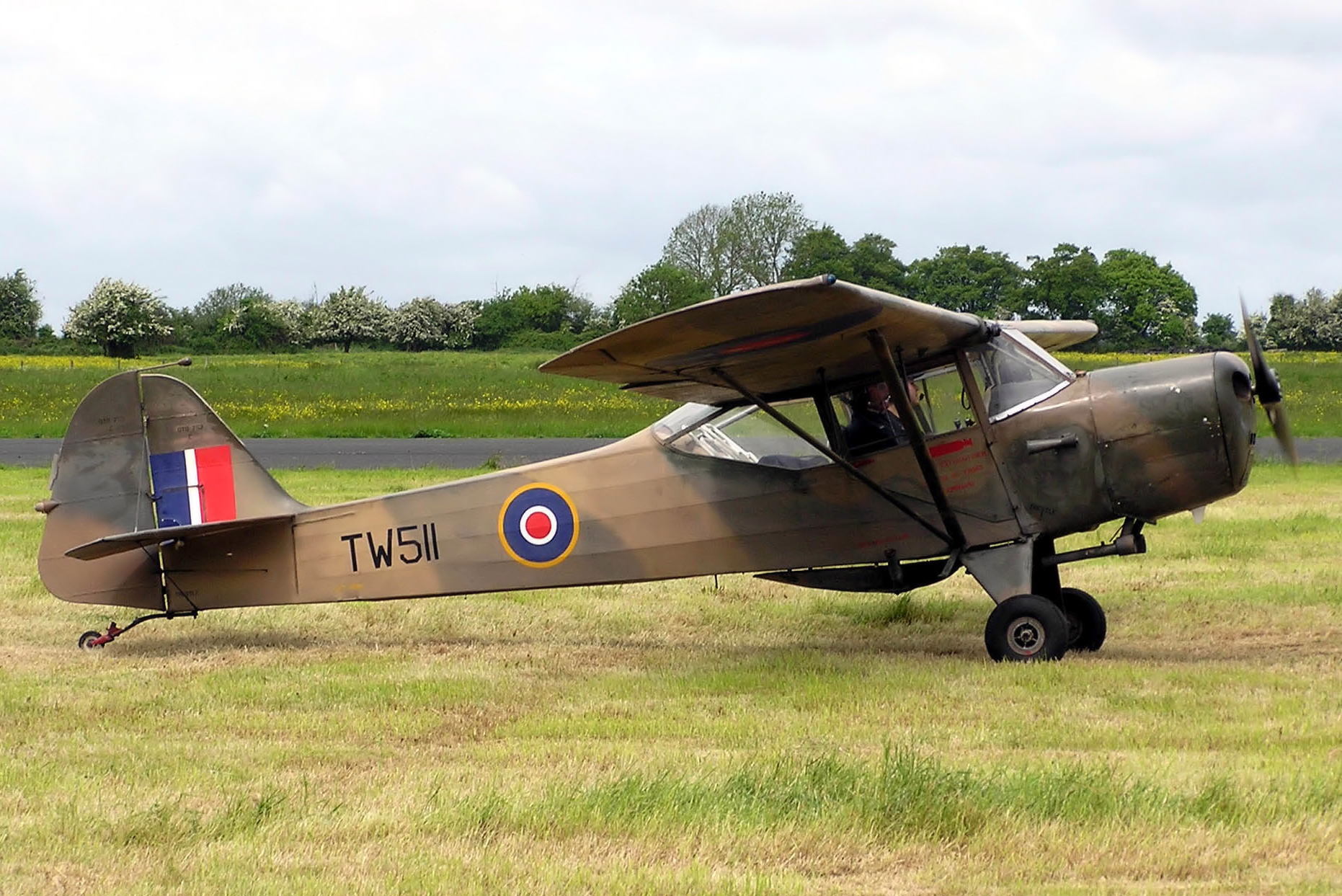
A Royal Air Force Auster warbird

  - No. 651 (AOP) Squadron RAF
  - No. 652 (AOP) Squadron RAF
  - No. 653 (AOP) Squadron RAF
  - No. 654 (AOP) Squadron RAF
  - No. 655 (AOP) Squadron RAF
  - No. 656 (AOP) Squadron RAF
  - No. 657 (AOP) Squadron RAF
  - No. 658 (AOP) Squadron RAF
  - No. 659 (AOP) Squadron RAF
  - No. 660 (AOP) Squadron RAF
  - No. 661 (AOP) Squadron RAF
  - No. 662 (AOP) Squadron RAF
  - No. 663 (AOP) Squadron RAF 1947–1949

== Surviving aircraft ==
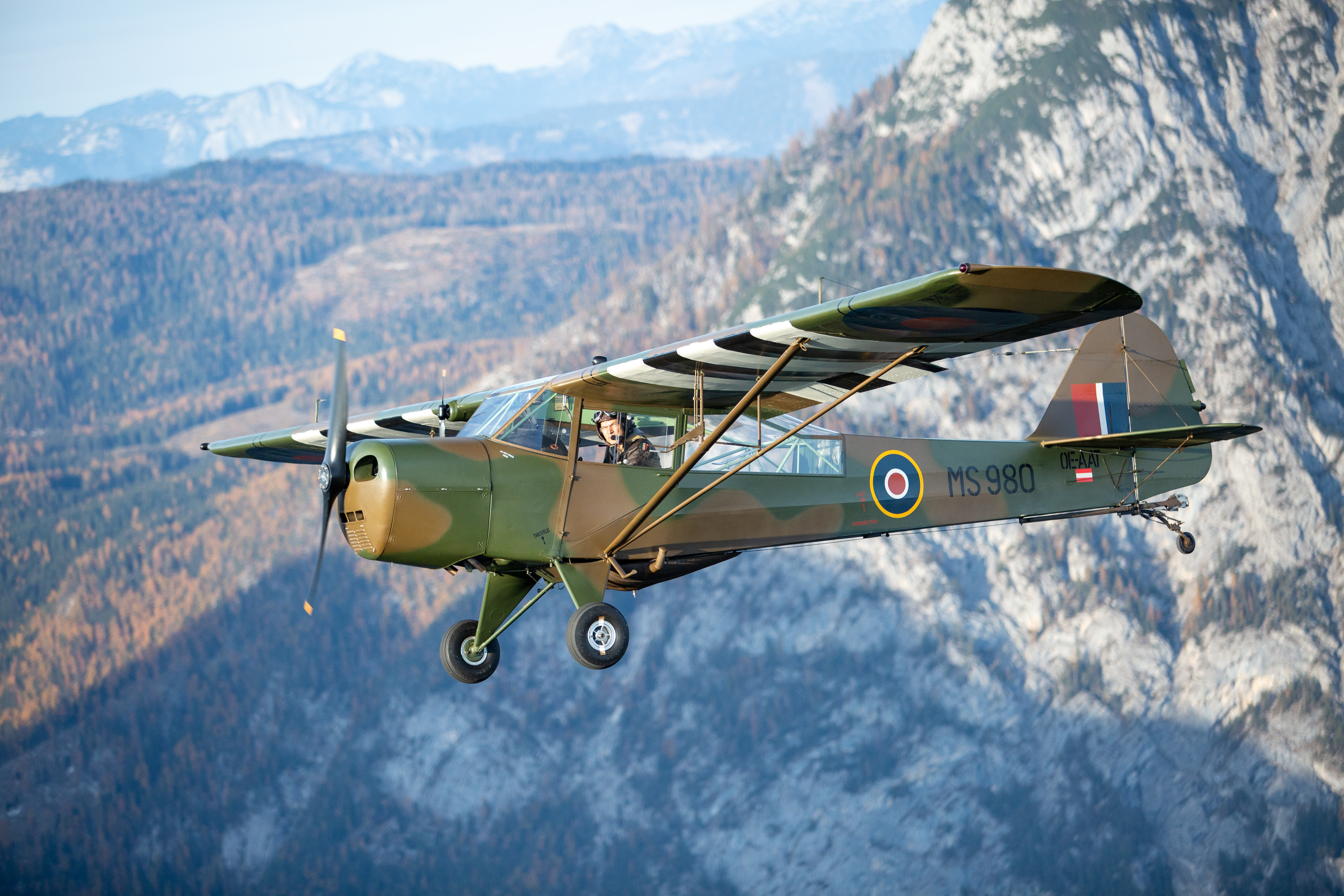
Auster Mk. V, MS980

=== Australia ===
- A11-17 – Auster Mk. III in storage at the RAAF Museum in Point Cook, Victoria.
- A11-34 – Auster Mk. III under restoration with Stuart Lee in Caboolture, Queensland.
- A11-41 – Auster Mk. III on static display at the Australian Army Flying Museum in Oakey, Queensland.
- A11-48 – Auster Mk. III under restoration with Ron Lee in Caboolture, Queensland.

=== Austria ===
- MS980 – Auster Mk. V under restoration to airworthy at Niederöblarn Airport in Niederöblarn, Styria.

=== Canada ===
- Auster Mk. V in storage at the Royal Canadian Artillery Museum in Sprucewoods, Manitoba.

=== Czech Republic ===
- TW384 – Auster Mk. V airworthy at Rakovnik Airport in Rakovník, Central Bohemia.

=== India ===
- IN959 – Auster Mk. V on static display at the School of Artillery in Deolali, Maharashtra.

=== Netherlands ===
- MZ231 – Auster Mk. III airworthy with the Koninklijke Luchtmacht Historische Vlucht in Gilze en Rijen, North Brabant.
- MZ236 – Auster in storage at the Nationaal Militair Museum in Soesterberg, Utrecht.
- NX537 – Auster Mk. III on static display at Museum Deelen in Deelen, Gelderland.

=== United Kingdom ===
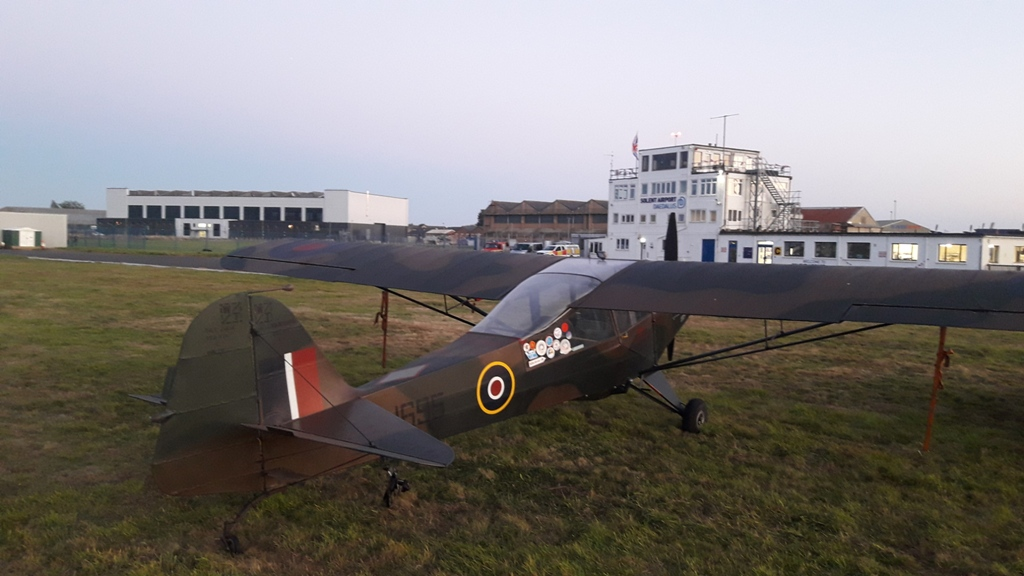
Auster Mk.IV NJ695 parked outside the WW2 control tower at Solent Airport

- LB264 – Auster Mk. I on static display at the Royal Air Force Museum London in London.
- LB312 – Auster Mk. I on display with the Historic Army Aircraft Flight in Middle Wallop, Hampshire.
- MT438 – Auster Mk. III airworthy with Richard Brian Webber in Chulmleigh, Devon.
- NJ695 – Auster Mk. IV airworthy at Solent Airport in Lee-on-the-Solent, Hampshire.
- RT486 – Auster Mk. V on static display at the RAF Manston History Museum in Ramsgate, Kent.

== Specifications (Auster V) ==
Data from British Warplanes of World War II and British Aircraft of World War II.

General characteristics

- Crew: 3
- Length: 22 ft 5 in (6.83 m)
- Wingspan: 36 ft 0 in (10.97 m)
- Height: 8 ft 0 in (2.44 m)
- Wing area: 167 sq ft (15.51 m^{2})
- Empty weight: 1,100 lb (499 kg)
- Max takeoff weight: 1,850 lb (839 kg)
- Powerplant: 1 × Lycoming O-290-3 flat-four piston, 130 hp (97 kW)

Performance

- Maximum speed: 113 kn (130 mph, 209 km/h)
- Stall speed: 28 kn (32 mph, 51 km/h)
- Range: 220 nmi (250 mi, 402 km) or 400 nmi (740 km; 460 mi) with long range tank fitted.
- Takeoff run: 91 ft (28 m)

== See also ==
Related development

- Auster AOP.6
- Taylorcraft B

Aircraft of comparable role, configuration, and era

- Fieseler Fi 156
- Piper Cub
- Polikarpov Po-2
- Stinson L-1 Vigilant
- Stinson L-5 Sentinel
- Taylorcraft L-2

Related lists

- List of aircraft of World War II
