= I3 =

I3, I-3 or i3 may refer to:

== Science and technology ==
- Core i3, a microprocessor line from Intel
- i3 (window manager), a tiling window manager
- Triiodide (I_{3}^{−}), an anion composed of 3 iodide atoms
- Intermud-3, an InterMUD network method between MUDs
- Axiom I3, a large cardinal axiom in rank-into-rank set theory

== Transport ==
- Interstate 3, a former proposed Interstate Highway in the U.S. states of Georgia and Tennessee
- BMW i3 (hatchback), an electric car by BMW
- Inline-triple engine, an internal combustion engine with three cylinders in a straight line
- LB&SCR I3 class, a British LB&SCR locomotive
- Circuito Norte (I–3), a Cuban highway going along the northern coast of the island
  - Vía Blanca (I–3), motorway from Havana to Varadero
  - Autopista Sur (I–3), motorway in Varadero
  - Autopista Havana–Mariel (I–3), motorway from Havana to Mariel

== Military ==
- Japanese submarine I-3, a Type J1 submarine of the Imperial Japanese Navy
- i3 fighter, a conceptual Japanese jet fighter proposed in 2010
- Mikoyan-Gurevich I-3, a heavy interceptor prototype fighter of the 1950s
- Polikarpov I-3, a 1928 Soviet biplane fighter

== See also ==
- 3I (disambiguation)
