= 7 (Training) Regiment Army Air Corps =

- Active: c. 1969 – present
- Country: United Kingdom
- Branch: British Army
- Type: Aviation
- Role: Training
- Size: Regiment
- Part of: Joint Aviation Command
- Base: Middle Wallop Flying Station

7 (Training) Regiment Army Air Corps is a regiment of the British Army under Joint Aviation Command. The regiment is responsible for providing all of the flight training of Army Air Corps (AAC) pilots. The regiment is based at the Army Aviation Centre at Middle Wallop.

== Structure ==
The regiment consists of three squadrons:

- No. 653 Squadron AAC conducts the Conversion to Role training on the AH-64E Apache attack helicopter.
- No. 673 Squadron AAC conducts Conversion to Type training on the AH-64E Apache attack helicopter for both newly qualified and experienced Army pilots.

=== Former ===
- No. 25 Flight AAC was based at Nanyuki in Kenya and was responsible for providing 24/7 medical evacuation and range clearances for the British Army Training Unit Kenya until 2015.

== History ==
7 Army Aviation Regiment was formed c. 1969 at Airfield Camp, Netheravon. In 1971, the regiment was renamed to 7 Regiment Army Air Corps. During its time as a regular unit, the following squadrons and flights were part of the regiment: 651 Squadron, 658 Squadron, 2 Flight and 8 Flight. 658 Squadron had reformed c. 1982. The Agusta A109A helicopter had entered service with 8 Flight in 1984. 666 (V) Squadron had become part of the regiment in 1986.

In April 1995, the regiment re-roled as a volunteer unit 7 Regiment AAC (V). The regiment consisted of 666 Squadron (V), 658 Squadron (V), 3 Flight (V) at RAF Turnhouse (later RAF Leuchars) and 6 Flight (V) based at Shawbury.

On 1 April 2009, the regiment re-roled as a regular training unit 7 (Training) Regiment AAC based at Middle Wallop as part of the School of Army Aviation. On 1 August 2009, the school was renamed as the Army Aviation Centre. The regiment consisted of 670 Squadron, 671 Squadron and 673 Squadron.
