= No. 655 Squadron RAF =

- Active: 30 November 1942 – 31 August 1945
- Country: United Kingdom
- Branch: Royal Air Force
- Role: Air observation post squadron

Insignia
- Squadron badge heraldry: No badge known
- Squadron codes: PA (1944 – August 1945, HQ Flight); PB (1944 – August 1945, 'A' Flight); PC (1944 – August 1945, 'B' Flight); PD (1944 – August 1945, 'C' Flight)

Aircraft flown
- Reconnaissance: Taylorcraft Auster

No. 655 Squadron RAF was a unit of the Royal Air Force during the Second World War. Numbers 651 to 663 Squadrons of the RAF were air observation post units working closely with Army units in artillery spotting and liaison. A further three of these squadrons, 664–666, were composed of Canadian personnel. Their duties and squadron numbers were transferred to the Army with the formation of the Army Air Corps on 1 September 1957.

== History ==
No. 655 Squadron was formed at RAF Old Sarum, Wiltshire, on 30 November 1942 and went into action in August 1943 in North Africa. From December 1943, it served in Italy, where it remained until disbanding at Ronchi on 31 August 1945. Colonel Sir Richard Gorham earned the Distinguished Flying Cross while a flight commander in Italy, playing a decisive role in the Battle of Monte Cassino. 655 Avn. Sqn. Army Air Corps was the 1st (BR) Corps support Squadron at Detmold in West Germany, during the days of the British Army of the Rhine. 655 Sqn., (The Scottish Horse), a title used to remember the unit's connections with its R.A.F. precedents, and the Italian campaign, provided battlefield support, observation, casevac, and Anti Tank Guided Weapon operations in the forward area in the event of the then expected European War. As in common with all A.A.C. units at that time 655 Squadron operated Westland upgraded Bell 47 G4 and Westland 'Scout'AH Mk'1 Helicopters.

== Aircraft operated ==
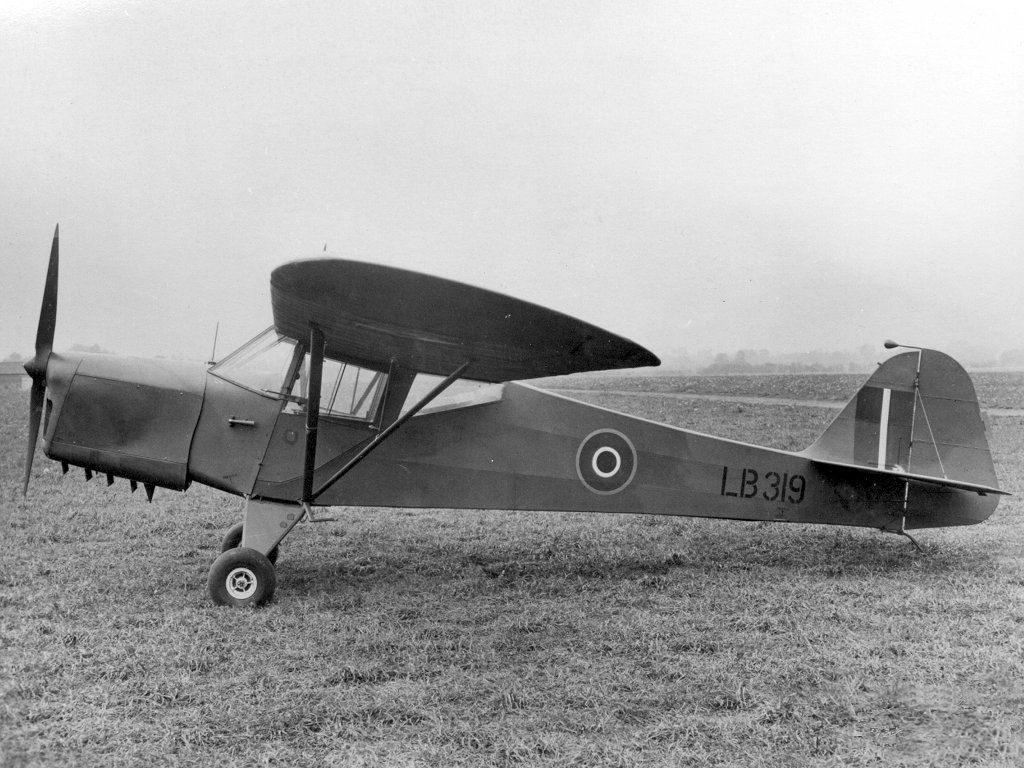
An Auster Mk.III.

Aircraft operated by no. 655 Squadron RAF, data from
From	To	Aircraft	Variant
December 1942	February 1943	Auster	Mk.I
February 1943	August 1944	Auster	Mk.III
June 1944	August 1945	Auster	Mk.IV
January 1945	August 1945	Auster	Mk.V

== See also ==
- List of Royal Air Force aircraft squadrons
- No. 679 (The Duke of Connaught's) Squadron AAC
