= Iniziative Industriali Italiane =

Iniziative Industriali Italiane or 3I is an Italian aircraft manufacturing company that was originally formed as Meteor S.p.A.. In 1947, a group of pilots founded Meteor S.p.A. in Trieste, Italy. Meteor's aim was to re-open Trieste airport, which had been destroyed in World War II. Meteor S.p.A. gained the licence from the Italian Government to rebuild what is now the Trieste International Airport.

Meteor S.p.A. initially began by repairing surplus aircraft from the American Air Force, such as the three-seater Austers and the four-seater Fairchilds. During this same time a number of gliders were built: The MS-18 Falco, a single-seat trainer; the MS-21 Gabbiano, a two-seater trainer; the MS-30 Passero, a metal single-seat manufactured as a joint venture with Scheibe and the Canguro; and a two-seat competition glider, which has won significant records for altitude and distance over many years.

3I entered bankruptcy proceedings in 2008 and in 2012 the 3I Sky Arrow design was purchased by Magnaghi Aeronautica, of Naples, Italy.
