= Netheravon Airfield =

Ministry of Defence grass strip airfield on Salisbury Plain in Wiltshire, England

- Netheravon, Wiltshire in England
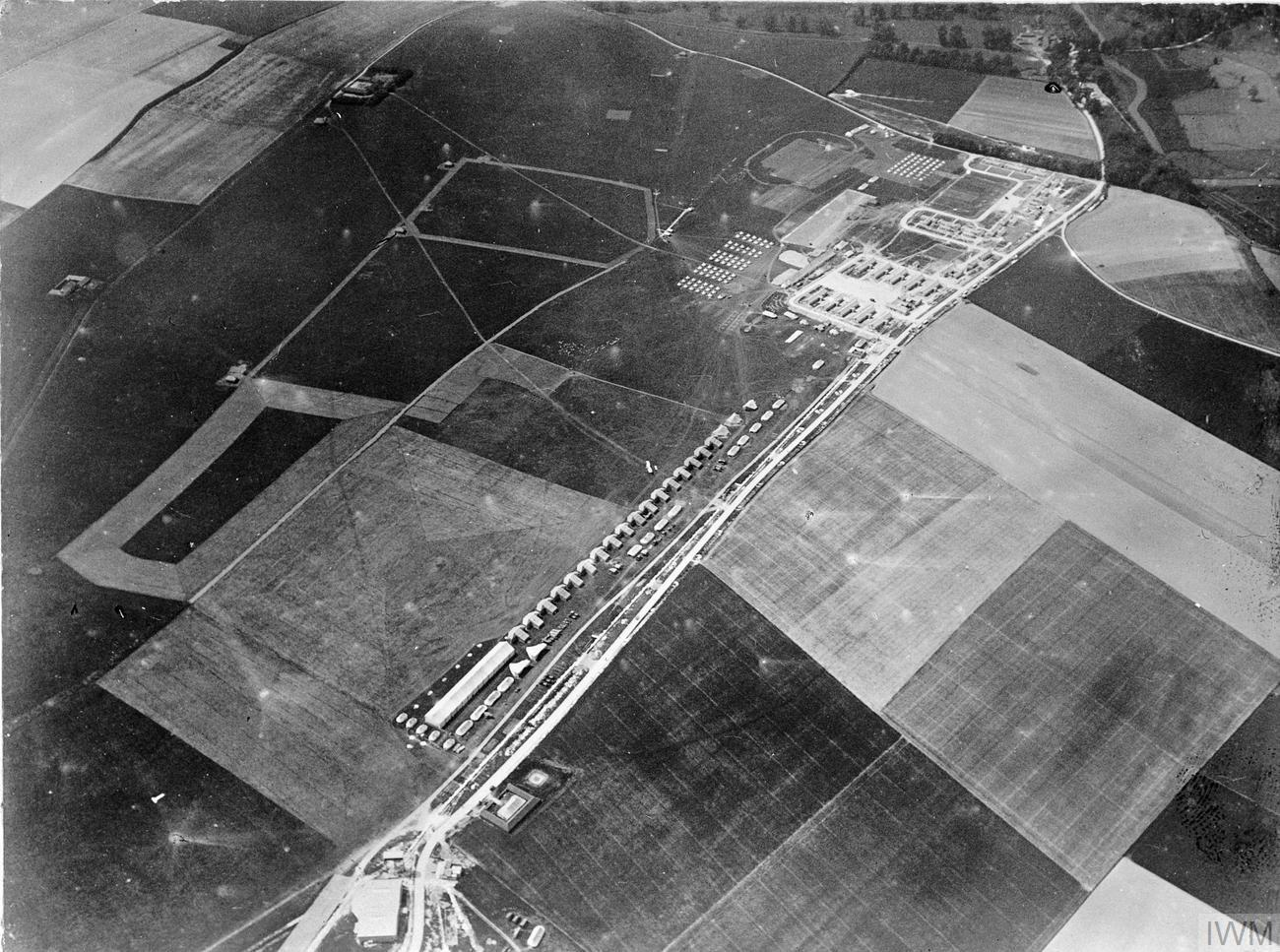
- "Concentration Camp" at RFC Netheravon, June 1914

Site information
- Owner: Ministry of Defence
- Controlled by: Army Air Corps

Location
- Shown within Wiltshire
- Coordinates: 51°14′43″N 1°45′32″W

Site history
- Built: 1912
- In use: 1912 – present

Airfield information
- Identifiers: ICAO: EGDN

Netheravon Airfield is a Ministry of Defence grass strip airfield on Salisbury Plain, in Wiltshire, England. Established in 1913 by the Royal Flying Corps, it became RAF Netheravon from 1918 until 1963, then AAC Netheravon (Army Air Corps) until 2012. Buildings from 1913 and 1914 survive on part of the site. The site forms part of the Tidworth, Netheravon and Bulford (TidNBul) Garrison.

== Location ==
The airfield lies on Salisbury Plain, mostly in Fittleton parish, extending south into Figheldean. It is close to Netheravon village and about 5 miles (8 km) north of the town of Amesbury.

Its buildings are on two sites. Technical buildings, including as the control tower and hangars, are immediately southwest of the runways. About 1 mile (2 km) further southwest, towards Netheravon, is Airfield Camp (also known as Lower Camp) which has offices, a training school (the Airmen's Institute), an Officers' Mess and barracks.

The Ministry of Defence land which surrounds the site is part of the Salisbury Plain Training Area.

== Royal Flying Corps, 1912–1918 ==
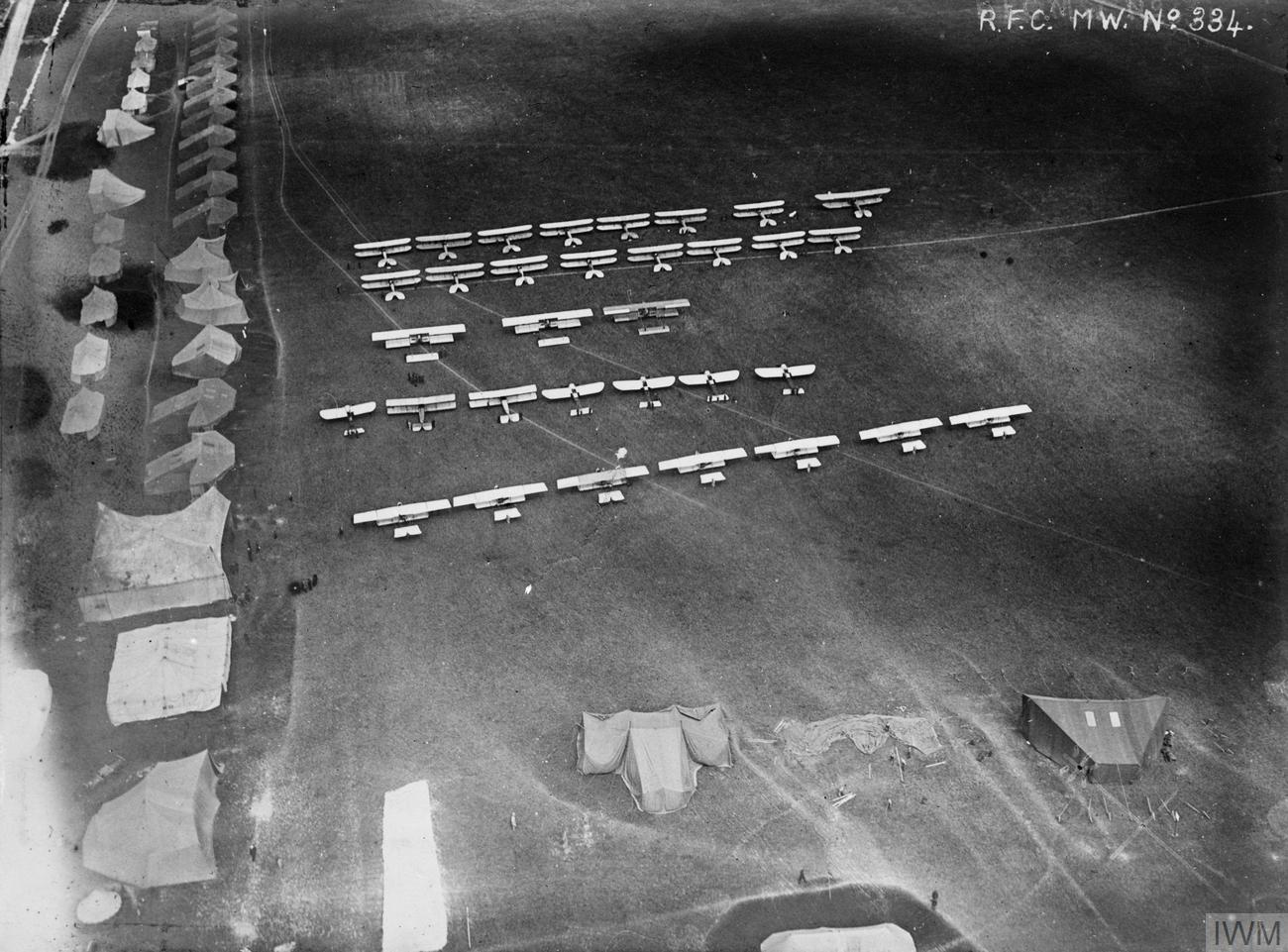
RFC aircraft and tents at Netheravon, June 1914

Much farmland in the area was bought by the War Office around 1898 for military training. Along with nearby Upavon and Larkhill, the airfield was part of the formative phase of military flying. The Royal Flying Corps was established in April 1912; in May its Central Flying School was formed at Upavon, and its Military Wing was formed from the Air Battalion, which flew aircraft at Larkhill.

The Netheravon site near Choulston Farm was selected towards the end of 1912, and at first was called Choulston Camp. The airfield used a road which extended from Netheravon across farmland, to serve two 19th-century groups of farm buildings. Until the site was ready, service personnel were housed in tents or at the former cavalry school at Netheravon House, south of Netheravon village. Standardised designs and prefabricated methods helped construction to proceed quickly, and No. 3 Squadron moved here in June 1913, followed soon after by No. 4 Squadron RFC.

In June 1914, under the leadership of Lt Col (later Air Vice Marshal) F H Sykes, the airfield was the site of a gathering of RFC men and machines. Known as the Netheravon Concentration Camp, the exercise was designed to test mobilisation and improve the RFC's public reputation, as well as providing training. Flight magazine reported "upwards of 700 officers and men" and published photographs showing lines of tents for the visiting squadrons.

In August, following the declaration of war, 3 and 4 squadrons left for France to support the British Expeditionary Force. They were replaced by No. 1 Squadron which had a training role. Netheravon became a forming-up point for new squadrons; an example is No. 11 Squadron, formed here in February 1915 and deployed to France in July. It was also the home of No. 8 Training Depot Station which trained aircrew, groundcrew, specialist signallers and fitters.

== Royal Air Force, 1918–1963 ==
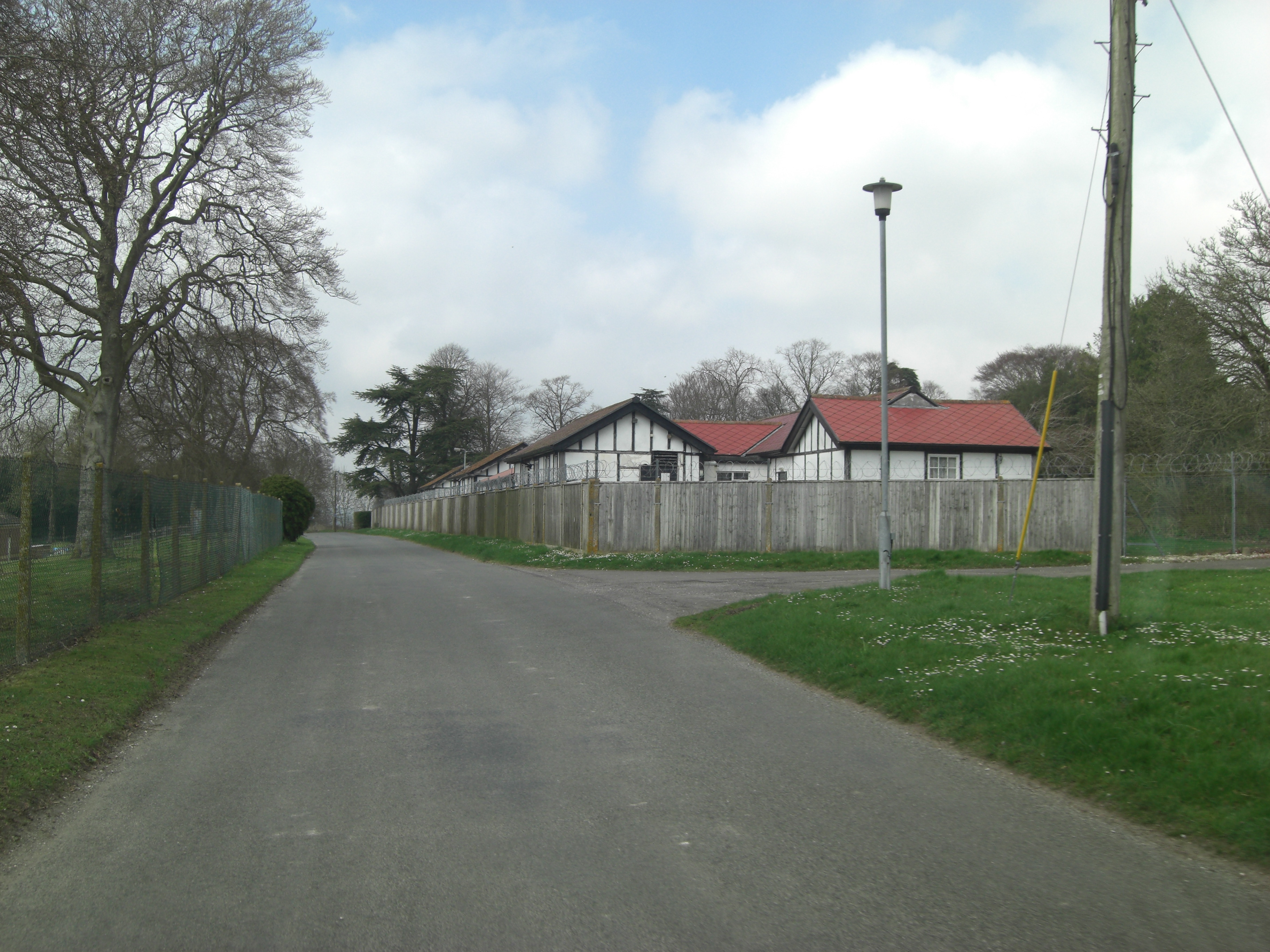
Part of the officers' quarters at Airfield Camp

After the war, now a station of the newly formed Royal Air Force, Netheravon was used for disbandment of squadrons. A range of hangars was built in 1918 to house Handley Page O/400 bombers, but plans to develop Netheravon as a bomber base were soon shelved. From 1919 until 1931 it was the home of No. 1 Flying Training School; between 1924 and 1928, trainees included crews for the newly created Fleet Air Arm. Training resumed in 1935 under No. 6 Flying Training School RAF, which left for Little Rissington in 1938 and was replaced by a new incarnation of No. 1 FTS, renamed to No. 1 Service Flying Training School in 1939.

In the 1939-45 war, Netheravon saw short stays by various squadrons, while training activities continued. In 1941 training of Fleet Air Arm aircrew relocated to the United States. Squadrons based at Netheravon included 297 (from December 1941), 296 (January 1942) and 295 (August 1942). In 1944 the airfield was used to prepare gliders for their role in the invasion of Normandy.

After the war, the site was used for various purposes, including RAF Police training. Additional married quarters were built at Airfield Camp in the 1950s, and c. 1952 a Roman Catholic church was opened there.

== Army Air Corps, 1964–2012 ==
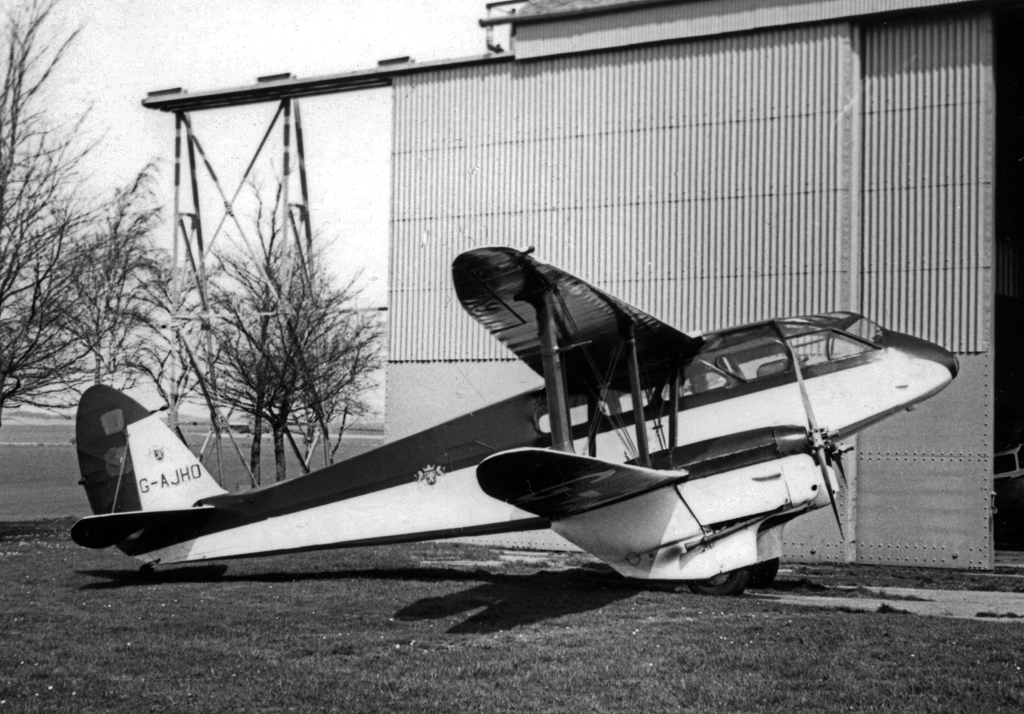
DH.89A Dragon Rapide G-AJHO of the Army Parachute Association at Netheravon, 1968

The site was transferred to the Army Air Corps in 1963 and became AAC Netheravon. No. 651 Squadron moved here in 1964 and had responsibility for Army aviation in the UK (other than at Middle Wallop) and the Middle East. 7 Army Aviation Regiment was formed c. 1969 at Netheravon and in 1971 the regiment was renamed to 7 Regiment Army Aviation Corps. In 1995, 7 Regiment re-roled as a volunteer Territorial Army regiment. 7 Regiment moved to Middle Wallop in 2009.

For some years until 2011, when it moved to Staff College, Camberley, the headquarters of the Brigade of Gurkhas was housed at Airfield Camp.

Karen Spence, a 23-year-old student, died on Sunday 14 June 1987 after parachuting from 7,000 ft. It was her 68th jump, and the parachute did not deploy.

== Today ==
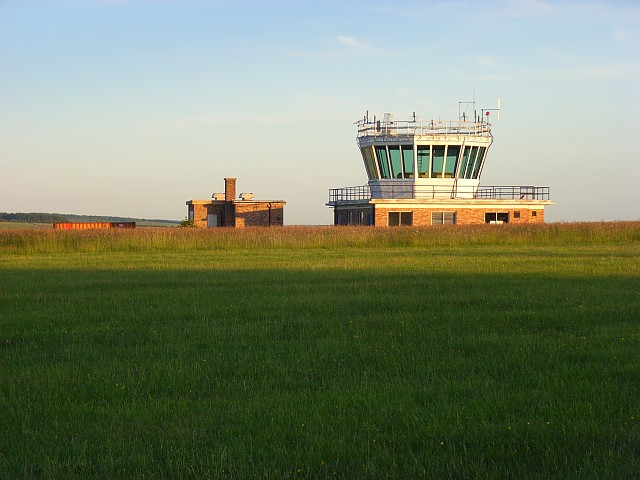
Control tower in 2007

The airfield is used by the Joint Services Parachute Centre, part of the Army's "Adventurous Training" programme for serving and injured personnel, and is home to the Army Parachute Association, a charity which supports sports parachuting for serving and retired personnel.

== Listed buildings ==
The Officers' Mess and quarters at Airfield Camp, completed in 1914, are Grade II* listed. The Mess is partly two-storey, while the linked accommodation block and the nine detached four-room chalets are single-storey. Construction is softwood framing with asbestos-cement panels, their joints covered with painted wood strips, under a tiled roof. Historic England describe the group of buildings as "of outstanding historical interest, and of striking architectural form, comprising some of the earliest extant buildings erected for the RFC".

Six further buildings from the same phase, and a range of five linked hangars from 1918, are Grade II listed. At the site near the airfield, the 1914 Main Depot Offices, in the same style as the Camp buildings, are also Grade II.

== Units ==
The following units have been based at Netheravon.

=== First World War ===
- No. 1 Squadron RAF
- No. 3 Squadron RAF
- No. 4 Squadron RAF
- No. 7 Squadron RAF
- No. 10 Squadron RAF
- No. 11 Squadron RAF
- No. 12 Squadron RAF
- No. 19 Squadron RAF
- No. 20 Squadron RAF
- No. 21 Squadron RAF
- No. 26 Squadron RAF
- No. 32 Squadron RAF
- No. 42 Squadron RAF
- No. 43 Squadron RAF
- No. 48 Squadron RAF
- No. 66 Squadron RAF
- No. 72 Squadron RAF
- No. 97 Squadron RAF
- No. 115 Squadron RAF
- No. 207 Squadron RAF
- No. 215 Squadron RAF
- No. 3 Reserve Aeroplane Squadron
- No. 7 Reserve Aeroplane Squadron
- No. 7 Reserve Squadron
- No. 7 Training Squadron
- No. 8 Reserve Aeroplane Squadron
- No. 8 Reserve Squadron
- No. 12 Training Depot Station
- No. 59 Training Squadron
- 104th Aero Squadron
- No. 70 Training Squadron
- No. 71 Training Squadron
- No. 74 Training Squadron
- No. 92 (Canadian) Reserve Squadron

=== Inter-war years ===
- No. 13 Squadron RAF
- No. 33 Squadron RAF
- No. 35 Squadron RAF
- No. 52 Squadron RAF
- No. 57 Squadron RAF
- No. 99 Squadron RAF
- No. 142 Squadron RAF
- No. 208 Squadron RAF

=== Second World War ===
- No. 295 Squadron RAF
- No. 296 Squadron RAF
- No. 297 Squadron RAF
- No. 38 Wing RAF
- No. 38 Group Communication Flight RAF.
- Air Transport Tactical Development Unit RAF
- Transport Command Development Unit RAF
- Transport Support Practice Camp RAF
- Operational and Refresher Training Unit RAF
- School of Air Transport RAF

=== Post-war ===
- No. 187 Squadron RAF
- VISTRE Flight

=== Army Air Corps ===
- No. 653 Squadron AAC
- No. 656 Squadron AAC
- No. 658 Squadron AAC
- No. 663 Squadron AAC
- No. 666 Squadron AAC

=== Others ===
The following units were based at Netheravon at some point:

- 800 Naval Air Squadron
- 801 Naval Air Squadron
- 802 Naval Air Squadron
- 803 Naval Air Squadron
- 822 Naval Air Squadron
- No. 1 Heavy Glider Maintenance Unit RAF
- No. 2 Flight AAC
- No. 235 Maintenance Unit RAF
- No. 1333 Transport Support Training Unit RAF
- No. 1677 (Target Towing) Flight RAF
- No. 2779 Squadron RAF Regiment
- No. 2786 Squadron RAF Regiment
- No. 2952 Squadron RAF Regiment
- Heavy Glider Maintenance Unit RAF
- Joint Services Parachuting Centre
- Royal Artillery Aero Club
- Southern Command (AGA) Gliding Club
