= No. 665 Squadron RCAF =

No. 665 Squadron Royal Canadian Air Force
- Active: 22 January 1945 – 10 July 1945
- Country: Canada
- Branch: Royal Canadian Air Force and Royal Canadian Artillery
- Role: Air Observation/Radio Intelligence Gathering
- Part of: No. 84 Group RAF, Second Tactical Air Force
- Battle honours: France and Germany 1945

Commanders
- Notable commanders: Major Dave Ely; Captain G. A. Eaton, MC; Major Norbert Reilander

Insignia
- Squadron Badge heraldry: No badge authorised
- Squadron Codes: No code(s) known to have been used by this squadron

Aircraft flown
- Reconnaissance: Auster Mk.V

No. 665 "Air Observation Post" Squadron, RCAF was formed in England during the Second World War. It was manned principally by Royal Canadian Artillery (RCA) and Royal Canadian Air Force (RCAF) personnel, with select British artillery pilots briefly seconded to assist in squadron formation. Numbers 651 to 663 Squadrons of the RAF were air observation post units working closely with Army units in artillery spotting and liaison. A further three of these squadrons – Nos. 664, 665 and 666 – were RCAF AOP squadrons manned by Canadian and British personnel.

== History ==
=== Formation ===
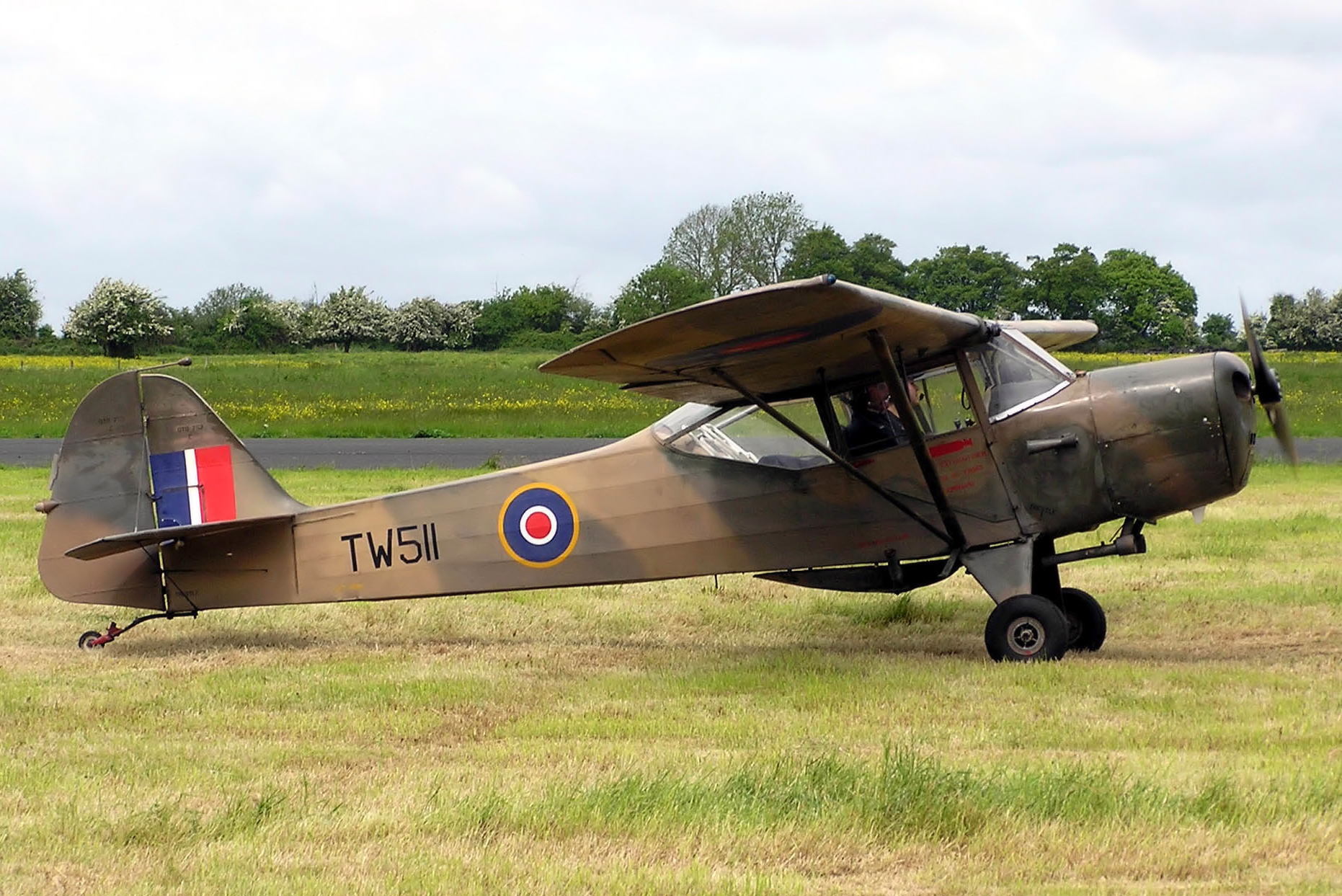
A postwar Auster Mk.V, restored in wartime colours

The squadron was formed on 22 January 1945 at RAF Andover as an RCAF unit – albeit not in the 'Article XI' sequence of squadron numbers, but in a 'normal' British sequence – its principal role being to direct artillery fire from the air. The pilots were officers recruited from the Royal Canadian Artillery and trained to fly at 22 E.F.T.S. (Elementary Flying Training School) Cambridge, further developing advanced flying skills at No. 43 Operational Training Unit RAF (43 OTU), RAF Andover. The first commanding officer was Major Dave Ely, RCA. The operational commanding officer selected to take the squadron to war was Captain G.A. 'Tony' Eaton, MC, RCA; Eaton was killed in a flying mishap near RAF Middle Wallop on the night of 1 March 1945. Major Norbert Reilander, RCA, from No. 664 Squadron RCAF, was chosen to take command of 665 Squadron in the first week of March 1945. The squadron operated in England under the overall control of No. 70 Group, RAF Fighter Command; prior to deployment to the European continent the squadron was transferred to No. 84 Group, RAF Second Tactical Air Force (2 TAF).

=== On operations ===
The squadron began deploying to the Netherlands on 19 April, arriving at B-77 Gilze-Rijen airport on 21 April 1945. The principal aircraft flown in action was the Taylorcraft Auster Mk.V. 'B' Flight of 665 (AOP) Squadron, RCAF, was credited with firing the last Canadian shot of the war in Europe at Dunkirk, France, on 7 May 1945. After V-E Day on 8 May 1945, the squadron was tasked with flying mail and passengers for First Canadian Army, while one section and its aircraft was seconded to Allied Headquarters at Frankfurt, Germany, for U.S. Intelligence duties. No. 665 (AOP) Squadron, RCAF, was disbanded at 'JOE' airfield, Apeldoorn, the Netherlands, on 10 July 1945. The squadron had no official motto or heraldic badge assigned to it.

The squadron was reformed as unit of the British Army's Army Air Corps on 1 October 1969 called 665 Aviation Squadron AAC.

=== Aircrew or not? ===
Formation of the three Canadian war-time AOP squadrons was historically the first example of 'unification of services,' a generation before the Canadian Forces experienced total unification. These, however, were not 'co-operation squadrons.' Although 665 squadron's trained aircrew observers acquitted themselves admirably in aerial action against the enemy, aircrew associations across Canada did not grant membership to AOP observers, as those aircrew were not officially issued with cloth wings during the war.
