= 3I Sky Arrow =

Italian light sport aircraft

Sky Arrow
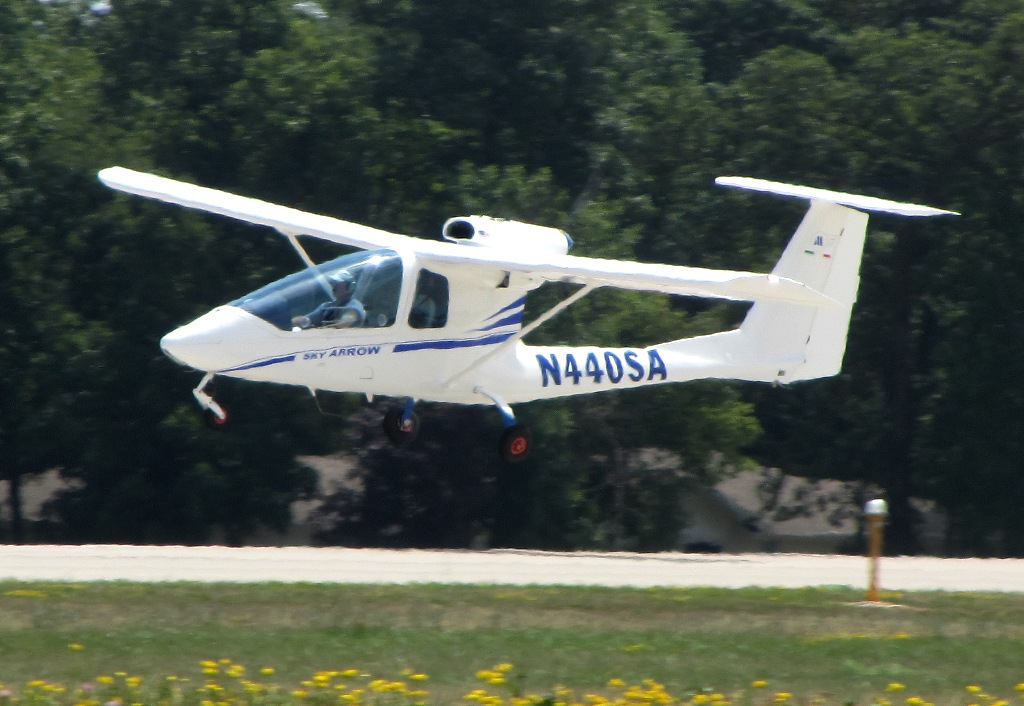

General information
- Type: Recreational aircraft
- Manufacturer: Iniziative Industriali Italiane/3I, Magnaghi Aeronautica

History
- First flight: 13 July 1992

The Sky Arrow is a tandem two-seat, high-wing pusher light aircraft that was manufactured by 3I (Iniziative Industriali Italiane).

3I entered bankruptcy proceedings in 2008, and in 2012 the design was purchased by Magnaghi Aeronautica, of Naples, Italy.

== Design and development ==
Magnaghi Aeronautica, the new owners of the design in 2012, announced that it will be upgraded with larger wing tanks, improved aerodynamics and stability, strengthened structural elements and a new avionics package. The Sky Arrow will be available as a completed certified aircraft for light sport or as a kit. A four-seat version is planned. Magnaghi Aeronautica expects to market it for government utility roles, such as border patrol, pollution monitoring and aerial surveillance, with belly- and nose-mounted sensors.

The 3I Sky Arrow 600 Sport and the Magnaghi Aeronautica Sky Arrow LSA are both US Federal Aviation Administration approved special light-sport aircraft. The company completed FAR 23 type certification for the Sky Arrow TCNS.

== Variants ==
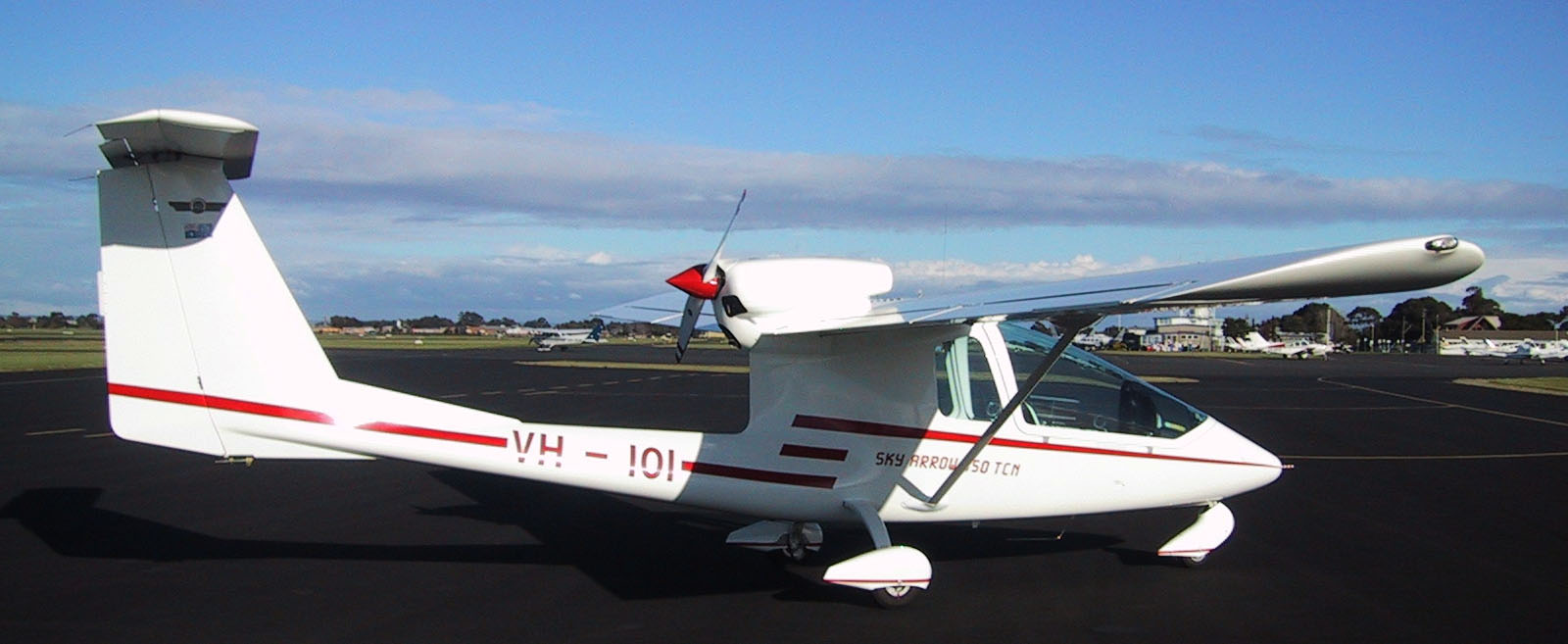
A Sky Arrow 650 TCN

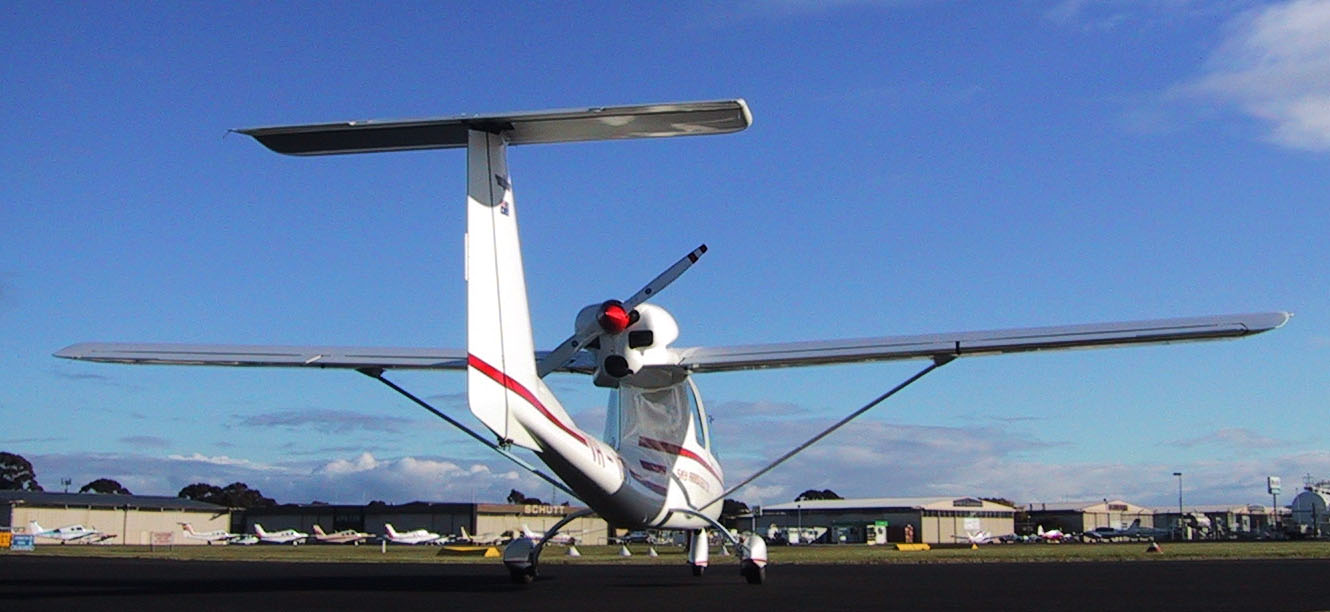
The rear of the Sky Arrow 650 TCN, showing its pusher propeller.

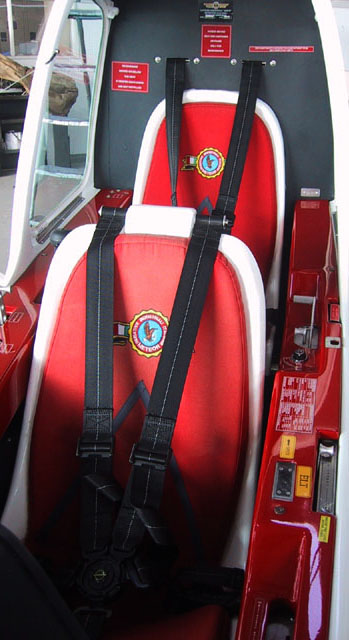
The seating of the Sky Arrow 650 TCN

- Sky Arrow LSA
- Sky Arrow Sport (100 hp (75 kW))

Meets ATSM requirements for the FAA Light-Sport category of aircraft.

- Sky Arrow 1450L (100 hp (75 kW)/115 hp (86 kW))

kitplane version, meets FAA 51 per cent builder rule.

- Sky Arrow 650 TCN
- Sky Arrow 650 TC
- Sky Arrow 650 TCNS
- Sky Arrow 650 TCS:

(100 hp engine), VFR and Sky Arrow 650 TCNS for VFR Night - Maximum Takeoff Weight (MTOW) of 650 kg (1,430 lb)

- Sky Arrow 710 RG:

100 hp engine, C for VFR and CN for VFR Night with an increased MTOW of 710 kg (1,570 lb) and retractable landing gear

- Sky Arrow 710 PLUS:

100 hp engine, C and CN with an increased MTOW of 710 kg (1,570 lb) and fixed landing gear

- Sky Arrow 650 ERA:

fitted with RAWAS instrumentation by the Atmospheric Turbulence Diffusion Division of the National Oceanic Atmospheric Administration and Iniziative Industriali Italiane, for use in territory control environmental monitoring and for scientific research purposes.

== Specifications (650) ==
Data from Giotto Air

General characteristics

- Crew: One, pilot
- Capacity: One passenger
- Length: 7.60 m (24 ft 11 in)
- Wingspan: 9.68 m (31 ft 9 in)
- Height: 2.56 m (8 ft 5 in)
- Wing area: 13.5 m^{2} (145 sq ft)
- Gross weight: 650 kg (1,433 lb)
- Useful load: 250kg (556 lbs)
- Powerplant: 1 × Rotax 912 F2 , 73.5 kW (98.6 hp)

Performance

- Maximum speed: 194 km/h (121 mph, 105 kn)
- Cruise speed: 187 km/h (116 mph, 101 kn)
- Service ceiling: 4,100 m (13,500 ft)
- Rate of climb: 4.3 m/s (840 ft/min)
