= No. 664 Squadron RCAF =

- Active: 9 December 1944 – 31 May 1946
- Country: Canada
- Allegiance: Canada
- Branch: Royal Canadian Air Force and Royal Canadian Artillery
- Role: Air Observation/Radio Intelligence Gathering
- Part of: RAF Fighter Command; No. 84 Group, Second Tactical Air Force
- Battle honours: France and Germany 1945

Commanders
- Notable commanders: Major D. Ely, Major D.W. Blyth

Insignia
- Squadron Codes: AW (Dec 194ا4 – May 1946)

Aircraft flown
- Reconnaissance: Auster Mks.IV & V

No. 664 "Air Observation Post" Squadron RCAF was formed in England during the Second World War. It was manned principally by Royal Canadian Artillery (RCA) and Royal Canadian Air Force (RCAF) personnel, with select British artillery pilots briefly seconded to assist in squadron formation.

== History ==
The squadron was formed on 9 December 1944, at RAF Andover, its principal role being to direct artillery fire from the air. The pilots were officers recruited from the Royal Canadian Artillery and trained to fly at No. 22 Elementary Flying Training School RAF, RAF Cambridge, further developing advanced flying skills at No. 43 Operational Training Unit RAF (43 OTU), RAF Andover. The first commanding officer was Major Dave Ely, RCA; the operational commanding officer was Major D.W. Blyth, RCA. In England the squadron operated under the overall control of No. 70 Group, RAF Fighter Command; prior to deployment to the European continent, the squadron was transferred to No. 84 Group, Second Tactical Air Force (2 TAF).

In January 1945, the squadron was deployed to RAF Penshurst, deploying to the Netherlands in March 1945. The squadron flew its first operational sortie over the enemy front in the Netherlands on March 22, 1945. The principal aircraft flown in action was the Taylorcraft Auster Mk. IV and V. After V-E Day on May 8, 1945, the squadron was tasked with flying mail and passengers for First Canadian Army. The squadron continued flying like duties for the Canadian Army Occupation Force (CAOF) until the spring of 1946. 664 (AOP) Squadron, RCAF, was disbanded at Bad Zwischenahn, Germany, on 31 May 1946. The squadron had no motto or heraldic badge assigned to it.

Although the squadron's trained aircrew observers performed yeoman service in aerial action against the enemy, aircrew associations across Canada did not grant membership to AOP observers, as those aircrew were not officially issued with cloth wings during the war.
