= Dishforth Airfield =

Military airfield in North Yorkshire, England

Dishforth Airfield
- Near Dishforth, North Yorkshire in England
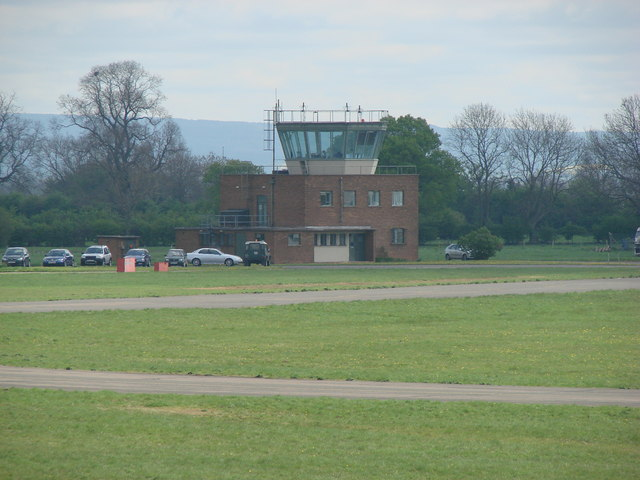
- The control tower at Dishforth Airfield during 2007

Site information
- Type: Army base
- Owner: Ministry of Defence
- Operator: British Army
- Controlled by: Royal Logistics Corps
- Condition: Operational

Location
- Location in North Yorkshire
- Coordinates: 54°08′13″N 001°25′12″W

Site history
- Built: 1936 (as RAF Dishforth)
- In use: Royal Air Force (1936–1992); Army Air Corps (1992–present)

Garrison information
- Garrison: 6 Regiment RLC

Airfield information
Runways
Direction	Length and surface
10/28	1,362 metres (4,469 ft) Asphalt
15/33	1,858 metres (6,096 ft) Asphalt
- Airfield no longer in use

Dishforth Airfield (ICAO: EGXD) is a former Royal Air Force and current British Army station in North Yorkshire, England. It was previously an Army Air Corps helicopter base and a Relief Landing Ground for RAF Linton-on-Ouse. 6 Regiment RLC is currently located at Dishforth. It is located next to the A1(M) at Junction 49 with the A168. Dishforth airfield is built over part of the Great North Road which is also the old A1. It is 4.4 miles (7.1 km) east of Ripon, North Yorkshire and 11.5 miles (18.5 km) north east of Harrogate, North Yorkshire, England.

== RAF use (1936–1992) ==
=== Early years ===
Royal Air Force Dishforth opened in 1936. At the beginning of the Second World War, it became part of 4 Group, RAF Bomber Command, and was used for recruit training. Between September 1939 and April 1941, No. 78 Squadron RAF used it to launch night operations using Armstrong Whitworth Whitley medium bombers. Between 1943 and 1945, the station was used by No. 6 (RCAF) Group Bomber Command and was a sub-station of RAF Topcliffe. Immediately after the war, the station was used to convert aircrew to the Douglas Dakota transport aircraft.

=== Postwar ===
After the war, the station was occupied by training and transport units. No. 241 Operational Conversion Unit RAF were at the site from 5 January 1948 – 16 April 1951; No. 47 Squadron RAF from 14 September 1948 – 22 August 1949; No. 297 Squadron RAF from 1 November 1948 to 22 August 1949; and then conversion units again, No. 240 Operational Conversion Unit RAF briefly in March – April 1951 before being merged into the new No. 242 Operational Conversion Unit RAF (at the station from 16 April 1951 – 29 January 1962).

No. 30 Squadron RAF arrived on 14 April 1953, operating the Blackburn Beverley, and was based here until November 1959. No. 215 Squadron RAF arrived on 30 April 1956, equipped with Scottish Aviation Pioneer CC Mk. 1 aircraft, but it was renumbered No. 230 Squadron RAF on 1 September 1958. 230 Squadron was at Dishforth from 1 September – 27 November 1958, and then briefly in April 1959.

No. 1325 (Transport) Flight RAF comprising three Douglas Dakota aircraft formed at Dishforth on 1 August 1956. It was established to support Operation Buffalo and Operation Antler, the British nuclear tests at Maralinga in Australia. 1325 Flight was soon relocated to Christmas Island (Kiritimati) to support the Grapple series of nuclear tests in the Pacific Ocean.

Headquarters No. 23 Group RAF of Flying Training Command arrived at Dishforth on 8 March 1962. It stayed until 11 July 1966. 23 Group's Communications Flight had arrived just under a month earlier, on 12 February 1962, and was at the station until 1 October 1964. Two other units were also present in 1962–66: Leeds University Air Squadron flying the de Havilland Canada DHC-1 Chipmunk T Mk 10; and No. 60 Maintenance Unit RAF between 1 March 1962 and 2 February 1966.

From 1962, the station also became a Relief Landing Ground, successively for 1 FTS and 3 FTS. Jet Provosts from RAF Leeming used the site in this fashion, with personnel deployed from RAF Leeming on a day-to-day basis. Avro Vulcan V-Bomber aircraft were dispersed to Dishforth during exercises, and would have been dispersed from RAF Scampton during any hostilities during the Cold War.

During the 1970s and 1980s, part of the base was used as a police training centre for northern English police forces from Northumbria down to Hertfordshire.

== Army use (1992–present) ==
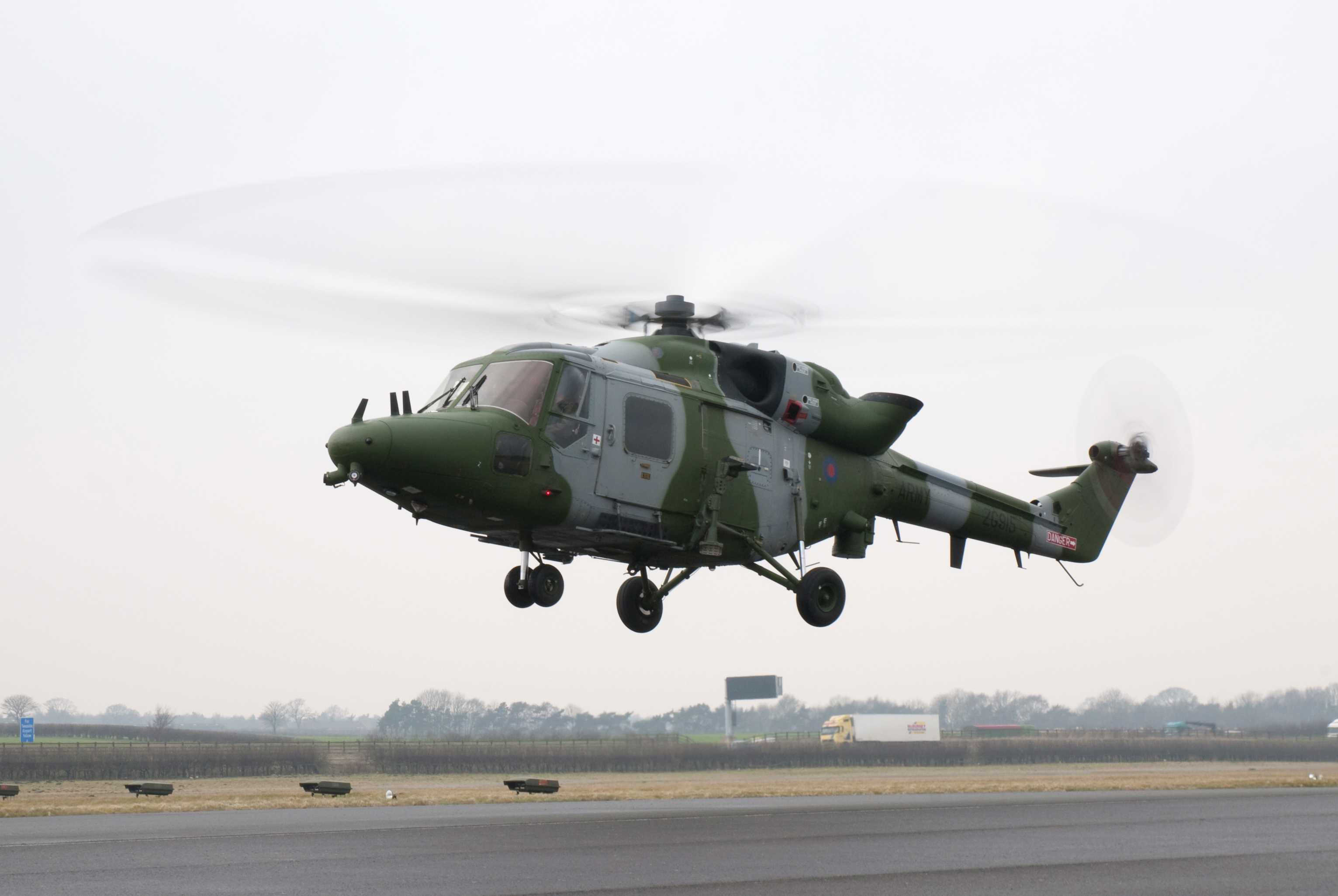
A British Army Westland Lynx AH9A at Dishforth during 2010

Dishforth was transferred from the RAF to Army Air Corps use by 9 Regiment Army Air Corps in 1992 and became known as Dishforth Airfield.

Dishforth was the first base to receive the AgustaWestland Apache AH.1 helicopter, and had 16, divided between 2 squadrons. Following a reshuffle of AAC units in 2006/2007 Apaches were concentrated on Wattisham Airfield in Suffolk. Between 2007 and 2016, Dishforth had three squadrons of Westland Lynx AH.7 & AH.9 helicopters. In 2007, personnel and Apache helicopters from the Army Air Corps took part in the rescue mission at Jugroom Fort, which involved marines being strapped to the sides of the helicopter as it flew into Taliban held territory to recover their dead colleague.

Dishforth Airfield underwent a major expansion in 2016 as 6 Force Logistic Regiment, Royal Logistic Corps moved from Princess Royal Barracks, Gütersloh in Germany to Dishforth. The official handover took place on 30 June 2016. 9 Regiment Army Air Corps disbanded and most of its soldiers merged with 1 Regiment Army Air Corps who also moved from Germany to RNAS Yeovilton (HMS Heron) in Somerset.

== Based units ==
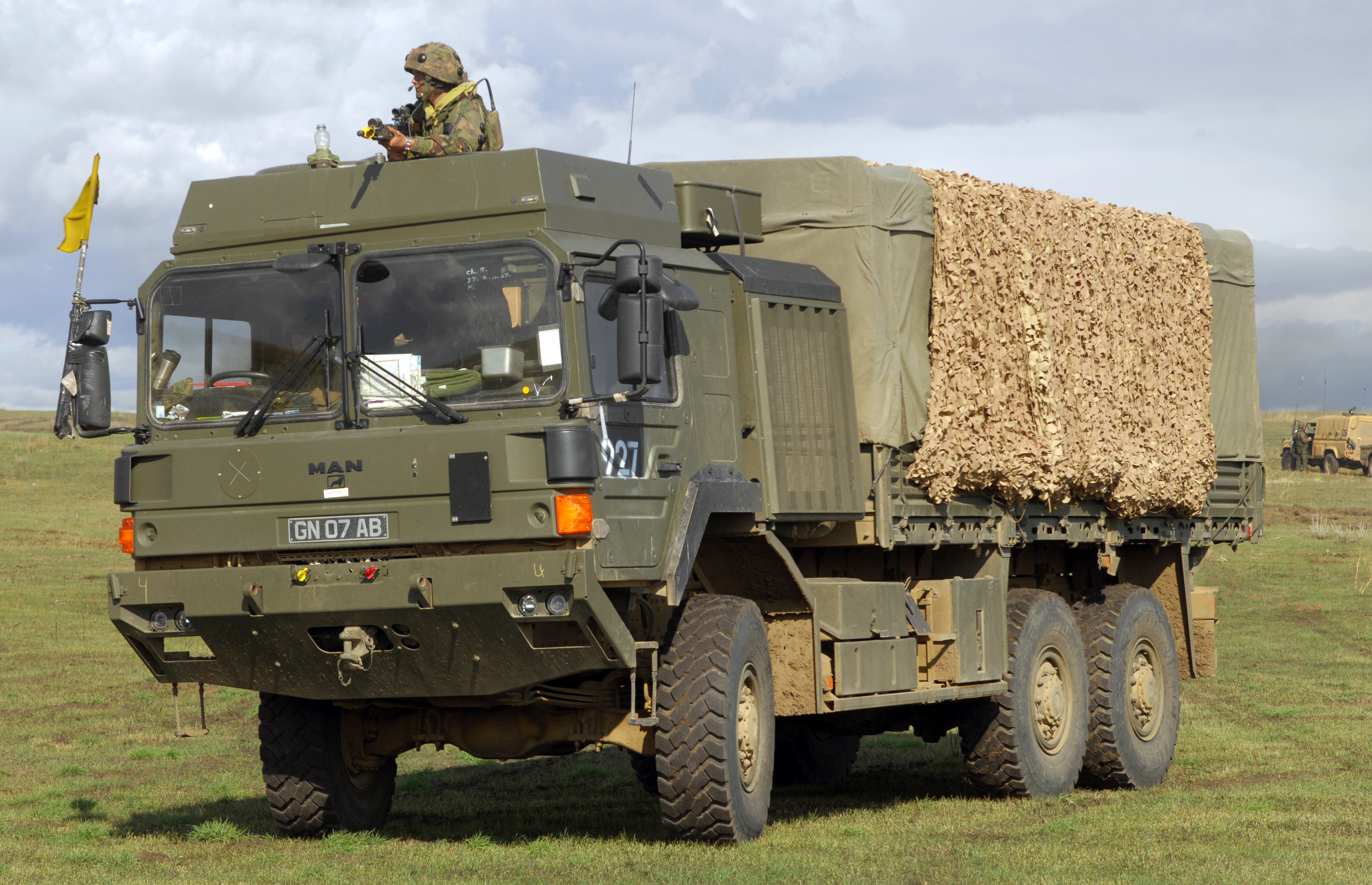
A MAN support truck of the type used by 6 Regiment Royal Logistics Corps

Notable units based at Dishforth Airfield.

=== British Army ===
Royal Logistic Corps

- 6 Regiment RLC
  - 62 Squadron
  - 64 Squadron
  - 600 Headquarters Squadron
  - 32 Close Support Squadron
  - REME Light Aid Detachment

== Future ==
In November 2016, the Ministry of Defence announced that it intended to close the site in 2031. In November 2021, it was announced that Dishforth Airfield would be retained and remain open to support the delivery of Future Soldier.

== See also ==
- List of former Royal Air Force stations

== Sources ==
- Jefford, C.G. RAF Squadrons, a Comprehensive Record of the Movement and Equipment of all RAF Squadrons and their Antecedents since 1912. Shrewsbury, Shropshire, UK: Airlife Publishing, 1988. ISBN 1-84037-141-2.
- Lake, A (1999). Flying units of the RAF. Shrewsbury: Airlife. ISBN 1-84037-086-6.
