= AgustaWestland Apache =

Attack helicopter series of the British Army

Apache AH1
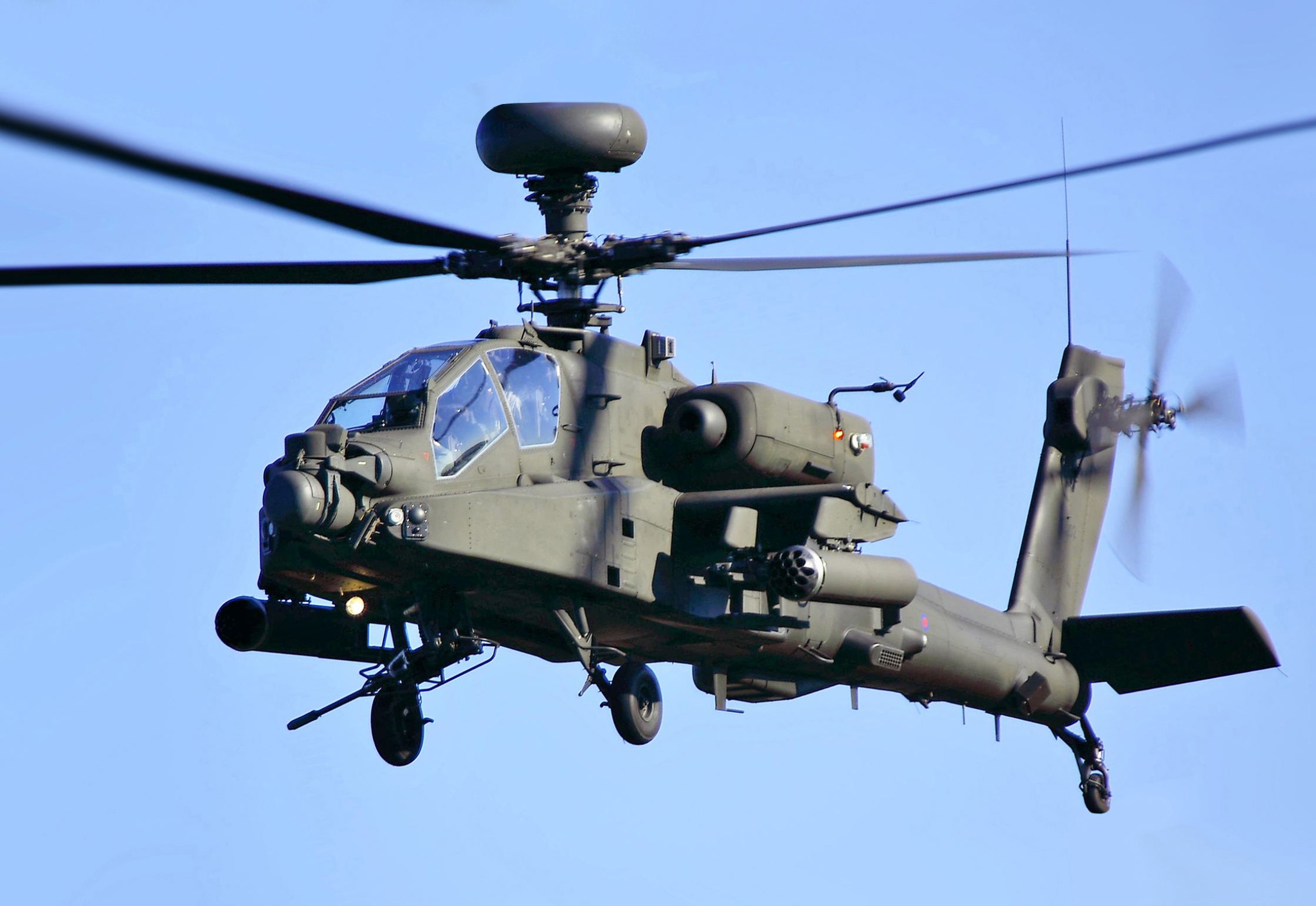
- An Apache AH1 at the Duxford Autumn Airshow 2010

General information
- Type: Attack helicopter
- National origin: United States; United Kingdom
- Manufacturer: Boeing; Westland Helicopters; AgustaWestland
- Status: Retired
- Primary user: British Army
- Number built: 67

History
- Manufactured: 1998–2004
- Introduction date: 2004
- First flight: September 1998
- Retired: 25 March 2024
- Developed from: Boeing AH-64D Apache Longbow

The AgustaWestland Apache is a licence-built version of the Boeing AH-64D Apache Longbow attack helicopter for the British Army Air Corps. The first eight helicopters were built by Boeing; the remaining 59 were assembled by Westland Helicopters (later AgustaWestland) at Yeovil, Somerset, in England from Boeing-supplied kits. Changes from the AH-64D include Rolls-Royce Turbomeca RTM322 engines, a new electronic defensive aids suite and a folding blade mechanism allowing the British version to operate from ships. The helicopter was initially designated WAH-64 by Westland Helicopters and was later given the designation Apache AH Mk 1 (also written as "Apache AH1") by the Ministry of Defence.

The Apache was a valued form of close air support in the conflict in Afghanistan, being deployed to the region in 2006. Naval trials and temporary deployments at sea had proven the aircraft as an able platform to operate from the decks of ships, which was a unique application of the Apache amongst its operators. British Apaches also served in the NATO 2011 military intervention in Libya operating from Royal Navy ships.

The Apache AH1 was retired in 25 March 2024 and the majority of the airframes were remanufactured to the later AH-64E version.

== Development ==
The requirement for a new attack helicopter was identified by the British government in the early 1990s. In 1993, invitations to bid were issued. Bids received included the Eurocopter Tiger, a modernised Bell AH-1 SuperCobra, the AH-64 Apache, the Boeing/Sikorsky RAH-66 Comanche, and the Agusta A129 Mangusta. Both the Tiger, Commanche and upgraded Cobra variant required more development, and thus risk, while the Apache was combat proven, though its performance in the First Gulf War was criticised by competitors. Westland and the Apache was selected in July 1995, and a contract for 67 helicopters was signed in 1996.

"I have no doubt whatsoever that the Attack Helicopter will represent the biggest single enhancement to the Army's capability for many years. It will change the way we go to battle. Now we have taken the decision to buy the Apache, the Army must ensure that doctrine is developed to allow us to make the fullest possible use of its tremendous capability."

— Chief of the General Staff, General Sir Charles Guthrie, 1996.

In September 1998, Westland produced the first prototype WAH-64 Apache under licence from Boeing. The first nine Apache AH1s were authorised for service by the director of British Army Aviation on 16 January 2001. The 67th and final Apache was handed over to the British Army in July 2004. The helicopter fleet's cost was around £3.1 billion, with a total acquisition cost of £4.1 billion.

Reliability had been questioned by US Apache operations, the entire fleet in the Balkans had been grounded due to serious tail rotor failures in 1999. In 1998, the AN/APG-78 Longbow radar's development ran into problems regarding its weight, impact upon overall agility, and data transfer abilities. These problems with key aircraft components, and fleet's high cost, led to calls for its cancellation in 1999.

When the requirement for the Apache had been formalised in the early 1990s, military doctrine assumed that a large conventional armoured assault from the Eastern Bloc was Britain's main threat. Following the collapse and break-up of the Soviet Union, the concepts of flexibility and rapid response took precedence. The UK's Strategic Defence Review called for Apaches to undertake amphibious attack missions, operating from the helicopter carrier HMS Ocean, the Invincible-class aircraft carriers (all since retired) and their successors, the Queen Elizabeth-class aircraft carriers, and possibly the amphibious assault vessels HMS Bulwark and Albion. Each squadron equipped with the Apache should have eight operational aircraft.

The Westland Apache experienced delays in entering service due to complications with the modifications made for British service. Prior to the Apache entering service in 2004, several development problems were noted, including a lack of the ability to securely communicate with other helicopters and a risk of damage to the tail rotor and airframe from firing its Hellfire missiles. The problem with using the Hellfire was debris generated by the firing of missiles, both the Hellfire and CRV7 rockets, could strike the body of the aircraft and cause damage; resolving this issue created a delay to training programmes. These problems were corrected prior to entering service, a secure communications suite was installed and Hellfire missiles are routinely fired by Apaches. In 2002, government sources stated that full operational capability was set to be achieved by 2010.

In 2005, an out-of-service date for the Apache was forecast at 2030. Various options were considered for maintaining the capability:

- A capability sustainment programme (CSP) to extend the existing fleet's life to 2040.
- Buying new Block III helicopters
- Remanufacturing to AH-64E standard, i.e. putting the existing engines and avionics into new airframes.

In August 2015, the UK requested the upgrade of 50 of its Apaches to AH-64E standard through a US Foreign Military Sale. The order was confirmed in 2016, with the contract for remanufacturing of the first 38 awarded in 2017 and the remaining 12 in 2019. Leonardo Helicopters continued to lead the support to the Apache AH1s until they were retired from service in 2024. The Apache AH1 was remanufactured by Boeing to become AH-64E Version 6 aircraft with US engines.

The Australian Army purchased two retired AgustaWestland Apaches in 2024. The helicopters will be used as non-flying training aids ahead of the delivery of AH-64E Apaches to the Army. Both helicopters were transported from the UK to the US in March 2024 to be modified to ground training airframes.

== Design ==
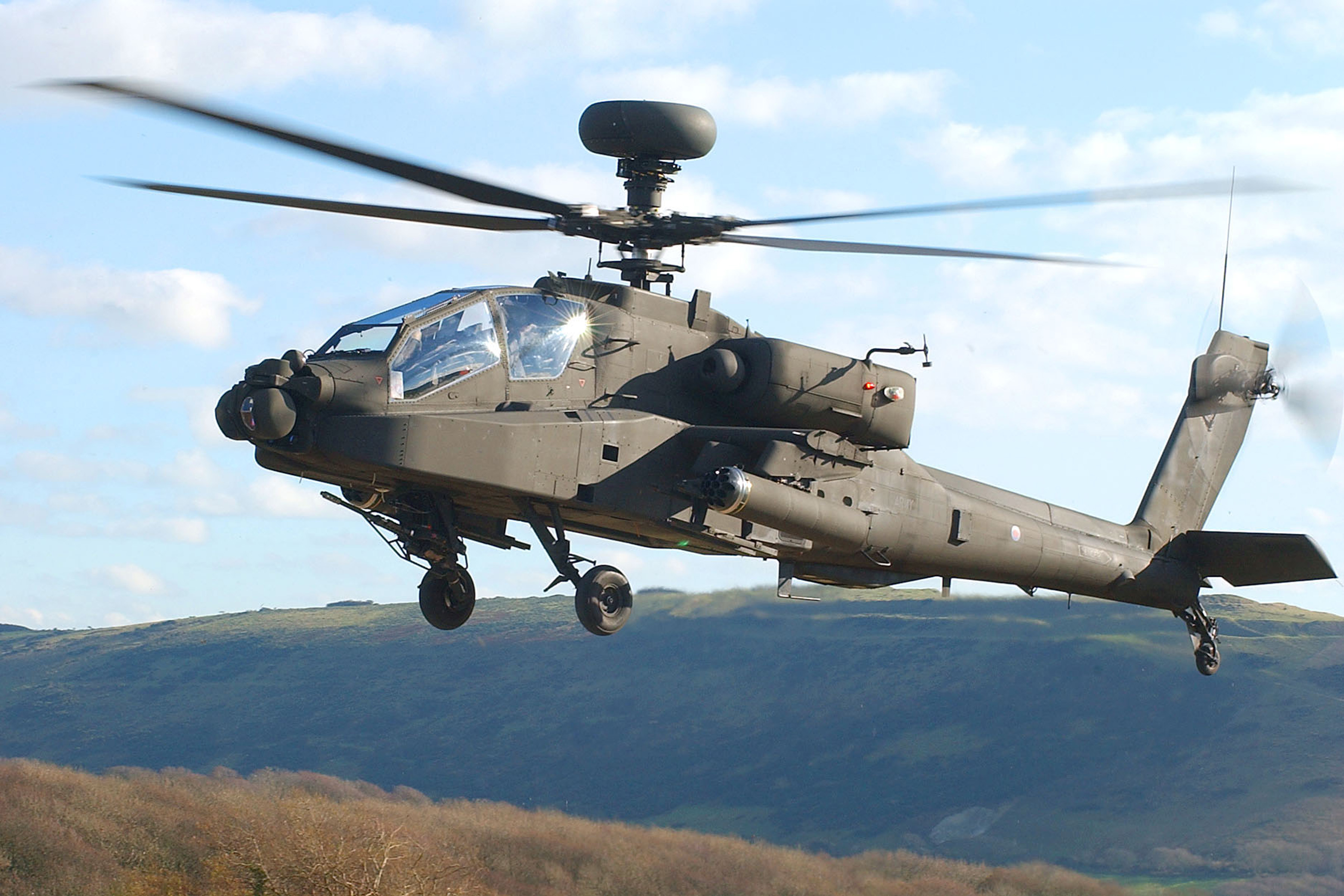
Apache in training at Lulworth-Bovington, 2002

External videos
- BBC Tour of an Apache

Several deviations were made to the standard Apache design used by the US and those exported to other countries. One major difference is the use of a pair of Rolls-Royce Turbomeca RTM322 01/12 engines, replacing the original General Electric T700-GE-701C engines. The Rolls-Royce engine produces 1,565 kW (2,100 hp) vs. 1,410 kW (1,890 hp) for the GE T700C engine. Compared to many helicopters used by coalition forces in Afghanistan, the Apache required less modification to serve in the region due to special filters incorporated into the engine design. Another change is the folding blade mechanism to stow the helicopters in confined spaces; the rotor blades also have anti-ice protection to allow operations in Arctic environments.

There were changes made to the sensor and avionics outfitting the craft as well; connectivity with the BOWMAN secure communications system to interact with other British military units being a significant one. The Leonardo (formerly Selex ES) Helicopter Integrated Defensive Aids System (HIDAS) was also fitted. The HIDAS system was retrofitted onto the aircraft in mid-2004 just prior to entering service, along with several redesigned composite bodywork components.

Instead of the American Hydra 70 rocket pods, the Westland Apache can carry up to 76 CRV7 rockets. The CRV7 uses a modular warhead: "a high explosive, semi-armour piercing warhead for attacks on unarmoured targets and a kinetic energy penetrator, which contains no explosive, for attacks on armoured targets". There used to be a third type of warhead: the Multi-Purpose Sub Munition (MPSM), which was a controversial weapon as it has been classified as a cluster bomb; each rocket contained nine M73 submunitions. In May 2008, several senior officers, such as General David Ramsbotham spoke out against British plans to keep the weapon. In the same month, Britain, as one of the 111 participating nations, agreed to ban cluster bombs on humanitarian grounds. Britain destroyed the last of its CRV7 MPSMs in July 2009.

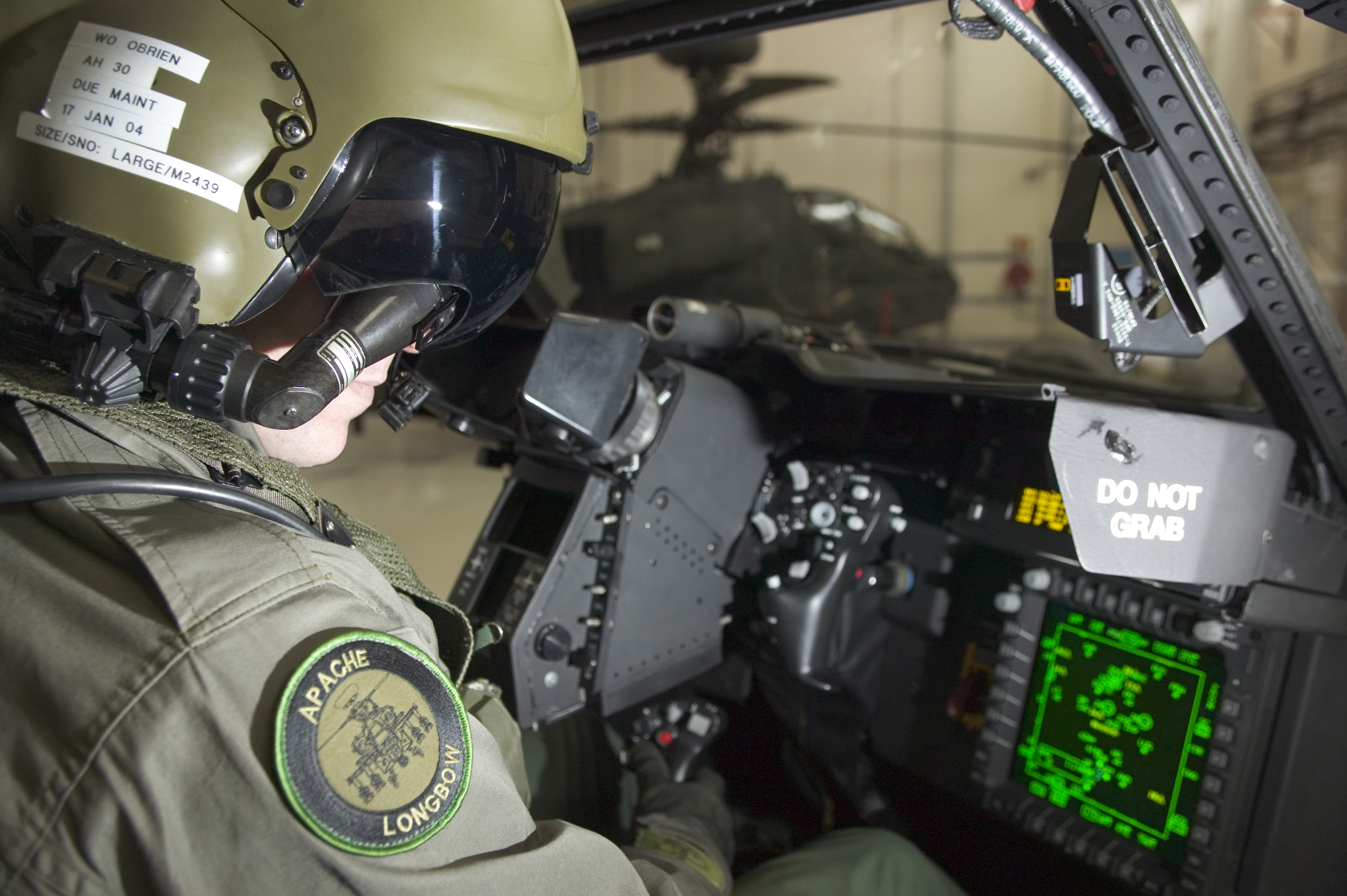
Longbow radar screen

Like the US AH-64D Apache Longbow, the Apache AH1 carried an AN/APG-78 Longbow fire-control radar (FCR) and Radar Frequency Interferometer (RFI), providing an integrated surveillance and attack system. The 'Longbow' radar was the bulbous unit over the rotor hub assembly; radar placement above the rotors allowed the Apache to hover behind cover scanning for targets, with only the radar unit exposed. Additionally, the Longbow radar could monitor traffic in the Apache's airspace. The radar could also be used for surveillance and terrain profiling. A modem was interfaced into the Longbow radar and other sensor systems to relay information to other aircraft, this allowed other Apaches to fire on targets identified by only a single helicopter.

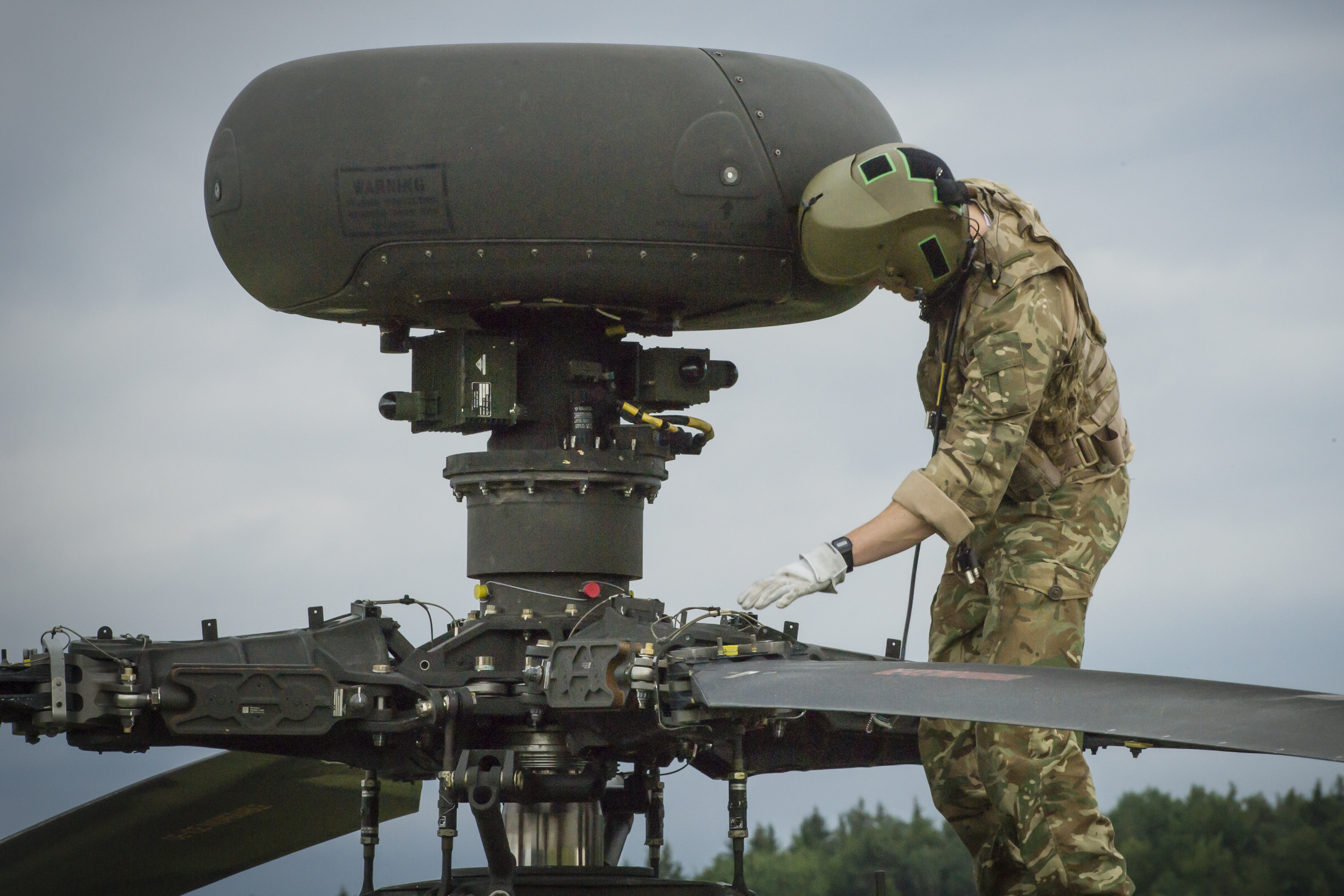
Longbow radar

AgustaWestland made several upgrades to Britain's Apache fleet. In May 2005, a $212 million contract was awarded to equip all the Mk1 helicopters with the Apache Arrowhead sensor system upgrade, to be completed by 2010. In 2009, it was announced that AgustaWestland was also integrating new external fuel tanks with ballistic protection. The magazine could be replaced with an Integrated Ammunition and Fuel unit, which reduced the ammunition capacity but increased loitering time. It had been suggested that advanced rotor blades and additional controls to improve the agility of the aircraft may have been fitted in a mid-life update of the fleet.

== Operational history ==
=== Overview ===
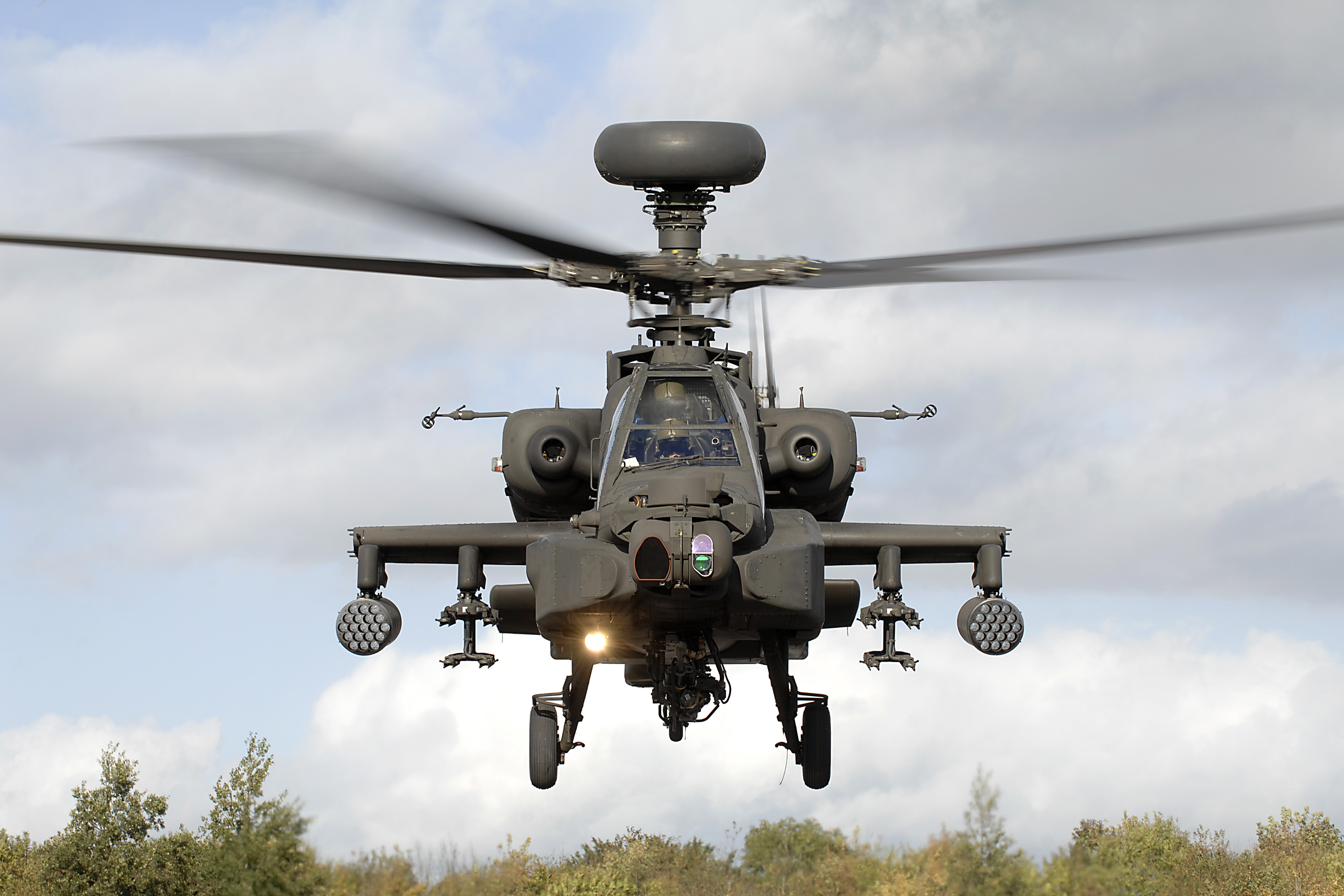
Showing CRV7 rocket pods and rails for Hellfire missiles in 2012

In May 2005, the first Apache-equipped regiment achieved operational status. The Westland Apache replaced the Westland Lynx AH7 as the British Army's tactical attack helicopter. The Apache was operated by two regiments of the Army Air Corps (3 Regt AAC and 4 Regt AAC) as part of 1st Aviation Brigade. The Apache was intended to operate in the armed reconnaissance and attack roles, similar to the US usage of Apaches during the 1991 Gulf War. Unlike US versions, the Westland Apache had been partially navalised and for a time served aboard Royal Navy ships in addition to its land-based role. It achieved maritime certification in December 2005 aboard HMS Ocean. On 17 November 2006, HMS Ark Royal became the first aircraft carrier to land an Apache AH1.

They first appeared in combat as part of Operation Herrick in Afghanistan in May 2006. In August 2006, the intense usage of Apaches in Afghanistan led to British commanders admitting that weapons and spare parts were being used at a far greater rate, and subsequently a greater cost, than anticipated. On 11 November 2007, it was reported that half of the Apache gunships in British service had been grounded as they had fallen below the level considered "fit for purpose", along with several other British Helicopters such as the Chinook and Merlin HC3. By November 2008, the situation had further declined, out of 67 aircraft only 20 were available for combat operations. In 2009, AgustaWestland was awarded a contract for support services for the Apache and many components such as the Longbow radar; in the following months senior officers noted that the support change had resulted in higher availability. In June 2011, civilian maintainers of the Apache at Wattisham Airfield threatened industrial action over a pay dispute.

In October 2008 it was announced that Prince Harry had begun the process of qualifying to become an Apache pilot. In May 2010, the terrorist organisation Al Qaeda threatened to abduct the prince if he piloted an Apache in Afghanistan. In April 2011, Prince Harry was promoted to captain following his completion of Apache conversion training. In June 2011, sections of the media reported that Prince Harry was to deploy to Afghanistan as an Apache pilot in 2012. He subsequently deployed to Afghanistan as part of 662 Squadron in September 2012.

Three Apaches were deployed to Bardufoss Air Station in Norway in January 2019. The deployment, known as Exercise Clockwork, represented the aircraft's first cold weather training within the Arctic Circle.

=== Afghanistan ===
The Apache's first operational tour was as part of 16 Air Assault Brigade in Afghanistan; there were eight Apache AH1s deployed in Afghanistan in February 2007. These were drawn from No. 656 Squadron and No. 664 Squadron of 9 Regiment AAC, based at Dishforth Airfield. Unlike their American counterparts in Afghanistan, the Apache AH1 is deployed with its Longbow Fire Control Radar to enable the pilot to better manage traffic in their airspace. Initially pilots had to often fly for 16–18 hours at a time due to the low number of Apaches in the theatre; typically each Apache would be stationed in Afghanistan for eight weeks before returning to Britain for roughly eight weeks of maintenance. On 22 May 2006, a UK Apache operating in Afghanistan's Helmand province used a Hellfire missile to destroy an abandoned French vehicle to protect sensitive equipment.

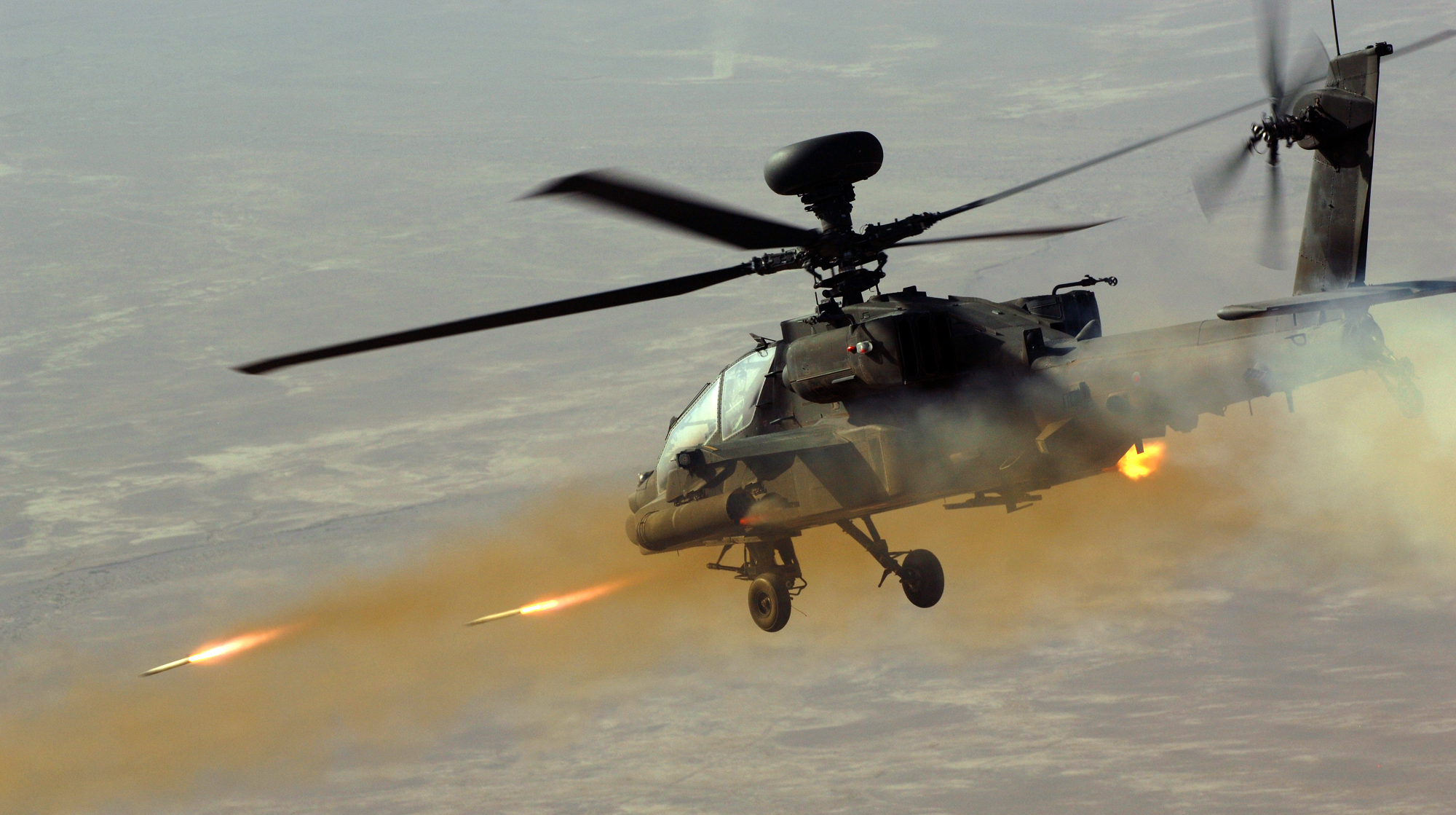
Firing rockets at insurgents during a 2008 patrol in Afghanistan

External media

Images
- Three soldiers strapped to Apache's wings

Video
- BBC News coverage

The Apache quickly became a highly valued tool against insurgents, able to rapidly respond to Taliban forces on the ground. Major Huw Williams, second in command of 3rd Battalion, The Parachute Regiment, stated that: "We're really impressed [with the Apache]. It's a very effective beast." It has been noted that Taliban forces refer to the aircraft as the "Mosquito".

On 13 January 2007, a 200-strong British force, led by Royal Marines, launched an operation to attack Jugroom Fort, a major Taliban base in southern Helmand Province. After several hours of intense fighting, the Marines regrouped and it was discovered that Lance Corporal Mathew Ford of 45 Commando Royal Marines was missing. A rescue mission was launched using four volunteers, Royal Marines and a Royal Engineer, strapped to the stub-wings of two Apaches. The helicopters could not travel above 50 mph to ensure the safety of the extra passengers from rotor downwash. The Apaches landed under fire inside the compound, after which the rescuers dismounted and recovered the body of LCpl Ford. Ford's body was flown out in the same manner that the soldiers arrived. Another Apache hovered above, providing suppressive fire throughout. None of the rescuers were injured in the recovery mission and they were later hailed for their bravery.

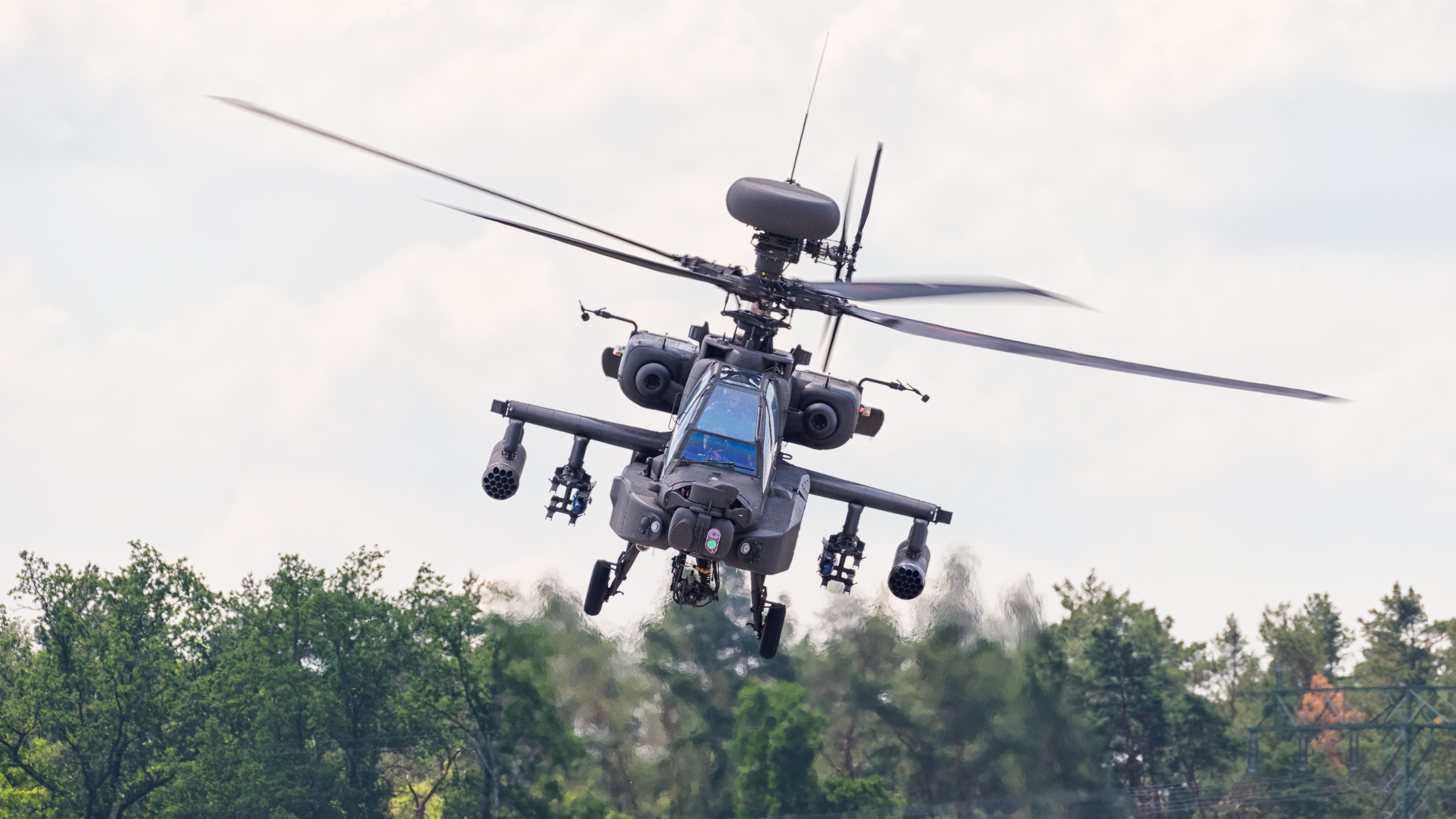
Front view of Apache AH1 at Berlin Air Show 2016

In May and June 2008, British and Afghan National Army forces conducted Operation Eagle's Eye, aimed at disrupting Taliban activities to the south of Musa Qaleh; a key portion of which was a major night-time helicopter raid, rapidly deploying members of 2nd Battalion, Parachute Regiment into the town. In June 2008, a British Apache fired a thermobaric Hellfire missile; the controversial usage of such weapons was approved after extensive legal and ethical evaluations within the MoD. In June 2008, a Taliban leader and several cell members were killed in Helmand Province by a Hellfire missile launched by an Apache of the 664 Army Air Corps. There was a friendly fire incident in July 2008, in which an Apache fired upon a position thought to be held by enemy forces, but instead hit members of a British patrol; this was the first time that a British aircraft had been involved in a blue-on-blue incident in Afghanistan. In September 2008, an Apache was seriously damaged by a crash shortly after takeoff in Helmand province; no loss of life occurred but the airframe was written off.

In early to mid-2009, several narcotics and bomb-making facilities were raided by British forces, supported by Apaches. During the summer of 2009, British Apaches were an integral component of Operation Panther's Claw, which was aimed at pushing insurgents out of civilian areas in the runup to the 2009 Afghan Elections. During this major offensive, Apaches from the UK routinely flew alongside US Cobra helicopters to provide air support to soldiers of the Royal Regiment of Scotland and the Royal Marines conducting ground operations. During the Summer 2009 operations, a senior Taliban leader, Mullah Mansur, and several accomplices were killed in a precision strike launched by an Apache.

On 25 July 2011, the MoD announced that during a combat operation in the Nahr-e-Saraj district of Helmand province, several Afghan children had been injured from crossfire by an Apache; they were flown to Camp Bastion for medical treatment.

From 2006 to April 2014, British Apache helicopters flew 50,000 hours in Afghanistan, representing one-third of all UK Apache flying. The UK ended combat operations in Afghanistan in October 2014.

=== Naval operations and Libya ===
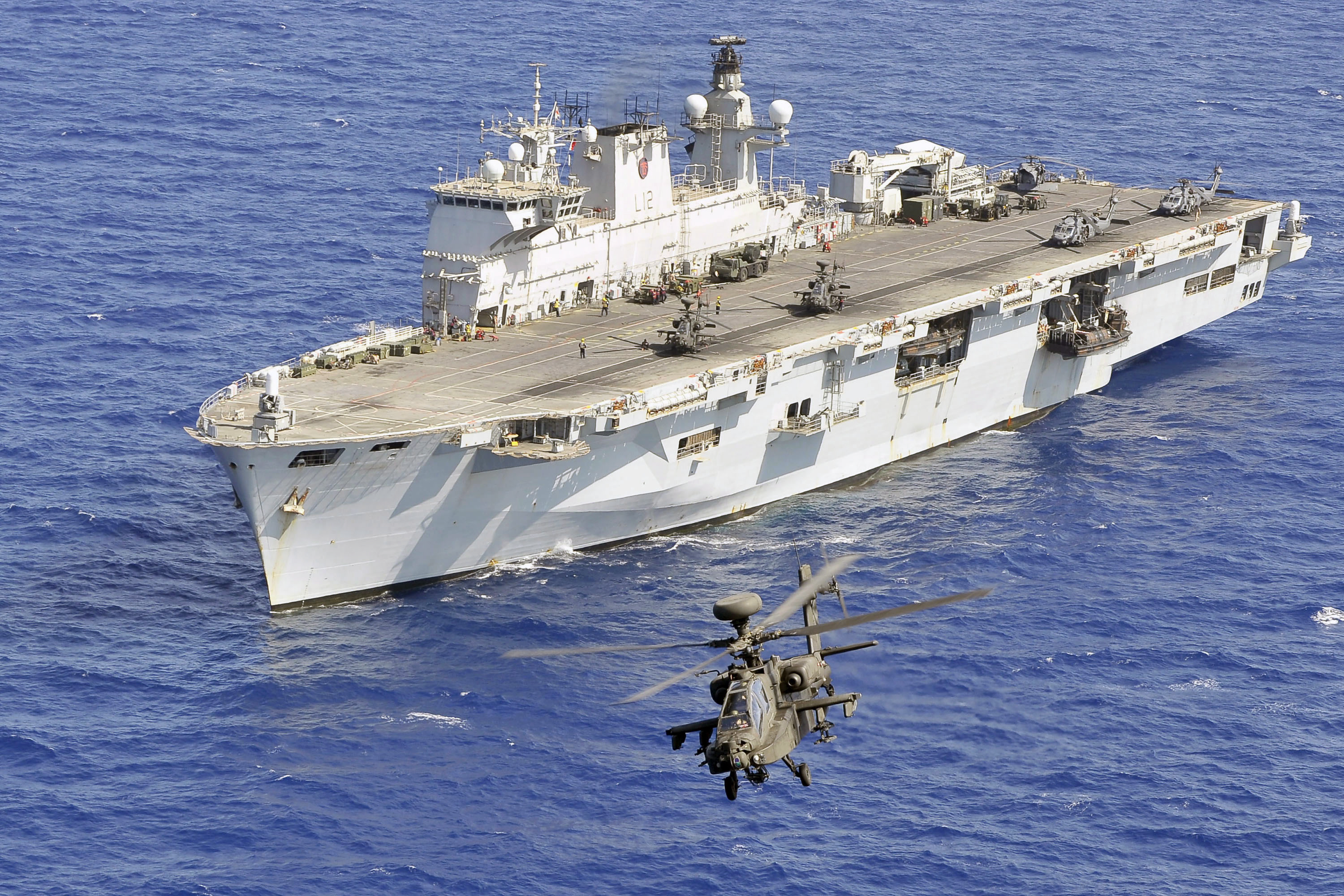
Operating from HMS Ocean off Libya, 2011

External videos
- Footage of nighttime Apache operations

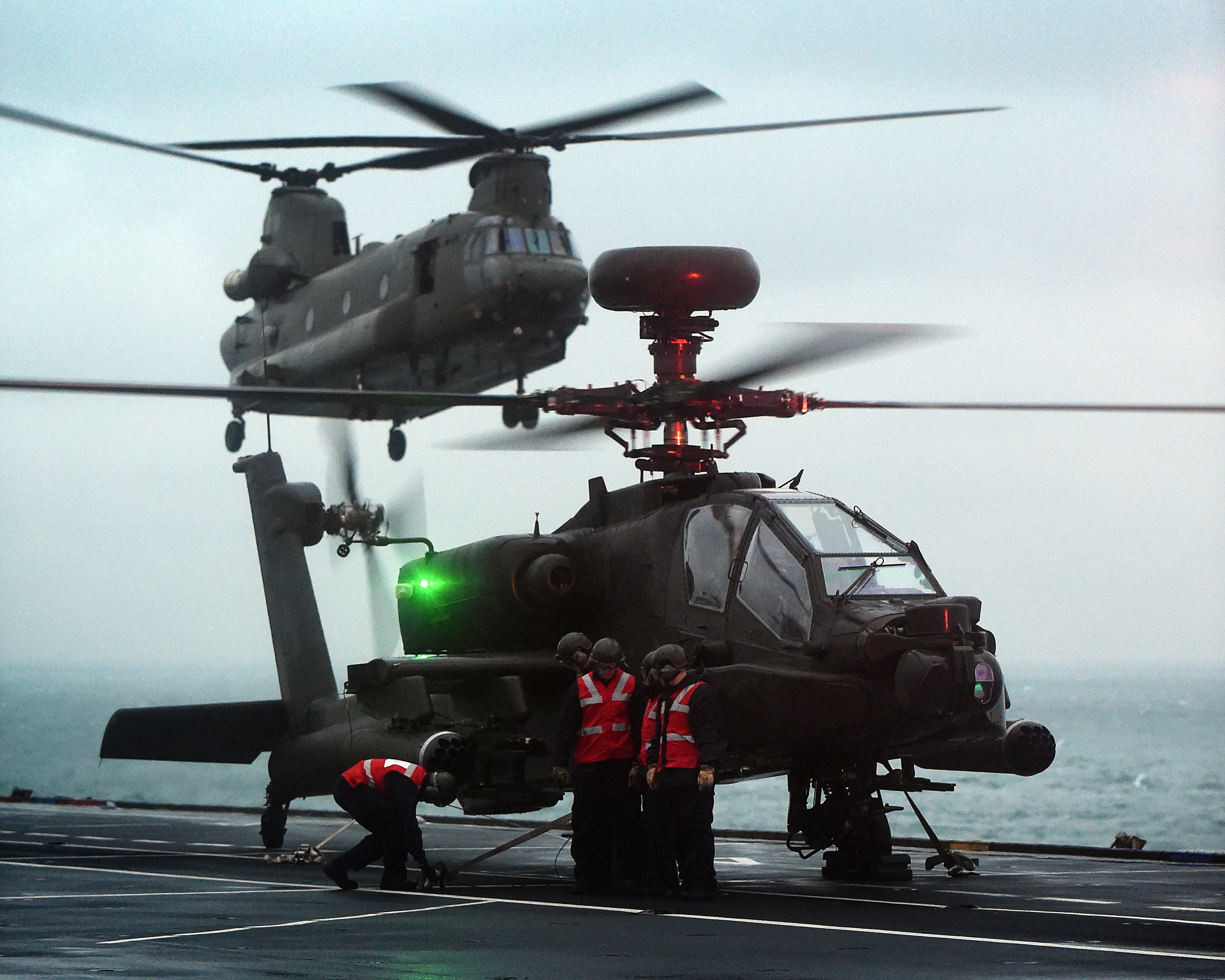
Apache and Chinook at sea on HMS Ocean in November 2014

In May 2011, the MoD announced that the Apache fleet had reached 100,000 hours flying time, and describing it as a "vital battlefield tool in Afghanistan". The Apache was also recognised as having established a "limited maritime strike capability" and were deploying on vessels such as HMS Ocean. On 17 May 2011, the Apache tested its Hellfire missiles against sea targets for the first time, 9 missiles were fired with a 100% success rate.

On 27 May 2011, military officials announced that Apaches would be deployed as part of Operation Ellamy, the ongoing military intervention in Libya. The helicopters operated from the flight deck of HMS Ocean in conjunction with French Eurocopter Tiger helicopters over Misrata. The Apaches were also to assist in Operation Unified Protector, the enforcement of an embargo and no-fly zone upon Libya. On 14 June 2011, reports of British preparation to evacuate Yemen emerged, involving Apache and Merlin helicopters operating from Royal Fleet Auxiliary vessels off the coast.

On 4 June 2011, Apaches struck targets within Libya for the first time, destroying a radar site and an armed checkpoint near the town of Brega. Further precision strikes were launched by Apaches, typical targets were mobile air defenses, and were occasionally engaged by AK-47 fire from ground troops. In early June, Apaches conducted attacks on Gaddafi loyalists assaulting the town of Misrata. On 13 June, British Apaches destroyed several inflatable boats with 30 mm cannon fire, believed to be Libyan Special Forces, before engaging and destroying multiple vehicles along the coastline, including an anti-aircraft system. On 25 June, in coordination with RAF Tornado strikes, Apaches attacked loyalist infantry and vehicles around Brega and its airfield. On 1 July, British Apaches were reportedly involved in a 'fierce' battle at the town of Khoms. On 2 July, Apaches destroyed several tanks and a bunker at a military camp near Zawiya. On 5 August, Apaches participated in the rebel push for the town of Zliten was reported.

By 21 June 2011, the Libyan government had dubiously claimed to have successfully shot down dozens of aircraft, including five Apaches; NATO denied these claims and no Apache losses have been acknowledged to date. On 8 July 2011, the MoD released information on the first month of Apache combat operations over Libya; noting that Apaches had engaged targets within Libya on 39 occasions. Apache operations over Libya have been heavily influenced and supported by NATO reconnaissance flights and intelligence missions; information is continually relayed to update target information, assess the threat of Surface to Air missiles (SAM), and the presence of civilians, enabling real time changes to mission profiles. On 6 August, Apaches struck a military communications facility and troops at Al Watiyah. Both the Apache and the Typhoon were withdrawn from Libyan operations in September 2011 as operational demands decreased.

== Former operators ==
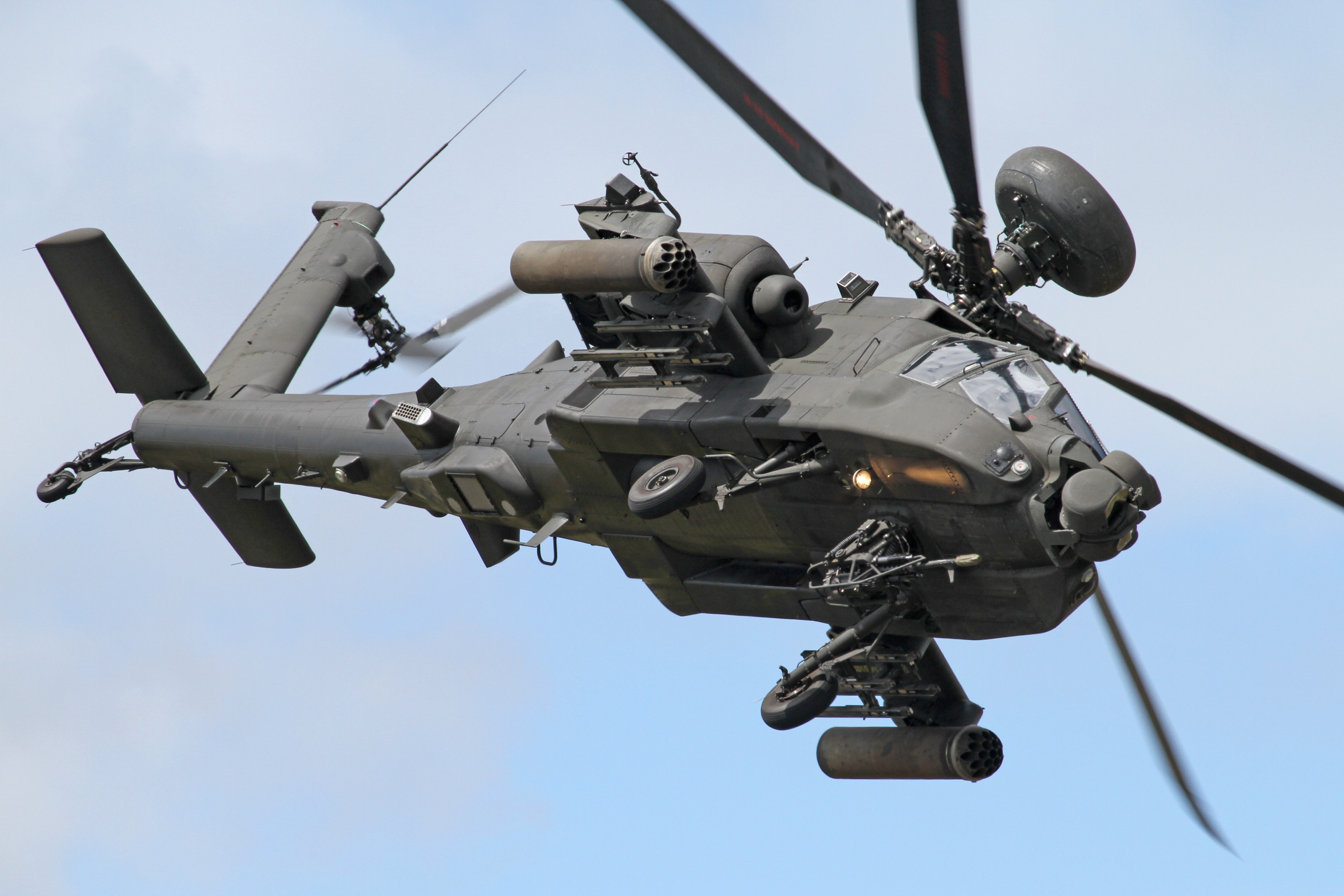

United Kingdom

- British Army Air Corps
  - No. 653 Squadron AAC
  - No. 662 Squadron AAC
  - No. 663 Squadron AAC – operational Conversion Squadron from 2015
  - No. 654 Squadron AAC
  - No. 656 Squadron AAC
  - No. 664 Squadron AAC
  - No. 668 Squadron AAC – Training Squadron
  - No. 673 Squadron AAC – Training Squadron

== Survivors ==
- ZJ224 at the Army Flying Museum, Middle Wallop, Hampshire, UK.

== Specifications (Apache AH1) ==
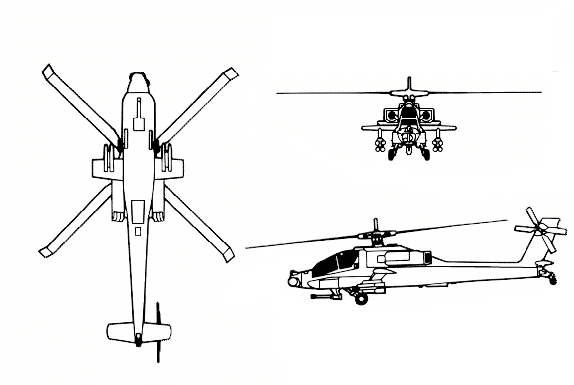

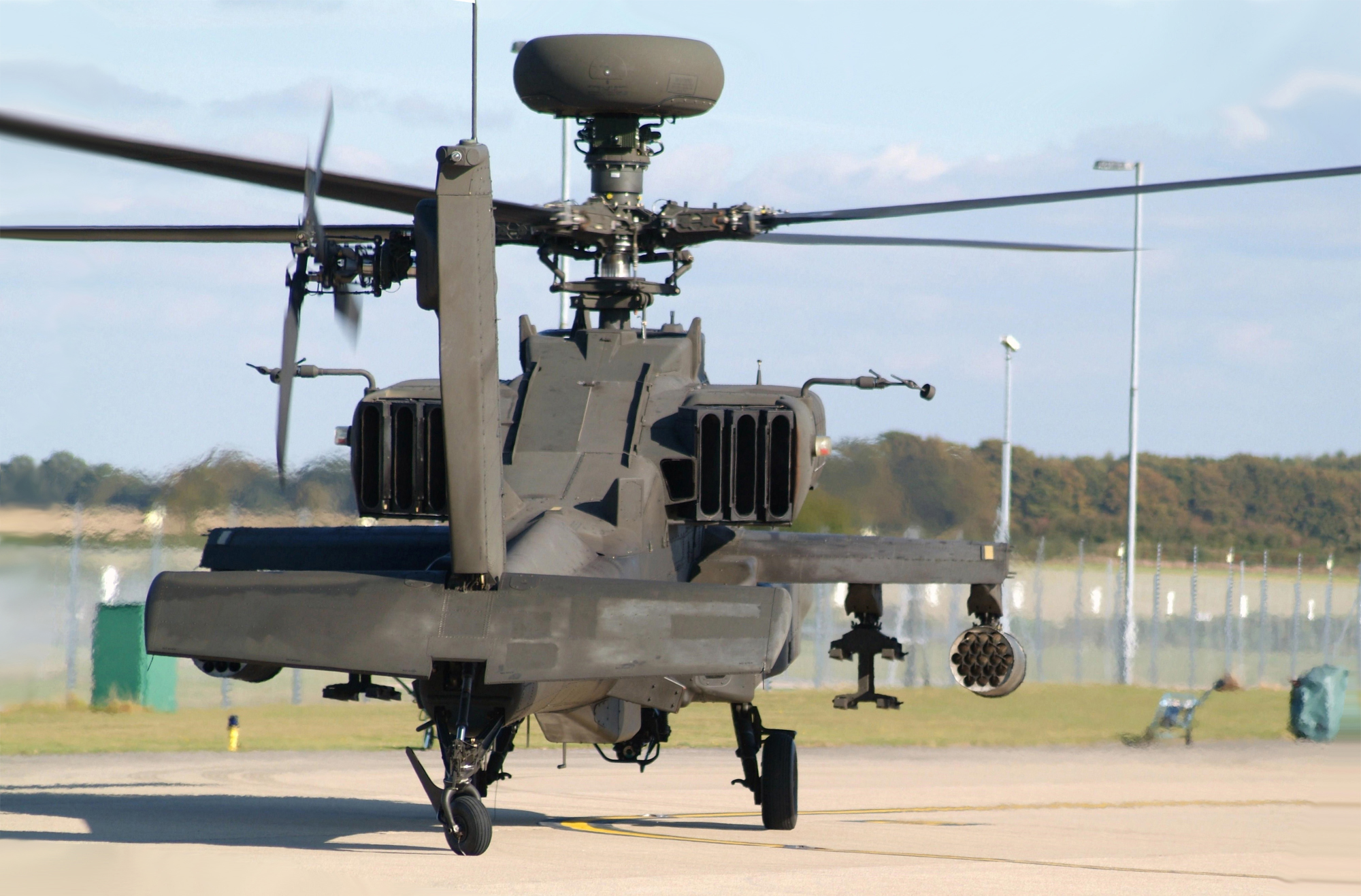
Rear view of an Apache preparing to takeoff, the narrow body is apparent

Data from AgustaWestland page Jane's Air Forces, British Army

General characteristics

- Crew: 2
- Length: 17.7 m (58 ft 4 in with rotors turning)
- Rotor diameter: 14.6 m (48 ft)
- Height: 3.87 m (12 ft 8 in)
- Disc area: 168.11 m^{2} (1,809.5 ft^{2})
- Empty weight: 5,165 kg (11,387 lb)
- Loaded weight: 8,006 kg (17,650 lb)
- Max takeoff weight: 9,525 kg (21,000 lb)
- Powerplant: 2× Rolls-Royce/Turbomeca RTM322 turboshaft, 1,693 kW (2,270 hp) each

Performance

- Never exceed speed: 365 km/h (197 knots, 227 mph)
- Maximum speed: 293 km/h (158 knots, 182 mph)
- Cruise speed: 259 km/h (140 knots, 161 mph)
- Range: 537 km (290 nmi, 334 mi)
- Ferry range: 1,700 km (974 nmi, 1,121 mi)
- Service ceiling: 6,400 m (21,000 ft)
- Rate of climb: 12.7 m/s (2,500 ft/min)

Armament

- Guns: M230 Chain Gun, 1200 rounds
- Missiles: Hellfire (and Starstreak (proposed), Brimstone proposed)
- Rockets: CRV7 with Flechette (Tungsten dart) or High-Explosive Incendiary Semi-Armour Piercing (HEISAP) warheads. Until 2008 also MPSM with nine M-73 bomblets.

== See also ==
Related development

- Boeing AH-64 Apache

Aircraft of comparable role, configuration, and era

- Bell AH-1Z Viper
- CAIC WZ-10
- Denel Rooivalk
- Eurocopter Tiger
- IAIO Toufan
- Kamov Ka-50
- Mil Mi-28
- Panha 2091
- TAI/AgustaWestland T-129

Related lists

- List of active United Kingdom military aircraft
- List of aircraft of the Army Air Corps (United Kingdom)
- List of aviation shootdowns and accidents during the Iraq War
