= Apache Arrowhead =

Targeting & night vision system

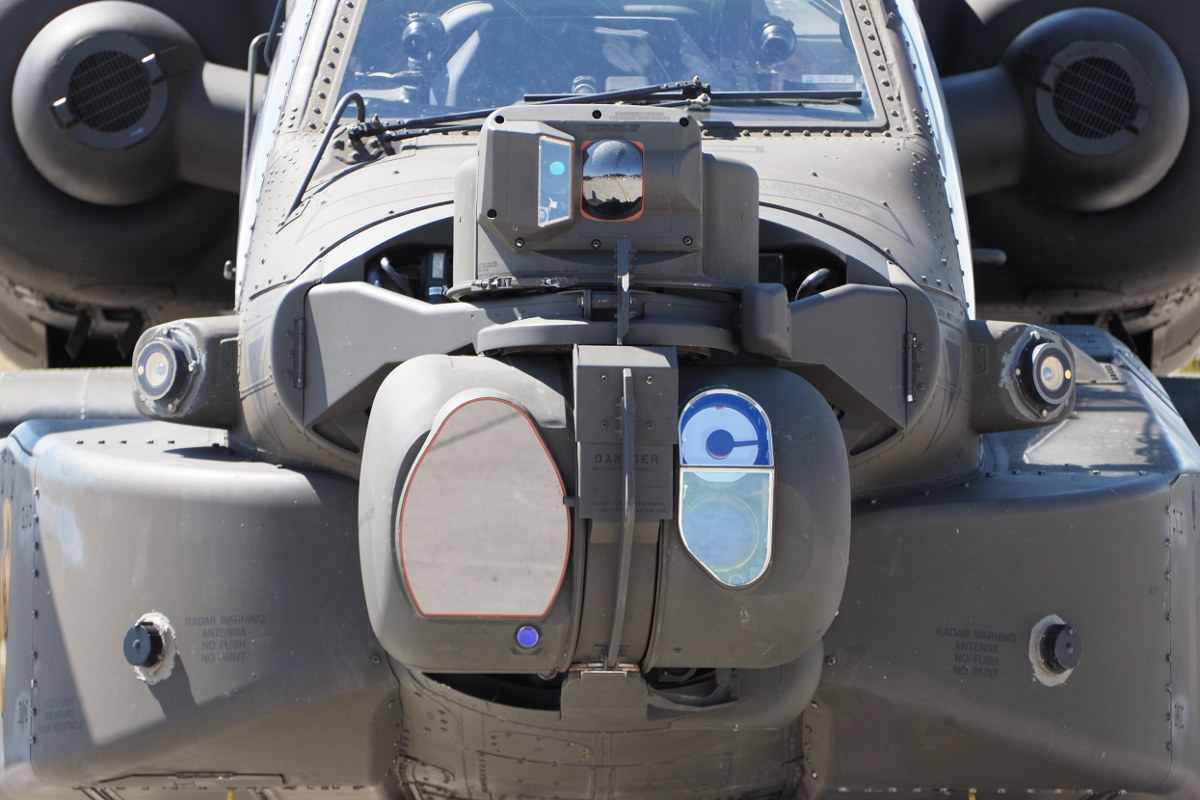
M-TADS / PNVS on a Boeing AH-64 Apache helicopter

The Apache Arrowhead (also Modernized Target Acquisition and Designation Sight/Pilot Night Vision Sensor or M-TADS/PNVS), is an integrated targeting and night vision system developed by Lockheed Martin for the Boeing AH-64 Apache attack helicopter. It uses second-generation long-wave Forward looking infrared (FLIR) sensors with three fields of view, a charge-coupled device TV camera, dual field of view pilotage FLIR, electronic zoom, target tracker and auto-boresight.

It is the second generation of the Target Acquisition and Designation Sights, Pilot Night Vision System (TADS/PNVS) first fielded on Apaches in 1983.

== Development ==
Lockheed Martin signed the original TADS/PNVS production contract on 30 April 1982, and the first TADS/PNVS system was fielded in 1983.

The Boeing Company and Lockheed Martin agreed to initiate the incorporation of new technology into the Arrowhead sensor system during July 2001. The heart of the project is a large-format staring array mid-wave (MW) forward-looking infrared (FLIR) sensor which uses the staring mid-wave integrated detector/cooler assembly (IDCA) used in Lockheed Martin's Sniper Advanced Targeting Pod.

The upgrade is designed to complement the excellent obscurant penetration of the existing long-wave (LW) sensor with a longer-range, smaller-field-of-view MW sensor providing the Apache aircrew with enhanced electro-optical targeting performance in all conditions. The new MW electro-optical system can identify targets at greater ranges than the long-wave system.

The first Arrowhead production contract was awarded 11 November 2003. Lockheed Martin rolled out the first Arrowhead system to the U.S. Army in May 2005, and completed integration on the first Apache helicopters in June 2005.

Arrowhead extends optical targeting ranges and reliability by a factor of two, while also significantly reducing maintenance costs. Quick-access “remove-and-replace” modules are designed to reduce maintenance and save nearly $1 billion in Army operation and support costs over the 20-year life of the Arrowhead system.

=== VNsight ===
The VNsight visible/near infrared sensor is a low light level TV (LLLTV) integrated into the Apache's Modernized Pilot Night Vision Sensor (M-PNVS) and Pathfinder dedicated pilotage sensor (the M-PNVS adapted for cargo and utility aircraft). The additional imaging capability in this wavelength complements the long wave infrared wavelength of the existing sensor and adds significant tactical advantages.

Using VNsight imagery blended with the standard M-PNVS forward looking infrared (FLIR) imagery, pilots can see lighting that was previously unviewable in low-light conditions. This includes lasers, markers, beacons, and tracer rounds, which were not accurately registered with the thermal image over the full sensor field of view. The VNsight upgrade ensures safer flying conditions and enhanced mission capability (especially in urban environments) by improving situation awareness in low-light-level conditions and situations where existing light sources cannot be imaged by the FLIR. It also allows the aircrew to see their own laser spot while designating targets for laser guided munition engagements, providing an extra level of certainty that the correct target and aim-point are designated. Enhanced air-to-ground communication reduces the potential for blue on blue incidents.

== Orders ==
In addition to orders from the US Army, the United Kingdom and six undisclosed international customers have ordered Arrowhead upgrades.

=== US Army ===
A $260 million agreement for the first 55 Lot 1 Arrowhead systems was reached on 11 November 2003. First deliveries were to begin in March 2005, with the first Army unit equipped with Arrowhead to be fielded by June 2005.

The Lockheed Martin Arrowhead team outfitted the first eight AH-64D Apache Longbows with the new day/night vision system at The Boeing Company’s Apache production facility in Mesa, Arizona, during 2005. The Arrowhead-equipped Apache helicopters departed for Fort Hood in two flights beginning June 23, and were officially delivered on 30 June 2005.

The $247 million Lot 2 follow-on production contract for Arrowhead was awarded by the US Army Program Executive Office-Aviation on 26 January 2005. It authorized production of 97 Arrowhead systems for the US Army and foreign military sales customers.

The U.S. Army Aviation and Missile Command awarded Lockheed Martin the Lot 3 follow-on production contract for Arrowhead in June 2006. The $385.6 million agreement authorized production of 219 Arrowhead kits plus spares for the U.S. Army and foreign military sales. Production of the Lot 3 systems was to be in Orlando and Ocala, Florida.

A 2007 order for 158 units in Production Lot 4 was placed for $311 million by the US Army.

The $172 million Production Lot 5 agreement authorized production of 126 Arrowhead kits and/or equivalent unit spares, foreign military sales kits and ground support equipment. With options, this would bring the total number of Arrowhead kits and/or systems to 785.

An order for 55 Lot 6 Arrowhead systems was placed in 2009 for $142 million.

Lockheed Martin announced a $260 million follow-on production contract for Production Lot 7 on 17 August 2010. By the end of Lot 7, which extends production through April 2013, over 1,000 kits will have been delivered.

By 2011, 704 US Army Apaches are to be equipped with the Arrowhead system. In February 2011 the 1,000th M-TADS/PNVS system was delivered to the U.S. Army.

=== International ===
Lockheed Martin installed the first two Arrowhead systems on Royal Netherlands Air Force (RNLAF) AH-64D Apaches during 2007 at Gilze Rijen Airbase in the Netherlands. The contract was awarded in April 2005, and included the delivery of 24 Arrowhead kits as well as spares, specific ground support equipment, training and two Arrowhead kit installations. In August 2009, the Netherlands submitted a request to upgrade its 29 Block I AH-64D Apaches to the Block II configuration, including an upgrade to the Arrowhead system.

A $212 million contract to equip the United Kingdom's 67 AgustaWestland Apache Mk1 helicopters with Arrowhead was placed in May 2005. The contract was awarded by the UK Ministry of Defense (MOD) to prime contractor AgustaWestland, with the first two delivered in November 2008. Deliveries were to conclude in 2010.

On 9 September 2008, Saudi Arabia submitted a request to the US Defense Security Cooperation Agency (DSCA) for 12 Arrowhead systems, along with an order for 12 Block II AH-64D Apache helicopters.

On 22 May 2009, Egypt requested the purchase of 36 Arrowhead systems as part of an order for 12 Block II AH-64D Apache helicopters.
