= AN/APG-78 Longbow =

Military helicopter fire-control radar

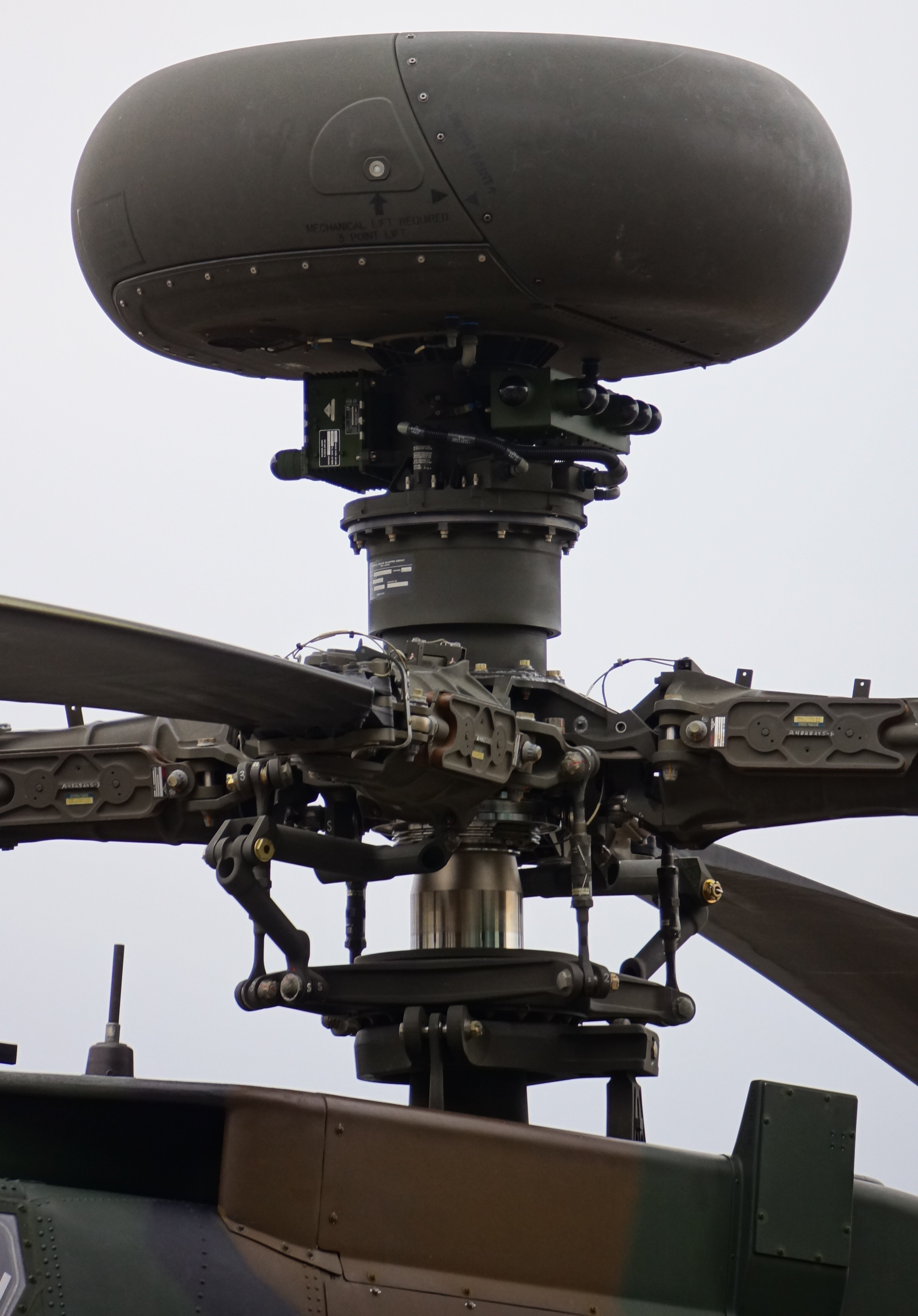
- AN/APG-78 Longbow radar on a JGSDF AH-64D Apache
- Country of origin: United States
- Manufacturer: Lockheed Martin / Northrop Grumman
- Introduced: 1998
- Type: Millimeter-wave fire-control radar
- Frequency: Ka band
- Range: 5.0 mi (8 km)

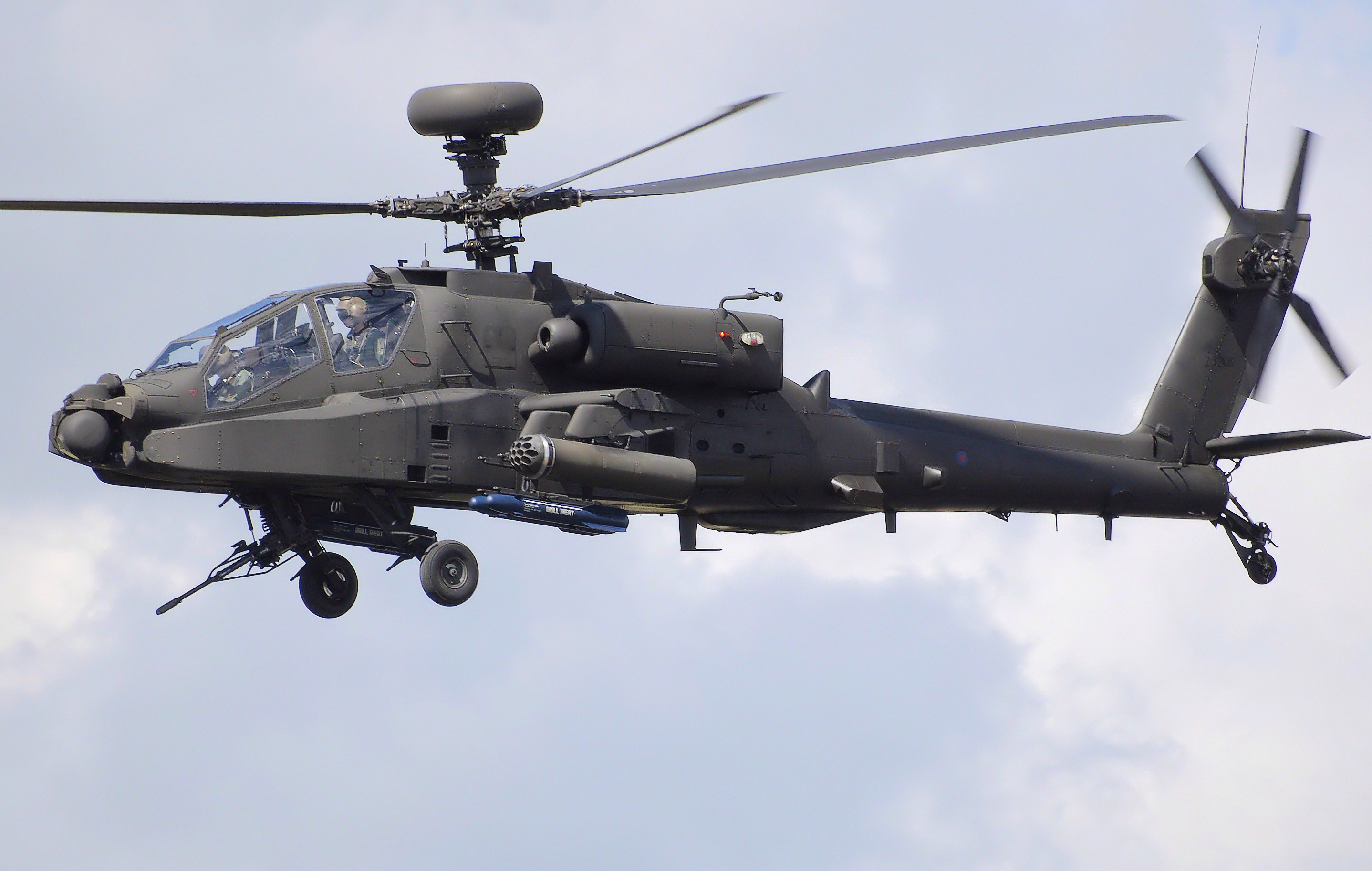
British Army Air Corps AgustaWestland Apache Longbow displays at a UK airshow

The AN/APG-78 Longbow is a millimeter-wave fire-control radar (FCR) system for the AH-64D/E Apache attack helicopter. It was initially developed in the 1980s as the Airborne Adverse Weather Weapon System (AAWWS) as part of the Multi-Stage Improvement Program (MSIP) to enhance the AH-64A. By 1990, both AAWWS and MSIP were renamed Longbow. The radar is produced by Longbow LLC, a joint venture of Lockheed Martin and Northrop Grumman.

In accordance with the Joint Electronics Type Designation System (JETDS), the "AN/APG-78" designation represents the 78th design of an Army-Navy airborne electronic device for radar fire-control equipment. The JETDS system also now is used to name all Department of Defense electronic systems.

== Description ==
The AN/APG-78 Longbow is a millimeter-wave fire-control radar (FCR) target acquisition system and the Radar Frequency Interferometer (RFI), which are housed in a dome located above the main rotor. The radome's raised position enables target detection while the helicopter is behind obstacles (e.g. terrain, trees or buildings). The APG-78 is capable of simultaneously tracking up to 128 targets and engaging up to 16 at once; an attack can be initiated within 30 seconds. A radio modem integrated with the sensor suite allows data to be shared with ground units and other Apaches, allowing them to fire on targets detected by a single helicopter.

The updated AN/APG-78 radar for the AH-64E Guardian has overwater capabilities, potentially enabling naval strikes.

== Applications ==
- AgustaWestland Apache Longbow
- Bell AH-1Z Viper (option)
- Boeing AH-64D Apache Longbow
- Boeing AH-64E Apache Guardian
- Boeing–Sikorsky RAH-66 Comanche (canceled)

== See also ==
- List of radars
- Searchwater
- Seaspray (radar)
- List of military electronics of the United States
