= No. 673 Squadron AAC =

WWII glider squadron

No. 673 Squadron AAC No. 673 Squadron RAF
- Active: 1 January 1945 – 25 October 1945 (RAF); April 1996 - December 2020; June 2022 - present
- Country: United Kingdom
- Branch: British Army
- Size: 35 permanent staff, 12 Students
- Part of: 7 (Training) Regiment Army Air Corps
- Garrison/HQ: Middle Wallop Flying Station

Commanders
- Colonel of the Regiment: The Prince of Wales

Insignia
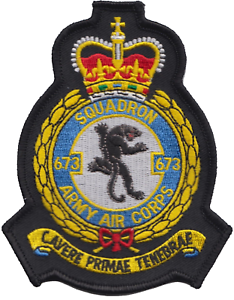
- Identification symbol

Aircraft flown
- Attack helicopter: Boeing AH64E Apache

No. 673 Squadron AAC is a squadron of the British Army's Army Air Corps. It was formerly No. 674 Squadron RAF, a glider squadron of the Royal Air Force, active during the Second World War within British India.

== History ==
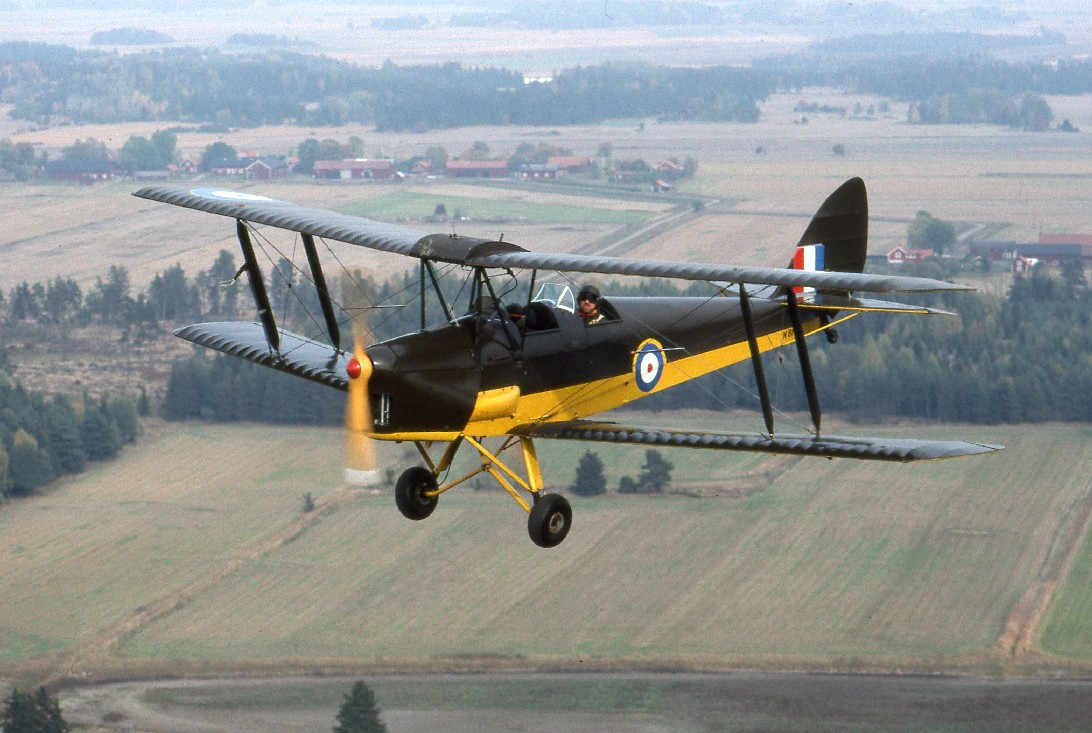
A de Havilland Tiger Moth restored in wartime colours.

No. 673 Squadron was formed at Bikram, Patna in (then) British India on 1 January 1945 as a glider squadron, with the intention of being used for airborne operations by South East Asia Command. It continued to train, as part of No. 344 Wing RAF, until the surrender of Japan, when it became surplus to requirements; the squadron was disbanded on 25 October 1945 at Kargi Road.

== Army Air Corps ==
No. 673 Squadron AAC was formed at Middle Wallop, on 1 April 2009 the squadron joined 7 Regiment AAC (Flying). It was disbanded on 11 December 2020, and was reformed on 8 June 2022 with the arrival of 2 new AH-64E Apache Guardians arrived.

== Aircraft operated ==
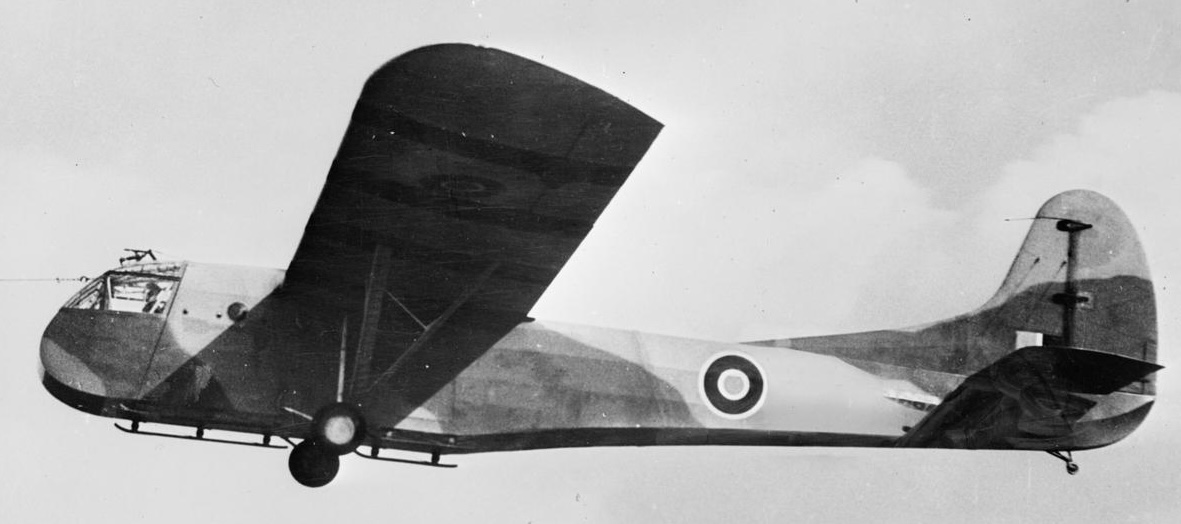
A Waco CG-4 (Hadrian) in British service.

Aircraft operated by No. 673 Squadron RAF and 673 Squadron Army Air Corps
| From | To | Aircraft | Variant |
|---|---|---|---|
| January 1945 | September 1945 | Waco Hadrian | |
| January 1945 | September 1945 | de Havilland Tiger Moth | Mk.II |
| April 1996 | 2024 | AgustaWestland Apache | AH1 |
| 2024 | present | Boeing AH-64 Apache | AH-64E |

== Squadron bases ==
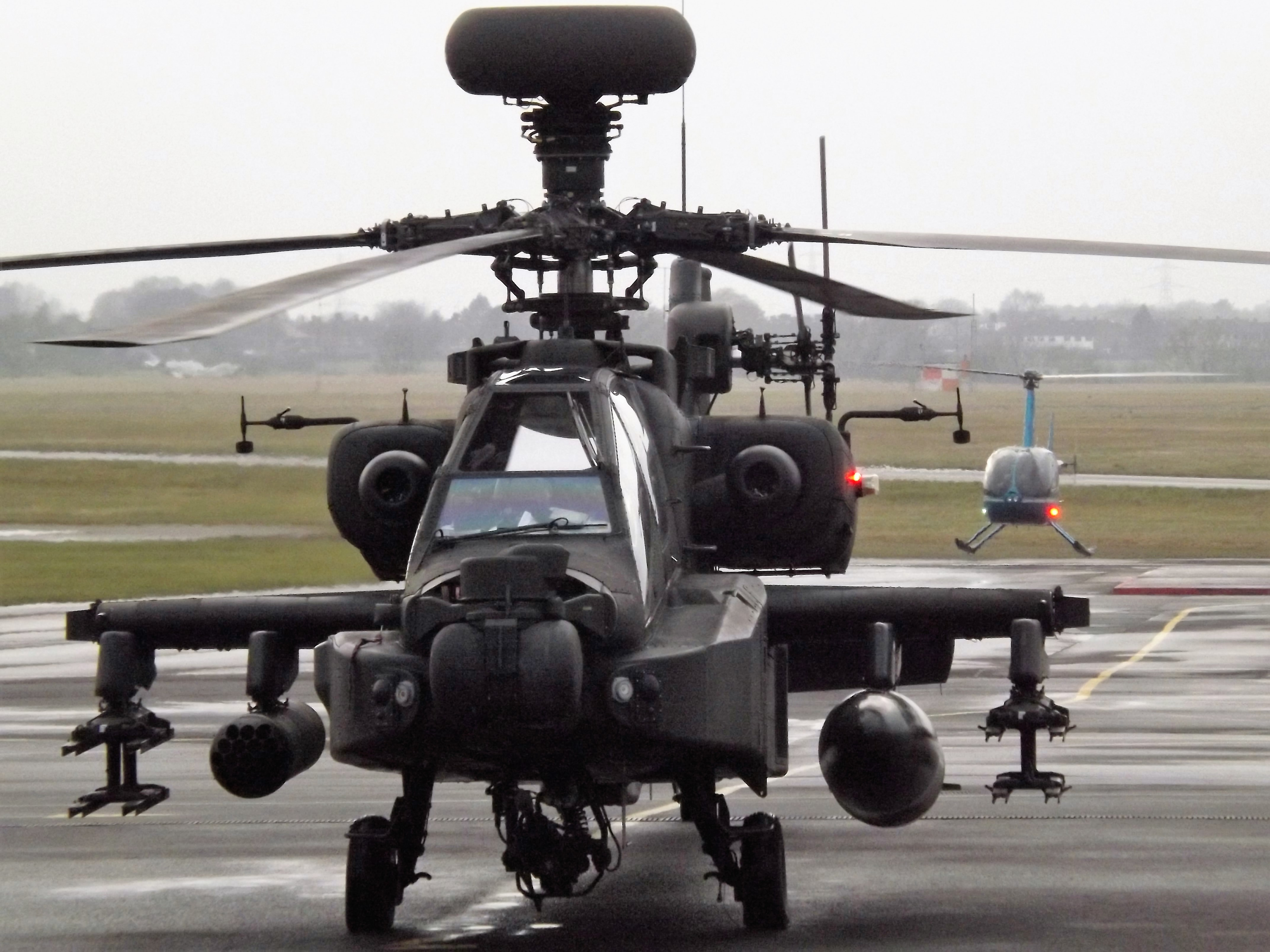
AgustaWestland Apache in British service.

Bases and airfields used by No. 673 Squadron RAF
| From | To | Base |
|---|---|---|
| 27 January 1945 | 19 February 1945 | Bikram, Bihar, British India |
| 19 February 1945 | 10 April 1945 | Belgaum, Karnataka, British India |
| 10 April 1945 | 26 August 1945 | Bikram, Bihar, British India |
| 26 August 1945 | 16 September 1945 | Tilda, Chhattisgarh, British India |
| 16 September 1945 | 25 October 1945 | Kargi Road, Chhattisgarh, British India |
