= No. 1325 Flight RAF =

Royal Air Force transport squadron

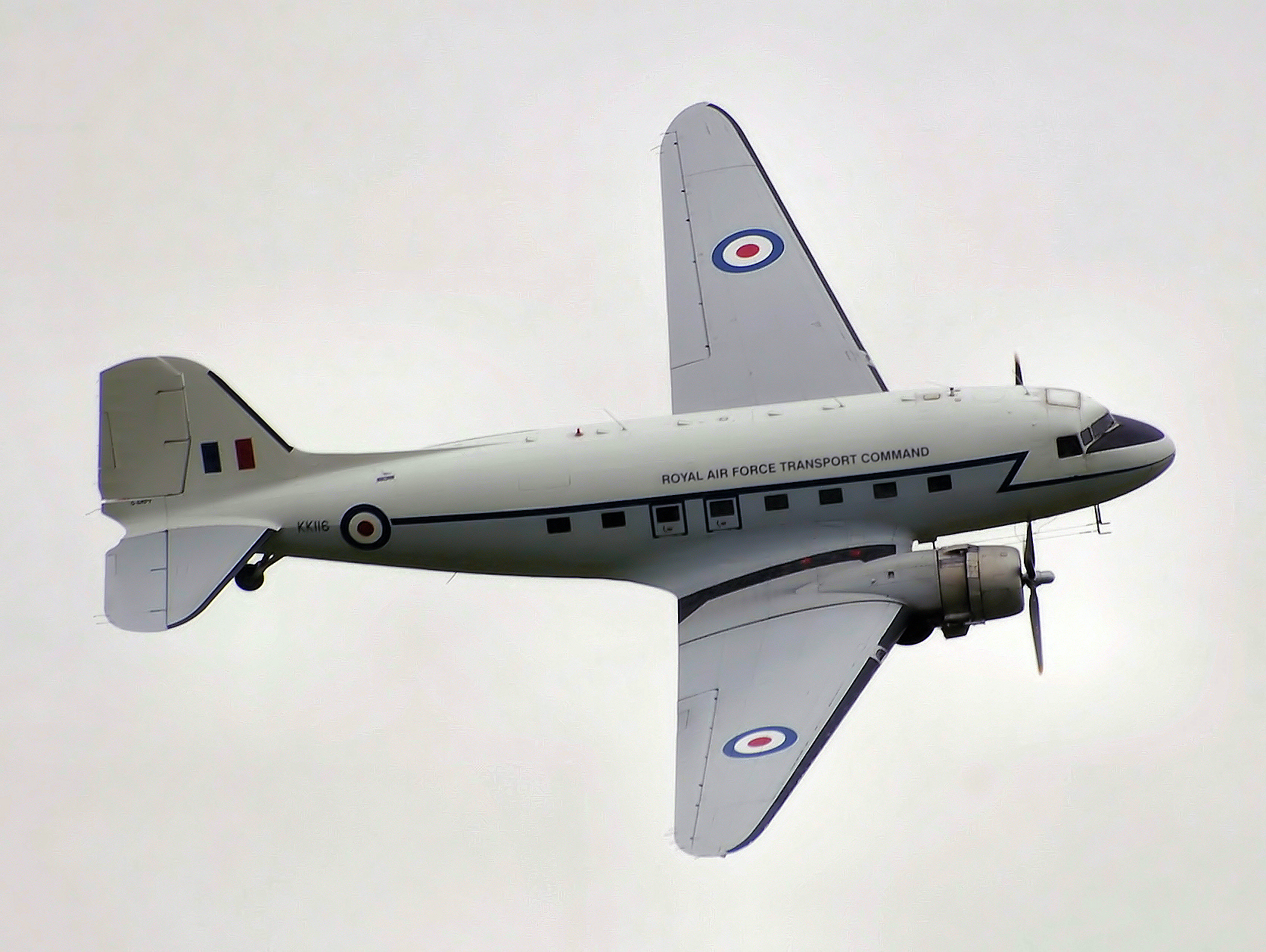
- Douglas C-47B, a Dakota C.4 of the Air Atlantique Classic Flight, at the 2008 Kemble Open Day, Kemble Airport, Gloucestershire, England. RAF code KK116, civil registration G-AMPY.
- Active: 1 Aug 1956 – 1 May 1960
- Role: Transport
- Nickname(s): Christmas Airways

Insignia
- Squadron Badge heraldry: No known badge
- Squadron Codes: No known identification code for the flight is known to have been carried

No. 1325 (Transport) Flight comprising three Douglas Dakota aircraft, formed at RAF Dishforth, North Yorkshire, on 1 August 1956 to support Operation Buffalo and Operation Antler British nuclear tests at Maralinga. 1325 Flight was soon relocated to Christmas Island (Kiritimati) to support the Grapple series of nuclear tests in that remote Pacific region.

Squadron Leader W.J. (Joe) Hurst was placed in command of 1325 Flight and was awarded the AFC for his exemplary service. He was CO for 'Grapple' and part of 'Grapple X'. The CO for the remaining 'Grapple X' and all 'Grapple Y' was a Squadron Leader Wood.

While at Christmas Island, regular supply flights were made to support the weather and observation sites located at Fanning and Malden Islands for the nuclear tests. Because some islands had no landing strips, 1325 Flight devised a "bouncing palette" system (similar to Barnes Wallis’s bouncing bomb) to deliver supplies. Occasional flights were also made to Nandi in Fiji, Faleolo (Apia) in Western Samoa, Rarotonga Island, and New Caledonia Island.

Because of limited maintenance facilities at Christmas Island, the Dakota aircraft were rotated to the de Havilland aircraft works at Bankstown, Sydney, Australia for "Base servicing". On these flights, the 1325 Flight Dakotas were routed via Canton Island, Fiji and Brisbane. The 1325 Flight Dakotas had extra fuel tanks mounted within the fuselage to extend the range to 2,400 miles. The Dakotas had servicing facilities on the Island. While at Christmas Island 1325 Flight became known as "Christmas Airways", a nickname created by the CO, Squadron Leader W J Hurst, and had that legend painted on both sides of the aircraft fuselage. The ground crew serviced various civilian aircraft ferrying food to the island. The ground crew were merged with the Transport Command Servicing Team groundcrew, who serviced the RAF Hastings aircraft which were used to transport service personnel as well as food that was flown from Hickam USAF field in Honolulu.

Once the tests had been completed and operations at Christmas Island terminated, 1325 flight was disbanded at RAF Changi in Singapore, on 1 May 1960.

== Aircraft operated ==
Aircraft operated by no. 1325 Flight RAF, data from
From	To	Aircraft	Version	Serial/Name
1 August 1956	1 May 1960	Douglas Dakota	C.4	KN434 "Polynesian Princess"; KN598 "Coral Queen"; KJ945 "Island Romance"

Another Dakota Mk4, KN649, not on the strength of 1325 Flight but being used to train its aircrew, crashed near RAF Dishforth on 27 August 1957 with the loss of three crew members. Loaned to Dishforth for this training program, the aircraft was based at Bovingdon where it had been used as personal transport by the C in C Coastal Command.

== Flight bases ==
Bases and airfields used by no. 1325 Flight RAF, data from
From	To	Base
1 August 1956	25 January 1957	RAF Dishforth, North Yorkshire
25 January 1957	February 1957	en route to Christmas Island
February 1957	June 1958	in South Australia with 3 Dakotas
June 1958	28 November 1959	RAF Kiritimati, Christmas Island
28 November 1959	1 May 1960	RAF Changi, Singapore
