= TADS/PNVS =

American helicopter sensor and targeting unit

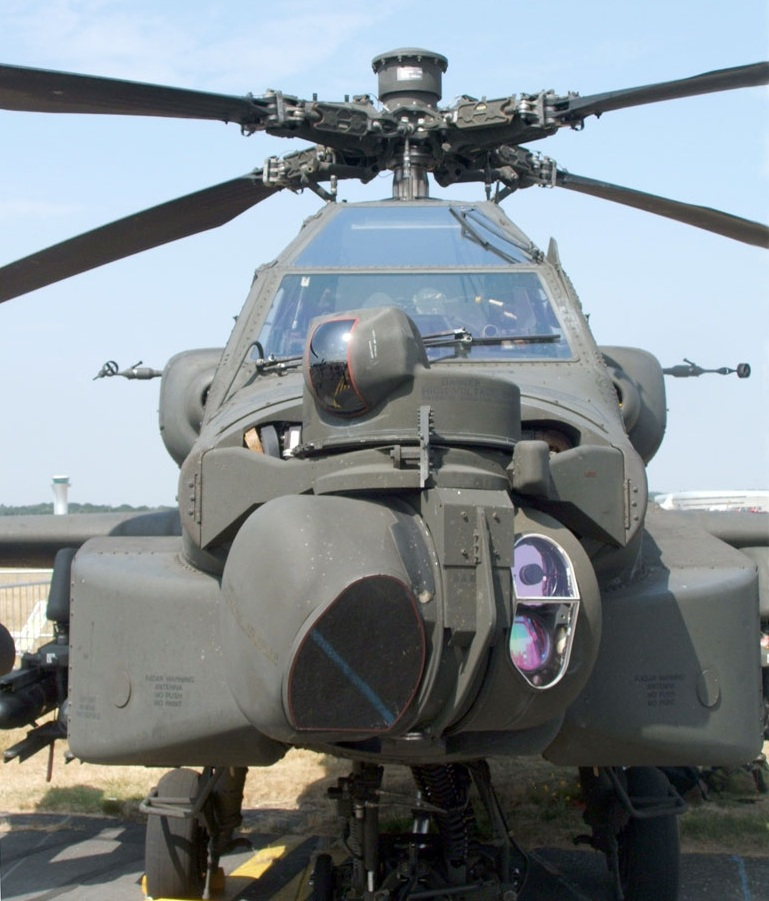
TADS / PNVS on a Boeing AH-64 Apache helicopter

The Target Acquisition and Designation Sights, Pilot Night Vision System (TADS/PNVS) is the combined sensor and targeting unit fitted to the Boeing AH-64 Apache helicopter. Both systems are independent, but housed together.

Lockheed Martin signed the original TADS/PNVS production contract on 30 April 1982, and the first TADS/PNVS system was fielded in 1983.

== Target Acquisition and Designation Sights (TADS) ==
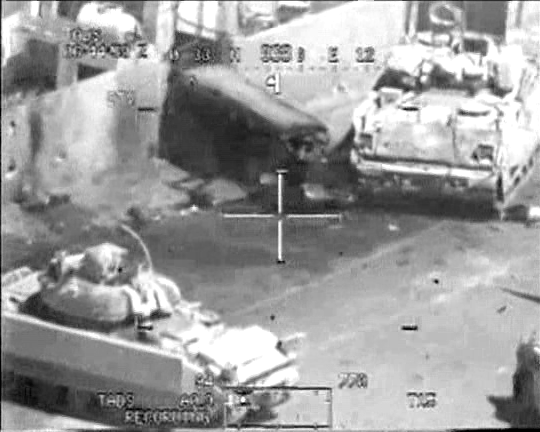
Images from the leaked July 12, 2007, Baghdad airstrike footage

TADS contains stabilized electro-optical sensors, a laser rangefinder and laser target designator. Designated AN/ASQ-170, the TADS assembly can rotate +/− 120 degrees in azimuth, +30/−80 degrees in elevation and can move independently of the PNVS. The movements of TADS can be 'slaved' to the head movements of the helicopter crew to point where they are looking. This allows images from TADS to be projected onto the crew helmet-mounted optical sights, overlaid upon their view of the cockpit and battle space.

TADS contains a thermographic camera and a monochrome daylight television camera. With the improvements planned with M-TADS in the block III level AH-64D, the monochrome TV-camera is planned to be replaced with a full color camera.

It also once contained direct-view optics (DVO) which the copilot/gunner (CPG) could see through the Optical Relay Tube (ORT). But in recently fielded models of the AH-64D the ORT along with the DVO has been removed as it was rarely used. It has been replaced in the co-pilot's cockpit by a third Multi Purpose Display.

== Pilot Night Vision System ==
Mounted above the TADS, the Pilot Night Vision System (PNVS), designated AN/AAQ-11, contains an infrared camera slaved to the head movements of the pilot. PNVS can rotate +/− 90 degrees in azimuth and +20/−45 degrees in elevation. PNVS has a high rate of movement (120° per second) so as to accurately match the head movements of the pilot.

== Arrowhead upgrade ==
As of 2005 a program was under way to upgrade the U.S. Apache fleet to the Modernized-TADS/PNVS (M-TADS/PNVS) standard, also known as Arrowhead. This upgrade is claimed to give a 150% performance and reliability improvement, while reducing costs through lower maintenance requirements.
