= Jugroom Fort =

Fort in Helmand Province, Afghanistan

Coordinates: 31°4′0″N 64°10′1″E

Jugroom Fort is a complex of fortified buildings south-west of Garmsir in Helmand Province, Afghanistan, on the east bank of the Helmand River. The fort is several centuries old, and in 2007 it was used as a Taliban base.

== Operation Glacier ==
British forces assaulted the fort on 15 January 2007. During the attack, Royal Marine Lance-Corporal Mathew Ford was killed by friendly fire. After a rescue mission by Apache helicopter gunships, two of the pilots, including author Ed Macy, were awarded the Military Cross and the other two pilots, including Captain Tom O'Malley, the Distinguished Flying Cross. The action became known as one of those in Operation Herrick of military failure, despite the application of huge firepower and considerable personal bravery.

The fort had been under surveillance for two months and was thought to contain high-value Taliban leaders. After a diversionary attack to the North, the fort was bombarded by 155 mm heavy artillery and bombed by B1 Lancers.

The assault began as 200 men from 45 Commando crossed the river in amphibious Viking and Scimitar light tanks, supported by Apache gunships and 105 mm artillery. A Forward Air Controller or JTAC within the assault group co-ordinated air support. Despite considerable firepower, the Taliban within the fort continued resisting. One of the Viking machine gunners opened fire on a muzzle flash, despite it being outside their arc of fire, and caused a friendly fire incident on five of the Marines, four of whom were then evacuated as casualties. The continuing resistance and "shortfalls in combat power" led to the Marines retreating across the river.

A head-count on the far side of the river revealed that Lance-Corporal Ford was missing. Aerial reconnaissance images from an Apache showed that he was still within the fort. A rescue attempt was mounted, an Apache pilot suggesting an alternative to another land attack: two Apaches would carry a handful of Marines, riding on the outside of the helicopters, each on one of the stub-wing weapons pylons. Although not a regular tactic, the pylons are strong, have tie-down points fitted and are recognised for use with casevac or impromptu cargo moves.

The two Apaches returned to the fort. Air support for the rescue attempt was to be provided again by B1s, dropping precision-guided JDAMs, and supported by A-10s. A widely circulated report afterwards described how only prompt action by one of the A-10 pilots avoided a further serious friendly-fire incident, when the JTAC passed the wrong GPS coordinates to the B1 crew for their attack.

Lance-Corporal Ford was located and recovered, but he died from his wounds before reaching safety.

Jugroom Fort was cleared in May 2008, by Charlie Company, 1st Battalion, 6th Marines USMC, helping the re-opening of a route through to Pakistan.

== Further listening and viewing ==
- "The Fort". The History Podcast (Podcast). BBC Radio 4. 8–19 September 2025. A 2½-hour podcast telling the story of Operation Glacier in the words of the British participants and contemporary BBC news reports.
- ""Soldiers First", Rescue at Jugroom Fort". David Rowlands. Painting of Operation Glacier by a British war artist.
