= List of RAF squadron codes =

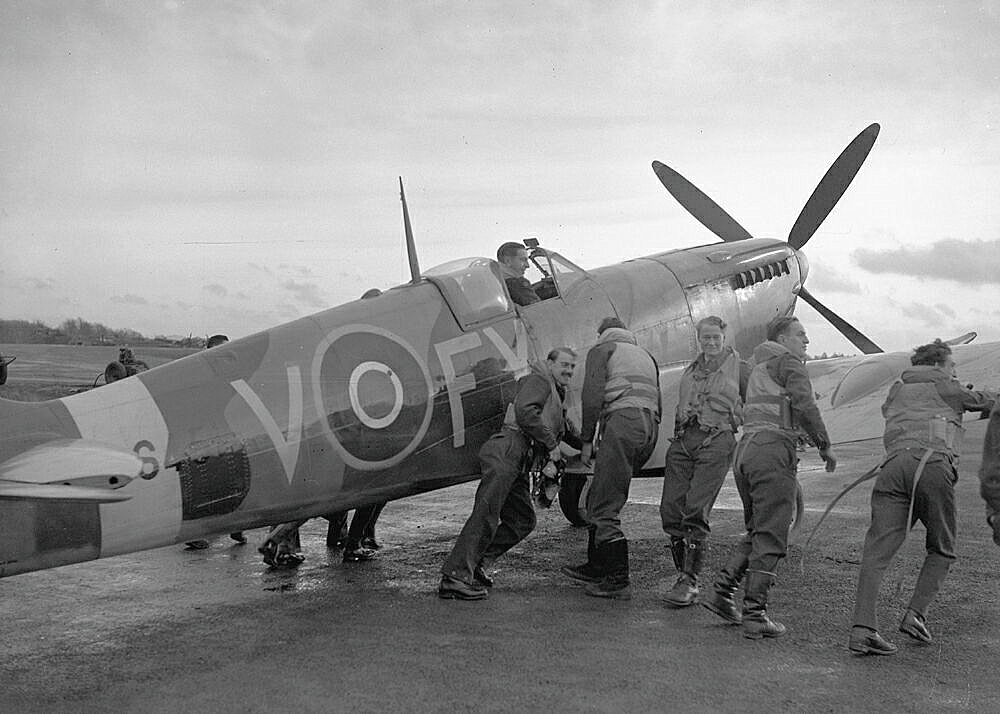
Pilots of 611 (West Lancashire) Squadron lend a hand pushing an early Supermarine Spitfire Mark IXb at RAF Biggin Hill in late 1942. Note the 611 unit identifier 'FY' and the individual aircraft identifier letter 'V'.

Most units of the Royal Air Force (RAF) are identified by a two character alphabetical or alpha- numeric combination squadron code. Usually, that code is painted on the aircraft belonging to that squadron. The squadron code is usually presented along with an individual letter or character to form a call sign for the particular aircraft. Location of the call sign combination has usually been on the rear fuselage next to the RAF roundel.

In instances when an unusually large numbers of aircraft comprise the squadron, multiple squadron codes have been used.

Other air forces, especially those from other Commonwealth countries, have often used similar systems of identification. During the Second World War, when units from other air forces were attached to the RAF; such as the Article XV squadrons (also known as '400 series squadrons'), their squadron codes were often changed, to avoid confusion with RAF units.

== Squadron codes ==
=== A-E ===
RAF squadron codes
squadron code	unit	Notes
A	No. 1 Photographic Reconnaissance Unit RAF	1 PRU
A	No. 111 Operational Training Unit RAF	111 OTU
A	No. 112 Squadron RAF	Jul 1953 – Jan 1954
A	No. 118 Squadron RAF	Apr 1951 - Mar 1955
A	No. 120 Squadron RAF	120 Sqn
A	No. 14 (Advanced) Flying Training School	14 (A) FTS
A	No. 14 Squadron RAF	14 Sqn
A	No. 19 Flying Training School RAF	19 FTS
A	No. 201 Squadron RAF	201 Sqn
A	No. 202 Squadron RAF	202 Sqn
A	No. 217 Squadron RAF	217 Sqn
A	No. 229 Operational Conversion Unit RAF	229 OCU
A	No. 266 Squadron RAF	266 Sqn
A	No. 3 Squadron RAF	3 Sqn
A	No. 39 Squadron RAF	38 Sqn
A	No. 4 Flying Training School RAF	4 FTS
A	No. 42 Squadron RAF	42 Sqn
A	No. 43 Squadron RAF	43 Sqn
A	No. 5 Squadron RAF	5 Sqn
A	No. 541 Squadron RAF	541 Sqn
A	No. 56 Squadron RAF	56 Sqn
A	No. 72 Squadron RAF	72 Sqn
A	No. 9 Squadron RAF	9 Sqn
A	No. 94 Squadron RAF	94 Sqn
A	RAF College Flying Training School	RAF Coll FTS
A2	No. 514 Squadron RAF	514 Sqn
A3	No. 1653 Conversion Unit RAF	1653 CU
A3	No. 230 Operational Conversion Unit RAF	230 OCU
A4	No. 115 Squadron RAF	115 Sqn
A4	No. 195 Squadron RAF	195 Sqn
A5	No. 3 Lancaster Finishing School RAF	3 LFS
A6	No. 257 Squadron RAF	257 Sqn
A9	Station Flight RAF Woodbridge	
AA	No. 134 Squadron RAF	134 Sqn
AA	No. 75 (New Zealand) Squadron RAF	75 (NZ) Sqn
AB	No. 1557 (Radio Aids Training) Flight RAF	1557 (RAT) Flt
AB	No. 423 Squadron RCAF	423 Sqn RCAF (sometimes 423 (RCAF) Sqn)
AC	No. 138 Squadron RAF	138 Sqn
AD	No. 113 Squadron RAF	113 Sqn
AD	No. 251 Squadron RAF	251 Sqn
AD	No. 60 Squadron RAF	60 Sqn
AE	No. 1409 (Meteorological) Flight RAF	1409 (Met) Flt
AE	No. 402 Squadron RCAF	402 Sqn RCAF (sometimes 402 (RCAF) Sqn)
AF	Air Fighting Development Establishment	AFDE
AF	Air Fighting Development Unit	AFDU
AF	No. 294 Squadron RAF	294 Sqn
AF	No. 607 Squadron RAF	607 Sqn
AG	No. 197 Squadron RAF	197 Sqn
AH	No. 332 (Norway) Squadron RAF	332 (Norwegian) Sqn
AI	No. 20 Operational Training Unit RAF	20 OTU
AJ	No. 617 Squadron RAF	1943-1946,
AJ	Station Flight RAF North Luffenham	
AK	No. 1657 Conversion Unit RAF	1657 CU
AK	No. 213 Squadron RAF	213 Sqn
AL	No. 429 Squadron RCAF	429 Sqn RCAF, sometimes 429 (RCAF) Sqn
AL	No. 79 Squadron RAF	79 Sqn
AM	No. 14 Operational Training Unit RAF	14 OTU
AM	No. 219 Squadron RAF	219 Sqn
AN	No. 13 Squadron RAF	13 Sqn
AN	No. 417 Squadron RCAF	417 Sqn RCAF (sometimes 417 (RCAF) Sqn)
AN	Station Flight RAF Great Dunmow	
AO	No. 211 Squadron RAF	211 Sqn
AO	No. 267 Squadron RAF	267 Sqn
AP	No. 130 Squadron RAF	130 Sqn
AP	No. 186 Squadron RAF	186 Sqn
AQ	No. 267 Squadron RAF	267 Sqn
AR	No. 309 (Polish) Squadron RAF	309 Polish Sqn
AR	No. 460 Squadron RAAF	460 Sqn RAAF (sometimes 460 RAAF Sqn)
AS	No. 100 Squadron RAF	100 Sqn
AS	No. 166 Squadron RAF	166 Sqn
AS	No. 176 Squadron RAF	176 Sqn
AS	No. 83 Squadron RAF	83 Sqn
AS	No. 97 Squadron RAF	97 Sqn
AT	No. 13 Operational Training Unit RAF	13 OTU
AT	No. 299 Squadron RAF	299 Sqn
AT	No. 60 Operational Training Unit RAF	60 OTU
AU	No. 148 Squadron RAF	148 Sqn
AU	No. 279 Squadron RAF	279 Sqn
AU	No. 421 Squadron RCAF	421 Sqn RCAF (sometimes 421 (RCAF) Sqn)
AV	No. 121 (Eagle) Squadron RAF	121 (Eagle) Sqn
AW	No. 42 Squadron RAF	42 Sqn
AW	No. 504 Squadron RAF	504 Sqn
AW	No. 664 Squadron RAF	664 Sqn
AX	No. 161 Squadron RAF	161 Sqn
AX	1 Squadron SAAF	1 Sqn SAAF
AX	11 Operational Training Unit SAAF	11 OTU SAAF
AX	No. 202 Squadron RAF	202 Sqn
AY	No. 110 Squadron RCAF	110 Sqn RCAF (1939–40)*
AY	No. 17 Operational Training Unit RAF	17 OTU
AZ	No. 234 Squadron RAF	234 Sqn
AZ	No. 627 Squadron RAF	627 Sqn
B	Air Training Squadron RAF	AT Sqn
B	Canberra Standardisation and Training Flight RAF	CST Flt
B	Helicopter Operational Conversion Flight RAF	HOCF
B	No. 11 Squadron RAF	11 Sqn
B	No. 111 Squadron RAF	111 Sqn
B	No. 14 Squadron RAF	14 Sqn
B	No. 145 Squadron RAF	145 Sqn
B	No. 17 Squadron RAF	17 Sqn
B	No. 18 Squadron RAF	18 Sqn
B	No. 19 Flying Training School RAF	19 FTS
B	No. 2 Squadron RAF	2 Sqn
B	No. 203 Squadron RAF	203 Sqn
B	No. 206 Squadron RAF	206 Sqn
B	No. 224 Squadron RAF	224 Sqn
B	No. 230 Squadron RAF	230 Sqn
B	No. 231 Operational Conversion Unit RAF	231 OCU
B	No. 240 Operational Conversion Unit RAF	240 OCU
B	No. 269 Squadron RAF	269 Sqn
B	No. 29 Squadron RAF	29 Sqn
B	No. 4 Flying Training School RAF	4 FTS
B	No. 4 Squadron RAF	4 Sqn
B	No. 5 (Pilots) Advanced Flying Unit RAF	5 (P) AFU
B	No. 5 Squadron RAF	5 Sqn
B	No. 56 Squadron RAF	56 Sqn
B	No. 87 Squadron RAF	87 Sqn
B	RAF College Flying Training School	RAF Coll FTS
B	Tri-National Tornado Training Establishment	TTTE
B	Wessex Training Flight RAF	WT Flt
B3	Station Flight RAF Wyton	
B4	No. 282 Squadron RAF	282 Sqn
B6	Station Flight RAF Spilsby	
B7	Station Flight RAF Waddington	
B8	Station Flight RAF Woodhall Spa	
B9	No. 1562 Flight RAF	1562 Flt
BA	No. 277 Squadron RAF	277 Sqn
BA	No. 125 Squadron RCAF	125 Sqn RCAF*
BB	No. 226 Operational Conversion Unit RAF	226 OCU
BB	No. 27 Operational Training Unit RAF	27 OTU
BB	No. 347 (French) Squadron RAF	347 French Sqn
BC	No. 511 Squadron RAF	511 Sqn
BC	Photographic Reconnaissance Development Unit RAF	PRDU
BD	Air Observation Post School RAF	AOPS
BD	Light Aeroplane School RAF	LAS
BD	No. 227 Operational Conversion Unit RAF	227 OCU
BD	No. 43 Operational Training Unit RAF	43 OTU
BE	No. 284 Squadron RAF	284 Sqn
BE	No. 8 Operational Training Unit RAF	8 OTU
BF	No. 14 Squadron RCAF	14 Sqn RCAF*
BF	No. 28 Squadron RAF	28 Sqn
BF	No. 54 Operational Training Unit RAF	54 OTU
BG	No. 606 Squadron RAF	606 Sqn
BG	No. 660 Squadron RAF	660 Sqn
BH	No. 215 Squadron RAF	215 Sqn
BH	No. 228 Squadron RAF	228 Sqn
BH	No. 300 Polish Bomber Squadron	300 Polish Sqn
BI	Station Flight RAF Holme-on-Spalding Moor	
BJ	No. 271 Squadron RAF	271 Sqn
BJ	No. 334 (Norway) Squadron RAF	334 Norwegian Sqn
BK	No. 115 Squadron RAF	115 Sqn
BK	Southern Sector Communication Flight RAF	SS Comm Flt
BL	No. 1656 Conversion Unit RAF	1656 CU
BL	No. 40 Squadron RAF	40 Sqn
BL	No. 609 Squadron RAF	609 Sqn
BM	No. 308 Polish Fighter Squadron	308 Polish Sqn
BM	No. 433 Squadron RCAF	433 Sqn RCAF (sometimes 433 (RCAF) Sqn)
BN	No. 1401 Flight RAF	1401 Flt
BN	No. 170 Squadron RAF	170 Sqn
BN	No. 240 Squadron RAF	240 Sqn
BN	No. 618 Squadron RAF	618 Sqn
BO	No. 630 Squadron RAF	630 Sqn
BP	No. 457 Squadron RAAF (June 1941 – March 1942)	457 Sqn RAAF (sometimes 457 RAAF Sqn)
BP	No. 519 Squadron RAF	519 Sqn
BQ	No. 451 Squadron RAAF	451 Sqn RAAF (sometimes 451 RAAF Sqn)
BQ	No. 509 Squadron RAF	509 Sqn (not formed)
BQ	No. 550 Squadron RAF	550 Sqn
BQ	No. 600 Squadron RAF	600 Sqn
BR	No. 184 Squadron RAF	184 Sqn
BS	No. 120 Squadron RAF	120 Sqn
BS	No. 148 Squadron RAF	148 Sqn
BS	No. 160 Squadron RAF	160 Sqn
BS	No. 1651 Conversion Unit RAF	1651 CU
BT	No. 113 Squadron RAF	113 Sqn
BT	No. 252 Squadron RAF	252 Sqn
BT	No. 30 Operational Training Unit RAF	30 OTU
BTU	Bombing Trials Unit RAF	BTU
BU	No. 214 Squadron RAF	214 Sqn
BU	No. 227 Squadron RAF	227 Sqn
BV	No. 305 (Polish) Squadron RAF	305 Polish Sqn
BW	No. 58 Squadron RAF	58 Sqn
BX	No. 86 Squadron RAF	86 Sqn
BY	No. 23 Operational Training Unit RAF	23 OTU
BY	No. 255 Squadron RAF	255 Sqn
BY	No. 58 Squadron RAF	58 Sqn
BY	No. 59 Squadron RAF	59 Sqn
BZ	No. 107 Squadron RAF	107 Sqn
BZ	No. 82 Operational Training Unit RAF	82 OTU
C	Air Training Squadron RAF	AT Sqn
C	No. 100 Squadron RAF	100 Sqn
C	No. 111 Operational Training Unit RAF	111 OTU
C	No. 1563 Flight RAF	1563 Flt
C	No. 17 Squadron RAF	17 Sqn
C	No. 19 Flying Training School RAF	19 FTS
C	No. 2 Tactical Air Force Communication Squadron RAF, No. 3 Group Communication Flight RAF	2 TAF, 3 Gp Comm Flt
C	No. 20 Squadron RAF	20 Sqn
C	No. 208 Squadron RAF	208 Sqn
C	No. 216 Squadron RAF	216 Sqn
C	No. 228 Operational Conversion Unit RAF	228 OCU
C	No. 236 Operational Conversion Unit RAF	236 OCU
C	No. 237 Operational Conversion Unit RAF	237 OCU
C	No. 240 Operational Conversion Unit RAF	240 OCU
C	No. 33 Squadron RAF	33 Sqn
C	No. 4 Squadron RAF	4 Sqn
C	No. 5 Squadron RAF	5 Sqn
C	RAF College Flying Training School	RAF Coll FTS
C2	Bomber Command Instructors School RAF	BCIS
C5	Station Flight RAF Tibenham	
C6	No. 51 Squadron RAF	51 Sqn
C8	No. 640 Squadron RAF	640 Sqn
CA	No. 189 Squadron RAF	189 Sqn
CA	3 Squadron SAAF	3 Sqn SAAF
CB	Metropolitan Communication Squadron RAF	Met Comm Sqn
CB	No. 31 Squadron RAF	31 Sqn
CC	Station Flight RAF Holmsley South	
CE	No. 5 Lancaster Finishing School RAF	5 LFS
CF	No. 625 Squadron RAF	625 Sqn
CG	Station Flight RAF Binbrook	
CH	Station Flight RAF Swinderby	
CJ	No. 203 Squadron RAF	203 Sqn
CL	Station Flight RAF Little Staughton	
CM	No. 107 Operational Training Unit RAF	107 OTU
CM	No. 1333 Conversion Unit RAF	1333 CU
CM	No. 42 Group Communication Flight RAF	42 Gp Comm Flt
CO	No. 84 Operational Training Unit RAF	84 OTU
CP	Station Flight RAF Topcliffe	
CR	No. 162 Squadron RAF	162 Sqn
CS	No. 513 Squadron RAF	513 Sqn
CS	Station Flight RAF Upwood	
CV	Station Flight RAF Tuddenham	
CV	No. 3 Squadron RAAF (1941–45)	3 Sqn RAAF (although often referred to as 3 RAAF Sqn)
CX	No. 14 Squadron RAF	14 Sqn
CY	Station Flight RAF Ludford Magna	
CZ	No. 222 Squadron RAF	222 Sqn
CZ	No. 84 Operational Training Unit RAF	84 OTU
D	Lightning Training Flight RAF	LTF
D	No. 11 Squadron RAF	11 Sqn
D	No. 14 (Advanced) Flying Training School	14 (A)FTS
D	No. 15 Squadron RAF	15 Sqn
D	No. 19 Flying Training School RAF	19 FTS
D	No. 230 Squadron RAF	230 Sqn
D	No. 234 Squadron RAF	234 Sqn
D	No. 235 Operational Conversion Unit RAF	235 OCU
D	No. 31 Squadron RAF	31 Sqn
D	No. 4 Flying Training School RAF	4 FTS
D	No. 7 Flying Training School RAF	7 FTS
D	RAF College Flying Training School	RAF Coll FTS
D2	No. 1606 Flight RAF	1606 Flt
D4	No. 620 Squadron RAF	620 Sqn
D6	Station Flight RAF Hethel	
D8	No. 22 Maintenance Unit RAF	22 MU
D8	No. 5 Ferry Pool RAF	5 FP
DA	No. 210 Squadron RAF	210 Sqn
DA	No. 273 Maintenance Unit RAF	273 MU
DB	2 Squadron SAAF	2 Sqn SAAF
DB	No. 229 Squadron RAF	229 Sqn
DB	No. 411 Squadron RCAF	411 Sqn RCAF (sometimes 411 (RCAF) Sqn)
DC	Station Flight RAF Oakington	
DD	No. 15 Squadron RAAF	15 Sqn RAAF*
DD	No. 22 Operational Training Unit RAF	22 OTU
DD	No. 45 Squadron RAF	45 Sqn
DE	No. 61 Operational Training Unit RAF	61 OTU
DE	No. 86 Squadron RAF	86 Sqn
DF	Central Bomber Establishment RAF	CBE
DF	No. 221 Squadron RAF	221 Sqn
DG	No. 150 Squadron RAF	150 Sqn
DG	No. 155 Squadron RAF	155 Sqn
DG	No. 422 Squadron RCAF	422 Sqn RCAF (sometimes 422 (RCAF) Sqn)
DH	No. 1664 Conversion Unit RAF	1664 CU
DH	No. 540 Squadron RAF	540 Sqn
DI	Station Flight RAF Kemble	
DJ	No. 15 Squadron RAF	15 Sqn
DJ	No. 612 Squadron RAF	12 Sqn
DK	No. 32 Operational Training Unit RAF	32 OTU
DL	No. 421 (Reconnaissance) Flight RAF	421 Flt
DL	No. 54 Squadron RAF (1943–45)	54 (RAF) Sqn – in SW Pacific, attached to RAAF. Or 54 Sqn RAF.
DL	No. 91 Squadron RAF	91 Sqn
DL	No. 92 Squadron RAF	92 Sqn
DM	No. 248 Squadron RAF	248 Sqn
DN	No. 416 Squadron RCAF	416 Sqn RCAF (sometimes 416 (RCAF) Sqn)
DO	No. 199 Squadron RAF	199 Sqn
DP	No. 1416 Flight RAF	1416 Flt
DP	No. 193 Squadron RAF	193 Sqn
DP	No. 30 Squadron RAF	30 Sqn
DS	Station Flight RAF Llanbedr	
DT	No. 192 Squadron RAF	192 Sqn
DT	No. 257 Squadron RAF	257 Sqn
DU	No. 312 (Czech) Squadron RAF	312 Czech Sqn
DU	No. 70 Squadron RAF	80 Sqn
DV	No. 129 Squadron RAF	129 Sqn
DW	No. 610 Squadron RAF	610 Sqn
DX	No. 230 Squadron RAF	230 Sqn
DX	No. 245 Squadron RAF	245 Sqn
DX	No. 57 Squadron RAF	57 Sqn
DX	4 Squadron SAAF	4 Sqn SAAF
DY	No. 102 Squadron RAF	102 Sqn
DY	No. 112 Squadron RAF	112 Sqn
DY	No. 508 Squadron RAF	508 Sqn (not formed)
DZ	No. 151 Squadron RAF	151 Sqn
E	No. 15 Squadron RAF	15 Sqn
E	No. 18 Squadron RAF	18 Sqn
E	No. 19 Flying Training School RAF	19 FTS
E	No. 23 Squadron RAF	23 Sqn
E	No. 360 Squadron RAF	360 Sqn
E	No. 5 (Pilots) Advanced Flying Unit	5 (P)AFU
E	No. 6 Squadron RAF	6 Sqn
E	No. 7 Squadron RAF	8 Sqn
E	No. 72 Squadron RAF	82 Sqn
E	RAF College Flying Training School	RAF Coll FTS
E2	Station Flight RAF Warboys	
E4	Station Flight RAF Wickenby	
E7	No. 570 Squadron RAF	570 Sqn
E9	Station Flight RAF Westcott	
EA	Central Fighter Establishment	CFE
EA	No. 325 Squadron RAF	325 Sqn (not formed)
EA	No. 49 Squadron RAF	49 Sqn
EB	No. 41 Squadron RAF	41 Sqn
EC	Station Flight RAF Odiham	
ED	No. 21 Operational Training Unit RAF	21 OTU
EE	No. 16 Squadron RAF	16 Sqn
EE	No. 404 Squadron RCAF	404 Sqn RCAF (sometimes 404 (RCAF) Sqn)
EE	Station Flight RAF Elvington	
EF	No. 102 Squadron RAF	102 Sqn
EF	No. 15 Squadron RAF	15 Sqn
EF	No. 232 Squadron RAF	232 Sqn
EF	No. 36 Operational Training Unit RAF	36 OTU
EG	No. 16 Squadron RAF	16 Sqn
EG	No. 268 Squadron RAF	268 Sqn
EG	No. 34 Squadron RAF	34 Sqn
EG	No. 487 Squadron RNZAF	487 (RNZAF) Sqn (sometimes 487 Sqn RNZAF)
EH	No. 109 Squadron RAF	109 Sqn
EH	No. 3 Tactical Exercise Unit RAF	3 TEU
EH	No. 55 Operational Training Unit RAF	55 OTU
EJ	Coastal Command Flying Instructors School RAF	CCFIS
EJ	Coastal Command Instructors School RAF	CCIS
EJ	No. 127 Squadron RAF	127 Sqn
EK	No. 1656 Conversion Unit RAF	1656 CU
EK	No. 168 Squadron RAF	168 Sqn
EL	No. 10 Operational Training Unit RAF	10 OTU
EL	No. 181 Squadron RAF	181 Sqn
EL	No. 71 Squadron RAF	81 Sqn
EM	No. 207 Squadron RAF	207 Sqn
EN	No. 27 Operational Training Unit RAF	27 OTU
EO	No. 15 Operational Training Unit RAF	15 OTU
EO	No. 404 Squadron RCAF	404 Sqn RCAF (sometimes 404 (RCAF) Sqn)
EP	No. 104 Squadron RAF	104 Sqn
EP	No. 84 Group Communication Flight RAF	57 Gp Comm Flt
EQ	No. 408 Squadron RCAF	408 Sqn RCAF (sometimes 408 (RCAF) Sqn)
EQ	No. 57 Squadron RAF	57 Sqn
ER	No. 1552 Flight RAF	1552 Flt
ER	No. 621 Squadron RAF	621 Sqn
ES	No. 229 Operational Conversion Unit RAF	229 OCU
ES	No. 541 Squadron RAF	541 Sqn
ES	No. 628 Squadron RAF	628 Sqn
EU	No. 26 Operational Training Unit RAF	26 OTU
EU	No. 641 Squadron RAF	641 Sqn (not formed)
EV	No. 180 Squadron RAF	180 Sqn
EV	No. 191 Squadron RAF	191 Sqn
EW	No. 307 Polish Night Fighter Squadron	307 Polish Sqn
EW	No. 47 Squadron RAF	47 Sqn
EX	No. 11 Squadron RAF	11 Sqn
EX	No. 117 Squadron RAF	117 Sqn
EX	No. 199 Squadron RAF	199 Sqn
EX	No. 6 Squadron RAF	6 Sqn
EY	No. 233 Squadron RAF	233 Sqn
EY	No. 78 Squadron RAF	88 Sqn
EY	No. 80 Squadron RAF	80 Sqn
EZ	No. 1380 Conversion Unit RAF	1380 CU
EZ	No. 241 Squadron RAF	241 Sqn
EZ	No. 81 Operational Training Unit RAF	81 OTU

=== F- J ===
Squadron code	Unit	Unit shorthand
F	Air / Sea Warfare Development Unit RAF	A/SWDU
F	No. 111 Operational Training Unit RAF	111 OTU
F	No. 12 Squadron RAF	12 Sqn
F	No. 16 Squadron RAF	16 Sqn
F	No. 19 Flying Training School RAF	19 FTS
F	No. 240 Operational Conversion Unit RAF	240 OCU
F	No. 25 Squadron RAF	25 Sqn
F	No. 4 Flying Training School RAF	4 FTS
F	No. 6 Flying Training School RAF	6 FTS
F1	'P' Flight No. 1 Anti-Aircraft Co-operation Unit RAF	'P' Flt 1 AACU
F2	No. 635 Squadron RAF	635 Sqn
F3	No. 438 Squadron RCAF	438 Sqn RCAF (sometimes 438 (RCAF) Sqn)
FA	No. 236 Squadron RAF	236 Sqn
FA	No. 281 Squadron RAF	281 Sqn
FAA	No. 19 Flying Training School RAF	19 FTS
FAA	RAF College Flying Training School	RAF Coll FTS
FAB	No. 19 Flying Training School RAF	19 FTS
FAB	RAF College Flying Training School	RAF Coll FTS
FAC	No. 19 Flying Training School RAF	19 FTS
FAC	RAF College Flying Training School	RAF Coll FTS
FAD	No. 19 Flying Training School RAF	19 FTS
FAD	RAF College Flying Training School	RAF Coll FTS
FAE	No. 19 Flying Training School RAF	19 FTS
FAE	RAF College Flying Training School	RAF Coll FTS
FAF	No. 19 Flying Training School RAF	19 FTS
FAF	RAF College Flying Training School	RAF Coll FTS
FAG	No. 19 Flying Training School RAF	19 FTS
FAG	RAF College Flying Training School	RAF Coll FTS
FAI	No. 2 Flying Training School RAF	2 FTS
FAI	No. 20 Flying Training School RAF	20 FTS
FAI	No. 20 Service Flying Training School	20 SFTS
FAJ	No. 2 Flying Training School RAF	2 FTS
FAJ	No. 20 Flying Training School RAF	20 FTS
FAJ	No. 20 Service Flying Training School	20 SFTS
FAK	No. 2 Flying Training School RAF	2 FTS
FAK	No. 20 Flying Training School RAF	20 FTS
FAK	No. 20 Service Flying Training School	20 SFTS
FAL	No. 2 Flying Training School RAF	2 FTS
FAL	No. 20 Flying Training School RAF	20 FTS
FAL	No. 20 Service Flying Training School	20 SFTS
FAM	No. 2 Flying Training School RAF	2 FTS
FAM	No. 20 Flying Training School RAF	20 FTS
FAM	No. 20 Service Flying Training School	20 SFTS
FAN	No. 21 Flying Training School RAF	21 FTS
FAO	No. 21 Flying Training School RAF	21 FTS
FAP	No. 21 Flying Training School RAF	21 FTS
FAQ	No. 21 Flying Training School RAF	21 FTS
FAS	No. 16 (Polish) Flying Training School	16 (Pol.) FTS
FAT	No. 16 (Polish) Flying Training School	16 (Pol.) FTS
FAU	No. 16 (Polish) Flying Training School	16 (Pol.) FTS
FAV	No. 16 (Polish) Flying Training School	16 (Pol.) FTS
FAW	No. 16 (Polish) Flying Training School	16 (Pol.) FTS
FAX	No. 16 (Polish) Flying Training School	16 (Pol.) FTS
FAY	No. 16 (Polish) Flying Training School	16 (Pol.) FTS
FB	No. 24 Operational Training Unit RAF	24 OTU
FB	No. 35 Squadron RAF	35 Sqn
FB	Washington Conversion Unit RAF	WCU
FBA	No. 7 Flying Training School RAF	7 FTS
FBA	No. 7 Service Flying Training School	7 SFTS
FBB	No. 7 Flying Training School RAF	7 FTS
FBB	No. 7 Service Flying Training School	7 SFTS
FBC	No. 7 Flying Training School RAF	7 FTS
FBC	No. 7 Service Flying Training School	7 SFTS
FBD	No. 7 Flying Training School RAF	7 FTS
FBD	No. 7 Service Flying Training School	7 SFTS
FBE	No. 7 Flying Training School RAF	7 FTS
FBE	No. 7 Service Flying Training School	7 SFTS
FBG	No. 6 Flying Training School RAF	6 FTS
FBG	No. 6 Service Flying Training School	6 SFTS
FBH	No. 6 Flying Training School RAF	6 FTS
FBH	No. 6 Service Flying Training School	6 SFTS
FBI	No. 6 Flying Training School RAF	6 FTS
FBI	No. 6 Service Flying Training School	6 SFTS
FBJ	No. 6 Flying Training School RAF	6 FTS
FBJ	No. 6 Service Flying Training School	6 SFTS
FBK	No. 6 Flying Training School RAF	6 FTS
FBK	No. 6 Service Flying Training School	6 SFTS
FBL	No. 6 Flying Training School RAF	6 FTS
FBL	No. 6 Service Flying Training School	6 SFTS
FBM	No. 6 Flying Training School RAF	6 FTS
FBM	No. 6 Service Flying Training School	6 SFTS
FBN	No. 6 Flying Training School RAF	6 FTS
FBN	No. 6 Service Flying Training School	6 SFTS
FBP	No. 3 Flying Training School RAF	3 FTS
FBP	No. 3 Service Flying Training School	3 SFTS
FBQ	No. 3 Flying Training School RAF	3 FTS
FBQ	No. 3 Service Flying Training School	3 SFTS
FBR	No. 3 Flying Training School RAF	3 FTS
FBR	No. 3 Service Flying Training School	3 SFTS
FBS	No. 3 Flying Training School RAF	3 FTS
FBS	No. 3 Service Flying Training School	3 SFTS
FBT	No. 3 Flying Training School RAF	3 FTS
FBT	No. 3 Service Flying Training School	3 SFTS
FBU	No. 3 Flying Training School RAF	3 FTS
FBU	No. 3 Service Flying Training School	3 SFTS
FBV	No. 3 Flying Training School RAF	3 FTS
FBV	No. 3 Service Flying Training School	3 SFTS
FBW	No. 3 Flying Training School RAF	3 FTS
FBW	No. 3 Service Flying Training School	3 SFTS
FBX	No. 3 Flying Training School RAF	3 FTS
FBX	No. 3 Service Flying Training School	3 SFTS
FC	Station Flight RAF Kenley	
FCA	No. 1 Flying Training School RAF	1 FTS
FCA	No. 17 Flying Training School RAF	17 FTS
FCA	No. 17 Service Flying Training School	17 SFTS
FCB	No. 1 Flying Training School RAF	1 FTS
FCB	No. 17 Flying Training School RAF	17 FTS
FCB	No. 17 Service Flying Training School	17 SFTS
FCC	No. 1 Flying Training School RAF	1 FTS
FCC	No. 17 Flying Training School RAF	17 FTS
FCC	No. 17 Service Flying Training School	17 SFTS
FCD	No. 1 Flying Training School RAF	1 FTS
FCD	No. 17 Flying Training School RAF	17 FTS
FCD	No. 17 Service Flying Training School	17 SFTS
FCE	No. 1 Flying Training School RAF	1 FTS
FCE	No. 17 Flying Training School RAF	17 FTS
FCE	No. 17 Service Flying Training School	17 SFTS
FCF	No. 1 Flying Training School RAF	1 FTS
FCF	No. 17 Flying Training School RAF	17 FTS
FCF	No. 17 Service Flying Training School	17 SFTS
FCG	No. 1 Flying Training School RAF	1 FTS
FCG	No. 17 Flying Training School RAF	17 FTS
FCG	No. 17 Service Flying Training School	17 SFTS
FCI	No. 22 Flying Training School RAF	22 FTS
FCI	No. 22 Service Flying Training School	20 SFTS
FCJ	No. 22 Flying Training School RAF	22 FTS
FCJ	No. 22 Service Flying Training School	22 SFTS
FCK	No. 22 Flying Training School RAF	22 FTS
FCK	No. 22 Service Flying Training School	22 SFTS
FCL	No. 22 Flying Training School RAF	22 FTS
FCL	No. 22 Service Flying Training School	22 SFTS
FCM	No. 22 Flying Training School RAF	22 FTS
FCM	No. 22 Service Flying Training School	22 SFTS
FCT	Empire Central Flying School	ECFS
FCT	Empire Flying School	EFS
FCT	RAF Flying College	RAF Fng Coll
FCU	Empire Central Flying School	ECFS
FCU	Empire Flying School	EFS
FCU	RAF Flying College	RAF Fng Coll
FCV	Empire Central Flying School	ECFS
FCV	Empire Flying School	EFS
FCV	RAF Flying College	RAF Fng Coll
FCW	Empire Central Flying School	ECFS
FCW	Empire Flying School	EFS
FCW	RAF Flying College	RAF Fng Coll
FCX	Empire Central Flying School	ECFS
FCX	Empire Flying School	EFS
FCX	RAF Flying College	RAF Fng Coll
FD	No. 114 Squadron RAF	114 Sqn
FD	No. 1659 Conversion Unit RAF	1659 CU
FDA	No. 1 (Pilot Refresher) Flying Unit	1 (PR) FU
FDA	No. 21 (Pilot Refresher) Flying School	21 (PR) FS
FDA	No. 21 (Pilots) Advanced Flying Unit	21 (P) AFU
FDB	No. 1 Flying Training School RAF	1 (PR) FU
FDB	No. 21 (Pilot Refresher) Flying School	21 (PR) FS
FDB	No. 21 (Pilots) Advanced Flying Unit	21 (P) AFU
FDC	No. 1 (Pilot Refresher) Flying Unit RAF	1 (PR) FU
FDC	No. 21 (Pilot Refresher) Flying School RAF	21 (PR) FS
FDC	No. 21 (Pilots) Advanced Flying Unit	21 (P) AFU
FDD	No. 1 (Pilot Refresher) Flying Unit RAF	1 (PR) FU
FDD	No. 21 (Pilot Refresher) Flying School	21 (PR) FS
FDD	No. 21 (Pilots) Advanced Flying Unit	21 (P) AFU
FDE	No. 1 (Pilot Refresher) Flying Unit RAF	1 (PR) FU
FDE	No. 21 (Pilot Refresher) Flying School	21 (PR) FS
FDE	No. 21 (Pilots) Advanced Flying Unit	21 (P) AFU
FDF	No. 1 (Pilot Refresher) Flying Unit RAF	1 (PR) FU
FDF	No. 21 (Pilot Refresher) Flying School	21 (PR) FS
FDF	No. 21 (Pilots) Advanced Flying Unit	21 (P) AFU
FDG	No. 1 (Pilot Refresher) Flying Unit RAF	1 (PR) FU
FDG	No. 21 (Pilot Refresher) Flying School	21 (PR) FS
FDG	No. 21 (Pilots) Advanced Flying Unit	21 (P) AFU
FDI	Central Flying School	CFS
FDJ	Central Flying School	CFS
FDK	Central Flying School	CFS
FDL	Central Flying School	CFS
FDM	Central Flying School	CFS
FDN	Central Flying School	CFS
FDO	Central Flying School	CFS
FDQ	No. 10 Flying Instructors School RAF	10 FIS
FDQ	No. 8 Elementary Flying Training School	8 EFTS
FDR	No. 10 Flying Instructors School RAF	10 FIS
FDR	No. 8 Elementary Flying Training School	8 EFTS
FDS	No. 10 Flying Instructors School RAF	10 FIS
FDS	No. 8 Elementary Flying Training School	8 EFTS
FDT	No. 10 Flying Instructors School RAF	10 FIS
FDT	No. 8 Elementary Flying Training School	8 EFTS
FDU	Beam Approach School RAF	B App S
FDV	Beam Approach School RAF	B App S
FDW	Beam Approach School RAF	B App S
FDW	Central Flying School	CFS
FDX	Beam Approach School RAF	B App S
FDY	Airfield Controllers School RAF	ACS
FDY	School of Air Traffic Control RAF	S OF ATC
FDY	School of Flying Control RAF	S OF FC
FE	No. 56 Operational Training Unit RAF	56 OTU
FE	No. 644 Squadron RAF	644 Sqn
FEA	No. 1 Glider Training School RAF	1 GTS
FED	No. 1 Glider Training School RAF	1 GTS
FED	No. 1 Glider Training School RAF	1 GTS
FEE	No. 1 Glider Training School RAF	1 GTS
FEG	No. 3 Glider Training School RAF	3 GTS
FEH	No. 3 Glider Training School RAF	3 GTS
FEI	No. 3 Glider Training School RAF	3 GTS
FEJ	No. 3 Glider Training School RAF	3 GTS
FEK	No. 3 Glider Training School RAF	3 GTS
FEL	No. 3 Glider Training School RAF	3 GTS
FEM	No. 3 Glider Training School RAF	3 GTS
FEN	No. 3 Glider Training School RAF	3 GTS
FEP	No. 21 Heavy Glider Conversion Unit RAF	21 HGCU
FEQ	No. 21 Heavy Glider Conversion Unit RAF	21 HGCU
FER	No. 21 Heavy Glider Conversion Unit RAF	21 HGCU
FES	No. 21 Heavy Glider Conversion Unit RAF	21 HGCU
FET	No. 21 Heavy Glider Conversion Unit RAF	21 HGCU
FF	No. 132 Squadron RAF	132 Sqn
FF	No. 251 Squadron RAF	251 Sqn
FFA	No. 10 Air Gunnery School RAF	10 AGS
FFB	No. 10 Air Gunnery School RAF	10 AGS
FFC	No. 10 Air Gunnery School RAF	10 AGS
FFD	No. 10 Air Gunnery School RAF	10 AGS
FFE	No. 11 Air Gunnery School RAF	11 AGS
FFF	No. 11 Air Gunnery School RAF	11 AGS
FFG	No. 11 Air Gunnery School RAF	11 AGS
FFI	No. 1 Air Navigation School RAF	1 ANS
FFI	No. 5 Air Navigation School RAF	5 ANS
FFJ	No. 1 Air Navigation School RAF	1 ANS
FFJ	No. 5 Air Navigation School RAF	5 ANS
FFK	No. 1 Air Navigation School RAF	1 ANS
FFK	No. 5 Air Navigation School RAF	5 ANS
FFM	No. 2 Air Navigation School RAF	1 ANS
FFM	No. 7 Air Navigation School RAF	5 ANS
FFN	No. 2 Air Navigation School RAF	2 ANS
FFN	No. 7 Air Navigation School RAF	7 ANS
FFO	No. 2 Air Navigation School RAF	2 ANS
FFO	No. 7 Air Navigation School RAF	7 ANS
FFP	No. 2 Air Navigation School RAF	2 ANS
FFP	No. 7 Air Navigation School RAF	7 ANS
FFR	No. 10 Air Navigation School RAF	10 ANS
FFS	No. 10 Air Navigation School RAF	10 ANS
FFT	No. 10 Air Navigation School RAF	10 ANS
FFU	No. 10 Air Navigation School RAF	10 ANS
FG	No. 335 (Greek) Squadron RAF	335 Greek Sqn
FG	No. 72 Squadron RAF	82 Sqn
FGA	Empire Air Armament School RAF	EAAS
FGA	RAF Flying College	RAF Fng Coll
FGB	Empire Air Armament School RAF	EAAS
FGB	RAF Flying College	RAF Fng Coll
FGC	Empire Air Armament School RAF	EAAS
FGC	RAF Flying College	RAF Fng Coll
FGE	Central Navigation and Control School RAF	CN & CS
FGE	Central Navigation School RAF	CNS
FGE	Empire Air Navigation School RAF	EANS
FGF	Central Navigation and Control School RAF	CN & CS
FGF	Central Navigation School RAF	CNS
FGF	Empire Air Navigation School RAF	EANS
FGG	Central Navigation and Control School RAF	CN & CS
FGG	Central Navigation School RAF	CNS
FGG	Empire Air Navigation School RAF	EANS
FGI	Aeroplane & Armament Experimental Establishment	A&AEE
FGJ	Aeroplane & Armament Experimental Establishment	A&AEE
FGK	Aeroplane & Armament Experimental Establishment	A&AEE
FGL	Aeroplane & Armament Experimental Establishment	A&AEE
FGM	Aeroplane & Armament Experimental Establishment	A&AEE
FGN	Aeroplane & Armament Experimental Establishment	A&AEE
FGP	Empire Test Pilots' School	ETPS
FGQ	Empire Test Pilots' School	ETPS
FGR	Empire Test Pilots' School	ETPS
FGT	Airborne Forces Experimental Establishment	AFEE
FGU	Airborne Forces Experimental Establishment	AFEE
FGV	Airborne Forces Experimental Establishment	AFEE
FGW	Airborne Forces Experimental Establishment	AFEE
FGX	Airborne Forces Experimental Establishment	AFEE
FH	No. 15 Operational Training Unit RAF	15 OTU
FH	No. 258 Squadron RAF	258 Sqn
FH	No. 53 Squadron RAF	53 Sqn
FHA	No. 1 Elementary Flying Training School RAF	1 EFTS
FHB	No. 1 Elementary Flying Training School RAF	1 EFTS
FHC	No. 1 Elementary Flying Training School RAF	1 EFTS
FHE	No. 2 Elementary Flying Training School RAF	2 EFTS
FHF	No. 2 Elementary Flying Training School RAF	2 EFTS
FHG	No. 2 Elementary Flying Training School RAF	2 EFTS
FHI	No. 3 Elementary Flying Training School RAF	3 EFTS
FHJ	No. 3 Elementary Flying Training School RAF	3 EFTS
FHK	No. 3 Elementary Flying Training School RAF	3 EFTS
FHM	No. 4 Elementary Flying Training School RAF	4 EFTS
FHN	No. 4 Elementary Flying Training School RAF	4 EFTS
FHO	No. 4 Elementary Flying Training School RAF	4 EFTS
FHQ	No. 6 Elementary Flying Training School RAF	6 EFTS
FHR	No. 6 Elementary Flying Training School RAF	6 EFTS
FHS	No. 6 Elementary Flying Training School RAF	6 EFTS
FHT	No. 6 Elementary Flying Training School RAF	6 EFTS
FHV	No. 7 Elementary Flying Training School RAF	7 EFTS
FHW	No. 7 Elementary Flying Training School RAF	7 EFTS
FHX	No. 7 Elementary Flying Training School RAF	7 EFTS
FHY	No. 7 Elementary Flying Training School RAF	7 EFTS
FI	No. 1686 Flight RAF	1686 Flt
FI	No. 83 Operational Training Unit RAF	83 OTU
FI	Warwick Training Unit RAF	WTU
FIA	No. 11 Elementary Flying Training School RAF	11 EFTS
FIB	No. 11 Elementary Flying Training School RAF	11 EFTS
FIC	No. 11 Elementary Flying Training School RAF	11 EFTS
FID	No. 11 Elementary Flying Training School RAF	11 EFTS
FIJ	No. 15 Elementary Flying Training School RAF	15 EFTS
FIK	No. 15 Elementary Flying Training School RAF	15 EFTS
FIL	No. 15 Elementary Flying Training School RAF	15 EFTS
FIN	No. 16 Elementary Flying Training School RAF	16 EFTS
FIO	No. 16 Elementary Flying Training School RAF	16 EFTS
FIP	No. 16 Elementary Flying Training School RAF	16 EFTS
FIR	No. 17 Elementary Flying Training School RAF	17 EFTS
FIS	No. 17 Elementary Flying Training School RAF	17 EFTS
FIT	No. 17 Elementary Flying Training School RAF	17 EFTS
FIV	No. 21 Elementary Flying Training School RAF	21 EFTS
FIW	No. 21 Elementary Flying Training School RAF	21 EFTS
FIX	No. 21 Elementary Flying Training School RAF	21 EFTS
FIY	No. 21 Elementary Flying Training School RAF	21 EFTS
FJ	No. 164 Squadron RAF	164 Sqn
FJ	No. 261 Squadron RAF	261 Sqn
FJ	No. 37 Squadron RAF	37 Sqn
FJA	No. 22 Elementary Flying Training School RAF	22 EFTS
FJB	No. 22 Elementary Flying Training School RAF	22 EFTS
FJC	No. 22 Elementary Flying Training School RAF	22 EFTS
FJD	No. 22 Elementary Flying Training School RAF	22 EFTS
FJF	No. 24 Elementary Flying Training School RAF	24 EFTS
FJG	No. 24 Elementary Flying Training School RAF	24 EFTS
FJH	No. 24 Elementary Flying Training School RAF	24 EFTS
FJJ	No. 28 Elementary Flying Training School RAF	28 EFTS
FJK	No. 28 Elementary Flying Training School RAF	28 EFTS
FJL	No. 28 Elementary Flying Training School RAF	28 EFTS
FJN	No. 29 Elementary Flying Training School RAF	29 EFTS
FJO	No. 29 Elementary Flying Training School RAF	29 EFTS
FJP	No. 29 Elementary Flying Training School RAF	29 EFTS
FJQ	No. 29 Elementary Flying Training School RAF	29 EFTS
FJR	Central Gunnery School RAF	CGS
FJS	Central Gunnery School RAF	CGS
FJT	Central Gunnery School RAF	CGS
FJU	Central Gunnery School RAF	CGS
FJV	Central Gunnery School RAF	CGS
FJW	Central Gunnery School RAF	CGS
FJX	Central Gunnery School RAF	CGS
FK	No. 134 Squadron RAF	134 Sqn
FK	No. 209 Squadron RAF	209 Sqn
FK	No. 219 Squadron RAF	219 Sqn
FKA	No. 1511 Beam Approach Training Flight RAF	1511 B App.TFlt
FKB	No. 1511 Beam Approach Training Flight RAF	1511 B App.TFlt
FKD	No. 1537 Beam Approach Training Flight RAF	1537 B App.TFlt
FKF	No. 1547 Beam Approach Training Flight RAF	1547 B App.TFlt
FKN	Flying Training Command Communication Flight RAF	FTCC Flt
FKO	No. 21 Group Communication Flight RAF	21 Gp Comm Flt
FKP	No. 23 Group Communication Flight RAF	23 Gp Comm Flt
FKQ	No. 25 Group Communication Flight RAF	25 Gp Comm Flt
FKR	No. 54 Group Communication Flight RAF	54 Gp Comm Flt
FKS	Station Flight RAF Cranwell	
FL	No. 155 Squadron RAF	155 Sqn
FL	No. 81 Squadron RAF	81 Sqn
FLA	Cambridge University Air Squadron	Camb UAS
FLB	Aberdeen University Air Squadron	Ab UAS
FLC	Edinburgh University Air Squadron	Edin UAS
FLD	Glasgow University Air Squadron	Glas UAS
FLE	Queens University Air Squadron	Queens UAS
FLF	St. Andrews University Air Squadron	St. And UAS
FLG	Liverpool University Air Squadron	Liv UAS
FLH	Manchester University Air Squadron	Man UAS
FLI	Leeds University Air Squadron	Leeds UAS
FLJ	Durham University Air Squadron	Dur UAS
FLK	Birmingham University Air Squadron	Birm UAS
FLL	Nottingham University Air Squadron	Nott UAS
FLM	Bristol University Air Squadron	Brist UAS
FLN	Swansea University Air Squadron	Swan UAS
FLO	London University Air Squadron	Lon UAS
FLO	University of London Air Squadron	ULUAS
FLP	Southampton University Air Squadron	Soton UAS
FLQ	Oxford University Air Squadron	Ox UAS
FLR	Perth University Air Squadron	Perth UAS
FLS	Wolverhampton University Air Squadron	Wolv UAS
FLT	Derby University Air Squadron	Der UAS
FLU	Yatesbury University Air Squadron	Yates UAS
FLV	Cambridge University Air Squadron	Camb UAS
FM	No. 238 Squadron RAF	238 Sqn
FM	No. 257 Squadron RAF	257 Sqn
FM	No. 518 Squadron RAF	518 Sqn
FMA	No. 201 Advanced Flying School RAF	201 AFS
FMB	No. 201 Advanced Flying School RAF	201 AFS
FMC	No. 201 Advanced Flying School RAF	201 AFS
FME	No. 202 Advanced Flying School RAF	202 AFS
FMF	No. 202 Advanced Flying School RAF	202 AFS
FMG	No. 202 Advanced Flying School RAF	202 AFS
FMI	No. 203 Advanced Flying School RAF	203 AFS
FMJ	No. 203 Advanced Flying School RAF	203 AFS
FMK	No. 203 Advanced Flying School RAF	203 AFS
FMO	No. 204 Advanced Flying School RAF	204 AFS
FN	No. 125 Squadron RAF	125 Sqn
FN	No. 331 (Norway) Squadron RAF	331 Norwegian Sqn
FN	No. 453 Squadron RAAF (June–August 1942)	453 Sqn RAAF (sometimes 453 RAAF Sqn) in Malaya/Singapore
FO	No. 1665 Conversion Unit RAF	1665 CU
FO	No. 75 Squadron RAF	85 Sqn
FO	Station Flight RAF Wick	
FP	No. 1683 Flight RAF	1683 Flt
FQ	No. 12 Operational Training Unit RAF	12 OTU
FR	No. 348 Squadron RAF	348 Sqn (not formed)
FR	Station Flight RAF Manston	
FS	No. 148 Squadron RAF	148 Sqn
FS	No. 506 Squadron RAF	506 Sqn (not formed)
FT	No. 290 Squadron RAF	290 Sqn
FT	No. 43 Squadron RAF	43 Sqn
FT	Station Flight RAF Mildenhall	
FU	No. 453 Squadron RAAF (1942–46)	453 Sqn RAAF (sometimes 453 RAAF Sqn); in Europe
FU	No. 458 Squadron RAAF (Sep 1941 – Mar 1942)	458 Sqn RAAF (sometimes 458 RAAF Sqn)
FV	No. 13 Operational Training Unit RAF	13 OTU
FV	No. 205 Squadron RAF	205 Sqn
FV	No. 230 Squadron RAF	230 Sqn
FW	No. 194 Squadron RAF	194 Sqn
FW	Station Flight RAF Rivenhall	
FX	No. 234 Squadron RAF	234 Sqn
FX	No. 266 Squadron RAF	266 Sqn
FX	No. 34 Operational Training Unit RAF	34 OTU
FX	No. 6 Squadron RAAF	6 Sqn RAAF*
FY	No. 34 Operational Training Unit RAF	34 OTU
FY	No. 4 Squadron RAF	4 Sqn
FY	No. 611 Squadron RAF	611 Sqn
FZ	No. 23 Operational Training Unit RAF	23 OTU
FZ	No. 65 Squadron RAF	65 Sqn
FZ	No. 94 Squadron RAF	94 Sqn
G	Joint Anti-Submarine School Flight RAF	JASS Flt
G	No. 19 Flying Training School RAF	19 FTS
G	No. 2 Flying Training School RAF	2 FTS
G	No. 20 Squadron RAF	20 Sqn
G	No. 4 Flying Training School RAF	4 FTS
G	No. 43 Squadron RAF	43 Sqn
G	No. 5 Flying Training School RAF	5 FTS
G	No. 54 Squadron RAF	54 Sqn
G	No. 6 Flying Training School RAF	6 FTS
G	No. 81 Squadron RAF	81 Sqn
G2	No. 19 Group Communication Flight RAF	19 Gp Comm Flt
G4	Station Flight RAF Skellingthorpe	
G7	Bomber Command Film Unit	BCFU
G8	Station Flight RAF Wing	
G9	No. 430 Squadron RCAF	430 Sqn RCAF (sometimes 430 (RCAF) Sqn)
GA	No. 112 Squadron RAF	112 Sqn
GA	No. 16 Operational Training Unit RAF	16 OTU
GA	No. 208 Squadron RAF	208 Sqn
GA	No. 21 Squadron RAAF (1941–42)	21 Sqn RAAF (sometimes 21 RAAF Sqn); Malaya/Singapore.
GB	No. 100 Squadron RAF	100 Sqn
GB	No. 105 Squadron RAF	105 Sqn
GB	No. 166 Squadron RAF	166 Sqn
GB	No. 83 Squadron RAF	83 Sqn
GB	No. 97 Squadron RAF	97 Sqn
GC	Station Flight RAF Pershore	
GD	Station Flight RAF Horsham St Faith	
GE	No. 349 (Belgium) Squadron RAF	349 (Belgian Sqn)
GE	No. 58 Squadron RAF	58 Sqn
GF	No. 1 Tactical Exercise Unit RAF	1 TEU
GF	No. 56 Operational Training Unit RAF	56 OTU
GG	No. 151 Squadron RAF	151 Sqn
GG	No. 1667 Conversion Unit RAF	1667 CU
GH	No. 285 Squadron RAF	285 Sqn
GI	No. 622 Squadron RAF	622 Sqn
GK	No. 459 Squadron RAAF	459 Sqn RAAF (sometimes 459 RAAF Sqn)
GK	No. 52 Operational Training Unit RAF	52 OTU
GK	No. 80 Squadron RAF	80 Sqn
GL	No. 14 Operational Training Unit RAF	14 OTU
GL	No. 1529 Flight RAF	1529 Flt
GL	5 Squadron SAAF	5 Sqn SAAF
GL	No. 175 Squadron RAF	175 Sqn
GL	No. 185 Squadron RAF	185 Sqn
GL	Station Flight RAF Duxford	
GM	No. 55 Squadron RAF	55 Sqn
GM	No. 74 Squadron RAF	84 Sqn
GN	Central Bomber Establishment RAF	CBE
GN	No. 249 Squadron RAF	249 Sqn
GN	No. 323 Squadron RAF	323 Sqn (not formed)
GO	Central Fighter Establishment RAF	CFE
GO	No. 135 Squadron RAF	135 Sqn
GO	No. 94 Squadron RAF	94 Sqn
GP	No. 1661 Conversion Unit RAF	1661 CU
GP	No. 187 Squadron RAF	187 Sqn
GQ	No. 134 Squadron RAF	134 Sqn
GQ	Station Flight RAF North Killingholme	
GR	No. 1586 Flight RAF	1586 Flt
GR	No. 301 Polish Bomber Squadron	301 Polish Sqn
GR	No. 92 Squadron RAF	92 Sqn
GS	No. 190 Squadron RAF	190 Sqn
GS	No. 297 Squadron RAF	297 Sqn
GS	No. 330 (Norway) Squadron RAF	330 Norwegian Sqn
GS	No. 83 Operational Training Unit RAF	83 OTU
GT	No. 156 Squadron RAF	156 Sqn
GT	No. 344 (French) Squadron RAF	344 French Sqn
GU	No. 18 Squadron RAF	18 Sqn
GV	No. 103 Squadron RAF	103 Sqn
GV	No. 1652 Conversion Unit RAF	1652 CU
GW	No. 252 Squadron RAF	252 Sqn
GW	No. 340 (French) Squadron RAF	340 French Sqn
GX	No. 415 Squadron RCAF	415 Sqn RCAF (sometimes 415 (RCAF) Sqn)
GX	No. 507 Squadron RAF	507 Sqn (not formed)
GX	Station Flight RAF Broadwell	
GY	No. 109 (Transport) Operational Training Unit RAF	109 (T)OTU
GY	No. 1383 Conversion Unit RAF	1383 CU
GZ	No. 12 Squadron RAF	12 Sqn
GZ	No. 32 Squadron RAF	32 Sqn
GZ	No. 611 Squadron RAF	611 Sqn
H	No. 111 Squadron RAF	111 Sqn
H	No. 1340 Flight RAF	1340 Flt
H	No. 19 Flying Training School RAF	19 FTS
H	No. 4 Flying Training School RAF	4 FTS
H	No. 5 (Pilots) Advanced Flying Unit	5 (P)AFU
H	School of Maritime Reconnaissance RAF	S OF MR
H7	No. 346 (French) Squadron RAF	346 French Sqn
H8	No. 42 (Belgian) Squadron RAF	42 (Belgian) Sqn
H9	Station Flight RAF Shepherds Grove	
HA	No. 218 Squadron RAF	218 Sqn
HA	No. 649 Squadron RAF	649 Sqn (not formed)
HB	No. 229 Squadron RAF	229 Sqn
HB	No. 239 Squadron RAF	239 Sqn
HC	No. 512 Squadron RAF	512 Sqn
HD	No. 311 (Czech) Squadron RAF	311 Czech Sqn
HD	No. 38 Squadron RAF	38 Sqn
HD	No. 466 Squadron RAAF	466 Sqn RAAF (sometimes 466 RAAF Sqn)
HE	No. 263 Squadron RAF	263 Sqn
HE	No. 605 Squadron RAF	605 Sqn
HF	No. 127 Squadron RAF	127 Sqn
HF	No. 183 Squadron RAF	183 Sqn
HF	No. 54 Squadron RAF	54 Sqn
HG	No. 154 Squadron RAF	154 Sqn
HG	No. 332 (Norway) Squadron RAF	332 Sqn
HH	No. 175 Squadron RAF	175 Sqn
HH	No. 273 Squadron RAF	273 Sqn
HI	No. 63 Operational Training Unit RAF	63 OTU
HI	No. 66 Squadron RAF	66 Sqn
HJ	No. 254 Squadron RAF	254 Sqn
HK	Fighter Leaders School RAF	FLS
HK	No. 269 Squadron RAF	269 Sqn
HK	No. 306 (Polish) Squadron RAF	306 Polish Sqn
HL	No. 26 Squadron RAF	26 Sqn
HL	Station Flight RAF Gransden Lodge	
HM	No. 136 Squadron RAF	136 Sqn
HM	No. 1667 Flight RAF	1667 Flt
HN	No. 20 Squadron RAF	20 Sqn
HN	No. 93 Squadron RAF	93 Sqn
HP	Gunnery Research Unit RAF	GRU
HP	No. 247 Squadron RAF	247 Sqn
HP	Station Flight RAF Full Sutton	
HQ	No. 56 Operational Training Unit RAF	56 OTU
HQ	No. 91 Squadron RAF	91 Sqn
HR	North-East Sector Communication Flight RAF	N-ES Comm Flt
HS	No. 109 Squadron RAF	109 Sqn
HS	No. 170 Squadron RAF	170 Sqn
HS	No. 260 Squadron RAF	260 Sqn
HT	No. 154 Squadron RAF	154 Sqn
HT	No. 158 Squadron RAF	158 Sqn
HT	No. 601 Squadron RAF	601 Sqn
HU	No. 220 Squadron RAF	220 Sqn
HU	No. 406 Squadron RCAF	406 Sqn RCAF (sometimes 406 (RCAF) Sqn)
HV	No. 73 Squadron RAF	83 Sqn
HV	No. 8 Squadron RAF	8 Sqn
HV	Station Flight RAF East Kirkby	
HW	No. 100 Squadron RAF	100 Sqn
HX	No. 203 Advanced Flying School RAF	203 AFS
HX	No. 226 Operational Conversion Unit RAF	226 OCU
HX	No. 295 Squadron RAF	295 Sqn
HX	No. 61 Operational Training Unit RAF	61 OTU
HY	No. 88 Squadron RAF	88 Sqn
HZ	No. 44 Group Communication Flight RAF	44 Gp Comm Flt
I	Central Flying School	CFS
I2	No. 48 Squadron RAF	48 Sqn
I4	No. 567 Squadron RAF	567 Sqn
I5	No. 105 Operational Training Unit RAF	105 OTU
I5	No. 1381 Conversion Unit RAF	1381 CU
I6	No. 32 Maintenance Unit RAF	32 MU
I8	No. 440 Squadron RCAF	440 Sqn RCAF (sometimes 440 (RCAF) Sqn)
I9	No. 575 Squadron RAF	575 Sqn
IA	Station Flight RAF Syerston	
IB	Glider pick-up Training Flight RAF	GPUT Flt
IB	No. 43 Group Communication Flight RAF	43 Gp Comm Flt
IC	No. 623 Squadron RAF	623 Sqn
IF	No. 84 Operational Training Unit RAF	48 OTU
II	No. 116 Squadron RAF	116 Sqn
II	No. 59 Operational Training Unit RAF	59 OTU
IK	Bomber Command Instructors School RAF	BCIS
IL	No. 115 Squadron RAF	115 Sqn
IN	Station Flight RAF Valley	
IP	Bomber Command Instructors School RAF	BCIS
IQ	No. 150 Squadron RAF	150 Sqn
IV	Station Flight RAF Upper Heyford	
IW	Station Flight RAF Chilbolton	
IY	Station Flight RAF Dunsfold	
J	No. 111 Operational Training Unit RAF	111 OTU
J	No. 26 Squadron RAF	26 Sqn
J	No. 27 Squadron RAF	27 Sqn
J	RAF College Flying Training School	RAF Coll FTS
J5	No. 3 Squadron RAF	3 Sqn
J6	No. 1521 Flight RAF	1521 Flt
J7	No. 8 Maintenance Unit RAF	8 MU
J8	No. 24 Maintenance Unit RAF	24 MU
J9	No. 1668 Conversion Unit RAF	1668 CU
JA	No. 1652 Conversion Unit RAF	1652 CU
JB	No. 1380 Conversion Unit RAF	1380 CU
JB	No. 190 Squadron RAF	190 Sqn
JB	No. 81 Operational Training Unit RAF	81 OTU
JC	No. 11 Group Communication Flight RAF	11 Gp Comm Flt
JD	Station Flight RAF Grimsetter	
JE	No. 195 Squadron RAF	195 Sqn
JE	No. 610 Squadron RAF	610 Sqn
JF	No. 1654 Conversion Unit RAF	1654 CU
JF	No. 3 Squadron RAF	3 Sqn
JG	No. 17 Operational Training Unit RAF	17 OTU
JH	No. 317 (Polish) Squadron RAF	317 Polish Sqn
JH	No. 74 Squadron RAF	84 Sqn
JI	No. 514 Squadron RAF	514 Sqn
JJ	No. 160 Squadron RAF	160 Sqn
JJ	No. 274 Squadron RAF	274 Sqn
JL	No. 10 Operational Training Unit RAF	10 OTU
JL	No. 520 Squadron RAF	520 Sqn
JM	No. 184 Squadron RAF	184 Sqn
JM	No. 20 Operational Training Unit RAF	20 OTU
JM	No. 32 Squadron RAAF	32 Sqn RAAF*
JN	No. 150 Squadron RAF	150 Sqn
JN	No. 268 Squadron RAF	268 Sqn
JN	No. 30 Squadron RAF	30 Sqn
JN	No. 75 Squadron RAF	85 Sqn
JO	No. 463 Squadron RAAF	463 Sqn RAAF (sometimes 463 RAAF Sqn)
JO	No. 62 Squadron RAF	62 Sqn
JP	No. 12 Operational Training Unit RAF	12 OTU
JP	No. 21 Squadron RAF	21 Sqn
JQ	No. 169 Squadron RAF	169 Sqn
JQ	No. 2 Anti-aircraft Co-operation Unit RAF	2 AACU
JQ	Station Flight RAF Breighton	
JR	No. 161 Squadron RAF	161 Sqn
JS	No. 16 Operational Training Unit RAF	16 OTU
JS	No. 321 (Netherlands) Squadron RAF	321 Dutch Sqn
JT	No. 182 Squadron RAF	182 Sqn
JT	No. 256 Squadron RAF	256 Sqn
JU	No. 111 Squadron RAF	111 Sqn
JU	No. 202 Squadron RAF	202 Sqn
JV	No. 283 Squadron RAF	283 Sqn
JV	No. 6 Squadron RAF	6 Sqn
JV	Station Flight RAF Finningley	
JW	Central Fighter Establishment	CFE
JW	No. 44 Squadron RAF	44 Sqn
JX	No. 1 Squadron RAF	1 Sqn
JY	No. 121 Squadron RAF	121 Sqn
JZ	No. 57 Operational Training Unit RAF	57 OTU

=== K-O ===
Squadron code	Unit	Unit shorthand
K	Central Flying School	CFS
K	No. 1 Flying Training School RAF	1 FTS
K1	'K' Flight No. 1 Anti-Aircraft Co-operation Unit RAF	'K' Flt 1 AACU
K2	No. 2 Group Communication Flight RAF	2 Gp Comm Flt
K5	Station Flight RAF Pocklington	
K7	No. 236 Operational Conversion Unit RAF	236 OCU
K7	No. 6 Operational Training Unit RAF	6 OTU
K8	Station Flight RAF Wymeswold	
K9	Station Flight RAF Tain	
KA	No. 1685 Flight RAF	1685 Flt
KA	No. 9 Squadron RAF	9 Sqn
KB	No. 142 Squadron RAF	142 Sqn
KB	No. 1661 Conversion Unit RAF	1661 CU
KC	No. 238 Squadron RAF	238 Sqn
KC	No. 617 Squadron RAF	617 Sqn
KD	No. 154 Squadron RAF	154 Sqn
KD	No. 226 Operational Conversion Unit RAF	226 OCU
KD	No. 30 Operational Training Unit RAF	30 OTU
KE	Merchant Ship Flying Unit RAF	MSFU
KE	No. 330 (Norway) Squadron RAF	330 Norwegian Sqn
KF	No. 1662 Conversion Unit RAF	1662 CU
KF	No. 645 Squadron RAF	645 Sqn (not formed)
KG	No. 1380 Conversion Unit RAF	1380 CU
KG	No. 196 Squadron RAF	196 Sqn
KG	No. 204 Squadron RAF	204 Sqn
KG	No. 81 Operational Training Unit RAF	81 OTU
KH	No. 11 Operational Training Unit RAF	11 OTU
KH	No. 403 Squadron RCAF	403 Sqn RCAF (sometimes 403 (RCAF) Sqn)
KI	Station Flight RAF Coningsby	
KJ	No. 11 Operational Training Unit RAF	11 OTU
KJ	No. 16 Squadron RAF	16 Sqn
KJ	4 Squadron SAAF	4 Sqn SAAF
KK	No. 15 Operational Training Unit RAF	15 OTU
KK	No. 333 (Norway) Squadron RAF	333 Norwegian Sqn
KK	No. 624 Squadron RAF "Polish Flight" (Balkan Air Force)	624 Sqn Polish Flight
KL	No. 269 Squadron RAF	269 Sqn
KL	No. 54 Squadron RAF	54 Sqn
KM	No. 205 Squadron RAF	205 Sqn
KM	No. 44 Squadron RAF	44 Sqn
KN	No. 339 Squadron RAF	339 Sqn (not formed)
KN	No. 77 Squadron RAF	77 Sqn
KO	No. 115 Squadron RAF	115 Sqn
KO	No. 2 Squadron RAAF	2 Sqn RAAF*
KP	No. 226 Squadron RAF	226 Sqn
KP	No. 409 Squadron RCAF	409 Sqn RCAF (sometimes 409 (RCAF) Sqn)
KQ	No. 13 Operational Training Unit RAF	13 OTU
KQ	No. 502 Squadron RAF	502 Sqn
KR	No. 1667 Conversion Unit RAF	1667 CU
KR	No. 226 Operational Conversion Unit RAF	226 OCU
KR	No. 231 Squadron RAF	231 Sqn
KR	No. 61 Operational Training Unit RAF	61 OTU
KS	Station Flight RAF Tarrant Rushton	
KT	No. 32 Squadron RAF	32 Sqn
KT	No. 54 Squadron RAF	54 Sqn
KT	No. 7 Squadron RAAF	7 Sqn RAAF*
KU	No. 265 Squadron RAF	265 Sqn
KU	No. 47 Squadron RAF	47 Sqn
KU	No. 53 Operational Training Unit RAF	53 OTU
KV	No. 264 Squadron RAF	264 Sqn
KV	No. 619 Squadron RAF	619 Sqn
KW	No. 267 Squadron RAF "Riposte Opns."	267 Sqn
KW	No. 312 (Czech) Squadron RAF	312 Czech Sqn
KW	No. 425 Squadron RCAF	425 Sqn RCAF (sometimes 425 (RCAF) Sqn)
KW	No. 615 Squadron RAF	615 Sqn
KX	No. 1448 Flight RAF	1448 Flt
KX	No. 311 (Czech) Squadron RAF	311 Czech Sqn
KX	No. 529 Squadron RAF	529 Sqn
KX	No. 639 Squadron RAF	639 Sqn
KY	No. 162 Squadron RAF	162 Sqn
KY	No. 242 Squadron RAF	242 Sqn
KZ	No. 287 Squadron RAF	287 Sqn
KZ	No. 296 Squadron RAF	296 Sqn
L-Z	No. 421 Flight RAF	421 Flt
L4	No. 27 Maintenance Unit RAF	27 MU
L5	No. 297 Squadron RAF	297 Sqn
L6	No. 1669 Conversion Unit RAF	1669 CU
L7	No. 271 Squadron RAF	271 Sqn
L8	No. 347 (French) Squadron RAF	347 French Sqn
L9	No. 190 Squadron RAF	190 Sqn
LA	No. 235 Squadron RAF	235 Sqn
LA	No. 607 Squadron RAF	607 Sqn
LB	No. 28 Operational Training Unit RAF	28 OTU
LB	No. 34 Squadron RAF	34 Sqn
LC	Station Flight RAF Feltwell	
LD	No. 108 Squadron RAF	108 Sqn
LD	No. 117 Squadron RAF	117 Sqn
LD	No. 250 Squadron RAF	250 Sqn
LD	No. 331 (Norway) Squadron RAF	331 Norwegian Sqn
LE	No. 242 Squadron RAF	242 Sqn
LE	No. 40 Squadron RAF	40 Sqn
LE	No. 630 Squadron RAF	630 Sqn
LF	No. 172 Squadron RAF	172 Sqn
LF	No. 37 Squadron RAF	37 Sqn
LF	Station Flight RAF Predannack	
LG	No. 13 Group Communication Flight RAF	13 Gp Comm Flt
LG	No. 215 Squadron RAF	215 Sqn
LG	No. 89 Squadron RAF	89 Sqn
LH	No. 313 (Czech) Squadron RAF	313 Czech Sqn
LH	Station Flight RAF Mepal	
LJ	No. 211 Squadron RAF	211 Sqn
LJ	No. 600 Squadron RAF	600 Sqn
LJ	No. 614 Squadron RAF	614 Sqn
LJ	No. 614A Squadron RAF	614A Sqn
LK	No. 342 (French) Squadron RAF	342 French Sqn
LK	No. 51 Squadron RAF	51 Sqn
LK	No. 578 Squadron RAF	578 Sqn
LK	No. 87 Squadron RAF	87 Sqn
LL	No. 1513 Flight RAF	1513 Flt
LM	No. 189 Squadron RAF	189 Sqn
LM	Station Flight RAF Elsham Wolds	
LN	No. 183 Squadron RAF	183 Sqn
LN	No. 83 Group Communication Flight RAF	83 Gp Comm Flt RAF
LN	No. 99 Squadron RAF	99 Sqn
LO	No. 602 Squadron RAF	602 Sqn
LO	No. 62? Squadron RAF	62? Sqn
LO	No. 632 Squadron RAF	632 Sqn (not formed)
LP	No. 237 Operational Conversion Unit RAF	237 OCU
LP	No. 327 (French) Squadron RAF	327 French Sqn
LQ	No. 405 Squadron RCAF	405 Sqn RCAF (sometimes 405 (RCAF) Sqn)
LQ	No. 629 Squadron RAF	629 Sqn (not formed)
LR	No. 1667 Conversion Unit RAF	1667 CU
LR	No. 31 Operational Training Unit RAF	31 OTU
LR	No. 56 Squadron RAF	56 Sqn
LS	No. 15 Squadron RAF	15 Sqn
LS	No. 61 Squadron RAF	61 Sqn
LT	No. 22 Operational Training Unit RAF	22 OTU
LT	No. 7 Squadron RAF	7 Sqn
LU	Merchant Flying Unit RAF	MFU
LU	No. 101 Squadron RAF	101 Sqn
LV	No. 57 Operational Training Unit RAF	57 OTU
LW	No. 318 (Polish) Squadron RAF	318 Polish Sqn
LW	No. 607 Squadron RAF	607 Sqn
LW	No. 74 Wing Calibration Flight RAF	74Wg. Cal. Flt
LW	No. 75 Wing Calibration Flight RAF	75Wg. Cal. Flt
LW	No. 76 Wing Calibration Flight RAF	76Wg. Cal. Flt
LX	No. 225 Squadron RAF	225 Sqn
LX	No. 54 Operational Training Unit RAF	54 OTU
LX	No. 614A Squadron RAF	614A Sqn
LY	No. 1 Photographic Reconnaissance Unit RAF	1 PRU
LY	No. 149 Squadron RAF	149 Sqn
LY	No. 30 Squadron RAAF	30 Sqn RAAF*
LY	Photographic Reconnaissance Unit	PRU
LZ	No. 66 Squadron RAF	66 Sqn
LZ	No. 111 Squadron RCAF	111 Sqn RCAF*
M	Central Flying School	CFS
M	No. 1 Flying Training School RAF	1 FTS
M	No. 10 Advanced Flying Training School RAF	10 AFTS
M	No. 102 Flying Refresher School RAF	102 FRS
M	No. 111 Operational Training Unit RAF	111 OTU
M	No. 202 Advanced Flying School RAF	202 AFS
M	No. 205 Advanced Flying School RAF	205 AFS
M	No. 206 Advanced Flying School RAF	206 AFS
M	No. 215 Advanced Flying School RAF	215 AFS
M	No. 22 Flying Training School RAF	22 FTS
M	No. 22 Service Flying Training School RAF	22 SFTS
M	No. 3 Flying Training School RAF	3 FTS
M	No. 6 Flying Training School RAF	6 FTS
M	No. 7 Flying Training School RAF	7 FTS
M	No. 9 Advanced Flying Training School RAF	9 AFTS
M	No. 9 Flying Training School RAF	9 FTS
M1	'M' Flight No. 1 Anti-Aircraft Co-operation Unit RAF	'M' Flt 1 AACU
M2	No. 33 Maintenance Unit RAF	33 MU
M4	No. 587 Squadron RAF	587 Sqn
M5	No. 128 Squadron RAF	128 Sqn
M6	No. 83 Group Communication Flight RAF	83 Gp Comm Flt
M7	No. 41 Group Communication Flight RAF	41 Gp Comm Flt
M8	No. 4 Group Communication Flight RAF	4 Gp Comm Flt
M9	No. 1653 Conversion Unit RAF	1653 CU
MA	No. 161 Squadron RAF	161 Sqn
MA	No. 650 Squadron RAF	650 Sqn
MA	No. 651 Squadron (Polish AOP Flight) RAF	651 Sqn Polish AOP
MB	No. 220 Squadron RAF	220 Sqn
MB	No. 236 Squadron RAF	236 Sqn
MB	No. 52 Squadron RAF	52 Sqn
MB	No. 651 Squadron (Polish AOP Flight) RAF	651 Sqn Polish AOP
MC	No. 651 Squadron (Polish AOP Flight) RAF	651 Sqn Polish AOP
MC	Station Flight RAF Fiskerton	
MD	No. 133 (Eagle) Squadron RAF	133 Eagle Sqn
MD	No. 458 Squadron RAAF	458 Sqn RAAF (sometimes 458 RAAF Sqn)
MD	No. 526 Squadron RAF	526 Sqn
MD	No. 651 Squadron (Polish AOP Flight) RAF	651 Sqn Polish AOP
ME	No. 488 Squadron RNZAF	488 (RNZAF) Sqn)(sometimes 488 Sqn RNZAF
MF	Central Fighter Establishment RAF	CFE
MF	Fighter Leaders School RAF	FLS
MF	No. 108 Squadron RAF	108 Sqn
MF	No. 280 Squadron RAF	280 Sqn
MF	No. 59 Operational Training Unit RAF	59 OTU
MG	No. 7 Squadron RAF	7 Sqn
MH	No. 237 Squadron RAF	237 Sqn
MH	No. 51 Squadron RAF	51 Sqn
MJ	No. 1680 Flight RAF	8016 Flt
MJ	No. 69 Squadron RAF	69 Sqn
MJ	No. 21 Squadron RAAF (1943–45)	21 Sqn RAAF (SW Pacific)
MK	No. 126 Squadron RAF	126 Sqn
MK	No. 20 Operational Training Unit RAF	20 OTU
MK	No. 500 Squadron RAF	500 Sqn
ML	No. 12 Operational Training Unit RAF	12 OTU
ML	No. 257 Squadron RAF	257 Sqn
ML	No. 338 Squadron RAF	338 Sqn (not formed)
MM	No. 291 Squadron RAF	291 Sqn
MN	No. 328 (French) Squadron RAF	328 French Sqn
MN	No. 350 (Belgian) Squadron RAF	350 Belgian Sqn
MOTU	Maritime Operational Training Unit RAF	MOTU
MP	No. 246 Squadron RAF	246 Sqn
MP	No. 76 Squadron RAF	86 Sqn
MQ	No. 226 Squadron RAF	226 Sqn
MQ	No. 642 Squadron RAF	642 Sqn (not formed)
MR	No. 186 Squadron RAF	186 Sqn
MR	No. 245 Squadron RAF	245 Sqn
MR	No. 97 Squadron RAF	97 Sqn
MS	Hornet Conversion Flight RAF	HC Flt
MS	No. 23 Squadron RAF	23 Sqn
MS	No. 273 Squadron RAF	273 Sqn
MS	Station Flight RAF Linton-on-Ouse	
MT	No. 105 Squadron RAF	105 Sqn
MT	No. 122 Squadron RAF	122 Sqn
MU	No. 274 Squadron RAF	274 Sqn
MU	No. 60 Squadron RAF	60 Sqn
MV	No. 53 Operational Training Unit RAF	53 OTU
MV	No. 600 Squadron RAF	600 Sqn
MW	No. 101 Squadron RAF	101 Sqn
MW	No. 1641 Flight RAF	1641 Flt
MW	No. 217 Squadron RAF	217 Sqn
MW	No. 301 Polish Bomber Squadron	301 Polish Sqn
MW	No. 5 Coastal Patrol Flight RAF	5 CPF
MX	No. 120 Squadron RAF	120 Sqn
MX	No. 1653 Conversion Unit RAF	1653 CU
MX	Station Flight RAF Glatton	
MY	No. 27 Squadron RAF	27 Sqn
MY	No. 278 Squadron RAF	278 Sqn
MZ	No. 617 Squadron RAF	617 Sqn
MZ	No. 83 Operational Training Unit RAF	83 OTU
N	Central Flying School	CFS
N	Flying Refresher School RAF	FRS
N	No. 1 Flying Training School RAF	1 FTS
N	No. 101 Flying Refresher School RAF	101 FRS
N	No. 111 Operational Training Unit RAF	111 OTU
N	No. 14 (Advanced) Flying Training School RAF	14 (A)FTS
N	No. 2 Basic Air Navigation School RAF	2 BANS
N	No. 2 Flying Training School RAF	2 FTS
N	No. 202 Advanced Flying School RAF	202 AFS
N	No. 215 Advanced Flying School RAF	215 AFS
N	No. 22 Flying Training School RAF	22 FTS
N	No. 22 Service Flying Training School RAF	22 SFTS
N	No. 3 Flying Training School RAF	3 FTS
N	No. 6 Flying Training School RAF	6 FTS
N	No. 7 Flying Training School RAF	7 FTS
N	RAF College Flying Training School	RAF Coll FTS
N7	Station Flight RAF Lyneham	
N8	Station Flight RAF Waterbeach	
N9	Station Flight RAF Blackbushe	
N9	Station Flight RAF Bückeburg	
NA	No. 1 Squadron RAAF (1943–45)	1 Sqn RAAF; SW Pacific
NA	No. 428 Squadron RCAF	428 Sqn RCAF (sometimes 428 (RCAF) Sqn)
NA	Station Flight RAF Manorbier	
NB	Fighter Command Communication Flight Training School RAF	FCCFTS
NB	Fighter Command Communication Squadron Training School RAF	FCCSTS
NB	No. 635 Squadron RAF	635 Sqn
NC	No. 4 Squadron RAF	4 Sqn
ND	No. 1666 Conversion Unit RAF	1666 CU
ND	No. 236 Squadron RAF	236 Sqn
ND	11 Squadron SAAF	11 Sqn SAAF
ND	No. 343 (French) Squadron RAF	343 Sqn
NE	No. 143 Squadron RAF	143 Sqn
NE	No. 63 Squadron RAF	63 Sqn
NF	No. 138 Squadron RAF	138 Sqn
NF	No. 488 Squadron RAF	488 Sqn
NG	No. 604 Squadron RAF	604 Sqn
NH	No. 119 Squadron RAF	119 Sqn
NH	No. 274 Squadron RAF	274 Sqn
NH	No. 38 Squadron RAF	38 Sqn
NH	No. 415 Squadron RCAF	415 Sqn RCAF (sometimes 415 (RCAF) Sqn)
NI	No. 451 Squadron RAAF	451 Sqn RAAF (sometimes 451 RAAF Sqn)
NH	No. 530 Squadron RAF	530 Sqn
NJ	Merchant Ship Flying Unit RAF	MSFU
NJ	No. 207 Squadron RAF	207 Sqn
NK	No. 118 Squadron RAF	118 Sqn
NK	No. 163 Squadron RAF	163 Sqn
NK	No. 31 General Reconnaissance School RAF	31 GRS
NL	No. 316 (Polish) Squadron RAF	316 Polish Sqn
NL	No. 341 (French) Squadron RAF	341 French Sqn
NM	No. 230 Squadron RAF	230 Sqn
NM	No. 268 Squadron RAF	268 Sqn
NM	No. 76 Squadron RAF	86 Sqn
NN	No. 310 (Czech) Squadron RAF	310 Czech Sqn
NN	No. 8 Squadron RAAF (1943–45)	8 Sqn RAAF; SW Pacific
NO	No. 320 (Dutch) Squadron RAF	320 Dutch Sqn
NO	No. 85 Squadron RAF	85 Sqn
NP	No. 158 Squadron RAF	158 Sqn
NP	No. 195 Squadron RAF	195 Sqn
NQ	No. 24 Squadron RAF	24 Sqn
NQ	No. 43 Squadron RAF	43 Sqn
NR	No. 220 Squadron RAF	220 Sqn
NR	No. 605 Squadron RAF	605 Sqn
NS	No. 159 Squadron RAF	159 Sqn
NS	No. 201 Squadron RAF	201 Sqn
NS	No. 52 Operational Training Unit RAF	52 OTU
NT	No. 203 Squadron RAF	203 Sqn
NT	No. 29 Operational Training Unit RAF	29 OTU
NU	No. 1382 Conversion Unit RAF	1382 CU
NU	No. 240 Operational Conversion Unit RAF	240 OCU
NU	No. 242 Operational Conversion Unit RAF	242 OCU
NU	No. 625 Squadron RAF	625 Sqn
NV	No. 144 Squadron RAF	144 Sqn
NV	No. 79 Squadron RAF	89 Sqn
NW	No. 286 Squadron RAF	286 Sqn
NW	No. 3 Squadron RAAF (1940–41)	3 Sqn RAAF (sometimes 3 RAAF Sqn)
NW	No. 33 Squadron RAF	33 Sqn
NX	No. 131 Squadron RAF	131 Sqn
NZ	No. 304 (Polish) Squadron RAF	304 Polish Sqn
O	No. 202 Advanced Flying School RAF	202 AFS
O	No. 203 Advanced Flying School RAF	203 AFS
O	No. 205 Advanced Flying School RAF	205 AFS
O	Central Flying School	CFS
O	Flying Refresher School RAF	FRS
O	No. 101 Flying Refresher School RAF	10 FRS
O	No. 2 Flying Training School RAF	2 FTS
O	No. 3 Flying Training School RAF	3 FTS
O	No. 6 Flying Training School RAF	6 FTS
O	No. 7 Flying Training School RAF	7 FTS
O	No. 8 Flying Training School RAF	8 FTS
O	No. 9 Flying Training School RAF	9 FTS
O	No. 9 (Advanced) Flying Training School RAF	9 (A) FTS
O	No. 22 Flying Training School RAF	22 FTS
O	No. 22 Service Flying Training School RAF	22 SFTS
OA	No. 2 Squadron RAF	2 Sqn
OA	No. 223 Squadron RAF	223 Sqn
OA	No. 329 (French) Squadron RAF	329 French Sqn
OA	No. 342 (French) Squadron RAF	342 French Sqn
OB	No. 45 Squadron RAF	45 Sqn
OB	No. 260 Squadron RAF	260 Sqn
OB	No. 53 Operational Training Unit RAF	53 OTU
OC	Station Flight RAF Sandtoft	
OD	No. 80 Squadron RAF	80 Sqn
OD	No. 6 Operational Training Unit RAF	6 OTU
OD	No. 56 Operational Training Unit RAF	56 OTU
OE	No. 98 Squadron RAF	98 Sqn
OE	No. 168 Squadron RAF	168 Sqn
OE	No. 661 Squadron RAF	661 Sqn
OF	No. 97 Squadron RAF	97 Sqn
OG	No. 172 Squadron RAF	172 Sqn
OG	No. 315 (Polish) Squadron RAF	315 Polish Sqn
OG	No. 1332 Conversion Unit RAF	1332 CU
OG	No. 1665 Conversion Unit RAF	1665 CU
OH	No. 120 Squadron RAF	120 Sqn
OI	No. 2 Squadron RAF	2 Sqn
OJ	No. 149 Squadron RAF	149 Sqn
OK	No. 337 Squadron RAF	337 Sqn (not formed)
OK	No. 450 Squadron RAAF	450 Sqn RAAF (sometimes 450 RAAF Sqn)
OK	No. 3 School of General Reconnaissance RAF	3 S of GR
OL	No. 83 Squadron RAF	83 Sqn
OM	No. 11 Squadron RAF	11 Sqn
OM	No. 107 Squadron RAF	107 Sqn
OM	No. 119 Squadron RAF	119 Sqn
ON	No. 56 Squadron RAF	56 Sqn
ON	No. 63 Squadron RAF	63 Sqn
ON	No. 124 Squadron RAF	124 Sqn
ON	No. 623 Squadron RAF	623 Sqn
OO	No. 13 Squadron RAF	13 Sqn
OO	No. 164 Squadron RAF	164 Sqn
OO	No. 1663 Conversion Unit RAF	1663 CU
OP	No. 3 Squadron RAF	3 Sqn
OP	No. 11 Operational Training Unit RAF	11 OTU
OP	No. 32 Operational Training Unit RAF	32 OTU
OQ	No. 52 Operational Training Unit RAF	52 OTU
OQ	No. 5 Squadron RAF	5 Sqn
OQ	Fighter Leaders School RAF	FLS
OR	Bomb Ballistic Unit RAF	BBU
OS	No. 279 Squadron RAF	279 Sqn
OS	No. 349 (Belgium) Squadron RAF	349 Belgian Sqn
OS	Station Flight RAF Sturgate	
OT	No. 58 Squadron RAF	58 Sqn
OU	No. 485 Squadron RNZAF	485 Sqn RNZAF (sometimes 485 (NZ) Sqn)
OV	No. 197 Squadron RAF	197 Sqn
OV	No. 514 Squadron RAF	514 Sqn
OW	No. 426 Squadron RCAF	426 Sqn RCAF (sometimes 426 (RCAF) Sqn)
OX	No. 40 Squadron RAF	40 Sqn
OX	No. 22 Operational Training Unit RAF	22 OTU
OY	No. 13 Operational Training Unit RAF	13 OTU
OY	No. 11 Squadron RAF	11 Sqn
OY	No. 48 Squadron RAF	48 Sqn
OZ	No. 82 Squadron RAF	82 Sqn
OZ	No. 179 Squadron RAF	179 Sqn
OZ	No. 210 Squadron RAF	210 Sqn
OZ	24 Squadron SAAF	24 Sqn SAAF
O3	Bomber Command Development Unit RAF	BCDU
O5	Bomber Support Development Unit RAF	BSDU
O8	Station Flight RAF Merryfield	

=== P-T ===
Squadron code	Unit	Unit shorthand
P	No. 202 Advanced Flying School RAF	202 AFS
P	No. 207 Advanced Flying School RAF	207 AFS
P	No. 1 Flying Training School RAF	1 FTS
P	No. 2 Flying Training School RAF	2 FTS
P	No. 3 Flying Training School RAF	3 FTS
P	No. 6 Flying Training School RAF	6 FTS
P	No. 7 Flying Training School RAF	7 FTS
P	No. 9 Flying Training School RAF	9 FTS
P	No. 22 Flying Training School RAF	22 FTS
P	No. 207 Flying Training School RAF	207 FTS
P	No. 9 (Advanced) Flying Training School RAF	9 (A)FTS
P	No. 10 (Advanced) Flying Training School RAF	10 (A)FTS
P	No. 22 Service Flying Training School RAF	22 SFTS
PA	No. 55 Operational Training Unit RAF	55 OTU
PA	No. 655 Squadron RAF	655 Sqn
PA	No. 3 Tactical Exercise Unit RAF	3 TEU
PB	No. 10 Squadron RAF	10 Sqn
PB	No. 655 Squadron RAF	655 Sqn
PB	No. 1684 Flight RAF	1684 Flt
PB	No. 26 Operational Training Unit RAF	26 OTU
PC	No. 655 Squadron RAF	655 Sqn
PD	No. 87 Squadron RAF	87 Sqn
PD	No. 303 (Polish) Squadron RAF	303 Polish Sqn (1945–46)
PD	No. 450 Squadron RAAF	450 Sqn RAAF (sometimes 450 RAAF Sqn)
PD	No. 655 Squadron RAF	655 Sqn
PE	No. 1662 Conversion Unit RAF	1662 CU
PF	No. 516 Squadron RAF	516 Sqn
PF	No. 43 Operational Training Unit RAF	43 OTU
PF	No. 51 Operational Training Unit RAF	51 OTU
PF	No. 227 Operational Training Unit RAF	227 OTU
PF	Air Observation Post School RAF	AOPS
PG	No. 608 (North Riding) Squadron RAF	608 Sqn
PG	No. 619 Squadron RAF	619 Sqn
PH	No. 12 Squadron RAF	12 Sqn
PI	Station Flight RAF Silverstone	
PJ	No. 59 Squadron RAF	59 Sqn
PJ	No. 130 Squadron RAF	130 Sqn
PK	No. 124 Squadron RAF	124 Sqn
PK	No. 220 Squadron RAF	220 Sqn
PK	No. 315 (Polish) Squadron RAF	315 Polish Sqn
PL	No. 144 Squadron RAF	144 Sqn
PL	No. 341 (French) Squadron RAF	341 French Sqn
PM	No. 20 Squadron RAF	20 Sqn
PM	No. 103 Squadron RAF	103 Sqn
PN	No. 41 Squadron RAF	41 Sqn
PN	No. 252 Squadron RAF	252 Sqn
PN	No. 1552 Flight RAF	1552 Flt
PO	No. 46 Squadron RAF	46 Sqn
PO	No. 104 Squadron RAF	104 Sqn
PO	No. 463 Squadron RAAF	463 Sqn RAAF (sometimes 463 RAAF Sqn)
PO	No. 467 Squadron RAAF	467 Sqn RAAF (sometimes 467 RAAF Sqn)
PP	No. 203 Squadron RAF	203 Sqn
PP	No. 311 (Czech) Squadron RAF	311 Czech Sqn
PP	No. 25 Operational Training Unit RAF	25 OTU
PQ	No. 206 Squadron RAF	206 Sqn
PQ	No. 324 Squadron RAF	324 Sqn (not formed)
PQ	No. 2 Tactical Exercise Unit RAF	2 TEU
PQ	No. 58 Operational Training Unit RAF	58 OTU
PR	No. 407 Squadron RCAF	407 Sqn RCAF (sometimes 407 (RCAF) Sqn)
PR	No. 609 (West Riding) Squadron RAF	609 Sqn
PS	No. 264 Squadron RAF	264 Sqn
PT	No. 27 Squadron RAF	27 Sqn
PT	No. 420 Squadron RCAF	420 Sqn RCAF (sometimes 420 (RCAF) Sqn)
PU	No. 53 Squadron RAF	53 Sqn
PU	No. 187 Squadron RAF	187 Sqn
PU	No. 198 Squadron RAF	198 Sqn
PV	No. 275 Squadron RAF	275 Sqn
PW	No. 224 Squadron RAF	224 Sqn
PW	No. 57 Operational Training Unit RAF	57 OTU
PX	No. 95 Squadron RAF	95 Sqn
PX	No. 214 Squadron RAF	214 Sqn
PY	No. 84 Squadron RAF	84 Sqn
PY	No. 1527 Flight RAF	1527 Flt
PZ	No. 53 Squadron RAF	53 Sqn
PZ	No. 456 Squadron RAAF	456 Sqn RAAF (sometimes 456 RAAF Sqn)
PZ	No. 638 Squadron RAF	638 Sqn (not formed)
P2	Station Flight RAF Marston Moor	
P3	No. 692 Squadron RAF	692 Sqn
P4	No. 153 Squadron RAF	153 Sqn
P5	No. 297 Squadron RAF	297 Sqn
P6	No. 489 Squadron RNZAF	489 (RNZAF) Sqn (sometimes 489 Sqn RNZAF)
P6	Station Flight RAF Banff	
P8	No. 87 Group Communication Flight RAF	87 Gp Comm Flt
P8	No. 87 Wing Communication Flight RAF	87 Wg Comm Flt
P9	No. 58 Operational Training Unit RAF	58 OTU
Q	Air/Sea Warfare Development Unit RAF	A/SWDU
Q	Central Flying School	CFS
Q	No. 2 Flying Training School RAF	2 FTS
Q	No. 3 Flying Training School RAF	3 FTS
Q	No. 7 Flying Training School RAF	7 FTS
Q	No. 14 (Advanced) Flying Training School RAF	14 (A)FTS
QA	No. 654 Squadron RAF	654 Sqn
QB	No. 212 Squadron RAF	212 Sqn
QB	No. 424 Squadron RCAF	424 Sqn RCAF (sometimes 424 (RCAF) Sqn)
QB	No. 654 Squadron RAF	654 Sqn
QC	No. 168 Squadron RAF	168 Sqn
QC	No. 654 Squadron RAF	654 Sqn
QD	No. 654 Squadron RAF	654 Sqn
QD	No. 42 Squadron RAF	42 Sqn
QD	No. 304 (Polish) Squadron RAF	304 Polish Sqn
QE	No. 12 Squadron RAF	12 Sqn
QE	Central Fighter Establishment	CFE
QF	No. 98 Squadron RAF	98 Sqn
QF	No. 177 Squadron RAF	177 Sqn
QF	No. 1323 Flight RAF	1323 Flt
QF	Navigation Training Unit RAF	NTU
QG	No. 53 Operational Training Unit RAF	53 OTU
QH	No. 298 Squadron RAF	298 Sqn
QH	No. 302 (Polish) Squadron RAF	302 Polish Sqn (1945–46)
QI	Station Flight RAF Swanton Morley	
QJ	No. 92 Squadron RAF	92 Sqn
QJ	No. 616 Squadron RAF	616 Sqn
QJ	British Air Forces of Occupation Communication Squadron RAF	BAFO Comm Sqn.
QK	No. 248 Squadron RAF	248 Sqn
QK	No. 3 Armament Practice Station RAF	3 APS
QL	No. 286 Squadron RAF	286 Sqn
QL	No. 413 Squadron RCAF	424 Sqn RCAF (sometimes 413 (RCAF) Sqn)
QL	No. 76 Wing Calibration Flight RAF	76 Wg Cal Flt
QM	No. 42 Squadron RAF	42 Sqn
QM	No. 254 Squadron RAF	254 Sqn
QM	No. 276 Squadron RAF	276 Sqn
QN	No. 5 Squadron RAF	5 Sqn
QN	No. 214 Squadron RAF	214 Sqn
QN	No. 28 Operational Training Unit RAF	28 OTU
QO	No. 3 Squadron RAF	3 Sqn
QO	No. 167 Squadron RAF	167 Sqn
QO	No. 432 Squadron RCAF	432 Sqn RCAF (sometimes 432 (RCAF) Sqn)
QP	Station Flight RAF Kirmington	
QQ	No. 83 Squadron RAF	83 Sqn
QQ	No. 1662 Conversion Unit RAF	1662 CU
QR	No. 61 Squadron RAF	61 Sqn
QR	No. 223 Squadron RAF	223 Sqn
QS	No. 192 Squadron RAF	192 Sqn
QS	No. 620 Squadron RAF	620 Sqn
QT	No. 57 Squadron RAF	57 Sqn
QT	No. 67 Squadron RAF	67 Sqn
QT	No. 142 Squadron RAF	142 Sqn
QU	No. 326 (French) Squadron RAF	326 French Sqn
QU	Royal Air Force Northern Ireland Communication Flight RAF	RAF NI Comm Flt
QU	Headquarters Royal Air Force Northern Ireland Communication Flight RAF	HQ RAF NI Comm Flt
QV	No. 19 Squadron RAF	19 Sqn
QW	No. 1516 Flight RAF	1516 Flt
QX	No. 50 Squadron RAF	50 Sqn
QX	No. 224 Squadron RAF	224 Sqn
QX	Coastal Command Communication Flight RAF	Coastal Cmd Comm Flt
QY	No. 254 Squadron RAF	254 Sqn
QY	No. 262 Squadron RAF	262 Sqn
QY	No. 452 Squadron RAAF (1943–45)	452 Sqn RAAF, in SW Pacific.
QY	No. 1666 Conversion Unit RAF	1666 CU
QZ	No. 643 Squadron RAF	643Sqn (not formed)
QZ	No. 4 Operational Training Unit RAF	4 OTU
Q3	No. 613 Squadron RAF	613 Sqn
Q6	No. 1384 Conversion Unit RAF	1384 CU
Q7	No. 29 Maintenance Unit RAF	29 MU
R	No. 205 Advanced Flying School RAF	205 AFS
R	Central Flying School	CFS
R	No. 2 Flying Training School RAF	2 FTS
R	No. 3 Flying Training School RAF	3 FTS
R	No. 22 Flying Training School RAF	22 FTS
R	No. 22 Service Flying Training School RAF	22 SFTS
RA	No. 100 Squadron RAF	100 Sqn
RA	No. 410 Squadron RCAF	410 Sqn RCAF (sometimes 410 (RCAF) Sqn)
RAA	No. 500 Squadron RAF	500 Sqn
RAB	No. 501 Squadron RAF	501 Sqn
RAC	No. 502 Squadron RAF	502 Sqn
RAD	No. 504 Squadron RAF	504 Sqn
RAG	No. 600 Squadron RAF	600 Sqn
RAH	No. 601 Squadron RAF	601 Sqn
RAI	No. 602 Squadron RAF	602 Sqn
RAJ	No. 603 Squadron RAF	603 Sqn
RAK	No. 604 Squadron RAF	604 Sqn
RAL	No. 605 Squadron RAF	605 Sqn
RAN	No. 607 Squadron RAF	607 Sqn
RAO	No. 608 Squadron RAF	608 Sqn
RAP	No. 609 Squadron RAF	609 Sqn
RAQ	No. 610 Squadron RAF	610 Sqn
RAR	No. 611 Squadron RAF	611 Sqn
RAS	No. 612 Squadron RAF	612 Sqn
RAT	No. 613 Squadron RAF	613 Sqn
RAU	No. 614 Squadron RAF	614 Sqn
RAV	No. 615 Squadron RAF	615 Sqn
RAW	No. 616 Squadron RAF	616 Sqn
RB	No. 66 Squadron RAF	66 Sqn
RB	No. 10 Squadron RAAF	10 Sqn RAAF (sometimes 10 RAAF Sqn)
RC	No. 5 Lancaster Finishing School RAF	5 LFS
RCA	Reserve Command Communication Squadron RAF	Res Cmd Comm Sqn.
RCB	No. 12 Reserve Flying School RAF	12 RFS
RCC	No. 13 Reserve Flying School RAF	13 RFS
RCD	No. 12 Reserve Flying School RAF	12 RFS
RCD	No. 15 Reserve Flying School RAF	15 RFS
RCE	No. 61 Group Communication Flight RAF	61 Grp Comm Flt
RCF	No. 62 Group Communication Flight RAF	62 Grp Comm Flt
RCG	No. 63 Group Communication Flight RAF	63 Grp Comm Flt
RCH	No. 64 Group Communication Flight RAF	64 Grp Comm Flt
RCI	No. 66 Group Communication Flight RAF	66 Grp Comm Flt
RCJ	No. 17 Reserve Flying School RAF	17 RFS
RCK	No. 3 Reserve Flying School RAF	3 RFS
RCL	No. 14 Reserve Flying School RAF	14 RFS
RCM	No. 1 Reserve Flying School RAF	1 RFS
RCN	No. 4 Reserve Flying School RAF	4 RFS
RCO	No. 6 Reserve Flying School RAF	6 RFS
RCP	No. 7 Reserve Flying School RAF	7 RFS
RCQ	No. 8 Reserve Flying School RAF	8 RFS
RCR	No. 11 Reserve Flying School RAF	11 RFS
RCS	No. 16 Reserve Flying School RAF	16 RFS
RCT	No. 18 Reserve Flying School RAF	18 RFS
RCU	No. 22 Reserve Flying School RAF	22 RFS
RCV	No. 24 Reserve Flying School RAF	24 RFS
RCW	No. 25 Reserve Flying School RAF	25 RFS
RCX	No. 2 Reserve Flying School RAF	2 RFS
RCY	No. 5 Reserve Flying School RAF	5 RFS
RCZ	No. 9 Reserve Flying School RAF	9 RFS
RD	No. 67 Squadron RAF	67 Sqn
RE	No. 118 Squadron RCAF	118 Sqn RCAF* (1940–42)
RE	No. 229 Squadron RAF	229 Sqn
RE	Central Fighter Establishment RAF	CFE
RF	No. 204 Squadron RAF	204 Sqn
RF	No. 303 (Polish) Squadron RAF	303 Polish Sqn (1940–45)
RF	No. 1510 Flight RAF	1510 Flt
RG	No. 208 Squadron RAF	208 Sqn
RG	No. 510 Squadron RAF	510 Sqn
RG	No. 1472 Flight RAF	1472 Flt
RG	Station Flight RAF Earls Colne	
RH	No. 88 Squadron RAF	88 Sqn
RH	No. 179 Squadron RAF	179 Sqn
RJ	No. 46 Squadron RAF	46 Sqn
RJ	Station Flight RAF Thornaby	
RK	No. 131 Squadron RAF	131 Sqn
RL	No. 38 Squadron RAF	38 Sqn
RL	No. 279 Squadron RAF	279 Sqn
RL	No. 603 Squadron RAF	603 Sqn
RM	No. 26 Squadron RAF	26 Sqn
RM	No. 140 Squadron RAF	140 Sqn
RN	No. 72 Squadron RAF	82 Sqn
RN	No. 93 Squadron RAF	93 Sqn
RO	No. 29 Squadron RAF	29 Sqn
RO	No. 174 Squadron RAF	174 Sqn
RO	No. 32 Operational Training Unit RAF	32 OTU
ROA	No. 661 Squadron RAF	661 Sqn
ROA	No. 1957 Flight RAF	1957 Flt
ROA	No. 1958 Flight RAF	1958 Flt
ROA	No. 1959 Flight RAF	1959 Flt
ROA	No. 1960 Flight RAF	1960 Flt
ROA	No. 1961 Flight RAF	1961 Flt
ROB	No. 662 Squadron RAF	662 Sqn
ROB	No. 1956 Flight RAF	1956 Flt
ROB	No. 1962 Flight RAF	1962 Flt
ROB	No. 1963 Flight RAF	1963 Flt
ROC	No. 663 (Polish Second Corps AOP) Squadron RAF	663 Sqn Polish AOP
ROC	No. 1951 Flight RAF	1951 Flt
ROC	No. 1952 Flight RAF	1952 Flt
ROC	No. 1953 Flight RAF	1953 Flt
ROC	No. 1954 Flight RAF	1954 Flt
ROC	No. 1955 Flight RAF	1955 Flt
ROD	No. 664 Squadron RAF	664 Sqn
ROD	No. 1964 Flight RAF	1964 Flt
ROD	No. 1965 Flight RAF	1965 Flt
ROD	No. 1969 Flight RAF	1969 Flt
ROD	No. 1970 Flight RAF	1970 Flt
ROG	No. 666 Squadron RAF	666 Sqn
ROG	No. 1966 Flight RAF	1966 Flt
ROG	No. 1967 Flight RAF	1967 Flt
ROG	No. 1968 Flight RAF	1968 Flt
RP	No. 288 Squadron RAF	288 Sqn
RQ	No. 193 Squadron RAF	193 Sqn
RQ	Station Flight RAF Colerne	
RR	No. 407 Squadron RCAF	407 Sqn RCAF (sometimes 407 (RCAF) Sqn)
RR	No. 615 Squadron RAF	615 Sqn
RR	Station Flight RAF Filton	
RS	No. 229 Operational Conversion Unit RAF	229 OCU
RS	No. 30 Squadron RAF	30 Sqn
RS	No. 157 Squadron RAF	157 Sqn
RS	No. 171 Squadron RAF	171 Sqn
RSA	No. 23 Reserve Flying School RAF	23 RFS
RSB	No. 10 Reserve Flying School RAF	10 RFS
RT	No. 112 Squadron RAF	112 Sqn
RT	No. 114 Squadron RAF	114 Sqn
RT	No. 147 Squadron RAF	147 Sqn
RU	Station Flight RAF Hendon	
RU	No. 414 Squadron RCAF	414 Sqn RCAF (sometimes 414 (RCAF) Sqn)
RUA	Aberdeen University Air Squadron	Aber UAS
RUB	Birmingham University Air Squadron	Birm UAS
RUC	Cambridge University Air Squadron	Camb UAS
RUD	Durham University Air Squadron	Dur UAS
RUE	Edinburgh University Air Squadron	Edin UAS
RUG	Glasgow University Air Squadron	Glas UAS
RUL	London University Air Squadron	Lond UAS
RUL	University of London Air Squadron	U o LAS
RUM	Manchester University Air Squadron	Man UAS
RUN	Nottingham University Air Squadron	Nott UAS
RUO	Oxford University Air Squadron	Oxf UAS
RUQ	Queens University Air Squadron	Qu UAS
RUS	St. Andrews University Air Squadron	St And UAS
RUY	Leeds University Air Squadron	Leeds UAS
RUZ	Southampton University Air Squadron	Soton UAS
RV	No. 1659 Conversion Unit RAF	1659 CU
RW	No. 36 Squadron RAF	36 Sqn
RX	No. 25 Squadron RAF	25 Sqn
RX	No. 456 Squadron RAAF	456 Sqn RAAF (sometimes 456 RAAF Sqn)
RY	No. 278 Squadron RAF	278 Sqn
RY	No. 313 (Czech) Squadron RAF	313 Czech Sqn
RZ	No. 513 Squadron RAF	513 Sqn
RZ	No. 241 Squadron RAF	241 Sqn
R1	'R' Flight, No. 1 Anti-Aircraft Co-operation Unit RAF	'R' Flt, 1 AACU
R2	Pilotless Aircraft Unit RAF	PAU
R4	No. 18 Armament Practice Camp RAF	18 APC
R4	No. 1 Armament Practice Station RAF	1 APS
R8	No. 274 Maintenance Unit RAF	274 MU
S	No. 78 Squadron RAF	88 Sqn
S	No. 208 Squadron RAF	208 Sqn
S	No. 207 Advanced Flying School RAF	207 AFS
S	No. 1564 Flight RAF	1564 Flt
S	Central Flying School	CFS
S	Royal Air Force Technical College	RAFTC
S	No. 3 Flying Training School RAF	3 FTS
S	No. 8 Flying Training School RAF	8 FTS
S	No. 8 (Advanced) Flying Training School RAF	8 (A) FTS
SA	No. 486 Squadron RNZAF	486 (RNZAF) Sqn 486 Sqn RNZAF (sometimes
SB	No. 464 Squadron RAAF	464 RAAF (sometimes 464 RAAF Sqn)
SC	Station Flight RAF Prestwick	
SD	No. 72 Squadron RAF	82 Sqn
SD	No. 501 Squadron RAF	501 Sqn
SE	No. 95 Squadron RAF	94 Sqn
SE	No. 431 Squadron RCAF	431 Sqn RCAF (sometimes 431 (RCAF) Sqn)
SF	No. 39 Squadron RAF	39 Sqn
SF	No. 137 Squadron RAF	137 Sqn
SG	No. 626 Squadron RAF	626 Sqn
SH	No. 64 Squadron RAF	64 Sqn
SH	No. 216 Squadron RAF	216 Sqn
SH	No. 240 Squadron RAF	240 Sqn
SJ	No. 96 Squadron RAF	96 Sqn
SJ	No. 21 Operational Training Unit RAF	21 OTU
SK	No. 165 Squadron RAF	165 Sqn
SK	No. 263 Squadron RAF	263 Sqn
SL	No. 13 Operational Training Unit RAF	13 OTU
SM	No. 272 Squadron RAF	272 Sqn
SM	No. 305 (Polish) Squadron RAF	305 Sqn
SN	No. 243 Squadron RAF	243 Sqn
SN	No. 511 Squadron RAF	511 Sqn
SN	No. 230 Operational Conversion Unit RAF	230 OCU
SO	No. 33 Squadron RAF	33 Sqn
SO	No. 145 Squadron RAF	145 Sqn
SP	No. 320 Squadron RAF	320 Dutch Sqn
SP	No. 110 Squadron RCAF	110 Sqn RCAF*
SP	No. 400 Squadron RCAF	400 Sqn RCAF (sometimes 400 (RCAF) Sqn)
SP	Station Flight RAF Prestwick	
SQ	No. 500 Squadron RAF	500 Sqn
SR	No. 101 Squadron RAF	101 Sqn
SR	No. 281 Squadron RAF	281 Sqn
SS	No. 129 Squadron RAF	129 Sqn
SS	No. 1552 Flight RAF	1552 Flt
ST	No. 228 Operational Conversion Unit RAF	228 OCU
ST	No. 54 Operational Training Unit RAF	54 OTU
SU	No. 235 Squadron RAF	235 Sqn
SU	Station Flight RAF Prestwick	
SV	No. 218 Squadron RAF	218 Sqn
SV	No. 1663 Conversion Unit RAF	1663 CU
SW	No. 1678 Flight RAF	1678 Flt
SW	No. 43 Squadron RAF	43 Sqn
SW	No. 253 Squadron RAF	253 Sqn
SW	No. 517 Squadron RAF	517 Sqn
SW	No. 1678 Conversion Unit RAF	1678 CU
SW	No. 1678 Flight RAF	1678 Flt
SX	No. 1 Coast Artillery Co-operation Unit/Flight RAF	1 CACU/Flt
SX	Station Flight RAF Methwold	
SY	No. 139 Squadron RAF	139 Sqn
SY	No. 613 Squadron RAF	613 Sqn
SZ	No. 256 Squadron RAF	256 Sqn
SZ	No. 316 (Polish) Squadron RAF	316 Polish Sqn
S6	No. 41 Group Communication Flight RAF	41 Gp Comm Flt
S6	Maintenance Command Communication Flight RAF	Maint Cmd Comm Flt
S7	No. 500 Squadron RAF	500 Sqn
S8	No. 328 (French) Squadron RAF	328 French Sqn
S9	No. 16 Group Communication Flight RAF	16 Gp Comm Flt
T	No. 15 Squadron RAF	15 Sqn
T	No. 36 Squadron RAF	36 Sqn
T	No. 74 Squadron RAF	84 Sqn
T	No. 79 Squadron RAF	89 Sqn
T	No. 112 Squadron RAF	112 Sqn
T	No. 204 Squadron RAF	204 Sqn
T	No. 220 Squadron RAF	220 Sqn
T	No. 249 Squadron RAF	249 Sqn
T	No. 256 Squadron RAF	256 Sqn
T	No. 1 Coastal Patrol Flight RAF	1 CP Flt
T	No. 1417 Flight RAF	1417 Flt
T	No. 3 Flying Training School RAF	3 FTS
T	No. 14 (Advanced) Flying Training School RAF	4 (A)FTS
TA	2 Squadron SAAF	2 Sqn SAAF
TA	No. 358 Squadron RAF	358 Sqn
TA	No. 235 Operational Conversion Unit RAF	235 OCU
TA	No. 4 Operational Training Unit RAF	4 OTU
TAL	Communication Flight Aldermaston RAF	
TB	No. 51 Squadron RAF	51 Sqn
TB	No. 77 Squadron RAF	77 Sqn
TB	No. 153 Squadron RAF	153 Sqn
TB	No. 156 Squadron RAF	156 Sqn
TBR	RAF Staff College Flight	RAF SC Flt
TC	No. 170 Squadron RAF	170 Sqn
TCA	No. 1 Radio School RAF	1 RS
TCE	Station Flight RAF Carew Cheriton	
TCN	Station Flight RAF Cranwell	
TCO	Station Flight RAF Cosford	
TCR	No. 1 Radio School RAF	1 RS
TCW	Station Flight RAF Carew Cheriton	
TD	No. 132 Squadron RAF	132 Sqn
TD	No. 320 (Dutch) Squadron RAF	320 Dutch Sqn
TD	No. 453 Squadron RAAF (1941–42)	453 Sqn RAAF (sometimes 453 RAAF Sqn); in Malaya/Singapore
TD	No. 82 Operational Training Unit RAF	82 OTU
TDE	Empire Radio School RAF	ERS
TE	No. 53 Squadron RAF	53 Sqn
TE	No. 1401 Flight RAF	1401 Flt
TE	Station Flight RAF Carew Cheriton	
TF	No. 620 Squadron RAF	620 Sqn
TF	No. 29 Operational Training Unit RAF	29 OTU
TF	No. 127 Squadron RCAF	127 Sqn RCAF* (1942–43)
TFA	School of Photography RAF	S of P
TH	No. 20 Squadron RAF	20 Sqn
TH	No. 418 Squadron RCAF	418 Sqn RCAF (sometimes 418 (RCAF) Sqn)
THA	Station Flight RAF Halton	
THE	Parachute Test Unit RAF	PTU
THI	Aeroplane & Armament Experimental Establishment	A& AEE
THL	No. 24 Group Communication Flight RAF	24 Gp Comm Flt
THO	Station Flight RAF Hornchurch	
TIH	No. 1 RAF Film Unit	1 RAF FU
TJ	7 Squadron SAAF	7 Sqn SAAF
TJ	No. 202 Squadron RAF	202 Sqn
TJ	No. 272 Squadron RAF	272 Sqn
TJ	No. 52 Operational Training Unit RAF	52 OTU
TK	No. 143 Squadron RAF	143 Sqn
TK	No. 149 Squadron RAF	149 Sqn
TL	No. 35 Squadron RAF	35 Sqn
TL	No. 253 Squadron RAF	253 Sqn
TLO	Station Flight RAF Locking	
TM	No. 111 Squadron RCAF	111 Sqn RCAF*
TM	No. 504 Squadron RAF	504 Sqn
TMA	No. 4 Radio School RAF	4 RS
TMD	No. 4 Radio School RAF	4 RS
TME	No. 4 Radio School RAF	4 RS
TML	No. 4 Radio School RAF	4 RS
TN	No. 33 Squadron RAF	33 Sqn
TN	No. 30 Operational Training Unit RAF	30 OTU
TO	No. 228 Squadron RAF	228 Sqn
TO	No. 61 Operational Training Unit RAF	61 OTU
TO	No. 203 Advanced Flying School RAF	203 AFS
TO	No. 226 Operational Conversion Unit RAF	226 OCU
TO	No. 228 Operational Conversion Unit RAF	228 OCU
TOC	Officers Advanced Training School RAF	OATS
TP	No. 73 Squadron RAF	83 Sqn
TP	No. 198 Squadron RAF	198 Sqn
TP	No. 277 Squadron RAF	277 Sqn
TR	No. 59 Squadron RAF	59 Sqn
TR	No. 238 Squadron RAF	238 Sqn
TQ	No. 102 Squadron RAF	102 Sqn
TQ	No. 202 Squadron RAF	202 Sqn
TQ	Station Flight RAF Bramcote	
TS	No. 137 Squadron RAF	137 Sqn
TS	No. 548 Squadron RAF	548 Sqn
TS	No. 657 Squadron RAF	657 Sqn
TS	No. 1900 Flight RAF	1900 Flt
TS	No. 1901 Flight RAF	1901 Flt
TSA	Station Flight RAF St Athan	
TSI	RAF (Belgian) Training School RAF	RAF (Bel) TS
TSM	No. 4 Radio School RAF	4 RS
TSN	RAF (Belgian) Training School RAF	RAF (Bel) TS
TSO	No. 27 Group Communication Flight RAF	27 Gp Comm Flt
TT	No. 289 Squadron RAF	289 Sqn
TT	No. 1658 Conversion Unit RAF	1658 CU
TTE	No. 22 Group Communication Flight RAF	22 Gp Comm Flt
TU	Station Flight RAF Dyce	
TU	No. 1 Torpedo Unit RAF	1 TU
TV	No. 4 Squadron RAF	4 Sqn
TV	No. 151 Squadron RAF	151 Sqn
TV	No. 173 Squadron RAF	173 Sqn
TV	No. 1660 Conversion Unit RAF	1660 CU
TW	No. 90 Squadron RAF	90 Sqn
TW	No. 141 Squadron RAF	141 Sqn
TWM	School of Photography RAF	S of Phot
TWY	Technical Training Command Communication Flight RAF	TT Cmd Comm Flt
TX	No. 130 Squadron RAF	130 Sqn
TX	No. 11 Operational Training Unit RAF	11 OTU
TY	No. 24 Operational Training Unit RAF	24 OTU
T2	No. 46 Maintenance Unit RAF	46 MU
T5	Station Flight RAF Abingdon	
T6	Station Flight RAF Melbourne	
T7	No. 650 Squadron RAF	650 Sqn

=== U-Z ===
Squadron code	Unit	Unit shorthand
U	No. 8 Flying Training School RAF	8 FTS
U	No. 8 (Advanced) Flying Training School RAF	8 (A)FTS
U	No. 22 Flying Training School RAF	22 FTS
U	No. 22 Service Flying Training School RAF	22 SFTS
UA	No. 269 Squadron RAF	269 Sqn
UB	No. 63 Squadron RAF	63 Sqn
UB	No. 164 Squadron RAF	164 Sqn
UB	No. 304 (Polish) Squadron RAF	304 Polish Sqn
UB	No. 455 Squadron RAAF	455 Sqn RAAF (sometimes 455 RAAF Sqn)
UD	No. 141 Squadron RAF	141 Sqn
UD	No. 452 Squadron RAAF (1941–42)	452 Sqn RAAF (sometimes 452 RAAF Sqn), in UK.
UE	No. 200 Squadron RAF	200 Sqn
UE	No. 228 Squadron RAF	228 Sqn
UF	No. 601 Squadron RAF	601 Sqn
UF	No. 622 Squadron RAF	622 Sqn
UF	No. 24 Operational Training Unit RAF	24 OTU
UG	No. 16 Squadron RAF	16 Sqn
UG	No. 310 (Czech) Squadron RAF	310 Czech Sqn
UG	No. 1654 Conversion Unit RAF	1654 CU
UH	No. 21 Operational Training Unit RAF	21 OTU
UH	No. 1682 Flight RAF	1682 Flt
UJ	No. 27 Operational Training Unit RAF	27 OTU
UK	No. 637 Squadron RAF	637 Sqn (not formed)
UL	No. 178 Squadron RAF	178 Sqn
UL	No. 576 Squadron RAF	576 Sqn
UL	No. 608 Squadron RAF	608 Sqn
UM	No. 152 Squadron RAF	152 Sqn
UM	No. 626 Squadron RAF	626 Sqn
UN	No. 126 Squadron RAF	126 Sqn
UN	Station Flight RAF Faldingworth	
UO	No. 266 Squadron RAF	266 Sqn
UO	No. 19 Operational Training Unit RAF	19 OTU
UP	No. 605 Squadron RAF	605 Sqn
UP	No. 4 Squadron RAF	4 Sqn
UP	No. 222 Squadron RAF	222 Sqn
UQ	No. 211 Squadron RAF	211 Sqn
UQ	No. 512 Squadron RAF	512 Sqn
UQ	No. 1508 Flight RAF	1508 Flt
UR	No. 84 Squadron RAF	84 Sqn
UR	No. 13 Operational Training Unit RAF	13 OTU
US	No. 28 Squadron RAF	28 Sqn
US	No. 56 Squadron RAF	56 Sqn
UV	No. 8 Squadron RAAF (1941–42)	8 Sqn RAAF (sometimes 8 RAAF Sqn); Malaya, Singapore & Java.
UT	No. 17 Squadron RAF	17 Sqn
UT	No. 51 Squadron RAF	51 Sqn
UT	No. 461 Squadron RAAF	461 Sqn RAAF (sometimes 461 RAAF Sqn)
UU	No. 61 Operational Training Unit RAF	61 OTU
UU	No. 226 Operational Conversion Unit RAF	226 OCU
UV	No. 17 Squadron RAF	17 Sqn
UV	No. 460 Squadron RAAF	460 Sqn RAAF (sometimes 460 RAAF Sqn)
UW	No. 3 Tactical Exercise Unit RAF	3 TEU
UW	No. 55 Operational Training Unit RAF	55 OTU
UX	No. 82 Squadron RAF	82 Sqn
UX	No. 214 Squadron RAF	214 Sqn
UX	No. 1476 Flight RAF	1476 Flt
UX	Central Fighter Establishment	CFE
UY	No. 314 Squadron RAF	314 Sqn (not formed as a flying unit)
UY	No. 10 Operational Training Unit RAF	10 OTU
UZ	No. 292 Squadron RAF	292 Sqn
UZ	No. 306 (Polish) Squadron RAF	306 Polish Sqn
U2	Station Flight RAF Talbenny	
U3	Radio Warfare Establishment RAF	RWE
U4	No. 667 Squadron RAF	667 Sqn
U5	No. 3 Ferry Pool RAF	3 FP
U5	No. 51 Maintenance Unit RAF	51 MU
U6	No. 436 Squadron RCAF	436 Sqn RCAF (sometimes 436 (RCAF) Sqn)
U7	No. 1697 Flight RAF	1697 Flt
V	No. 126 Squadron RAF	126 Sqn
V	No. 1435 Flight RAF	1435 Flt
V	No. 1435 Squadron RAF	1435 Sqn
VA	No. 84 Squadron RAF	84 Sqn
VA	No. 125 Squadron RAF	125 Sqn
VA	No. 264 Squadron RAF	264 Sqn
VA	No. 282 Squadron RAF	282 Sqn
VB	No. 221 Squadron RAF	221 Sqn
VB	No. 334 (Norway) Squadron RAF	334 Norwegian Sqn
VB	No. 14 Operational Training Unit RAF	14 OTU
VD	Central Gunnery School RAF	CGS
VD	No. 123 Squadron RCAF	123 Sqn RCAF*
VE	No. 110 Squadron RAF	110 Sqn
VE	No. 319 Squadron RAF	319 Sqn (not formed)
VE	Station Flight RAF Kirton-in-Lindsey	
VF	Station Flight RAF Lindholme	
VF	No. 99 Squadron RAF	99 Sqn
VG	No. 210 Squadron RAF	210 Sqn
VG	No. 285 Squadron RAF	285 Sqn
VI	No. 169 Squadron RAF	169 Sqn
VJ	No. 503 Squadron RAF	503 Sqn
VK	No. 238 Squadron RAF	238 Sqn
VK	No. 307 Polish Night Fighter Squadron	307 Polish Sqn
VK	No. 85 Group Communication Flight RAF	85 Gp Comm Flt
VL	12 Squadron SAAF	12 Sqn SAAF
VL	No. 167 Squadron RAF	167 Sqn
VL	No. 322 (Dutch) Squadron RAF	322 Dutch Sqn
VM	No. 231 Squadron RAF	231 Sqn
VM	No. 244 Squadron RAF	244 Sqn
VM	No. 1561 Flight RAF	1561 Flt
VN	No. 50 Squadron RAF	50 Sqn
VN	No. 333 (Norway) Squadron RAF	333 Norwegian Sqn
VO	No. 98 Squadron RAF	98 Sqn
VP	No. 259 Squadron RAF	259 Sqn
VP	Station Flight RAF Exeter	
VQ	No. 201 Squadron RAF	201 Sqn
VQ	No. 18 Operational Training Unit RAF	18 OTU
VR	No. 22 Squadron RAF	22 Sqn
VR	No. 419 Squadron RCAF	419 Sqn RCAF (sometimes 419 (RCAF) Sqn)
VS	No. 31 Squadron RAF	31 Sqn
VS	Metropolitan Communication Squadron RAF	MC Sqn
VT	No. 30 Squadron RAF	30 Sqn
VT	No. 216 Squadron RAF	216 Sqn
VT	No. 1556 Flight RAF	1556 Flt
VU	No. 36 Squadron RAF	36 Sqn
VU	No. 246 Squadron RAF	246 Sqn
VV	No. 288 Squadron RAF	288 Sqn
VV	Station Flight RAF Sumburgh	
VW	Station Flight RAF Chedburgh	
VW	No. 157 Squadron RAF	157 Sqn
VW	No. 118 Squadron RCAF	118 Sqn (1943)
VX	No. 206 Squadron RAF	206 Sqn
VY	No. 85 Squadron RAF	85 Sqn
VY	No. 249 Squadron RAF	249 Sqn
VZ	No. 412 Squadron RCAF	412 Sqn RCAF (sometimes 412 (RCAF) Sqn)
VZ	No. 636 Squadron RAF	636 Sqn (not formed)
V4	No. 6 Maintenance Unit RAF	6 MU
V6	No. 615 Squadron RAF	615 Sqn
V6	Radio Warfare Establishment RAF	RWE
V7	Central Signals Establishment RAF	CSE
V8	No. 570 Squadron RAF	570 Sqn
V9	No. 502 Squadron RAF	502 Sqn
W	No. 234 Squadron RAF	234 Sqn
W	No. 205 Advanced Flying School RAF	205 AFS
W	No. 3 Air Navigation School RAF	3 ANS
W	Central Flying School	CFS
W	No. 4 Flying Training School RAF	4 FTS
W	No. 5 Flying Training School RAF	5 FTS
W	No. 8 Flying Training School RAF	8 FTS
W	No. 8 (Advanced) Flying Training School RAF	8 (A)FTS
WA	No. 264 Squadron RAF	264 Sqn
WB	No. 181 Squadron RAF	181 Sqn
WB	Bomber Command Instructors School RAF	BCIS
WB	Bomber Command Instrument Rating and Examining Flight RAF	BCIR&E Flt
WC	No. 309 (Polish) Squadron RAF	309 Polish Sqn
WD	No. 206 Squadron RAF	206 Sqn
WD	Station Flight RAF Leeming	
WE	No. 59 Squadron RAF	59 Sqn
WE	No. 23 Operational Training Unit RAF	23 OTU
WF	No. 238 Squadron RAF	238 Sqn
WF	No. 525 Squadron RAF	525 Sqn
WG	No. 128 Squadron RAF	128 Sqn
WG	No. 26 Operational Training Unit RAF	26 OTU
WH	No. 330 (Norway) Squadron RAF	330 Norwegian Sqn
WH	Armament Practice Station Acklington	APS Acklington
WI	No. 69 Squadron RAF	69 Sqn
WJ	No. 167 Squadron RAF	167 Sqn
WJ	No. 17 Operational Training Unit RAF	17 OTU
WK	No. 81 Squadron RAF	81 Sqn
WK	No. 135 Squadron RAF	135 Sqn
WK	No. 1310 Flight RAF	1310 Flt
WK	No. 1316 Flight RAF	1316 Flt
WL	No. 434 Squadron RCAF	434 Sqn RCAF (sometimes 434 (RCAF) Sqn)
WL	No. 612 Squadron RAF	612 Sqn
WL	Station Flight RAF Leeming	
WM	No. 68 Squadron RAF	68 Sqn
WM	No. 122 Squadron RAF	122 Sqn
WN	No. 527 Squadron RAF	527 Sqn
WO	No. 138 Squadron RAF	138 Sqn
WP	No. 90 Squadron RAF	90 Sqn
WQ	No. 209 Squadron RAF	209 Sqn
WQ	No. 604 Squadron RAF	604 Sqn
WQ	No. 12 Group Communication Flight RAF	12 Gp Comm Flt
WR	No. 248 Squadron RAF	248 Sqn
WR	Station Flight RAF Moreton-in-the-Marsh	
WR	40 Squadron SAAF	40 Sqn SAAF
WS	No. 9 Squadron RAF	9 Sqn
WS	No. 275 Squadron RAF	275 Sqn
WT	No. 35 Squadron RAF	35 Sqn
WT	Station Flight RAF Stornoway	
WU	No. 225 Squadron RAF	225 Sqn
WU	No. 317 (Polish) Squadron RAF	317 Polish Sqn
WV	No. 18 Squadron RAF	18 Sqn
WW	No. 332 (Norway) Squadron RAF	332 Norwegian Sqn
WX	No. 302 (Polish) Squadron RAF	302 Polish Sqn (1940–45)
WX	No. 627 Squadron RAF	627 Sqn
WY	No. 541 Squadron RAF	541 Sqn
WY	No. 261 Squadron RAF	261 Sqn
WY	No. 28 Operational Training Unit RAF	28 OTU
WZ	No. 19 Squadron RAF	19 Sqn
WZ	Station Flight RAF Graveley	
W2	No. 80 Squadron RAF	80 Sqn
W3	Station Flight RAF Hemswell	
W4	Glider Pick-up Training Flight RAF	GPTF
W5	Station Flight RAF Castle Camps	
W6	No. 18 Maintenance Unit RAF	18 MU
X	No. 229 Squadron RAF	229 Sqn
X	No. 603 Squadron RAF	603 Sqn
X	No. 203 Advanced Flying School RAF	203 AFS
X	No. 205 Advanced Flying School RAF	205 AFS
X	No. 3 Air Navigation School RAF	3 ANS
X	Central Flying School	CFS
X	No. 2 Flying Training School RAF	2 FTS
X	No. 4 Flying Training School RAF	4 FTS
X	No. 5 Flying Training School RAF	5 FTS
X	No. 6 Flying Training School RAF	6 FTS
X	No. 8 Flying Training School RAF	8 FTS
X	No. 8 (Advanced) Flying Training School	8 (A)FTS
XA	No. 489 Squadron RAF	489 Sqn
XA	No. 640 Squadron RAF	640 Sqn
XA	Essex Sector Communication Flight RAF	ES Comm Flt
XB	No. 224 Squadron RAF	224 Sqn
XB	No. 239 Squadron RAF	239 Sqn
XB	No. 2 Tactical Exercise Unit RAF	2 TEU
XC	No. 26 Squadron RAF	26 Sqn
XD	No. 139 Squadron RAF	139 Sqn
XD	No. 188 Squadron RAF	188 Sqn
XD	No. 13 Operational Training Unit RAF	13 OTU
XE	No. 6 Squadron RAF	6 Sqn
XE	Central Bomber Establishment RAF	CBE
XF	No. 168 Squadron RAF	168 Sqn
XF	No. 19 Operational Training Unit RAF	19 OTU
XG	No. 16 Operational Training Unit RAF	16 OTU
XH	No. 218 Squadron RAF	218 Sqn
XH	No. 296 Squadron RAF	296 Sqn
XJ	No. 293 Squadron RAF	293 Sqn
XJ	No. 13 Operational Training Unit RAF	13 OTU
XK	No. 46 Squadron RAF	46 Sqn
XK	No. 272 Squadron RAF	272 Sqn
XL	No. 346 (French) Squadron RAF	346 French Sqn
XL	No. 20 Operational Training Unit RAF	20 OTU
XL	No. 226 Operational Conversion Unit RAF	226 OCU
XL	No. 1335 Conversion Unit RAF	1335 CU
XM	No. 182 Squadron RAF	182 Sqn
XM	No. 1902 Flight RAF	1902 Flt
XM	No. 1903 Flight RAF	1903 Flt
XM	No. 1904 Flight RAF	1904 Flt
XM	No. 1905 Flight RAF	1905 Flt
XM	No. 1908 Flight RAF	1908 Flt
XM	No. 1909 Flight RAF	1909 Flt
XM	No. 652 Squadron RAF	652 Sqn
XN	No. 232 Squadron RAF	232 Sqn
XN	No. 22 Operational Training Unit RAF	22 OTU
XO	No. 57 Operational Training Unit RAF	57 OTU
XO	No. 112 Squadron RAF	112 Sqn
XP	No. 174 Squadron RAF	174 Sqn
XP	No. 318 (Polish) Squadron RAF	318 Polish Sqn
XP	No. 457 Squadron RAAF (1943)	457 Sqn RAAF, in SW Pacific.
XQ	No. 64 Squadron RAF	64 Sqn
XQ	No. 86 Squadron RAF	86 Sqn
XR	No. 71 Squadron RAF	71 Sqn
XR	No. 2 Group Communication Flight RAF	2 Gp Comm Flt
XS	No. 106 Squadron RAF	106 Sqn
XT	No. 335 (Greek) Squadron RAF	335 Greek Sqn
XT	No. 603 Squadron RAF	603 Sqn
XT	No. 1657 Conversion Unit RAF	1657 CU
XU	No. 7 Squadron RAF	8 Sqn
XU	No. 49 Squadron RAF	49 Sqn
XV	No. 2 Squadron RAF	2 Sqn
XV	No. 309 (Polish) Squadron RAF	309 Polish Sqn
XW	No. 18 Operational Training Unit RAF	18 OTU
XX	No. 631 Squadron RAF	631 Sqn
XY	No. 90 Squadron RAF	90 Sqn
XY	No. 136 Squadron RAF	136 Sqn
XY	No. 186 Squadron RAF	186 Sqn
XY	No. 203 Advanced Flying School RAF	203 AFS
XZ	No. 39 Squadron RAF	39 Sqn
XZ	No. 153 Squadron RAF	153 Sqn
X2	Station Flight RAF Stoney Cross	
X3	No. 111 Operational Training Unit RAF	111 OTU
X6	No. 290 Squadron RAF	290 Sqn
X8	No. 6 Group Communication Flight RAF	6 Gp Comm Flt
X9	No. 299 Squadron RAF	299 Sqn
Y	No. 205 Advanced Flying School RAF	205 AFS
Y	No. 206 Advanced Flying School RAF	206 AFS
Y	No. 1 Flying Training School RAF	1 FTS
Y	No. 22 Flying Training School RAF	22 FTS
Y	No. 22 Service Flying Training School RAF	22 SFTS
YA	No. 68 Squadron RAF	68 Sqn
YA	Station Flight RAF Netheravon	
YA	No. 14 Squadron RCAF	14 Sqn RCAF* (1942–43)
YB	Station Flight RAF Bentwaters	
YB	No. 17 Squadron RAF	17 Sqn
YB	No. 29 Squadron RAF	29 Sqn
YD	No. 242 Squadron RAF	242 Sqn
YD	No. 255 Squadron RAF	255 Sqn
YE	No. 250 Squadron RAF	250 Sqn
YE	No. 289 Squadron RAF	289 Sqn
YF	No. 280 Squadron RAF	280 Sqn
YF	No. 505 Squadron RAF	505 Sqn (not formed)
YF	Station Flight RAF Scampton	
YG	No. 156 Squadron RAF	156 Sqn
YG	No. 502 Squadron RAF	502 Sqn
YG	No. 646 Squadron RAF	646 Sqn (not formed)
YH	No. 21 Squadron RAF	21 Sqn
YH	No. 11 Squadron RAF	11 Sqn
YI	No. 423 Squadron RCAF	423 Sqn RCAF (sometimes 423 (RCAF) Sqn)
YJ	No. 152 Squadron RAF	152 Sqn
YJ	Station Flight RAF Metheringham	
YK	No. 80 Squadron RAF	80 Sqn
YK	No. 274 Squadron RAF	274 Sqn
YK	No. 340 (French) Squadron RAF	340 French Sqn
YL	No. 27 Operational Training Unit RAF	27 OTU
YM	No. 350 (Belgium) Squadron RAF	350 Belgian Sqn
YM	No. 1528 Flight RAF	1528 Flt
YM	No. 1529 Flight RAF	1529 Flt
YN	No. 601 Squadron RAF	601 Sqn
YO	No. 8 Squadron RAF	8 Sqn
YO	No. 401 Squadron RCAF	401 Sqn RCAF (sometimes 401 (RCAF) Sqn)
YO	Station Flight RAF Down Ampney	
YP	No. 23 Squadron RAF	23 Sqn
YP	No. 165 Squadron RAF	165 Sqn
YQ	No. 217 Squadron RAF	217 Sqn
YQ	No. 616 Squadron RAF	616 Sqn
YR	No. 133 Squadron RAF	133 Sqn
YR	No. 20 Operational Training Unit RAF	20 OTU
YS	No. 77 Squadron RAF	87 Sqn
YS	No. 271 Squadron RAF	271 Sqn
YT	No. 65 Squadron RAF	65 Sqn
YT	No. 648 Squadron RAF	648 Sqn (not formed)
YU	Station Flight RAF Lossiemouth	
YV	No. 287 Squadron RAF	287 Sqn
YV	No. 48 Group Communication Flight RAF	48 Gp Comm Flt
YW	No. 515 Squadron RAF(Apr 1939 – Sep 1939)	515 Sqn
YW	No. 1660 Conversion Unit RAF	1660 CU
YW	No. 230 Operational Conversion Unit RAF	230 OCU
YX	No. 54 Operational Training Unit RAF	54 OTU
YX	No. 614 Squadron RAF	614 Sqn
YY	No. 1332 Conversion Unit RAF	1332 CU
YY	No. 241 Operational Conversion Unit RAF	241 OCU
YY	No. 78 Squadron RAF	88 Sqn
YZ	No. 146 Squadron RAF	146 Sqn
YZ	No. 617 Squadron RAF	617 Sqn
YZ	No. 1651 Conversion Unit RAF	1651 CU
Y2	No. 442 Squadron RCAF	442 Sqn RCAF (sometimes 442 (RCAF) Sqn)
Y3	No. 202 Squadron RAF	202 Sqn
Y3	No. 518 Squadron RAF	518 Sqn
Y5	Station Flight RAF Dallachy	
Z	No. 205 Advanced Flying School RAF	205 AFS
Z	No. 3 Air Navigation School RAF	3 ANS
Z	No. 229 Operational Conversion Unit RAF	229 OCU
Z	No. 5 Flying Training School RAF	5 FTS
ZA	No. 10 Squadron RAF	10 Sqn
ZA	No. 31 Squadron RAF	31 Sqn
ZA	Metropolitan Communication Flight RAF	Metro Comm Flt
ZB	No. 1658 Conversion Unit RAF	1658 CU
ZD	No. 6 Squadron RAF	6 Sqn
ZD	No. 116 Squadron RAF	116 Sqn
ZD	No. 222 Squadron RAF	222 Sqn
ZE	No. 52 Squadron RAF	52 Sqn
ZE	No. 123 Squadron RAF	123 Sqn
ZE	No. 293 Squadron RAF	293 Sqn
ZE	Central Fighter Establishment	CFE
ZF	No. 308 Polish Fighter Squadron	308 Polish Sqn
TS	No. 548 Squadron RAF	548 (RAF) Sqn, in SW Pacific under RAAF operational command, 1943–45; or 548 Sqn RAF
ZF	No. 549 Squadron RAF	549 (RAF) Sqn, in SW Pacific under RAAF operational command, 1943–45; or 549 Sqn RAF
ZG	No. 94 Squadron RAF	94 Sqn
ZG	No. 322 (Dutch) Squadron RAF	322 Dutch Sqn
ZG	No. 10 Operational Training Unit RAF	10 OTU
ZH	No. 266 Squadron RAF	266 Sqn
ZH	No. 501 Squadron RAF	501 Sqn
ZJ	No. 96 Squadron RAF	96 Sqn
ZJ	No. 271 Squadron RAF	271 Sqn
ZK	No. 24 Squadron RAF	24 Sqn
ZK	No. 25 Squadron RAF	25 Sqn
ZL	No. 77 Squadron RAF	87 Sqn
ZL	No. 427 Squadron RCAF	427 Sqn RCAF (sometimes 427 (RCAF) Sqn)
ZM	No. 185 Squadron RAF	185 Sqn
ZM	No. 201 Squadron RAF	201 Sqn
ZN	No. 106 Squadron RAF	106 Sqn
ZN	No. 300 Polish Bomber Squadron	300 Polish Sqn
ZO	No. 196 Squadron RAF	196 Sqn
ZP	15 Squadron SAAF	15 Sqn SAAF
ZP	No. 74 Squadron RAF	74 Sqn
ZP	No. 336 (Greek) Squadron RAF	336 Greek Sqn
ZP	No. 457 Squadron RAAF (1943–45)	457 Sqn RAAF; SW Pacific.
ZP	No. 1473 Flight RAF	1473 Flt
ZP	No. 25 Operational Training Unit RAF	25 OTU
ZQ	No. 322 (Dutch) Squadron RAF	322 Dutch Sqn
ZQ	Bomber Command Instructors School RAF	BCIS
ZQ	Fighter Interception Unit RAF	FIU
ZQ	Central Fighter Establishment RAF	CFE
ZR	No. 309 (Polish) Squadron RAF	309 Polish Sqn
ZR	No. 613 Squadron RAF	613 Sqn
ZR	No. 2 Operational Training Unit RAF	2 OTU
ZR	No. 107 Operational Training Unit RAF	107 OTU
ZR	No. 1333 Conversion Unit RAF	1333 CU
ZS	No. 233 Squadron RAF	233 Sqn
ZS	No. 647 Squadron RAF	647 Sqn (not formed)
ZS	No. 1336 Conversion Unit RAF	1336 CU
ZT	No. 97 Squadron RAF	97 Sqn
ZT	No. 258 Squadron RAF	258 Sqn
ZT	No. 602 Squadron RAF	602 Sqn
ZT	No. 20 Operational Training Unit RAF	20 OTU
ZU	No. 1664 Conversion Unit RAF	1664 CU
ZV	No. 19 Operational Training Unit RAF	19 OTU
ZW	No. 48 Squadron RAF	48 Sqn
ZW	No. 140 Squadron RAF	140 Sqn
ZW	No. 1359 Flight RAF	1359 Flt
ZX	No. 145 Squadron RAF	145 Sqn Polish Fighting Team
ZX	Polish Fighting Team	PFT
ZX	No. 3 Tactical Exercise Unit RAF	3 TEU
ZX	No. 55 Operational Training Unit RAF	55 OTU
ZY	No. 247 Squadron RAF	247 Sqn
ZZ	No. 220 Squadron RAF	220 Sqn
Z2	No. 437 Squadron RCAF	437 Sqn RCAF (sometimes 437 (RCAF) Sqn)
Z4	No. 10 Maintenance Unit RAF	10 MU
Z5	No. 462 Squadron RAF	462 Sqn
Z8	No. 45 Maintenance Unit RAF	45 MU
Z9	No. 519 Squadron RAF	519 Sqn

=== Numbers ===
squadron code	unit	unit shorthand
1	No. 59 Squadron RAF	59 Sqn
1	No. 172 Squadron RAF	172 Sqn
1	No. 206 Squadron RAF	206 Sqn
1	No. 407 Squadron RCAF	407 Sqn RCAF (sometimes 407 (RCAF) Sqn)
1	No. 601 Squadron RAF	601 Sqn
1	No. 3 School of General Reconnaissance RAF	3 S of GR
1	No. 1 Radio School RAF	1 RS
1C	Station Flight RAF Scampton	
2	No. 143 Squadron RAF	143 Sqn
2	No. 220 Squadron RAF	220 Sqn
2	No. 304 (Polish) Squadron RAF	304 Polish Sqn
2	No. 404 Squadron RCAF	404 Sqn RCAF (sometimes 404 (RCAF) Sqn)
2	No. 407 Squadron RCAF	407 Sqn RCAF (sometimes 407 (RCAF) Sqn)
2	No. 422 Squadron RCAF	422 Sqn RCAF (sometimes 422 (RCAF) Sqn)
2	No. 455 Squadron RAAF	455 Sqn RAAF (sometimes 455 RAAF Sqn)
2	No. 603 Squadron RAF	603 Sqn
2	No. 3 School of General Reconnaissance RAF	3 S of GR
2	No. 2 Radio School RAF	2 RS
2A	Station Flight RAF St Eval	
2B	No. 272 Maintenance Unit RAF	272 MU
2H	Station Flight RAF Brawdy	
2I	No. 443 Squadron RCAF	443 Sqn RCAF (sometimes 443 (RCAF) Sqn)
2K	No. 1668 Conversion Unit RAF	1668 CU
2L	No. 9 Maintenance Unit RAF	9 MU
2M	No. 520 Squadron RAF	520 Sqn
2N	Station Flight RAF Foulsham	
2O	No. 84 Group Communication Flight RAF	84 Gp Comm Flt
2P	No. 644 Squadron RAF	644 Sqn
2Q	No. 88 Group Communication Flight RAF	88 Gp Comm Flt
2V	No. 18 Group Communication Flight RAF	18 Gp Comm Flt
2V	No. 547 Squadron RAF	547 Sqn
2W	No. 3 School of General Reconnaissance RAF	3 SofGR
2X	No. 85 Operational Training Unit RAF	85 OTU
2Y	No. 345 (French) Squadron RAF	345 Sqn
3	No. 280 Squadron RAF	280 Sqn
3	No. 423 Squadron RCAF	423 Sqn RCAF (sometimes 423 (RCAF) Sqn)
3	No. 601 Squadron RAF	601 Sqn
3	No. 3 School of General Reconnaissance RAF	3 S of GR
3B	No. 23 Maintenance Unit RAF	23 MU
3C	No. 1 Lancaster Finishing School RAF	1 LFS
3D	No. 4 Ferry Pool RAF	4 FP
4D	No. 74 Squadron RAF	74 Sqn
4D	No. 48 Maintenance Unit RAF	48 MU
3E	No. 100 Group Communication Flight RAF	100 Gp Comm Flt
3F	British Air Forces of Occupation Communication Wing RAF	BAFO Comm Wg
3G	No. 111 Operational Training Unit RAF	111 OTU
3H	No. 80 Operational Training Unit RAF	85 OTU
3J	No. 13 Maintenance Unit RAF	13 MU
3K	No. 1695 Flight RAF	1695 Flt
3L	Fighter Command Control and Reporting School RAF	FCC&RS
3M	No. 679 Squadron RAF	679 Sqn
3M	No. 48 Group Communication Flight RAF	48 Gp Comm Flt
3O	Station Flight RAF Wratting Common	
3P	No. 515 Squadron RAF (Feb 1944 – Jun 1945)	515 Sqn
3S	No. 3 Group Communication Flight RAF	3 Gp Comm Flt
3T	Station Flight RAF Acaster Malbis	
3V	No. 1 Group Communication Flight RAF	1 Gp Comm Flt
3W	No. 322 (Dutch) Squadron RAF	322 Dutch Sqn
3X	No. 38 Maintenance Unit RAF	38 MU
3Y	No. 577 Squadron RAF	577 Sqn
4	No. 3 School of General Reconnaissance RAF	3 SofGR
4	No. 4 Radio School RAF	4 RS
4A	No. 2 Group Communication Flight RAF	2 Gp Comm Flt
4B	No. 5 Group Communication Flight RAF	5 Gp Comm Flt
4D	No. 74 Squadron RAF	84 Sqn
4E	No. 1687 Flight RAF	1687 Flt
4H	No. 142 Squadron RAF	142 Sqn
4J	No. 5 Maintenance Unit RAF	5 MU
4K	Station Flight RAF West Malling	
4L	Station Flight RAF Melton Mowbray	
4M	No. 695 Squadron RAF	956 Sqn
4Q	No. 59 Operational Training Unit RAF	59 OTU
4Q	Coastal Command Fighter Affiliation Unit RAF	CCFAU
4S	Central Signals Establishment RAF	CSE
4T	Station Flight RAF Portreath	
4U	No. 30 Maintenance Unit RAF	30 MU
4W	Station Flight RAF Snaith	
4X	No. 230 Squadron RAF	230 Sqn
4X	No. 1692 Flight RAF	1692 Flt
4Z	No. 1699 Flight RAF	1699 Flt
4Z	No. 1699 Conversion Unit RAF	1699 CU
4Z	Bomber Command Communication Squadron RAF	BC Comm Sqn
5	No. 3 School of General Reconnaissance RAF	3 S of GR
5	School of Air Sea Rescue RAF	S of ASR
5	No. 5 Middle East Training School RAF	5 METS
5	No. 10 Radio School RAF	10 RS
5A	No. 329 (French) Squadron RAF	329 French Sqn
5D	Station Flight RAF Gibraltar	
5F	No. 147 Squadron RAF	147 Sqn
5G	No. 299 Squadron RAF	299 Sqn
5H	Station Flight RAF Chivenor	
5I	Station Flight RAF Benson	
5J	No. 126 Squadron RAF	126 Sqn
5K	No. 39 Maintenance Unit RAF	39 MU
5N	No. 38 Group Communication Flight RAF	38 Gp Comm Flt
5O	No. 521 Squadron RAF	521 Sqn
5R	No. 33 Squadron RAF	33 Sqn
5S	No. 691 Squadron RAF	691 Sqn
5T	No. 233 Squadron RAF	233 Sqn
5V	No. 439 Squadron RCAF	439 Sqn RCAF (sometimes 439 (RCAF) Sqn)
6	No. 600 Squadron RAF	600 Sqn
6	No. 11 Radio School RAF	11 RS
6B	Station Flight RAF Tempsford	
6C	Photographic Reconnaissance Development Unit RAF	PRDU
6D	No. 631 Squadron RAF	631 Sqn
6F	No. 1669 Conversion Unit RAF	1669 CU
6G	No. 223 Squadron RAF	223 Sqn
6H	No. 96 Squadron RAF	96 Sqn
6H	No. 1688 Flight RAF	1688 Flt
6J	No. 34 Squadron RAF	34 Sqn
6O	No. 582 Squadron RAF	582 Sqn
6Q	Station Flight RAF Pembroke Dock	
6R	No. 41 Operational Training Unit RAF	41 OTU
6T	No. 608 Squadron RAF	608 Sqn
6U	No. 415 Squadron RCAF	415 Sqn RCAF (sometimes 415 (RCAF) Sqn)
6V	Station Flight RAF Cottesmore	
6Y	No. 171 Squadron RAF	171 Sqn
6Z	No. 19 Maintenance Unit RAF	19 MU
7	No. 12 Radio School RAF	12 RS
7A	No. 614 Squadron RAF	614 Sqn
7B	No. 5 Squadron RAF	5 Sqn
7C	No. 595 Squadron RAF	595 Sqn
7D	No. 296 Squadron RAF	296 Sqn
7E	No. 327 (French) Squadron RAF	327 French Sqn
7G	Station Flight RAF Northolt	
7H	No. 84 Group Communication Flight RAF	84 Gp Comm Flt
7I	Station Flight RAF Acklington	
7K	Survival and Rescue Training Unit RAF	S&RTU
7L	No. 59 Operational Training Unit RAF	59 OTU
7M	No. 1 Parachute Training School RAF	1 PTS
7N	Signals Flying Unit RAF	SFU
7R	No. 524 Squadron RAF	524 Sqn
7S	No. 83 Group Support Unit RAF	83 Gp SU
7T	No. 169 Squadron RAF	169 Sqn
7U	Station Flight RAF Bardney	
7X	Station Flight RAF Aldergrove	
7Z	No. 1381 Conversion Unit RAF	1381 CU
8A	No. 298 Squadron RAF	298 Sqn
8B	No. 1508 Flight RAF	1508 Flt
8C	No. 12 Maintenance Unit RAF	12 MU
8D	No. 220 Squadron RAF	220 Sqn
8E	No. 295 Squadron RAF	295 Sqn
8F	No. 105 Operational Training Unit RAF	105 OTU
8F	No. 1381 Conversion Unit RAF	1381 CU
8H	No. 8 Group Communication Flight RAF	8 Gp Comm Flt
8I	No. 2 Armament Practice Station	2 APS
8I	Armament Practice Station Acklington	APS Acklington
8K	No. 571 Squadron RAF	571 Sqn
8L	No. 92 Squadron RAF	92 Sqn
8P	No. 525 Squadron RAF	525 Sqn
8Q	No. 34 Squadron RAF	34 Sqn
8T	No. 298 Squadron RAF	298 Sqn
8U	Station Flight RAF Ballykelly	
8V	No. 6 Operational Training Unit RAF	6 OTU
8V	No. 60 Operational Training Unit RAF	60 OTU
8W	No. 612 Squadron RAF	612 Sqn
8Y	No. 15 Maintenance Unit RAF	15 MU
8Z	No. 295 Squadron RAF	295 Sqn
9C	No. 82 Operational Training Unit RAF	82 OTU
9E	British Air Forces of Occupation Communication Squadron RAF	BAFO Comm Sqn
9F	Station Flight RAF Stradishall	
9G	No. 441 Squadron RCAF	441 Sqn RCAF (sometimes 441 (RCAF) Sqn)
9I	No. 326 (French) Squadron RAF	326 French Sqn
9J	No. 227 Squadron RAF	227 Sqn
9K	No. 1 Torpedo Training Unit RAF	1 TTU
9M	No. 1690 Flight RAF	1690 Flt
9N	No. 127 Squadron RAF	127 Sqn
9O	No. 44 Maintenance Unit RAF	44 MU
9P	No. 85 Operational Training Unit RAF	85 OTU
9R	No. 229 Squadron RAF	229 Sqn
9T	Signals Flying Unit RAF	SFU
9U	No. 644 Squadron RAF	644 Sqn
9W	No. 296 Squadron RAF	296 Sqn
9X	No. 2 Ferry Pool RAF	2 FP
9Y	No. 20 Maintenance Unit RAF	20 MU
9Y	No. 132 Operational Training Unit RAF	132 OTU
09	No. 9 Group Target Towing Flight RAF	9 Gp TTF
10	No. 10 Group Target Towing Flight RAF	10 Gp TTF
11	No. 11 Group Target Towing Flight RAF	11 Gp TTF
12	No. 12 Group Target Towing Flight RAF	12 Gp TTF
13	No. 13 Group Target Towing Flight RAF	13 Gp TTF
26	No. 26 Anti-Aircraft Co-operation Unit RAF	26 AACU
33	No. 15 Squadron SAAF	15 Sqn SAAF

* = RAAF/RCAF unit that was not under RAF operational control.

== Radio call signs ==
=== Transport Command 'O' series ===
Transport Command RAF applied the following three letter call-signs to its aircraft from 1944. Individual aircraft were given letter suffixes, making the code a four letter sequence.

Call signs
call sign	unit	unit shorthand
OAA	No. 24 Squadron RAF	24 Sqn
OAP	Air Dispatch Letter Squadron	ADLS
ODA	No. 24 Squadron RAF	24 Sqn
ODC	No. 238 Squadron RAF & No. 436 Squadron RAF	238 Sqn & 436 Sqn
ODE	No. 62 Squadron RAF	62 Sqn
ODF	No. 147 Squadron RAF	147 Sqn
ODJ	No. 78 Squadron RAF	78 Sqn
ODK	No. 512 Squadron RAF & No. 241 Squadron RAF	512 Sqn & 241 Sqn
ODM	No. 436 Squadron RAF	436 Sqn
ODN	No. 271 Squadron RAF	271 Sqn
ODO	No. 437 Squadron RAF	437 Sqn
ODP	No. 216 Squadron RAF	216 Sqn
ODR	No. 48 Squadron RAF	48 Sqn
ODS	No. 575 Squadron RAF	575 Sqn
ODT	No. 53 Squadron RAF	53 Sqn
ODU	No. 77 Squadron RAF & No. 31 Squadron RAF	77 Sqn & 31 Sqn
ODV	No. 10 Squadron RAF	10 Sqn
ODW	No. 52 Squadron RAF	52 Sqn
ODY	No. 1333 (Transport) Conversion Unit RAF	1333 (T)CU
ODZ	British Overseas Airways Corporation	BOAC
OFA	No. 10 Squadron RAF & No. 437 Squadron RAF	10 Sqn & 437 Sqn
OFB	No. 77 Squadron RAF & No. 271 Squadron RAF	77 Sqn & 271 Sqn
OFD	No. 575 Squadron RAF	575 Sqn
OFG	No. 46 Squadron RAF	46 Sqn
OFN	No. 575 Squadron RAF	575 Sqn
OFR	No. 238 Squadron RAF	238 Sqn
OFT	No. 187 Squadron RAF	187 Sqn
OFU	No. 233 Squadron RAF	233 Sqn
OFV	No. 271 Squadron RAF	271 Sqn
OFZ	British Overseas Airways Corporation	BOAC
OHC	No. 1665 Heavy Conversion Unit RAF	1665 HCU
OHD	No. 301 Polish Bomber Squadron	301 Sqn
OHL	No. 113 Squadron RAF	113 Sqn
OKD	No. 24 Squadron RAF	24 Sqn
OKZ	British Overseas Airways Corporation	BOAC
OLB	No. 246 Squadron RAF	246 Sqn
OLL	No. 111 Operational Training Unit RAF	111 OTU
OLM	No. 206 Squadron RAF	206 Sqn
OLN	No. 466 Squadron RAF	466 Sqn
OLP	No. 426 Squadron RAF	426 Sqn
OLW	No. 86 Squadron RAF	86 Sqn
OLX	No. 220 Squadron RAF	220 Sqn
OLZ	British Overseas Airways Corporation	BOAC
OQZ	British Overseas Airways Corporation	BOAC
ORJ	No. 51 Squadron RAF	51 Sqn
ORK	No. 242 Squadron RAF	242 Sqn
ORL	No. 46 Squadron RAF	46 Sqn
ORO	No. 158 Squadron RAF	158 Sqn
ORP	No. 196 Squadron RAF & No. 299 Squadron RAF	196 Sqn & 299 Sqn
ORS	No. 299 Squadron RAF	299 Sqn
ORT	No. 1588 (Heavy Freight) Flight RAF	1588 (HF)Flt
OSD	No. 232 Squadron RAF	232 Sqn
OSK	No. 233 Squadron RAF	233 Sqn
OXG	No. 163 Squadron RAF	163 Sqn
OYA	No. 511 Squadron RAF	511 Sqn
OYB	No. 246 Squadron RAF	246 Sqn
OYC	No. 511 Squadron RAF	511 Sqn
OYD	No. 24 Squadron RAF	24 Sqn
OYF	No. 242 Squadron RAF	242 Sqn
OYZ	No. 1384 Conversion Unit RAF	1384 CU

=== Transport Command 'MO' series ===
From 1945, RAF Transport Command pre-fixed the three letter call-signs with M. With individual aircraft allocated letter suffixes, the call-signs became five letter sequences.

call sign	unit	unit shorthand
MOAY	No. 31 Squadron RAF	31 Sqn
MOAZ	Colerne Communication Squadron RAF	Colerne Comm. Sqn.
MOBC	No. 242 Operational Conversion Unit RAF	242 OCU
MOBM	No. 84 Squadron RAF	84 Sqn
MODA	No. 24 Squadron RAF & No. 1 Parachute and Glider Training School RAF	24 Sqn & 1 P&GTS
MODB	No. 53 Squadron RAF	53 Sqn
MODC	No. 24 Squadron RAF, No. 27 Squadron RAF & No. 62 Squadron RAF	24 Sqn, 27 Sqn & 62 Sqn
MODD	No. 238 Squadron RAF	238 Sqn
MODF	No. 30 Squadron RAF & Airwork Ltd	30 Sqn & Airwork
MODG	Queens Flight RAF	Queens Flt
MODW	Silver City Airways	Silver City
MOFA	No. 18 Squadron RAF	18 Sqn
MOFB	No. 77 Squadron RAF	77 Sqn
MOFC	Unknown – possibly 62Sqn	
MOFG	No. 46 Squadron RAF & No. 114 Squadron RAF	46 Sqn & 114 Sqn
MOGA	No. 53 Squadron RAF & No. 99 Squadron RAF	53 Sqn & 99 Sqn
MOGB	No. 47 Squadron RAF	47 Sqn
MOGC	No. 242 Operational Conversion Unit RAF	242 OCU
MOGH	No. 70 Squadron RAF	70 Sqn
MOGP	No. 48 Squadron RAF	48 Sqn
MOGX	Unknown – possibly an Abingdon Wing or Sqn	
MOGZ	No. 24 Squadron RAF	24 Sqn
MOHA	No. 297 Squadron RAF	297 Sqn
MOHC	No. 295 Squadron RAF & No. 113 Squadron RAF	295 Sqn & 113 Sqn
MOHD	No. 47 Squadron RAF	47 Sqn
MOJA	No. 99 Squadron RAF	99 Sqn
MOKD	No. 24 Squadron RAF	24 Sqn
MOLG	Queens Flight RAF	Queens Flt
MONY	Metropolitan Communication Squadron RAF	Metro Comm. Sqn.
MOPT	2nd Tactical Air Force Communication Squadron RAF	2TAF Comm. Sqn.
MORC	No. 242 Operational Conversion Unit RAF	242 OCU
MORG	No. 30 Squadron RAF	30 Sqn
MORK	Unknown	
MORM	No. 84 Squadron RAF	84 Sqn
MORT	2nd Tactical Air Force Communication Squadron RAF	2TAF Comm. Sqn.
MOSC	No. 30 Squadron RAF	30 Sqn
MOTA	No. 216 Squadron RAF	216 Sqn
MOVF	No. 622 Squadron RAF & Airwork Ltd.	622 Sqn & Airwork
MOWA	No. 40 Squadron RAF	40 Sqn
MOWB	No. 59 Squadron RAF	59 Sqn
MOYA	No. 51 Squadron RAF	51 Sqn
MOYB	No. 59 Squadron RAF	59 Sqn
MOYC	No. 511 Squadron RAF	511 Sqn
MOYD	No. 24 Squadron RAF & No. 59 Squadron RAF	24 Sqn & 59 Sqn
MOYF	No. 242 Squadron RAF	242 Sqn
MOYG	No. 206 Squadron RAF	206 Sqn
MOYX	No. 242 Squadron RAF	242 Sqn
MOYU	Supreme Commander's Headquarters Communication Squadron RAF	SCH Comm. Sqn.

== See also ==
- United Kingdom military aircraft registration number
- United Kingdom aircraft test serials
- British military aircraft designation systems
Royal Air Force
- List of Royal Air Force aircraft squadrons
- List of Royal Air Force aircraft independent flights
- List of conversion units of the Royal Air Force
- List of Royal Air Force Glider units
- List of Royal Air Force Operational Training Units
- List of RAF Regiment units
- List of Battle of Britain squadrons
- List of wings of the Royal Air Force
- Royal Air Force roundels

Army Air Corps

- List of Army Air Corps aircraft units

Fleet Air Arm

- List of Fleet Air Arm aircraft squadrons
- List of Fleet Air Arm groups
- List of aircraft units of the Royal Navy
- List of aircraft wings of the Royal Navy

Others

- List of Air Training Corps squadrons
