= List of Hawker Typhoon operators =

The List of Hawker Typhoon operators lists the countries and their air force units that have operated the aircraft:

== Operators ==
=== Australia ===
Royal Australian Air Force

- No. 451 Squadron RAAF - Three aircraft, for tropical trials.

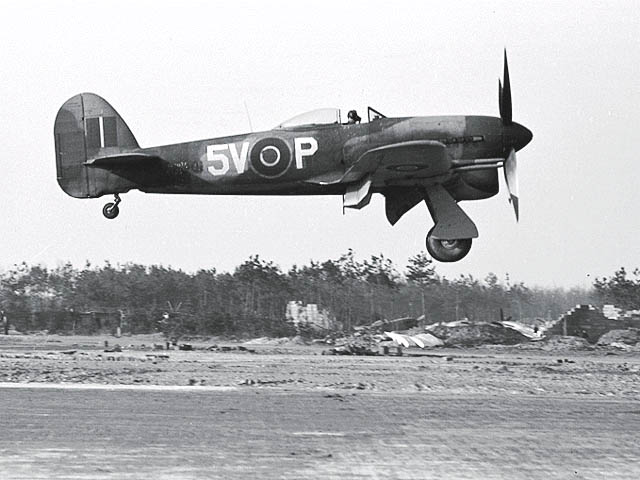
A Typhoon of 439 Sqn comes in for a landing

=== Canada ===
Royal Canadian Air Force

- No. 400 Squadron RCAF - Two aircraft for development work.
- No. 438 Squadron RCAF
- No. 439 Squadron RCAF
- No. 440 Squadron RCAF

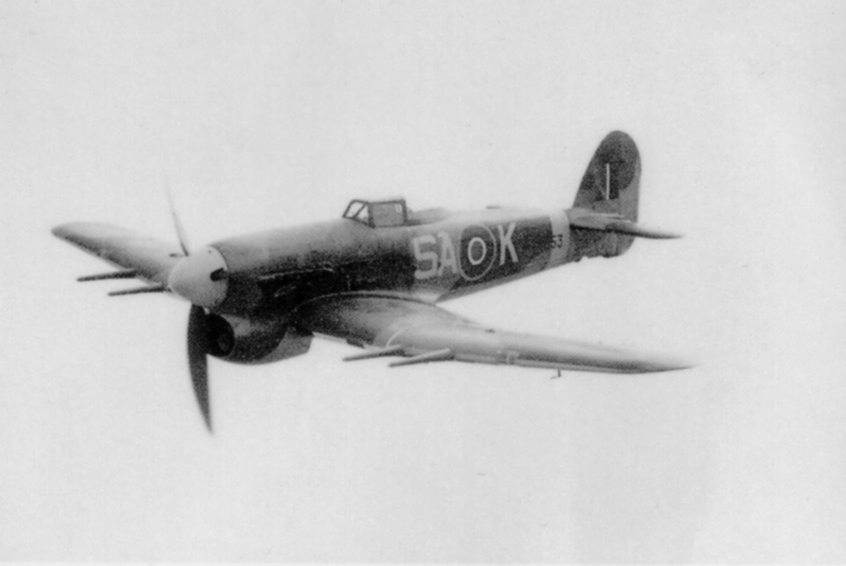
Typhoon of 486 Sqn flown by P/O Frank "Spud" Murphy.

=== New Zealand ===
- 485 (NZ) Squadron (Note: Article XV Squadrons - the RNZAF proper did not use Typhoons.)
- 486 (NZ) Squadron

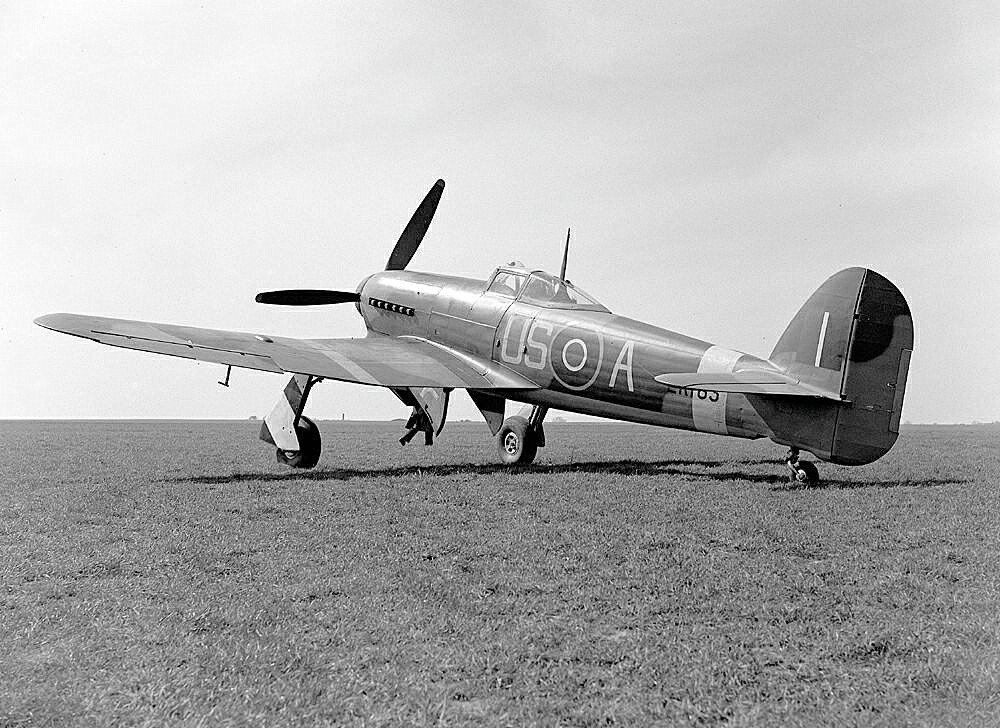
US-A, the mount of Squadron Leader Pheloung of 56 Sqn

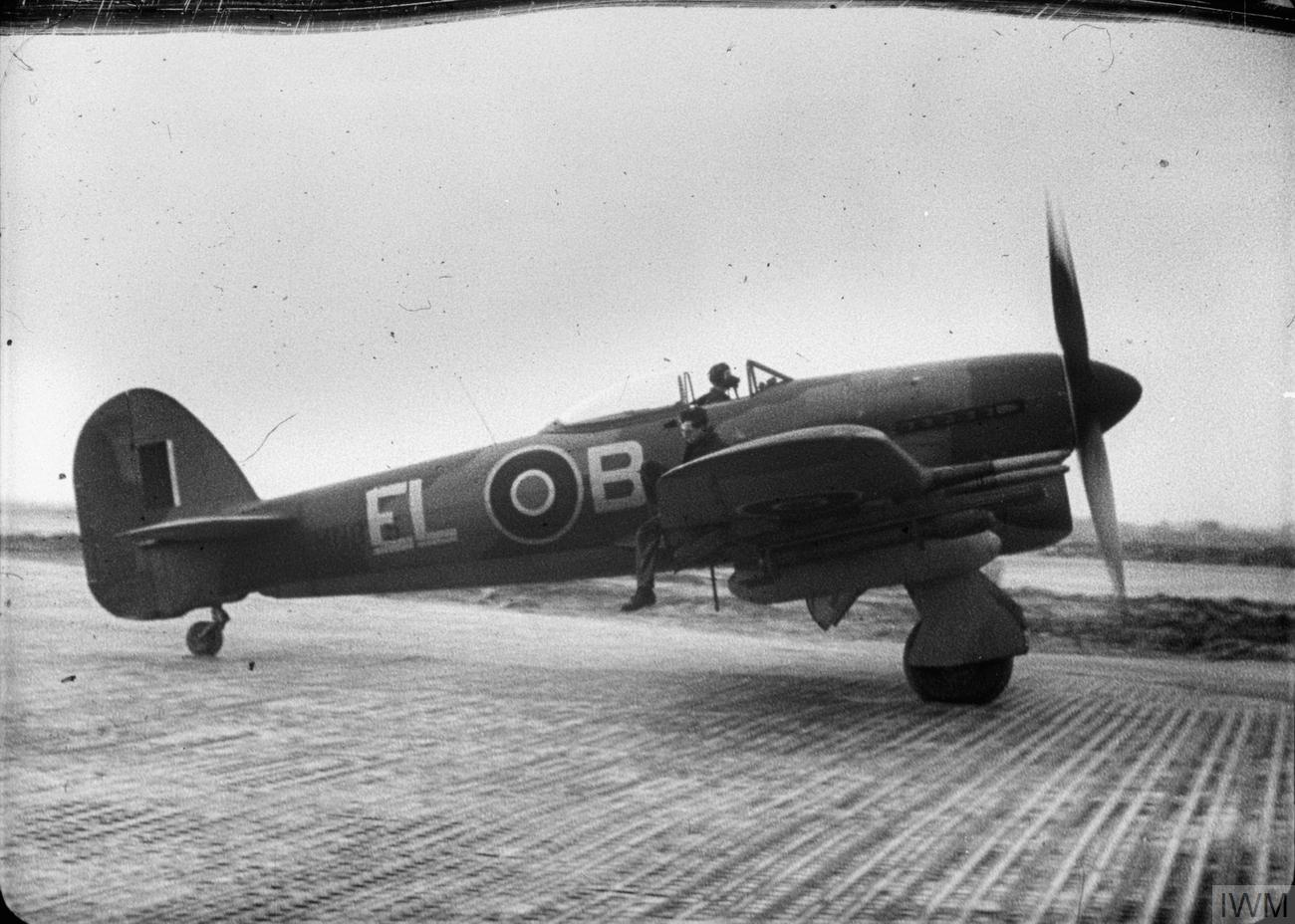
Hawker Typhoon Mk.Ib from 181 Sqn loaded with rocket projectiles and fuel tanks.

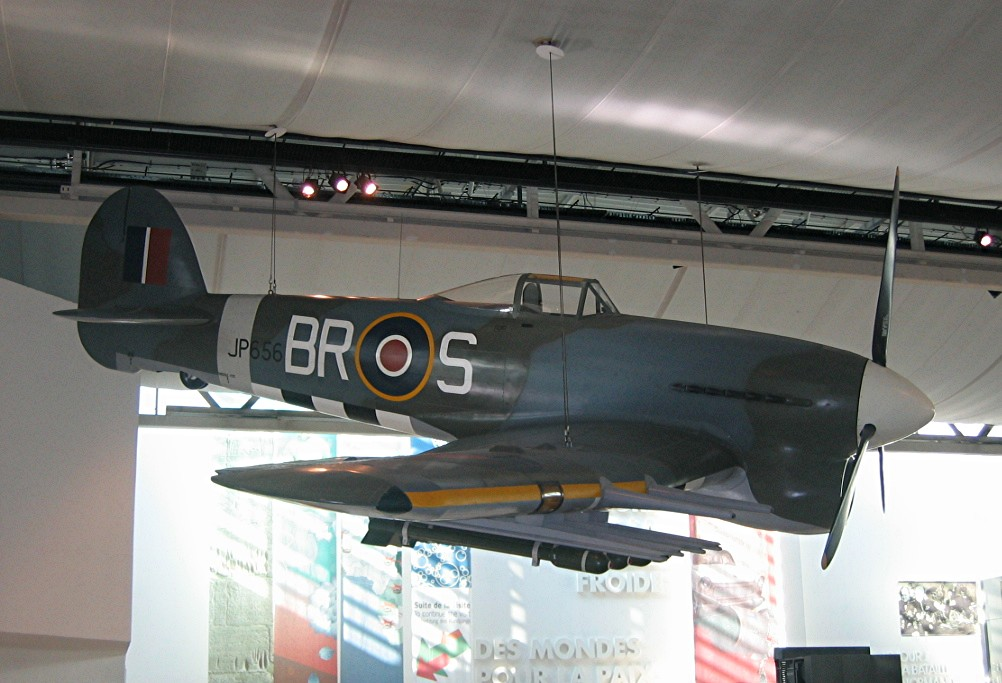
A replica in the Caen Museum in the markings of 184 Sqn

=== Pakistan ===
Pakistan Air Force

- No. 5 Squadron PAF - Sixteen aircraft.

=== United Kingdom ===
Royal Air Force

- 1 Squadron (July 1942 - April 1944)
- 3 Squadron (February 1943 - April 1944)
- 4 Squadron - Tactical Fighter Reconnaissance Unit, part of Second Tactical Air Force - used a small number of Fighter Reconnaissance (FR) Typhoons. (October 1944 - January 1945)
- 56 Squadron (September 1941 - May 1944)
- 137 Squadron (January 1944 - August 1945)
- 164 Squadron (January 1944 - May 1945)
- 168 Squadron (September 1944 - February 1945)
- 170 Squadron - Two aircraft for development work.
- 174 Squadron (April 1943 - September 1945)
- 175 Squadron (April 1943 - September 1945)
- 181 Squadron (September 1942 - September 1945)
- 182 Squadron (September 1942 - September 1945)
- 183 Squadron (November 1942 - January 1945)
- 184 Squadron (March 1944 - September 1945)
- 186 Squadron (November 1943 - February 1944)
- 193 Squadron (January 1943 - August 1945)
- 195 Squadron (November 1942 - February 1944)
- 197 Squadron (November 1942 - August 1945)
- 198 Squadron (December 1942 - September 1945)
- 245 Squadron (December 1942 - August 1945)
- 247 Squadron (January 1943 - August 1945)
- 257 Squadron (July 1942 - May 1945)
- 263 Squadron (December 1943 - August 1945)
- 266 Squadron (January 1942 - July 1945)
- 268 Squadron (July 1944 - October 1944) FR 1B
- 349 (Belgian) Squadron
- 350 (Belgian) Squadron - Three aircraft only.
- 534 Squadron
- 542 Squadron - One aircraft (MN315)
- 609 Squadron (April 1942 - September 1945)
- 1320 ('Abdullah') Flight (May - June 1944)

Fleet Air Arm

- 778 Naval Air Squadron

== See also ==
- Hawker Typhoon
- Hawker Tornado
- Hawker Tempest
