= RAF Merston =

Former RAF station in West Sussex

RAF Merston
- Chichester, West Sussex in England
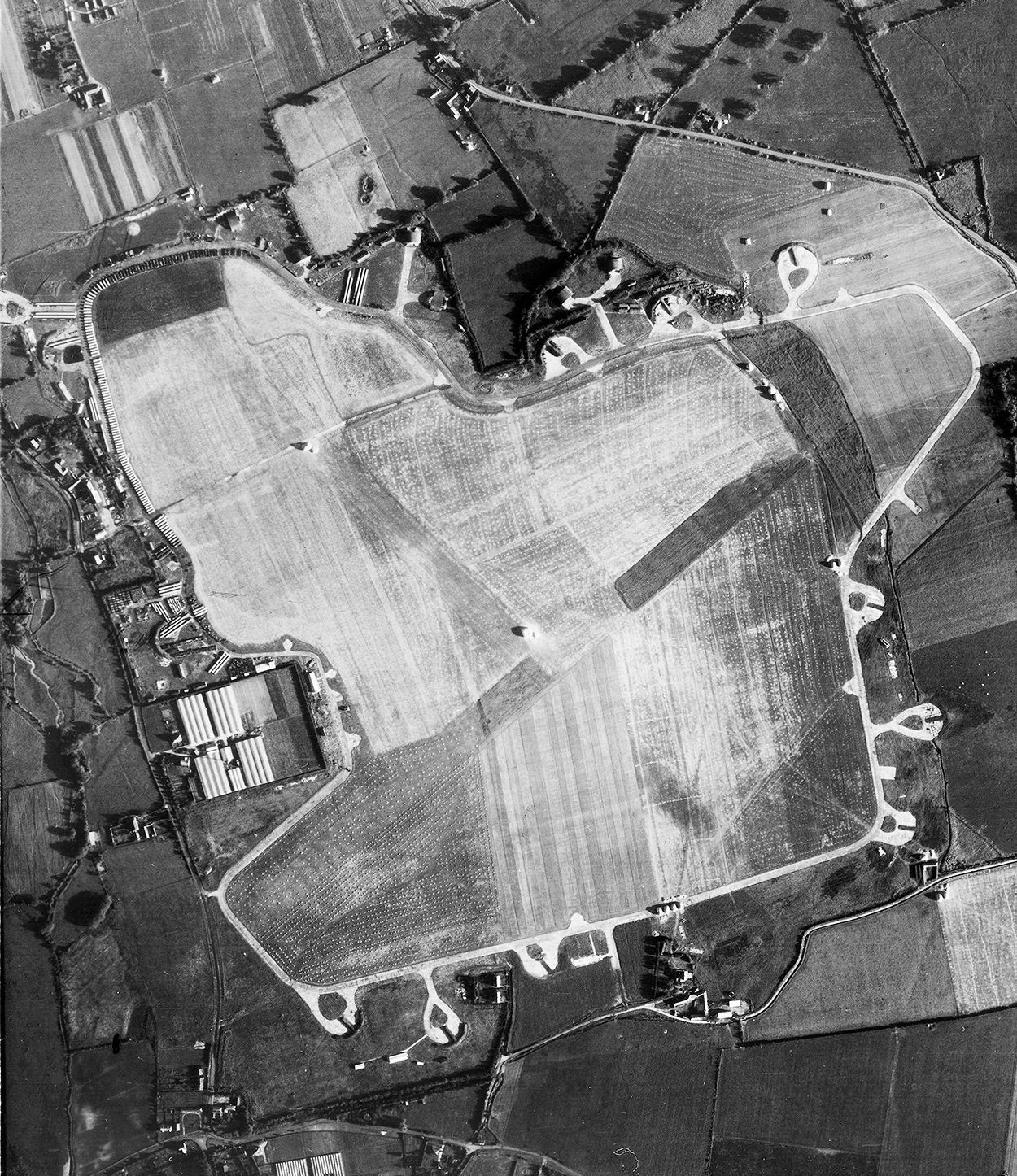
- Aerial photograph of RAF Merston on 21 September 1946

Site information
- Type: Royal Air Force Satellite Station
- Code: XM
- Owner: Air Ministry
- Operator: Royal Air Force; United States Army Air Forces
- Controlled by: RAF Fighter Command; 1941-42 & 1943-45 * No. 11 Group RAF

Location
- Shown within West Sussex
- Coordinates: 50.8203°N 0.7435°W

Site history
- Built: 1940/41
- In use: April 1941 - November 1945
- Battles/wars: European theatre of World War II

Airfield information
- Elevation: 50 feet (15 m) AMSL
Runways
Direction	Length and surface
00/00	Sommerfeld Tracking
00/00	Sommerfeld Tracking

Royal Air Force Merston or more simply RAF Merston is a former Royal Air Force satellite station located in West Sussex, England.

== History ==
RAF Merston was built In May 1941, as a grass airfield satellite to the neighbouring RAF Tangmere. The site was used by RAF fighter squadrons from May 1941 to August 1942. The site briefly closed for redevelopment in from August 1942 until its reopening in May 1943 as an RAF fighter station. It was used by the Royal Navy as a storage site for surplus war equipment until it closed on 13 November 1945.

== Units ==
The following squadrons were here at some point:

- No. 41 Squadron RAF (1941 & 1942)
- No. 80 Squadron RAF (1944)
- No. 118 Squadron RAF (1943)
- No. 130 (Punjab) Squadron RAF (1944)
- No. 131 (County of Kent) Squadron RAF (1942)
- No. 145 Squadron RAF (1941)
- No. 174 (Mauritius) Squadron RAF (1943)
- No. 181 Squadron RAF (1943 & 1944)
- No. 182 Squadron RAF (1943 & 1944)
- No. 184 Squadron RAF (1943)
- No. 229 Squadron RAF (1944)
- No. 232 Squadron RAF
- No. 247 (China-British) Squadron RAF (1943 & 1944)
- No. 274 Squadron RAF (1944)
- No. 303 Squadron RAF (1944)
- No. 329 (GC I/2 'Cicognes') Squadron RAF (1944)
- No. 340 (GC IV/2 Île-de-France) Squadron RAF (1944)
- No. 341 (G.C.III/2 'Alsace') Squadron RAF (1944)
- No. 402 Squadron RCAF (1943 & 1944)
- No. 412 Squadron RCAF (1942)
- No. 416 Squadron RCAF (1943)
- No. 485 Squadron RNZAF (1943)
- 307th Fighter Squadron

Units;

- No. 124 Airfield Headquarters RAF
- No. 145 (French) Airfield Headquarters RAF became No. 145 (French) (Fighter) Wing RAF
- No. 421 Repair & Salvage Unit
- No. 2701 Squadron RAF Regiment
- No. 2703 Squadron RAF Regiment
- No. 2720 Squadron RAF Regiment
- No. 2723 Squadron RAF Regiment
- No. 2742 Squadron RAF Regiment
- No. 2757 Squadron RAF Regiment
- No. 2761 Squadron RAF Regiment
- No. 2762 Squadron RAF Regiment
- No. 2765 Squadron RAF Regiment
- No. 2766 Squadron RAF Regiment
- No. 2767 Squadron RAF Regiment
- No. 2790 Squadron RAF Regiment
- No. 2795 Squadron RAF Regiment
- No. 2803 Squadron RAF Regiment
- No. 2813 Squadron RAF Regiment
- No. 2956 Squadron RAF Regiment
- No. 4001 Anti-Aircraft Flight RAF Regiment
- No. 4016 Anti-Aircraft Flight RAF Regiment
- Air Sea Rescue Flight RAF, Merston/Westhampnett (1941)
