= RAF Sawbridgeworth =

Former Royal Air Force station in England

RAF Sawbridgeworth
- Near Sawbridgeworth, Hertfordshire in England
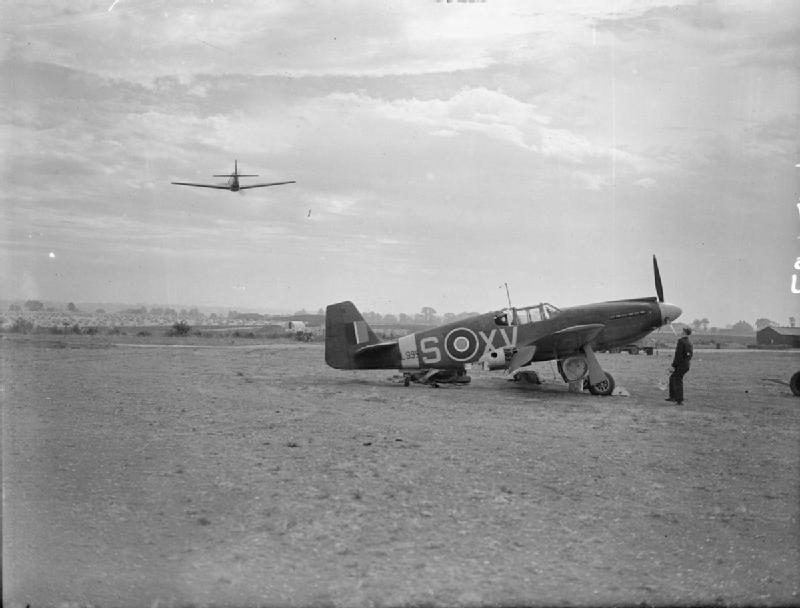
- Mustang aircraft at RAF Sawbridgeworth during WWII

Site information
- Type: Royal Air Force station
- Owner: Air Ministry
- Operator: Royal Air Force
- Controlled by: RAF Fighter Command

Location
- Shown within Hertfordshire RAF Sawbridgeworth (the United Kingdom)
- Coordinates: 51°50′26″N 000°06′59″E

Site history
- Built: 1916
- In use: 1916 - 1956
- Battles/wars: European theatre of World War II

Airfield information
- Elevation: 97 metres (318 ft) AMSL
Runways
Direction	Length and surface
01/19	1,234 metres (4,049 ft) Sommerfeld Tracking
06/24	1,280 metres (4,199 ft) Sommerfeld Tracking
13/31	1,585 metres (5,200 ft) Sommerfeld Tracking

Royal Air Force Sawbridgeworth or more simply RAF Sawbridgeworth is a former Royal Air Force station located 5.2 miles (8.4 km) north of Harlow, Essex and 14.4 miles (23.2 km) east of Stevenage, Hertfordshire, England.

The airfield was used during the First World War as a night landing ground for fighter aircraft of the Home Defence squadrons protecting London against attacks from German airships. During the inter-war period it was occasionally used for glider and civilian flying until 1937 when it became Mathams Wood Advanced Landing Ground (named after the nearby wooded area). In 1940 it was renamed RAF Sawbridgeworth after correspondence between the 2(AC) Squadron (and station) Commanding Officer Wing Commander A. J. W. Geddes and the Air Ministry in London. It ceased active operations in 1944 and, after a number of ground-based units operated from the site, was finally closed in mid-1946 and safeguarding relinquished by the RAF in May 1956.

== Station history ==
=== First World War ===
A large field west of Shingle Hall farm was used as an emergency night landing ground for No. 39 (Home Defence) Squadron which was based at RAF North Weald in Essex and, although little used, was in operation from April 1916 until November 1918.

=== Mid-wars ===
A short-lived civilian gliding club operated from the Shingle Hall site in 1928, and the British Hospitals Air Pageant visited what then became known locally as the Spellbrook Flying Ground on 17 May 1933 to give a flying display and passenger rides in their aircraft to the visiting public. Additionally, Army Co-operation squadrons of the RAF used another area of farmland near to Mathams Wood, a wooded area to the north of Blounts Farm, as a landing ground for 'resident' field training exercises in 1937.

=== Second World War ===
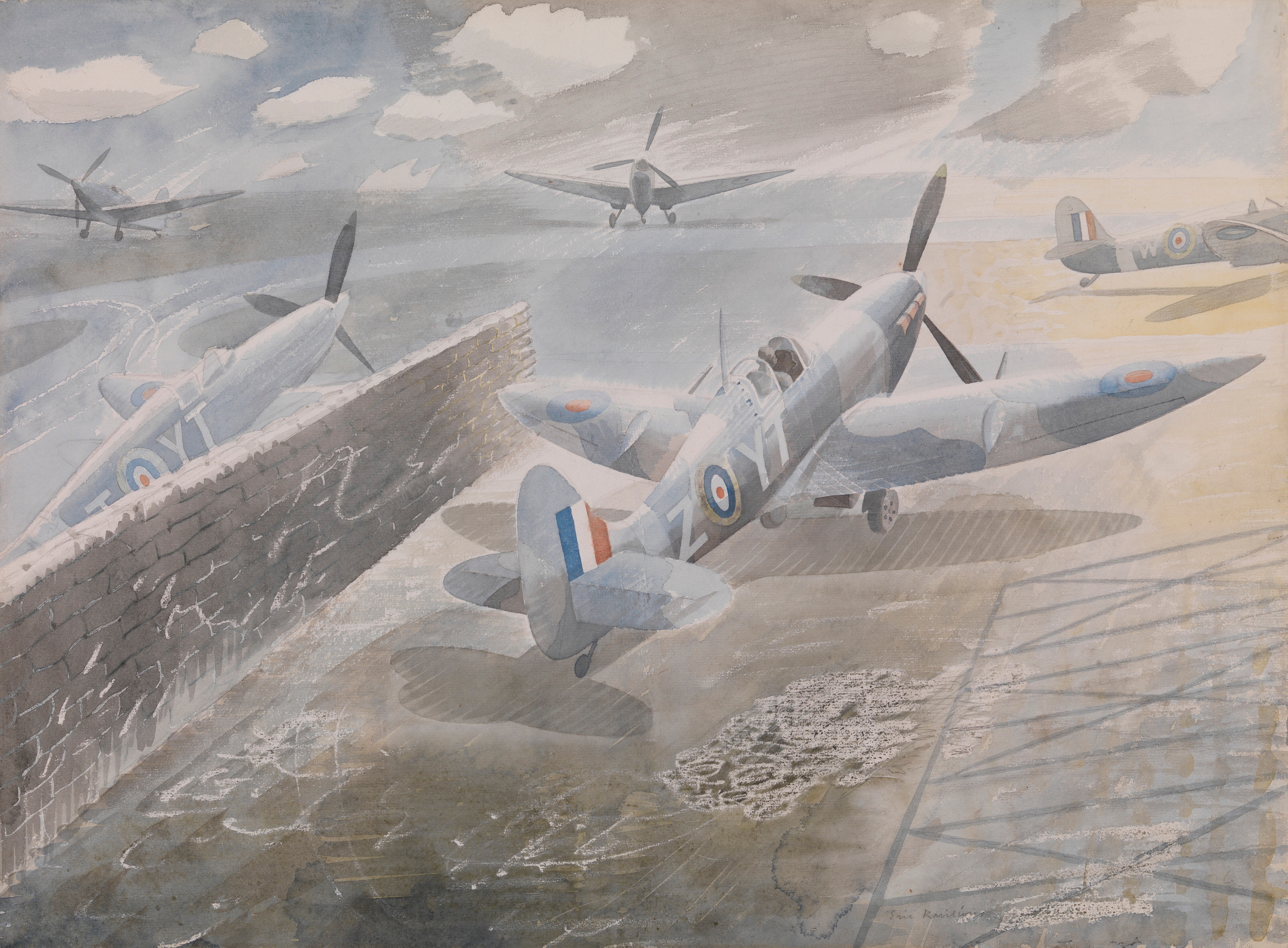
"Spitfires at Sawbridgeworth, Herts" by war artist Eric Ravilious (1942), shown in the colours of a unit that never flew Spitfires from the airfield

After the retreat from France in 1940 by the British Expeditionary Force the commanding officer of 2 (Army Cooperation) Squadron investigated the possibility of the squadron settling at Mathams Wood ALG as no base, permanent or otherwise, had been allocated to the squadron. Thus 2 (AC) Squadron was the unit that established the location for the Second World War airfield that eventually became designated RAF Sawbridgeworth. Apart from operating the Westland Lysander on its normal reconnaissance duties for the Army the squadron was also responsible for the initial selection and training of pilots to be used by the Special Operations Executive to insert agents into Occupied France. The majority of operations from Sawbridgeworth were photo-reconnaissance missions and generally linked to Army requests for battlefield coverage, but once equipped with the faster North American Mustang Mk 1 & 1a, and when the German V-weapon programme intensified, more and more sorties were flown against these targets and various radar installations prior to the Allied invasion of Occupied France. As well as 2 (AC) Squadron, who were based here between June 1940 and April 1944, with their Station Offices at Shingle Hall, many other squadrons operated from the airfield during the Second World War.

Squadron	Identification	Equipment	From	To	To
No. 2 Squadron RAF	KO, XV	Westland Lysander; Curtiss Tomahawk; North American Mustang I & IA	15 June 1940	4 April 1944	various
No. 4 Squadron RAF	NIL				
No. 16 Squadron RAF	UG				
No. 63 Squadron RAF	NIL	North American Mustang IA	12 November 1943	30 November 1943	RAF North Weald
No. 80 Squadron RAF	W2	Supermarine Spitfire VB	24 April 1944	5 May 1944	RAF Hornchurch
No. 126 (Persian Gulf) Squadron RAF	5J	Supermarine Spitfire VB; Supermarine Spitfire VC; Supermarine Spitfire IXB	30 April 1944; 30 April 1944; 30 April 1944	30 April 1944; 30 April 1944; 22 May 1944	RAF Culmhead
No. 168 Squadron RAF	NIL	North American Mustang IA	12 November 1943	30 November 1943	RAF North Weald
No. 170 Squadron RAF	NIL	North American Mustang IA	12 November 1943	15 January 1944	Disbanded
No. 182 Squadron RAF	XM	Hawker Typhoon IA/IB	7 December 1942; 20 January 1943	17 January 1943; 30 January 1943	RAF Snailwell; RAF Martlesham Heath
No. 231 Squadron RAF	NIL				
No. 239 Squadron RAF	NIL				
No. 241 Squadron RAF	NIL				
No. 268 Squadron RAF	NIL	North American Mustang IA	1 March 1944	26 March 1944	RAF Dundonald
No. 613 (City of Manchester) Squadron AAF	SY				
No. 652 Squadron RAF	NIL				
809 Naval Air Squadron	6B	Fairey Fulmar II	1 October 1942	11 October 1942	RAF Machrihanish

Units

- No. 3 Maintenance Unit RAF
- No. 1495 (Target Towing) Flight RAF
- No. 3 Casualty Air Evacuation Unit
- No. 3 Concealment and Decoy Unit
- No. 4 Casualty Air Evacuation Unit
- No. 14 Personnel Transit Centre
- No. 34 Wing Communication Unit
- No. 35 Reconnaissance Wing RAF
- No. 123 Airfield Headquarters RAF (1943-44)
- No. 130 Airfield Headquarters RAF (1944)
- No. 247 Maintenance Unit RAF
- No. 409 Repair & Salvage Unit
- No. 410 Repair & Salvage Unit
- No. 418 Air Stores Park
- No. 2759 Squadron RAF Regiment
- No. 2770 Squadron RAF Regiment
- No. 2809 Squadron RAF Regiment
- No. 3205 Servicing Commando
- No. 3226 Servicing Commando

== Current use ==
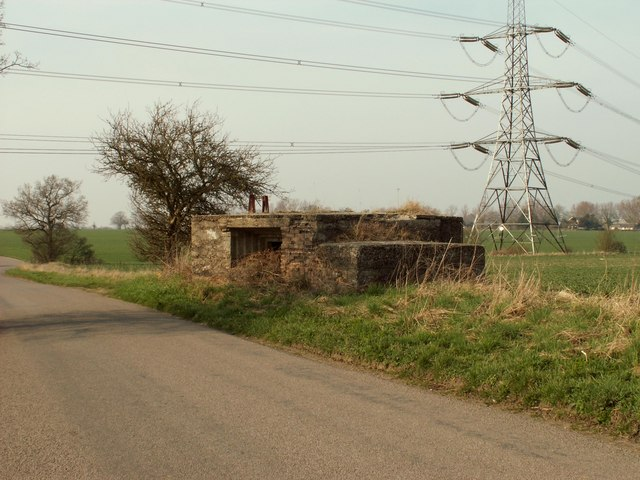
A pillbox near Allen's Green, a surviving part of the airfield's defensive perimeter.

Although cropspraying by air of the farm and other local fields was carried out by aircraft temporarily based on part of the remaining concrete perimeter track from 1959 until 1983 this was the only aerial activity carried out postwar from the airfield. A number of pill boxes and personnel shelters are the only indication that there used to be anything here to do with the military. The control tower was demolished in 1953 and the Sommerfeld tracking reinforcement to the grass runways taken up to allow the land to be farmed again. Over a period of time the sole 'T2' and the 'Blister' hangars were removed, the last surviving Blister being blown down in the October 1987 gales (this was the hangar that Harry Roberts, a criminal who with two others murdered three police officers near Wormwood Scrubs prison in August 1966, was found hiding in after a 96-day manhunt - the longest in police history). Modern aerial shots of the airfield show the 'ghost' outlines of the reinforced grass runways, similar to what can be seen at nearby RAF Hunsdon and RAF Matching, albeit they had 'hard' surfacing. The most visible indication of the extent of the airfield is the concrete perimeter track that is still visible for about 85% of its original length.

In outlying areas to the main airfield site some of the airfield buildings still exist, such as the Sick Quarters Site that has become a small industrial estate. Other buildings have been absorbed into the land-owning farm to become agricultural buildings; whilst the Gymnasium from the Communal Site was moved into Sawbridgeworth town post-war, where it is now the town's Memorial Hall.

At the instigation of the Hertfordshire Airfield Memorials Group, who are keen to record aviation history throughout the county, a memorial to the wartime use of the airfield was erected and dedicated on 14 May 2006 at the original Shingle Hall entrance to the airfield.

== See also ==
- List of former Royal Air Force stations
