= List of Hawker Tempest operators =

The List of Hawker Tempest operators lists the counties and their air force units that have operated the aircraft:

== Operators ==
=== Canada ===
Royal Canadian Air Force

Only one Hawker Tempest was ever operated by the RCAF. The aircraft was in service from 1946 to 1947.

=== Nazi Germany ===
One Mk.5 (EJ709) was salvaged by 2./Versuchsverband O.K.L. after getting shot down in October 1944 and ferried to Finow for repairs. It was repaired with parts of another Tempest which was shot down at Thiene near Hesepe on 29 December 1944.

=== India ===
Indian Air Force

- No. 1 Squadron, Indian Air Force
- No. 3 Squadron, Indian Air Force
- No. 4 Squadron, Indian Air Force
- No. 7 Squadron, Indian Air Force
- No. 8 Squadron, Indian Air Force
- No. 9 Squadron, Indian Air Force
- No. 10 Squadron, Indian Air Force

=== New Zealand ===
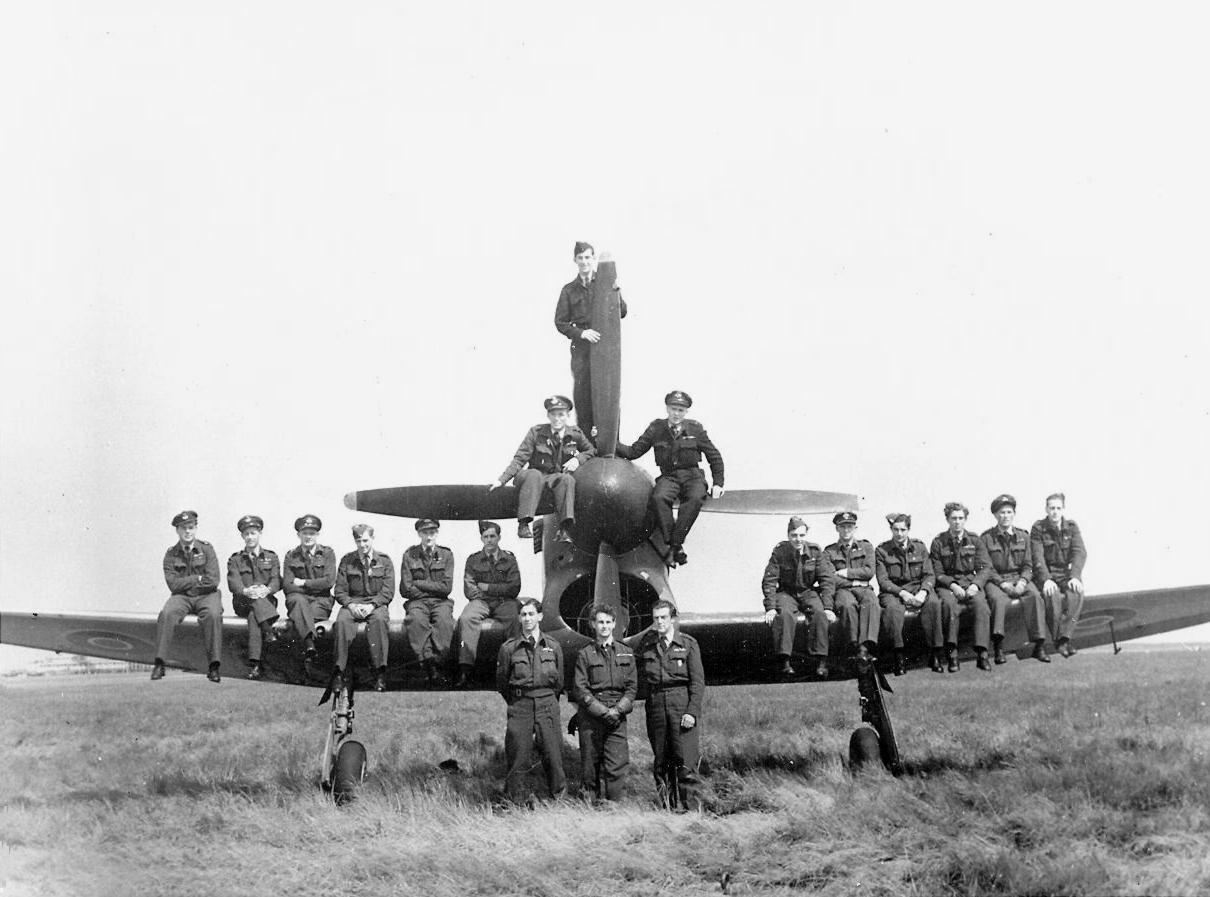
486 (NZ) Squadron at Volkel, the Netherlands in 1945

Royal New Zealand Air Force

- No. 486 Squadron RNZAF

=== Pakistan ===
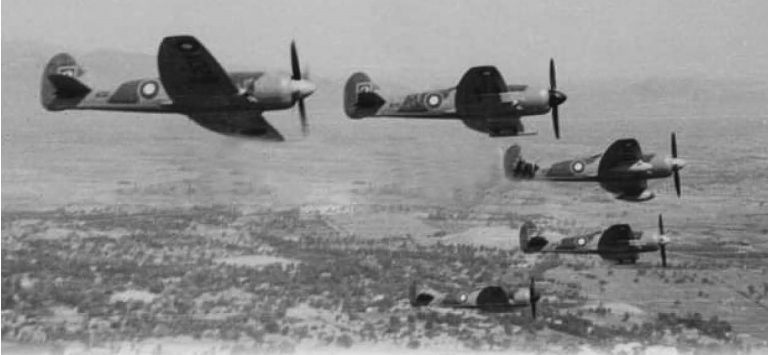
Pakistani Hawker Tempest Mk-II in formation.

Royal Pakistan Air Force

- No. 5 Squadron Falcons
- No. 9 Squadron Griffins
- No. 14 Squadron Tail Choppers

Inherited 16 Tempest Mk.IIs from the British Indian Air Force instead of the original 35 fighters in 1947.

=== United Kingdom ===
Royal Air Force

- No. 3 Squadron RAF
- No. 5 Squadron RAF
- No. 6 Squadron RAF
- No. 8 Squadron RAF
- No. 16 Squadron RAF
- No. 20 Squadron RAF
- No. 23 Squadron RAF
- No. 26 Squadron RAF
- No. 30 Squadron RAF
- No. 33 Squadron RAF
- No. 39 Squadron RAF
- No. 54 Squadron RAF
- No. 56 Squadron RAF
- No. 80 Squadron RAF
- No. 152 Squadron RAF
- No. 174 Squadron RAF
- No. 181 Squadron RAF
- No. 182 Squadron RAF
- No. 183 Squadron RAF
- No. 213 Squadron RAF
- No. 222 Squadron RAF
- No. 247 Squadron RAF
- No. 249 Squadron RAF
- No. 266 Squadron RAF
- No. 274 Squadron RAF
- No. 287 Squadron RAF
- No. 349 Squadron RAF
- No. 501 Squadron RAF

== See also ==
- Hawker Tempest
