= Lüneburg Airfield =

Lüneburg Airfield B 156/Lüneburg
- IATA: none; ICAO: none

Summary
- Location: Lüneburg, Lower Saxony, Germany
- Interactive map of Lüneburg Airfield; B 156/Lüneburg

Special landing field Lüneburg (ICAO airport code EDHG) is an airfield near Lüneburg in Lower Saxony state, Germany. It is approved for motor planes, motor glider, microlights and gliders up to a maximum weight of 2000 kg. Helicopters are approved up to a weight of 5700 kg and balloon rides can be undertaken from the airfield. It serves the Lüneburg region as a popular destination for families as well as for external private pilots and Lüneburg business people. The airfield thus fulfils an important task as an infrastructural hub and for club life in the Lüneburg Heath region.

History

Before civilian use, today's airfield was an airfield of the Wehrmacht Luftwaffe, before and during the Second World War. At least 14 major active flying gruppes and geschwaders (without school and supplementary units) were stationed here between 1938 and 1945, including Kampfgeschwader 4 and Kampfgeschwader 100.

On 18 April 1944, during an air raid on Lüneburg, the Lüneburg Air Base was bombed by about thirty aircraft and was extensively damaged. In the spring of 1945 the airfield was captured by British forces, and given the Advanced Landing Ground code B 156. Amongst RAF squadrons which have used the airfield are Nos 3, 107, 137, 181, 182 and 247. Both Numbers 400 and No. 414 Squadron RCAF were disbanded here on 7 August 1945. No. 430 Squadron RCAF was also disbanded here the same month. All three RCAF squadrons were part of 39 (Reconnaissance) Wing, which is reported to have disbanded at Lüneburg itself on 2 August 1945.

After the war ended, the airfield came under the control of the British Air Forces of Occupation; No. 652 Squadron RAF was based here from 1 December 1947 to 1 May 1949. Upgrading work took place in connection with the Berlin Airlift in the second half of 1949. No. 46 Group RAF disbanded here in October 1949.

No. 54 Squadron RAF Regiment, a ground defence squadron, was located at Lüneburg in the later half of 1951, but then was moved to RAF Gatow in early 1952.
