= No. 34 Expeditionary Air Wing =

No. 34 Expeditionary Air Wing Previous units: 34th (Training) Wing RFC No. 34 (Army Co-operation) Wing RAF No. 34 Strategic Reconnaissance Wing RAF No. 34 Reconnaissance Wing RAF No. 34 Expeditionary Air Wing (ISTAR) RAF
- Active: 1 April 2006 - 1917-18; 1941-43; 1943-45; 1953-60
- Country: United Kingdom
- Branch: Royal Air Force; Royal Flying Corps
- Type: Expeditionary Air Wing
- Role: ISTAR
- Size: Wing
- Garrison/HQ: RAF Waddington

No. 34 Expeditionary Air Wing is a deployable Expeditionary Air Wing of the Royal Air Force based at RAF Waddington, Lincolnshire, England, UK.

The current wing was established on 1 April 2006 the unit has history dating back to September 1917.

== History ==
=== First World War ===
34th (Training) Wing RFC was formed on 8 September 1917 at Stockbridge within the Southern Training Brigade. It controlled Chattis Hill Aerodrome and Lopcombe Corner Aerodrome until 12 October 1918 when it was disbanded.

=== Second World War ===
No. 34 (Army Co-operation) Wing RAF was formed on 22 August 1941 for Army Eastern Command attached to Eastern Command HQ at Luton Hoo under RAF Army Cooperation Command controlling Army co-operations units based at RAF Bottisham, RAF Sawbridgeworth, RAF Snailwell, RAF Stapleford Tawney, RAF Twinwood Farm and RAF Westley. It was renamed to No. 34 Strategic Reconnaissance Wing RAF on 1 June 1943 with No. 12 Group RAF, RAF Fighter Command attached to the RAF Second Tactical Air Force. On 30 June 1943 the wing moved to RAF Blackbushe, then to RAF Northolt on 8 April 1944, on 1 September 1944 the wing moved to mainland Europe and used A.12 Balleroy, B.47 Amiens and Eindhoven before being disbanded on 30 September 1945.

It controlled various squadrons including: 2, 4, 16, 69, 140, 168, 170, 182, 231, 239, 241, 268, 309, 613, 652, 654, 656, 657.

==== D-Day ====
For Operation Overlord, the Allied invasion of Normandy in June 1944, No. 34 was a reconnaissance wing in RAF Second Tactical Air Force at RAF Northolt with Nos 16 (Spitfire PRXI), 69 (Wellington XIII) and 140 (Mosquito PRIX/XVI) Squadrons;

==== Operation Bodenplatte ====
No. 34 Wing was based at B.56 Brussels-Melsbroek during Operation Bodenplatte, the German aerial attack of 1 January 1945. The Germans hit Melsbroek hard. According to Emil Clade (leading III./JG 27), the anti-aircraft gun positions were not manned, and aircraft were bunched together or in lines, which made perfect targets. The attack caused considerable damage among the units based there and was a great success. The reconnaissance wings lost two entire squadrons worth of machines. No. 69 Squadron RAF lost 11 Vickers Wellingtons and two damaged. Possibly all No. 140 Squadron RAF′s de Havilland Mosquitoes were lost. At least five Supermarine Spitfires from No. 16 Squadron RAF were destroyed. No. 271 Squadron RAF lost at least seven Handley Page Harrow transports "out of action". A further 15 other aircraft were destroyed. 139 Wing reported five North American B-25 Mitchells destroyed and five damaged. Another source states that 13 Wellingtons were destroyed, as were five Mosquitoes, four Austers and five Avro Ansons from the Tactical Air Forces 2nd Communications Squadron. Three Spitfires were also lost and two damaged.

=== Cold War ===
After the Second World War 34 Wing was reformed as No. 34 Reconnaissance Wing RAF at RAF Gutersloh as part of No. 2 Group RAF as part of RAF Second Tactical Air Force in West Germany. The unit moved to RAF Laarbruch on 1 November 1954, it was disbanded on 1 January 1960.

It controlled various squadrons such as: 79, 541, 69, 31, 314, 68, 16 and 5.

== Current use ==
The unit was reformed on 1 April 2006 as an Expeditionary Air Wing and is based at RAF Waddington.

== See also ==
- List of Wings of the Royal Air Force
