= Andrew James Wray Geddes =

Royal Air Force officer (1906-1988)

- Born: 31 July 1906; Belgaum, India
- Died: 15 December 1988 (aged 82); Eastbourne, Sussex, England
- Military career
- Allegiance: United Kingdom
- Branch: British Army; Royal Air Force
- Service years: 1926–1954
- Rank: Air Commodore
- Service number: 25011
- Commands: No. 2 Squadron RAF; No 4 Flight Training School
- Conflicts: Second World War
- Awards: Commander of the Order of the British Empire; Distinguished Service Order; Mentioned in Despatches (2); Commander of the Legion of Merit (United States)

Air Commodore Andrew James Wray Geddes, CBE, DSO (31 July 1906 – 15 December 1988) was the senior Royal Air Force officer during the Second World War who led the planning for Operation Manna, the air drop of food supplies to the starving population of the Netherlands.

== Early life ==
Geddes was born in Belgaum, India, the son of Major Malcolm Henry Burdett Geddes, an Indian Army officer. He soon returned to England with his mother and much later graduated from the Royal Military Academy in Woolwich and joined the Royal Artillery in 1926.

== Military career ==
Geddes began his military career in the British Army before being seconded to the Royal Air Force (RAF) in 1928. He trained at RAF Sealand before joining No. 4 Squadron RAF at RAF Farnborough flying the Bristol F.2 Fighter and later the Armstrong Whitworth Atlas.

In 1932, Geddes rejoined the Royal Artillery but was again seconded to the RAF in 1935, this time as a Flight Commander with No. 2 Squadron RAF at RAF Manston. By 1938, Geddes was the squadron commander.

=== Second World War ===
Geddes spent all of the Second World War attached to the RAF, although retained his army commission, in the Royal Artillery. (He relinquished his army commission in 1946, with effect from 1 September 1945.)

In 1939–1942, Geddes was commanding officer of No. 2 Squadron RAF, an army co-operation unit. He was appointed an Officer of the Order of the British Empire in the 1941 New Year Honours. In 1942, Geddes was appointed commander of No. 35 Wing RAF and to the headquarters staff of RAF Army Cooperation Command.

Promoted to the substantiative rank of major on 3 February 1943, Geddes was in charge of operations and planning for Second Tactical Air Force, from 1 April 1943 until VE Day. The RAF made him an acting air commodore on 1 June 1943, and he was awarded the Distinguished Service Order in June 1943.

Geddes had an active role in the planning of Operation Overlord, the Allied invasion of Normandy in June 1944. Shortly after the landing on 6 June 1944, Geddes flew a photoreconnaissance Mustang over the invasion beaches, taking some of the first pictures of the invasion. He was Mentioned in Despatches on 1 January 1945.

In early 1945, Geddes was responsible for the organising of Operations Manna and Chowhound; the dropping of food and other essentials to the starving Dutch population still in the occupied areas of the Netherlands. The first food drops began on 29 April 1945, even though no formal treaty had been signed between the Allies and Germans. That day over 240 Lancasters flew at low level to drop 535 tons of food at six designated places in the west of the Netherlands agreed with Germans. In case the Allies were trying to use the drop for military purposes (for example dropping paratroopers or arms for partisans), the Germans sent anti-aircraft guns to four of the locations. Local Dutch organising committees then set up a plan to collect the air drops and distribute the food.

Geddes was again Mentioned in Despatches, on 14 June 1945, granted a Commander of the United States Legion of Merit in October 1945, and advanced to Commander of the Order of the British Empire in the 1946 New Year Honours.

== Post military career ==
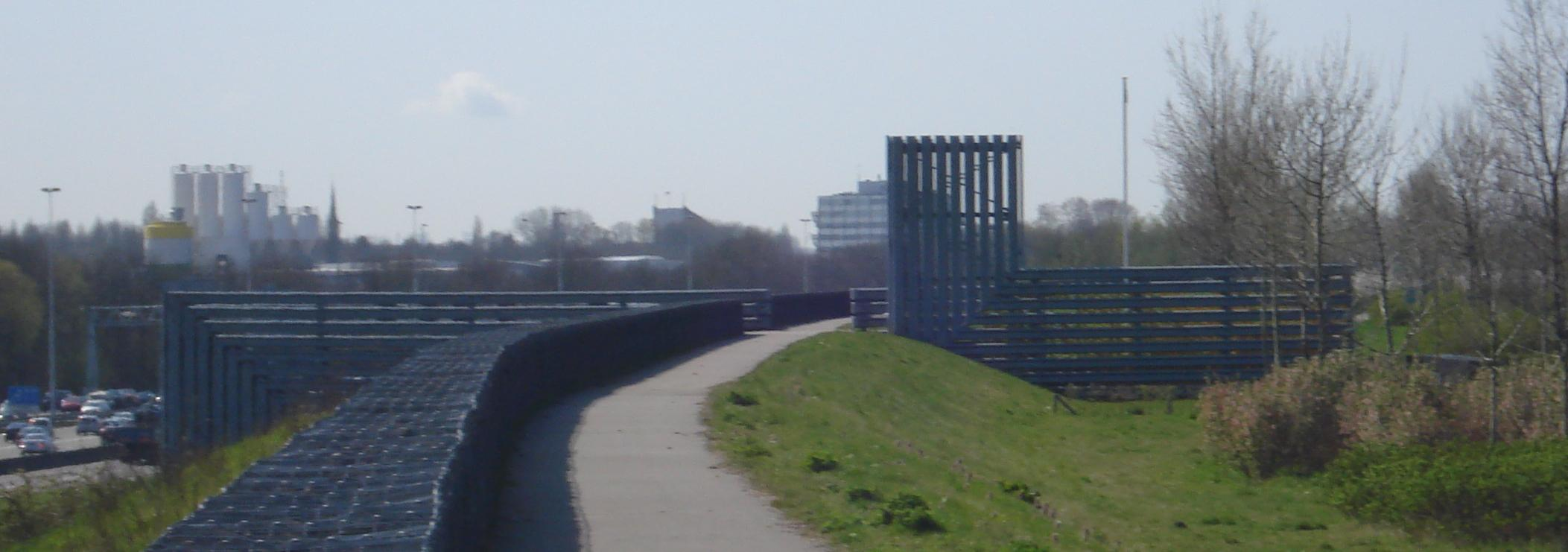
Operation Manna monument on the Air Commodore Geddespath in Rotterdam

Geddes retired from the RAF on 29 September 1954 with the rank of air commodore and worked in local government.

The road "Air Commodore Geddespad" in Rotterdam was named after him.
