= RAF Army Cooperation Command =

Former command of the Royal Air Force

RAF Army Co-operation Command
- Active: 1940–1943
- Country: United Kingdom
- Branch: Royal Air Force
- Type: Command
- Role: Cooperation with the British Army
- Engagements: Second World War

Commanders
- Commander: Air Marshal Sir Arthur Barratt

The RAF Army Co-operation Command was a short-lived command of the Royal Air Force during the Second World War, comprising the army cooperation units of the RAF.

The command was formed on 1 December 1940 when No. 22 (Army Co-Operation) Group, previously a part of Fighter Command, was raised to command status. Initially it controlled two groups: No. 70 Group RAF for training and No. 71 Group RAF for operations. In August 1941, 71 Group re-organized its squadrons into a Wing basis. Each wing was directly attached to a UK based Army regional Command.

Its function was to act as the focus for activities connected with the interaction of the British Army and the RAF, such as close air support, tactical reconnaissance, artillery spotting and training of anti-aircraft defences. It was also responsible for developing tactics for the invasion of Europe, where direct air support proved to be decisive.

Army Co-Operation Command proved to be controversial, with the Chief of the Imperial General Staff General Sir Alan Brooke being an implacable foe of the command arrangement. It was disbanded on 31 March 1943, when most of its units were used to form the Second Tactical Air Force.

The command had only had one commander during its short existence, Air Marshal Sir Arthur Barratt.

== Army Co-operation Command (April 1942) ==
No. 70 (Army Co-operation Training) Group – 1 December 1940 – 1 June 1943 (transferred to ADGB)

- No. 41 OTU – Lysander / Tomahawk – RAF Old Sarum
- No. 42 OTU – Various Aircraft – RAF Andover
- No. 271 Squadron RAF – Albatross / Dominie – RAF Doncaster
- No. 651 Squadron RAF – Taylorcraft I – RAF Old Sarum
- Various other flights and minor training units.

Wings

- No. 32 Wing – Scottish Command – Edinburgh
  - No. 309 (Polish) Squadron RAF – Lysander – RAF Dunino
  - No. 614 Squadron RAF – Blenheim – RAF Macmerry
- No. 33 Wing – Northern Command – York
  - No. 613 Squadron RAF – Tomahawk I/II – RAF Doncaster
  - No. 4 Squadron RAF – Tomahawk I/II – RAF York
- No. 34 Wing – Eastern Command – Luton
  - No. 140 Squadron RAF – Spitfire PR.I – RAF Benson
  - No. 241 Squadron RAF – Tomahawk I/II – RAF Bottisham
  - No. 2 Squadron RAF – Tomahawk I/II RAF Sawbridgeworth
  - No. 268 Squadron RAF – Tomahawk I/II – RAF Snailwell
- No. 35 Wing – South Eastern Command – Reigate
  - No. 26 Squadron RAF – Tomahawk I/II – RAF Gatwick
  - No. 239 Squadron RAF – Tomahawk I/II – RAF Gatwick
  - No. 400 Squadron RCAF – Tomahawk I/II – RAF Odiham
  - No. 414 Squadron RCAF – Tomahawk I/II – RAF Croydon
- No. 36 Wing – South Western Command – Salisbury
  - No. 16 Squadron RAF – Tomahawk I/II – RAF Weston Zoyland
  - 1492 TTF – Lysander – RAF Weston Zoyland
  - No. 225 Squadron RAF – Lysander – RAF Thruxton
  - No. 13 Squadron RAF – Blenheim – RAF Odiham
- No. 37 Wing – Western Command – Chester
  - No active squadrons assigned.
- No 38 Wing – Airborne Division – RAF Netheravon
  - No. 296 Squadron RAF – Hart/Hector – RAF Netheravon
  - No. 297 Squadron RAF – Whitley – RAF Netheravon
- RAF Northern Ireland – Belfast
  - No. 231 Squadron RAF – Tomahawk I/II – RAF Maghaberry
  - 1494 TTF – Lysander/Tomahawk – RAF Long Kesh

== See also ==
- List of Royal Air Force commands
