= Snailwell =

Village in Cambridgeshire, England

Coordinates: 52.2811°N 0.4102°E

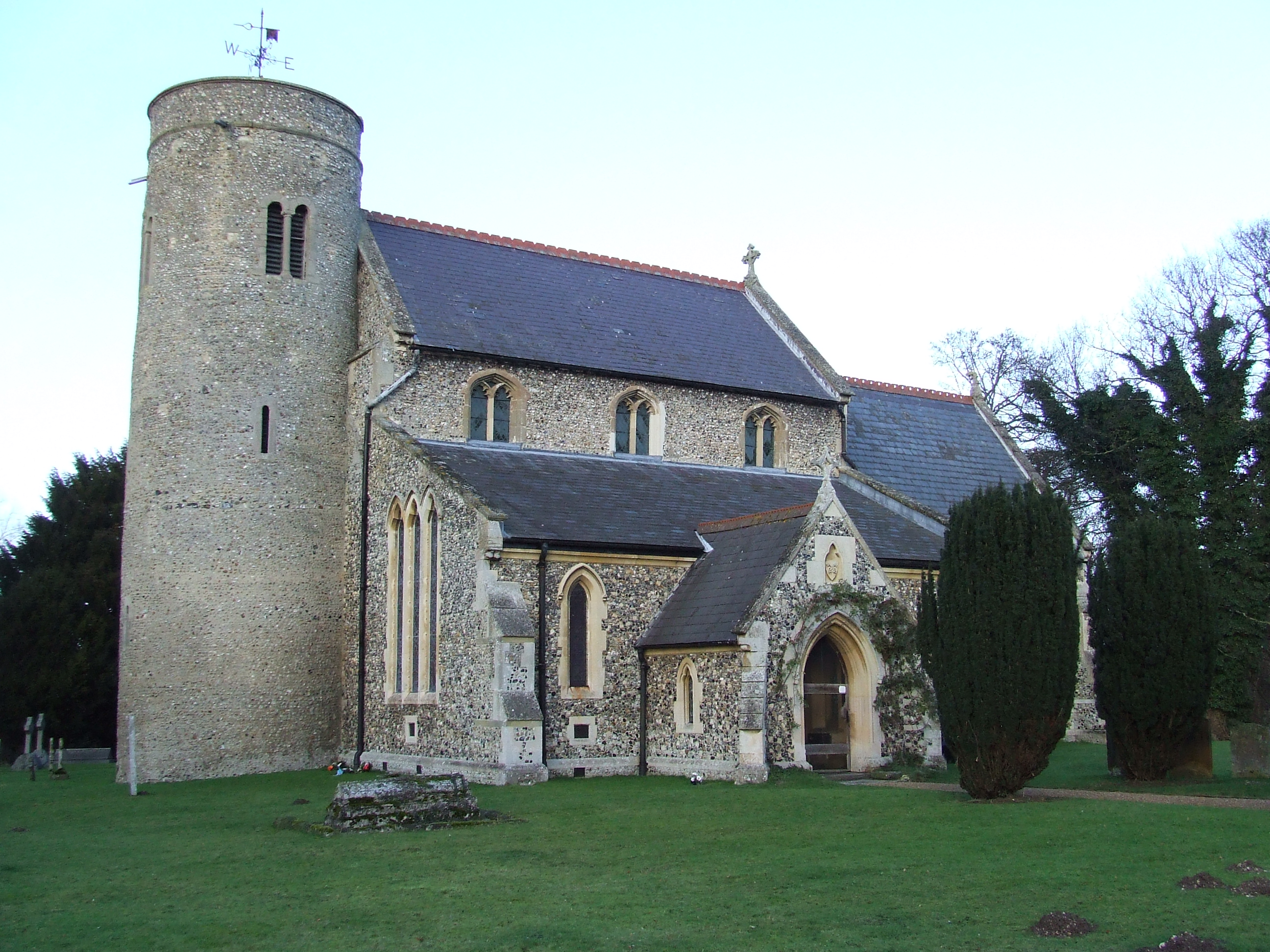
- The church of St Peter

- Location within Cambridgeshire
- Population: 224 (2001); 186 (2011)
- OS grid reference: TL6467
- District: East Cambridgeshire
- Shire county: Cambridgeshire
- Region: East
- Country: England
- Sovereign state: United Kingdom
- Post town: Newmarket
- Postcode district: CB8
- Dialling code: 01638
- Police: Cambridgeshire
- Fire: Cambridgeshire
- Ambulance: East of England

Snailwell is a small village and civil parish in East Cambridgeshire, England around 4 kilometres (2.5 mi) north of Newmarket.

== History ==
The parish of Snailwell covers an area of 2,034 acres (823 ha) in the extension of eastern Cambridgeshire that surrounds the town of Newmarket in Suffolk. The western and southern boundaries also form the border between Cambridgeshire and Suffolk, with the southern boundary following the line of the ancient Icknield Way (now the B1506). The northern boundary with Fordham follows the River Snail that rises in the parish, and the eastern boundary with Chippenham follows field boundaries.

The parish has been occupied since at least the Bronze Age when woodland was cleared. Ten tumuli, discovered in 1879, were situated alongside the Icknield Way but were flattened in 1941 when preparing space for a wartime airfield. RAF Snailwell was open from 1941 until 1946 just north of the railway line towards Bury St Edmunds and housed primarily American Air Force personnel with contingents from the R.A.F., 302 Polish squadron and the Royal Belgian Air Force. Sections of the concrete track and air-raid shelters can still be seen.

Due to its proximity to Newmarket, the village has been heavily involved in the breeding and training of horses since the Jockey Club of Newmarket bought 421 acres (170 ha) in the village for training in around 1882. In around 1900 Snailwell Stud was founded to the south-west of the village and grew to one of the most renowned in the country. Its most famous stallion was Chamossaire (1943–65), and in 1965 a life-size bronze statue of the horse was made by John Skeating to stand where the Newmarket Road reaches the village. Around a third of the land in the parish is now involved in the horse-racing industry.

Listed as Sneillewelle in around 1050, and Snelleuuelle in the Domesday Book of 1086, the village's name means "spring or stream infested with snails" or perhaps "sluggish stream". The spring in question may well be that in the north west of the parish that is the source of the River Snail.

== Church ==
There has been a church in Snailwell since at least the 11th century and the present parish church dates from this period. Now dedicated to St Peter, it was dedicated to St Andrew in the 13th century. The current building consists of a clerestoried nave with north and south aisles, chancel and a circular west tower, one of only two round-tower churches in Cambridgeshire (the other being in Bartlow). The tower is the oldest part of the church and was built in the 11th century. It had a lead spire until the mid-19th century. The chancel dates from the 13th century.

The church had fallen into disrepair by 1820 and attendance fell. In 1878 a new rector immediately closed the church in order to perform extensive renovation.

The 17th-century lawyer Sir Isaac Thornton is buried in the church, as is Sir Arthur Clarke (1715-1806), the last of the baronets of Snailwell.

== Village life ==
A pub has been recorded in Snailwell since at least 1670. The village's only remaining pub, The George and Dragon, opened before 1834, moving to its present site in 1842.

An annual fair, the Snailwell Medieval Fayre, is held each May in the village, though none was held in 2011.

The village school closed in 1933; the building served as the village hall until 1976, when it became a private house.
