= RAF Snailwell =

Former RAF station in Cambridgeshire, England

RAF Snailwell USAAF Station 361
- Near Snailwell, Cambridgeshire in England
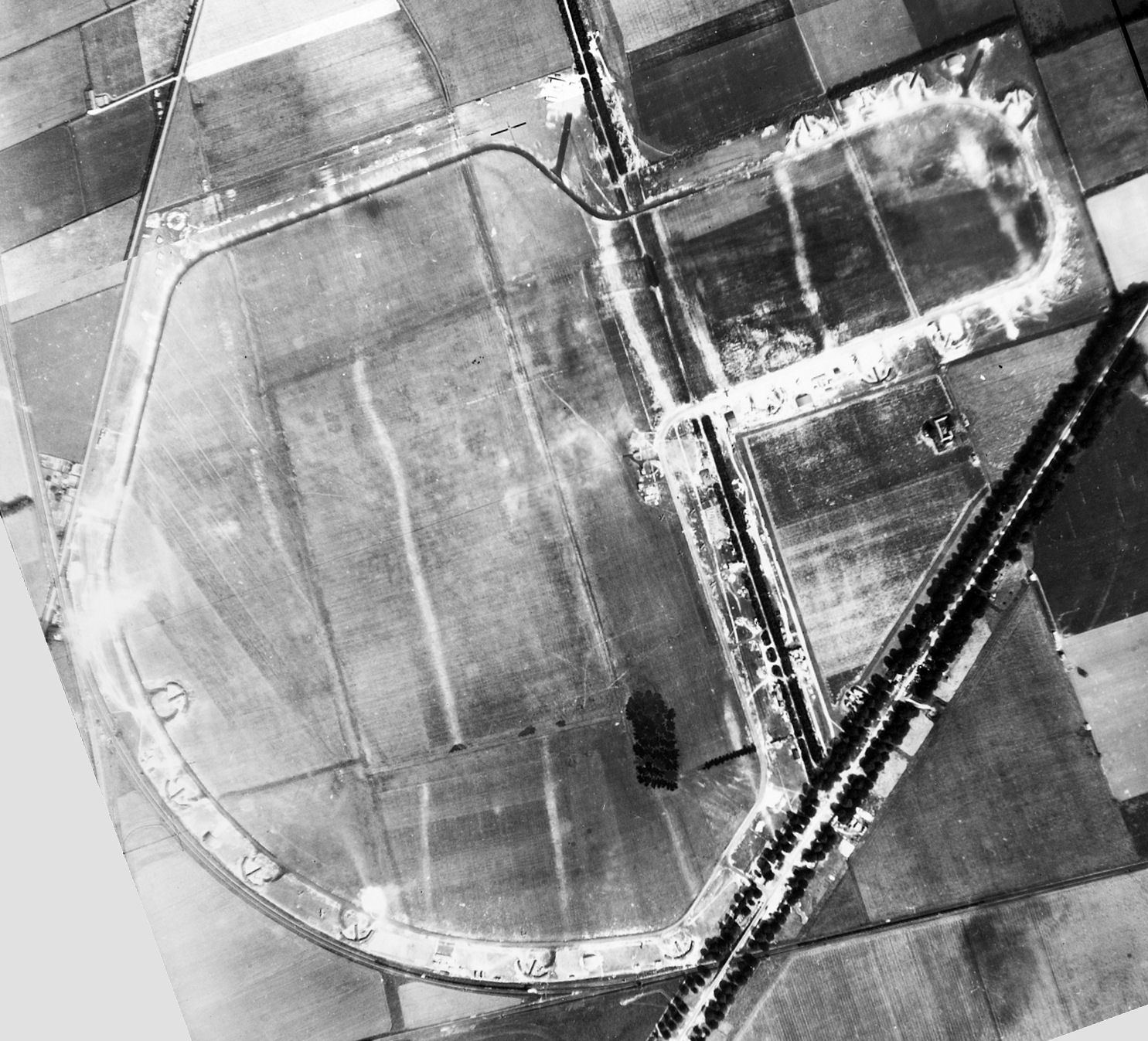
- Aerial photograph of Snailwell airfield, 26 July 1942

Site information
- Type: Royal Air Force station
- Code: SW
- Owner: Air Ministry
- Operator: Royal Air Force; United States Army Air Forces
- Controlled by: RAF Army Cooperation Command; 1941-43; RAF Fighter Command; 1943-44 * No. 12 Group RAF; RAF Technical Training Command 1944- * No. 28 Group RAF

Location
- Shown within Cambridgeshire RAF Snailwell (the United Kingdom)
- Coordinates: 52°16′28″N 000°25′11″E

Site history
- Built: 1940/41
- In use: March 1941 – 1946
- Battles/wars: European theatre of World War II

Airfield information
- Elevation: 70 feet (21 m) AMSL
Runways
Direction	Length and surface
00/00	Grass
00/00	Grass
00/00	Grass

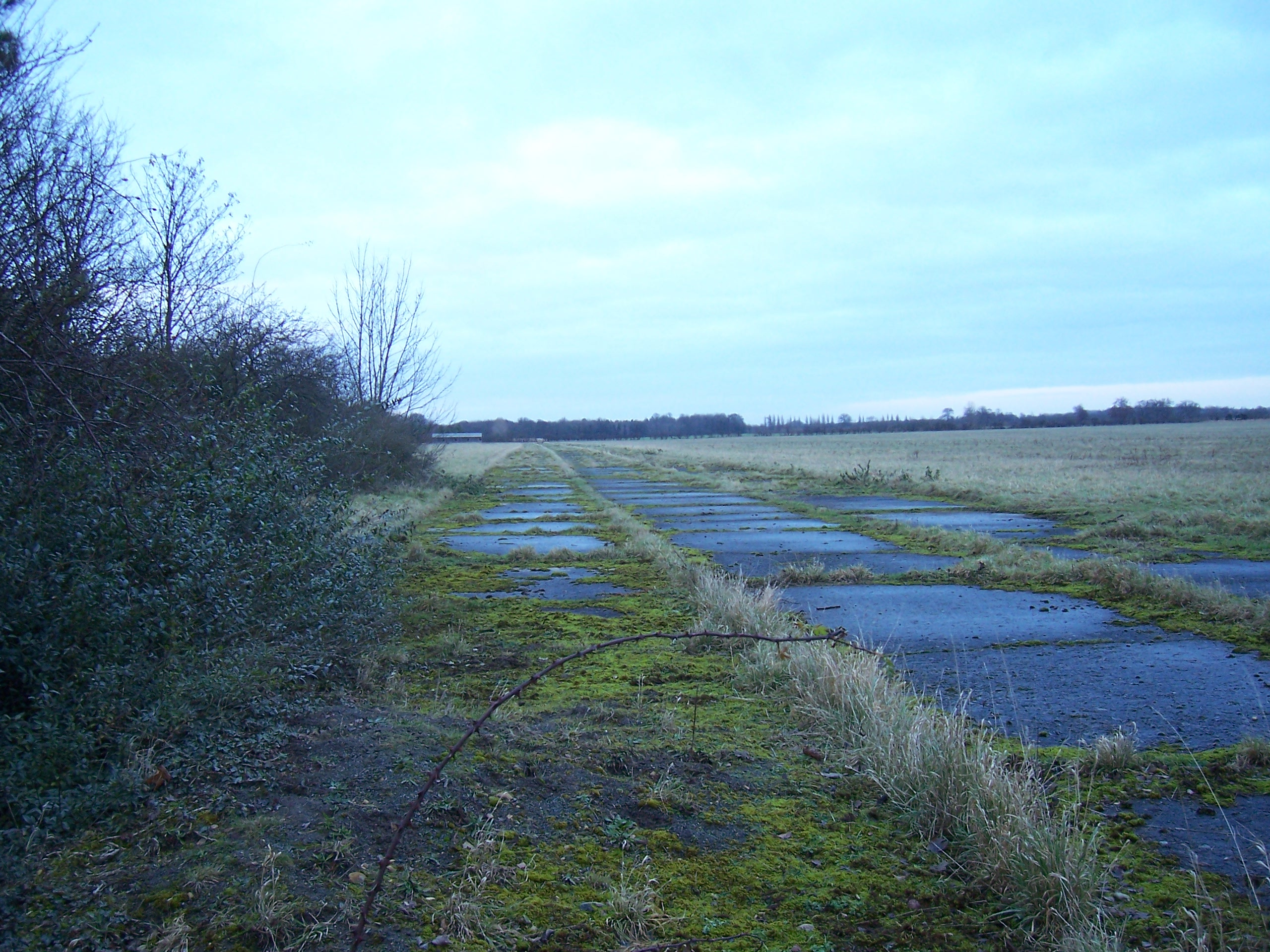
Photograph of segment of taxiway remaining on the site of RAF Snailwell in December 2005, taken at grid reference TL 652 668 looking roughly North East

Royal Air Force Snailwell or more simply RAF Snailwell is a former Royal Air Force station located near to the village of Snailwell, Cambridgeshire, located 3 miles (5 km) north of Newmarket, Suffolk, England.

== History ==
- USAAF 347th Fighter Squadron — Bell P-39 Airacobra

== Operational Royal Air Force units and aircraft ==
- No. 56 Squadron RAF (1942) – Hawker Typhoon IA and IB.
- No. 137 Squadron RAF (1942) – Westland Whirlwind I.
- No. 152 (Hyderabad) Squadron RAF (1941) – Supermarine Spitfire IIA.
- No. 168 Squadron RAF (1942) – Curtiss Tomahawk II.
- No. 170 Squadron RAF (1943) – North American Mustang I.
- No. 181 Squadron RAF (1943) – Hawker Typhoon IB.
- No. 182 Squadron RAF (1943) – Hawker Typhoon IB.
- No. 183 (Gold Coast) Squadron RAF (1943) – Hawker Typhoon IB.
- No. 184 Squadron RAF (1943) – Hawker Hurricane IV.
- No. 247 (China-British) Squadron RAF (1943) – Hawker Typhoon IB.
- No. 268 Squadron RAF (1941) – Westland Lysander, Curtiss Tomahawk IIA.
- No. 268 Squadron RAF (1942) – North American Mustang I.
- No. 309 Polish Fighter-Reconnaissance Squadron (1943) – North American Mustang I.
- No. 527 Squadron RAF (1944) – Bristol Blenheim IV, Hawker Hurricane IIB.
- No. 613 (City of Manchester) Squadron RAuxAF (1943) – North American Mustang I.

Units

- No. 2 Heavy Glider Maintenance Unit
- No. 3 Group Communication Flight RAF
- No. 5 (RCAF) Casualty Air Evacuation Unit
- No. 22 Elementary Flying Training School RAF
- No. 417 Repair & Salvage Unit
- No. 2720 Squadron RAF Regiment
- No. 2751 Squadron RAF Regiment
- No. 2759 Squadron RAF Regiment
- No. 2794 Squadron RAF Regiment
- No. 2809 Squadron RAF Regiment
- No. 2876 Squadron RAF Regiment
- No. 3207 Servicing Commando
- RAF (Belgian) Training School

== Current use ==
The site has now returned to agriculture and paddocks.
