= No. 268 Squadron RAF =

Defunct flying squadron of the Royal Air Force

- Active: 1918–1919; 1940–1945; 1945–1946
- Country: United Kingdom
- Branch: Royal Air Force
- Type: Flying squadron
- Motto: Adjidaumo Ojibwe: Tail in the air

No. 268 Squadron RAF was a Royal Air Force squadron raised during the First World War and in the Second World War operated the North American P-51 Mustang on tactical reconnaissance missions over occupied Europe and in support of the D-Day landings.

== History ==
=== First World War ===
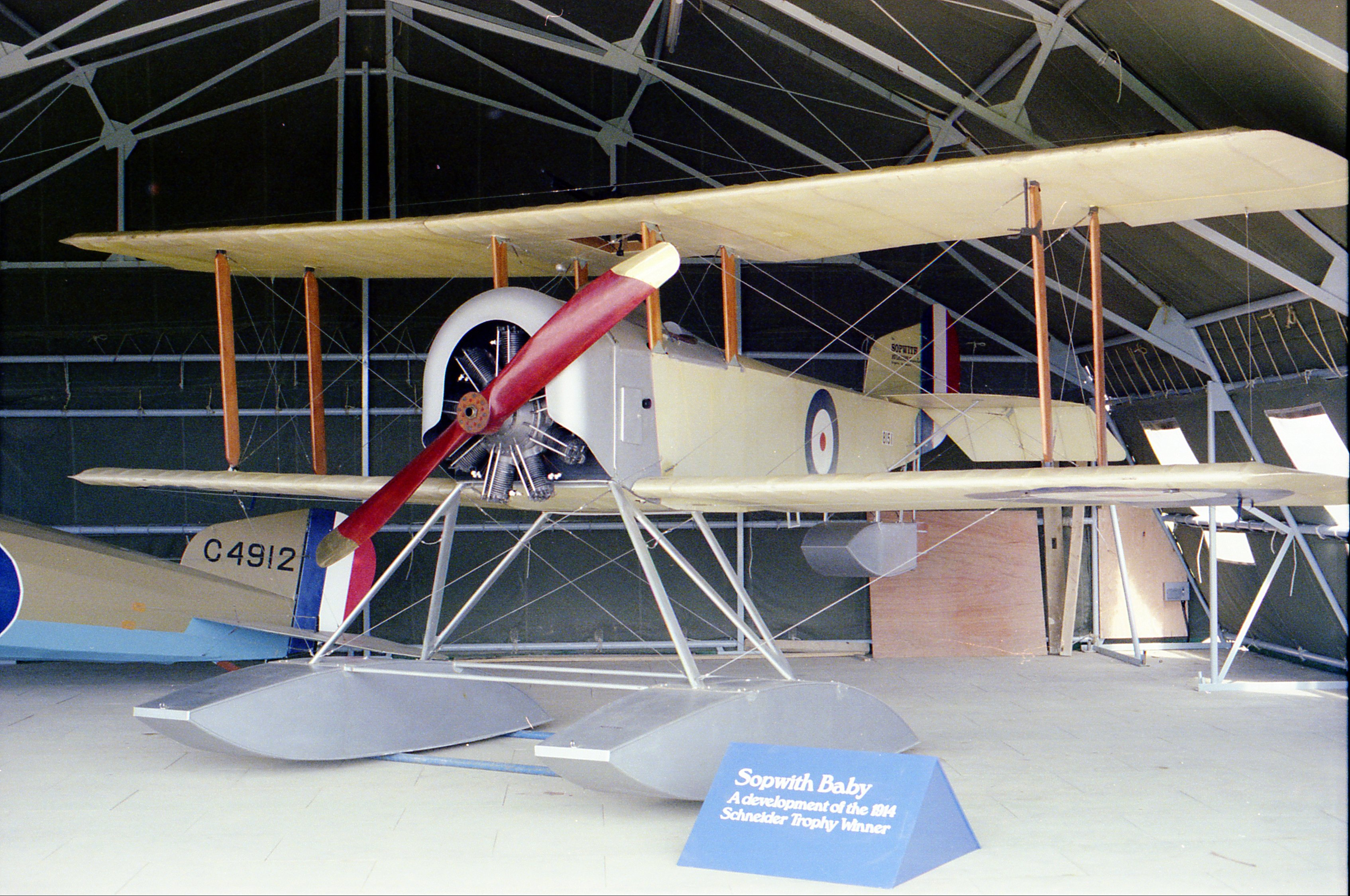
Sopwith "Baby" Float Plane

The squadron was formed at Kalafrana, Malta in August 1918 as an anti-submarine warfare patrol unit, flying Sopwith Baby, Short 184, Short 320 float planes and Felixstowe F.3 flying boats. In October 1918, the squadron provided the nucleus of 433 and 434 (Seaplane) Flights, which were also based at Kalafrana and used Short 184 seaplanes. After a short period of service as independent entities, the flights returned to 268 Squadron in March 1919. The squadron patrolled the Mediterranean surrounding Malta and had only one recorded combat action, an unsuccessful attack on a U-boat on 14 November 1918; the squadron was disbanded on 11 October 1919. The Squadron commanding officer was Major A. M. Cave.

=== Second World War ===
The squadron number was reactivated in April 1939 but no action was taken to reform the squadron until late in 1940. No. 268 Squadron was reformed at Westley Aerodrome near Bury St Edmunds in England on 30 September 1940 as an Army Co-operation Command squadron, flying Lysander Mk.II, Tiger Moth and Magister aircraft. The squadron was formed by merging A Flight of II (AC) Squadron with ‘B’ Flight of 26 Squadron. The first commanding officer of the reformed squadron was Squadron Leader P. de G. H. Seymour, soon after promoted to the rank of wing commander. The initial task for the squadron was anti-invasion patrols along the coast of southern England and reconnaissance of potential invasion sites in Britain. The squadron also had a secondary role in providing elementary pilot training for Army personnel who had been selected for training as glider pilots.

In May 1941, then under the command of Wing Commander A. F. Anderson DFC, the squadron started to re-equip with Curtiss P-40 Tomahawk aircraft, keeping a few Lysanders for some months after re-equipment commenced. During this time, the squadron moved to RAF Snailwell in Cambridgeshire. After being declared operational on the new aircraft, the squadron commenced support for Army training exercises and undertook shipping patrols in the English Channel and North Sea, primarily along the coast of northern France, Belgium and the Netherlands, combined with a training programme for aircrew and ground crews.

In April 1942 the squadron re-equipped again with the North American Mustang Mk.I. A few Tomahawks were retained until mid-1943 for non-operational use, as they carried vertical or oblique reconnaissance cameras, until the new Mustangs had them fitted. The Tomahawks were used for training and in exercises where reconnaissance photography was required. On 15 June 1942, a number of pilots and the majority of the remaining Tomahawks with the squadron were transferred from the squadron to form the cadre of the new 168 Squadron.

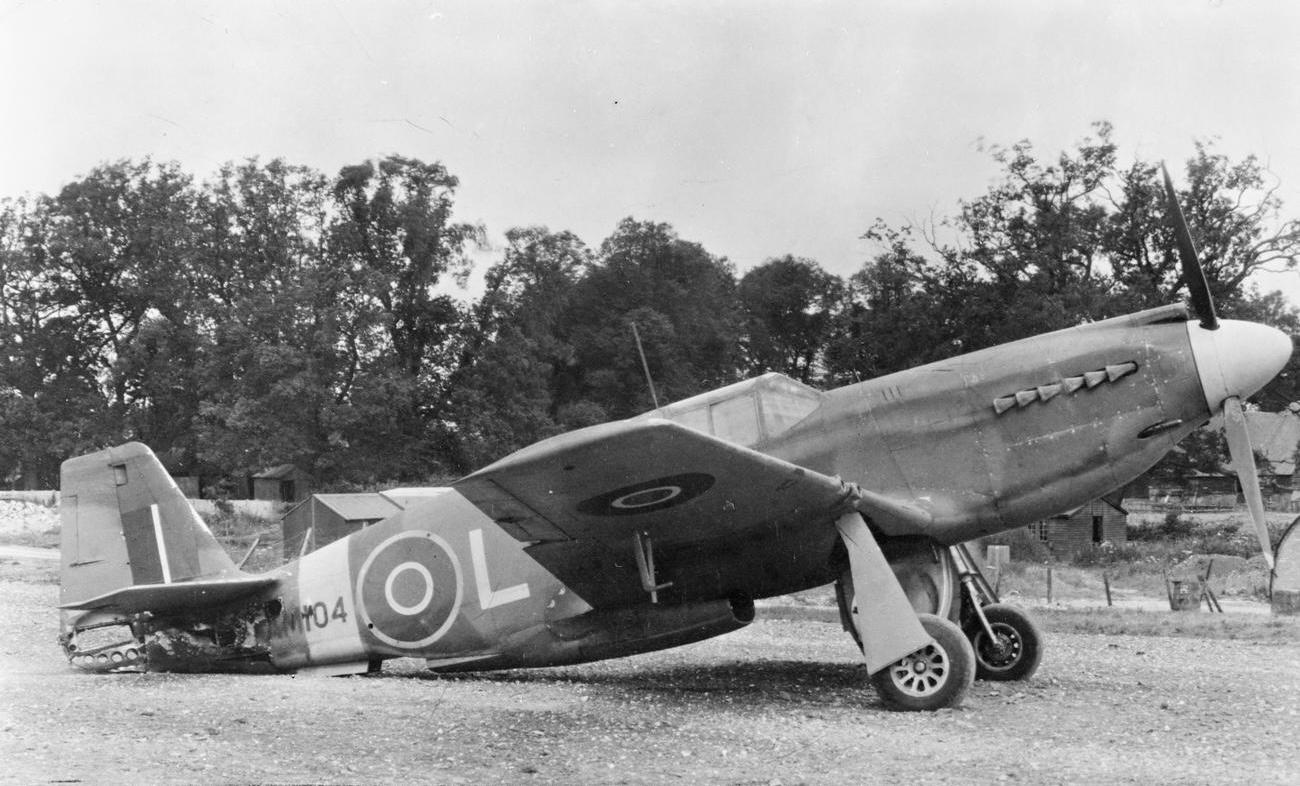
A damaged 268 Squadron Mustang Mk I at RAF Odiham, 1943.

No. 268 Squadron was declared operational with the Mustang Mk.I in June 1942 and returned to reconnaissance and intruder operations over the Channel and southern North Sea coasts. The squadron suffered some casualties by enemy action and mechanical failure as they ranged more frequently into German controlled areas. The pace of squadron operations grew in the later half of 1942, including close escort to bombing raids.

On 21 October 1942, on a mission to the Dortmund-Ems Canal and objectives in Holland the Mustang Mk.Is of 268 Squadron became the first single-engined fighters based in the UK to cross the German border. The mission was conducted by four aircraft and led by Wing Commander A. F. Anderson, with Flt Lt B. P. W. Clapin, Plt Off O. R. Chapman RNZAF and Flg Off W. T. Hawkins RNZAF. This mission caused a great deal of consternation to the German High Command, as single-engined RAF fighters from Britain over Germany meant that a new level of threat had to be considered. On 26 November 1942, during an operation over Holland, Flg Off R. A. Bethell, spotted and shot down a Messerschmitt Bf 109 and shortly after sighted a Junkers Ju.52 transport aircraft which he promptly shot down in flames (post-war analysis indicates these were in fact a Klemm trainer and a Junkers W 34 target tug), the squadron's first recorded air to air combat victories. On 13 December 1942, two aircraft of 268 Squadron flew to the Wittmund–Jade Canal, Christen Canal and Dortmund–Ems Canal and shot up targets of opportunity, including trucks, barges, tugs and a searchlight. The squadron, especially the squadron engineering staff, developed oblique and vertical reconnaissance photography mounts and controls for the Mustang aircraft.

In early 1943, operations continued over German-occupied territory, especially over the Netherlands, with losses to squadron personnel and aircraft but not without exacting a toll on the Luftwaffe. In early March 1943, the squadron, commanded by Wing Commander P. A. Dudgeon DFC, participated as a part of X Mobile Composite Group, representing enemy forces in Exercise Spartan. In May and June 1943 the squadron was operating in southern England, conducting morning and evening patrols at low level against low flying enemy hit and run raiders and reconnaissance aircraft.

In July 1943 the squadron, commanded by Sqn Ldr G. Pallot, re-equipped again, this time to the North American Mustang Mk.IA aircraft. The primary differences between this version and the earlier Mk.I was in armament with a change to four 20 mm cannon and a more powerful engine. The squadron also had from early to late 1943 one or two early car door Hawker Typhoon Mk.I aircraft which were used for pilot familiarisation flying and dis-similar air combat practise flying.

Into the second half of 1943 the hectic pace of operations continued, with the squadron busy in Operation Starkey from 27 August to 9 September 1943. In November 1943 the squadron transferred to RAF Turnhouse outside Edinburgh, Scotland, exchanging its aircraft with those of 63 Squadron, to conduct a period of rebuilding and training in preparation for the invasion of occupied Europe in 1944. The squadron became a part of 35 (Reconnaissance) Wing of 2nd Tactical Air Force.

The squadron moved south again in early 1944, under Squadron Leader A. S. Mann DFC, regaining its North American Mustang Mk.IA aircraft and initially being based at North Weald. Operational activity at this time was largely focussed on reconnaissance against the German V1 flying bombs sites then starting to appear in France and aircraft from the squadron were responsible for obtaining some of the first, clear, low level photography of V1 launching sites in France. Activity continued into early 1944 with an air to air gunnery course in Wales during February and a move to RAF Sawbridgeworth at the beginning of March 1944. The squadron then attended a naval gunfire direction course at Dundonald in Scotland in late March to early April. The squadron moved to RAF Gatwick and commenced intensive reconnaissance operations in preparation for the invasion. Many sorties were conducted at extremely low level against a range of targets, including German coast defences, lines of communication, supply centres, radar sites and airfields. Losses were incurred but the squadron was also scoring; just before D-Day, aircraft from the squadron conducted special last minute sorties to check on the state of German defensive preparations in the invasion area.

For D-Day, 6 June 1944, the squadron initially operated providing naval gunnery spotting and direction for units of the Home Fleet bombarding enemy defences operating from RNAS Lee-on-Solent. Later in the day the squadron flew tactical reconnaissances searching out German reinforcements and units behind the beachhead, with sorties late in the evening as far east as the western outskirts of Paris. The squadron suffered one recorded loss on D-Day, a pilot who was returning to base with engine trouble went missing over the Channel. The tactical reconnaissance role in support of the invading Allied armies and primarily the First Canadian Army, was to continue as the main role for the squadron for the remainder of the war.

In July 1944 the squadron started to re-equip with the Hawker Typhoon FR.Ib. The Typhoon was a different beast to the squadron's beloved Mustangs and met a mixed reception. Given the shorter operational range of the Typhoon compared to the Mustang and generally inferior quality of the reconnaissance photography from the Typhoon caused by engine vibrations shaking the airframe, the Typhoon FR.Ib only equipped one flight of the squadron, the other two flights continuing to operate Mustang Mk.IAs. The Typhoon eventually proved not to be suitable for tactical reconnaissance and they were retired from the squadron by the end of November 1944 to be replaced by the North American Mustang Mk.II.

In early August 1944 the squadron moved to the continent and then commenced a period of high mobility moving behind the advancing Allied armies, providing reconnaissance coverage of the ever changing frontline and German rear areas. The squadron was involved in reconnaissance sorties covering the German retreat from France, including the Falaise Gap, retreat over the Seine and pursuit of the Germans through Belgium and the Netherlands. Again losses were suffered but they tended to be more from flak rather than fighter opposition. The squadron also flew sorties to search for German V2 rocket launching sites in Belgium and the Netherlands.

From August 1944 the squadron was based in turn at Beny-Sur-Mer, Plumetot, Boisney, Fresnoy-Folny, St. Omer/Fort Rouge in France, St Denijs Westrem/Ghent and Deurne/Antwerp in Belgium. Some times the squadron remained at an airfield for a few days before moving on. At Deurne/Antwerp in October 1944 the squadron was honoured, along with the other units in 35 (Recce) Wing, with a visit by King George VI, accompanied by Field Marshal Montgomery, General Miles Dempsey (C-in-C Second Army), General Harry Crerar (C-in-C First Canadian Army), Air Marshal Arthur Conningham (C-in-C 2TAF), Air Vice Marshal Leslie Brown (OC 84 Group, 2 TAF) and various aide-de-camps. Shortly afterwards the squadron was also inspected by the RAF Chief of the Air Staff, Marshal of the RAF Sir Charles Portal.

By 1 January 1945 the squadron was located at Gilze Rijen in the Netherlands and scored one of its last confirmed air to air combat victories against German aircraft taking part in the massed air raid on Allied airfields that day.Flt Lt J. Lyke damaged and possibly shot down a Focke-Wulf Fw 190A and Flt Lt A. Mercer shot down a Junkers Ju 88 G6 which crashed near Utrecht, one of the last recorded air-to-air kills by an Allison-engined Mustang of the war. The last recorded air to air victory scored by an aircraft of the squadron was a Focke-Wulf Fw 190 shot down by Flt Lt S. J. Perkins RAFVR flying Mustang Mk.II FR896, near Krefeld on 28 February 1945; the month also saw the squadron's last recorded casualty for the war, Flt Lt F. R. Normoyle RAAF, shot down and killed by German anti-aircraft fire near Bocholt on 8 February 1945.

In April 1945 the squadron, commanded by Squadron Leader C. T. P. Stephenson DFC, moved from Mill to Twenthe and commenced re-equipment with the Supermarine Spitfire FR.XIVE, a reconnaissance version of the Rolls-Royce Griffon engined variant of the Spitfire, which was used with the remaining Mustangs, at that stage some Mustang Mk.IAs and larger number of Mustang Mk.IIs. The squadron used these up to and after VE Day in May 1945; the squadron continued in the occupying Allied forces and moved to Celle in late May 1945. In August 1945 the squadron retired the last of its Allison-engined Mustangs after forty months. In mid-September 1945 the squadron took on the specialist high-altitude reconnaissance Supermarine Spitfire PR.XIX, these aircraft being largely acquired by the transfer of a flight from 16 Squadron.

On 19 September 1945, as a part of the general restructuring of the post-war RAF and repatriation of Commonwealth aircrew, the squadron was disbanded at Celle in Germany and re-numbered 16 Squadron RAF. The squadron's final commanding officer for tactical reconnaissance was Squadron Leader C. T. P. Stephenson DFC & Bar. The re-numbered 16 Squadron continued as a tactical/fighter reconnaissance squadron until 1 April 1946, at that time under the command of a former member of 268 Squadron, Squadron Leader E. J. Milne DFC RAFVR. It was disbanded on the transfer of the squadron from British Air Forces of Occupation to Fighter Command on 1 April 1946 and 56 Squadron which flew the Hawker Tempest Mk.V was re-numbered 16 Squadron.

On the same day, 19 September 1945, No. 487 Squadron RNZAF under the command of Wing Commander W. P. Kemp DSO DFC, was disbanded and re-numbered as No. 16 Squadron RNZAF. This led to a period where the aircraft of the new 16 Squadron flying Supermarine Spitfires and the re-numbered 268 Squadron carried the same EG squadron identification letters on their aircraft. The administrative error of two 16 Squadrons was soon corrected and on 1 October 1945, 487 Squadron became 268 Squadron, a light bomber squadron operating the de Havilland Mosquito FB.VI. In early 1946 a number of the squadron's aircrew and aircraft were detached to form part of the Nuremberg Courier Flight supporting the Nuremberg War Trials and participated in a recreation of the attack on the Amiens Prison Operation Jericho that occurred in 1944 for the filming of a documentary film on that event. The squadron was finally disbanded on 30 March 1946, when based at A 75 Cambrai/Epinoy, with a detachment at B 56 Evere/Brussels (which had commenced in December 1945).

During its wartime existence from September 1940 to May 1945, the squadron included aircrew from England, Northern Ireland, Scotland, Wales, Australia, British West Indies, Canada, India, New Zealand, Poland and the US. The squadron suffered twenty-eight casualties during the war, twenty-one aircrew killed due to enemy action or whilst on operations and seven killed in accidents during training. Five pilots were shot down during operations and made Prisoners of War.

== Badge ==
In November 1941, the squadron was granted its squadron badge and motto, the badge being a swallow soaring holding a tomahawk in its claws – the swallow representing reconnaissance at all levels and the tomahawk equating to the aircraft type in service with the squadron – the motto of Adjidaumo 'Tail in Air' – drawn from the Chippewa, a dialectal form of the Ojibwe Native American language and as in Wordsworth's The Song of Hiawatha.

== Aircraft operated ==
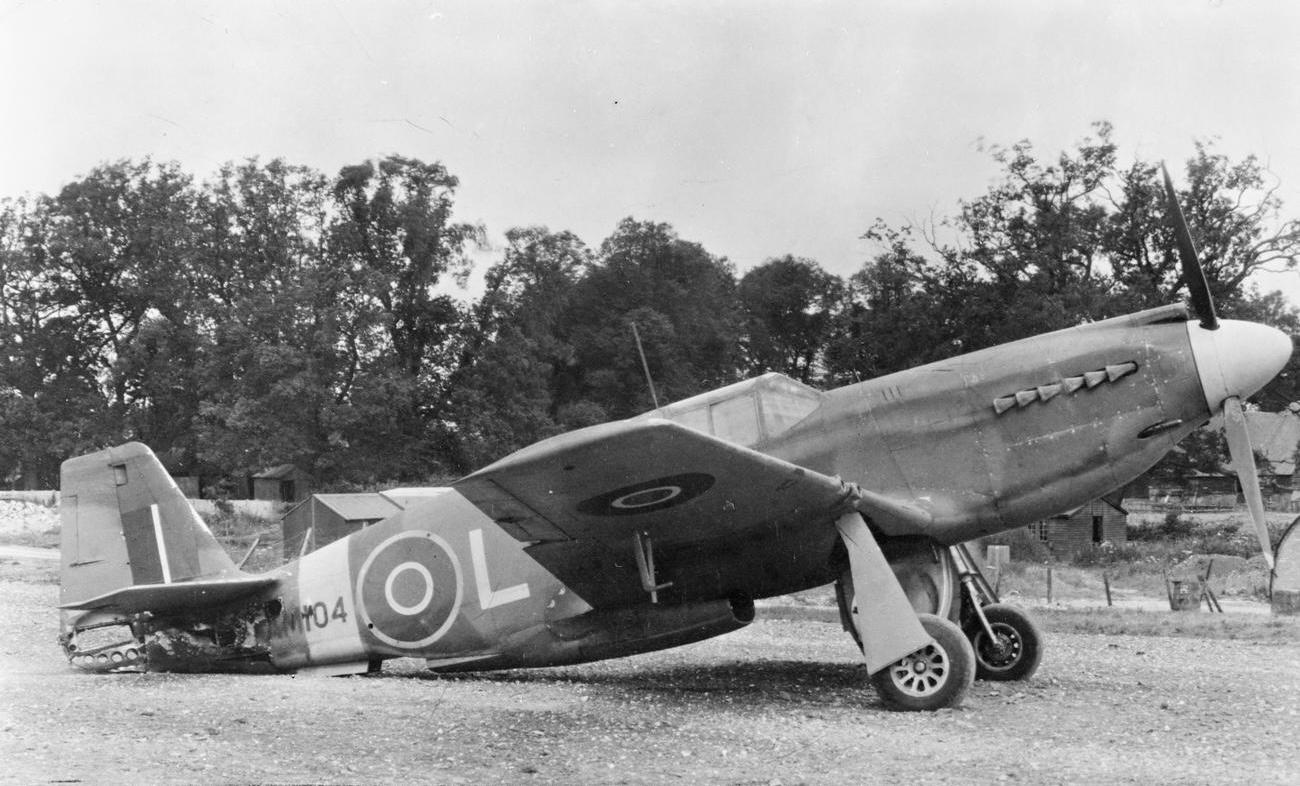
A combat-damaged 268 Sqn Mustang I at RAF Odiham, 1943.

- Data from Jefford (1988).

Dates	Aircraft	Variant	Notes
1918–1919	Sopwith Baby		Single-engined seaplane
1918–1919	Short 184		Single-engined torpedo seaplane
1918–1919	Short 320		Single-engined torpedo seaplane
1918–1919	Felixstowe F.3		Twin-engined patrol flying boat
1940–1942	Westland Lysander	II and then III	Single-engined liaison
1941–1942	Curtiss Tomahawk	IIA	Single-engined fighter
1942–1945	North American Mustang	I then IA	Single-engined fighter-reconnaissance
1943-1944	Hawker Typhoon	Mk.IB and FR IB	Single-engined fighter
1944–1945	North American Mustang	II	Single-engined fighter-reconnaissance
1945	Supermarine Spitfire	FR.XIVe and PR.XIX	Single-engined fighter-reconnaissance and dedicated photo reconnaissance
1945–1946	de Havilland Mosquito	VI	Twin-engined light bomber

== Notable squadron members ==
- Ken Wallis
- Karun Majumdar DFC & Bar
