= No. 35 Wing RAF =

No. 35 Wing RAF 35th (Training) Wing RFC No. 35 (Army Co-operation Wing) RAF No. 35 Reconnaissance Wing RAF

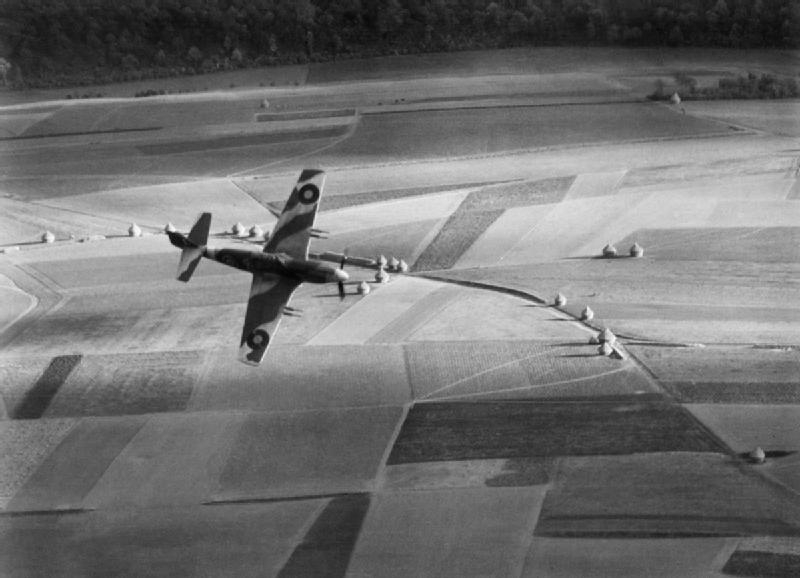
- A No.35 (PR) Wing North American Mustang I over France, in November 1943.
- Active: 1917-19; 1941-46
- Country: United Kingdom
- Branch: Royal Air Force; Royal Flying Corps
- Role: Air supremacy
- Size: Wing
- Last base: B.118 Celle

Aircraft flown
- Attack: Hawker Typhoon

No. 35 Wing RAF was a reconnaissance formation of the Royal Air Force during both the First World War and the Second World War.

== First World War ==
The wing was formed as 35th (Training) Wing RFC at Stamford on 22 September 1917 controlling Stamford and Easton-on-the-Hill Aerodrome. The wing disbanded into 3rd Group on 9 September 1919.

== Second World War ==
The wing was reformed as No. 35 (Army Co-operation) Wing RAF on 22 August 1941 out of the former No. 71 Group RAF. It was part of RAF Army Cooperation Command and controlled units within Southern England and began controlling No. 123 Airfield Headquarters RAF during April 1943. The wing was transferred to No. 11 Group RAF, RAF Fighter Command on 1 June 1943 as No. 35 Reconnaissance Wing RAF and part of No. 84 Group RAF, RAF Second Tactical Air Force. The wing moved to RAF Odiham on 28 June 1943 and began controlling No. 130 Airfield Headquarters RAF on 10 July 1943, the wing moved to France and B.4 Beny-sur Mer on 15 August 1944. It then moved to B.27 Boisney, B.31 Fresnoy-Folny. B.43 Fort Rouge, B.61 Ghent/St. Denis Westrem, B.70 Antwerp/Deurne, B.75 Glize-Rijen, B.89 Mill, B.106 Twente/Enscehde and finally B.118 Celle on 30 May 1945 where the unit was disbanded on 22 June 1946.

Squadrons controlled: 2, 4, 13, 16, 26, 140, 168, 171, 174, 175, 239, 268, 318, 400, 414, 614, 652, 653 & 655.
