= No. 170 Squadron RAF =

Defunct flying squadron of the Royal Air Force

- Active: 1942-1944; 1944-1945
- Country: United Kingdom
- Branch: Royal Air Force
- Motto(s): Videre Non Videri ("To see is not to be seen")

No. 170 Squadron RAF was a Second World War Royal Air Force squadron that operated the North American Mustang in the fighter-reconnaissance role and later the Avro Lancaster as part of Bomber Command.

== History ==
The squadron was formed at RAF Weston Zoyland on 15 June 1942 as a fighter-reconnaissance squadron equipped with the American-built North American Mustang I. After a few months' training with the Army it began operations over continental Europe in January 1943. In the first few months of action it had a speciality for attacking and destroying rail traffic. It eventually operated defensive patrols against German fighter-bombers until it was disbanded at RAF Sawbridgeworth on 15 January 1944.

No. 170 Squadron was re-formed on 15 October 1944 at RAF Kelstern from C Flight of 625 Squadron, moving shortly to RAF Dunholme Lodge then again to RAF Hemswell. Equipped with the four-engined Avro Lancaster heavy bomber it was soon operating as part of the Bomber Command offensive over Germany through the winter of 1944/45. As the risk from German fighters grew less it also operated daylight raids. It only operated as a heavy bomber unit for six months but flew 980 sorties with the loss of 13 Lancasters. Following its last raid on 25 April 1945 against Berchtesgaden it concentrated on dropping relief supplies into the Netherlands and transporting prisoners of war and troops back to England from Germany. With its job done it was disbanded on 14 November 1945.

There is a 170 Sqn. memorial at the former RAF Hemswell site.

== Aircraft operated ==
| Dates | Aircraft | Variant | Notes |
|---|---|---|---|
| 1942-1944 | North American Mustang | I and IA | Single-engined fighter |
| 1944-1945 | Avro Lancaster | I and III | Four-engined heavy bomber |

== Squadron Commanders ==
1945 - Sqn Ldr Basil Templeman-Rooke

== Pilots ==
1944-1945 - Pilot Officer Robert Byron Pattison

1944-1945 - Flight Lieutenant Donald Edward Thomas Hudson DFC

1944-1945 Flight Lieutenant Denis Michael Evans

1944-1944 Pilot Officer Jack Stevenson

194?/1943 Flying Officer Hector William Munro RCAF KIA 24th November 1943 Buried at Brookwood Military Cemetery.
