= No. 137 Squadron RAF =

Defunct flying squadron of the Royal Air Force

- Active: 1 Apr 1918 – 4 Jul 1918; 20 Sep 1941 – 25 Aug 1945
- Country: United Kingdom
- Branch: Royal Air Force
- Part of: RAF Fighter Command
- Mottos: Do right, fear naught

Insignia
- Squadron Badge heraldry: A horse's head couped
- Squadron Codes: SF (Feb 1941 – Aug 1945)

No. 137 Squadron RAF existed briefly as a day bomber unit in World War I but never became operational. During World War II it flew as one of the two Whirlwind squadrons before converting to Hurricane Mk.IV fighter-bombers and later the Hawker Typhoon in the same role. The squadron was disbanded in August 1945.

== History ==
=== Formation and World War I ===
No. 137 Squadron RAF existed briefly as a unit working up to be a day bomber unit on Airco DH.9s during World War I, but it never became operational. It was formed at Shawbury on 1 April 1918 and was disbanded there on 4 July 1918, together with 12 other such units. Plans to reinstate the squadron in September as laid out in Air Organisation Memorandum 939 of 13 July 1918 came to nought as Air Organisation Memorandum 999 of 17 August 1918 cancelled these.

=== Second World War ===
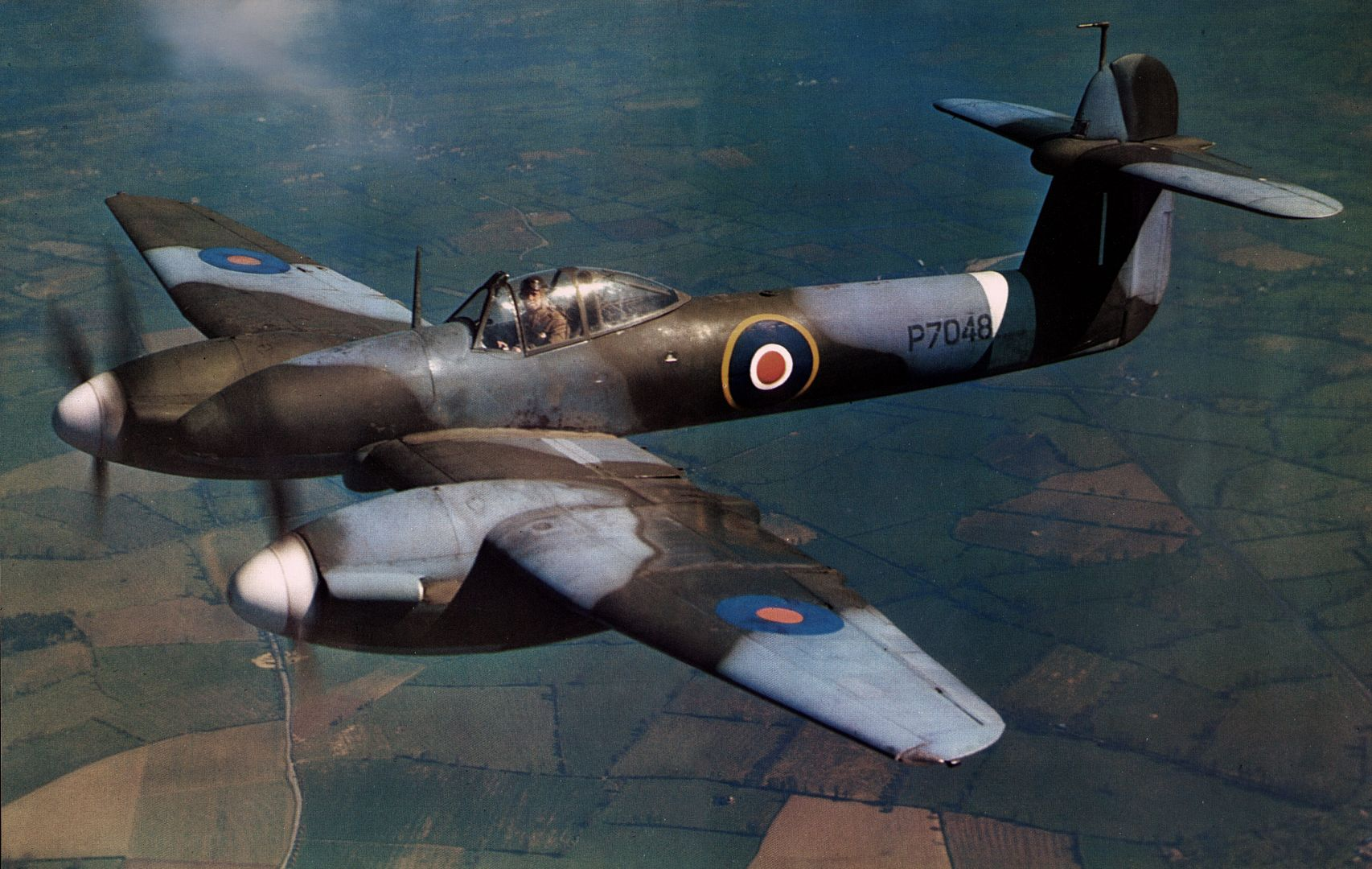
A Westland Whirlwind as used by 137 squadron

The squadron was reformed at Charmy Down on 20 September 1941 and equipped with the then brand new two-engined Westland Whirlwind four-cannon fighter. The squadron became operational with them on 20 October and flew its first mission (a mandolin) four days afterwards. Unfortunately the new CO, S/Ldr Sample, was killed four days after this in a mid-air collision with a new pilot. Two days later another pilot crashed into the sea. After this bad start, No. 137 became non-operational for a period before resuming with coastal missions on 11 November. On one such mission on 12 February 1942, to escort some destroyers, they met by accident the fighter screen around the Scharnhorst and the Gneisenau, losing four pilots in the event.

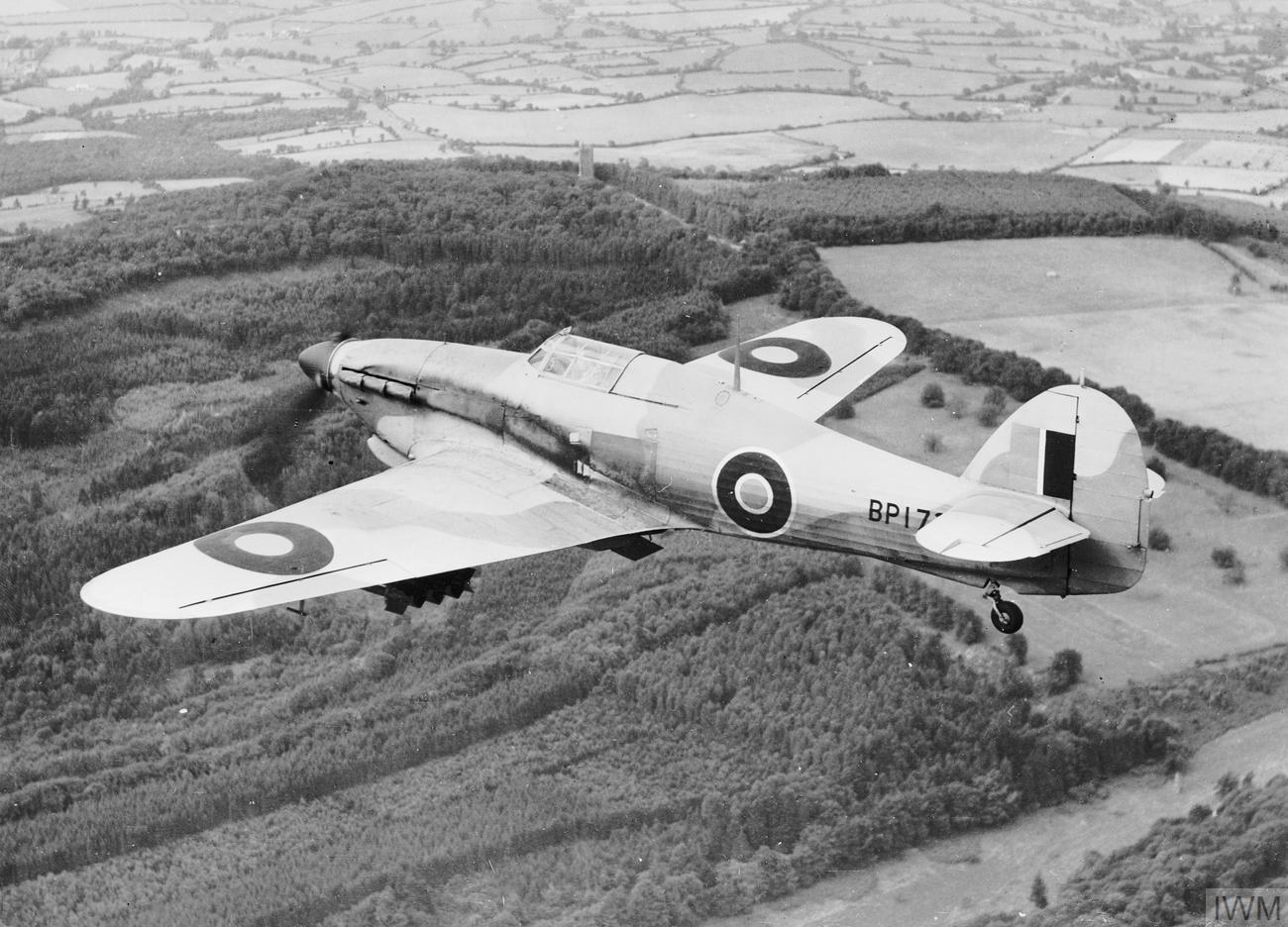
A Hawker Hurricane Mk.IV

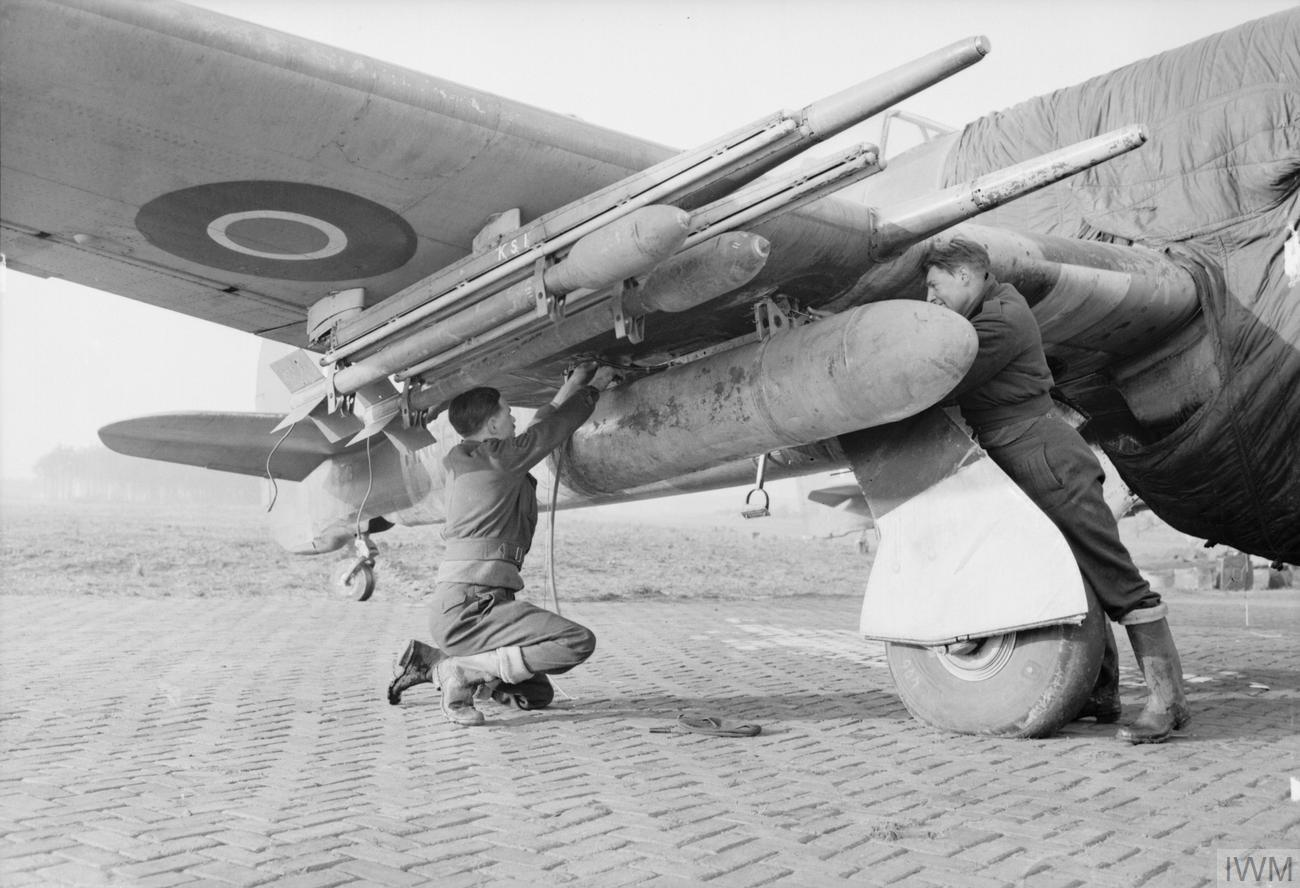
Crew attaching a long-range fuel tank to a Hawker Typhoon Mark IB of No. 137 Squadron at B78 Eindhoven, the Netherlands

In June 1943 the by now worn-out Whirlwinds were replaced with Hurricane Mk.IV fighter-bombers and in July the squadron flew operationally with them again until February 1944 when the Hurricane was exchanged for the more modern and higher performance Hawker Typhoon. 137 flew this new fighter-bomber operationally from 8 February 1944 until 25 August 1945, when it was disbanded at RAF Warmwell by being renumbered to 174 Squadron.

== Organisation ==
=== Commanding officers ===
Officers commanding No. 137 Squadron RAF in the past:
Served from	Name	Notes
September 1941	Sqn/Ldr J. Sample, DFC	
November 1941	Sqn/Ldr H.St.J. Coghlan	
May 1943	Sqn/Ldr J.B. Wray, DFC	
December 1943	Sqn/Ldr J.R. Dennehey, DFC	
April 1944	Sqn/Ldr G. Piltingsrud, DFC	
September 1944	Sqn/Ldr E. T. Brough, DFC	
December 1944	Sqn/Ldr R.G.V. Barraclough	
March 1945	Sqn/Ldr D. Murray, DFC	

=== Squadron bases ===
Squadron bases used by No. 137 Squadron RAF
Arrival	Base
1 April 1918	RAF Shawbury
20 September 1941	RAF Charmy Down
8 November 1941	RAF Coltishall
1 December 1941	RAF Matlaske detachments at RAF Snailwell & RAF Drem
24 August 1942	RAF Snailwell
17 September 1942	RAF Manston
12 June 1943	RAF Rochford
8 August 1943	RAF Manston
14 December 1943	RAF Lympne
2 January 1944	RAF Colerne
4 February 1944	RAF Lympne
1 April 1944	RAF Manston
13 August 1944	Coulombs (B.6)
29 August 1944	Créton (B.30)
3 September 1944	Amiens/Glisy (B.48)
6 September 1944	Melsbroek (B.58)
22 September 1944	Eindhoven (Welschap) (B.78)
13 January 1945	Helmond (B.86)
11 April 1945	Twente (B.106)
13 April 1945	Hopsten (B.112)
17 April 1945	Langenhagen (B.120)
30 April 1945	Lüneburg (B.156)
7 May 1945	RAF Celle (B118)
9 May 1945	Kastrup (B160)
21 June 1945	Husum (B172)
11 July 1945	Lübeck (B158)
20 August 1945	RAF Warmwell

== See also ==
- List of Royal Air Force aircraft squadrons
