= No. 241 Squadron RAF =

Defunct flying squadron of the Royal Air Force

- Active: 1918-1919, 1940-1945
- Country: United Kingdom
- Branch: Royal Air Force
- Type: Flying squadron
- Mottos: "Find and forewarn"

No. 241 Squadron is a former squadron of the Royal Air Force (RAF) formed during the First World War.

== History ==
No. 241 Squadron was formed in August 1918 from the former Royal Naval Air Service flights operating at the RNAS seaplane station at the Isle of Portland (HMS Serepta) and their airfield at Chickerell; Flight numbers 416, 417 and 513. They continued to fly patrols over the English Channel hunting submarines until the end of the war. The squadron was disbanded the following year, on 18 June 1919.

The squadron was reformed in the Second World War. A flight of No. 614 Squadron RAF was redesignated as 241 Squadron on 25 September 1940 at Inverness.

The squadron initially operated the Westland Lysander. To this were added some Blackburn Roc naval dive bombers and some Curtiss Tomahawks. In April 1942, the squadron moved to North Africa with Hawker Hurricanes where it flew reconnaissance and ground attack during the Tunisian campaign.

The Hurricanes were replaced with Spitfires in December 1943. The squadron operated various reconnaissance and ground attack duties in Italy until the end of the war. The squadron was disbanded on 14 August 1945.
