= 400 Tactical Helicopter Squadron =

No. 400 Tactical Helicopter Squadron
- No. 400 Squadron RCAF badge
- Active: 5 October 1932 – 7 August 1945; 15 April 1946 – Present
- Country: Canada
- Branch: (Canada) Royal Canadian Air Force
- Role: CH-146 2nd maintenance line
- Mottos: Latin: Percussuri Vigiles (On the watch to strike)
- Colors: Cardinal Red
- Battle honours: Fortress Europe 1941–44; Dieppe, France and Germany 1944–45; Normandy 1944; Arnhem, Rhine, Biscay 1942–43

Commanders
- Current commander: LCol Sarah Lemay

Insignia
- Squadron Badge heraldry: Argent in front of two tomahawks in saltire; an eagle's head erased Gules langued Azure.

400 "City of Toronto" Tactical Helicopter and Training Squadron is part of 1 Wing, and as such a lodger unit of Canadian Forces Base Borden. The squadron operates the CH-146 Griffon.

== History ==
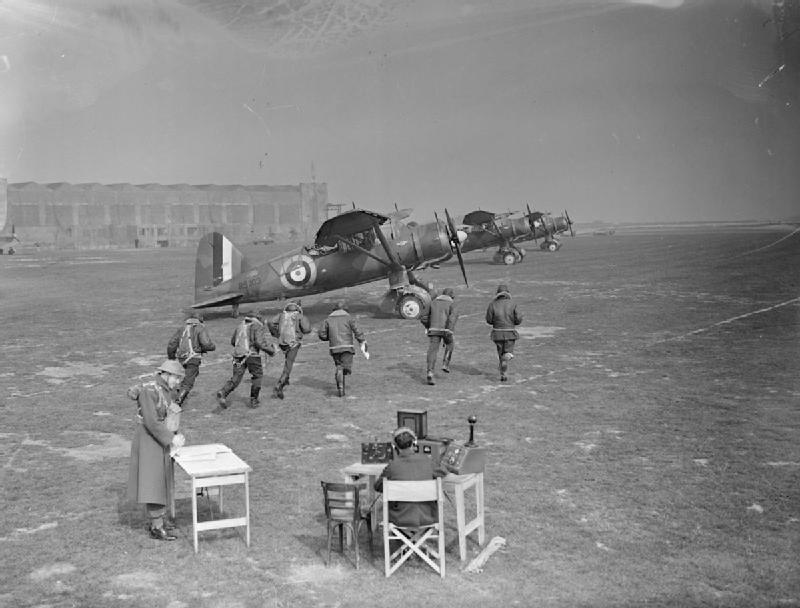
Crews of 400 Squadron run to their Westland Lysander aircraft during an exercise at RAF Odiham, England, 1941.

The squadron was formed as No. 10 Army Co-Operation Squadron at Toronto, Ontario on 5 October 1932, when it flew from the Trethewey Farm Airfield (De Lesseps Field) from 1934 to 1939. On 15 November 1937, it was renumbered No. 110 "City of Toronto" Army Co-Operation Squadron.

When the squadron was called out on active service 3 September 1939, it first deployed to CFB Rockcliffe (now Ottawa/Rockcliffe Airport), Ottawa, Ontario for conversion to the Westland Lysander aircraft. The new commanding officer (CO) at that time was Squadron Leader (S/L) Wilbur Dennison Van Vliet, an experienced peacetime flier. By early February 1940, the squadron was ready to depart to the United Kingdom, travelling by rail to Halifax, Nova Scotia and then by steamship across the Atlantic on 15 February. The squadron was the first Royal Canadian Air Force (RCAF) unit to go overseas and they were given an official send-off, in Ottawa, by the Prime Minister, William Lyon Mackenzie King and the Minister of National Defence, Ian Alistair Mackenzie. A year later, on 1 March 1941, it was re-designated as No. 400 Army Co-Operation Squadron in recognition of the fact it was the first squadron to deploy overseas. S/L Van Vliet returned to Canada, was promoted to group captain and died from a heart attack at age 39 in 1942 while serving as the Air Officer Commanding the Western Region of Canada, according to family legend in a training aircraft with a student at the controls. He is buried at Beechwood Cemetery in Ottawa.

During the war, it flew the Westland Lysander, Curtiss Tomahawk, North American Mustang, de Havilland Mosquito and Supermarine Spitfire primarily in the armed and unarmed reconnaissance role. Later in the war, the squadron also flew air interdiction operations. At the end of the war, 400 Squadron was disbanded on 7 August 1945, at the captured Lüneburg Airfield (Advanced Landing Ground B156) in western Germany.

No. 400 Squadron reformed at RCAF Station Downsview (now Downsview Airport), Toronto on 15 April 1946 as an Auxiliary Fighter-Bomber Squadron operating North American Harvard Mk IIBs commanded by S/L George William Gooderham, AFC. At the start of the Cold War the squadron flew the de Havilland Vampire Mk IIIs and then Canadair Sabre Mk.V aircraft. No. 400 "City of Toronto" (Fighter) Squadron, as part of 2 Air Reserve Wing, first flew Beechcraft Expeditor starting in 1958 and then the DHC-3 Otter in 1960. These aircraft were flown throughout the 1960s and 1970s.

Unification of the Canadian Armed Forces brought about another name change, this time to 400 "City of Toronto" Air Reserve Squadron. In 1980, the conversion to helicopters began with the CH-136 Kiowa. The squadron received its current name in the 1980s, becoming 400 Tactical Helicopter and Training Squadron. The squadron moved to CFB Borden in 1996 after the closure of CFB Downsview, and is now equipped with the CH-146 Griffon.

During peacetime, the squadron fulfills 1 Wing commitments by providing operational and training support to the 4th Canadian Division, the defence of Canadian sovereignty, support to national taskings, and support to peacekeeping operations. Its secondary duties are to support search and rescue operations of the Royal Canadian Air Force.

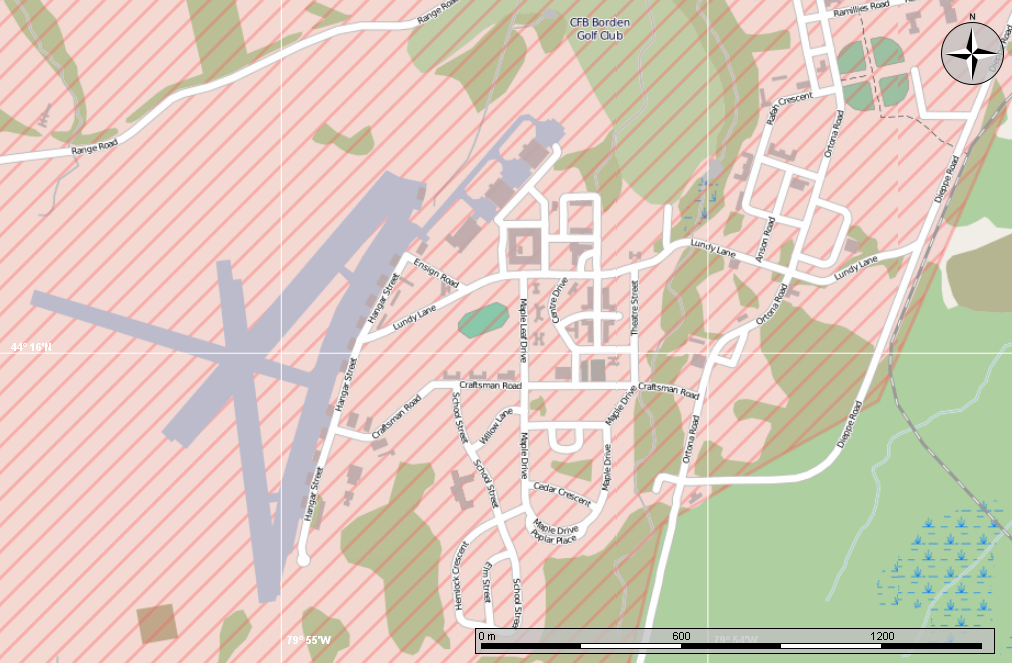
Map detail showing the airfield at CFB Borden.

In the unlikely event that the nation mobilizes for war, 400 Tactical Helicopter and Training Squadron will deploy all of its aviation assets, including support equipment, to augment 427 Special Operations Aviation Squadron at Garrison Petawawa. Those personnel remaining behind will form the core of a forces generation unit.

400 Tactical Helicopter and Training Squadron has an establishment of 237 personnel divided into six flights:

- 3 flying flights
- 1 maintenance flight
- 1 administrative support flight
- 1 squadron headquarters flight

The HQ Flight is a conglomeration of the Orderly Room, Finance Section, Medical Section and the 400 Squadron Pipes and Drums Band.
