= No. 168 Squadron RAF =

Defunct flying squadron of the Royal Air Force

- Active: 1942–1945
- Country: United Kingdom
- Branch: Royal Air Force
- Motto(s): Latin: Rerum Cognoscere Causas ("To know the causes of things")

No. 168 Squadron RAF was a Second World War Royal Air Force squadron that operated the North American Mustang on missions over occupied Europe and in support of the D-Day landings.

== History ==
The squadron was formed on 15 June 1942 at RAF Snailwell from parts of 268 Squadron. It was originally equipped with the American Curtiss Tomahawk II. It did not become operational until it moved to RAF Odiham and re-equipped the North American Mustang I. It soon began operations with photo reconnaissance sorties along the French coast (code named Popular) and Rhubarb sorties. It flew a variety of sorties for Army support and patrols and on the hunt for German fighter-bombers attacking towns. The main role which became more important from the end of 1943 was fighter reconnaissance both in preparation for the allied landings and later looking for V-1 sites.

It was busy on the lead-up to the D-day landings and moved to the beach head only three-weeks later. In July and August it flew over 500 sorties in support of the ground forces. In October 1944 it replaced the Mustangs with Hawker Typhoons and its role changed to offensive operations. The squadron operated in the ground-attack role ahead of the advancing troops using the Typhoon armed with rockets and bombs. The squadron ended up at Eindhoven in the Netherlands after many months of intensive operations, and was disbanded there on 26 February 1945.

== Aircraft operated ==
Dates	Aircraft	Variant	Notes
1942	Curtiss Tomahawk	II	Single-engined fighter
1942–1944	North American Mustang	I and IA	Single-engined fighter
1944–1945	Hawker Typhoon	IB	Single-engined fighter

=== Bibliography ===
- The Illustrated Encyclopedia of Aircraft (Part Work 1982–1985). Orbis Publishing. 1985.
- Jefford, C.G. (1988). RAF Squadrons. Airlife Publishing Ltd. ISBN 1-85310-053-6.
- Australian War Memorial article on RAAF Flight Lt Jack Stubbs of Canowindra, NSW
