= No. 184 Squadron RAF =

Defunct flying squadron of the Royal Air Force

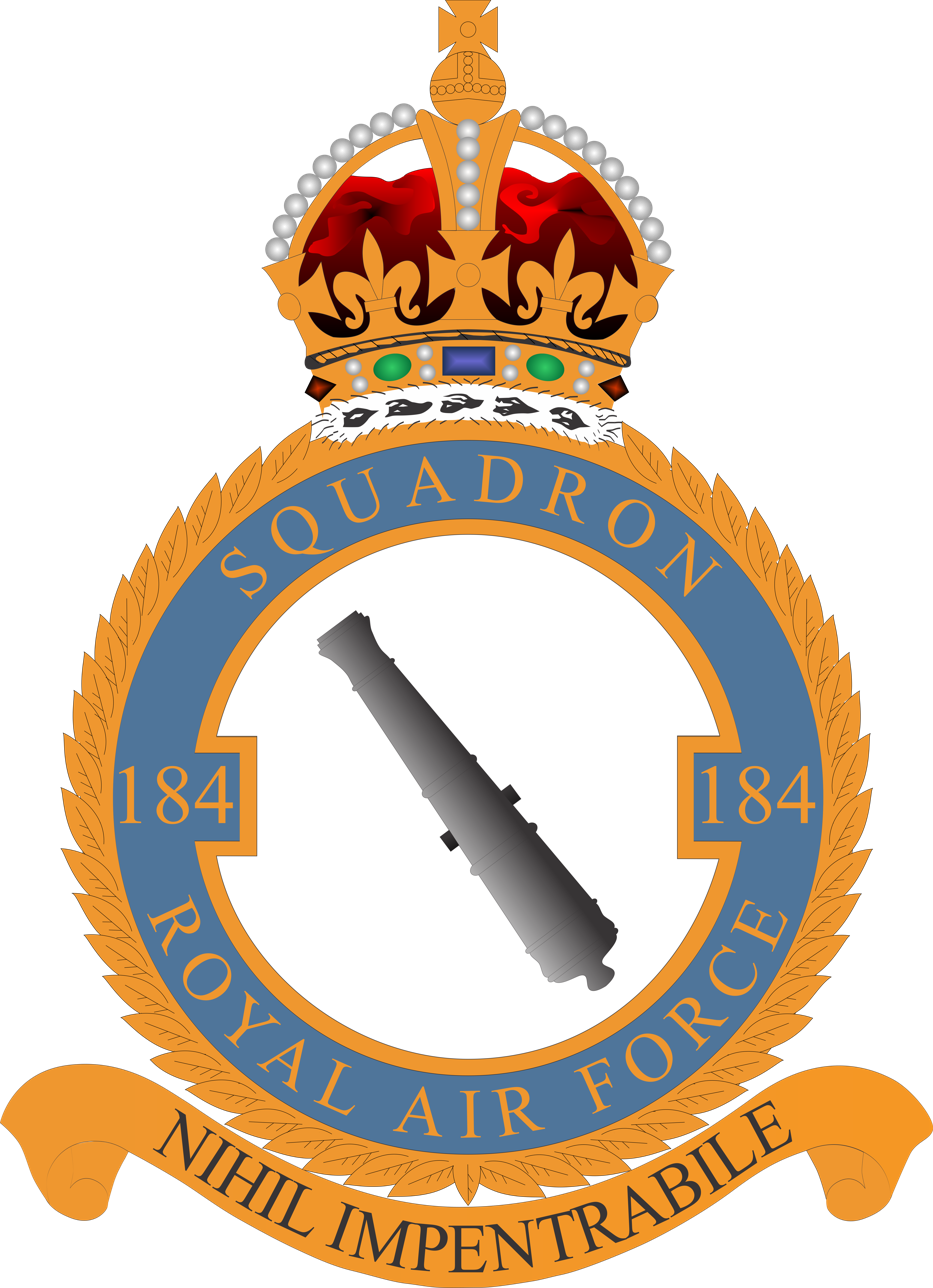
- Official Squadron badge
- Active: 1 December 1942 – 10 September 1945
- Country: United Kingdom
- Branch: Royal Air Force
- Mottos: Latin: Nihil impenetrabile ("Nothing impenetrable")

Insignia
- Squadron badge heraldry: A gun barrel in bend

No. 184 Squadron was a Royal Air Force squadron during the second world war.

== History ==
No.184 Squadron was formed at RAF Colerne on 1 December 1942, as a fighter-bomber unit equipped with Hawker Hurricane Mk.IID with 40mm anti-tank cannon. After a short time these were replaced by Hawker Hurricane Mk.IV allowing a variety of weapons to be fitted, including RP-3 60lb rockets. As part of 2nd TAF attacks on enemy shipping began on 17 June 1943.

In March 1944 the squadron re-equipped with Hawker Typhoon IB fighter-bombers and in preparation for the liberation of France these aircraft began a series of attacks on enemy communications. After D-day, on 27 June 1944, the squadron moved to Caen, Normandy, supporting the 21st Army Group throughout the battle of Normandy and the subsequent advance to the Netherlands. After spending the winter in the Netherlands, No.184 squadron moved to Germany on 21 March 1945, making them one of the first squadrons based on German soil during World War II.

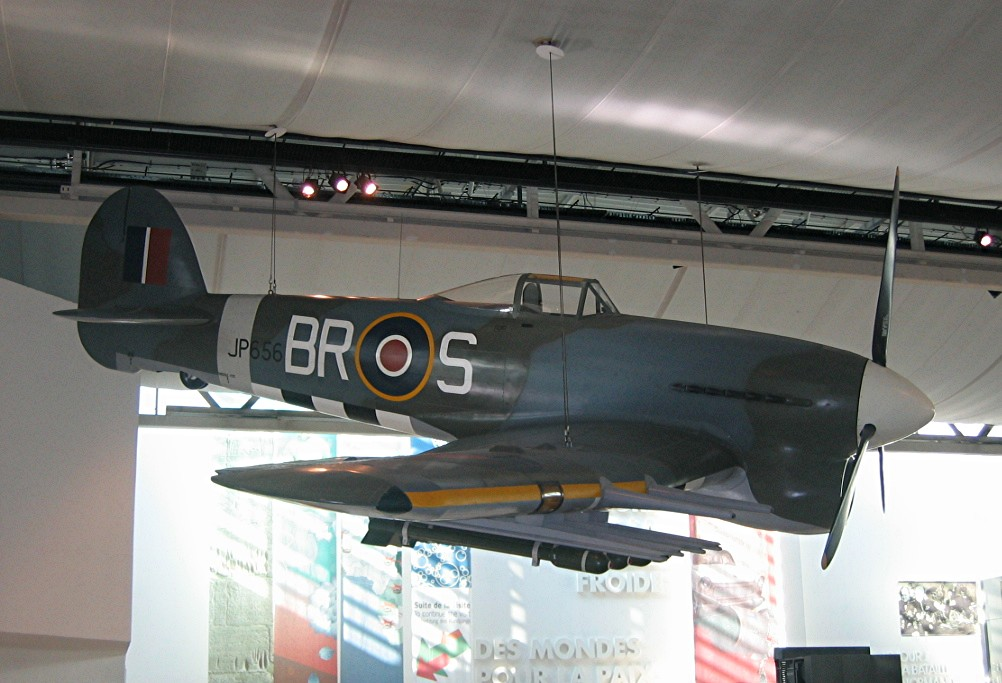
Hawker Typhoon replica in Caen Museum, painted in the markings of 184 Sqn

After hostilities ended, No.184 squadron was disbanded on 10 September 1945 at Flensberg in Germany.

== Notable Commanders ==
Squadron Leader Jack Rose DFC – pioneered the operational use of rocket projectiles fired from single-engined fighter bombers.

== Aircraft operated ==
Dates	Aircraft	Variant	Notes
1942–1943	Hawker Hurricane	IID	
1943–1944	Hawker Hurricane	IV	
1944–1945	Hawker Typhoon	IB	
