= No. 174 Squadron RAF =

Defunct flying squadron of the Royal Air Force

No. 174 (Mauritius) Squadron RAF
- Active: 3 March 1942 – 8 April 1945; 26 August 1945 – 6 September 1945; 9 September 1945 – 31 March 1946
- Country: United Kingdom
- Branch: Royal Air Force
- Nickname(s): Mauritius
- Motto(s): Attack

Insignia
- Squadron Badge: A springing winged Sambur deer
- Squadron codes: XP (March 1942 – April 1946)

No. 174 (Mauritius) Squadron RAF was a Royal Air Force Squadron that was a fighter-bomber unit in World War II.

== History ==
=== Formation in World War II ===
The squadron formed on 2 March 1942 at RAF Manston and equipped with Hurricanes and then rocket armed Typhoons in April 1943. They participated in the Dieppe Raid, and were involved in attacks on shipping and V-1 flying bomb launch sites from several bases in the UK. The squadron moved to Camilly, France after D-Day and then withdrew back to the UK, before joining the allied advance across Europe. The squadron disbanded in Germany on 8 April 1945 upon renumbering as No. 137 Squadron RAF, then reformed for two further brief periods and was equipped with Tempests in September 1945 before final disbandment on 31 March 1946 at Faßberg, Germany.

== Aircraft operated ==
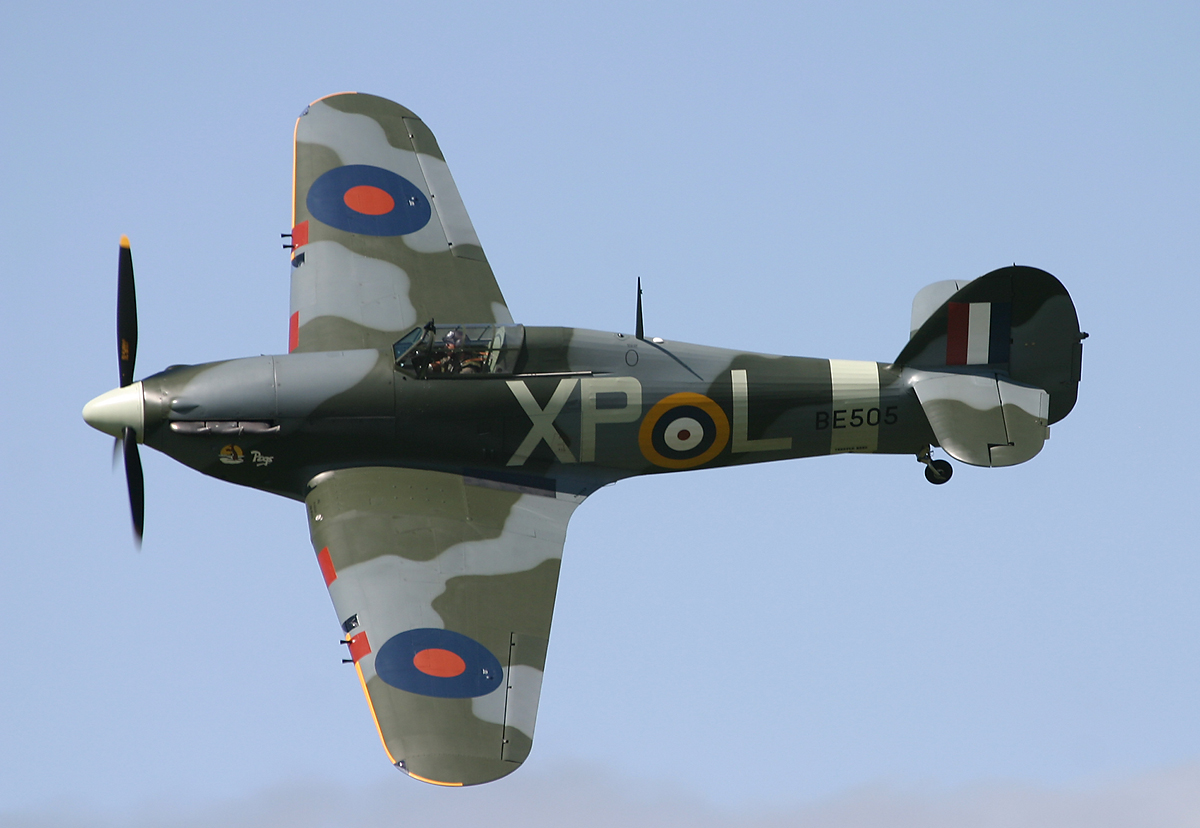
Hawker Hurricane IIB BE505 / XP-L in No. 174 Squadron RAF markings.

Aircraft operated by No. 174 Squadron RAF
From	To	Aircraft	Variant
Mar 1942	Apr 1943	Hawker Hurricane	IIB
Apr 1943	Apr 1945	Hawker Typhoon	IB
Aug 1945	Sep 1945	Hawker Typhoon	IB
Sep 1945	Apr 1946	Hawker Tempest	V
