= No. 181 Squadron RAF =

Defunct flying squadron of the Royal Air Force

- Active: 25 August 1942 – 30 September 1945
- Country: United Kingdom
- Branch: Royal Air Force
- Motto(s): Latin: Irruimus vastatum (We rush in and destroy)

Insignia
- Squadron Badge: An erased eagles head in front of two swords
- Squadron Code: EL (August 1942 – September 1945)

No. 181 Squadron RAF was a Royal Air Force Squadron formed as a fighter-bomber unit in World War II.

== History ==
=== Formation ===
The squadron formed on 25 August 1942 at RAF Duxford and was supplied with Hurricane and Typhoon aircraft. The squadron operated the Typhoons from several locations in the United Kingdom including RAF Appledram, RAF Snailwell, RAF Lasham, RAF Odiham and RAF Hurn. The squadron attacked V-1 flying bomb launch sites and supported the Normandy landings in June 1944, then moved to France where it followed the Allied advance across Europe, seeking targets of opportunity. The squadron disbanded at B 156/Lüneburg, Germany on 30 September 1945.

== Aircraft operated ==
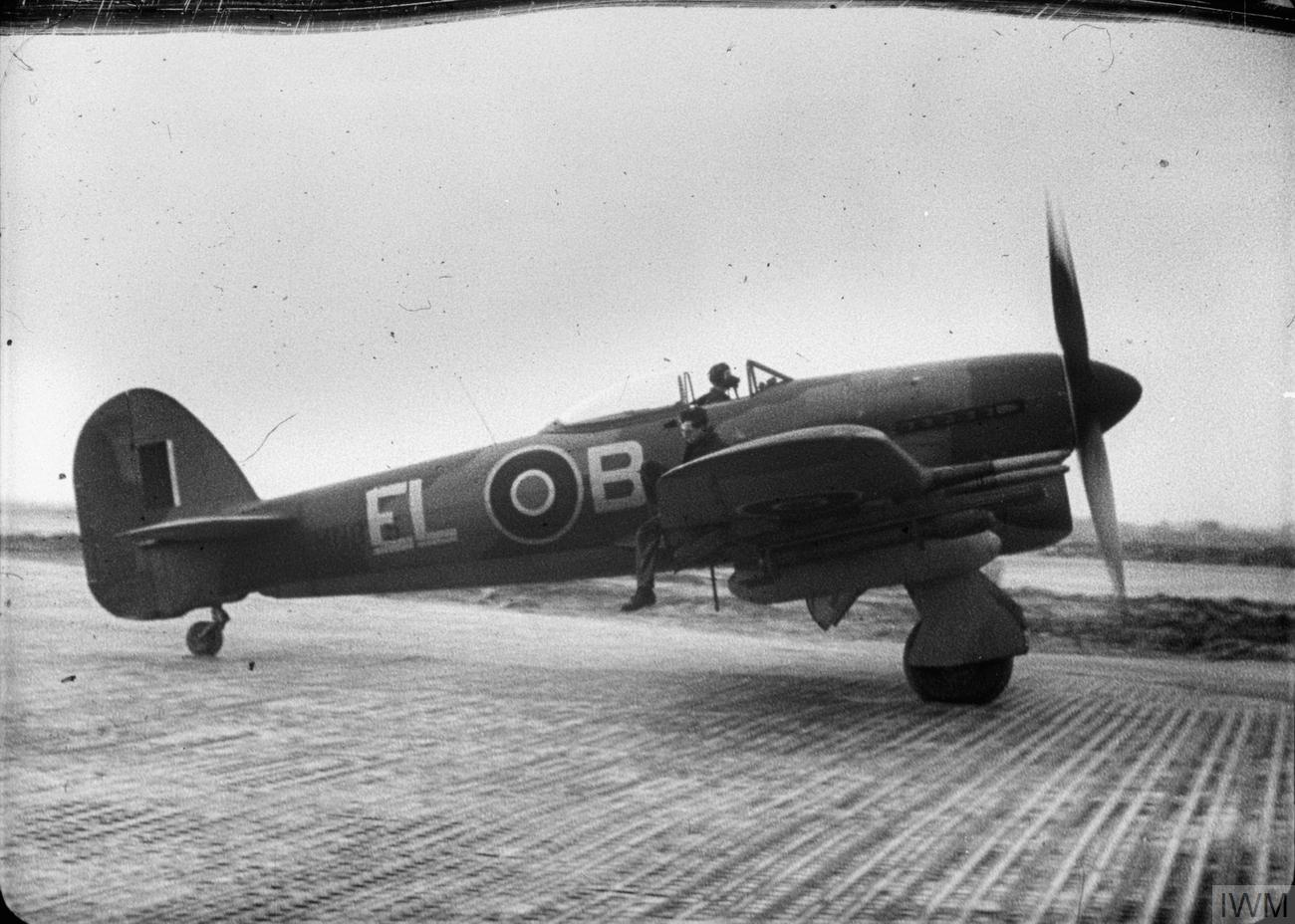
Hawker Typhoon Mk.Ib from 181 Sqn loaded with rocket projectiles and fuel tanks.

Aircraft operated by no. 181 Squadron RAF
From	To	Aircraft	Mk
Sep 1942	Dec 1942	Hawker Hurricane	I
Sep 1942	Dec 1942	Hawker Typhoon	IA
Sep 1942	Sep 1945	Hawker Typhoon	IB
