= No. 182 Squadron RAF =

Defunct flying squadron of the Royal Air Force

- Active: 25 August 1942 – 30 September 1945
- Country: United Kingdom
- Branch: Royal Air Force
- Motto: Fearless I direct my flight

Insignia
- Squadron Badge: A gauntlet holding a sword
- Squadron code: XM (August 1942 – September 1945)

No. 182 Squadron RAF was a Royal Air Force Squadron formed as a fighter-bomber unit in World War II.

== History ==
=== Formation in World War II ===
The squadron formed on 25 August 1942 at RAF Martlesham Heath and was supplied with Hurricanes and Typhoons. It then operated the Typhoons from several locations in the United Kingdom including RAF Snailwell, RAF Lasham, RAF Odiham and RAF Hurn. It attacked V-1 flying bomb launch sites and supported the Normandy landings in June 1944. It then relocated to France where it followed the allied advance across Europe seeking targets of opportunity. By 1 Jan 1945 the Squadron's Operational Record Book, Summary of Events, states that the Squadron was based at Zeelst/Helmond in Holland, followed by moves to Enschede in Holland, Rheine in Germany, Lüneburg Germany, Hannover Germany and finally Lübeck Germany all in the period 11 Apr-7 May. The Squadron was then moved to Kastrup in Denmark on 11 July, where it disbanded at on 30 September 1945.

== Aircraft operated ==
Aircraft operated by no. 182 Squadron RAF
From	To	Aircraft	Variant
Sep 1942	Oct 1942	Hawker Hurricane	I
Sep 1942	Jan 1943	Hawker Typhoon	IA
Sep 1942	Sep 1945	Hawker Typhoon	IB
