= No. 298 Squadron RAF =

Former flying squadron of the Royal Air Force

- Active: 24 Aug 1942 – 19 Oct 1942; 4 Nov 1943 – 21 Dec 1946
- Country: United Kingdom
- Branch: Royal Air Force
- Role: Special Operations; Transport
- Part of: No. 38 Group RAF
- Motto(s): Silent We Strike

Insignia
- Squadron Badge heraldry: A hand holding a dagger in bend sinister thrusting to the dexter
- Squadron Codes: 8A (May 1944 – Jun 1945; 'A' Flt); 8T (May 1944 – Jun 1945; 'B' Flt)

No. 298 Squadron was a Royal Air Force special operations squadron during the Second World War. Later in that war it changed to the transport role, disbanding after the end of the hostilities.

== History ==
=== Formation ===
No. 298 Squadron was formed on 24 August 1942 at RAF Thruxton from a nucleus of No. 297 Squadron as a special operations squadron, equipped with the Armstrong Whitworth Whitley. The squadron was however not required for operations, so the formation was suspended and the it was disbanded on 19 October 1942.

=== Gliders and Special Operations ===
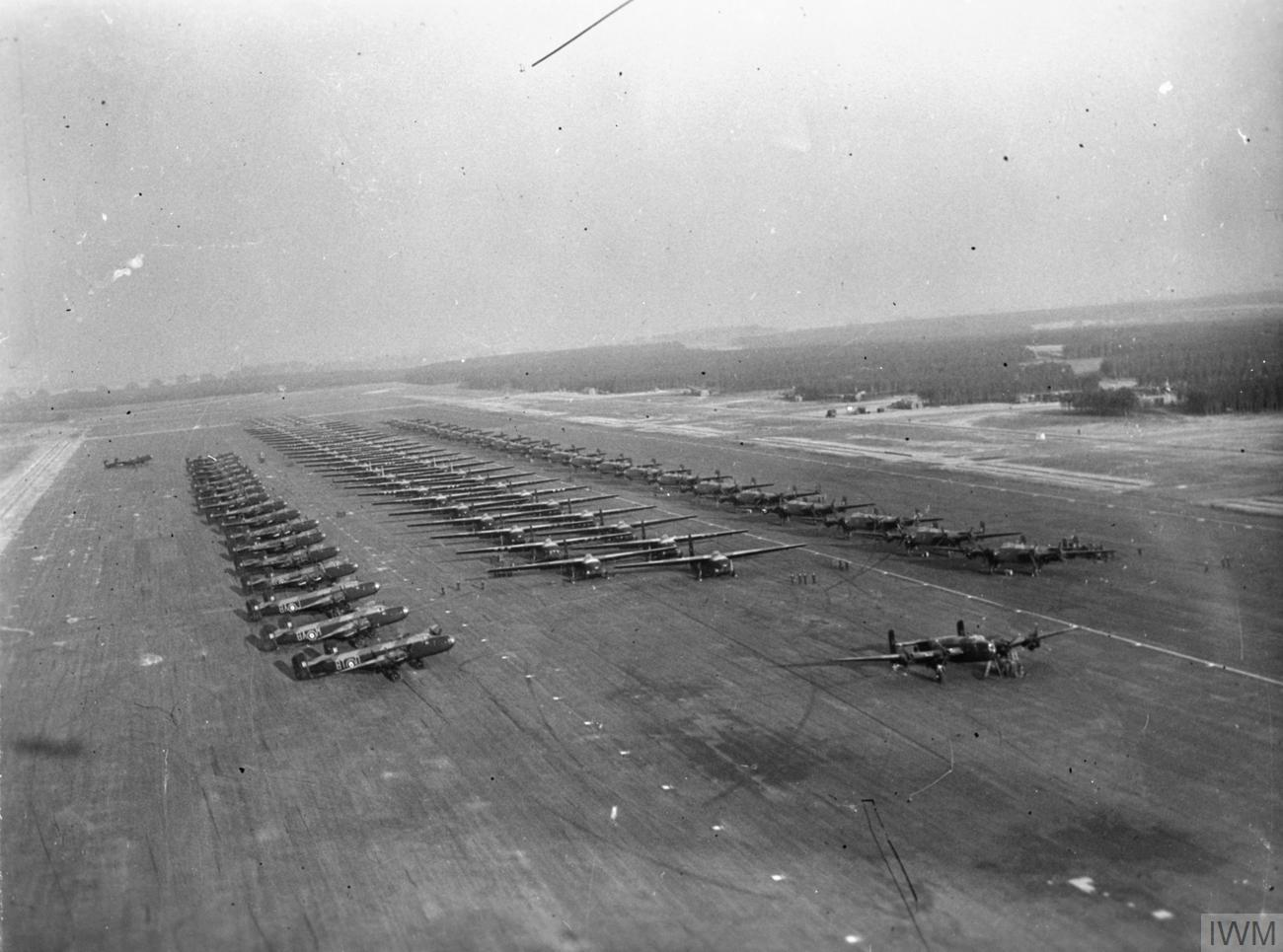
Operation Varsity. General Aircraft Hamilcars and Airspeed Horsas, flanked by Handley Page Halifax A Mark VII glider tugs of Nos. 298 and 644 Squadrons, lined up and ready for take-off at RAF Woodbridge, Suffolk, March 1945

The squadron was re-formed on 4 November 1943 at RAF Tarrant Rushton, from 'A' Flight of No. 295 Squadron, with the Handley Page Halifax. It trained to air-tow the big General Aircraft Hamilcar glider, but began operations in February 1944 in its original role, dropping SOE agents. On 16 March 1944 No. 298 Squadron's 'C' Flight was split off to form No. 644 Squadron.

During the Normandy landings, the squadron air-towed both the Airspeed Horsas and the Hamilcars to landing-zones around the beach head. An unusual operation involved parachuting jeeps which had been carried underneath the Halifax. The squadron then returned again to SOE duties. In between the SOE duties the squadron air-towed Hamilcar and Horsa gliders for the Arnhem landing (Operation Market Garden). The squadron moved in March 1945 to RAF Woodbridge, England to air-tow gliders for the Rhine crossing (Operation Varsity). After Operation Varsity the squadron flew normal supply and transport duties.

=== Transport in British India ===
In July 1945 the squadron moved to Raipur, British India to provide transport support to the Army. In March 1946 the squadron was involved in rice-dropping sorties from RAF Meiktila, Burma to the starving population in the jungle areas. The squadron disbanded at Mauripur, Sindh, British India (Now Pakistan Air Force Base Masroor) on 21 December or 30 December 1946.

== Aircraft operated ==
Aircraft operated by No. 298 Squadron
From	To	Aircraft	Version
August 1942	October 1942	Armstrong Whitworth Whitley	Mk.V
November 1943	November 1944	Handley Page Halifax	Mk.V
September 1944	July 1945	Handley Page Halifax	Mk.III
March 1945	December 1946	Handley Page Halifax	A.7

== Squadron bases ==
Bases and airfields used by No. 298 Squadron
From	To	Base	Remark
24 August 1942	19 October 1942	RAF Thruxton, Hampshire	
4 November 1943	21 March 1945	RAF Tarrant Rushton, Dorset	
21 March 1945	24 March 1945	RAF Woodbridge, Suffolk	
24 March 1945	5 July 1945	RAF Tarrant Rushton, Dorset	
5 July 1945	15 July 1945	en route to British India	
15 July 1945	9 December 1945	RAF Raipur, Chhattisgarh, British India	Dets. at RAF Akyab, Burma and RAF Alipore, Bengal, British India
9 December 1945	20 May 1946	RAF Digri, Sindh, British India	Dets. at RAF Negombo, Ceylon; RAF Meiktila, Burma and RAF Chaklala, Punjab, British India
20 May 1946	24 July 1946	RAF Baroda, Gujarat, British India	
24 July 1946	21 December 1946	RAF Mauripur, Sindh, British India	Det. at RAF Risalpur, North-West Frontier Province, British India

== Commanding officers ==
Officers commanding No. 298 Squadron
From	To	Name
24 August 1942	19 October 1942	S/Ldr. L.C. Bartram
4 November 1943	4 December 1943	S/Ldr. Geoffrey "Buster" Briggs
4 December 1943	January 1945	W/Cdr. D.H. Duder, DSO, DFC
January 1945	17 April 1945	W/Cdr. Law-Wright, DSC, DFC
17 April 1945	1945	W/Cdr. J. Stewart, DFC
1945	January 1946	W/Cdr. A.G. Norman, DFC
January 1946	21 December 1946	W/Cdr. W.G. Gardiner, DFC, AFC

== See also ==
- List of Royal Air Force aircraft squadrons
- Personal photographic archive of LAC Arthur Foster (1923-2010) Taken on tour in India https://www.flickr.com/photos/14415433@N02/albums/72157630237914772
