= Geoffrey Harry Briggs =

RAF Wing Commander (1918-2005)

Wing Commander Buster Briggs DFC
- Born: 22 March 1918; Oxford
- Died: 13 April 2005 (aged 87)

Wing Commander Geoffrey Harry Briggs (1918-2005) DFC, also known as Buster Briggs, was a Royal Air Force officer and High Sheriff of West Sussex.

== Education ==
Briggs was educated at Eton College.

== Career ==
In 1938 Briggs was commissioned into the Coldstream Guards, after training at Royal Military College, Sandhurst. The following year he was with the 1st Battalion as part of the British Expeditionary Force and was evacuated at Dunkirk.

In 1940 he joined the Royal Air Force after gaining his pilot's licence and previously being a member of the Household Brigade Flying Club as a glider pilot. His unit was re-designated No. 296 Squadron RAF in 1942 before Briggs joined No. 295 Squadron RAF and converted to the four-engine Halifax. He was made a flight commander on No. 298 Squadron RAF in 1943 and flew a Halifax aircraft that towed one of the six gliders who seized the Pegasus Bridge over the River Orne. He also towed gliders to Arnhem for Operation Market Garden, and following the death of the wing commander assumed command. He was awarded a DFC.

He later commanded No. 190 Squadron RAF before being invalided out of the service in July 1946 due to polio. He was appointed High Sheriff of West Sussex in 1974 and became a farmer.

== Interests ==
Briggs was a member of sailing clubs for 60 years.
