= No. 299 Squadron RAF =

Former flying squadron of the Royal Air Force

- Active: 4 Nov 1943 – 15 Feb 1946
- Country: United Kingdom
- Branch: Royal Air Force
- Role: Special Operations; Transport
- Part of: No. 38 Group RAF

Insignia
- Squadron Badge heraldry: No badge authorised
- Squadron Codes: X9 (Jan 1944 – Feb 1946); 5G (Jan 1944 – Feb 1946)

No. 299 Squadron was a Royal Air Force squadron during the Second World War and was part of No. 38 Group.

== History ==
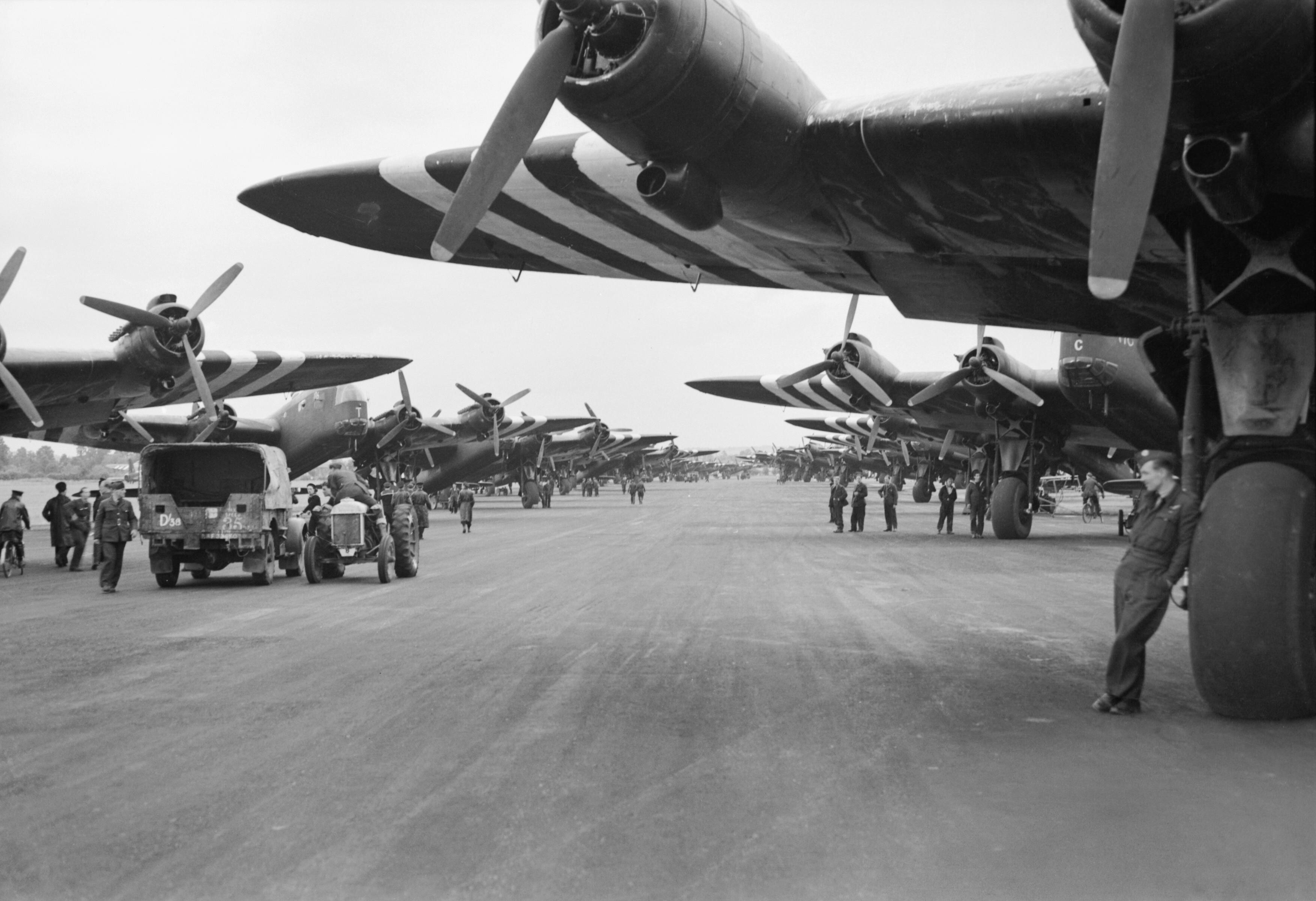
Short Stirlings of Nos. 196 and 299 Squadrons RAF lining the runway at RAF Keevil on the evening of 5 June 1944 before emplaning paratroops of the 5th Parachute Brigade Group for the invasion of Normandy

No. 299 Squadron was formed on 4 November 1943 from 'C' flight of No. 297 Squadron at RAF Stoney Cross, Hampshire as a special operations squadron. It became operational in April 1944 dropping SOE agents. During the Normandy landing the squadron first delivered paratroopers, and then returned to air-tow 16 Airspeed Horsa gliders across the English Channel. The squadron continued operations with resupply drops until 10 June when it returned to SOE duties.

In between the SOE duties the squadron air-towed Horsa gliders for the Arnhem landing (Operation Market Garden), and the Rhine crossing (Operation Varsity). It was also involved in supply-dropping to resistance forces in Norway until the end of the war. On 7 October 1945, it lost five of its members in the crash of a Short Stirling IV in Rennes in Brittany. At the end of the Second World War the squadron disbanded at RAF Shepherds Grove, Suffolk on 15 February 1946.

== Aircraft operated ==
Aircraft operated by No. 299 Squadron
From	To	Aircraft	Version
November 1943	January 1944	Lockheed Ventura	Mks.I and II
January 1944	February 1946	Short Stirling	Mk.IV
January 1945	February 1946	Short Stirling	Mk.V

== Squadron bases ==
Bases and airfields used by No. 299 Squadron
From	To	Base
4 November 1943	15 March 1944	RAF Stoney Cross, Hampshire
15 March 1944	9 October 1944	RAF Keevil, Wiltshire
9 October 1944	25 January 1945	RAF Wethersfield, Essex
25 January 1945	15 February 1946	RAF Shepherds Grove, Suffolk

== Commanding officers ==
Officers commanding No. 299 Squadron
From	To	Name
4 November 1943	28 December 1943	W/Cdr. R.W.G. Kitley
28 December 1943	19 September 1944	W/Cdr. P.B.N. Davis, DSO
19 September 1944	1 November 1944	W/Cdr. P.N. Jennings (acting after KIA of W/Cdr. Davis over Arnhem)
1 November 1944	31 December 1944	W/Cdr. C.B.R. Colenso, DFC
31 December 1944	September 1945	W/Cdr. P.N. Jennings
September 1945	15 February 1946	W/Cdr. R.N. Stidolph

== See also ==
- No. 38 Group RAF
- List of Royal Air Force aircraft squadrons
