= James Scarlett-Streatfeild =

Royal Air Force Air Vice-Marshal (1909-1945)

- Born: 17 February 1909; Southsea, Hampshire, England
- Died: 10 May 1945 (aged 36); Oslo, Norway
- Burial place: Oslo Western Cemetery
- Military career
- Allegiance: United Kingdom
- Branch: Royal Air Force
- Service years: 1927–1945
- Rank: Air Vice Marshal
- Service number: 26093
- Commands: No. 38 Group RAF (1944–45); No. 203 Squadron RAF (1939–41)
- Conflicts: Second World War
- Awards: Commander of the Order of the British Empire; Mentioned in Despatches; Officer of the Legion of Merit (United States)

Air Vice Marshal James Rowland Scarlett-Streatfeild, CBE (17 February 1909 – 10 May 1945) was a senior commander in the Royal Air Force during the Second World War. He was killed in an air crash as he travelled to accept the surrender of German forces in Norway.

== Early life ==
James Rowland Scarlett was born at Southsea, Hampshire, one of the sons of Air Vice Marshal Francis Scarlett and Dora Scarlett (née Blakiston-Houston). His father was an early naval aviator and his grandfather had been colonel of the 5th Dragoon Guards. He was a member of the Streatfeild family of Rossington Hall, Bawtry, and added the Streatfeild to his own name in 1939.

== RAF career ==
Scarlett joined the Royal Air Force in 1927 as a flight cadet in "B" Squadron, Royal Air Force College Cranwell and on 15 December 1928 was commissioned pilot officer with service number 26093, and posted to the staff at RAF Calshot a flying boat base, commencing his training on the "flying boat course" on 5 March 1929 preliminary to becoming a permanent member of staff and pilot at RAF Calshot. He was promoted flying officer on 15 June 1930.

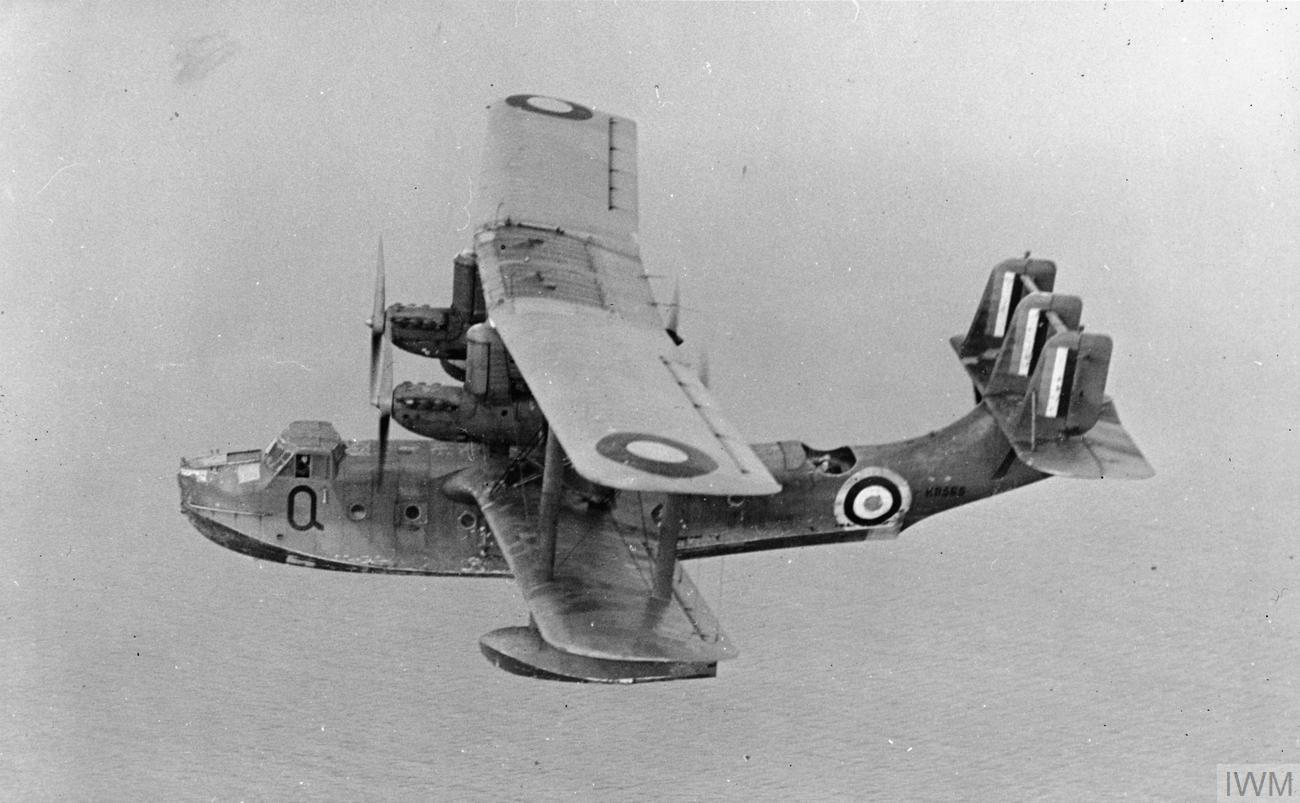
Scarlett flew Short Singapores in 1939, like the one shown here

On 26 March 1934 Scarlett joined RAF Donibristle as Navigation Officer being promoted flight lieutenant on 1 August 1934, and on 29 December 1936 was appointed Navigation Officer at Headquarters No. 17 Group RAF tasked with reconnaissance. On 1 October 1937 he was promoted squadron leader, and transferred to HQ No. 16 Group RAF in the same capacity and on 23 March 1939 joined No. 203 Squadron RAF flying Short Singapore Mark III flying boats over the Red Sea from Basra as navigation leader. It was announced in the London Gazette in March 1939 that he had added "Streatfeild" to his surname. He survived a serious air crash on 8 August 1939 at Aboukir in Egypt, he was amongst the injured.

=== Second World War ===
Scarlett-Streatfeild took command of No. 203 Squadron RAF in October 1939 shortly after its arrival in Aden to convert from flying boats to twin engine Bristol Blenheim Mark I and IV's in which it flew reconnaissance and fighter patrols over the Red Sea and in action with the Italian Air Force after Italy entered the war in June 1940. On 1 June 1940 he was promoted temporary wing commander. Scarlett-Streatfeild was transferred in June 1941 when the squadron was posted to Egypt and Palestine, he became senior air staff officer No. 201 Group RAF Naval Co-Operation under Air Vice Marshal Leonard Slatter and later Air Vice Marshal Hugh Lloyd eventually being promoted to acting Air Officer Commanding No. 201 Group RAF himself. Already an acting group captain he was made temporary group captain on 11 October 1942.

During the North African Campaign in 1942, the successful coordination of No. 201 (Naval Co-operation) Group under Slatter and Lloyd with No. 205 (Heavy Bomber) Group under Air Commodores Lachlan L. MacLean and Alan P. Ritchie, and Air Headquarters (H.Q.) Western Desert under Air Vice Marshal Arthur Coningham, provided the practical model upon which British Prime Minister Winston Churchill, American President Franklin D. Roosevelt, and their staffs reorganized the Allied air forces in the North African and Mediterranean Theater of Operations (MTO) at the Casablanca Conference in January 1943. The result of this reorganization was the Mediterranean Air Command commanded by Air Chief Marshal Sir Arthur Tedder and its major sub-command, the Northwest African Air Forces (NAAF) under Lieutenant General Carl Spaatz, was structured according to the tri-force model.

The air interdiction model consisting of coastal, strategic, and tactical air forces was presented to the Casablanca planners by Tedder who along with primarily Lloyd, Ritchie, and especially Coningham, implemented and developed the model during the successful campaigns in Egypt and Libya.

In recognition of the part which he had played, Scarlett-Streatfeild was appointed a Commander of the Order of the British Empire on 1 January 1943, and appointed acting air commodore on 27 February 1943. He was also Mentioned in Despatches in the London Gazette on 2 June 1943.
On 29 March 1943 Scarlett-Streatfeild was appointed senior air staff officer to HQ North-West African Coastal Force, being formally promoted group captain on 27 August 1943, and then on 28 March 1944 becoming senior air staff officer HQ No. 15 Group RAF a coastal reconnaissance group with embedded Naval units and personnel.

Scarlett-Streatfeild headed the enquiry into the death of Air Chief Marshal Sir Trafford Leigh-Mallory in an aircrash in November 1944. The situation was very similar to the crash in which he would himself be killed. In appreciation of his work with US forces he was decorated by the United States as an Officer of the Legion of Merit (Officer) on 26 September 1944.

Scarlett-Streatfeild was appointed Air Officer Commanding No. 38 Group RAF on 18 October 1944 being promoted acting air vice marshal on 18 October 1944. The group had ferried airborne troops in Operation Market Garden the Arnhem mission and required reorganization to ready it for the next major airborne operation; the Group Headquarters moved immediately to Marks Hall, Essex and the squadrons were redeployed to RAF Earls Colne (296 and 297), RAF Rivenhall (295 and 570), RAF Great Dunmow (190 and 620), RAF Wethersfield (later to RAF Shepherds Grove) (196 and 299) and RAF Woodbridge (298 and 644). 190 Squadron remained temporarily at RAF Fairford. On 10 March 1945 No. 161 Squadron RAF the SOE special duties unit at RAF Tempsford also came under No. 38 Group RAF control. On 24 March 1945 the squadrons were fully employed in delivering airborne troops to the far bank of the Rhine as part of Operation Varsity, an operation which proved costly in terms of aircrew lives lost.

== Death in an air crash ==
When the German forces capitulated in May 1945 Scarlett-Streatfeild was given the honour of accepting their surrender in Norway. With his Norwegian liaison officer Major Petter Cato Juliebø, he took off from RAF Great Dunmow at 0355 hours flying to Oslo aboard Short Stirling Mark IV (serial number "LK297") of No. 190 Squadron RAF on 10 May 1945 his aircraft disappeared without trace in extremely bad weather conditions. On 21 June 1945 the wreckage of his aircraft, the remains of its crew, AVM Scarlett-Streatfeild and the paratroopers accompanying him was located at Andtjernåsen in the hills near Oslo, it had crashed into the hillside and exploded. All of the casualties were buried in Oslo Western Civil Cemetery.

In his will Scarlett-Streatfeild left the sum of £75,000.00 to his brother.

== Bibliography ==
- Winston G. Ramsey (1985). "After The Battle, No. 50". After the Battle. Battle of Britain Prints. ISSN 0306-154X.
- Tom Docherty (2007). Dinghy Drop – No. 279 Squadron. Pen and Sword. ISBN 978-1844154821.

Military offices
| Preceded by Leslie Hollinghurst | Air Officer Commanding No. 38 Group; 1944–1945 | Succeeded by Ronald Ivelaw-Chapman |
