= James Scarlett =

James Scarlett may refer to:

- Sir James Yorke Scarlett (1799–1871), British soldier and hero of the Crimean War
- James Scarlett, 1st Baron Abinger (1769–1844), English lawyer, politician and judge
- James Scarlett-Streatfeild (1909–1945), Royal Air Force squadron commander
- James Scarlett, 4th Baron Abinger (1871–1903), British peer
- James Scarlett, 8th Baron Abinger (1914–2002), British peer
