= No. 644 Squadron RAF =

- Active: 23 Feb 1944 – 1 Sep 1946
- Country: United Kingdom
- Branch: Royal Air Force
- Type: Inactive
- Role: Airborne Assault; SOE Supply; Transport
- Part of: No. 38 Group RAF
- Mottos: Latin: Dentes draconis serimus (Translation: "We sow the dragon's teeth")

Insignia
- Squadron Badge heraldry: In front of an increscent, a Pegasus rampant The Pegasus signifies the Squadron's association with the Parachute Brigade
- Squadron Codes: 2P (Feb 1944 – Sep 1946); 9U (Feb 1944 – Sep 1946)

Aircraft flown
- Transport: Handley Page Halifax; Converted four-engined heavy bomber

No. 644 Squadron RAF was a unit in 38 Group of the Royal Air Force during World War II which undertook glider-towing and supply dropping missions as well being employed in the paratroop role.

== History ==
=== Formation and World War II ===
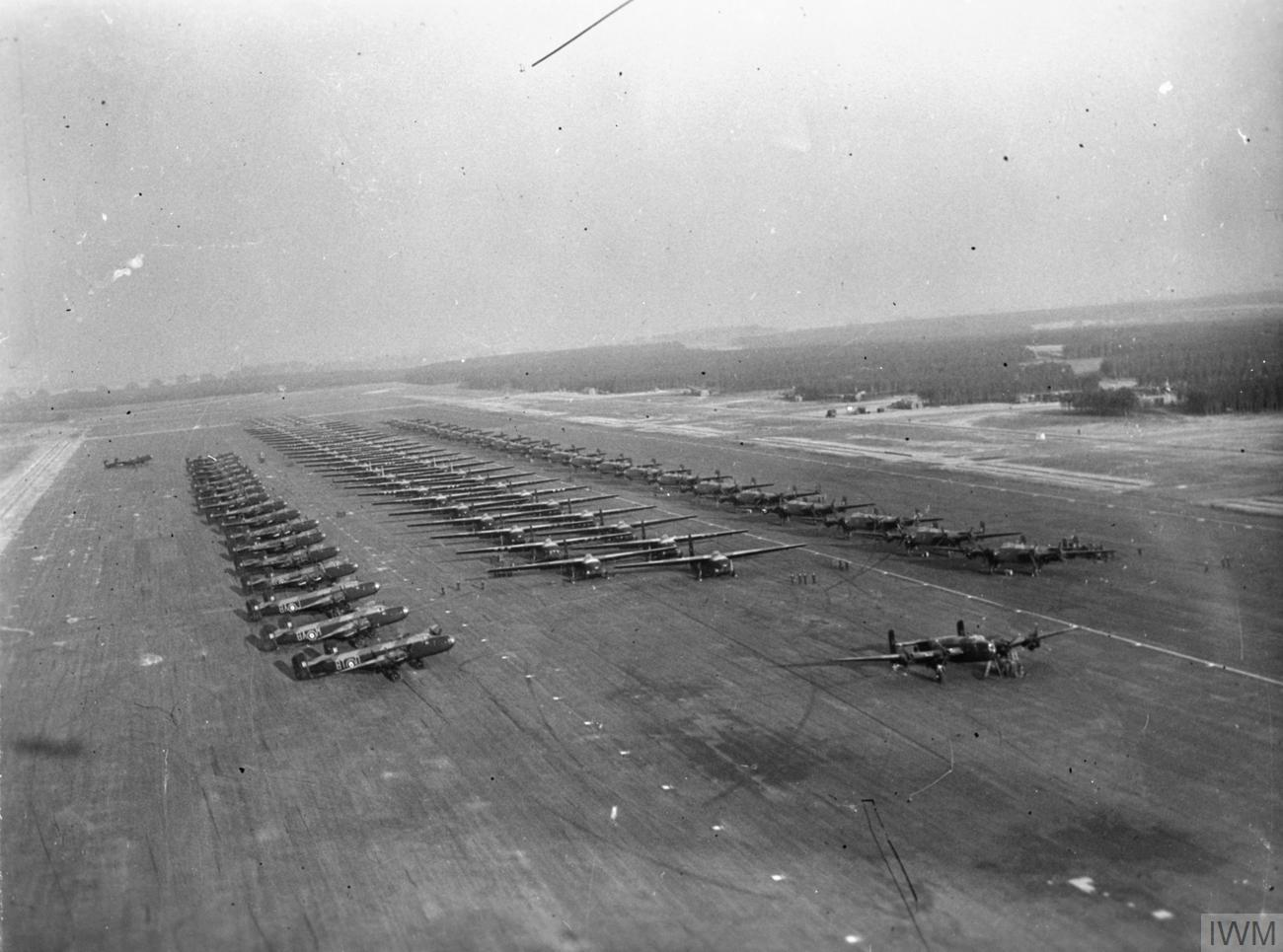
Operation Varsity. General Aircraft Hamilcars and Airspeed Horsas, flanked by Handley Page Halifax A Mark VII glider tugs of Nos. 298 and 644 Squadrons RAF, lined up and ready for take-off at RAF Woodbridge, Suffolk, March 1945

When the buildup for Operation Overlord got under way, an increasing need for transport and airborne assault squadrons became apparent. Therefore, personnel and aircraft from No. 298 Squadron RAF at RAF Tarrant Rushton were formed into No. 644 Squadron on 23 February 1944 as part of No. 38 Group RAF. Operations also included supply dropping to SOE forces and glider towing during the operations Overlord, Market Garden and Varsity. They also carried out supply drops over Norway and even some tactical night-bombing missions towards the end of the war.

=== Post war ===
Following the end of hostilities in Europe, 644 Squadron helped to transport the 1st Parachute Brigade to Copenhagen on 8 May, where they were to oversee the surrender and disarmament of the German forces in Denmark. On the following day they carried the remainder of the 1st Airborne Division to Norway for similar duties. Ever since the Normandy invasion, No. 46 Group RAF had been involved in a "shuttle service" of ferrying freight to the front line and removing either wounded or freed prisoners of war to Britain. Although most of the armies were more or less static now that the War was over, RAF Transport Command's responsibilities increased, and so No. 38 Group RAF received orders to assist in this capacity. In addition to the transport of freight and prisoners of war, No. 644 Squadron also flew service personnel to Greece, North Africa and Italy. In July, the Squadron lost a Halifax over the Pyrenees. In November 1945, the 6th Airborne Division was despatched to Palestine as a quick reaction peace keeping force for the British Empire, and 644 Squadron were ordered to lend them their support and so accompanied them to RAF Qastina in Palestine (now Hatzor Airbase). On 1 September 1946 No. 644 squadron disbanded by being re-numbered to No. 47 Squadron RAF.

== Present ==
The squadron today is represented by No. 644 Volunteer Gliding Squadron, which has the same squadron badge though with a different motto.

== Aircraft operated ==
Aircraft operated by No. 644 Squadron
From	To	Aircraft	Version
February 1944	November 1944	Handley Page Halifax	Mk.V
August 1944	March 1945	Handley Page Halifax	Mk.IIIa
March 1945	September 1946	Handley Page Halifax	Mk.VII
August 1946	September 1946	Handley Page Halifax	Mk.IX

== Squadron bases ==
Bases and airfields used by No. 644 Squadron RAF
From	To	Base
23 February 1944	1 December 1945	RAF Tarrant Rushton, Dorset
1 December 1945	1 September 1946	RAF Qastina, Palestine

== Commanding officers ==
Officers Commanding No. 644 Squadron
From	To	Name
23 February 1944	16 March 1944	S/Ldr. A.G. Norman, DFC
16 March 1944	10 November 1944	W/Cdr. V.A. Pope
10 November 1944	25 June 1945	W/Cdr. E.L. Archer, AFC
25 June 1945	1 September 1946	W/Cdr. W.H. Ingle AFC

== In popular culture ==
- In the DreamWorks animated movie Chicken Run, Fowler reveals that he was a mascot for the 644 Squadron.
- In the war movie The Forgotten Battle, the route for 644 squadron in Operation Market Garden is shown in the map during the briefing given to aircrews.
