= No. 1311 Flight RAF =

- Active: 19 April 1944 – 21 July 1944; 1 September 1953 – 15 February 1954
- Role: Transport
- Garrison/HQ: RAF Llandow; RAF Thruxton; RAF Seletar; Noble Field, Malaya
- Equipment: Avro Anson I Auster VI; Scottish Aviation Pioneer CC.1]

No. 1311 (Transport) Flight was first formed at RAF Llandow on 10 April 1944, equipped with Avro Anson I transport aircraft. The flight was disbanded on 21 July 1944 at RAF Thruxton, absorbed by No. 84 Group RAF's Support Unit.

1311 Flight was re-formed at RAF Seletar with Auster VI and Pioneer CC.1 liaison aircraft, and dis-banded at Noble Field, Malaya, on 15 February 1954, to become the Supply Flight of No. 267 Squadron RAF.

== Representative Aircraft ==
- Anson I - MG471
- Anson X - NK658
- Auster VI - TW535
- Pioneer CC.1 - XE512

== Bibliography ==
- Lake, A (1999). Flying units of the RAF. Shrewsbury: Airlife. ISBN 1-84037-086-6.
