= No. 620 Squadron RAF =

Defunct flying squadron of the Royal Air Force

No 620 Squadron RAF
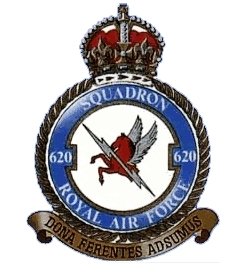
- Official Squadron badge of No 620 Squadron RAF
- Active: 17 June 1943 – 1 September 1946
- Country: United Kingdom
- Branch: Royal Air Force
- Type: Flying squadron
- Role: Bomber; Airborne forces Transport
- Part of: No. 3 Group RAF, Bomber Command; No 38 Group RAF, Fighter Command; No 38 Group RAF, Transport Command
- Mottos: Latin: Dona ferentes adsumus (Translation: "We are coming bringing gifts")

Insignia
- Squadron Badge heraldry: In front of a demi-pegasus couped, a flash of lightning
- Squadron Codes: QS (Jun 1943 – 1946); D4 (Nov 1943 – 1946)

No 620 Squadron was a squadron of the Royal Air Force during World War II. During its existence it served as a bomber squadron, airborne forces and a transport squadron.

== History ==
No. 620 Squadron was formed at RAF Chedburgh on 17 June 1943 as a heavy bomber squadron equipped with the Short Stirling. It was a part of No.3 Group of RAF Bomber Command and carried out night bombing and minelaying missions until November 1943, when it was transferred to No 38 Group RAF. The squadron flew 61 operations while part of Bomber Command, losing 17 Stirlings in the process. The squadron moved to RAF Leicester East on 27 November 1943 in preparation for airborne forces operations. By March 1944 the squadron had been moved to RAF Fairford to prepare for D-Day and completed many practice missions in Gloucestershire area such a parachuting and glider towing.

On D-Day itself, the squadron took part in Operation Tonga and dropped paratroopers of the 6th Airborne Division near Caen. After these events, the squadron was used to resupply Allied forces in France, mainly SOE and the French Resistance. No 620 Squadron also took part in Operation Market Garden, where they towed gliders and dropped paratroopers belonging to the 1st Airborne Division. They also flew operations to resupply the struggling ground forces in and around Arnhem. After these operations, the squadron flew some missions in support of the resistance in the Netherlands and in Norway.

Throughout Operation Varsity in March 1945, the squadron towed 30 gliders, carrying anti-tank and artillery weapons to their destination near the Rhine.

After VE Day, the squadron helped to transport ex-POWs, troops, and supplies around Europe. The Stirlings, which they had used throughout the war, began to be replaced in May 1945 by Halifaxes, and the sphere of operations was changed from Western-Europe to Greece, Czechoslovakia, Egypt, Italy, and Palestine. In December 1945, the squadron was moved to Tunisia and shortly thereafter to Palestine and Egypt, and the squadron began missions in the Middle East. By June 1946, it received also some Dakotas, but on 1 September 1946, the squadron was disbanded at RAF Aqir, Palestine by being renumbered to No. 113 Squadron RAF.

== Aircraft operated ==
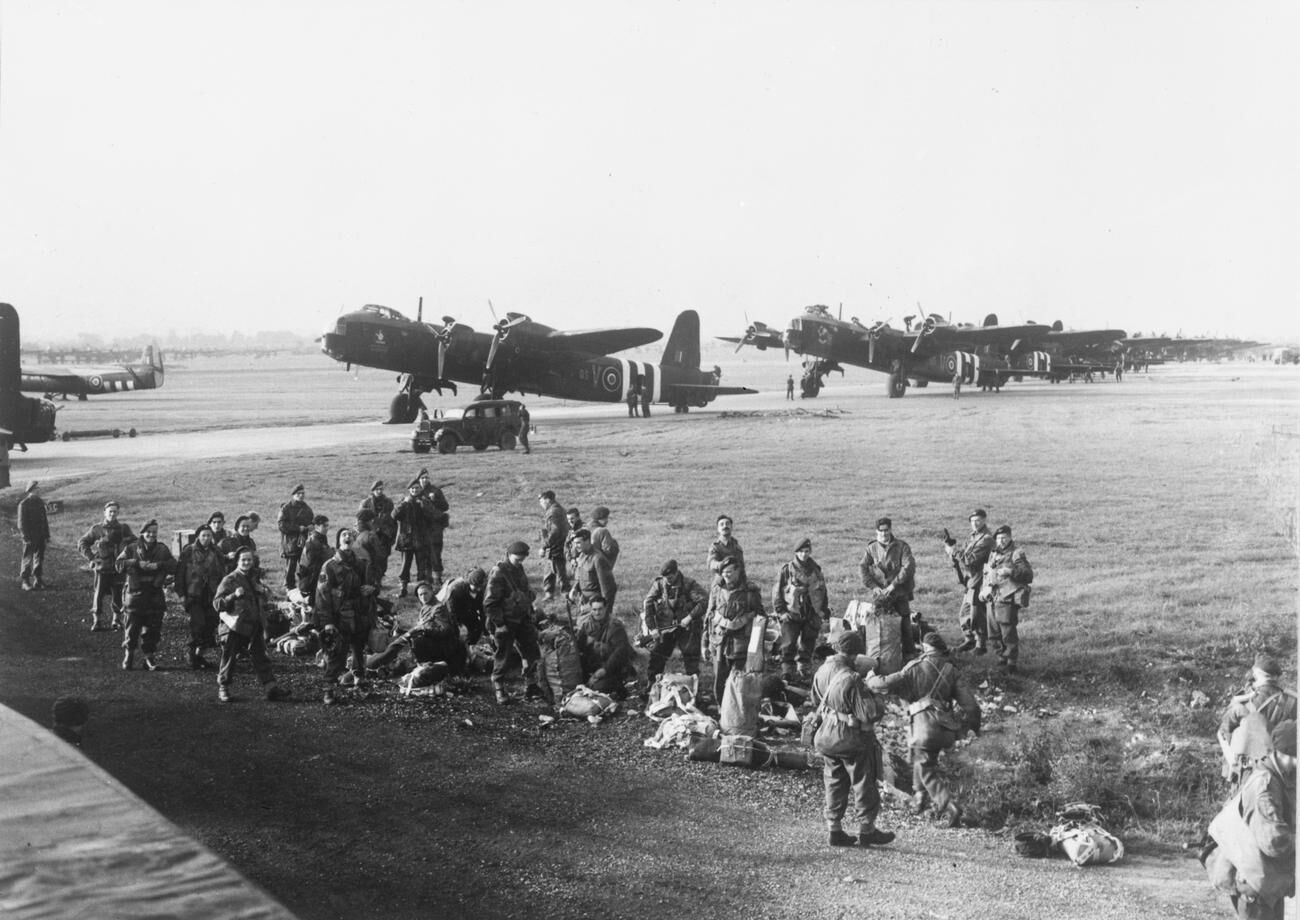
Stirling Mk.IVs of 620 Squadron, RAF during Operation Market Garden in September 1944

Aircraft operated by No. 620 Squadron RAF
From	To	Aircraft	Version
June 1943	August 1943	Short Stirling	Mk.I
August 1943	February 1944	Short Stirling	Mk.III
February 1944	July 1945	Short Stirling	Mk.IV
May 1945	September 1946	Handley Page Halifax	Mks.III, VII
June 1946	September 1946	Douglas Dakota	C.4
August 1946	September 1946	Handley Page Halifax	A.9

== Squadron Stations ==
Stations and airfields used by No. 620 Squadron RAF
From	To	Station	Remark
17 June 1943	23 November 1943	RAF Chedburgh, Suffolk	
23 November 1943	18 March 1944	RAF Leicester East, Leicestershire	Det. at RAF Hurn, Dorset
18 March 1944	17 October 1944	RAF Fairford, Gloucestershire	
17 October 1944	December 1945	RAF Great Dunmow, Essex	
December 1945	15 January 1946	El Aouina, Tunisia	
15 January 1946	6 March 1946	RAF Aqir, Palestine	
6 March 1946	14 June 1946	RAF Cairo West, Egypt	Det. at RAF Shallufa, Egypt, Apr–Jun 46
14 June 1946	1 September 1946	RAF Aqir, Palestine	

== Commanding officers ==
Officers commanding No. 620 Squadron RAF
From	To	Name
17 June 1943	4 October 1944	W/Cdr. D.H. Lee, DFC
4 October 1944	1 July 1945	W/Cdr. G.T. Wynne-Powell, DFC
1 July 1945	27 July 1945	W/Cdr. G.H. Briggs, DFC
27 July 1945	September 1945	W/Cdr. K.R. Slater, AFC
September 1945	1946	W/Cdr. R.I. Alexander, DFC
1946	September 1946	W/Cdr. M. Thomas

== See also ==
- No 38 Group RAF
- List of Royal Air Force aircraft squadrons
