= No. 570 Squadron RAF =

- Active: 15 November 1943 – 8 January 1946
- Country: United Kingdom
- Branch: Royal Air Force
- Role: Airborne squadron Bomber support Special operations
- Part of: No. 38 Group RAF
- Motto(s): Latin: Impetum deducimus (Translation: "We launch the spearhead")

Insignia
- Squadron Badge heraldry: A winged chariot
- Squadron Codes: V8 (Nov 1943 – Jan 1946); E7 (May 1944 – Jan 1946)

No. 570 Squadron RAF was a bomber unit active within No. 38 Group RAF as an airborne, bomber support and special operations squadron during World War II.

== History ==
No. 570 Squadron was formed at RAF Hurn on 15 November 1943, equipped with Armstrong Whitworth Albemarles. It was part of No. 38 Group RAF and was engaged in supply dropping missions to French resistance units when it was not training paratroops and glider-towing.

In July 1944 the squadron re-equipped with Short Stirlings, and in September 1944 participated in Operation Market Garden, the ill-fated attempt by the allies to capture the Arnhem bridge, during which time the squadron was engaged in glider towing and supply drops. The squadron also took part in Operation Varsity in March 1945, a major allied airborne offensive across the Rhine.

When the war finished, the squadron transported troops to Norway, and was then assigned to various overseas mail routes prior to disbanding at RAF Rivenhall on 8 January 1946.

== Aircraft operated ==
Aircraft operated by No. 570 Squadron RAF
From	To	Aircraft	Variant
November 1943	August 1944	Armstrong Whitworth Albemarle	Mks.I & II
May 1944	August 1944	Armstrong Whitworth Albemarle	Mk.V
July 1944	January 1946	Short Stirling	Mk.IV

== Squadron bases ==
Airfields used by No. 570 Squadron RAF
From	To	Base	Remark
15 November 1943	14 March 1944	RAF Hurn, Dorset	Det. at RAF Stoney Cross, Hampshire
14 March 1944	7 October 1944	RAF Harwell, Berkshire	Det. at RAF Ayr, Ayrshire, Scotland
7 October 1944	8 January 1946	RAF Rivenhall, Essex	Det. at RAF East Fortune, East Lothian, Scotland

== Commanding officers ==
Officers commanding No. 570 Squadron RAF
From	To	Name
15 November 1943	17 June 1945	W/Cdr. R.J.M. Bangay
17 June 1945	August 1945	W/Cdr. K.R. Slater
August 1945	15 December 1945	W/Cdr. R.E. Young, DSO, DFC
15 December 1945	8 January 1946	W/Cdr. J. Blackburn, DSO, DFC

== See also ==
- No. 38 Group RAF
- List of Royal Air Force aircraft squadrons
