= No. 38 Group RAF =

Group command element of the Royal Air Force

- No. 38 Group badge
- Active: 6 November 1943 – 31 January 1951; 1 January 1960 – 18 November 1983; 31 October 1992 – 1 April 2000; 1 July 2014 – 31 December 2020
- Country: United Kingdom
- Branch: Royal Air Force
- Type: Royal Air Force group
- Part of: RAF Transport Command; RAF Air Support Command; RAF Strike Command; RAF Air Command
- Motto: Par Nobile Fratrum (Latin for 'A noble pair of brothers')

Insignia
- Group badge heraldry: An eagle's leg grasping a sword

No. 38 Group RAF was a group of the Royal Air Force which disbanded on 31 December 2020. It was formed on 6 November 1943 from the former 38 Wing with nine squadrons as part of Allied Expeditionary Air Force (AEAF). It was disbanded on 31 January 1951, but re-formed on 1 January 1960, became part of RAF Air Support Command in 1967 and then, in 1972, the air support group within RAF Strike Command. It was temporarily disbanded from 18 Nov 1983 to 31 Oct 1992 and from 1 April 2000 to 1 July 2014. It subsequently became part of RAF Air Command, bringing together the Royal Air Force’s Engineering, Logistics, Communications and Medical Operations units. Air Officer Commanding No. 38 Group was also responsible for UK-based United States Visiting Forces (USVF) units and for RAF personnel attached to other global armed forces.

== History ==
The predecessor of 38 Group was No. 38 Wing RAF, initially formed on 15 January 1942 from 296 and 297 Squadrons and based at RAF Netheravon in Wiltshire under Group Captain Sir Nigel Norman. 295 Squadron was additionally formed at Netheravon on 3 August 1942. To these were added 570, 298, 299, 190, 196, 620 Squadrons to form No. 38 Group on 11 October 1943. At that time four squadrons were equipped with Armstrong Whitworth Albemarles (295, 296, 297, 570), one with Handley Page Halifaxes (298) and four with Short Stirlings (299, 190, 196, 620). A further Halifax unit, 644 Squadron, was added in February 1944.

During 1943, changes of all aircraft types and operational bases were made. Nevertheless 295, 296 and 297 Squadrons were heavily involved that year in operations Beggar, Ladbroke and Fustian, during the invasion of Sicily. From February 1944 many sorties were made over mainland Europe in support of Special Operations Executive and detachments of the Special Air Service.

But by 5 June 1944 the group’s updated resources had been fully redeployed between RAF Brize Norton, RAF Fairford, RAF Harwell, RAF Keevil and RAF Tarrant Rushton in preparation for Operation Overlord, the invasion of Europe. From then to 16 June the Group was fully involved in operations Tonga (the delivery of paratroop-filled gliders at the onset of Overlord) and Mallard (the delivery of the main airborne forces and their equipment by glider).

In September 1944 the group was called upon to ferry airborne troops for Operation Market Garden, the abortive attempt to capture the Rhine bridge at Arnhem. Following that operation there was further reorganisation; the Group Headquarters moved to Marks Hall, Essex in October 1944 and the squadrons were redeployed to RAF Earls Colne (296 and 297), RAF Rivenhall (295 and 570), RAF Great Dunmow (190 and 620), RAF Wethersfield (later to RAF Shepherds Grove) (196 and 299) and RAF Woodbridge (298 and 644). 190 Squadron remained temporarily at RAF Fairford. On 10 March 1945 161 Squadron at RAF Tempsford also came under 38 Group control.

On 24 March 1945 the squadrons were fully employed in delivering airborne troops to the far bank of the Rhine as part of Operation Varsity, an operation which proved costly in terms of aircrew lives lost.

After the war most 38 Group squadrons were either disbanded or relocated to the Far East and the HQ moved to RAF Upavon. 295 and 297 Squadrons merged and moved to Fairford. 38 Group became part of RAF Transport Command on 1 June 1945.

In 1972, Headquarters 38 Group moved from RAF Odiham, Hants, where it had been since 1960, to RAF Benson, Oxon. Also that year, on 1 July 1972, it became part of the new RAF Strike Command. No. 46 Group RAF was merged into 38 Group on 1 January 1976. On 17 November 1983, 38 Group was subsumed within Headquarters No. 1 Group RAF at RAF Upavon in Wiltshire.

38 Group was again active during the 1990s from 1 November 1992 to 2000.

From 2014, the reformed group had units at RAF Wittering, RAF Brize Norton, RAF High Wycombe and RAF Leeming. The reformed group now includes RAF A4 Force Elements (deployable engineering and logistic units), Tactical Medical Wing at Brize Norton, and Tactical Communications Wing RAF at RAF Leeming. On 1 April 2015 38 Group assumed responsibility for the Royal Air Force Mountain Rescue Service (MRS) with its three teams at RAF Lossiemouth, RAF Leeming and RAF Valley where it is co-located with the MRS Headquarters.

38 Group was disbanded on 31 December 2020, with the units under its command dispersed to other groups and areas of the RAF, including the newly formed integrated Support Force. In 2025 a D-Day memorial sculpture to the 6th Airborne Division, No. 38 Group RAF, and the Glider Pilot Regiment, inspired by the form of the fuselage of the wooden Horsa gliders was unveiled on the site of the former RAF Harwell.

== Orders of battle ==
=== 1944 ===
Order of battle for No. 38 Group RAF, 6 June 1944
Station	Squadron	Aircraft	No Operational
RAF Brize Norton	296; 297	Armstrong Whitworth Albemarle; Armstrong Whitworth Albemarle	37; 36
RAF Fairford	190; 620	Short Stirling; Short Stirling	33; 30
RAF Harwell	295; 570	Armstrong Whitworth Albemarle; Armstrong Whitworth Albemarle	34; 36
RAF Keevil	196; 299	Short Stirling; Short Stirling	36; 35
RAF Tarrant Rushton	298; 644	Handley Page Halifax; Handley Page Halifax	30; 21

=== 1945 ===
Order of battle for No. 38 Group RAF, July 1945
Station	Squadron	Aircraft
RAF Earls Colne	296; 297	Handley Page Halifax; Handley Page Halifax
RAF Great Dunmow	190; 620	Handley Page Halifax; Handley Page Halifax
RAF Rivenhall	295; 570	Short Stirling; Short Stirling
RAF Shepherds Grove	196; 299	Short Stirling; Short Stirling
RAF Tarrant Rushton	298; 644	Handley Page Halifax; Handley Page Halifax

=== 1962 ===
Order of battle for No. 38 Group RAF, April 1962
Station	Squadron	Aircraft
RAF Abingdon	47; 53	Blackburn Beverley; Blackburn Beverley
RAF Aldergrove	118	Bristol Sycamore
RAF Colerne	24; 36	Handley Page Hastings; Handley Page Hastings
RAF Odiham	66; 72; 225; 230	Bristol Belvedere; Bristol Belvedere; Bristol Sycamore/Westland Whirlwind; Scottish Aviation Pioneer
RAF Waterbeach	1; 54; 64	Hawker Hunter; Hawker Hunter; Gloster Javelin

=== 1982 ===
Order of battle for No. 38 Group RAF, January 1982
Station	Squadron	Aircraft
RAF Aldergrove	72	Westland Wessex
Ladyville, Belize	1417 Flt.	Hawker Siddeley Harrier
RAF Brize Norton	10; 115	Vickers VC10; Hawker Siddeley Andover
RAF Coltishall	6; 41; 54	SEPECAT Jaguar; SEPECAT Jaguar; SEPECAT Jaguar
RAF Lyneham	24; 30; 47; 70	Lockheed C-130 Hercules; Lockheed C-130 Hercules; Lockheed C-130 Hercules; Lockheed C-130 Hercules
RAF Northolt	32; 207	Hawker Siddeley Andover/Westland Gazelle/British Aerospace 125/Westland Whirlwind de Havilland Devon
RAF Odiham	18; 33	Boeing Chinook; Westland Puma
RAF Wittering	1	Hawker Siddeley Harrier

=== 2016 ===
Order of Battle for No. 38 Group RAF, December 2016

Formation	Unit	Sub-unit	Role	Location
RAF Wittering	Operations Wing		Aerodrome Management	Cambridgeshire and Northamptonshire
RAF Wittering	Support Wing		Service Support	Cambridgeshire and Northamptonshire
RAF A4 Force Elements	No 1 Air Mobility Wing	Operations Squadron	Movements	RAF Brize Norton
RAF A4 Force Elements	No 1 Air Mobility Wing	Air Movements Squadron	Movements	RAF Brize Norton
RAF A4 Force Elements	No 1 Air Mobility Wing	UK Mobile Air Movements Squadron	Movements	RAF Brize Norton
RAF A4 Force Elements	No 42 (Expeditionary Support) Wing	No 71 (Inspection and Repair) Squadron	Aircraft engineering	RAF Wittering
RAF A4 Force Elements	No 42 (Expeditionary Support) Wing	No 93 (Expeditionary Armaments) Squadron	Weapons engineering	RAF Marham
RAF A4 Force Elements	No 42 (Expeditionary Support) Wing	No 5001 Squadron	Ground engineering	RAF Wittering
RAF A4 Force Elements	No 42 (Expeditionary Support) Wing	No. 5131 (Bomb Disposal) Squadron	Explosive Ordnance Disposal	RAF Wittering
RAF A4 Force Elements	No. 85 (Expeditionary Logistics) Wing	No 1 Expeditionary Logistics Squadron	Supply	RAF Wittering
RAF A4 Force Elements	No. 85 (Expeditionary Logistics) Wing	No 2 Mechanical Transport Squadron	Transport	RAF Wittering
RAF A4 Force Elements	No. 85 (Expeditionary Logistics) Wing	No 3 Mobile Catering Squadron	Catering and accommodation management	RAF Wittering
RAF A4 Force Elements	No. 85 (Expeditionary Logistics) Wing	No 501 (County of Gloucester) Squadron Royal Auxiliary Air Force	Logistics	RAF Brize Norton
RAF A4 Force Elements	No. 85 (Expeditionary Logistics) Wing	No 504 (County of Nottingham) Squadron Royal Auxiliary Air Force	Logistics	RAF Wittering
RAF A4 Force Elements	No. 85 (Expeditionary Logistics) Wing	No 605 (County of Warwick) Squadron Royal Auxiliary Air Force	Logistics	RAF Cosford
RAF A4 Force Elements	No. 85 (Expeditionary Logistics) Wing	RAF Mountain Rescue Service		RAF Valley; RAF Leeming; RAF Lossiemouth
RAF A4 Force Elements	No. 85 (Expeditionary Logistics) Wing	Joint Aircraft Recovery and Transportation Squadron		MOD Boscombe Down
RAF A4 Force Elements	No 4624 (County of Oxford) Squadron Royal Auxiliary Air Force		Movements	RAF Brize Norton
RAF Music Services	The Central Band of the Royal Air Force		Ceremonial	RAF Northolt
RAF Music Services	The Band of the RAF Regiment		Ceremonial	RAF Northolt
RAF Music Services	The RAF Salon Orchestra		Ceremonial	RAF Northolt
RAF Music Services	The Band of the Royal Air Force College		Ceremonial	RAF College Cranwell
RAF Music Services	The Band of the Royal Auxiliary Air Force		Ceremonial	RAF College Cranwell
RAF High Wycombe			Support to collocated headquarters	Buckinghamshire
No. 90 Signals Unit	Tactical Communications Wing	No 2 Field Communications Squadron	Communications	RAF Leeming
No. 90 Signals Unit	Tactical Communications Wing	No 3 Field Communications Squadron	Communications	RAF Leeming
No. 90 Signals Unit	Tactical Communications Wing	No 4 Field Communications Squadron	Communications	RAF Leeming
No. 90 Signals Unit	Operational Information Services Wing	No 1 (Engineering Support) Squadron	Communications	RAF Leeming
No. 90 Signals Unit	Operational Information Services Wing	No 5 (Information Services) Squadron	Communications	RAF Leeming
No. 90 Signals Unit	Operational Information Services Wing	Capability and Innovation Squadron	Communications	RAF Leeming
RAF Medical Operations	RAF Centre of Aviation Medicine		Medical Support	RAF Henlow
RAF Medical Operations	Tactical Medical Wing	Aeromedical Evacuation Squadron	Medical Support	RAF Brize Norton
RAF Medical Operations	Tactical Medical Wing	Operations Squadron	Medical Support	RAF Brize Norton
RAF Medical Operations	Tactical Medical Wing	Capability and Sustainment Squadron	Medical Support	RAF Brize Norton
RAF Medical Operations	Tactical Medical Wing	Training Squadron	Medical Support	RAF Brize Norton
RAF Medical Operations	No 612 (County of Aberdeen) Squadron Royal Auxiliary Air Force		Air Transportable Surgical	Leuchars Station
RAF Medical Operations	No 4626 (County of Wiltshire) Squadron Royal Auxiliary Air Force		Aeromedical Evacuation	RAF Brize Norton

== Commanding officers ==
=== 38 Wing ===
Commanding officers no. 38 Wing RAF
Date	Name
19 January 1942	Air Commodore Sir Nigel Norman (Killed on duty 19 May 1943)
29 April 1943	Air Commodore William H Primrose

=== 38 Group ===
Commanding officers no. 38 Group RAF
Date	Name
6 November 1943	Air Vice-Marshal Leslie Norman Hollinghurst
18 October 1944	Air Vice-Marshal James Rowland Scarlett-Streatfield
1 June 1945	Air Commodore Noel Christie Singer
1 August 1945	Air Vice-Marshal Ronald Ivelaw-Chapman
5 November 1946	Air Vice-Marshal Arthur Leonard Fiddament
17 January 1949	Air Vice-Marshal Alfred Charles Henry Sharp
25 January 1950	Air Vice-Marshal Edgar James Kingston-McClaughry
1 January 1960	Air Vice-Marshal Peter Wykeham
27 July 1962	Air Vice-Marshal T W Piper
1 January 1965	Air Vice-Marshal Leslie Mavor
1 March 1966	Air Vice-Marshal Peter C Fletcher
1 August 1967	Air Vice-Marshal Harold Brownlow Martin
24 June 1970	Air Vice-Marshal Denis Crowley-Milling
21 February 1972	Air Vice-Marshal Frederick S Hazlewood
2 November 1974	Air Vice-Marshal Peter G K Williamson
10 December 1977	Air Vice-Marshal Joseph A Gilbert
27 February 1980	Air Vice-Marshal Donald P Hall
1984–1985	Air Vice-Marshal David Parry-Evans
15 January 1993	Air Vice-Marshal J A G May
1994	Air Vice-Marshal David Cousins
21 April 1995	Air Vice-Marshal David A Hurrell
30 January 1998	Air Vice-Marshal Philip Sturley
2 July 2014	Air Vice-Marshal Tim Bishop
16 June 2016	Air Vice-Marshal Susan C Gray
December 2018	Air Vice-Marshal Simon D Ellard

== See also ==
- List of Royal Air Force groups
- List of Royal Air Force aircraft squadrons
