= James Blackburn (RAF officer) =

Royal Air Force officer

- Born: 8 March 1916; Acton, London
- Died: 1993 (aged 76–77)
- Military career
- Allegiance: United Kingdom
- Branch: Royal Air Force
- Service years: 1936–1946
- Rank: Wing Commander
- Service number: 70067
- Commands: No. 196 Squadron (1946); No. 570 Squadron (1945–46); No. 159 Squadron (1944); No. 148 Squadron (1942–43); No. 104 Squadron (1942)
- Conflicts: Second World War
- Awards: Distinguished Service Order & Bar; Distinguished Flying Cross & Bar; Mentioned in Despatches; Distinguished Flying Cross (United States)

James Blackburn, DSO & Bar, DFC & Bar (8 March 1916 – 1993) was a Royal Air Force officer who completed a record five tours of operations during the Second World War.

== Early life ==
Blackburn was born on 8 March 1916, in Acton, London, the son of Sir Arthur Dickinson Blackburn, and was educated at Wellington College, Berkshire, and The Queen's College, Oxford. While at Oxford he joined the Oxford University Air Squadron, and was commissioned in to the Royal Air Force Reserve of Officers in 1936.

== Second World War ==
During the Second World War, Blackburn served first as a Blenheim pilot with No. 57 Squadron and then with No. 70 Squadron as a flight lieutenant, later to be promoted to squadron leader and then wing commander. Blackburn was awarded the Distinguished Flying Cross in November 1941, followed by a Bar to the award in September 1942.

Blackburn was posted to North Africa in May 1942 to take command of No. 104 Squadron and remained in command of the squadron until August 1942.

On 12 September 1942, Blackburn was travelling aboard the RMS Laconia when it was torpedoed 130 miles north-northeast of Ascension Island, by the German submarine U-156. The events that followed became known as the Laconia incident. Blackburn survived the sinking of the Laconia and was taken prisoner of war, later to be imprisoned in Vichy controlled Morocco. In November 1942, Blackburn along with three other officers escaped and made their way to the American held lines in Morocco.

In October 1943, Blackburn was awarded the Distinguished Service Order (DSO) while in command of No. 148 Squadron.

From July 1944 to January 1945, Blackburn commanded No. 159 Squadron.

In December 1944, Blackburn was awarded a Bar to his DSO, working for Force 136, in recognition of his exemplary leadership during bombing and mine-laying missions. Blackburn was also awarded the American Distinguished Flying Cross by the United States Air Force, in recognition of the pioneering work that No. 159 Squadron carried out, extending the operational range of the Consolidated Liberator aircraft. Following his presentation with the medal, Blackburn held a party to celebrate at Firpos restaurant in Calcutta.

Blackburn commanded No. 570 Squadron from 15 December 1945 until 8 January 1946, and then No. 196 Squadron until 16 March 1946.

== Awards and honours ==
- 4 November 1941, Flight Lieutenant James Blackburn (70067), Reserve of Air Force Officers, No.70 Squadron, awarded the Distinguished Flying Cross:

This officer has completed 44 operational missions over enemy territory, involving 335 hours flying. Within the past four months, Flight Lieutenant Blackburn has completed 25 sorties, the majority of which have been made from advanced landing grounds, with an average of 11 hours flying time per sortie. Throughout he has displayed great skill and efficiency and set an excellent example. He is always ready to carry out any duty and his experience has proved invaluable.

- 18 September 1942, Acting Wing Commander James Blackburn DFC (70067), Reserve of Air Force Officers, No.70 Squadron, awarded Bar to Distinguished Flying Cross:

This officer is engaged on his second tour of operational flying. As flight commander he has displayed outstanding enthusiasm and keenness, which has proved a source of inspiration. Undeterred by enemy opposition, he always presses home his attacks with the utmost skill and determination. Recently, over Benghazi, his aircraft was held in searchlight beams and subjected to accurate anti-aircraft fire. Despite this, he made another run over the area and released his bombs alongside a ship moored in the outer Mole. On another occasion, in similar circumstances, at Martuba, Squadron Leader Blackburn bombed the landing ground, starting three fires. His efficiency is of a high standard.

- 1 October 1943, Wing Commander James Blackburn DFC (70067), Reserve of Air Force Officers, No.148 Squadron, awarded the Distinguished Service Order:

Since he was appointed to command this squadron, Wing Commander Blackburn has completed 300 hours operational flying, nearly all of which has been at night. His sorties have involved very long flights over difficult and mountainous country, where he has displayed skill, courage and endurance of a high order. The success of the operations completed by his squadron have been largely due to this officer's personal example and masterly leadership.

- 8 December 1944, Wing Commander James Blackburn DSO, DFC (70067), R.A.F.O., No.159 Squadron, awarded Bar to Distinguished Service Order:

This officer has an outstanding record. He has completed five tours of operational duty. He has commanded this squadron for the past few months, and during the period has participated in a number of bombing attacks and several minelaying missions. During these operations, despite very bad weather, not once has he failed to attack his allotted target. Both in the air and on the ground his example has proved inspiring. His genius for leadership, great skill and fine fighting spirit have contributed in good measure to the high standard of efficiency of the squadron he commands
