= No. 196 Squadron RAF =

Defunct flying squadron of the Royal Air Force

- Active: 7 Nov 1917 – 16 Mar 1946
- Country: United Kingdom
- Branch: Royal Air Force
- Role: Bomber; Airborne Forces; Special Operations; Transport
- Part of: No. 4 Group RAF; No. 3 Group RAF; No. 38 Group RAF
- Mottos: Latin: Sic fidem servamus (Translation: "Thus we keep faith")

Insignia
- Squadron Badge heraldry: A Mailed Fist holding a Dagger, hilt downwards
- Squadron Codes: ZO (Nov 1942 – Mar 1946); 7T (May 1943 – Mar 1946)

No. 196 Squadron was a Royal Air Force squadron originally formed as a training unit during World War I. It was active during World War II in Nos. 3, 4 and 38 Group RAF. It served first as a bomber squadron and later as an airborne support and transport unit.

== History ==
=== Formation and early years ===
The first 196 Squadron was originally formed as a training unit at Heliopolis, in Egypt on 9 August 1917 and disbanded a mere 3 months later on 13 November 1917, becoming a part of the Aerial Fighting School.

=== Reformation and World War II ===
196 Squadron was reformed at RAF Driffield, Yorkshire on 7 November 1942 as a night bomber unit in No. 4 Group, part of Bomber Command. It was initially equipped with Mk.III and Mk.X Vickers Wellingtons. The squadron carried out many raids on enemy ports and industrial centres in Europe in 1943; it also flew numerous 'gardening' (minelaying) sorties.

On 19 July 1943, the squadron moved south to RAF Witchford, Cambridgeshire, as part of No. 3 Group and was re-equipped with Mk. III Stirling bombers. They moved again to RAF Leicester East later that year and became part of No.38 Group. They then carried out various transport, glider-towing and supply-dropping flights and also undertook SOE and SAS parachuting missions over occupied territories. This required converting to the Mark IV, the 'cloak and dagger' version of the Stirling. On 7 January 1944, the squadron moved again to RAF Tarrant Rushton, Dorset. In February of that year supply drops to the French Resistance commenced, unfortunately with the loss of two aircraft. Many other such missions were subsequently flown successfully.

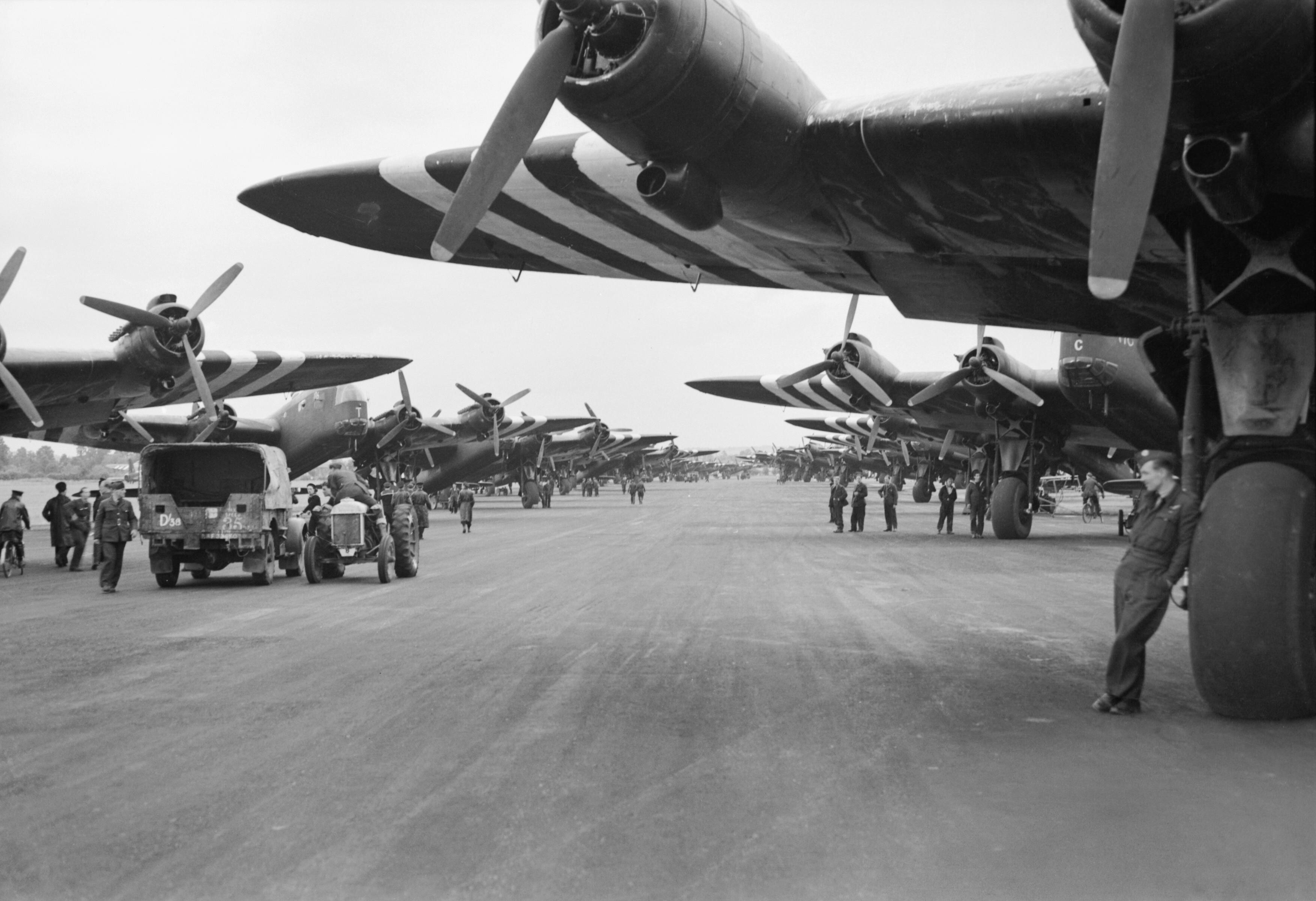
Short Stirlings of Nos. 196 and 299 Squadrons RAF lining the runway at RAF Keevil on the evening of 5 June 1944 before emplaning paratroops of the 5th Parachute Brigade Group for the invasion of Normandy

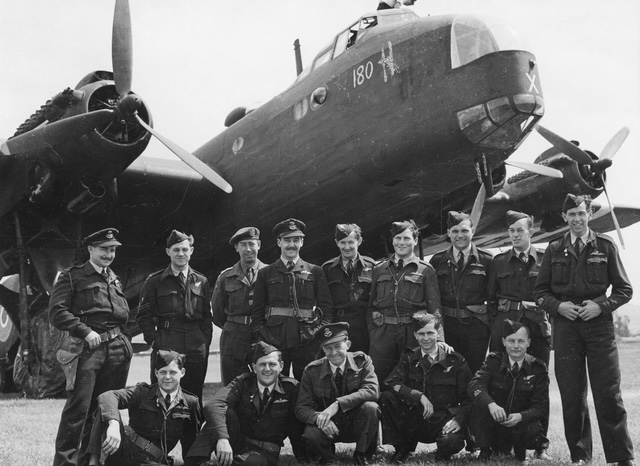
Australian members of No. 196 Squadron and a Stirling shortly before D-Day

On 14 March 1944, the squadron was moved yet again in preparation for D-Day to RAF Keevil, Wiltshire. There they trained with 299 Squadron for their part in Operation Overlord. Their mission was to deliver paratroops of the 5th Parachute Brigade and 6th Airborne Division as part of Operation Tonga (each Stirling could carry 20 troops and their equipment). They then had to return to Normandy, towing gliders laden with the main force and their equipment as part of Operation Mallard. At 23:00 on 5 June 1944, 23 Stirlings of 196 Squadron (plus 23 of 299 Squadron), took off to successfully drop paratroops in Normandy, although one aircraft of 196 Squadron was lost. The following day, D-Day itself, a second wave (17 from 196 Squadron), took off at 18:00 towing Horsa gliders as part of Operation Mallard. All returned safely. On 8 June, seven Stirlings carried out a re-supply mission to Normandy as part of Operation Rob Roy.

Between 13 and 17 September 1944, the squadron was heavily involved in Operation Market Garden. 196 Squadron flew 115 sorties, towing gliders and delivering men and supplies under difficult conditions. In total 25 men were killed and 13 aircraft were lost due to anti-aircraft fire and enemy planes during the operation. On 9 October 1944 the squadron was again relocated, this time to RAF Wethersfield, Essex and from there on 26 January 1945 to RAF Shepherds Grove, Suffolk. On 24 March 1945, the squadron took part in Operation Varsity, the Rhine crossing. 30 gliders were towed to Hamminkeln, Germany (89 troops and their equipment) of which one was lost when it crashed in the Netherlands.

In May 1945 troops were taken to Denmark (Operation Schnapps) and Norway (Operation Doomsday) to disarm the German forces there, one aircraft was lost. After the end of the war the squadron was employed on transport support as part of Transport Command, undertaking various troop-ferrying, freight carrying and mail delivery duties before being disbanded on 16 March 1946.

== Aircraft operated ==
Aircraft operated by no. 196 Squadron, data from
From	To	Aircraft	Version
December 1942	December 1942	Vickers Wellington	Mk.III
December 1942	July 1943	Vickers Wellington	Mk.X
July 1943	January 1944	Short Stirling	Mk.III
January 1944	March 1946	Short Stirling	Mk.IV
January 1946	March 1946	Short Stirling	Mk.V

== Squadron bases ==
Bases and airfields used by no. 196 Squadron, data from
From	To	Base
7 November 1942	22 December 1942	RAF Driffield, Yorkshire
22 December 1942	19 July 1943	RAF Leconfield, East Riding of Yorkshire
19 July 1943	18 November 1943	RAF Witchford, Cambridgeshire
18 November 1943	7 January 1944	RAF Leicester East, Leicestershire
7 January 1944	14 March 1944	RAF Tarrant Rushton, Dorset
14 March 1944	9 October 1944	RAF Keevil, Wiltshire
9 October 1944	25 January 1945	RAF Wethersfield, Essex
25 January 1945	16 March 1946	RAF Shepherds Grove, Suffolk

== Commanding officers ==
Officers commanding no. 196 Squadron, data from
From	To	Name
November 1942	March 1943	W/Cdr. R.H. Waterhouse, CBE, DFC, AFC, SS(US)
March 1943	December 1943	W/Cdr. A.G. Duguid
December 1943	August 1944	W/Cdr. N. Alexander, DFC
August 1944	February 1945	W/Cdr. M.W.L. Baker
February 1945	January 1946	W/Cdr. R.T.F. Turner, DFC, MC, DFC(US)
January 1946	March 1946	W/Cdr. J. Blackburn, DSO & Bar, DFC & Bar, DFC(US)

== The Windsor Boys' School ==
The Windsor Boys' School's Burgess house uses 196 Squadron's badge and motto. The House leaders award is the most honourable award given by the house leader. Only a small number of boys get this award.

== See also ==
- No. 38 Group RAF
- List of Royal Air Force aircraft squadrons
