= No. 296 Squadron RAF =

British flying squadron, 1942–1946

- Active: 25 January 1942 – 23 January 1946
- Country: United Kingdom
- Branch: Royal Air Force
- Role: Airborne forces and Transport
- Part of: No. 38 Group RAF
- Motto: Prepared for all things
- Engagements: Sicily, Normandy, Arnhem

Insignia
- Squadron Badge heraldry: In front of a sword in pale, the point downwards, a scroll
- Squadron Codes: XH (Aug 1942 – Nov 1943); 9W (Oct 1943 – Jan 1946); 7C (Mar 1944 – Jan 1946)

No. 296 Squadron RAF was a transport squadron of the Royal Air Force during the Second World War. With sister squadrons 295 and 297 it formed 38 Wing, which later expanded to create No. 38 Group RAF.

== History ==
=== With the Airborne Forces ===
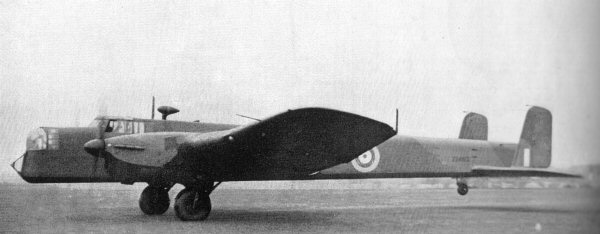
An Armstrong Whitworth Whitley Mk.V like the ones used by No. 296 Squadron

No. 296 Squadron was formed at Ringway Airport near Manchester on 25 January 1942 from the Glider Exercise Unit as an airborne forces unit, equipped with obsolete Hawker Hectors and Hawker Harts, and moved to RAF Netheravon to concentrate on glider training. In June 1942 it began to receive the Armstrong Whitworth Whitley and in October 1942 began flying leaflet dropping missions over France. In early 1943 the squadron converted to the Albemarle Mk.I and in Summer 1943 moved 32 aircraft to Froha, Algeria to take part in Operation Husky, the invasion of Sicily, returning later in the year.

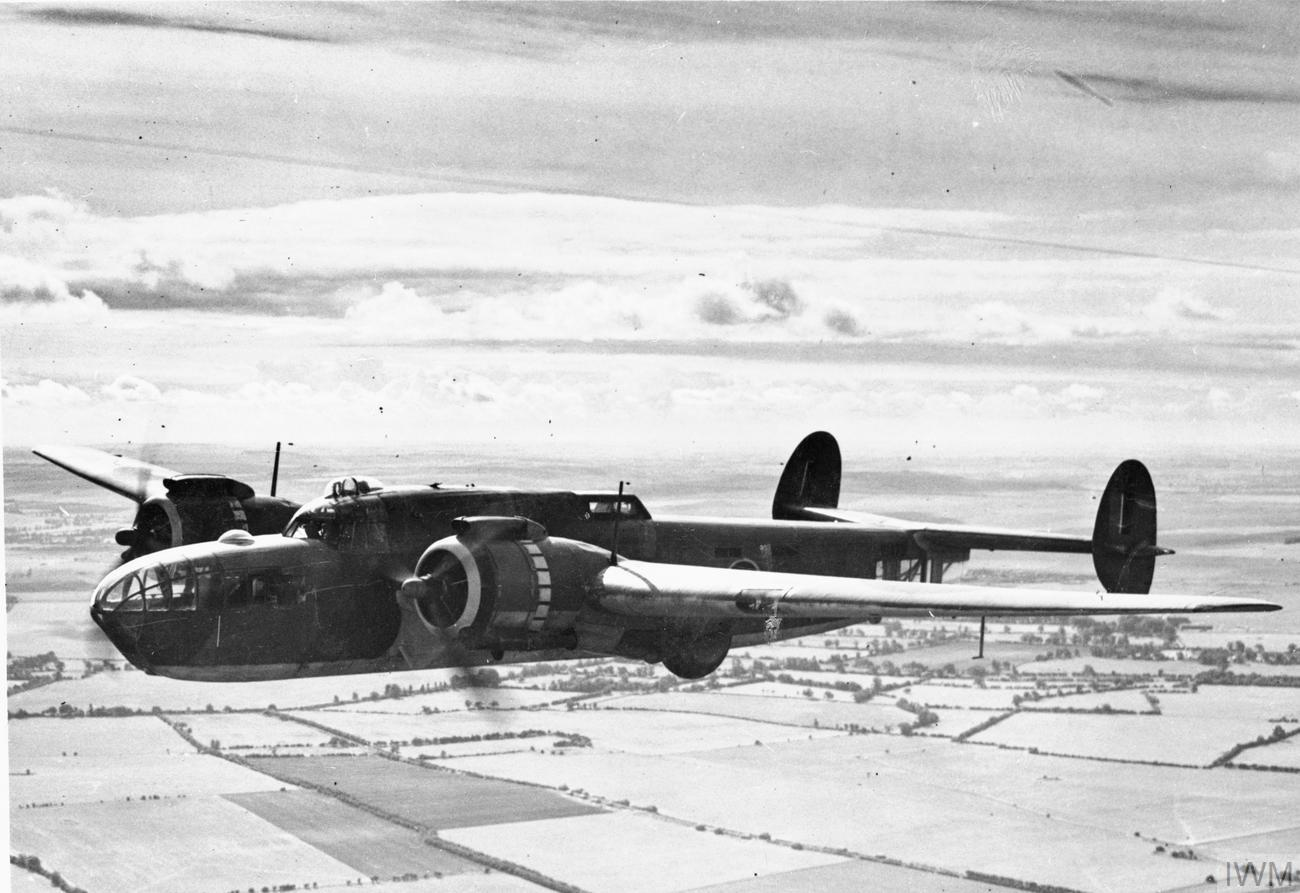
An example of the Armstrong Whitworth Albemarle as used by No. 296 Squadron

The squadron was involved in the first part of the D-Day landings. On the night of 5/6 June 1944, as part of Operation Tonga, three Albemarles flew Pathfinder parachutists to Normandy followed by eight more loaded with paratroops of 5th Parachute Brigade. During 6 June the squadron returned with a further eight towing Horsa gliders. For Operation Mallard which immediately followed, No. 296 Squadron despatched 19 aircraft towing gliders to Normandy. Other missions involved dropping SAS sabotage teams behind enemy lines. The Albemarle's last major mission came during the Battle of Arnhem, where the squadron towed across forty-six gliders in two waves from Manston aerodrome without loss in the first two days of the battle. The Albemarles gave way in September 1944 to the Handley Page Halifax of which 30 were provided for Operation Varsity, the Rhine crossings. At the end of the war the squadron was used to ferry troops to Norway and Denmark to take the German surrender and to bring liberated POWs back to Britain.

=== With Transport Command ===
The squadron operated a mail service to India from December 1945 until it disbanded on 23 January 1946 at RAF Earls Colne, Essex.

== Aircraft operated ==
Aircraft operated by No. 296 Squadron
From	To	Aircraft	Version
January 1942	August 1942	Hawker Hector	Mk.1
January 1942	August 1942	Hawker Hart	
June 1942	March 1943	Armstrong Whitworth Whitley	Mk.V
January 1943	November 1944	Armstrong Whitworth Albemarle	Mks.I, II
September 1944	November 1944	Armstrong Whitworth Albemarle	Mks.IV, V
September 1944	Mar 1945	Handley Page Halifax	Mk.V
February 1945	January 1946	Handley Page Halifax	Mk.III
December 1945	January 1946	Handley Page Halifax	A.7

== Squadron bases ==
Bases and airfields used by No. 296 Squadron
From	To	Base	Remark
25 January 1942	1 February 1942	RAF Ringway, Cheshire	Formed here
1 February 1942	25 July 1942	RAF Netheravon, Wiltshire	Det. at RAF Hurn, Dorset
25 July 1942	25 October 1942	RAF Hurn, Dorset	
25 October 1942	19 December 1942	RAF Andover, Hampshire	
19 December 1942	25 June 1943	RAF Hurn, Dorset	
3 June 1943	15 October 1943	RAF Stoney Cross, Hampshire	Ground echelon
3 June 1943	24 June 1943	Froha, Algeria	Air echelon
24 June 1943	15 October 1943	Goubrine II, Tunisia	Air echelon. Dets. at Cassibile, Sicily and Torrente Comunelli Airfield, Sicily
15 October 1943	14 March 1944	RAF Hurn, Dorset	Det. at RAF Ayr, Ayrshire, Scotland
14 March 1944	29 September 1944	RAF Brize Norton, Oxfordshire	
29 September 1944	23 January 1946	RAF Earls Colne, Essex	Disbanded here

== Commanding officers ==
Officers commanding No. 296 Squadron
From	To	Name
January 1942	October 1942	S/Ldr. P.B.N. Davis
October 1942	July 1943	W/Cdr. P.R. May, AFC
July 1943	August 1943	W/Cdr. L.C. Bartram
August 1943	October 1944	W/Cdr. D.I. McInnies
October 1944	February 1945	S/Ldr. R.W. Jamieson
February 1945	January 1946	W/Cdr. T.C. Musgrave

== See also ==
- No. 38 Group RAF
- List of Royal Air Force aircraft squadrons
