= RAF Thruxton =

Former Royal Air Force station

RAF Thruxton USAAF Station AAF-407
- Near Thruxton, Hampshire in England
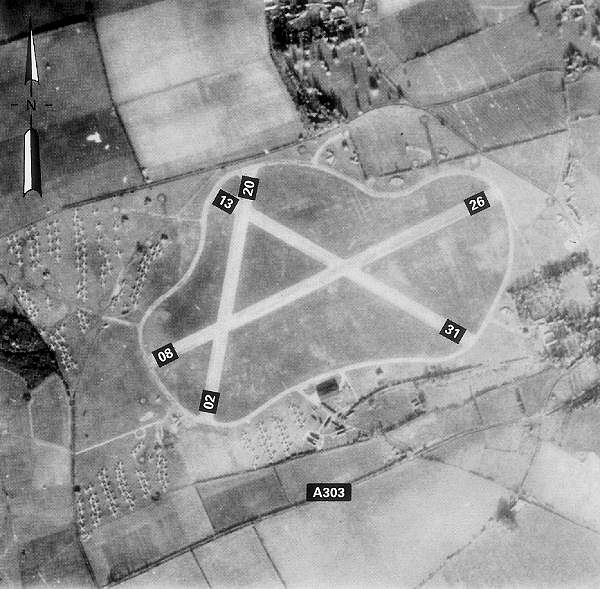
- Thruxton Airfield - May 1945. Already large numbers of combat aircraft being stored at the airfield, parked wingtip to wingtip on the grass areas, prior to their being returned to the United States.

Site information
- Type: Royal Air Force station
- Owner: Air Ministry
- Operator: Royal Air Force; United States Army Air Forces
- Controlled by: RAF Fighter Command; Ninth Air Force

Location
- Shown within Hampshire RAF Thruxton (the United Kingdom)
- Coordinates: 51°12′29″N 001°36′02″W

Site history
- Built: 1941
- In use: 1942 - 1946
- Battles/wars: European theatre of World War II

Airfield information
- Elevation: 90 metres (295 ft) AMSL
Runways
| Direction | Length and surface |
|---|---|
| 02/20 | 900 metres (2,953 ft) Concrete |
| 08/26 | 1,360 metres (4,462 ft) Concrete |
| 13/31 | 1,040 metres (3,412 ft) Concrete |

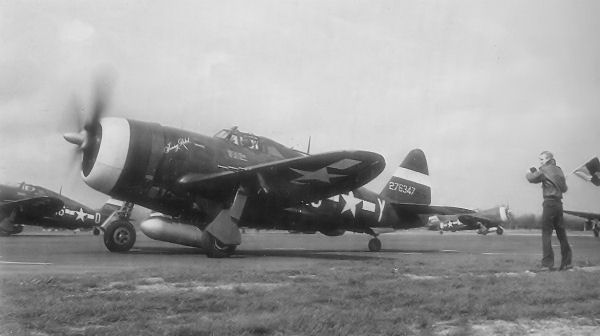
"Jenny Rebel", Republic P-47D-15-RE Thunderbolt 42-76347 of 389th Fighter Squadron shown taking off on runway 25 from Thruxton airfield

Royal Air Force Thruxton or more simply RAF Thruxton is a former Royal Air Force station located 5 miles (8 km) west of Andover, Hampshire.

Opened in 1942, it was used by both the Royal Air Force and United States Army Air Forces.

During the war Thruxton was used primarily as a combat fighter airfield.

However, paratroops who participated in the Bruneval raid (Operation Biting) in which German radar technology was captured took off from here in Armstrong Whitworth Whitley bombers on the evening of 27 February 1942. Also, gliders used in the D-day landings operated from here.

After the war it was closed in 1946.

Today the site is occupied by the Thruxton Circuit. It remains an active aerodrome at the same time, now named Thruxton Aerodrome.

== History ==
While under United States Army Air Forces (USAAF) control, it was known as USAAF Station AAF-407 for security reasons, and by which it was referred to instead of location. Its station-ID was "TX".

Thruxton was transferred to the USAAF Ninth Air Force on 3 January 1944. On 1 March the 366th Fighter Group with Republic P-47 Thunderbolts were transferred to the airfield from RAF Membury. Operational squadrons of the group were:

- 389th Fighter Squadron (A6)
- 390th Fighter Squadron (B2)
- 391st Fighter Squadron (A8)

The 366th was a group of Ninth Air Force's 71st Fighter Wing, IX Tactical Air Command. The group moved to its Advanced Landing Ground (ALG) at St. Pierre du Mont, France (ALG A-1) on 17 June 1944 .

== Units ==
The following squadrons were here at some point:

- No. 12 Squadron RAF
- No. 13 Squadron RAF
- No. 16 Squadron RAF
- No. 63 Squadron RAF
- No. 142 Squadron RAF
- No. 168 Squadron RAF
- No. 170 Squadron RAF
- No. 225 Squadron RAF
- No. 226 Squadron RAF
- No. 268 Squadron RAF
- No. 297 Squadron RAF
- No. 298 Squadron RAF
- No. 614 (County of Glamorgan) Squadron AAF

The following units were here at some point:

- No. 15 (Pilots) Advanced Flying Unit RAF
- No. 42 OTU
- No. 43 OTU
- No. 123 Airfield Headquarters RAF
- No. 1311 (Transport) Flight RAF
- No. 1427 (Ferry Training) Flight RAF
- No. 2758 Squadron RAF Regiment
- No. 2792 Squadron RAF Regiment
- No. 3209 Servicing Commando
- No. 3210 Servicing Commando
- No. 4197 Anti-Aircraft Flight RAF Regiment
- Operational and Refresher Training Unit RAF

== Post War ==
Upon its release from military use, in 1947 the field was leased by the Wiltshire School of Flying, whose engineering arm designed and built numbers of the Thruxton Jackaroo - a four-seat conversion of the de Havilland Tiger Moth. Over the next few years their training fleet was joined at Thruxton by substantial numbers of light aircraft.

Flight training at the airfield is now provided by Western Air (Thruxton) Ltd at what is now known as Thruxton Airport. The southwest end of the former 02/20 secondary runway is now used as an aircraft parking ramp with the airport facilities also being built on the former runway. The northeast end of the runway still exists, but is largely abandoned, with parts of it also used for aircraft parking. The airport uses part of the former main 07/25 wartime runway for takeoffs/ landings. A grass runway was built parallel to the 12/30 secondary runway, the wartime concreted runway being in a deteriorating state and unused.

Thruxton airfield is also the operational airfield for Hampshire and Isle of Wight Air Ambulance service.

Motorcycle racing started in 1950 with the famous Thruxton 500 motorcycle endurance race, followed by cars in 1952. The runway and perimeter roads formed the original circuit until a new track was laid in 1968 utilizing the former airfield perimeter track At 2.356 miles (3.792 km), the new circuit uses only the perimeter road with the addition of a chicane called Club and a series of three tight corners called Campbell, Cobb and Seagrave. All of the loop and pan dispersal areas have been removed.

There is no flying on race days but the airfield is used for flying during practice and test days on the motor circuit.

== See also ==
- List of former Royal Air Force stations
- Thruxton Circuit
