= RAF Tarrant Rushton =

Former Royal Air Force station in Dorset, England

RAF Tarrant Rushton
- Near Blandford Forum, Dorset in England
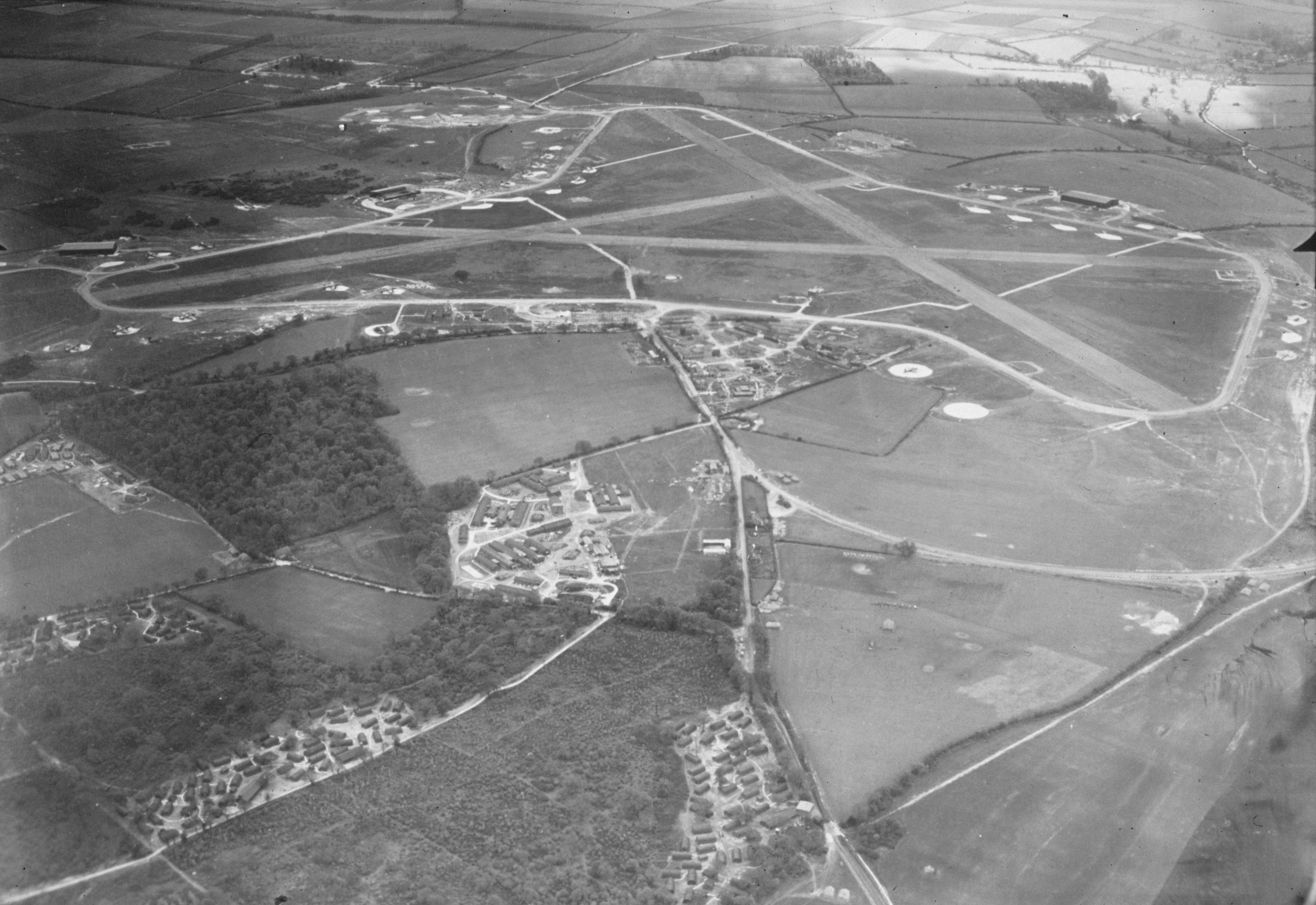
- 1944 Oblique air photo of RAF Tarrant Rushton, looking Northeast to Southwest

Site information
- Type: Royal Air Force station
- Code: TK
- Owner: Ministry of Defence
- Operator: Royal Air Force
- Controlled by: RAF Fighter Command 1943- * No. 38 Group RAF

Location
- Shown within Dorset RAF Tarrant Rushton (the United Kingdom)
- Coordinates: 50°51′00″N 002°04′30″W

Site history
- Built: 1943
- In use: October 1943 - September 1980
- Battles/wars: European theatre of World War II; Cold War

Airfield information
- Elevation: 255 feet (78 m) AMSL
Runways
Direction	Length and surface
00/00	Concrete
00/00	Concrete
00/00	Concrete

Royal Air Force Tarrant Rushton or more simply RAF Tarrant Rushton is a former Royal Air Force station near the village of Tarrant Rushton east of Blandford Forum in Dorset, England from 1943 to 1947. It was used for glider operations during the Second World War and later revived for civilian operations. It is currently disused, though some buildings survive. Today it serves as a visual reference point (VRP) for VFR flights, in particular NW departures from Bournemouth Airport.

== History ==
Building of the airfield commenced in May 1942, the airfield being intended for the use of airborne forces of 38 Wing RAF. On 17 May 1943 the base was handed over while still unfinished. Glider operations started in October 1943 and continued until 1945.

Airspeed Horsa gliders from Tarrant Rushton left for France on the eve of D-Day, to begin Operation Tonga with an action that would later become known as Pegasus Bridge. Among the glider pilots was Jim Wallwork, on a Horsa nicknamed Lady Irene. The Tarrant Rushton gliders landed in occupied France shortly after midnight. Wallwork's aircraft was the first to touch down, but it landed heavily: the force of the impact catapulted both Wallwork and his co-pilot John Ainsworth through the front of the cockpit. Although stunned, this made them the first Allied troops to touch French soil on D-Day.

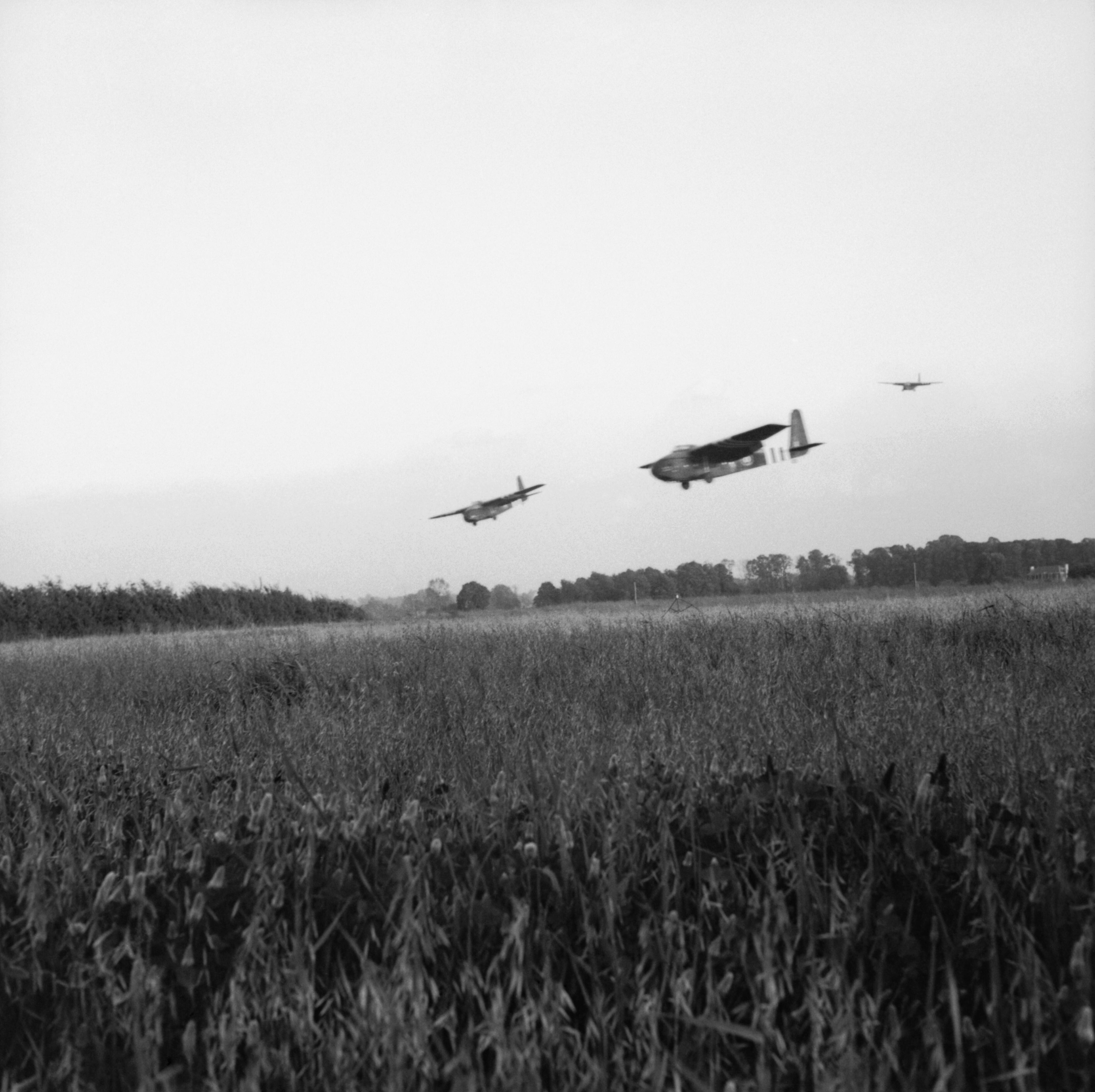
Hamilcar gliders from Tarrant Rushton arrive on Drop Zone 'N' carrying Tetrarch tanks, 6 June 1944.

As part of Operation Tonga, a few Tetrarch tanks of 6th Airborne's Reconnaissance Regiment were also flown from Tarrant Rushton in General Aircraft Hamilcar gliders, towed by Handley Page Halifax bombers, to land on the French coast near the mouth of the Orne river.

Other gliders were later flown from the airfield to Arnhem to take part in Operation Market Garden. During the closing stages of the Second World War, aircraft were used for SOE operations.

In September 1946 the airfield was placed on Care and Maintenance status until abandoned in December 1947. However, 6 months later, in June 1948, Flight Refuelling Ltd arrived to begin 30 years of occupancy. Almost immediately Flight Refuelling became involved in the Berlin Airlift and, between July 1948 and August 1949, carried out nearly 4500 sorties using Avro Lancastrians and Avro Lancasters.

In the following 30 years most activity was centred on conversion of aircraft for in-flight refuelling and drone aircraft development, with FR Aviation refining their "Universal Drone Pack" on aircraft flown from the airfield. The system allowed the test pilot to fly the aircraft from take-off to touch-down using only the push-buttons on a console identical to that of the ground operator of the drone, turning the button pushes into control surface and throttle movements. During this time, Tarrant Rushton was the home of 8 de Havilland Sea Vixens, among them XP924, (now G-CVIX), a Sea Vixen that remained in flying condition for some time.

In the 70s Flight Refuelling left the airfield and flying operations moved to Hurn. After that, it was only used by gliders and occasionally by light aircraft until it was officially closed on 30 September 1980.

A memorial to those who served at the airfield is located by the roadside next to one of the surviving hangars.

== Units ==
- No. 196 Squadron RAF (1944)
- No. 210 Advanced Flying School RAF
- No. 295 Squadron RAF
- No. 297 Squadron RAF
- No. 298 Squadron RAF (1943-45)
- No. 644 Squadron RAF (1944-45)
- No. 1677 (Target Towing) Flight RAF
- No. 2733 Squadron RAF Regiment
- No. 2810 Squadron RAF Regiment
- No. 2851 Squadron RAF Regiment
- Airborne Forces Tactical Development Unit RAF
- Dorset Gliding Club
