= Meiktila Air Base =

Air Base in Myanmar

Meiktila Air Base
- Meiktila, Mandalay Region in Myanmar

Site information
- Type: Air base
- Owner: Tatmadaw
- Operator: Myanmar Air Force
- Controlled by: Central Sector Operations Center

Location
- Shown within Myanmar Meiktila Air Base (Asia)
- Coordinates: 20°53′19″N 095°53′21″E

Site history
- Built: 1942
- In use: 1942 - present
- Battles/wars: South-East Asian theatre of World War II

Meiktila Air Base is an Air base of the Myanmar Air Force, located east of Meiktila, Mandalay Region, Myanmar (Burma).

It is currently home to a squadron operating the Mil Mi-35P, controlled by the Central Sector Operations Center (SOC).

== History ==
The base was formerly RAF Meiktila between 1942 and 1946 used by the Royal Air Force as part of Air Command, South East Asia.

Under ACSEA, Headquarters No. 221 (Tactical) Group RAF was at the airfield between 12 April and June 1945.

The following squadrons were here at some point:

- No. 10 Squadron RAF detachment between October 1945 and June 1946 with the Douglas Dakota
- No. 17 Squadron RAF between 11 and 18 April 1945 with the Supermarine Spitfire VIII
- No. 27 Squadron RAF detachment between November 1944 and April 1945 with the Bristol Beaufighter X
- No. 28 Squadron RAF between 5 April and 22 May 1945 with the Hawker Hurricane IIC
- No. 34 Squadron RAF between 1 July and 18 August 1945 with the Republic Thunderbolt II
- No. 42 Squadron RAF reformed here on 1 July 1945, staying until 30 December 1945 when the squadron was disbanded. It operated the Thunderbolt II
- No. 47 Squadron RAF detachment between April and August 1945 with de Havilland Mosquito VI
- No. 62 Squadron RAF detachment between September 1945 and March 1946 with the Dakota
- No. 79 Squadron RAF between 7 June and 30 December 1945 with the Thunderbolt II
- No. 89 Squadron RAF detachment between August 1944 and February 1945 with the Beaufighter VIF
- No. 113 Squadron RAF between 30 June and 17 August 1945 with the Thunderbolt II
- No. 146 Squadron RAF between 7 June and 1 July 1945 when the squadron was disbanded, it operated the Thunderbolt II
- No. 194 Squadron RAF detachment between March and August 1945 with the Dakota
- No. 298 Squadron RAF detachment between December 1945 and May 1946 with the Handley Page Halifax A.7
- No. 357 Squadron RAF detachment between March and November 1945 with the Westland Lysander IIIA
- No. 656 Squadron RAF between 26 April and 16 May 1945 with the Auster V
- No. 681 Squadron RAF detachment between May 1944 and May 1945 with the Spitfire XI & XIX

The site was also used by multiple RAF units:

- No. 94 Air Stores Park between 17 May and October 1945
- No. 98 Air Stores Park between 17 April and 19 May 1945
- AHQ Burma Communication Flight detachment between April and May 1946
- No. 7 Casualty Air Evacuation Unit between 12 April and 14 May 1945
- No. 8 Casualty Air Evacuation Unit between 15 April and August 1945
- No. 9 Casualty Air Evacuation Unit between 3 and 8 May 1945
- No. 10 Casualty Air Evacuation Unit between 3 and 8 May 1945
- No. 14 Casualty Air Evacuation Unit between 19 and 25 May 1945
- No. 1582 Calibration Flight between 5 and 24 May 1945
- No. 27 Glider Servicing Echelon between 19 May and 5 October 1945
- No. 221 Group Communication Flight between 29 April and 6 June 1945
- No. 154 Maintenance Unit between 26 January and 12 March 1942
- No. 363 Maintenance Unit between 10 and 26 May 1945
- No. 3 Repair & Salvage Unit between 31 July 1945 and 28 March 1946
- No. 148 Repair & Salvage Unit from 23 May 1945
- No. 19 Satellite Airfield HQ between 12 April and 15 November 1945
- No. 181 Wing HQ between 29 April and 3 July 1945
- No. 910 Wing HQ between 7 and 10 June 1945

== See also ==
- List of former Royal Air Force stations
