= RAF Shepherds Grove =

Former Royal Air Force station in Suffolk, England

RAF Shepherds Grove
- Bury St Edmunds, Suffolk in England

Site information
- Type: Royal Air Force station
- Code: HP
- Owner: Ministry of Defence
- Operator: Royal Air Force; United States Air Force
- Controlled by: RAF Bomber Command 1944-45 * No. 38 Group RAF; RAF Fighter Command 1945

Location
- Shown within Suffolk RAF Shepherds Grove (the United Kingdom)
- Coordinates: 52°18′55″N 000°55′13″E
- Grid reference: TM990730

Site history
- Built: 1943/44
- In use: April 1944 - July 1963
- Battles/wars: European theatre of World War II

Airfield information
- Elevation: 200 feet (61 m) AMSL
Runways
Direction	Length and surface
01/19	1,845 metres (6,053 ft) Concrete
08/26	1,220 metres (4,003 ft) Concrete
14/32	1,200 metres (3,937 ft) Concrete

Royal Air Force Shepherds Grove or more simply RAF Shepherds Grove is a former Royal Air Force station located in Suffolk, active from 1943–44 to 1966. Shepherds Grove was host to units of the United States Army Air Forces, Eighth Air Force. During the Cold war it was also one of the 20 Thor IRBM missile bases in the UK, as part of Project Emily.

== Units ==
The following units were here at some point:

- 78th Fighter-Bomber Squadron between 1952–1956 and 1957–1958
- No. 82 Squadron RAF between 22 July 1959 and 10 July 1963 with Thor
- No. 196 Squadron RAF between 26 January 1945 and 16 March 1946 with the Short Stirling IV & V
- No. 299 Squadron RAF between 25 January 1945 and 15 February 1946 with the Stirling IV & V
- No. 1657 Heavy Conversion Unit RAF (May - October 1944)
- No. 1677 (Target Towing) Flight RAF (January - April 1945)
- Detachment of the Air Despatch Letter Service Squadron (4 - 15 March 1946)
- Flying Wing of the Radio Warfare Establishment (June - September 1946) became the Flying Wing of the Central Signals Establishment (September 1946 - October 1948)

== See also ==
- List of former Royal Air Force stations
- United States Air Forces in Europe
- United States Air Force in the United Kingdom
