= RAF Stoney Cross =

Former RAF airfield in Hampshire, England

RAF Stoney Cross USAAF Station AAF-452
- Near Southampton, Hampshire in England
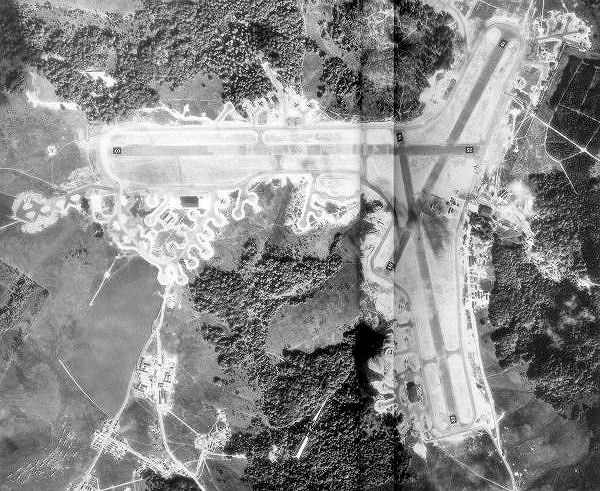
- Aerial Photo Mosaic of Stoney Cross Airfield - 5 September 1943 while additional construction of dispersal hardstands and taxiways on the southwest side of the 07/25 runway. From the air, Stoney Cross was very distinctive, the spur shape being dictated by the terrain on which it was built. The airfield was first planned as an emergency landing ground equipped with facilities. While under construction, the design was changed several times and eventually became a fully equipped airfield and station.

Site information
- Type: Royal Air Force station
- Code: SS
- Owner: Air Ministry
- Operator: Royal Air Force; United States Army Air Forces
- Controlled by: RAF Army Cooperation Command; 1942-43; RAF Fighter Command; 1943-44 * No. 10 Group RAF; RAF Transport Command 1944- Ninth Air Force 1944

Location
- Shown within Hampshire RAF Stoney Cross (the United Kingdom)
- Coordinates: 50°55′08″N 001°39′36″W

Site history
- Built: 1942
- Built by: George Wimpey & Co Ltd
- In use: November 1943 - January 1948
- Battles/wars: European theatre of World War II

Airfield information
- Elevation: 373 feet (114 m) AMSL
Runways
Direction	Length and surface
00/00	Concrete
00/00	Concrete
00/00	Concrete

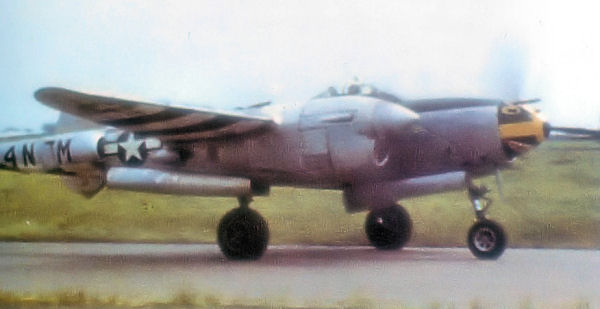
Lockheed P-38 Lightning of the 394th Fighter Squadron wearing D-Day invasion markings, June 1944.

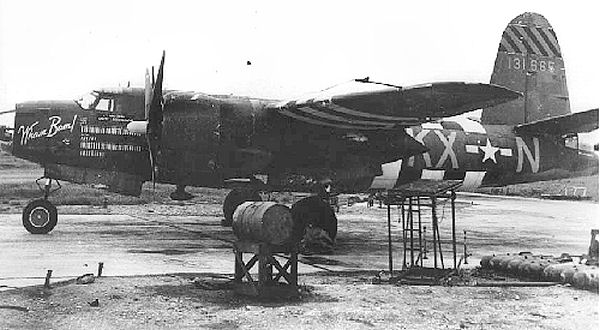
Martin B-26B-15-MA Marauder Serial 41-31665 of the 558th Bomb Squadron

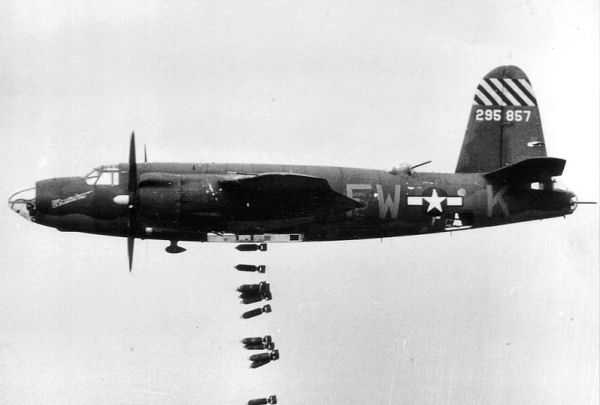
Martin B-26B-50-MA Marauder Serial 42-95857 of the 556th Bomb Squadron

Royal Air Force Stoney Cross or more simply RAF Stoney Cross is a former Royal Air Force station in the New Forest, Hampshire, England. The airfield is located approximately 4 miles (6.4 km) northwest of Lyndhurst and 11 miles (18 km) west of Southampton.

Opened in 1942, it served both the Royal Air Force and United States Army Air Forces. During the war it functioned primarily as a combat bomber and fighter airfield. It closed in January 1948.

Today the remains of the airfield sit on New Forest Crown land managed by the Forestry Commission.

== Royal Air Force use ==
Stoney Cross opened in November 1942 and served the Royal Air Force and United States Army Air Forces Ninth Air Force.

The following units were here at some point:

- No. 26 (South African) Squadron RAF
- No. 46 Squadron RAF
- No. 175 Squadron RAF (1943)
- No. 232 Squadron RAF
- No. 239 Squadron RAF
- No. 242 (Canadian) Squadron RAF
- No. 243 Squadron RAF
- No. 296 Squadron RAF
- No. 297 Squadron RAF (1943-44)
- No. 299 Squadron RAF (1943-44)

Units

- No. 123 Airfield Headquarters RAF
- No. 1308 Mobile Wing RAF Regiment
- No. 1552 (Radio Aids Training) Flight RAF
- No. 1 Section from No. 1552 (Radio Aids Training) Flight RAF
- No. 2720 Squadron RAF Regiment
- No. 2749 Squadron RAF Regiment
- No. 2750 Squadron RAF Regiment
- No. 2811 Squadron RAF Regiment
- No. 2812 Squadron RAF Regiment
- No. 4094 Anti-Aircraft Flight RAF Regiment
- No. 4109 Anti-Aircraft Flight RAF Regiment

== USAAF use ==
Stoney Cross was known as USAAF Station AAF-452 for security reasons during the war, and by which it was referred to instead of location. Its USAAF Station Code was "SS".

=== 367th Fighter Group ===
The 367th Fighter Group arrived from Oakland Municipal Airport, California flying Lockheed P-38 Lightnings. They had the following fighter squadrons and fuselage codes:

- 392d Fighter Squadron (H5)
- 393d Fighter Squadron (8L)
- 394th Fighter Squadron (4N)

The 367th was a group of Ninth Air Force's 70th Fighter Wing, IX Tactical Air Command. On 6 July the 367th Fighter was moved to nearby RAF Ibsley to make way for the 387th Bomb Group.

=== 387th Bombardment Group (Medium) ===
With the fighters moved to Ibsley, the Martin B-26 Marauders of the 387th Bombardment Group moved to Stoney Cross from RAF Chipping Ongar on 25 June 1944. They had the following bomber squadrons and fuselage codes:

- 556th Bombardment Squadron (FW)
- 557th Bombardment Squadron (KS)
- 558th Bombardment Squadron (KX)
- 559th Bombardment Squadron (TQ)

The 387th was a group of Ninth Air Force's 98th Bombardment Wing, IX Bomber Command. By 1 September the group was able to move across the English Channel to its Advanced Landing Ground at a captured Luftwaffe airfield, Maupertus-sur-Mer Airfield, France (A-15).

== Civil use ==
Upon its release from military use, the airfield stood neglected. The Forestry Commission, who have managed the crown lands of the New Forest since 1924, took over the management of the site upon its closure. Runways were broken up in the 1960s, putting an end to their use for informal driving lessons, to meet demands for hardcore in the area and most of the usable buildings were sold. The final remaining structure - the water tower - was removed in 2004.

At present a minor C road runs along the length of the main 25/07 runway as a right of way. The other two runways are still clearly visible in aerial photography, although the concrete has been removed. The eastern perimeter road is also in use as a C road. The Forestry Commission has established car parks on three dispersal pans and two campsites make use of other former dispersal sites alongside the eastern 33/15 runway. Almost all of the other dispersal hardstands have been removed, although a few survive in a deteriorated condition. There is a small marker along one of the roads as a memorial to the former airfield and an interpretation board at one of the car parks.

From 1951 to 1954 the accommodation site at Longbeech was used by New Forest District council to house families waiting for council housing. The site had grocery, doctor's surgery, library, and hall which doubled up as a cinema at the weekends. The site was vacated by 1955.

In 1986 RAF Stoney Cross hit the national news when a Hampshire Constabulary-led police operation evicted a large group of Peace Convoy travellers from the airfield site. BBC2 recorded the week-long occupation leading to an early-morning eviction in the documentary 'Seven Days At Stoney Cross (1986)

The concrete roads in Longbeech still exist but those on the remainder of the airfield that had survived the earlier 'blitz' were removed in the 1990s.

== See also ==
- List of former Royal Air Force stations
