= No. 190 Squadron RAF =

Defunct flying squadron of the Royal Air Force

- Official squadron badge
- Active: 24 Oct 1917 – Apr 1919; 1 Mar 1943 – 31 Dec 1943; 5 Jan 1944 – 21 Jan 1946
- Country: United Kingdom
- Branch: Royal Air Force
- Role: Convoy escort Airborne forces Transport
- Part of: No. 38 Group RAF
- Motto(s): Latin: Ex Tenebris (Translation: "Through darkness")

Commanders
- Notable commanders: Geoffrey Harry "Buster" Briggs

Insignia
- Squadron Badge heraldry: A cloak charged with a double-headed eagle displayed
- Squadron Codes: G5 (Jan 1944 – Dec 1945); L9 (Jan 1944 – Dec 1945)

No. 190 Squadron was a Royal Air Force squadron with a relatively short existence, but a very broad career. It served as a trainer squadron during the first World War and as convoy escort, airborne support and transport squadron during World War II.

== History ==
=== Formation in World War I ===
No 190 Squadron was formed at Rochford, England on 24 October 1917 as a night training squadron operating amongst others the Royal Aircraft Factory BE.2e and the Airco DH.6. The squadron moved to RAF Newmarket, Suffolk on 14 March 1918 and was disbanded a year later at RAF Upwood in April 1919.

=== Reformation with Coastal Command ===
The squadron was re-formed on 1 March 1943 at Sullom Voe, Scotland. The squadron operated the Consolidated Catalina to patrol the North Atlantic. The first U-boat was sunk in the first month of operations. The main role of the squadron was protecting the convoys to and from Russia ("Operation Locomotive"). The squadron disbanded on 31 December 1943, when it was re-numbered to 210 Squadron.

=== Airborne Forces squadron ===
The squadron was re-formed again five days later, on 5 January 1944 at RAF Leicester East as an airborne support unit flying the Short Stirling. It became part of 38 Group on 6 November 1943. On 6 June 1944 the squadron first carried 426 paratroopers to Caen, France. The squadron then returned and the next night towed 18 Airspeed Horsa gliders into France. It moved to RAF Fairford and carried out supply-dropping missions to the advancing troops and SOE operatives. The squadron involvement in supply drops at Battle of Arnhem caused 11 aircraft losses in 3 days. The next move was to RAF Great Dunmow where it towed gliders for the Rhine crossing and paratroopers into the Netherlands to disrupt the German retreat.

=== On Halifaxes as Transport Squadron ===
As the war ended the squadron re-equipped with the Handley Page Halifax which it used as a freighter for Transport Command until the end of 1945. It was disbanded at Great Dunmow on 21 January 1946 by being renumbered to 295 Squadron.

== Aircraft operated ==
Aircraft operated by No 190 Squadron RAF, data from
From	To	Aircraft	Variant
October 1917	January 1919	Royal Aircraft Factory B.E.2	c
October 1917	January 1919	Royal Aircraft Factory B.E.2	e
October 1917	January 1919	Airco DH.6	
October 1917	January 1919	AVRO 504	K
February 1943	December 1943	Consolidated Catalina	Mk.Ib
October 1943	December 1943	Consolidated Catalina	Mk.IV
January 1944	June 1945	Short Stirling	Mk.IV
May 1945	January 1946	Handley Page Halifax	Mks.III and VII

== Squadron stations ==
Stations and airfields used by No 190 Squadron RAF, data from
From	To	Base
2 October 1917	14 March 1918	RFC Rochford, Essex
14 March 1918	5 October 1918	RAF Newmarket, Suffolk
5 October 1918	April 1919	RAF Upwood, Cambridgeshire
1 March 1943	31 December 1943	RAF Sullom Voe, Shetland Islands, Scotland
5 January 1944	25 March 1944	RAF Leicester East, Leicestershire
25 March 1944	14 October 1944	RAF Fairford, Gloucestershire
14 October 1944	21 January 1946	RAF Great Dunmow, Essex

== Commanding officers ==
Officers commanding No 190 Squadron, data from
From	To	Name
1 March 1943	31 December 1943	W/Cdr. P.H. Alington, DFC
5 January 1944	21 September 1944	W/Cdr. G.E. Harrison, DFC, SS(US)
2 October 1944	20 April 1945	W/Cdr. R.H. Bunker, DSO, DFC & Bar
24 April 1945	1 July 1945	W/Cdr. G.H. Briggs, DFC
1 July 1945	21 January 1946	W/Cdr. L.C. Bartram

== See also ==
- No 38 Group RAF
- List of Royal Air Force aircraft squadrons
