= No. 295 Squadron RAF =

Flying squadron of the Royal Air Force

- Active: 3 August 1942 – 21 January 1946; 21 January 1946 – 31 March 1946; 10 September 1947 – 31 October 1948
- Country: United Kingdom
- Branch: Royal Air Force
- Role: Airborne forces and Transport
- Part of: No 38 Group RAF
- Mottos: Latin: In caelo auxilium (Translation: "Aid from the skies")

Insignia
- Squadron Badge heraldry: A hand manacled and couped at the wrist holding a sword in its scabbard in bend sinister
- Squadron Codes: PX (Aug 1942 – Nov 1943); 8Z (Nov 1943 – Jan 1946 ('A' Flt)); 8E (Feb 1944 – Jan 1946 ('B' Flt))

No 295 Squadron RAF was an airborne forces and transport squadron of the Royal Air Force during World War II. It was the first unit to be equipped with the Armstrong Whitworth Albemarle transport and glider tug aircraft.

== History ==
=== With the Airborne Forces ===
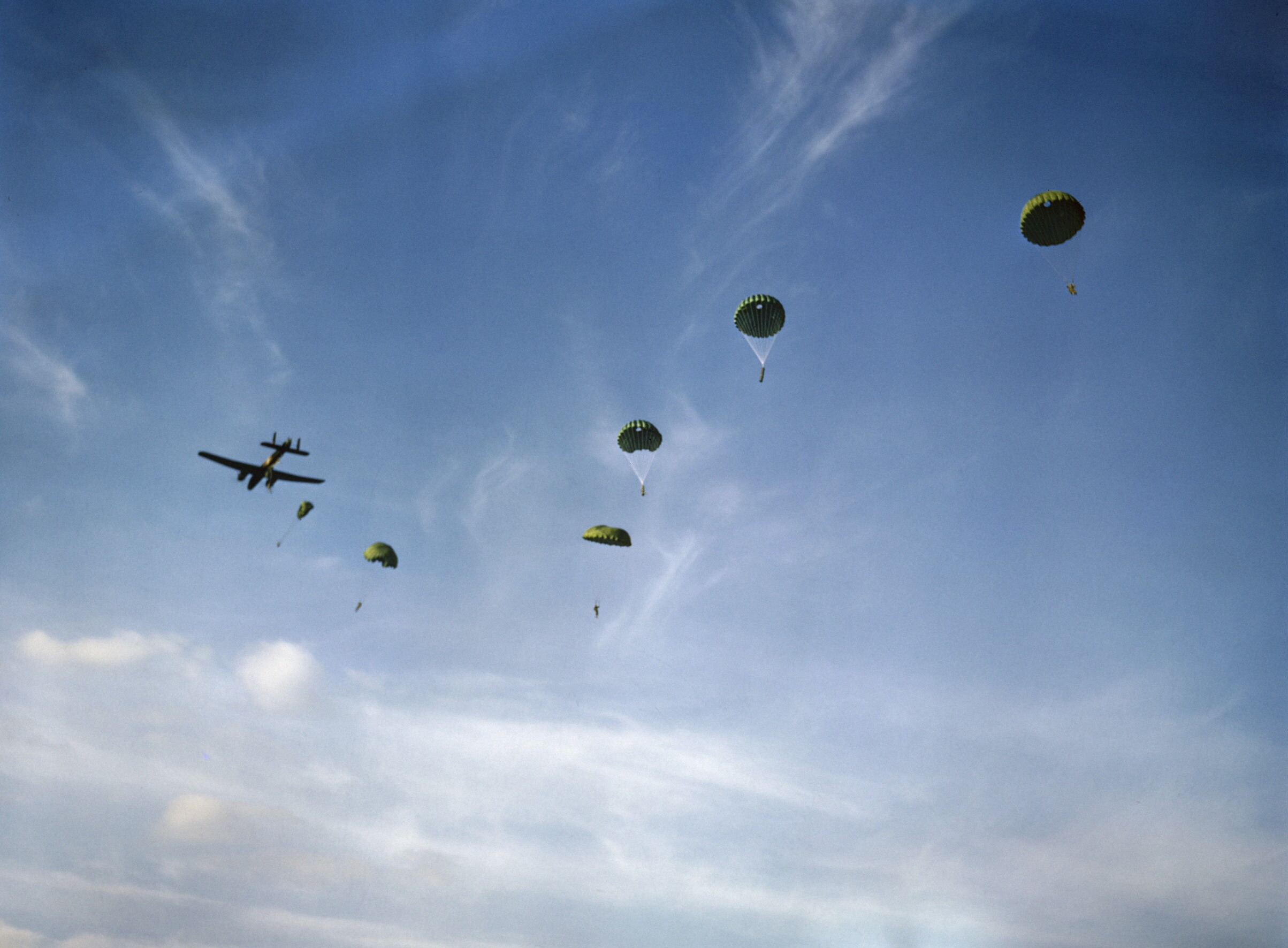
Paratroopers dropping out of a No. 295 Squadron Whitley, October 1942

No. 295 Squadron was formed on 3 August 1942 at RAF Netheravon as an airborne forces unit, equipped with Whitley Mk.Vs. These were from November 1942 used in leaflet dropping missions over France, supplemented in February 1943 with Halifax Mk.Vs, which they used in Operation Beggar. By October 1943 the squadron converted to the Albemarle Mk.I. With these aircraft the squadron shared – with 570 Sqn. – the honour of being the first to drop troops over Normandy on the eve of D-Day, while other aircraft of the squadron towed gliders to the landing zones. The Albemarles gave way in July 1944 to the Stirling Mk.IV. The squadron used these aircraft during the Battle of Arnhem during Operation Market Garden, again towing gliders.

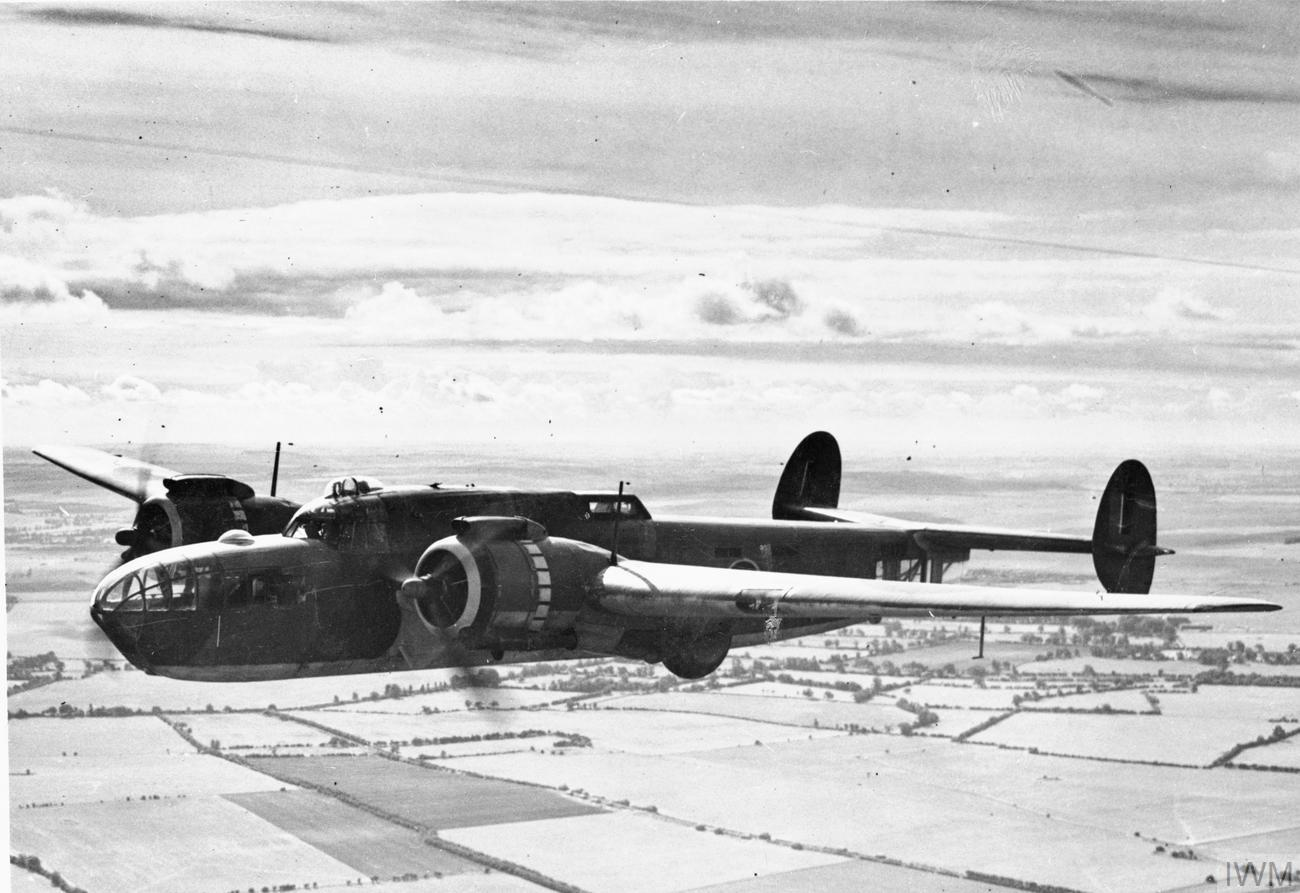
An example of the Armstrong Whitworth Albemarle as used by No. 295 Squadron

In early October 1944, the Short Stirlings of No. 295 Squadron took up residence at RAF Rivenhall, with most of its operations consisting of supply drops to Norwegian resistance forces and similar activities over the Netherlands and Denmark. The last assault action with the Stirlings was on 24 March 1945, when the unit took part in Operation Varsity, the crossing of the Rhine. The Stirlings further provided service carrying troops to Norway to disarm the Germans there when the war was over. The squadron was disbanded at Rivenhall on 14 January 1946.

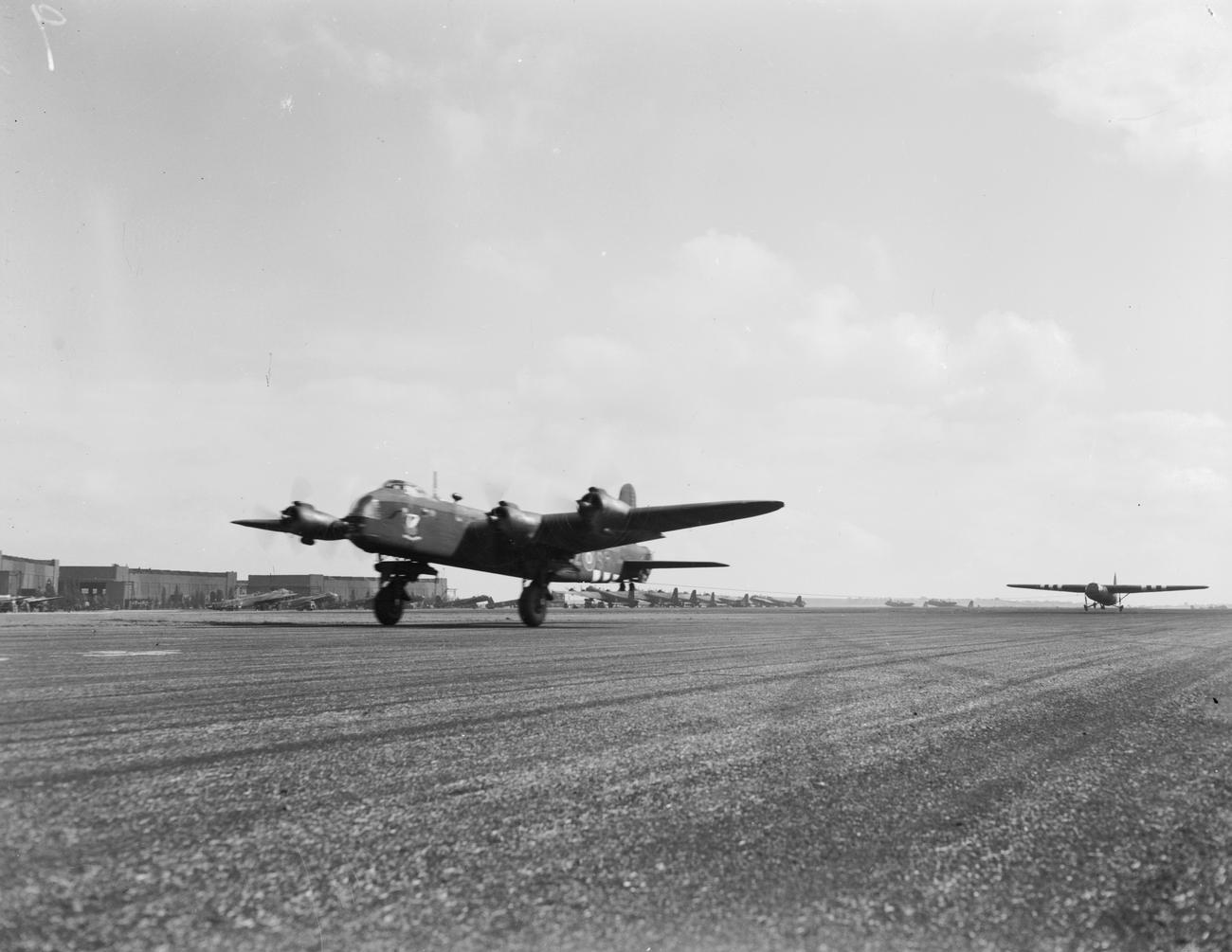
A Short Stirling bomber taking off from RAF Harwell, Oxfordshire with a Horsa glider in tow for Operation Market Garden, 17 September 1944

=== With Transport Command ===
On 21 January 1946 No. 190 Squadron was renumbered to No. 295 Squadron as a Transport Squadron (Rawlings claims 1 February, and does not mention the renumbering), flying Halifaxes of the A.7 type. It was soon disbanded however, on 1 April 1946 at RAF Tarrant Rushton, the same airfield where it had been reformed and renumbered to No. 297 Squadron.

=== With the Airborne Forces again ===
The squadron was reformed again as an airborne forces squadron on 10 September 1947 at RAF Fairford, again flying Halifaxes, but now the A.9 type. After a little more than a year it disbanded again, at Fairford on 1 October 1948.

== Aircraft operated ==
Aircraft operated by No. 295 Squadron
From	To	Aircraft	Variant
August 1942	November 1943	Armstrong Whitworth Whitley	Mk.V
February 1943	November 1943	Handley Page Halifax	Mk.V
October 1943	July 1944	Armstrong Whitworth Albemarle	Mk.I
November 1943	July 1944	Armstrong Whitworth Albemarle	Mk.I
April 1944	July 1944	Armstrong Whitworth Albemarle	Mk.V
June 1944	January 1946	Short Stirling	Mk.IV
January 1946	March 1946	Handley Page Halifax	A.7
September 1947	October 1948	Handley Page Halifax	A.9

== Squadron airfields ==
Airfields used by No. 295 Squadron
From	To	Station	Remark
3 August 1942	1 May 1943	RAF Netheravon, Wiltshire	Det. at RAF Hurn, Dorset
1 May 1943	30 June 1943	RAF Holmsley South, Hampshire	
30 June 1943	15 March 1944	RAF Hurn, Dorset	
15 March 1944	11 October 1944	RAF Harwell, (then) Berkshire	Det. at RAF Ayr, Ayrshire, Scotland
11 October 1944	21 January 1946	RAF Rivenhall, Essex	
21 January 1946	1 April 1946	RAF Tarrant Rushton, Dorset	
10 September 1947	1 October 1948	RAF Fairford, Gloucestershire	

== Commanding officers ==
Officers Commanding No. 295 Squadron
From	To	Name
3 August 1942	29 August 1942	Sqn Ldr A.B Wilkinson, DFC(US) (Acting)
29 August 1942	1 January 1943	Wg Cdr G.P. Marvin
1 January 1943	19 February 1943	Wing Commander P.V.M. Lysaght (acting) KIA – Saumur, France
19 February 1943	March 1943	Squadron Leader L.C. Bartram (acting)
March 1943	14 September 1944	Wing Commander B.R. Macnamara, OPW2(USSR)
14 September 1944	November 1945	Wing Commander H.E. 'Pluto' Angell, DFC
November 1945	14 January 1946	Wing Commander R.N. Stidolph
