= No. 297 Squadron RAF =

Former flying squadron of the Royal Air Force

No. 297 Squadron
- Active: 22 January 1942 – 1 April 1946; 1 April 1946 – 15 November 1950
- Country: United Kingdom
- Branch: Royal Air Force
- Role: Airborne forces Transport
- Part of: No. 38 Group
- Engagements: Sicily, Normandy, Arnhem

Insignia
- Squadron Codes: P5 (Jul 1943 – 1945); L5 (Apr 1944 – 1946)

No 297 Squadron was a squadron of the Royal Air Force. It was notable for being the first airborne forces squadron formed. With sister No. 296 Squadron it formed No. 38 Wing in January 1942, joined in August by No. 295 Squadron; the wing expanded in 1943 to become No. 38 Group. The squadron saw action in Sicily and took part in the D-Day invasion and Operation Market Garden. It was disbanded in 1950.

== History ==
=== Formation and World War II ===
The squadron originally formed as the Parachute Exercise Squadron at RAF Ringway on 15 December 1941 and moved to RAF Netheravon on 22 January 1942, then officially becoming No 297 Squadron RAF. In February 1942 they were equipped with Whitley Mark V aircraft. The squadron moved to RAF Hurn on 5 June 1942 and to RAF Thruxton on 24 October 1942. In July 1943 the squadron was equipped with the first of the Albemarle Mk. I aircraft, which they kept until December 1944 while being supplemented with the Albemarle Mk. II in February 1944, the Albemarle Mk. V in April 1944 and the Albemarle Mk. VI in July 1944. In 1943 the squadron flew Albemarles to Algeria to take part in Operation Husky, the invasion of Sicily, returning to Britain the same year.

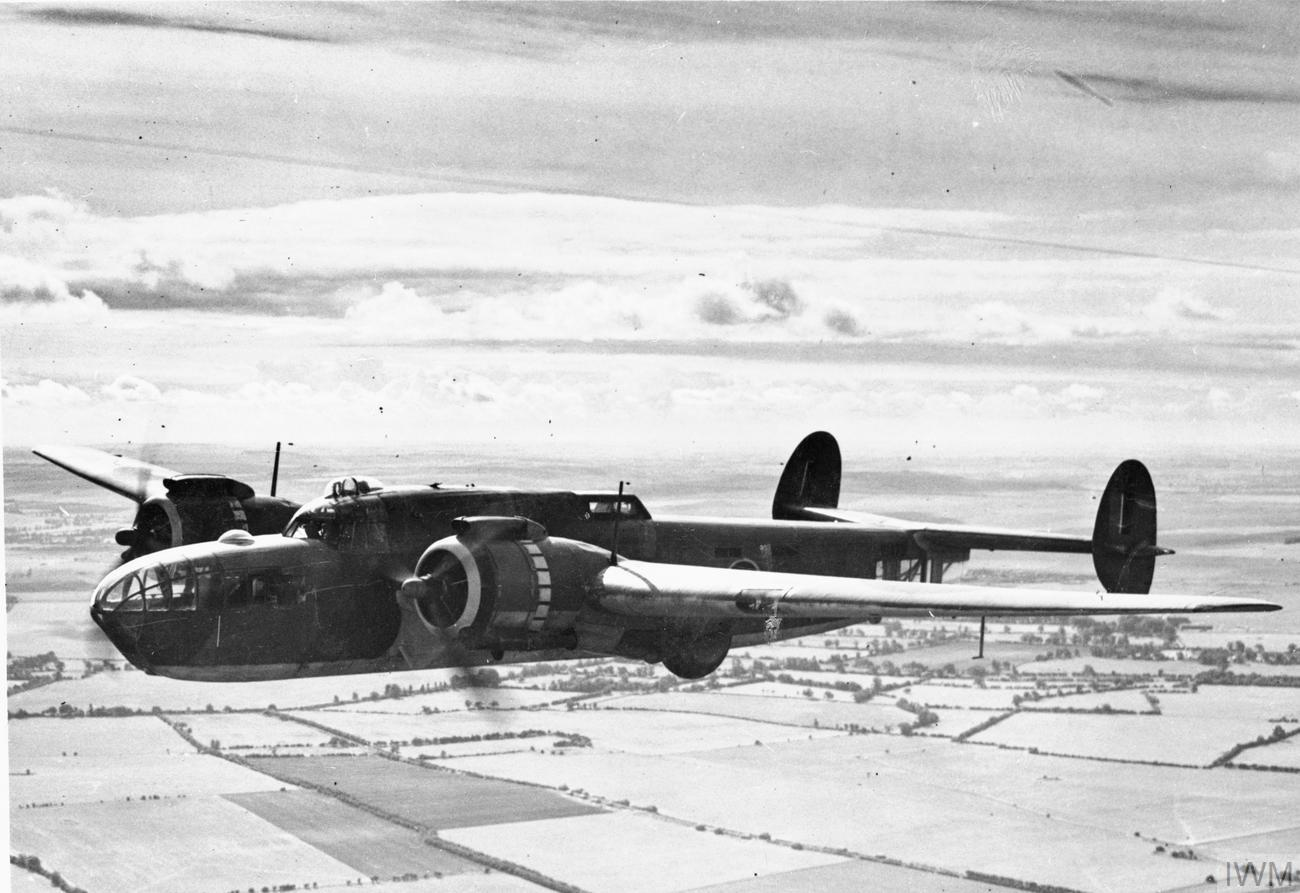
An example of the Armstrong Whitworth Albemarle as used by No. 297 Squadron

The squadron moved to RAF Station Stoney Cross on 25 August 1943, where they practiced parachute drops with the 8th Battalion, Parachute Regiment and 22 independent parachute regiment in preparation for the D-Day invasion. They then moved to RAF Station Brize Norton on 14 March 1944 to practice towing Horsa gliders in preparation for the capture of the Caen canal and Orne river bridges (now known as Pegasus Bridge) and the Merville Battery located on the Normandy coast overlooking Sword Beach. Their involvement in the D-Day operation was:

- At 11:00 PM on Mon 5 June 1944 four Albemarles dropped ten men of the 22nd Independent Parachute Company and thirty paratroopers comprising the Advance Party of the 5th Parachute Brigade near Ranville
- Later that night nine Albemarles dropped paratroops of the 5th Parachute Brigade as part of the main force
- At 3:30 AM on D-Day itself a further 8 Horsa gliders were towed to the drop zone
- Three Horsas were towed over manned by elements of 9th Parachute Battalion and engineers of the 591st Parachute Squadron to attack and silence the Merville Battery.
- Later that day 19 more Horsas were towed across. One aircraft was shot down.

In September 1944 the squadron played its part in Operation Market Garden after temporarily moving to RAF Station Manston. They towed 29 Horsa and 2 Waco gliders in the first wave and 24 Horsas in the second, all without loss. On 30 September 1944 the squadron moved to RAF Station Earls Colne where the process of changing the Albemarles for the Halifax Mk.V was started, the squadron received additional Halifax Mk.III aircraft in February 1945 and Halifax A.7 in December 1945. On 24 March 1945 thirty Halifax aircraft towed Horsas manned with 6th Airborne paratroops to effect a successful Rhine crossing. The squadron was disbanded on 1 April 1946.

=== Post-war ===
The squadron was reformed in a peacetime role on 1 April 1946 at RAF Station Tarrant Rushton and merged with No. 295 Squadron, keeping the markings of No. 297 Squadron. The reformed squadron kept the Halifax A.7 aircraft and moved to RAF Brize Norton on 5 September 1946. In January 1947 it was re-equipped with Halifax A.9 aircraft which they kept until October 1948, during this time they moved to RAF Station Fairford on 21 August 1947 and to RAF Station Dishforth on 1 November 1948. In November 1948 the squadron was equipped with Hastings C.1 aircraft until November 1950. During this time the squadron moved as a detachment to Schleswig returning to RAF Station Topcliffe on 22 August 1949 where they stayed until 15 November 1950 when the squadron was disbanded.

== Aircraft operated ==
Aircraft operated by No. 297 Squadron
From	To	Aircraft	Variant
January 1942	March 1942	de Havilland Tiger Moth	Mk.II
February 1942	February 1944	Armstrong Whitworth Whitley	Mk.V
July 1943	December 1944	Armstrong Whitworth Albemarle	Mk.I
February 1944	December 1944	Armstrong Whitworth Albemarle	Mk.II
April 1944	December 1944	Armstrong Whitworth Albemarle	Mk.V
July 1944	December 1944	Armstrong Whitworth Albemarle	Mk.VI
October 1944	February 1945	Handley Page Halifax	Mk.V
February 1945	April 1946	Handley Page Halifax	Mk.III
December 1945	March 1947	Handley Page Halifax	A.7
January 1947	October 1948	Handley Page Halifax	A.9
November 1948	November 1950	Handley Page Hastings	C.1

== Squadron station ==
Stations and airfields used by No. 297 Squadron
From	To	Station	Remark
22 January 1942	5 June 1942	RAF Netheravon, Wiltshire	
5 June 1942	24 October 1942	RAF Hurn, Dorset	
24 October 1942	25 August 1943	RAF Thruxton, Hampshire	
25 August 1943	14 March 1944	RAF Stoney Cross, Hampshire	
14 March 1944	30 September 1944	RAF Brize Norton, Oxfordshire	
30 September 1944	1 April 1946	RAF Earls Colne, Essex	
1 April 1946	5 September 1946	RAF Tarrant Rushton, Dorset	No. 295 Squadron RAF renumbered
5 September 1946	21 August 1947	RAF Brize Norton, Oxfordshire	
21 August 1947	1 November 1948	RAF Fairford, Gloucestershire	
1 November 1948	22 August 1949	RAF Dishforth, North Yorkshire	Det. at RAF Schleswigland, Germany for Berlin air lift
22 August 1949	15 November 1950	RAF Topcliffe, North Yorkshire	

== Commanding officers ==
Officers Commanding No. 297 Squadron
From	To	Name
22 January 1942	27 April 1942	W/Cdr. B.A. Oakley
27 April 1942	1 February 1943	W/Cdr. R.B. Wardman, AFC
1 February 1943	13 August 1943	W/Cdr. G.F.K. Donaldson, DFC, AFC, DFC(US)
13 August 1943	31 August 1943	W/Cdr. N.B. Hallmark, AFC (acting)
31 August 1943	4 November 1943	W/Cdr. R.W.G. Kitley
4 November 1943	29 December 1943	S/Ldr. P.B.N. Davis, DSO
29 December 1943	14 September 1944	W/Cdr. J.G. Minifie
14 September 1944	4 December 1944	W/Cdr. J.R. Grice
4 December 1944	1946	W/Cdr. E.G. Dean, DFC

== See also ==
- No. 38 Group RAF
- List of Royal Air Force aircraft squadrons
