= Helwan Airfield =

Helwan Airfield Helwan Martial Airfield RAF Helwan
- Arabic: مطار حلوان
- Helwan, Cairo Governorate in Egypt

Site information
- Type: Airfield
- Operator: Egyptian Air Force

Location
- Shown within Egypt
- Coordinates: 29°49′18″N 31°19′49″E

Site history
- Built: 1919
- In use: 1919 - present

Airfield information
- Elevation: 41 metres (135 ft) AMSL
Runways
Direction	Length and surface
03L/21R	2,902 metres (9,521 ft) Asphalt
03R/21L	3,006 metres (9,862 ft) Asphalt

Helwan Airfield is a Aerodrome located near Helwan, Cairo Governorate, Egypt. It was formerly RAF Helwan, a Royal Air Force station operational up to and during World War II.

== History ==
During World War II, it was evacuated by RAF fighters due to its runway conditions. It had accommodations for 500 personnel, 32,000 gallons of aviation gas, and 3 hangars. In 1958, Helwan Airfield was used in conjunction with nearby aircraft industry.

== Units ==
The following RAF squadrons were here at some point:

- No. 6 Squadron RAF between 13 and 22 January 1942 with the Gloster Gladiator I & II, Westland Lysander I & II, Hawker Hurricane I and Bristol Blenheim IV
- No. 8 Squadron RAF between 18 October and 11 December 1920 with the Airco DH.9A
- No. 11 Squadron RAF between 1 December 1940 and 28 January 1941 with the Blenheim I & IV
- Detachment from No. 18 Squadron RAF between January and March 1942 with the Blenheim IV
- No. 29 Squadron RAF between 20 July and 6 August 1936 with the Fairey Gordon
- Detachment from No. 30 Squadron RAF between June and November 1940 with the Blenheim IF
- No. 33 Squadron RAF initially between 24 April and 25 May 1939 with the Gladiator I, then between 25 June and 22 September 1940 with the Gladiator II and Hurricane I
- No. 39 Squadron RAF between 1 December 1940 and 23 January 1941 with the Blenheim I
- No. 45 Squadron RAF initially between 1 April and 11 July 1921 with the DH.9A, then between 21 October 1927 and 3 January 1939 with the Fairey IIIF, Hawker Hart, Vickers Vincent, Gordon, Vickers Wellesley.
- No. 47 Squadron RAF between 1 February and 1920 and 21 October 1927 with the DH.9A
- No. 55 Squadron RAF initially between 3 June and 1 July 1941 with the Blenheim V then between 22 March and 3 April 1942 with the Blenheim IV
- No. 70 Squadron RAF between 30 August 1939 and 11 June 1940 with the Vickers Valentia
- No. 74 Squadron RAF between 21 June and 8 July 1942 with the Supermarine Spitfire VB
- No. 80 Squadron RAF between 16 January and 15 July 1939 with the Gladiator I
- No. 112 Squadron RAF between 26 May 1939 and 19 July 1940 with the Gladiator I & II
- No. 113 Squadron RAF between 23 and 30 December 1941 with the Blenheim IV
- No. 134 Squadron RAF between 9 June and 6 July 1942 without any aircraft
- Detachment from No. 142 Squadron RAF between October 1935 and August 1936
- No. 145 Squadron RAF between 30 April and 25 May 1942 with the Spitfire VB
- No. 206 Squadron RAF between 27 June 1919 and 1 February 1920 with the DH.9
- Detachment from No. 208 Squadron RAF between April 1936 and September 1938 with the Hawker Audax
- No. 211 Squadron RAF between 12 May 1938 and 31 January 1939 with the Hawker Hind
- No. 318 "City of Gdańsk" Polish Fighter-Reconnaissance Squadron RAF between 23 and 24 April 1944 with the Spitfire VB
- No. 601 (County of London) Squadron AAF between 11 and 22 August 1942 with the Spitfire VC

== See also ==
- List of North African airfields during World War II
