= Robert Bateson (RAF officer) =

Royal Air Force Air Vice-Marshal (1912-1986)

Robert Norman Bateson
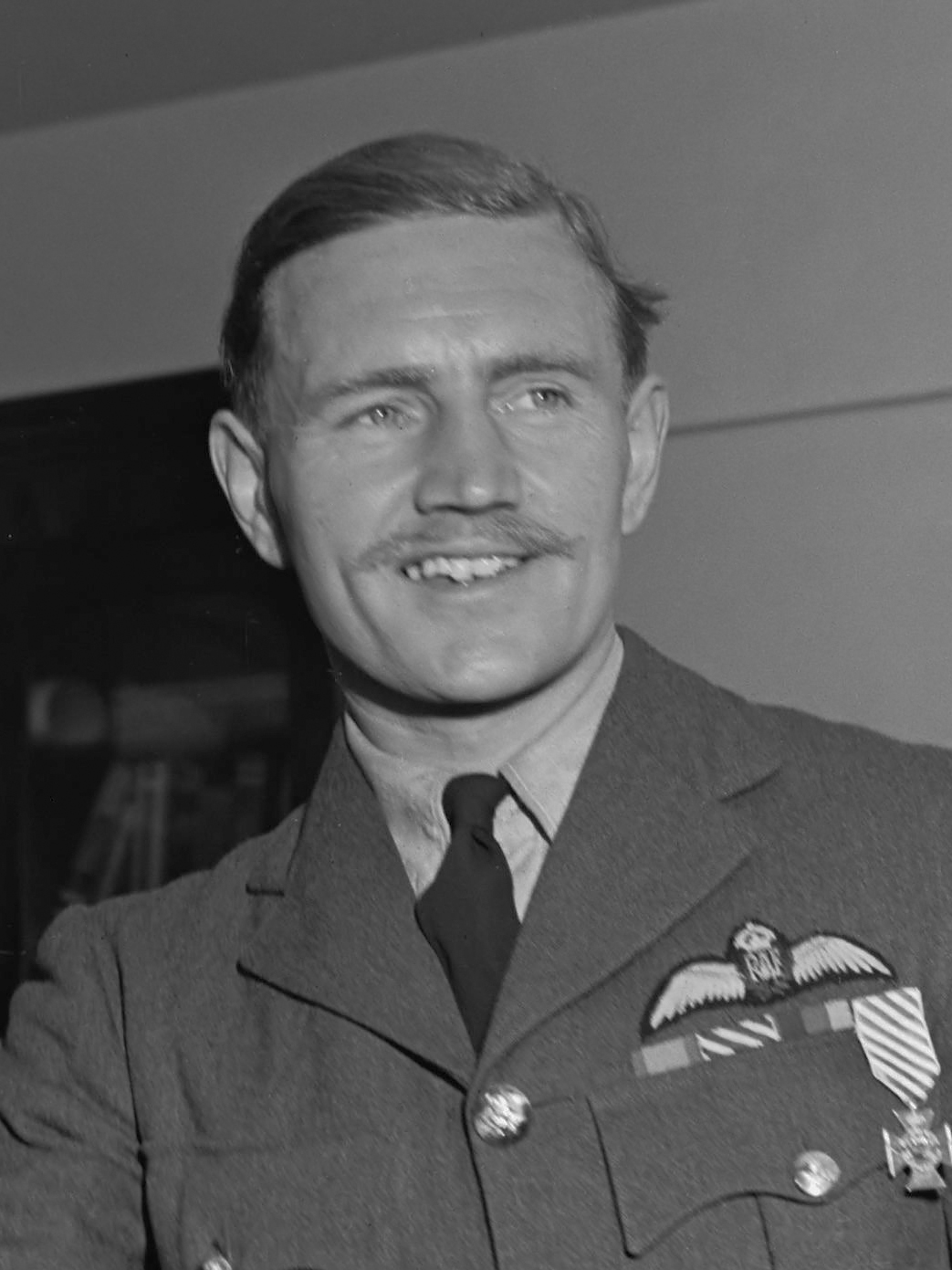
- Wing Commander Robert Bateson after being awarded the Dutch Airman's Cross in 1944
- Born: 10 June 1912; Lewes, Sussex
- Died: 6 March 1986 (aged 73); Tavistock, Devon
- Military career
- Allegiance: United Kingdom
- Branch: Royal Air Force
- Service years: 1936–1967
- Rank: Air Vice Marshal
- Service number: 39054
- Commands: No. 12 Group RAF (1961–63); RAF Duxford (1951–54); RAF Gütersloh (1945–46); No. 140 Wing RAF (1944–46); No. 613 Squadron RAF (1944); No. 11 Squadron RAF (1942); No. 211 Squadron RAF (1942)
- Conflicts: Second World War
- Awards: Companion of the Order of the Bath; Distinguished Service Order & Bar; Distinguished Flying Cross; Airman's Cross (Netherlands); Commander of the Order of Dannebrog (Denmark)

Air Vice Marshal Robert Norman Bateson CB, DSO & Bar, DFC (10 June 1912 – 6 March 1986) was a Royal Air Force (RAF) pilot during the Second World War who flew extreme low-level raids against precision targets in occupied Europe. He started life in the English town of Watford, where he attended the local grammar school from 1914 onwards. Post-war he became a senior RAF officer.

== Military career ==
=== Second World War ===
Bateson joined the Royal Air Force in July 1936. After initial flying training, Bateson was granted a short service commission as an acting pilot officer in September 1936. He completed his RAF flying training in May 1937 and in June joined No. 113 Squadron RAF at RAF Upper Heyford where he initially flew the Hawker Hind. His squadron moved to RAF Grantham a few months later.

The squadron was one of several RAF units sent to Egypt and the Middle East in mid-1938. Based at RAF Heliopolis, the squadron was among the last in the Middle East to convert to the Bristol Blenheim bomber, in June 1939. Bateson later took command of the squadron, from September 1940 to January 1941, in operations against Italian forces in Libya.

In January 1942, Bateson took command of No. 211 Squadron RAF in Egypt. The squadron was one of several sent to the Far East after Japan entered World War 2. Flying from airfields in Sumatra and Java, the squadron suffered heavy losses to Japanese forces. Bateson, with other officers and men of 211 Squadron, was among RAF survivors evacuated to Australia in early March 1942. From May 1942, he was posted to command No. 11 Squadron RAF in Ceylon.

Bateson returned to the United Kingdom in mid-1943 and from February 1944 took over the command of No. 613 (City of Manchester) Squadron RAF. Equipped with De Havilland Mosquito FB.VI fighter bomber aircraft, the squadron was one of several in No. 2 Group RAF responsible for low level precision attacks, among them strikes against Gestapo Headquarters in, for example, The Hague (the Central Records Registry attack of 11 April 1944) and Copenhagen (the Operation Carthage attack on 'Shell House' of 21 March 1945).

=== Post-war ===
Bateson continued to serve in the RAF after the war, rising to the rank of air vice marshal in January 1960. From February 1963 he was Senior Air Staff Officer, HQ Fighter Command, the posting from which he retired on 1 August 1967.

== Honours and awards ==
- Citation for the award of the Distinguished Flying Cross to Acting Squadron Leader Robert Norman Bateson (39054), No. 113 Squadron.

Squadron Leader Bateson has displayed great devotion to duty when leading his squadron during extensive operations during September and October, 1940. His leadership has in fact played a considerable part in forcing the enemy to abandon several of his military base ports. He has led operational formations on thirty-six occasions and often, after objectives have been attacked, he has had to force his way through superior numbers of enemy fighters. Squadron Leader Bateson has also carried out a long series of hazardous reconnaissance’s and has obtained vital information. Throughout the period of active operations he has displayed rare courage and devotion to duty

- Citation for the award of the Distinguished Service Order to Acting Wing Commander Robert Norman Bateson, DFC (39054), No.613 Squadron.

This officer has displayed the highest standard of skill and leadership throughout the many and varied sorties in which he has participated. In April, 1944, Wing Commander Bateson flew the leading aircraft of a formation detailed to attack a target in the Netherlands. The operation, which demanded a high degree of courage and determination, was completed, with success and reflects the greatest credit on the efforts of this officer, whose leadership was outstanding. His achievements have been worthy of great praise.

- Citation for the award of a Bar to the Distinguished Service Order to Acting Group Captain Robert Norman Bateson, DSO, DFC.

Since being awarded the Distinguished Service Order this officer has completed very many sorties 'and the successes obtained are a splendid tribute to his exceptional skill great courage and unfailing devotion to duty. In March, 1945, Group Captain Bateson led a large formation of aircraft in an attack on the headquarters of the German Gestapo in Copenhagen. The operation called for the highest standard of skill as the target was small and well defended. Nevertheless, the attack was pressed home with a determination and accuracy which ensured success. In April,1945, this officer led his squadrons in an attack against a similar target at Odense. In spite of opposition from the ground defences the attack was vigorously and accurately pressed home. By his brilliant leadership. Group Captain Bateson played an important part in the success of these notable sorties.

- Award of Companion of the Most Honourable Order of the Bath (CB) to Air Vice-Marshal Robert Norman Bateson, DSO, DFC in the 1964 New Year Honours.
- Award of Airman's Cross to Wing commander Robert Norman Bateson (39054), No.613 Squadron.
