= London Security =

London Security is a British fire protection company based in Elland, West Yorkshire, England.

London Security has 200,000 customers in the UK, Belgium, the Netherlands, Austria and Luxembourg.

It is 98% owned by its chairman, Tony Murray.
