= Hawker Hector =

British army biplane

Hector
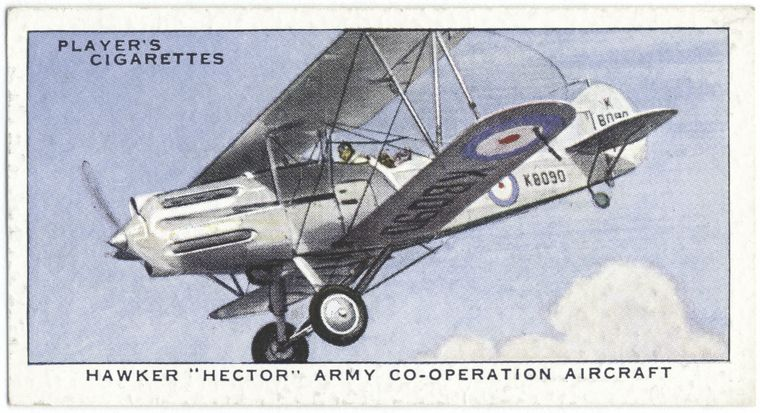

General information
- Type: Army co-operation
- Manufacturer: Hawker Aircraft
- Status: retired
- Primary users: Royal Air Force Irish Air Corps
- Number built: 179 (including 1 prototype)

History
- First flight: 14 February 1936
- Developed from: Hawker Hart

The Hawker Hector is a British biplane army co-operation and liaison aircraft of the late 1930s; it served with the Royal Air Force and saw brief combat in the Battle of France in May 1940. Some Hectors were later sold to Ireland. It was named after the Trojan prince Hector.

== Design and development ==
The Hector was intended as a replacement for the Hawker Audax army co-operation aircraft. The design and the building of the prototype was done by Hawker but production aircraft were built by Westland Aircraft in Yeovil, Somerset. Because of the demand for Rolls-Royce Kestrel engines required for the Hawker Hind programme, an alternative power plant was specified. Consequently, the 24 cylinder 805 hp (600 kW) Napier Dagger III was used. The prototype first flew on 14 February 1936 with George Bulman as pilot. One prototype and 178 production aircraft were built.

== Operational service ==
Starting in February 1937, the Hector began equipping the seven RAF army co-operation squadrons that would use it, but it in turn began to be replaced by Westland Lysanders beginning in July 1938. The Hectors were transferred to Auxiliary Air Force squadrons. In April 1940 No. 613 Squadron RAuxAF was converting to Lysanders at RAF Hawkinge and flew in support of the Allied garrison in the Siege of Calais. On 26 May, along with its Lysanders, six Hectors dive bombed German positions around Calais and on the following day, tried to drop supplies to the troops, unaware that they had already surrendered; two Hectors were lost. Hectors were used by the RAF from 1940 as target-tugs, and for towing General Aircraft Hotspur training gliders.

The Irish Air Corps received 13 examples after the Dunkirk Evacuation in 1941–42 and in general were in poor condition. They were sold by the British War Office to Ireland upon requests for aircraft as the Irish military found themselves wholly unprepared for modern warfare but still relied almost completely on Britain for military supplies. The defence of Ireland was in the British interest but while they were fighting the Battle of Britain, they could not afford to sell the Irish Government anything better than the Hector. The type was deeply unpopular with ground crews due to the complicated and unreliable Dagger engine, whose tightly packed high revving 24 cylinders made access difficult.

== Variants ==
- Hector Mk I : Two-seat army co-operation aircraft for the RAF.

== Operators ==
Ireland

- Irish Air Corps

United Kingdom

- Royal Air Force
  - No. 2 Squadron RAF
  - No. 4 Squadron RAF
  - No. 13 Squadron RAF
  - No. 26 Squadron RAF
  - No. 53 Squadron RAF
  - No. 59 Squadron RAF
  - No. 296 Squadron RAF
  - No. 602 Squadron RAF
  - No. 612 Squadron RAF
  - No. 613 Squadron RAF
  - No. 614 Squadron RAF
  - No. 615 Squadron RAF

== Surviving aircraft ==
In 1996, an ex-Irish Air Corps Hector 88 (ex RAF K8130) was recovered for eventual restoration from near Dundrum in Ireland.

Parts of Hector K8096 remain on Red Pike in the English Lake District. The aircraft crashed on 8 September 1941, killing its pilot.

== Specifications (Hector) ==
Data from Hawker Aircraft since 1920

General characteristics

- Crew: Two
- Length: 29 ft 9 3/4 in (9.09 m)
- Upper wingspan: 36 ft 11 1/2 in (11.26 m)
- Lower wingspan: 31 ft 4 in (9.55 m)
- Height: 10 ft 5 in (3.18 m)
- Wing area: 346 sq ft (32.1 m^{2})
- Empty weight: 3,389 lb (1,537 kg)
- Gross weight: 4,910 lb (2,227 kg)
- Powerplant: 1 × Napier Dagger III 24-cylinder air-cooled H-block engine, 805 hp (600 kW)
- Propellers: 2-bladed fixed pitch wooden propeller

Performance

- Maximum speed: 187 mph (301 km/h, 162 kn) at 6,600 ft (2,000 m)
- Stall speed: 50 mph (80 km/h, 44 kn)
- Range: 300 mi (480 km, 261 nmi)
- Service ceiling: 24,000 ft (7,300 m)
- Time to altitude: 5 minutes 40 seconds to 10,000 ft (3,000 m)

Armament

- Guns: ** 1 × forward-firing .303 in (7.7 mm) Vickers machine gun Mk.V
  - 1 × .303 in (7.7 mm) Lewis gun in the rear cockpit on a Hawker mount
- Bombs: Mountings for a camera, flares, and 2 × 112 lb (51 kg) bombs (or containers)

== See also ==
Related development

- Hawker Hart
- Hawker Audax

Aircraft of comparable role, configuration, and era

- Douglas O-46
- Henschel Hs 126
- Nakajima Ki-4
- RWD-14 Czapla

Related lists

- List of aircraft of the Royal Air Force
