= No. 211 Squadron RAF =

Defunct flying squadron of the Royal Air Force

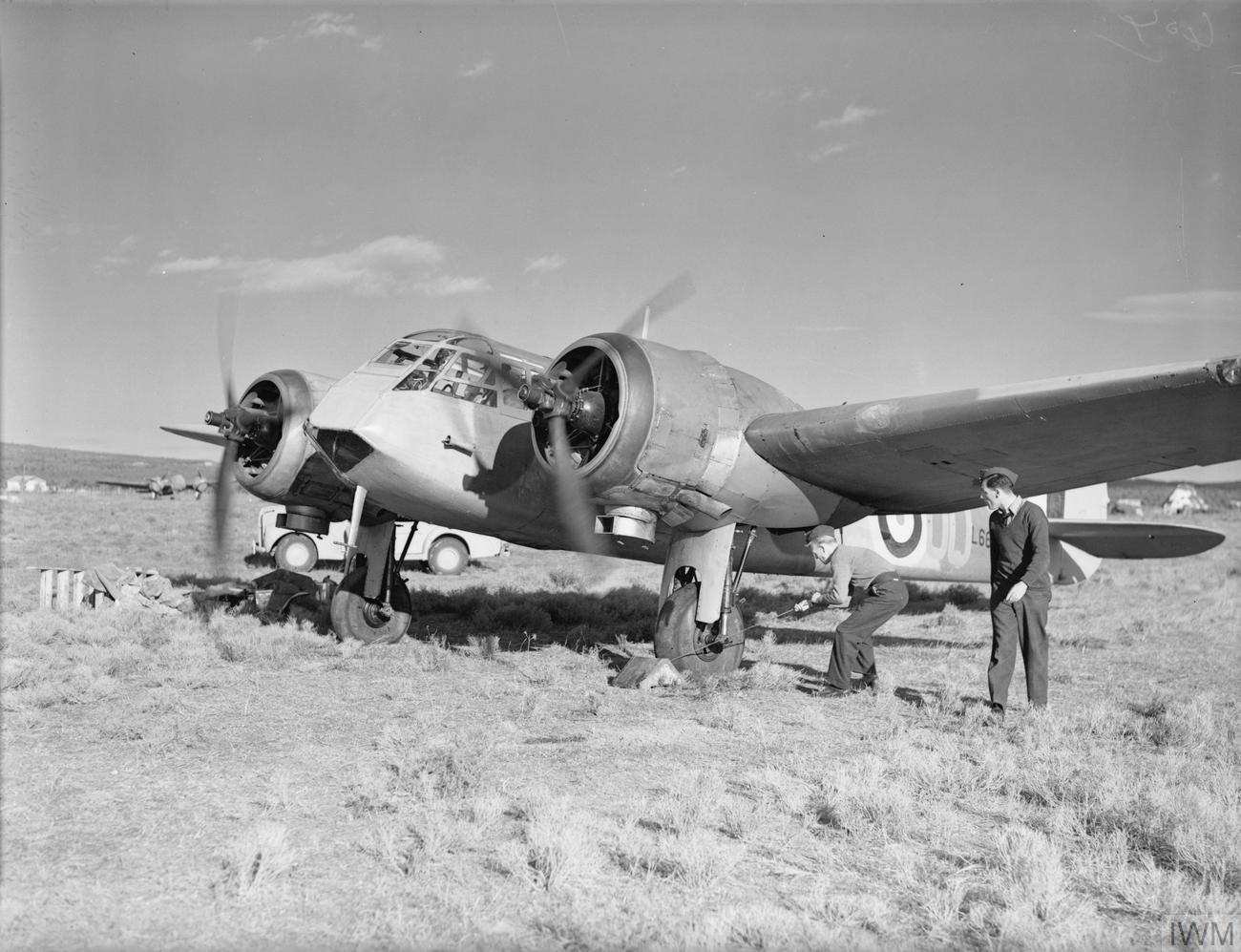
- Bristol Blenheim, 211 Squadron, Menidi, Greece, 1941
- Active: 1917 (RNAS), 1918–1919 (RAF); 1937–1946
- Country: United Kingdom
- Branch: Royal Air Force
- Role: Light bomber / fighter-bomber
- Mottos: Toujours à propos ("Always at the right moment")
- Engagements: World War I • Western Front; World War II • North African Campaign • Greco-Italian War • Battle of Greece • Syria–Lebanon Campaign • Dutch East Indies campaign • Burma Campaign

Insignia
- Squadron badge: An azure lion disjointed, ducally crowned.
- Squadron code: AO (1938); LJ (April–September 1939); UQ (September 1939 onwards)

No. 211 Squadron RAF was a squadron in the Royal Air Force active from 1917 to 1919 and from 1937 to 1946. In World War I it operated as a bomber and later a reconnaissance unit on the Western Front. In World War II it operated as a medium bomber unit in the Middle East and Far East and later as a strike fighter unit in the Far East, equipped with, successively, the Bristol Blenheim, the Bristol Beaufighter and de Havilland Mosquito.

== Squadron history ==
=== World War I ===
No. 11 (Naval) Squadron was formed in March 1917 as a squadron of the Royal Naval Air Service. It was primarily an operational training squadron, flying single-seat fighter aircraft, mainly Sopwith Pups and Triplanes, and a few Camels. It also flew standing patrols over the British naval ships stationed in the North Sea off the coast of the Netherlands. It was disbanded in August 1917.

On 10 March 1918 it was reformed as an RNAS bomber squadron at Petite-Synthe, Dunkirk, operating the DH.4 and DH.9 day bomber. Its operations were mainly directed against the ports of Bruges, Zeebrugge and Ostende, in an attempt to interdict the German U-boat campaign. On 1 April 1918, with the merging of the RNAS and the Army's Royal Flying Corps, it was renamed No. 211 Squadron RAF. It later flew operations in support of the Belgian Army in Flanders. From October 1918 it operated as a photographic reconnaissance unit.

The squadron was disbanded at RAF Wyton on 24 June 1919. During its period of service it lost 22 aircrew killed in action, 10 taken prisoner and 15 interned in the Netherlands. A further 18 men were wounded, while two men died during the post-war flu pandemic. They had accounted for 35 enemy aircraft, dropped 150 tons of bombs, and flown 205 reconnaissance sorties.

Squadron members were awarded three Distinguished Service Orders and one Bar, seven Distinguished Flying Crosses, one Distinguished Flying Medal, three mentions in despatches, two Silver Medals for Gallantry in Saving Life at Sea, and two Distinguished Service Crosses from the United States.

=== World War II ===
The squadron was re-formed at RAF Mildenhall on 24 June 1937, with 10 officers and about 50 airmen, and was initially equipped with 12 Hawker Audax light bombers organised into two flights of six. By the end of the year, there were 15 officer pilots and three sergeant pilots.

In August 1937 the squadron was re-equipped with the Hawker Hind, and moved to RAF Grantham the following month. In May 1938 the squadron was one of several deployed to RAF Middle East. Based at RAF Helwan in Egypt with 18 Hind aircraft, the squadron was organised into three flights of six, with 14 officers and about 180 other ranks. This included 18 pilots, split equally between officers and NCOs. In January 1939 it moved to RAF Ismailia where in April it re-equipped with the Bristol Blenheim Mk.I twin-engined light bomber. With nine or twelve Blenheims, the squadron establishment was set at 360 officers and men. From June 1940, following the Italian declaration of war, 211 Squadron was involved in operations against the Italians in Libya and the Western Desert, including the attack on Tobruk on 12 June, during which the cruiser San Giorgio was damaged, and a few days later in the capture of Fort Capuzzo.

Following the attack by Italy, in November 1940 it moved to Greece, initially based at Tatoi, the pre-war civil airport and Hellenic Air Force base at Menidi on the northern outskirts of Athens, before moving forward to Paramythia near the north-western border with Albania. On 13 April 1941, the squadron suffered a severe blow when, following an attack on German forces at Florina in the Monastir Gap by six aircraft, they were attacked by Bf 109Es of JG 27 on the return flight, and all six aircraft were shot down. The German advance forced 211 Squadron back, first to Agrinion and then to Tatoi from where it was evacuated in April 1941 through Crete to Egypt.

The squadron then moved to Palestine. Based at RAF Aqir by May 1941 and partly re-equipped with the Blenheim Mk. IV, the squadron flew operations against Vichy French forces in the Syria–Lebanon Campaign. Withdrawn to Egypt in June 1941, it was based at RAF Heliopolis to regroup for the pending move to Wadi Gazouza in Sudan. There it was to act as a reserve training Squadron from July to October 1941, before providing the nucleus for the formation of No. 72 OTU, into which the squadron and personnel were formally absorbed in November 1941.

The squadron was re-established in December 1941 at RAF Helwan, equipped with 24 Blenheim IVs with around 90 aircrew and over 400 ground staff. In January 1942, it was sent to the Far East to operate from Sumatra and Java in a short-lived campaign against the Japanese. The squadron suffered heavy casualties, losing ten aircraft and 19 aircrew killed or missing during operations from 6 February to 21 February 1942. By the first week of March, Allied forces were withdrawing from Java but only 87 of 211 Squadron's personnel were evacuated before the surrender on 8 March 1942. At least 340 personnel of the squadron were taken prisoner by the Japanese, of whom 179 died in captivity.

The squadron re-formed at Phaphamau in India on 14 August 1943 and in October was equipped with the Bristol Beaufighter Mk. X. Operating 16 or 18 aircraft the squadron comprised 40 to 50 aircrew with around 350 groundcrew. After moving to Ranchi in November, then to Silchar in December, in January 1944 it moved to Bhatpara, from where it was engaged in operations against the Japanese in Burma. By July 1944 it was based at Chiringa in Bengal Province, India (now Bangladesh) where it was to operate until stood down for conversion to the de Havilland Mosquito from June 1945. From March 1945, the squadron's maintenance personnel were re-established as No. 7211 Servicing Echelon, undertaking all the squadron's aircraft maintenance work thereafter.

In May 1945 the squadron was stood down from operations and moved to Yelahanka, near Bangalore, where in June it was re-equipped with de Havilland Mosquito FB Mk. VI. In July it moved to St. Thomas Mount, Madras, and in November, following the Japanese surrender, to Akyab, Burma, then to Don Muang, Bangkok, Thailand. There, on 15 March 1946, it was finally disbanded.

Between 1937 and 1946 the members of 211 Squadron were awarded three Distinguished Service Orders, 27 Distinguished Flying Crosses and one Bar, eight Distinguished Flying Medals, five mentions in dispatches, and four awards from other countries.

== Aircraft operated ==
Aircraft operated have included:

- Sopwith Pup
- Sopwith Triplane
- Sopwith Camel
- Airco DH.4
- Airco DH.9
- Hawker Audax
- Hawker Hind
- Bristol Blenheim
- Bristol Beaufighter
- de Havilland Mosquito

== Commanding officers ==
1918–1919
Name	Dates	Notes
Major H.G. Travers	March–May 1918	
Major R. Loraine	May–July 1918	
Major G.R.M. Reid	July 1918 – March 1919	Retired as Air Vice-Marshal, 1946
Captain H.N. Lett	March–June 1919	
1937–1946
Name	Dates	Notes
Squadron Leader R.J.A. Ford	July 1937 – March 1938	Retired as Group Captain, 1954
Squadron Leader S.H. Ware	March 1938 – February 1939	Retired as Air Commodore, 1948
Squadron Leader J.W.B. Judge	February 1939 – July 1940	Retired as Group Captain, 1952
Squadron Leader A.R.G. Bax	July–September 1940	Retired as Wing Commander, 1955
Squadron Leader J.R. Gordon–Finlayson	September 1940 – March 1941	Retired as Air Vice-Marshal, 1967
Squadron Leader R.J.C. Nedwill	March 1941	Killed in air accident, 26 March 1941
Squadron Leader A.T. Irvine	March–April 1941	KIA, 13 April 1941
Squadron Leader K.C.V.D. Dundas	April–May 1941	KIA, 10 February 1942
Squadron Leader A.S.B. Blomfield	May–July 1941	KIA, 7 October 1943
Wing Commander D.C.R. Macdonald	July–November 1941	
Wing Commander R.N. Bateson	January–March 1942	Retired as Air Vice-Marshal, 1967
Acting Squadron Leader J.E.S. Hill	October 1943	
Wing Commander P.E. Meagher	October 1943 – August 1944	
Squadron Leader J.S.R. Muller–Rowland	August–October 1944	Killed in DH 108 accident, 15 February 1950
Squadron Leader H.E. Martineau	October–December 1944	
Squadron Leader R.N. Dagnall	December 1944 – January 1945	KIA, 13 January 1945
Wing Commander R.C.O. Lovelock	January–August 1945	
Wing Commander D.L. Harvey	August 1945 – March 1946	Retired as Wing Commander, 1966
