= No. 613 Squadron RAuxAF =

No. 613 (City of Manchester) Squadron RAuxAF
- Active: 1 February 1939 – 7 August 1945; 10 May 1946 – 10 March 1957
- Country: United Kingdom
- Branch: Royal Auxiliary Air Force
- Part of: RAF Army Cooperation Command (39–43); RAF Bomber Command (43–45); RAF Reserve Command (46–50); RAF Fighter Command (50–57)
- Nickname(s): City of Manchester
- Motto(s): Latin: Semper parati (Translation: "Always ready")
- post 1953 squadron markings

Commanders
- Honorary Air Commodore: Sir Roy Dobson
- Notable commanders: Percy "Laddy" Lucas

Insignia
- Squadron Badge heraldry: In front of two wings conjoined at base, a black fleur de lis The badge is based upon the badge of the Manchester Regiment
- Squadron Codes: ZR (Oct 1939 – Apr 1942); SY (Apr 1942 – Aug 1945); RAT (May 1946 – Mar 1950); Q3 (Mar 1950 – Dec 1953)

No. 613 (City of Manchester) Squadron was an Auxiliary Air Force later Royal Auxiliary Air Force squadron formed on 1 February 1939 at the then new municipal airport at Ringway, nine miles south of Manchester. The squadron served at first in the army cooperation role, and later during the Second World War became a tactical bomber unit. After the war the squadron reformed as a fighter unit and as such flew until its last disbandment in March 1957.

== History ==
=== Formation and early years ===
The squadron was formed at RAF Ringway on 1 February 1939 in the army cooperation role as part of No. 22 (Army Co-Operation) Group. It was initially intended that the title 'East Lancashire' Squadron would be used, but this could have been confused with No. 611 Squadron RAF, named 'West Lancashire', based at Liverpool's airport at Speke. The link with the City of Manchester was therefore created. The squadron was initially equipped with Hawker Hinds. On 2 October 1939, the squadron moved from RAF Ringway to RAF Odiham near Basingstoke and Hawker Hectors were delivered to the unit during November to replace the Hinds. From 2 April 1940, Westland Lysanders served alongside the Hectors. The Hectors and Lysanders were used to dive-bomb German positions and drop supplies to friendly troops near Calais during the late May 1940 Dunkirk evacuation.

=== Tactical reconnaissance operations ===
In August 1941 the squadron became a tactical reconnaissance unit and it began re-equipping with the faster Curtiss Tomahawk. It re-equipped with the early Allison V-1710 powered Mark I version of the North American Mustang in April 1942, continuing to operate within RAF Army Cooperation Command. During Spring and Summer 1943 the Mustangs were flown on "Lagoon" low level shipping reconnaissance flights over the North Sea to near the Dutch Coast, calling in heavy Coastal Command strike aircraft when enemy shipping was located.

=== Mosquito operations ===
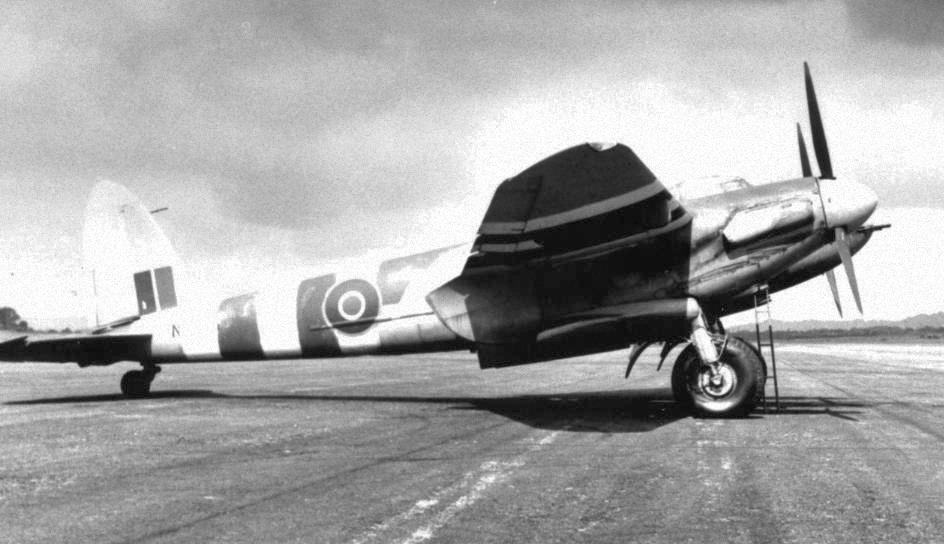
613 Squadron Mosquito FB.VI NS898 'SY-Z' at RAF Lasham wearing 'D-Day' stripes in June 1944

On 15 October 1943 the squadron moved to RAF Lasham, Hampshire and began to equip with the de Havilland Mosquito when it joined No. 2 Group as a day and night tactical strike unit. The squadron mainly flew night intrusion sorties, but also took part in daylight precision actions such as that against the Dutch Central Population Registry building on 11 April 1944, where the Germans held their Dutch Gestapo records. The squadron disbanded at Cambrai-Epinoy, France, on 7 August 1945 by being renumbered to No. 69 Squadron.

=== Postwar operations ===
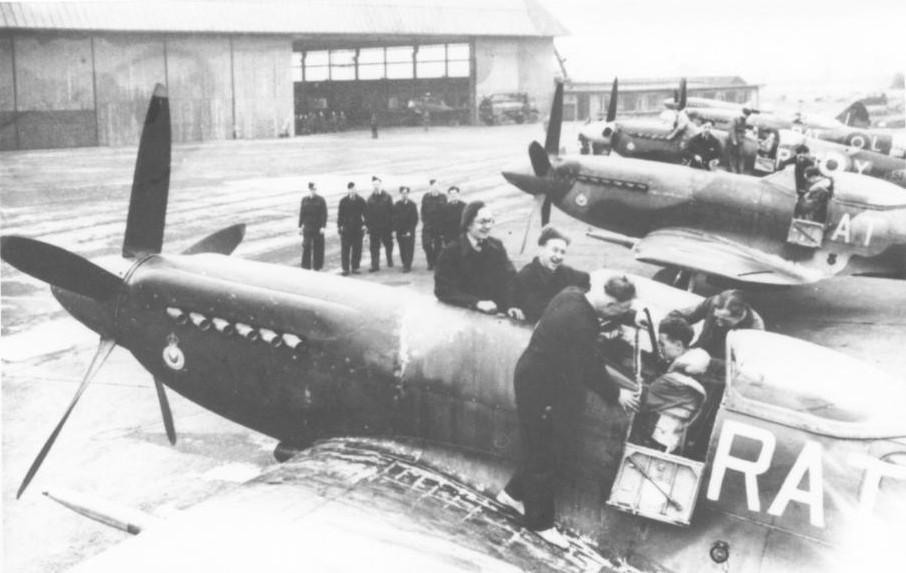
No. 613 Squadron Spitfire F.14s outside their Hangar No. 7 at RAF Ringway in 1947. Note the squadron's 'RAT' Reserve Command codes

The squadron reformed on 10 May 1946 at RAF Ringway (now Manchester Airport), as a fighter squadron within Reserve Command. The unit's home was in Ringway's Hangar No.7, which had been completed for the squadron in spring 1940, a few months after leaving the airport for wartime service elsewhere. No. 613 Squadron was initially equipped with Supermarine Spitfire FR.14s, replacing these in November 1948 by the higher performance Mark F.22s. North American Harvard aircraft were used in the dual training role. The Spitfires and their volunteer flying and ground crews were frequently detached to RAF Horsham St Faith, Norfolk, and other RAF stations, for weekend exercises alongside regular RAF squadrons.

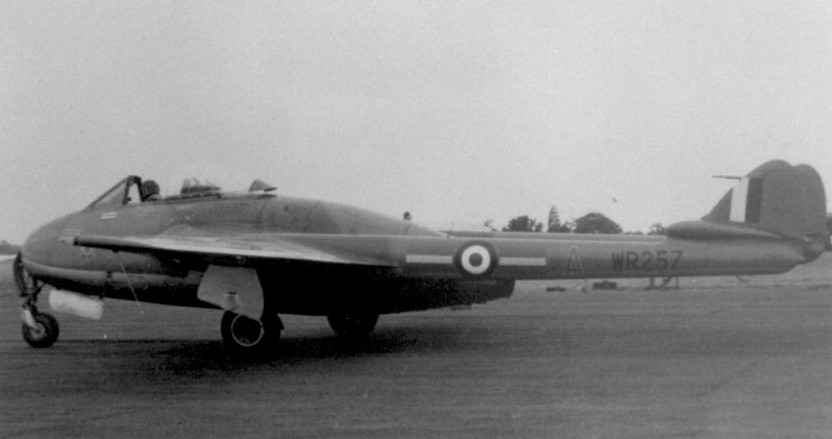
No.613 Squadron Vampire FB.9 WR257 'A', built by Fairey Aviation at Ringway, was flown by the unit's C/O S.Ldr Jack Wales between June 1954 and December 1956

In April 1950, No. 613 Squadron was transferred to become a unit within RAF Fighter Command. No. 613 re-equipped during February 1951 with the jet-powered De Havilland Vampire FB.5. The Harvard T.2s were replaced by Gloster Meteor T.7 twin-seat trainers. Initial training with the new jet aircraft was carried out at Avros nearby Woodford Aerodrome, with its longer runway, by courtesy of the squadron's honorary air commodore, Sir Roy Dobson, 613's commanding officer, Squadron Leader Jack Wales DFC, a test pilot for Avros, flew the unit's only Vampire FB.9, WR257 'A' between June 1954 and his death in December 1956 when flight testing the prototype Avro Shackleton MR.3. WR257 had been built by Fairey Aviation at Ringway – the only example of a jet aircraft being both built and based at the airfield.

After six further years of peacetime exercises, often detaching to operational RAF fighter stations, the unit disbanded for the final time at Ringway on 10 March 1957, on the same day as all other Royal Auxiliary Air Force flying units.

== Aircraft operated ==
Aircraft operated by no. 613 Squadron RAF, data from
From	To	Aircraft	Version
May 1939	December 1939	Hawker Hind	
November 1939	June 1940	Hawker Hector	Mk.I
April 1940	April 1942	Westland Lysander	Mks.I, II
January 1941	June 1942	Westland Lysander	Mk.IIIa
August 1941	April 1942	Curtiss Tomahawk	Mk.IIa
April 1942	October 1943	North American Mustang	Mk.I
November 1943	August 1945	de Havilland Mosquito	FB.Mk.VI
December 1946	December 1948	Supermarine Spitfire	FR.14
November 1948	March 1951	Supermarine Spitfire	F.22
November 1948	April 1950	North American Harvard	Mk.IIb
September 1949	April 1950	de Havilland Vampire	F.1
April 1950	March 1957	Gloster Meteor	T.7
February 1951	March 1957	de Havilland Vampire	FB.5
June 1954	March 1957	de Havilland Vampire	FB.9

== Commanding officers ==
Officers commanding no. 613 Squadron RAF, data from
From	To	Name
March 1939	January 1940	S/Ldr. E. Rhodes
January 1940	July 1940	S/Ldr. A.F. Anderson
July 1940	September 1940	W/Cdr. J.N.T. Stephenson
September 1940	February 1941	W/Cdr D.C.R.Macdonald
June 1941	September 1942	W/Cdr. Viscount Acheson
September 1942	December 1942	S/Ldr. C.L. Page
December 1942	October 1943	W/Cdr. C.B.E. Burt-Andrews
October 1943	February 1944	W/Cdr. K.H. Blair, DFC & Bar
February 1944	June 1944	W/Cdr. R.N. Bateson, DFC
June 1944	December 1944	W/Cdr. C. Newman
December 1944	August 1945	W/Cdr. P.B. Lucas, DSO, DFC
November 1946	March 1951	S/Ldr. J.S. Morton, DFC & Bar
March 1951	December 1956	S/Ldr. J.B. Wales
December 1956	March 1957	None

== See also ==
- RAF Ringway
- Tony Murray (businessman)
