= Andrews Sykes Group =

Andrews Sykes Group plc
- Company type: Public limited company
- Industry: Climate control
- Founded: 1857
- Headquarters: Wolverhampton, England, United Kingdom
- Key people: Carl Webb, Managing Director; Jacques Murray, Chairman
- Number of employees: 600 approx.
- Website: www.andrews-sykes.com

Andrews Sykes Group is a specialist hire company in the United Kingdom, and a supplier of pumping, heating and cooling solutions. Its headquarters are in Wolverhampton, United Kingdom.

In 1989, Sykes Pumps was merged with Andrews Industrial Equipment by Braithwaite Group to form what is known today as Andrews Sykes Hire Ltd. The company has 30 depots based in the UK, with more than 300 UK-based staff. There are also a number of operations internationally with bases across Europe, the Middle East and North America.

It is listed on the London Stock Exchange.

It is majority-owned by its chairman, Tony Murray.

== History ==
Originally set-up in 1857, the company was established as a pumps specialist working on numerous schemes along the River Thames. In the late 1920s, founder Henry Sykes bought land on the Greenwich marshes to supplement premises in Bankside which became the business headquarters. 1964 saw the introduction of Andrews Industrial Equipment, which was at this time a separate entity from the Sykes brand. Andrews was predominantly involved with heating equipment and steam cleaners initially but by 1970, had branched out into air conditioning units.

During this period, the company quickly broadened its geographical presence by opening depots in London, Glasgow and Nottingham – in addition to its original base in Wolverhampton.

Following Braithwaite Group’s acquisition of what was by then known as Sykes Pumps, a merger was completed in 1989 – forming what is known today as Andrews Sykes Hire Ltd. In the years since, the organisation has been heavily involved in a number of high-profile projects including the construction of the Millennium Dome in 1999.

In 2017, Sykes Pumps celebrated their 160th anniversary. The year has coincided with the company opening other depots in the UK and also marked the conclusion of one of their largest developments. In September 2017, the Queensferry Crossing in Scotland was officially opened to the public. Sykes Pumps oversaw the ballasting for this particular scheme which has been referred to in the media as ‘Scotland’s biggest infrastructural project for a generation’.

== Operations ==
Andrews Sykes Hire is now active across Europe, with depots in the Netherlands, France, Switzerland, Belgium, Italy, Dubai, Abu Dhabi and other Middle Eastern regions. The company currently offers heating and air conditioning equipment, boilers, chillers and other HVAC services. The equipment is regularly used across a full range of applications, ranging from construction sites and power stations to offshore oil facilities and manufacturing plants.
