= Tony Murray (businessman) =

French-born British businessman (1920–2023)

Jacques Gaston Murray
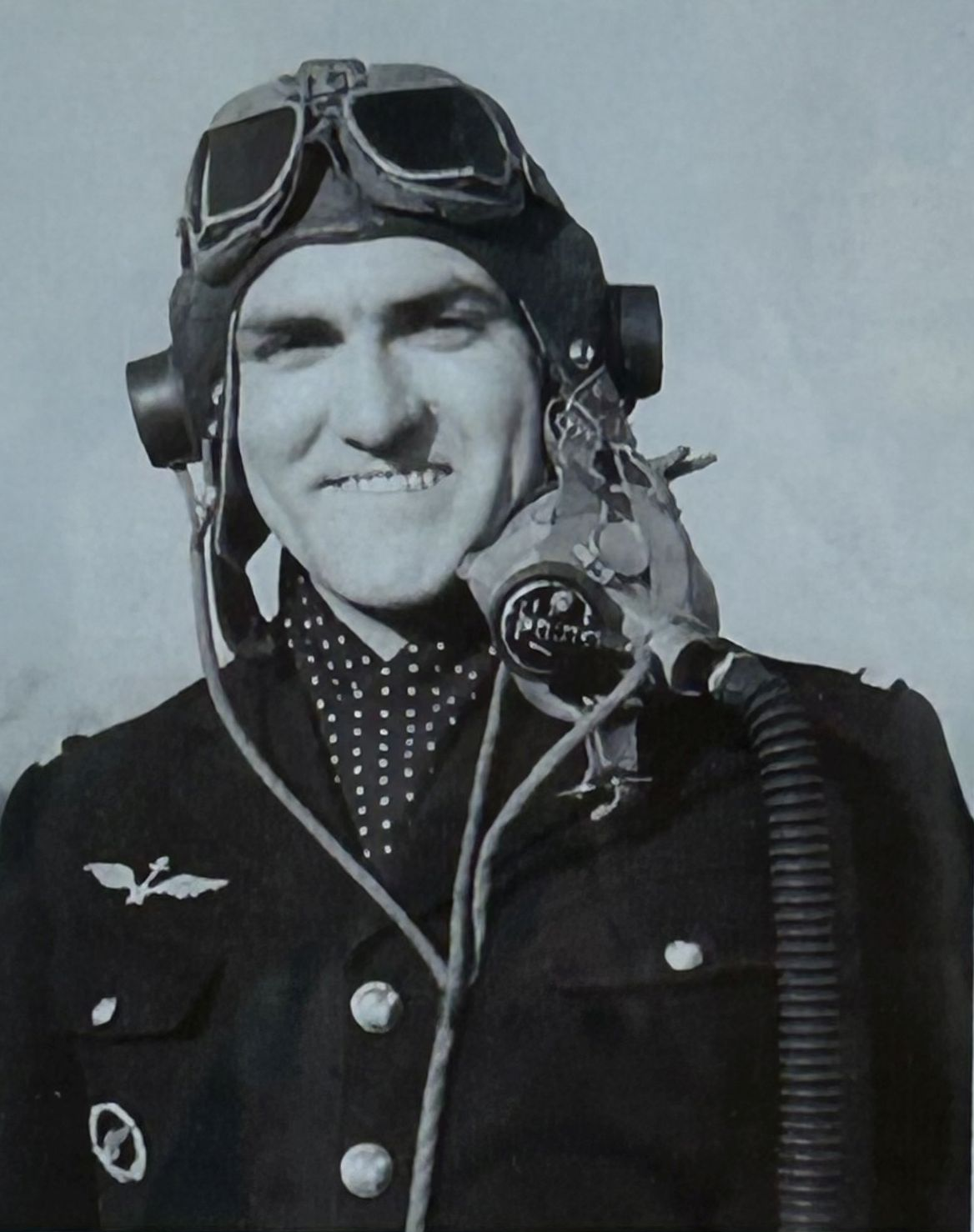
- Born: Gaston Jacques Kalifa; 8 February 1920; Paris, France
- Died: 6 June 2023 (aged 103)
- Occupation: Businessman
- Title: Chairman, London Security plc Chairman, Andrew Sykes Group plc
- Children: 2

Jacques Gaston Murray, known as Tony Murray (born Gaston Jacques Kalifa; 8 February 1920 – 6 June 2023) was a French-born British billionaire businessman.

Murray owned Andrew Sykes Group, the heating and air-conditioning equipment hire company, and London Security, the Leeds-based fire protection business which includes the Nu-Swift fire extinguisher brand.

According to The Sunday Times Rich List 2022, his net worth was estimated at £2.53 billion.

== Early life ==
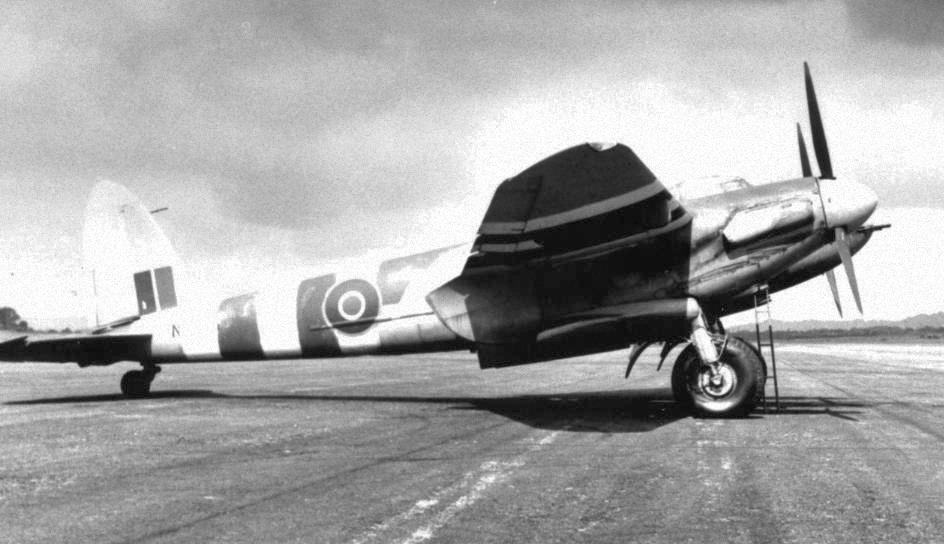
A De Havilland Mosquito of No. 613 Squadron RAF, pictured in June 1944

Murray was born in Paris, France on 8 February 1920 and was originally named Gaston Jacques Kalifa. His father ran a construction company that worked on infrastructure projects such as bridges. He was accepted to study architecture at the Ecole des Beaux-Arts in Paris before the outbreak of World War II. He escaped from Paris at the time of the German invasion of France and reached Biarritz where he boarded a Polish ship which took him to England. He enlisted in the Free French forces and eventually transferred to the Royal Air Force (RAF). He flew 38 missions as a navigator in No. 613 Squadron RAF. He received British citizenship after the war.

His father was murdered in Auschwitz. He was awarded the Legion of Honour by the French government.

== Career ==
In 1982, Murray bought Nu-Swift, a Leeds manufacturer of fire extinguishers then in difficulties, with the businessman Michael Ashcroft. Murray later "became irritated" by Ashcroft getting too much of the credit for turning round the company.

== Personal life and death ==
His sons, Jean-Jacques Murray and Jean‑Pierre Murray are both directors of London Security, the latter being non-executive.

Murray turned 100 in February 2020, and died on 6 June 2023, at the age of 103.
