= No. 113 Squadron RAF =

Defunct flying squadron of the Royal Air Force

- Active: 1 Aug 1917 – 1 Feb 1920; 18 May 1937 – 15 Oct 1945; 1 Sep 1946 – 1 Apr 1947; 1 May 1947 – 1 Sep 1948; 22 Jul 1959 – 10 Jul 1963
- Country: United Kingdom
- Branch: Royal Air Force
- Role: Army cooperation Bomber; Fighter; Transport; Missile operation
- Nickname: 'Crusader Squadron'
- Mottos: Latin: Velox et vindex ("Swift to vengeance")
- Engagements: Sinai and Palestine Campaign; World War II; Pacific War; Bombing of Bangkok

Insignia
- Squadron Badge heraldry: In front of a cross potent, between four like crosses, two swords in saltire, the points uppermost The crosses are from the arms of Jerusalem. The swords reflect the unit's service in defence of the Holy Land
- Squadron Codes: BT (Apr 1939 – Sep 1939); VA (Sep 1939 – Sep 1943); AD (Apr 1945 – Oct 1945)

No. 113 Squadron began service in 1917 with the Egyptian Expeditionary Force commanded by General Edmund Allenby. Initially, the squadron was a unit of the Royal Flying Corps, serving during the Sinai and Palestine Campaign and as a reconnaissance, army cooperation, bomber, fighter, transport and missile operation squadron during its existence.

== History ==
=== Formation in World War I as reconnaissance unit ===
No. 113 Squadron was formed on 1 August 1917 at what became RAF Ismailia, Egypt, as a corps reconnaissance and army co-operation unit, taking over duties of trench reconnaissance from No. 1 Squadron Australian Flying Corps, otherwise known as 67 (Australian) Squadron RFC. In September it began tactical reconnaissance and artillery spotting missions over Palestine, where it remained until the end of World War I. The squadron returned to Egypt on 16 February 1919 and a year later it was disbanded by being renumbered to No. 208 Squadron RAF on 1 February 1920.

=== 1937 – 1945 ===
No. 113 reformed at RAF Upper Heyford on 18 May 1937 as a day bomber unit, equipped with Hawker Hinds. In April 1938 it left for the Middle East, converting to the Bristol Bisley/Blenheim in June 1939. After Italy joined the war, on 11 June 1940 the unit participated in the first attack by the RAF on the Italian air force base at El Adem, where 18 aircraft were destroyed or damaged on the ground, against the loss of three British aircraft from three squadrons. On 12 June 1940 the squadron participated in an attack on Tobruk, damaging the San Giorgio. The squadron then moved to Greece in March 1941. There it was overtaken by the German invasion and lost all its aircraft, the squadron personnel being evacuated to Crete and Egypt. Bombing operations in North Africa resumed in June 1941.

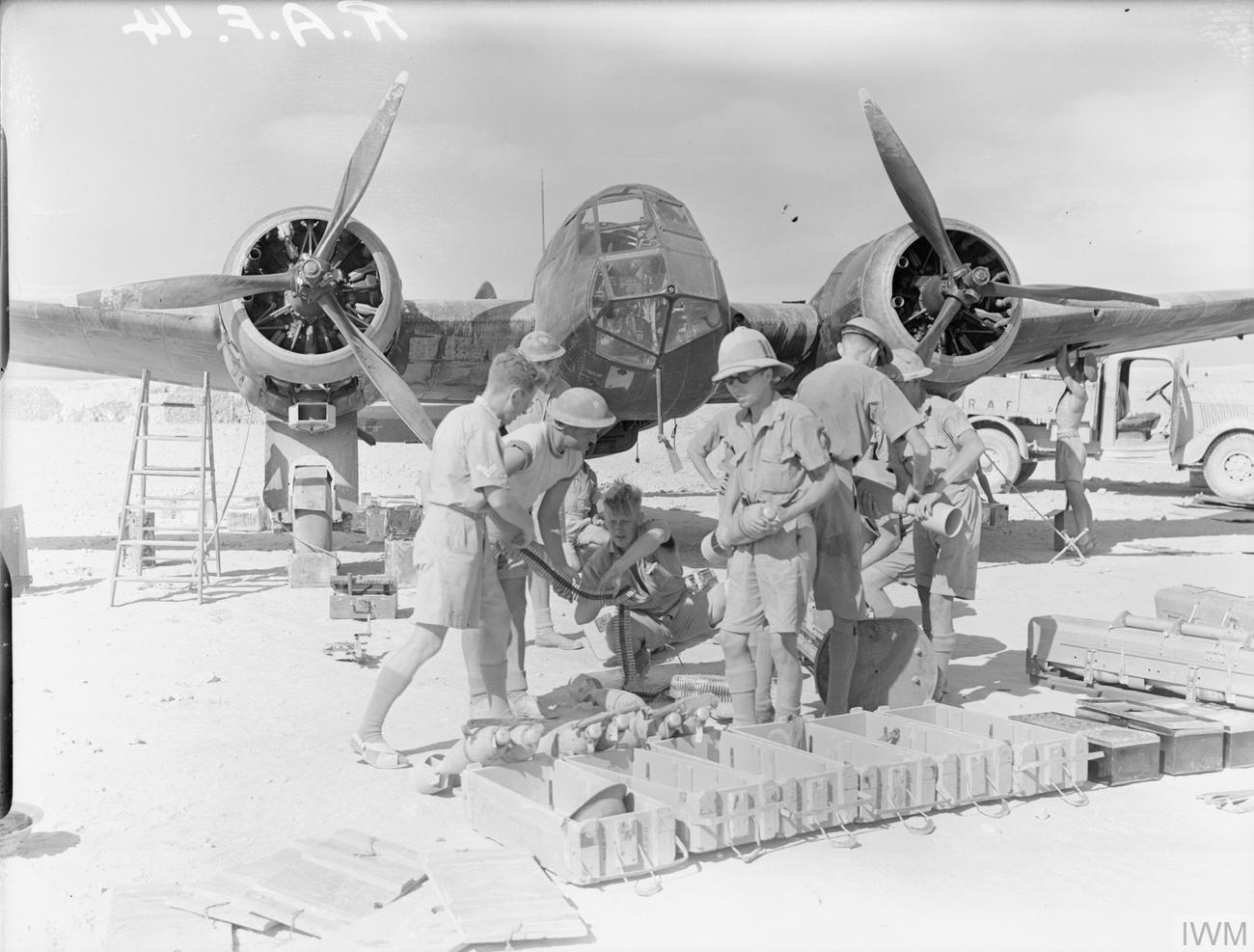
A Bristol Blenheim light bomber of No. 113 Squadron in Egypt, being prepared for an attack on Tobruk, 1941

No. 113 Squadron was selected for a special operation in November 1941, as Allied ground forces began Operation Crusader. From a temporary airfield behind enemy lines in Libya – LG-215 (at 30°18′5″N 22°54′0″E) which had been prepared by the Long Range Desert Group – the squadron was to attack Axis rear area supply lines. The Blenheims were escorted by Hurricanes from No. 33 Squadron RAF. Their aircraft were spotted by a German reconnaissance flight on 21 November, and the following day LG-215 was attacked by Ju 88s, resulting in damage to many of the Blenheims. The operation was considered to be a success, and No. 113 Squadron afterwards flew to Ma'aten Bagush, Egypt beyond the range of German bombers.

After the outbreak of war with Japan the squadron was redeployed to Burma. At this point it was made up predominantly of personnel from other Commonwealth countries, particularly personnel from the Royal Australian Air Force (RAAF), and was commanded by a Rhodesian, Wing Commander Reginald Stidolph, DFC. It arrived in Burma on 7 January 1942 and immediately participated in the first allied bombing attack on Bangkok. A second raid was undertaken on 24 January. The squadron suffered heavy casualties while attacking Japanese columns in Burma and the survivors withdrew to Calcutta in March. From Assam, No. 113 bombed Japanese communications and airfields. At least 16 RAAF personnel were killed in action with the squadron as a Blenheim unit in Burma and India.

In March 1943 the squadron was reformed as a ground-attack unit and converted to Hurricanes. These were replaced by Thunderbolts in April 1945. The squadron was disbanded following the war's end, on 15 October 1945.

=== Post war reformations as a transport squadron ===
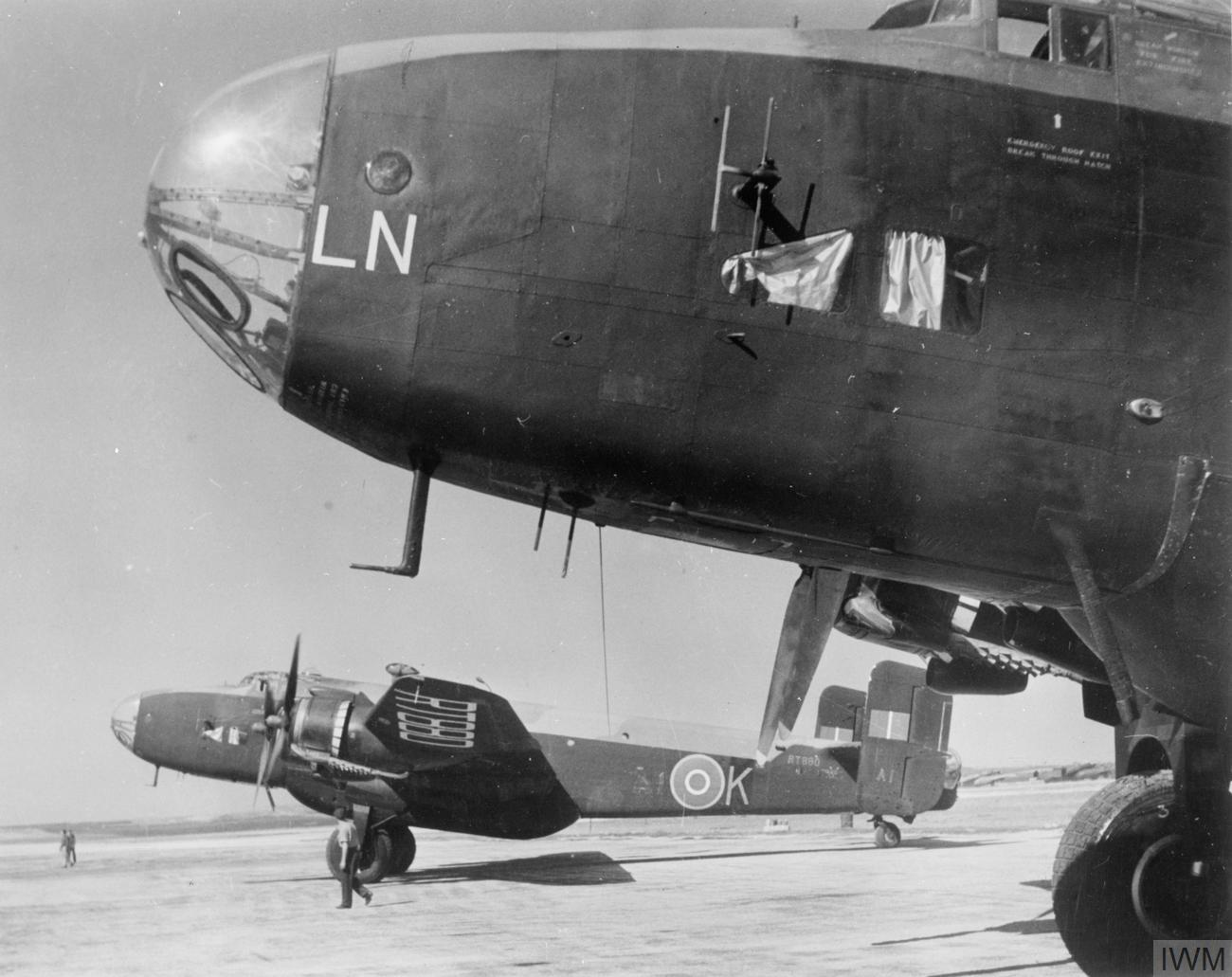
One of the squadron's Handley Page Halifax transport aircraft at Aqir airfield in Palestine

On 1 September 1946 No. 620 Squadron RAF at RAF Aqir was renumbered to No. 113 Squadron RAF and was engaged in transport duties with Halifax A.7s until disbanded on 1 April 1947. The squadron reformed on 1 May 1947 at RAF Fairford now flying Douglas Dakotas alongside Halifax A.9s, being disbanded on 1 September 1948.

=== On Thor missiles ===
The squadron was reformed – as 113 (SM) Squadron – on 22 July 1959 as one of 20 Strategic Missile (SM) squadrons associated with Project Emily. The squadron was equipped with three Thor Intermediate range ballistic missiles, based at RAF Mepal.

In October 1962, during the Cuban Missile Crisis, the squadron was kept at full readiness, with the missiles aimed at strategic targets in the Union of Soviet Socialist Republics. The squadron was disbanded on 10 July 1963, with the termination of the Thor Program in Britain.

== Commanding officers ==
1918–1919
Name	Dates	Notes
Major S.R. McCrindle	October 1918-February 1920	
1937–1946
Name	Dates	Notes
Squadron Leader G. Bartholomew	May 1937–December 1937	Later Air Commodore and British Air Attaché to Turkey. Died in flying accident, Ankara, August 1949.
Wing Commander F.G. Cator	January 1938-March 1939	Group Captain Cator CBE retired in 1951.
Squadron Leader G.B. Keily DFC AFC	March 1939–July 1940	PoW Libya September 1940. Retired as Air Commodore 1952.
Squadron Leader R.N. Bateson DFC	Sep 1940-January 1941	Retired as Air Vice-Marshal, CB DSO & Bar DFC, August 1967.
Squadron Leader R.H. Spencer	February 1941–August 1941	
Wing Commander R.N. Stidolph	March 1941-April 1942	
Wing Commander J.F. Grey	April 1942-July 1942	
Wing Commander E.L.A. Walter DFC AFC	July 1942-December 1942	
Wing Commander W.L. Jones DFC	December 1942–July 1943	
Major J.L.B. Viney SAAF	July–August 1943	
Squadron Leader I.L.B Aitkens	September 1943–December 1943	
Squadron Leader R.N.H. Courtney	January–September 1944	
Flight Lieutenant Ernest.M. Frost	September–November 1944	
Squadron Leader Jack Rose DFC	November 1944–May 1945	
Squadron Leader M. Paddle	May–October 1945	

== Aircraft operated ==
Aircraft operated by No. 113 Squadron RAF
From	To	Aircraft	Variant
Aug 1917	Apr 1918	Royal Aircraft Factory B.E.2	BE.2e
Sep 1917	Feb 1920	Royal Aircraft Factory RE.8	
Feb 1918	Oct 1918	Nieuport 17	17, 23 & 24
Feb 1919	Dec 1919	Royal Aircraft Factory B.E.2	BE.2e
May 1937	Jun 1939	Hawker Hind	
Jun 1939	Mar 1940	Bristol Blenheim	Mk.I
Jun 1941	Dec 1941	Bristol Blenheim	Mk.I
Mar 1940	Apr 1941	Bristol Blenheim	Mk.IV
Jun 1941	Oct 1942	Bristol Blenheim	Mk.IV
Oct 1942	Sep 1943	Bristol Blenheim	Mk.V
Sep 1943	Apr 1945	Hawker Hurricane	Mk.IIc
Apr 1945	Oct 1945	Republic Thunderbolt	Mks.I & II
Sep 1946	Dec 1946	Handley Page Halifax	A.7 & C.8
Sep 1946	Apr 1947	Handley Page Halifax	A.9
Sep 1946	Sep 1948	Douglas Dakota	C.4
Nov 1947	Sep 1948	Handley Page Halifax	A.9
22 July 1959	10 July 1963	Thor IRBM	SM.75

== See also ==
- List of UK Thor missile bases
- List of Royal Air Force aircraft squadrons
