= Hawker Hind =

1934 bomber airplane family by Hawker

Hind
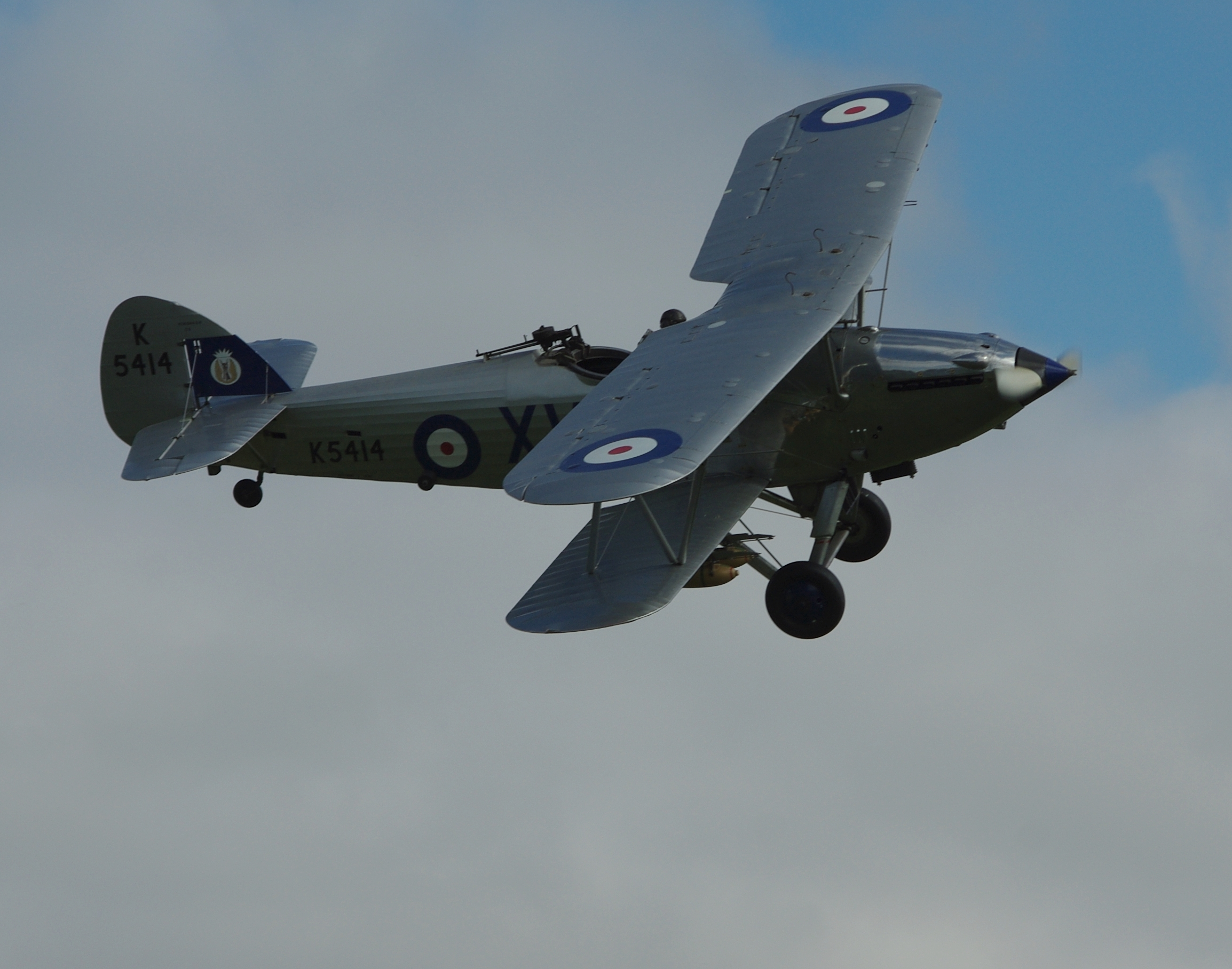
- Hawker Hind (Afghan), Shuttleworth Collection

General information
- Type: Light bomber, trainer
- National origin: United Kingdom
- Manufacturer: Hawker Aircraft Limited
- Designer: Sydney Camm
- Primary users: Royal Air Force Iran; New Zealand; South Africa
- Number built: 528

History
- Manufactured: 1935–1938
- Introduction date: 1935
- First flight: 12 September 1934
- Retired: 1955 (Afghanistan)
- Developed from: Hawker Hart
- Variants: Hawker Hector; Hawker P.V.4

The Hawker Hind is a British light bomber of the inter-war years produced by Hawker Aircraft for the Royal Air Force. It was developed from the Hawker Hart day bomber introduced in 1931.

== Design and development ==
An improved Hawker Hart bomber defined by Specification G.7/34, was purchased by the RAF as an interim aircraft, while more modern monoplane bombers such as the Fairey Battle were still in development. Structural elements were a mixture of steel and duralumin with the wings being fabric covered; the main differences compared to the earlier Hart was a new powerplant, (the Rolls-Royce Kestrel V) and the inclusion of refinements from the earlier derivatives such as the cut-down rear cockpit developed for the Demon. The prototype (Serial number K2915) was constructed very rapidly due to Hawker's development work for other proposals and made its first flight on 12 September 1934. A variety of changes were subsequently incorporated ("ram's horn" exhaust manifolds, Fairey-Reed metal propeller and engine improvements) with the first production Hind (K4636) flown on 4 September 1935.

== Operational history ==
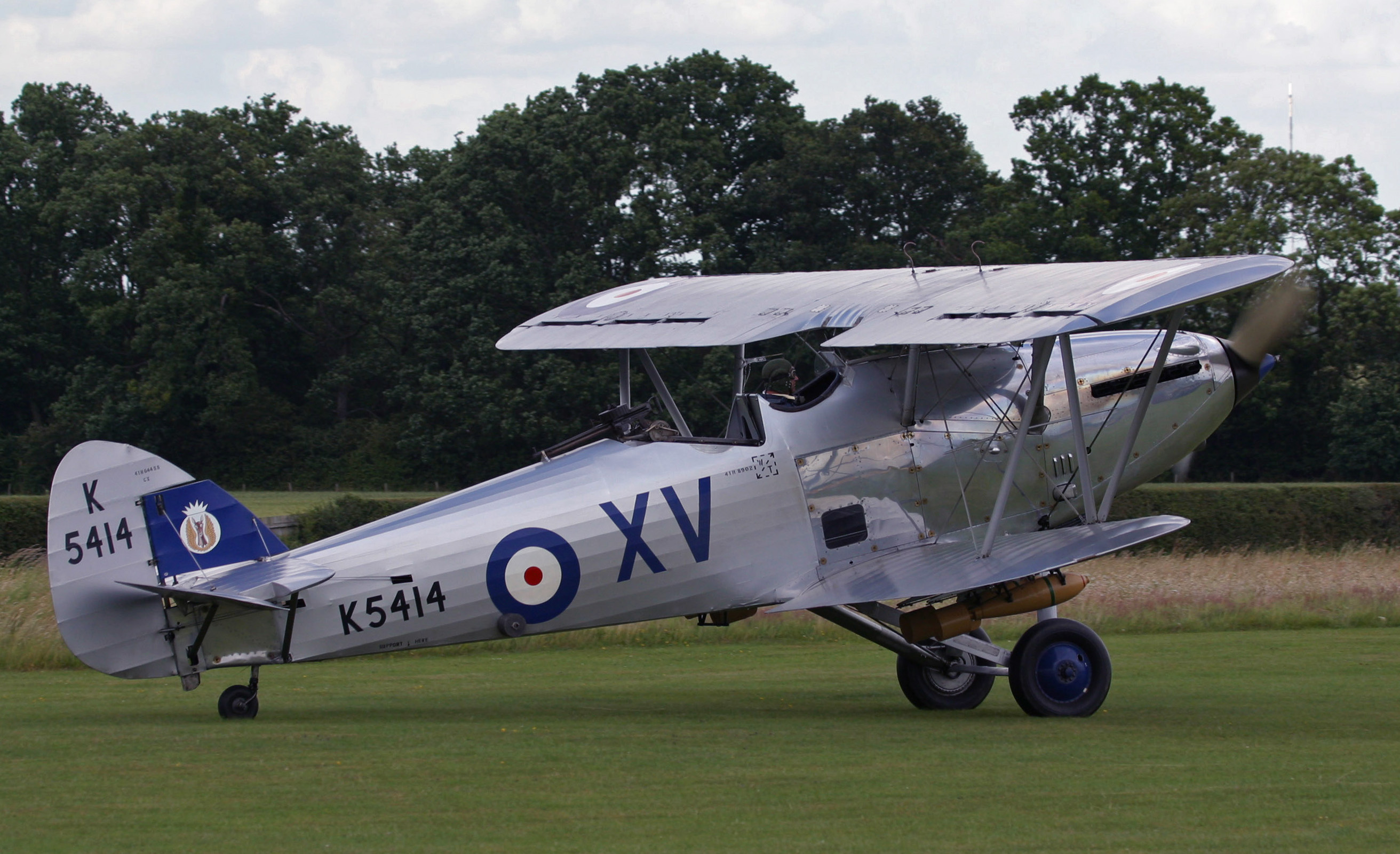
Shuttleworth's Hind (Afghan)

The Hind went into service in November 1935 and eventually equipped 20 RAF bomber squadrons. A number were also sold to foreign customers including Afghanistan, the Republic of Ireland, Latvia, Persia (Iran), Portugal, South Africa, Switzerland, and Yugoslavia. By 1937, the Hind was being phased out of front line service, replaced by the Fairey Battle and Bristol Blenheim, with many of the Auxiliary Air Force squadrons changing their role to fighter or maritime patrol units. At the outbreak of the Second World War, 613 Squadron retained the Hind for army co-operation before re-equipping with the Hart derivative, the Hawker Hector, in November 1939.

The Hind found a new career in 1938 as a training aircraft, representing the next step up from basic training on Tiger Moths. It continued in use as an intermediate trainer during the war. Hind trainers were also operated by Canada and New Zealand. In 1941, Hinds flew operations in their original role as light bombers against Axis forces. South African Hinds were employed against Italian forces in Kenya during the East African Campaign and Yugoslav Hinds were used against the Germans and Italians. Iranian Hinds were used briefly against Allied forces during the Anglo-Soviet invasion of Iran. Imperial Iranian Air Force bases were occupied by the Allies and their aircraft were destroyed or dismantled by the invading British. Hawker Hind aircraft were also used by the Afghan government to suppress the tribal revolts of 1944–1947.

== Variants ==
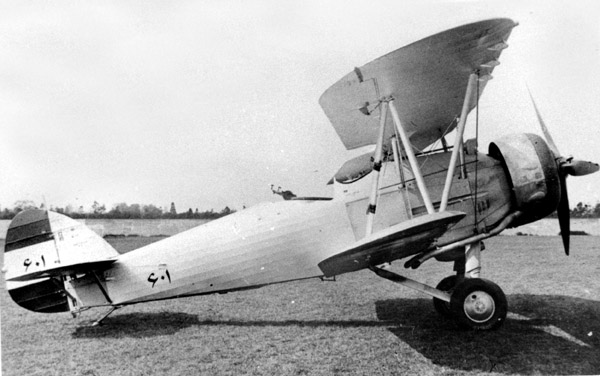
A Bristol Mercury-engined Hind of the Imperial Iranian Air Force

Hind Mk I
Two-seat light bomber aircraft for the RAF, powered by a 477 kW (640 hp) Rolls-Royce Kestrel piston engine.
Afghan Hind
Similar to the Hind Mk I, four aircraft fitted with Rolls-Royce Kestrel V engines, plus another four aircraft fitted with Kestrel UDR engines; eight built for Afghanistan.
Latvian Hind
Two-seat training aircraft, powered by a Bristol Mercury IX radial piston-engine; three built for Latvia.
Persian Hind
Modified version of the Hind Mk I, powered by a Bristol Mercury VIII radial piston-engine; 35 built for Persia.
Portuguese Hind
Similar to the Hind Mk I, two aircraft built as bombers, two aircraft built as trainers; four built for Portugal.
Swiss Hind
Two-seat unarmed communications aircraft; one built for Switzerland.
Yugoslav Hind
Modified version of the Hind Mk I, two aircraft fitted with Rolls-Royce Kestrel XVI piston-engines, one aircraft fitted with a Gnome-Rhone Mistral engine; three built for Yugoslavia.

== Operators ==
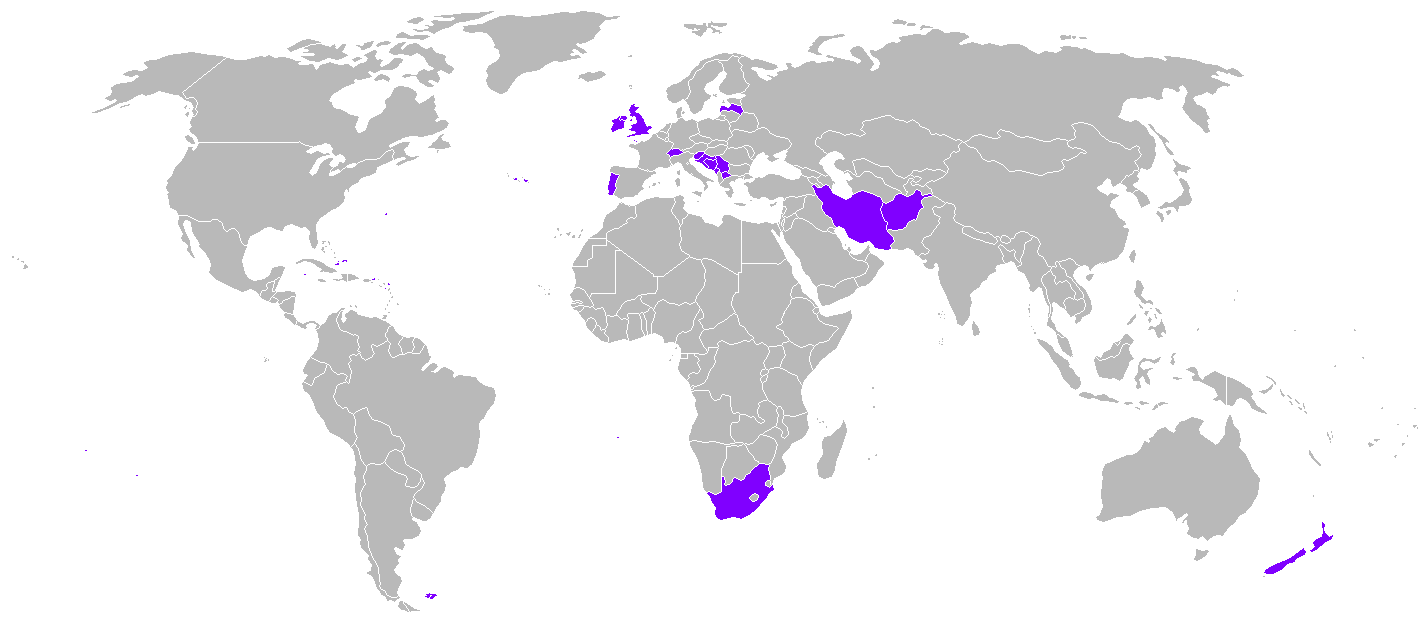
Hind operators

Afghanistan

- Royal Afghan Air Force acquired 8 aircraft in 1938, the final example retiring in 1956

Canada

- Royal Canadian Air Force

Iran

- Imperial Iranian Air Force

Ireland

- Irish Air Corps

Latvia

- Latvian Air Force

New Zealand

- Royal New Zealand Air Force acquired 78 aircraft of which 63 entered service, primarily as trainers 1940–1943. The other 15 were lost to enemy action in transit.
  - No. 3 F.T.S. Ohakea RNZAF
  - No. 6 Squadron RNZAF
  - No. 20 Squadron RNZAF
  - No. 21 Squadron RNZAF
  - No. 22 Squadron RNZAF

Portugal

- Portugal Air Force

South Africa

- South African Air Force

Switzerland

- Swiss Air Force

United Kingdom

- Royal Air Force

- No. 12 Squadron RAF - October 1936 to February 1938
- No. 15 Squadron RAF - March 1936 to July 1938
- No. 18 Squadron RAF - April 1936 to May 1939
- No. 21 Squadron RAF - December 1935 to August 1938
- No. 24 Squadron RAF - Communications use.
- No. 34 Squadron RAF - January 1936 to July 1938
- No. 40 Squadron RAF - March 1936 to August 1938
- No. 44 Squadron RAF - March 1937 to December 1937
- No. 49 Squadron RAF - February 1936 to December 1938
- No. 50 Squadron RAF - May 1937 to January 1939
- No. 52 Squadron RAF - January 1937 to December 1937
- No. 57 Squadron RAF - March 1936 to May 1938
- No. 62 Squadron RAF - May 1937 to March 1938
- No. 63 Squadron RAF - February 1937 to April 1937
- No. 64 Squadron RAF
- No. 82 Squadron RAF - June 1937 to March 1938
- No. 83 Squadron RAF - March 1936 to December 1938
- No. 88 Squadron RAF - June 1937 to December 1937
- No. 90 Squadron RAF - March 1937 to June 1937
- No. 98 Squadron RAF - February 1936 to June 1938
- No. 103 Squadron RAF - August 1936 to August 1938
- No. 104 Squadron RAF - January 1936 to May 1938
- No. 106 Squadron RAF - One flight operated June 1938 to July 1938
- No. 107 Squadron RAF - September 1936 to September 1938

- No. 108 Squadron RAF - January 1937 to June 1938
- No. 110 Squadron RAF - May 1937 to January 1938
- No. 113 Squadron RAF - May 1937 to June 1939
- No. 114 Squadron RAF - December 1936 to March 1937
- No. 139 Squadron RAF - September 1936 to July 1937
- No. 142 Squadron RAF - January 1937 to April 1938
- No. 185 Squadron RAF - March 1938 to July 1938
- No. 211 Squadron RAF - August 1937 to May 1939
- No. 218 Squadron RAF - March 1936 to March 1938
- No. 267 Squadron RAF
- No. 500 Squadron RAF - February 1937 to March 1939
- No. 501 Squadron RAF - March 1938 to March 1939
- No. 502 Squadron RAF - April 1937 to April 1939
- No. 503 Squadron RAF - June 1938 to November 1938
- No. 504 Squadron RAF - May 1937 to November 1938
- No. 602 Squadron RAF - June 1936 to November 1938
- No. 603 Squadron RAF - February 1938 to March 1939
- No. 605 Squadron RAF - August 1936 to January 1939
- No. 609 Squadron RAF - January 1938 to August 1939
- No. 610 Squadron RAF - May 1938 to September 1939
- No. 611 Squadron RAF - April 1938 to May 1939
- No. 613 Squadron RAF - April 1939 to April 1940
- No. 614 Squadron RAF - June 1937 to November 1939
- No. 616 Squadron RAF - November 1938 to January 1939

Yugoslavia

- Royal Yugoslav Air Force

== Surviving aircraft ==
In 1937–39, 28 Hinds were sold to the Afghan government in two batches. After being retired in 1956, two airframes were donated to the United Kingdom in 1967–68. A further two airframes were donated to the National Aeronautical Collection in 1975 by the Afghan president.

- c/n 41.H.8.1899 – Hind on static display at the Royal Air Force Museum London in London.
- c/n 41.H.8.1902 – Hind airworthy with the Shuttleworth Collection in Old Warden, Bedfordshire. It is painted as K5414.
- L7180 – Hind on static display at the Canada Aviation and Space Museum in Ottawa, Ontario. It was flown by the Afghan Air Force through the 1940s and used as an instructional airframe to train aircraft engineers during the 1950s.
- L7181 – Hind under restoration at the Imperial War Museum Duxford in Duxford, Cambridgeshire. It was built in 1937 and served with No. 211 Squadron RAF until being sold to Afghanistan in 1939, and is undergoing long-term restoration by the Historic Aircraft Collection, having previously been in the Canada Aviation Museum collection.
- K6717 – Hind on static display at the Museum of Transport and Technology in Western Springs, Auckland.
- NZ1517 – Hind under restoration to airworthy at the Classic Aircraft Collection in Dairy Flat, Auckland. It was previously operated by the Royal New Zealand Air Force.
- NZ1535 – Hind under restoration to airworthy at the Classic Aircraft Collection in Dairy Flat, Auckland. It was previously operated by the Royal New Zealand Air Force.

== Specifications (Hind) ==
Data from The British Bomber since 1914

General characteristics

- Crew: two
- Length: 29 ft 3 in (8.92 m)
- Wingspan: 37 ft 3 in (11.35 m)
- Height: 10 ft 7 in (3.23 m)
- Wing area: 348 sq ft (32.3 m^{2})
- Empty weight: 3,195 lb (1,449 kg)
- Max takeoff weight: 4,657 lb (2,112 kg)
- Powerplant: 1 × Rolls-Royce Kestrel V water-cooled V12 engine, 640 hp (480 kW)

Performance

- Maximum speed: 185 mph (298 km/h, 161 kn) at 15,500 ft (4,700 m)
- Stall speed: 45 mph (72 km/h, 39 kn)
- Range: 460 mi (740 km, 400 nmi)
- Service ceiling: 26,400 ft (8,000 m)
- Time to altitude: 8 min 6 s to 10,000 ft (3,000 m)

Armament

- Guns: 1 × synchronised forward-firing .303 in (7.7 mm) Vickers gun and 1 × .303 in (7.7 mm) Lewis gun in rear cockpit
- Bombs: Up to 510 lb (230 kg) bombs under wings

== See also ==
Related development

- Hawker Hart
- Hawker Audax
- Hawker Demon

Aircraft of comparable role, configuration, and era

- Fairey Fox
- Vickers Vildebeest

Related lists

- List of aircraft of World War II
- List of aircraft of the Royal Air Force
- List of bomber aircraft
