= List of Army Air Corps aircraft units (United Kingdom) =

Army Air Corps aircraft unit directory

This is a list of British Army Army Air Corps aircraft units.

== Current units ==
=== Wings ===
- Joint Special Forces Aviation Wing (Tri service)

=== Brigades ===
- 1st Aviation Brigade Combat Team

=== Regiments ===
Regiment	Formed at	Formed on	Location	Notes
1 Regiment			RNAS Yeovilton (HMS Heron)	
2 (Training) Regiment			Army Aviation Centre, Middle Wallop Flying Station	
3 Regiment			Wattisham Flying Station	
4 Regiment			Wattisham Flying Station	
5 Regiment		1979	Middle Wallop Flying Station	
6 Regiment (Reserve)			RHQ at Middle Wallop Flying Station	
7 (Training) Regiment			Army Aviation Centre, Middle Wallop Flying Station	
9 Regiment			RAF Shawbury	

=== Squadrons ===
Squadron	Formed at	Formed on	Current aircraft	Unit	Role	Notes
651 Squadron	Feltwell ?	1 Sept 1957 1 Nov 1971	n/a	1 Regiment		previously operated the Defender
652 (Wildcat Fielding) Squadron	Germany	October 1969	AgustaWestland Wildcat AH1	1 Regiment	Aviation Reconnaissance	Became 3 Division Army Aviation HQ 1966
653 Squadron	Kermia, Cyprus ? ?	11 May 1958 1 Nov 1971 Dec 1977	Boeing Apache AH-64E	3 Regiment	Aviation Attack	
656 Squadron	Noble Field, Kuala Lumpur Sek Kong Farnborough	1 Sept 1957 Dec 1969 1978	Boeing Apache AH-64E	4 Regiment	Aviation Attack	
658 Squadron	Germany Netheravon ?	1 Nov 1971 Apr 1978 ?	Eurocopter AS365N3 Dauphin II	Joint Special Forces Aviation Wing (JSFAW)	Special Forces Support	
659 Squadron	Germany	1 Nov 1971	AgustaWestland Wildcat AH1	1 Regiment	Aviation Reconnaissance	
660 Squadron	Netheravon Sek Kong ?	10 Nov 1969 1 Aug 1978 ?	Eurocopter Juno HT1	No. 1 Flying Training School RAF; 2 Maritime Air Wing (2 MAW)	Training	Topcliffe (Apr 1970); First unit to operate the Gazelle AH.1 (6 July 1974); Disbanded (Dec 1977); Formerly No. 11 Flight AAC - Sioux AH.1 & Scout AH.1; Formerly No. 660 Aviation Squadron AAC; Disbanded 20 Dec 1993
661 Squadron	Germany	1 Nov 1978	AgustaWestland Wildcat AH1	1 Regiment	Aviation Reconnaissance	
662 Squadron	Germany	1 Nov 1971	Boeing Apache AH-64E	3 Regiment	Aviation Attack	
663 Squadron	Netheravon	2 Mar 1970	Boeing Apache AH-64E	3 Regiment	Aviation Attack	Belize Airfield, British Honduras - Sioux AH.1 (Jan - Nov 1973); Formerly No. 663 Aviation Squadron AAC
664 Squadron	Farnborough	(1 Nov 1971)	Boeing Apache AH-64E	4 Regiment	Aviation Attack	Belize Airfield, Belize - Sioux AH.1 (1974 - )
668 (Training) Squadron	? ?	Dec 1969 ?	n/a	2 (Training) Regiment	Groundcrew Training	Disbanded (12 Dec 1971)
670 Squadron			Eurocopter Juno HT1	9 Regiment	Training	
671 Squadron			n/a	7 (Training) Regiment	Training	
673 Squadron			Boeing Apache AH-64E	7 (Training) Regiment	Training	
674 Squadron			Grob Tutor T1	Army Aviation Centre	Grading	
675 (The Rifles) Squadron			n/a	6 Regiment (Reserve)	Groundcrew	
676 Squadron			n/a	2 (Training) Regiment	Training	
677 (Suffolk and Norfolk Yeomanry) Squadron			n/a	6 Regiment (Reserve)	Groundcrew	
679 (The Duke of Connaught's) Squadron			n/a	6 Regiment (Reserve)	Groundcrew	

== Former Units ==
=== Former Wings ===
Wing	Formed at	Formed on	Disbanded at	Disbanded on	Notes
No. 1 Wing AAC	Detmold, Germany	1958		1989	
No. 2 Wing AAC	Northern Ireland	1958		1989	
No. 3 Wing AAC	Falaise Airfield, Little Aden	1965	RAF Khormaksar	19 Oct 1967	Previously No. 653 Light Aircraft Squadron AAC; Controlled: 8, 13 and 15 Flights
No. 4 Wing AAC	Singapore	1 October 1965	Singapore	11 Jan 1971	Previously No. 656 Light Aircraft Squadron AAC; Co-located with HQ FARELF

=== Former Regiments ===
Regiment	Location	Dates	Notes
Northern Ireland Regiment		1993	became 5 Regiment Army Air Corps

=== Former Squadrons ===
Squadron	Formed at	Formed on	Disbanded at	Disbanded on	Last unit	Last aircraft	Notes
654 Squadron	? ?	1 Sept 1958 Oct 1969	Wattisham Airfield	Jul 2014	4 Regt	AgustaWestland Apache AH.1	Disbanded 1964
655 Squadron	Germany ?	1 Apr 1962 1969	Middle Wallop Airfield	1 Apr 2014	6 Regt	n/a	Groundcrew; Disbanded 1964; McMunn Barracks, Colchester (1973); Belize Airfield, Belize - Sioux AH.1 (Nov 1973 - 1974)
657 Squadron	Germany Colchester	1 Nov 1971 Apr 1978	RAF Odiham	May 2018	JSFAW	Westland Lynx AH9A	Reformed from 665 Sqn (1978)
665 Squadron	Colchester NI	1 Nov 1971 1 April 1986	JHC FS Aldergrove	31 Oct 2024	5 Regt	Westland Gazelle AH1	Disbanded April 1978)
666 Squadron	Plymouth Netheravon	19 Aug 1969 1 Apr 1986	Airfield Camp, Netheravon	1 Apr 2009	7 Regt	Gazelle AH.1	Previously No. 666 Aviation Squadron AAC; Previously No. 8 Flight AAC; RAF Ballykelly (October 1969); Det: Lisanelly Barracks (Omagh) - Sioux AH.1 and Scout AH.1 (1969); UK (January 1970); RAF Topcliffe (Nov 1970); Disbanded (Apr 1978)
667 Squadron	Netheravon ?	1 Jun 1969 ?	Medicina Lines	2022		Bell 212 AH1/AH3	Became 7 Regiment (1 Jun 1971)
669 Squadron	Germany	1 Jun 1971	Dishforth Airfield	31 Jul 2016	9 Regt	Lynx AH9A	
672 Squadron	Dishforth	1991	Dishforth Airfield	31 Jul 2016	9 Regt	Lynx AH9A	Joined with 656 Sqn (1994)
678 (The Rifles) Squadron			Buckinghamshire; Bedfordshire	Mar 2023	6 Regt	n/a	Groundcrew (Reserve)
Hong Kong Aviation Squadron	Sek Kong	Feb 1969	Sek Kong	Dec 1969		Scout AH.1	Became No. 656 Light Aircraft Squadron AAC
Demonstration and Trials Squadron						Scout AH.1 & Gazelle AH.1	
Chipmunk Squadron						Chipmunk T.10	Middle Wallop (1986)
Basic Rotary Squadron						Gazelle AH.1	Middle Wallop (1986)
Advanced Rotary Squadron						Gazelle AH.1	Middle Wallop (1986)
Operational Training Squadron						Gazelle AH.1, Lynx AH.1 & Scout AH.1	Middle Wallop (1986)
Falkland Islands Squadron (AAC Falklands Squadron)		Jun 1982		31 May 1987			

=== Former Flights ===
Flight	Formed at	Formed on	Disbanded at	Disbanded on	Aircraft operated	Locations used	Notes
1 Flight	Hobart Barracks, Detmold	1 Sept 1957	RAF Aldergrove, NI	Jul 2008	Islander		Formerly No. 1 Reconnaissance Flight AAC (Formerly: No. 1901 Air Observation Post Flight RAF)
2 Flight	Ipoh, Perak RAF Aldergrove, NI Netheravon ?	1 Sept 1957 1962 3 Jan 1966 ?	? ? Seremban Netheravon	? ? Mar 1970 1992	? Auster AOP.9 & Skeeter AOP.12 Auster AOP.9 & Scout AH.1 Gazelle AH.1	Sibu (1966); Seremban (1968)	Formerly No. 2 Reconnaissance Flight AAC (Formerly: No. 1902 Air Observation Post Flight RAF)
3 Flight	? Lisanelly Barracks, Omagh	1 Sept 1957 1 May 1976	? RAF Leuchars	? 2009	Scout AH.1 Sioux AH.1 until October 1977; Gazelle AH.1 from October 1977	Borneo (1965)	Formerly No. 3 Reconnaissance Flight AAC (Formerly: No. 1903 Air Observation Post Flight RAF) Formerly Air Squadron, 15th/19th The King's Royal Hussars; Last user of Sioux in NI
4 Flight		1 Sept 1957					Formerly No. 4 Reconnaissance Flight AAC (Formerly: No. 1904 Air Observation Post Flight RAF)
5 Flight		1 Sept 1957					Formerly No. 5 Reconnaissance Flight AAC (Formerly: No. 1905 Air Observation Post Flight RAF)
6 Flight	Middle Wallop	1 Sept 1957 1993	RAF Shawbury	2009	Sycamore, Skeeter AOP.12, Auster AOP.9; Beaver AL.1 & Alouette II		Formerly No. 6 Independent Depot/Liaison Flight AAC; Formerly No. 6 Independent Liaison Flight AAC (Formerly: No. 1906 (Helicopter) Flight RAF)
6A Flight					Alouette II	Netheravon	
6B Flight					Beaver AL.1	Netheravon	
7 Flight	Taiping, Malaya RAF Gatow, Berlin Scout Base, Brunei	1 Sept 1957 ? ?	Terendak Gatow, Berlin Medicina Lines, Brunei	Dec 1969 1994 1 Aug 2021	Auster AOP.9, Scout AH.1 ? Bell 212	Noble Field (1961); Kluang (1961); Brunei Airport (1962-Feb 1963; Kuching (1963); Terendak (1968)	Formerly No. 7 Reconnaissance Flight AAC; Formerly No. 7 Liaison Flight AAC (Formerly: No. 1907 Light Liaison Flight RAF) (Formerly: No. 1907 Air Observation Post Flight RAF) Formerly 'C' Flight (Formerly 'C' Flight, 656 Squadron AAC); Became No. 667 Squadron AAC
8 Flight	Malta ?	1 Sept 1957 ?	RAF Ballykelly Stirling Lines	October 1969 1 Sept 2013	Auster AOP.6(Sept 1957 - Sept 1964); Alouette II (Sept 1961 - Oct 64), Beaver AL.1(1964) Scout AH.1 (1964)	Wilson Field, Nairobi; Kuwait Airport (2 Jul - 19 Oct 1961); RAF Eastleigh (1961); Falaise Airfield, Little Aden (Oct 1964); Det: Thumier (Habilayn) (1964 - 67); RAF Khormaksar (1967); Coypool, Plymouth (1967); RAF Ballykelly (August 1969)	Formerly No. 8 (Independent) Reconnaissance Flight AAC (Formerly: No. 1908 Independent Air Observation Post Flight RAF); Became 666 Aviation Squadron AAC
9 Flight		1 Sept 1957; 1968				Soltau	BAOR. Formerly No. 9 Reconnaissance Flight AAC (Formerly: No. 1909 Air Observation Post Flight RAF)
10 Flight	Lakatamia, Cyprus Dhekelia ?	1 Sept 1957 16 Jan 1961 ?	Kermia Dhekelia ?	May 1958 Jun 1962 ?	Auster AOP.6 Auster AOP.9, Alouette II (Dec 1961 - Jun 1962), Scout AH.1	Long Pasia (1963); Kluang (1964); Netheravon (1967)	Formerly No. 10 Reconnaissance Flight AAC; Formerly No. 10 (Independent) Reconnaissance Flight AAC (Formerly: No. 1910 Air Observation Post Flight RAF); Became No. 653 Light Aircraft Squadron AAC Became Army Air Corps Section (Cyprus) ?
11 Flight	Sembawang, Malaya Kangaw Barracks (Sembawang) Sek Kong	1 Sept 1957 1971 1977	Sembawang ? Sek Kong	11 Jan 1971 1975 1 Aug 1978	Auster AOP.9, Scout AH.1, Sioux AH.1, Gazelle AH.1	Kluang (1962); Brunei Airport (Feb 1963); Kuching (1963); Serembang (1970); Singapore (1971)	Formerly No. 656 Squadron AAC; Formerly No. 11 Reconnaissance/Liaison Flight AAC; Formerly No. 11 ANZUK Flight AAC; Formerly No. 11 Liaison Flight AAC (Formerly: No. 1911 Light Liaison Flight RAF) Formerly RE Air Troop, Jungle Warfare School Became No. 660 Squadron AAC
12 Flight	Wildenrath	1 Sept 1957	Elmpt Station, Germany	2009	Alouette II, Gazelle AH.1		Formerly No. 12 Independent Liaison Flight AAC; Formerly No. 12 Liaison Flight AAC (Formerly: No. 1912 Light Liaison Flight RAF)
13 Flight	RAF Aldergrove, Northern Ireland Sharjah	1 Sept 1957 1967	RAF Khormaksar Sharjah	Oct 1967 1970	Auster AOP.6, T.7; Skeeter (Feb 1960 - 61); Auster AOP. 9 then Scout AH.1 (1964 - 67) Beaver AL.1	RAF Feltwell (Feb 1958); RAF Aldergrove (Jul 1959); Det: RAF St Angelo (Nov 1959 - 61); Falaise Airfield, Little Aden (9 Mar 1961); Det: Thumier (Habilayn) (1964 - 67); RAF Khormaksar (1967) Sharjah (1967 - 70)	Formerly No. 13 Reconnaissance Flight AAC; Formerly No. 13 Liaison Flight AAC (Formerly: No. 1913 Light Liaison Flight RAF) Previously No. 15 Flight AAC
14 Flight	Paroi, Seremban, Malaya ?	1 Sept 1957 ?	Seremban ?	Jan 1970 ?	Auster AOP.9, Beaver AL.1, Scout AH.1 Scout AH.1 & Gazelle AH.1	Kluang (1962); Brunei Airport (1962); Kluang (1963); Seremban (1968) Netheravon	Formerly No. 14 Reconnaissance/Liaison Flight AAC; Formerly No. 14 Reconnaissance Flight AAC (Formerly: No. 1914 Air Observation Post Flight RAF)
15 Flight	Lakatamia, Cyprus ?	1 Sept 1957 1959	Kermia RAF Khormaksar	May 1958 Oct 1967	Beaver AL.1	Falaise Airfield, Little Aden (9 Mar 1961); Det: Thumier (Habilayn) (1964 - 67); RAF Khormaksar (1967)	Formerly No. 15 Independent Liaison Flight AAC (Formerly: No. 1915 Independent Air Observation Post Flight RAF) (Formerly: No. 1915 Light Liaison Flight RAF); Became No. 653 Light Aircraft Squadron AAC Became No. 13 Flight AAC
16 Flight	Noble Field, Kuala Lumpur Dhekelia, Cyprus	Late 1950s 1967	Klulang Dhekelia	1 Oct 1964 3 Jun 2003	Auster AOP.9 Sioux AH.1 (- 1977), Alouette II (1977 - 1988); Gazelle AH.1 (1988 - 2003)	Kluang (1962)	Formerly No. 16 Reconnaissance Flight AAC; Became Air Squadron, 4th Royal Tank Regiment Formerly No. 16 Aviation Flight AAC; Formerly Infantry Air Platoon Cyprus
17 Flight							
18 Flight	Detmold	1969			Alouette II		BAOR
19 Flight		1964			Beaver AL.1	Nicosia; Aden (Jun 1964)	Formerly No. 19 Liaison Flight AAC
20 Flight	Sha Tin, Hong Kong	1 Sept 1957			Auster AOP.6 (1965) Sioux AH.1 (October 1966)	Kai Tak (1962); Seremban (Jul 1966); Sek Kong (1969)	Formerly No. 20 Independent Reconnaissance Flight AAC (Formerly: No. 1900 Air Observation Post Flight RAF)
21 Flight		1961		1967	Auster AOP.6 & Scout AH.2	Nicosia (1964); Farnborough (Jun 1964)	Formerly No. 21 Reconnaissance Flight AAC
22 Flight				1962			
23 Flight		1969					
24 Flight	RAF Gütersloh, Germany	Jun 1962			Alouette II	Detmold (1962); Atkinson Field, British Guiana (Jun 1964 - Jan 1965)	BAOR; Formerly No. 24 Reconnaissance Flight
25 Flight	Atkinson Field, British Guiana Airport Camp, Belize Kenya	1965 Apr 1984 ?	Atkinson Field Airport Camp Nanyuki, Kenya	1966 15 Jul 2011 Sept 2015	Alouette II (1965) Gazelle AH.1 (1984 - ?), Lynx AH.7 (May 1997 - 2003) & Bell 212 (2003 - 11) Bell 212	Atkinson Field, British Guiana (Jun 1965 - May 1966)	British Guiana Previously Army Air Corps Detachment Belize BATUK
26 Flight							
27 Flight					Alouette II	Atkinson Field, British Guiana (Jan - Jun 1965)	BAOR
29 (BATUS) Flight	Suffield, Canada	1972	Suffield, Canada	(Note: Placed in suspended animation) Oct 2021	Gazelle AH.1		5 Regiment AAC had administrative responsibility for 29 (BATUS) Flight.
132 Flight		1966		1974			
Beaver Flight	Topcliffe	1968			Beaver AL.1	Aldergrove (1976), Middle Wallop	Previously No. 15 Flight AAC
'C' Flight, 656 Squadron AAC	Scout Base, Seria, Brunei	1970			Sioux AH.1 ( - 1978); Scout AH.1 (1978 - )		
UNFICYP Flight	Nicosia, Cyprus	15 Aug 1966	Nicosia	30 Sept 1994	Sioux AH.1, Alouette II (1977 - 1988); Gazelle AH.1 (1988 - 1994)		Part of the United Nations Peacekeeping Force in Cyprus.
Army Air Corps Section (Cyprus)	Dhekelia	Jun 1962	Dhekelia	Mar 1964	Auster AOP.9 & Sioux AH.1		Formerly No. 10 Reconnaissance Flight AAC; Became Air Platoon, 3rd Battalion, the Green Jackets
Light Aircraft Pilot	Ogle Airstrip, British Guiana (near Georgetown)	1966	Ogle Airstrip	Oct 1966	Cessna 185B Skywagon		
Army Air Corps Detachment Belize	Belize Airfield, Belize	1 Nov 1976	Airport Camp	Apr 1984	Scout AH.1; Gazelle AH.1 (1981 - 84)		
Gazelle Conversion Flight/ Advanced Rotary Wing Flight					Scout AH.1 & Gazelle AH.1	Middle Wallop	
Advanced Fixed-Wing Flight					Beaver AL.1 & Chipmunk T.10; Islander AL.1	Middle Wallop	
Intermediate Fixed-Wing Flight (Note: Flack says this was the Initial Fixed Wing Flight)					Chipmunk T.10	Middle Wallop	
BATUS Flight	Suffield				Beaver ( - 1984) & Gazelle AH.1		
Demonstration & Trials Flight					Gazelle AH.1, Lynx AH.1 & Scout AH.1	Middle Wallop (1986)	
Historic Aircraft Flight					Sioux AH.1, Skeeter AOP.10 & Auster AOP.9	Middle Wallop (1986)	

=== Other units ===
- The Light Aircraft School RAF became the Army Air Corps Centre

Integrated Flight Scheme units

- Air Platoon, Irish Guards - Sioux AH.1 (1966)
- Air Platoon, Scots Guards - Sioux AH.1 (1966)
- Air Squadron, Scots Dragoon Guards - Sioux AH.1 - Harewood Barracks, Herford (1971) - Long Kesh (October 1971) & Long Kesh (1972)
- Air Squadron, 1st Queen's Dragoon Guards - Auster AOP.6 and Skeeter AOP.12 at Aldergrove (1964) then Sioux AH.1, moved to Aden (November 1966)
  - Air Troop - Skeeter AOP.12 (1962), Auster AOP.6 then Sioux AH.1 (1965)
- Air Troop, 4th/7th Royal Dragoon Guards - Sioux AH.1 (1965) to NI (1966) from Aden - to BAOR (March 1969) then disbanded
- Air Squadron, Life Guards - Sioux AH.1 (1966)
- Air Squadron, 14th/20th Hussars - Sioux AH.1 (1972 - 73)
- Air Squadron, 15th/19th The King's Royal Hussars - Omagh - became No. 3 Flight AAC on 1 May 1976
- Air Troop, 10th Royal Hussars - Sioux AH.1 (1964)
- Air Squadron, 16th/5th Queen's Royal Lancers - Sioux AH.1 - NI (1971) - Omagh (1972) - departed NI (1973)
- Air Squadron, 17th/21st Lancers - Sioux AH.1 at Aldergrove, NI (1969) - Det at Ballykelly (1971) - squadron moved to Lisanelly Barracks (1971) - moved to Germany (October 1971)
- Air Squadron, 1st Royal Tank Regiment - Sioux AH.1 (1976)
- Air Squadron, 2nd Royal Tank Regiment - Auster AOP.9 (1962) - Lisanelly Barracks, Omagh (1973)
- Air Squadron, 4th Royal Tank Regiment - Auster AOP.9 (1964) (previously 16 Flight)
  - Air Troop - Falaise Airfield, Little Aden - Auster AOP.9 (1963)
- Air Squadron, 5th Royal Tank Regiment
  - Air Troop - Seremban (1965)
  - Air Troop - Brunei Airport (1965)
- Air Platoon, 40 Commando RM (1965)
- Air Troop, 42 Commando RM (1967)
- Air Troop, 45 Commando RM - Sioux AH.1 (1967)
- Salerno Flight, 41 Commando (1971)
- Montforterbrook Flight, 45 Commando (1971)
- Kangaw Flight, 3 Commando Brigade Air Squadron - Sioux AH.1 in NI (1972)
- Air Platoon, the Northumberland Fusiliers - Sioux AH.1 (1965)
- Air Platoon, 1st Battalion King's Somerset Light Infantry (1967) - Sioux AH.1
- Air Platoon, 1st Battalion Prince of Wales's Own Regiment of Yorkshire - Ballykinler, Ballykelly, NI (1969) then UK (August 1969)
- Air Platoon, 2nd Battalion, the Royal Anglian Regiment - Auster AOP.9 (1964) - became Infantry Air Platoon Cyprus
- Air Platoon, 3rd Battalion, the Green Jackets - Auster AOP.9 (March 1964) - previously Army Air Corps Section (Cyprus)
- Air Platoon, 3rd Battalion, The Light Infantry - disbanded April 1969
- Air OP Troop, 1 Regiment Royal Horse Artillery - Sioux AH.1 (1965)
- Air OP Troop, 4 Light Regiment RA - Sioux AH.1 (1966)
- Air OP Troop, 14 Light Regiment RA - disbanded November 1969
- Air OP Troop, 19 Light Regiment RA - Sioux AH.1 (1965)
- Air OP Troop, 25 Light Regiment RA - Sioux AH.1 (1969)
- Air OP Troop, 40 Light Regiment RA - Sioux AH.1 (1966)
- Air OP Troop, 45 Light Regiment RA (1965)
- Air OP Troop, 49 Light Regiment RA - Sioux AH.1 (1965)
- Air OP Troop, 95 Commando Light Regiment RA (1967)
- Air Troop, 249 Signals Squadron (1967) Disbanded March 1969
- Air Platoon, 1st Battalion, the Gordon Highlanders - Scout AH.1 (1965)
- Air Platoon, 1st Battalion, 2nd King Edward VII's Own Gurkha Rifles (The Sirmoor Rifles) - Sioux AH.1 - Seria, Brunei (1967)
- Air Platoon, 6th Gurkha Rifles - Sek Kong (1965)
- Air Platoon, 7th Duke of Edinburgh's Gurkha Rifles (1967)
- Air Platoon, 1st Battalion, 10th Gurkha Rifles - Sioux AH.1 (1966)
- 30 Flight RASC - Beaver AL.1 (8 April 1964 - 15 July 1965) - became 130 Flight RCT
- 130 Flight RCT - Beaver AL.1 (1968) - Middle Wallop (1970)
- 28 ANZUK Aviation Squadron - Sioux AH.1
- RE Air Troop, Jungle Warfare School, Johore - became 11 Flight AAC - Sioux AH.1
- Infantry Air Platoon Cyprus - Dhekelia - Sioux AH.1 (1966) - previously Air Platoon, 2nd Battalion, the Royal Anglian Regiment - became No. 16 Aviation Flight AAC

== Deployments ==
=== Cyprus ===
Flights that supported the United Nations Peacekeeping Force in Cyprus (UNFICYP) between 27 March 1964 and 15 August 1966:

- 19 and 21 Flight's (Mar - Jun 1964)
- 3 Flight (Aug 1964 - Feb 1965)
- 6 Flight (Feb - Aug 1965)
- 21 Flight (Aug 1965 - Feb 1966)
- AOP Troop, 4 Light Regiment RA (Feb - Aug 1966)

=== Northern Ireland ===
Deployed squadrons to Northern Ireland during the Troubles

- 666 Squadron at Ballykelly (1969)
- 660 Squadron at Ballykelly between 1970 and July 1970
- 663 Aviation Squadron at Long Kesh Airfield between July and October 1970
- 653 Aviation Squadron between October 1970 and February 1971
- 664 Parachute Aviation Squadron from February 1971 until June 1971
- 665 Aviation Squadron between June and October 1971
- 653 Squadron from October 1971 at Long Kesh)
- 666 Squadron between October 1971 and February 1972
- 663 Aviation Squadron from February 1972
- Flight from 651 Aviation Squadron from February 1972 at Aldergrove (Scout)
- Flight from 657 Aviation Squadron from February 1972 at Long Kesh (Sioux)
- 651 Aviation Squadron at Lisanelly Barracks (1972)
- 654 Squadron at Long Kesh (1972)
- 653 Squadron at Aldergrove (1972) - replaced by 665
- 665 Aviation Squadron at Aldergrove (1972)
- 652 Squadron (1973)
- 660 Squadron (Summer 1973)
- 666 Squadron (1973)
- 663 Squadron (November 1973)
- 657 Squadron - Soltau, Germany to Ballykelly - Det at Piggery Ridge, Londonderry. - Det at Magherafelt. Replaced by 661 (1974)
- 661 Squadron - Ballykelly (1974)
- 664 Squadron (1974)
- Flights from 662 (Scout AH.1) and 669 Squadrons (Sioux AH.1) as a composite - Long Kesh (1974)
- 655 Squadron (1974)
- Beaver AL.1 detachment at Aldergrove (1975)
- 651 Squadron (1975)
- 660 Squadron at Long Kesh from July 1975 (Gazelle AH.1)
- 662 Squadron (1975)
- 658 Squadron from November 1976
- 655 Squadron (1977) - returned to Detmold
- 662 Squadron (1977)
- 655 Squadron (1978)
- 659 Squadron (1978)
- 655 Squadron (1979)
