= No. 1 Wing AAC =

1 Wing Army Air Corps
- Active: 1958-1989
- Country: United Kingdom
- Branch: British Army
- Size: Wing
- Part of: Army Air Corps

No. 1 Wing AAC is a former Wing of the British Army's Army Air Corps which was based in West Germany in support of the British Army of the Rhine.

== Structure ==
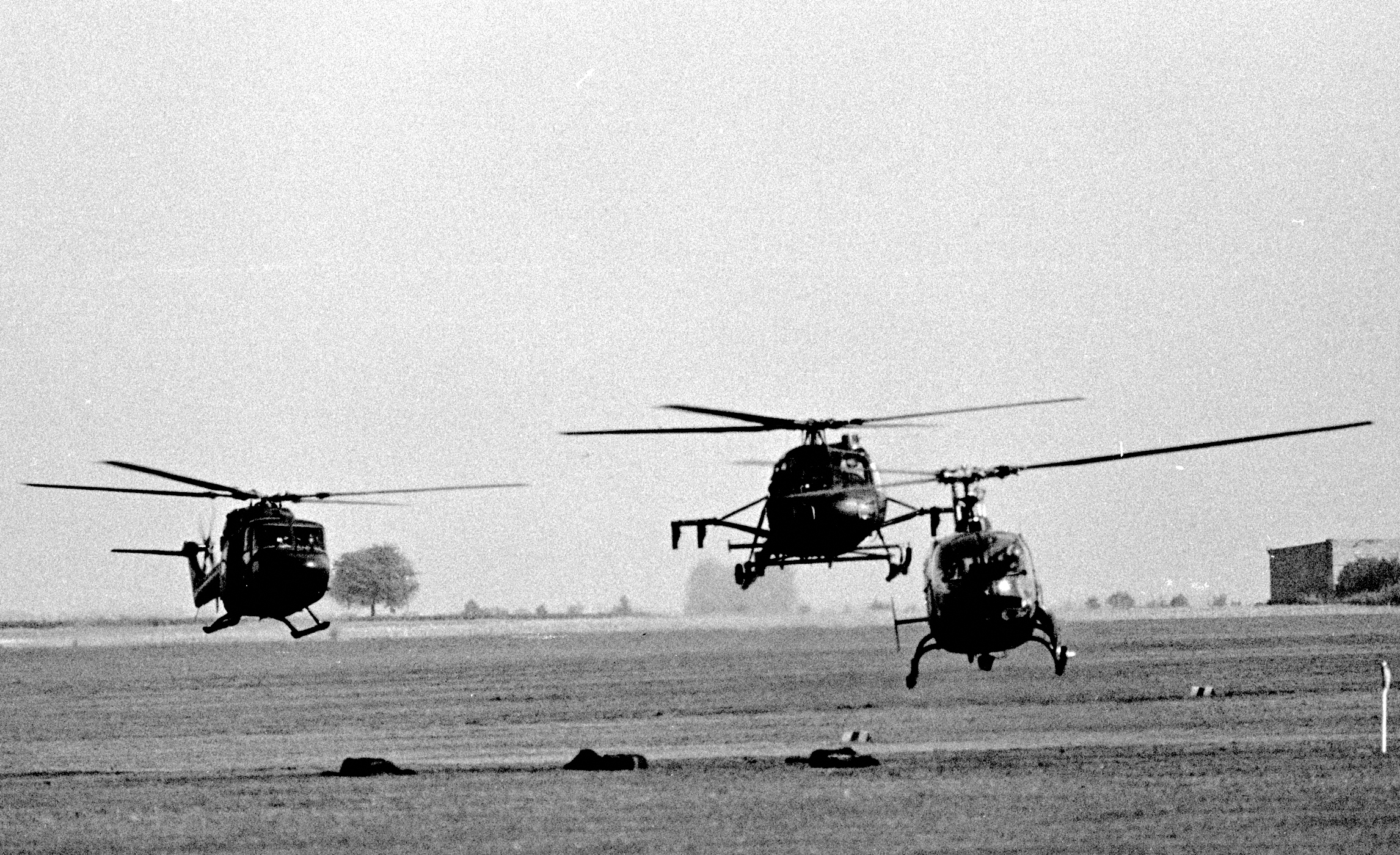
Westland Lynx, Westland Scout and Westland Gazelle helicopters (left to right) of 1 Regiment Army Air Corps in Hildesheim, West Germany in 1980.

1958-1961 | Detmold

- 652 Squadron at Detmold (1+9 Flights)
- 654 Squadron at Hildesheim (4+5)
- 12 Flight (BAOR HQ Flight) at Wildenrath

1961-1964 | Detmold

- 652 Squadron at Detmold (1+9)
- 654 Squadron at Hildesheim (4+5)
- 655 Squadron at Detmold (23+24)
- 12 Flight (BAOR HQ Flight) at Wildenrath

1964-1970 | Detmold

- 12 Flight (BAOR HQ Flight) at Wildenrath
- 18 Flight (HQ 1 Corps Flight) at Detmold

1971-1976 | Detmold

- 669 Squadron at Wildenrath
- 9 Regiment | Detmold
  - 655 Squadron at Detmold
  - 669 Squadron at Detmold

1989

- 1 Regiment | Tofrek Barracks (Tofrek East) (Hildesheim) - Formerly at Detmold
  - 651 Squadron
  - 652 Squadron
- 3 Regiment | Salamanca Barracks (Soest)
  - 653 Squadron
  - 662 Squadron
  - 663 Squadron
- 4 Regiment | Hobart Barracks (Detmold)
  - 654 Squadron
  - 659 Squadron

== See also ==
- List of Army Air Corps aircraft units
