= No. 2 Wing AAC =

2 Wing Army Air Corps
- Active: 1958-1989
- Country: United Kingdom
- Branch: British Army
- Size: Wing
- Part of: Army Air Corps

No. 2 Wing AAC is a former wing of the British Army's Army Air Corps which was based in the United Kingdom.

== Structure ==
- 5 Regiment in Northern Ireland
  - 655 Squadron at Shackleton Barracks (Ballykelly)
  - 665 Squadron at RAF Aldergrove

== See also ==
- No. 1 Wing AAC
- List of Army Air Corps aircraft units
