= 657 Squadron =

657 Squadron may refer to two military units of the United Kingdom:

- No. 657 Squadron RAF, 1943–1955
- No. 657 Squadron AAC, 1973–2018
