= RAF Westley =

Former Royal Air Force airfield

RAF Westley
- Bury St Edmunds, Suffolk in England

Site information
- Type: Royal Air Force airfield
- Owner: Air Ministry
- Operator: Royal Air Force
- Controlled by: RAF Army Cooperation Command

Location
- Shown within Suffolk
- Coordinates: 52°14′55″N 000°40′55″E

Site history
- Built: 1938
- In use: 1938-1946

Airfield information
- Elevation: 60 metres (197 ft) AMSL
Runways
Direction	Length and surface
00/00	Grass

RAF Westley is a former Royal Air Force satellite airfield located to the west of Bury St Edmunds, Suffolk, England, between 1938 and 1946. It was established by the Straight Corporation which set up the West Suffolk Aero Club in May 1938, before the airfield was taken over by the RAF Volunteer Reserve.

== History ==
In 1942 No. 652 AOP Squadron moved in to provide training, using de Havilland Tiger Moths and Taylorcraft Austers. This continued until 1943.

The following units were also here at some point:

- No. 241 Squadron RAF (April - July 1941)
- No. 268 Squadron RAF (September 1940 - April 1941
- No. 656 Squadron RAF (December 1942 - March 1943)
- No. 657 Squadron RAF (May - June 1943)
- No. 662 Squadron RAF (February - June 1944)
- No. 103 Gliding School RAF (October 1943 - April 1944 & June - December 1946)

== Current use ==
By 1946 the airfield closed and is now the site of the Westley suburb of Bury St Edmunds.
