= RAF Habilayn =

Former British army airfield in Yemen

RAF Habilayn
- Al Habilayn, Radfan district in Yemen
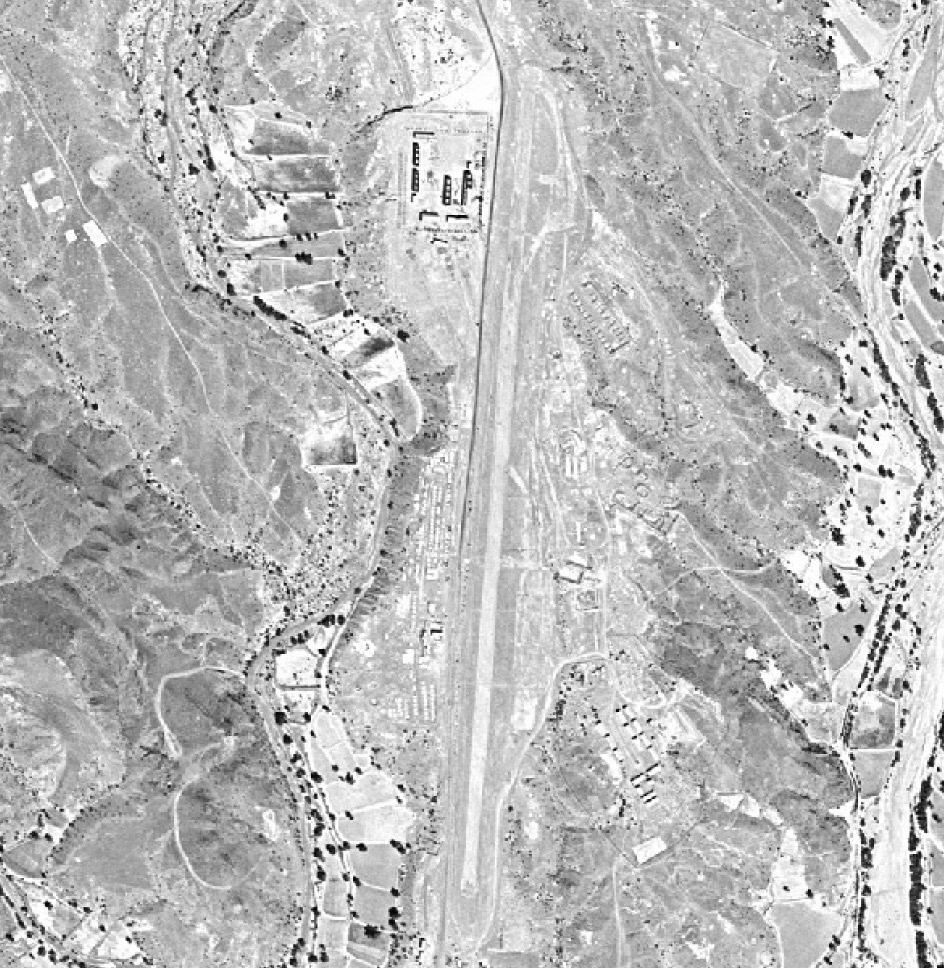
- Declassified satellite imagery of Habilayn Airfield captured by KH-9 on 1 November 1974.

Site information
- Type: Defunct
- Owner: Ministry of Defence
- Operator: Royal Air Force; Army Air Corps
- Condition: Demolished

Location
- Shown within Yemen RAF Habilayn (Middle East)
- Coordinates: 13°31′27.26″N 44°51′02.68″E

Site history
- Built: January 1964
- In use: 1964 - 1967
- Battles/wars: Aden Emergency * Radfan Campaign

Royal Air Force Habilayn or more commonly RAF Habilayn is a former Royal Air Force station located in Al Habilayn, Radfan district, Yemen. The station served as an important forwarding base for British troops during the Radfan Campaign in the Aden Emergency. It was primarily operated by the Royal Air Force and Army Air Corps before being abandoned in 1967.

== History ==
In January 1964, RAF Thumier was constructed by the Royal Engineers, which included an airstrip and a fuel storage dump. Following this, the Royal Air Force deployed aircraft to the airfield including Belvederes, Beverly's, Twin Pioneers, and Beavers. The No. II Squadron RAF Regiment was tasked with supplying and defending the base. Additionally, the 45 Commando, Royal Marines was deployed to be in charge with securing access roads to the base.

=== Radfan campaign ===
During the Radfan Campaign in 1964, RAF Thumier served as an important staging base of operations in Area West. It covered continuous unrest in the Radfan hills and the border with Yemen. In 1964, the airstrip was extended to cater the operation of Beverly transports, and helicopters. This also allowed the transportation of additional ground troops. During the time, it served as a forward base for the supply of British troops deployed in the Radfan area. A squadron of Wessex helicopters from aircraft carrier HMS Centaur arrived at the airfield, and were immediately serviced to fly in supplies and equipment to forward positions. Operations involved the Westland Wessex helicopters of the 815 Naval Air Squadron and the No. 78 Squadron RAF’s Scottish Aviation Twin Pioneers. By 1966, RAF Thumier was renamed to RAF Habilayn. It consisted of a long hard surfaced strip maintained by the constant application of used engine oil, which splatters on the underside of landing aircraft when freshly treated. The runway was capable of taking aircraft including the Blackburn Beverly, Vickers Valetta, and Douglas DC-3. The Army Air Corps maintained an armed Scout helicopter on permanent detachment at the base, and a number of Bell Sioux AH.1 observation helicopters, while de Havilland Canada Beaver AL.1s of the AAC frequently overnighted. On a daily basis, the No. 78 Squadron RAF’s Wessex helicopters occupied the strip to fly re-supply sorties to British troops stationed in the hills. This in turn, required a couple of aircraft from RAF Khormaksar to be stationed on rotation. On 26 February 1967, a Sioux AH.1 helicopter of the 45 Commando Air Troop crash landed on the runway. The main rotors struck the runway during landing, which caused the aircraft to destabilize and roll over. Despite the rollover, the pilot escaped without injury.

== Operations ==
External videos
- RAF Habilayn photos taken between 1966-67 (Part 1)
- RAF Habilayn photos taken between 1966-67 (Part 2)

Twin Pioneers from the No. 78 Squadron RAF and AAC Beavers flew daily Aircraft Delivery Service flights from Aden, delivering mail, urgent spare parts, and personnel. The No. 84 Squadron RAF’s Blackburn Beverly flew heavy equipment to the airfield, while bulk stores were only delivered by Army trucks under armed escort. Communications were manned by personnel 24 hours a day, and a detachment of the RAF Crash Crew provided rescue services. PSP metal sheeting was laid on the apron for helicopter parking and in cargo loading areas, the whole being reverted. Communications were manned by personnel 24 hours a day, while a detachment of the RAF Crash Crew serviced rescue operations. Between 22 May and 25 June 1964, the 815 Naval Air Squadron, HMS Centaur, daily flew Wessex HAS.1 helicopters into the airfield. During the operation, only an aircraft was lost on 10 June.

=== Habilayn Army Camp ===
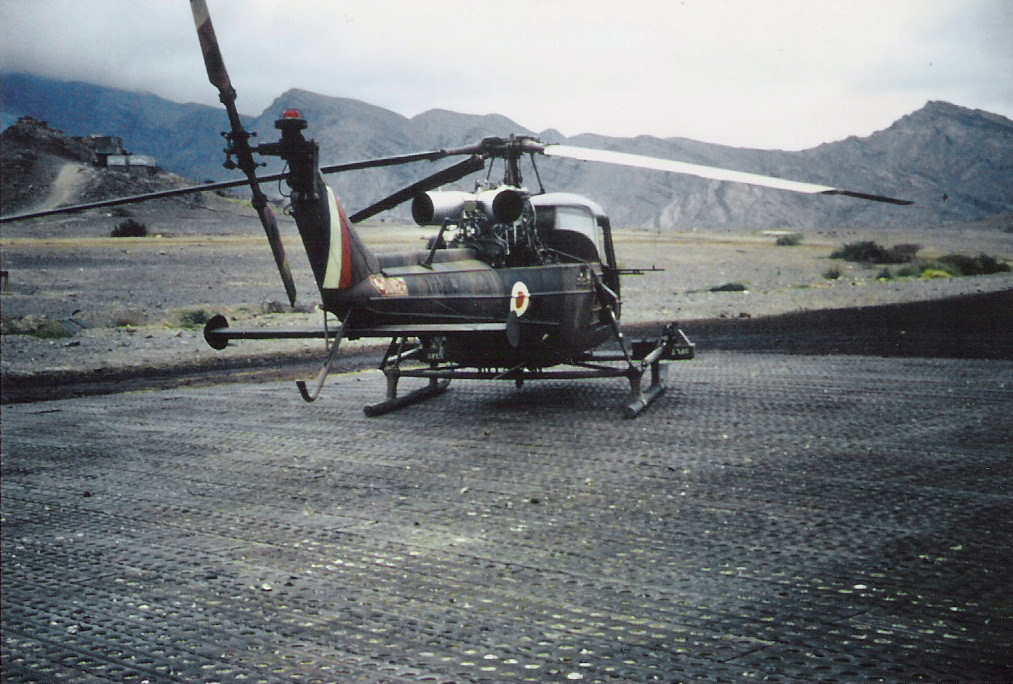
Westland Scout AH.1 XR628, 8 Flight AAC, Habilayn 1967, armed with two skid mounted GPMG'S and one pintle mounted GPMG in the cabin.

RAF Habilayn also operated a permanent army camp, which consisted of tented encampments and protection by stone walls up to 3 feet high. There was also a communications tent and mast. It was large enough to accommodate a battalion-sized force of approximately 600 men, who were rotated every two months from Aden. There was a joint Army/RAF element stationed in the camp. The 45 Commando mainly served as medical staff in the camp. In 1966, the 523 Specialist Team used a civilian contractor and a section from the 20 Field Squadron to expand the camp. Every rotation of an army battalion, the signs received a change of colour, and the stone pathways were painted accordingly. In June 1967, the 45 Commando was withdrawn from the base.

== See also ==
- RAF Khormaksar
