= No. 7 Flight AAC =

No. 7 Flight Army Air Corps
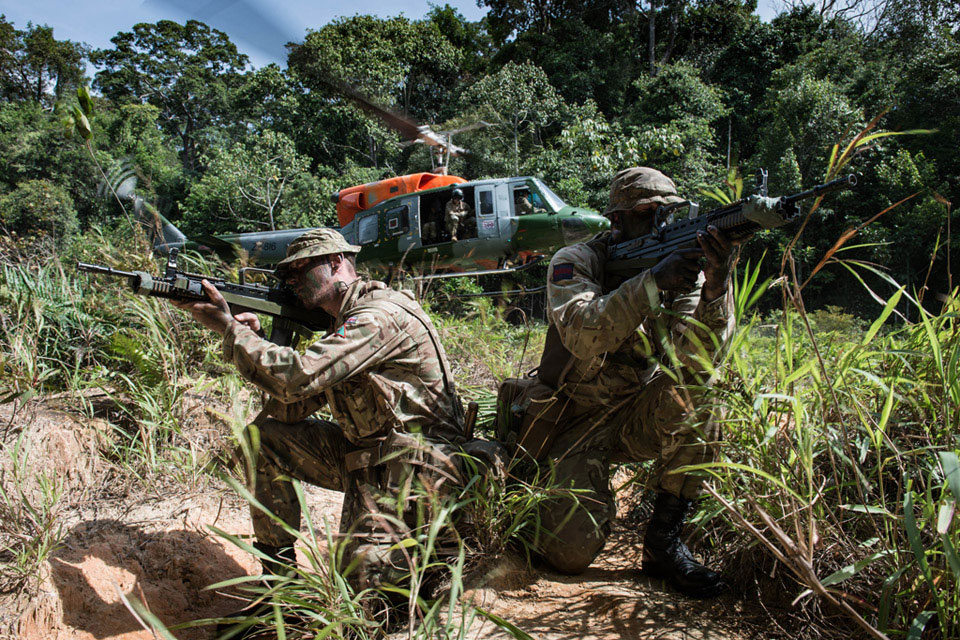
- Bell 212 of the No. 7 Flight AAC supporting the Household Cavalry Regiment during a training exercise in the jungles of Brunei in 2017.
- Active: 1 September 1957 – 1 August 2021
- Country: United Kingdom
- Branch: British Army
- Type: Helicopter flight
- Role: Transport
- Part of: Army Air Corps
- Last home base: Medicina Lines, Seria, Brunei Darussalam

Aircraft flown
- Helicopter: Bell 212 AH1/AH3

No. 7 Flight Army Air Corps (No. 7 Flt AAC) was an independent flight of the British Army's Army Air Corps, latterly based at the British garrison at Medicina Lines in Seria, Brunei, on the island of Borneo.

== History ==
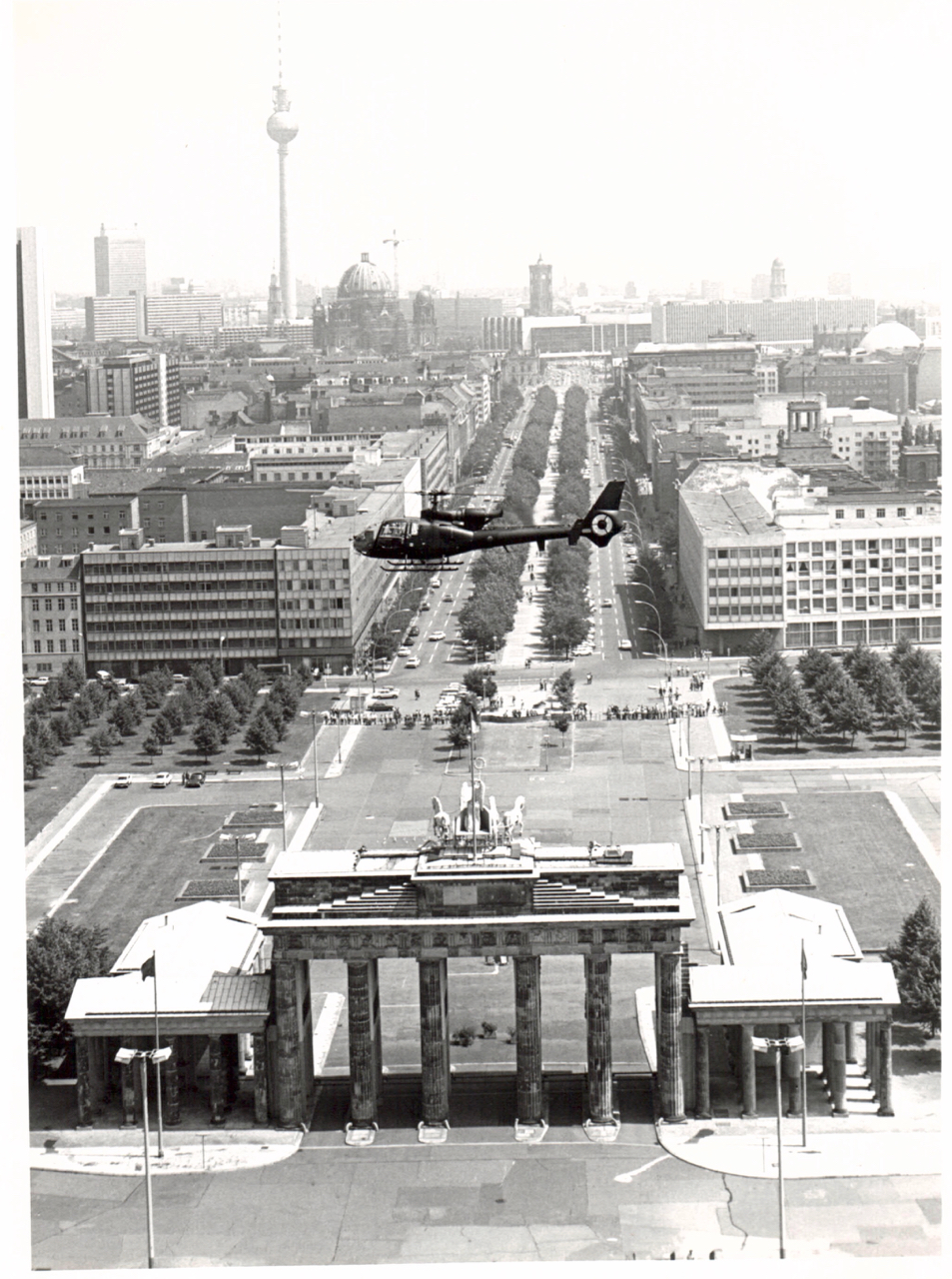
7 Flt AAC Gazelle over Brandenburg Gate in 1983 over Berlin, Germany.

The flight was originally formed as No. 7 Reconnaissance Flight Army Air Corps in 1 September 1957; 68 years ago, at what was then known as Taiping, British Malaya and was part of No. 656 Squadron AAC. On 24 December 1962, 7 Recce Flight AAC then moved to Brunei on the island of Borneo, and remained there until 31 December 1966, when it was disbanded.

No. 7 Flight Army Air Corps was re-formed in 1970; 56 years ago, at RAF Gatow in Berlin, where it operated Bell Sioux AH.1, and from 1977 until 1994, Westland Gazelle AH.1 helicopters. It was part of the Berlin Infantry Brigade. It was disbanded October 1994, and then returning to Borneo, it reformed on 1 November 1994 at Seria in Brunei, where it supported the resident infantry battalion from the Brigade of Gurkhas, and the Training Team Brunei (TTB), which runs jungle warfare training courses. The flight used Bell 212 AH1 and AH3 light helicopters.

On 1 August 2021; 4 years ago, the flight was expanded and raised to squadron size, and consequently re-designated as No. 667 Squadron AAC.

== See also ==
- Royal Gurkha Rifles
- British Army Jungle Warfare Training School
- List of Army Air Corps aircraft units
