= No. 1 Flight AAC =

- Active: 1957–2008
- Country: United Kingdom
- Branch: Army Air Corps

No. 1 Flight AAC was an independent flight within the British Army's Army Air Corps. It was formerly No. 1 Reconnaissance Flight AAC and before that No. 1901 Air Observation Post Flight RAF

Aircraft operated:

- Saunders-Roe Skeeter AOP.12
- Westland Sioux AH.1
- Westland Scout AH.1
- de Havilland Canada Beaver AL.1
- Britten-Norman Islander AL.1

== See also ==
- List of Army Air Corps aircraft units
