= 4 Regiment Army Air Corps =

4 Regiment Army Air Corps 4th Division Aviation 1969-1973
- Active: 24 October 1969 – present
- Country: United Kingdom
- Branch: British Army
- Type: Aviation
- Size: Regiment; 404 personnel
- Part of: Attack Helicopter Force

Insignia
- Squadron Badge heraldry: The Regimental emblem is the Army Air Corps Cap Badge with the Roman numerals IV beneath.

4 Regiment Army Air Corps is a regiment of the Army Air Corps (AAC).

== History ==
- Detmold | 1964-1970 | 1, 23 & 24 Flights
- HQ at Detmold | 1971-1976 | 654 Squadron at Minden | 661 at Herford | 662 at Minden
- Detmold | 1977-1980 | 654 & 664
- Detmold | 1981-1983 | 654 & 664
- Detmold | 1983-1990 | HQ, 654, 659 & 669
- Deployed as part of the Gulf War with Lynx and Gazelle helicopter.
- Detmold | 1990-1994 | HQ, 654, 659 & 669
- Detmold | 1994-1995
- UK | 1995-present

== Structure ==
The regiment consists of:

- No. 654 Squadron AAC (Regimental Headquarters)
- No. 656 Squadron AAC
- No. 664 Squadron AAC

== See also ==
- List of Army Air Corps aircraft units
