= British Army Jungle Warfare Training School =

Military training unit of British Forces Brunei

Coordinates: 4°36.481′N 114°19.507′E

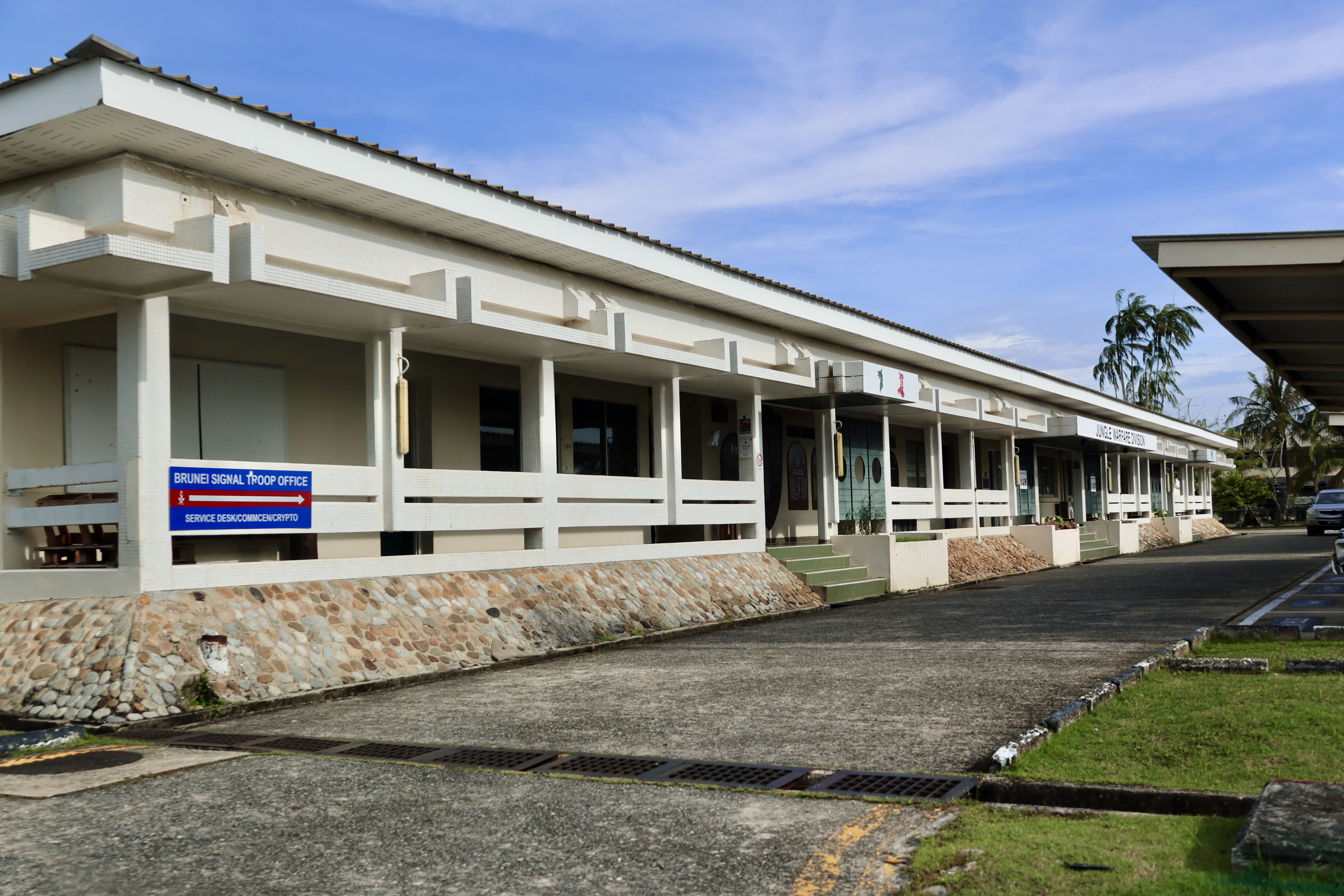
- Medicina Lines, headquarters of the Jungle Warfare Training School
- Countries: originally: Malaysia currently: Brunei
- Branch: British Army
- Type: military training
- Role: jungle warfare training
- Part of: British Forces Brunei
- Headquarters: Medicina Lines, Mukim Seria, Belait District
- Nickname: Training Team Brunei (TTB)

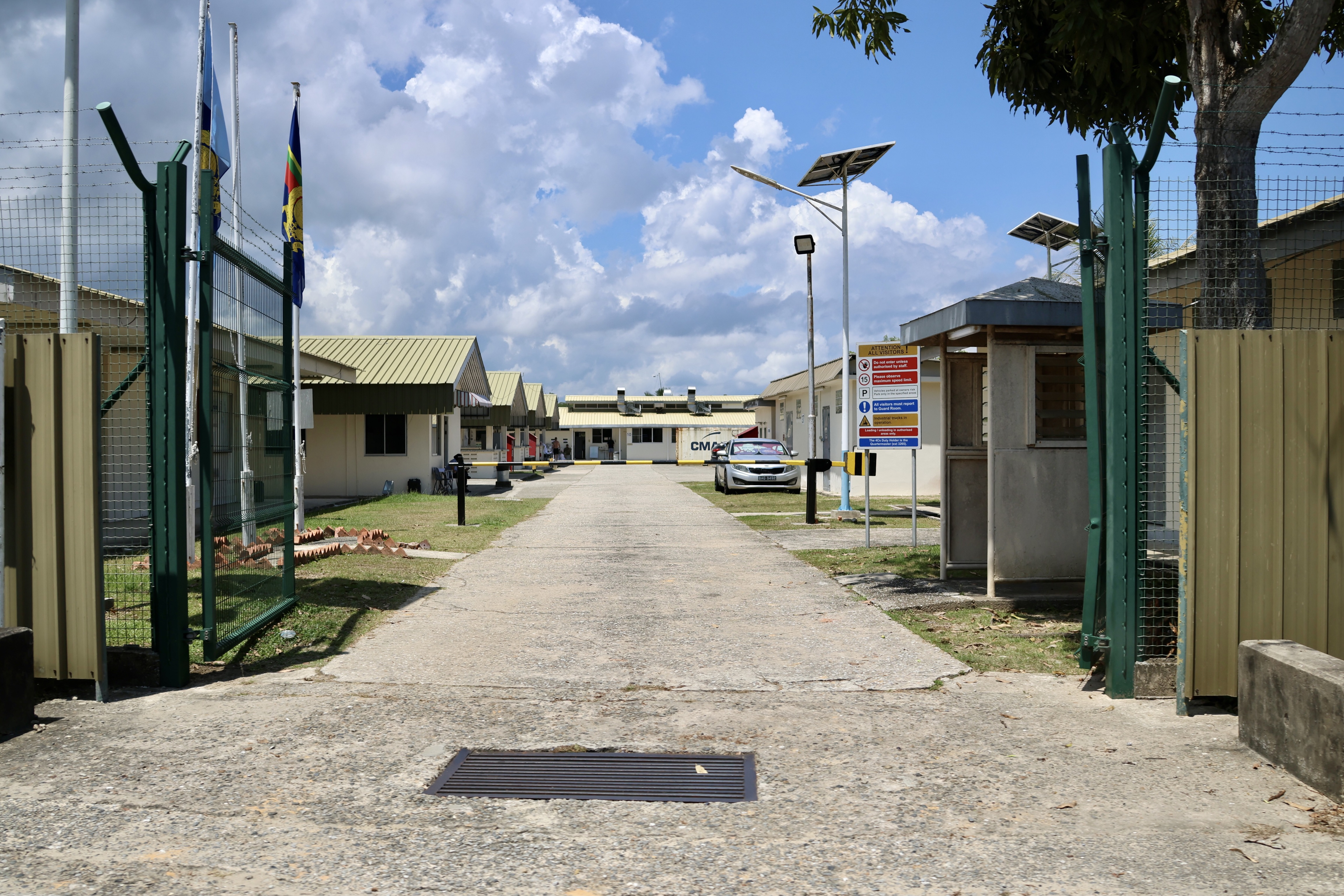
Sittang Camp in Tutong District, training location of the Jungle Warfare Training School, part of British Forces Brunei.

The British Army Jungle Warfare Training School (JWTS) of the Jungle Warfare Division (JWD) is an overseas military training establishment of the British Army, tasked with providing operational training in hot, tropical, and jungle warfare environments. It is part of British Forces Brunei (BFB), and the JWTS is headquartered at Medicina Lines (approximately 75 minute car journey from Brunei International Airport), near the Bruneian town Seria within Mukim Seria, Belait District, in the sultanate of Brunei Darussalam; whilst its actual training facility is located at Sittang Camp in the Tutong District.

The courses run by JWD which train the British Army and Royal Marines are:

- Operational Tracking Instructors Course (OTIC)
- Jungle Warfare Instructors Course (JWIC)

The original Jungle Warfare School was at Kota Tinggi, Johor, in Malaya. This operated from 1948; 78 years ago, to 1971; 55 years ago; it originally trained British and Commonwealth troops, and latterly Asian forces.

== See also ==
- Royal Gurkha Rifles
- No. 230 Squadron RAF
- No. 1563 Flight RAF
- No. 7 Flight AAC
- No. 667 Squadron AAC
