= No. 665 Squadron AAC =

No. 665 Squadron AAC 665 Aviation Squadron No. 665 Squadron RCAF
- Active: 22 Jan - 10 July 1945 (RCAF); 1 Oct 1969 - 1 Apr 1978; 12 Mar 1986 - present
- Country: United Kingdom
- Branch: British Army
- Type: Aviation
- Part of: 5 Regiment Army Air Corps
- Garrison/HQ: Middle Wallop Flying Station

No. 665 Squadron AAC is a squadron of the British Army's Army Air Corps. It was formerly No. 665 Squadron, a Royal Canadian Air Force air observation post squadron that was operational during the Second World War between 22 January and 10 July 1945.

== History ==
=== Royal Canadian Air Force ===
The Royal Canadian Air Force squadron was active 22 January and 10 July 1945, it was formed at RAF Andover, moving to Oatland Hill on 17 March, Glize-Rijen on 21 April, Borne on 27 May and finally Apeldoorn on 7 June 1945, where it was disbanded. The squadron operated the Taylorcraft Auster Mk. V.

=== Army Air Corps ===
No. 665 Squadron AAC was reformed as 665 Aviation Squadron at McMunn Barracks, Colchester Garrison on 1 October 1969 from 19 Brigade Flight, 1 Royal Horse Artillery AOP Troop and 1 POW Air Platoon operating Westland Scout AH.1s and Westland Gazelle AH.1s. It was renamed to No. 665 Squadron on 1 January 1973 when 3 Division Aviation was renamed to 3 Regiment Army Air Corps.

On 1 April 1978 the squadron was disbanded to become No. 657 Squadron AAC, but was reformed on 12 March 1986 at RAF Aldergrove as part of the Northern Ireland Regiment AAC, operating Gazelle AH.1s and Westland Lynx AH.1s. During 1991 the Lynx AH.1s departed, NI Regt AAC was renamed to 5 Regiment AAC on 1 December 1993.

The squadron was formerly based at Aldergrove Flying Station, operating the Gazelle AH.1 in a reconnaissance role, until October 2023 when the helicopter was retired from service.

The squadron is now based at Middle Wallop Flying Station, which is also home of the Army Aviation Centre, and Headquarters, Army Air Corps.

== See also ==
- List of Army Air Corps aircraft units (United Kingdom)
- List of Royal Air Force aircraft squadrons
