= No. 1563 Flight RAF =

Unit of the Royal Air Force in Brunei

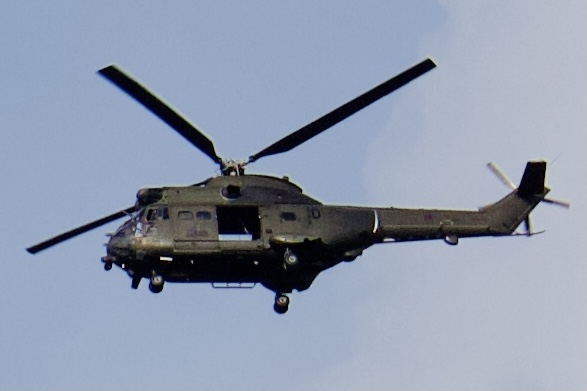
- Puma HC2 of No. 1563 Flight over Jerudong, Brunei in October 2022
- Active: 1 – 18 March 1941; 18 January – 4 April 1942; 1 Nov 1953 – 1 Oct 1958; 1 Mar 1963 – 8 Sep 1967; 18 Apr 1980 – 6 Jul 1993; 2022 – May 2023
- Country: United Kingdom
- Branch: (United Kingdom) Royal Air Force
- Type: Independent flight
- Role: Helicopter medium-lift support
- Part of: Joint Helicopter Command
- Aircraft: Westland Puma HC2

No. 1563 Flight Royal Air Force (1563 Flt) was an independent flight of the Royal Air Force (RAF). The flight formerly operated the Westland Puma HC2 helicopters in Brunei Darussalam. It previously flew tactical support missions for locally garrisoned British Army units, as well as Belize Defence Force units in Belize. Between 1963 and 1972, it was stationed at RAF Akrotiri flying Westland Whirlwind HAR.10 helicopters on support missions for locally garrisoned British Army and United Nations troops.

== No. 1563 (Meteorological) Flight RAF ==
No. 1563 (Meteorological) Flight RAF was formed in North Africa around December 1942, operating a variety of fixed-wing aircraft on meteorological observation duties, disbanding in May 1946.

== No. 1563 (Helicopter) Flight RAF ==
No. 1563 (Helicopter) Flight RAF was formed at RAF Akrotiri from elements of No. 103 Squadron RAF (103 Sqn) in 1963, flying Bristol Sycamore HAR.14 helicopters, initially, later flying Westland Whirlwind HAR.10s. 1563 (Helicopter) Flt amalgamated with elements of No. 230 Squadron RAF (230 Sqn) on 19 January 1972, to become No. 84 Squadron RAF (84 Sqn), which, as of 2023, is still resident at RAF Akrotiri.

== No. 1563 (Tactical Support) Flight ==
=== British Forces Belize ===
In 1975, with Guatemala in the grip of a bloody civil war, there was a real fear that Guatemalan forces might invade Belize, and at the very least widen their Caribbean coastline. To support the resident British Army garrison, a detachment of four Westland Puma HC.1 helicopters from No. 230 Squadron was sent to Belize international airport at Ladyville in November 1975. There they set about supporting the British Army role of deterring aggression from neighbours of Belize and supporting the jungle training task, as well as providing much needed search and rescue cover for the military and civilian population.

Aircraft and crews proceeded to be deployed from No. 33 Squadron at RAF Odiham and No. 230 Squadron, generally with a ratio of 3:1 with three of the four aircraft, (needs checking), and crews being provided by No. 33 Squadron and the fourth crew from No. 230 Squadron due to their operational / training tempo in the European theatre. Thus, under normal manning, there would be three pilots and three crewmen from No. 33 Squadron and a pilot and crewman from No. 230 Squadron.

Puma helicopters of 1563 Flt were instrumental in securing diplomatic assurances for the future of Belize, after supporting Harrier aircraft of No. 1417 Flight taking part in air shows at La Aurora International Airport, Guatemala City, for the 69th and 70th anniversaries of the Guatemalan Air Force, in 1990 and 1991.

=== Iraq ===
To support the Black Watch battle group, (part of UK 4 Armoured Brigade), in eastern Iraq, 1563 (Tactical Support) Flt was re-formed at Basrah International Airport. Flying Puma HC.1 helicopters, the flight was stood up in 2004, and disbanded again in October 2009.

=== Brunei ===
The flight was re-formed in 2022 to support British Army Jungle Warfare Training School and the Gurkha battalion in Brunei Darussalam.

In May 2023, 1563 Flight was disestablished, being replaced by the reforming No. 230 Squadron.

No. 606 Squadron RAF was deployed to assist the move from temporary home base in Royal Brunei Air Force Base, Rimba. On 1 June 2023, the flight successfully moved into their permanent home base in Medicina Lines. A year later, Pumas from No. 230 Squadron RAF took the place of 1563 Flight.

No. 1563 Flight Royal Air Force
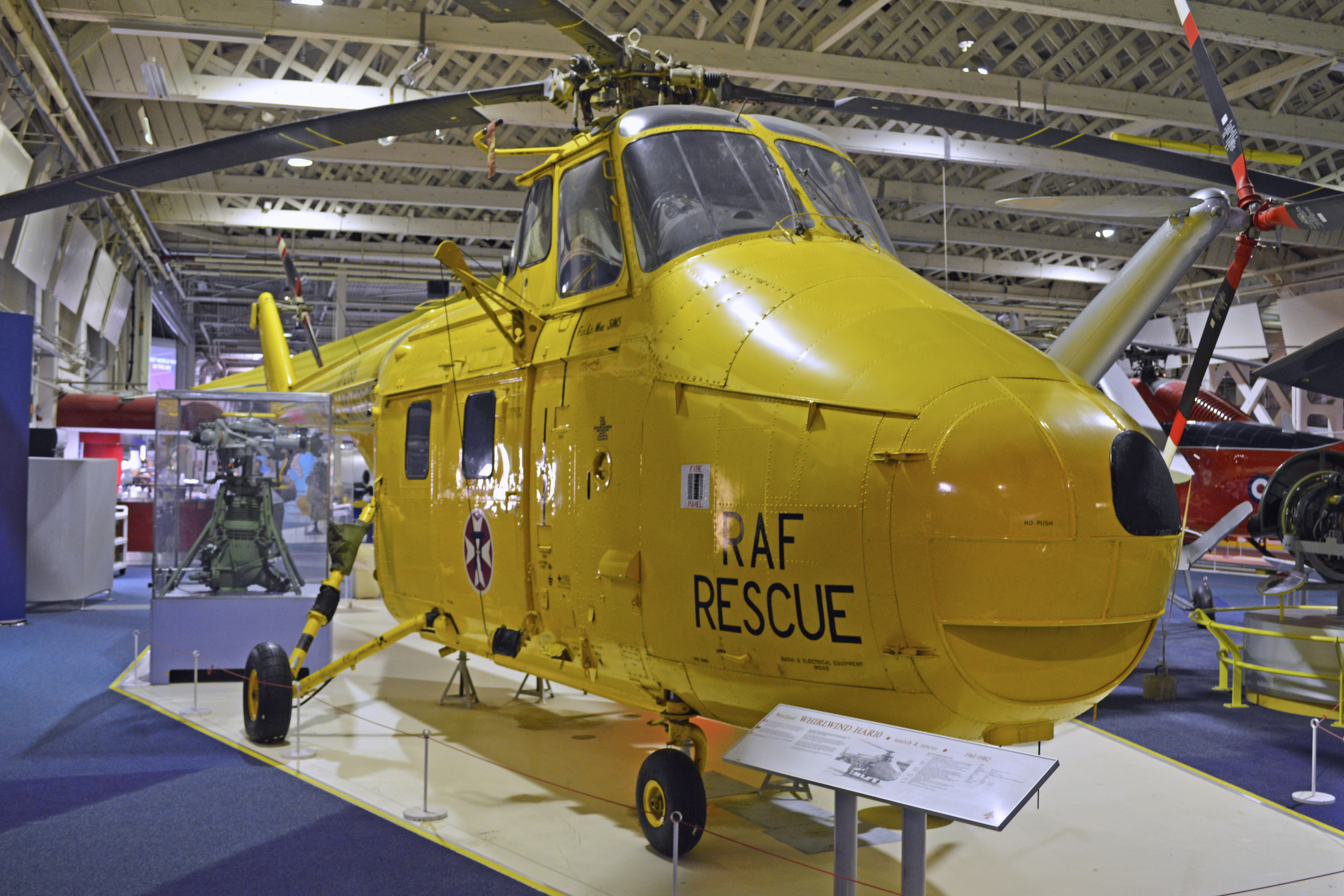
Westland Whirlwind HAR.10 XP299 which was operated by 1563 Flt at RAF Akrotiri from June 1969 to April 1970.

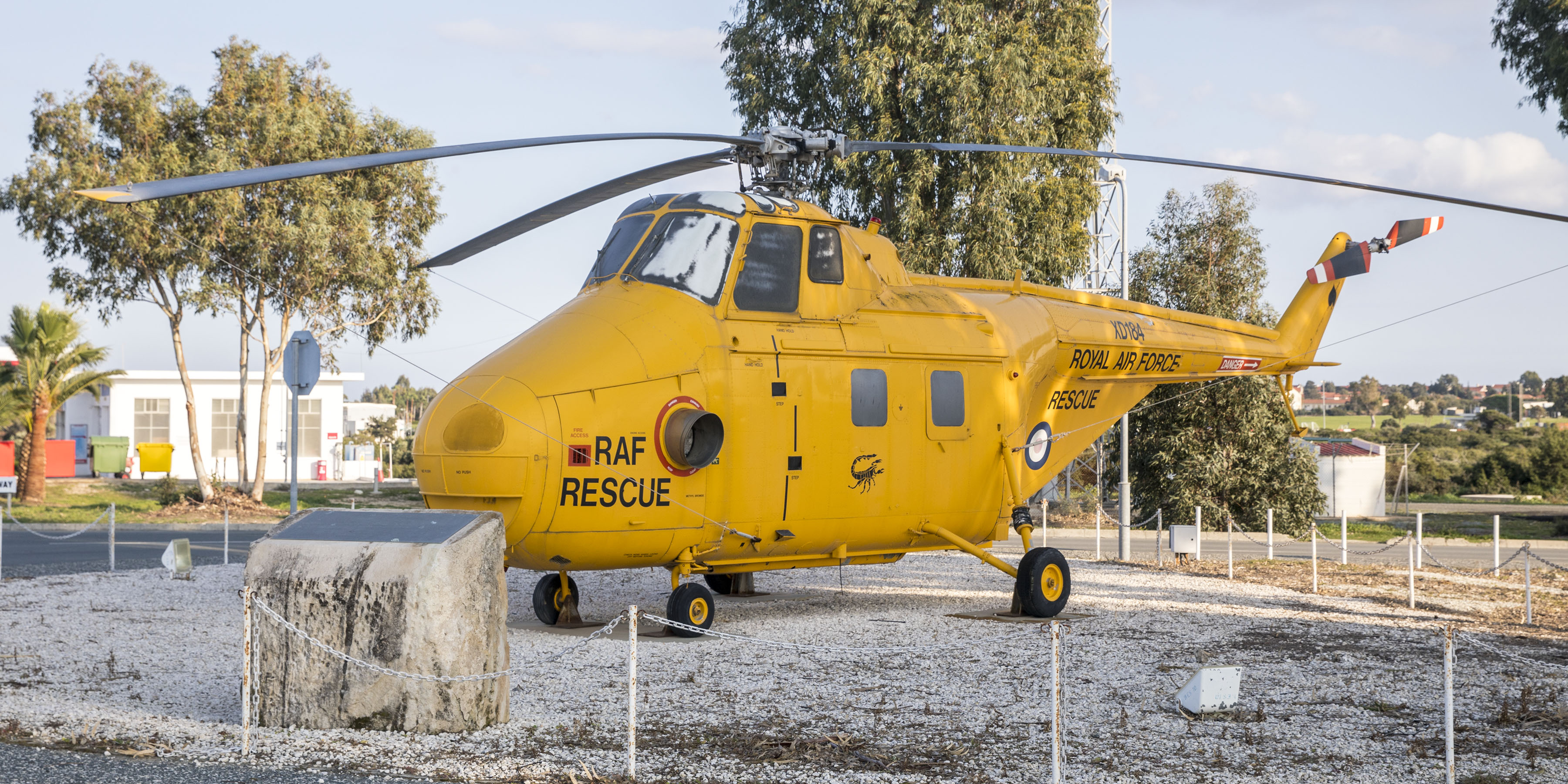
Whirlwind helicopter (XD184), previously of 1563 Flt and No. 84 Squadron, at RAF Akrotiri, Cyprus.

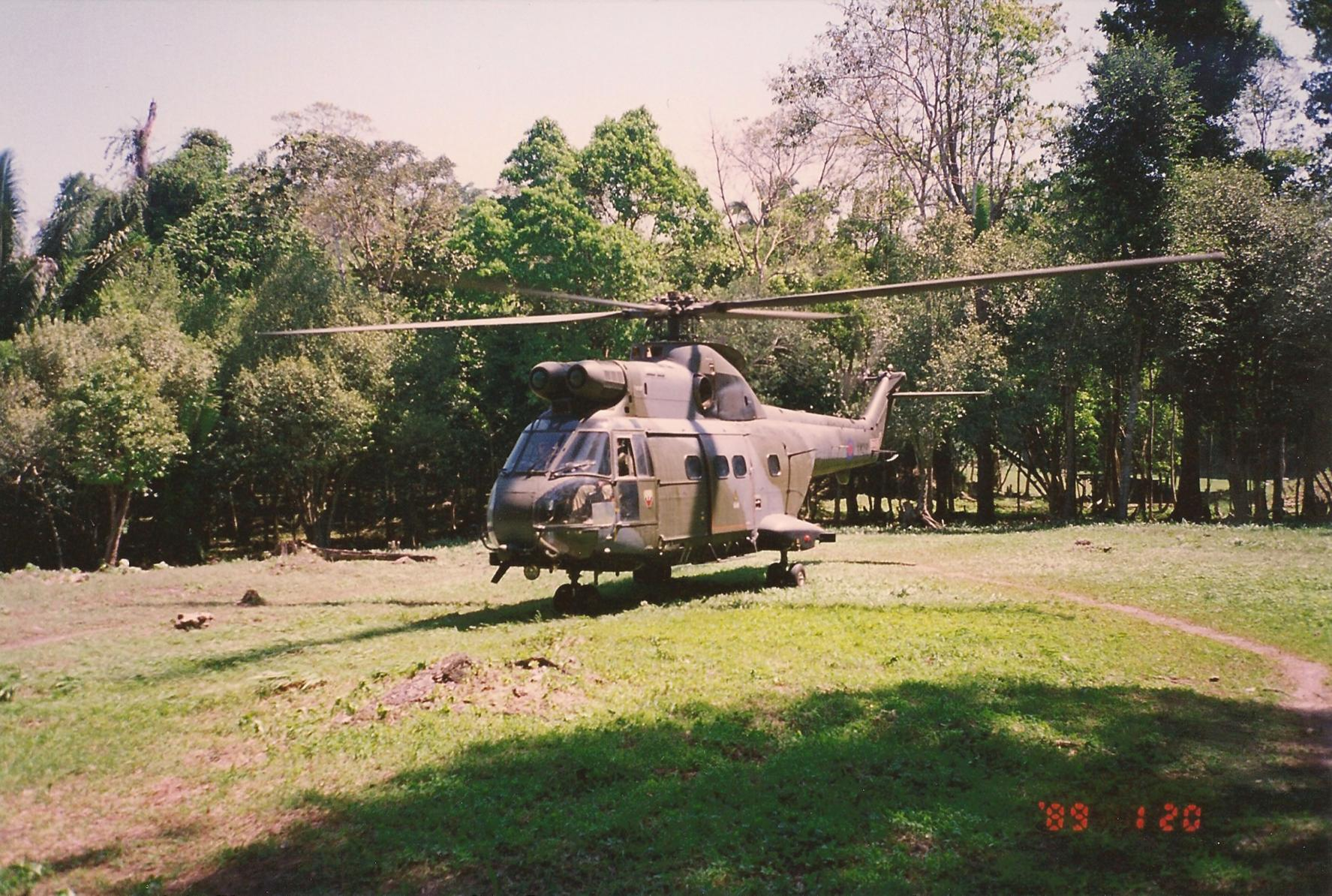
A Puma helicopter of 1563 Flt at Xunantunich.

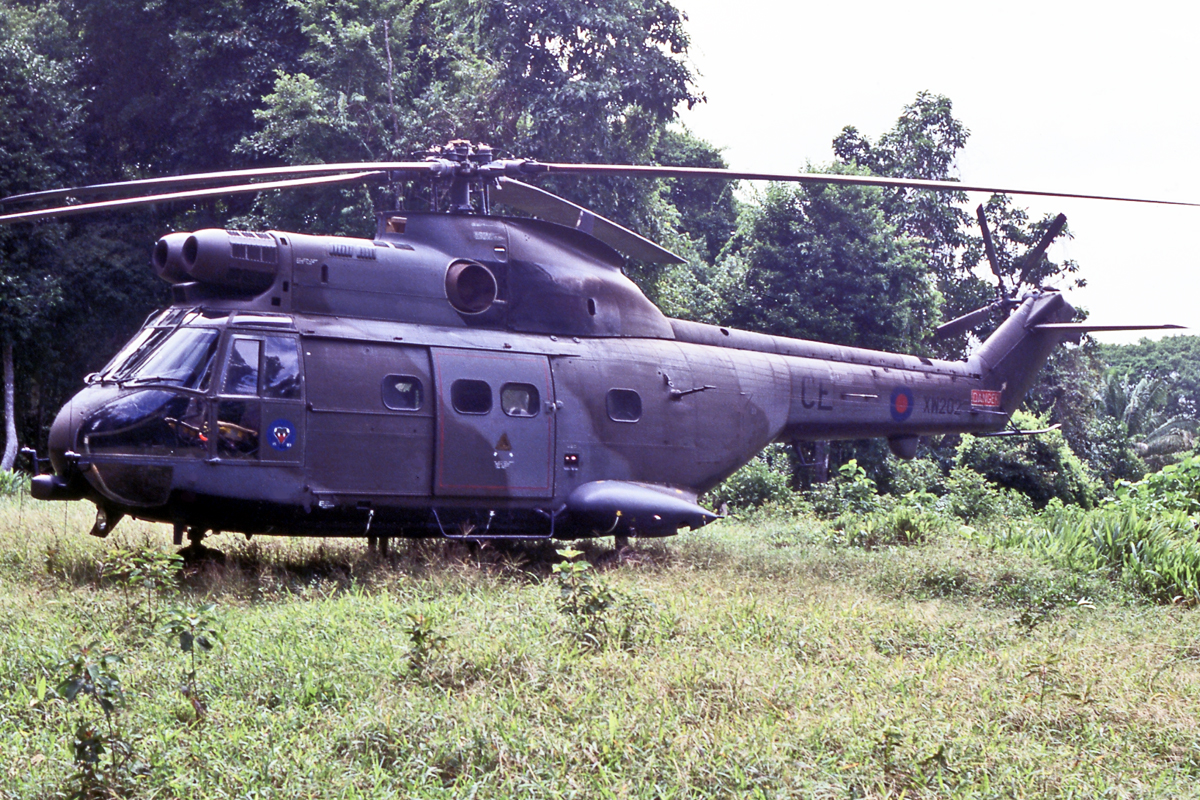
XW202 (CE), a Puma HC.1 of 1563 Flt in the Belizean Jungle, 14 August 1991.

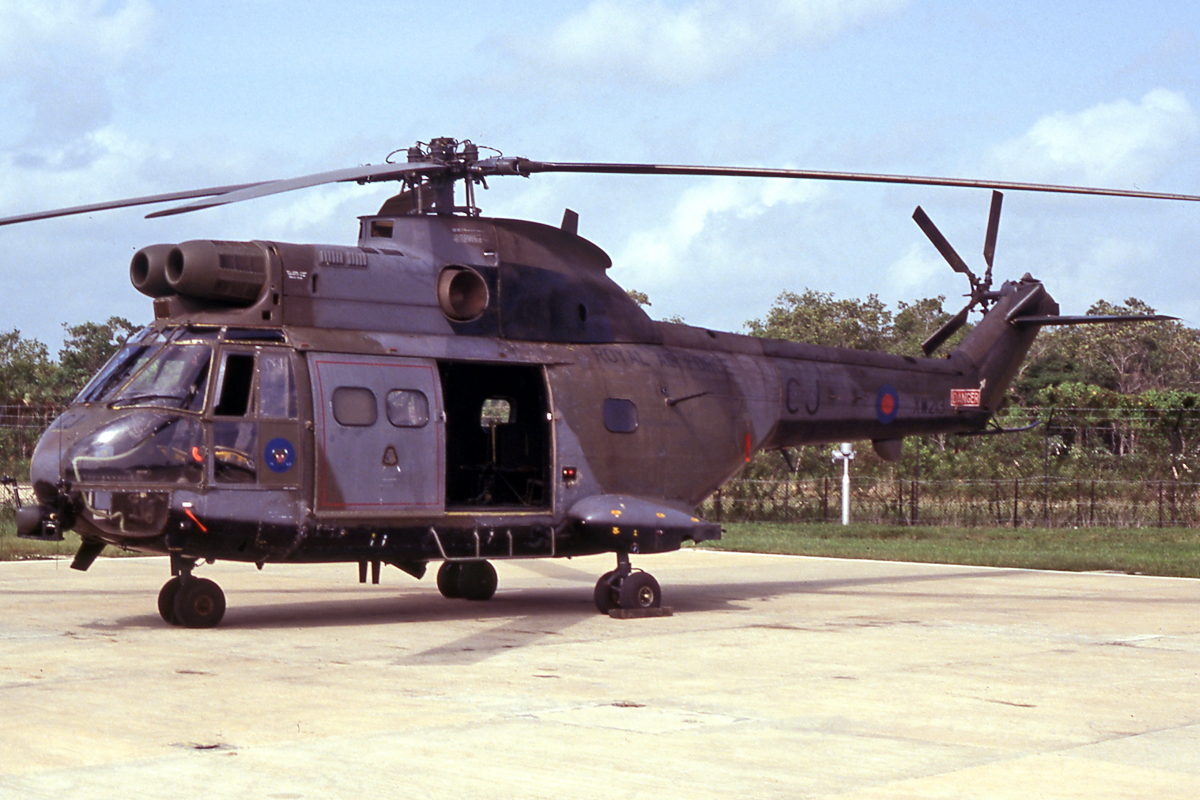
XW213 (CJ), a Puma HC1 of No. 1563 Flight on the helicopter operating platform at Williamson Hangar, Philip S.W. Goldson International Airport on 13 August 1991.

== See also ==
- List of Royal Air Force aircraft squadrons
- List of RAF Regiment units
- List of Fleet Air Arm aircraft squadrons
- List of Army Air Corps aircraft units
- List of RAF Squadron Codes
