= No. 652 Squadron AAC =

Flying squadron of the British Army's Army Air Corps

No. 652 (Wildcat Fielding) Squadron AAC No. 652 Squadron RAF
- Active: 1 May 1942 – 1 September 1957 (RAF); 1 September 1957 – present
- Country: United Kingdom
- Branch: (United Kingdom) British Army
- Part of: 1 Regiment Army Air Corps
- Garrison/HQ: RNAS Yeovilton

Aircraft flown
- Helicopter: AgustaWestland Wildcat AH.1

No. 652 Squadron AAC is a squadron of the British Army's Army Air Corps (AAC). It was previously No. 652 Squadron RAF, a unit of the Royal Air Force during the Second World War and afterwards in Germany.

Numbers 651 to 663 Squadrons of the RAF were air observation post units working closely with British Army units in artillery spotting and liaison. A further three of these squadrons, 664, 665 and 666, were AOP units of the Royal Canadian Air Force manned by Canadian and British personnel. Their duties and squadron numbers were transferred to the Army with the formation of the Army Air Corps on 1 September 1957.

== History ==
=== Royal Air Force ===
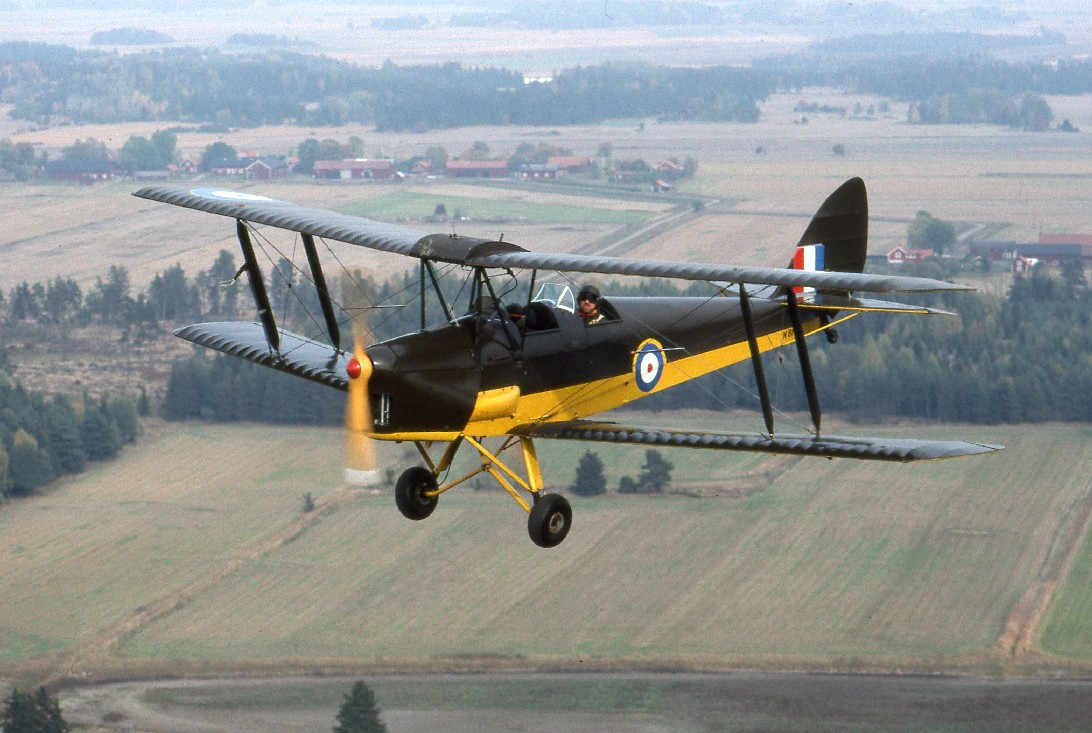
A postwar restored DH-82A Tiger Moth

No. 652 Squadron was formed at RAF Old Sarum, Wiltshire, on 1 May 1942 and went into action in Normandy on 7 June 1944 in support of the British Second Army and the Operation Overlord landings. Most of its pilots and observers came from the British Army, while maintenance was carried out by RAF personnel. The squadron moved with the Second Army through France, Belgium and the Netherlands into Germany.

The squadron's motto was Latin: Sive aere sive campo
(Translation: "In the air and in the field"), for an identification symbol it had "In front of wings conjoined in base, a gun barrel fesswise" and for an identification symbol it used XM (Sep 1946–1951)

Claim to fame

'C' Flight, No. 652 Squadron RAF has been credited with firing the last British shots of the war in Europe while directing artillery fire at the siege of Dunkirk on 7 May 1945, sharing in this action with No. 665 Squadron RCAF.

Post war service

After the German surrender it remained as part of the British Air Forces of Occupation, later of the 2nd Tactical Air Force.

The following flights operated in conjunction with the squadron: No. 1902 Air Observation Post Flight was formed within 652 Squadron previously 'A' Flight No. 1903 Air Observation Post Flight which was formed within 652 Squadron previously 'B' Flight No. 1904 Air Observation Post Flight was formed within 652 Squadron previously 'C' Flight No. 1905 Air Observation Post Flight was formed within 652 Squadron

The unit was disbanded in September 1957, when it was merged into the Army Air Corps.

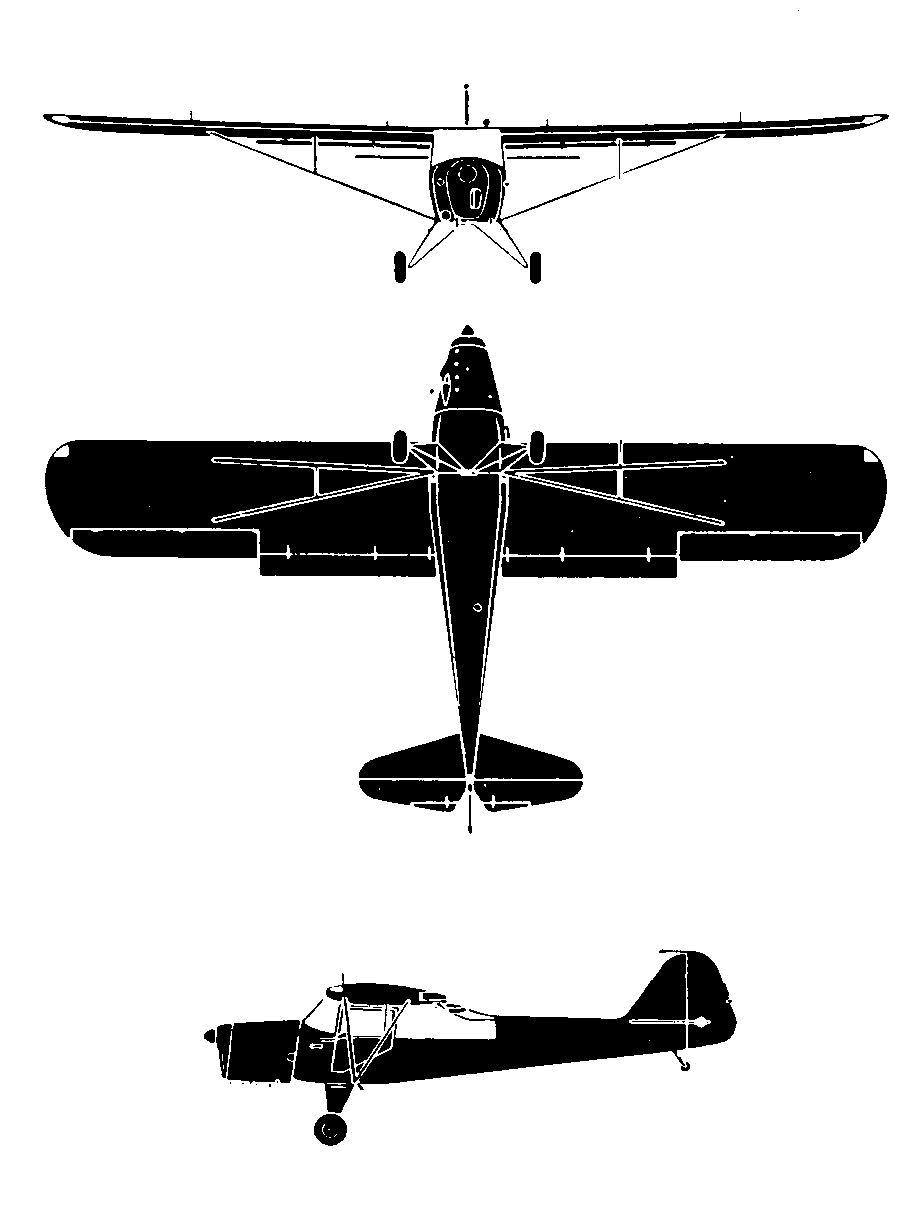
Auster AOP.6 silhouette

Aircraft operated by No. 652 Squadron RAF
From	To	Aircraft	Variant
May 1942	November 1942	de Havilland Tiger Moth	Mk.II
August 1942	March 1943	Taylorcraft Plus	C.2
October 1942	March 1943	Auster	Mk.I
March 1943	March 1944	Auster	Mk.III
February 1944	August 1946	Auster	Mk.IV
December 1944	December 1953	Auster	Mk.V
September 1946	September 1957	Auster	AOP.6
January 1956	September 1957	Auster	AOP.9

Bases and airfields used by No. 652 Squadron RAF, data from
From	To	Base	Remark
1 May 1942	15 June 1942	RAF Old Sarum, Wiltshire	
15 June 1942	11 August 1942	RAF Bottisham, Cambridgeshire	
11 August 1942	31 December 1942	RAF Westley, Suffolk	
31 December 1942	20 February 1943	RAF Dumfries, Dumfriesshire, Scotland	
20 February 1943	28 March 1943	RAF Sawbridgeworth, Hertfordshire	
28 March 1943	2 July 1943	RAF Methven, Perth and Kinross, Scotland	
2 July 1943	7 November 1943	RAF Ayr, Ayrshire, Scotland	
7 November 1943	25 March 1944	RAF Ipswich, Suffolk	
25 March 1944	29 April 1944	RAF Denham, Buckinghamshire	
29 April 1944	7 June 1944	RAF Cobham, Surrey	
6 June 1944	7 June 1944	Bény-sur-Mer, Calvados, France	Advance Party
7 June 1944	8 July 1944	Plumetot, Calvados, France	
8 July 1944	1 August 1944	Reviers, Calvados, France	
1 August 1944	13 August 1944	Blainville-sur-Orne, Calvados, France	
13 August 1944	17 August 1944	Grentheville, Calvados, France	
17 August 1944	23 August 1944	St-Pierre-sur-Dives, Calvados, France	
23 August 1944	26 August 1944	Lisieux, Calvados, France	
26 August 1944	3 September 1944	49 13'N 00 29'E, Calvados, France	
3 September 1944	4 September 1944	Foucart, Seine-Maritime, France	
4 September 1944	14 September 1944	Angerville-l'Orcher, Seine-Maritime, France	
14 September 1944	17 September 1944	Héricourt-en-Caux, Seine-Maritime, France	
17 September 1944	23 September 1944	Parfondeval, Seine-Maritime, France	
23 September 1944	27 September 1944	Buken, Flemish Brabant, Belgium	
27 September 1944	5 October 1944	Zoersel, Antwerp, Belgium	
5 October 1944	13 October 1944	Het Geheul, Antwerp, Belgium	
13 October 1944	19 October 1944	Turnhout, Antwerp, Belgium	
19 October 1944	23 October 1944	51 17'N 04 39'E, Antwerp, Belgium	
23 October 1944	1 November 1944	Maria ter Heide, Antwerp, Belgium	
1 November 1944	4 November 1944	Brasschaat, Antwerp, Belgium	
4 November 1944	10 November 1944	Roosendaal, North Brabant, Netherlands	
10 November 1944	31 December 1944	Brasschaat, Antwerp, Belgium	
31 December 1944	1 April 1945	Tilburg, North Brabant, Netherlands	
1 April 1945	3 April 1945	Kleve, Westphalia, Allied-occupied Germany	
3 April 1945	30 April 1945	Zutphen, Gelderland, Netherlands	
1 May 1945	14 June 1945	Rhede, Westphalia, Allied-occupied Germany	
14 June 1945	16 November 1945	Deilinghofen, Westphalia, Allied-occupied Germany	
16 November 1945	29 April 1946	RAF Hoya, Province of Hanover, British Zone of Occupation	
29 April 1946	1 December 1947	B.118/RAF Celle, Lower Saxony, British Zone of Occupation	Nos. 1902, 1903 & 1904 Flts.
1 December 1947	1 May 1949	B.156/RAF Luneburg, Lower Saxony, British Zone of Occupation	Nos. 1902, 1903, 1904 & 1905 Flts.
1 May 1949	1 September 1957	RAF Detmold, North Rhine-Westphalia, West Germany	Nos. 1901, 1904, 1905 & 1909 Flts.

=== Army Air Corps ===
The squadron was transferred to the Army on 1 September 1957 while the unit was in Germany. Between 1966 and October 1969 the unit was employed as 1 Division Army Aviation HQ.

During the Cold War, the squadron was part of No. 2 Regiment AAC (along with 662 Sqn), the two squadrons were at different locations, 662 Sqn was at Münster, and 652 was at Bünde. About 1984, as a result of changing the structure of AAC Regiments, 2 Regiment was disbanded and 652 Sqn became part of 1 Regiment AAC at Hildesheim, Germany – each regiment now consisting of three squadrons and a HQ Troop. Sometime after 1990, 1 Regiment moved to Gutersloh, Germany.

Deployments

- Between September 1984 and February 1985, the unit deployed to the Falkland Islands being split between Goose Green and Port Stanley.
- Between September 2004 and October 2007, the unit deployed two times to Iraq (Operation Telic) with Westland Lynx's.
- Between September 2009 and January 2012, 652 Sqn deployed to Afghanistan (Operation Herrick) with Lynx AH.9's.
- Between January 1974 and May 1974 the Squadron was deployed to Northern Ireland (Operation Banner) operating six Westland Scouts from Long Kesh army base.
- Between November 1975 and March 1976 the Squadron was deployed to Northern Ireland (Operation Banner) operating six Westland Scouts from Longkesh army base.

== Present day ==
The unit converted to the AgustaWestland Wildcat AH.1 and moved to RNAS Yeovilton becoming the Wildcat Fielding Squadron, training aircrews.

== See also ==
- List of Army Air Corps aircraft units
- List of Royal Air Force aircraft squadrons
