= No. 654 Squadron AAC =

No. 654 Squadron AAC 654 Aviation Squadron 654 Light Aircraft Squadron No. 654 Squadron RAF
- Active: 15 July 1942 – 24 June 1947 (RAF); 1 September 1958 – July 2014
- Country: United Kingdom
- Branch: (United Kingdom) Army Air Corps
- Role: Regimental Headquarters
- Part of: 4 Regiment Army Air Corps

No. 654 Squadron AAC (654 Sqn) is a squadron of the British Army's Army Air Corps (AAC) that is currently the Headquarters Squadron for 4 Regt AAC. It was formerly No. 654 Squadron RAF, a unit of the Royal Air Force during the Second World War. Numbers 651 to 663 Squadrons of the RAF were air observation post units working closely with British Army units in artillery spotting and liaison. Their duties and squadron numbers were transferred to the Army with the formation of the Army Air Corps on 1 September 1957.

== History ==
=== Royal Air Force ===
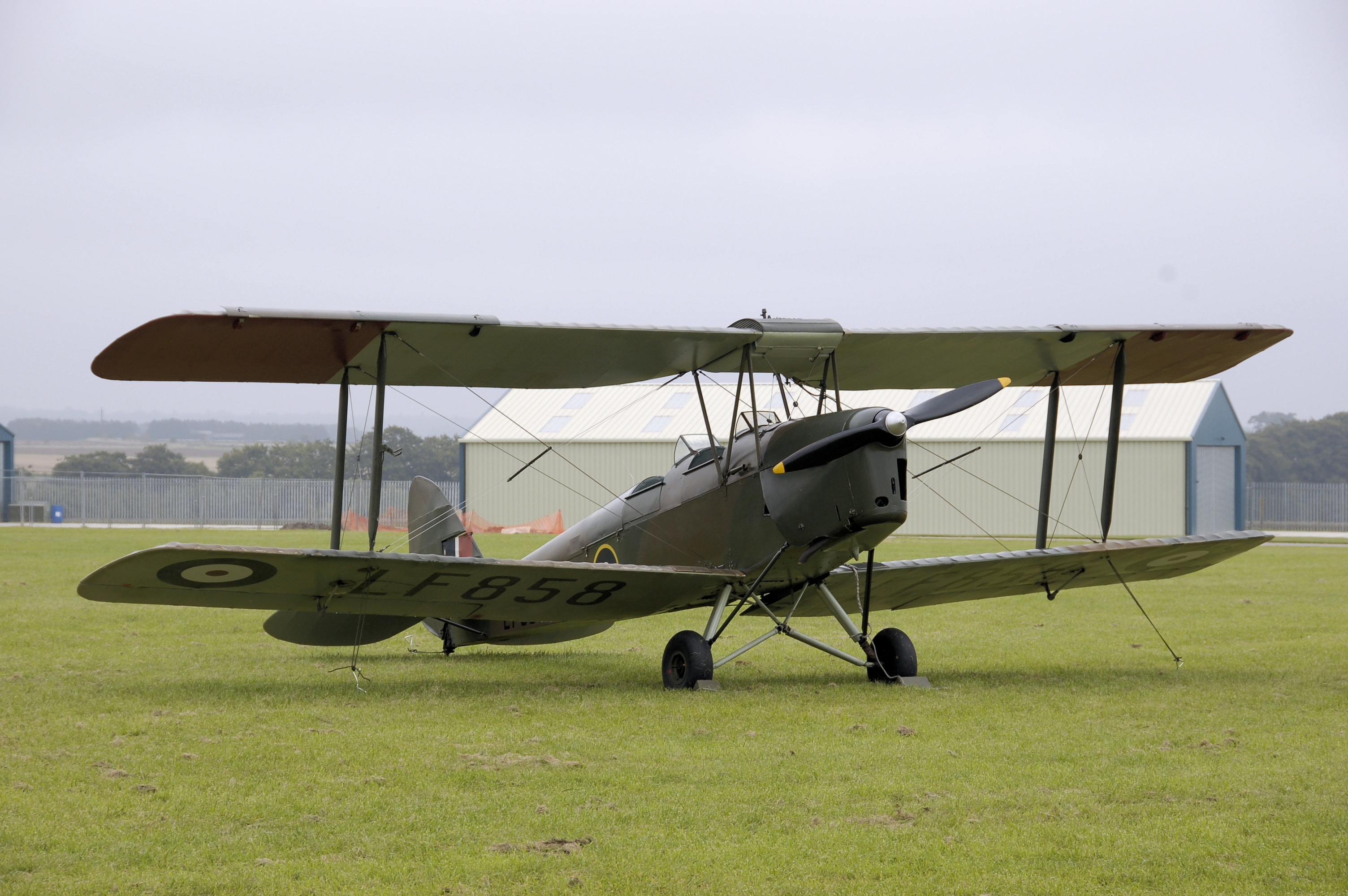
de Havilland DH-82b Tiger Moth.

No. 654 Squadron was formed at RAF Old Sarum, Wiltshire, on 15 July 1942 and went into action in August 1943 in North Africa. From December 1943, it served in Italy, where it remained until disbanding at Campoformido on 24 June 1947.

No. 1906 Air Observation Post Flight was formed within 654 Squadron previously elements of 'A' & 'B' Flights along with No. 1907 Air Observation Post Flight which was formed within 654 Squadron previously elements of 'A' & 'C' Flights.

The squadron had the motto Progressive, it used an identification symbol of A propeller and gun barrel in saltire It used identification symbols: QA (1944 – May 1945, HQ Flight) QB (1944 – May 1945, 'A' Flight)QC (1944 – May 1945, 'B' Flight) QD (1944 – May 1945, 'C' Flight)

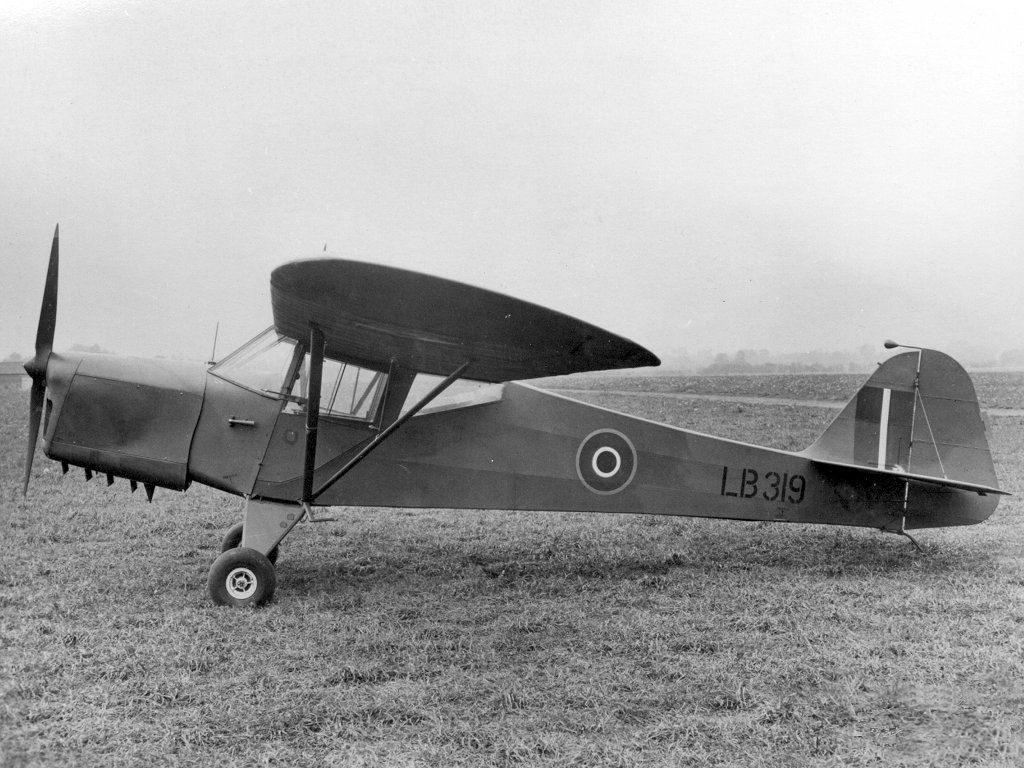
An Auster Mk.III

Aircraft operated by No. 654 Squadron RAF, data from
From	To	Aircraft	Variant
July 1942	September 1942	de Havilland Tiger Moth	Mk.II
September 1942	December 1942	Auster	Mk.I
December 1942	October 1944	Auster	Mk.III
June 1944	June 1947	Auster	Mk.IV
December 1944	June 1947	Auster	Mk.V

=== Army Air Corps ===
The squadron was formed on 1 September 1958 in Germany and employed as 2 Division Aviation HQ between 1964 and October 1969.

Between February and March 1991 the squadron was in Iraq as part of Operation Desert Sabre (the ground phase of Operation Granby) using Westland Lynx AH1GT's against armoured vehicles of the Iraqi 12th Armoured Division. They returned to Hobart Barracks on 22 March 1991 without any losses.

654 AAC disbanded in July 2014, as part of Army 2020.

At some point the squadron was reformed and became the Headquarters Squadron for 4 Regiment Army Air Corps.

Deployments

- Operation Herrick (Afghanistan):
  - September 2008 – January 2009
  - September 2010 – January 2011
  - January 2012 – May 2012
  - September 2013 – January 2014

Aircraft operated

The squadron operated a variety of helicopters:

- Saunders-Roe Skeeter AOP.12
- Westland Sioux AH.1
- Westland Lynx AH.1GT
- Westland Scout AH.1
- AgustaWestland Apache AH.1

== Locations ==
- Tofrek Barracks East, Hildesheim
- Harewood Barracks, Herford
- Hobart Barracks, Detmold

== See also ==
- List of Army Air Corps aircraft units (United Kingdom)
- List of Royal Air Force aircraft squadrons
