= No. 667 Squadron AAC =

No. 667 Squadron AAC No. 667 (Development and Trials) Squadron AAC No. 667 Squadron RAF
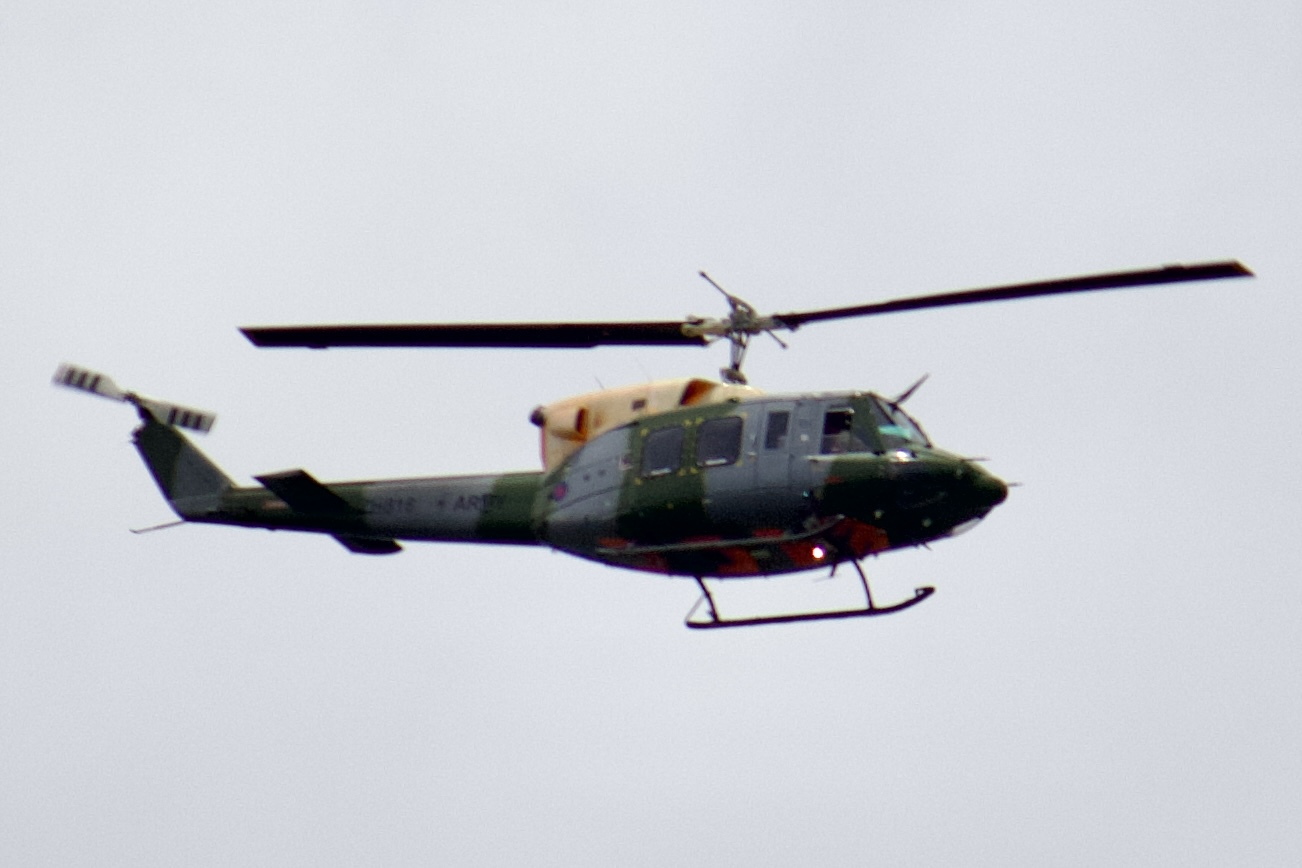
- Bell 212 AH1 of the No. 667 Squadron over Lumut, Brunei in 2022
- Active: 1 December 1943 – 20 December 1945 (RAF); 1989 – 2020; 1 August 2021 – 2022; 2025 - present
- Country: United Kingdom
- Branch: British Army
- Type: Flying squadron
- Role: Transport
- Part of: Army Air Corps
- Home station: Medicina Lines

Aircraft flown
- Utility helicopter: Airbus H145 Jupiter HC.2

667 Squadron AAC is a squadron of the British Army's Army Air Corps (AAC).

== History ==
No. 667 Squadron was first formed on 1 December 1943 at RAF Gosport, Hampshire from 1662 and 1631 Flight's and No. 7 Anti-Aircraft Practice Camp at RAF Shoreham, Kent for various anti-aircraft training duties. The squadron was initially equipped with Boulton Paul Defiants and undertook target towing duties with these. It later received Hurricanes, Barracudas, Oxfords, Vengeances and Spitfires, before disbanding at Gosport on 20 December 1945. Between December 1943 and December 1945 squadron aircraft wore the codes U4. During the Second World War the squadron formed part of No. 70 Group RAF, Air Defence of Great Britain from 1943 to 1944 and Fighter Command from 1944 to 1945.

From 1989 the squadron had a development and trials role as part of the Army Air Corps. The squadron continued in this role until late 2020 when it was disbanded.

During 2019 the squadron supported the deployment of the Apache aboard HMS Queen Elizabeth (R08).

On 1 August 2021, No. 7 Flight AAC based in Brunei was redesignated as No. 667 Squadron. In 2022 the Bell 212 was replaced in Brunei with the RAF Westland Puma HC2, operated by No. 1563 Flight RAF.

During December 2025 Airbus H145 Jupiter HC.2 helicopters were spotted operating from RAF Benson wearing Army titles and 667 Squadron crests.

== Aircraft operated ==
Aircraft operated by 667 Squadron, data from
| From | To | Aircraft | Version |
|---|---|---|---|
| December 1943 | January 1945 | Boulton Paul Defiant | Mks.I & III |
| April 1944 | August 1945 | Hawker Hurricane | Mks.I & IIc |
| May 1944 | June 1945 | Fairey Barracuda | Mk.II |
| June 1944 | December 1945 | Airspeed Oxford | Mks.I & II |
| October 1944 | December 1945 | Vultee Vengeance | Mk.IV |
| July 1945 | December 1945 | Supermarine Spitfire | LF.XVIe |
| | 2020 | Westland Gazelle | AH1 |
| | 2020 | Westland Lynx | AH7 |
| 2021 | 2022 | Bell 212 | AH1 AH3 |
| 2026 | present | Airbus H145 | Jupiter HC Mk2 |

== Squadron bases ==
Bases and airfields used by 667 Squadron, data from
| From | To | Base | Remark |
|---|---|---|---|
| 1 December 1943 | 20 December 1945 | RAF Gosport, Hampshire | Det. at RAF Shoreham, Kent |
| 1957 | 2020 | AAC Middle Wallop, Hampshire | |
| 2021 | 2022 | Medicina Lines in Seria, Brunei | |
| 2025 | present | Medicina Lines in Seria, Brunei | |
