= Radfan district =

Coordinates: 13°20′N 45°05′E

Radfan District
- District
- Interactive map of Radfan District
- Country: Yemen
- Governorate: Lahij Governorate

Population (2003)
  - Total: 45,570
- Time zone: UTC+3 (Yemen Standard Time)

Radfan District is a district of the Lahij Governorate, Yemen. As of 2003, the district had a population of 45,570 people.
