= No. 657 Squadron AAC =

No. 657 Squadron AAC No. 657 Squadron RAF
- Active: 31 January 1943 – 1 November 1955 (RAF); 1 January 1973 – May 2018
- Country: United Kingdom
- Branch: (United Kingdom) British Army
- Type: Aviation
- Size: Squadron
- Part of: Army Air Corps
- Mottos: Latin: Per terras perque caelum (Translation: "By land and sky")

No. 657 Squadron AAC was a squadron of the British Army's Army Air Corps (AAC), part of the Joint Special Forces Aviation Wing based at RAF Odiham. The squadron disbanded in May 2018 after the retirement of the Westland Lynx.

It was formerly No. 657 Squadron RAF, a unit of the Royal Air Force in North Africa, Italy and the Netherlands during the Second World War and afterwards in Germany. Numbers 651 to 663 Squadrons of the RAF were air observation post units working closely with British Army units in artillery spotting and liaison. Their duties and squadron numbers were transferred to the Army with the formation of the Army Air Corps on 1 September 1957.

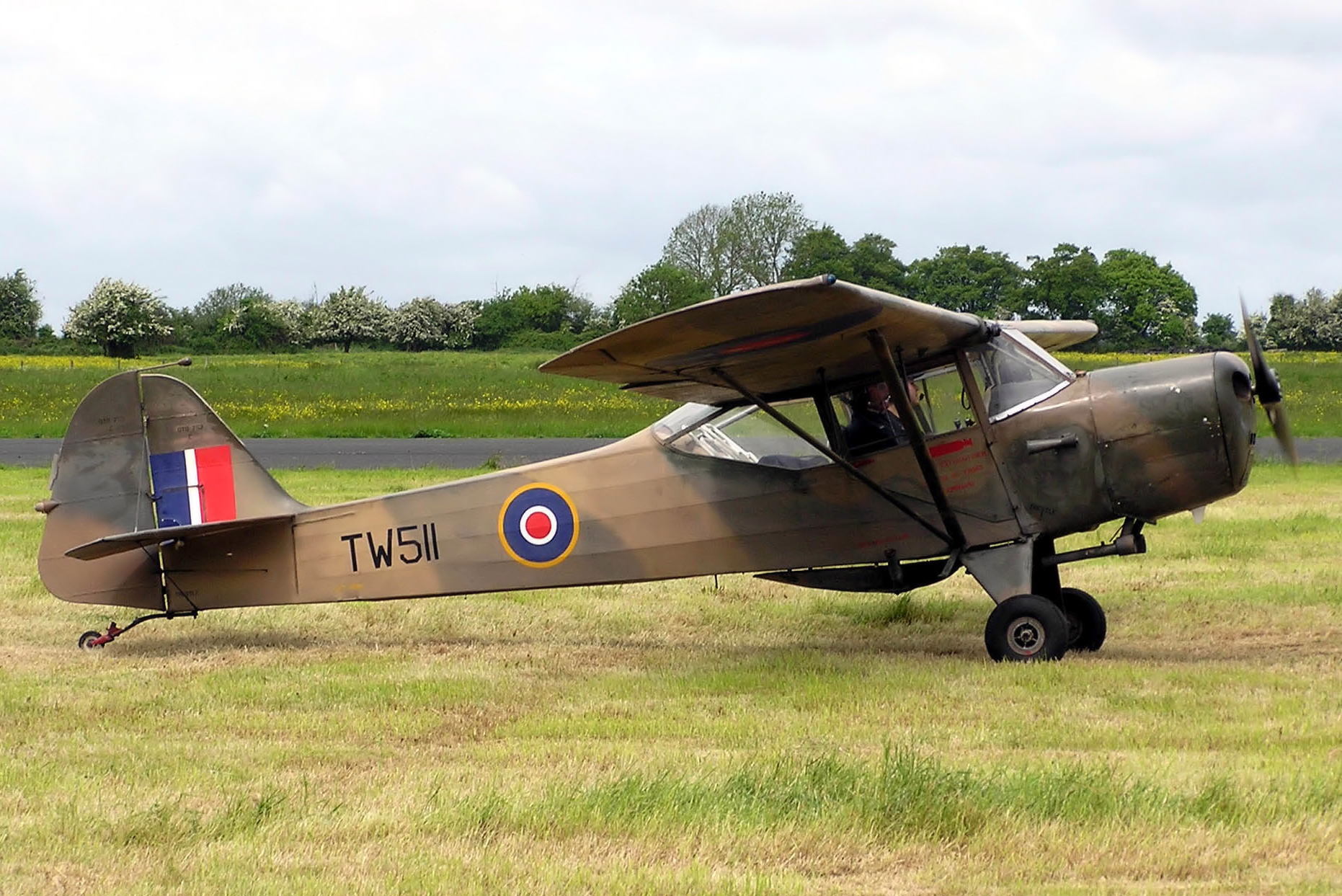
A postwar Auster Mk.V, restored in wartime colours.

== History ==
=== Royal Air Force ===
No. 657 Squadron was formed at RAF Ouston on 31 January 1943. It went into action in August of that year, in North Africa. It later served in Italy, the Netherlands and Germany. In November 1945, the squadron returned to the UK and continued to support army units in the South of England until disbanded by being renumbered No. 651 Squadron RAF on 1 November 1955.

No. 1900 Independent Air Observation Post Flight was formed within 657 Squadron previously 'A' & 'B' Flights along with No. 1901 Air Observation Post Flight which was formed within 657 previously 'C' Flight.

The squadron's motto was: Latin: Per terras perque caelum
(Translation: "By land and sky") and their identification symbol was a hand couped at the wrist, holding a gun barrel. Its identification symbols were VA 1944–45 (HQ Flight) VB 1944–45 ('A' Flight) VC 1944–45 ('B' Flight) VD 1944–45 ('C' Flight) TS (1945 – Jan 1947)

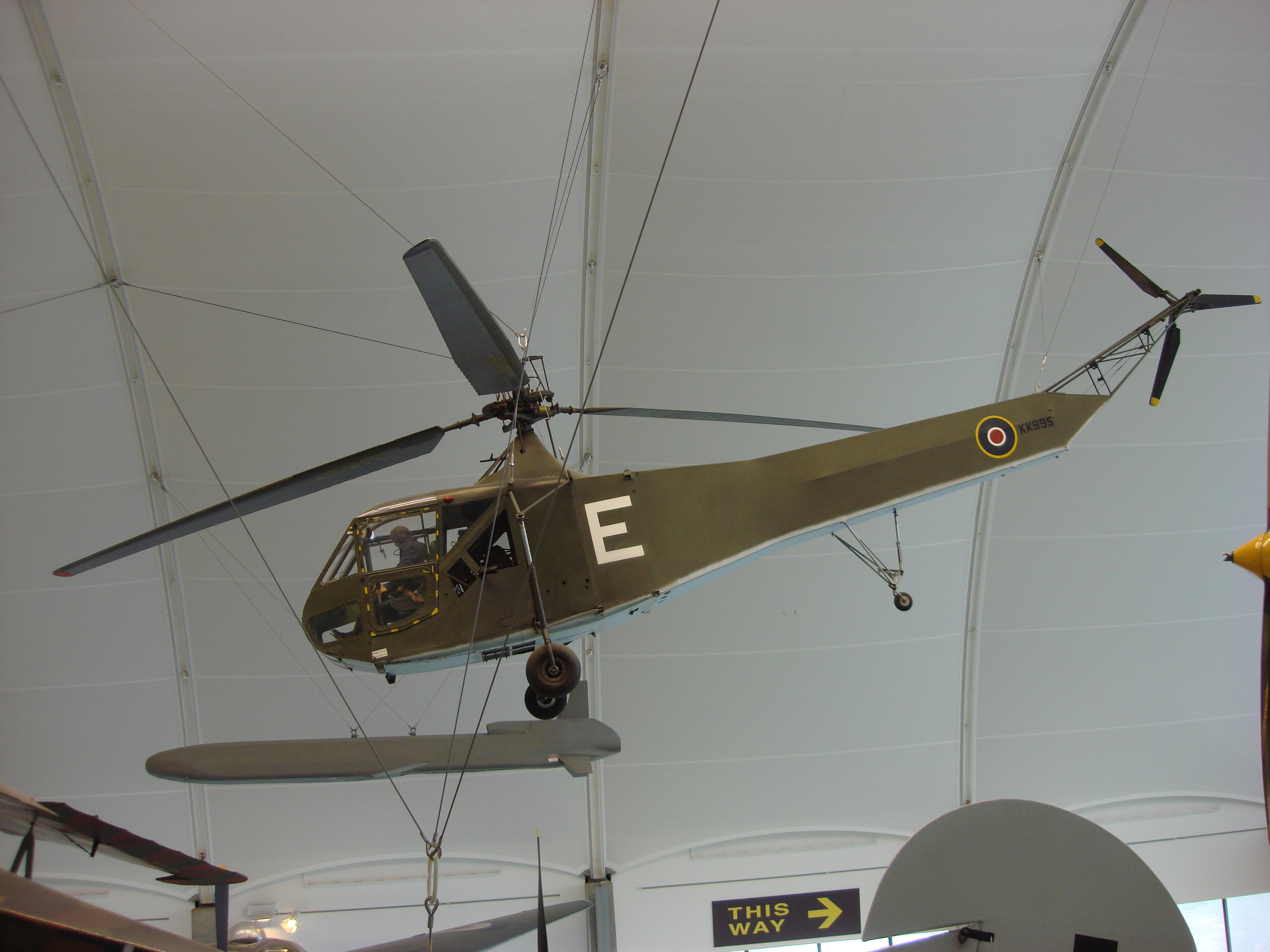
A Sikorsky R-4 Hoverfly at the Royal Air Force Museum London.

Aircraft operated by No. 657 Squadron RAF
From	To	Aircraft	Variant
Feb 1943	May 1943	Auster	Mk.I
May 1943	Oct 1944	Auster	Mk.III
Jun 1944	Mar 1945	Auster	Mk.IV
Dec 1944	Mar 1945	Auster	Mk.V
Apr 1945	Nov 1952	Auster	Mk.V
Mar 1946	Dec 1952	Auster	AOP.4
Jun 1946	Nov 1955	Auster	AOP.6
Apr 1947	Apr 1951	Sikorsky Hoverfly	Mk.II
Sep 1951	Nov 1955	Bristol Sycamore	HC.11

Bases and airfields used by No. 657 Squadron RAF

From	To	Base
31 Jan 1943	1 May 1943	RAF Ouston, Northumberland
1 May 1943	26 Jun 1943	RAF Westly
26 Jun 1943	15 Aug 1943	RAF Clifton
15 Aug 1943	24 Aug 1943	en route to North Africa
24 Aug 1943	22 Sep 1943	Algiers, Algeria
22 Sep 1943	16 Oct 1943	Bone, Algeria
16 Oct 1943	9 Jan 1944	Philippeville, Algeria
9 Jan 1944	16 Jan 1944	Châteaudun, Algeria
16 Jan 1944	28 Feb 1944	en route to Italy
28 Feb 1944	8 Apr 1944	Vasto, Italy
8 Apr 1944	11 May 1944	Presenzano, Italy
11 May 1944	5 Jun 1944	Campozilonne, Italy
5 Jun 1944	9 Jun 1944	Anagni, Italy
9 Jun 1944	23 Jun 1944	Civita Castellana, Italy
23 Jun 1944	29 Jun 1944	Città della Pieve, Italy
29 Jun 1944	4 Jul 1944	Ravigliano, Italy
4 Jul 1944	18 Jul 1944	Creti/Foiano, Italy
18 Jul 1944	19 Aug 1944	Carraia, Italy

From	To	Base
19 Aug 1944	1 Sep 1944	Iesi, Italy
1 Sep 1944	6 Oct 1944	Landing ground on south bank of river Foglia, Italy
6 Oct 1944	21 Oct 1944	Rimini, Italy
21 Oct 1944	4 Nov 1944	Savignano, Italy
4 Nov 1944	29 Nov 1944	Cesena, Italy
29 Nov 1944	15 Dec 1944	Cervia, Italy
15 Dec 1944	21 Mar 1945	San Pancrazio, Italy
21 Mar 1945	24 Mar 1945	Ravenna, Italy
24 Mar 1945	30 Mar 1945	Leghorn, Italy
30 Mar 1945	11 Apr 1945	Via Marseille, France, to The Netherlands
11 Apr 1945	16 Apr 1945	Gilze-Rijen, the Netherlands
16 Apr 1945	21 Apr 1945	Doetinchem, the Netherlands
21 Apr 1945	4 May 1945	Otterloo, the Netherlands
4 May 1945	16 May 1945	Teuge. the Netherlands
16 May 1945	20 Jun 1945	Hilversum, the Netherlands
20 Jun 1945	16 Nov 1945	Goslar, British Zone of Occupation
16 Nov 1945	26 Jan 1946	Wiltshire
26 Jan 1946	19 Jan 1948	RAF Andover, Hampshire
19 Jan 1948	1 Nov 1955	RAF Middle Wallop, Hampshire

=== Army Air Corps ===
No. 657 Squadron traces its lineage to the Royal Air Force No. 657 Squadron formed in January 1943 and disbanded in November 1955.

No. 657 Squadron AAC was formed on 1 January 1973 as part of 1 Regiment AAC. The squadron served in Northern Ireland, based at Shackleton Barracks. In 1976–77 the squadron was based at Soltau, West Germany, attached to the 7th Armoured Brigade; later the squadron relocated to Hildesheim, West Germany. On 1 March 1978, No. 665 Squadron AAC was re-designated as 657 Squadron, based at Kirkee Barracks in Colchester. In July 1990, the squadron relinquished its independent status by becoming part of 9 Regiment AAC and moved to Oakington in Cambridgeshire and then in February 1991 to Dishforth Airfield in North Yorkshire.

In June 2000, the squadron once again became independent when it moved to RAF Odiham in Hampshire. In September 2000, two Westland Lynx helicopters took part in Operation Barras in Sierra Leone. In April 2001, the squadron became part of the newly formed Joint Special Forces Aviation Wing.

==== Afghanistan incident ====
On 26 April 2014, a Lynx crashed in Takhta Pul district of Kandahar Province, killing all five British personnel on board. They were Captain Thomas Clarke, Warrant Officer 2 Spencer Faulkner and Corporal James Walters of the Army Air Corps, Flight Lieutenant Rakesh Chauhan of the Royal Air Force and Lance Corporal Oliver Thomas of the Intelligence Corps. As at 28 April 2014, the cause was described as an accident, despite Taliban claims that they had caused the crash. The Telegraph described it as a "routine training mission". The site, variously described as "close to Kandahar base" and "30 miles from the Pakistani border", was secured for recovery of the bodies and aircraft. A full report into the accident was published in July 2015, by the Ministry of Defence and the Military Aviation Authority.

== Disbandment ==
With the Lynx reaching the end of its operational life in January 2018, the squadron disbanded in May 2018.

Plans to purchase modified AgustaWestland Wildcat helicopters to replace the Lynx in the special forces role were dropped due to budget constraints. The squadron's special forces role has therefore been taken over by a flight of special forces-trained personnel within the existing Wildcat fleet.

== See also ==
- List of Army Air Corps aircraft units
