= 5 Regiment Army Air Corps =

- Active: 1 October 1993 – present
- Country: United Kingdom
- Branch: British Army
- Type: Aviation
- Size: Regiment
- Part of: Joint Aviation Command
- Garrison/HQ: Middle Wallop Flying Station
- Motto: Nothing is Impossible

Insignia
- Squadron Badge heraldry: The Regimental emblem is the Army Air Corps Cap Badge with the Roman numerals V beneath.

5 Regiment Army Air Corps is a regiment of the British Army and is part of the Joint Aviation Command (JAC). The regiment was formerly based in Northern Ireland at Aldergrove Flying Station, but is now based at Middle Wallop Flying Station.

== History ==
5 Regiment traces its origin to the Northern Ireland Regiment formed on 1 November 1979 at RAF Aldergrove. On 1 October 1993, the Northern Ireland Regiment was renamed 5 Regiment AAC.

The regiment consisted of No. 655 (The Scottish Horse) Squadron AAC, No. 665 Squadron AAC and 1 Flight AAC. 655 Squadron operated the Westland Lynx AH7 helicopter. 665 Squadron operated the Westland Gazelle AH1 helicopter. 1 Flight operated the fixed wing Britten-Norman BN-2 Islander aircraft which had entered service on 10 March 1989.

The primary task of 1 Flight was photo reconnaissance under the direction of the Reconnaissance Intelligence Centre (Northern Ireland) (RIC(NI). In 2000, the (RIC(NI)) was renamed the Reconnaissance Intelligence Centre and Geographic Centre (Northern Ireland) (RIGC(NI)).

In March 2007, 655 Squadron was disbanded as Operation Banner was drawing to a close and due to a need to reduce the Lynx fleet set to be retired in 2012. The Lynx aircraft of 655 remained at RAF Aldergrove and was operated by 665 Squadron through to the end of Operation Banner on 31 July 2007. On 1 August 2007, Operation Helvetic commenced with 665 Squadron operating the Gazelle and 1 Flight operating the Islander.

In July 2008, No. 651 Squadron of 1 Regiment AAC moved to RAF Aldergrove and became part of 5 Regiment. 651 Squadron had been re-raised in 2006 at RAF Odiham to operate the Britten-Norman Defender fixed wing aircraft which had entered service in March 2004. 1 Flight was integrated into 651 Squadron following the squadron's move to Aldergrove.

In 2009, RAF Aldergrove was renamed Joint Helicopter Command Flying Station Aldergrove. In 2010, the tri-service RIGC(NI) became part of 5 Regiment. In 2018, the RIGC(NI) was renamed No. 3 Intelligence, Surveillance, and Reconnaissance Squadron and transferred to the Royal Air Force as part of No. 1 Intelligence, Surveillance, and Reconnaissance Wing.

On 1 April 2019, 651 Squadron and its aircraft, the Britten-Norman Defender and Britten-Norman BN-2 Islander, were transferred to the Royal Air Force as part of ISTAR Force in No. 1 Group based at RAF Waddington. 651 Squadron continued to operate the aircraft until they were retired from service on 30 June 2021. On 1 August 2021, 651 Squadron transferred back to the Army as part of 1 Regiment AAC.

By November 2024, the regiment had moved from Aldergrove Flying Station to Middle Wallop Flying Station, the home of the Army Aviation Centre and Headquarters, Army Air Corps.

The regiment had administrative responsibility for No. 29 (BATUS) Flight AAC based at Canadian Forces Base Suffield in Canada, which formerly operated Gazelle helicopters, until the flight was placed in suspended animation in October 2021.

== Structure ==
The regiment consists of:

- No. 658 Squadron AAC
- No. 665 Squadron AAC
- No. 667 Squadron AAC.

== See also ==
- List of Army Air Corps aircraft units
