= No. 12 Flight AAC =

12 Flight Army Air Corps
- Active: 1961-2009
- Country: United Kingdom
- Branch: British Army
- Size: Flight
- Part of: Army Air Corps

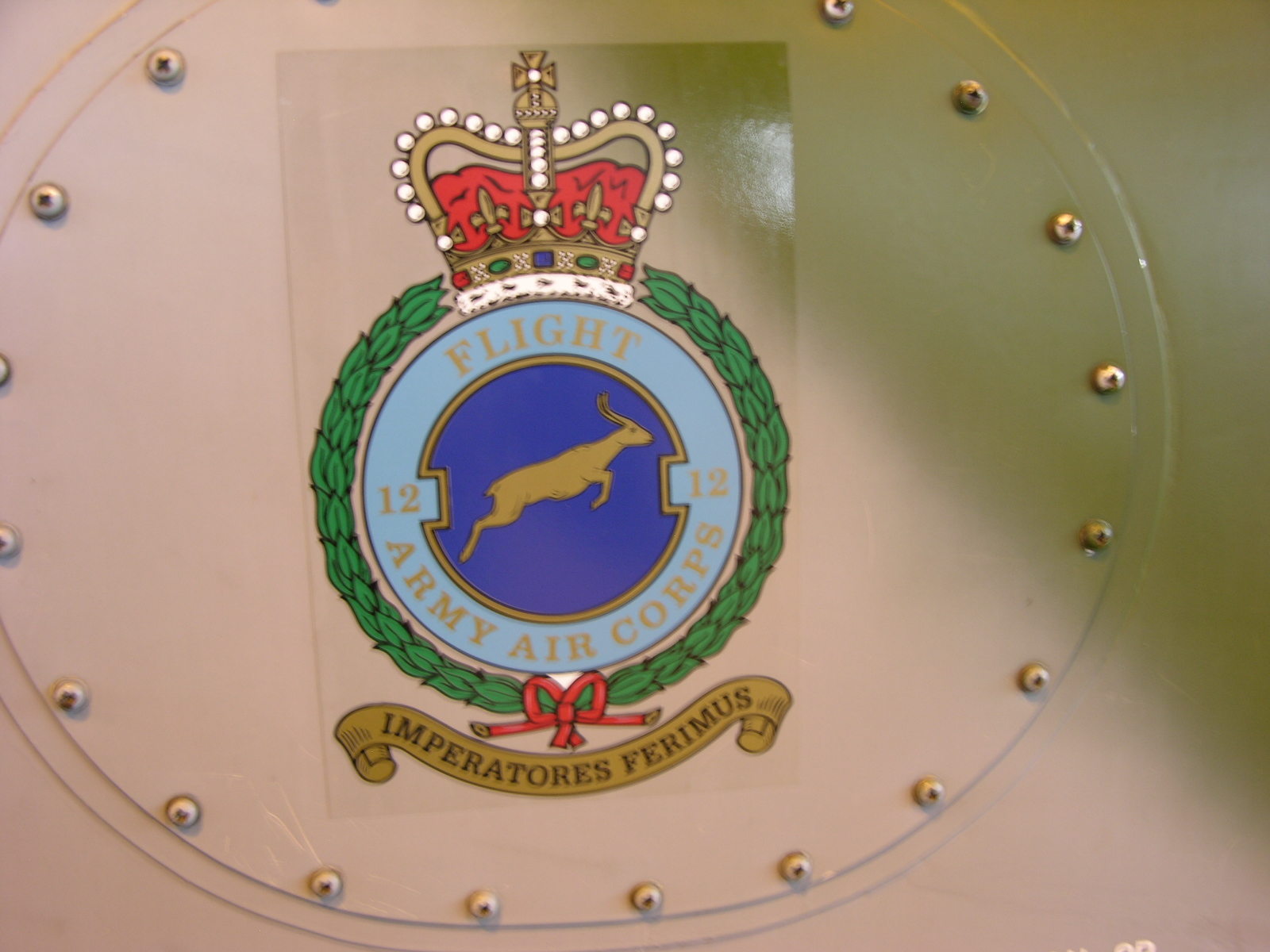
Insignia of the 12 Flight on a Gazelle.

12 Flight Army Air Corps was an independent flight of the British Army's Army Air Corps.

== History ==
Based at RAF Wildenrath in West Germany, the unit operated in the communications role in support of the British Army of the Rhine (BAOR) in Germany. The airfield is now closed and little remains to identify the former RAF Station or the hangar in which 12 Flight AAC was situated.

In 1956/58, 12 Flight AAC shared a hangar with "Visiting Air Flight", RAF. It was the next hangar down from Comms Flight RAF. It comprised three Auster Mk4 or 5 and one Auster Mk9. The primary role of the Air Flight was in support of the Commander BAOR, a four-star General, who was based at JHQ Rheindahlen in Mönchengladbach.

Towards the end of its existence, the unit operated four Westland Gazelle AH1 helicopters, which had superseded Westland Scouts, De Havilland Beavers and other earlier light helicopter and fixed-wing aircraft. 12 Flight was finally based in Javelin Barracks, Elmpt Station, the former RAF Brüggen Air Force Station. 12 Flight Army Air Corps disbanded after 57 years in Germany, after a number of designation changes to 31 Flight, 131 Flight Royal Corps of Transport, then 669 Squadron Army Air Corps and finally back to 12 Flight which it retained through to being disbanded.

== See also ==
- Army Air Corps (United Kingdom)
- RAF Wildenrath
- West Germany
- British Army of the Rhine
- JHQ Rheindahlen
- Mönchengladbach
- Elmpt Station
