= Hobart Barracks =

Hobart Barracks AAF Station Detmold R-14 Fliegerhorst Detmold
- Detmold, North Rhine-Westphalia in Germany

Site information
- Owner: Ministry of Defence
- Operator: British Army
- Controlled by: Army Air Corps

Location
- Shown within Germany
- Coordinates: 51°56′26″N 008°54′15″E

Site history
- Built: 1934
- In use: 1934-1995
- Battles/wars: Western Front (World War II); Cold War

Airfield information
Runways
Direction	Length and surface
09/27	330 metres (1,083 ft) Concrete

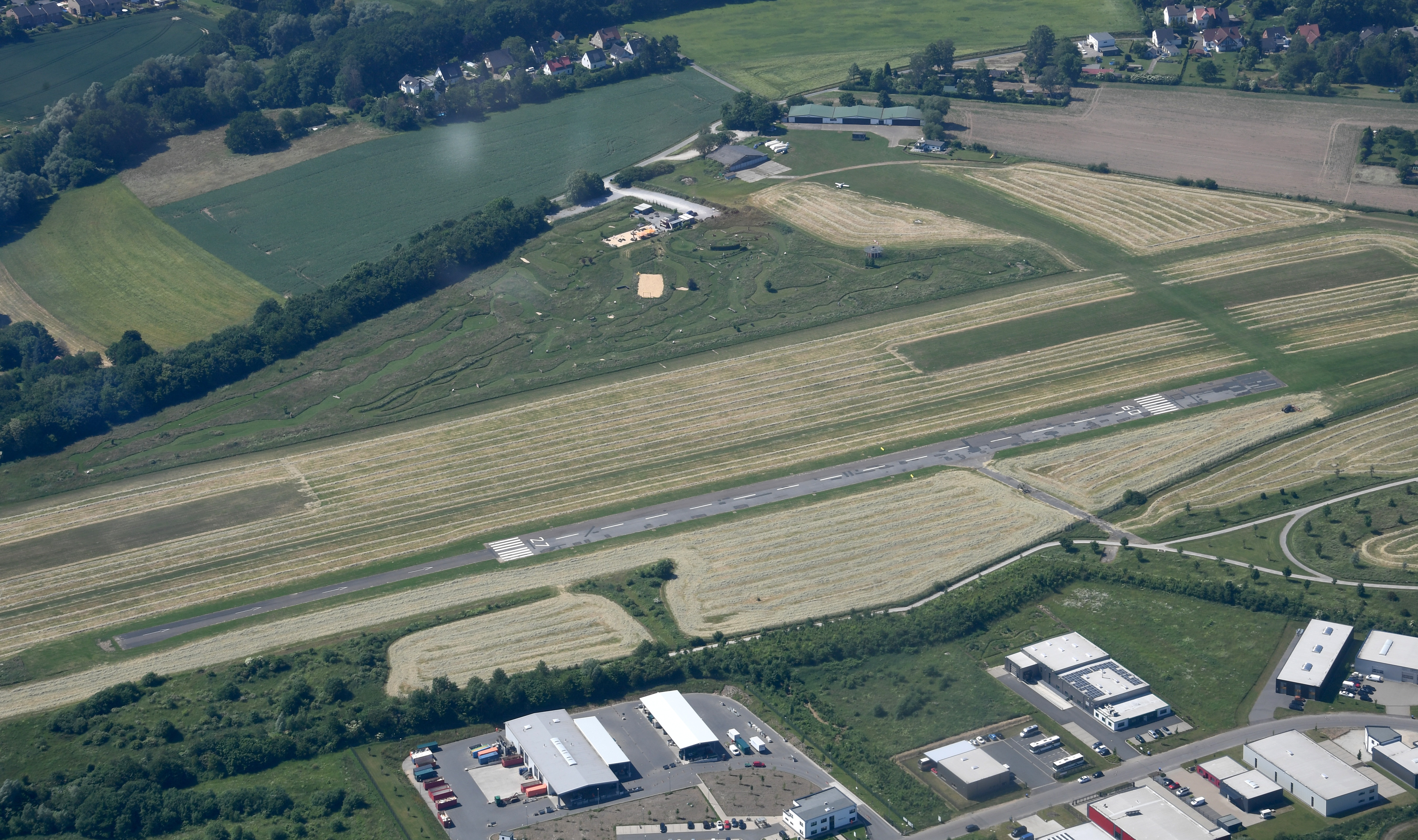
Aerial image of the Detmold airfield.

Hobart Barracks is a former military airfield, located 1.6 km east-northeast of Detmold in North Rhine-Westphalia, Germany.

== History ==
=== Inter War years ===
Flughafen Detmold was built in 1934 on the northeastern edge of the city and was intended for recreational (glider) flying. It was laid out as a 500 × 500 meters all-way grass airfield with a single hangar. Before it was opened it was already decided to expand the airfield to 700 × 700 meters. Later it was decided to expand the airfield even further (1000 × 1000 m) to allow it to be used as an emergency airfield by the Luftwaffe. Civilians only got to use the airfield briefly though, as three months later the Luftwaffe took over the airfield on 15 February 1935 and they began converting it with a number of large hangars and a barracks compound west of the airfield. A flying school and school facilities were built.

Aircraft used in flight instruction were: Bücker Bü 131, Focke-Wulf Fw 44, Heinkel He 72 biplanes and Klemm Kl 35 monoplanes for primary training. Advanced trainers flown at the airfield were Arado Ar 66, Gotha Go 145, Heinkel He 46, Focke-Wulf Fw 58, Junkers W 33 and W 34s. Such a flying school typically had around 90 training aircraft, plus a few types for type instruction for front-line service. Types that frequented the airfield were Junkers Ju 52/3m transports, Messerschmitt Bf 109 and Bf 110 fighters and Heinkel He 111 bombers.

=== Second World War ===
With the outbreak of the Second World War, front line units that used Detmold were III./JG 3 (Jagdgeschwader 3) (28 March – 10 April 1940) and 2./JG 27 (Jagdgeschwader 27) flying Bf 109Es (November 1940 – 10 January 1941). The airfield and its maintenance unit were involved in the production of the wooden Focke-Wulf Ta 154 twin-engine Moskito nightfighters. This occurred in part because the nearby furniture industry was used to produce parts for the aircraft, but development of the aircraft was terminated in late 1944. The airfield was never attacked by bombers, but allied fighters did attack it on several occasions.

In early 1945, the airfield was prepared for demolition, but due to malfunctions only a part of the maintenance hangar and the aircraft at the airfield were destroyed. In April 1945, United States Army units moved through the area and seized the facilities. IX Engineering Command, Ninth Air Force repaired the airfield, which was re-designated "Advanced Landing Ground R-14". American Army Air Force units used the airfield as a casualty evacuation and combat resupply airfield by the IX Air Service Command. The runways were hardened with PSP, and heavy cargo planes flew into the airfield, often throughout the night.

=== Cold War ===
The Americans transferred AAF Station Detmold to the British in June 1945 as part of the formation of the British Occupation Zone of Germany. It became the garrison of 20th Armoured Brigade of the British Army of the Rhine (BAOR) around April 1958, who used the airfield (known as Hobart Barracks) for army observation flights. Aircraft flying from Detmold included Auster AOP.6 (No. 652 Squadron RAF), de Havilland Canada DHC-1 Chipmunk T.10, Westland Scout AH.1s, Westland Gazelle AH.1 and Westland Lynx AH.1/AH.7 (No. 654 Squadron AAC, No. 659 Squadron AAC, No. 669 Squadron AAC) helicopters.

Both the Air Division Communication Squadron RAF and the Supreme Headquarters Allied Expeditionary Force (RAF) Communication Squadron RAF was disbanded here

In 1964, German civil aviation returned to the airfield when the LSV Detmold glider club was allowed to use the airfield.

== Current use ==
The British turned the airfield over to German authorities in 1995 after the end of the Cold War, and the airfield reopened in 1999 when glider activity, helicopters, civilian and recreational use were permitted after some changes had been made to the local infrastructure to facilitate the local population.
