= UK Military Flying Training System =

- Founded: 2008 (contract ends in 2033)
- Country: United Kingdom
- Type: Flying training design and delivery contract
- Part of: Ministry of Defence
- Head office: MOD Abbey Wood, Bristol
- Contract partners: No. 22 Group (Royal Air Force); Ascent Flight Training; Defence Equipment and Support
- Website: ascentflighttraining.com

Aircraft flown
- Trainer helicopter: Airbus Juno HT1; Airbus Jupiter HT1
- Trainer: BAE Systems Hawk T2; Beechcraft Avenger T1; Beechcraft Texan T1; Embraer Phenom T1; Grob Prefect T1

The UK Military Flying Training System (UKMFTS) takes UK armed forces aircrew from initial training through elementary, basic, and advanced flying training phases, preparing them for their arrival at their designated operational aircraft units. It is operated by Ascent Flight Training, a consortium of Lockheed Martin and Babcock International under a 25-year Private Finance Initiative (PFI) contract for the UK's Ministry of Defence (MoD), with oversight from the MoD. The airworthiness authority for each aircraft type, for example, is fulfilled by military and civilian staff within Defence Equipment and Support. Apart from the overall contract, the main elements of the system include fixed-wing elementary, multi-engine and fast-jet pilot training, rear crew training and rotary-wing (helicopter) training.

== Overview ==
The current Ascent contract provides for 23 Prefect basic trainers, 10 Texan advanced trainers and 5 Phenom 100 jets, although aircraft numbers for the present contract are much lower than the previous numbers operating - for instance, nearly 40 Tutors and 7 Beechcraft King Airs provided EFT and Multi-Engine training before the implementation of MFTS, with much of the deficit being covered by synthetic training in simulators and procedural trainers. Ascent's role is to utilise more modern aircraft and training to deliver aircrew at the standard necessary to train onto modern, 4.5 and 5th generation fast jets and other front-line aircraft, such as the Eurofighter Typhoon and Airbus A400M Atlas, as legacy systems often produced a capability gap between training and the frontline because of the outdated nature of the equipment. The Ascent aircraft will all be equipped with digital systems and glass-cockpit displays for compatibility.

Elementary Flying Training

- No. 57 Squadron (RAF Cranwell) – Grob Prefect T1
- No. 674 Squadron AAC (RAF Barkston Heath) – Grob Prefect T1
- 703 Naval Air Squadron (RAF Barkston Heath) – Grob Prefect T1

Basic Fast Jet Training

- No. 72 Squadron, RAF Valley – Beechcraft Texan T1

Advanced Fast Jet Training

- No. 4 Squadron (RAF Valley) – BAE Hawk T2
- No. 25 Squadron (RAF Valley) – BAE Hawk T2

Multi-Engine Training (including Rear Crew training)

- No. 45 Squadron (RAF Cranwell) – Embraer Phenom T1

Rotary Wing Training (including Rear Crew training)

- No. 60 Squadron (RAF Shawbury) – Airbus Juno HT1
- No. 202 Squadron (RAF Valley) – Airbus Jupiter HT1
- No. 660 Squadron AAC (RAF Shawbury) – Airbus Juno HT1
- No. 670 Squadron AAC (RAF Shawbury) – Airbus Juno HT1
- 705 Naval Air Squadron (RAF Shawbury) – Airbus Juno HT1

== Structural and contractual arrangements ==
Contractually, the Directorate of Flight Training of No. 22 Group RAF (DFT) is the user, Defence Equipment and Support (DE&S) is the customer and Ascent Flight Training is the service provider. Organisationally, the RAF's DFT is in charge of:

- Headquarters Central Flying School at RAF Cranwell
- No. 1 Flying Training School at RAF Shawbury
- No. 3 Flying Training School at RAF Cranwell
- No. 4 Flying Training School at RAF Valley

== History ==
=== Background ===
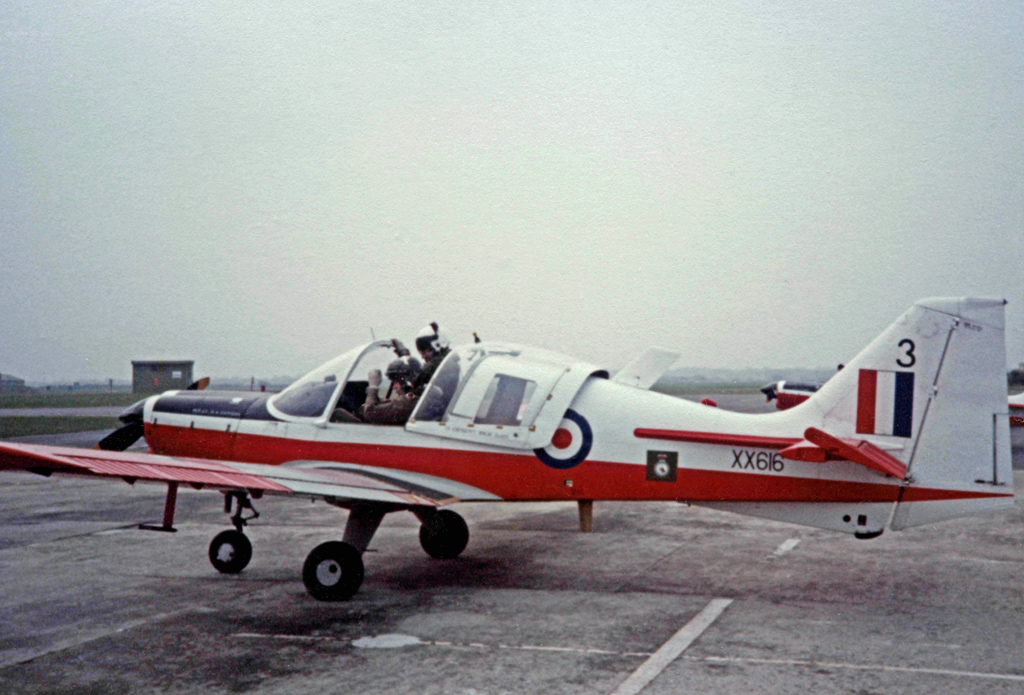
Bulldog

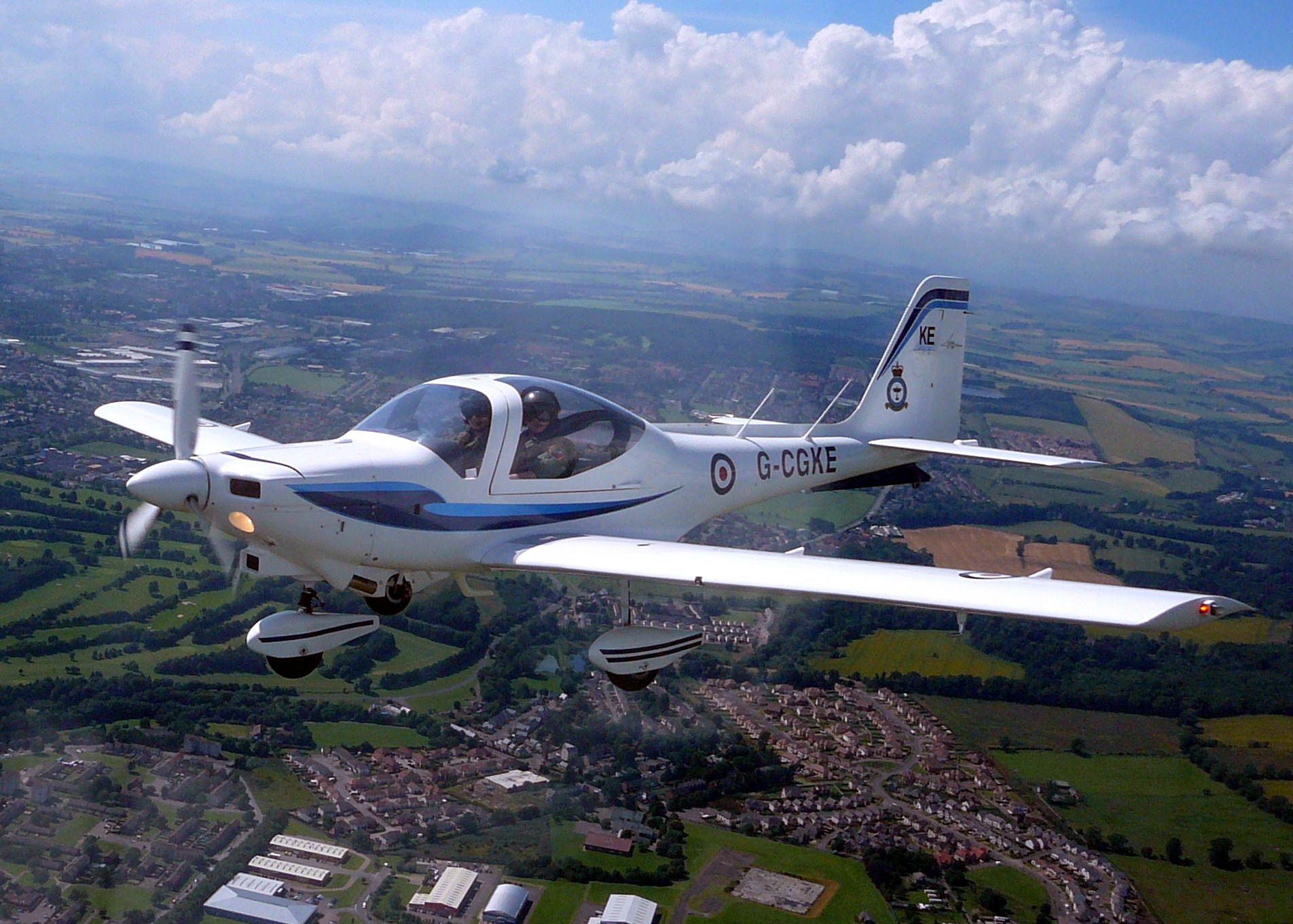
Grob Tutor T1

Putting flying training under a contract with a service provider was discussed in 2000. Bombardier Aerospace (Bombardier) had been given a PFI contract in July 1998 to replace Bulldog aircraft with the Grob 'Tutor' and also maintain them at the University Air Squadrons. 132 Bulldog primary trainers were ordered for delivery in 1973 and 1974 for use in Air Experience Flights but mostly for the University Air Squadrons. 90 Grob Tutor basic trainer aircraft were supplied on a 10-year supply and maintenance contract for university air squadrons and air cadets, from 1999.

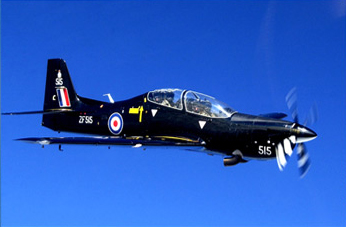
Short Tucano

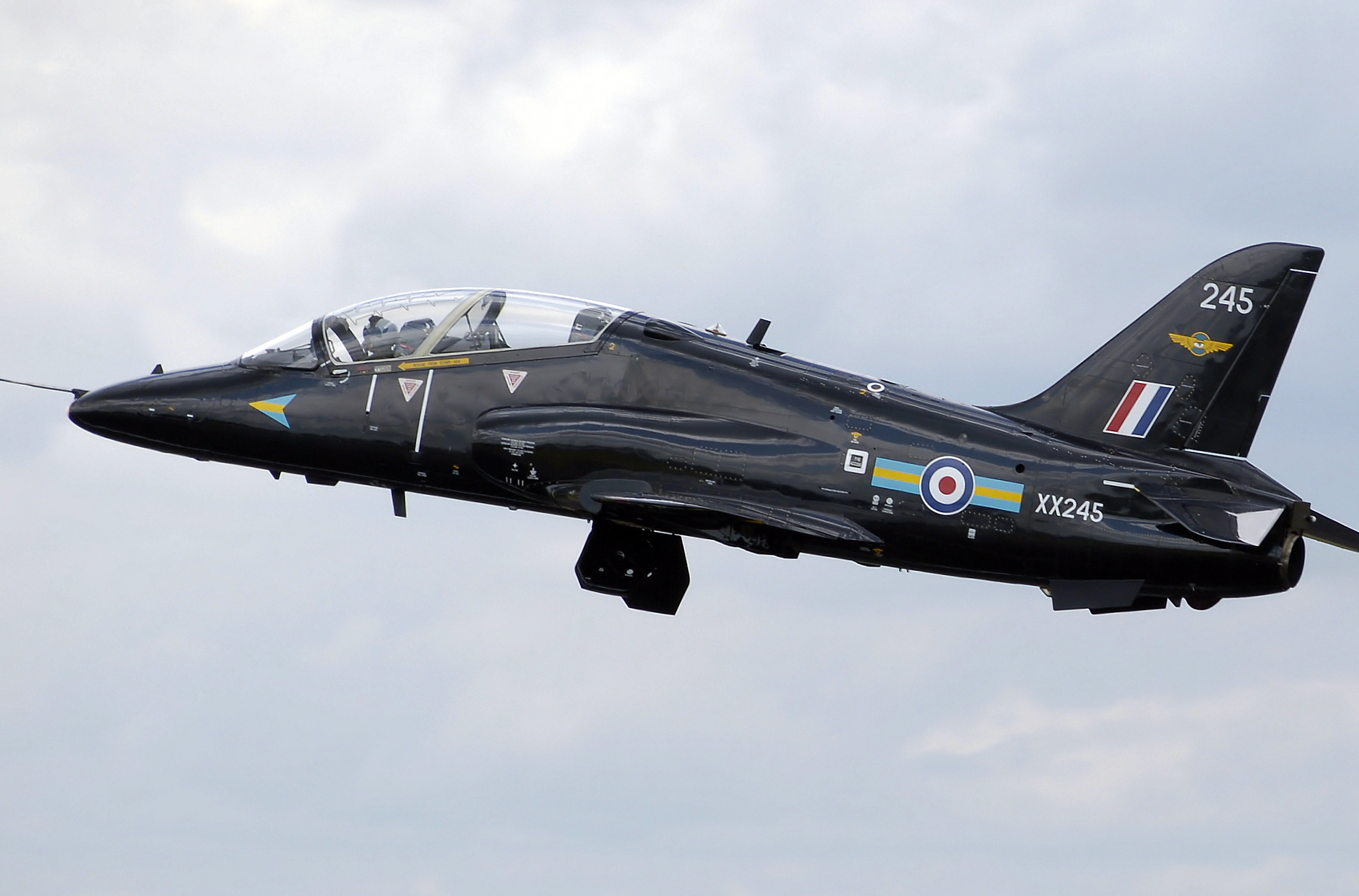
Hawk T1

The MoD expected to consider similar PFI contracts when Tucano and Hawk aircraft were replaced. 130 Tucano two seat, tandem, fully aerobatic turboprops, were on order in February 1989. The Hawk T1 advanced jet trainer entered RAF service in 1977, with 116 aircraft ordered

The Defence Costs Study had recommended that initial pilot training for multi-engine pilots should be civilianised. In February 1999, the Department had invited proposals for a restructured and civilianised multi-engine initial pilot training system, based on a long term PFI contract. The MoD had not progressed these proposals as they were then reviewing options for closer industry involvement in the delivery of flying training.

=== Main contract ===
In December 2002, £39m was approved for assessment of the UKMFTS, of which £2m related to the Advanced Jet Trainer. It was assumed that a PFI would be the method of funding.

Four consortia were in competition for the 25-year MFTS programme in 2004. Proposals had to include the financing and provision of new aircraft and training facilities. The four groups were:

BAE Systems (BAES), Serco and Bombardier
Rolls-Royce, Lockheed Martin and VT Group
Boeing and Thales
Kellogg Brown & Root, EG&G and Lear Siegler

BAES pulled out of the bidding in April 2004, citing a conflict of interest as it was supplying the Hawks for the fast-jet training program. At the close of 2006, the MFTS contract was awarded to the Ascent consortium which included VT Group and Lockheed Martin. The 25-year PFI contract, to outsource training of military pilots and air crew of all three UK armed forces to the private sector, was valued at £6 billion. The system was expected to be fully operational by 2012.

The MoD reported, in 2008, that the proposed UKMFTS would deliver a coherent, flexible and integrated flying training capability catering for the needs of the Royal Navy, RAF and AAC. The system was judged, at the time, to be at risk of being unable to deliver the required quantity and quality of aircrew to meet the input standard for the operational conversion units. The existing training platforms were approaching the end of their useful lives and included outdated systems that were unable to prepare trainees for current and future frontline aircraft. The system was based on a number of separate contractual arrangements for the provision of equipment and support. Consequently, the system was piecemeal, difficult to manage and inefficient. It also introduced significant delays due to lengthy training programmes and gaps between courses. The focus was to achieve a holistic system based on capability and service delivery, and not solely on the provision of aircraft platforms. It was to offer an opportunity to modernise the flying-training processes for all three services, realise efficiencies and, since training was then spread across several organisations, take advantage of potential economies of scale. £39 million was allocated for assessment of a public-private partnership contractual partnering model, with a mix of Private Finance Initiative and conventional procurement. This envisaged the appointment of a Training System Partner to work with the MoD over the life of the project to deliver incrementally the total aircrew training requirement.

In February 2011, the Ascent Flight Training consortium was in the final stages of selecting and introducing new equipment and infrastructure, including ground-based training systems. Royal Navy basic training courses would use new Hawker Beechcraft King Air 350ERs and BAE Systems Hawk T2 advanced jet trainers would be introduced for RAF training.

=== Elementary, basic and multi-engine pilot training ===
At the close of 2012, the Lockheed Martin-Babcock consortium running the MFTS re-launched a competition for a contractor to supply and support fixed-wing elementary aircraft. This part of the project had been on hold because of the UK's strategic defence and security review. Competitors were:

Consortium	Elementary	Basic	Multi-engine
BAE Systems, Babcock, Gama and Pilatus	Grob 115E 'Tutor	Pilatus PC-21	Cessna Citation Mustang
EADS Cassidian, CAE and Cobham	Grob G 120TP	Beechcraft T-6C	-
Elbit Systems and KBR	Grob G 120TP	Beechcraft T-6C	Embraer Phenom 100

Future UKMFTS Locations: EFT/Multi-Engine: RAF Cranwell & RAF Barkston Heath; BFJT/AFJT: RAF Valley; Rotary: RAF Shawbury & AAC Middle Wallop

Ascent awarded Elbit Systems and KBR a contract to supply 38 new training aircraft through their joint company known as Affinity Flight Training Systems, which was given a $500m contract to purchase the new airframes.

The Grob G 120TP, known in RAF service as the Prefect T1, started to operate from RAF Barkston Heath and RAF Cranwell from January 2018, delivering 40 hours of conventional flying and 20 synthetic hours to aircrew students. A new Ascent ground training building, incorporating the simulators and synthetic training facilities, was built at RAF Cranwell to accommodate the new MFTS courses. The legacy Tutor courses were to continue into 2018 as the Prefect courses built up to full capacity, and EFT operations at RAF Wittering were likely to cease by the end of the year. In 2018, 3 Flying Training School aimed to graduate 250 aircrew students from all three services, including some 40 students who would undertake training at University Air Squadrons owned by 6 FTS. The normal rhythm for MFTS would initially be 230 students per year. The Phenom 100 aircraft would also be based at RAF Cranwell, delivering multi-engine training following a short multi-engine lead-in course on the Prefect.

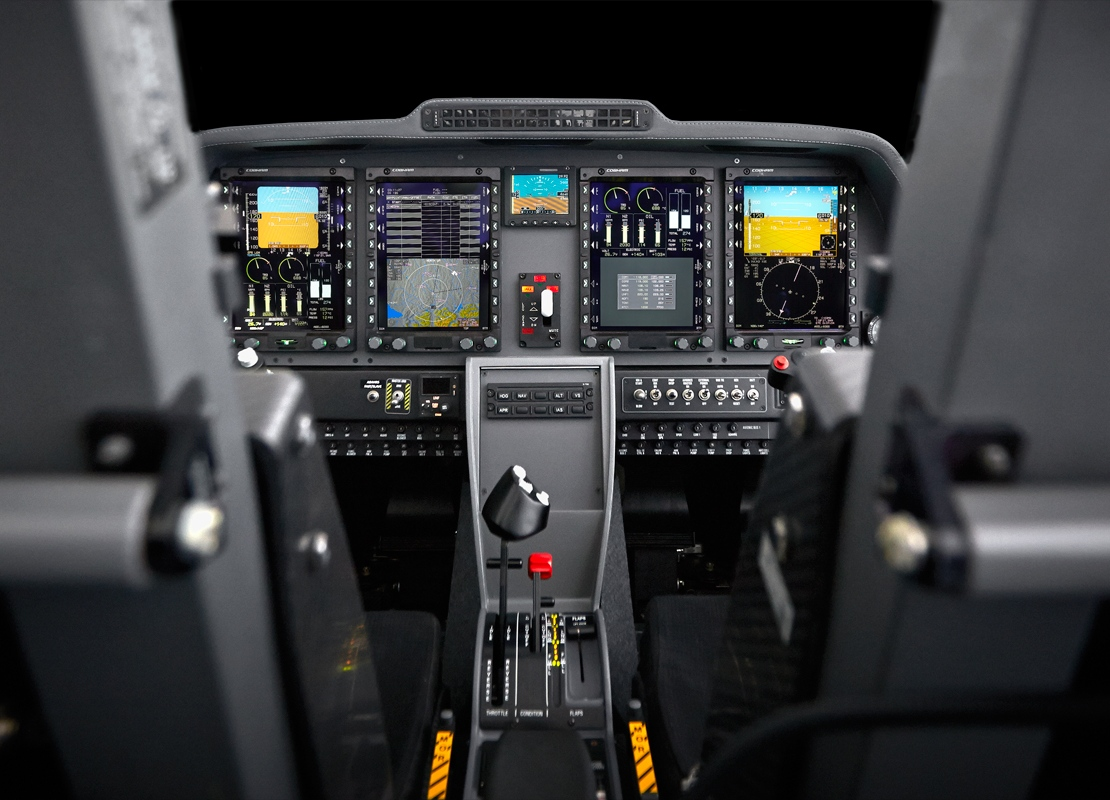
Prefect T.1 digital cockpit

The T-6 Texan II aircraft replaced Tucano T.1s currently based at RAF Linton-on-Ouse. The new Basic Fast Jet Training course will be moved to RAF Valley, alongside the Advanced Fast Jet Training course which operates with Hawk T2 aircraft.

== Rear crew training ==
=== Royal Navy ===
This covers Royal Navy observer training for aircrew destined for Wildcat HMA2 and Merlin HM2 helicopter squadrons. Stage 1 training for Royal Navy rear aircrew was established, in late 2011, at RAF Barkston Heath using the MoD's existing Grob 115Es, and at RNAS Culdrose, using four Ascent-owned King Air 350ERs.

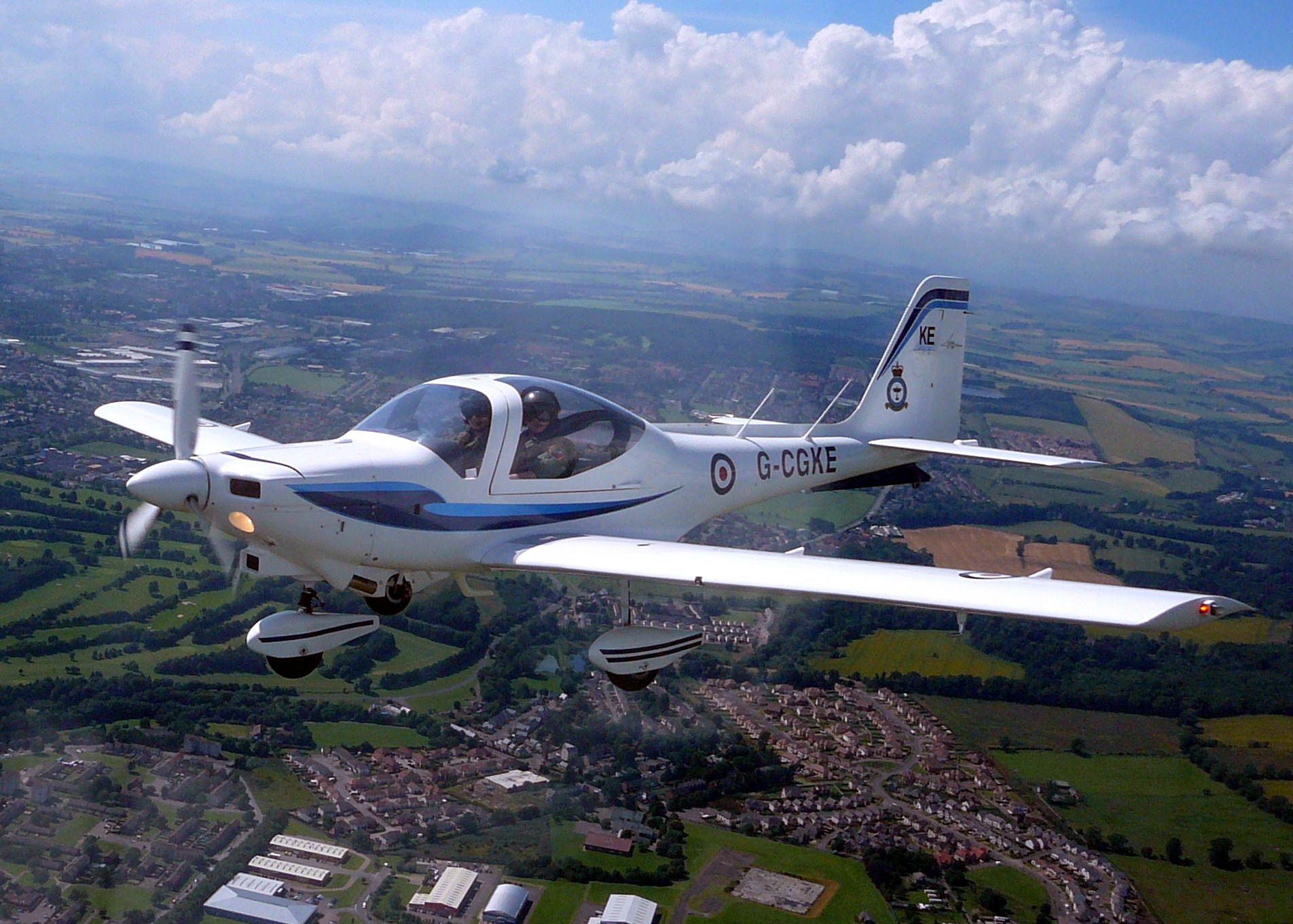
Grob 115E 'Tutor'

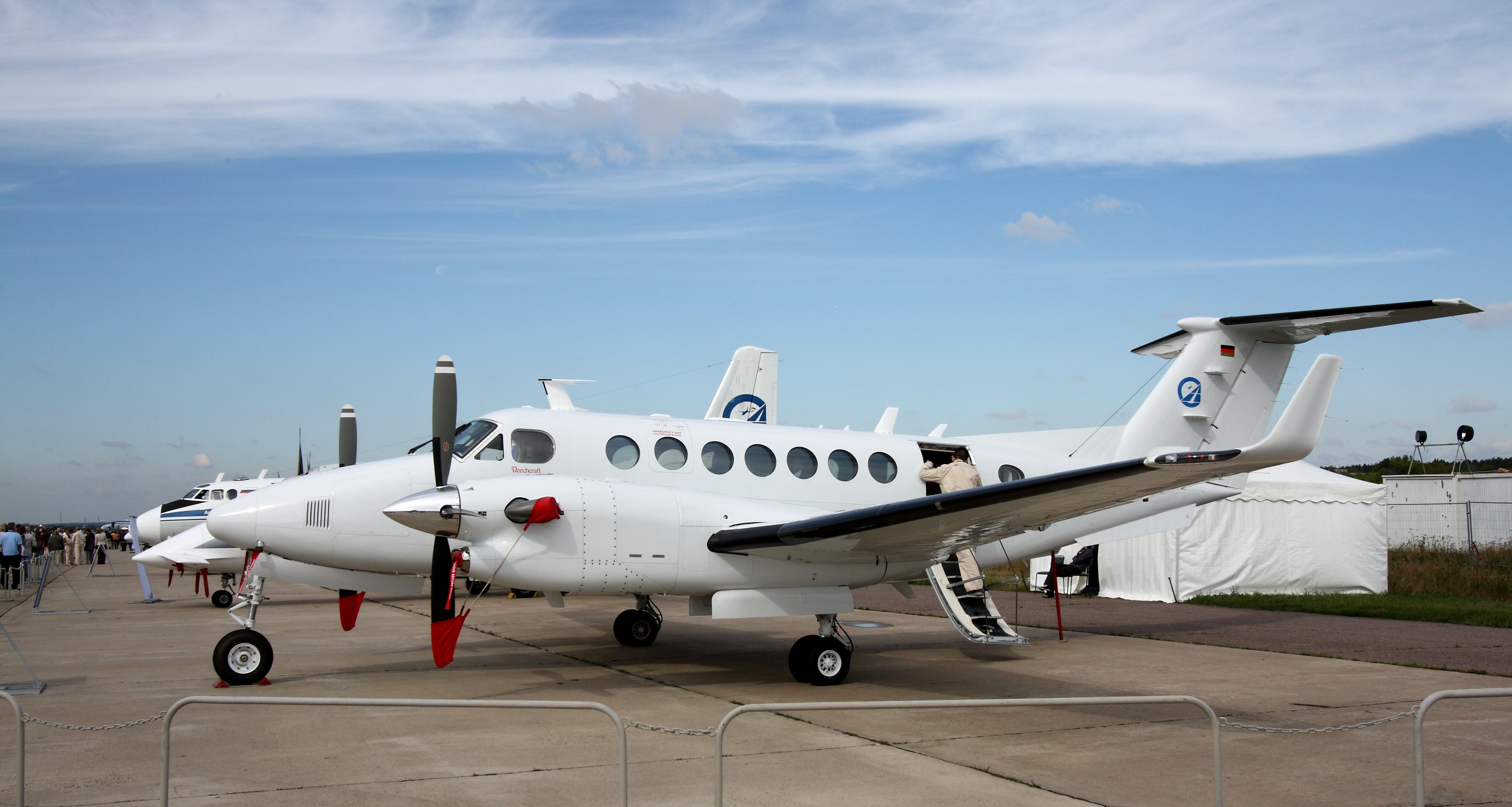
Beechcraft King Air 350

=== Royal Air Force ===
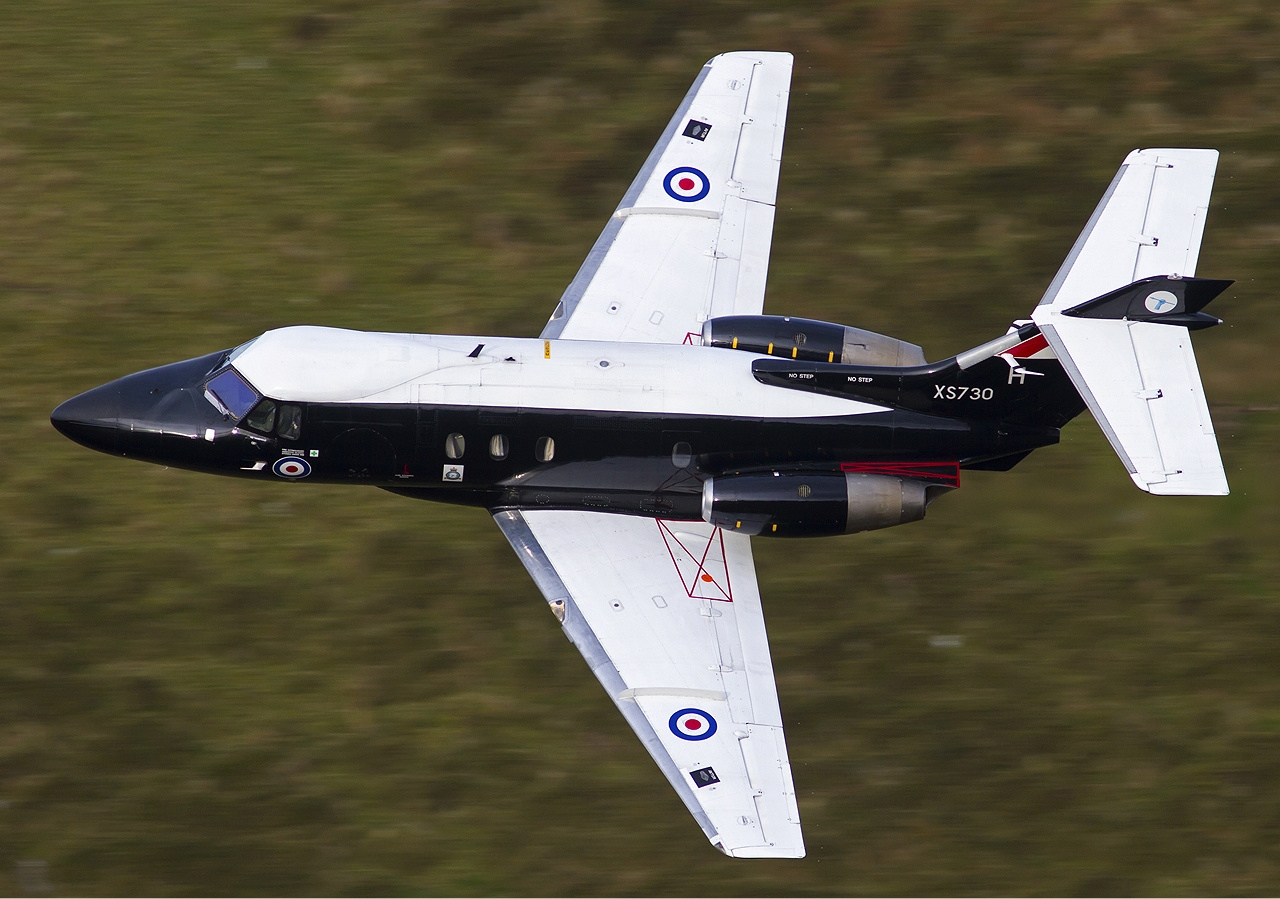
Royal Air Force Hawker Siddeley Dominie T1, 2010

The Hawker Siddeley Dominie was retired in 2011 after 45 years in service. It had been used in the training of Navigators, Weapons Systems Officers, Air Electronics Operators Air Engineers and Air Loadmasters.

The Ministry of Defence procured a number of Beechcraft B200 aircraft in 2003, five operated by contractor Cobham Aviation Services, to supply rear crew training for the Royal Navy with 750 NAS at RNAS Culdrose, while seven aircraft operated by Serco with 45 Squadron at RAF Cranwell train both multi-engine aircrew and rear seat aircrew officers and non-commissioned airmen. The King Airs were equipped with glass cockpits and advanced systems to prepare students for their Operational Conversion Unit training onto frontline multi-engined aircraft such as the C-17, A400M and C130J Hercules fleets.

The Beechcraft aircraft were retired in favour of the Embraer Phenom 100 aircraft under the new UKMFTS contract, with the first sorties flown in 2018.

== Rotary-wing training (RWT) ==
In October 1996 a contract was placed with FBS, a company formed between Flight Refuelling Aviation, Bristows Helicopters Ltd and Serco. This 15-year contract not only covered the engineering and supply aspects already in place, but also included the provision of the 35 Squirrel HT1 and Griffin HT1 helicopters for the Defence Helicopter Flying School at RAF Shawbury. In practice, FBS now sub-contracts the support of the DHFS and RAF Shawbury to FB Heli Services (formerly FR Aviation Services) thus maintaining the partnership between the company and RAF Shawbury forged over the 5 years previous to that contract. Also included in the contract was the provision of 40% of the helicopter instructors, Operations Support staff and Flight Systems Operators in the Central Air Traffic Control School.

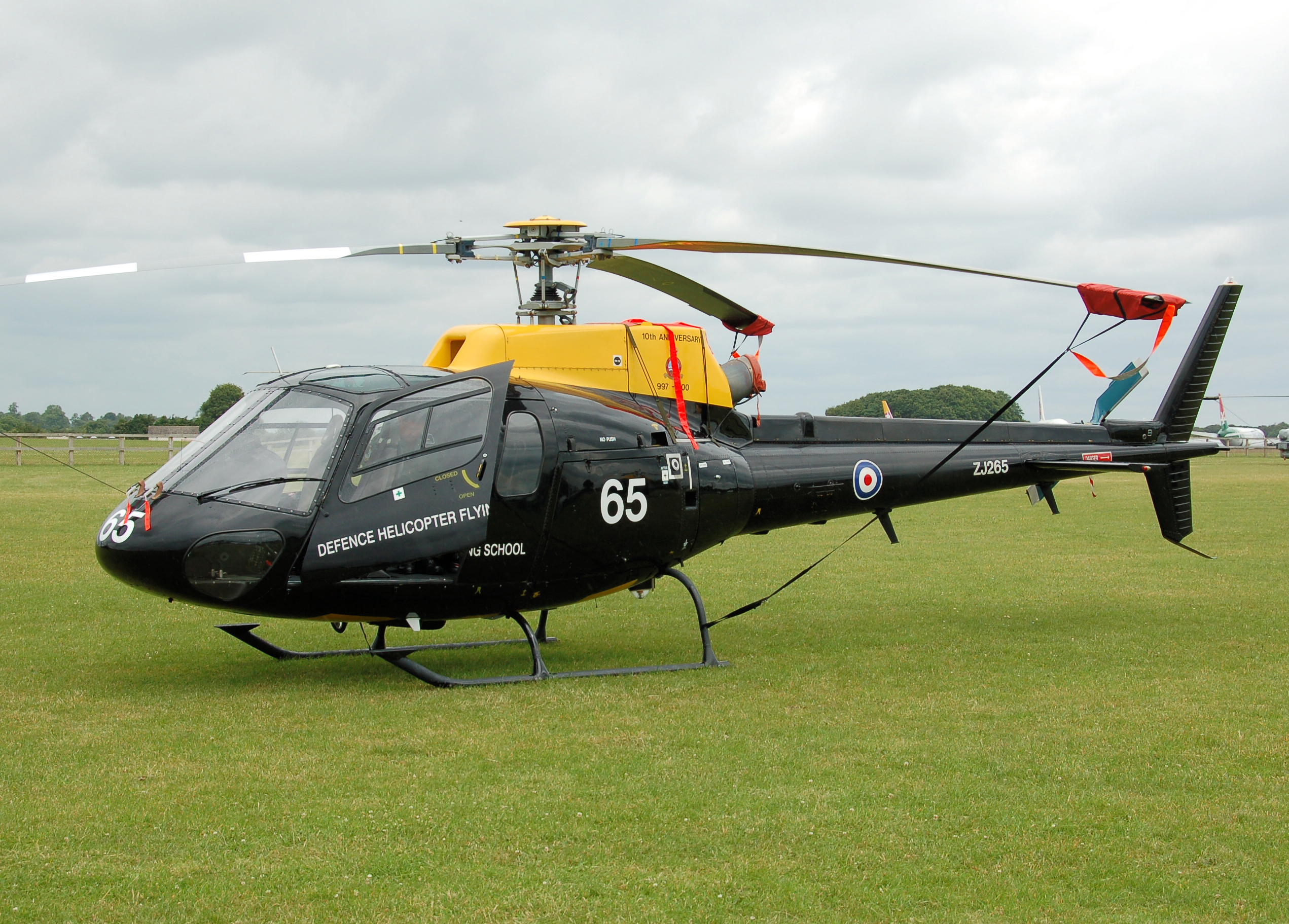
One of the school's Squirrels

The UKMFTS training helicopters acquisition program had been shelved by mid 2012, but a four-year extension was granted to the FB Heliservices contract to run the DHFS at RAF Shawbury. FB Heliservices, which had already run DHFS for 15 years, was a joint venture between Cobham and Bristow Helicopters.

In 2013, Ascent proposed modified versions of the bids originally provided by the two contestants for the requirement: AgustaWestland and Alphar (a Eurocopter, FB Heliservices and CAE consortium). The contract was for a ten-year interim period rather than the full life of the MFTS PFI.

The Defence Equipment and Support (DE&S) organisation announced, in September 2014, that six companies had been invited to bid on the new Rotary Wing Training Programme (RWTP) that will replace the old Defence Helicopter Flying School (DHFS) out-sourcing contract, in place since 1997. The MoD anticipated selecting the winning bid in 2016, with the new service becoming operational in 2018.

In 2016, Ascent Flight Training selected Airbus Helicopters to supply 32 helicopters to train Fleet Air Arm, Army Air Corps and Royal Air Force rotary aircrew in a £500m contract out to 2033. Airbus will provide 29 H135 airframes, to be known as Juno HT1 in service, and 3 H145 airframes, known as Jupiter HT1. Due to the reduced requirement for Search and Rescue training following the privatisation of SAR provision, only 3 larger H145 aircraft are to be procured. The fleet is entirely twin-engine, replacing the single engine Squirrel HT.1 in service, as nearly all helicopters now operated by the UK military are twin-engined, apart from the Army Gazelle AH.1, which is due for retirement. Full training capability was expected by 1 April 2018, the RAF's 100th anniversary, to operate from RAF Shawbury and AAC Middle Wallop. Ascent expects to train 286 tri-service aircrew a year. In 2020 was ordered 4 more H145

== Advanced Jet Trainer ==
The MoD required an Advanced Jet Trainer for pre-operational training of fast-jet pilots. It was then being carried out using the BAE Systems Hawk, which would need to be replaced in the tactical weapons training role from 2010 onwards. The full range of skills required for aircrew to fly front-line aircraft could not then be gained using the Hawk, so more training on operational aircraft had to be undertaken. The introduction of the Eurofighter Typhoon and the future Joint Combat Aircraft exacerbated this training gap such that the required standard for Typhoon aircrew was not achievable with the Hawk.

The Advanced Jet Trainer was to be the fast jet element of the UKMFTS programme, with a modern glass cockpit environment, modern avionics, front-line sensor simulation and weapons and a flexible and upgradeable mission system. The requirement included support, infrastructure and a ground based training environment. It was envisaged that it could eventually be subsumed within the main UKMTS.

The £1bn deal to supply up 31 BAE Systems Hawks was said to be at risk in early 2003 because the MoD wanted to compare the BAE Systems bid with the Italian Aermacchi M-346. The MoD had wanted a leasing deal under the private finance initiative (PFI), to transfer risk to the contractor rather than buy aircraft outright, with at least 11,000 flying hours a year being required. The upfront costs of developing and building the new aircraft, while waiting for lease payments, were not favoured by BAE Systems, and the first PFI proposal that was submitted in March 2003 was considered too expensive by the Treasury.

By April 2003, UK ministers had rejected calls for full-scale international competition against manufacturers of the M-346 and the T-50 Golden Eagle. The future of the Brough site would have been in serious doubt had BAE Systems lost the contract. Although the Hawk had been designed in the 1970s, BAE Systems offers an updated version with advanced avionics plus an upgraded Rolls-Royce engine.

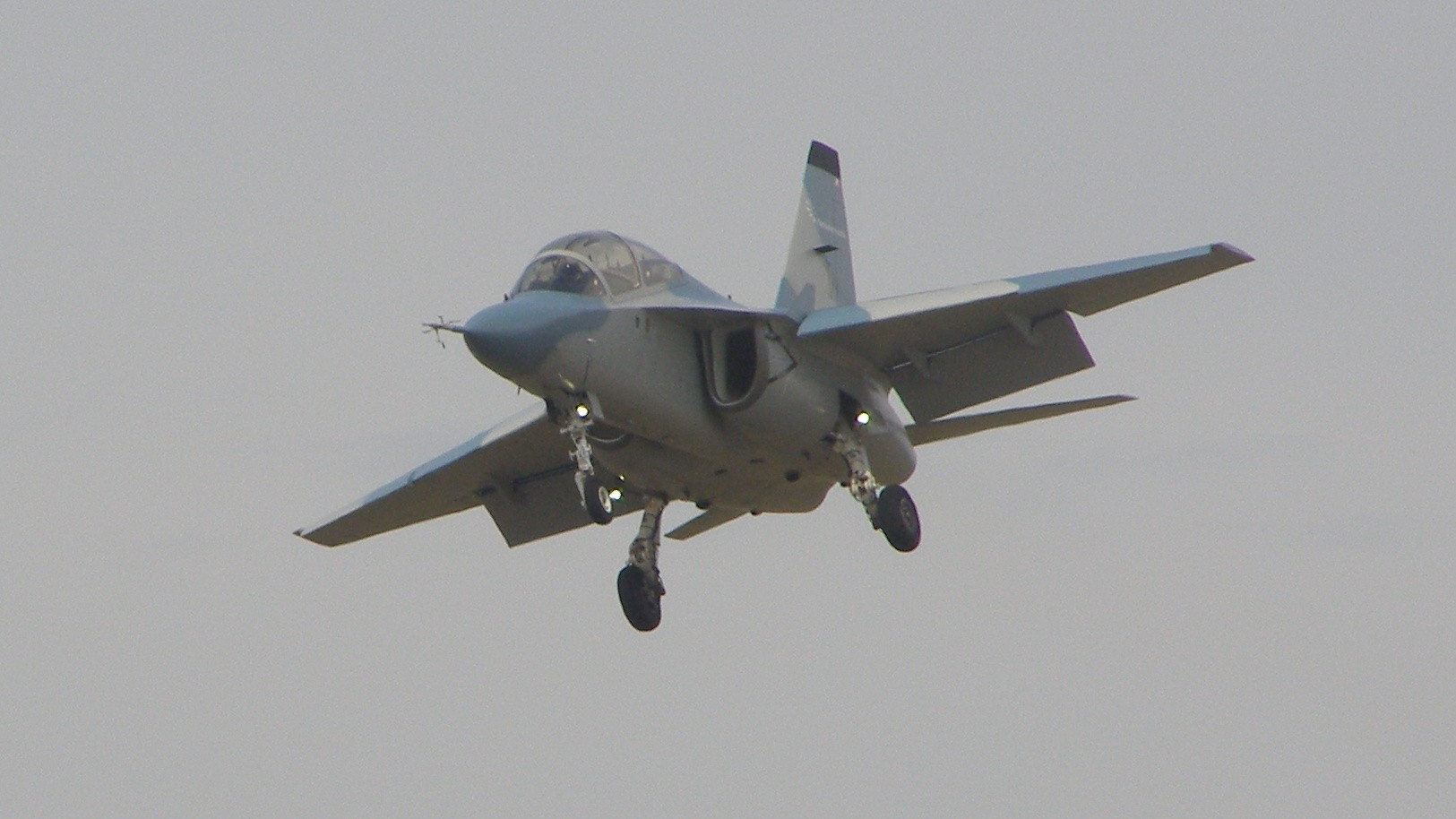
An M-346 at Farnborough Airshow in 2010

Gordon Brown tried to intervene but was over-ruled by Tony Blair in a dispute against Geoff Hoon. Brown had wanted to reduce costs by putting the contract out to competitive tender, but jobs and export orders were considered more important. The purchase cost of the 44 aircraft was expected to be around £800 million. The original proposal envisaged BAE Systems providing both the new training system and the Hawk 128 jets in a PFI arrangement. But the BAE Systems package was judged unaffordable by the Treasury. The remainder of UKMFTS contract, estimated to be worth about £9 billion at the time, would therefore be opened up to competition as a separate contract. A ministerial direction was given to conventionally procure 20 Hawk 128s from BAE Systems, with an option for a further 24 on 30 Jul 2003. The decision is reported to have saved at least 470 BAE Systems jobs at Brough in east Yorkshire.

A£31m contract was placed with BAE Systems to cover risk reduction activities to October 2003. In November 2004, approval was given for a combined assessment & development phase at up to £196m and completion by August 2008, with the assessment phase element being approximately £75m. The MoD awarded a Design and Development Contract to BAE Systems on 22 December 2004. The Hawk 128 Advanced Jet Trainer aircraft was expected to cost approximately £3.5 billion throughout 20-year lifetime.

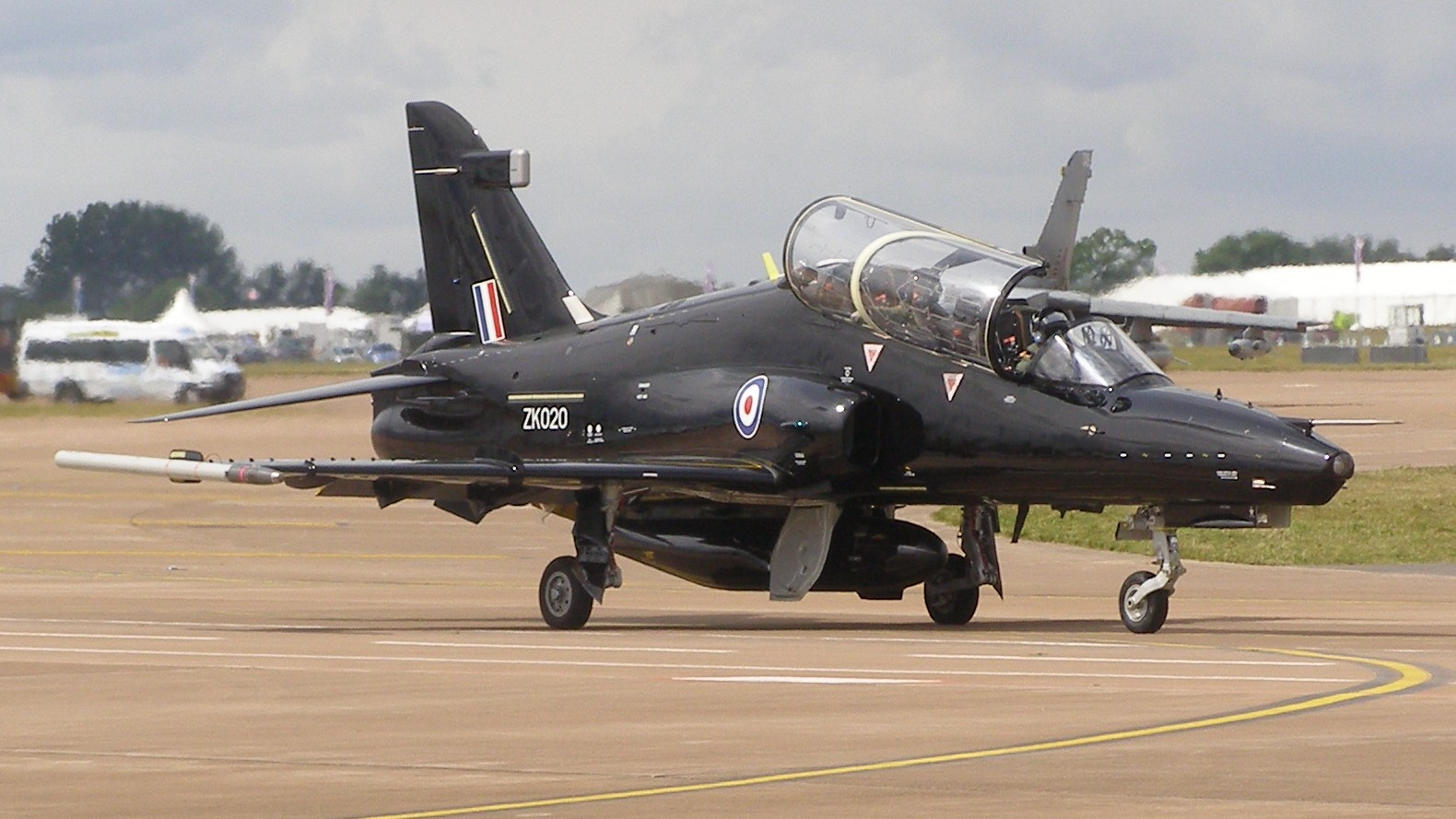
Hawk T2 of the Royal Air Force (2009)

According to the National Audit Office: in August 2006, approval was reached for a figure of up to £497m with an estimated 80% confidence level of achieving this. This approval set the aircraft build standard, definition of in-service date, key system requirements and aircraft numbers.

The RAF began receiving the first Hawk T2s in 2009, as the start of the long term replacement for the ageing T1. Hawk T2 Advanced jet training was to be carried out at RAF Valley. Training operations on the Hawk T2 began in April 2012.
