= Defence Helicopter Flying School =

1997–2020 UK military flying school

Coordinates: 52.792°N 2.665°W

- Badge of the Defence Helicopter Flying School
- Active: 1 April 1997 – February 2020 (continued as No. 1 FTS)
- Country: United Kingdom
- Branch: Naval Service; British Army; Royal Air Force
- Type: Flying training school
- Role: Basic and advanced helicopter training
- Part of: No. 22 Group RAF
- Home stations: RAF Shawbury (HQ) and RAF Valley
- Mottos: Gaudeo Volatu (Latin for 'I take joy from flight')
- Aircraft: Squirrel HT1/2 (1997 – 2018); Bell Griffin HT1 (1997 – 2018); Juno HT1 (2018 – 2020); Jupiter HT1 (2018 – 2020)

Insignia
- Unit aircraft codes: Last two digits of serial number (Squirrel); Single letter, with all aircraft together spelling S I X T Y R U L E (Griffin); Last two digits of serial number (Juno and Jupiter)

The Defence Helicopter Flying School (DHFS) was a military flying school based at RAF Shawbury in Shropshire, England. The school, established in 1997, was a tri-service organisation and trained helicopter aircrews for all three British armed forces. It initially used the Eurocopter Squirrel HT1 and Bell Griffin HT1 helicopters, which were retained despite the introduction of the Airbus Juno HT1 and Airbus Jupiter HT1.

The school was re-badged as No. 1 Flying Training School during February 2020 and continues to provide helicopter training for the British armed forces.

== History ==
=== Background ===
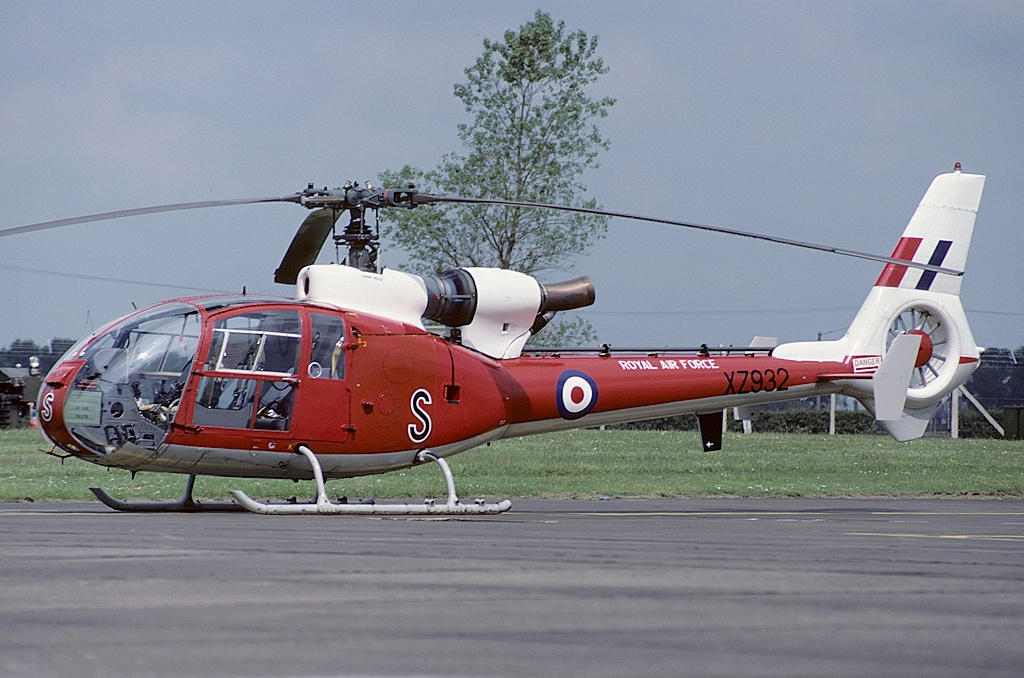
A Westland Gazelle HT.3 of No. 2 Flying Training School, used by the RAF for training prior to 1997.

Prior to the establishment of the Defence Helicopter Flying School (DHFS) in 1997, each of the UK's air-arms provided their own helicopter crew training. The Royal Air Force (RAF) trained crews using the Westland Gazelle HT.3 at No. 2 Flying Training School based at RAF Shawbury in Shropshire and 705 Naval Air Squadron of the Fleet Air Arm (FAA) operated the Gazelle HT.2 from RNAS Culdrose in Cornwall. The Army Air Corps (AAC) trained crews at AAC Middle Wallop in Hampshire.

Frontline First: The Defence Costs Study, published by the Ministry of Defence in July 1994, recommended that UK military helicopter training be amalgamated into a new tri-service Defence Helicopter Flying School, to be based either at RAF Shawbury or Middle Wallop. The study also recommended an increase in the use of civilian instructors.

In October 1996, a private finance initiative contract was placed with FBS, a consortium of Flight Refuelling Aviation (FRA – later Cobham), Bristows Helicopters Ltd and Serco, each holding a 33.3% share of the company. The 15-year contract ran from 23 November 1996 to 31 March 2012. Serco left the consortium during 1998.

The contract included the provision of thirty-four Eurocopter AS350 Écureuil helicopters (known as the Squirrel HT1/2 in military service) and eleven Bell 412EP (known as the Griffin HT1), as well as helicopter engineering and support which were already being provided by FRA Serco under an existing contract. The helicopters were civilian owned but military registered and 40% of instructors were to be civilians. Compared to the existing training arrangements, the government expected the DHFS to provide £80m of savings over the 15-year contract period.

=== Establishment ===
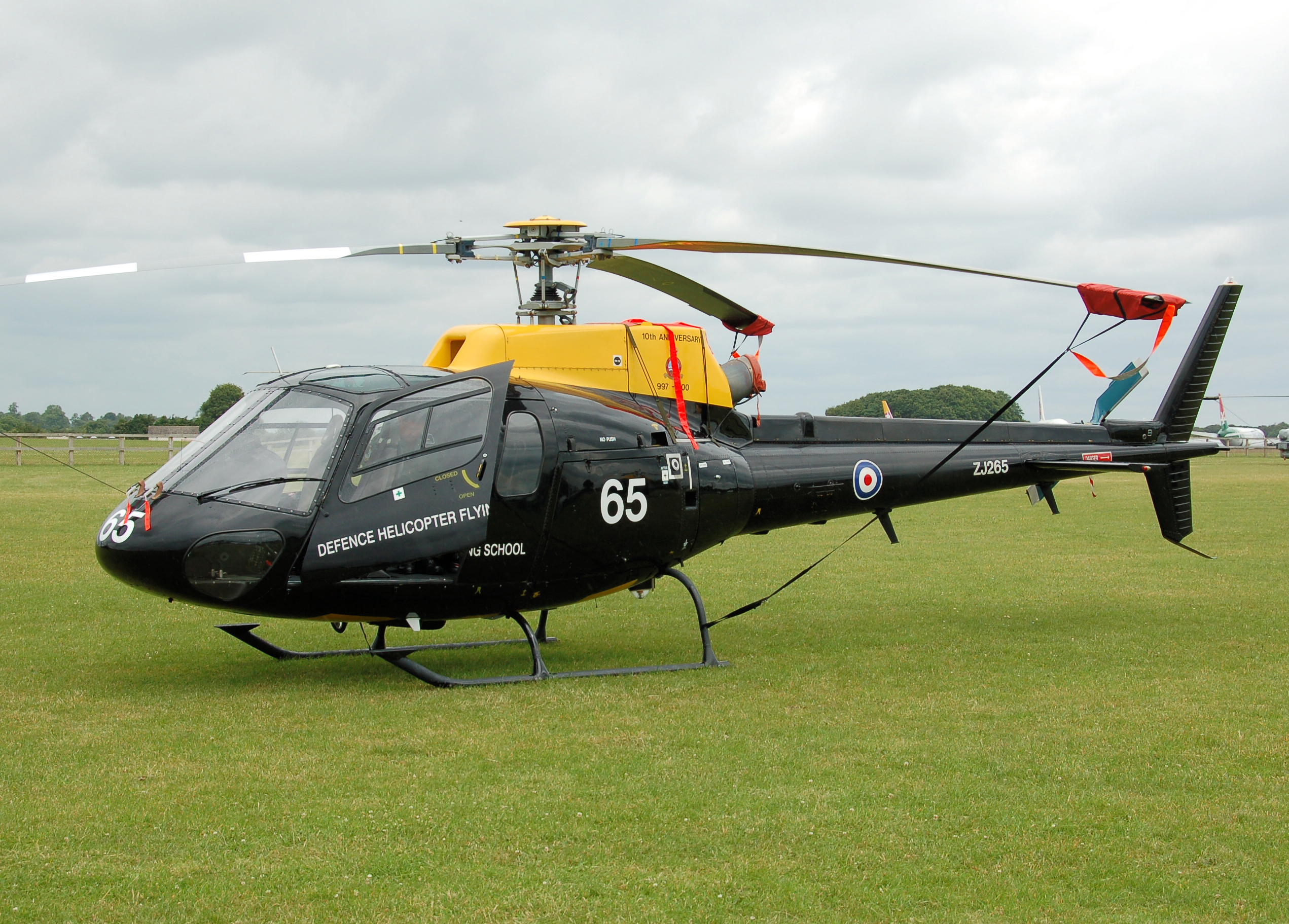
A Eurocopter Squirrel HT1 of the Defence Helicopter Flying School

The Defence Helicopter Flying School (DHFS) was established on 1 April 1997, with RAF Shawbury being selected as the new home of military helicopter training. The RAF's No. 60 Squadron disbanded at RAF Benson and the squadron number-plate was transferred to the RAF element of the DHFS. The squadron was joined at Shawbury by 705 Naval Air Squadron (NAS) and No. 660 Squadron of the Army Air Corps. The school was officially opened on 9 April 1997 by the then Vice-Chief of the Defence Staff, Air Chief Marshal Sir John Willis.

Between 1997 and 2018, the DHFS comprised a headquarters and five squadrons in the following roles.

- Ground Training Squadron – provided initial academic training prior to students moving onto a flying squadron.
- No. 660 Squadron (ACC) – the Single Engine Basic Rotary Wing Squadron provided basic helicopter flying training using the Squirrel HT1/2.
- 705 Naval Air Squadron (FAA) – the Single Engine Advanced Rotary Wing Squadron provided advanced helicopter flying training using the Squirrel HT1/2.
- No. 60 (R) Squadron (RAF) – the Multi-Engine Advanced Rotary Wing Squadron provided RAF students with multi-engine helicopter flying training using the Griffin HT1.
- Search and Rescue Training Unit – based at RAF Valley on Anglesey in Wales, taught students search and rescue techniques using the Griffin HT1.

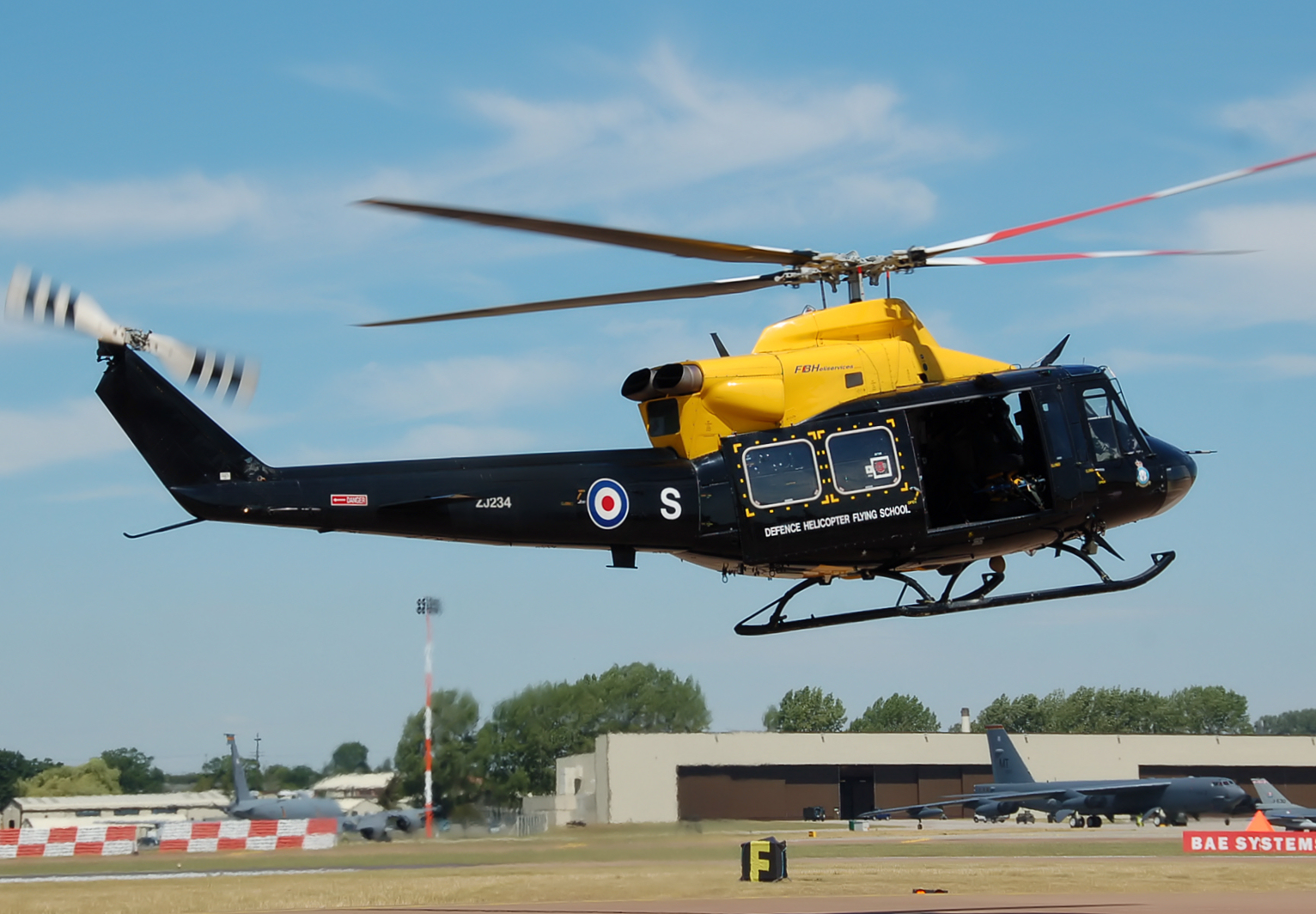
A Bell Griffin HT1 of the Defence Helicopter Flying School

All DHFS helicopters featured a black and yellow colour scheme. The Squirrels received codes reflecting the last two digits of their serial number, whereas each of the Griffins of No. 60(R) Squadron had a single letter applied, which together spelt 'SIXTY RULE OK'.

FB Heliservices, a subsidiary company set-up by FBS, commenced trading on 1 April 2001 and took responsibility for the provision of aircraft and services to the DHFS.

=== 10th anniversary ===
In May 2007, the DHFS celebrated its 10th anniversary when the Prince of Wales, who is Colonel in Chief of the Army Air Corps, attended a ceremony at RAF Shawbury. The ceremony included a flypast of four Griffin and eight Squirrel helicopters in a number '10' formation. In the first ten years, 2,885 students passed through the school and its Squirrel fleet accumulated over 250,000 flying hours.

=== Contract renewal ===
In 2012, the initial 15-year contract with FBS (later FB Heliservices) came to an end. A new £193m four-year contract with two possible one year extensions, was placed with FB Heliservices and commenced on 1 April 2012. The contract involved the continued provision of helicopter flying training at RAF Shawbury, RAF Valley and AAC Middle Wallop, together with support services at Shawbury and Middle Wallop. After purchasing Bristow's share of the company in July 2013, Cobham became full owner of FB Heliservices.

=== UK Military Flying Training System ===
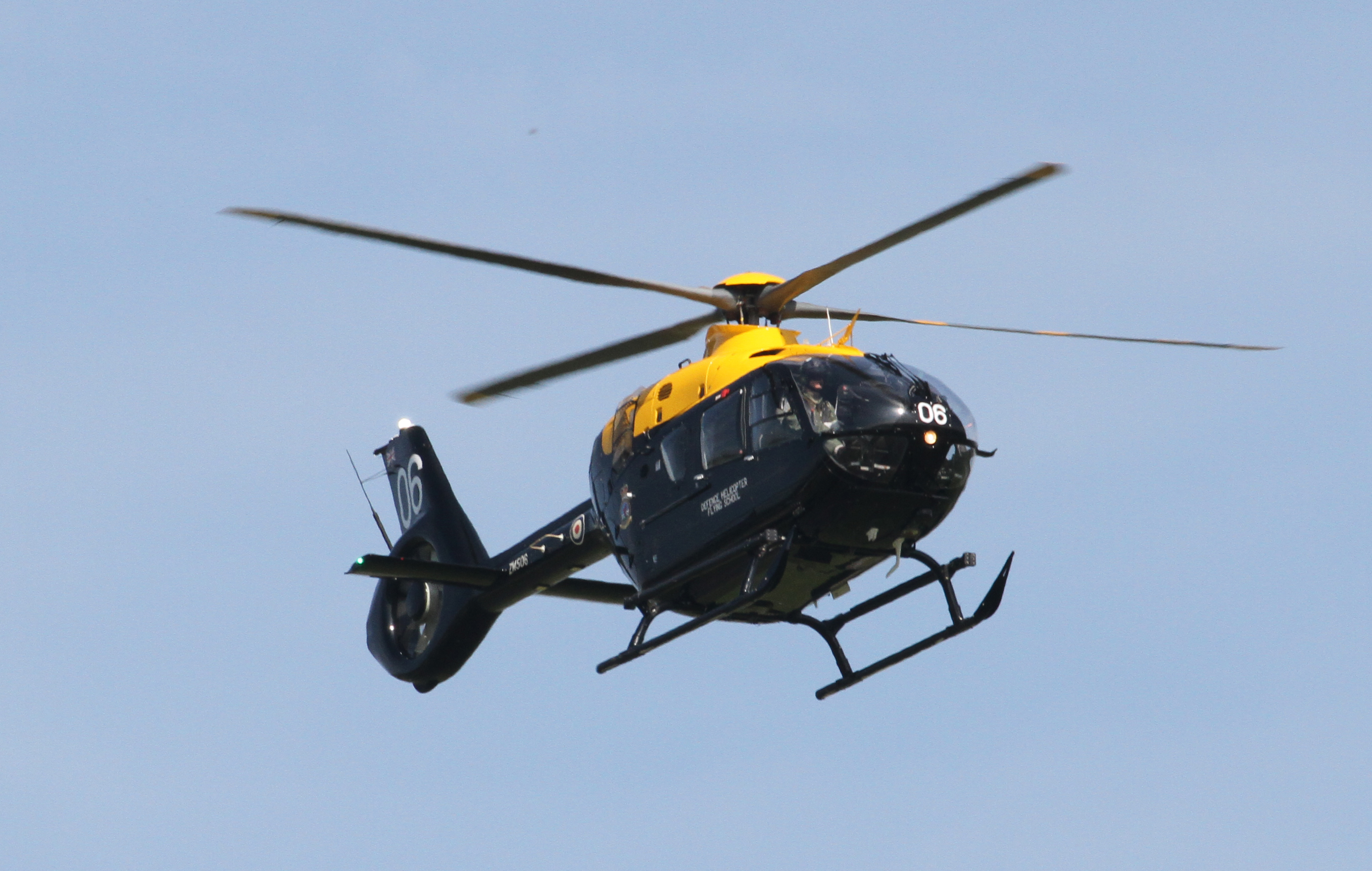
An Airbus H135 Juno of the Defence Helicopter Flying School.

In 2016, the Ministry of Defence selected Ascent Flight Training to deliver the UK Military Flying Training System (UKMFTS), a 25-year contract to provide fixed-wing elementary, basic, multi-engine and fast-jet pilot training, rear crew training and helicopter training to the UK military. Subsequently, as part of the Rotary Wing Training Programme, Ascent selected Airbus Helicopters to supply thirty-two helicopters to replace the DHFS Squirrel and Griffin aircraft. Airbus have provided twenty-nine H135 airframes, known as Juno HT1 and three H145 airframes, known as Jupiter HT1. Due to the reduced requirement for search and rescue (SAR) training, following the privatisation of SAR provision, only three of the larger H145 aircraft are required, compared to the larger number of Griffins which were operated. The new fleet is entirely twin-engine, replacing the single engine Squirrel, as nearly all helicopters now operated by the UK military are twin-engined, apart from the Gazelle AH1, which is due for retirement.

The first two Juno and a Jupiter were delivered to Shawbury on 3 April 2017. Deliveries continue throughout 2017 and early 2018, with the final Juno arriving on 24 May 2018. With the new aircraft achieving full training capability, Squirrel and Griffin operations ceasing on 1 April 2018 and the aircraft returned to their owners.

Other changes include the DHFS becoming a sub-unit of the Shawbury station headquarters, rather than an independent lodger unit, which it has been since in creation in 1997. Two wings were created, 2 Maritime Air Wing (2 MAW) and No. 9 Regiment.

In January 2020, the RAF announced that four additional Jupiter HT1 and further simulator would be acquired. The UKMFTS contract amendment worth £183 million is to create further rear crew training capacity. The additional aircraft and simulator were expected to be based at RAF Shawbury, where infrastructure will also be enhanced to accommodate extra students.

=== Renaming ===
The DHFS was renamed as No. 1 Flying Training School on 28 February 2020.

== Operations and training ==
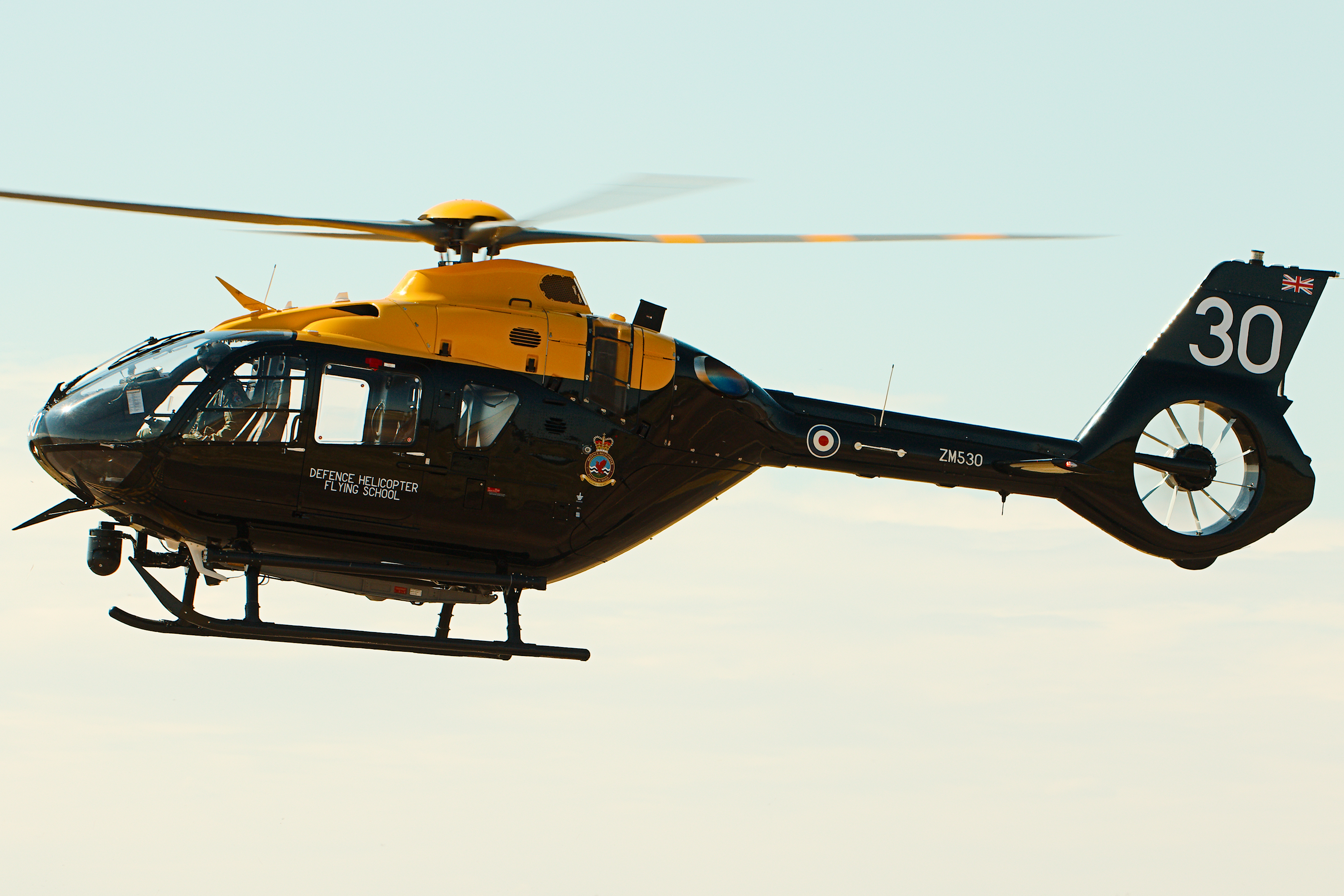
An Airbus H135 Juno of the Defence Helicopter Flying School used for Basic Rotary Training.

The DHFS trained all military helicopter crews for the Royal Air Force, Royal Navy's Fleet Air Arm and the British Army's Army Air Corps.

Under the UK Military Flying Training System, Airbus provided and maintained the Juno HT1 and Jupiter HT1 helicopters and Babcock and Lockheed Martin had contracts for infrastructure and ground Based Training Equipment. In 2016, DHFS had 161 instructors, 102 of which were military and 59 which were civilian. The school was expected to train 286 students per annum.

Four classes per annum went through Shawbury on six-month courses, two with 705 NAS and two with No. 660 Squadron AAC. During the initial course students were taught basic rotary-wing skills and emergency handling, including engine-off landings, leading to a first solo flight and a handling check. Students then developed their basic skills into more applied techniques such as non-procedural instrument flying, basic night flying, low-level and formation flying, mountain flying in Snowdonia and an introduction to winching for FAA students.

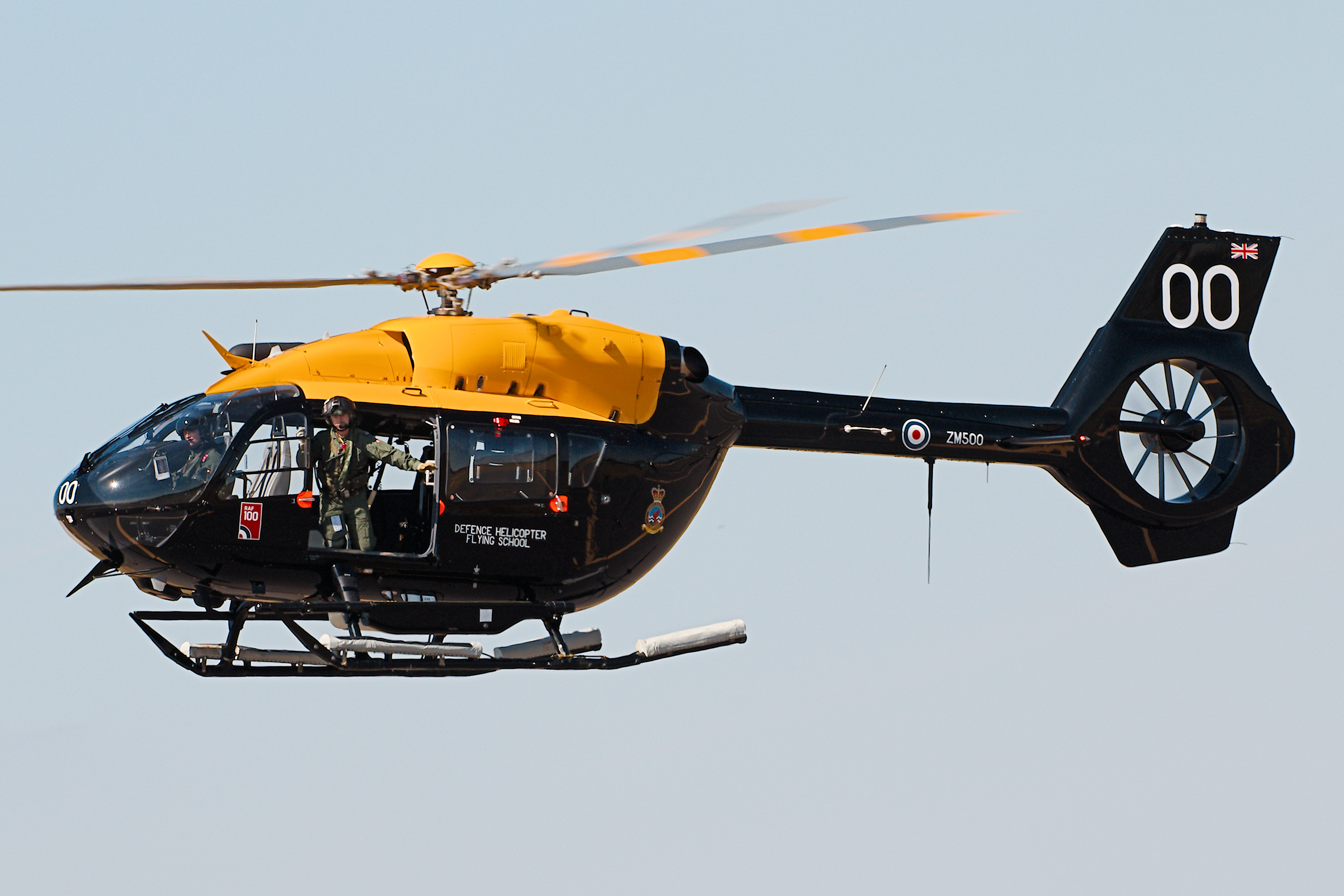
An Airbus H145 Jupiter of No. 202 Squadron RAF, Defence Helicopter Flying School.

Several other courses, sometimes bespoke, were available to British and international students.

As well as live flying, the training courses made use of synthetic training equipment, including full size replicas of the aircraft cockpit instruments, crewman cabin area and support helicopter passenger/freight loading and unloading space, within seven flying training devices (provided by CAE Inc.) and two virtual reality trainers and a mock Chinook cabin.

All aircrew instruction was carried out by Central Flying School (Helicopters) (CFS(H)) Instructors. These Instructors were a mix of military and civilian personnel.

The DHFS used grass airfields at Ternhill and Chetwynd for helicopter training, both located in Shropshire.

UK military rotary training continues under No.1 Flying Training School.

== Squadrons ==
Prior to being renamed in February 2020, the DHFS had the following structure.

Squadrons of the Defence Helicopter Flying School
Squadron	Service	Station	Aircraft	Role	Notes
2 Maritime Air Wing (2 MAW)
No. 660 Squadron	Army Air Corps	RAF Shawbury	Airbus Juno HT1	Basic helicopter flying training	Total : 29 in 2019
705 Naval Air Squadron	Fleet Air Arm	RAF Shawbury	Airbus Juno HT1	Basic helicopter flying training	Total : 29 in 2019
No. 202 Squadron	Royal Air Force	RAF Valley	Airbus Jupiter HT1	Maritime and mountain flying training	3 in 2019. Prepares RAF trainees as well as FAA trainees who are destined for the anti-submarine warfare Merlin or Wildcat.
9 Regiment Army Air Corps
No. 60 Squadron	Royal Air Force	RAF Shawbury	Airbus Juno HT1	Advanced helicopter flying training	Prepares RAF and some FAA trainees for their front-line aircraft types; Chinook, Puma and Commando Helicopter Force Merlin.
No. 670 Squadron	Army Air Corps	RAF Shawbury	Airbus Juno HT1	Advanced helicopter flying training	Prepares army trainees for their front-line aircraft; AH64E Apache, Wildcat AH1 or Dauphin II.

== Aircraft incidents ==
- A DHFS Squirrel helicopter crashed at Ternhill airfield in Shropshire on 14 December 2004. The solo pilot suffered a broken leg and other injuries.
- Two Squirrel helicopters of the DHFS collided at Ternhill airfield in Shropshire on 10 January 2007. One instructor was killed and three other aircraft occupants were injured.
- On 9 August 2016, a Bell Griffin HT1 caught fire after making an emergency landing on top of Yr Aran, Wales following a technical problem. All four crew exited safely.

== Notable graduates ==
- 1998 – Tim Peake (Astronaut), Army Air Corps.
- 2010 – Prince William, Duke of Cambridge, Royal Air Force.
- 2010 – Prince Harry, Duke of Sussex, Army Air Corps.

== See also ==
- List of Royal Air Force schools
- UK Military Flying Training System
