= RAF Shawbury =

Royal Air Force base in Shropshire, England

RAF Shawbury
- Near Shawbury, Shropshire in England
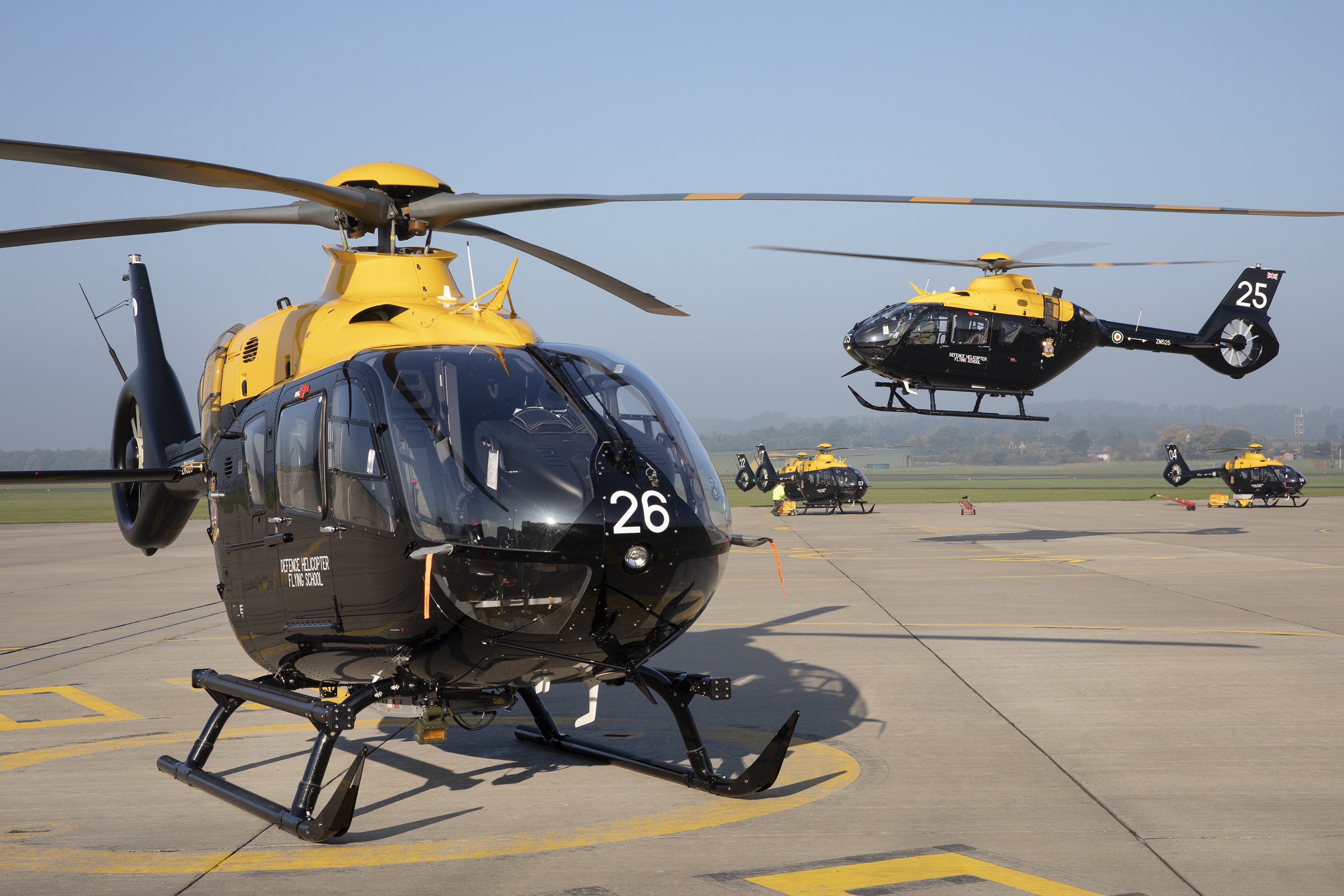
- Juno HT1 helicopters of No. 1 Flying Training School at RAF Shawbury.

- Doceo duco volo (Latin for 'I teach, I guide, I fly')

Site information
- Type: Training station
- Owner: Ministry of Defence
- Operator: Royal Air Force
- Controlled by: No. 22 Group (Training)
- Condition: Operational
- Website: www.raf.mod.uk/rafshawbury/

Location
- Shown within Shropshire
- Coordinates: 52°47′53″N 002°40′05″W
- Area: 313 hectares (770 acres)

Site history
- Built: 1916, rebuilt 1937
- In use: 1917–1918 (Royal Flying Corps); 1918–1920 (Royal Air Force); 1938 – present (Royal Air Force)

Garrison information
- Occupants: No. 1 Flying Training School; No. 60 Squadron (RAF); No. 660 Squadron (AAC); No. 670 Squadron (AAC); No. 705 Naval Air Squadron; Central Flying School (Helicopter) Squadron; Defence College of Air and Space Operations

Airfield information
- Identifiers: ICAO: EGOS, WMO: 03414
- Elevation: 75.5 metres (248 ft) AMSL
Runways
Direction	Length and surface
18/36	1,831 metres (6,007 ft) Asphalt and concrete
05/23	1,375 metres (4,511 ft) Asphalt and concrete
- Source: UK MIL AIP Shawbury

Royal Air Force Shawbury, otherwise known as RAF Shawbury, is a Royal Air Force station near the village of Shawbury in Shropshire in the West Midlands of England.

== History ==
=== The First World War ===
The station at Shawbury was first used for military flying training in 1917 by the Royal Flying Corps. No. 29 (Training) Wing formed on 1 September 1917 with three training squadrons, No. 10 Squadron, No. 29 (Australian) (Training) Squadron and No. 67 Squadron. Several different types of aircraft were operated which caused difficulties with training and maintenance. Two of the squadrons combined to form 9 Training Depot Station on 1 March 1918, the other moving to Gloucestershire. Training continued on a more organised basis until the end of the war.

The airfield closed in May 1920 when the strength of the RAF was drastically reduced. The hangars and other buildings were demolished and the land was returned to agricultural use.

=== The Second World War ===
In February 1938 the station was reactivated as a training establishment, firstly used by No. 11 Service Flying Training School and an Aircraft Storage Unit (ASU) which was operated by No. 27 Maintenance Unit. The airfield also had Relief Landing Grounds at RAF Bridleway Gate and RAF Bratton, with additional satellite landing grounds at RAF Hinstock, RAF Hodnet and RAF Weston Park.

Shawbury primarily prepared pilots for operational squadrons, with the main aircraft being the Airspeed Oxford. In 1944 it became the home of the Central Navigation School, which had moved from RAF Cranage in Cheshire, primarily concerned with improving the standard of air navigation in bombers.

=== Postwar ===
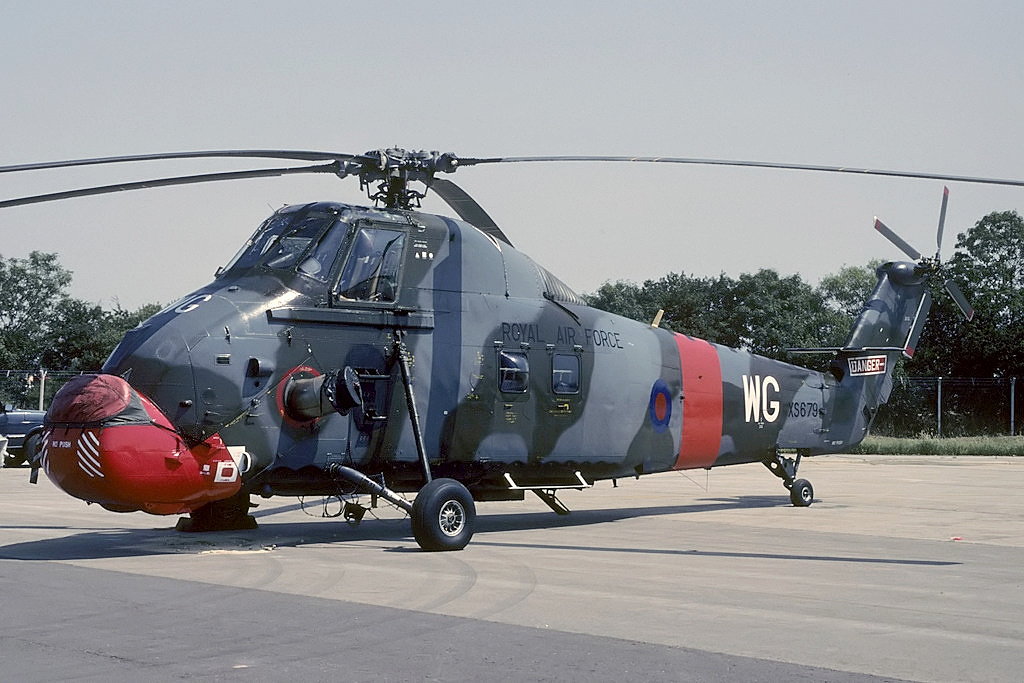
A Westland Wessex HC.2 of No. 2 Flying Training School which was based at RAF Shawbury between 1976 and 1997.

In 1950, the School of Air Traffic Control moved to Shawbury, combining to form the Central Navigation and Control School.

No. 27 Maintenance Unit continued its aircraft storage and scrapping work at Shawbury until disbandment in July 1972.

Shawbury became home to No. 2 Flying Training School in 1976, tasked with basic and advanced helicopter training and operating the Aerospatiale Gazelle and Westland Wessex in those roles respectively.

=== 1990s and 2000s ===
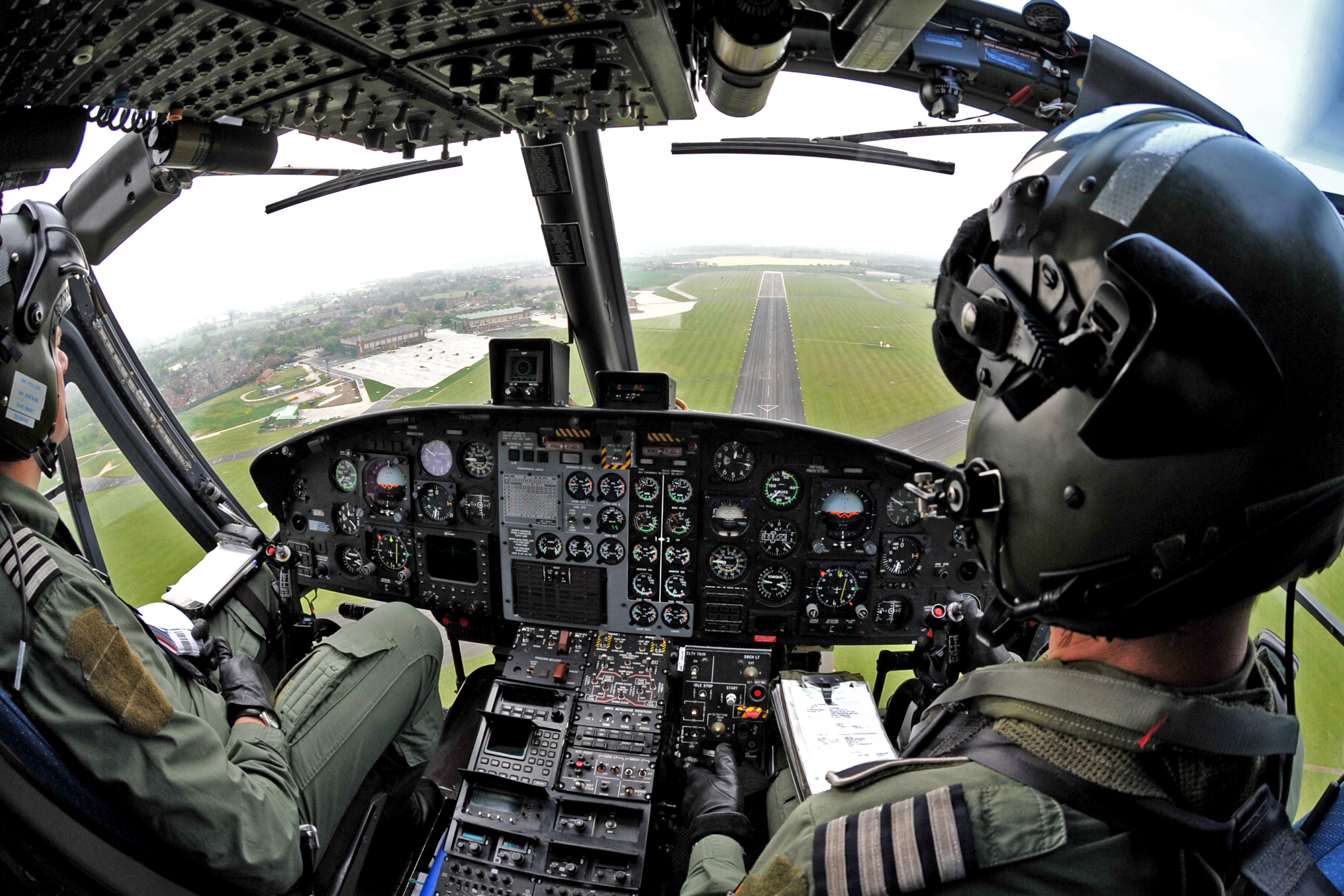
RAF Shawbury as seen from the cockpit of a Bell Griffin helicopter.

No. 2 Flying Training School was disbanded in March 1997 so that in April 1997 the station could start providing training of helicopter pilots for all three of the UK's armed services, under the newly formed Defence Helicopter Flying School.

Between 2001 and 2014 Shawbury was home to the Assault Glider Trust, a charity building a non-flying replica Horsa glider for museum display.

The station's physical recreation training centre, named the Jubilee Hall Sports and Fitness Centre to mark the Diamond Jubilee of Elizabeth II, was opened by Prince Michael of Kent on 24 April 2012.

In April 2016 the Central Air Traffic Control School (CATCS) was renamed the School of Air Operations Control (SAOC) and came under the control of the newly created Defence College of Air and Space Operations.

=== Transition to Juno ===
In 2016, the Ministry of Defence selected Ascent Flight Training to deliver the UK Military Flying Training System (UKMFTS), a 25-year contract to provide fixed-wing elementary, basic, multi-engine and fast-jet pilot training, rear crew training and helicopter training to the UK military. Subsequently, Ascent selected Airbus Helicopters to supply thirty-two helicopters to replace the DHFS Squirrel and Griffin aircraft. Airbus provided twenty-nine H135 airframes, known as Juno HT1 and three H145 airframes, known as Jupiter HT1. Due to the reduced requirement for search and rescue (SAR) training, following the privatisation of SAR provision, only three of the larger H145 aircraft are required, compared to the larger number of Griffins which were operated. The new fleet is entirely twin-engine, replacing the single engine Squirrel, as nearly all helicopters now operated by the UK military are twin-engined, apart from the Gazelle AH1, which is due for retirement.

During 2016 and 2017, refurbishment of existing and construction of new buildings was undertaken as part of the contract. The work was undertaken by Kier Construction and included a new training school building, including space for flight simulators and refurbishment of hangars.

The first two Juno and a Jupiter were delivered to Shawbury on 3 April 2017. Deliveries continue throughout 2017 and early 2018, with the final Juno arriving on 24 May 2018. With the new aircraft achieving full training capability, Squirrel and Griffin operations ceased on 1 April 2018 and the aircraft returned to civilian use.

Other changes included the DHFS becoming a sub-unit of the Shawbury station headquarters, rather than an independent lodger unit, which it had been since in creation in 1997. Two wings were created, 2 Maritime Air Wing (2 MAW) and No. 9 Regiment.

The School of Aerospace Battle Management, part of the Defence College of Air and Space Operations, moved to Shawbury from RAF Boulmer in Northumberland in August 2019.

DHFS was re-badged as No. 1 Flying Training School during February 2020 and continues to provide helicopter training the British armed forces.

== Role and operations ==
RAF Shawbury's mission statement is "To provide a safe, efficient, and effective airfield base environment; to enable and support, commanded, lodged and parented units; and to deliver wider Defence and RAF tasks as directed".

The station is home to the School of Air Operations Control.

=== No.1 Flying Training School ===
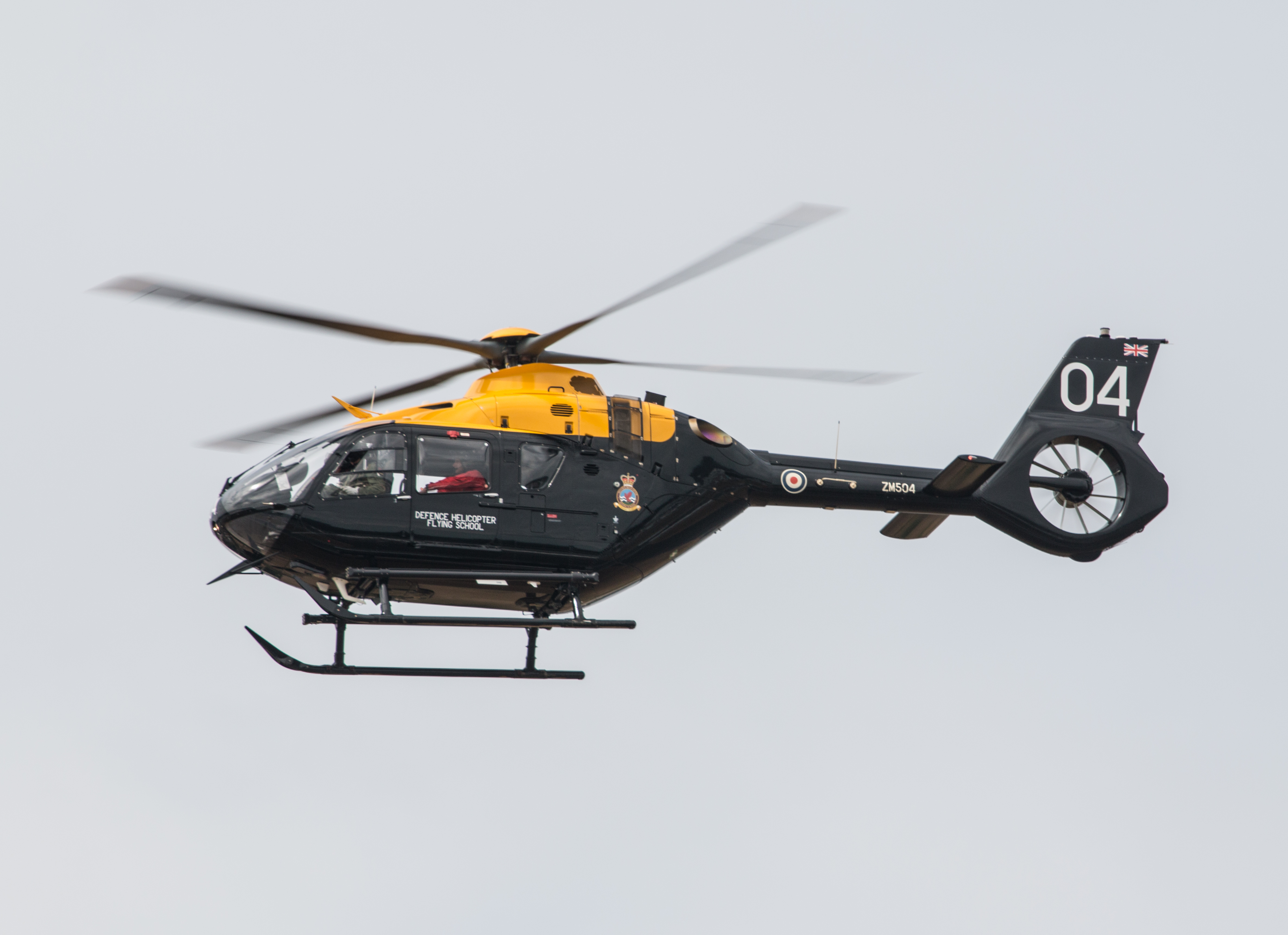
An Airbus Juno HT1 of No.1 Flying Training School.

No. 1 Flying Training School (No. 1 FTS) (formerly the Defence Helicopter Flying School) provides basic helicopter pilot training for the RAF, Royal Navy and Army Air Corps (AAC), as well as foreign and commonwealth countries, using twenty-nine Airbus Juno HT1. No. 1 FTS comprises two main elements, 2 Maritime Air Wing (2 MAW) and No. 9 Regiment. 2 MAW includes No. 660 Squadron of the AAC and 705 Naval Air Squadron and provide basic helicopter flying training. No. 9 Regiment comprises No. 60 Squadron of the RAF and No. 670 Squadron of the AAC in the advanced helicopter flying training. No. 202 Squadron is also part of No. 1 FTS and operates the Airbus Jupiter HT1 at RAF Valley in Wales.

Airbus provides and maintains the helicopters and Babcock and Lockheed Martin have contracts for infrastructure and ground Based Training Equipment. No. has 161 instructors, 102 of which are military and 59 which are civilian. The school is expected to train 286 students per annum.

Four classes per annum year go through Shawbury on six-month Basic Rotary courses, two with 705 NAS and two with No. 660 Squadron AAC. During the initial course students are taught basic rotary-wing skills and emergency handling, including engine-off landings, leading to a first solo flight and a handling check. Students then develop their basic skills into more applied techniques such as non-procedural instrument flying, basic night flying, low-level and formation flying, mountain flying in Snowdonia and an introduction to winching for FAA students, in the advanced phase lasting 8 months.

=== Central Flying School (Helicopter) Squadron ===
The RAF Central Flying School (Helicopter) Squadron provides Qualified Helicopter Instructor and Qualified Helicopter Crewman Instructor (QHI/QHCI) training for Juno and Jupiter. The unit trains crews from all three UK armed services as well as foreign air arms.

=== School of Aerospace Battle Management ===
The School of Aerospace Battle Management, part of the Defence College of Airspace Control, moved to Shawbury from RAF Boulmer in Northumberland in August 2019.

Formerly called the School of Fighter Control (SFC), it was located at RAF Boulmer from 1990 to 2019. Commanded by a Wing Commander, the School of Fighter Control was formed in 1946 and Her Majesty Queen Elizabeth II awarded the Unit its own badge in 1958, which includes a Torch and Pointer. The school's motto is 'Disce ut Dirigas' which freely translates to 'Learn in order that you may guide.

=== Aircraft Maintenance and Storage Unit ===
Several RAF aircraft types are stored in long-term reserve at RAF Shawbury. These aircraft are stored in four specially de-humidified hangars at different states of readiness and can be brought back into active service if required. Other aircraft types which are no longer required for operational service are also stored pending their disposal. The unit is operated by FB Heliservices, part of Cobham.

== Based Units ==
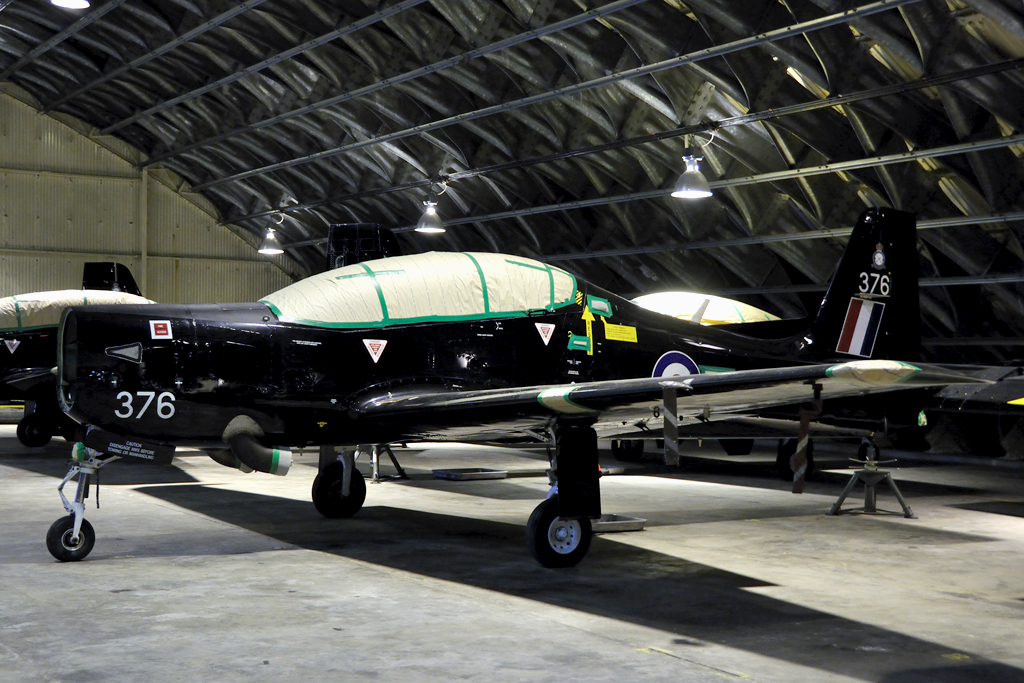
A RAF Shorts Tucano T1 in storage at RAF Shawbury.

Flying and notable non-flying units based at RAF Shawbury.

=== Royal Air Force ===
- Aircraft Maintenance and Storage Unit (operated by FB Heliservices)

No. 22 Group (Training) RAF

- No. 1 Flying Training School
  - 2 Maritime Air Wing (2 MAW)
    - No. 660 Squadron (Army Air Corps) – Airbus Juno HT1
    - No. 705 Naval Air Squadron (Fleet Air Arm) – Airbus Juno HT1
  - No. 9 Regiment
    - No. 60 Squadron (RAF) – Airbus Juno HT1
    - No. 670 Squadron (Army Air Corps) – Airbus Juno HT1
- Defence College of Air and Space Operations
  - School of Air Operations Control
  - School of Aerospace Battle Management
- Central Flying School
  - Central Flying School (Helicopter) Squadron

== Future ==
=== Ministry of Defence personnel relocation ===
It was announced by the Ministry of Defence (MOD) in November 2016 that MOD staff currently based at 1300 Parkway in Bristol would be relocated to Shawbury by 2020.

=== No. 1 Flying School expansion ===
In January 2020, the RAF announced that four additional Jupiter HT1 and further simulator would be acquired for No.1 Flying Training School. The UKMFTS contract amendment worth £183 million is to create further rear crew training capacity. The additional aircraft and simulator are expected to be based at RAF Shawbury, where infrastructure will also be enhanced to accommodate extra students.

== See also ==
- List of Royal Air Force stations
