= Grob G 120TP =

Two-seat turboprop training and aerobatic low-wing aircraft

G 120TP
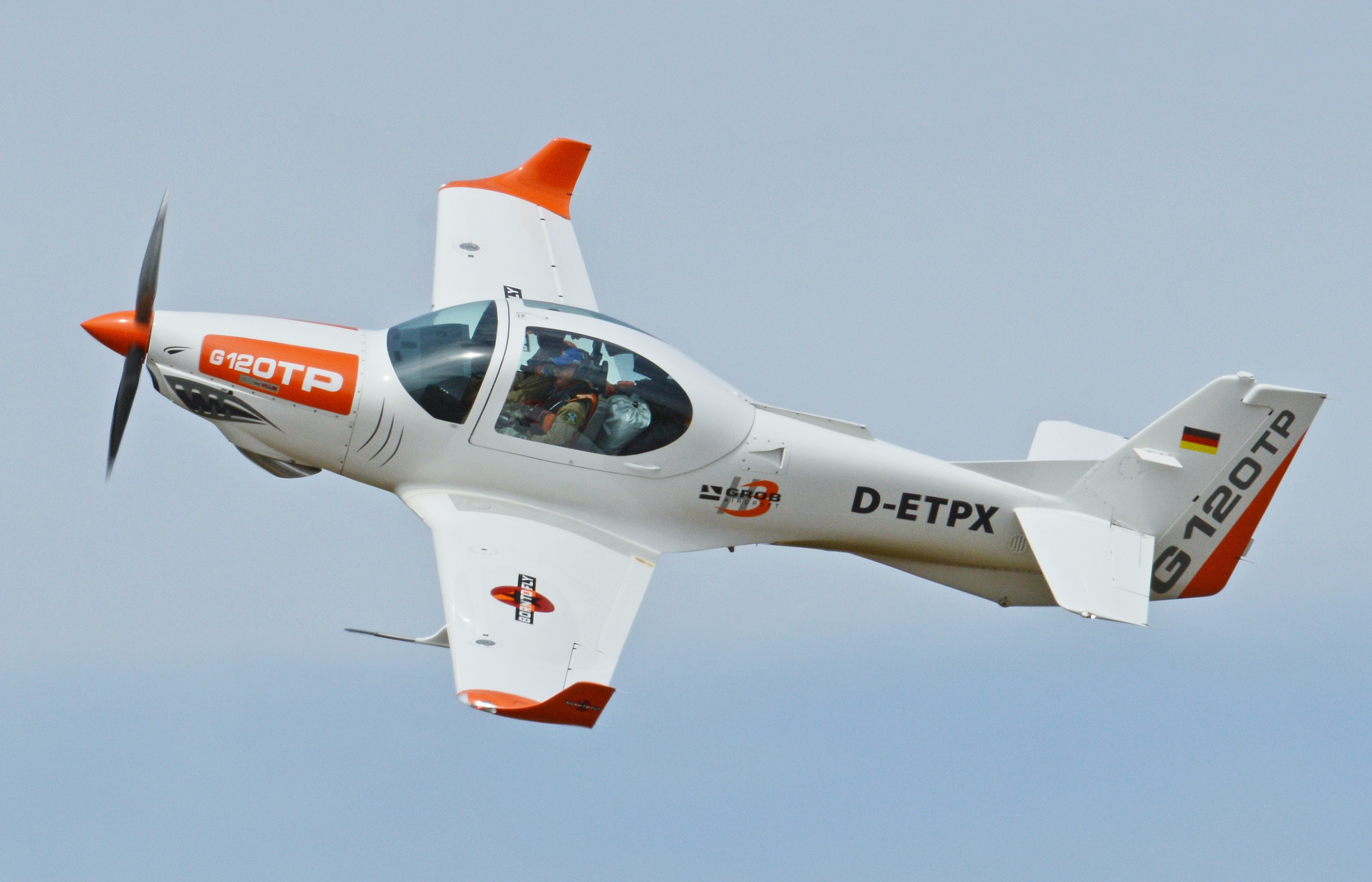
- Grob G 120TP

General information
- Type: Trainer
- National origin: Germany
- Manufacturer: Grob Aircraft
- Status: In production
- Primary users: Indonesian Air Force Mexican Air Force; Bangladesh Air Force; UK Military Flying Training System; Swedish Air Force

History
- Manufactured: 2010-present
- Introduction date: 2013
- First flight: 2010
- Developed from: Grob G 120

The Grob G 120TP is a two-seat turboprop training and aerobatic low-wing aircraft with a composite airframe, built by Grob Aircraft. It is based on the Grob G 120A training aircraft and has been developed for military and civil pilots training. It has a retractable tricycle landing gear and a low tailplane.

The first customer was the Indonesian Air Force. EASA Part 23 type certification was completed in May 2013.

== Design and development ==
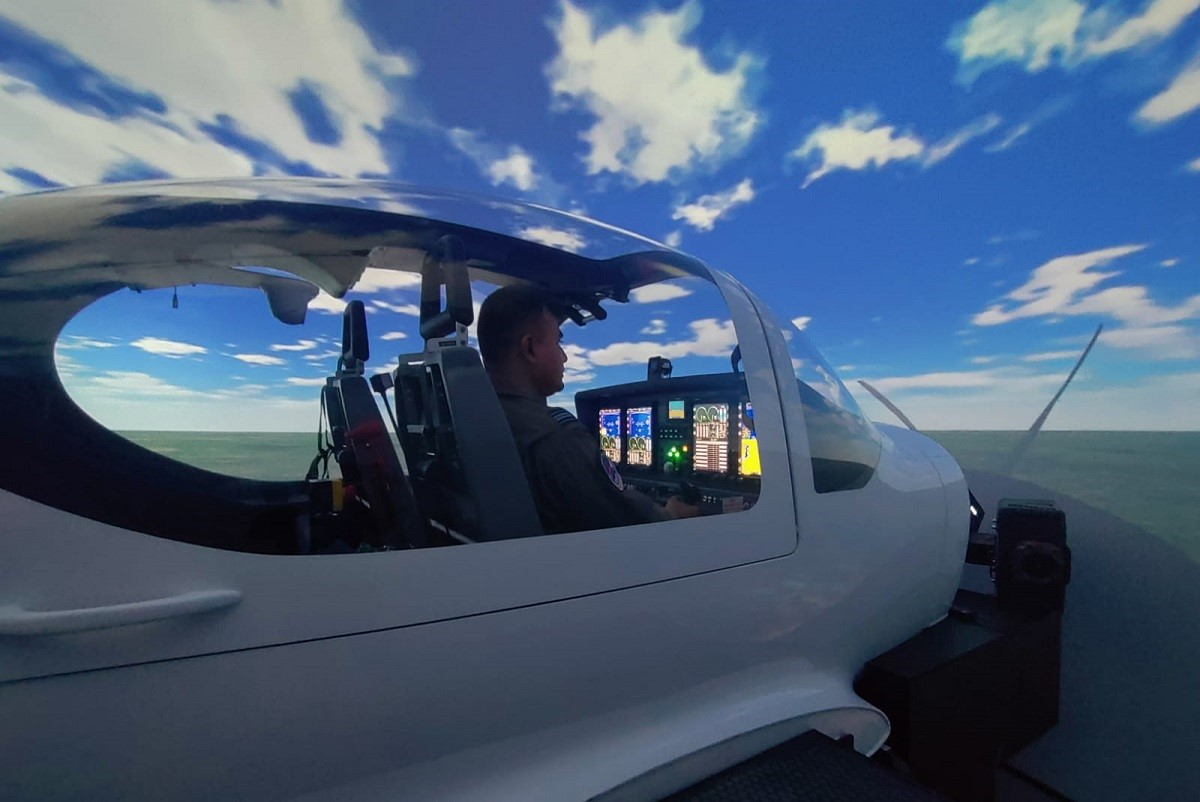
A G 120TP simulator at Bangladesh Air Force Academy

Designed to be a further development of the G 120A, the G 120TP turned during the development process into a nearly new type of aircraft. Due to the new powertrain, the G 120TP offers new capabilities for basic and advanced pilot training, where it can be used as a lead-in for a jet trainer.

The airframe is made of fiberglass reinforced plastic and is stressed to +6/-4g. The wings are made of carbon fibre composites with winglets.

The cockpit provides room for students and teachers wearing military equipment and helmets. The HOTAS control system is similar to that found in other types of aircraft that students may fly later in their careers. Therefore, basic and advanced flight training for future transport aircraft, helicopter, or jet pilots will be possible. The cockpit is equipped with movable seats, or optionally, the new Martin-Baker Mk.17 lightweight ejection seats. The instrument panel can be equipped with a 4-screen Genesys Aerosystems IDU-680 EFIS. An autopilot and air conditioning system are available, as well as an oxygen system and second thrust lever.

== Operators ==
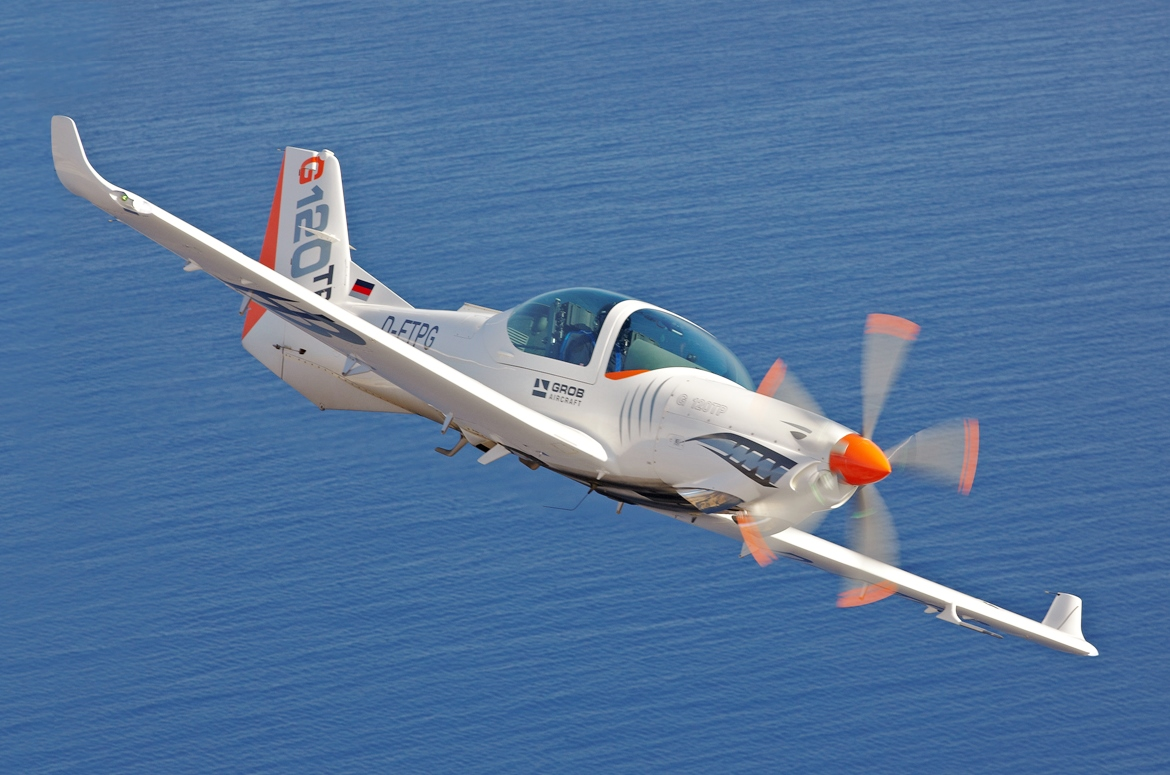
G 120TP in flight

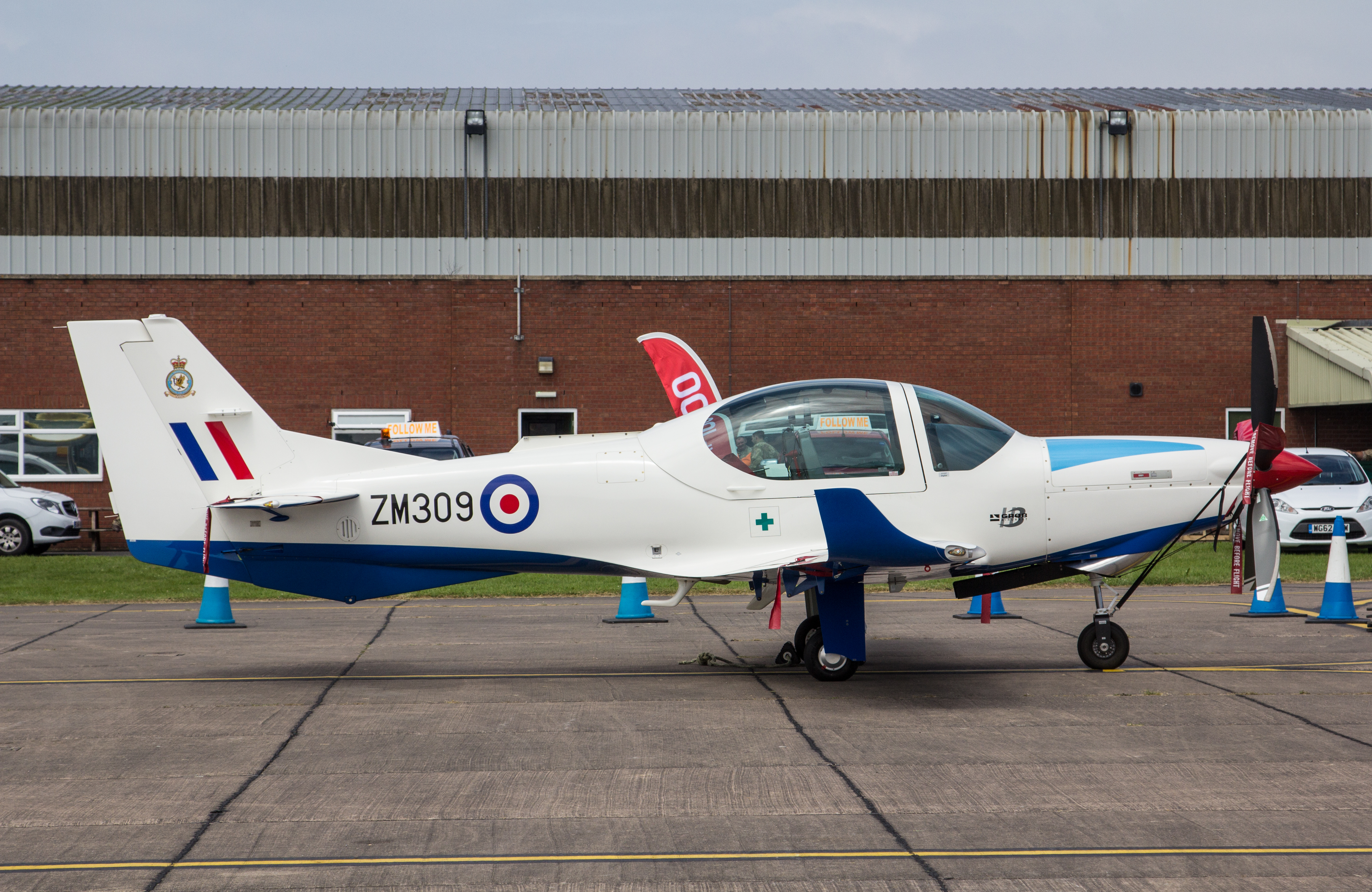
Grob Prefect T1 at RAF Cosford in 2018

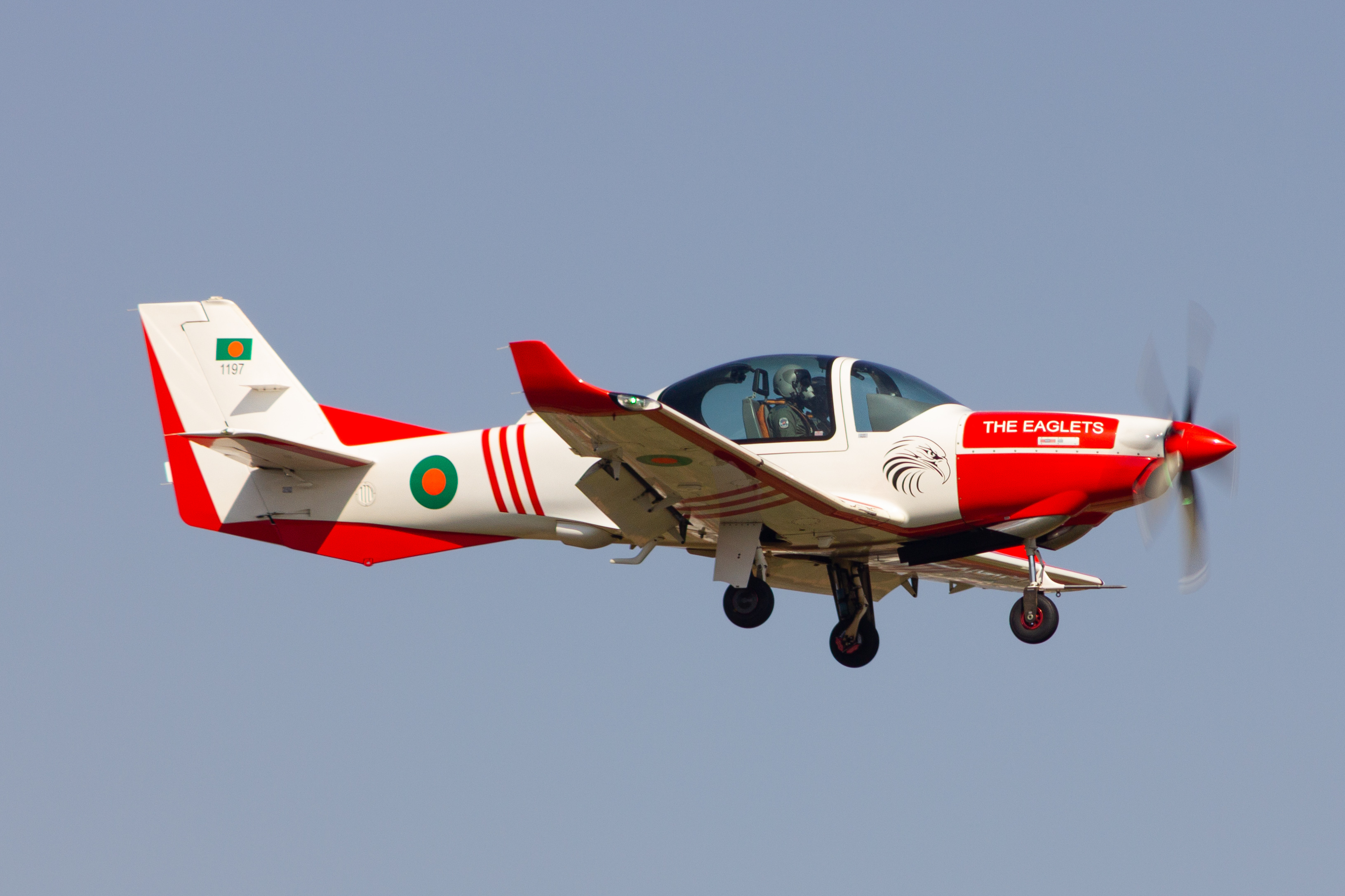
Bangladesh Air Force Grob G 120TP

Argentina

- Argentine Air Force

Argentina is the second operator of the G 120TP. Deliveries of the first batch of four aircraft started in June 2013, with a total delivery of 10 aircraft(+5).
Bangladesh

- Bangladesh Air Force

Ordered 24 in June 2021. Under the deal, Grob Aircraft will also build a fiberglass reinforced plastic and carbon fibre composite repair workshop and a propeller repair workshop in Bangladesh. On 15 December 2021, the Bangladesh Air Force received the first 12 Grob G-120TPs, from Germany. Full delivery has been completed in 2022. Operated by 12 squadron "The Eaglets" at Bangladesh Air Force Academy
Canada

- Royal Canadian Air Force

Dubbed the CT-102B Astra II in Canadian service, the aircraft will be used for basic flying training at 15 Wing Moose Jaw. 23 of the aircraft have been ordered with deliveries to begin in September 2025. Registered in DND service, the aircraft will be loaned to SkyAlyne as the operator and flying training provider.
Ecuador

- Ecuadorian Air Force

Ecuadorian Air Force is an operator of the G 120TP. Deliveries of the aircraft started in 2019, with a total of eight aircraft.
Ethiopia

- Ethiopian Air Force

The Ethiopian Air Force operates a total of six G 120TP that were all acquired in 2020.
Germany

- German Air Force

The German Air Force have chosen four G 120TPs to train its air force pilots at the Phoenix-Goodyear airport, Arizona.
Indonesia

- Indonesian Air Force

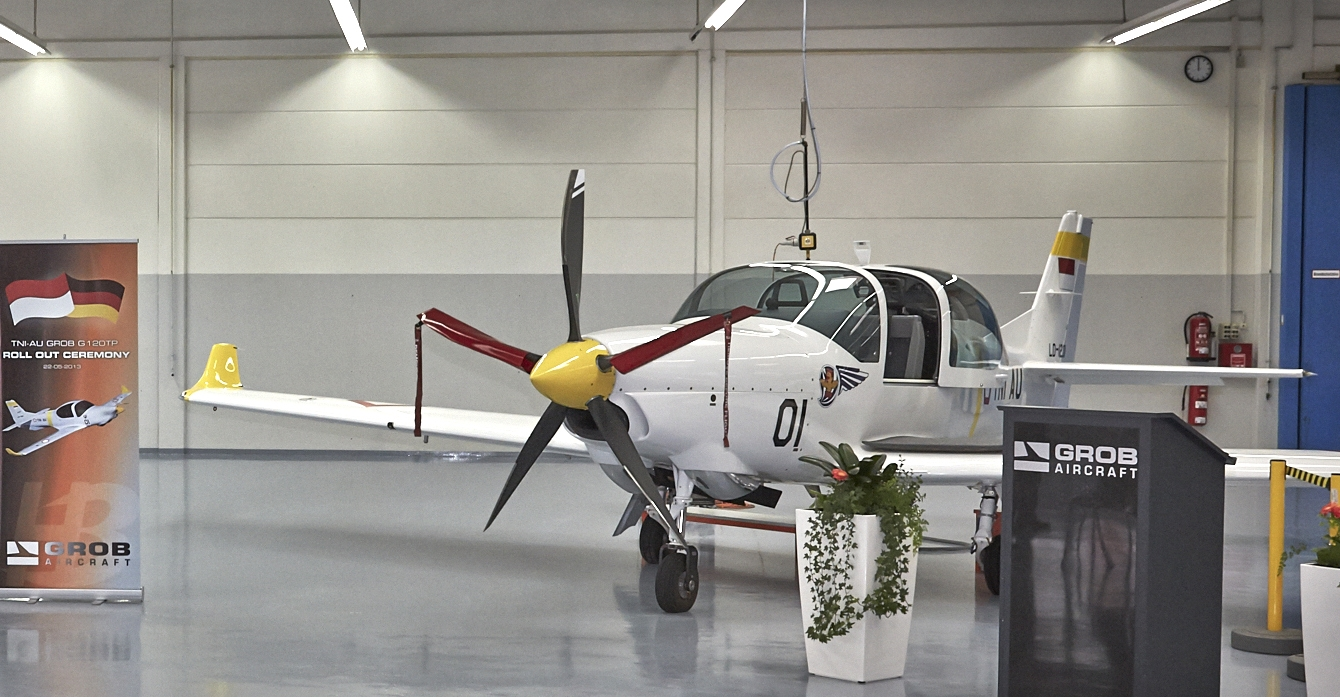
Ceremonial handover of the first 4 G 120TP to the Indonesian Air Force

The launch customer for the G 120TP was the Indonesian Air Force, which operates a fleet of 30 aircraft, as well as a G 120TP – Flight Training Device.
Jordan

- Royal Jordanian Air Force

The Royal Jordanian Air Force (RJAF) awarded Grob Aircraft an order to supply 14 aircraft, among which one CBT System and one G 120TP FTD for elementary pilot training. The aircraft entered service in April 2017. Around that same time, Grob confirmed it had delivered 12 of the 14 ordered aircraft. In January 2018, the Bundeswehr announced it had donated two aircraft to Jordan.
Kenya

- Kenya Air Force

The Kenya Air Force operates a fleet of nine G 120TP training aircraft.
Mexico

- Mexican Air Force

The Mexican Air Force (FAM) has selected the Grob G 120TP as its new elementary trainer. The contract contains 25 aircraft (+15) equipped with the Genesys Aerosytems EFIS IDU-680. The delivery of the first batch was in February 2015 and the final batch in February 2016. The training will be completed by a Computer Based Training (CBT) System and four G 120TP Flight Training Devices.
Myanmar

- Myanmar Air Force

The Myanmar Air Force operates a fleet of 20 G 120TP (+10) training aircraft equipped with Genesys Aerosystems EFIS IDU-680. The pilot training will be supported by a CBT System and one G 120TP FTD.
Sweden

- Swedish Air Force

In 2021, the Swedish Air Force selected the Grob G 120 TP as its new Basic Trainer Aircraft, designated SK 40 (Trainer Aircraft type 40). Ten aircraft and a simulator are on order, with delivery expected in 2022 and service starting in 2023. The first three aircraft were delivered on 3 April 2023. An additional order for three more aircraft was announced in October 2024.
United Kingdom

- UK Military Flying Training System

The MFTS provides tri-service Elementary Flying Training to British military pilots on a fleet of 23 G 120TPs named the Grob Prefect T1.
The system replaces separate flying fixed-wing and rotary training programs for the Royal Air Force, Royal Navy and Army Air Corps. The service provider Ascent uses the G 120TP together with the Beechcraft T-6 and the Grob Tutor to provide initial, basic and advanced training.
United States
United States Army

== Specifications ==
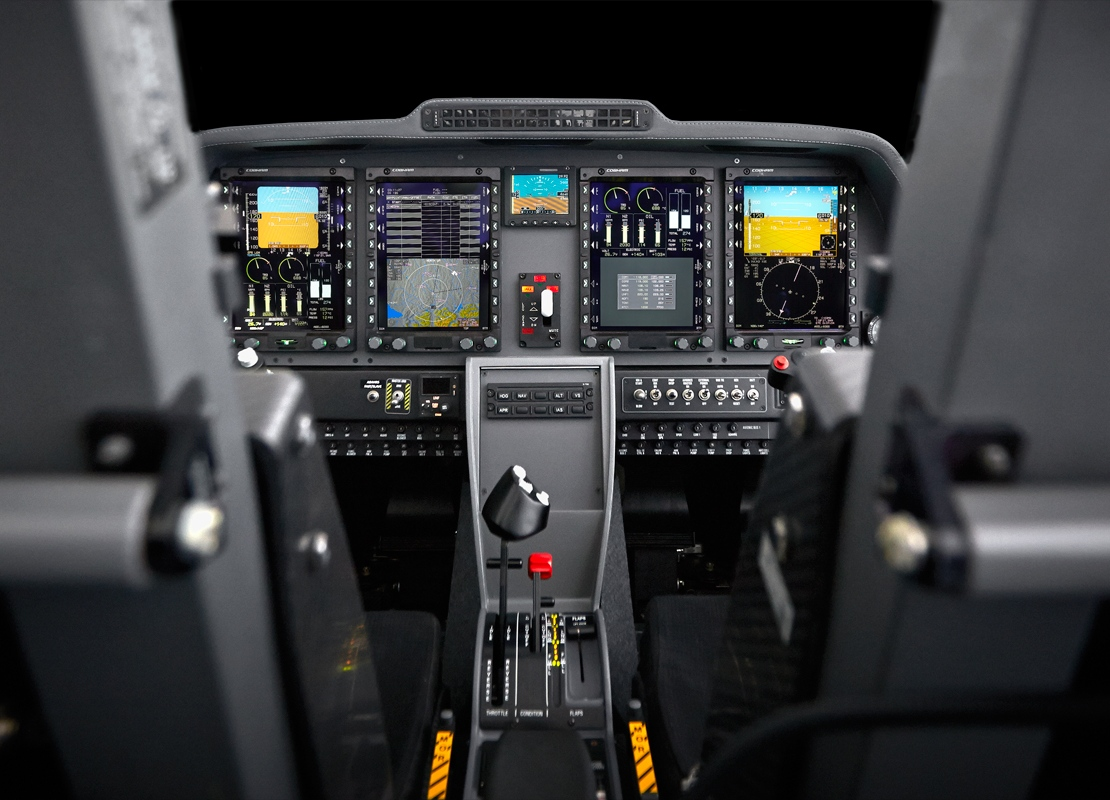
The digital cockpit of the G 120TP consists of 4 EFIS Cobham/Chelton Flight Systems IDU-680.

Data from Grob

General characteristics

- Crew: two
- Length: 8.4 m (27 ft 7 in)
- Wingspan: 10.3 m (33 ft 10 in)
- Height: 2.7 m (8 ft 10 in)
- Wing area: 13.5 m^{2} (145 sq ft)
- Empty weight: 1,095 kg (2,414 lb)
- Max takeoff weight: 1,590 kg (3,505 lb)
- Fuel capacity: 360 litres (79 imp gal; 95 US gal)
- Powerplant: 1 × Rolls-Royce M250-B17F Turboprop aircraft engine, 340 kW (456 hp)
- Propellers: 5-bladed MT Propeller, 2.1 m (6 ft 11 in) diameter

Performance

- Maximum speed: 454 km/h (282 mph, 245 kn)
- Cruise speed: 435 km/h (270 mph, 235 kn) (at MCP, 10,000 ft)
- Stall speed: 107 km/h (67 mph, 58 kn) (MSL, landing configuration)
- Range: 1,070 km (670 mi, 580 nmi) at 5,000 ft and 75% power
- Ferry range: 1,361 km (846 mi, 735 nmi) at 10,000 ft and 45% power
- Endurance: 6 hours at 10,000 ft and maximum endurance power setting
- Service ceiling: 7,600 m (25,000 ft)
- g limits: +6/-4G
- Rate of climb: 14.08 m/s (2,772 ft/min)

== See also ==
Related development

- Grob G 115
- Grob G 120

Aircraft of comparable role, configuration, and era

- Calidus B-250
- Diamond DART 450
- Fuji T-5
- Fuji T-7
- HAL HTT-40
- KAI KT-1 Woongbi
- Pilatus PC-7
- PZL-130 Orlik
- RFB Fantrainer
- SIAI-Marchetti SF.260
- TAI Hürkuş
