= Assault Glider Trust =

English charity

- Founded: 2001
- Registration no.: 1088895
- Location: RAF Shawbury, Shropshire, England

The Assault Glider Trust is a registered charity established in 2001 and based at RAF Shawbury in Shropshire, England.

The trust was formed by veterans of the Glider Pilot Regiment Association. Current projects of the trust are to convert a Dakota to its original parachute and glider tug function, along with restoring or building an Airspeed Horsa, an American CG-4A Waco and a De Havilland Tiger Moth.

In 2001, RAF Shawbury offered a home for the construction of the aircraft. BAE Systems found the original working drawings for a Horsa glider and allowed these to be used for the project under the condition that any aircraft produced would not be flown.
