= No. 670 Squadron AAC =

Flying squadron of the British Army's Army Air Corps

No. 670 Squadron AAC No. 670 Squadron RAF
- Active: 16 November 1944 – 1 July 1946 (RAF); 1989 - present
- Country: United Kingdom
- Branch: British Army
- Role: Training squadron
- Part of: 9 Regiment, Army Air Corps
- Garrison/HQ: RAF Shawbury

No. 670 Squadron AAC is a squadron of the British Army's Army Air Corps. It is responsible for the Operational Conversion Phase of the Army Pilots’ Course. The Squadron is based at RAF Shawbury.

It was formerly No. 670 Squadron RAF, a glider squadron of the Royal Air Force active during the Second World War as part of No. 229 Group RAF, South East Asia Command

== History ==
No. 670 Squadron RAF was formed at Fatehjang, Punjab, (then) British India on 14 December 1944 as a glider squadron, with the intention of being used for airborne operations by South East Asia Command. It continued to train, as part of No. 343 Wing RAF, until the surrender of Japan, when it became surplus to requirements. The squadron was disbanded on 1 July 1946 at Chaklala, Punjab, British India.

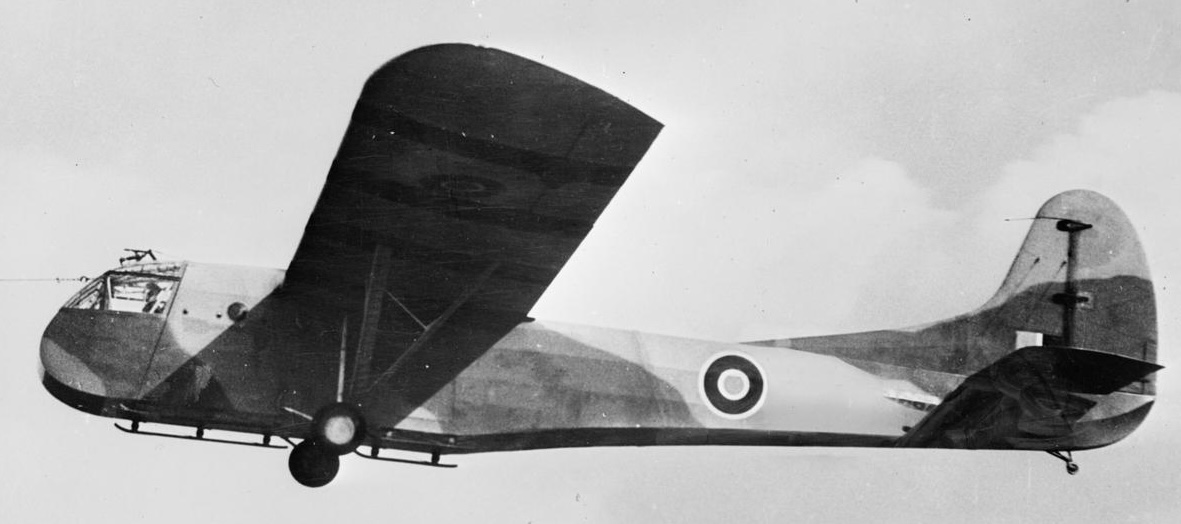
A Waco CG-4 (Hadrian) in British service.

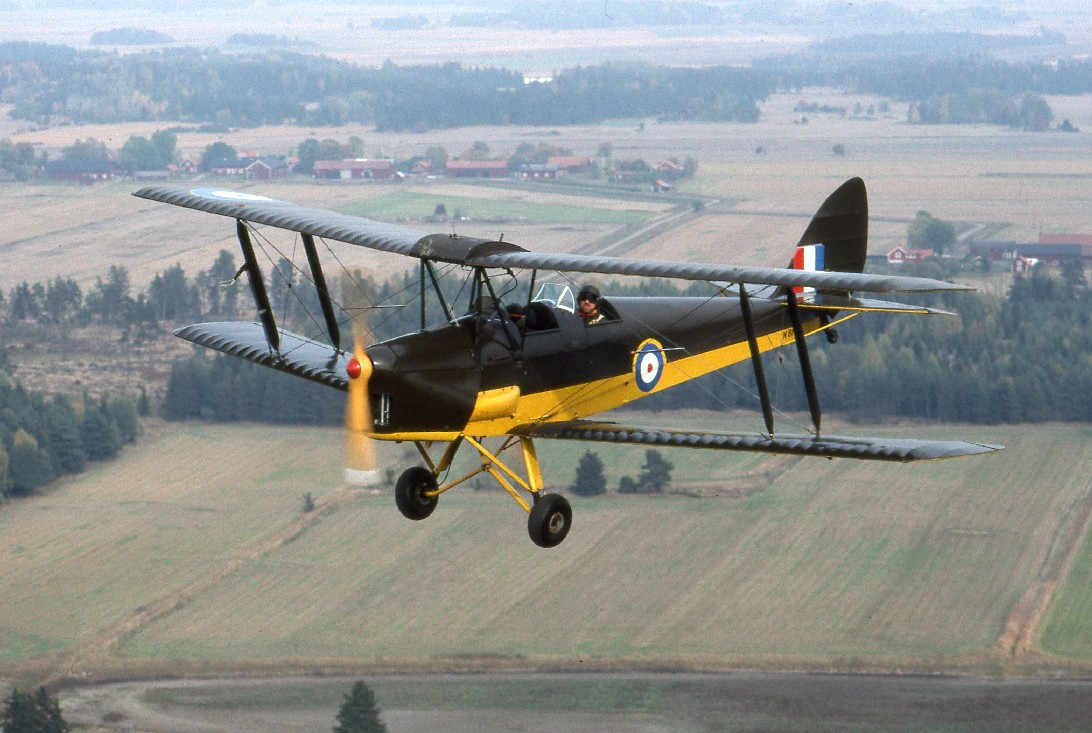
A de Havilland Tiger Moth restored in wartime colours.

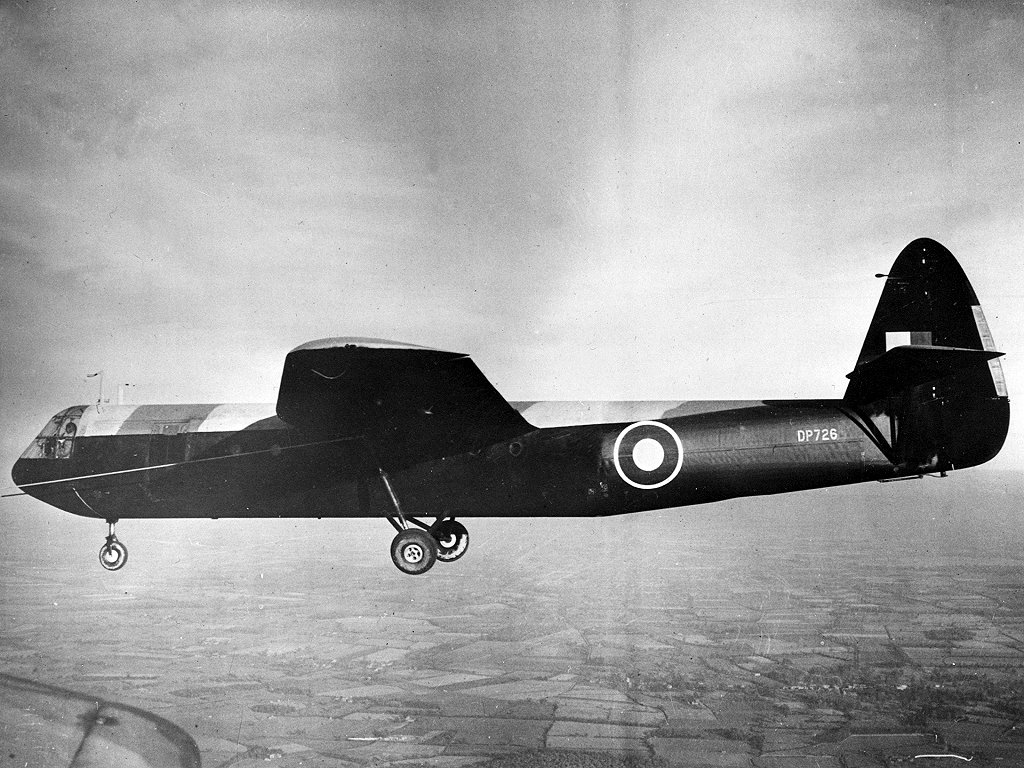
An Airspeed Horsa under tow.

Aircraft operated by no. 670 Squadron RAF, data from
From	To	Aircraft	Version
January 1945	June 1945	Hadrian	
July 1945	July 1946	de Havilland Tiger Moth	Mk.II
December 1945	June 1946	Airspeed Horsa	

Bases and airfields used by no. 670 Squadron RAF, data from
From	To	Base
14 December 1944	30 May 1945	Fatehjang, Punjab, British India
30 May 1945	1 June 1945	Dhamial, Punjab, British India
1 June 1945	23 June 1945	Basal, Punjab, British India
23 June 1945	26 July 1945	Upper Topa Camp, Punjab, British India
26 July 1945	1 April 1946	Fatehjang, Punjab, British India
1 April 1946	1 July 1946	Chaklala, Punjab, British India

== Army Air Corps ==
No. 670 Squadron AAC was formed during 1989 at Middle Wallop Airfield as part of 2 Regiment AAC (Training) performing Advanced rotary wing training with the Eurocopter Squirrel HT.2. It moved to 7 Regiment AAC (Flying) on 1 April 2009.

== See also ==
- Ascent Flight Training
- List of Army Air Corps aircraft units (United Kingdom)
