= No. 663 Squadron =

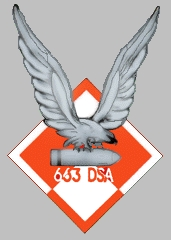
- Badge of 663rd Polish Air Observation Post Squadron during World War II
- Active: 14 August 1944 – 29 October 1946; 1 July 1949 – 10 March 1957
- Country: United Kingdom
- Allegiance: (Poland) Polish government in exile (1944–1946)
- Branch: Royal Air Force
- Role: Air observation post squadron
- Motto(s): We fly for the guns

Insignia
- Squadron Badge heraldry: An Eagle displayed holding a snaffle bit (1949–1957)
- Squadron Codes: ROC (July 1949 – April 1951)

Aircraft flown
- Reconnaissance: Auster single-engined Army liaison monoplane

No. 663 Squadron (Polish: 663 Polski Szwadron Powietrznych Punktów Obserwacyjnych) was an air observation post (AOP) unit, manned with Polish Army personnel, which was officially formed in Italy on 14 August 1944. Numbers 651 to 663 Squadrons were air observation post units working closely with British Army units in artillery spotting and liaison. A further three of these squadrons, 664–666, were manned with Canadian personnel. Their duties and squadron numbers were transferred to the Army with the formation of the Army Air Corps on 1 September 1957.

== History ==
=== Formation and wartime history ===
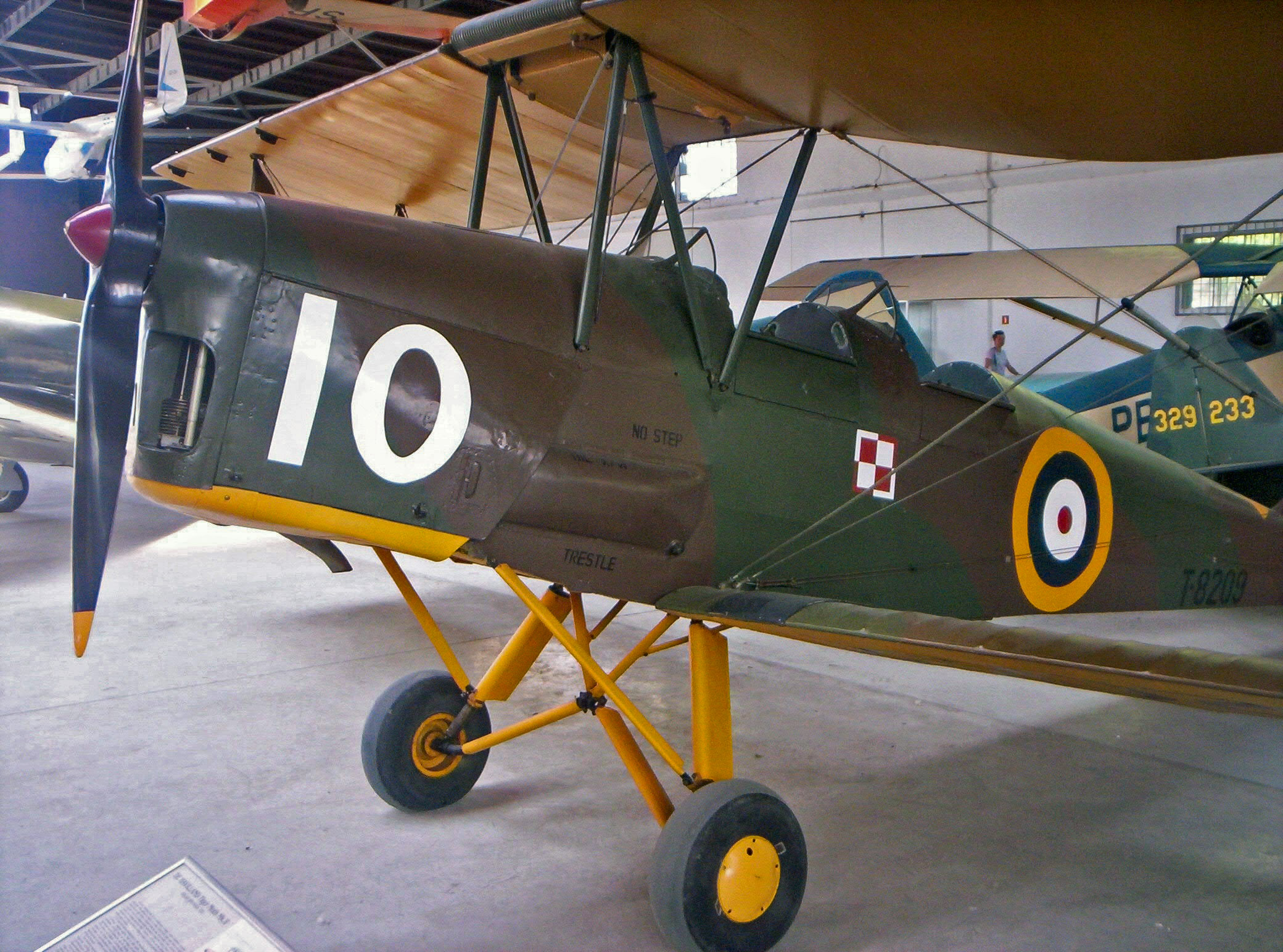
De Havilland 82A Tiger Moth II in Polish Aviation Museum

Volunteer Polish Army officers had been sent by ship to South Africa in June 1944 for initial training as pilots and then for operational training in the very low-level AOP role. The squadron was officially formed at San Basilio in Italy on 14 August 1944 as 663 Polski Szwadron Powietrznych Punktów Obserwacyjnych. The fifteen successful officers reached Italy on 28 October. All squadron personnel were drawn from Polish artillery units. The squadron's primary role was to observe enemy ground targets and to help direct artillery fire on them. After further advanced training, the squadron was declared operational on 30 January 1945. The squadron's HQ was at Villa Carpena, with three flights, two of which were detached elsewhere as needed to support No. 2 Polish Corps artillery units on the progressing "front line". Auster AOP IV and V "spotter" aircraft were flown in the unit's close support operations. After meritorious service with some pilots being killed, the unit left for the UK on 10 October 1946 and was formally disbanded on 29 October 1946.

=== Post-war service ===
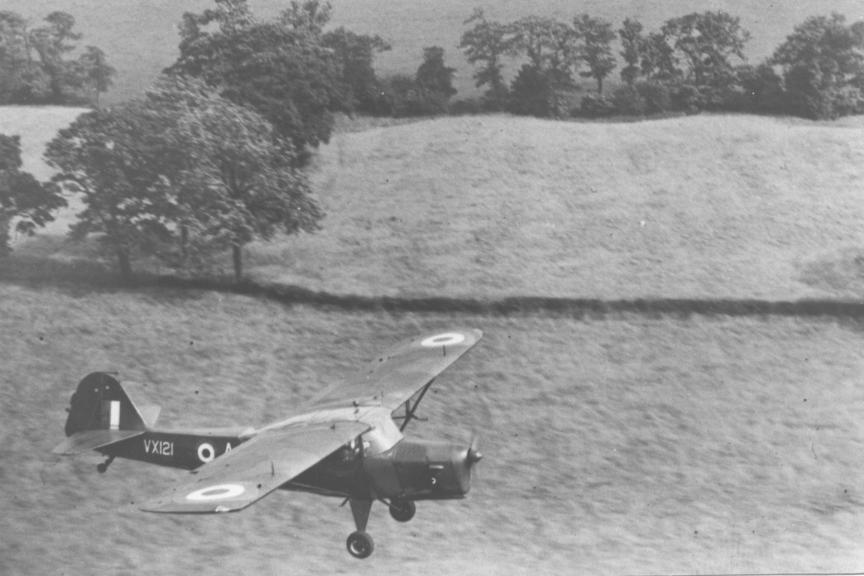
663 (AOP) Squadron Auster AOP.6 VX121 'A' 'low flying for the guns' over Cheshire in 1954

No. 663 Squadron was reformed on 1 July 1949 as an AOP unit of the Royal Auxiliary Air Force equipped with Taylorcraft Auster Vs and Auster AOP.6 & T.7s. de Havilland Canada DHC-1 Chipmunk T.10 aircraft were used for training and proficiency flights. The squadron headquarters was at RAF Hooton Park, Wirral, Cheshire with dispersed flights at RAF Ringway, RAF Llandow, South Wales, and Wolverhampton (Pendeford) – the latter flight moving on to Castle Bromwich Aerodrome near Birmingham. For the next eight years, No. 663 flew very low-level 'spotting' sorties in co-operation with Territorial Army artillery units, often based for the weekend in a friendly farmers field – for example near Tarporley, Cheshire.

No. 1952 Reserve Air Observation Post Flight was formed within 663 Squadron along with No. 1953 Reserve Air Observation Post Flight, No. 1954 Reserve Air Observation Post Flight and No. 1955 Reserve Air Observation Post Flight.

The squadron disbanded on 10 March 1957, at the same time as all other Royal Auxiliary Air Force flying units.

=== Army Air Corps history and operations ===
The unit was reformed as an army air unit called 663 Aviation Squadron in October 1969 at Netheravon, Wiltshire. Its allocated mission was to support army formations in the Salisbury Plain area. The unit's initial equipment was the Bell Sioux AH.1 helicopter, with these being later replaced by the Westland Scout AH.1 turbine helicopter. On 1 January 1973 the unit was renamed No. 663 Squadron AAC. The Squadron again disbanded in July 1977.

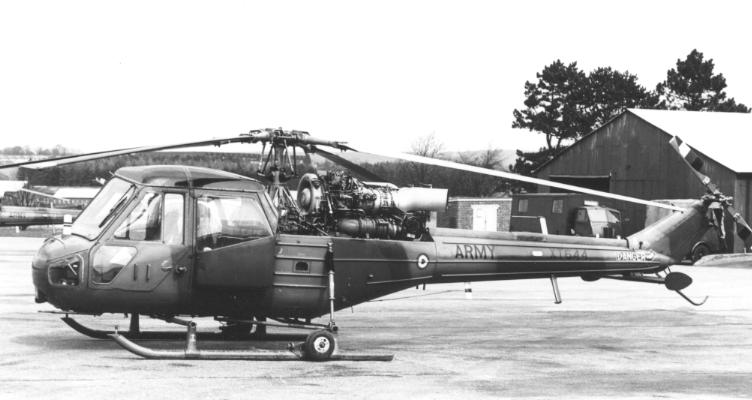
663 Squadron AAC Westland Scout AH.1 in 1969

Following a restructuring of Army Air Squadrons, 660 Squadron was redesignated as 663 Squadron, part of 3 Regiment Army Air Corps. From 1993 it has been based at the AAC Wattisham near Stowmarket, Suffolk. In recent years it has replaced its Westland Gazelles with Westland-assembled Boeing AH-64 Apache attack helicopters.

== Aircraft operated ==
Aircraft operated by no. 663 Squadron RAF, data from
From	To	Aircraft	Variant
October 1944	February 1946	Auster	IV
November 1944	February 1946	Auster	V
July 1949	October 1951	Auster	V
July 1949	February 1957	Auster	AOP.6
1955	1957	Chipmunk	T.10
