= No. 660 Squadron AAC =

Flying squadron of the British Army's Army Air Corps

No. 660 Squadron AAC No. 660 Aviation Squadron AAC No. 660 Squadron RAF
- Active: 31 July 1943 – 31 May 1946 (RAF); 1969–1978; 1978–1994; 1 November 1997 – present
- Country: United Kingdom
- Branch: (United Kingdom) Army Air Corps
- Base: RAF Shawbury

Aircraft flown
- Helicopter: Current: Airbus Helicopter Juno HT1; Former: Eurocopter Squirrel HT.1; Westland Gazelle AH.1; Westland Scout AH.1; Westland Sioux AH.1 (Westland-Agusta-Bell 47G-3B1)

No. 660 Squadron AAC (660 Sqn) is a squadron of the British Army's Army Air Corps (AAC). It was formerly No. 660 Squadron RAF, a Royal Air Force air observation post squadron associated with the 21st Army Group during the Second World War. Numbers 651 to 663 Squadrons of the RAF were air observation post units working closely with British Army units in artillery spotting and liaison. A further three of these squadrons, 664–666, were composed of Canadian personnel. Their duties and squadron numbers were transferred to the Army with the formation of the Army Air Corps on 1 September 1957.

In the late 1950s the squadron's numerical was transferred to the AAC and since its formation in 1969, it has operated as a British Army unit flying various types of battlefield helicopters. The squadron has been re-formed and disbanded on a number of occasions. The squadron is currently based at RAF Shawbury where it forms part of No. 1 Flying Training School RAF, but it has been deployed operationally to Northern Ireland, Hong Kong and Brunei throughout its existence.

== History ==
=== Royal Air Force ===
No. 660 Squadron was formed at RAF Old Sarum on 31 July 1943 with the Taylorcraft Auster III and in February 1944 the Auster IV. From November 1943, it was based at Hammerwood Park, a country house in Sussex. However, as the squadron's role was to support the Second British Army, in July 1944 it moved to France. Fighting in the break-out from Normandy, it followed the army across the low countries and into Germany. The squadron disbanded at Holtenau, Germany on 31 May 1946.

Its identification symbol was BG (August 1945 – April 1946).

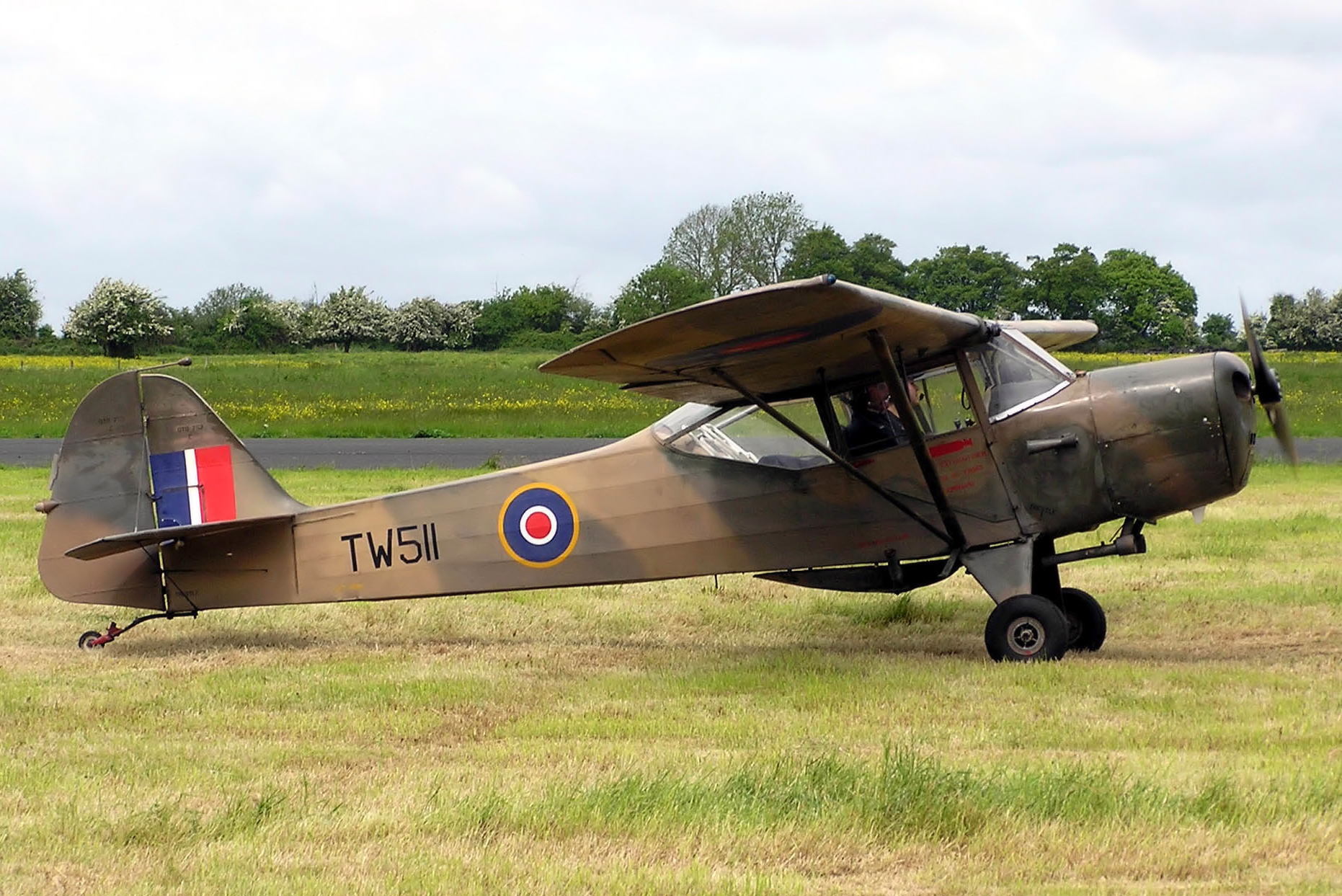
A postwar Auster Mk.V, restored in wartime colours.

Aircraft operated by No. 660 Squadron RAF, data from
| From | To | Aircraft | Variant |
|---|---|---|---|
| July 1943 | February 1944 | Auster | Mk.III |
| February 1944 | May 1946 | Auster | Mk.IV |
| September 1944 | May 1946 | Auster | Mk.V |

=== Army Air Corps ===
The squadron's numerical designation was first used by No. 660 Squadron RAF, a Royal Air Force squadron which served from 31 July 1943 until 31 May 1946 operating from bases in England, France and Germany. Its duties and squadron number were transferred to the AAC upon the corps' formation on 1 September 1957. No. 660 Sqn was subsequently re-formed in October 1969 adopting the designation of No. 660 Aviation Squadron AAC. Based at Topcliffe and equipped with Westland (Agusta-Bell) Sioux AH.1 and Westland Scout AH.1s, it formed part of 2 Regiment Army Air Corps (2 Regt. AAC).

The squadron moved to Salamanca Barracks, at Soest-Bad Sassendorf Airfield in 1971, becoming part of 4 Regt AAC the following year. In January 1973, it was renamed 660 Squadron AAC and in May 1974, while at Salamanca Barracks, it was the first unit to receive the Westland Gazelle AH.1 for operational service in May 1974. A Scout Flight was later swapped with No. 654 Squadron AAC in October 1977, making it an entirely Gazelle squadron. The squadron was then assigned to 3 Regt. AAC.

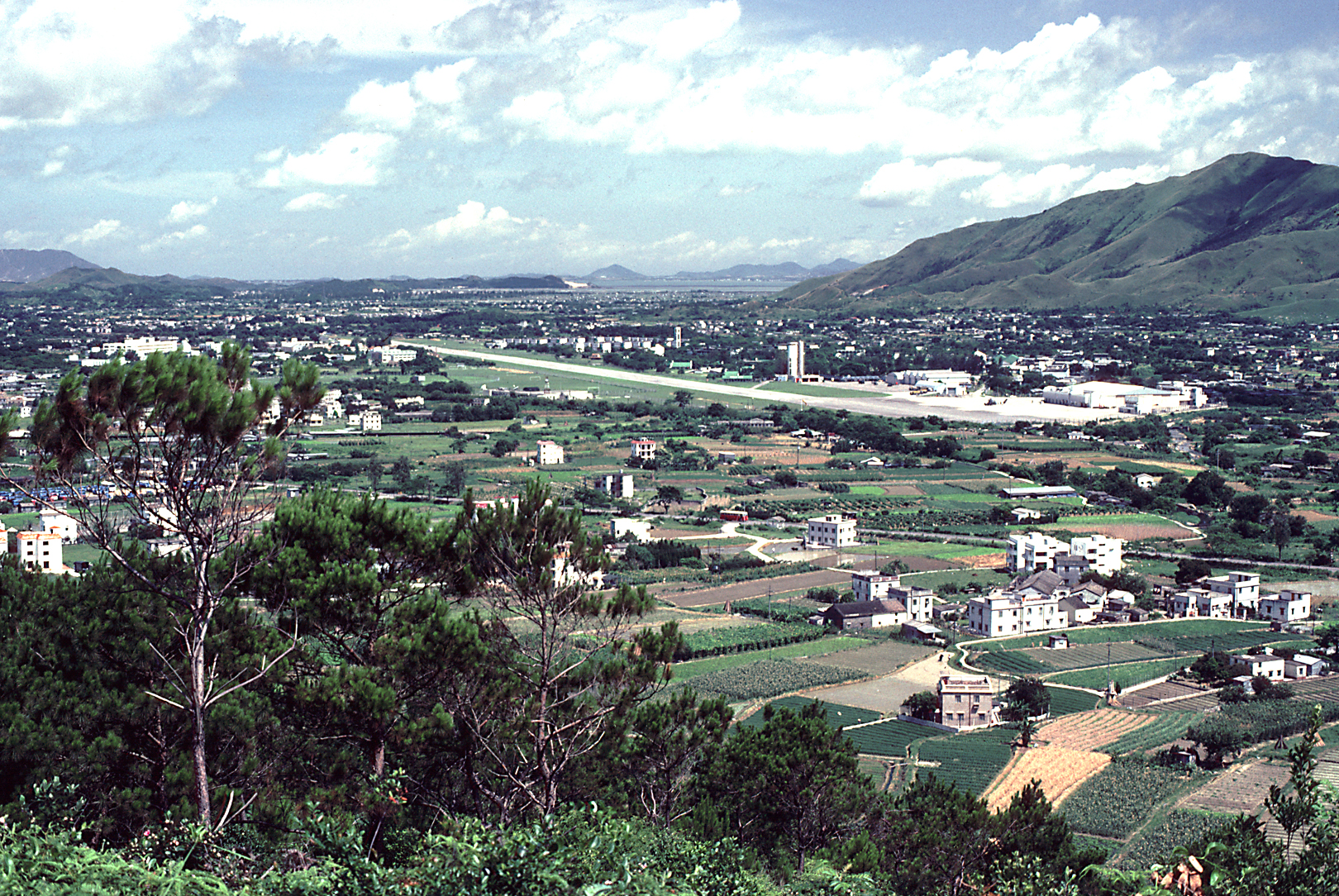
RAF Sek Kong airfield, New Territories, Hong Kong in 1983

On 1 April 1978, the squadron was re-designated as No. 663 Squadron AAC (663 Sqn), and its personnel and equipment were transferred to the new squadron which was based at Salamanca Barracks. Later that same year, No. 660 Squadron was re-formed at Sek Kong in Hong Kong equipped with the Scout AH.1. Its roles included observation/reconnaissance and providing a troop-lift capability on the Hong Kong–Chinese border. It also provided anti-smuggling and immigration-control capabilities and supported Army exercises, being heavily involved in stemming the flood of illegal-immigrants from the People's Republic of China (PRC). In 1984, the squadron had a complement of 12 Scouts and 80 men; of these, two Scouts and 18 men were based at Seria in Brunei.

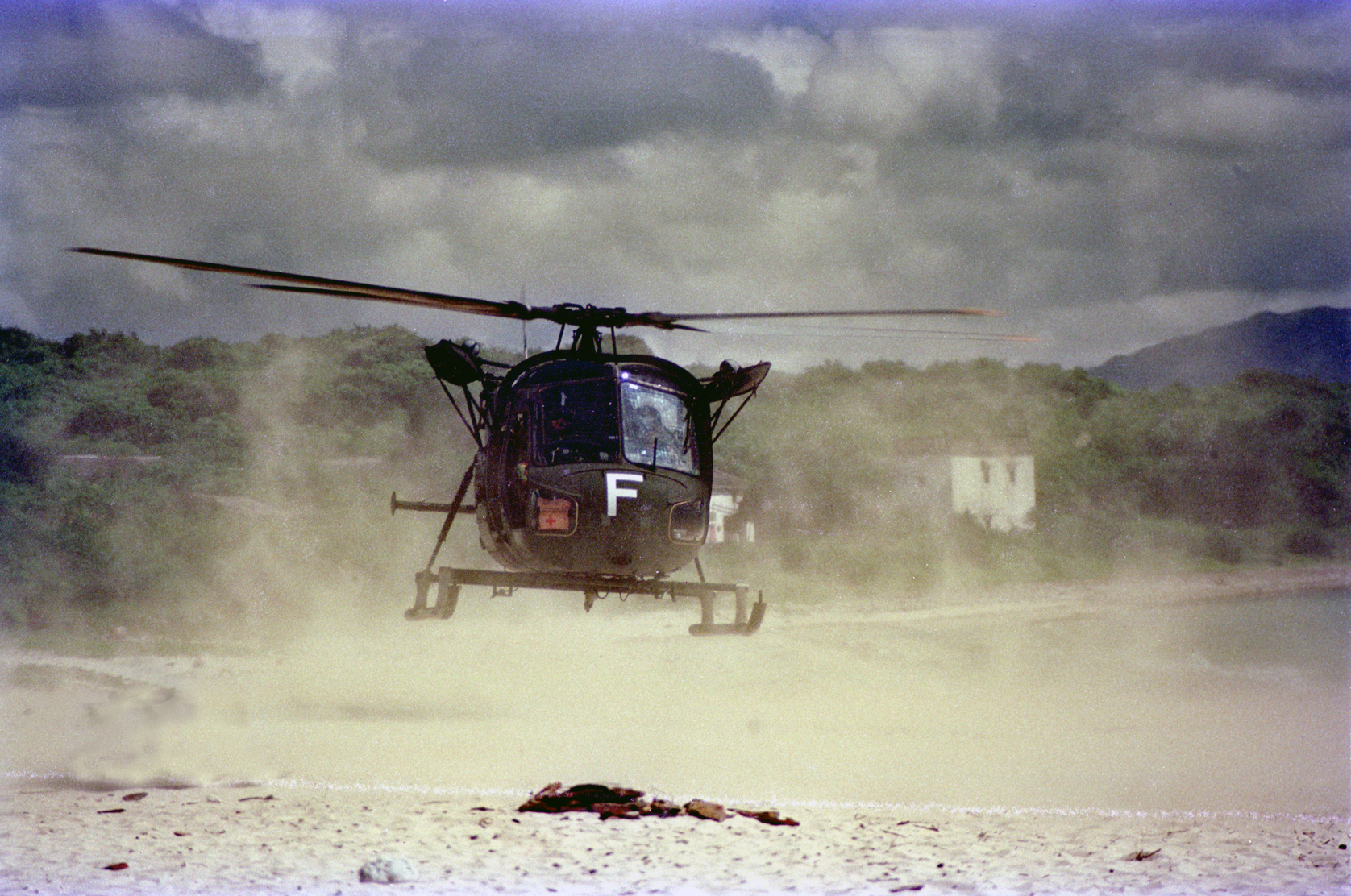
660 Sqn AAC Scout landing at Ping-Chau Island, on exercise from RAF Sek Kong/Shek Kong Airfield

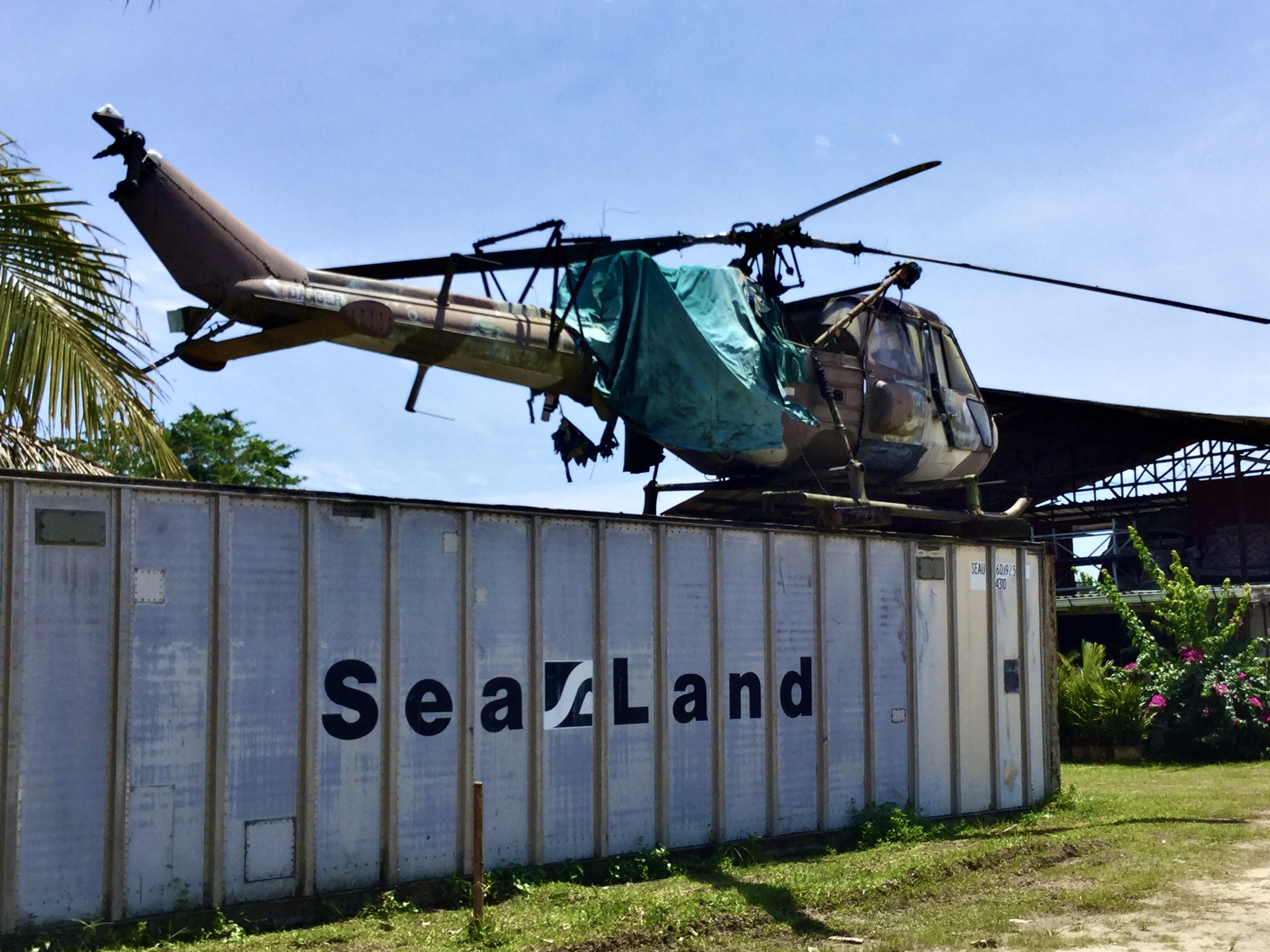
Westland Scout part of the 660 Sqn in Kuala Belait, Brunei.

The Army Air Corps in the Far East had been centralised in 1969 when various flights, troops and Gurkha air platoons were amalgamated, resulting in the re-formation of No. 656 (Independent) Squadron AAC (656 Sqn) in October 1969. One Gurkha air platoon, based with the Gurkha battalion at Seria, remained as an air platoon for a while and then became C Flight 656 Sqn, then Brunei Detachment 660 Sqn in 1978, then C Flight 660 Sqn in 1979. The reorganization and increase in unit size required the squadron to be housed at Sek Kong.

In the spring of 1970, the Sioux helicopters were supplemented by Scouts. The Siouxs were then phased out, with their last flights in Hong Kong being undertaken towards the end of 1974 when they were replaced by Gazelles. By the end of 1975 the Gazelle had been found unsuitable for Hong Kong, and they were returned to the UK, leaving the squadron with just its Scout helicopters. The Siouxs, reputed to be the last in the AAC, were flown in Brunei until 1978 when they were also exchanged with Scouts.

660 Sqn operated at Sek Kong until 1994, when it was disbanded as part of the preparations for the hand over of the Hong Kong Crown Protectorate to the People's Republic of China (PRC). The squadron, 50 years old at the time, was believed to be the last overseas unit using Scout helicopters.

==== Detachments ====
24 January to 14 April 1970
RAF Aldergrove in Northern Ireland (NI)
15 June to 17 October 1973
A small Scout and Sioux detachment stood-up for a four-month tour at Long Kesh in NI.
1 July to 31 October 1975
A detachment was provided for Long Kesh / Ballykelly in NI.

== Current role ==
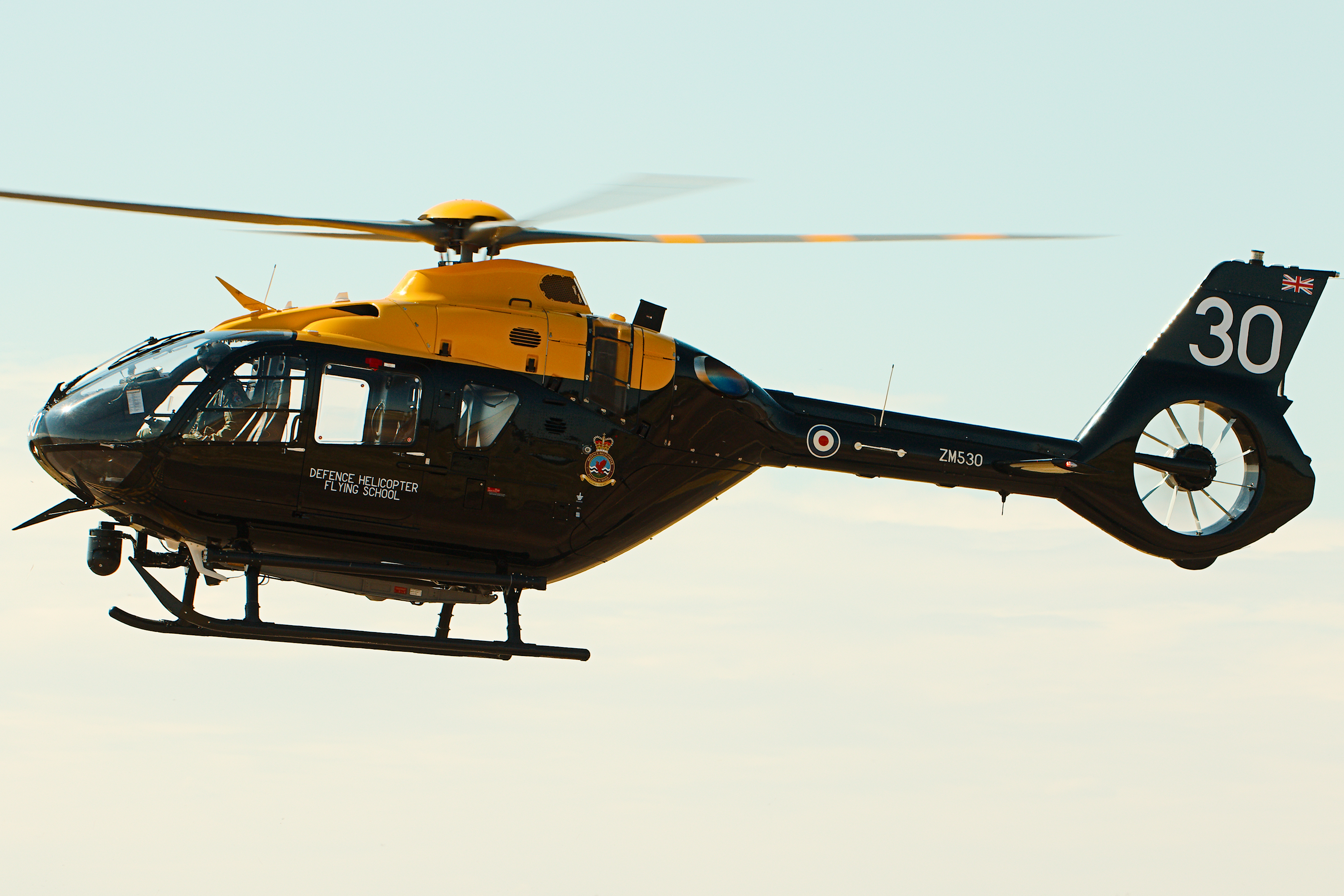
One of 1 FTS's Airbus H135 Juno's.

The Defence Helicopter Flying School concept was born during the Defence Cost Study of 1994, leading to the selection of a single site for basic helicopter training using contractor-owned aircraft and a proportion of civilian (ex-military) flying instructors. The squadron was reformed again in April 1997, as one of two single-engine rotary-wing squadrons of the tri-service Defence Helicopter Flying School, based at RAF Shawbury. 660 Sqn AAC is commanded by an Army major and equipped with civilian-owned Airbus Helicopters H135 (known as Juno).

In October 1996, a contract had been placed with FBS, a company formed between Flight Refuelling Aviation, Bristows Helicopters Ltd and SERCo. This 15-year contract not only covered the engineering and supply aspects already in place, but also included the provision of the 35 Squirrel and Griffin helicopters for the Defence Helicopter Flying School at Shawbury. In practice, FBS now sub-contracts the support of the DHFS and RAF Shawbury to FB Heli Services (formerly FR Aviation Services) thus maintaining the partnership between the company and RAF Shawbury forged over the 5 years previous to that contract. Also included in the contract was the provision of 40% of the helicopter instructors, operations-support staff and flight-systems operators in the Central Air Traffic Control School.

Cobham was awarded a £193m four-year contract in 2012 to provide helicopter flying training at RAF Shawbury, RAF Valley and AAC Middle Wallop, together with support services at RAF Shawbury and AAC Middle Wallop. The contract extended the previously existing Defence Helicopter Flying School and support services contract, which had been undertaken by FBS Ltd and FB Heliservices Ltd for the previous 15 years.

This contract was replaced by the new Rotary Wing Training Programme (part of the UK Military Flying Training System) is currently carried out by Ascent Flight Training and delivers training on the H135 'Juno' and H145 'Jupiter' to both pilots and rear crew. Training is overseen and govern by No. 1 Flying Training School (1 FTS) as of February 2020.

== See also ==
- List of Army Air Corps aircraft units
- List of Royal Air Force aircraft squadrons

== Newspapers and magazines ==
- Laxton, Andrew (19 September 1993). "Grounded Wessex hit island ridge". South China Morning Post.
- Clarke, Rachel (15 October 1993). "660 Squadron named as first unit to disband". South China Morning Post.
- The Business Desk (6 March 2012). "Cobham's FB Heliservices wins £193m MoD contract". The Business Desk.
- Tim Ripley (9 September 2014). "UK seeks new contractor for helicopter training". Jane's.
- Dominic Perry (10 September 2014). "UK MoD begins training helicopter acquisition". Flight Global.

== Web sites ==
- Helis (2014). "660 squadron Army Air Corps 1943 to present". helis.com.
- A. Young (2014). "660 Squadron". british-army-units1945on.co.uk.
- QRA Magazin (2013). "Army Air Corps in Germany". qra-magazin.de. Archived from the original on 12 July 2014.
- UK MoD (2014). "4 Regiment Army Air Corps". army.mod.uk.
- RAF Shawbury (2014). "RAF Shawbury: Defence Helicopter Flying School". raf.mod.uk.
- RAF Shawbury: Contractors (2014). "RAF Shawbury: Contractors". Archived from the original on 11 June 2008.
- Cobham (2014). "Military Base Turn-key Solutions" (Press release).
