= 662 Squadron =

662 Squadron may refer to:

- No. 662 Squadron RAF, 1943-45 and 1949-57
- No. 662 Squadron AAC (Army Air Corps), 1971-
