= Soest-Bad Sassendorf Airfield =

Soest-Bad Sassendorf Airfield Flugplatz Soest - Bad Sassendorf
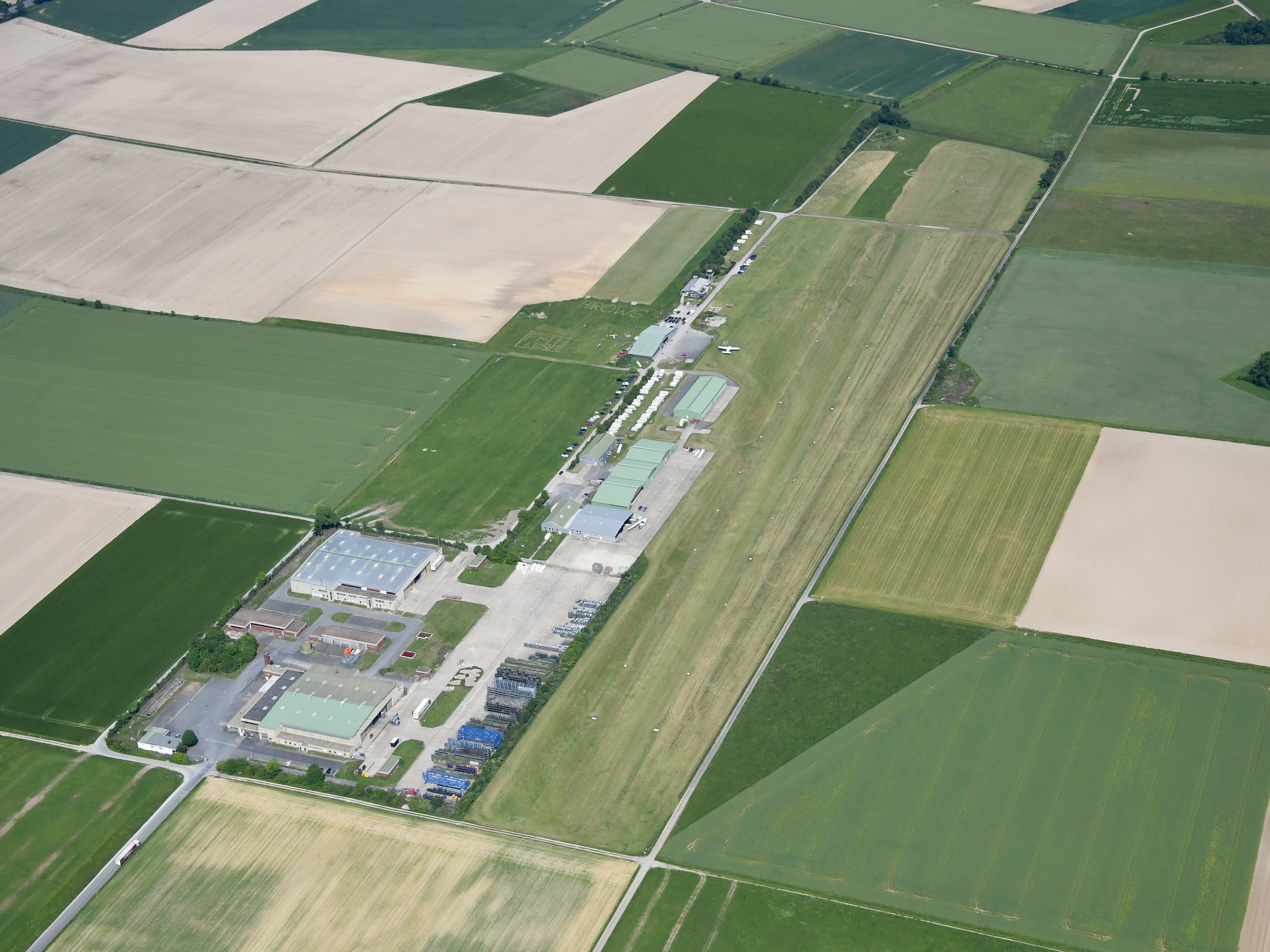
- IATA: none; ICAO: EDLZ

Summary
- Airport type: Private
- Operator: Flugsportgemeinschaft Soest e.V
- Serves: Soest / Bad Sassendorf
- Location: Soest, North Rhine-Westphalia, Germany
- Opened: 1 June 1956; 70 years ago
- Elevation AMSL: 120 m (390 ft)
- Coordinates: 51°34′41″N 008°12′53″E

Map
- Location of airport in Germany

Runways
Direction	Length		Surface
Direction	m	ft	Surface
07/25	820	2,690	grass

Soest-Bad Sassendorf Airfield (ICAO: EDLZ), located in the Sauerland region close to Soest and the Möhnesee, between the A 44 and B 1, is now a civilian airfield. It is rated / approved as a 'special landing site'. These are often used by private aero clubs. Unlike a commercial airfield, only the operators (and upon request also third parties) may take off and land. There is no obligation to operate, and therefore published opening times are not required.

In 2001, the airfield saw the launch of the Airfisch 8 ground effect vehicle, designed to fly only 0.1 to 2.5 metres (3.9 inches to 8 feet 2.4 inches) above the water's surface.

== Military history ==
Previously been used by the Royal Canadian Army from 1953 to 1971, in the latter part of the Cold War (from 1971 until mid-1994), 3 Regiment Army Air Corps (3 AAC) of the British Army was based here. 3 AAC operated Westland Scout AH1, Westland Gazelle AH1, and Westland Lynx AH1 and AH7 helicopters. AAC units based there included: 653, 654, 660, 662, and 663 squadrons. Following the drawdown of British Forces Germany (BFG), 3 Regiment Army Air Corps subsequently relocated to Wattisham Airfield, Suffolk, England.

== Site / services ==
The length of the airfield main runway is 820 metres (2,690 feet), while the glider winch launching distance is about 1,000 metres (3,300 feet) long. They are both grass runways, with headings 07/25. The traffic pattern runs south, as the northerly air space is reserved for skydivers. The airfield frequency is 122.600 MHz. There is a fuel station at the airfield with Avgas, Mogas, and Jet A-1 available.

== Flying operations ==
Two clubs are based here: the Flugsportgemeinschaft Soest e.V (Soest Flying Club) operating powered aircraft and gliders, and the Fallschirmsportclub Soest-Bad Sassendorf e.V (Soest-Bad Sassendorf Skydiving Club). There is also a gyrocopter flying school operating here, run by the Flugdienst Sauerland. Flying is usually on Saturdays, Sundays, and public holidays (occasionally also on normal business days), weather permitting. The gliding season runs regularly from late March or early April to late October or early November. Powered flight takes place year-round.

The small airfield also holds flying days where aerobatics and stunts are presented by professional pilots and aerobatic pilots.

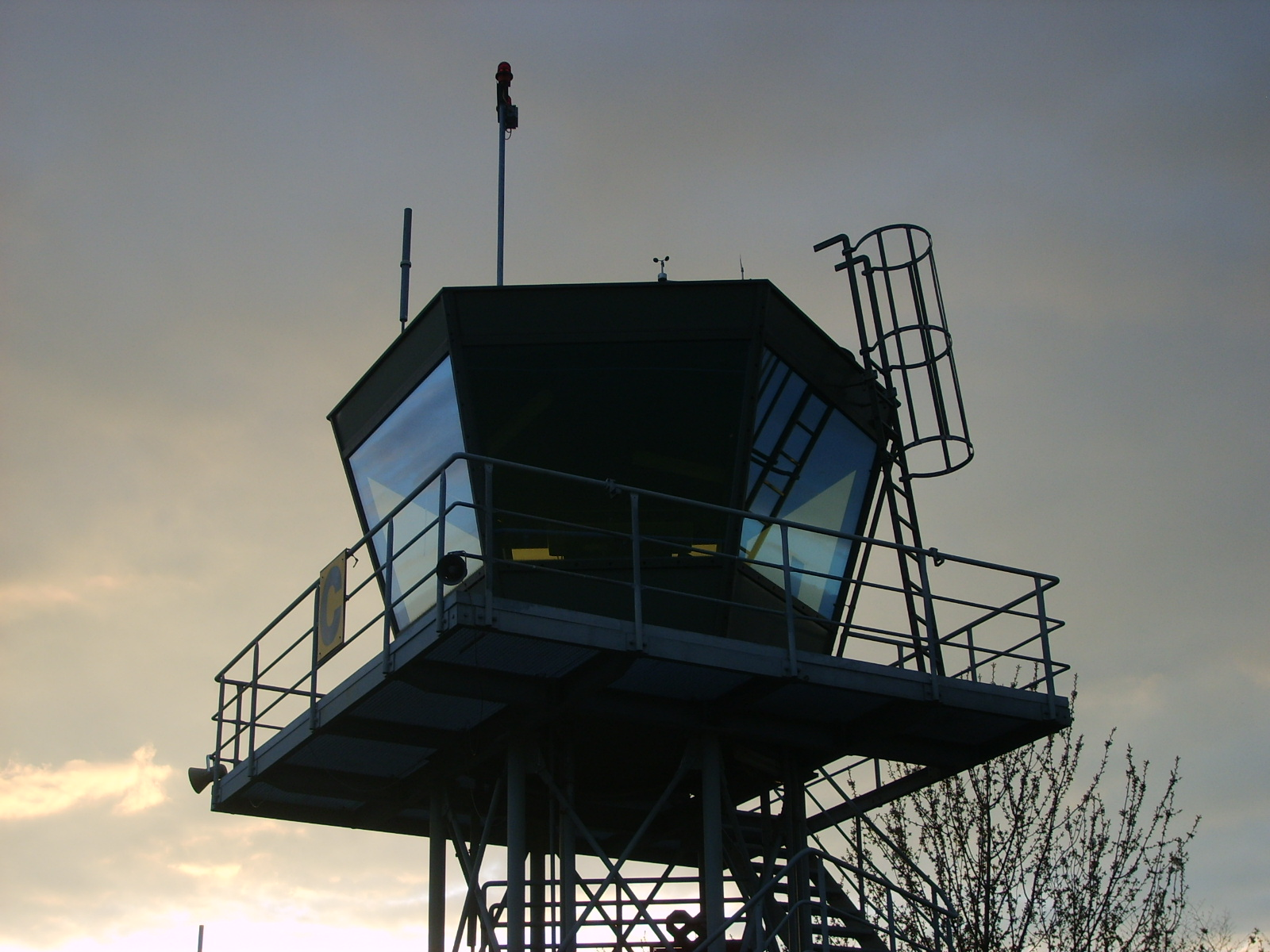
Tower

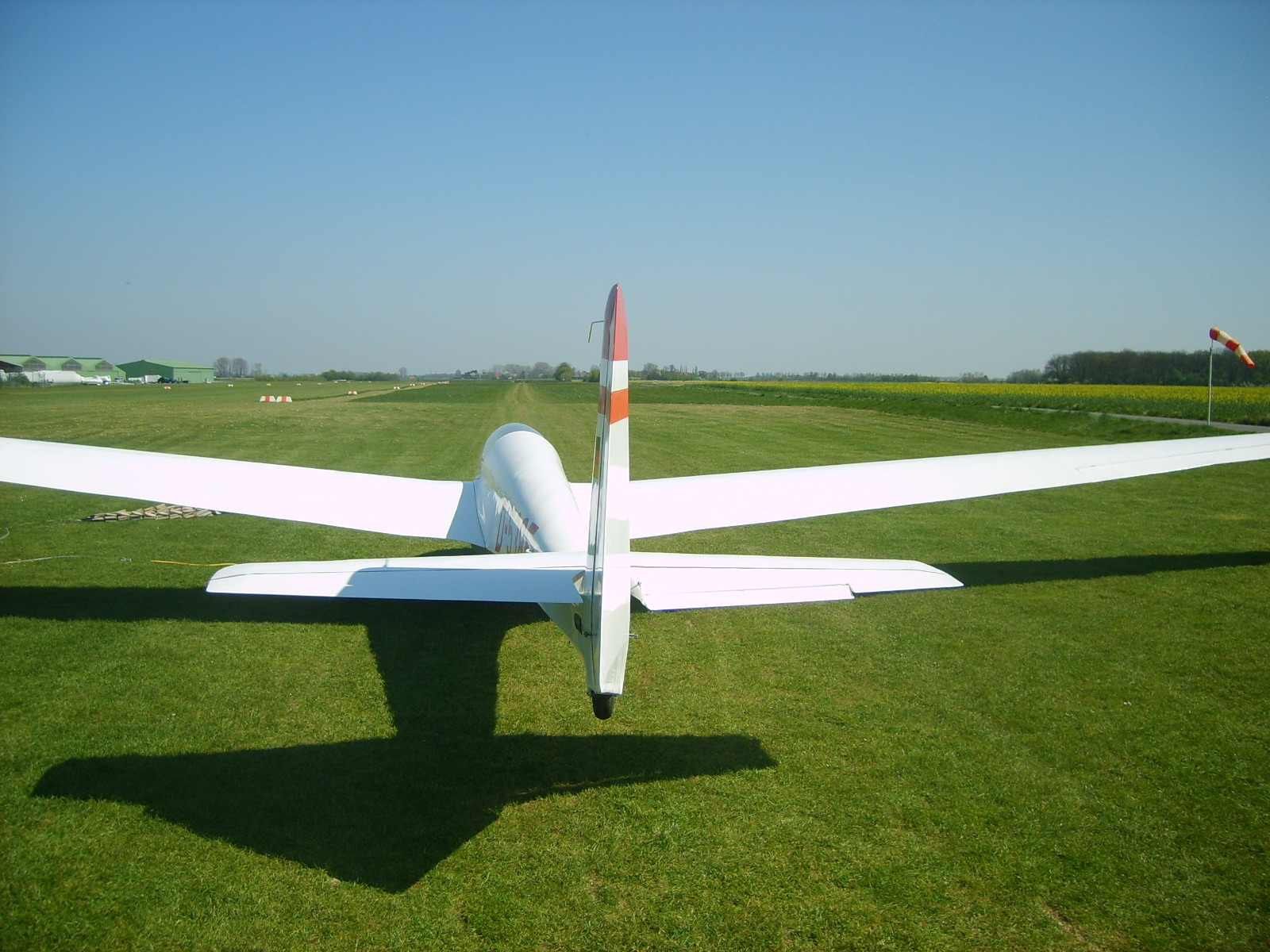
An ASK-13 glider ready for a winch launch at Soest

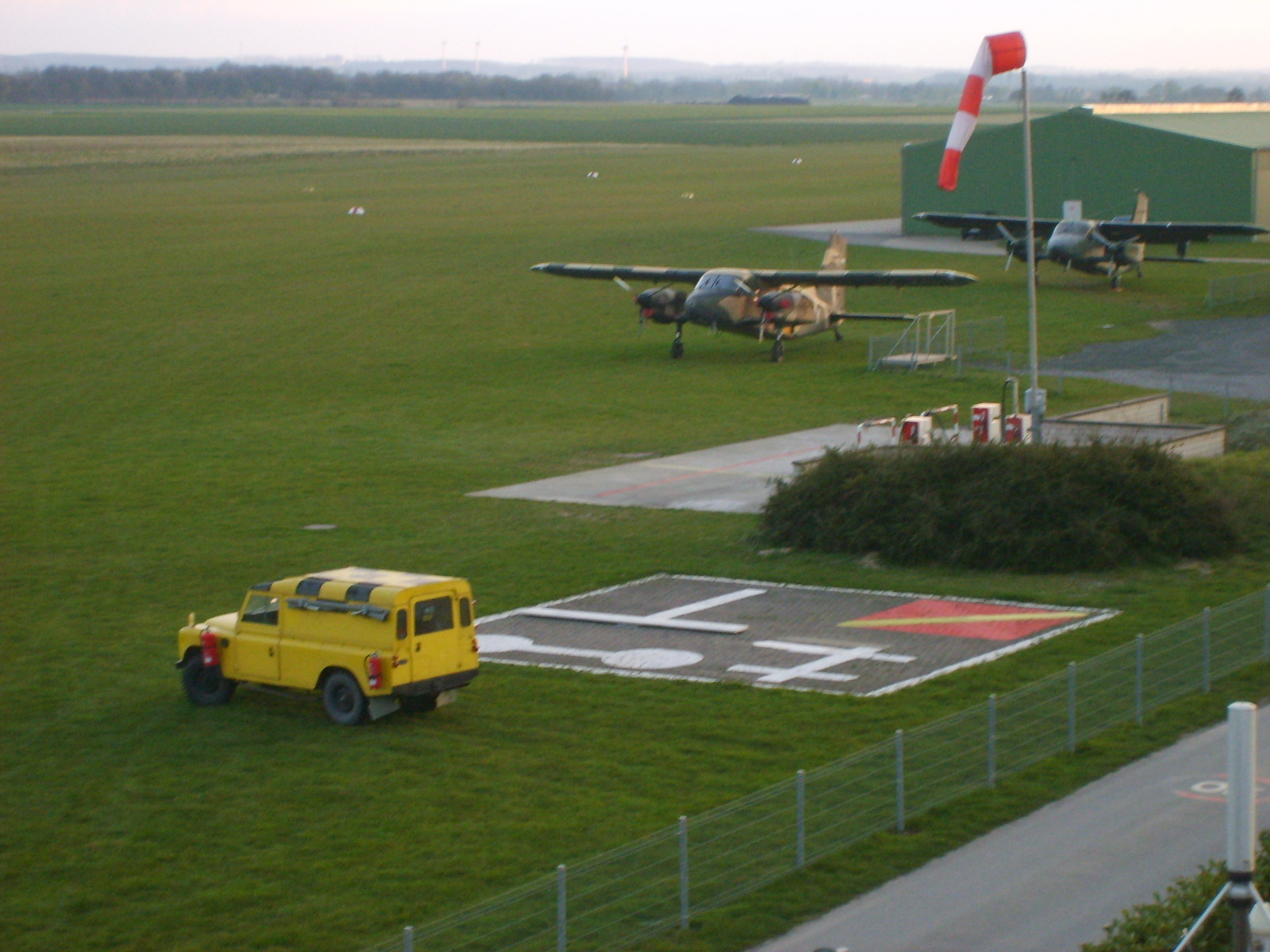
View from control tower towards fuel station and windsock

== See also ==
- List of airfields and special landing sites in Germany (German Wikipedia page)
- German-language Wikipedia article - from which this article was started.
