= 2 (Training) Regiment Army Air Corps =

2 (Training) Regiment Army Air Corps 2nd Division Aviation (1964–1969)
- Active: 1964–1983; 1994–present
- Country: United Kingdom
- Branch: British Army
- Type: Aviation
- Role: Training
- Size: Regiment
- Part of: Army Aviation Centre
- Base: Middle Wallop Flying Station

Insignia
- Squadron Badge heraldry: The Regimental emblem is the Army Air Corps Cap Badge with the Roman numerals II beneath.

2 (Training) Regiment Army Air Corps is a regiment of the British Army's Army Air Corps. It is responsible for all of the Army Air Corps' groundcrew Phase 2 and 3 training, as well as the Ground Support Commanders Course for officers.

== History ==
The regiment provided support for the British Army of the Rhine (BAOR) from 1964 until 1976. The regiment was based at Hildesheim and made up of three squadrons (652 Squadron AAC at Bünde, 659 Squadron AAC at Osnabrück and 662 Squadron AAC at Münster).

In 1976 the regiment was re-organized (with 659 Squadron AAC becoming part of 9 Regiment AAC) and renamed 2 Regiment Army Air Corps. From 1976, 652 and 662 Squadrons were at Münster.

In 1983 the regiment was temporarily disbanded, with 652 Squadron AAC becoming part of 1 Regiment AAC and 662 Squadron AAC becoming part of 3 Regiment AAC.

The regiment was re-formed in 1994 as 2 (Training) Regiment Army Air Corps, based at Middle Wallop and is responsible for training the Army Air Corps' groundcrews.

== Organisation ==
The Regiment is based at Middle Wallop Flying Station and is made up of three squadrons:

- No. 668 (Training) Squadron AAC is responsible for the ground crew training that includes re-arming, refueling and ground maneuvers of the Apache.
- No. 671 (Headquarters) Squadron AAC
- No. 676 Squadron AAC is responsible for the administration and welfare of the phase 2 trainees at the Army Aviation Centre.

== See also ==
- List of Army Air Corps aircraft units (United Kingdom)
