= 7 Aviation Support Battalion REME =

- Active: 1992–present
- Country: United Kingdom
- Branch: British Army
- Role: Equipment Support
- Size: Battalion; 438 personnel
- Part of: 1st Aviation Brigade Combat Team
- Garrison/HQ: Wattisham Flying Station, Suffolk
- Engagements: Operation Telic; Operation Herrick

Insignia
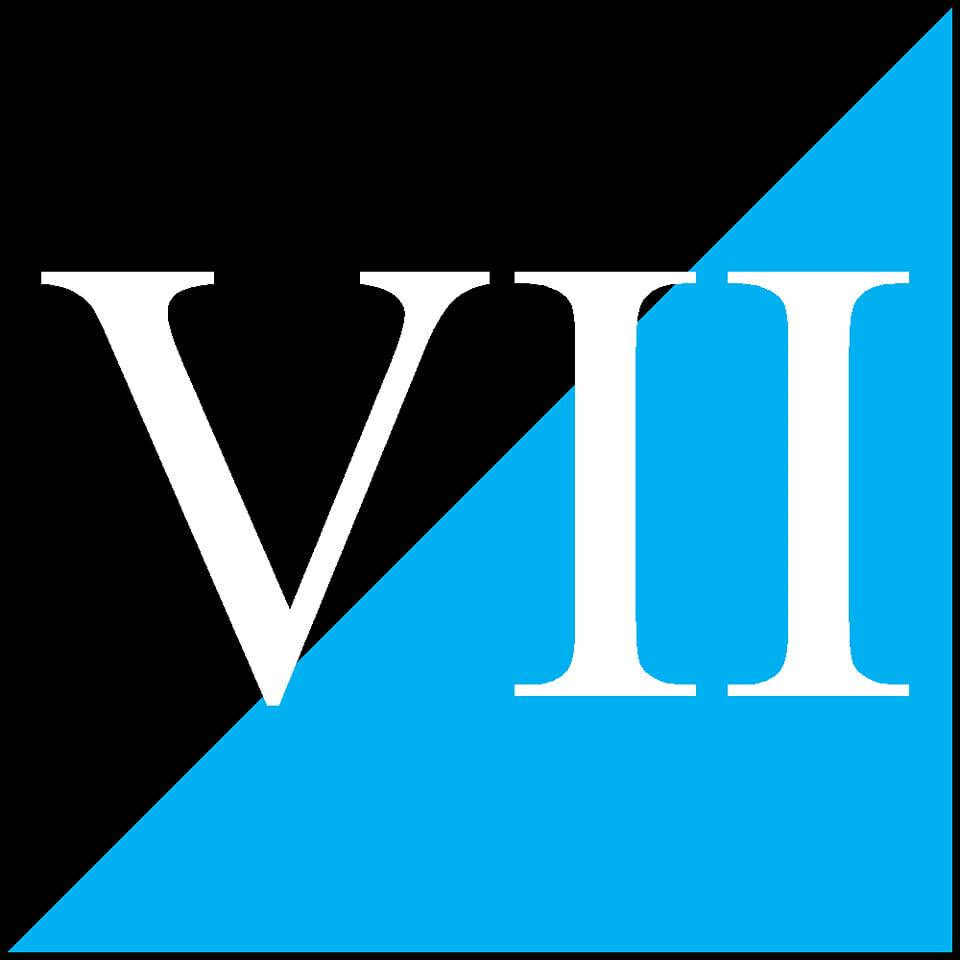
- Badge

7 Aviation Support Battalion REME is a battalion of the Royal Electrical and Mechanical Engineers of the British Army.

== History ==
The battalion was formed in the early 1990s at Detmold in Germany. It was a regular REME battalion, formed from 8 Close Support Company, 71 Close Support Company, 73 Close Support Company, and 72 (Depth) Company. It moved to Wattisham in 1994. The battalion went on to deploy to Iraq (after 2003) and Afghanistan, to support both 24th Airmobile Brigade and 16th Air Assault Brigade.

132 Aviation Supply Unit was formed in 1993 at Wattisham. In September 1999 it was redesignated 132 Aviation Supply Squadron. At some later point in time it was again redesignated to 132 Aviation Support Squadron. It is responsible for aviation supply support to the whole of the Army Aviation community.

== Structure ==
The battalion's current structure is as follows:

- Battalion Headquarters
- 70 Field Company
- 71 Aviation Company
- 72 Headquarter Company
- 73 Aviation Company
- 132 Aviation Support Squadron RLC
