= 1st Aviation Brigade (United Kingdom) =

- Active: 1 April 2020–present
- Country: United Kingdom
- Branch: British Army
- Type: Army aviation
- Role: Attack; Reconnaissance
- Part of: Joint Aviation Command
- Garrison/HQ: Middle Wallop Flying Station
- Mottos: Fly, Fight, Lead

Aircraft flown
- Attack helicopter: Boeing AH-64E Apache
- Observation helicopter: Wildcat AH1

The 1st Aviation Brigade is an aviation formation of the British Army. Most of its units are from the Army Air Corps (AAC). It was stood up on 1 April 2020 by combining the Wattisham Flying Station Headquarters (WFS HQ), formerly the Attack Helicopter Force (AHF) at Wattisham and the Aviation Reconnaissance Force at the Royal Naval Air Station Yeovilton.

It reached initial operating capability on 1 April 2021 and full operating capability on 1 January 2023. For a period it was designated the 1st Aviation Brigade Combat Team.

== Units in 2021 ==
The units of the brigade were, in 2021, as follows:

- Headquarters, 1st Aviation Brigade, at Middle Wallop Flying Station
  - No. 678 Squadron Army Air Corps, Brigade Signals Squadron, at Middle Wallop Flying Station
  - 1 Regiment Army Air Corps, at RNAS Yeovilton (HMS Heron) (Aviation Reconnaissance, equipped with AgustaWestland Wildcat AH1)
  - 3 Regiment Army Air Corps, at Wattisham Flying Station (Aviation Attack, equipped with Boeing AH-64E Apache)
  - 4 Regiment Army Air Corps, at Wattisham Flying Station (Aviation Attack, equipped with Boeing AH-64E Apache)
  - 5 Regiment Army Air Corps, at Middle Wallop Flying Station
  - 6 Regiment Army Air Corps (Army Reserve), at Middle Wallop Flying Station (Ground Crew Reserve)
  - 7 Aviation Support Battalion REME, Royal Electrical and Mechanical Engineers, at Wattisham Flying Station
    - 132 Aviation Support Squadron, Royal Logistic Corps

== See also ==
- List of Army Air Corps aircraft units (United Kingdom)
