= No. 663 Squadron AAC =

Flying squadron of the British Army's Army Air Corps

No. 663 Squadron AAC 663 Interim Aviation Squadron No. 663 Squadron
- Active: 14 Aug – 29 Oct 1946 (Polish); 1 July 1949 – 10 Mar 1957 (RAuxAF); 1 Oct 1969 – 1 Apr 1978; 1 April 1978 – present
- Country: United Kingdom
- Branch: (United Kingdom) British Army
- Type: Aviation
- Part of: 3 Regiment Army Air Corps
- Base: Wattisham Flying Station
- Motto: We fly for the guns.

Commanders
- Current commander: Major Kate Jacka

Insignia
- Squadron badge heraldry: An Eagle displayed holding a snaffle bit

Aircraft flown
- Attack helicopter: Boeing AH-64E Apache

663 Squadron AAC is a flying unit of the British Army's Army Air Corps (AAC).

== History ==
Polish use

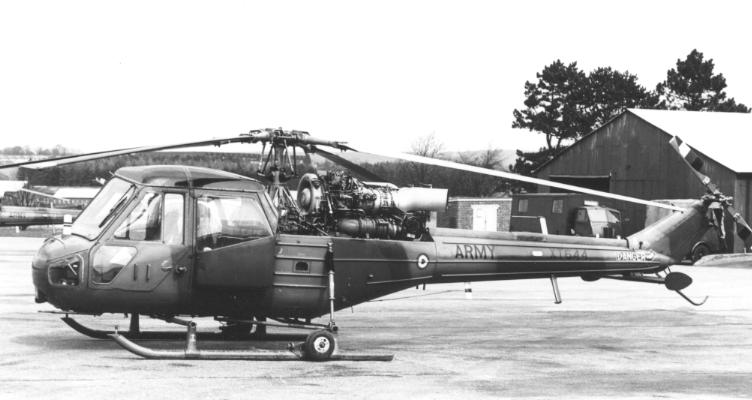
663 Squadron AAC Westland Scout AH.1 in 1969

No. 663 Squadron had been formed in northern Italy on 14 August 1944, as an air observation post (AOP) unit, and was composed of Polish officers and soldiers. The squadron was to spot for allied artillery units in that war zone. The unit left for the UK on 10 October 1946 and was formally disbanded on 29 October.

Royal Auxiliary Air Force

663 Squadron was reformed as a Royal Auxiliary Air Force (RAuxAF) AOP unit on 1 July 1949, composed of Territorial Army artillery officers and soldiers. It was based at RAF Hooton Park, Cheshire, with detached flights. The RAuxAF was disbanded on 10 March 1957.

Location used by No. 663 Squadron RAuxAF
Location	Date	Notes
RAF Ringway	1 July 1949	No. 1951 Reserve AOP Flight RAF
RAF Llandow	1 July 1949	No. 1952 Reserve AOP Flight RAF
RAF Llandow	18 June 1953	No. 1953 Reserve AOP Flight RAF
RAF Hooton Park	1 July 1949	No. 1954 Reserve AOP Flight RAF
RAF Hooton Park	27 March 1953	No. 1955 Reserve AOP Flight RAF

Army Air Corps

The unit was reformed as 663 Interim Aviation Squadron in October 1969 at Perham Down, Wiltshire, from 3 Flight AAC and the air troop of 15/19 Hussars and 5 Lt Regt RA. It was commanded by Maj Bill Duthoit, the Flt commanders being Capt J Orde and Capt Morley RA. Its allocated mission was to support army formations in the Salisbury Plain area. The unit's initial equipment was the Bell Sioux AH.1 helicopter, with these being later replaced by the Westland Scout AH.1 turbine helicopter. On 1 January 1973, the unit was renamed No. 663 Squadron AAC. The Squadron again disbanded in July 1977.

Following a restructuring of Army Air Squadrons, 660 Squadron was redesignated as 663 Squadron, part of 3 Regiment Army Air Corps, based at Salamanca Barracks, Soest, Germany. Since 1993 it has been based at Wattisham Flying Station near Stowmarket, Suffolk. In recent years it has replaced its Westland Gazelles with Westland-assembled Boeing AH-64 Apache (AgustaWestland Apache) attack helicopters. More recently, the squadron has served in the Iraq War (Operation Telic), Afghanistan (Operation Herrick) and the Baltics (Operation Cabrit).

== See also ==
- List of Army Air Corps aircraft units
