= No. 662 Squadron AAC =

Flying squadron of the British Army's Army Air Corps

No. 662 Squadron AAC No. 662 Squadron RAF
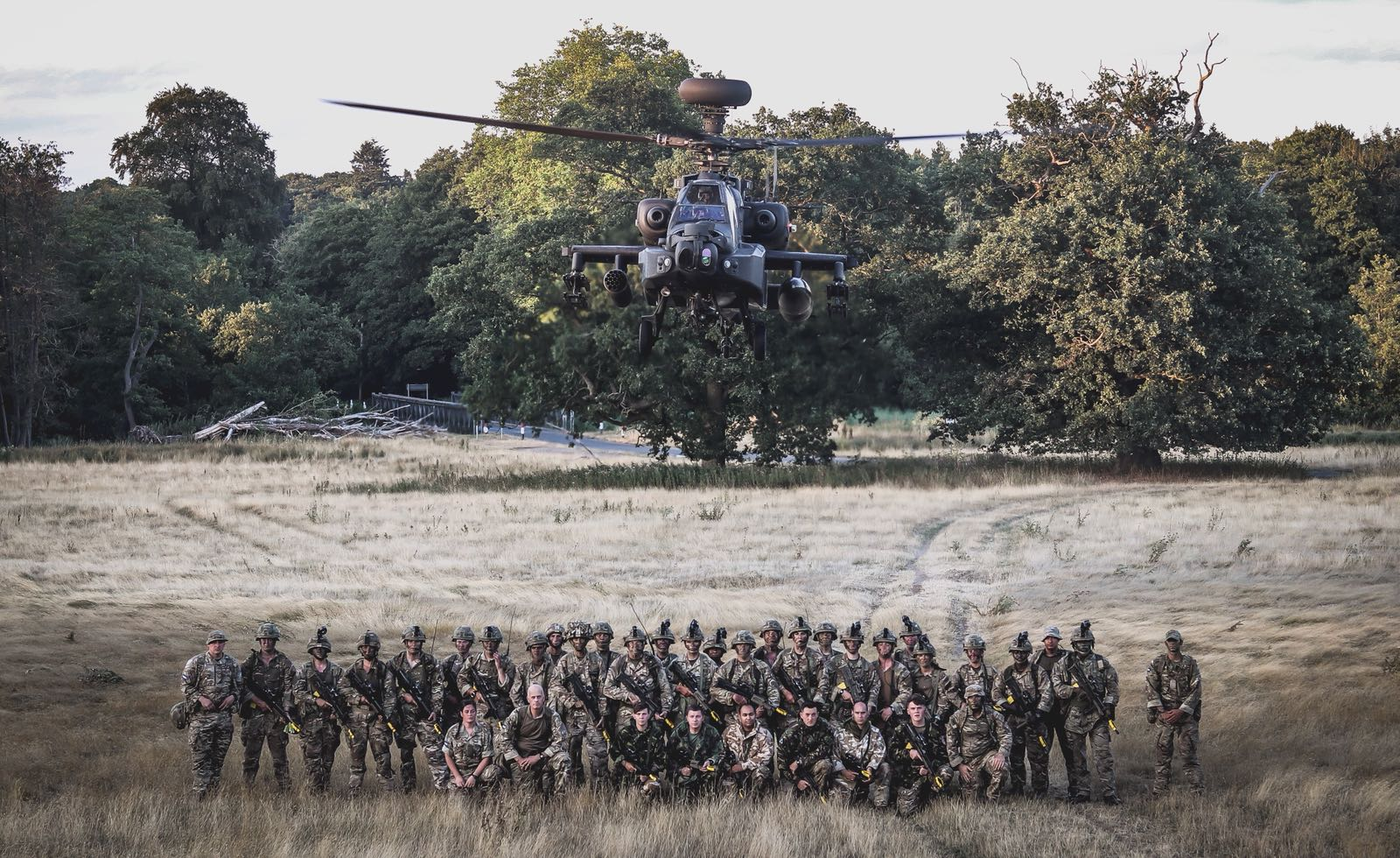
- Battlecraft Syllabus training on Thetford in 2018
- Active: 30 September 1943 – 15 December 1945 (RAF); 1 February 1949 – 10 March 1957 (RAuxAF); 1 November 1971 – present
- Country: United Kingdom
- Branch: (United Kingdom) British Army
- Type: Aviation
- Part of: 3 Regiment Army Air Corps
- Garrison/HQ: Wattisham Flying Station

Aircraft flown
- Attack helicopter: Boeing AH-64E Apache

No. 662 Squadron AAC is a squadron of the British Army's Army Air Corps (AAC) which flies the Boeing AH-64E Apache from Wattisham Flying Station as part of 3 Regiment Army Air Corps. It was formerly No. 662 Squadron, a Royal Air Force air observation post squadron associated with the 21st Army Group during the Second World War and later part of the Royal Auxiliary Air Force. Numbers 651 to 663 Squadrons of the RAF were air observation post units working closely with British Army units in artillery spotting and liaison. A further three of these squadrons, 664–666, were manned with Canadian personnel. Their duties and squadron numbers were transferred to the Army with the formation of the Army Air Corps on 1 September 1957.

== History ==
=== Royal Air Force ===
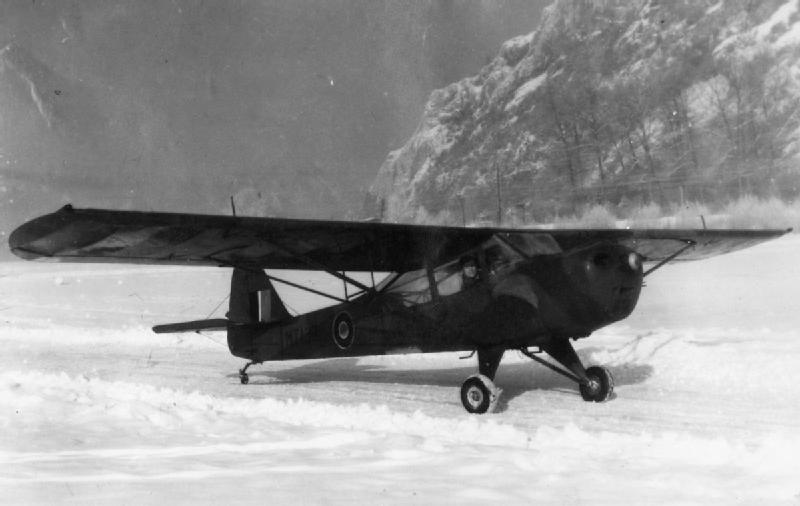
662 Squadron Taylorcraft Auster in Belgium, Second World War

No. 662 Squadron was formed at RAF Old Sarum on 30 September 1943 with the Taylorcraft Auster III which gave way to the Auster IV in March 1944. The squadron role was to support the British 21st Army Group in June 1944 when it moved to France. It briefly flew from Nordhorn in Germany from 7 to 10 April 1945. The squadron supported the Army until the end of the war when it was disbanded on 15 December 1945 at Melsbroek in Belgium.

After the war the Air Observation Squadrons were reformed and No. 662 Squadron Royal Auxiliary Air Force was reformed as such at RAF Colerne on 1 May 1949, also operating a flight from RAF Middle Wallop, to provide support to the Army in the West Country until it was disbanded at RAF Colerne on 10 March 1957.

Its motto was: Greek Olethrion Omma ("Death dealing eye"), for an identification symbol it was used "In front of two shells in saltire, an eagle's head erased". For identification symbols it used: ET (Sep 1944 – Dec 1945) ROB (Feb 1949 – Apr 1951)

No. 1956 Reserve Air Observation Post Flight was formed within 662 Squadron along with No. 1962 Reserve Air Observation Post Flight and No. 1963 Reserve Air Observation Post Flight.

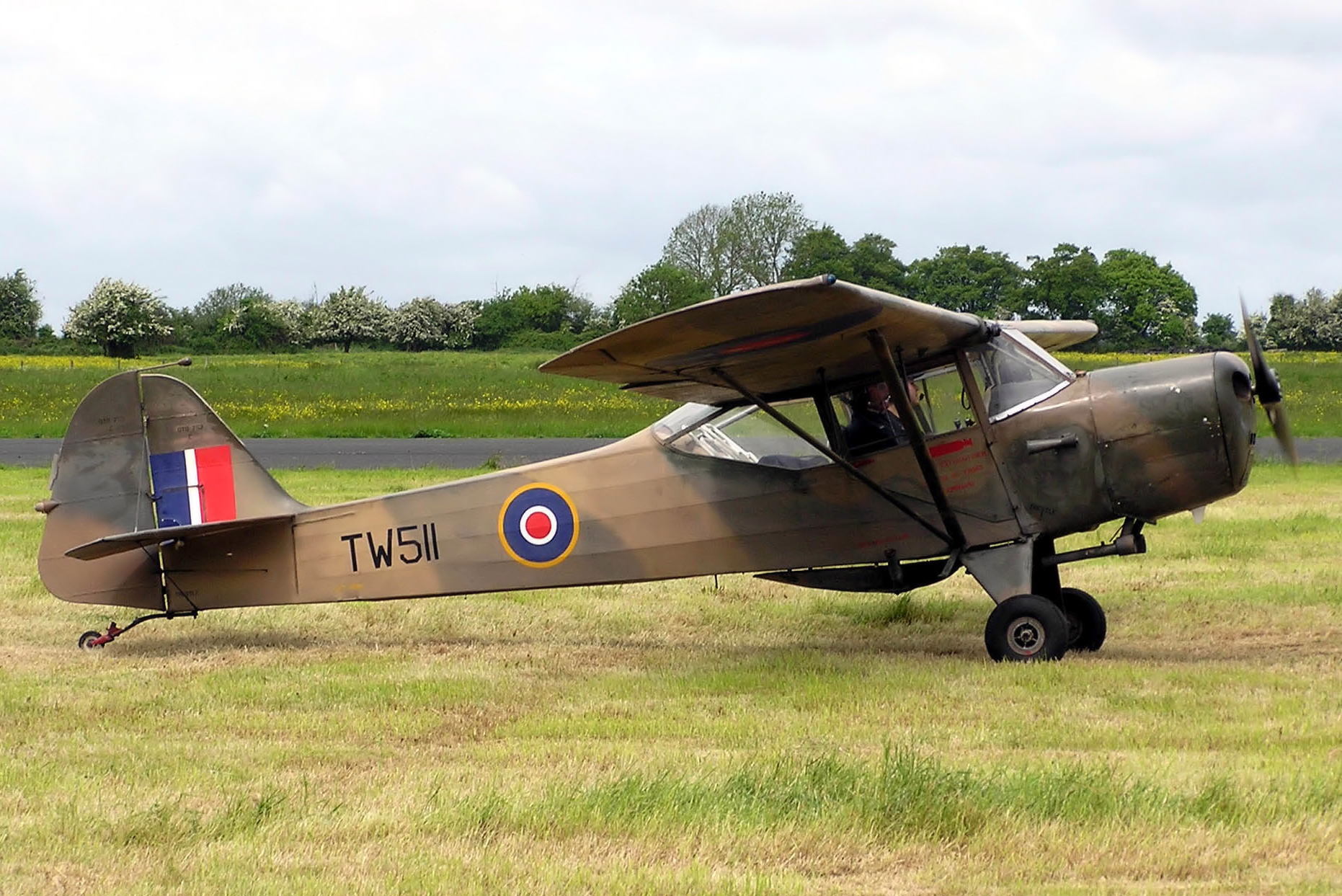
A postwar Auster Mk.V, restored in wartime colours.

Aircraft operated by No. 662 Squadron RAF/RAuxAF, data from
| From | To | Aircraft | Variant |
|---|---|---|---|
| September 1943 | April 1944 | Taylorcraft Auster | III |
| March 1944 | December 1945 | Auster | IV |
| September 1944 | December 1945 | Auster | V |
| October 1949 | January 1950 | Auster | IV |
| February 1949 | October 1951 | Auster | V |
| February 1949 | February 1957 | Auster | AOP.6 |

=== Army Air Corps ===
On 1 November 1971 the squadron reformed in West Germany as part of 3AAC, located at Salamanca Barracks, Soest.

The squadron is currently stationed at Wattisham Flying Station, Suffolk, where it operates Boeing AH-64E Apache attack helicopters, in support of 3rd (UK) Division.

== See also ==
- List of Army Air Corps aircraft units
- List of Royal Air Force aircraft squadrons
