= Army Air Corps (United Kingdom) =

Aviation arm of the British Army

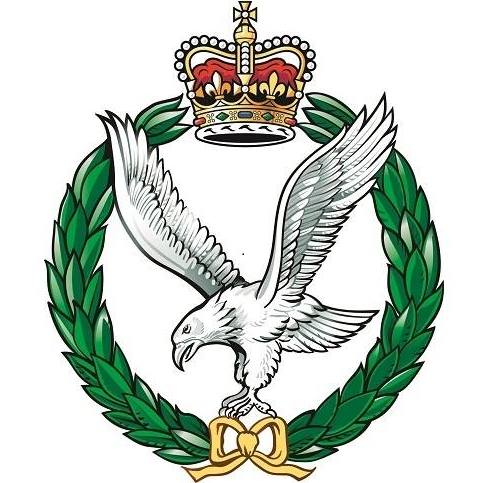
- Cap Badge of the Army Air Corps.
- Active: 1942–1949; 1957–present
- Country: United Kingdom
- Branch: British Army
- Type: Army aviation
- Role: Battlefield support, reconnaissance
- Size: 2,000 personnel Approx. 150 aircraft
- Garrison/HQ: Middle Wallop Flying Station
- March: Quick: Recce Flight; Slow: Thieving Magpie
- Battle honours: Falkland Islands 1982; Wadi al-Batin, Gulf 1991; Basra, Iraq 2003

Commanders
- Colonel-in-Chief: William, Prince of Wales
- Colonel Commandant: Major General M. R. Keating, CBE
- Commander: Colonel E. Butterworth ADC
- Commander: Warrant Officer Class 1 O. Mercer

Insignia
- Tactical Recognition Flash

Aircraft flown
- Attack: Apache AH-64E V6
- Reconnaissance: Wildcat AH1
- Trainer: Jupiter HT1; Juno HT1
- Transport: AS365N3 Dauphin II

The Army Air Corps (AAC) is the aviation arm of the British Army, first formed in 1942 during the Second World War by grouping the various airborne units of the British Army. Today, there are eight regiments (seven Regular Army and one Reserve) of the AAC, as well as two independent flights and two independent squadrons deployed in support of British Army operations around the world. Regiments and flights are located in the United Kingdom, Kenya, and Canada. Some AAC squadrons provide the air assault elements of 16 Air Assault Brigade, through Joint Aviation Command.

== History ==
=== Precursors ===
The British Army first took to the sky during the 19th century with the use of observation balloons. In 1911 the Air Battalion of the Royal Engineers was the first heavier-than-air British military aviation unit. The following year, the battalion was expanded into the Military Wing of the Royal Flying Corps which saw action throughout most of the First World War until 1 April 1918, when it was merged with the Royal Naval Air Service to form the Royal Air Force. Between the wars, the army used RAF co-operation squadrons. At the beginning of the Second World War, Royal Artillery officers, with the assistance of RAF technicians, flew Auster observation aircraft under RAF-owned air observation post (AOP) squadrons. Twelve squadrons were raised, three of which belonged to the Royal Canadian Air Force (RCAF) and each performed vital duties in many theatres.

=== First formation: 1942–1949 ===
In 1942, Winston Churchill announced the establishment of a new branch of army aviation, the Army Air Corps. The corps initially comprised the Glider Pilot Regiment and the Parachute Battalions (subsequently the Parachute Regiment), Air Landing Regiments, and the air observation post squadrons. In March 1944, the SAS Regiment was added to the corps.

One of their most successful exploits during the war was the capture of the Caen canal and Orne river bridges by coup de main, which occurred on 6 June 1944, before the Normandy landings. Once the three gliders landed, some roughly which incurred casualties, the pilots joined the glider-borne troops (Ox & Bucks Light Infantry) to act as infantry. The bridge was taken within ten minutes of the battle commencing and the men withstood numerous attempts by the Germans to re-capture the location. They were soon reinforced and relieved by soldiers from the 1st Special Service Brigade (Lord Lovat). The AAC was disbanded in 1949, with the SAS regaining independent status, while the Parachute Regiment and Glider Pilot Regiment came under the umbrella of the Glider Pilot and Parachute Corps.

=== Second formation: 1957–present ===
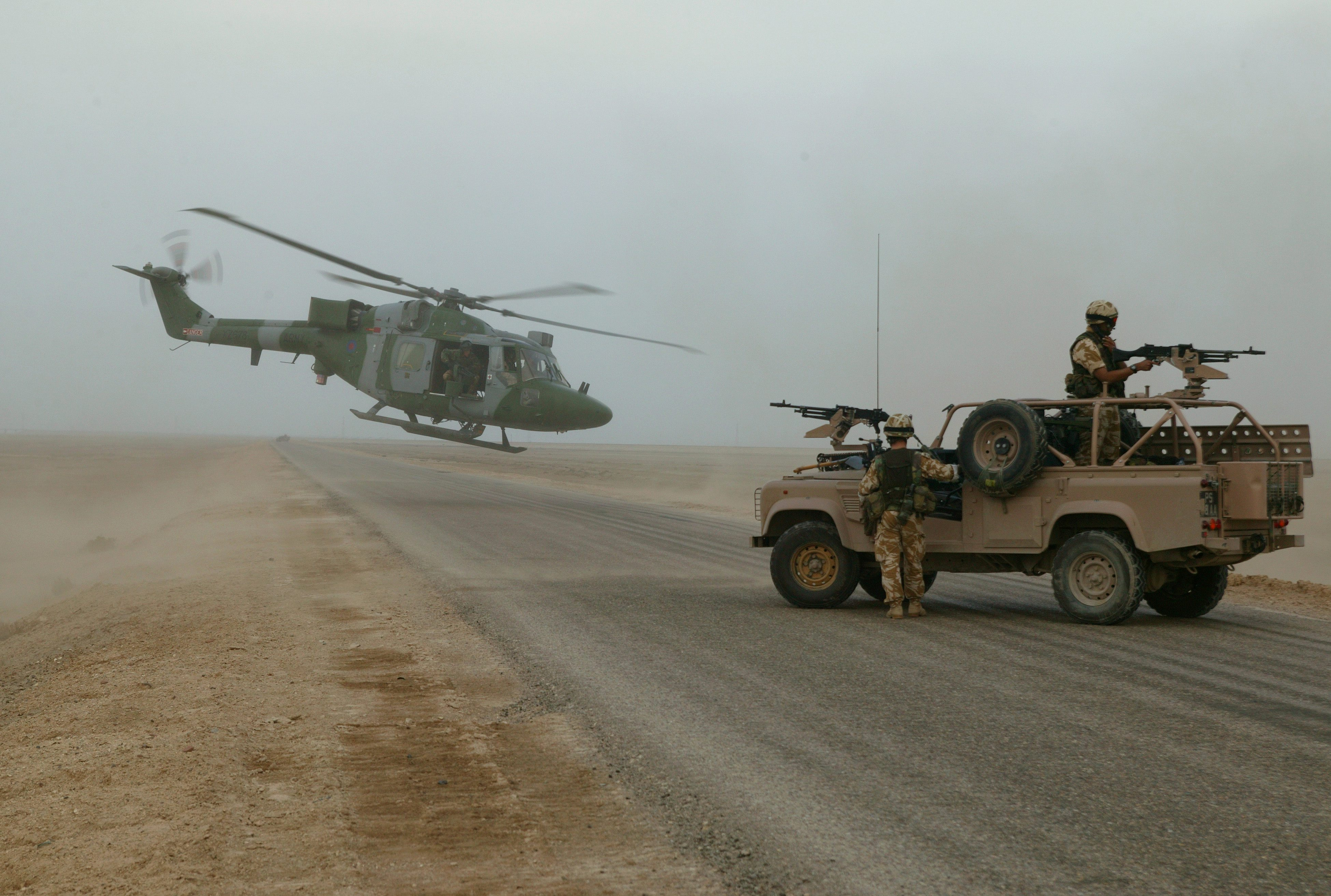
A Westland Lynx AH.7 of the Army Air Corps taking off from a desert road south of Basra Airport, Iraq, November 2003

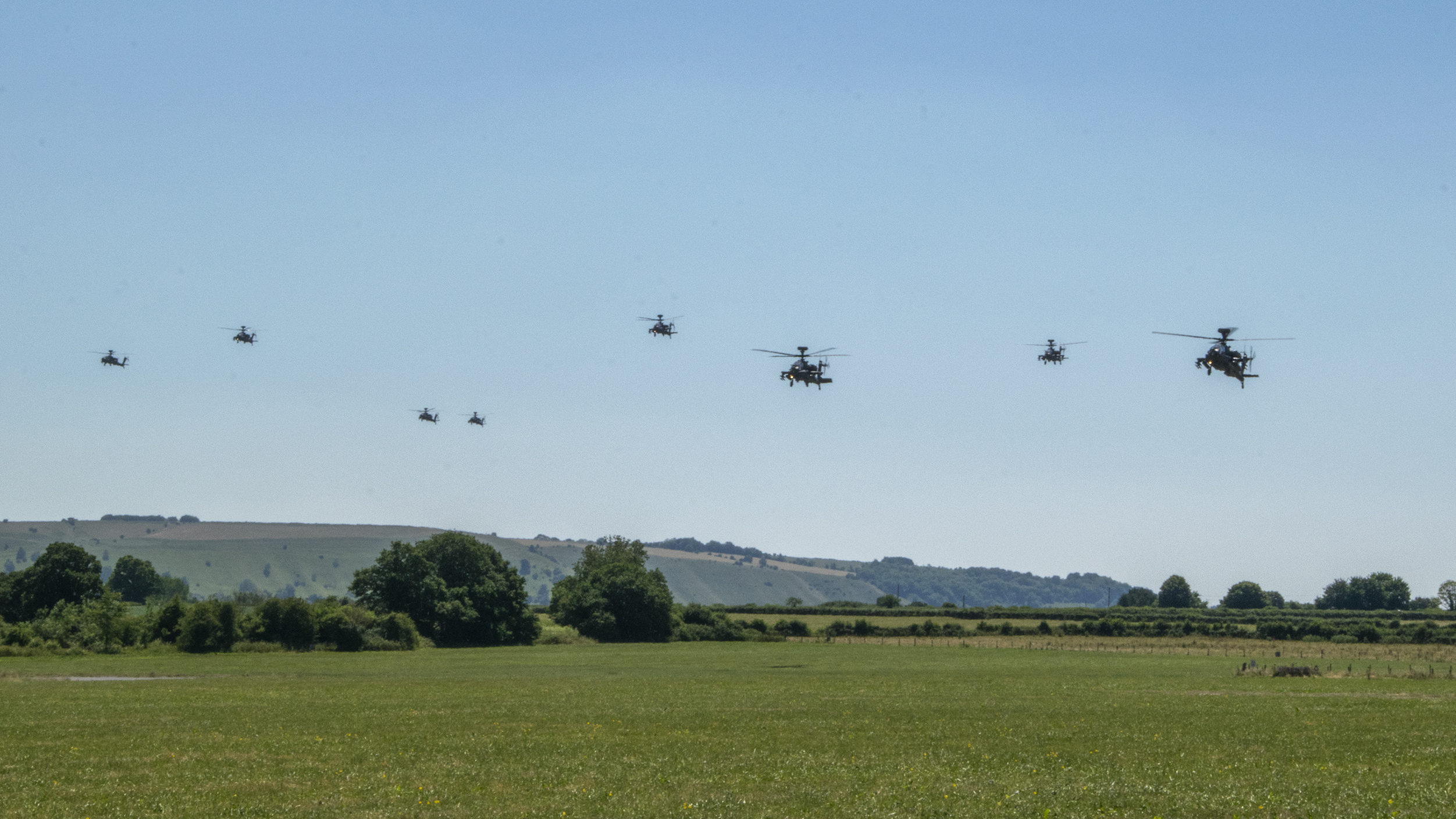
Eight Apache attack helicopters of 3 Regiment Army Air Corps during Exercise Talon Gravis, 2019.

In 1957 the Glider Pilot and Parachute Corps was split, with the Parachute Regiment becoming an independent formation, while the Glider Pilot Regiment was merged with the Air Observation Squadrons of the Royal Artillery into a new unit, the Army Air Corps.

In 1958 the Saunders-Roe Skeeter 7 was introduced as the AAC's first helicopter, it was replaced by the Aérospatiale Alouette II and Westland Scout AH.1 during the early 1960s. The de Havilland Canada DHC-2 Beaver AL.1 was introduced during the 1960s along with the Agusta/Westland Sioux AH.1 in 1964.

From 1970, nearly every army brigade had at least one Aviation Squadron that usually numbered twelve aircraft. The main rotor aircraft during the 1970s were the Westland Scout and Bell Sioux general purpose helicopters. The Sioux was replaced from 1973 by the Westland Gazelle used for Airborne reconnaissance; initially unarmed, they were converted to carry 68mm SNEB rocket pods in 1982, during the Falklands War. The Scout was replaced from 1978 by the Westland Lynx, which was capable of carrying additional firepower in the form of door gunners.

Basic rotary flying training was carried out on the Sioux in the 1970s, on the Gazelle in the 1980s and 1990s, and is currently conducted on the Eurocopter H145/H135 through No. 1 Flying Training School RAF.

Fixed-wing types in AAC service have included the Auster AOP.6 and AOP.9 and Beaver AL.1 in observation and liaison roles. In 1989, the AAC commenced operating a number of Britten-Norman Islander aircraft for surveillance and light transport duties. The corps operated the DHC-1 Chipmunk T.10 in a training role until its replacement by the Slingsby T67 Firefly in the 1990s. The Firefly was replaced by the Grob Tutor in 2010.

==== Cold War ====
During the Cold War the majority of Army Air Corps units were based in Germany and part of the British Army of the Rhine. At the beginning of 1989 the Army Air Corps structure was as follows:

- Army Air Corps, Middle Wallop Flying Station
  - 1 Wing AAC, Hobart Barracks in Detmold, West Germany, under operational control of Commander Aviation 1st British Corps (Wing disbanded during 1989)
    - 1 Regiment AAC, Tofrek Barracks in Hildesheim, supported 1st Armoured Division
      - 651 Squadron AAC, (Anti-Tank, 4× Gazelle AH.1, 12× Lynx AH.7 (TOW))
      - 652 Squadron AAC, (Anti-Tank, 4× Gazelle AH.1, 12× Lynx AH.7 (TOW))
      - 661 Squadron AAC, (Reconnaissance, 12× Gazelle AH.1)
    - 3 Regiment AAC, Salamanca Barracks in Soest, supported 3rd Armoured Division
      - 653 Squadron AAC, (Anti-Tank, 4× Gazelle AH.1, 12× Lynx AH.7 (TOW))
      - 662 Squadron AAC, (Reconnaissance, 12× Gazelle AH.1)
      - 663 Squadron AAC, (Reconnaissance, 12× Gazelle AH.1)
    - 4 Regiment AAC, Hobart Barracks in Detmold, supported 4th Armoured Division
      - 654 Squadron AAC, (Anti-Tank, 4× Gazelle AH.1, 12× Lynx AH.7 (TOW))
      - 659 Squadron AAC, (Anti-Tank, 4× Gazelle AH.1, 12× Lynx AH.7 (TOW))
      - 669 Squadron AAC, (Reconnaissance, 12× Gazelle AH.1)
  - 2 Wing AAC, AAC Netheravon (Wing disbanded during 1989)
    - Northern Ireland Regiment AAC, AAC Aldergrove (Later renamed 5 Regiment AAC)
      - 655 Squadron AAC, AAC Ballykelly, (Anti-Tank, 4× Gazelle AH.1, 12× Lynx AH.7), supported 2nd Infantry Division
      - 665 Squadron AAC, (16× Gazelle AH.1), supported Headquarters Northern Ireland
      - 1 Flight AAC, (Reconnaissance, 4× DHC-2 Beaver AOP)
    - 7 Regiment AAC, AAC Netheravon
      - 656 Squadron AAC, (Anti-Tank, 4× Gazelle AH.1, 12× Lynx AH.7), supported 1st Infantry Brigade
      - 666 Squadron AAC (V), (Territorial Army, Home Defence, 12× Gazelle AH.1)
      - 2 Flight AAC, (4× Gazelle AH.1), supported NATO's AMF(L)
    - 657 Squadron AAC, Colchester Garrison, (Anti-Tank, 4× Gazelle AH.1, 12× Lynx AH.7), supported 9th Infantry Brigade; joined 9 Regiment AAC in July 1990.
  - 9 Regiment AAC, RAF Topcliffe, part of 24th Airmobile Brigade
    - 672 Squadron AAC, (Lynx Light Battlefield Helicopter Squadron, activated 1 January 1990, 12× Lynx AH.9)
    - 3 Flight AAC, (4× Gazelle AH.1)
  - School of Army Aviation, Middle Wallop Flying Station
    - 670 Squadron AAC, Middle Wallop, (Operational Training, 12× Gazelle AH.1, activated 1989)
    - 671 Squadron AAC, Middle Wallop, (Conversion to Type, 8× Gazelle AH.1, 8× Lynx AH.7)
    - Trade Training School (Ground Crew & Maintenance Training)
  - 660 Squadron AAC, RAF Sek Kong, Hong Kong, (12× Scout AH.1), supported British Forces Hong Kong, two Scouts detached to British Forces Brunei
    - C Flight, 660 Squadron AAC, Anduki Airfield in Seria, Brunei, (2× Scout AH.1)
  - 664 Squadron AAC, St George's Barracks in Minden, West Germany, (Reconnaissance, 12× Gazelle AH.1), supported 1st British Corps
  - Development & Trials Squadron, Middle Wallop Flying Station, (12× Gazelle AH.1, under Director Army Air Corps. On 1 April 1990 renamed 667 (D&T) Squadron AAC)
  - 7 Flight AAC, RAF Gatow, Berlin, (4× Gazelle AH.1), supported the Berlin Infantry Brigade
  - 8 Flight AAC, Stirling Lines, Hereford, (4× A109A Hirundo), supported the Special Air Service
  - 12 Flight AAC, RAF Wildenrath, Germany, (4× Gazelle AH.1), supported British Army of the Rhine
  - 16 Flight AAC, Kingsfield Airfield in Dhekelia, Cyprus, (4× Gazelle AH.1) supported British Forces Cyprus
  - 25 Flight AAC, Price Barracks, Belize, (4× Gazelle AH.1), supported British Army Training and Support Unit Belize
  - 29 (BATUS) Flight AAC, CFB Suffield, Canada, (4× Gazelle AH.1), supported British Army Training Unit Suffield
  - UNFICYP Flight AAC, Nicosia International Airport, Cyprus, (4× Gazelle AH.1), supported United Nations Peacekeeping Force in Cyprus

==== War on Terror ====
A further boost in the Army Air Corps' capability came in the form of the AgustaWestland Apache AH.1 attack helicopter, introduced in 2004. In 2006, British Apaches deployed to Afghanistan as part of the NATO International Security Assistance Force. In 2004, Britten-Norman Defender fixed wing aircraft were purchased for Afghanistan and Iraq.

==== End of fixed-wing flying, 2019–2021 ====
In April 2019, 651 Squadron personnel and aircraft, the Islander and Defender, were transferred from 5 Regiment to No. 1 Intelligence, Surveillance, and Reconnaissance Wing Royal Air Force. 651 Squadron continued to operate the aircraft until they were retired from service on 30 June 2021.

==== End of aviation support to BATUS ====
In October 2021, 29 (BATUS) Flight was placed in suspended animation, with the UK no longer providing BATUS with aviation support.

== Current structure and deployment ==
=== Mascot ===
The Army Air Corps adopted their first Corps Mascot – Zephyr, a bald eagle – in October 2011.

=== Training ===
The training of future Army Air Corps aircrew is delivered by the joint service UK Military Flying Training System. Elementary Flying Training is delivered at RAF Shawbury and Army Aviation Centre, Middle Wallop.

Training Units, Army Aviation Centre, Middle Wallop

- 7 (Training) Regiment AAC
  - 671 Squadron – Juno HT1
  - 673 Squadron – AH-64E Apache Conversion to type
- 2 (Training) Regiment AAC
  - 676 Squadron – Administration
  - 668 (Training) Squadron – Groundcrew Training
- 9 Regiment AAC, RAF Shawbury | Juno HT1 (Battlefield Helicopter Wing of No. 1 Flying Training School RAF)
  - 660 Squadron
  - 670 Squadron – Operational Training

=== Personnel ===
The strength of the Army Air Corps is about 2,000 regular personnel, of which 500 are officers. However, the AAC draws an additional 2,600 personnel from the Royal Logistic Corps, the Royal Electrical and Mechanical Engineers and the Adjutant General's Corps. Therefore, total related Army Air Corps personnel is around 4,600.

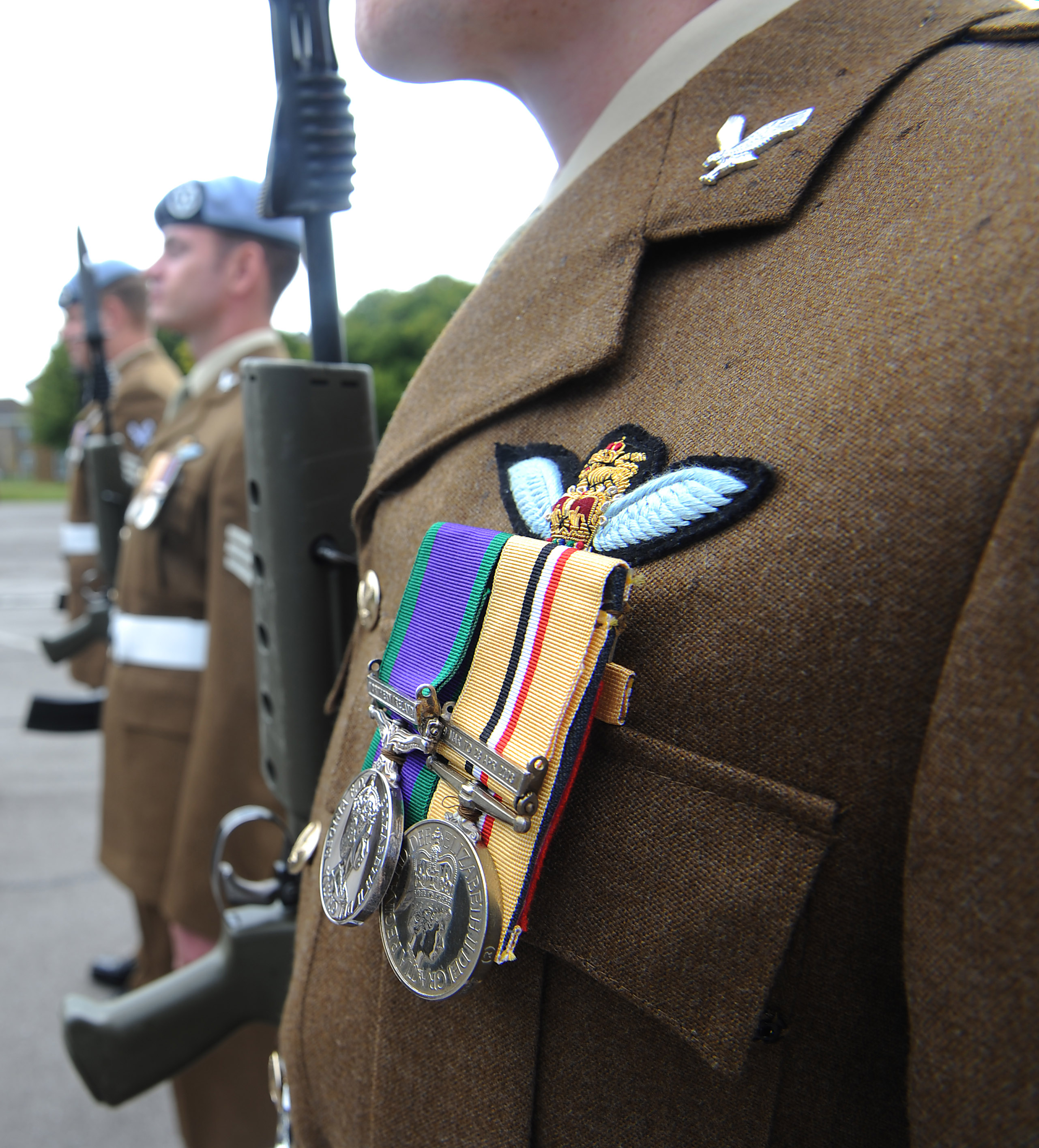
Army Air Corps personnel on parade, 2011

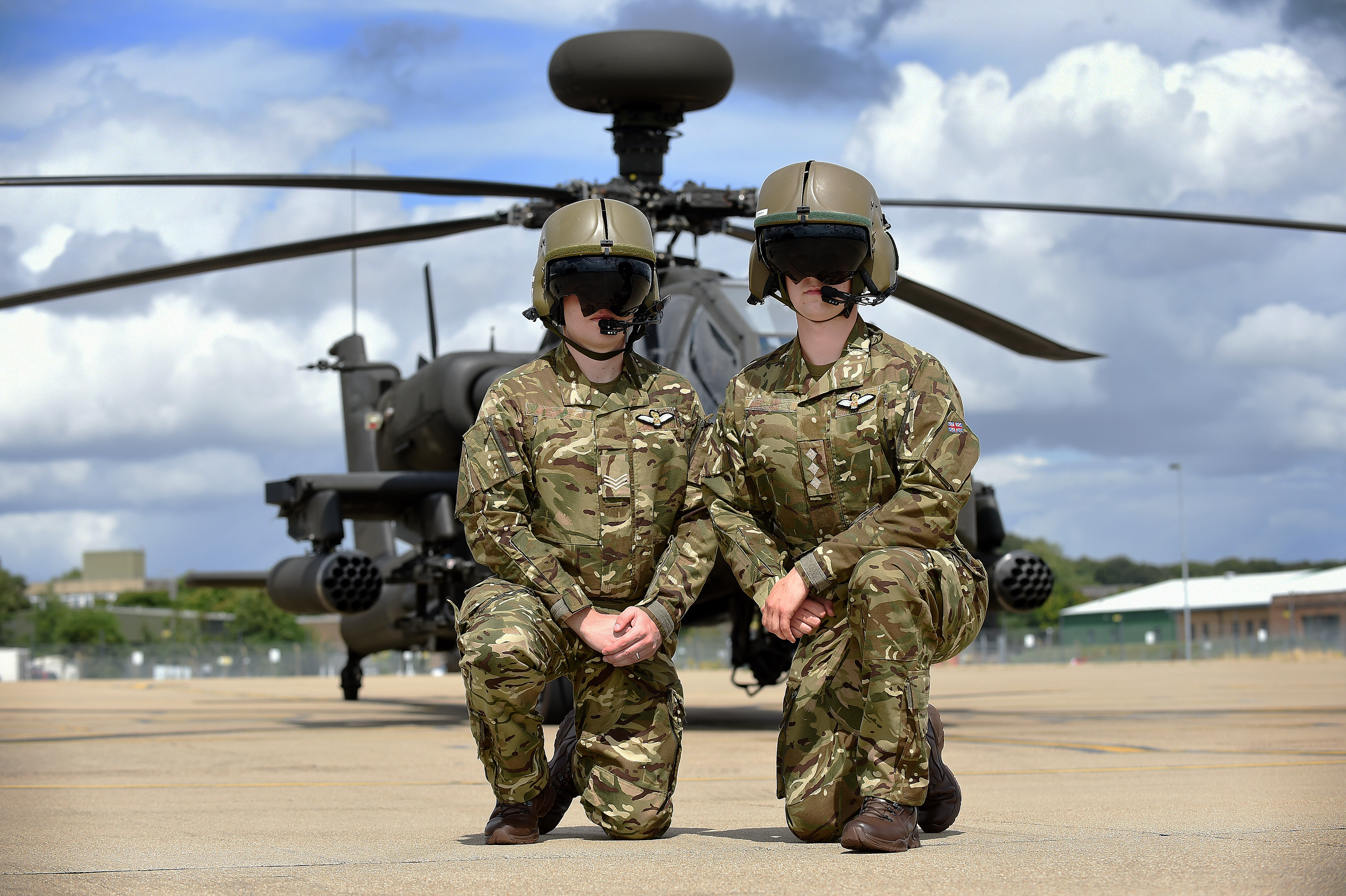
An Army Air Corps aircrew in 2016, wearing the newly issued flying uniform in Multi-Terrain Pattern which replaces the former one-piece flight suit

Other rank pilots in the Corps are initially appointed to the rank of Aviation Warrant Officer One (AW1) and can subsequently progress up to Aviation Warrant Officer Four (AW4)

=== Aircraft ===
Since 2019, the AAC solely operates rotary-wing aircraft operationally. Some fixed-wing aircraft are flown with the historic flight. The AAC uses the same designation system for aircraft as the Royal Air Force and the Fleet Air Arm. The sole fixed-wing trainer is the Grob Tutor, used for Army Flying Grading.

Circa 2023, AAC aviators fly four types of helicopter, and within each type there are usually several marks/variants which carry out different roles. Pilots train with No. 1 Flying Training School at RAF Shawbury. The school is a tri-service organisation consisting of civilian and military instructors that take the student from basic flying through to more advanced flying such as instrument flying, navigation, formation flying and captaincy. In service aircraft include the Airbus Helicopters H135 Juno, the AgustaWestland Wildcat AH.1, the Eurocopter AS365N3 Dauphin II, and the Boeing AH-64E Version 6 Apache.

In May 2023, the Royal Air Force took over the helicopter support role in Brunei and thus, the Bell 212HP AH1, previously in service, was retired.

In October 2023, the Gazelle helicopter was retired from service, after 49 years in the British Army.

In March 2024, the final Apache AH.1 was formally withdrawn from service. The AH-64E was declared "operationally ready" on the same day.

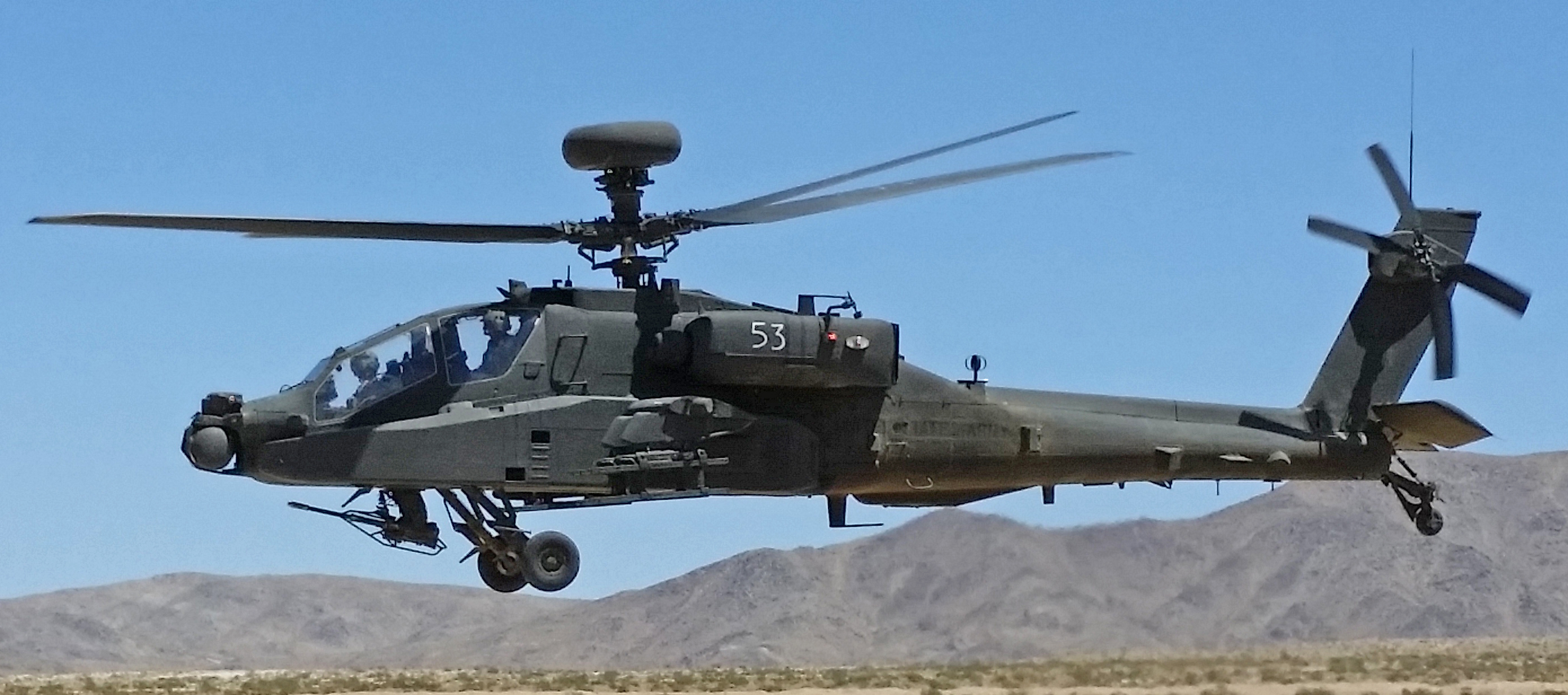
Boeing AH-64E Version 6 Apache

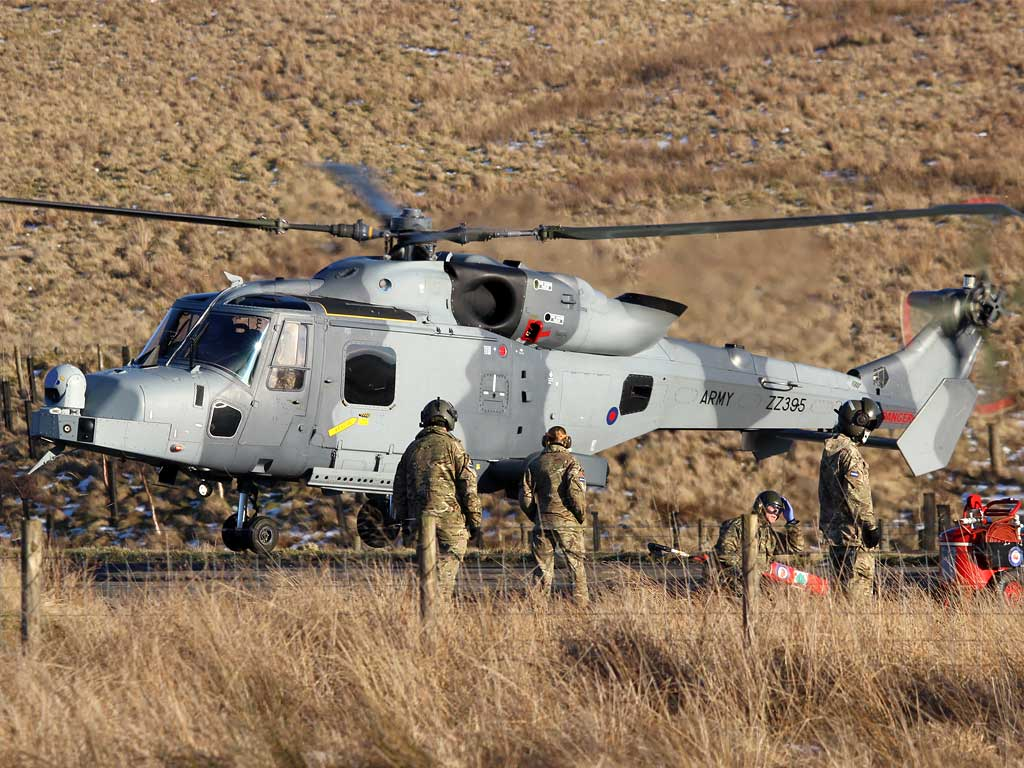
AgustaWestland Wildcat AH.1

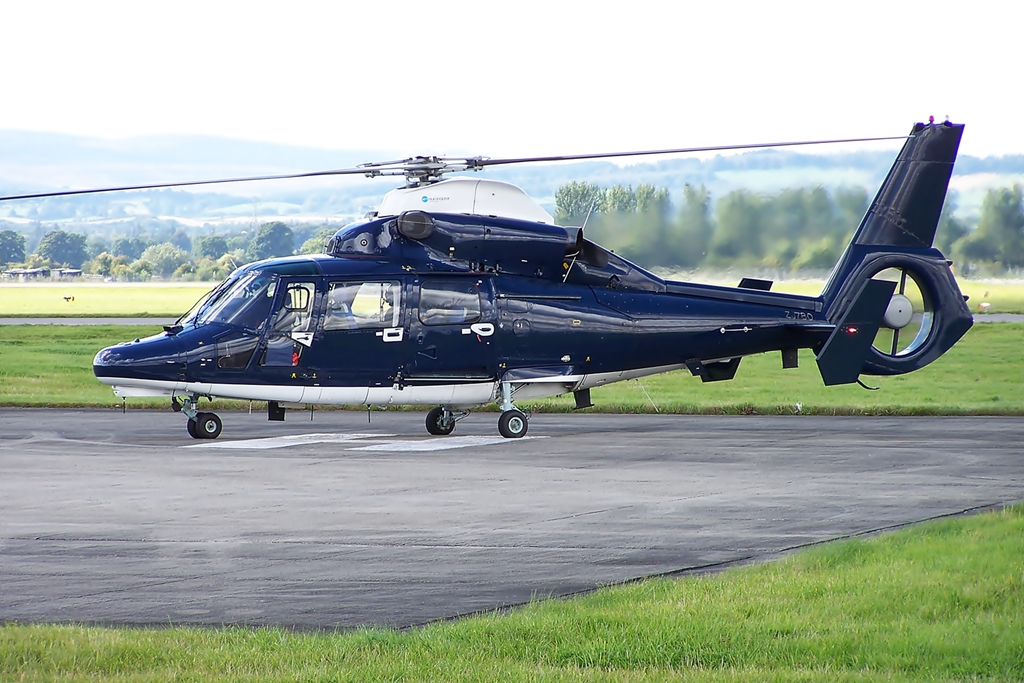
Eurocopter AS365N3 Dauphin II

=== Command and units ===
Bases of the Army Air Corps in 2020

Below is a list of Army Air Corps units as part of "Army 2020," about 2013:

- 1st Aviation Brigade
  - 1 Regiment Army Air Corps (AgustaWestland AW159 Wildcat), at RNAS Yeovilton (HMS Heron)
    - No. 651 Squadron – moved to 1 Regiment in 2021
    - No. 659 Squadron
    - No. 661 Squadron
    - No. 652 Squadron (Wildcat Fielding Squadron)
  - 3 Regiment Army Air Corps (Boeing AH-64E Version 6 Apache), at Wattisham Flying Station
    - No. 662 Squadron
    - No. 663 Squadron
  - 4 Regiment Army Air Corps (Boeing AH-64E Version 6 Apache), at Wattisham Flying Station
    - No. 656 Squadron
    - No. 664 Squadron
    - No. 653 Squadron (Operational Conversion Unit for Apache)
  - 5 Regiment Army Air Corps, at Middle Wallop Flying Station
    - No. 665 Squadron
  - 6 Regiment Army Air Corps (Reserve)
    - RHQ/HQ Squadron, Middle Wallop Flying Station
    - No. 677 (Suffolk and Norfolk Yeomanry) Squadron, Bury St. Edmunds
    - No. 679 (The Duke of Connaught's) Squadron AAC, Portsmouth/Middle Wallop
    - Aviation Specialist Group, Middle Wallop

==== Joint Special Forces Aviation Wing ====
- No. 658 Squadron (Eurocopter AS365N3 Dauphin II), at Stirling Lines, Hereford

==== Independent units ====
- No. 660 Squadron (previously part of the Defence Helicopter Flying School, now part of No. 1 Flying Training School RAF)
- Army Flying Grading (previously the Initial Fixed Wing Flight)

== Battle honours ==
The Army Air Corps is classed, in UK military parlance, as a "Combat Arm". It, therefore, carries its own guidon and is awarded battle honours. The honours awarded to the AAC are:

- Normandy Landings 1944
- Merville Battery 1944
- Rhine 1945
- North West Europe 1944 – 45
- Sicily 1943
- Pegasus Bridge 1944
- Arnhem 1944
- Southern France 1944
- Falkland Islands 1982
- Wadi al-Batin 1991
- Gulf 1991
- Al-Basrah 2003
- Iraq 2003

== Order of precedence ==
Preceded by Special Air Service	British Army Order of Precedence	Succeeded by Special Reconnaissance Regiment

== See also ==
- List of airfields of the Army Air Corps
- Army Flying Museum
- List of Army Air Corps aircraft units
- Joint Aviation Command
- Army aviation
- List of air forces

== Bibliography ==
- Farrar-Hockley, General Sir Anthony. The Army in the Air: The History of the Army Air Corps. Stroud, Gloucestershire, UK: Alan Sutton Publishing Ltd., 1994. ISBN 0-7509-0617-0.
- Flack, J. (1992). Today's British Army in Colour. BCA. ISBN 978-1854090065.
- Halley, James J. The Squadrons of the Royal Air Force & Commonwealth 1918–1988. Tonbridge, Kent, UK: Air Britain (Historians) Ltd., 1988. ISBN 0-85130-164-9.
- Jefford, C.G. RAF Squadrons, a Comprehensive record of the Movement and Equipment of all RAF Squadrons and their Antecedents since 1912. Shrewsbury, Shropshire, UK: Airlife Publishing, 1988 (second edition 2001). ISBN 1-85310-053-6.
- Mead, Peter. Soldiers in the Air: The Development of Army Flying. London: Ian Allan Ltd., 1967. OCLC 464211829
- Parham Major General H.J. & Belfield E.M.G. Unarmed into Battle: The Story of the Air Observation Post. Warren & son, for the Air O.P. Officers' Association, Winchester, 1956. (Second edition: Chippenham, Wiltshire, UK: Picton Publishing Ltd., 1986. ISBN 978-0-948251-14-6)
- Rawlings, John D.R. Coastal, Support and Special Squadrons of the RAF and their Aircraft. London: Jane's Publishing Company Ltd., 1982. ISBN 0-7106-0187-5.
