= Wattisham Flying Station =

Military airfield in Suffolk, England

Wattisham Flying Station
- Wattisham, Suffolk in England
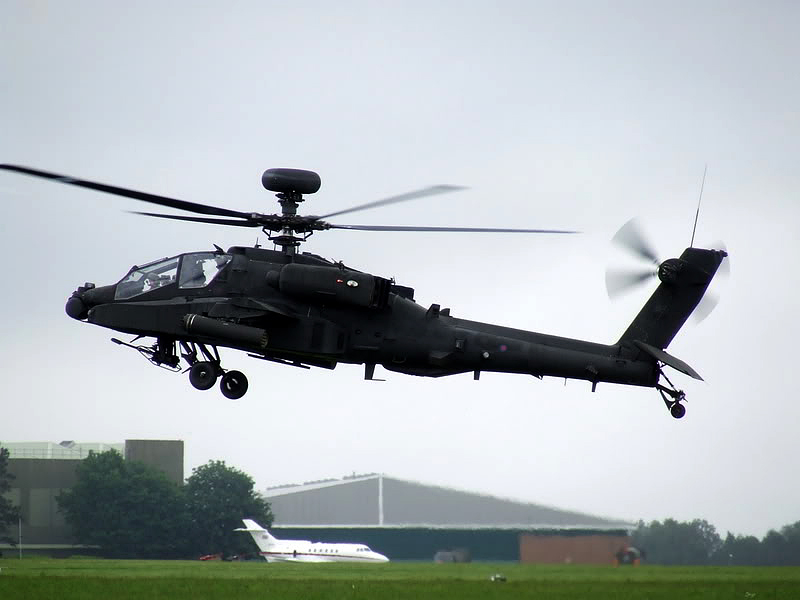
- An Army Air Corps Apache AH1 at Wattisham Flying Station

Site information
- Type: Army Air Corps airfield
- Owner: Ministry of Defence
- Operator: British Army
- Controlled by: Army Air Corps
- Condition: Operational

Location
- Location in Suffolk
- Coordinates: 52°07′37″N 000°57′21″E

Site history
- Built: 1913
- In use: Royal Air Force (1939–1942 and 1946–1992); US Army Air Forces (1942–1946); Army Air Corps (1993 – present)

Garrison information
- Garrison: 3 Regiment AAC; 4 Regiment AAC; 6 Regiment AAC; 7 Aviation Support Battalion REME

Airfield information
- Identifiers: ICAO: EGUW, WMO: 035900
- Elevation: 86.2 metres (283 ft) AMSL
Runways
Direction	Length and surface
	2,423 metres (7,949 ft) Asphalt
- Other airfield facilities: Dummy landing deck
- Source: UK Military AIP

Wattisham Flying Station, formerly Wattisham Airfield, is a British Army airfield and barracks located near the village of Wattisham in Suffolk, England. It is home to the Army Air Corps' Apache attack helicopter force. A helicopter repair facility provided by 7 Aviation Support Battalion, REME and 132 Aviation Supply Squadron, RLC is also based at the airfield.

Until 1992, the site was RAF Wattisham. The Royal Air Force (RAF) maintains a presence at the airfield with a section of survival equipment specialists who maintain survival equipment carried by Apache aircrew, including their helmets.

The airfield covers a site of 1,072 acres (434 ha), with approximately 2,000 troops stationed on site.

== History ==
Wattisham Airfield has had a long and distinguished history. First opening in April 1939, the airfield was used by the RAF before being lent to the United States Army Air Forces in 1942. After the Second World War, Wattisham became one of the UK's front-line air force fighter airfields during the Cold War, with aircraft on Quick Reaction Alert on a rotational basis with other UK fighter stations.

Wattisham used to house 'B' Flight, 22 Squadron Royal Air Force with its search and rescue (SAR) Sea King helicopters, until the privatisation of SAR provision in 2015, which led to 22 Squadron standing down. The closest SAR base under the new Bristow Helicopters contract is Lydd Airport in Kent.

As of 1 November 2018, there were 852 personnel assigned to 3 and 4 Regiments and 429 to 7 Aviation Support Battalion.

Apart from the military, the Anglia Gliding Club also operates from the airfield. (making it the oldest serving member of Wattisham, having been there as a RAFGSA club when the RAF occupied). Also resident is No 1287 Sqn, Air Training Corps.

There is a museum on site which tells the history of the airfield and this is open on Sundays during April to October.

== Operational units ==
Flying and notable non-flying units based at Wattisham Airfield.

=== Joint Aviation Command ===
1st Aviation Brigade Combat Team / Army Air Corps

- 3 Regiment
  - 653 Squadron – Boeing AH64E Apache
  - 662 Squadron – AH64E Apache
  - 663 Squadron – AH64E Apache
- 4 Regiment
  - 656 Squadron – AH64E Apache
  - 664 Squadron – AH64E Apache
- 6 Regiment
  - Headquarters Squadron
  - 677 Squadron

Royal Electrical and Mechanical Engineers

- 7 Aviation Support Battalion
  - HQ Company
  - 71 Aviation Company (Aviation Support Company)
  - 72 Aviation Company (Contingency Company)
  - 132 Aviation Support Squadron (Royal Logistic Corps)
    The Suffolk Police helicopter and the East Anglian Air Ambulance at Wattisham.

== See also ==
- List of airfields of the Army Air Corps (United Kingdom)
