= 3 Regiment Army Air Corps =

- 3 Regt AAC Tactical Recognition Flash
- Active: 24 October 1969 – present
- Country: United Kingdom
- Branch: British Army
- Type: Aviation
- Role: Attack
- Size: Regiment; 448 personnel (2018)
- Part of: Attack Helicopter Force
- Army Air Corps station: Wattisham Flying Station

Insignia
- Regiment badge heraldry: The regimental crest is the Army Air Corps crest with the roman numeral III beneath it.

Aircraft flown
- Attack: Apache AH-64E

3 Regiment Army Air Corps (3 Regt AAC) is a regiment of the British Army and is under the command of the 1st Aviation Brigade Combat Team within Joint Aviation Command (JAC). The regiment operates the Boeing AH-64E Apache attack helicopter, and is based out of Wattisham Flying Station. (Note: Also known as Wattisham Airfield. Prior to its take over by the Army Air Corps, it was the Royal Air Force Wattisham.)

== History ==
On 24 October 1969, the 3 Division Aviation Regiment was formed. At that time, it comprised the 653 Aviation Squadron (Netheravon), the 664 Aviation Squadron (Perham Down), the 665 Aviation Squadron (Colchester) and the 666 Aviation Squadron (Plymouth) as well as 2 Aviation Flight (Perham Down). On 1 January 1973, the regiment was renamed 3 Regiment Army Air Corps (3 Regt AAC) and each of its Aviation Squadrons were re-designated as just Squadron AAC.

Around 1978, the regiment was reformed at Salamanca Barracks in Soest, Germany where it was composed of the 653 Sqn AAC and 663 Sqn AAC. In 1982, the 662 Sqn AAC was reassigned from 2 Regt AAC to 3 Regt AAC and moved to Salamanca Barracks as well. During this period, the regiment operated Westland Gazelle AH.1 and Westland Lynx AH.7 helicopters with the mission of providing direct aviation support to 3rd (United Kingdom) Division (The Iron Division) (Note: It is not unusual to see the 3rd (United Kingdom) Division referred to as the 3rd (UK) Armoured Division. The 3rd (UK) Division is in fact an armoured division although, the current name no longer includes the word armoured.) in the British Army of the Rhine (BAOR). The regiment remained in Germany until 1992.

In the summer of 1993, 3 Regt AAC, then comprising the 653, 662, and 663 Sqns, was relocated to the Wattisham Flying Station, Suffolk in support of 24 Airmobile Brigade which was renamed the 16 Air Assault Brigade in 1999 and created from elements of 5 Airborne Brigade and 24 Airmobile Brigade. In 2005, all of the regiment's squadrons began converting from the Lynx to the Apache AH Mk1 attack helicopter.

In 2022, the Army Air Corps began to transition to the Apache AH-64E. The AAC received 14 of the new attack helicopters on 21 January 2022. The 3rd and 4th Regiments AAC had received 38 AH-64Es in February 2024. The British Army simultaneously retired the Apache AH.1 from service and declared the AH-64Es ‘operationally ready' in March 2024.

=== Deployments ===
Elements of the 3 Regiment AAC have been deployed multiple times since its formation. In its early history, elements of the 3 Regt AAC served roulement tours of duty in Northern Ireland and Belize.

1995 Operation HAMDEN

In August 1995, 662 Sqn was deployed to Croatia for a 3-month tour of duty as part of Operation HAMDEN in support of the United Nations Rapid Reaction Force to Croatia. Sqn 663 took part in roulement tours in Croatia at this time.

1996 Exercise MEDICINE MAN 3

662 Sqn deployed to Canada to take part in Exercise Medicine Man 3 during June and July 1996.

1997 Exercise GRAND PRIX 2

In January 1997, 662 Sqn deployed again, this time to Kenya, to take part in Exercise GRAND PRIX 2 with the role of supporting the 1 Royal Scots.

1997, 1999 Bosnia

Sqn 662 engaged in regimental training exercises to practice mountain-flying techniques at RAF Lossiemouth, Scotland in preparation for deployment to Bosnia in 1999. The squadron's tour in Bosnia lasted 6 months. 663 Sqn also took part in roulement tours in Bosnia in 1997 and 1999.

1999 Operation AGRICOLA

In 1999 the 653 Sqn deployed to Kosovo in support of Operation AGRICOLA, part of the UK's contribution to NATO's Operation Joint Guardian, the core of NATO's Kosovo Peace Keeping Force (KFOR).

2000 Exercise IRON HAWK

Mid summer, 2000, Sqn 662, Sqn 663, and elements of Sqn 653 deployed to the British Army Training Unit Suffield (BATUS) in Canada to take part in the training operation Exercise IRON HAWK.

2003 Operation TELIC 1

Between January and July 2003, elements of the 3 Regt AAC deployed to Iraq as part of Operation TELIC 1. This deployment included 12 Lynx AH.7/9 and 10 Gazelle AH.1 helicopters from 662 Sqn and 663 Sqn. (Note: Further reading History - Op TELIC Stabilisation Operations Apr/May 03)

2006 Exercise CRIMSON STORM

Exercise CRIMSON STORM was a two-week training exercise that took place in February 2006. Initial training for this exercise took place at the Stanford Training Area (STANTA). After initial training, the regiment relocated to Keevil Airfield from which it launched mock raids and reconnaissance (recces) missions onto Bodmin Moor. During this exercise, the regiment also conducted fighting in built-up areas (FIBUA) training on Salisbury Plain.

2006 Operation OCULUS

March 2006, as part of Operation OCULUS, the regiment deployed 5 Lynx helicopters and 80 personnel from its 653 Sqn for a six-month tour to Bosnia-Herzegovina. While there, they operated in Sarajevo and Banja Luka in support of the European Peace Keeping Force.

2012 - 2014 Operation HERRICK

Elements of 3 Regt AAC deployed repeatedly to Afghanistan as part of Operation Herrick. On one occasion, after returning from a four-month deployment in the Helmand Province, Afghanistan, the personnel of 662 Sqn were awarded Operational Service Medals. The award ceremony took place at Wattisham Flying Station on 9 May 2013, where Prince Charles, Colonel in Chief, Army Air Corps, handed the Operational Service Medals to the members of the squadron.

2018 Exercise TALON GRAVIS

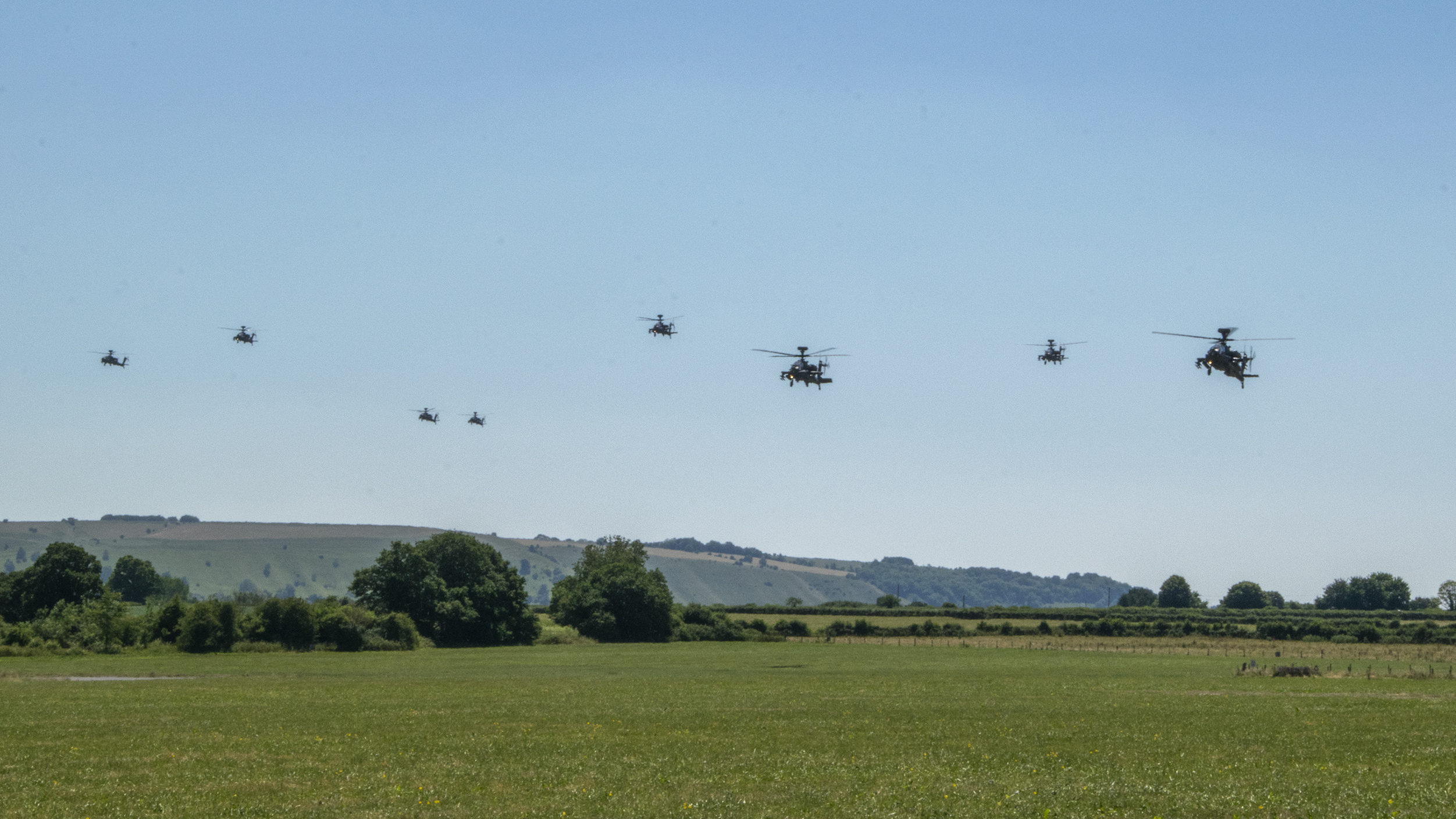
Eight Apache attack helicopters of 3 Regiment Army Air Corps during Exercise Talon Gravis, 2018.

In June 2018, 3 Regt AAC took part in Exercise TALON GRAVIS. Operating out of Wattisham Flying Station, this training mission pitted the regiment against simulated enemy air defenses and required the regiment to find various targets as far away as 300 miles away. The missions were flown by formations of up to eight Apaches during both day and night conditions. They even practiced replenishing at a Forward arming and refuelling point (FARP) at Keevil Airfield.

2019 Operation CABRIT

15 April 2019, Helicopters from the 663 Sqn left Wattisham Flying Station beginning a 3-month deployment to Estonia. There they joined Operation CABRIT, an ongoing operation in the Baltic states as part of the UK's contribution to NATO's enhanced Forward Presence (EFP). The addition of the 663 Sqn, boosted the UK's presence in the Baltic states to around 1,000 personnel making the UK the largest contributor to the eFP. During this deployment, 663 Sqn took part in Estonia's annual Exercise Spring Storm, a training exercise for the NATO allies.

== 3 Regt AAC participation in the royal wedding ==
During the royal wedding, members of 3 Regt AAC, under the command of Captain William Zehner, formed one of the five half companies that lined the route of the royal carriage. The half company consisted of one officer and twenty-four other ranks, drawn from each cap badge represented within the Regiment (Army Air Corps, Royal Electrical and Mechanical Engineers, and the Adjutant General's Corps).

== Prince Harry of Wales affiliation with 3 Regt AAC ==
Prince Harry 'Captain Wales' served as an attack helicopter pilot in 662 Squadron, 3 Regiment AAC, under the command of Lieutenant Colonel Tom de la Rue. The prince participated in various exercises, both at home and overseas, and deployed to Afghanistan with the squadron on Operation Herrick from September 2012 to January 2013. During his time in the regiment, he completed a series of tests to gain aircraft commander status so as to qualify to command single-handedly multi-ship and helicopter attack in missions day and night.

== Composition ==
The regiment consists of:

- No. 669 (HQ) Squadron AAC
- No. 662 Squadron AAC
- No. 663 Squadron AAC

== See also ==
- List of Army Air Corps aircraft units
