= Air observation post =

Artillery spotter aircraft

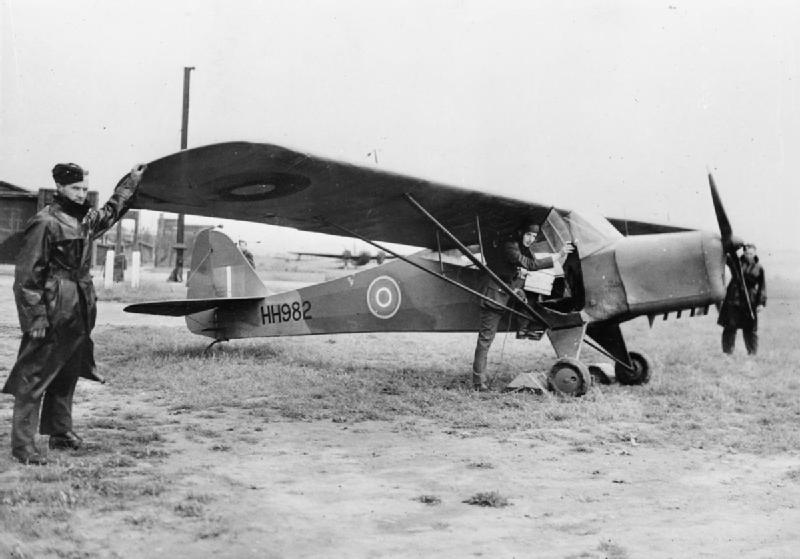
A Taylorcraft Auster AOP aircraft of No. 663 Squadron during training in 1941

An air observation post (AOP) is an aeroplane or helicopter used in the role of artillery spotter by the British Army and Commonwealth forces. In this role, either the pilot of the aircraft or another crew member acts as an observer watching for targets on the ground, and/or as a forward observation officer directing the fire, by radio, of artillery on the ground (or calling in tactical ground-attack aircraft).

== Background ==
In the interwar period, the role of artillery spotting was mixed with reconnaissance and ground attack to be served by Army co-operation (AC) squadrons. At the beginning of World War II their standard aircraft was the Westland Lysander. This aircraft had a high level of losses with the British Expeditionary Force during the Battle of France: 118 shot down out of a total of 175 deployed. This demonstrated the unsuitability of the Lysander for Army co-operation and called into question the whole concept. These RAF squadrons converted to fighter-bomber aircraft by 1941, dropping the liaison and artillery spotting roles.

== World War II: British development ==
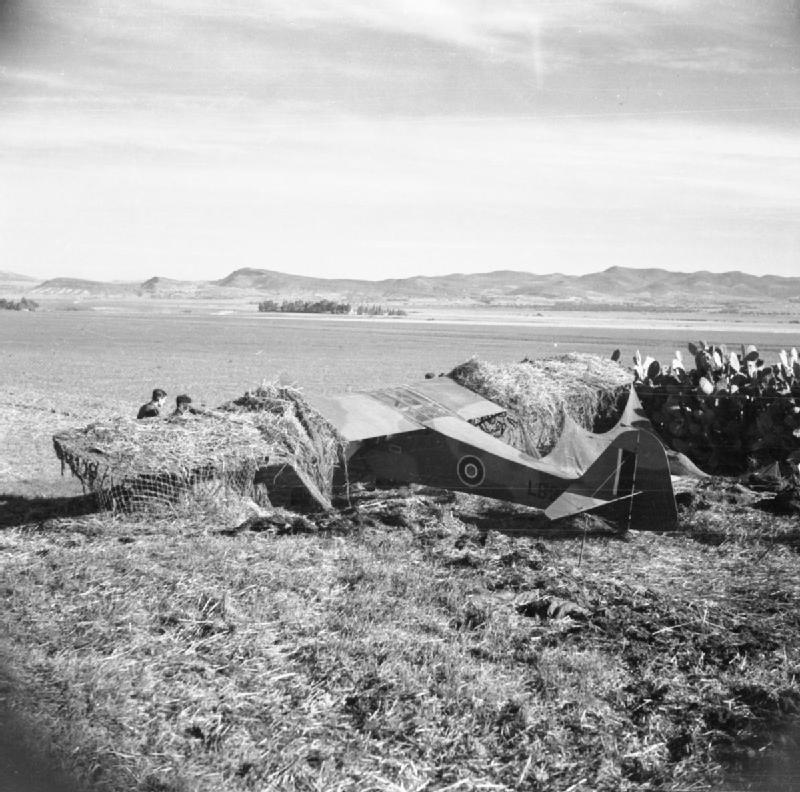
Removing camouflage from an AOP aircraft during the Tunisian campaign, 1942–43

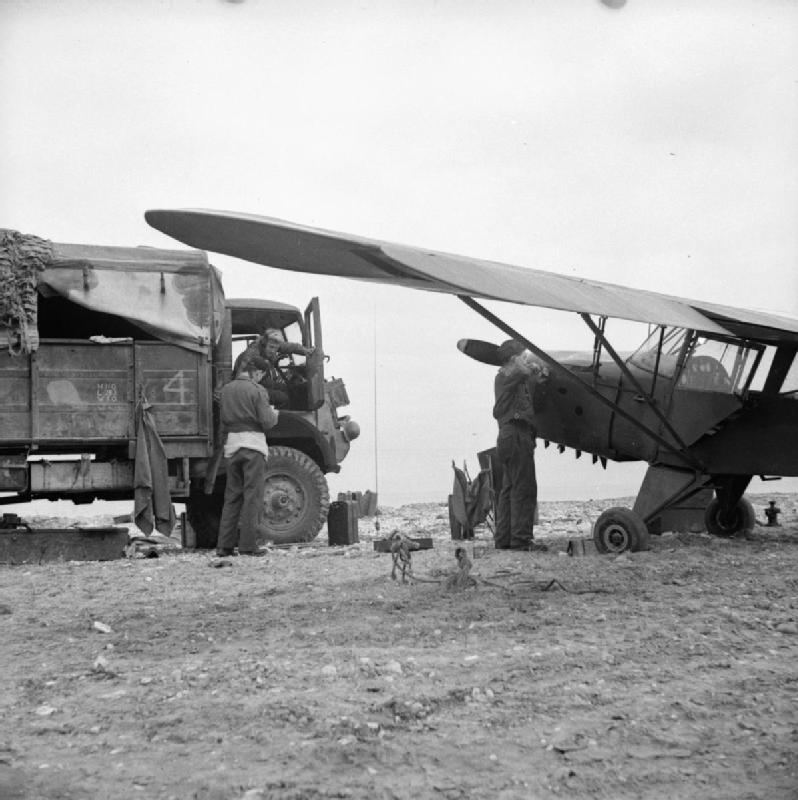
An AOP aircraft being prepared for a sortie during the Italian campaign, December 1943

The first of the dedicated air observation post units was established by Major Charles Bazeley of the Royal Artillery. Working as D flight of an RAF unit and equipped with the Taylorcraft Auster, they went to France in February 1940 to develop the role on the French artillery ranges, in liaison with the French Army. This training and development work had to be abandoned when the German blitzkrieg got underway and the unit was back at its UK base in Old Sarum, Wiltshire, by 20 May 1940. The flight had been ordered to disband, but the Army resisted this, and the intervention of General Alan Brooke, Commander in Chief Home Forces, secured the future of the flight and the concept of the AOP.

By 1942, AOP squadrons 651, 652, and 653 were in existence. Ultimately, the AOP units consisted of squadrons 651 to 662, 663 (manned by Poles) and 664, 665 and 666 (RCAF units with both Canadian and British personnel).

The key difference from the Army co-operation squadrons was that AOP pilots came from the Royal Artillery. The RAF provided the technicians to service the aircraft, and the equipment officers and adjutants. The rest of each unit was provided by the army, including signallers and drivers. A further unusual feature of air observation post squadrons was that all pilots were officers, and they were nearly all captains. Since most operations were carried out separately by individual flights, this lack of rank structure in squadrons tended not to produce problems.

During World War II, British AOP units used light, fixed-wing aircraft, almost exclusively several marks of Auster aircraft. The low speed, high manoeuvrability, small size (so aiding concealment at front-line landing grounds) and light weight of the Auster made this a much more suitable aircraft than the Lysander. The standard tactic of dealing with enemy fighter aircraft was to fly very low, normally around 30 feet above ground, around a hill or a wood. Although this also protected them from enemy ground fire, it resulted in many crashes into trees, poles, hills, cables and buildings. Casualty rates for AOP pilots turned out to be relatively low, compared to RAF pilots or infantrymen. One source of losses in combat was the aircraft being hit whilst flying through the path of outgoing shells. This was a particular hazard in intense bombardments: four aircraft were lost in this way during the crossing of the Rhine in March 1945.

== Postwar ==
An AOP flight operated during the Malayan Emergency, but was redeployed to Korea during the Korean War at the request of the 1st Commonwealth Division. Another flight was sent by sea from the United Kingdom with its Auster AOP.6 aircraft packed in crates. A single Cessna L-19 was loaned by the US Army and found to be superior by the British pilots. Although all of the aircrew were Royal Artillery officers, these two flights were the only RAF units to operate from mainland Korea during the conflict.

In 1957, the newly formed Army Air Corps was created from existing army units. Fixed-wing aircraft were steadily replaced by helicopters. The final AOP aircraft in British service was the Auster AOP.9, the last serving example of which was retired in March 1967.

== See also ==
- Forward air control
- Liaison aircraft
- No. 651 Squadron RAF

== Bibliography ==
- Parham, Major General H.J. & Belfield, E.M.G. 1956, 1986. Unarmed Into Battle: The Story of the Air Observation Post. Warren & Son, for the Air O.P. Officers' Association, 2nd edition ISBN 978-0-948251-14-6
