= Khaderan Singh =

Indian politician

Babu Khaderan Singh
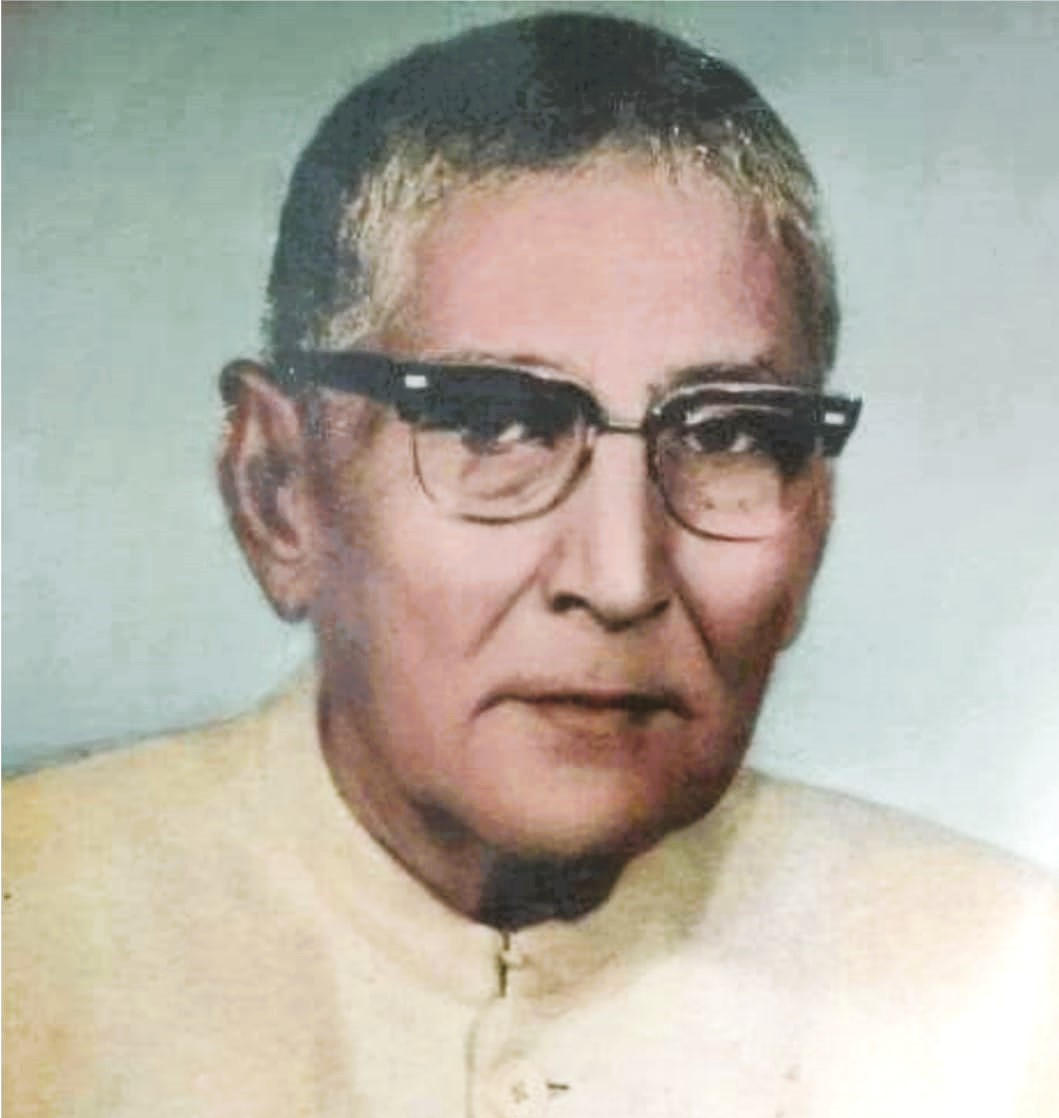
- Khaderan Singh

Member of the Bihar Legislative Assembly
- In office 1969–1974
- Preceded by: Mahabir Gop
- Succeeded by: Kailashpati Mishra
- Constituency: Bikram

information and tourism Minister Government of Bihar
- Tenure
- 22 June 1969 -- 4 July 1969

Urban development and housing minister Government of Bihar
- Tenure
- 2 June 1971 -- 9 January 1972

Chief minister bhola Paswan shastri

Personal details
- Born: 10 October 1899 Gorakhri Bikram, Patna District, Bihar
- Died: 20 August 1974 (aged 75)
- Party: Indian national congress, Indian national congress organisation, Bhartiya kranti dal

Khaderan Singh (10 October 1899 – 20 August 1974), also known as Khaderan Babu, was an Indian politician, Indian freedom fighter, philanthropist, social reformer, advocate, and former minister in the Bihar government. He was elected two times as a member of the Bihar Legislative Assembly representing the Bikram Vidhan Sabha constituency from 1969 to 1972 and 1972 to 1974.

== Early life ==
Khaderan Singh was born in Village Gorakhri in the Bikram block of Patna district. He was born to the Late Thakur Sharan Singh. He belonged to an agriculturalist family. He married Ram Sakhi Devi who fought the Zilla Parishad elections in 2001. He completed his schooling in Bikram and then pursued his graduation and L.L.B. degree from Patna Law College, Patna University. He began his career as a teacher and then he became an advocate in the Patna district court and later became a public prosecutor from 1957 to 1960 and again from 1960 to 1963.

== Political career ==
After completing his LLB degree, he got to known to the social and economic problems of farmers in his area. He started practicing in Patna district court in 1930. He then joined the Peasant Movement started by Swami Sahajanand Saraswati and became one of the prominent leaders of this movement in Bihar. He also participated in the Quit India Movement in 1942 and went to Jail for conspiracy against Britishers. Then he became vice chairman of the Patna district board for 6 years from 1942 to 1948. Then he became Chairman of the Patna District Board for 12 years from 1948 to 1960 defeating Ram Lakhan Singh Yadav also known as Sher-e-Bihar by one vote. Then he was elected as a member of the Bihor Legislative Assembly from Bikram two times. His first tenure was from 1969 to 1972 with the Bhartiya Kranti Dal, and his second tenure was from 1972 to 1974 with the Indian National Congress organization. He also served as an ex-minister in the Bhola Paswan Shastri government, holding the Information and Tourism Ministry in 1969 and the Urban Development and Housing Ministry in 1971.

== Contribution to the society ==
After becoming Chairman of Patna District Board he provided education and Jobs to 40 to 50 thousand people in various fields. By fighting the British Khaderan Singh head brought the Bakhtiyarpur-Bihar Light railway which was run by Martin Company under the name RD Light Railway) under the District board at that time Patna Nalanda were together and Khaderan Singh was its chairman. He made canals for farmers for irrigation. He laid a strong foundation of Educational Institutes right up to the village level for basic education secondary education and higher education. He opened P.H.C. in every grom Panchayat and made doctors and compounders available in it. He opened veterinary hospitals in almost all the Panchayat. He got all the big villages electrified in the 50s. Apart from constructing the main roads of Naubatpur Bikram, Bihta-Bikram, and Bikram-Pali, he laid a network of rural roads. Due to the sugar mill located in Bihta, the income and standard of living of the farmers of the area improved. In this, Khaderan Singh played a big role. S.D.O. offices of electricity, REO, minor, irrigation, and major irrigation were constructed under Khaderan Singh's tenure.

== Family ==
Khaderan Singh was married to Ram Sakhi Devi. They had five children three sons and two daughters. The eldest son named Dr.C. P. Sinha was a famous Doctor of Gaya, there is also a statue of him which was unveiled by the ex-minister of the Bihar government, Prem Kumar. The mediocre son's name is Ajat Shatru and the Youngest one name is Abinash Kumar who is currently doing social work for the welfare of society and is also a member of Indian national Congress.The eldest daughter's name is Pushpa Singh and the youngest Daughter's name is Sushma Singh, His granddaughter is Dr. Usha Sharma is a gynecologist, and obstetrician and served as vice president of Lok Janshakti Party Her husband Dr. R.B. Sharma was a most famous Neurosurgeon of Bihar. The grandson of his brother Justice Birendra Kumar is a currently Rajasthan High Court Judge but earlier was a Patna High Court Judge.

== Death ==
He died on the 20th of August, 1974 due to a heart attack at Patna Medical College and Hospital Patna .

== Remarks ==
There is a statue of him in the Patna District Court, which was unveiled by the former Chief Justice of the Patna High Court, B.C. Basak. There is also a statue of him in Bikram, which was unveiled by the former Chief Minister and Union Minister of India, Dr. Jaganath Mishra, the former Leader of Opposition and ex-minister in the Bihar government, Ramashray Prasad Singh, and ex-minister in the Bihar government, Budh Deo Singh. Additionally, there is a street named after him, Khaderan Singh Marg, in Kadam Kuan, Patna.
