= No. 669 Squadron AAC =

No. 669 (HQ) Squadron AAC 669 Aviation Squadron No. 669 Squadron RAF
- Active: 16 November 1944 – 31 December 1944 (RAF); 1 January 1945 – 10 November 1945 (RAF); 1 June 1971 - 1 September 1976; 1 April 1978 - 31 July 2016; HQ Sqn in 2021 into 3 Regt AAC
- Country: United Kingdom
- Branch: (United Kingdom) Army Air Corps
- Part of: 3 Regiment Army Air Corps
- Garrison/HQ: Wattisham Flying Station

No. 669 (HQ) Squadron AAC is a squadron of the British Army's Army Air Corps (AAC) which was disbanded as a flying Squadron on 31 July 2016 and reformed as HQ Sqn 3AAC in 2021. It was formerly No. 669 Squadron RAF, a glider squadron of the Royal Air Force active during the Second World War as part of No. 229 Group RAF, South East Asia Command

== History ==
=== Royal Air Force ===
No. 669 Squadron RAF was formed on 16 November 1944 at Bikram, Patna, British India as a glider squadron, with the intention of being used for airborne operations by South East Asia Command. However, after a short period it was redesignated No. 671 Squadron RAF, due to an earlier mix-up of squadron designations and bases. The squadron was reformed anew the next day, with the same role and at the right base, and continued to train, as part of No. 343 Wing RAF, until the surrender of Japan, when it became surplus to requirements. The squadron was disbanded on 10 November 1945 at Fatehjang, British India.

=== Army Air Corps ===
The squadron was reformed as part of the British Army's Army Air Corps as 669 Aviation Squadron at RAF Wildenrath under the control of No. 1 Wing AAC operating de Havilland Canada Beaver AL.1s and Westland Scout AH.1s. The squadron was renamed to 669 Squadron AAC on 1 January 1973 and was deployed to Northern Ireland for various times between October 1973 and February 1976. The squadron was disbanded on 1 September 1976 and became No. 12 Flight AAC.

The squadron was reformed at Hobart Barracks, Detmold, Germany on 1 April 1978, from 659 Squadron, 9 Regt operating the Scout AH.1, continuing with Northern Ireland deployments. 669 moved to AAC Wattisham during 1995 becoming part of 4 Regt and operating the Westland Lynx AH.7 and the Westland Gazelle AH.1 in the anti-tank role. The Gazelles were removed during 2007 and the squadron moved to 9 Regt. Its last base was Dishforth Airfield operating the AgustaWestland Lynx AH.9A until 31 July 2016.

For 15 months until November 2016 the squadron operated as the British Army Training Unit Kenya (BATUK) Aviation Support Squadron based at Nanyuki Airfield.

== Today ==
The squadron was reformed in 2021 to become the HQ squadron for 3 Regiment AAC.

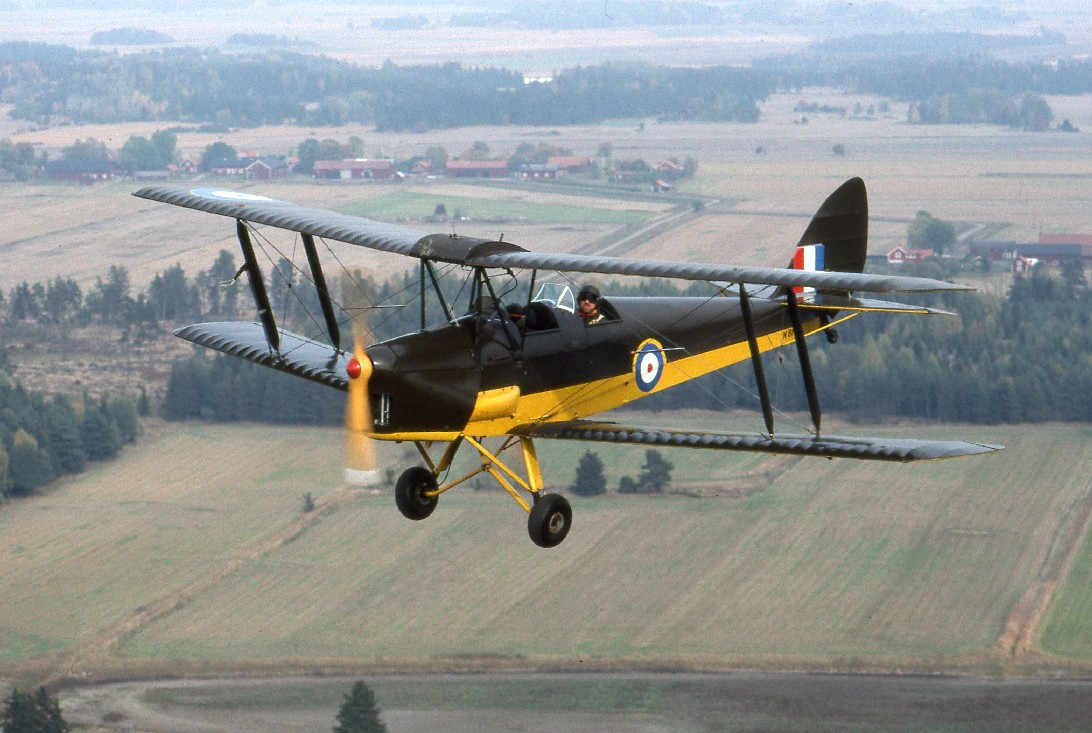
A de Havilland Tiger Moth restored in wartime colours.

== Aircraft operated ==
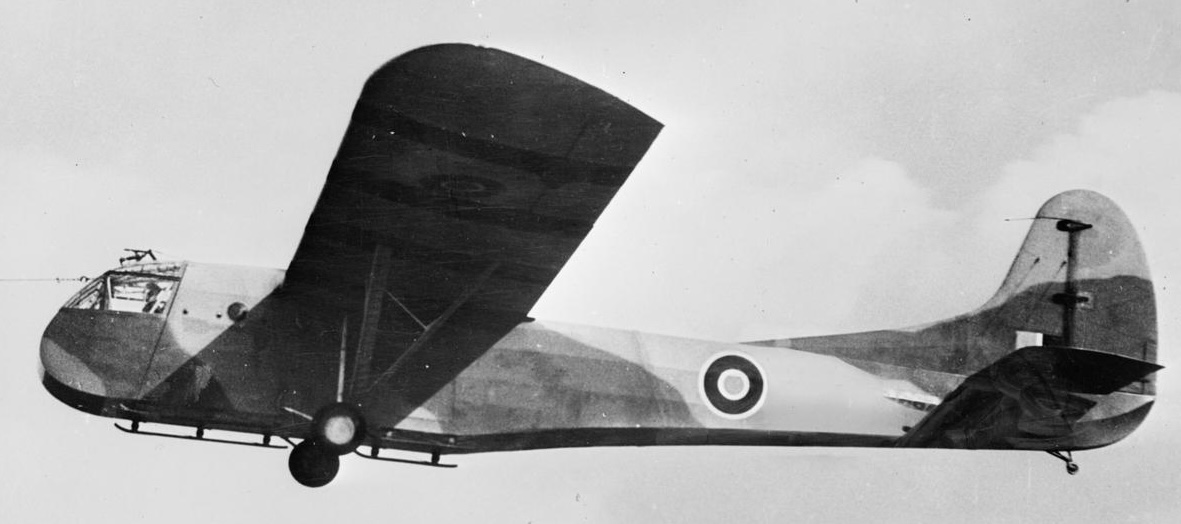
A Waco CG-4 (Hadrian) in British service.

Aircraft operated by no. 669 Squadron RAF, data from
From	To	Aircraft	Variant
November 1944	December 1944	Waco Hadrian	
June 1945	July 1945	Waco Hadrian	
July 1945	November 1945	de Havilland Tiger Moth	Mk.II

== Squadron bases ==
Bases and airfields used by no. 669 Squadron RAF, data from
From	To	Base
16 November 1944	31 December 1944	Bikram, Bihar, British India
1 January 1945	19 March 1945	Basal, Punjab, British India
19 March 1945	27 May 1945	Belgaum, Karnataka, British India
27 May 1945	23 June 1945	Upper Topa Camp, Punjab, British India
23 June 1945	6 July 1945	Basal, Punjab, British India
6 July 1945	10 November 1945	Fatehjang, Punjab, British India

== See also ==
- List of Army Air Corps aircraft units (United Kingdom)
