= Airborne Museum =

Airborne Museum may refer to:

- Airborne Museum 'Hartenstein', Oosterbeek, Netherlands
- Airborne Museum (Sainte-Mère-Église), France
