= No. 671 Squadron AAC =

No. 671 Squadron AAC 671 Operational Training Squadron AAC No. 671 Squadron RAF
- Active: 1 January 1945 – 25 October 1945 (RAF); 1 April 1986 – present
- Country: United Kingdom
- Branch: Army Air Corps
- Garrison/HQ: Middle Wallop Flying Station

No. 671 Squadron AAC is squadron of the British Army's Army Air Corps. It was previously No. 671 Squadron RAF, a glider squadron of the Royal Air Force active during the Second World War as part of No. 229 Group RAF, South East Asia Command.

== History ==
671 Squadron was formed at Bikram, Patna in British India as a glider squadron on 1 January 1945 by renumbering No. 669 Squadron RAF, with the intention of being used for airborne operations by South East Asia Command. It continued to train, as part of No. 344 Wing RAF, until the surrender of Japan, when it became surplus to requirements. The squadron was disbanded at Kargi Road on 25 October 1945.

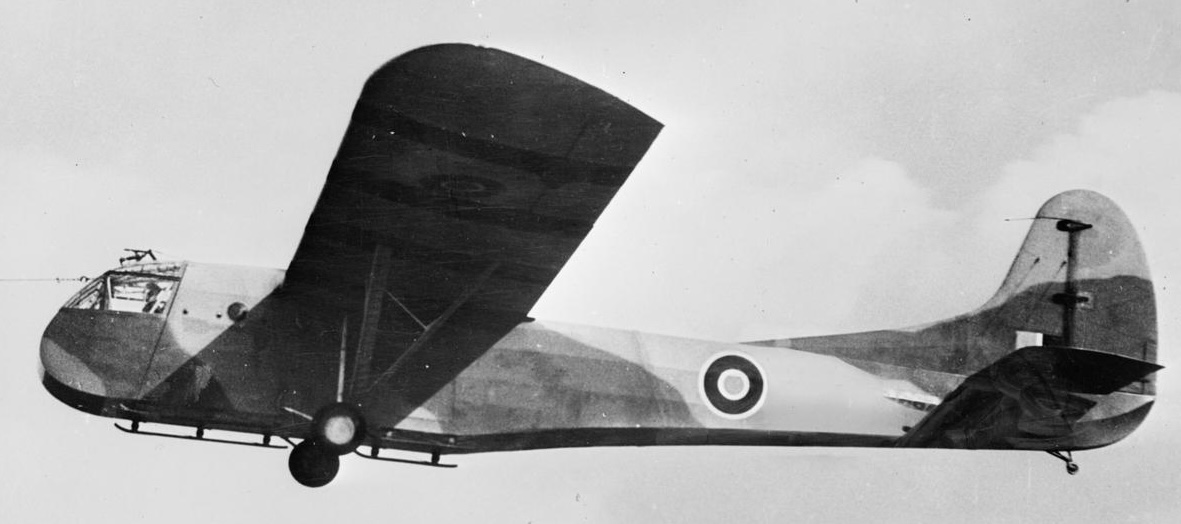
A Waco CG-4 (Hadrian) in British service.

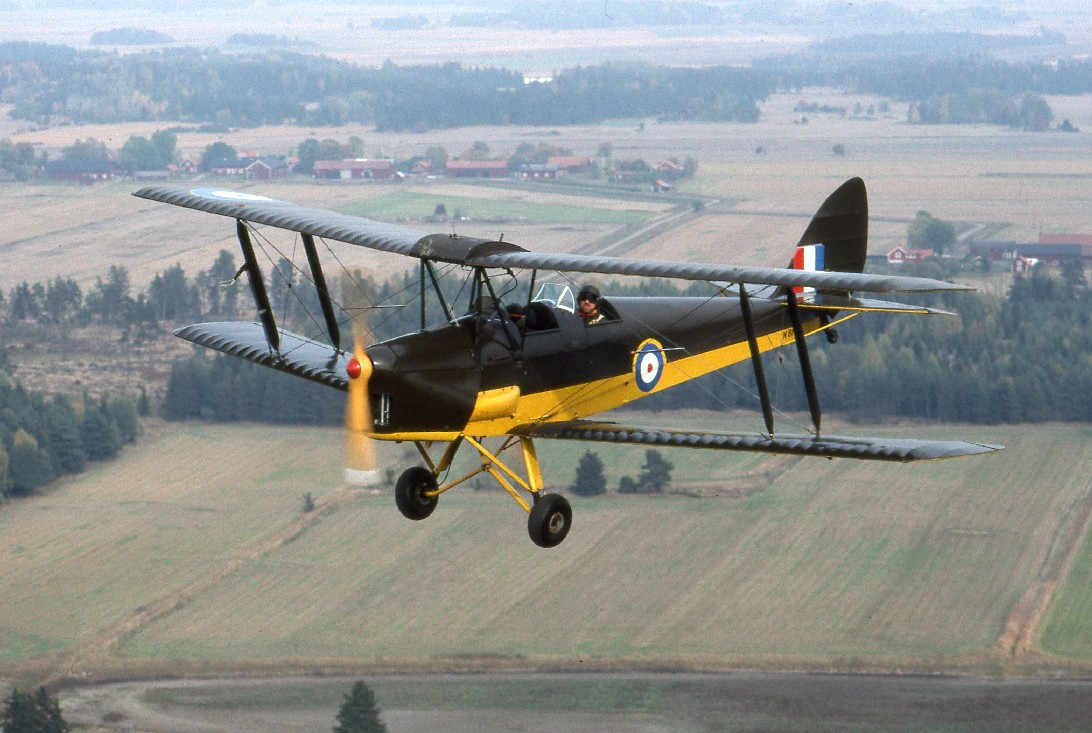
A de Havilland Tiger Moth restored in wartime colours.

Aircraft operated by no. 671 Squadron RAF, data from
From	To	Aircraft	Version
January 1945	August 1945	Hadrian	
January 1945	August 1945	de Havilland Tiger Moth	Mk.II

Bases and airfields used by no. 671 Squadron RAF, data from
From	To	Base
1 January 1945	9 February 1945	Bikram, Patna, Bihar
9 February 1945	3 April 1945	Belgaum, Belgaum district, Karnataka
3 April 1945	26 August 1945	Bikram, Patna, Bihar
26 August 1945	25 October 1945	Kargi Road, Bilaspur, Chhattisgarh

== Army Air Corps ==
671 Squadron was formed on 1 April 1986 at Middle Wallop as part of 2 Regiment AAC (Training). From 2000 it was operated Westland Lynx AH.7's, Westland Gazelle AH.1's and Bell 212 AH.1's. It joined 7 Regiment AAC (Flying) on 1 April 2009.

== See also ==
- List of Army Air Corps aircraft units (United Kingdom)
