= Mahabir Gop =

Indian politician

MLA, Bihar Legislative Assembly
- In office 1969–1972
- Preceded by: Ram Nagina Singh
- Succeeded by: Ram Nagina Singh
- Constituency: Maner
- In office 1967–1969
- Preceded by: Manorma Devi
- Succeeded by: Khaderan Singh
- Constituency: Bikram

Personal details
- Born: Maner, Patna, Bihar
- Party: Indian National Congress
- Spouse: LakhRajiya Devi
- Children: Indrasen Prasad Singh, Singhasan Prasad Singh, Raj kumari Devi, Bimla Devi
- Occupation: Politician

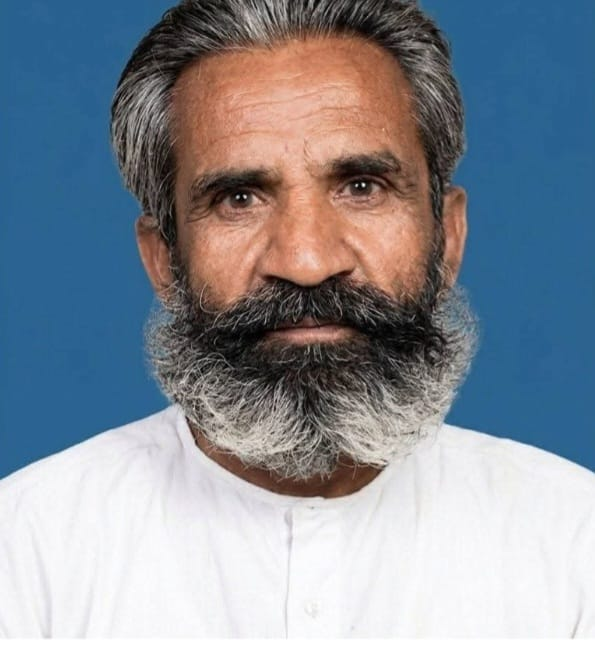

Mahabir Gop was an Indian politician. He was elected as a member of Bihar Legislative Assembly from Maner and Bikram constituency in Patna district of Bihar.

== Political life ==
Gop was elected as a member of Bihar Legislative Assembly from Bikram and Maner constituency in 1967 and 1969.

== See also ==
- Maner Assembly constituency
- Bikram Assembly constituency
