= Waco CG-4 =

American WWII glider

CG-4/Hadrian
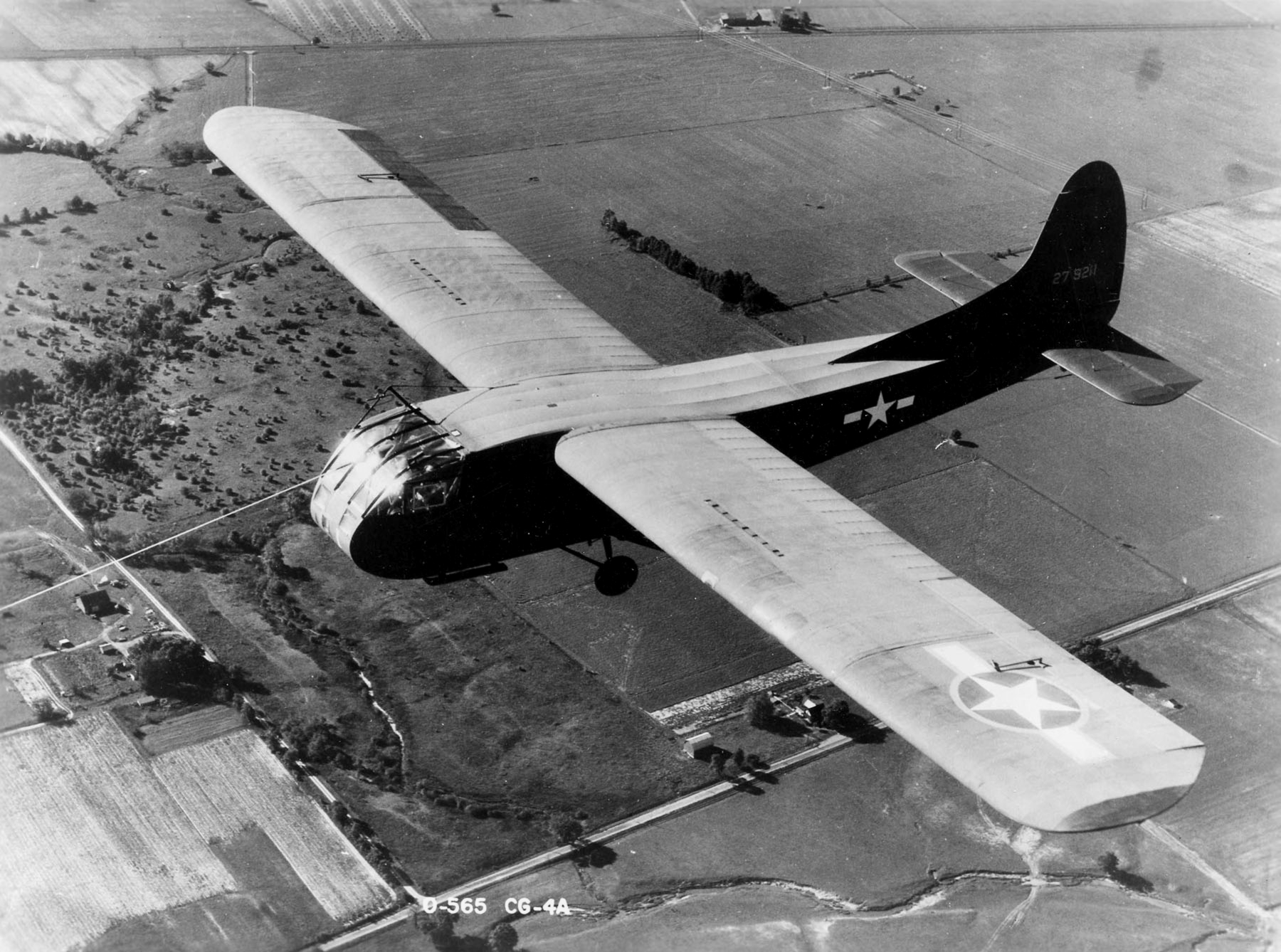
- CG-4A

General information
- Type: Military glider
- Manufacturer: Waco Aircraft Company
- Built by: Cessna; Ford; Gibson Appliance
- Primary users: United States Army Air Forces Royal Air Force; Royal Canadian Air Force; United States Navy
- Number built: 13,909

History
- First flight: 1942
- Variant: Waco CG-15

The Waco CG-4 was the most widely used American troop/cargo military glider of World War II. It was designated the CG-4A by the United States Army Air Forces, and given the service name Hadrian (after the Roman emperor) by the British.

The glider was designed by the Waco Aircraft Company. Flight testing began in May 1942. More than 13,900 CG-4As were eventually delivered.

== Design and development ==
The CG-4A was constructed of fabric-covered wood and metal and was crewed by a pilot and copilot. It had two fixed mainwheels and a tailwheel.

The CG-4A could carry 13 troops and their equipment. Cargo loads could be a 1/4-ton truck (i.e. a Jeep), a 75 mm howitzer, or a 1/4-ton trailer, loaded through the upward-hinged nose section. Douglas C-47 Skytrains were usually used as tow aircraft. A few Curtiss C-46 Commando tugs were used during and after the Operation Plunder crossing of the Rhine in March 1945.

The USAAF CG-4A tow line was 11/16 inch (17 mm) nylon, 350 feet (110 m) long. The CG-4A pickup line was 15/16 inch (24 mm) diameter nylon, but only 225 ft (69 m) long including the doubled loop.

In an effort to identify areas where strategic materials could be reduced, a single XCG-4B was built at the Timm Aircraft Corporation using wood for the main structure.

== Production ==
From 1942 to 1945, the Ford Motor Company's "Iron Mountain" plant in Kingsford, Michigan, built 4,190 CG-4A gliders (more than any other company in the nation) at a lower per-unit cost than any other manufacturer.

The 16 companies that were prime contractors for manufacturing the CG-4A were:

- Babcock Aircraft Company of DeLand, Florida (60 units at $51,000 each)
- Cessna Aircraft Company of Wichita, Kansas (750 units); the entire order was actually subcontracted to Boeing Aircraft Company's new Wichita plant.
- Commonwealth Aircraft of Kansas City, Kansas (1,470 units)
- Ford Motor Company of Kingsford, Michigan (4,190 units at $14,891 each)
- G&A Aircraft of Willow Grove, Pennsylvania (627 units)
- General Aircraft Corporation of Astoria, Queens, New York) (1,112 units)
- Gibson Refrigerator of Greenville, Michigan (1,078 units)
- Laister-Kauffman Corporation of St. Louis, Missouri (310 units)
- National Aircraft Corporation of Elwood, Indiana (one unit, at an astronomical $1,741,809)
- Northwestern Aeronautical Corporation of Minneapolis, Minnesota (1,510 units)
- Pratt-Read of Deep River, Connecticut (956 units)
- Ridgefield Manufacturing Company of Ridgefield, New Jersey (156 units)
- Robertson Aircraft Corporation of St. Louis, Missouri (170 units)
- Timm Aircraft Company of Van Nuys, California (434 units)
- Waco Aircraft Company of Troy, Ohio (1,074 [999] units at $19,367 each)
- Ward Furniture Company of Fort Smith, Arkansas (7 units)

The factories ran 24-hour shifts to build the gliders. One night-shift worker in the Wicks Aircraft Company factory in Kansas City wrote,

On one side of the huge bricked-in room is a fan running, on the other a cascade of water to keep the air from becoming too saturated with paint. The men man the paint sprayers covering the huge wings of the glider with the Khaki or Blue and finishing it off with that thrilling white star enclosed in a blue circle that is winging its way around the world for victory ... The wings are first covered with a canvas fabric stretched on like wallpaper over plywood then every seam, hold, open place, closed place, and edge is taped down with the all adhesive dope that not only makes the wings airtight, but covers my hands, my slacks, my eyebrows, my hair, and my tools with a fast-drying coat that peels off like nail polish or rubs off with a thinner that burns like Hell.

== Operational history ==
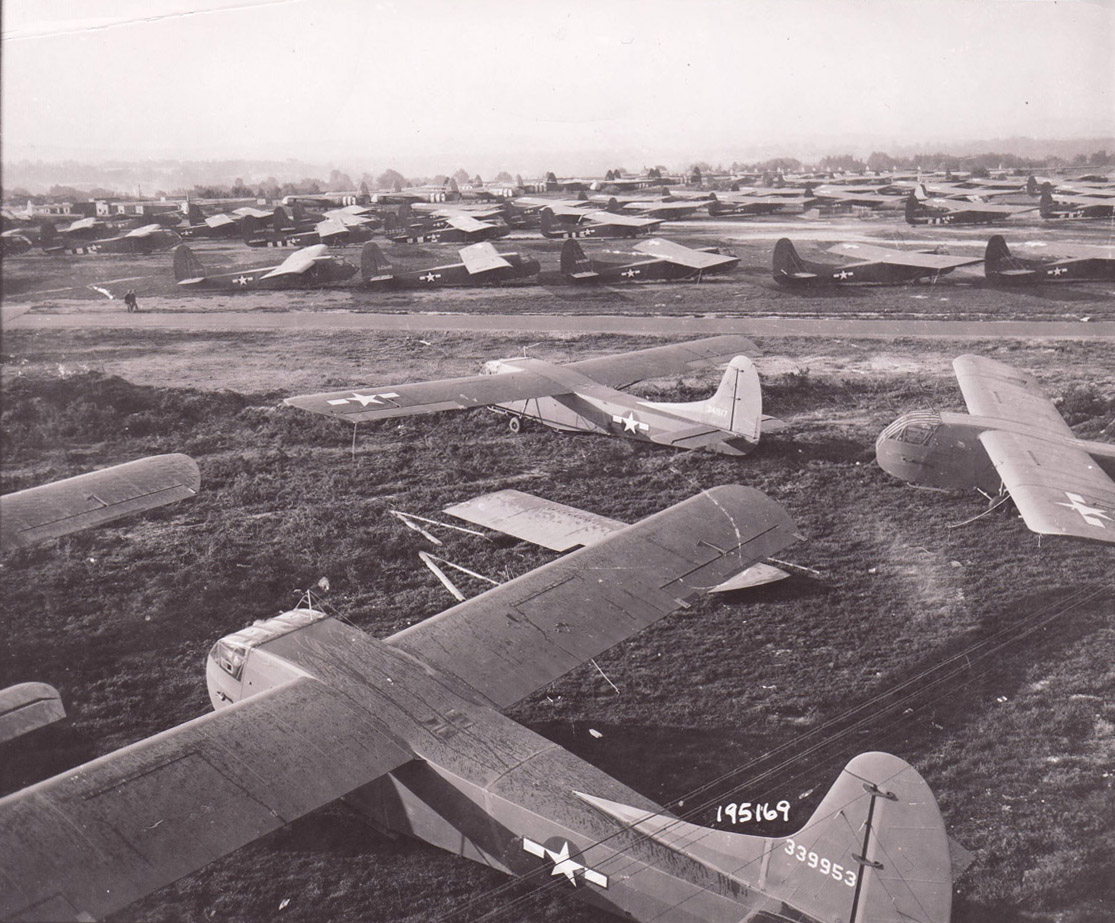
During Operation Market-Garden, Waco gliders are lined up on an English airfield in preparation for the next lift to the Netherlands.

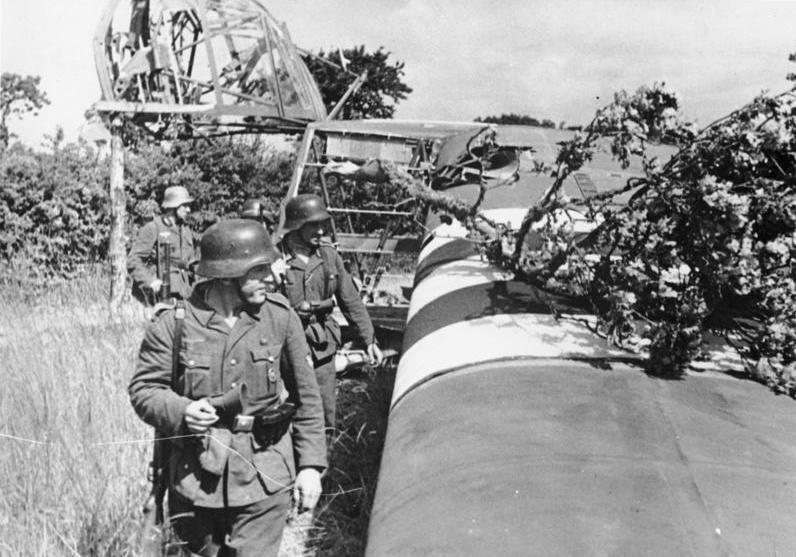
German troops examine an abandoned Waco, Normandy, June 1944

Sedalia Glider Base was originally activated on 6 August 1942. In November 1942 the installation became Sedalia Army Air Field, (after the war would be renamed Whiteman Air Force Base) and was assigned to the 12th Troop Carrier Command of the United States Army Air Forces. The field served as a training site for glider pilots and paratroopers. Assigned aircraft included the CG-4A glider, Curtiss C-46 Commando, and Douglas C-47 Skytrain. The C-46 was not used as a glider tug in combat, however, until Operation Plunder (the crossing of the Rhine) in March 1945.

CG-4As went into operation in July 1943 during the Allied invasion of Sicily. They were flown 450 miles across the Mediterranean from North Africa for the night-time assaults such as Operation Ladbroke. Inexperience and poor conditions contributed to the heavy losses. They participated in the American airborne landings in Normandy on 6 June 1944, and in other important airborne operations in Europe and in the China Burma India Theater. Although not the intention of the Army Air Forces, gliders were generally considered expendable by high-ranking European theater officers and combat personnel and were abandoned or destroyed after landing. While equipment and methods for extracting flyable gliders were developed and delivered to Europe, half of that equipment was rendered unavailable by certain higher-ranked officers. Despite this lack of support for the recovery system, several gliders were recovered from Normandy and even more from Operation Market Garden in the Netherlands and Wesel, Germany.

The CG-4A found favor where its small size was a benefit. The larger British Airspeed Horsa could carry more troopers (seating for 28 or a jeep or an anti-tank gun), and the British General Aircraft Hamilcar could carry 7 tons (enough for a light tank), but the CG-4A could land in smaller spaces. In addition, by using a fairly simple grapple system, an in-flight C-47 equipped with a tail hook and rope braking drum could "pick up" a CG-4A waiting on the ground. The system was used in the 1945 high-elevation rescue of the survivors of the Gremlin Special 1945 crash, in a mountain valley of New Guinea.

The CG-4A was also used to send supplies to partisans in Yugoslavia.

After World War II ended, most of the remaining CG-4As were declared surplus and almost all were sold. Many were bought for the wood in the large shipping boxes. Others were bought for conversion to towed camping homes with the wing and tail end cut off and being towed by the rear section and others sold for hunting cabins and lake side vacation cabins.

The last known use of the CG-4A was in the early 1950s by the USAF with an Arctic detachment aiding scientific research. The CG-4As were used for getting personnel down to, and up from, floating ice floes, with the glider being towed out, released for landing, and then picked up later by the same type of aircraft, using the hook and line method developed during World War II. The only modification to the CG-4A was the fitting of wide skis in place of the landing gear for landing on the Arctic ice floes.

== Variants ==
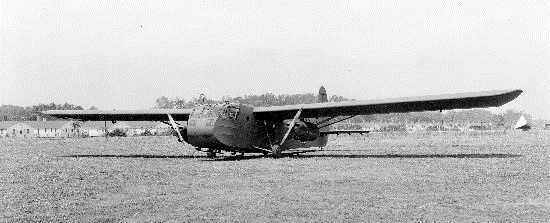
The XPG-1 prototype

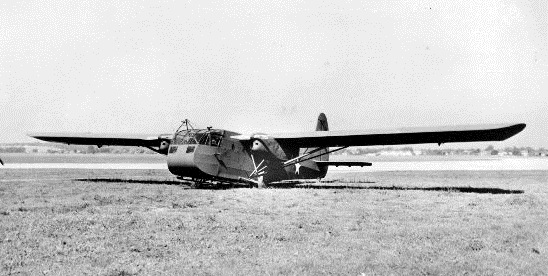
The XPG-2 prototype

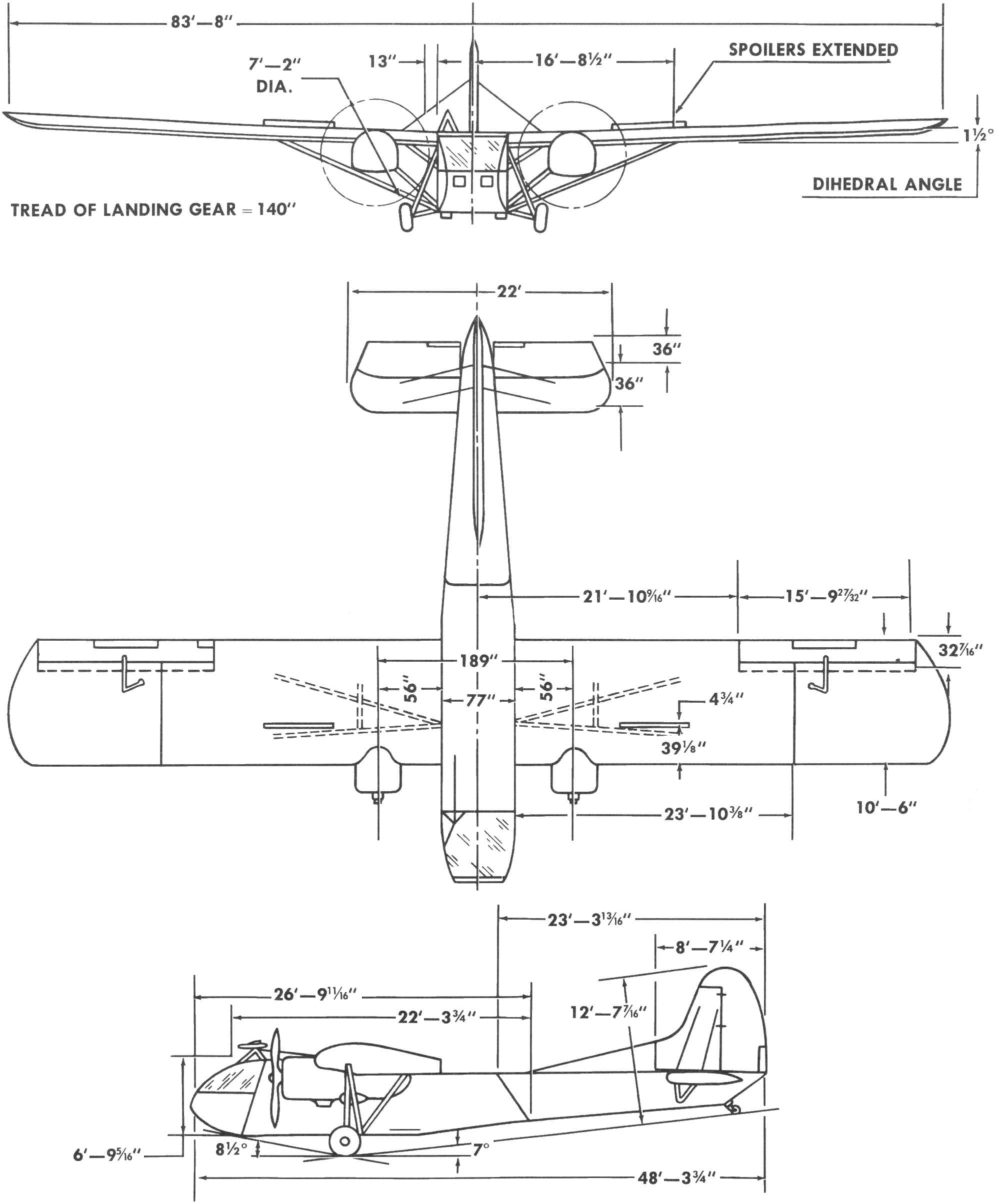
A 3-view line drawing of the PG-2A

XCG-4
Prototypes, two built, plus one stress test article
CG-4A
Main production variant, survivors became G-4A in 1948, 13,903 built by 16 contractors
XCG-4B
One Timm-built CG-4A with a plywood structure
XPG-1
One CG-4A converted with two Franklin 6AC-298-N3 engines by Northwestern
XPG-2
One CG-4A converted with two 175 hp (130 kW) Ranger L-440-1 engines by Ridgefield
XPG-2A
Two articles: XPG-2 engines changed to 200 hp (150 kW) plus one CG-4A converted also with 200 hp (150 kW) engines
PG-2A
Production PG-2A with two 200 hp (150 kW) L-440-7s, redesignated G-2A in 1948, 10 built by Northwestern
XPG-2B
Cancelled variant with two R-775-9 engines
LRW-1
CG-4A transferred to the United States Navy (13 units)
G-2A
PG-2A re-designated in 1948
G-4A
CG-4A re-designated in 1948
G-4C
G-4A with different tow-bar, 35 conversions
Waco
Royal Air Force designation for the standard US CG-4A.

Hadrian Mk.I
British designation for CG-4A Waco gliders allotted to the RAF and modified in the UK for British equipment requirements.

Hadrian Mk.II
British designation for CG-4A Waco gliders delivered directly from the United States to India and South East Asia, to distinguish them from gliders delivered to the UK as Hadrian Mk.I.

== Operators ==
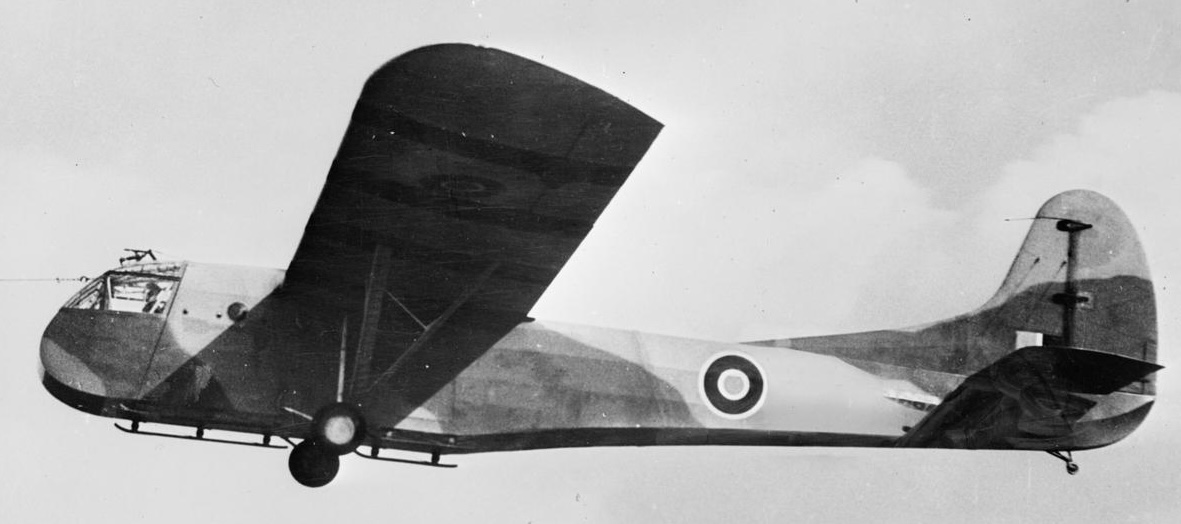
A British Hadrian

Canada

- Royal Canadian Air Force

Czechoslovakia

- Czechoslovak Air Force operated 2 Wacos, designated NK-4

United Kingdom

- Army Air Corps
  - Glider Pilot Regiment
- Royal Air Force
  - No. 668 Squadron RAF
  - No. 669 Squadron RAF
  - No. 670 Squadron RAF
  - No. 671 Squadron RAF
  - No. 672 Squadron RAF
  - No. 673 Squadron RAF

United States

- United States Army Air Forces
- United States Navy

== Accidents and incidents ==
- 1 August 1943: CG-4A-RO 42-78839, built by contractor Robertson Aircraft Corporation, lost its right wing and plummeted to earth immediately after release by a tow airplane over Lambert Field, St. Louis, Missouri, USA. Several thousand spectators had gathered for the first public demonstration of the St. Louis-built glider, which was flown by 2 USAAF crewmen and carried St. Louis mayor William D. Becker, Robertson Aircraft co-founder Maj. William B. Robertson, and 6 other VIP passengers; all 10 occupants perished in the crash. The accident was attributed to the failure of a defective wing strut fitting that had been provided by a subcontractor; the post-crash investigation indicted Robertson Aircraft for lax quality control; several inspectors were relieved of duty.

== Surviving aircraft ==
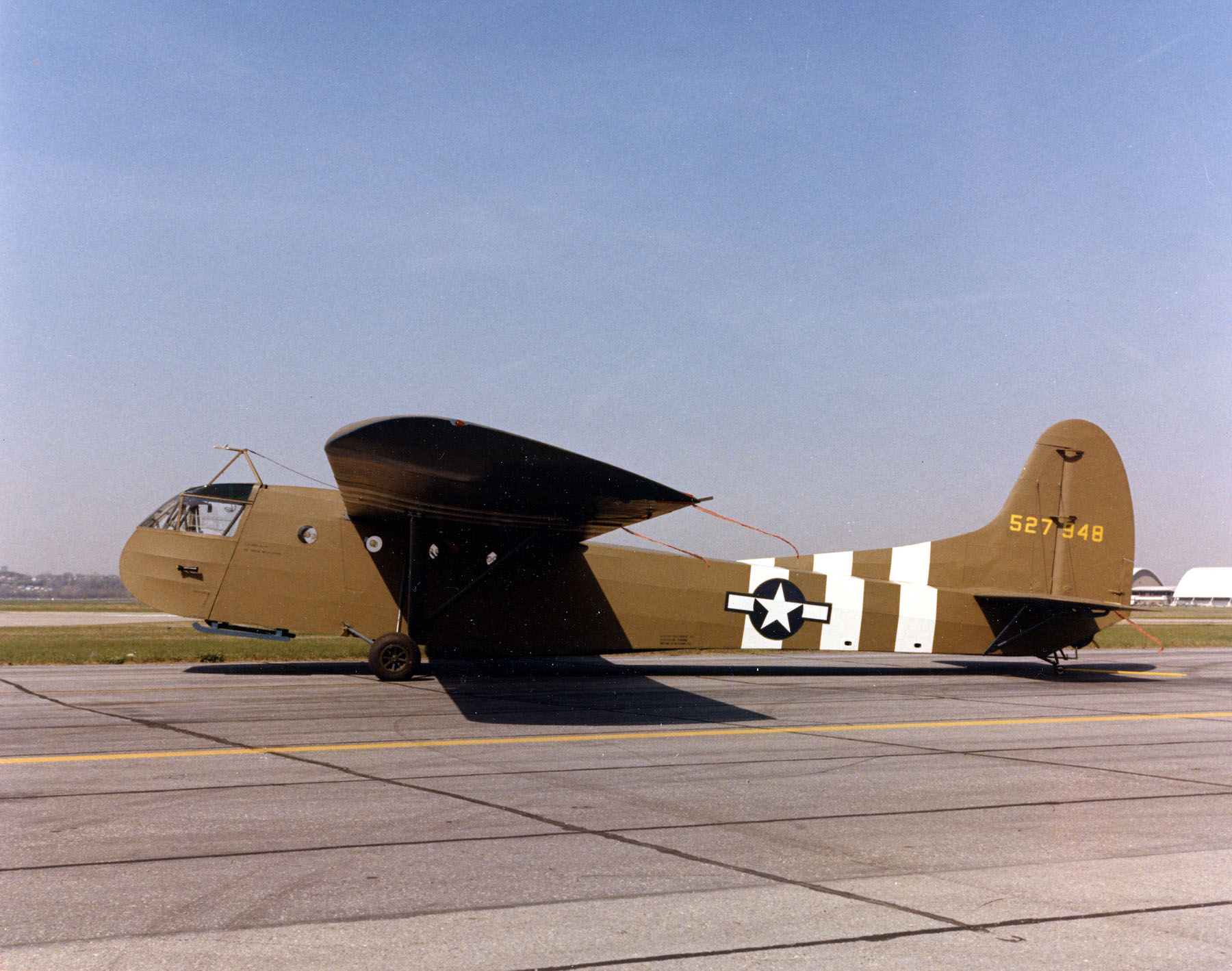
Waco CG-4A-GN, 45-27948 at the National Museum of the United States Air Force, 2006

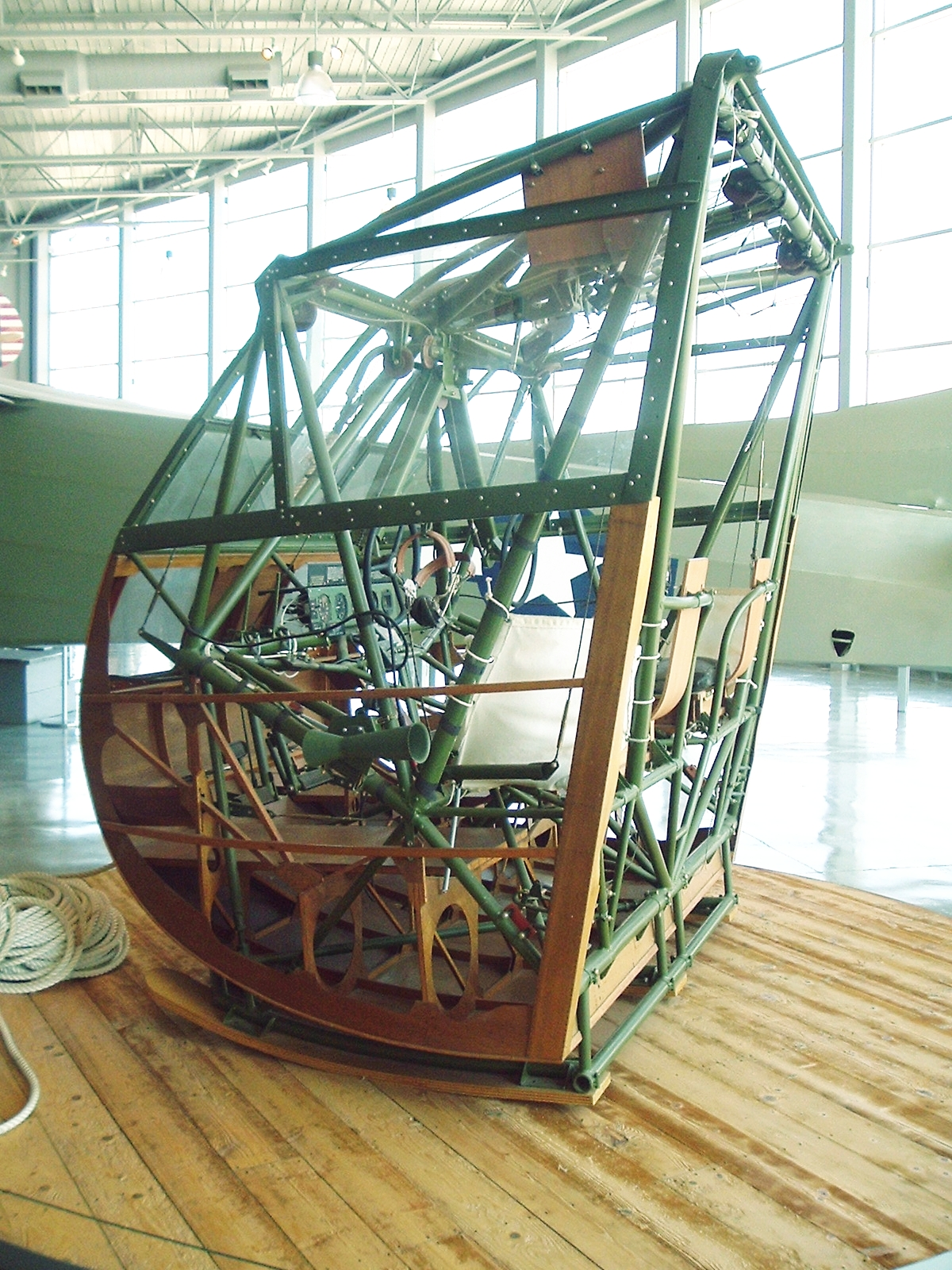
Cockpit of a CG-4A at the Silent Wings Museum, 2008

=== France ===
- 45-17241 – on display at the Airborne Museum in Sainte-Mère-Église, Normandy.

=== United Kingdom ===
- 42-43809 – on display at the Army Flying Museum in Middle Wallop, Hampshire.
- Unknown – on display at the Assault Glider Trust in Shawbury, Shropshire.
- Unknown – on display at the Yorkshire Air Museum in Elvington, Yorkshire.

=== United States ===
- 45-13696 – under restoration at the Yanks Air Museum in Chino, California.
- 45-14647 – cockpit section on display at the Pima Air & Space Museum in Tucson, Arizona.
- 45-15009 – on display at the Air Mobility Command Museum at Dover Air Force Base near Dover, Delaware.
- 45-15574 – on display at the Cradle of Aviation Museum in Garden City, New York.
- 45-15691 – on display at the Silent Wings Museum in Lubbock, Texas. The museum also has a cockpit on display.
- 45-15965 – on display at the Kalamazoo Air Zoo in Portage, Michigan. It is painted as 42–46574.
- 45-27948 – on display at the National Museum of the United States Air Force in Dayton, Ohio.
- Unknown – on display at the Menominee Range Historical Foundation in Iron Mountain, Michigan.
- Unknown – on display at the National Soaring Museum in Elmira, New York.
- Unknown – cockpit section on display at the Travis Air Force Base Heritage Center in Fairfield, California.
- Unknown – on display at the Don F. Pratt Memorial Museum at Fort Campbell near Clarksville, Tennessee.
- Unknown – on display at the Airborne & Special Operations Museum in Fayetteville, North Carolina.
- Unknown – on display during restoration at the U.S. Veterans Memorial Museum in Huntsville, Alabama.

In addition to the surviving aircraft, two replicas have been constructed and are on display in the United States. One is at the Fagen Fighters WWII Museum in Granite Falls, Minnesota. The other is at The Fighting Falcon Museum in Greenville, Michigan. A replica nose section made for the film Saving Private Ryan is on display at the South Yorkshire Aircraft Museum, Doncaster, United Kingdom.

== Specifications (CG-4A) ==
WACO CG-4A 3-view drawing

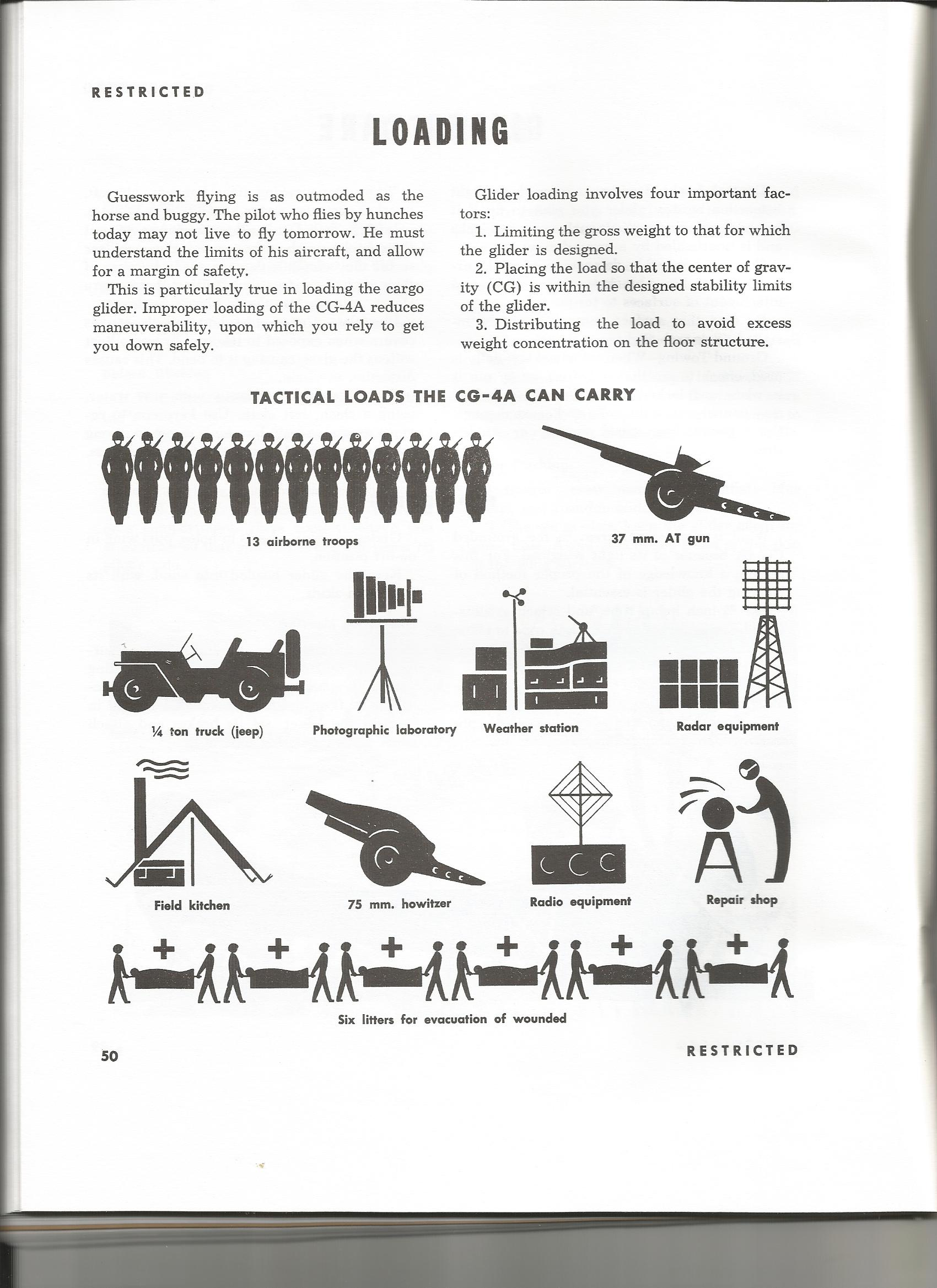
Page from manual specifying loads: as well as being able to carry up to 13 airborne troops or 6 litters of wounded men, the CG-4 could also carry such loads as a field kitchen, an anti-tank gun, a weather station, radar or radio equipment, a repair shop, a howitzer, a photographic laboratory, or a quarter-ton truck.

Data from Aviation Enthusiasts Corner. and Pilot's Flight Operating Instructions for Army Model CG4A Glider (TO No. 09-40CA-1)

General characteristics

- Crew: two pilots
- Capacity: 13 troops, or quarter-ton truck (Jeep) and 4 troopers, or 6 litters and 4,197 pounds (1,904 kg) useful load
- Length: 48 ft 8 in (14.8 m)
- Wingspan: 83 ft 8 in (25.5 m)
- Height: 15 ft 4 in (4.7 m)
- Wing area: 900 sq ft (83.6 m^{2})
- Empty weight: 3,900 lb (1,769 kg)
- Gross weight: 7,500 lb (3,402 kg)
- Max takeoff weight: 7,500 lb (3,402 kg)
- Max take off (Emergency Load): 9,000 pounds (4,100 kg)

Performance

- Maximum speed: 150 mph (240 km/h, 130 kn) CAS (Note: IAS about 158 mph (254 km/h)) at 7,500 pounds (3,400 kg)

128 mph (206 km/h) CAS/135 mph (217 km/h) IAS at 9,000 pounds (4,100 kg)

- Cruise speed: 73 mph (117 km/h, 63 kn) IAS (Note: IAS about 85 mph (137 km/h))
- Stall speed: 49 mph (79 km/h, 43 kn) (Note: about 60 mph (97 km/h) IAS) with design load 7,500 pounds (3,400 kg)
- Never exceed speed: 150 mph (241 km/h, 130 kn) IAS (Note: "...due to the possibility that windshield panels may blow in and other failures may occur.")
- Maximum glide ratio: 12:1
- Wing loading: 8.33 lb/sq ft (40.7 kg/m^{2})
- Rate of sink: About 400 ft/min (2 m/s) at tactical glide speed (IAS 60 mph; 97 km/h)
- Landing run: 600–800 feet (180–240 m) for normal three-point landing; "Landing rolls of approximately 2,000 to 3,000 feet (610 to 910 m) are to be expected at the higher emergency gross weights..."

== See also ==
Related development

- Waco CG-13 (CG-13A)
- Waco CG-15 (CG-15A)

Aircraft of comparable role, configuration, and era

- Airspeed Horsa
- DFS 230
- General Aircraft Hamilcar
- General Aircraft Hotspur
- Gotha Go 242
- Schweizer cargo glider designs
- Slingsby Hengist

Related lists

- List of aircraft of World War II
- List of World War II military gliders
