= Ram Nath Yadav =

Indian politician

Bihar Legislative Assembly
- In office 1980–1985; 1985–1990; 1990–1995 – 1995–2000
- Preceded by: Kailashpati Mishra
- Succeeded by: Ram Janam Sharma
- Constituency: Bikram

Personal details
- Born: Vill+Po-Ajavan, Patna, Bihar
- Party: Communist Party of India
- Occupation: Agriculturist
- Profession: Politician

Ram Nath Yadav is an Indian politician and a member of Bihar Legislative Assembly of India. He represents the Bikram constituency in Patna district of Bihar. He was elected since 1980, 1985, 1990 and 1995 as a member of Communist Party of India. Yadav contested 9th Lok Sabha from Patna in 1989 as a member of Communist Party of India but lost.
