= Siddharth Saurav =

Indian politician

Member Of Bihar Legislative Assembly
- Incumbent
- Assumed office 2015
- Preceded by: Anil
- Constituency: Bikram

Personal details
- Born: 1 January 1981 (age 45)
- Party: BJP
- Other political affiliations: INC, LJP

Siddharth Saurav is an Indian politician from Bihar. He is a three time member of the Bihar Legislative Assembly, from Bikram constituency in the Patna district representing the Indian National Congress. In early 2024, he joined BJP.

== Early life and education ==
Singh is from Bihta, Patna District, Bihar. He is the son of Dr. Utpal Kant Singh. He completed Class 12 in 1999 at Science College, Patna.

== Career ==
Singh won from Bikram Assembly constituency representing Indian National Congress in the 2020 Bihar Legislative Assembly election. He polled 86,177 votes and defeated his nearest rival and independent candidate, Anil Kumar Singh, by a margin of 35,460 votes. Earlier, he won as an MLA for the first time in the 2015 Bihar Legislative Assembly election from the same constituency.

Siddharth Saurav joined the Bharatiya Janata Party on 28 February 2024, ahead of the general elections.
