= Bikram Assembly constituency =

Assembly constituency in Bihar, India

Bikram
- Constituency No. 191 for the Bihar Legislative Assembly

Constituency details
- Country: India
- Region: East India
- State: Bihar
- District: Patna
- Established: 1957
- Total electors: 310,092
- Reservation: None

Member of Legislative Assembly
- 18th Bihar Legislative Assembly
- Incumbent Siddharth Saurav
- Party: BJP
- Alliance: NDA
- Elected year: 2025

Bikram is one of 243 representative districts of legislative assembly in the Indian state of Bihar. It is a part of Pataliputra Lok Sabha constituency along with other assembly constituencies viz. Danapur, Maner, Phulwari, Masaurhi and Paliganj.

== Area/wards ==
Bikram Assembly constituency comprises Naubatpur CD block and Bikram CD block; Gram Panchayats: Koudiya, Bindaul, Kunjwa, Machchhalpur Lai, Saidabad, Wazirpur, Naghar, Yamunapur and Taranagar of Bihta CD block.

== Members of the Legislative Assembly ==
| Year | Name | Party |
|---|---|---|
| 1957 | Manorma Devi | Indian National Congress |
| 1962 | Manorma Devi | Indian National Congress |
| 1967 | Mahabir Gop | Indian National Congress |
| 1969 | Khaderan Singh | Bharatiya Kranti Dal |
| 1972 | Khaderan Singh | Indian National Congress |
| 1977 | Kailashpati Mishra | Janata Party |
| 1980 | Ram Nath Yadav | Communist Party of India |
| 1985 | Ram Nath Yadav | Communist Party of India |
| 1990 | Ram Nath Yadav | Communist Party of India |
| 1995 | Ram Nath Yadav | Communist Party of India |
| 2000 | Ram Janam Sharma | Bharatiya Janata Party |
| 2005 | Anil Kumar | Lok Janshakti Party |
| 2005 | Anil Kumar | Bharatiya Janata Party |
| 2010 | Anil Kumar | Bharatiya Janata Party |
| 2015 | Siddharth Saurav | Indian National Congress |
| 2020 | Siddharth Saurav | Indian National Congress |
| 2025 | Siddharth Saurav | Bharatiya Janata Party |

== Election results ==
=== 2025 ===
Bihar Legislative Assembly Election, 2025: Bikram
| Party | Candidate | Votes | % | ±% |
|---|---|---|---|---|
| BJP | Siddharth Saurav | 101,189 | 47.02 | +39.03 |
| INC | Anil Kumar | 95,588 | 44.42 | −3.29 |
| Janshakti Janta Dal | Ajeet Kumar | 4,937 | 2.29 | |
| JSP | Mantu Kumar | 3,037 | 1.41 | |
| BSP | Ram Pravesh Yadav | 2,582 | 1.2 | −0.66 |
| NOTA | None of the above | 3,338 | 1.55 | +0.55 |
| Majority | | 5,601 | 2.6 | −17.03 |
| Turnout | | 215,202 | 69.4 | +10.83 |
| BJP gain from INC | | Swing | | |

=== 2020 ===
Bihar Legislative Assembly Election, 2020: Bikram
| Party | Candidate | Votes | % | ±% |
|---|---|---|---|---|
| INC | Siddharth Saurav | 86,177 | 47.71 | −6.73 |
| Independent | Anil Kumar | 50,717 | 28.08 | |
| BJP | Atul Kumar | 14,439 | 7.99 | −20.81 |
| Independent | Nagendra Kumar | 11,223 | 6.21 | |
| BSP | Arun Kumar | 3,363 | 1.86 | +0.72 |
| Independent | Dr. Mamtamayi Priyadarshini | 3,068 | 1.7 | |
| Independent | Surendra Yadav | 2,152 | 1.19 | |
| Jan Adhikar Party | Chandrashekhar Yadav | 2,027 | 1.12 | |
| NOTA | None of the above | 1,814 | 1.0 | −0.22 |
| Majority | | 35,460 | 19.63 | −6.01 |
| Turnout | | 180,640 | 58.57 | −0.51 |
| INC hold | | Swing | | |

=== 2015 ===
Bihar Legislative Assembly Election, 2015: Bikram
| Party | Candidate | Votes | % | ±% |
|---|---|---|---|---|
| INC | Siddharth Saurav | 94,088 | 54.44 | |
| BJP | Anil Kumar | 49,777 | 28.8 | |
| CPI(ML)L | Devendra Verma | 4,667 | 2.7 | |
| CPI | Raj Kumar Yadav | 3,497 | 2.02 | |
| Hindustan Vikas Dal | Shambhu Prasad Sharma | 2,496 | 1.44 | |
| Independent | Niraj Kumar | 2,495 | 1.44 | |
| Samras Samaj Party | Nagendra Kumar | 2,229 | 1.29 | |
| BSP | Munna Prasad | 1,976 | 1.14 | |
| SP | Jitendra Paswan | 1,933 | 1.12 | |
| Independent | Ramesh Kumar Sharma | 1,746 | 1.01 | |
| NOTA | None of the above | 2,114 | 1.22 | |
| Majority | | 44,311 | 25.64 | |
| Turnout | | 172,838 | 59.08 | |

=== 2010 ===
2010 Bihar Legislative Assembly election: Bikram
| Party | Candidate | Votes | % | ±% |
|---|---|---|---|---|
| BJP | Anil Kumar | 38,965 | 29.57 | |
| LJP | Siddharth Saurav | 36,613 | 27.78 | |
| Majority | | 2,352 | 1.79 | |
| Turnout | | | | |
| BJP gain from LJP | | Swing | | |

=== 2005 ===
2005 Bihar Legislative Assembly election: Bikram
| Party | Candidate | Votes | % | ±% |
|---|---|---|---|---|
| LJP | Anil Kumar | 46,150 | 42.0 | |
| RJD | Chandrama Singh Yadav | 35,859 | 32.6 | |
| BJP | Ram Janm Sharma | 12,725 | 11.6 | |
| Majority | | 10,291 | 9.4 | |
| Turnout | | 1,09,976 | 49.5 | |
| LJP gain from BJP | | Swing | | |
