= Gorakhri =

Village in Bihar, India

- Village
- Location within Bihar
- Coordinates: 25°27′49.72″N 84°52′30.68″E
- Country: India
- State: Bihar
- district: Patna
- block: Bikram

Population
  - Total: 6,347

Gorakhri village is located in Bikram block of Patna district in Bihar, India.

== Population ==
Gorakhri covers a total geographical area of 455 hectares and has a population of 6,347 people, with 3,298 males and 3,049 females.

There are approximately 1,000 houses in the village, and its postal code is 801104.

== Education ==
Gorakhri village literacy rate in Gorakhri village is 63.89%, with 73.68% of males and 53.30% of females being literate.

== Income sources ==
For most major economic activities, residents of Gorakhri typically rely on the nearest town, Bikram, which is approximately 4 km away.
