= Airborne Museum (Sainte-Mère-Église) =

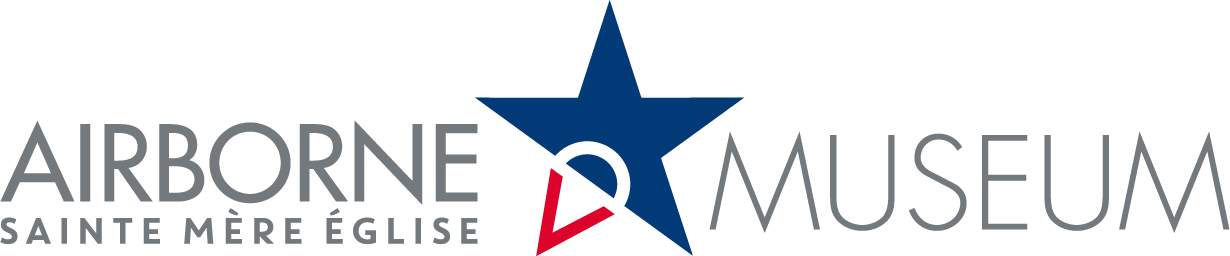
- Logo of the Airborne Museum.

- Location within France
- Established: 1964
- Location: 14 rue Eisenhower, Sainte-Mère-Église 50480
- Coordinates: 49.408249°N 1.314964°W
- Type: War museum
- Collections: Military exhibits dealing with the 82nd and 101st airborne divisions, US Army
- Visitors: 251 351 visitors in 2019
- Director: Magali Mallet
- President: Marc Lefèvre
- Website: http://www.airborne-museum.org

The Airborne Museum (Musée Airborne) is a French museum dedicated to the memory of paratroopers of the 82nd and 101st Airborne Divisions of the United States Army who parachuted into Normandy on the night of June 5–6, 1944. The museum is located in Sainte-Mère-Église.

== History ==
The museum was chartered under a 1901 law, and opened in 1964 with the help of donations from both residents and veterans. The Museum is located in Sainte-Mère-Église, in the La Manche region of Normandy, close to the beaches used for the Normandy landings. Sainte-Mère-Église became famous because of paratrooper John Steele whose parachute snagged on the belfry of the church on June 6, 1944, leaving him suspended in the air. The aim of the museum is to honor the American airborne forces troops of the 82nd and 101st Divisions.

== The museum ==
In 1964, to honor the liberators' memory, Dr Jean Masselin (the mayor of Sainte-Mère-Église), General Matthew Ridgway (Commanding General of the 82nd in 1944) and General James M. Gavin inaugurated the museum on the 20th anniversary of D-Day.

The WACO building, shaped like a large parachute shroud, contains an authentic Waco CG-4 glider, the only example in France. The glider is displayed with dummies representing soldiers getting ready for their flight. These gliders played a key role in transporting more than 4,000 troops as well as vehicles, ammunition and other military equipment, and rations for the soldiers. The museum also contains a wide variety of antique items from that era. This building is located on the same spot as the house which caught fire on the night of June 5, 1944, as shown in the movie The Longest Day.

Some ten years after the founding, Philippe Jutras, an American veteran and former Maine state legislator who had relocated from the United States to Sainte-Mère-Église, became fulltime volunteer curator of the museum. Over the next three decades, he expanded and transformed the little museum into one of the chief historical sites of Normandy. For his work and devotion, the French government made him a member of the Legion of Honor.

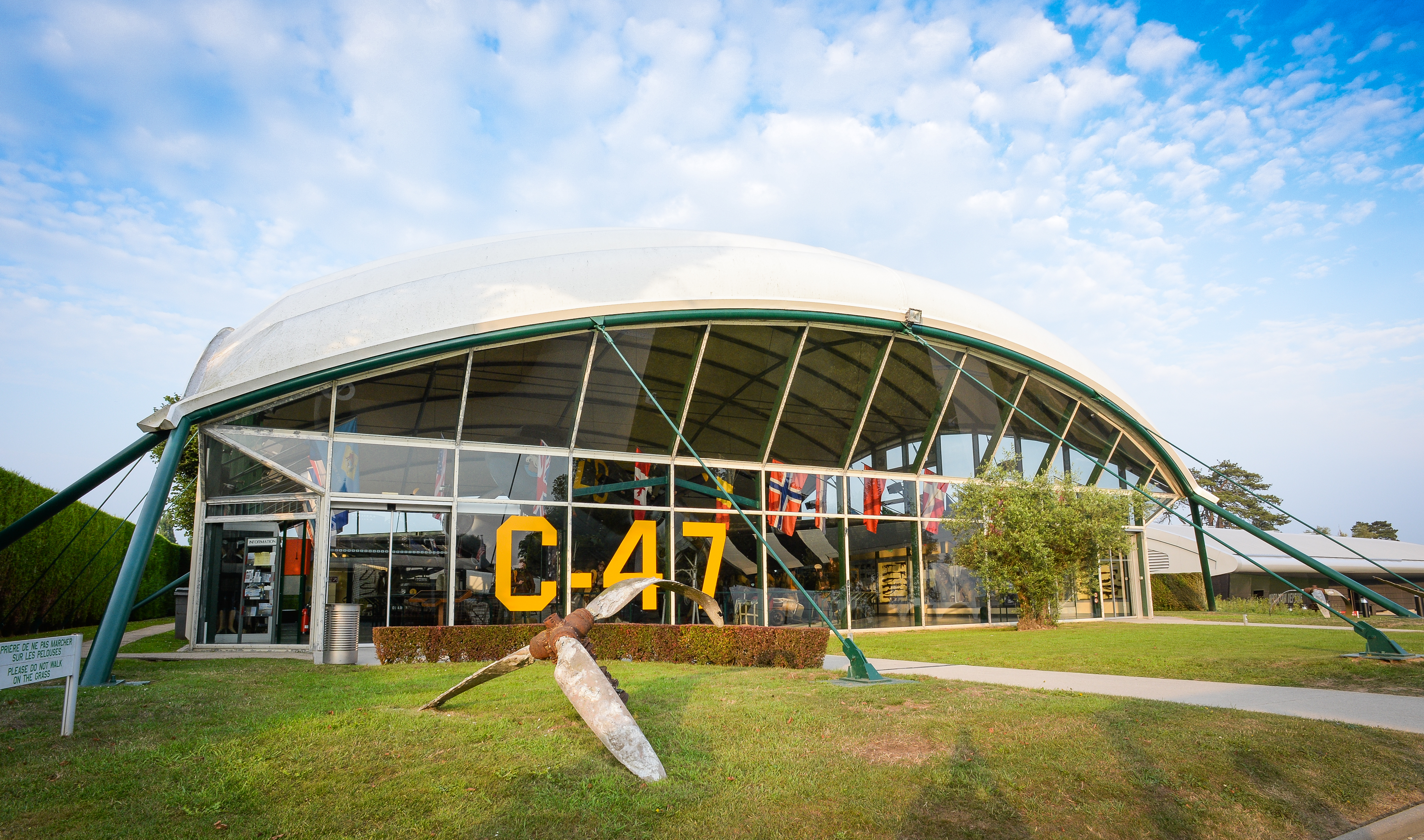
The second building in the museum complex opened in 1984.

In 1983, in the presence of Bob Murphy (who had served as a pathfinder in the 82nd Airborne Division), the inauguration of a second parachute-shaped building, which houses a Douglas C-47 Skytrain aircraft, took place. This aircraft was involved in airdrop operations on Sainte-Mère-Église on the night of June 5–6, 1944 and in the missions that followed. This building allows the public to "assist" in the preparations for the biggest military operation of the War in England, June 5, 1944, at the bottom of a real C-47. They can observe a diorama of the different recruits from the war with General Eisenhower before D-Day and the Battle of Normandy. The public can also view a film entitled Combat pour la Liberté (Fight for Freedom) that describes life during the German occupation and the liberation of Sainte-Mère-Église and the Cotentin Peninsula.

The second building in the museum complex opened in 1984.

For the 20th anniversary of the Airborne Museum, General James M. Gavin, who led the 82nd Airborne Division during World War II, attended the ceremonies.

For the 70th anniversary of D-Day, a third building named "Operation Neptune" opened its doors to the public. Operation Neptune was the first assault phase of Operation Overlord (the code name for the Battle of Normandy). The building was inaugurated in the presence of veterans of World War II. Covering an area of 1,200 square metres (13,000 sq ft), Operation Neptune is composed of rooms with realistic scenography that allows visitors to relive the D-Day experience. The visitor is first invited to board a C-47 Skytrain in England on June 5, 1944. Then the Battle of Sainte-Mère-Église unfolds including fighting in the marshes and for the bridges before the battle of the hedgerows. The tour ends in a hall with more evocative exhibits.

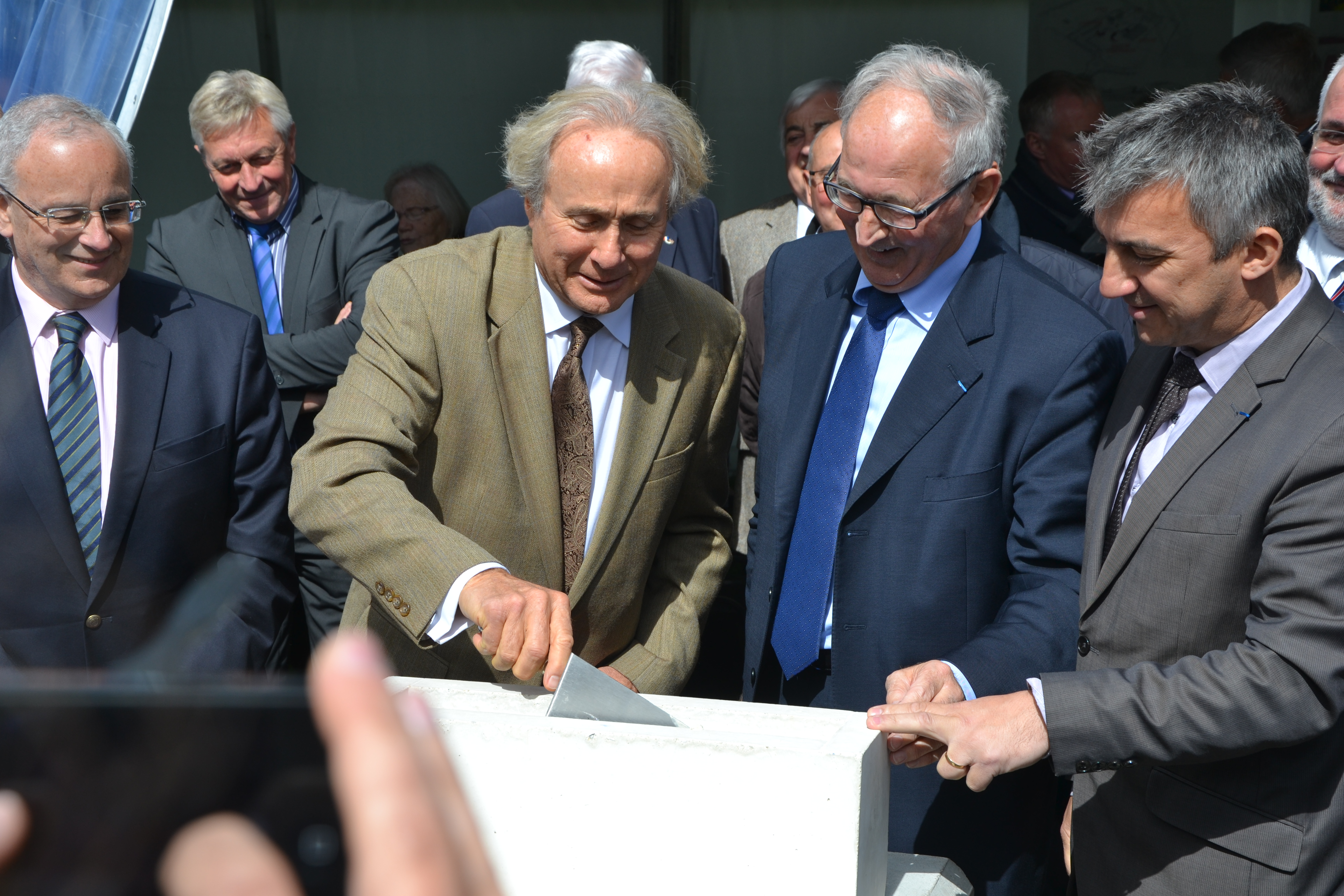
Michael Reagan (third from left, son of former US President Ronald Reagan), helped lay the first stone of a new conference center, May 19, 2015

In May 2015, work was begun on a fourth building, the Franco-American Ronald Reagan Conference Center, to be annexed to the Operation Neptune building and due to open the following year for use in holding temporary exhibitions, lectures, seminars and featuring a large cinema auditorium.

== Collections ==
The museum holds more than 10,000 items, including the CG-4 glider and the C-47 Skytrain, there is equipment used by generals James Gavin, Matthew Ridgway, J. Lawton Collins and John Steele's military decorations. The items on exhibit from World War II were used by paratroopers who jumped into Sainte-Mère-Église during the Battle of Normandy. The museum contains mostly American equipment, but there are some replicas of German military equipment from the period. There are at least a hundred uniformed dummies used to model uniforms and equipment of the period.

== Gallery ==
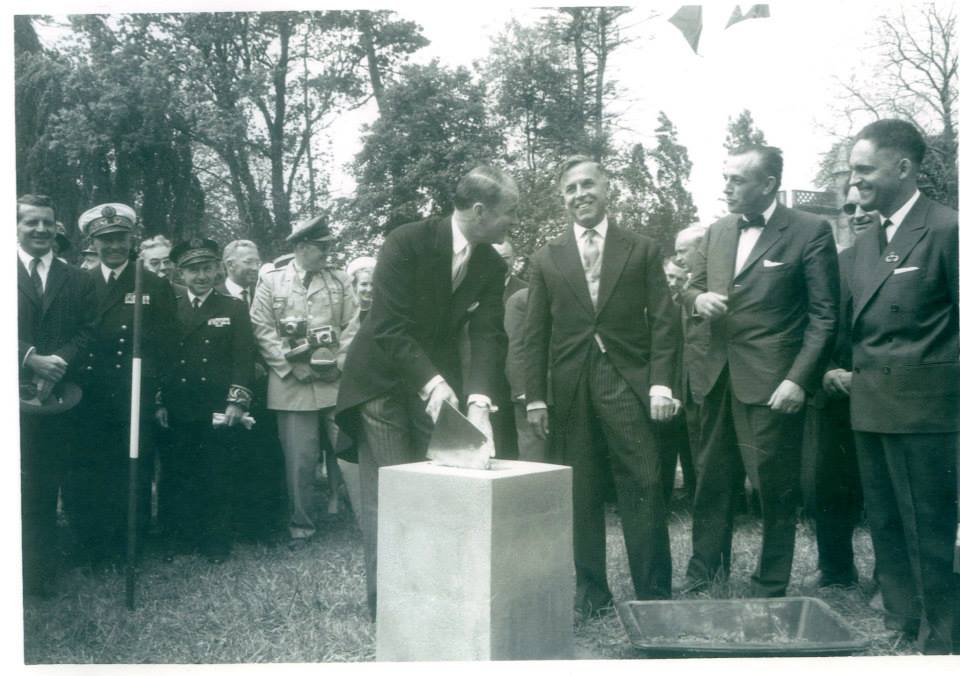
The cornerstone of the first building being placed by James M. Gavin, with Mayor Jean Masselin of Sainte-Mère-Église at far right, June 6, 1962

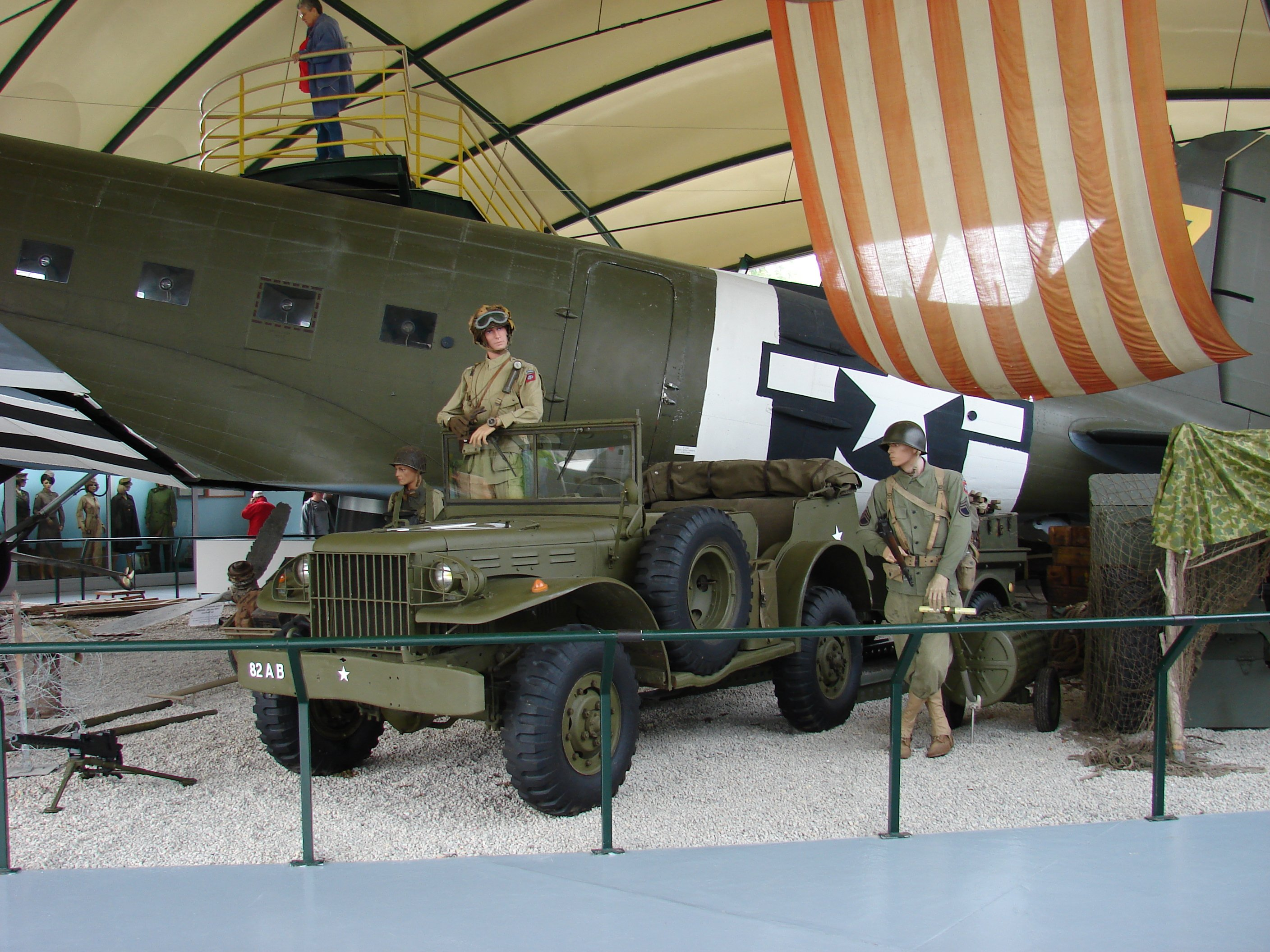
Interior exhibit showing dummies representing US soldiers, a Dodge WC series WC-56 command car and a Douglas C-47 Skytrain aircraft

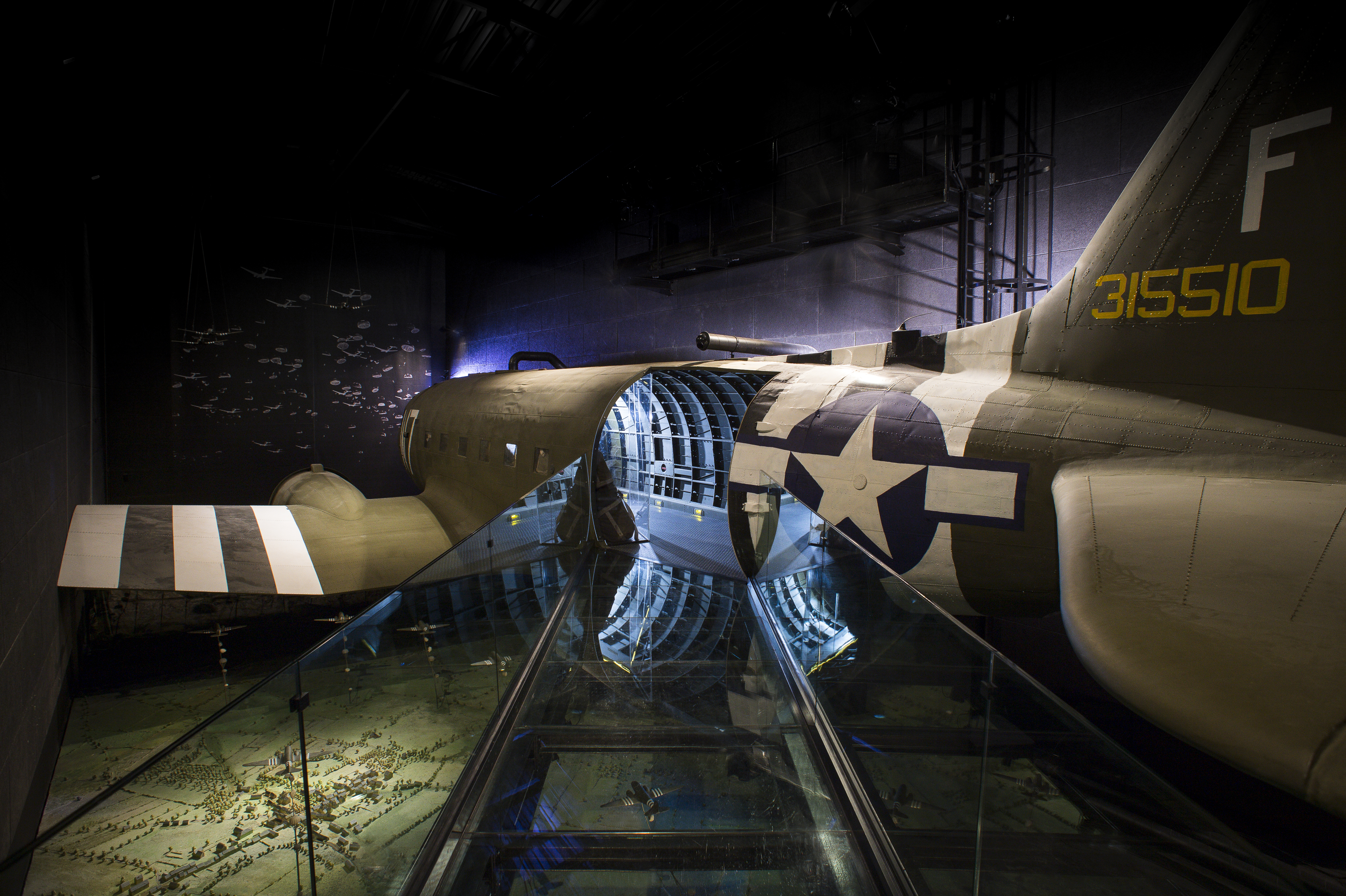
Entryway to a Douglas C-47 Skytrain
