= Bikram, Bihar =

Indian town in Patna district, Bihar

Bikram Sangrampur
- Patna
- Location in Bihar, India
- Coordinates: 25.450°N 84.867°E
- Country: India
- State: Bihar
- District: Patna

Languages
  - Official: Magadhi, Hindi
- Time zone: UTC+5:30 (IST)
- PIN: 801104
- ISO 3166 code: IN-BR
- Website: patna.nic.in paliganjtimes.com

Bikram is a town and block in Paliganj sub-division (tehsil) of Patna district in the Indian state of Bihar.

== Politics ==
Bikram assembly constituency is part of Pataliputra Lok Sabha constituency.

Bikram Assembly constituency covers Naubatpur and Bikram community development blocks, and Kaoria, Bindaul, Kunwa, Machchhalpur Lai, Yamunapur, and Taranagar gram panchayats of Bihta Community Development Block.

== List of villages ==
The list of villages in Bikram Block (under Paliganj Tehsil) is as follows: (GP is Gram Panchayat).

#	Village	Area (hectare)	Population (in 2011)
1	Akhtiarpur (GP)		3,346
2	Amwa		838
3	Anharipur		568
4	Arap (GP)		6,979
5	Baghakol		1,804
6	Baigawan		891
7	Baliari		2,486
8	Baliari		988
9	Bara		1,776
10	Barah (GP)		7,364
11	Barda		1,517
12	Bauwan		596
13	Beni Bigha (GP)		2,330
14	Berar		3,052
15	Beri		960
16	Bhadsara		1,424
17	Birdhaur		3,702
18	Chandni		345
19	Chandri		617
20	Chauthia		1,192
21	Chichourha		1,005
22	Chihunta		2,146
23	Danara Katari (GP)		3,200
24	Datiana (GP)		10,313
25	Donrapur		1,251
26	Dullahpur		836
27	Faridpur		1,130
28	Girwari Tola		433
29	Gona		3,500
30	Gopalpur		1,008
31	Gopalpur		1,636
32	Gorakhari (GP)		11,347
33	Gulami Chak		1,002
34	Habaspur Gona (GP)		2,893
35	Harpur		1,404
36	Hathsar		461
37	Jamalpur		1,983
38	Janpara		1,765
39	Kanpa		3,194
40	Katari		2,032
41	Karsa		550
42	Lahladpur		2,047
43	Mahajpura (GP)		3,039
44	Mahammadpur		2,033
45	Majhanpura		767
46	Majhauli		4,281
47	Maner Telpa (GP)		5,234
48	Math Baliari		398
49	Milki		961
50			2,835
51	Naghar (GP)		3,926
52	Nasirpur		1,059
53	Painapur		1,927
54	Pakrandha		2,040
55	Patut (GP)		9,111
56	Raghunathpur		3,026
57	Rahi		665
58	Saidabad		3,730
59	Sangrampur		1,800
60	Sarwan		930
61	Shahjahanpur		1,216
62	Shahpur		767
63	Shivgarh		1,819
64	Sikaria		601
65	Sundarpur		1,012
66	Tari		764
67	Wazirpur (GP)		6,929
