= List of Douglas A-20 Havoc operators =

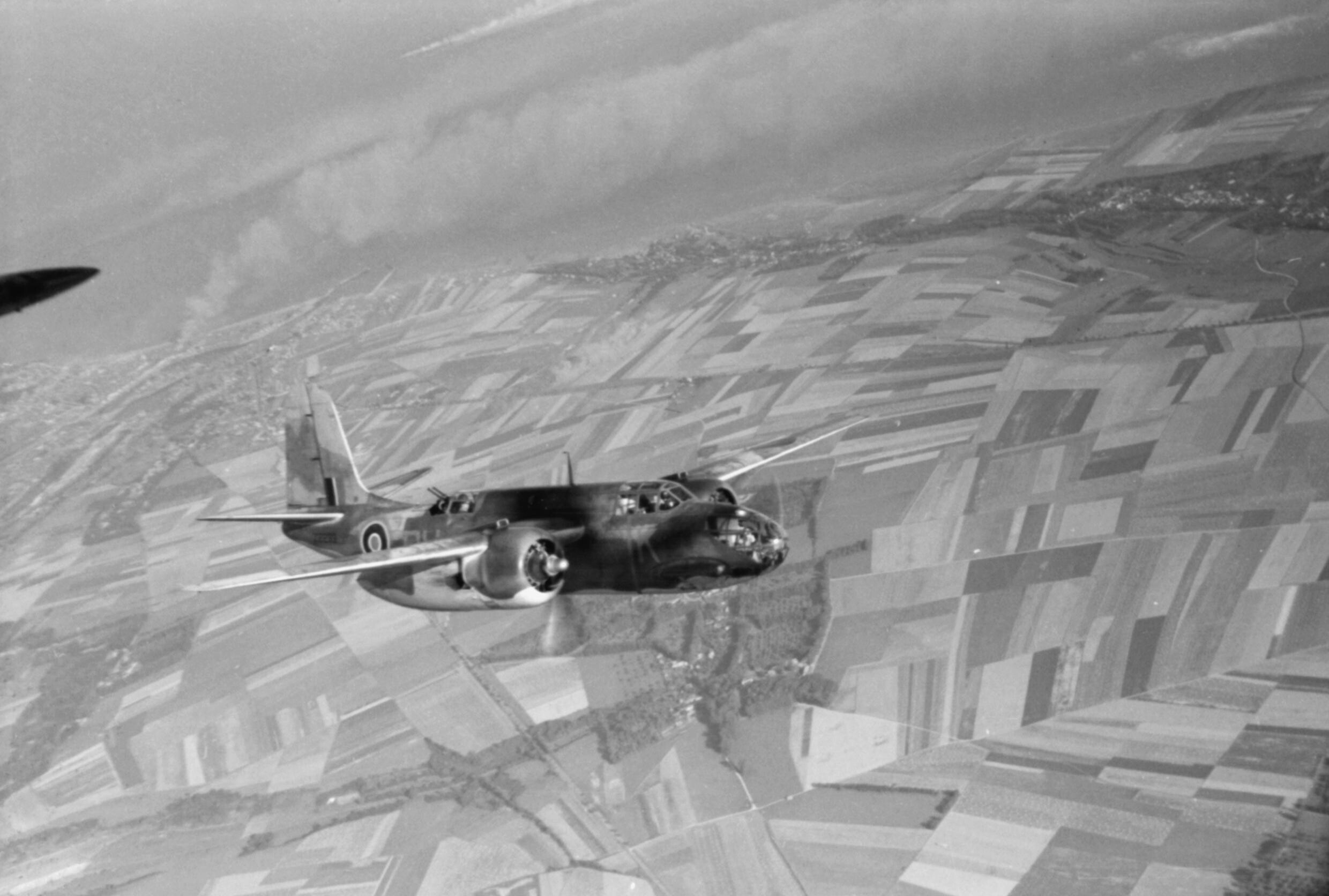
RAF Boston III from No. 88 Squadron RAF over Dieppe Harbour, 1942

List of A-20 Havoc operators identifies the country, military service, and unit that has been supplied or purchased A-20s.

== Operators ==
=== Australia ===
- Royal Australian Air Force operated 69 Aircraft, 22 DB-7B, 9 A-20C, 9 A-20A and 29 A-20G
  - No. 22 Squadron RAAF

=== Brazil ===
- Brazilian Air Force operated 30 A-20K and 1 A-20C
  - 1st Bomb Group Light
  - 2nd Bomb Group Light

=== Canada ===
- Royal Canadian Air Force
  - No. 418 Squadron RCAF

=== France ===
- French Air Force
  - No. 342 Sqn RAF (Free French)Boston III/IV

=== Japan ===
Japanese forces captured some Dutch DB-7B's in Java.

- Imperial Japanese Army Air Force
- Imperial Japanese Navy Air Service

=== Netherlands ===
- Royal Netherlands East Indies Army Air Force received only some of the DB-7Bs shipped in lieu of DC-7Cs actually ordered.

=== Poland ===
- Polish Air Force in Exile in Great Britain
  - No. 307 Polish Night Fighter Squadron

=== South Africa ===
- South African Air Force
- 24 Squadron SAAF

=== USSR ===
Received 2,908 Douglas Havocs, or over one third of total production.

- Soviet Air Force
- Soviet Naval Air Service
  - The Soviet Naval Air Service's primary anti-shipping aircraft were Havoc A-20Gs armed with torpedoes and mines.

=== United Kingdom ===
- Royal Air Force
  - No. 13 Squadron RAF
  - No. 14 Squadron RAF
  - No. 18 Squadron RAF
  - No. 23 Squadron RAF
  - No. 55 Squadron RAF
  - No. 85 Squadron RAF
  - No. 88 Squadron RAF
  - No. 93 Squadron RAF
  - No. 107 Squadron RAF
  - No. 114 Squadron RAF
  - No. 226 Squadron RAF
  - No. 530 Squadron RAF
  - No. 531 Squadron RAF
  - No. 532 Squadron RAF
  - No. 533 Squadron RAF
  - No. 534 Squadron RAF
  - No. 535 Squadron RAF
  - No. 536 Squadron RAF
  - No. 537 Squadron RAF
  - No. 538 Squadron RAF (formerly No. 1459 Flight RAF) - Havoc I Turbinlite night fighters, equipped with searchlight
  - No. 539 Squadron RAF
  - No. 605 Squadron RAF

=== United States ===
- United States Army Air Corps
- United States Army Air Forces
- United States Marine Corps
- United States Navy

== See also ==
- Douglas A-20 Survivors
