= RAF Hibaldstow =

Former Royal Air Force station in Lincolnshire, England

RAF Hibaldstow
- Hibaldstow, Lincolnshire in England
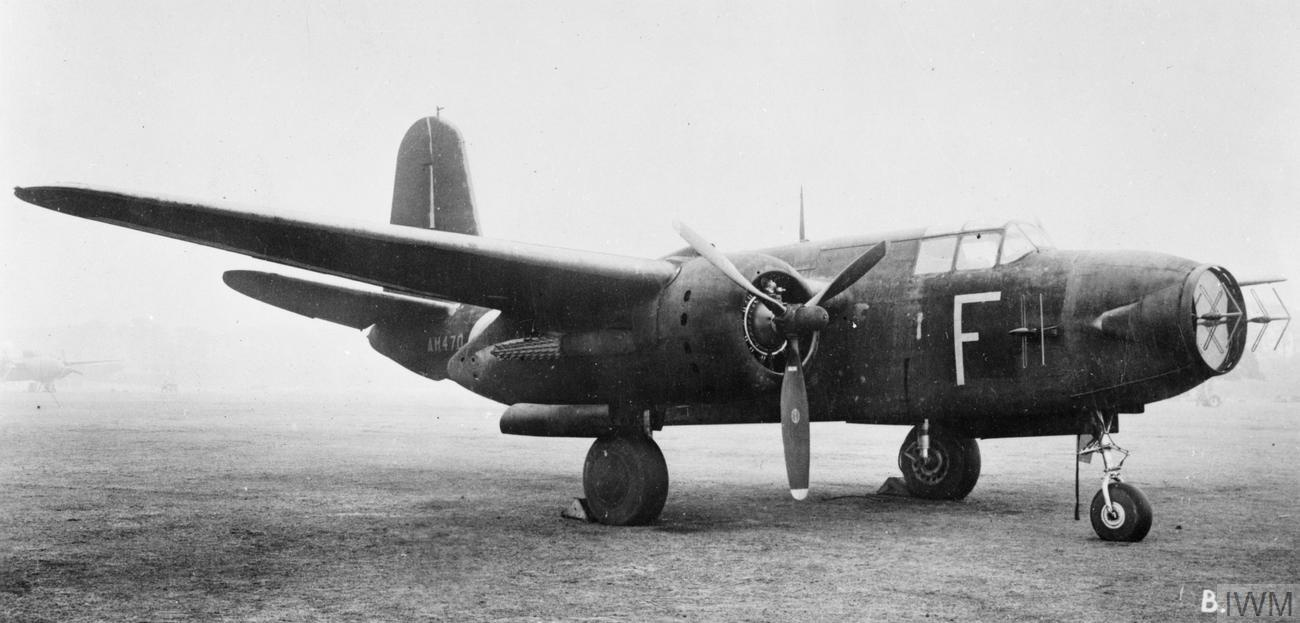
- A RAF Douglas Havoc Mk.II (Turbinlite), serial AH470 "F", of No. 1459 (Fighter) Flight based at Hibaldstow

Site information
- Type: Royal Air Force satellite station
- Code: HE
- Owner: Air Ministry
- Operator: Royal Air Force
- Controlled by: RAF Fighter Command * No. 9 Group RAF * No. 12 Group RAF * No. 81 (OTU) Group RAF

Location
- Shown within Lincolnshire RAF Hibaldstow (the United Kingdom)
- Coordinates: 53°29′50″N 000°31′22″W

Site history
- Built: 1940/41
- In use: May 1941 - May 1945
- Battles/wars: European theatre of World War II

Airfield information
- Elevation: 10 metres (33 ft) AMSL
Runways
Direction	Length and surface
00/00	Tarmac
00/00	Tarmac
00/00	Tarmac

Royal Air Force Hibaldstow or more simply RAF Hibaldstow is a former Royal Air Force satellite station located south of Hibaldstow in Lincolnshire and 8.3 miles (13.4 km) south east of Scunthorpe, Lincolnshire, England.

The airfield was built with greater things in mind, but it only became a satellite airfield for RAF Kirton-in-Lindsey in 1941. When the runways were constructed, some of the hardcore was made from material taken from demolished bungalows on the site.

== History ==
The airfield was commissioned on 12 May 1941 when No. 255 Squadron RAF took up residence with their Boulton Paul Defiant night fighters. These planes had been drawn from RAF Kirton-in-Lindsey and made one 'kill': an Heinkel He 111 which was shot down near Louth on 5 June 1941.

In June 1941 the Defiants were replaced by Bristol Beaufighter IIFs and on 23 September 1941 No. 253 (Hyderabad) Squadron from RAF Skeabrae, Orkney, arrived. In addition Douglas Havocs from RAF Hunsdon in Hertfordshire also came to the base.

By the start of 1943, the high risk of night attacks by the Luftwaffe led to the closure of the airfield on 23 January 1943. It re-opened on 9 May 1943 for No. 53 Operational Training Unit RAF (OTU) and once again closed on 15 May 1945. Shortly before closure WAAF Margaret Horton had an 'unexpected ride on the tail of a Supermarine Spitfire' while acting as a tailweight: she was sitting on the tail of the plane, as was common practice, in order to stop it overturning while it taxied to the end of the runway, a hazard stemming from design drawbacks, strong wind and bouncy grass field. The pilot, anxious to be airborne, forgot about her and failed to stop to allow the WAAF to jump off the tail. As soon as the plane was in the air, the pilot realised that there was something very wrong with the handling of his aircraft. He radioed the control tower to report the problem. The emergency services were called out and the pilot talked back in without being told what had happened. The aircraft landed safely with Margaret Horton still in one piece.

On 6 August 1947 the station finally closed and during 1960-61 it was sold off for use as agricultural land. It was also used for Sunday markets, as a skid-pan by Lincolnshire Police and by a local parachute club. The control tower was converted to a two-storey house in 1976.

The following squadrons were here at some point:

- No. 93 Squadron RAF
- No. 409 Squadron RCAF
- No. 486 Squadron RNZAF
- No. 532 Squadron RAF
- No. 538 Squadron RAF

Units

- No. 5 (Pilots) Advanced Flying Unit RAF
- No. 1453 (Fighter) Flight RAF
- No. 1459 (Fighter) Flight RAF
- No. 2718 Squadron RAF Regiment
- No. 2734 Squadron RAF Regiment
- No. 2773 Squadron RAF Regiment
- No. 2774 Squadron RAF Regiment
- No. 2800 Squadron RAF Regiment
- No. 2891 Squadron RAF Regiment

== Hibaldstow Airfield ==
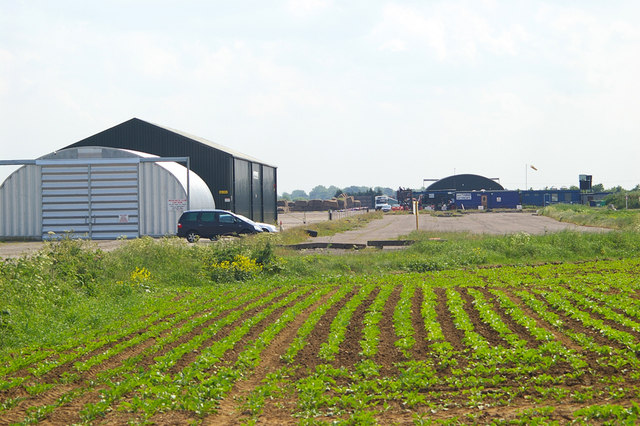
Buildings housing Target Skysports

The airfield was taken over in 1992 as a parachute centre and has run skydiving courses there continuously since this period. As one of the biggest civilian dropzones, they have become a regular host to the British National Championships.

Army cadet Stephen Hilder fell 4,000 metres (13,000 ft) to his death at Hibaldstow airfield in July 2003, after the risers on parachutes had been cut. Although murder was initially suspected, an inquest returned an open verdict.

== See also ==
- List of former Royal Air Force stations
- Skydive Hibaldstow
