= Middle Wallop Flying Station =

Military airfield in Hampshire, England

Middle Wallop Flying Station
- Middle Wallop, Stockbridge, Hampshire
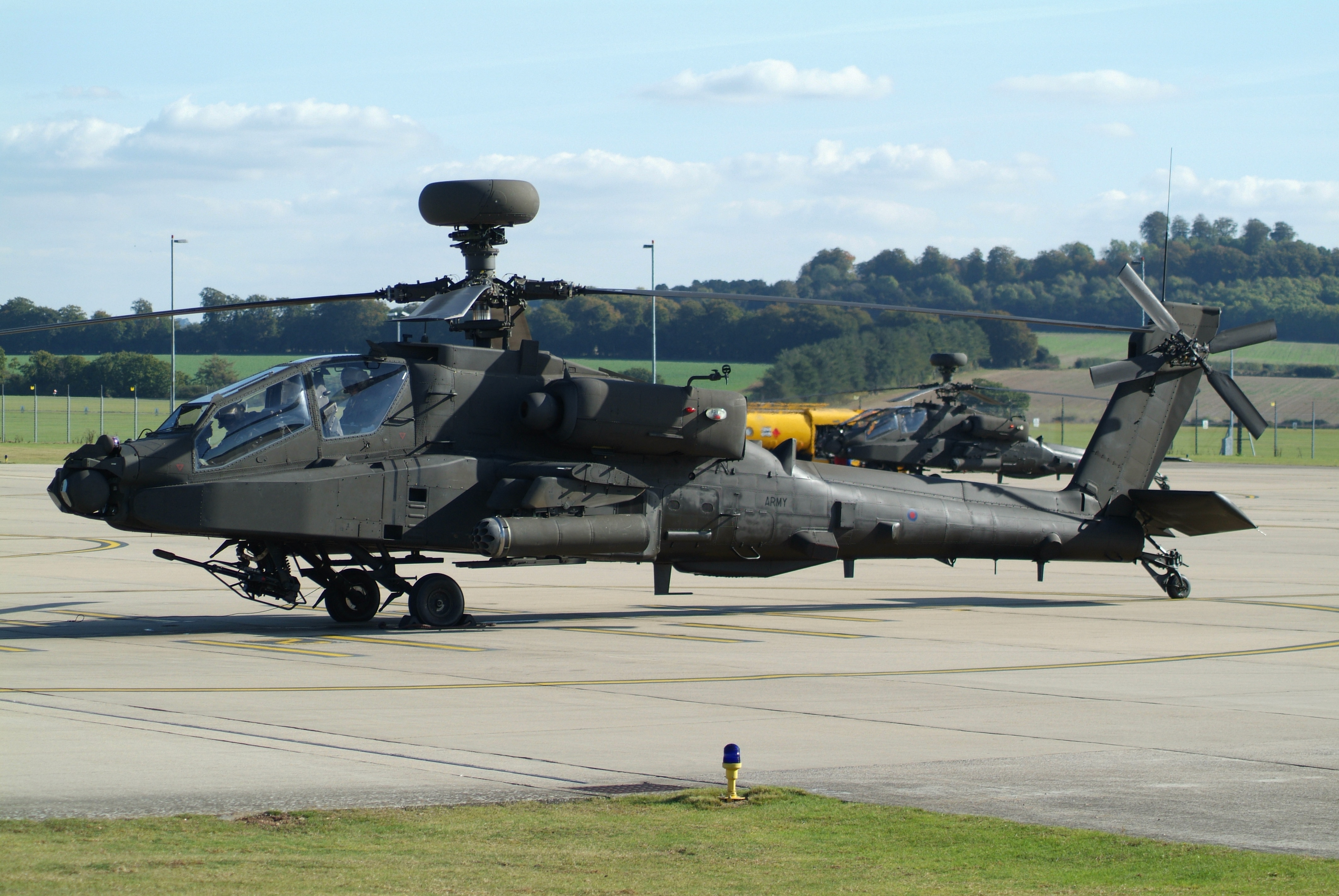
- An Army Air Corps AgustaWestland Apache AH1 at Middle Wallop.

- Prepare

Site information
- Type: Army Air Corps airfield
- Code: MW
- Owner: Ministry of Defence
- Operator: British Army
- Controlled by: Army Air Corps

Location
- Location within Hampshire
- Coordinates: 51°08′56″N 001°34′12″W

Site history
- Built: 1939/40
- In use: Royal Air Force (April 1940–1945 and 1946–1958); Fleet Air Arm (1945–1946); Army Air Corps (1957 – present)
- Battles/wars: European theatre of World War II; Cold War

Airfield information
- Identifiers: ICAO: EGVP
- Elevation: 90.5 metres (297 ft) AMSL
Runways
Direction	Length and surface
08/26	1,096 metres (3,596 ft) Grass
17/35	1,181 metres (3,875 ft) Grass
- Source: Middle Wallop Defence Aerodrome Manual

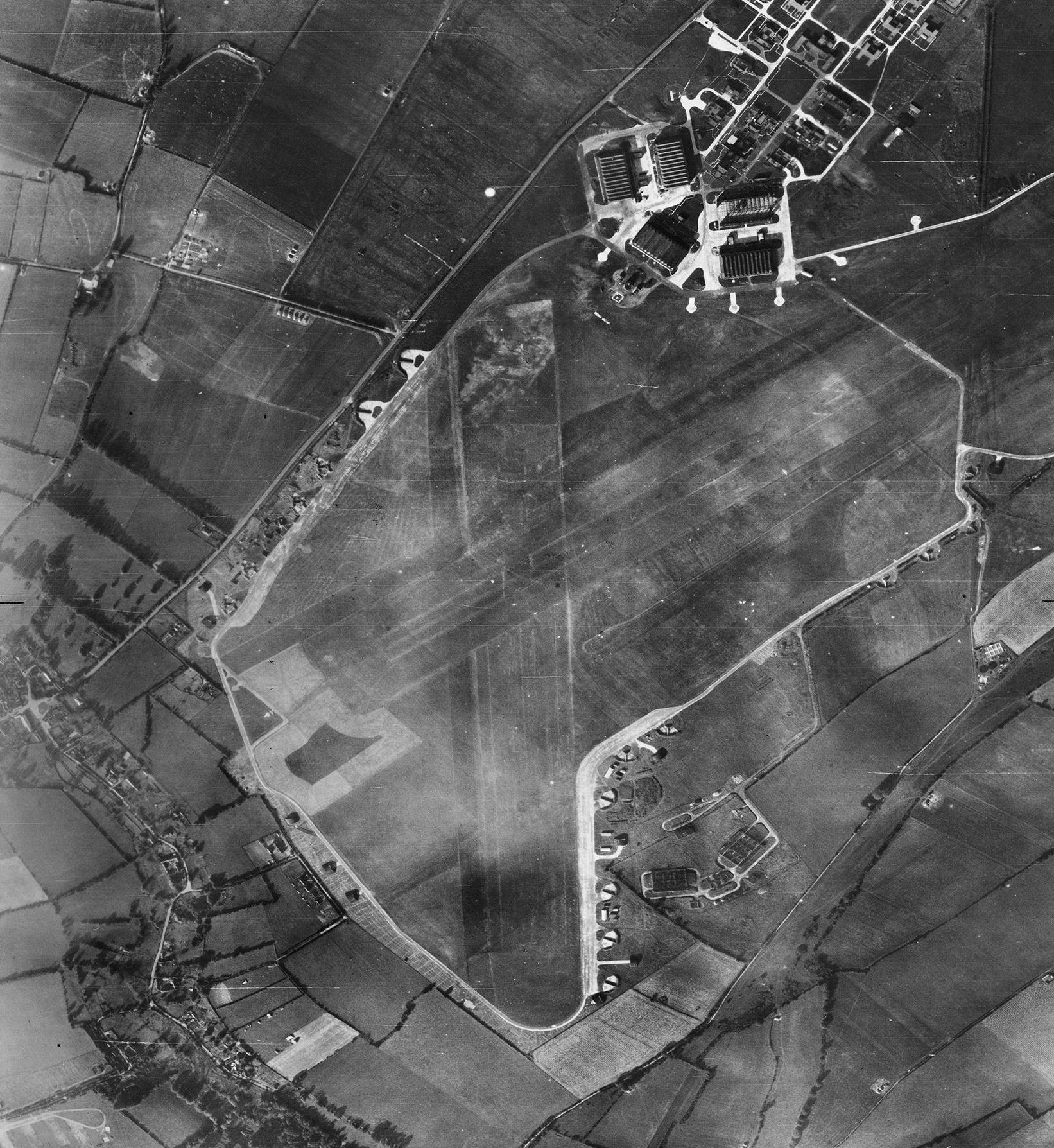
Aerial photograph of RAF Middle Wallop looking north, the control tower is in front of the technical site with five C-Type hangars upper right, 29 October 1946

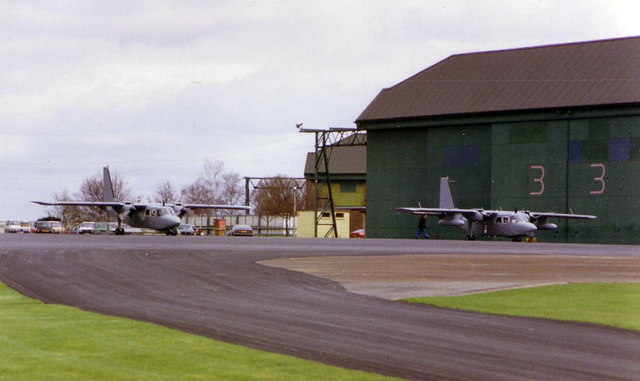
Two AAC Britten-Norman Turbine Defender aircraft outside the hangars at Middle Wallop

Middle Wallop Flying Station is a British Army airfield located near the Hampshire village of Middle Wallop. It is the Headquarters for the Army Air Corps, and the 1st Aviation Brigade Combat Team, and is also used for Army Air Corps training. The base hosts 2 (Training) Regiment AAC and 7 (Training) Regiment AAC under the umbrella of the Army Aviation Centre. 2 Regiment performs ground training; 7 Regiment trains aircrew on AAC aircraft after they complete basic training at RAF Shawbury.

The base is notable for having previously served as both a Royal Navy (as HMS Flycatcher) and a Royal Air Force (as RAF Middle Wallop) controlled airfield, as well as an Army one initially as Middle Wallop Airfield.

== History ==
=== Early use ===
The base was opened as RAF Middle Wallop, a training school for new pilots in 1940. It was originally intended for bomber use; however, with the Battle of Britain being fought, No. 609 Squadron RAF, flying the Supermarine Spitfire Ia, and No. 238 Squadron RAF flying the Hawker Hurricane I were moved to Middle Wallop.

Among the fighter pilots who flew from here in the Battle of Britain were former journalist John Dundas (a veteran of the Battle of France, and brother of another notable RAF pilot, "Cocky" Dundas), and three remarkable Americans, "Red" Tobin, Andy Mamedoff, and "Shorty" Keough. Keough, who was less than five feet tall, was reputed to be the shortest pilot serving in the RAF.

In September 1940 604 Squadron RAF, a specialist night fighter unit, received the Bristol Beaufighter, equipped with four 20-mm cannon under the nose and improved Mark IV AI radio-location equipment. As one of the few Squadrons thus equipped, 604 squadron helped provide night time defence over the UK during the Blitz from late 1940 until mid-May 1941. In this time 50 air victories had been claimed by No. 604 Squadron, 14 by F/L John Cunningham.

RAF Chilbolton was designated the relief landing airfield for Middle Wallop, until it became a fully fledged Fighter Station in its own right, as the Battle of Britain progressed.

In a post-war memoir, an RAF night-fighter pilot who began flying Beaufighters from Middle Wallop with 604 Sqdn in January 1942 recalls the grass airfield as presenting challenges for the pilots of the big fighters. He describes Middle Wallop as having:

. . . two runways of 1,400 and 800yd, which undulated so that their bumps would catch the unwary coming in to land. Ten tons of Beaufighter thus required a fair degree of accuracy in the approach speed. If you had 10-15mph too much on the clock as you came over the hedge, the aeroplane would then float for a hundred yards or so before touching down at 80mph, and thus use up the spare margin of distance available for stopping. Weak brakes then meant a trip through the far hedge, or an exciting ground loop. So we all quickly learned the value of precision flying and brought our aircraft in to land within 1 percent of 105mph on the approach and 90mph over the hedge.

Squadrons serving at Middle Wallop included:

- No. 16 Squadron RAF initially between April 1942 and January 1943 with the Mustang I, returning 1 June 1943 as a full squadron with the Spitfire V until 29 June 1943. The squadron returned on 6 October 1947 with the Tempest F.2, staying until 17 October 1947.
- No. 19 Squadron RAF from 1 March 1943 and 5 April 1943 with the Spitfire VC; with a brief 3 day move to Membury during this period.
- No. 23 Squadron RAF as a detachment between March 1941 and February 1942 with the Havoc I
- No. 32 Squadron RAF between 15 December 1940 and 16 February 1941 with the Hurricane I
- No. 56 Squadron RAF between 29 November 1940 and 17 December 1940 with the Hurricane I
- No. 93 Squadron RAF reformed here on 7 December 1940 from No. 420 Flight with a variety of aircraft including Harrow II (LAM), Havoc I, Wellington IC, Boston I and Havoc I (Turbinlite)
- No. 151 Squadron RAF between 16 August and 17 November 1943 with a detachment at Coltishall flying Mosquito VI & XII
- No. 164 (Argentine–British) Squadron RAF between 8 February and 20 June 1943 with the Hurricane IID & IV
- No. 169 Squadron RAF from 21 June 1943 until 30 September 1943 when the squadron was disbanded flying the Mustang I
- No. 182 Squadron RAF between 1 March and 5 April 1943 with the Typhoon IB
- No. 234 (Madras Presidency) Squadron RAF between 14 August and 11 September 1940 with the Spitfire I
- No. 236 Squadron RAF between 14 June and 4 July 1940 with the Blenheim IF
- No. 238 Squadron RAF multiple times between 20 June 1940 and 1 February 1941 with the Hurricane I
- No. 245 (Northern Rhodesian) Squadron RAF between 19 December 1941 and 26 October 1942 with a detachment at Shoreham flying the Hurricane IIB & IIC
- No. 247 (China-British) Squadron RAF initially as a detachment between 17 May and 21 September 1942 with the Hurricane I & IIB. The full squadron returned on 28 February 1943 flying the Hurricane IIB and Typhoon IB, staying until 5 April 1943 when the squadron moved to Fairlop
- No. 256 Squadron RAF as a detachment between 6 February and 26 March 1941 with the Defiant I
- No. 286 Squadron RAF as a detachment sometime between April 1942 and 1944 with the Master III, Defiant I & III, Hurricane I & IIX and Oxford
- No. 400 Squadron RCAF between 4 December 1942 and 1 February 1943 with the Mustang I
- No. 406 Squadron RCAF between 8 December 1942 and 31 March 1943 with the Beaufighter VIF
- No. 414 Squadron RCAF between 1 February and 26 May 1943 with the Mustang I
- No. 456 Squadron RAAF between 29 March and 17 August 1943 with the Mosquito II & VI
- No. 501 (County of Gloucester) Squadron AAF initially between 4 July and 25 July 1940 with the Hurricane I. The squadron returned on 24 August 1942 with Spitfire VB & VC, before leaving on 19 October 1942 going to Ballyhalbert
- No. 504 (County of Nottingham) Squadron AAF between 19 October and 30 December 1942 with the Spitfire VB & VC
- No. 537 Squadron RAF formed here on 8 September 1942 from No. 1458 Flight using a variety of aircraft including Havoc I (Turbinlite), Boston III (Turbinlite), Hurricane IIB & IIC and the Havoc I. Before disbanding on 25 January 1943
- No. 601 (County of London) Squadron AAF between 1 June and 17 June 1940 with the Hurricane I
- No. 604 (County of Middlesex) Squadron AAF between 27 July 1940 and 18 February 1943 with the Blenheim I and Beaufighter IF
- No. 609 (West Riding) Squadron AAF between 6 July and 2 October 1940 with Spitfire I

=== USAAF use ===
Middle Wallop was also used by the United States Army Air Forces Ninth Air Force to house Headquarters IX Fighter Command, beginning in November 1943. A month after the headquarters arrived, the 67th Reconnaissance Group was moved from RAF Membury. The move of the 67th Group was made in December 1943 so it would be in close proximity to IX FC Headquarters. The 67th Group flew the photographic versions of the Lockheed P-38 Lightning (F-5) and North American P-51 Mustang (F-6) to fly artillery-adjustment, weather-reconnaissance, bomb-damage assessment, photographic-reconnaissance, and visual-reconnaissance missions to obtain photographs that aided the invasion of the Continent.

After D-Day, both the 67th RG moved to its Advanced Landing Ground at Le Molay-Littry (ALG A-9) and IX FC Headquarters moved to Les Obeaux, France in late June 1944 ending the USAAF presence at Middle Wallop. During the American use, the airfield was designated as USAAF Station 449, ID Code: MW.

=== RAF / RNAS use ===
Middle Wallop returned to Royal Air Force use from July 1944 for No. 418 Squadron RCAF and its de Havilland Mosquito night-fighters.

In January 1945, in an exchange with the Royal Air Force, Middle Wallop was transferred to Royal Navy use, and became 'RNAS Middle Wallop'. HMS Flycatcher, the headquarters for the Mobile Naval Air Base organisation then moved in from RNAS Ludham, Norfolk, which reverted to RAF use.

In 1946, the Royal Air Force occupied Middle Wallop again. No. 164 Squadron RAF with its Spitfires came and were renumbered to No. 63 Squadron RAF. The following year, No. 227 OCU, an Army air observation post training unit, was moved to the airfield. This was renamed as the Air Observation Post School in 1950, and the Light Aircraft School in 1952.

- No. 63 Squadron RAF reformed here on 1 September 1946 with the Spitfire LF 16E, staying for 3 days before moving to Lubeck;
- No. 80 Squadron RAF from 5 May 1947 with the Tempest V, staying until 16 May 1947;
- No. 125 (Newfoundland) Squadron RAF between 31 July and 18 October 1944 with a detachment at Bradwell Bay flying Mosquito XVII;
- No. 165 (Ceylon) Squadron RAF between 3 July and 8 July 1946 with the Spitfire IXE;
- No. 285 Squadron RAF as a detachment between 19 November 1944 and 4 January 1945 with the Oxford and Hurricane IIC;
- No. 288 Squadron RAF reformed here on 16 March 1953 operating Spitfire LF 16E and Boulton Paul Balliol T.2 until 30 September 1957 when the squadron was disbanded;
- No. 418 Squadron RCAF between 29 July and 28 August 1944 with the Mosquito II;
- No. 587 Squadron RAF as a detachment between 1 October 1944 and 1 June 1946 flying a variety of aircraft including Hurricane IIC & IV, Martinet, Vengeance IV, Mustang I and Spitfire XVI;
- No. 651 Squadron RAF reformed here on 1 November 1955 with the Sycamore HC II & Auster AOP 6 until the squadron was transferred to the AAC;
- No. 657 Squadron RAF from 19 January 1948 with the Auster V, AOP 4, AOP 6, Hoverfly II and Sycamore HC II until the squadron was disbanded on 1 November 1955 to become 651 Squadron RAF;
- No. 1963 Reserve Air Observation Post Flight RAF of No. 662 Squadron RAF formed here on 1 September 1949, and used the Auster AOP 5, AOP 6 and AOP 4 until 10 March 1957, when the squadron was disbanded.

=== Units ===
The following units were also here at some point:

- No. 1 Aircraft Delivery Flight RAF
- No. 6 Fighter Command Servicing Unit RAF
- No. 15 Service Flying Training School RAF
- No. 41 Operational Training Unit RAF
- No. 62 Group Communication Flight RAF
- No. 62 (Southern Reserve) Group RAF
- 67th Tactical Reconnaissance Group
- No. 121 Airfield Headquarters RAF
- No. 371 Repair & Salvage Unit
- No. 420 Flight RAF
- No. 1458 (Fighter) Flight RAF
- No. 1900 Independent Air Observation Post Flight RAF
- No. 1901 Air Observation Post Flight RAF
- No. 1906 (Helicopter) Flight RAF
- No. 1962 Reserve Air Observation Post Flight RAF
- No. 2749 Squadron RAF Regiment
- No. 2750 Squadron RAF Regiment
- No. 2770 Squadron RAF Regiment
- No. 2775 Squadron RAF Regiment
- No. 2811 Squadron RAF Regiment
- No. 2813 Squadron RAF Regiment
- No. 2848 Squadron RAF Regiment
- No. 2879 Squadron RAF Regiment
- No. 3501 Servicing Unit
- No. 4079 Anti-Aircraft Flight RAF Regiment
- Central Flying School Helicopter Development Flight
- Fighter Command Control and Reporting School RAF
- Fighter Experimental Establishment RAF
- Southern Sector HQ RAF
- School of Fighter Plotting RAF

=== Army Air Corps use ===
In 1954 a Development Flight (CFS) with helicopters was formed there, this led to the Joint Experimental Helicopter Unit in 1955. On 1 September 1957, when British Army aviation became independent of the RAF, RAF technicians remained until Royal Electrical and Mechanical Engineers (REME) technicians were fully trained to take over, On 1 October 1958 the airfield was handed over from RAF Home Command to the Army Air Corps.

Middle Wallop was transferred to the new Army Air Corps with the former Light Aircraft School RAF becoming the Army Air Corps Centre. The centre was made up of the:

- Depot Regiment
- Demonstration and Trials Squadron
- Training Cell
- 78th Army Education Centre
- Standards department

The centre was also made up of the Pilot Training Wing (renamed Flying Wing in 1965), Tactics Wing, Technical Wing (disbanded 1965), Aircraft Servicing Branch and Administrative Wing.

The Army Air Corps Centre was previously the Light Aircraft School RAF (1953–57), Air Observation Post School RAF (1950–53), No. 227 (Air Observation Post) Conversion Unit (1947–50), No. 227 Operational Conversion Unit RAF (1947), No. 43 Operational Training Unit (1942–47), No. 1424 (Air Observation Post) Flight RAF (1941–42) and D Flight RAF within the No. 1 School of Army Co-operation RAF (1940–41).

The School of Army Aviation was established in 1965 by renaming and separating the Training Cell which included the ground instructional part of the Tactics Wing, Aircraft Engineering Training Wing (Note: Beaver says it was called the Aircraft Engineering Wing) and the Flying Wing. The school was disbanded during March 1973. It changed its name to the Army Aviation Centre on 1 August 2009.

== Operational units ==
Flying and notable non-flying units based at Middle Wallop Airfield.

=== British Army ===
Army Air Corps
Headquarters, Army Air Corps
Headquarters, 1st Aviation Brigade
5 Regiment
Headquarters, 6 Regiment (Reserves)
Joint Aviation Command

- Army Aviation Centre
  - 2 (Training) Regiment Army Air Corps
    - 668 (Training) Squadron
    - 671 (Headquarters) Squadron
    - 676 Squadron
  - 7 (Training) Regiment Army Air Corps
    - 653 Squadron
    - 673 Squadron – AH64E Apache
- Army Flying Grading Flight – Tutor T1

The base is also the home of the Historic Army Aircraft Flight a charitable trust that flies historic Army aircraft for public display and the Army Flying Museum.

== See also ==
- List of airfields of the Army Air Corps (United Kingdom)
- Army aviation school
