= Kenneth Blair (RAF officer) =

British flying ace of WWII

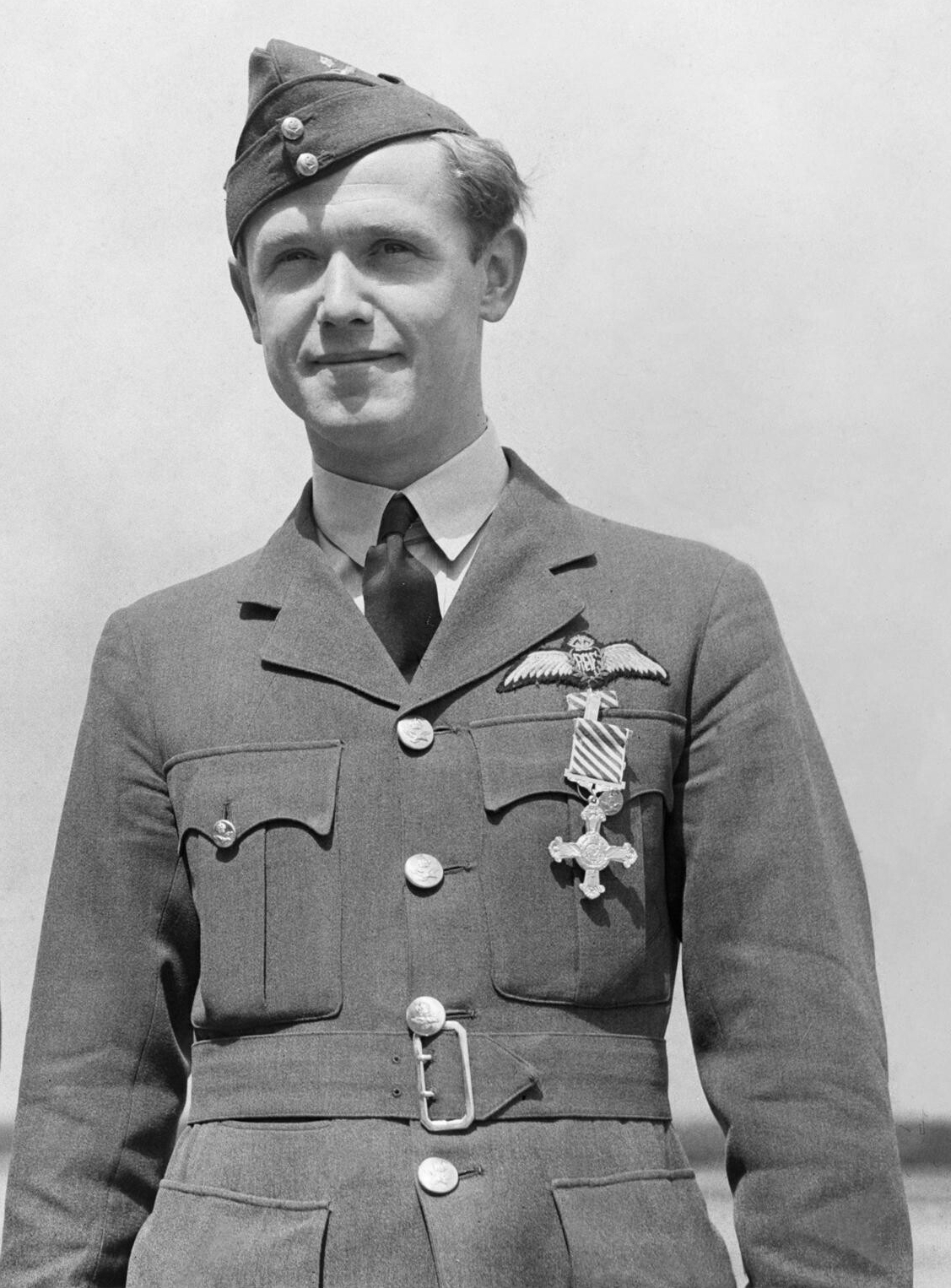
- Blair after being presented with his Distinguished Flying Cross, 27 June 1940
- Born: 15 February 1918; Stockport, England
- Died: 31 October 1953 (aged 35); Lindholm, England
- Burial place: Hatfield Cemetery, Doncaster
- Military career
- Allegiance: United Kingdom
- Branch: Royal Air Force
- Service years: 1937–1953
- Rank: Wing Commander
- Commands: No. 1453 Flight; No. 613 Squadron
- Conflicts: Second World War: Battle of France; Battle of Britain; The Blitz
- Awards: Distinguished Flying Cross and Bar; Mention in Despatches (2)

Kenneth Blair, DFC & Bar (15 February 1918 – 31 October 1953) was a British flying ace of the Royal Air Force (RAF) during the Second World War. He is credited with the destruction of at least eight aircraft.

From Stockport, Blair joined the RAF in March 1937. After completing his flying training, he was posted to No. 85 Squadron and was sent to France with this unit on the outbreak of the Second World War. He achieved his first aerial victories during the Battle of France and was awarded the Distinguished Flying Cross. Once the campaign in France was over, he was transferred to No. 151 Squadron and flew in the Battle of Britain, claiming more aerial victories. In July 1941 he was given command of No. 1453 Flight, a night fighter unit, and led this until being rested in September the following year by which time he had been twice mentioned in despatches. He returned to operations with No. 25 Squadron in June 1943 and a few months later took command of No. 613 Squadron. He remained in the RAF in the postwar period, rising to the rank of wing commander before his death from polio on 31 October 1953.

== Early life ==
Kenneth Hughes Blair was born on 15 February 1918 in Heaton Moor in Stockport, England. Educated at The Lower School of John Lyon in Harrow, he joined the Royal Air Force (RAF) in March 1937 on a short service commission. He trained at No. 11 Flying Training School at Wittering and in June 1938 was posted to No. 85 Squadron as a pilot officer. This was a newly reformed unit which was based at Debden and equipped with Gloster Gladiator fighters. A few months later it began to reequip with the Hawker Hurricane fighter.

== Second World War ==
On the outbreak of the Second World War, No. 85 Squadron was sent to France as part of the Air Component of the British Expeditionary Force. It flew patrols and was occasionally called upon to intercept intruding Luftwaffe aircraft from its bases in Lille-Seclin and Merville. It saw little action until 10 May 1940, when the Battle of France, the German invasion, commenced. The squadron was immediately and frequently engaged.

=== Battle of France ===
In the morning of 10 May, Blair destroyed a Heinkel He 111 medium bomber to the north of Ghent. In the afternoon, he shot down another He 111 near Arras and probably destroyed a second. After two weeks of constant action in France, the squadron had become non-operational and was back at Debden. Blair, now a flying officer, was awarded the Distinguished Flying Cross (DFC) in recognition of his successes in France. The citation, published on 31 May in The London Gazette, read:

This officer has shown exceptional keenness both before and during the present operations. He has engaged successfully two enemy bomber aircraft, viz., at dawn, one day in May, when he succeeded in being the first off the ground in pursuit of a Heinkel, and at dusk on the same day, when he successfully attacked another Heinkel between Arras and Vitry. He had a very narrow escape when a bomb landed within 20 yards of a room in which he was sleeping. He was badly shaken, but insisted on volunteering and taking part in a patrol over Maastricht, when he engaged two Messerschmitt 109's.

— London Gazette, No. 34860, 31 May 1940.

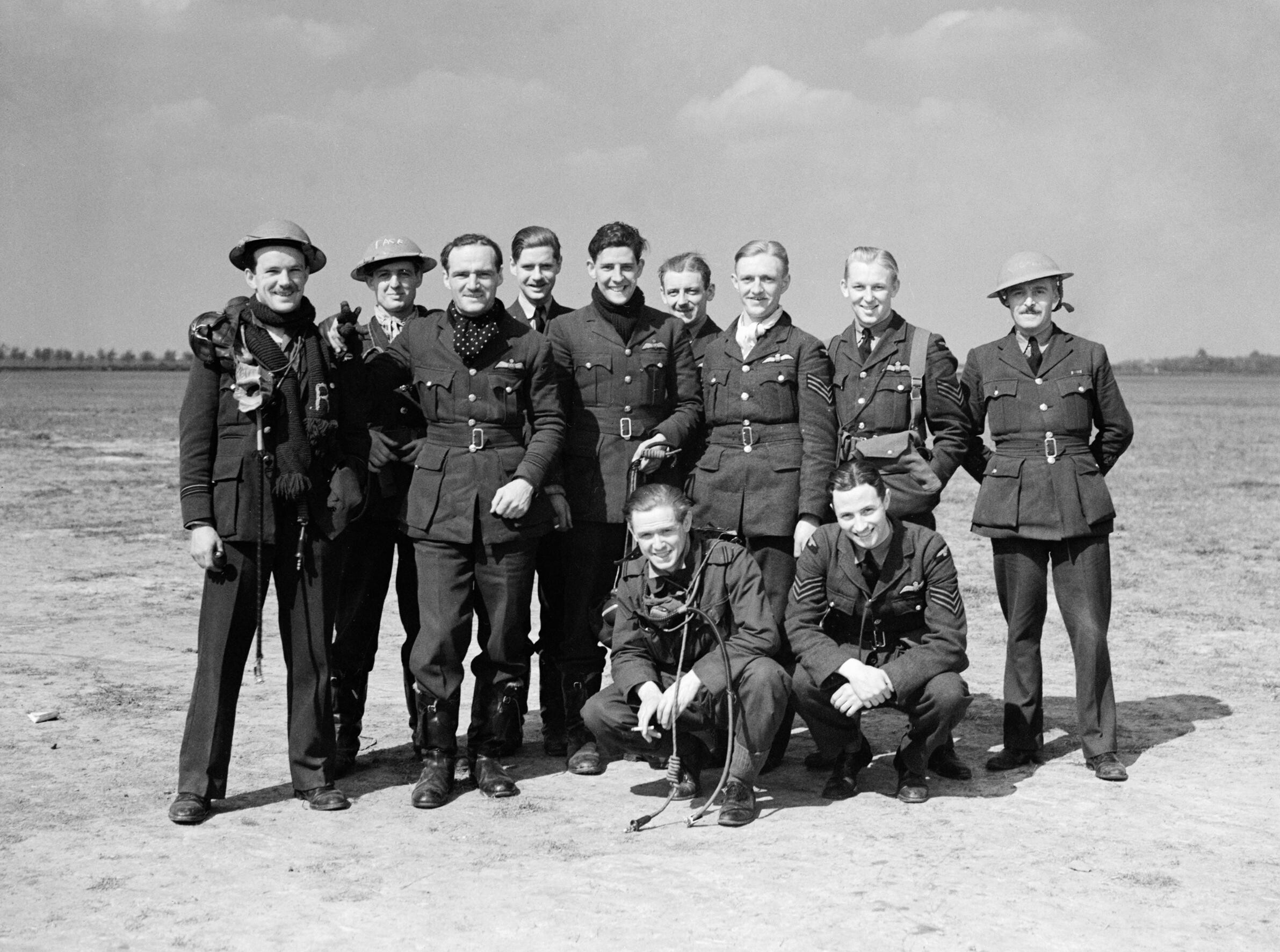
Pilots of No. 85 Squadron at Lille-Seclin airfield, 10 May 1940; Blair is kneeling front left

=== Battle of Britain ===
Blair was presented with his DFC by King George VI in a ceremony at Hornchurch late the following month. By this time he had been posted to No. 151 Squadron. This was equipped with Hurricanes and based Martlesham Heath from where it would become heavily engaged in the Battle of Britain, often intercepting Luftwaffe aircraft over, and on the approaches to, the English Channel. Blair probably destroyed a Messerschmitt Bf 110 heavy fighter on 29 July. He shot down a Messerschmitt Bf 109 fighter over the English Channel on 5 August and on The Hardest Day, 18 August, destroyed one Bf 110 and damaged a second to the east of Burnham. He probably shot down a He 111 to the west of North Weald on 24 August. Blair destroyed a Junkers Ju 88 medium bomber over Rochford on 30 August and the following day, damaged one Dornier Do 17 medium bomber and shot down a second, both near Hornchurch. Earlier in the day he claimed a Bf 109 as probably destroyed near Ramsgate.

No. 151 Squadron moved north to Digby at the start of September for a period of less intensive operations, carrying out convoy patrols. Blair shared in the destruction of a Ju 88 to the east of the Humber on 30 September and the following month he was promoted to flight lieutenant. A Do 17 was claimed as destroyed by Blair and another pilot to the southeast of Skegness on 9 November but in fact it returned to Gilze-Rijen in Holland with wounded crew aboard. Blair probably destroyed a Ju 88 near Grantham on 15 January 1941, his final aerial victory.

=== Night fighting duties ===
By this time No. 151 Squadron was also engaged in night fighting duties, having been provided with the Boulton Paul Defiant turret fighter for this work the previous month. However, it did not see much action as it patrolled the Midlands at night. In July Blair took command of No. 1453 Flight. Based at Wittering, this flew the Turbinlite, which was a Douglas A-20 Havoc night intruder equipped with a searchlight in its nose. Cooperating with No. 151 Squadron, when carrying out interception missions at night, it would use its radar equipment to locate enemy aircraft, then illuminate them with the searchlight once spotted so that an accompanying Defiant could endeavour to shoot it down. The flight also developed the tactic of dropping flares on low flying aircraft to illuminate it for the Defiant but this was never deployed successfully.

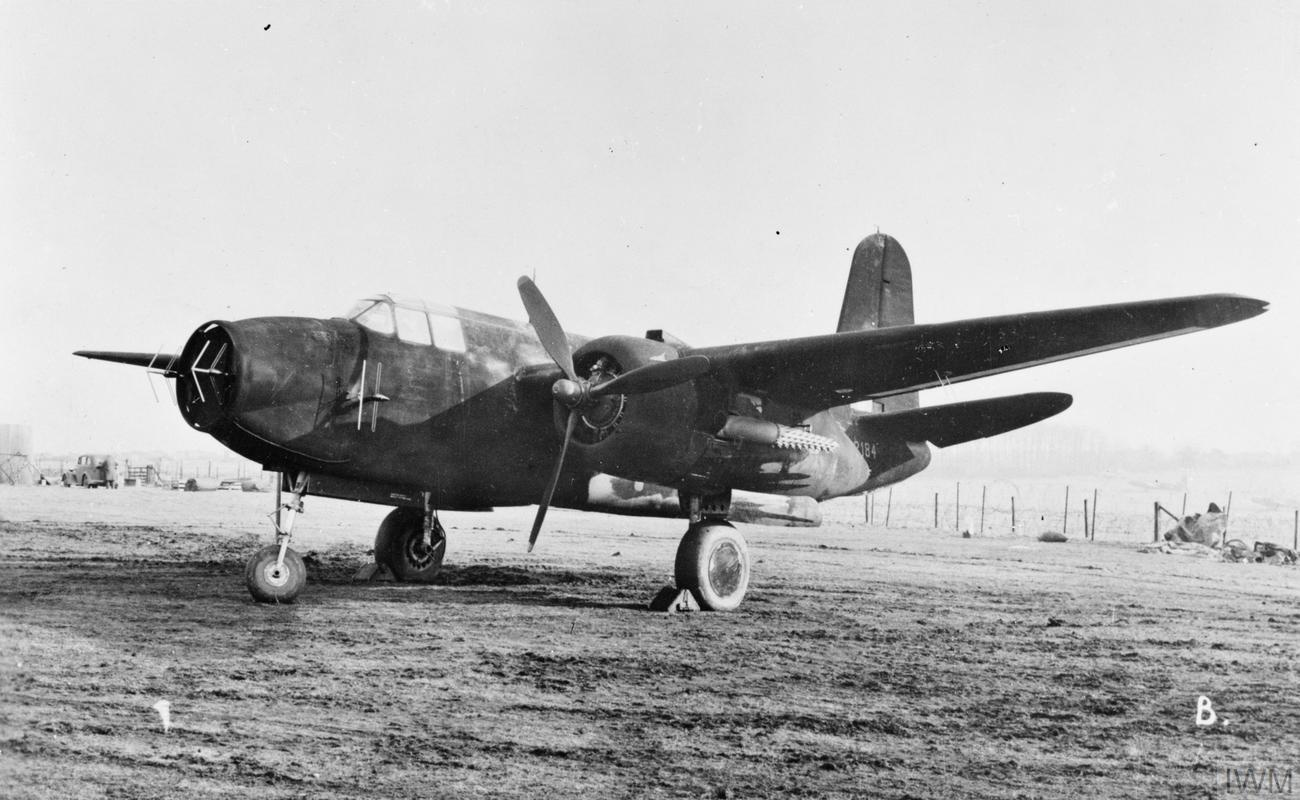
A Turbinlite Douglas A-20 Havoc

Mentioned in despatches on 24 September 1941, Blair was promoted to temporary squadron leader later in the year. He continued to lead the flight until September 1942 at which time he was rested. A few months previously, he had again been mentioned in despatches. He returned to operations in June 1943 with an appointment as flight commander at No. 25 Squadron. This was based at Church Fenton and equipped with de Havilland Mosquito night fighters for intruder missions to France and patrols over the Bay of Biscay.

In October Blair was promoted to acting wing commander and appointed commander of No. 613 Squadron. Based at Lasham, he oversaw the unit's conversion from the North American Mustang fighter to the Mosquito. As part of the Second Tactical Air Force, the squadron was tasked with carrying out targeted bombing raids in German-occupied Europe. Blair was part of the squadron's first operational sortie with the Mosquito, carried out on 19 December. He relinquished command in February 1944, by which time his squadron leader rank had been made substantive. He was awarded a Bar to his DFC the following May.

== Postwar career ==
Blair remained in the RAF in the postwar period and was granted a permanent commission as a squadron leader on 1 October 1950. He was promoted to wing commander at the start of 1952. Serving at Lindholme, Blair took ill with polio and died on 31 October 1953. Buried at Hatfield Cemetery near Doncaster, he was survived by his wife Ruth, who he had married three years previously.

Blair is credited with having destroyed eight aircraft, two of which shared with other pilots, and damaged three others. He is believed to have also probably destroyed six aircraft.
