= No. 1458 Flight RAF =

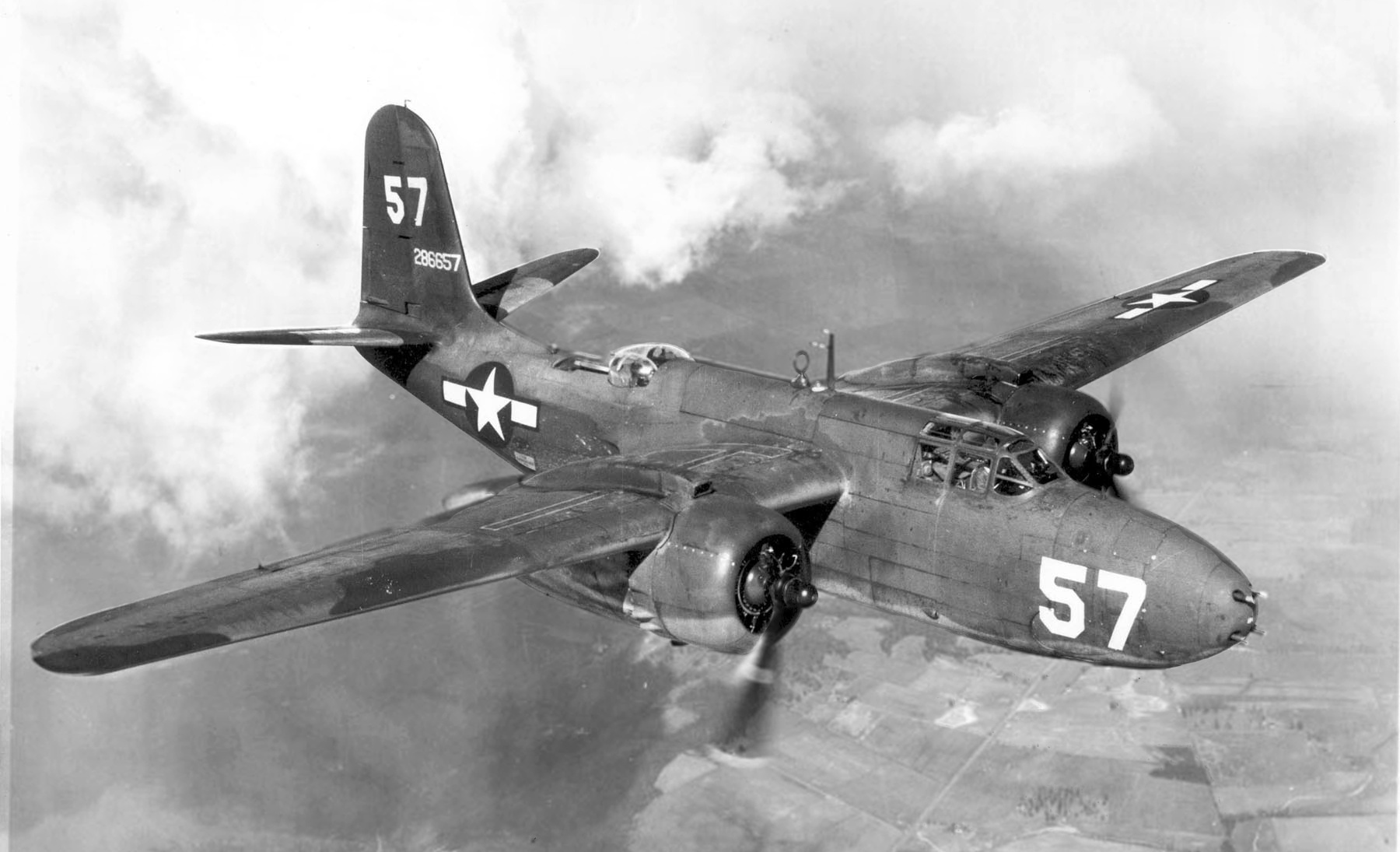
- An A-20 Havoc of the USAAF, like the ones used by the flight
- Active: 6 Dec 1941 – 8 Sep 1942
- Country: United Kingdom
- Branch: Royal Air Force
- Role: Night Fighter (Turbinlite)
- Part of: No. 10 Group RAF, Fighter Command

Insignia
- Squadron Badge heraldry: No known badge
- Squadron Codes: No known identification code for the flight is known to have been carried

No. 1458 (Fighter) Flight was formed at RAF Middle Wallop on 6 December 1941, from elements of No. 93 Squadron RAF, equipped with Turbinlite Douglas Boston and Douglas Havoc aircraft. On operations they cooperated with the Hawker Hurricanes of 245 Squadron. The flight was replaced with 537 Squadron on 8 September 1942 (not on 2 September due to administrative reasons) but only officially disbanded as late as 25 January 1943. 537 Sqn, which had taken over men and machines, carried on flying the Turbinlite Bostons and Havocs till the system was abandoned on 25 January 1943, when Turbinlite squadrons were, due to lack of success on their part and the rapid development of AI radar, thought to be superfluous.

== Aircraft operated ==
Aircraft operated by no. 1458 Flight RAF, data from
From	To	Aircraft	Version
6 December 1941	8 September 1942	Douglas Havoc	Mk.I (Turbinlite)
6 December 1941	8 September 1942	Douglas Havoc	Mk.I
6 December 1941	8 September 1942	Douglas Havoc	Mk.II
6 December 1941	8 September 1942	Douglas Boston	Mk.III (Turbinlite)

== Flight bases ==
Bases and airfields used by no. 1458 Flight RAF, data from
From	To	Base
6 December 1941	8 September 1942	RAF Middle Wallop, Hampshire

== Commanding officers ==
Officers commanding no. 1458 Flight RAF, data from
From	To	Name
6 December 1941	May 1942	S/Ldr. C.R. Stewart
May 1942	8 September 1942	S/Ldr. P.L. Burke, AFC
