= Skydive Hibaldstow =

- Legal status: Training school (registered company is Side Target Ltd)
- Purpose: Parachute training in North Lincolnshire
- Location: Hibaldstow Airfield, North Lincolnshire, UK, DN20 9NN
- Affiliations: British Parachute Association
- Website: Skydive Hibaldstow

Skydive Hibaldstow is a parachuting and skydiving drop zone centre in Hibaldstow, North Lincolnshire, England. Skydive Hibaldstow is affiliated with the skydiving company British Skydiving.

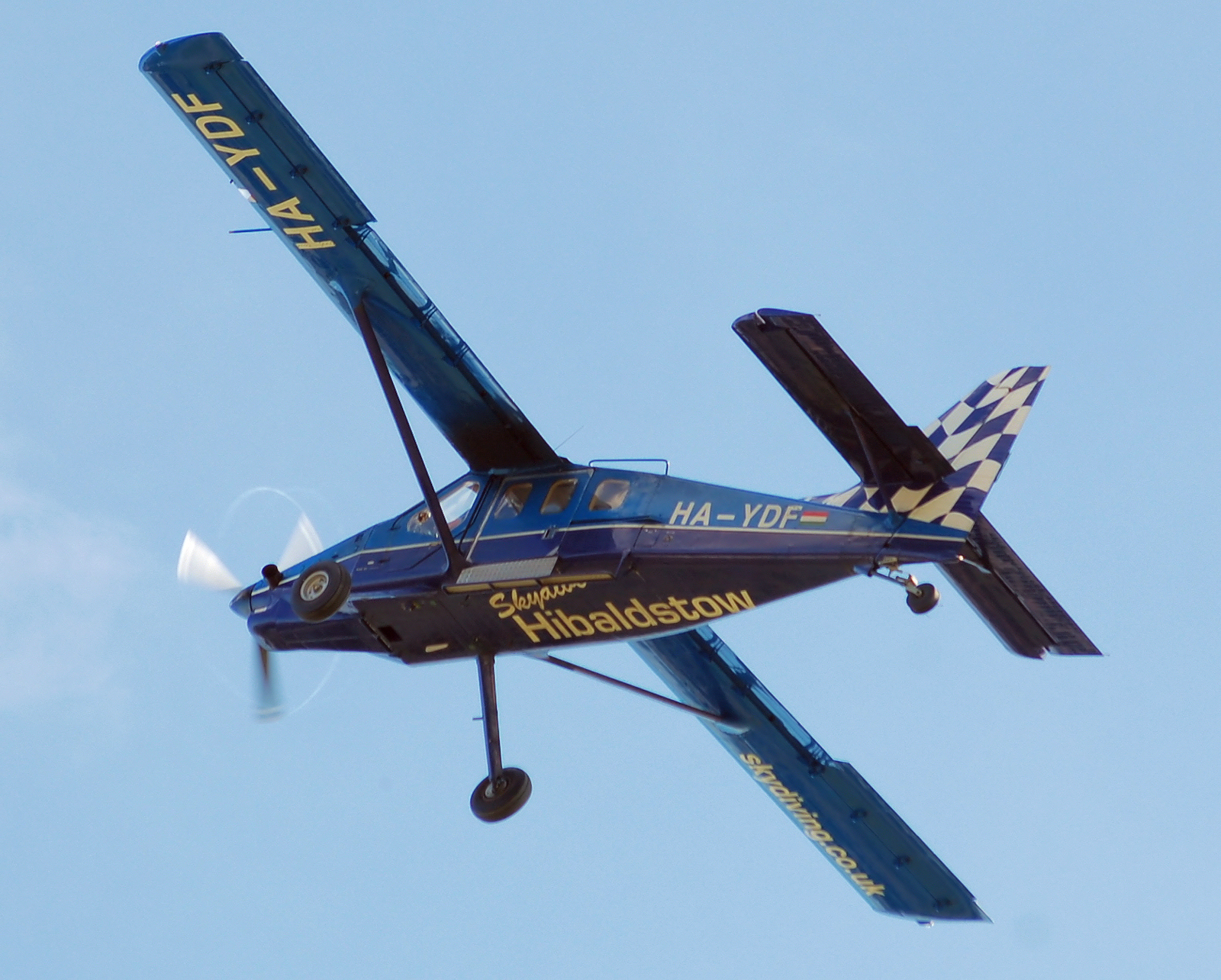
A Technoavia SM92 Finist of Skydive Hibaldstow lifts skydivers to the jump altitude at Hibaldstow.

== History ==
First opened in May 1941, the airfield served as RAF Hibaldstow, a former satellite fighter airfield for RAF Kirton in Lindsey. During World War II, RAF squadrons No. 255 and No. 253 were based out of Hibaldstow. It also served as a satellite of RAF Kirton-in-Lindsey; afterwards it changed its function to fulfill a training role before eventually closing in May 1945.

Skydive Hibaldstow has its origins from several early parachuting clubs dating back to the 1960s. These clubs included Lincoln Pathfinders, Leeds Bradford Parachute Club, and the Doncaster Parachute Club. For instance, the Doncaster Parachute Club started in the early 1980s. The operation then moved in 1992 to its present location due to industrial development in which the runway was dug up and replaced with warehousing.

== Events and training ==
Skydive Hibaldstow was the host of the National Championships each year and held a range of events which included the following:

- An annual 28-way formation skydiving sequential competition. This event has since ended after being run from 2005 to 2015.
- A drop zone formation skydiving bigway record attempt. In 2007, this was set at 50 and in 2009 the record was increased to a 60-way formation.
- BS Coaching Roadshows for freefly, formation skydiving, and speed skydiving.
- Canopy coaching, canopy formation, regular wingsuit flocking, and FS bigway weekends.
- The European Skydiving League finals were also held for the first time at Hibaldstow in 2009.
- The British Collegiate Parachute Association (BCPA) nationals were held in 2015 and 2016.
- The annual Halloween 10-way Speed Frostbite Friendly competition was yet another event.
- The hosted the UK Skydiving League competition which acted as a regional grand-prix type event.
- There are also Safety and Packing days.
- Instructor courses are also given.

In addition to these events, Skydive Hibaldstow is a centre for team training including back-to-back jumping where a skydiver or team can make a number of jumps by using more than one set of equipment. After landing from the first jump, the equipment is handed to a qualified parachute packer and the parachutist then meets the same aircraft they just jumped from as it lands on the runway with a second set of equipment.

== National Championships ==
In 1996, The National Championships were first held at Hibaldstow. Except for one year, they have continued to host the competition. The disciplines include 4-way and 8-way formation skydiving, freefly, freestyle, speed skydiving, and VFS (vertical formation skydiving). Two weekends (Saturday to Monday) are set aside every August with the events being split equally between them.

Year 2009 saw the 4-way, 8-way, and VFS disciplines all completed in a single day totaling some 143 take-offs by the fleet of 3 aircraft. In 2014, a record 78 teams took part (see below for more information).

== Records ==
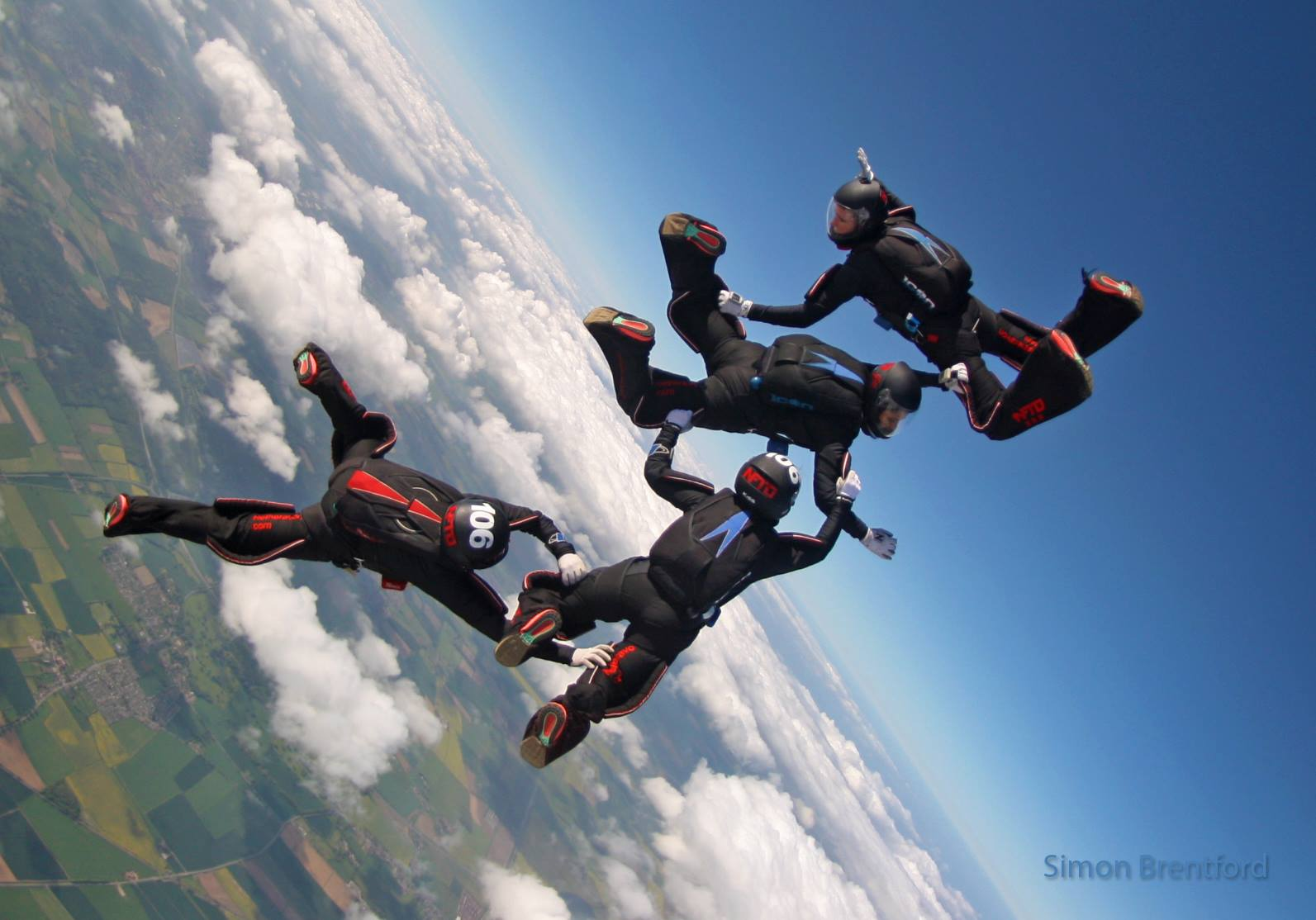
Formation skydiving jump by British Women's team NFTO

- 14 September 2024 - UK Formation Skydiving Sequential Record - A 2-point complete separation 42-way record was built over the skies of Hibaldstow and was organised by Siân Stokes.
- 25 May 2019 - UK Head-up Freefly Record - Over 2 days, first an 18-way formation was built, then on the second day, this was increased to a 21-way formation.
- 8 July 2018 - UK Skydivers Over Sixty (SOS) record - A new 18-way formation was built over the drop zone in perfect conditions.
- 6 September 2015 - UK Head-down Freefly Record - Using 3 Dornier G92 aircraft, a formation of 37 freeflyers built over beautiful blue skies over Hibaldstow.
- 9 August 2015 - Two records were set for the largest UK Wingsuit Formation. A 13-way (13 person) wingsuit record was first set and then a few hours later a larger 14-way.
- 10 July 2015 - A record 403 Tandem Skydives were completed within 24 hours and was organized by Skydive Hibaldstow and Teenage Cancer Trust (as part of the Skydive for Stephen event).
- 6 September 2014 - The largest Formation Skydiving National Championships in 2014 took place at the drop zone with 78 teams taking part (75 teams of 4way and 3 VFS).
- 29 September 2013 - A group of 8 Head-up Freefly jumpers created a formation. An unofficial 11-way record was also completed, but this did not hold for long enough to be counted as a record.
- 22 September 2013 - An attempt was made at the UK Freefly Head-down record and after 8 attempts, they successfully built a formation of 30 jumpers together.
- 1 September 2012 - A record total of 76 teams registered for the National Championships in formation skydiving (FS & VFS combined).
- 28 August 2011 – A group of 28 of the best UK freeflyers set a record for the largest freefly formation. This was organized by the British VFS team, the Bad Lieutenants and beat the previous record of a 22-man formation set in 2010 at the same drop zone.
- 13 August 2011 – The drop zone hosts the largest Open National Skydiving Championships in the world and some 55 4-way teams take part.
- 10 July 2011 – A UK record of 130 charity tandem skydivers jumped in a single day. They were raising money for Khalsa Aid. This surpasses a similar record set at the same drop zone in 2010.
- 22 May 2011 – The first ever UK women's head-down record was set at the drop zone consisting of eight jumpers flying in a head-down formation and was organized by Anna Howerski and Catriona Adam.

== Deaths ==
- Stephen Hilder, aged 20, died in 2003 following a parachute sabotage during a competition at Skydive Hibaldstow.
- A 44 year old man from Essex died in 2009 at Skydive Hibaldstow.
- Martin Skybel, aged 39, was an skydive instructor and photographer at Skydive Hibaldstow who committed suicide in 2022.
- Nathan Odinson, aged 33, was a skydiving photographer at Skydive Hibaldstow who died during a base-jump in Thailand in 2024.

== News items ==
- Tandem skydivers raise £16,500 for charity 2024
- UK Headdown Record set in September 2015
- Stephen Stutton helps break the 24-hour World Tandem Skydiving record 2015
- Skydiver dies in August 2009
