= Bad Lieutenants =

The Bad Lieutenants are a United Kingdom skydiving team started in 2006. They began as a freeflying team and competed at both national and international level until in 2006 and 2007. In 2008 they took a break due to Matthew O'Riordan's ACL injury, and in 2009 reformed with two new members as a vertical formation skydiving team. Based on their performance in the World Cup in 2009, coming third, they have received considerable support from the British Parachute Association and skydiving manufacturers.

The VFS team are sponsored by Target Skysports, a dropzone located at the Lincolnshire village of Hibaldstow.

== Team members ==
Matthew O'Riordan – Title: Lieutenant Rabbi, Jumps: 2,500+, Lives: London, UK.

Jim Harris – Title: Lieutenant Jesus, Jumps: 7,000+, Lives: Seville, Spain.

James Davies – Title: Lieutenant Hammer, Jumps: 2,500+, Lives: London, UK.

Martin Reynolds – Title: Lieutenant Pie, Jumps: 3,500+, Lives: Leamington Spa, UK.

Daniel Parker – Title: Lieutenant Football, Jumps: 3,500, Lives: Manchester, UK.

== Photos ==
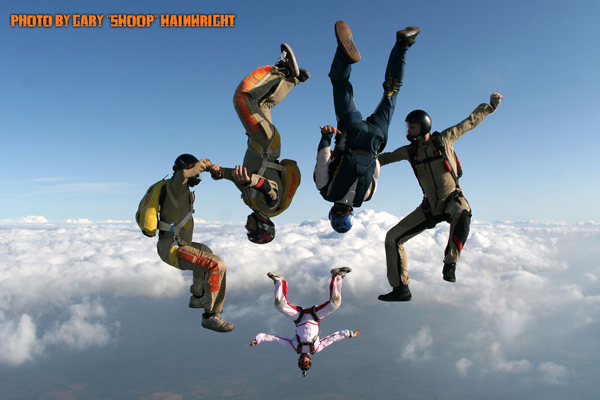

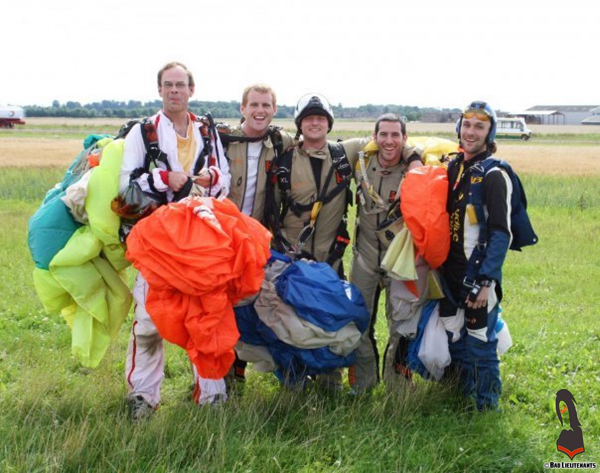
