= No. 1457 Flight RAF =

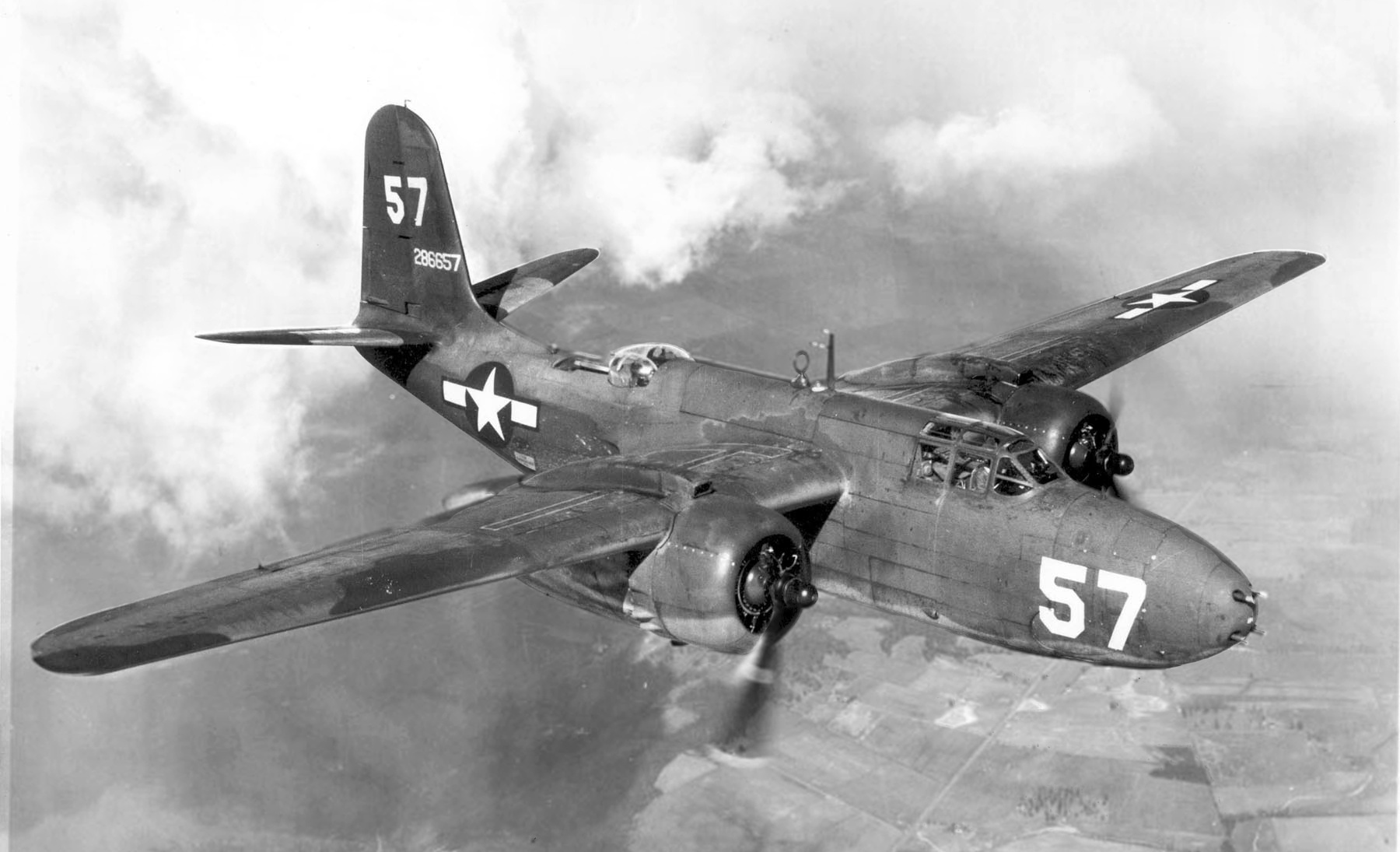
- An A-20 Havoc of the USAAF, like the ones used by the flight
- Active: 15 Sep 1941 – 8 Sep 1942
- Country: United Kingdom
- Branch: Royal Air Force
- Role: Night Fighter (Turbinlite)
- Part of: No. 10 Group RAF, Fighter Command

Insignia
- Squadron Badge heraldry: No known badge
- Squadron Codes: No known identification code for the flight is known to have been carried

No. 1457 (Fighter) Flight was formed at RAF Colerne on 15 September 1941, and was equipped with Turbinlite Douglas Boston and Douglas Havoc aircraft. On operations they cooperated with the Hawker Hurricanes of 247 Squadron. By 15 November 1941 the flight moved to RAF Predannack, Cornwall. During its operational life the flight had three sightings of possible enemy aircraft. The first occasion was on 24 June 1942, when the flight lit up a suspected Ju 88 and the satellite fighters of 247 sqn fired - on a RAF Short Stirling. Others sightings occurred on 27 June and in August, but no enemy aircraft was shot down. The flight was replaced with 536 Squadron on 8 September 1942 (not on 2 September due to administrative reasons) but officially disbanded as late as 31 December 1942.

536 Sqn, which had taken over men and machines, carried on flying the Turbinlite Bostons and Havocs till the system was abandoned on 25 January 1943, when Turbinlite squadrons were, due to lack of success on their part and the rapid development of AI radar, thought to be superfluous.

== Aircraft operated ==
Aircraft operated by no. 1457 Flight RAF, data from
From	To	Aircraft	Version
15 September 1941	8 September 1942	Douglas Havoc	Mk.I (Turbinlite)
15 September 1941	8 September 1942	Douglas Havoc	Mk.I
15 September 1941	8 September 1942	Douglas Havoc	Mk.II (Turbinlite)
15 September 1941	8 September 1942	Douglas Havoc	Mk.II
15 September 1941	8 September 1942	Douglas Boston	Mk.II (Turbinlite)
15 September 1941	8 September 1942	Douglas Boston	Mk.III (Turbinlite)

== Flight bases ==
Bases and airfields used by no. 1457 Flight RAF, data from
From	To	Base
15 September 1941	15 November 1941	RAF Colerne, Wiltshire
15 November 1941	8 September 1942	RAF Predannack, Cornwall

== Commanding officers ==
Officers commanding no. 1457 Flight RAF, data from
From	To	Name
15 September 1941	May 1942	S/Ldr. J.R. Watson
May 1942	8 September 1942	S/Ldr. Motion
