= No. 536 Squadron RAF =

Defunct flying squadron of the Royal Air Force

- Active: 8 Sep 1942 – 25 Jan 1943
- Country: United Kingdom
- Branch: Royal Air Force
- Role: Turbinlite nightfighter squadron
- Part of: No. 10 Group RAF, Fighter Command

No. 536 Squadron RAF was one of the ten Turbinlite nightfighter squadrons of the Royal Air Force during the Second World War.

== History ==
No. 536 Squadron was formed at RAF Predannack, Cornwall on 8 September 1942, from No. 1457 (Turbinlite) Flight, as part of No. 10 Group RAF in Fighter Command. Instead of operating only Turbinlite and -rudimentary- Airborne Intercept (AI) radar equipped aircraft (Havocs and Bostons) and working together with a normal nightfighter unit, such as in their case No. 247 Squadron RAF while still 1457 Flight, the unit now also flew with their own Hawker Hurricanes. It was disbanded at RAF Fairwood Common, Glamorganshire on 25 January 1943, when Turbinlite squadrons were, due to lack of success on their part and the rapid development of AI radar, thought to be superfluous.

== Aircraft operated ==
Aircraft operated by No. 536 Squadron RAF, data from
From	To	Aircraft	Version
8 September 1942	25 January 1943	Douglas Havoc	Mk.I (Turbinlite)
8 September 1942	25 January 1943	Douglas Havoc	Mk.II (Turbinlite)
8 September 1942	25 January 1943	Douglas Boston	Mk.II (Turbinlite)
8 September 1942	25 January 1943	Hawker Hurricane	Mk.IIc

== Squadron bases ==
Bases and airfields used by No. 536 Squadron RAF, data from
From	To	Base
8 September 1942	27 October 1942	RAF Predannack, Cornwall
27 October 1942	25 January 1943	RAF Fairwood Common, Glamorganshire

== Commanding officers ==
Officers commanding No. 536 Squadron RAF, data from
From	To	Name
8 September 1942	25 January 1943	S/Ldr. Motion
