= No. 1453 Flight RAF =

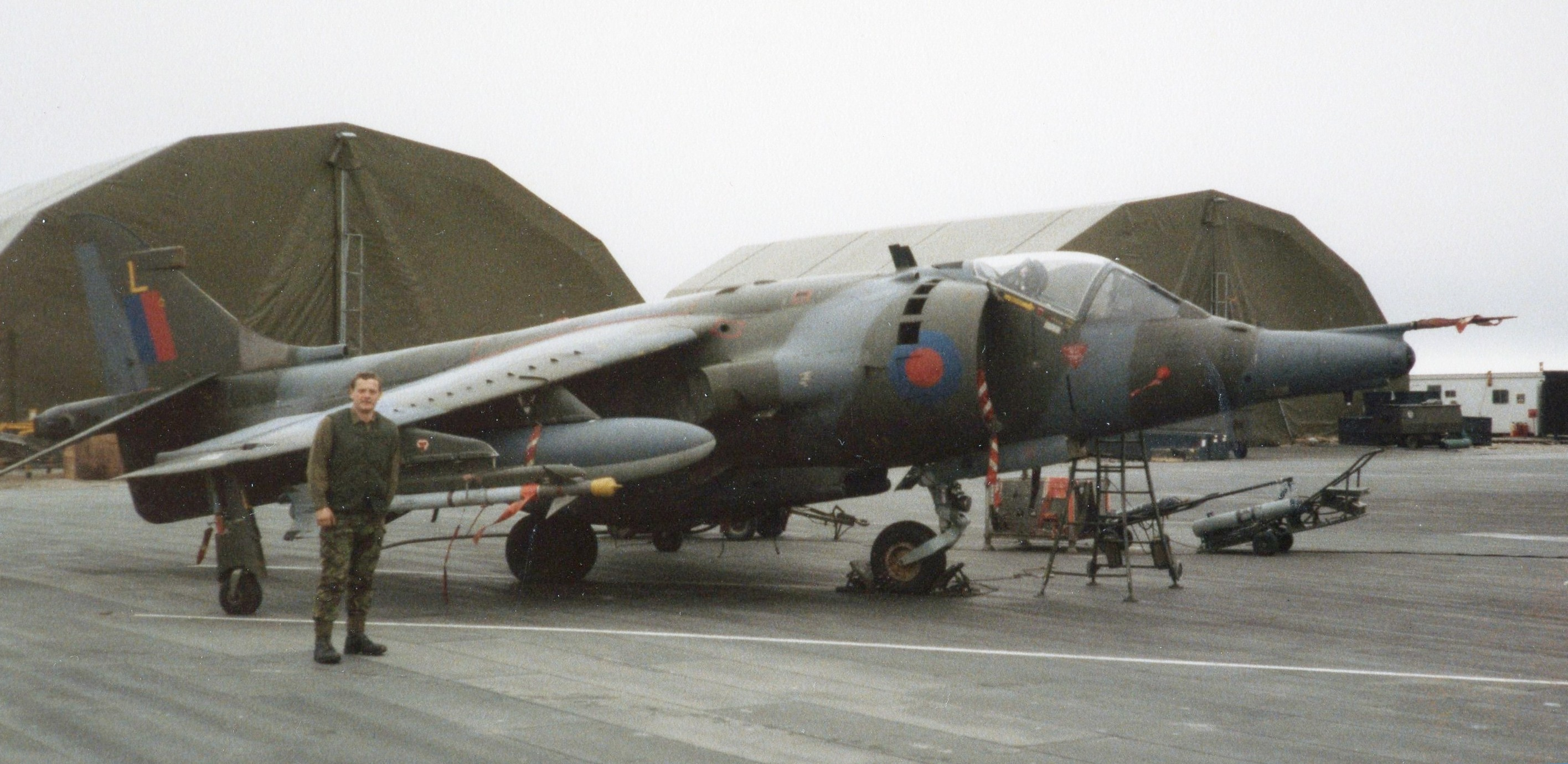
- 'L' for Lima, on the pan at RAF Stanley
- Active: 10 Jul 1941 – 2 Sep 1942; 5 Jun 1953 – 30 Jun 1956; 20 Aug 1983 – Jun 1985
- Country: United Kingdom
- Branch: Royal Air Force
- Role: Night Fighter (Turbinlite); Airborne Early Warning (ELINT?); Ground Attack / Air Defence
- Part of: No. 12 Group RAF, Fighter Command (1941–1942)

Insignia
- Squadron Badge heraldry: no known badge
- Squadron codes: no known identification code for the flight is known to have been carried

Number 1453 (Turbinlite) Flight RAF was an independent flight of the Royal Air Force (RAF), first formed in 1941 as a night-fighter unit at RAF Wittering, equipped with Douglas Turbinlite Havoc aircraft. In the 1950s, the flight was briefly resurrected as an early warning flight, and during the 1980s, it was employed as a ground attack and air defence unit on the Falkland Islands.

== History ==
=== 1453 Flt and the Turbinlite Havocs ===
After the fall of France in 1940, outstanding contracts for Douglas DB-7 and DB-7A medium bomber aircraft were appropriated by the British Purchasing Commission. The relatively low availability of aircraft, and the good performance of the DB-7/A, named Havoc in UK service, made them suitable for use as intruders and night-fighters.

Thirty-one of the DB-7's (Havoc I) were converted to carry the 2,700 million candela (2.7Gcd) Helmore Turbinlite searchlight in the nose, as well as Airborne Interception Mk.IV (A.I. Mk.IV) radar. These aircraft were to operate in conjunction with Hawker Hurricane night fighters, illuminating the targets after tracking them with the radar, for the Hurricane fighters to despatch.

1453 (Turbinlite) Flight was one of the flights, formed on 10 July 1941, especially to use the Turbinlite Havoc. Commanded by Flight Lieutenant Kenneth Blair, it operated in conjunction with Hawker Hurricanes of No. 151 Squadron RAF and No. 486 Squadron RNZAF, also housed, like 1453 Flight, at RAF Wittering.

Thirty-nine DB-7A's (Havoc II) were also converted to use the Turbinlite searchlights, and these also saw service with the Turbinlite flights and the squadrons formed from the flights from 2 September 1942, 1453 Flt becoming No. 532 Squadron RAF (532 Sqn) on 8 September 1942 (not on 2 September due to administrative reasons) and the flight officially disbanded as late as 31 January 1943.

Results of the combined operations were not spectacular, (only one confirmed kill with 31 aircraft lost), but valuable experience in the use of the A.I. (Airborne interception) radar was gained. The Helmore Turbinlite was also evaluated as an anti-submarine attack searchlight, but the Leigh Light was found to be superior.

=== AEW Neptunes at RAF Kinloss ===
On 1 November 1952, four Lockheed Neptune MR Mk.1 aircraft (registrations WX547, WX499, WX500, and WX501) formed the complement of Vanguard Flight of Fighter Command at RAF Kinloss, to research and develop tactics for use by Airborne Early Warning aircraft.

=== RAF Topcliffe ===
Disbanded on 5 June 1953, the four Neptune aircraft of Vanguard Flight became the re-formed 1453 (Early Warning) Flight at RAF Topcliffe in Yorkshire. Despite their innocuous public role, the Neptunes of 1453 Flight retained the full armament of the P2V-5 variant with nose, dorsal and tail turrets.

Details of 1453 Flight's operations are few and far between, leading to speculation that they may have been involved in highly classified reconnaissance missions over or near Eastern Bloc countries (more info / evidence required), similar to the US Navy's Martin P4M Mercator ELINT (ELectronic INTelligence) aircraft, and the 'Ghost' North American RB-45 Tornado's that flew with RAF crews and markings from RAF Sculthorpe, over eastern Europe to provide radar images of potential targets for RAF and Strategic Air Command (SAC) bombers.

Neptune flying at RAF Topcliffe continued until 1453 (Airborne Early Warning) Flight was disbanded on 30 June 1956.

=== RAF Stanley, Falkland Islands ===
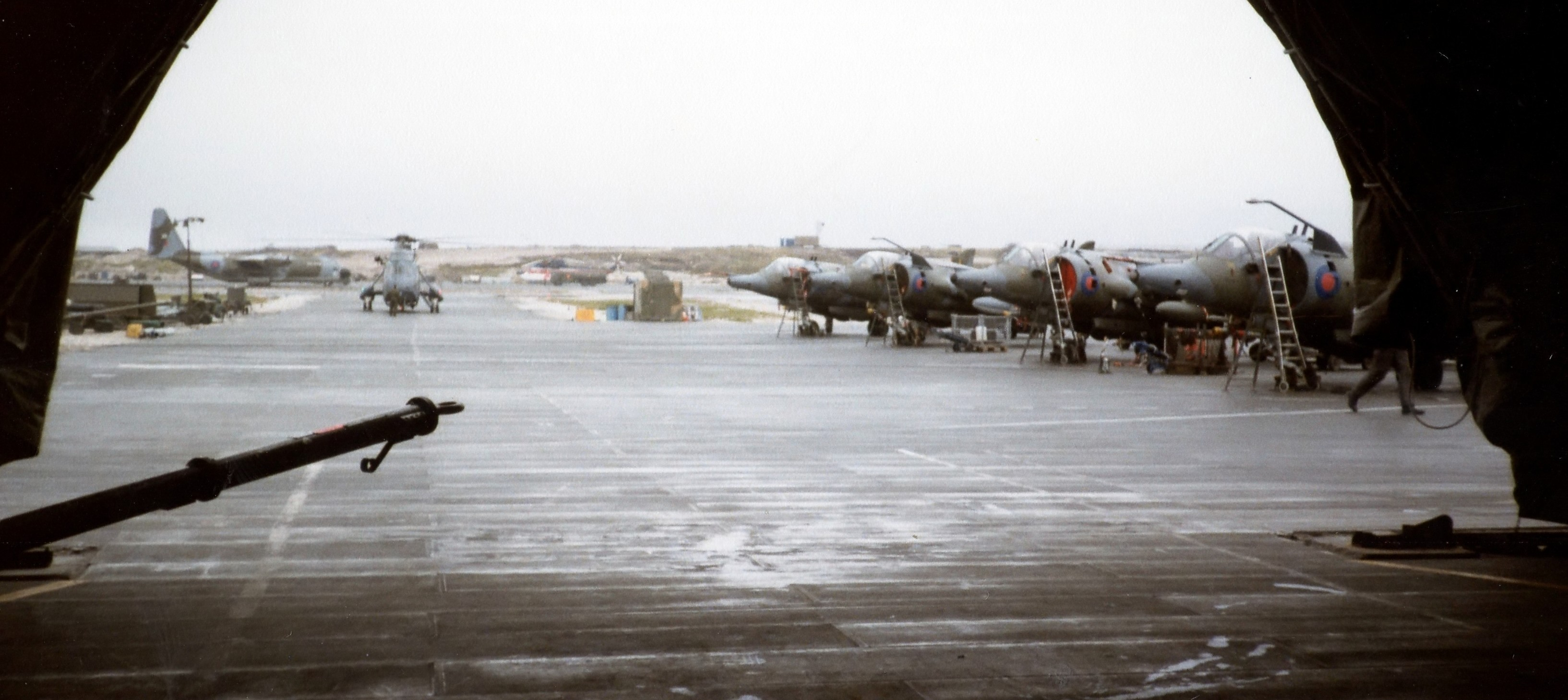
A view across the 1453 Flight pan, runway, and 1312 Flight pan at RAF Stanley.

After the qualified success of RAF Harrier operations in the Falklands conflict, a detachment of six Harrier GR.3A's was established at Stanley airport, which became RAF Stanley, part of BFFI (British Forces Falkland Islands). As the rudimentary facilities at RAF Stanley improved, Harrier Detachment (HarDet) Stanley was made autonomous with the formation of 1453 (Tactical Ground Attack) Flight, operating from a Military Engineering Experimental Establishment (MEXE) pad apron by the side of the runway at the extreme western end. Later, semi-permanent facilities were constructed, with Portakabin offices and RUBB hangars, during the extension and reinforcement of the runway.

The Harriers were tasked initially with mostly air defence of the Falklands garrison. After the arrival of No. 29 Squadron RAF, with their McDonnell-Douglas/Hawker-Siddeley F-4M Phantom FGR.2's from Ascension Island in October 1982, 1453 flight's mission was focused more on ground attack missions, but supplying a back-up quick reaction alert (QRA) in daylight hours.

Operations at RAF Stanley were challenging, with makeshift accommodation, few asphalt roads, army discipline, extreme weather, long supply lines, lacklustre catering supplies (e.g. several weeks with nothing but spinach and beetroot for vegetables), not to mention the close proximity of unclearable minefields, and danger of unexploded ordnance.

The Harriers of 1453 Flight continued flying at Stanley until June 1985, when the new airport / airbase at RAF Mount Pleasant was opened, after which 1453 Flight disbanded and the Harriers were returned to the UK, leaving the air defence of the Falkland Islands to the Phantoms of 23 Squadron which had relieved 29 Squadron in October 1983.

== Aircraft operated ==
Aircraft operated by no. 1453 Flight RAF
from	to	aircraft	version
10 July 1941	8 September 1942	Douglas Havoc	Mk.I (Turbinlite)
10 July 1941	8 September 1942	Douglas Havoc	Mk.I
10 July 1941	8 September 1942	Douglas Boston	Mk.II
10 July 1941	8 September 1942	Douglas Boston	Mk.III (Turbinlite)
5 June 1953	30 June 1956	Lockheed Neptune	MR.1
20 August 1983	June 1985	Hawker-Siddeley Harrier	GR.3A

== Flight bases ==
Bases and airfields used by no. 1453 Flight RAF
from	to	base	remarks
10 July 1941	8 September 1942	RAF Wittering, Cambridgeshire	Det. at RAF Hibaldstow, Lincolnshire
5 June 1953	30 June 1956	RAF Topcliffe, Yorkshire	
20 August 1983	June 1985	RAF Stanley, Falkland Islands	
