= List of surviving Douglas A-20 Havocs =

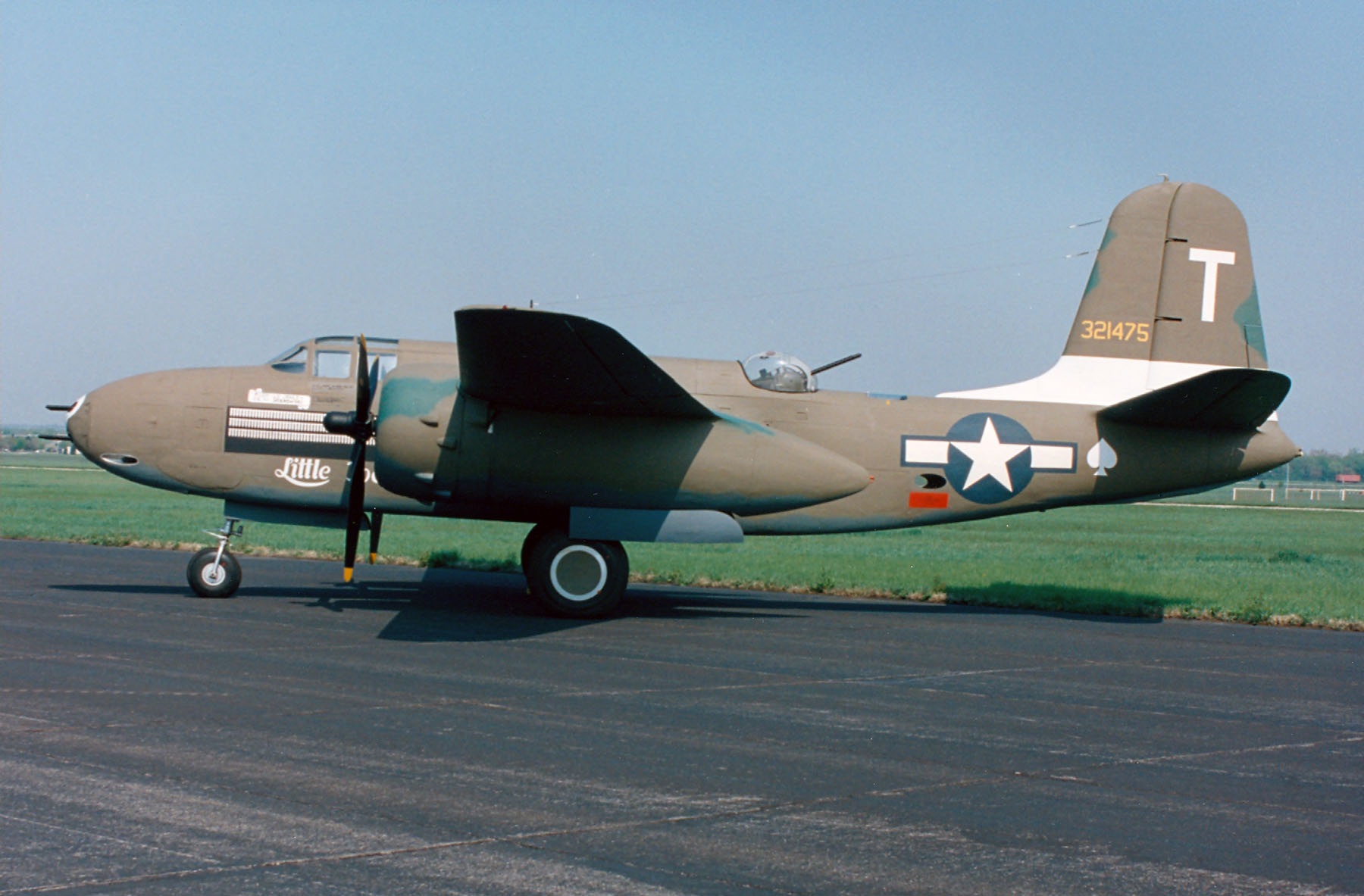
A-20G Little Joe at the National Museum of the United States Air Force

The Douglas A-20 Havoc is an American attack/light bomber/night fighter aircraft of World War II.

On September 20, 1944 the last Douglas A-20K Havoc was produced by Douglas, with 7098 having been built by Douglas and 380 under license by Boeing. The Havoc was quickly replaced in USAAF service by the Douglas A-26, the RAAF replaced them with Bristol Beaufighters, and the RAF with the de Havilland Mosquito. One of the last substantial users was the Força Aérea Brasileira (Brazilian Air Force) who continued using the A-20 until the late 1950s.

So quickly was the A-20 phased out of service and scrapped that, by the early 1960s, the aircraft was on the verge of extinction with only six complete airframes known in existence. Currently, due to numerous expeditions into the jungles of New Guinea, as well as Russian crash sites, additional restorable airframes are being discovered and the number of intact aircraft growing.

== Surviving aircraft ==
=== Australia ===
On display

A-20G

- 42-86786 The Hell'N Pelican II – RAAF Amberley Heritage Centre Queensland. To be held at Amberley until a facility to hold the aircraft is built at the Papua New Guinea National Museum and Art Gallery in Port Moresby.

Boston III

- RAAF A28-8, RAAF Sqn Code DU-J, RAF s/n AL907 – RAAF Museum, RAAF Base Point Cook in Victoria.

Under restoration or in storage

A-20G

- 42-86615 – in storage at Precision Aerospace at the Wangaratta Airport in Victoria.

=== Brazil ===
On display

A-20K

- 44-0539 – Museu Aeroespacial, Campo dos Afonsos in Rio de Janeiro.

=== Finland ===
Submerged

A-20??

- An A-20 plane was found during the Nord Stream 2 gasline project in 2017. The plane is submerged 100 meters deep in the Baltic Sea, in international waters. The aircraft is intact, which is rare for a plane that has crash-landed at sea. Inside could possibly be the remains of the pilot, as well as active bombs.

=== Papua New Guinea ===
Wrecks

A-20G

- 42-86563 – Stripped wreck abandoned at Yamai Airfield, Madang Province.

=== Poland ===
Under restoration or in storage

A-20

- s/n unknown – Extracted from Baltic Sea floor. To be displayed in Kraków National Museum of Aviation after restoration.

=== Russia ===
On display

A-20G

- 43-10052 – Central Air Force Museum in Moscow.

Under restoration or in storage

A-20H

- 44-0020 – exported from California to Latvia in December 2018, then to UMMC Museum Complex.

=== United Kingdom ===
On display

A-20C

- 41-19393 – partial airframe recovered from Russia. Displayed unrestored at the Wings Museum near Balcombe.

=== United States ===
On display

A-20G

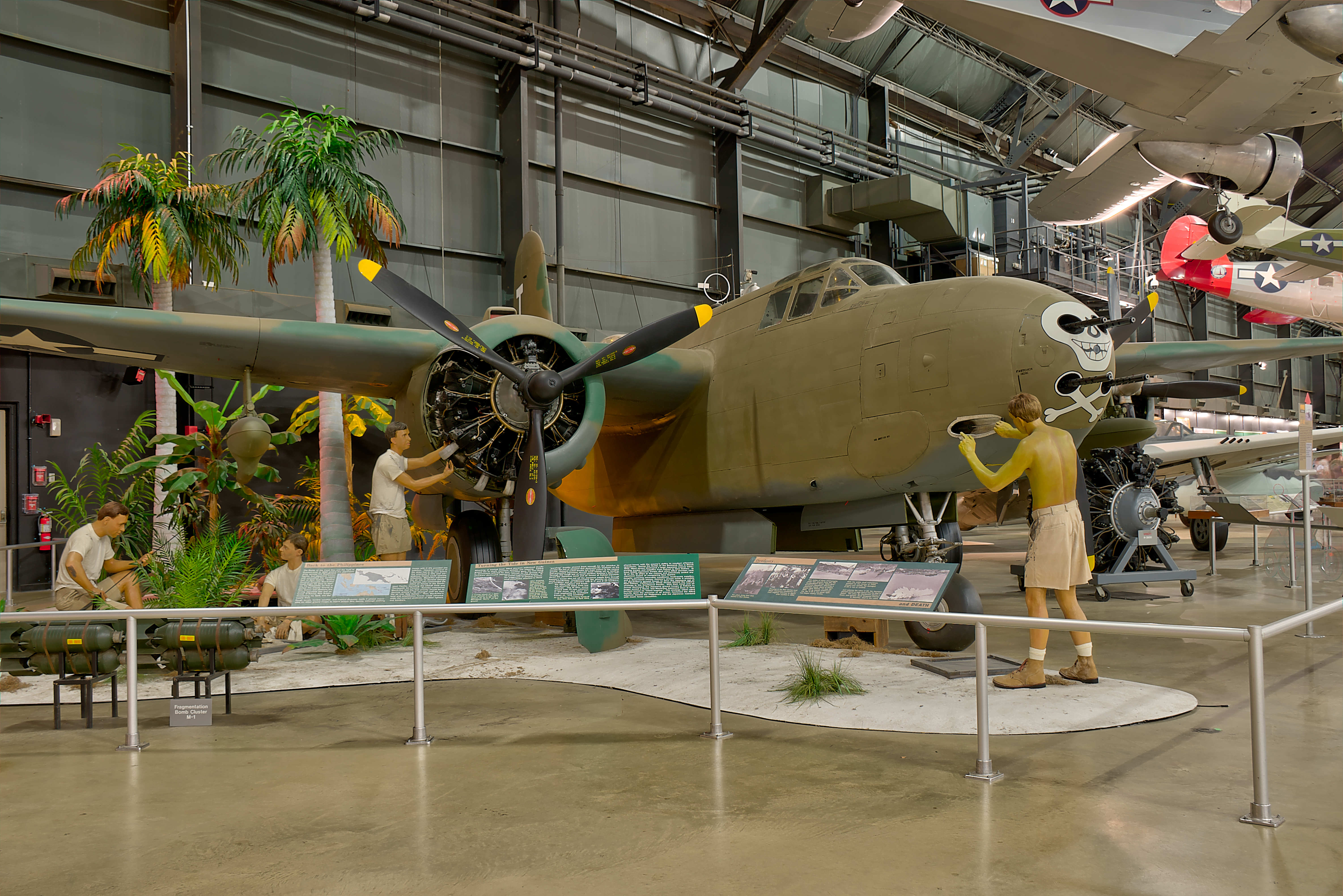
A-20G exhibit at National Museum of the United States Air Force

- 43-22200 Little Joe – National Museum of the United States Air Force at Wright-Patterson AFB in Dayton, Ohio.
- 43-9436 – Pima Air and Space Museum adjacent to Davis-Monthan AFB in Tucson, Arizona. This aircraft was originally nicknamed Big Nig during its World War II service, but due to the racist origins of this name, the museum has opted to restore only the nose art image, not the name.

Under restoration or in storage

A-20G

- 43-21627 – in storage, at Pima Air and Space Museum, owned by MARC, adjacent to Davis-Monthan AFB in Tucson, Arizona.
- 43-21709 – stored awaiting restoration in Chino, California. Owned by Lewis Air Legends in San Antonio, Texas. This aircraft suffered an in-flight engine failure, and crash landed in a field on 16 February 2025.
- 43-22197 – in storage, owned by Fantasy of Flight in Polk City, Florida.

F-3A

- 39-741 – in storage, owned by GossHawk Unlimited in Casa Grande, Arizona.

== See also ==
- List of A-20 Havoc operators
