= No. 532 Squadron RAF =

No. 530 Squadron RAF
- Active: 2 Sep 1942 – 25 Jan 1943
- Country: United Kingdom
- Branch: Royal Air Force
- Role: Turbinlite nightfighter squadron
- Part of: No. 12 Group RAF, Fighter Command

Insignia
- Squadron Codes: QM (Sep 1942 – Jan 1943)

No. 532 Squadron RAF was one of the ten Turbinlite nightfighter squadrons of the Royal Air Force during the Second World War.

== History ==
No. 532 Squadron RAF was formed on 2 September 1942 from 1453 (Turbinlite) Flight, based at RAF Wittering. 1453 Turbinlite Flight had previously operated in conjunction with No. 151 Squadron RAF and No. 486 Squadron RNZAF. It was disbanded at RAF Hibaldstow on 25 January 1943, when the Turbinlite squadrons were, due to lack of success on their part and the rapid development of AI radar, thought to be superfluous.

== Aircraft operated ==
Aircraft operated by no. 532 Squadron RAF, data from
From	To	Aircraft	Version
2 September 1943	25 January 1944	Douglas Havoc	Mks.I, II
2 September 1943	25 January 1944	Douglas Boston	Mk.III
2 September 1943	25 January 1944	Hawker Hurricane	Mks.IIb, IIc

== Squadron bases ==
Bases and airfields used by no. 532 Squadron RAF, data from
From	To	Base	Remark
2 September 1943	9 November 1943	RAF Wittering, Northamptonshire	Det. at RAF Hibaldstow, Lincolnshire
19 November 1943	25 January 1944	RAF Hibaldstow, Lincolnshire	

== Commanding officers ==
Officers commanding no. 532 Squadron RAF, data from
From	To	Name
2 September 1943	25 January 1944	S/Ldr. C.L.W. Stewart
