= No. 1459 Flight RAF =

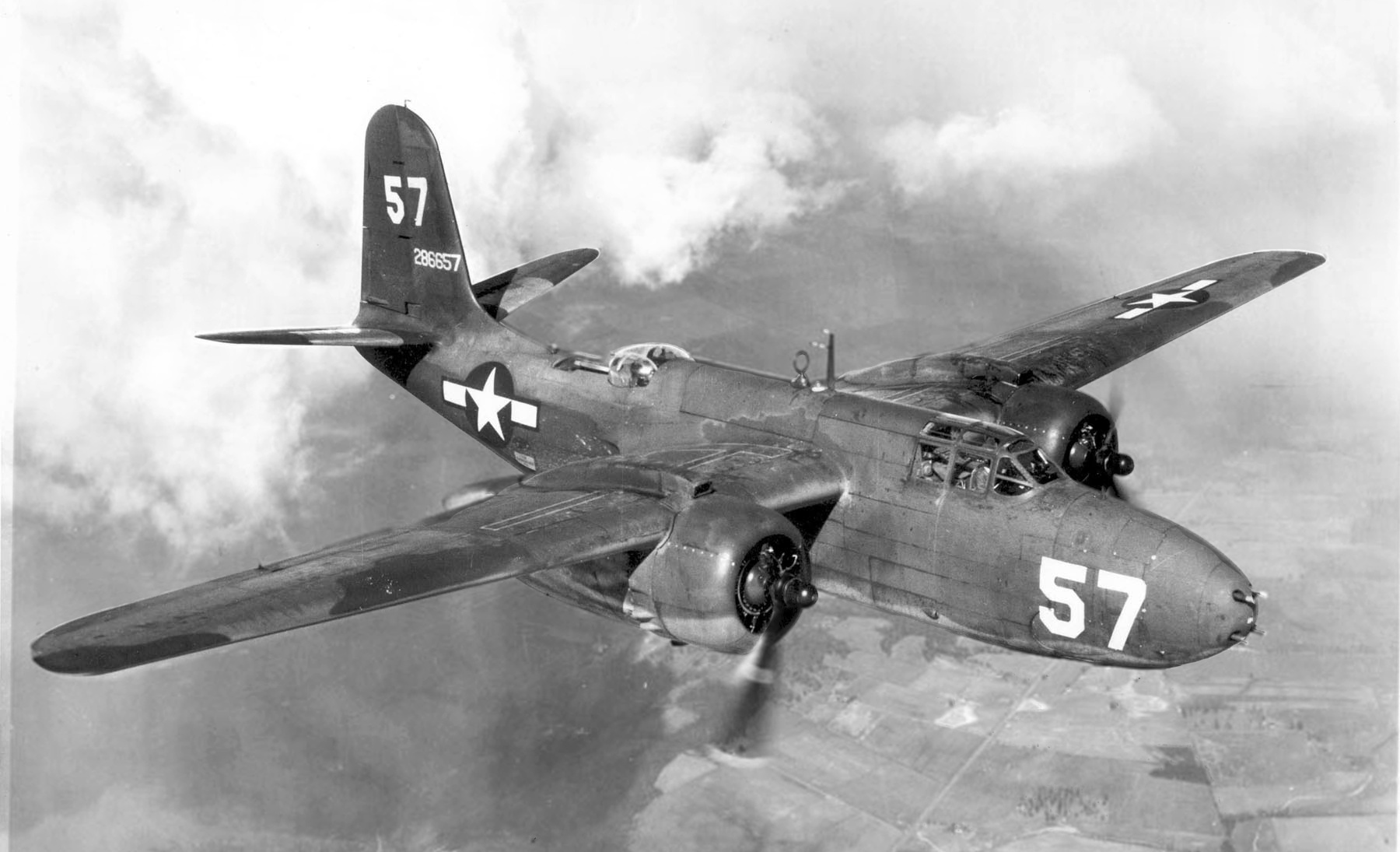
- An A-20 Havoc of the USAAF, like the ones used by the flight
- Active: 20 Sep 1941 – 2 Sep 1942
- Country: United Kingdom
- Branch: Royal Air Force
- Role: Night Fighter (Turbinlite)
- Part of: No. 12 Group RAF, Fighter Command

Insignia
- Squadron Badge heraldry: No known badge
- Squadron Codes: No known identification code for the flight is known to have been carried

No. 1459 (Fighter) Flight was formed at RAF Hunsdon, Hertfordshire on 20 September 1941, equipped with Turbinlite Douglas Boston and Douglas Havoc aircraft. By 21 September 1941 the flight moved to RAF Hibaldstow, Lincolnshire. On operations they cooperated with the Hawker Hurricanes of 253 Squadron.

== Description ==
1459 Flight was perhaps the most successful unit of its kind: after becoming operational in March 1942 they made their first target illumination was on 28 April 1942, but that night the satellite aircraft were not in position. Two days later Flt/Lt. C.V. Winn illuminated a He 111 which fell victim to S/Ldr. Yapp of 253 sqn. Three more contacts were made in May 1942, but all proved friendly. In July by now S/Ldr. C.V. Winn scored a probable Do 217 and P/O J.A. Gunn another Do 217 damaged. A further aircraft was claimed as damaged in August, giving a total of one destroyed, one probable and two damaged.

The flight was replaced with 538 Squadron on 2 September 1942 but officially disbanded as late as 25 January 1943. 538 Sqn, which had taken over men and machines, carried on flying the Turbinlite Bostons and Havocs till the system was abandoned on 25 January 1943, when Turbinlite squadrons were, due to lack of success on their part and the rapid development of AI radar, thought to be superfluous.

== Aircraft operated ==
Aircraft operated by no. 1459 Flight RAF, data from
From	To	Aircraft	Version
20 September 1941	2 September 1942	Douglas Havoc	Mk.I
20 September 1941	2 September 1942	Douglas Havoc	Mk.I (Turbinlite)
20 September 1941	2 September 1942	Douglas Havoc	Mk.II
20 September 1941	2 September 1942	Douglas Havoc	Mk.II (Turbinlite)
20 September 1941	2 September 1942	Douglas Boston	Mk.II (Turbinlite)
20 September 1941	2 September 1942	Douglas Boston	Mk.III
20 September 1941	2 September 1942	Douglas Boston	Mk.III (Turbinlite)

== Flight bases ==
Bases and airfields used by no. 1459 Flight RAF, data from
From	To	Base
20 September 1941	21 September 1941	RAF Hunsdon, Hertfordshire
21 September 1941	2 September 1942	RAF Hibaldstow, Lincolnshire

== Commanding officers ==
Officers commanding no. 1459 Flight RAF, data from
From	To	Name
20 September 1941	March 1942	S/Ldr. J.B. Nicholson, VC
March 1942	May 1942	S/Ldr. V.R. Oats
May 1942	2 September 1942	S/Ldr. C.V. Winn, DFC
