= No. 93 Squadron RAF =

Defunct flying squadron of the Royal Air Force

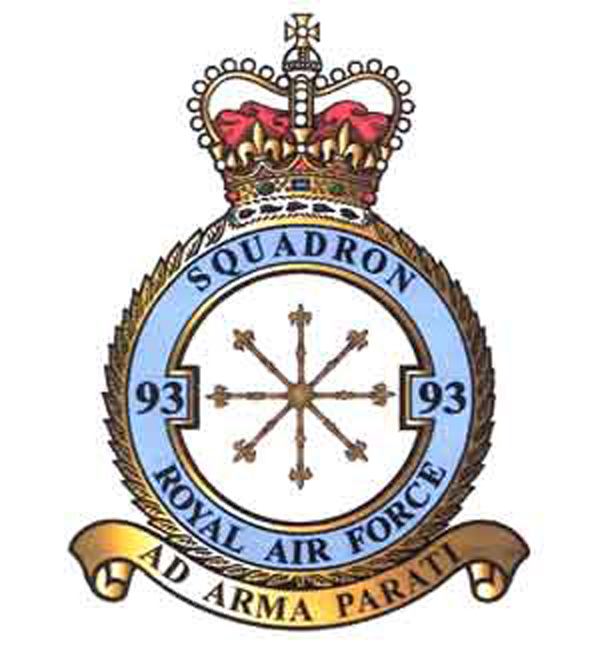
- Badge of No. 93 Squadron RAF
- Active: 1 Sep 1917 – 17 Aug 1918; 14 Oct 1918 – 21 Nov 1918; 7 Dec 1940 – 5 Sep 1945; 1 Jan 1946 – 30 Dec 1946; 15 Nov 1950 – 31 Dec 1960
- Country: United Kingdom
- Branch: Royal Air Force
- Mottos: Latin: Ad arma parati; ("Ready for battle")

Insignia
- Squadron Badge heraldry: An escarbuncle
- Squadron Roundel

No. 93 Squadron RAF was an aircraft squadron of the Royal Air Force during World War II. It was initially formed during World War I on 1 September 1917 but it did not become operational and was disbanded one year later in August 1918. The unit was reformed in October of the same year to be equipped with Sopwith Dolphins but was again disbanded only a month later.

No. 93 Squadron was then reformed on 7 December 1940 and operated Turbinlite-equipped Bostons from RAF Burtonwood, making night attacks and towing aerial mine charges with steel cables.

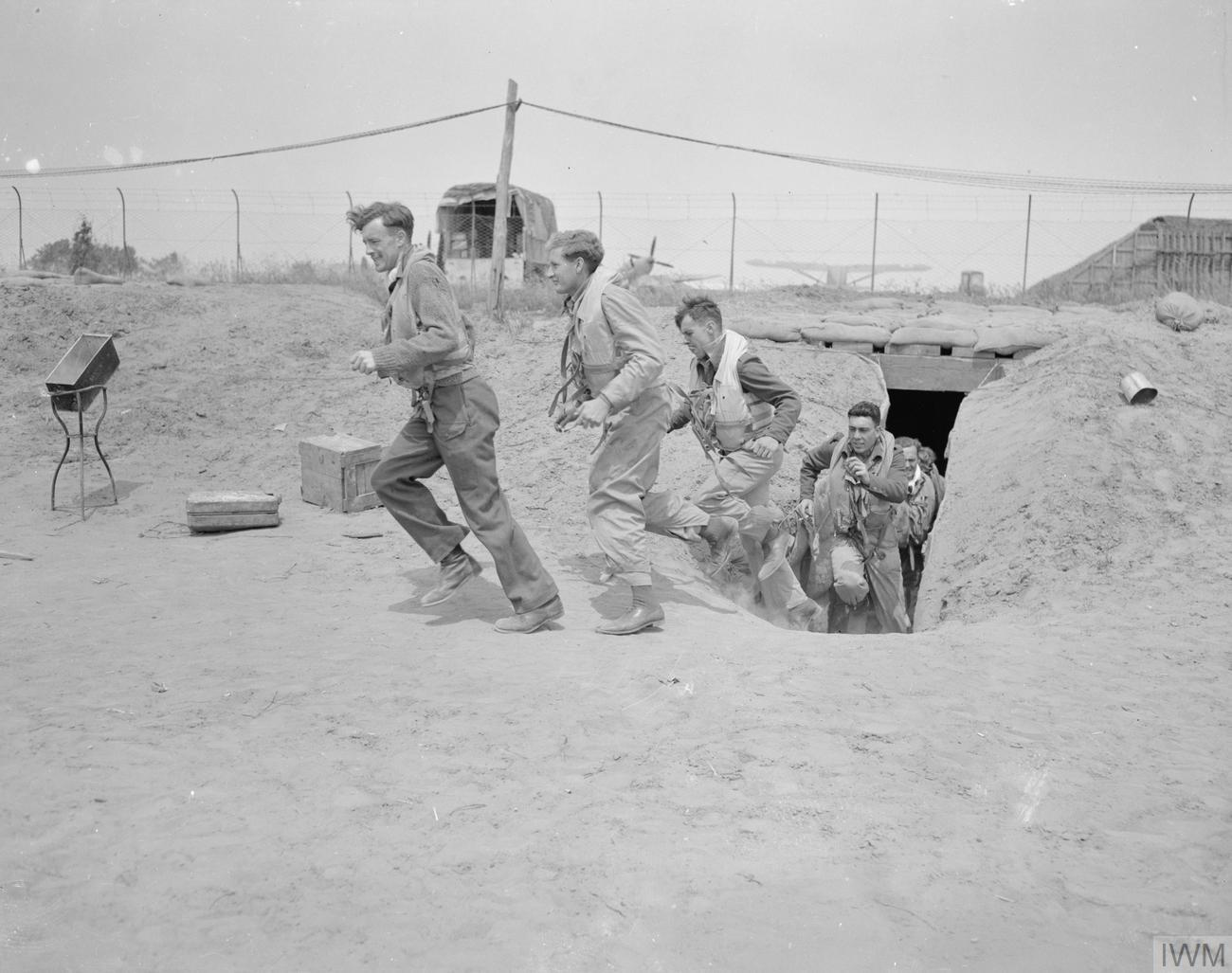
World War II: Pilots of No. 93 Squadron scramble to their aircraft

After 93 Squadron became operational, it was decided to split the squadron into flights attached to other night fighter units. Following this, 93 Squadron reformed at RAF Andreas, Isle of Man, as an entirely new squadron equipped with Spitfires as it worked up to operational efficiency. After four months at Andreas, 93 Squadron was ready to move on to more direct action. After a brief stay at RAF Kings Cliffe orders were received which would see the squadron re-locate to Algiers ready for the North African landings as part of Operation Torch.

After World War II, No. 93 Squadron was disbanded on 5 September 1945, but on 1 January 1946 237 (Rhodesia) Squadron was renumbered No. 93, so the unit became active again until 30 December 1946. During this time, North American P-51 Mustangs were flown.

It was reformed on 15 November 1950 at RAF Celle, Germany flying De Havilland Vampire fighter-bombers. The squadron was reformed again in 1952 and operated from RAF Jever in Germany flying Vampires, North American F-86 Sabres and Hawker Hunters before being disbanded in 1960.
