= Turbinlite =

British searchlight mounted on a fighter plane

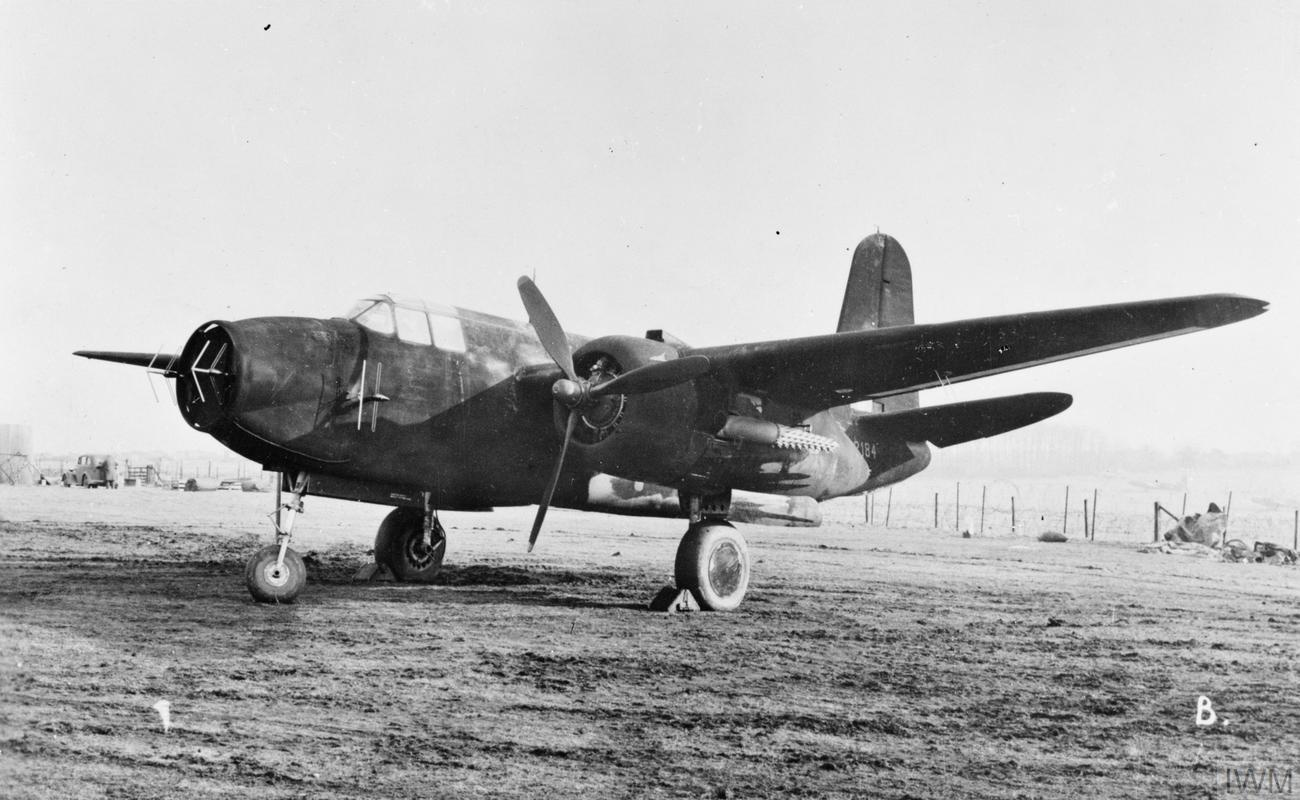
Douglas (Turbinlite) Havoc NF.II (Z2184), at the A&AEE, Boscombe Down

The Helmore/GEC Turbinlite was a 2,700 million candela (2.7 Gcd) searchlight fitted in the nose of a number of British Douglas Havoc night fighters during the early part of the Second World War and around the time of The Blitz. The Havoc was guided to enemy aircraft by ground radar and its own radar. The searchlight would then be used to illuminate attacking enemy bombers for defending fighters accompanying the Havoc to shoot down. In practice the Turbinlite was not a success, and the introduction of higher performance night fighters with their own radar meant they were withdrawn from service in early 1943.

== Background ==
The then-state-of-the-art metre-wavelength aircraft interception (AI) radar was bulky and, due to the operator workload, generally unsuited to carriage by single-engined fighters — and so required a twin-engine design. However, the early radar-equipped Bristol Blenheims lacked the necessary speed advantage over the German Heinkel He 111s and Dornier Do 17 bombers then raiding the UK to be truly effective. The Blenheims could find the bombers but were often not fast enough to shoot them down. Non-radar-equipped single-engined fighters, whilst being fast enough to catch the bombers, simply could not find them. In addition, there was some doubt as to the best way to find, intercept and shoot down attacking bombers at night. The idea was put forward that an aircraft that carried a searchlight, as well as AI radar, could light up the attacking bombers after locating them for accompanying fighters to shoot them down, the single-engine fighters having a considerable performance advantage over the German twin-engine bombers.

== Development ==
In September 1940, Sidney Cotton pursued the idea of an airborne searchlight for night-fighters, that he termed "aerial target illumination" (ATI). He enlisted the help of William Helmore, and they jointly took out patents on the techniques (Note: GB574970 and GB575093). Helmore, a serving RAF officer, then sponsored the development of what became known as Turbinlite.

At around this time the Bostons converted to night duties (and known as Havoc) then entering limited service as nightfighters and intruders offered an alternative to the Blenheim, also having a considerable performance advantage, and it was decided to conduct experiments with these. The Havoc nightfighter was already fitted with aircraft interception radar.

The searchlight, developed and built by GEC, was fitted into the nose of the Havoc behind a flat transparent screen with power for the light coming from heavy lead-acid batteries in the Havoc's bomb bay. Battery power for the 135 kW and 1,200 Amp searchlight was sufficient for about two minutes of operation. The Havoc's own armament was removed from the nose.

The radar fitted was the AI Mk.IV, with broad "arrow head" aerials protruding from the both sides of the aircraft nose with additional side-mounted, and upper- and lower-wing mounted, dipoles. The modifications were carried out at Burtonwood Aircraft Repair Depot and the resulting aircraft was known as the Havoc I Turbinlite.

The unarmed Havoc Turbinlite was intended to find the enemy bomber using its radar and then use the Turbinlite to illuminate the target for the accompanying Hawker Hurricanes to find and shoot down.

== Service ==
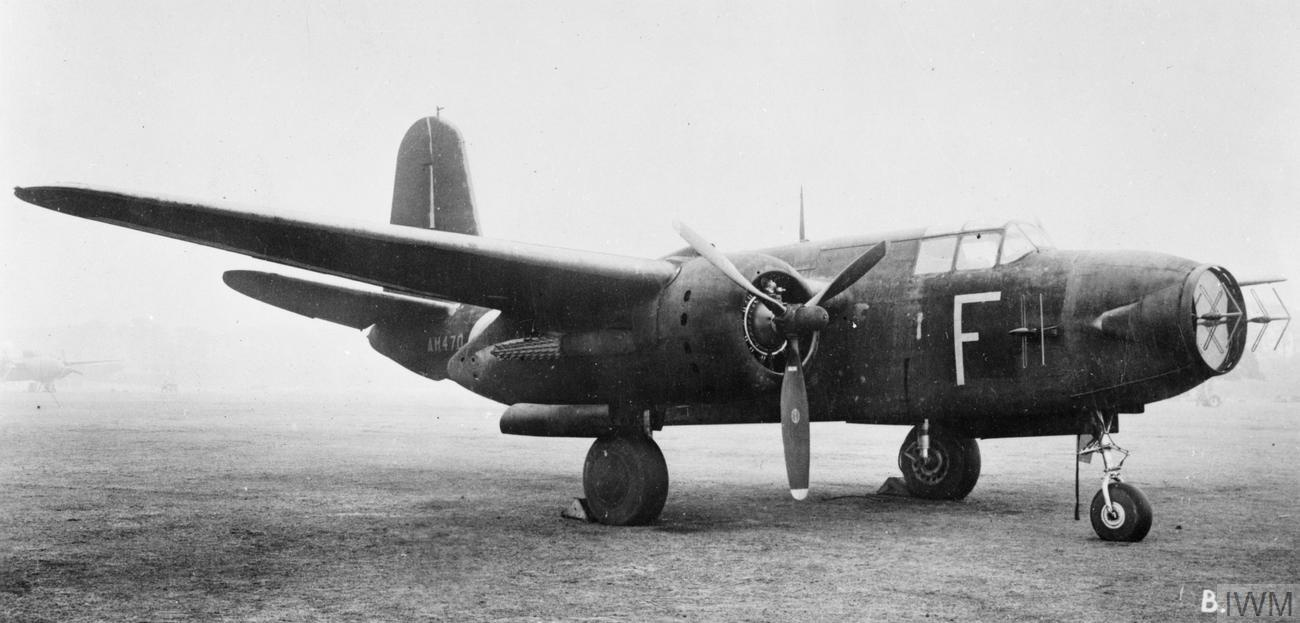
Mk.II (Turbinlite), serial AH470 "F", of No. 1459 (Fighter) Flight based at Hibaldstow, Lincolnshire

Approximately 31 Havoc I Turbinlites were so modified, using the Havoc I or Havoc L.A.M. (long aerial mine), which had themselves originally been Boston II's, before the advent of the Havoc II Turbinlite, of which a further 39 were built, this time as conversions from the Havoc II.

There was one confirmed Turbinlite intercept and shootdown of a Heinkel He 111 bomber on the night of 30 April 1942, by a 253 Squadron Hurricane and a 1459 Flight Havoc.

The concept behind the Turbinlite-equipped Havoc was rendered obsolete with the introduction of higher frequency centimetric radar along with suitable high-performance night fighters such as the Bristol Beaufighter and the later de Havilland Mosquito, although one of the latter, the Mosquito II, serial W4087, was itself experimentally fitted with a Turbinlite installation.

Over Germany the Luftwaffe used Wilde Sau (wild boar) with illumination provided by searchlight batteries and the fires created by British bombing.

=== Units ===
The following units are known to have used the Havoc I Turbinlite and Havoc II Turbinlite operationally:

In September 1942 the numbered flights were incorporated with their own fighter aircraft into new squadrons

Unit	Operational
No. 1451 (Fighter) Flight RAF; No. 530 Squadron RAF	22 May 1941 to 8 September 1942; 8 September 1942 to 25 January 1943
No. 1452 (Fighter) Flight RAF; No. 531 Squadron RAF	7 July 1941 to 8 September 1942
No. 1453 (Fighter) Flight RAF; No. 532 Squadron RAF	10 July 1941 to 8 September 1942
No. 1454 (Fighter) Flight RAF; No. 533 Squadron RAF	27 June 1941 to 8 September 1942
No. 1455 (Fighter) Flight RAF; No. 534 Squadron RAF	7 July 1941 to 2 September 1942
No. 1456 (Fighter) Flight RAF; No. 535 Squadron RAF	24 November 1941 to 2 September 1942
No. 1457 (Fighter) Flight RAF; No. 536 Squadron RAF	15 September 1941 to 8 September 1942
No. 1458 (Fighter) Flight RAF; No. 537 Squadron RAF	6 December 1941 to 8 September 1942
No. 1459 (Fighter) Flight RAF; No. 538 Squadron RAF	20 September 1941 to 2 September 1942
No. 1460 (Fighter) Flight RAF; No. 539 Squadron RAF	15 December 1941 to 2 September 1942

Typically during operations, 1453 Flt operated in conjunction with No. 151 Squadron RAF and No. 486 Squadron RNZAF, illuminating targets for the fighters to attack, with each flight / squadron of Turbinlite Havocs being associated with fighter squadrons in their vicinity.

== Other use ==
The Turbinlite was later considered in the search for a method of illuminating surfaced enemy U-boats at night, but was supplanted by the competing Leigh light.

== See also ==
- List of aircraft of the Royal Air Force
