= Harold White =

Harold White may refer to:

- Hal White (1919–2001), American baseball player
- Harold White (English cricketer) (1876–1965), English cricketer
- Harold White (New Zealand cricketer) (1896–1977), New Zealand cricketer
- Harold White (American football) (1894–1973), American football player
- Harold White (politician) (1883–1971), Australian politician
- Harold White (RAF officer) (1923–1990), British World War II flying ace
- Harold Albert White (1896–1970), British-born Canadian World War I flying ace
- Harold G. White (born 1965), American mechanical and aerospace engineer
- Sir Harold Leslie White (1905–1992), Parliamentary Librarian of Australia
- Harold O. White (1886–1969), American college football player and coach
- Harold R. White (1872–1943), Irish composer and music critic; composer of "Macushla"
- Harold Temple White (1881–1972), New Zealand music teacher, conductor, organist and composer

== See also ==
- Harry White (disambiguation)
