= Henry White =

Henry White may refer to:

== Politicians ==
- Henry White (died 1570) (1532–1570), MP for Reigate and Downton
- Henry White, 1st Baron Annaly (1791–1873), Irish British Army soldier and politician
- Henry White (British politician) (1890–1964), British Labour Member of Parliament for Derbyshire North East
- Henry White (Cape Treasurer General) (1813–1895), Cape Colony politician and Treasurer General
- Henry White (diplomat) (1850–1927), American diplomat who signed the Treaty of Versailles
- Henry A. White (born 1948), American educator and politician
- Henry Graham White (1880–1965), British Liberal Member of Parliament for Birkenhead East

== Others ==
- Henry White (academic) (died 1538), English academic, priest, and lawyer
- Henry White (footballer, born 1895) (1895–1972), English footballer
- Henry White (footballer, born 1905) (1905–1992), Australian rules footballer
- Henry White (photographer) (1819–1903), London lawyer and landscape photographer
- Henry White (priest, born 1833) (1833–1890), English Anglican priest and chaplain of the Royal Chapel, Savoy
- Henry White (Scottish footballer), Scottish footballer
- Henry Clay White (1848–1927), American chemist
- Henry Dalrymple White (1820–1886), British Army officer
- Henry Eli White (1876–1952), New Zealand-born architect
- Henry Fancourt White (1811–1866), Australian surveyor in South Africa
- Henry Julian White (1859–1934), biblical scholar
- Henry Kirke White (1785–1806), English poet
- Henry Luke White (1860–1927), Australian grazier and ornithologist
- Henry S. White (1844–1901), US Attorney for New Jersey, and Union Army surgeon
- Henry Seely White (1861–1943), American mathematician

== See also ==
- Enrique White, Irish-born Spanish soldier and governor
- Harry White (disambiguation)
