= Bleeding Oath EP =

EP by Bleeding Oath
- Released: 25 February 2012
- Recorded: December 2011; Black Wookie Studios; Lancing, West Sussex, England
- Genre: Progressive metal
- Length: 12:47
- Producer: Paul Winstanley

Bleeding Oath chronology
Oedipus Tyrannus (Demo) (2011)	Bleeding Oath EP (2012)	Fan Pack (2013)

Professional ratings
Review scores
Source	Rating
Sputnikmusic	4.5/5 stars
Cack Blabbath	(Positive)
Your Metal	(Positive)
Metality	8/10 stars

Bleeding Oath is the eponymous debut EP from English progressive metal band Bleeding Oath, released independently on February 25, 2012 in both physical and digital format. The band had begun recording the EP shortly before being named Terrorizer's Unsigned Band of 2011. The first track, "Mountains", was premiered on the Metal Hammer Podcast hosted by Stephen Hill and Merlin Alderslade, with "What Fortune Gives" (a track that had previously appeared on the Ghosts of the Past demo) being streamed by Terrorizer. The EP has received positive feedback from critics, including Metal Hammer writer Dom Lawson. The track "Mountains" featured on Terrorizer's Fear Candy 106 CD, which came free with the May 2012 issue of the magazine.

== Track listing ==
No.	Title	Length
1.	"Mountains"	6:02
2.	"What Fortune Gives"	6:45
Total length:		12:47

== Personnel ==
- Robin Haigh - vocals, guitar
- Micah Douglas - guitar
- Harrison White - drums
- Matt "Moat" Lowe - bass guitar
