= Michael Allen (air navigator) =

British air navigator (1923–2001)

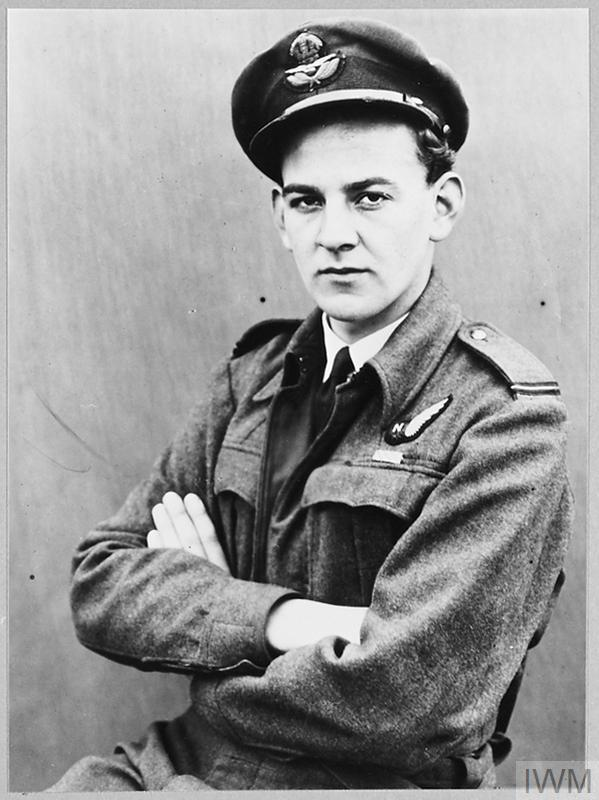
- Born: 15 March 1923; Croydon, England
- Died: 6 June 2001 (aged 78); Plymouth, England
- Military career
- Allegiance: United Kingdom
- Branch: Royal Air Force
- Service years: 1941–1946
- Rank: Flight Lieutenant
- Conflicts: Second World War
- Awards: Distinguished Flying Cross & Two Bars

Michael Seamer Allen DFC & Two Bars (15 March 1923 – 6 June 2001) was a British air navigator and radar operator of the Royal Air Force. During World War II, he participated alongside pilot Harold (Harry) Edward White in night fighter missions, for which he received the Distinguished Flying Cross, accompanied by two Bars. In 1999, he published Pursuit Through Darkened Skies: An Ace Night-fighter Crew in World War II.

== Early life ==
Michael Seamer Allen was born on 15 March 1923 in Croydon, Surrey. He attended Hurstpierpoint College and studied mechanical engineering. After graduating, he joined Fairey Aviation Company as an apprentice. In 1939, he attempted to enlist in the Royal Air Force, but his employer did not wish to lose him, claiming that he was indispensable. His father, also working in the aeronautical field, persuaded Fairey to let his son enlist. (Note: Michael Allen's parents died in a V2 bombing in July 1944.) Allen finally joined the Royal Air Force in June 1941.

== Second World War ==
Michael became an air navigator. After two months, he became teammate of Pilot Officer Harold White at No. 54 Operational Training Unit RAF at RAF Church Fenton. They were trained in night operations and remained teammates until May 1945. The RAF tended not to change crews, as night missions required extensive coordination between the pilot and the navigator. Michael was trained in the use of aircraft interception radar, freshly introduced into aviation. (The radar allowed the pilot, once in the designated area, to capture the position of enemy aircraft.)

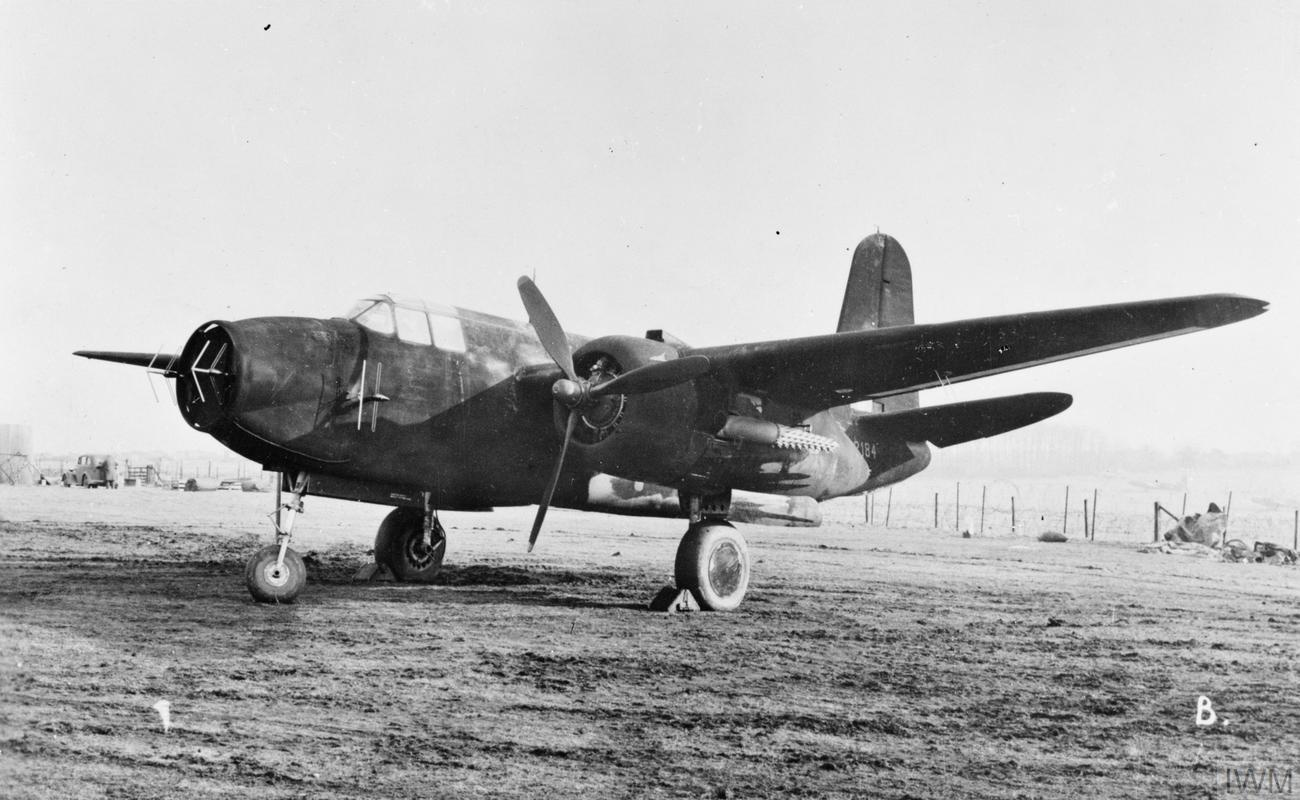
Douglas A-20G Havoc night fighter with which Allen and White began their operational career. It is equipped with radar and a turbinlite.

After training, the two men were integrated into No. 29 Squadron RAF, before being transferred to No. 534 Squadron, where they flew a Douglas A-20 Havoc. These aircraft were equipped with a Turbinlite, a powerful searchlight that lit up an enemy target, with a Hawker Hurricane fighter taking over to shoot it down. This technique was not effective, however, but allowed Allen and White to train and gain experience on night flying and interception.

Commissioned as a pilot officer on 17 April 1942, Allen was promoted to flying officer six months later. After fifteen months on a Douglas A-20G Havoc, he was transferred with White and they flew replacement Beaufighters to the Middle East. They finally joined No. 141 Squadron in 1943. At that time, Bomber Command now sent night fighters on intruder missions to seek out Luftwaffe night fighters over Germany.

Their first air victory came on the night of 3–4 July 1943 when they shot down a Messerschmitt Bf 110 heavy fighter above Aachen. However, they could not confirm the destruction of the enemy aircraft and it was deemed to have been damaged. Two weeks later, they destroyed another Bf 110 to the southeast of Reims and two Junkers Ju 88 medium bombers in August and September. On the night of 17 August, they took part, on the side of 596 bombers, in Operation Hydra, which was intended to destroy the Peenemünde facilities.

In acknowledgement of their various successes, they both received a Distinguished Flying Cross (DFC), White in September and Allen in November 1943: "As an observer, Flying Officer Allen made a very large number of night sorties and contributed to the destruction of 3 enemy aircraft. This officer has shown exceptional ardour, skill and determination". Along with Harry White, they are nicknamed "The Old Firm" because of the duo's longevity, when they're barely twenty years old.

During the winter, the squadron was re-equipped with de Havilland Mosquitos and Allen and White shot down their first target, a Bf 110, in late January 1944. In the following months, the duo shot down six other night hunters. They received a first bar for their DFCs on 14 April 1944.

They achieved their last air victory on the night of 28–29 July, shooting down two Ju 88s. They destroyed twelve aircraft in total, and also damaged four others. They received a second bar to their DFCs on 13 October 1944.

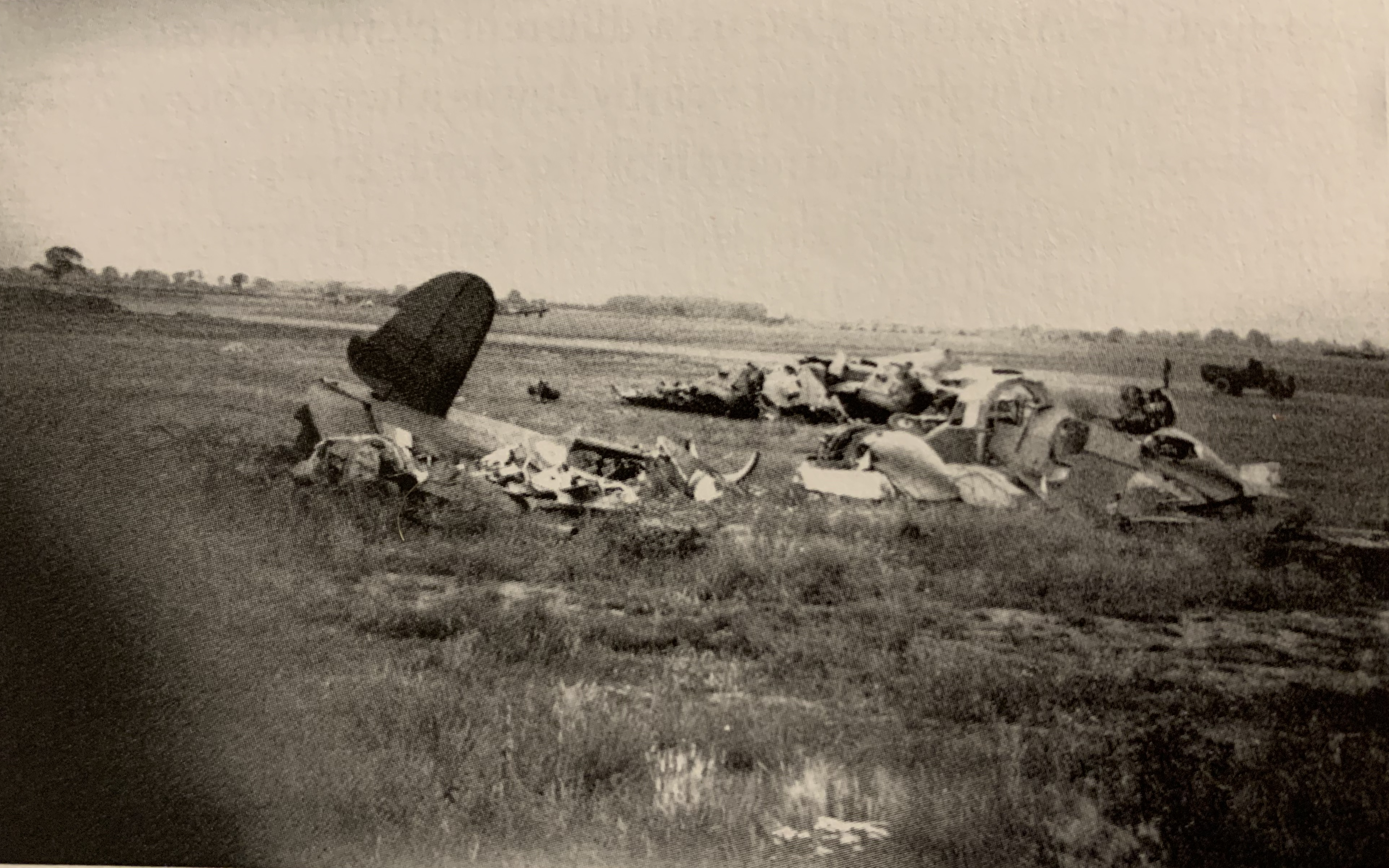
Rest of the Mosquito after the accident on takeoff in January 1945.

They were transferred to the Bomber Support Development Unit in Foulsham at the end of year. In January 1945, on their 91st sortie, the port engine of their Mosquito failed on takeoff. The engine caught fire and they made a crash landing in a field, with the aircraft disintegrating on hitting the ground. The two men survived the crash, but one of Allen's legs was trapped and White was trapped under him after being thrown forward under the AI station. Three farmers arrived at the scene of the accident and managed to free them even as the plane burned and ammunition was exploding. The three farmers were awarded the British Empire Medal for their bravery.

== Post-war ==
Michael Allen was demobilised in 1946. He managed the human resources of various companies, first Avro and then Pye Telecommunications, BTR and Rank Hovis. He moved to South Africa in 1966 where he was president of the Pretoria branch of the South African Air Force Association. He was subsequently made Honorary Life Vice-President of the SAAFA. He returned to England in 1982 and worked for the Officers' Association, a charity for veterans.

In 1999, he published the book Pursuit Through Darkened Skies: An Ace Night-fighter Crew in World War II, in which he recounted his military career and night flights during his military career.

Allen married Vivien Hallett in 1949 and had one daughter and two sons. They divorced in 1977. He married Pamela Miller in the same year.

He died on 6 June 2001 in Plymouth, at the age of 78.

== Notes and references ==
=== Bibliography ===
- Franks, Norman (2019). Gallantry in Action: Airmen Awarded the Distinguished Flying Cross and Two Bars 1918—1955. Casemate Publishers. ISBN 978-1-911621-80-5.
- Shores, Christopher; Williams, Clive (1994). Aces High: A Tribute to the Most Notable Fighter Pilots of the British and Commonwealth Forces in WWII. London: Grub Street. ISBN 1-8-9869-7000.
