= Bleeding Oath =

English progressive rock band

- Origin: London, England
- Genres: Progressive metal Extreme metal Progressive rock
- Years active: 2009–2013
- Members: Robin Haigh; Harrison White; Micah Douglas; Moat "Biggenstein" Lowe
- Past members: Ben Janes

Bleeding Oath was an English progressive rock band from London, formed in 2009. The lineup consisted of Robin Haigh (vocals, guitar), Micah Douglas (guitar), Moat "Literally Large" Lowe (bass) and Harrison White (drums). They gained notoriety for their large Facebook campaigns, irreverent attitude and self-deprecating humour, as evidenced by the group and its fans getting artists from various major groups, including Andrew W.K., DragonForce, Jason Aalon Butler of letlive. and Mikael Åkerfeldt of Opeth (who the band are heavily influenced by) to tell them, in jest, to "fuck off". Along with Opeth, the band cited groups such as Between the Buried and Me, Mastodon and Cynic as influences, as well as progressive metal, 20th-century classical music and jazz.

== History ==
The group formed in 2009. After a number of lineup changes the band stabilised with a lineup of Robin Haigh on vocals and guitar, Harrison White on drums, Micah Douglas on guitar and Ben Janes on bass (the latter two found on the website joinmyband.co.uk) and began recording and performing. From 2009 to 2011 the band released several demos, including Secrets of Eternity, Ghosts of the Past and Oedipus Tyrannus.

Towards the end of 2010 the first notable Facebook campaign started, the successful "Vote Oath" campaign (aided by members of the Gill & Beez page – who also successfully led a campaign for Max Raptor to play in a fan's bedroom) to get the band to open for thrash metal band Evile in the London leg of their UK tour, played at the Camden Underworld.

In 2011 the band participated in the "Road to Bloodstock" competition, a "Battle of the Bands" to gain a place in the lineup of the 2011 Bloodstock Open Air festival. Shortly before the semi-final stage, the band parted ways with bassist Ben Janes, replacing him with Moat "'Normous Bloke" Lowe. Since then the band has played numerous shows in southern and eastern England.

In December 2011, shortly after the band had begun recording of their debut EP, Terrorizer named them the "Best Unsigned Band of 2011". The band announced their intention to embark on a tour in 2012.

The trailer for their self-titled EP was released on 29 January 2012 with a release date of 25 February (although due to shipping issues, the actual release date was delayed by a few days). The trailer features members of bands such as Xerath and Haken, among others, telling Bleeding Oath to "fuck off" as well as Åkerfeldt and Katatonia. The first 50 pre-orders of the EP were numbered and had their own "custom rude word" added. 50 T-shirts with "FUCK OFF BLEEDING OATH" written on the back were also released to coincide with the EP. On 24 February, the Metal Hammer Podcast presented by Stephen Hill and Merlin Alderslade premièred a new Bleeding Oath track, "Mountains", to a positive reception from listeners, while Terrorizer Magazine streamed the song "What Fortune Gives". Upon release, the EP received positive feedback, with many praising Moat Lowe's bass playing and the quality of the production, including reviewers at Sputnikmusic. In April 2012, the song "Mountains" from the debut EP was featured on Terrorizer magazine's "Fear Candy" CD. The band again entered Band Quest, reaching the finals at the Camden Underworld.

Bleeding Oath was part of a very successful gig on Sunday 1 July 2012 supporting London Progressive band Haken; the feedback from the band and fans was very positive. Due to the band Crisis entering hiatus, Bleeding Oath were announced as support for Tradjectory's UK tour in September, for Bleeding Oath's first tour. Drummer Harrison White played with Tradjectory during the tour due to the departure of Fergus Gardiner, joining the group permanently in November (although he left shortly afterwards).In February 2013 the band decided to break up, citing musical differences and diverging career paths as the reason for the split. A "Fan Pack" compilation was released by the band on 8 February 2013, including a number of previously unreleased demos (including live staple "Oceans") as well as tablatures and photographs.

== New projects ==
Directly after the split was announced, Moat and Harrison stated that they had formed a new band, Novena, which will release the 32-minute EP that had been written shortly before Bleeding Oath's split. Moat also plays bass for the band No Sin Evades His Gaze, which features ex-Ravenface vocalist James Denton. Robin Haigh is a composer of contemporary classical music.

== Members ==
- Robin Haigh – vocals, guitar (2009–2013)
- Micah Douglas – guitar (2009–2013)
- Harrison White – drums (2009–2013)
- Moat "Sizable Creature" Lowe – bass guitar, vocals (2011–2013)
- Ben Janes – bass guitar (2009–2011)

== Discography ==
=== Demos ===
- Secrets of Eternity (2009)
- Ghosts of the Past (2010)
- Oedipus Tyrannus (2011)

=== Extended plays ===
Year	EP details
2012	Bleeding Oath: Released: 25 February 2012; Label: Self-released; Format: EP, Download

=== Compilations ===
- Fan Pack (2013)
