= Harrison White (disambiguation) =

Harrison White is a sociologist.

Harrison White may also refer to:

- S. Harrison White, U.S. Representative from Colorado
- Harrison White, musician in Bleeding Oath

== See also ==
- Harry White (disambiguation)
