= Harold White (RAF officer) =

British flying ace of WWII

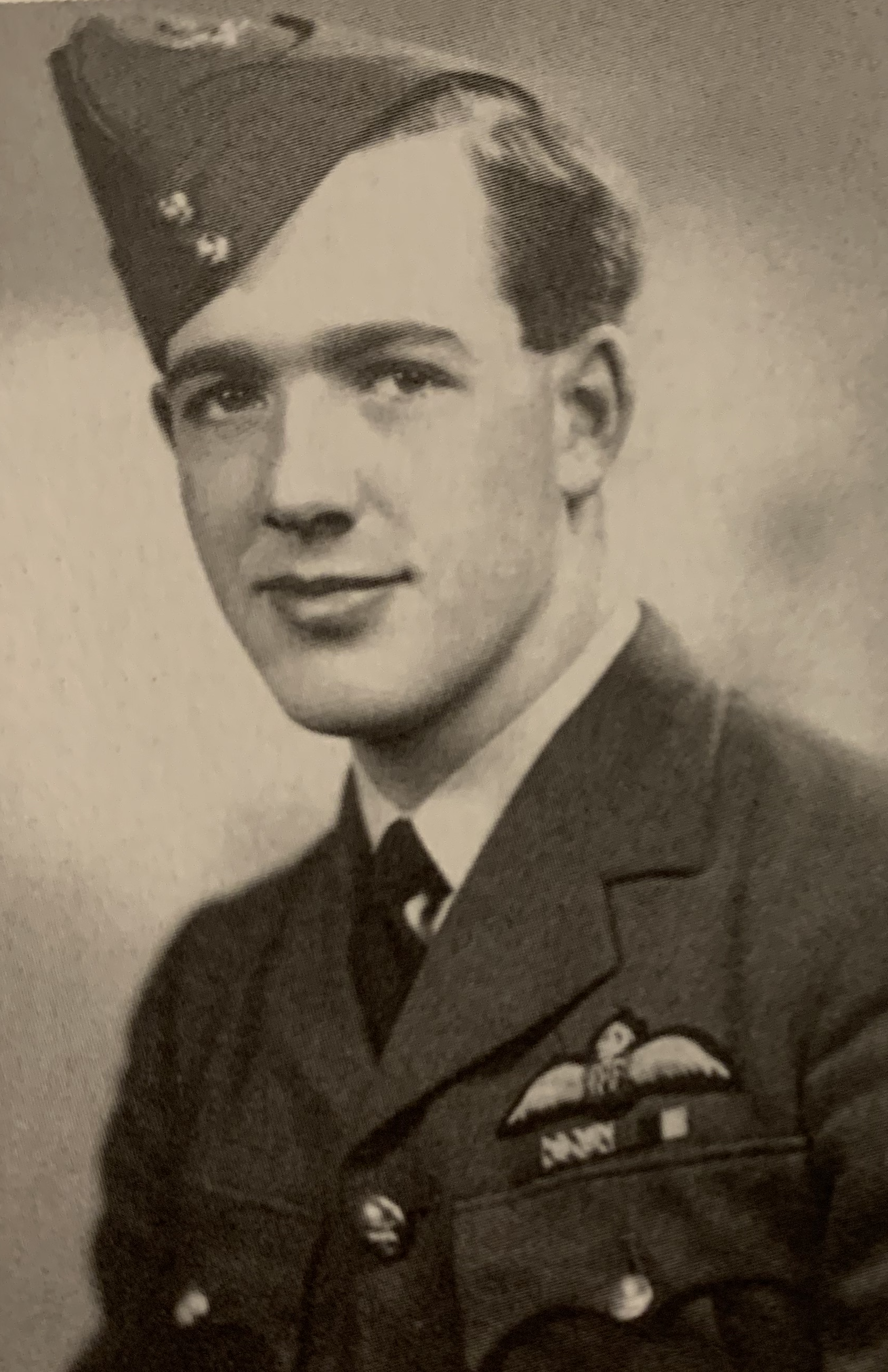
- Born: 23 May 1923
- Died: 25 March 1990 (aged 66)
- Military career
- Allegiance: United Kingdom
- Branch: Royal Air Force
- Service years: 1940–1977
- Rank: Air Commodore
- Units: No. 534 Squadron; No. 141 Squadron; Bomber Support Development Unit
- Commands: RAF Buchan; No. 46 Squadron
- Conflicts: Second World War; Cold War
- Awards: Commander of the Order of the British Empire; Distinguished Flying Cross and Two Bars; Air Force Cross
- Other work: Chief Executive Officer of the Borough of Swale

Harold White, CBE, DFC & Two Bars, AFC (23 May 1923 – 25 March 1990) was a British flying ace who served with the Royal Air Force (RAF) during the Second World War. He was credited with having shot down at least twelve aircraft.

From Woking, White joined the RAF in 1940 at the age of 17. Once his training was completed in 1942 he was posted to No. 534 Squadron, which was a night fighter unit operating Turbinlite aircraft. When the squadron was disbanded in early 1943, he was posted to No. 141 Squadron, another night fighter unit. He spent the majority of the remainder of his wartime service with the squadron, claiming several aerial victories and being awarded the Distinguished Flying Cross three times. When the war ended he and his navigator Michael Allen, who he flew with for nearly three years, were serving in the Bomber Support Development Unit.

White opted to remain in the RAF in the postwar period and, apart from periods as commander of No. 46 Squadron and the RAF station at Buchan, served mostly in several staff and training posts until his retirement from the military in late 1977. The chief executive officer for the Borough of Swale in civilian life, he died in 1990, aged 66.

== Early life ==
Harold Edward White was born on 23 May 1923 and raised in Woking, where he was educated. Wanting to serve in the Second World War, he enlisted in the Royal Air Force (RAF) in 1940, falsifying his age to do so. After progressing through his initial flying training and being promoted to sergeant, he proceeded to No. 54 Operational Training Unit (OTU) at Church Fenton. Here he was paired with Sergeant Michael Seamer Allen as his navigator and the two would go on to fly as a team for much of the remainder of the war. While at the OTU, White was involved in an aircraft accident; his Airspeed Oxford trainer collided with a Bristol Blenheim just after take off, both aircraft crashing into the ground but without injury to any of the aircrew involved.

== Second World ==
Once his training was complete, in March 1942, White commenced his active service in the Second World War; he was commissioned as a pilot officer and, with Allen, was posted to No. 534 Squadron. This was a night fighter unit based at Tangmere, which was one of a number working with Turbinlites; Douglas A-20 Havoc aircraft equipped with a searchlight in the nose, which spotted enemy aircraft that accompanying fighters would then engage. The squadron trained with Hawker Hurricane fighters of Nos. 1 and 3 Squadrons. It commenced operations in July but the use of Turbinlites was not particularly successful and the squadron was disbanded in January 1943.

=== Service with No. 141 Squadron ===
White, still paired with Allen, was posted to No. 141 Squadron. This was based at Ford, but was about to move to Predannack with its Bristol Beaufighter heavy fighters to operate on intruder sorties to German-occupied Europe. From April, it was based at Wittering, flying across to the Netherlands and northern Germany, and guided by the Serrate homing device, sought out Luftwaffe night fighters that would otherwise target the RAF's bombers on their way to Germany. On the night of 3 July, White damaged a Messerschmitt Bf 110 heavy fighter near Aachen. He destroyed a Bf 110 to the southeast of Rheims on another sortie on 15 July. This was piloted by Major Paul-Hubert Rauh, a Luftwaffe flying ace who survived the encounter and would go on to claim 31 aerial victories. He shot down a Junkers Ju 88 night fighter to the north of Lingen on 17 August, also damaging a Bf 110 near Groningen the same night; the latter had attacked White's aircraft but he was able to evade and engaged the Bf 110. On 6 September he destroyed a Ju 88 over Rheims. These successes led to White being awarded the Distinguished Flying Cross (DFC) later that month. Allen also received the DFC, but his was not announced until November. The citation for White's DFC, published in The London Gazette, read:

This officer has completed numerous sorties over enemy territory and has displayed great skill and determination throughout. In July, 1943, he shot down a Messerschmitt 110, while during another sortie in August, 1943, he engaged 3 hostile aircraft in separate combats. In the latter engagement his opponent's aircraft was seen to spiral towards the ground in flames and explode on impact.

— London Gazette, No. 36183, 24 September 1943

By October, the squadron was achieving much fewer successes and it began to convert to the de Havilland Mosquito heavy fighter. In December it was transferred to Bomber Command and joined No. 100 Group. From West Raynham it began to operate on bomber support duties while still carrying intruder missions. White, now holding the rank of flying officer, and White's next successful engagement was on the night of 27 January 1944, when he shot down a Messerschmitt Bf 109 fighter to the north of Berlin. He then destroyed a Heinkel He 177 heavy bomber in the vicinity of Berlin on the night of 15 February. A pair of Ju 88s were shot down by White near Frankfurt on 18 March. He damaged a Ju 88 near Essen on 26 March, having been promoted to flight lieutenant the same day. Then, the following month, White and Allen were awarded Bars to their DFCs; the published citation read:

As observer and pilot respectively these officers have completed many sorties since being awarded the Distinguished Flying Cross. They have set a fine example of keenness and devotion to duty throughout and have now destroyed at least 5 enemy aircraft at night. Their achievements have been worthy of much praise.

— London Gazette, No. 36468, 14 April 1944

On the night of 19 April, White destroyed a Dornier Do 217 night fighter. He shot down a Ju 88 north of Amiens on 10 May, and on the night of 26 May, destroyed a Bf 109. Two aircraft, both Ju 88s, were destroyed by White near Kall on the night of 28 July; these were his last successes of 1944 as he and Allen were transferred to the Bomber Support Development Unit later that year. A second Bar to White's DFC was announced on 13 October.

=== Bomber Support Development Unit ===
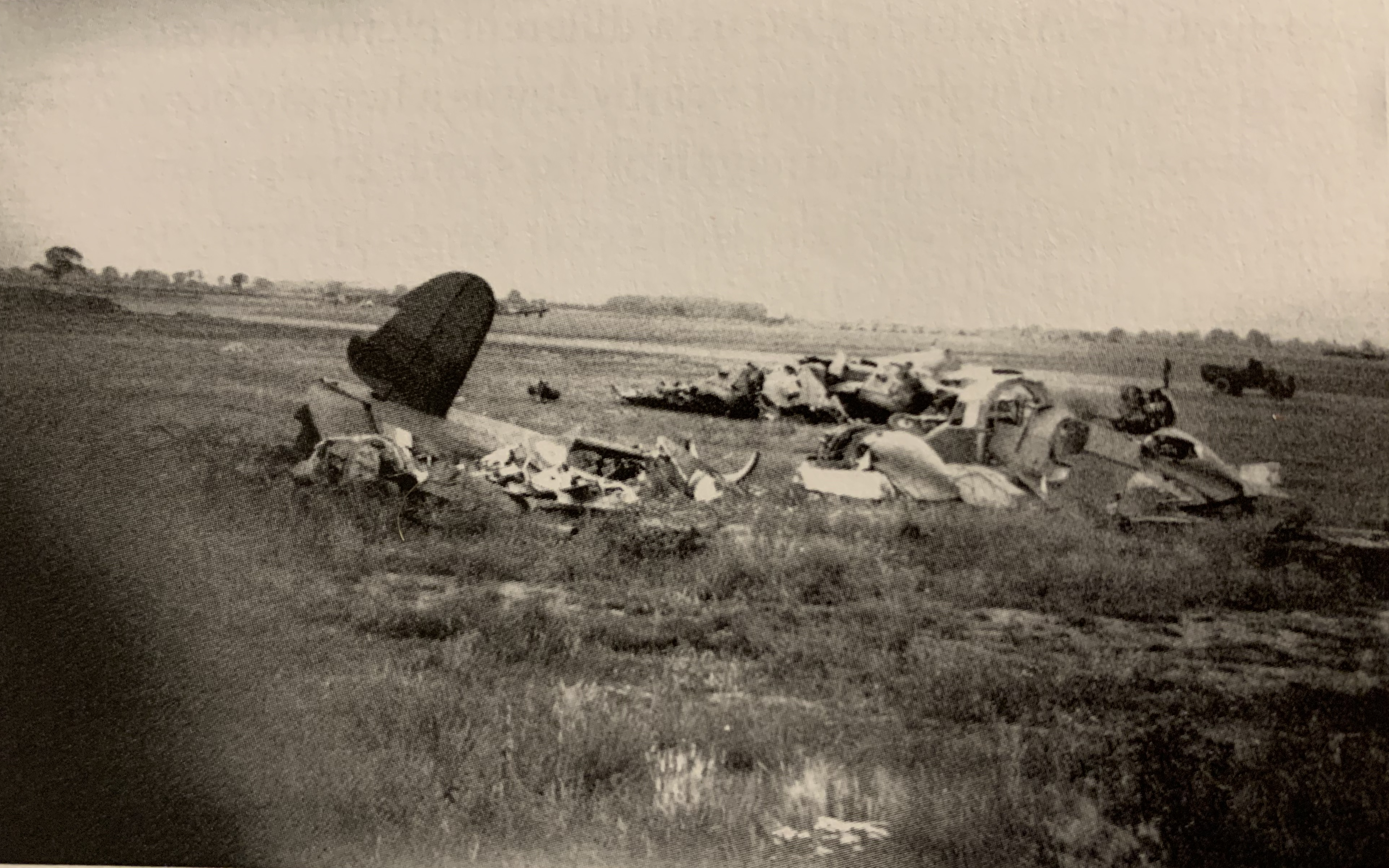
The wreckage of White's Mosquito following a crash in January 1945

On the night of 1 January 1945, White claimed a Ju 88 as damaged to the east of Dortmund. Later in the month, White and Allen's Mosquito crashed as a result of an engine failure during take off. Although the aircraft disintegrated in a nearby field on impact, both men survived and were extracted from the burning wreckage by three farm workers who had arrived at the scene of the accident. The workers were subsequently awarded the British Empire Medal for their bravery. White did not add further to his aerial victories and ended the war credited with the destruction of twelve aircraft, and damaging of four others.

== Postwar period ==
White opted to remain in the RAF in the postwar period, being granted a permanent commission as an acting flight lieutenant, but with the substantive rank of flying officer, from 1 September 1945. He carried out instructing duties, eventually becoming the chief flying instructor and, as a squadron leader, commander of the Flying Wing at Leeming in 1955. He had also been awarded the Air Force Cross and received a Queen's Commendation for Valuable Service in the Air.

In June 1956, White was appointed commander of No. 46 Squadron at Odiham and in this capacity oversaw the introduction into RAF service of the Gloster Javelin jet fighter. Promoted to wing commander in January 1957, he relinquished command of the squadron in May 1958. White went to serve in staff posts in Europe and the Far East until 1967, at which time, now holding the rank of group captain, he was appointed commander of the RAF station at Buchan. He was subsequently posted to West Germany, serving in the planning department at RAF Headquarters there before becoming responsible for administration. He retired from the RAF in November 1977 as an air commodore. In the 1978 New Year Honours, he was appointed a Commander of the Order of the British Empire.

== Later life ==
Returning to civilian life, White worked as the chief executive officer for the Borough of Swale until his retirement in 1988. He died two years later, on 25 March 1990, survived by his wife and two children.
