= Ravenface =

English metalcore band

- Origin: Blackpool, Lancashire, England
- Genres: Alternative metal, metalcore
- Years active: 2007–14, 2017–present
- Members: James Denton; Jack Ormond-Prout; Leah Woodward; Adam Dowd; Cameron Spence

Ravenface are an English heavy metal band, originating from Blackpool, Lancashire, England, formed in 2007.

== Career ==
They released their self-titled EP in 2009, which was followed by their debut studio album This Is Annihilation the following year on 30 November. The band performed at Hammerfest III on 18 March 2011 in Prestatyn, performing on the Fresh Blood Stage. Their second studio album titled Divided Kingdom was released in 2012. It featured guest vocals by Mutiny Within's Chris Clancy on the eponymous track.

In mid-2013, James Denton founded the metal band No Sin Evades His Gaze, which features ex-Bleeding Oath bassist Moat Lowe, initially as a side project. Ravenface decided to split in 2014, with both vocalist James Denton and drummer Theo Harvey now focusing on No Sin Evades His Gaze; former drummer Dom Rodriguez focusing on his band called Heritage; and guitarist Jack Ormond-Prout focusing on his band called Jagwar.

The band announced in 2017 they were reuniting, marking it with a re-release of their second studio album Divided Kingdom, the funds from which they would use to record a third studio album. The band released their third album Breathe Again in 2018.

== Musical style and influences ==
Even if the style was based more on metalcore in the beginning, the musical style is now more directed towards alternative metal. You can also find some elements of progressive metal, groove metal and heavy metal in their songs. The band have stated they are influenced by bands such as Metallica, DevilDriver, Lamb of God, Avenged Sevenfold, Linkin Park, Five Finger Death Punch, Killswitch Engage, Meshuggah, Gojira, Decapitated.

== Band members ==
Current members

- James Denton – vocals
- Jack Ormond-Prout – vocals, guitars
- Leah Woodward – guitars
- Adam Dowd – bass
- Cameron Spence – drums

Former members

- Zach Thompson – guitars
- Billy Dowdall – bass, backing vocals
- William "Rod" Collins – guitars
- Dom Rodgriguez – drums

== Discography ==
Albums

- This Is Annihilation (2010)
- Divided Kingdom (2012); Re-Release in 2017
- Breathe Again (2018)

EPs

- Ravenface (2009)
- Beneath The Tides (2013)

Singles

- Tyrants and Kings (2017)
- Fighters (2018)
- Breathe Again (2018)
