= Francis Bedford (photographer) =

English photographer (1815–1894)

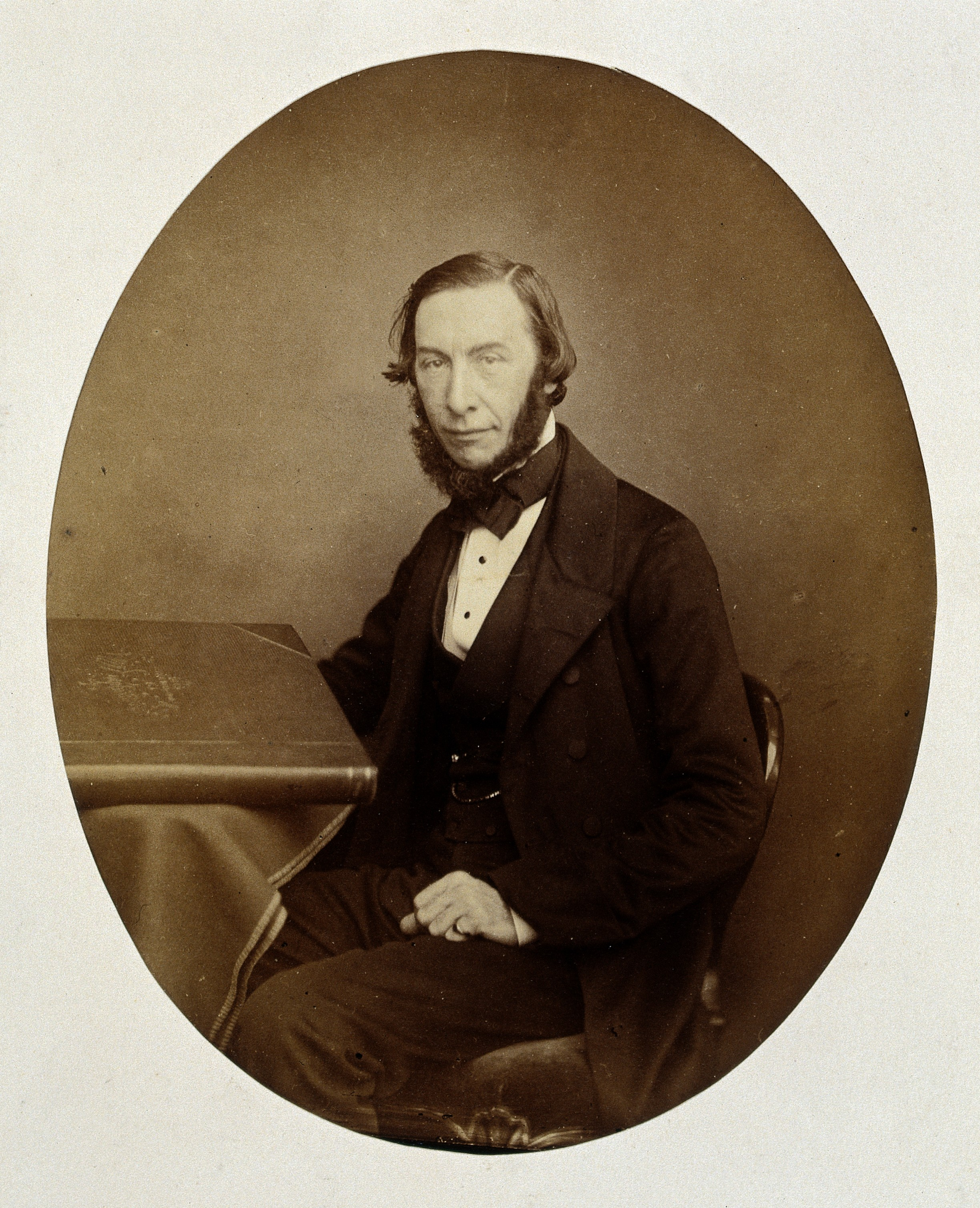
- Francis Bedford
- Born: 1815; London
- Died: 15 May 1894 (aged 78–79); London
- Resting place: Highgate Cemetery
- Occupation: Photographer
- Years active: Over 40 years
- Known for: Landscape photography

Francis Bedford (1815 in London – 15 May 1894) was one of England's most prominent landscape photographers and the first to accompany a royal tour.

== Early life ==
Bedford was the eldest son of the successful church architect Francis Octavius Bedford. He was christened at St Giles in Camberwell on 11 September 1815. He began his career as an architectural draughtsman and lithographer, before taking up photography in the early 1850s.

== Career ==
He helped to found the Royal Photographic Society in 1853. In 1854, at Marlborough House Queen Victoria commissioned him to photograph objects in the royal collection and in 1857 she commissioned him to photograph her husband Prince Albert's hometown of Coburg, Germany. There followed several more royal commissions, and his series of stereographs of England and Wales have come to be regarded as some of the finest landscape works of their time. Following the death of Prince Albert in 1861 his eldest son, Prince Albert (later King Edward VII), invited Bedford to photograph his extensive tour of Greece and the Middle East, the first royal tour to be photographically documented.

For much of his career Bedford tended towards photography as an art form, painting in clouds, enhancing fine detail with pencil or brushes, and using tissue paper to darken negatives to improve lighting, but by the late 1870s, he was an advocate of simplicity. Between 1851 and 1894 he produced nearly 9,000 wet collodion negatives and albumen prints, making him one of the most prolific landscape photographers of his time.

== Personal life ==
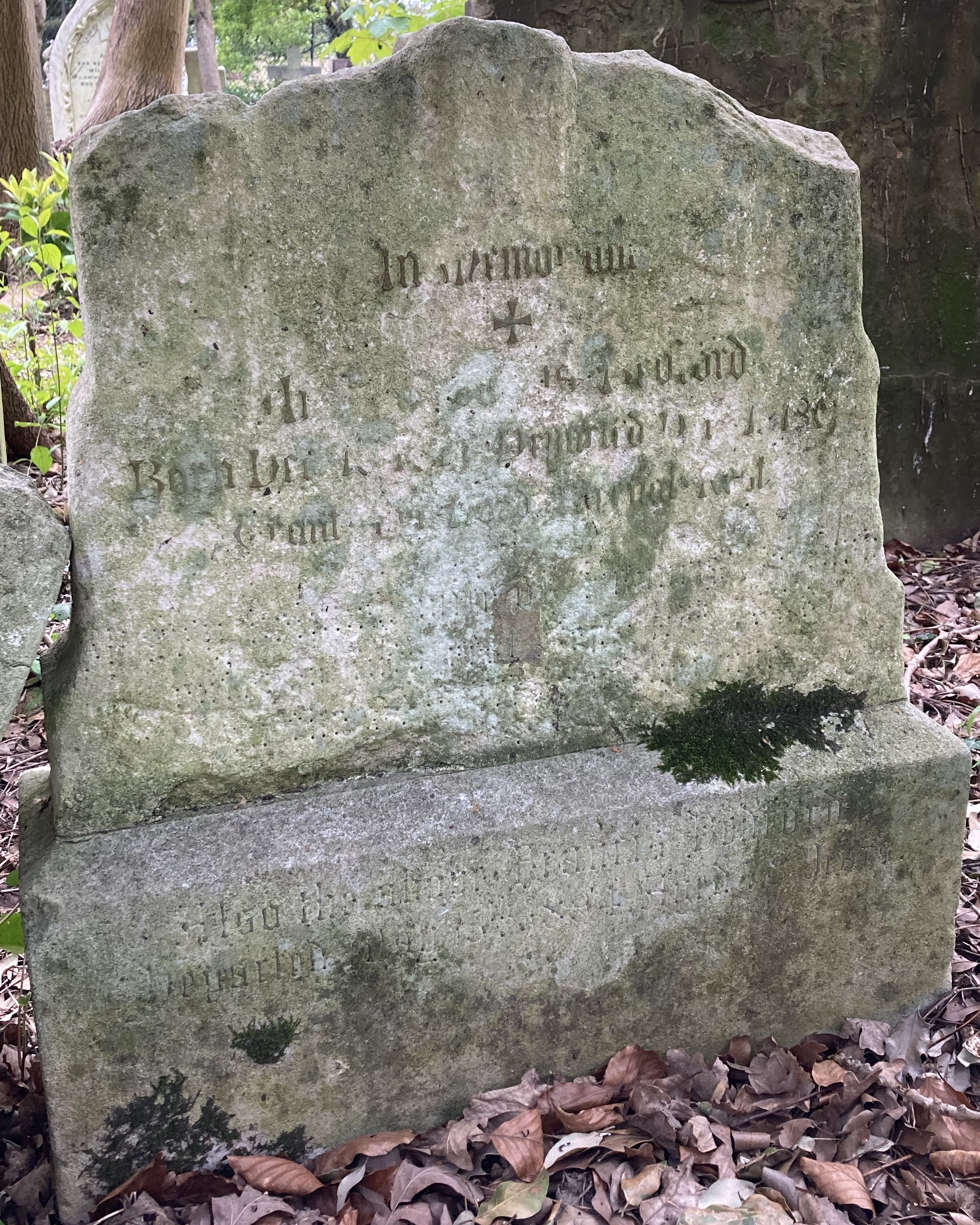
Grave of Francis Bedford in Highgate Cemetery

On 1 November 1843 he married Mary Graham at St Andrew's in Holborn, London. The couple appear on the 1851 census living at 23 Rochester Road, Kentish Town, London, with their two young sons, Arthur and William. Francis gave 'Lithographic Artist' as his profession. When the 1861 census was taken, Francis, now an 'Artist', was staying at a hotel in Peterborough. Ten years later he and Mary were living at 326 Camden Road, London. Francis now gave 'Photographic Artist' as his profession. He was still at the same address in 1881. Also present that night were his wife Mary, his son William, his daughter-in-law Wilhelmina, and his six-year-old grandson Francis.

He died on 15 May 1894 and is buried on the west side of Highgate Cemetery, close to the grave of another celebrated Victorian photographer, Henry White.

== Photography records ==
On 19 February 2009 Swann Galleries set an auction record for Bedford's work Photographic Pictures Made by Mr. Francis Bedford During the Tour in the East, a suite of three albums from 1862. The albums sold for $132,000.

The National Gallery of Art Library in Washington, D.C. holds a two-volume index of Bedford's photographs that is organized by print type.

== Collections ==
- Duke University Libraries
- National Gallery of Art, Department of Image Collections. This collection includes over 4,000 digitized photographs by Bedford.
- The Royal Collection
- Museum of Modern Art
- National Galleries of Scotland
- J. Paul Getty Museum
- Ryerson Image Centre

== Gallery ==
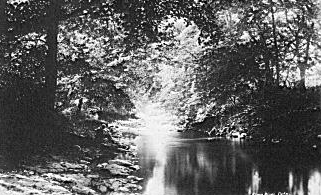
River Elwy

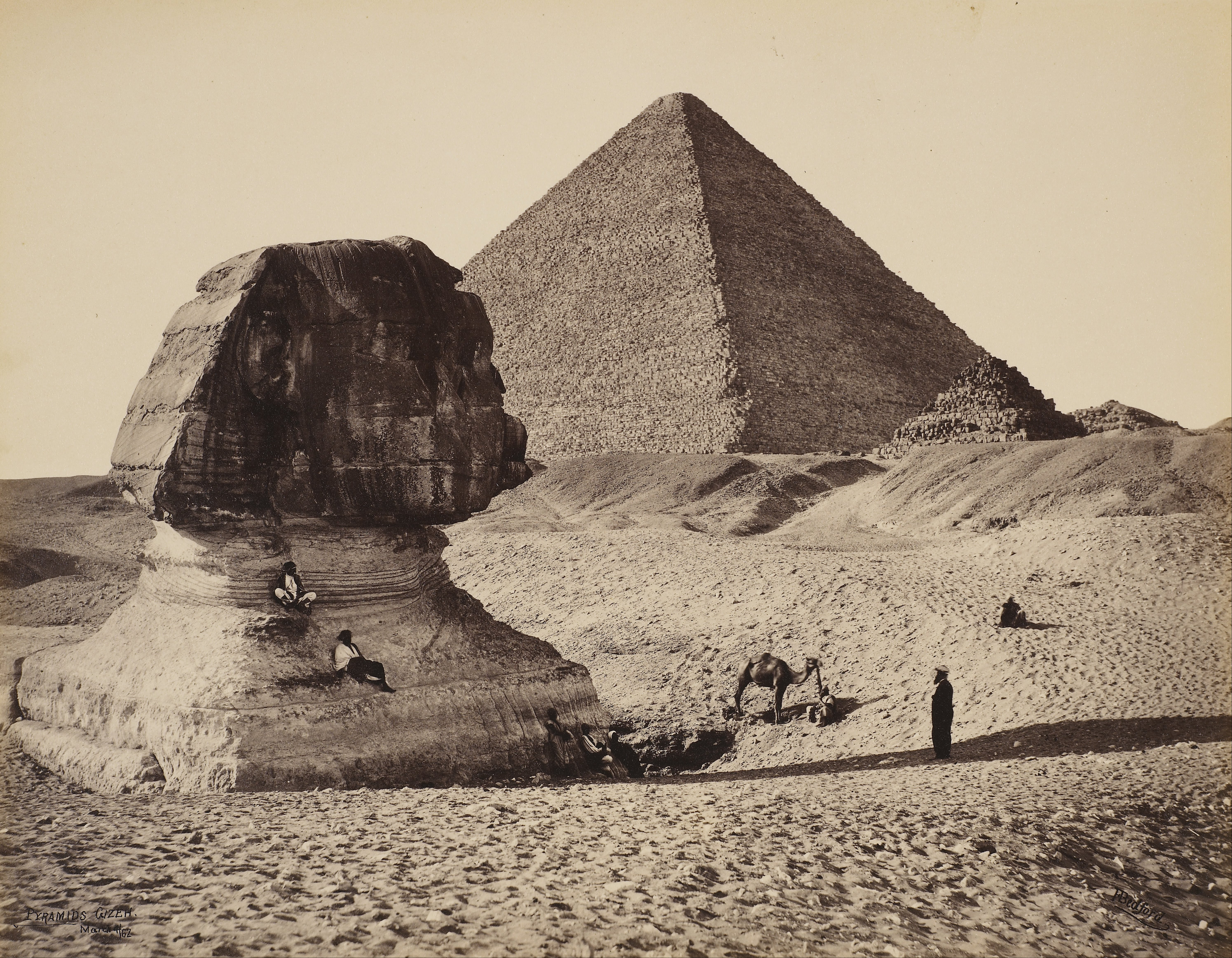
Sphinx and Egyptian pyramids

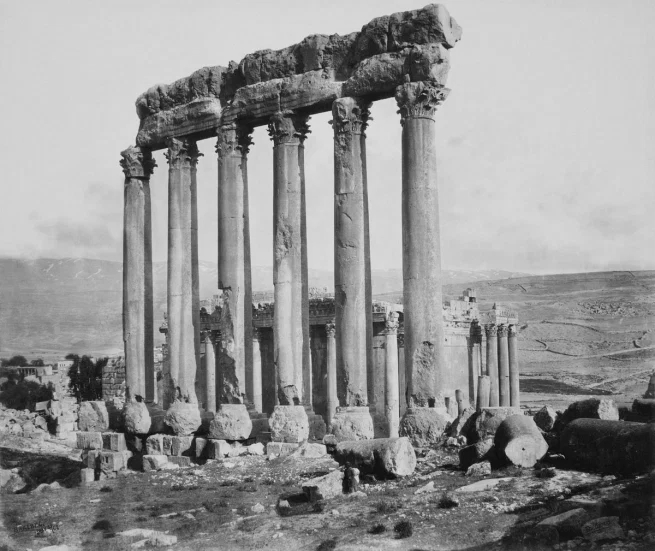
The Temple of the Sun and Temple of Jupiter, Baalbek, Lebanon 1862

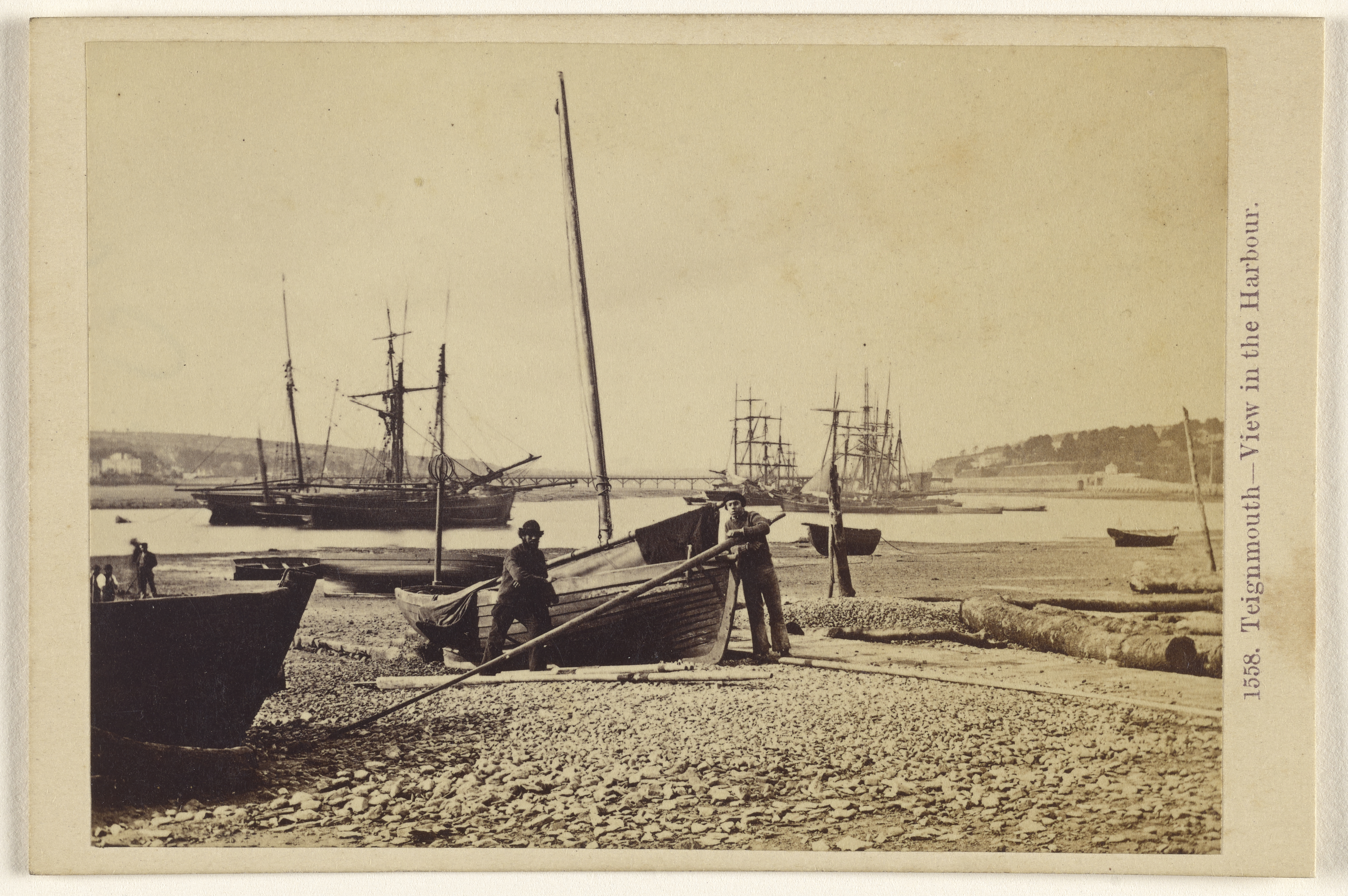
Teignmouth - View in the Harbour

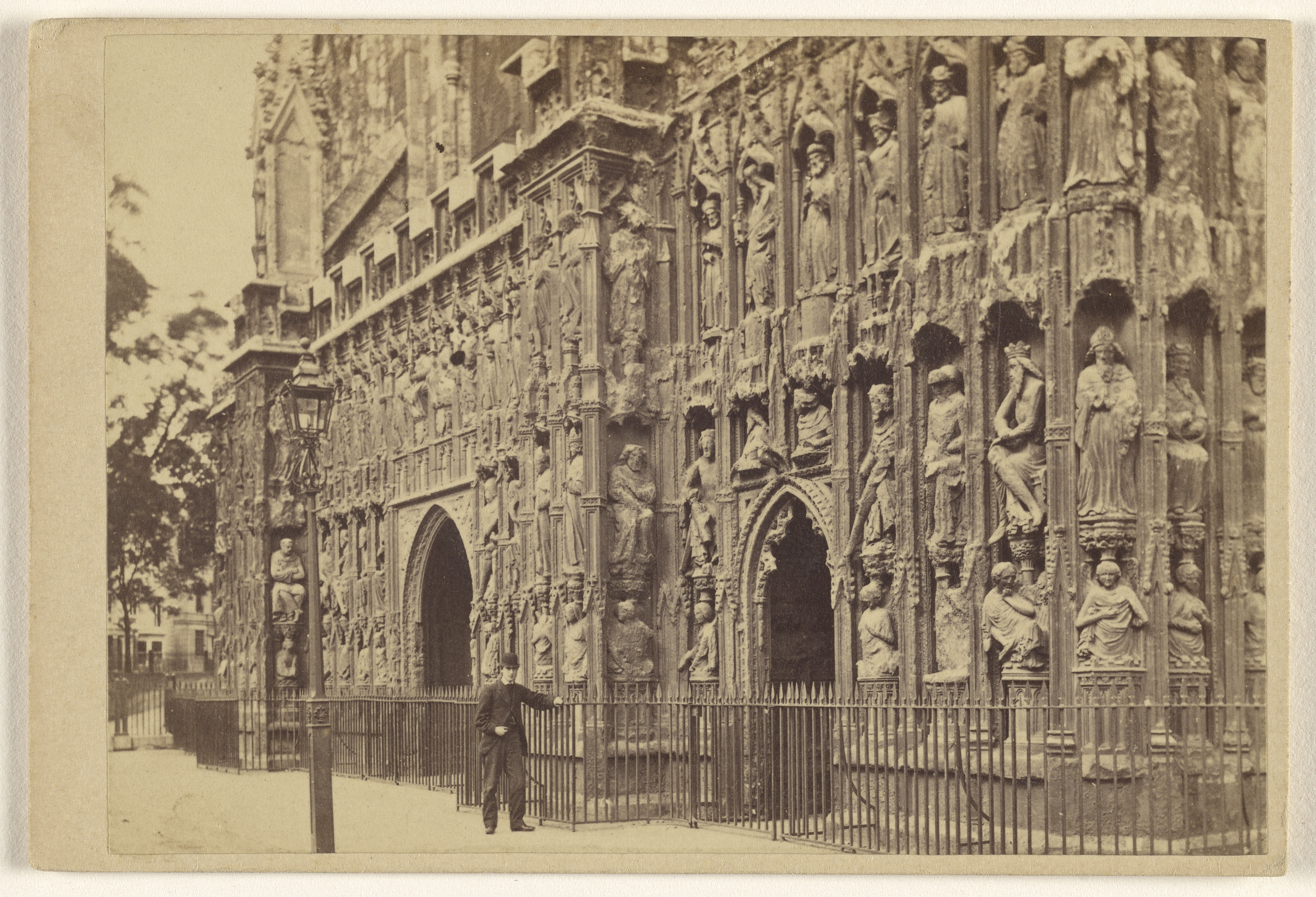
West Facade of Exeter Cathedral 1864 or 1865

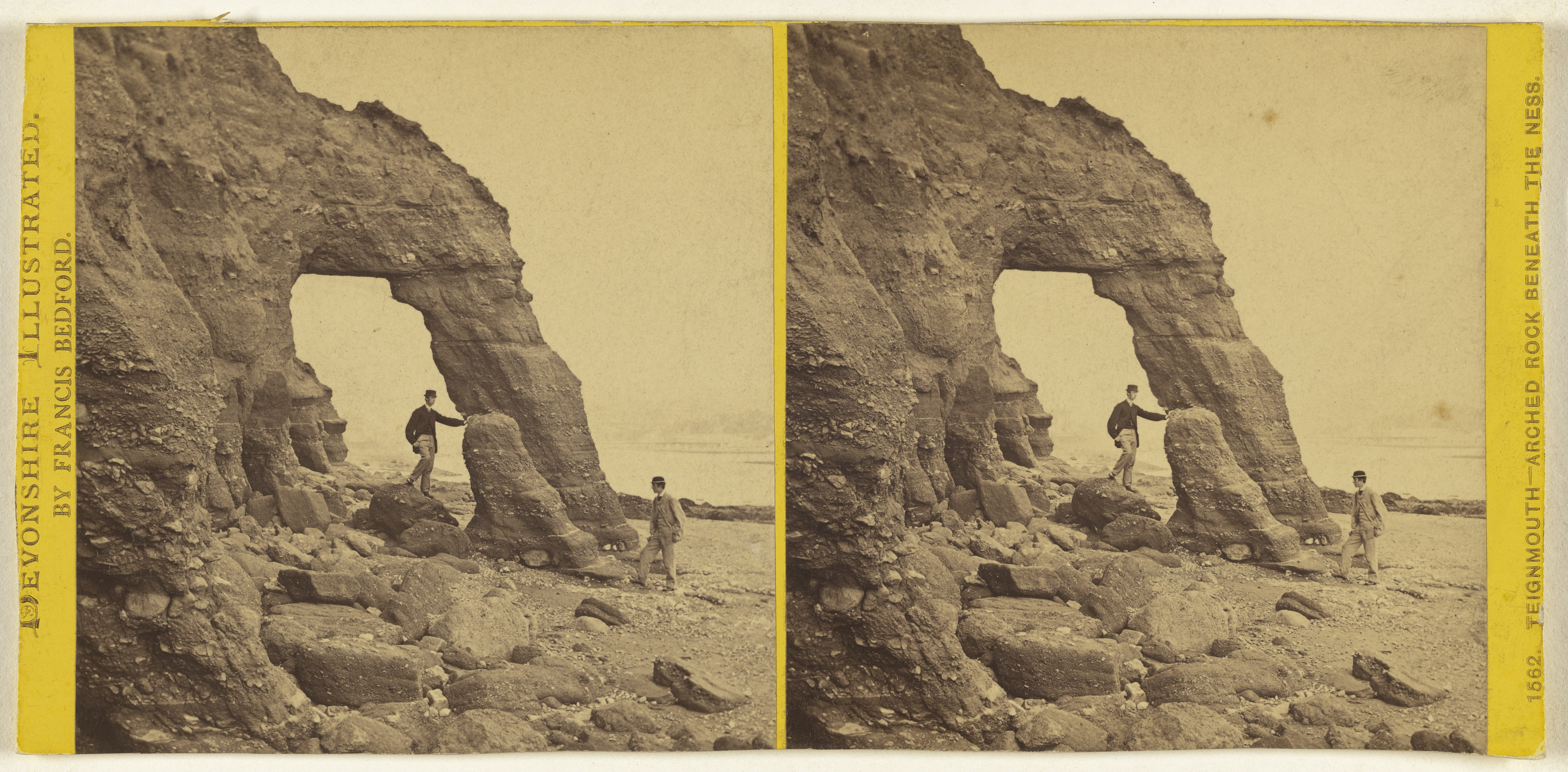
Teignmouth - Arched Rock Beneath the Ness

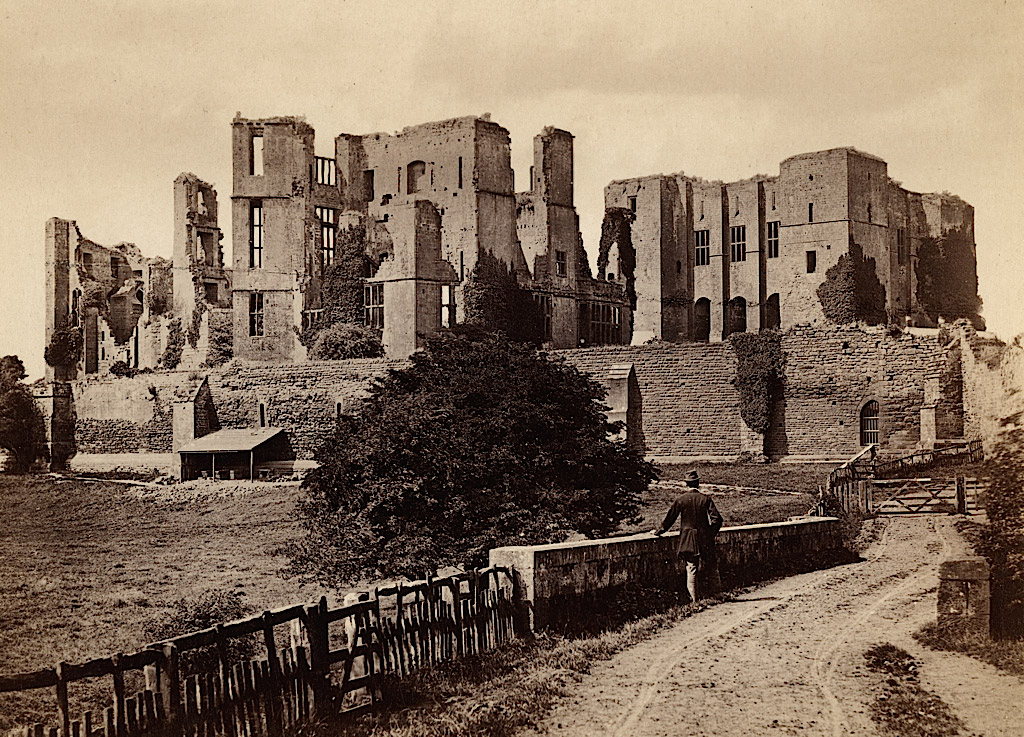
Francis Bedford, Kenilworth Castle, England, 1860s, albumen print, Department of Image Collections, National Gallery of Art Library, Washington, DC

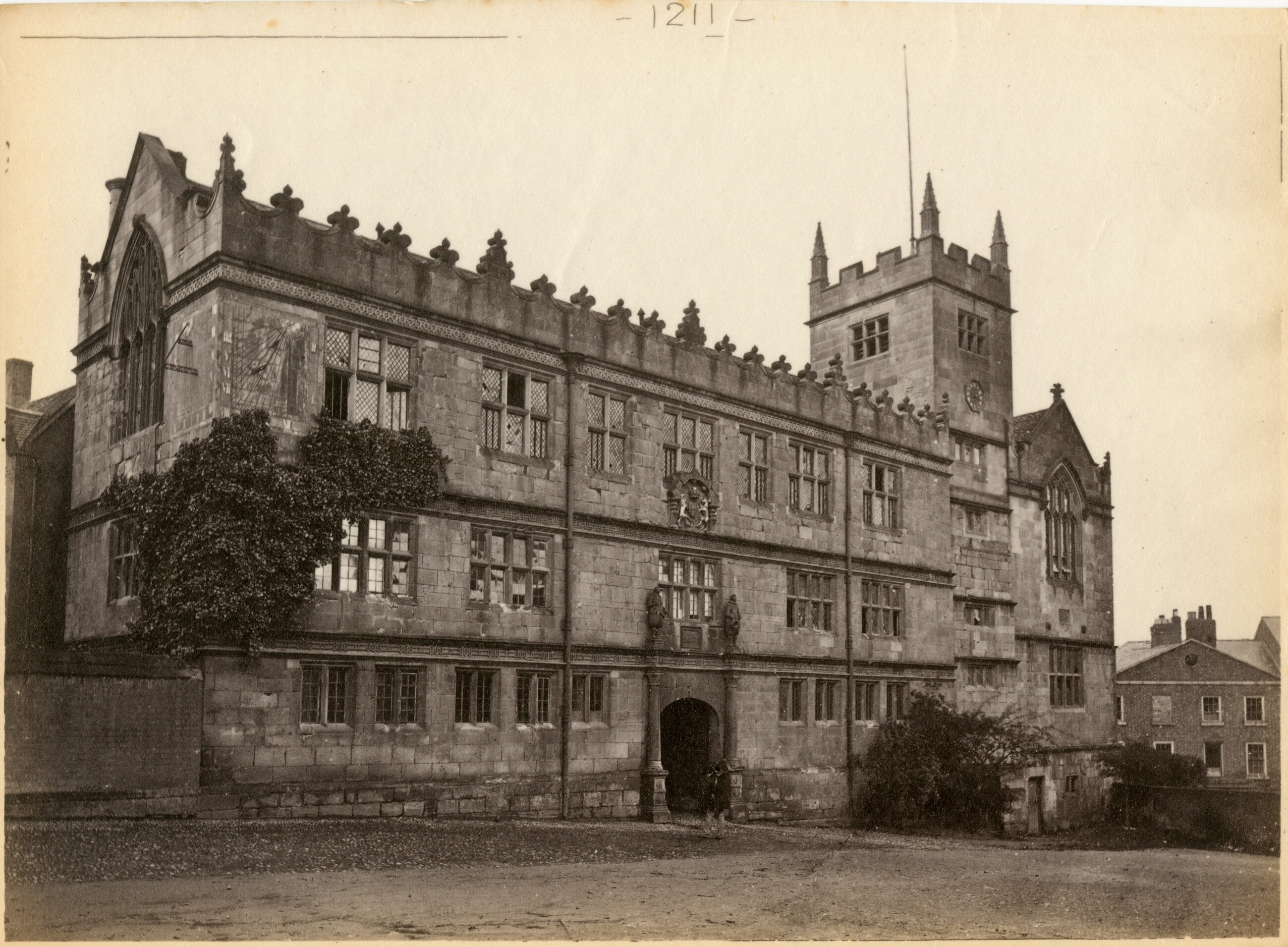
Library in Shrewsbury England by Francis Bedford, c. 1863–1884. Department of Image Collections, National Gallery of Art Library.

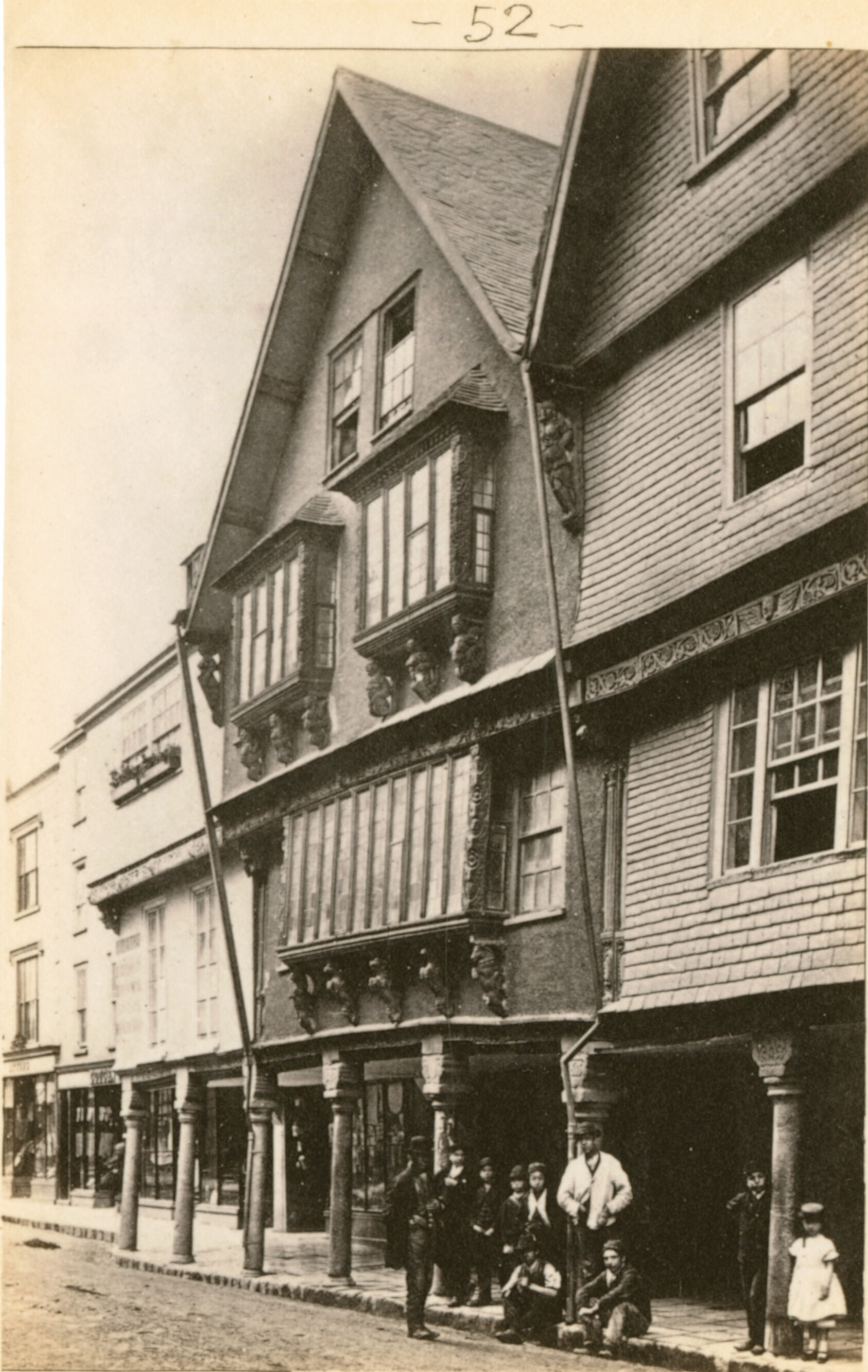
Butterwalk in Dartmouth England by Francis Bedford, c. 1863–1884. Department of Image Collections, National Gallery of Art Library.

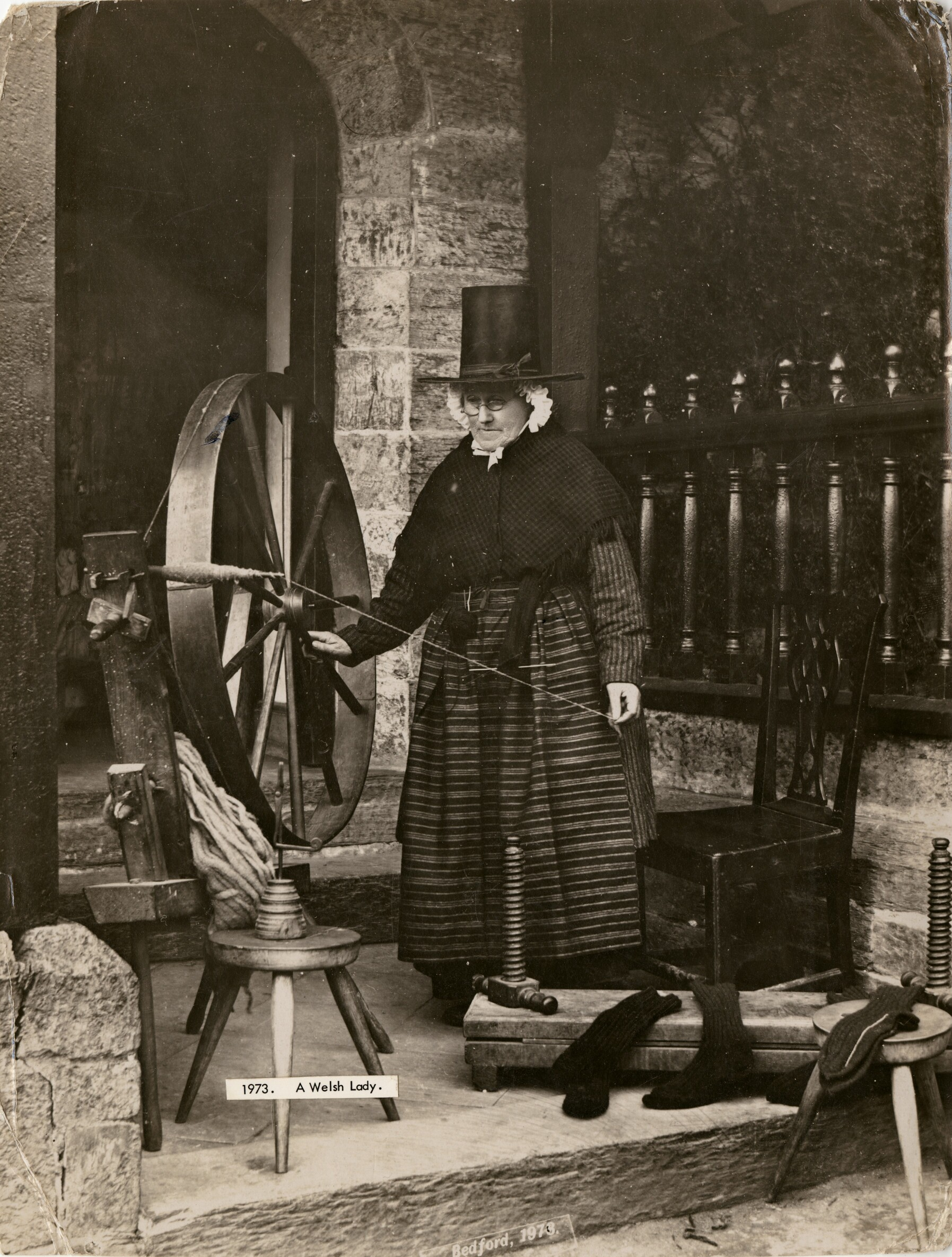
A Welsh Lady by Francis Bedford, c. 1863–1884. Department of Image Collections, National Gallery of Art Library.

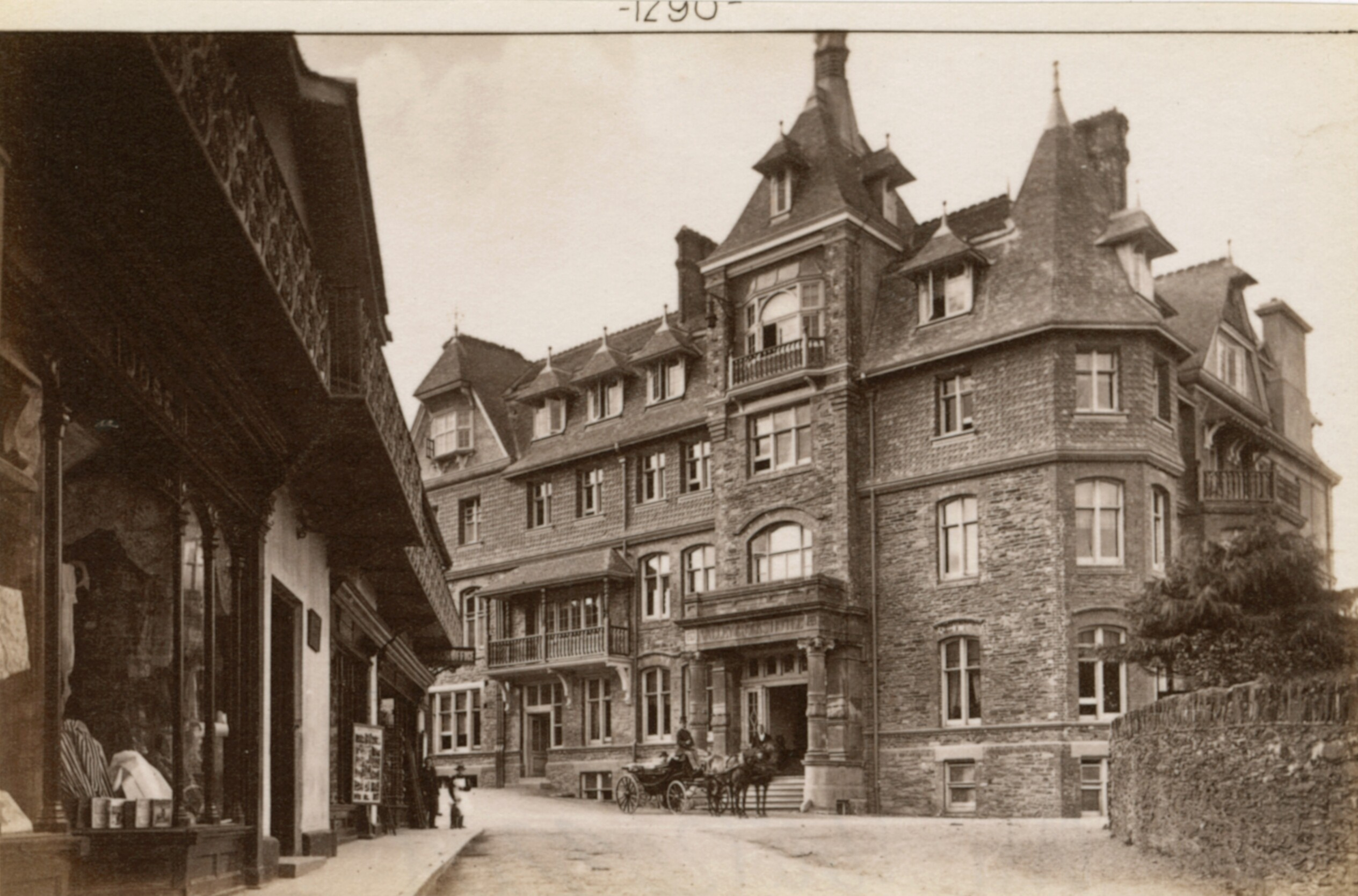
Valley of Rocks Hotel in Lynton England by Francis Bedford, c. 1863–1884. Department of Image Collections, National Gallery of Art Library.

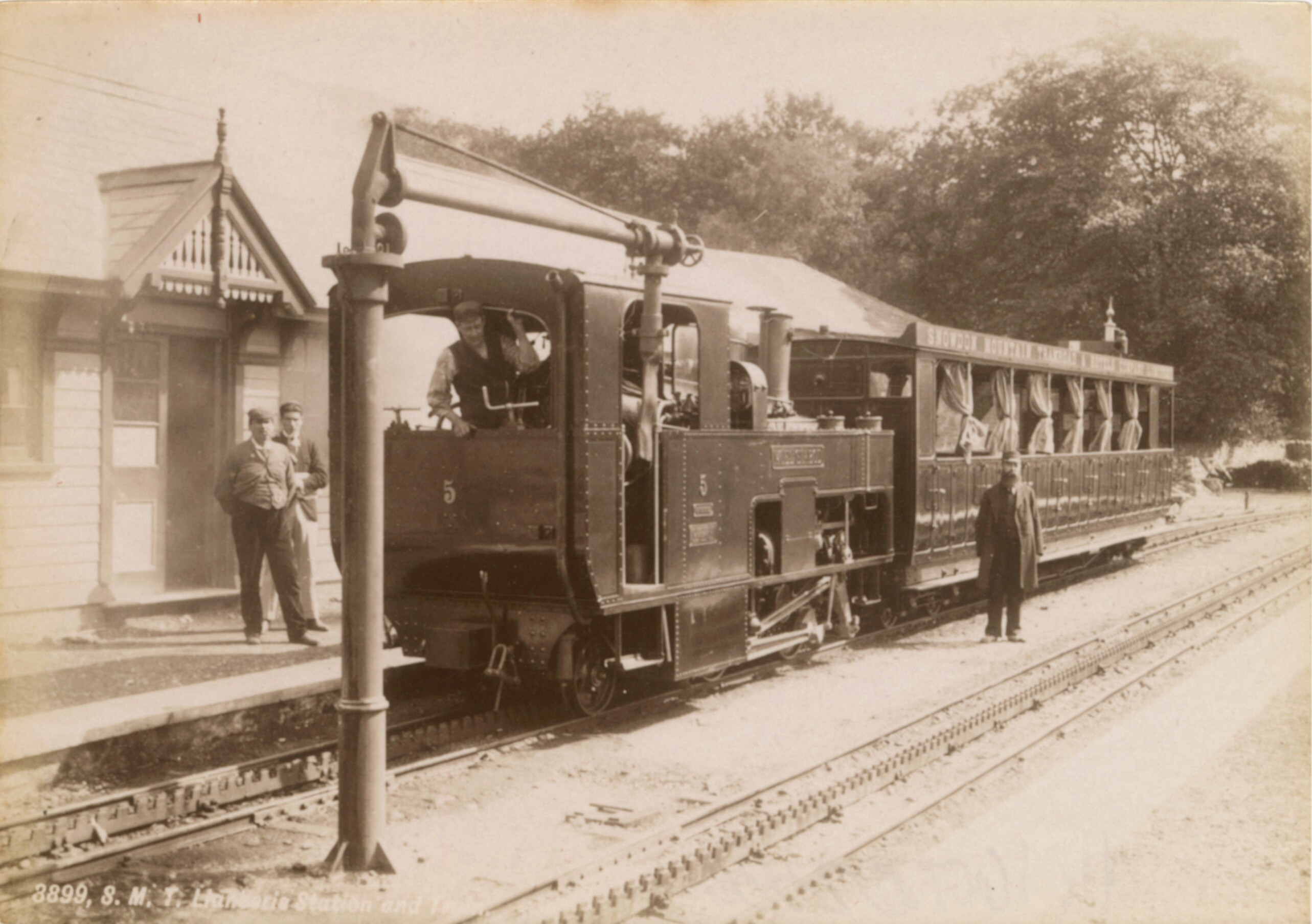
Llanberis Station in Wales by Francis Bedford, c. 1863–1884. Department of Image Collections, National Gallery of Art Library.

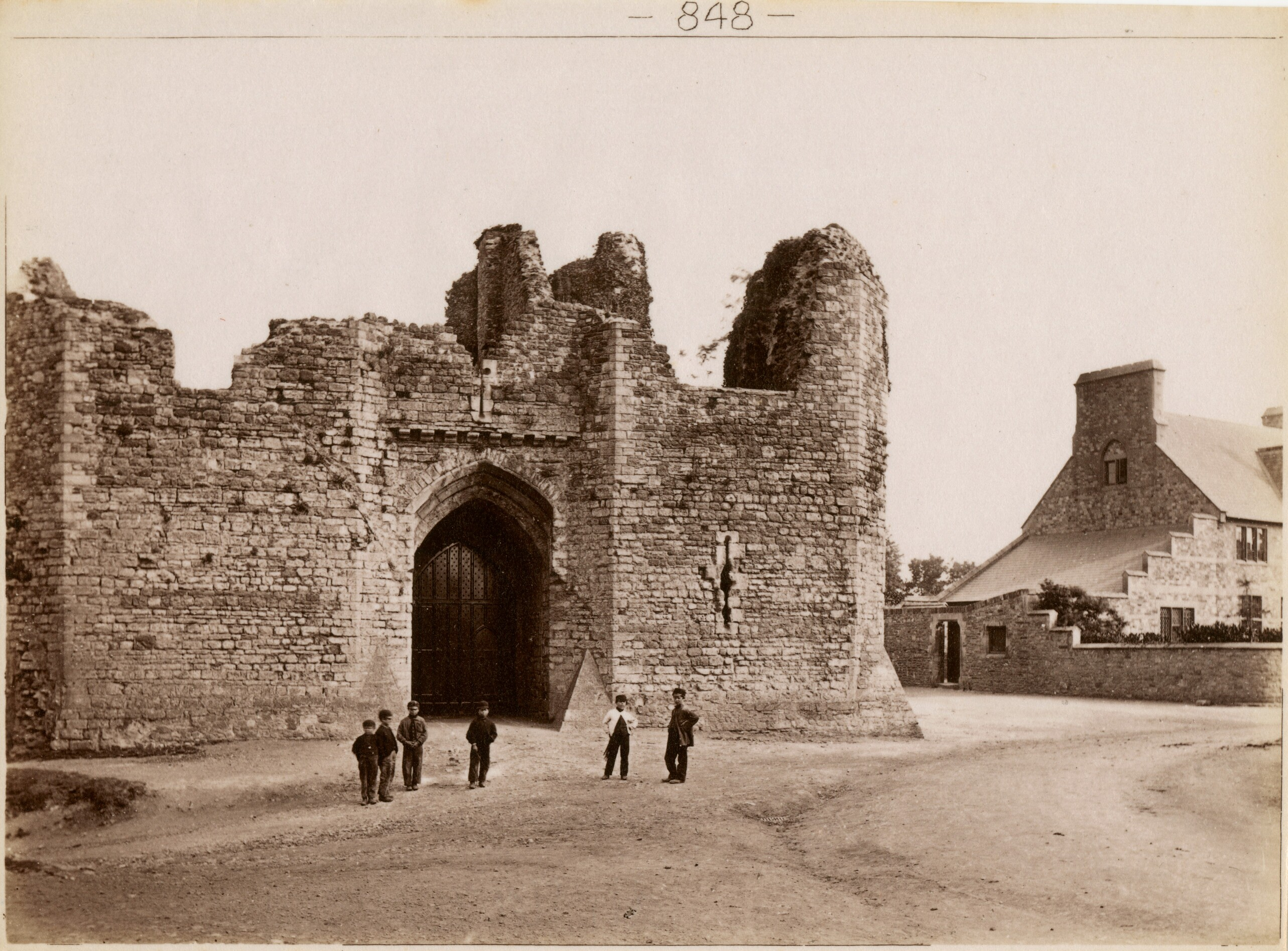
Old Bishop's Palace in Llandoff Wales by Francis Bedford, c. 1863–1884. Department of Image Collections, National Gallery of Art Library.

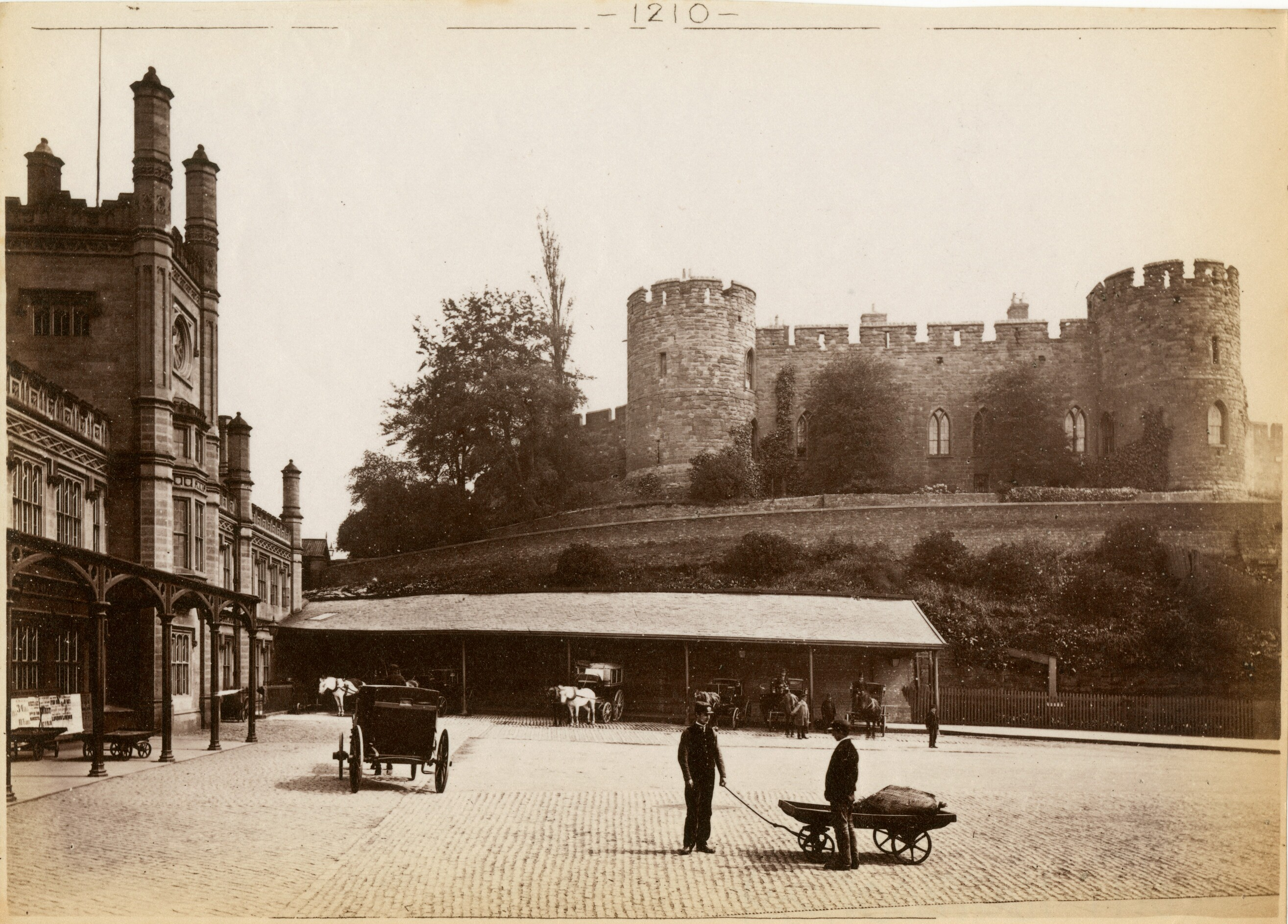
Castle in Shrewsbury England by Francis Bedford, c. 1863–1884. Department of Image Collections, National Gallery of Art Library.

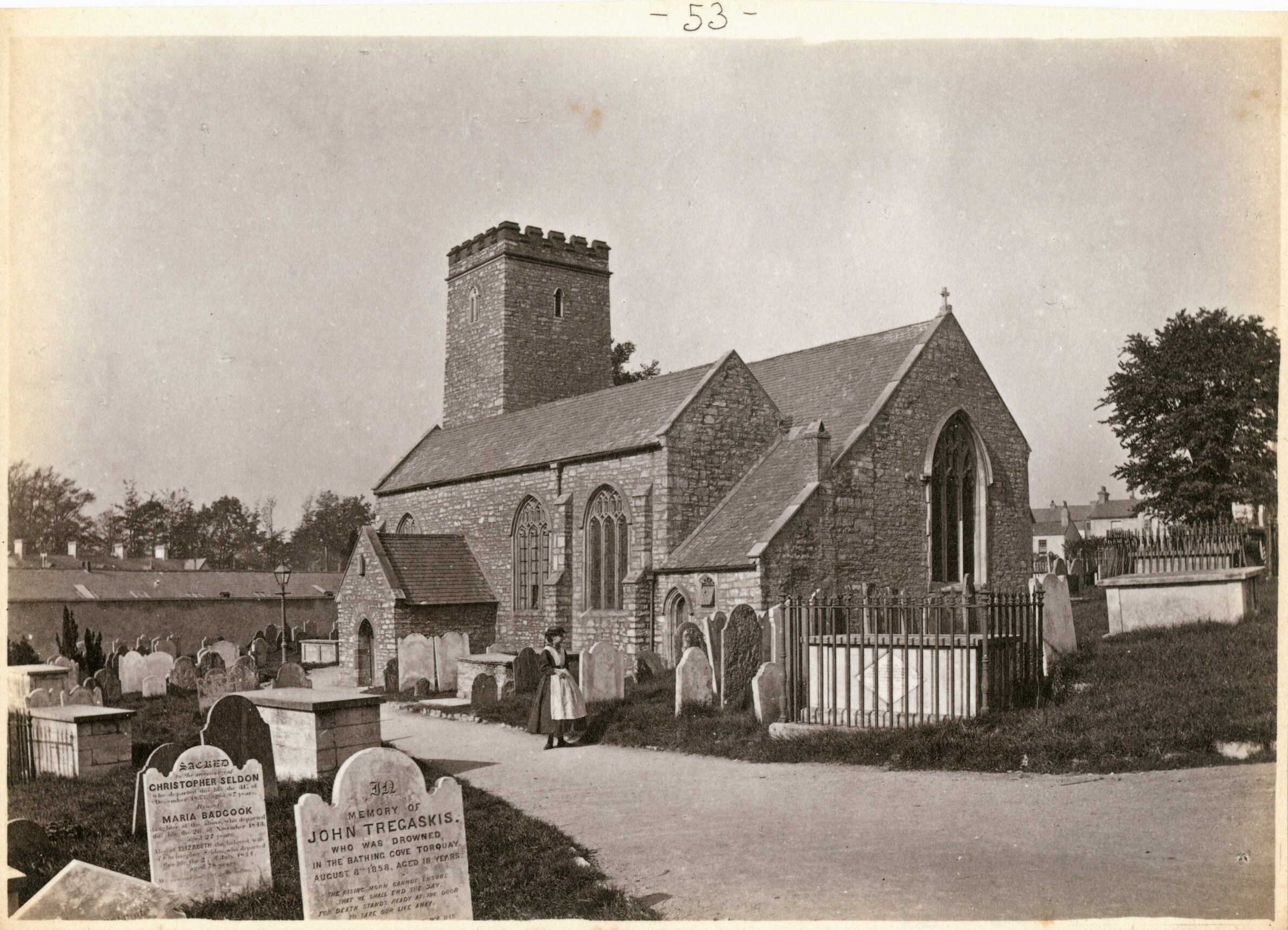
St Andrew's Church in Torquay England by Francis Bedford, c. 1863–1884. Department of Image Collections, National Gallery of Art Library.
