= No. 1455 Flight RAF =

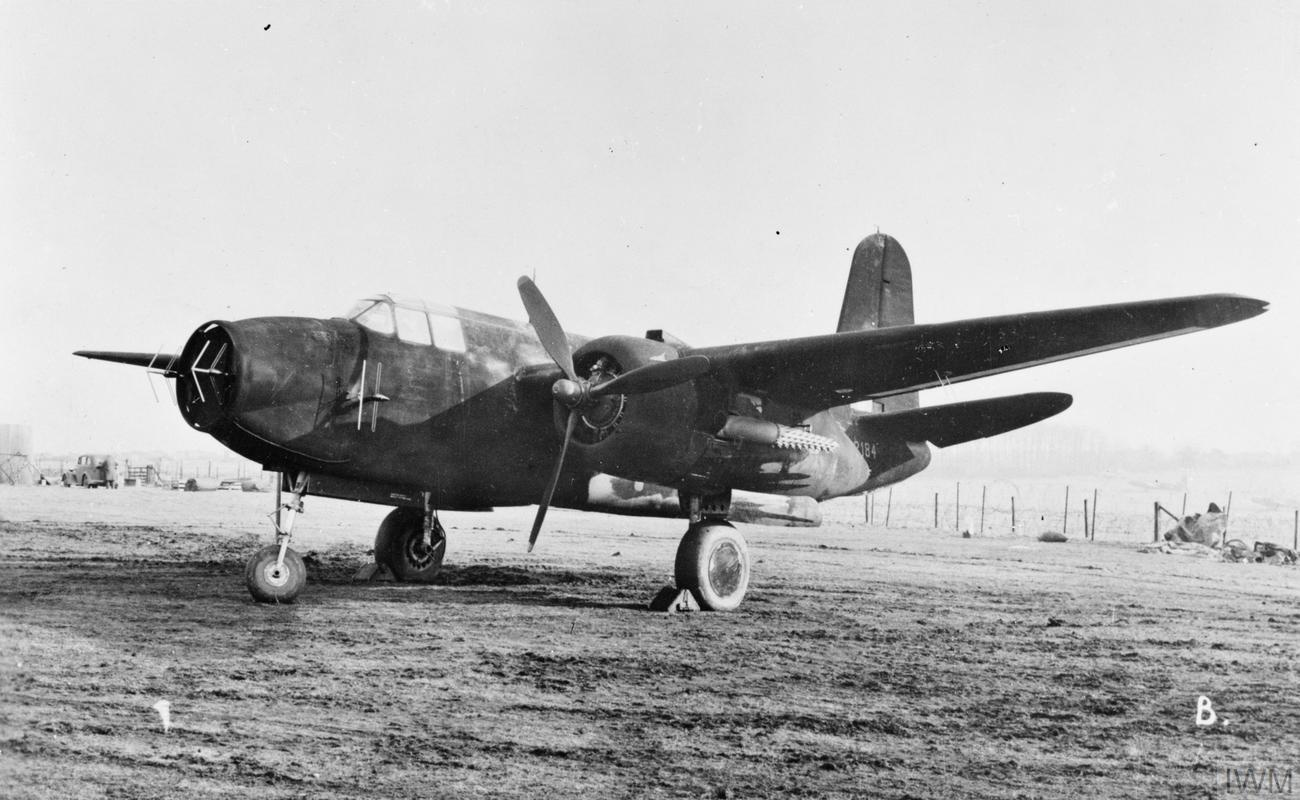
- Turbinlite Havoc
- Active: 7 Jul 1941 – 2 Sep 1942
- Country: United Kingdom
- Branch: Royal Air Force
- Role: Night Fighter (Turbinlite)
- Part of: No. 11 Group RAF, Fighter Command

Insignia
- Squadron Badge heraldry: No known badge
- Squadron Codes: No known identification code for the flight is known to have been carried

No. 1455 (Fighter) Flight was formed at RAF Tangmere, West Sussex on 7 July 1941, equipped with Turbinlite Douglas Boston and Douglas Havoc aircraft. On operations they co-operated with the Hawker Hurricanes of 1 Squadron and 3 Squadron. The flight was replaced with 534 Squadron on 2 September 1942.

534 Sqn, which had taken over men and machines, carried on flying the Turbinlite Bostons and Havocs till the system was abandoned on 25 January 1943, when Turbinlite squadrons were, due to lack of success on their part and the rapid development of AI radar, thought to be superfluous.

== Aircraft operated ==
Aircraft operated by no. 1455 Flight RAF, data from
From	To	Aircraft	Version
7 July 1941	2 September 1942	Douglas Havoc	Mk.I (Turbinlite)
7 July 1941	2 September 1942	Douglas Havoc	Mk.I
7 July 1941	2 September 1942	Douglas Havoc	Mk.II (Turbinlite)
7 July 1941	2 September 1942	Douglas Boston	Mk.II (Turbinlite)
7 July 1941	2 September 1942	Douglas Boston	Mk.III (Turbinlite)

== Flight bases ==
Bases and airfields used by no. 1455 Flight RAF, data from
From	To	Base
7 July 1941	2 September 1942	RAF Tangmere, West Sussex

== Commanding officers ==
Officers commanding no. 1455 Flight RAF, data from
From	To	Name
7 July 1941	January 1942	S/Ldr. J. Latimer, DFC
January 1942	2 September 1942	S/Ldr. G.O. Budd, DFC
