= Harry White =

Harry White may refer to:

== Politics ==
- Harry White (Australian politician) (1898–1946), Australian politician from Victoria
- Harry White (Pennsylvania politician) (1834–1920), American politician from Pennsylvania
- Harry White (Washington politician) (1859–1940), American politician, mayor of Seattle
- Harry Keith White (born 1943), American politician from West Virginia
- Harry Oliver White (1895–1987), Canadian politician

== Music ==
- Harry White (musicologist) (born 1958), Irish musicologist
- Harry White (saxophonist) (born 1967), American-born classical saxophonist
- Harry White (trombonist) (1898–1962), American jazz trombonist

== Sports ==
- Harry White (cricketer, born 1897) (1897–1978), English cricketer
- Harry White (cricketer, born 1995), English cricketer
- Harry White (footballer, born 1901) (1901–1983), English footballer
- Harry White (footballer, born 1994) (born 1994), English footballer
- Harry White (jockey) (1944–2022), Australian jockey
- Harry White (sailor) (born 2000), British sailor

== Others ==
- Harry White (Irish republican) (1916–1989), Chief of Staff of the IRA
- Harry Dexter White (1892–1948), American economist
- Harry Vere White (1837–1941), Irish Anglican cleric

== See also ==
- Henry White (disambiguation)
- Harold White (disambiguation)
- Harrison White (disambiguation)
