= Henry White (photographer) =

19th-century English photographer

- Born: 2 June 1819; London, England
- Died: 28 November 1903 (aged 84); Kensington, London
- Burial place: Highgate Cemetery, London
- Occupations: Solicitor and amateur photographer
- Known for: landscape photography
- Spouse: Louisa Ann Lindley (m. 1847; died 1893)
- Children: 3
- Parents: Richard Samuel White (father); Bridget Mylen (mother)

Henry White (1819–1903) was a London lawyer who was also recognized as one of Britain's most gifted landscape photographers.

== Personal life and legal career ==
Henry White was born in London on 2 June 1819, the third of six children of the lawyer Richard Samuel White and his wife Bridget Mylen. The family lived at 18 Brunswick Square in Bloomsbury and Henry trained as a solicitor, joining his father's partnership, becoming White, Carew & White of 11 Lincoln's Inn Fields which later became White & Son when George Carew left the firm in 1841. Henry White continued to practice as a solicitor after the death of his father in 1859.

In 1847 White married Louisa Ann Lindley (1822–1893), the daughter of Charles Lindley, a Mansfield quarry owner and they had three children, Henry, Louisa and Alice, born between 1849 and 1852.

== Photography ==
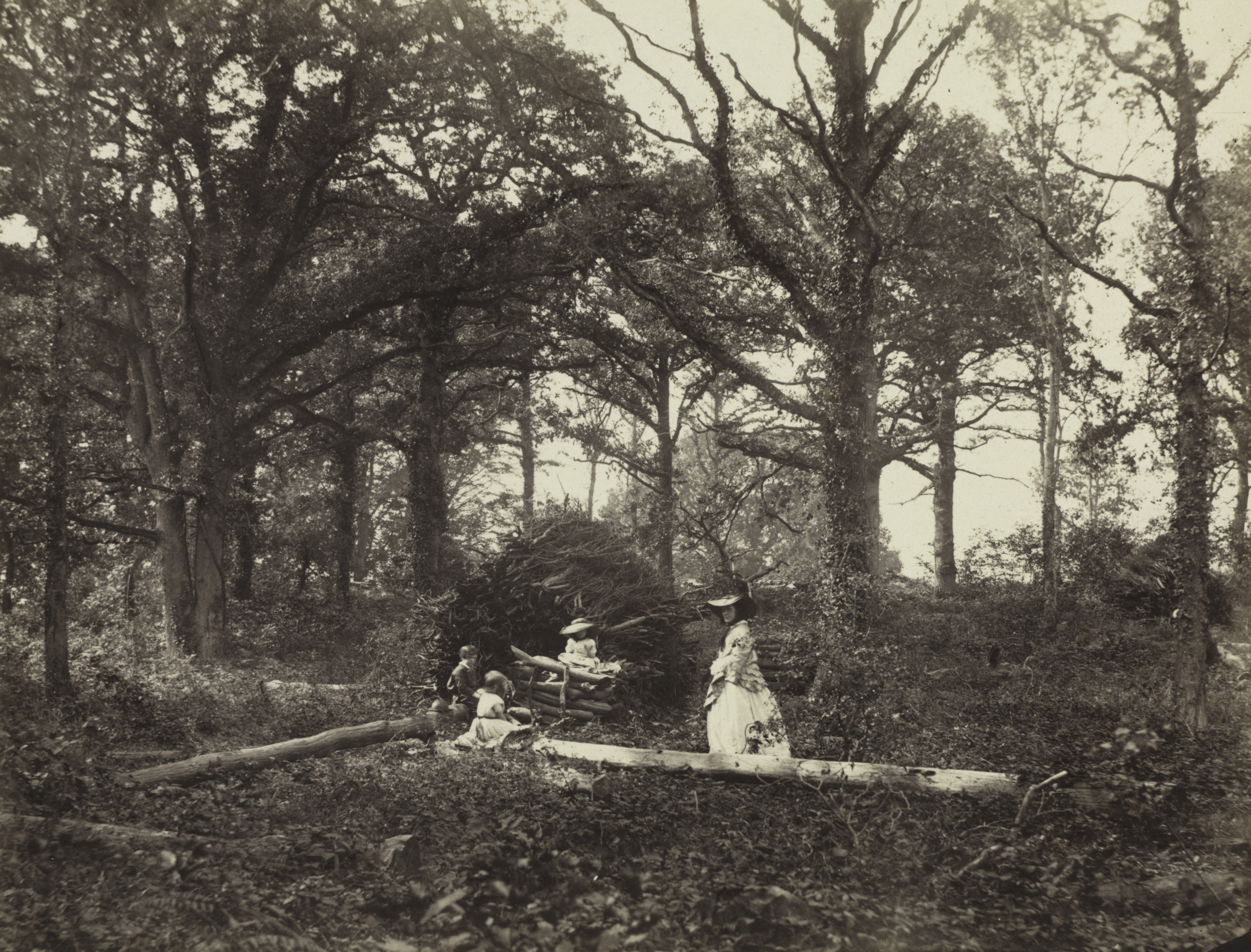
1856 landscape taken in North Wales

It is White's skill as an amateur photographer during the 1850s and 1860s, rather than as a lawyer, which is responsible for his reputation. He produced picturesque English landscapes, mainly taken in Surrey and North Wales, which helped to establish the aesthetic standard for 19th-century British landscape photography. Common subjects were cottages, mills, and fields, as well as closeup views of foliage and other images of nature.

He joined the Photographic Society of London in 1855, serving as its treasurer between 1866 and 1872 and contributed photographs to their albums in 1855 and 1857. He also belonged to the Photographic Society of Great Britain.

He was prolific exhibitor, showing at least 237 photographs in the eight years from 1855 and meeting with considerable praise; he won the highest medal at the 1855 Exposition Universelle in Paris and his landscape photographs and won a gold medal at the International Exhibition in Brussels in 1856. That same year, White published a series of views of London. He also exhibited at the Manchester Art Treasures Exhibition (1857) and the International Exhibition (1862).

An example of his best known style is an intimate, lyrical landscape taken in 1856 in northern Wales. The family in the photograph is almost certainly his own, and he has carefully balanced his desire to faithfully record elaborate details with broad atmospheric effects. As with many of his images, this print registers a city-dweller's delight in finding himself in natural surroundings.

== Death ==
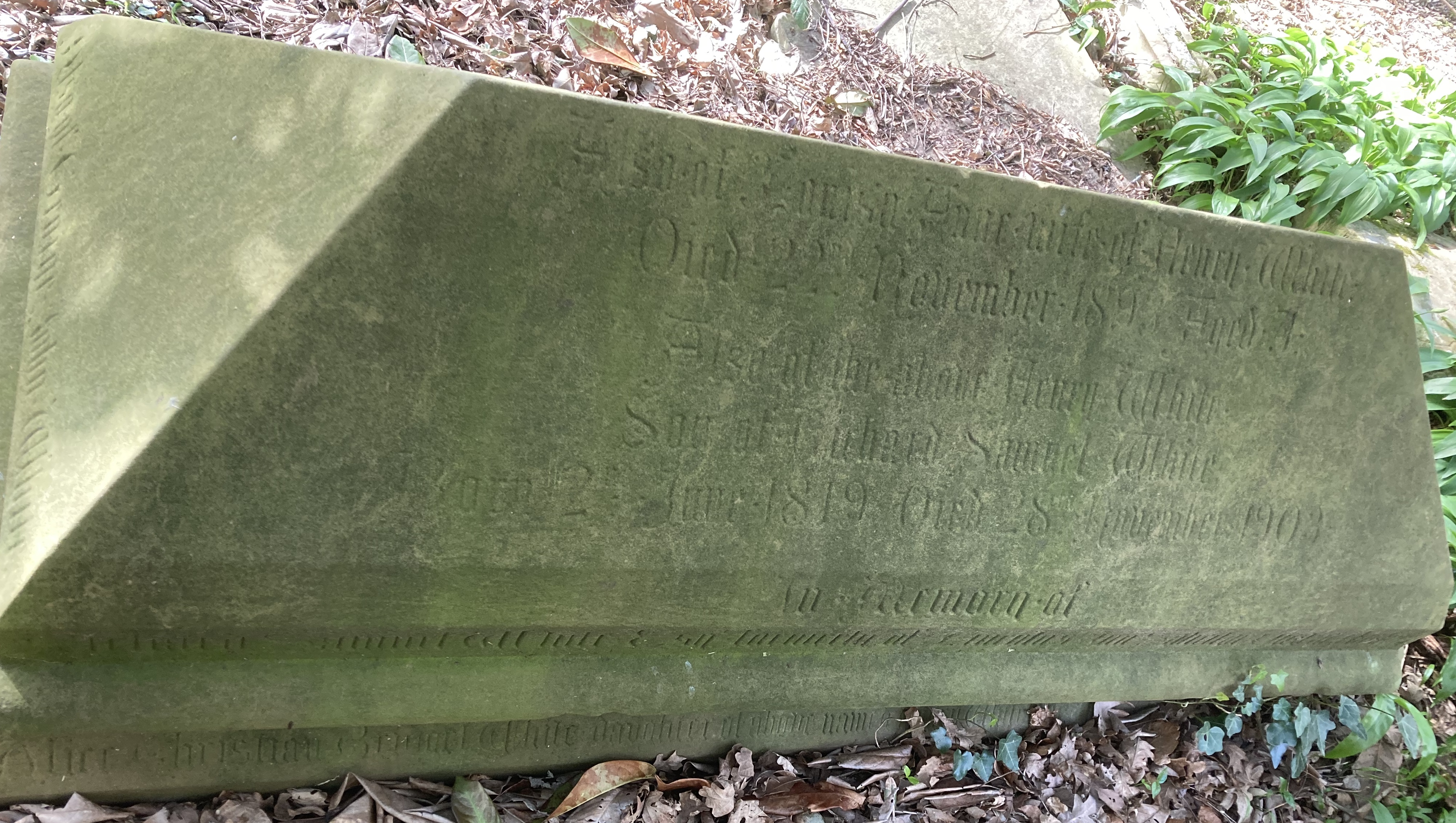
Family grave of Henry White in Highgate Cemetery

White died at his home, 9 Campden Hill Gardens, Kensington on 28 November 1903 and is buried in a family grave on the west side of Highgate Cemetery close to the grave of another celebrated Victorian landscape photographer, Francis Bedford.
