= Harold O. White =

American football and basketball coach (1886–1969)

Biographical details
- Born: November 2, 1886; Wilson, New York, U.S.
- Died: August 29, 1969 (aged 82); Mercer County, Pennsylvania, U.S.

Playing career

Football
- 1904–1907: Hamilton

Coaching career (HC unless noted)

Football
- 1908–1911: Hackley School (NY) (assistant)
- 1912–1916: Grove City (assistant)
- 1917–1918: Grove City

Basketball
- 1917–1918: Grove City

Head coaching record
- Overall: 5–3–1 (football); 2–7 (basketball)

Harold Otis White (November 2, 1886 – August 29, 1969) was an American football and basketball coach. He served as the head coach at Grove City College in Grove City, Pennsylvania for two seasons, from 1917 to 1918, compiling a record of 5–3–1. White was also the head basketball coach at Grove City for one season, in 1917–18, tallying a mark of 2–7.

== Head coaching record ==
=== Football ===
Year	Team	Overall	Conference	Standing	Bowl/playoffs
Grove City Crimson (Independent) (1917–1918)
1917	Grove City	4–2–1			
1918	Grove City	1–1			
Grove City:		5–3–1			
Total:		5–3–1			
