= No Sin Evades His Gaze =

British heavy metal band

- Origin: Blackpool, England, United Kingdom
- Genres: Progressive metal, metalcore, djent, groove metal
- Years active: 2013–present
- Members: James Denton; Moat "Cor, He's a Bigun'" Lowe; Dan Thornton; Theo Harvey
- Past members: Kevin Pearson

No Sin Evades His Gaze are a British heavy metal band, formed in 2013 by former Ravenface vocalist James Denton.

== Career ==
The band released their debut album titled "Age of Sedation" in July 2014, alongside a music video for the eponymous track. The album was met with critical acclaim, with Metal Hammer calling the band "the future of heavy tech" and The Guardian stating "Whilst it’s slightly sickening that people so young can play their instruments to such an insanely high level, the resultant racket is undeniably thrilling". Prior to the album's release, the band released the track "Age of Sedation" via Planet Rock Radio on 2 May 2014, and the track "Roll Up The Royalty" via Metal Hammer on 10 June 2014.

The band toured throughout the UK during the summer and autumn of 2014, including playing at the prestigious Bloodstock Open Air festival on Friday 8 August 2014.

The band continued to tour throughout 2015, supporting bands such as Xerath on 18 February 2015, and Monuments on 9 August 2015.

They released a single titled Preacher on 11 October 2015, with another single titled If Only To Fall released in March 2017. They released their second studio album titled Endless Disconnect on 12 May 2017, to critical praise.

== Musical style and influences ==
The band's style is stated to take influence from progressive metal, groove metal, metalcore and also been affiliated with the djent movement. Their music is very riff driven, taking ideas from bands such as Pantera and Lamb of God. The band are also known for their aggressive lyrical style and delivery.

== Members ==
Current members

- James Denton - lead vocals (2013–present)
- Dan Thornton - guitars (2013–present)
- Mot - bass (2013–present)
- Theo Harvey - drums, vocals (2013–present)

Former members

- Kevin Pearson - guitars (2013–2015)

== Discography ==
Albums

- Age of Sedation (2014)
- Endless Disconnect (2017)

Singles

- Preacher (2015)
- If Only to Fall (2017)
