= Henry White (Scottish footballer) =

Scottish footballer

Personal information
- Full name: Henry White
- Place of birth: Scotland
- Position: Centre forward

Senior career*
Years	Team	Apps	(Gls)
1894–1895	Hibernian	4	(2)
1895–1896	Hamilton Academical		
1897–1898	Sheffield United	6	(0)
Total		10	(2)
- * Club domestic league appearances and goals

Henry White was a Scottish footballer who played in the Football League for Sheffield United.
