= No. 534 Squadron RAF =

Defunct flying squadron of the Royal Air Force

- Active: 2 Sep 1942 – 25 Jan 1943
- Country: United Kingdom
- Branch: Royal Air Force
- Role: Turbinlite nightfighter squadron
- Part of: No. 11 Group RAF, Fighter Command

No. 534 Squadron RAF was one of the ten Turbinlite nightfighter squadrons of the Royal Air Force during the Second World War.

== History ==
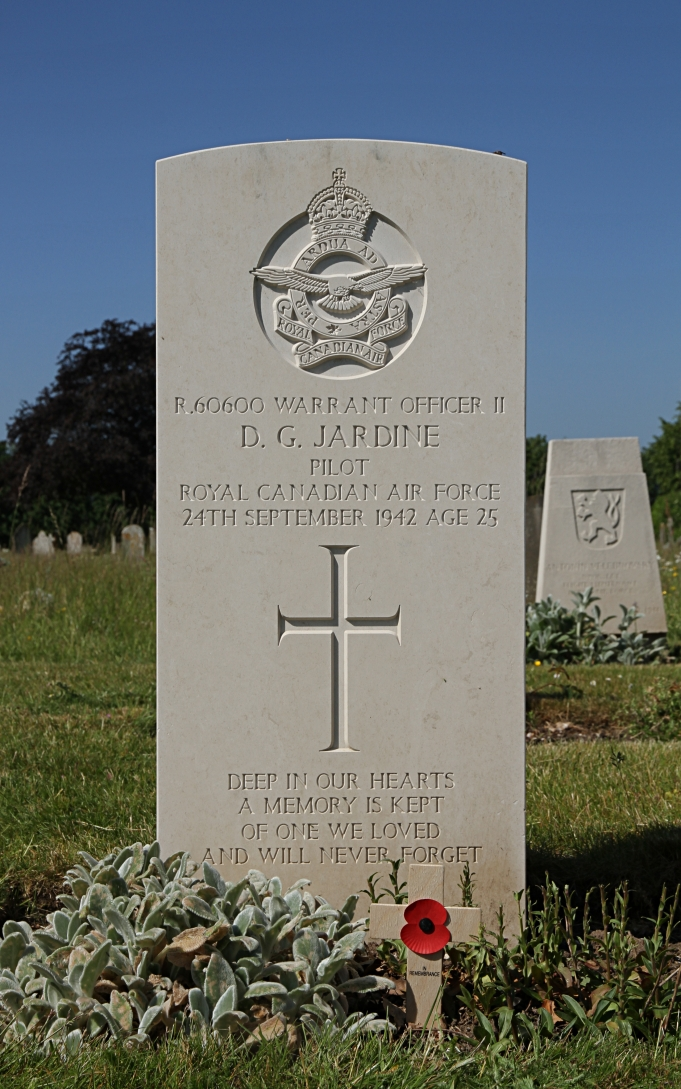
CWGC headstone of a member of 534 Squadron who died in the first month of its operation. WO2 Douglas Jardine was on secondment from the Royal Canadian Air Force and is buried at Chichester in England

No. 534 Squadron was formed at RAF Tangmere, Sussex on 2 September 1942, from No. 1455 (Turbinlite) Flight, as part of No. 11 Group RAF in Fighter Command. Instead of operating only Turbinlite and -rudimentary- Airborne Intercept (AI) radar equipped aircraft (Havocs and Bostons) and working together with a normal nightfighter unit the unit now also flew with their own Hawker Hurricanes. It was disbanded at Tangmere on 25 January 1943, when Turbinlite squadrons were, due to lack of success on their part and the rapid development of AI radar, thought to be superfluous.

== Aircraft operated ==
Aircraft operated by No. 534 Squadron RAF, data from
From	To	Aircraft	Version
2 September 1942	25 January 1943	Douglas Havoc	Mk.I (Turbinlite)
2 September 1942	25 January 1943	Douglas Havoc	Mk.II (Turbinlite)
2 September 1942	25 January 1943	Douglas Boston	Mk.I (Nightfighter)
2 September 1942	25 January 1943	Douglas Boston	Mk.III (Turbinlite)
2 September 1942	25 January 1943	Hawker Hurricane	Mk.IIc

== Squadron bases ==
Bases and airfields used by No. 534 Squadron RAF, data from
From	To	Base
2 September 1942	25 January 1943	RAF Tangmere, Sussex

== Commanding officers ==
Officers commanding No. 534 Squadron RAF, data from
From	To	Name
2 September 1942	25 January 1943	S/Ldr. K. Matthews
