= Robin Haigh =

British composer

- Born: 1993 (age 32–33); United Kingdom
- Genre: Classical
- Occupations: Musician, composer
- Years active: 2014–Present
- Website: robinhaigh.com

Robin Haigh (born 1993 in London) is an Irish/British composer of contemporary classical music.

== Career ==
In 2017, Robin Haigh won a BASCA British Composer Award at the age of 24 for his recorder quintet, In Feyre Foreste. His piece Zorthern features on the NMC Recordings label performed by Luke Carver Goss and the Royal Northern Sinfonia. In 2018, he was chosen to be a part of the London Symphony Orchestra's Soundhub scheme, as well as PRS for Music's Accelerate scheme, and the University of Sheffield's workshop with the Ligeti Quartet. In 2019 he was commissioned by the Britten Sinfonia to write a piece for chamber orchestra, supported by the William Alwyn foundation. In July 2019, he was announced as a 2019–20 Royal Philharmonic Society composer, leading to a commission for the 2020 Presteigne Festival. He won an Ivor Novello Award in the Chamber Orchestral category in 2020, and in 2021 was nominated in the Solo Works category. In 2022 he was voted joint-winner of the Composer Slam European Championship for his piece AESOP 2, which was performed in Hanover by Orchester im Treppenhaus. In October 2025 he received two Ivor Novello Award nominations for his pieces FILTH and LUCK.

He studied composition at Goldsmiths, University of London and the Royal Academy of Music, with teachers including Dmitri Smirnov, Edmund Finnis, and David Sawer.

== Notable works ==
- LUCK concerto for trumpet and orchestra (2024)
- Concerto for Orchestra (2023)
- THE DREAMERS quadruple concerto for four trombones and large ensemble (2022)
- AESOP 2 for untrained recorder soloist, large ensemble and electronics (2021)
- SLEEPTALKER for orchestra (2021)
- No One for solo harp (2020)
- Grin for chamber orchestra (2019)
- Aesop for solo recorder and eight players (2019)
- Twenty One Minute Pieces for four players (2018)
- Zorthern for solo accordion and six players (2017)
- In Feyre Foreste for five recorders (2016)
- 1936 for two narrators and large ensemble (2016)
- The Man Who Woke Up, opera in one act (2014)
- Samoyeds, movement from a string quartet (2018)
