= No. 255 Squadron RAF =

Former flying squadron of the Royal Air Force

- Hand-painted metallic casting circa 1950, depicting the Squadron's official badge
- Active: 6 July 1918 – 14 January 1919; 23 November 1940 – 30 April 1946
- Country: United Kingdom
- Branch: Royal Air Force
- Motto: Latin: Ad Auroram ("To the break of dawn")
- Mascot: (1942) A Bull Mastiff

Insignia
- Squadron badge heraldry: A panther’s head cabossed Sable eyed and tongued proper
- Squadron codes: YD (November 1940 – April 1946)

No. 255 Squadron RAF was a Royal Air Force Squadron formed as an anti-submarine unit in First World War and a night-fighter unit in the Second World War. The First World War squadron was formed from former Royal Naval Air Service coastal flights and was responsible for coastal anti-submarine patrols. It was disbanded after the war.

During the Second World War the squadron operated as a night fighter unit, at first with the Boulton Paul Defiant and later the Bristol Beaufighter. It served in the United Kingdom from 1940 to 1942 when it moved to operate in North Africa and then Italy, where it remained until the end of the war. It subsequently served in Malta, and then Egypt, before being disbanded in 1946.

== First World War ==
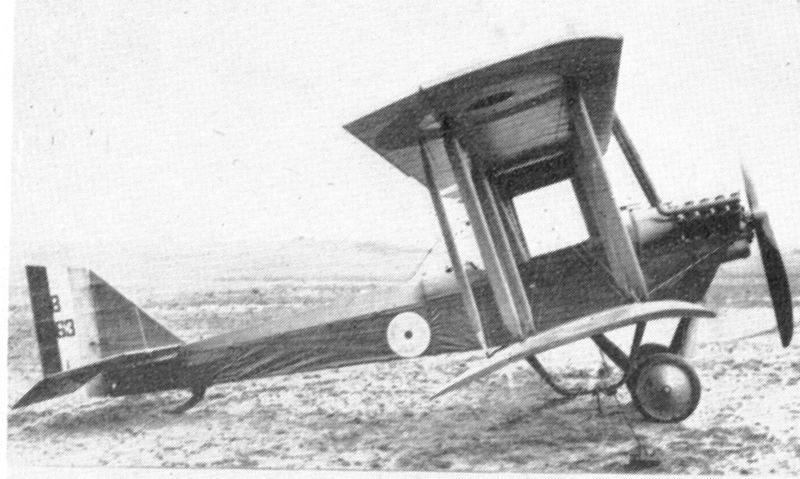
An Airco DH.6 similar to one flown by 255 Squadron

The squadron was formed at Pembroke, Wales, to manage a number of "Special Duties" flights that had been created for coastal operations against U-boats. On 6 June 1918, these flights were formed as: No. 519 and No. 520 Flights at Pembroke, No. 521 and No. 522 Flights at Anglesey and No. 523 and No. 524 Flights at Luce Bay. The squadron was equipped with Airco DH.6 aircraft. These single-engine biplanes could carry either a 100 lb bomb or an observer in addition to the pilot, but not both.

The sole function of No. 255 Squadron during the war was anti-submarine warfare. Initially, the squadron operated within a zone defined as "10m NW Fishguard to 10m S of Caldey Island", but shortly after its establishment, this was extended to 15 miles south of Caldey Island. The squadron's aircraft did not have wireless telegraphy radio set so were restricted to inshore patrols.

On 10 July 1918, a patrol by a No. 255 Squadron aircraft reported sighting a hostile periscope at location 64LYK. The following day a target in the same area was attacked by Short seaplanes from another squadron.

No. 255 Squadron's first claimed strike against the enemy occurred on 14 August 1918 when Lieutenant Peebles in a DH.6 (Note: This was serial number C9439) attacked a submarine at periscope depth at 09:35 with a 100 lb bomb. This resulted in air bubbles and an oil slick. Peebles returned to Pembroke and was later involved in another attack against the submarine, which resulted in further oil being brought to the surface. The Admiralty's assessment at the time classified the result of the strike as "U-boat possibly damaged", giving the decoded position as 51°17'N, 05°04'W. There is no recorded loss of a U-boat in the area.

On 15 August 1918, No. 521 and 522 Flights were separated to form No. 244 Squadron. Nos. 523 and 529 Flights formed No. 258 Squadron leaving 255 with only two flights at Pembroke. The squadron was disbanded on 14 January 1919.

== Second World War ==
The squadron reformed on 23 November 1940 at RAF Kirton in Lindsey, Lincolnshire. In May 1941, it moved to a satellite field at Hibaldstow, followed by a spell at RAF Coltishall in Norfolk with a detachment at RAF West Malling Kent, thereafter High Ercall and Honiley. Almost exclusively, the squadron was involved in night-time air defence throughout this time period.

In November 1942, within days of the Operation Torch landings, the squadron moved in part by air and in part by sea from England to Algeria, soon establishing a forward operating base in Tunisia. In Africa, their role expanded somewhat. Night-time air defence predominated but, additionally, daylight defence of Mediterranean convoys and a few air-sea rescue searches also took place. Experimentally, there were a small number of night intruder missions into Sardinia. Following the final defeat of the Afrika Korps, the squadron consolidated at a single location at La Sebala II, Tunisia.

=== Kirton Lindsey ===
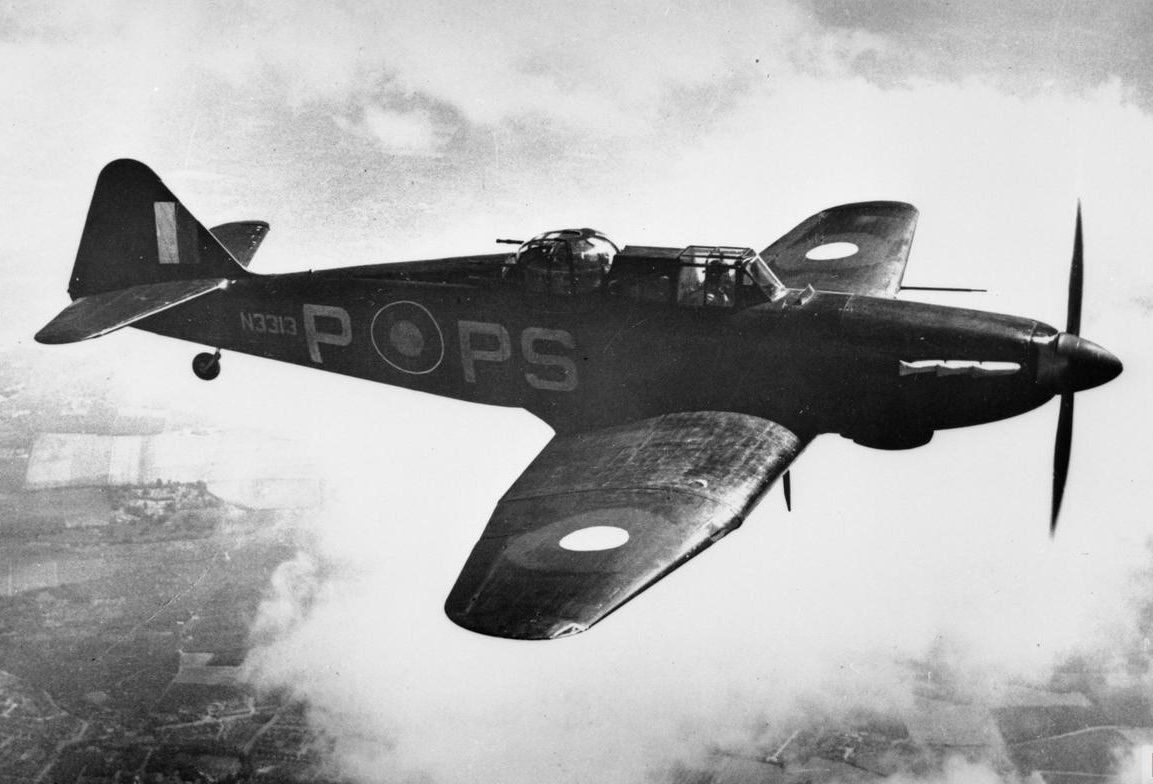
A Boulton Paul Defiant Mk.I. similar to that used by No. 255 Squadron.

The squadron re-formed on 23 November 1940 at RAF Kirton in Lindsey. It became operational as a night fighter unit on 5 January 1941, assigned to No.12 Group, but due to snow no flying took place until 8 January 1941. Equipped with the Bolton Paul Defiant Mk.I turret fighter, the squadron used Ground-Controlled Interception (GCI) techniques to guide its aircraft toward their targets, using a procedure called "vectoring". In effect, the GCI Station did the work of a navigator, calculating the course to steer and altitude to achieve in order to intercept the moving target. The ground station then transmitted this information to the fighter pilot by radio; to achieve a successful interception, accurate guidance was required.

The night of 10/11 February 1941 saw the squadron's first combat successes, with pilots claiming two Heinkel He 111s as "probably destroyed". On 17 February, the fitting of VHF radios to the squadron's aircraft, a process that had taken nearly two months, was completed. Five Hawker Hurricane single-seat fighters were delivered to the squadron while it was at Kirton Lindsey to supplement the Defiants. These arrived over the period 21–23 March. Not all were in serviceable condition on receipt, but two combat victories were achieved with these aircraft.

On the night of 9 May, the Luftwaffe launched a series of raids against targets in England's north-east and the Midlands, with 129 bombers attacking Hull, 95 attacking Nottingham and 34 being sent against Sheffield. In response, the squadron shot down six enemy bombers (five He 111s and one Ju 88) and damaged a seventh within the space of half an hour, all achieved without loss to the squadron's personnel or aircraft. This was the most confirmed shootdowns by a British night-fighter squadron in a single night of the whole war, with congratulations received including a personal message from Sir Archibald Sinclair, the Secretary of State for Air.

The squadron departed RAF Kirton Lindsey on the 15th, although due to some facilities at RAF Hibaldstow not being complete, the squadron's administrative HQ and some maintenance activities remained at Kirton Lindsey. The split of administrative location continued until 9 June.

=== Hibaldstow ===
The squadron's posting to Hibaldstow resulted in little combat. Much of the Luftwaffe bomber force that had been ranged against the east coast ports of Hull and Grimsby during the squadron's time at RAF Kirton Lindsey had, in May 1941, been moved to the Russian Front ready to support Operation Barbarossa, the German invasion of Eastern Europe. In local terms at least, the Blitz was over and apart from some token raids designed to create the pretence of ongoing strategic bombing, the night fighters guarding the ports of the Humber Estuary were left short of targets.

On 16 June 1941, the squadron took delivery of its first Blenheim I light bomber, for the purposes of training on twin engined aircraft prior to converting to Beaufighters. The squadron started to re-equip with the twin-engined Beaufighter from 22 July 1941 and by 6 August was at full strength with 18 aircraft. The transition did not go smoothly and it would take over a year, diagnosis of the cause of multiple engine supercharger failures on the Beaufighter Mk.II's Merlin XX engines, re-equipment with Mk.VI Beaufighters (which had Bristol Hercules engines) and a move to North Africa before combat victories resumed in numbers that exceeded the squadron's aircrew losses to causes other than enemy action.

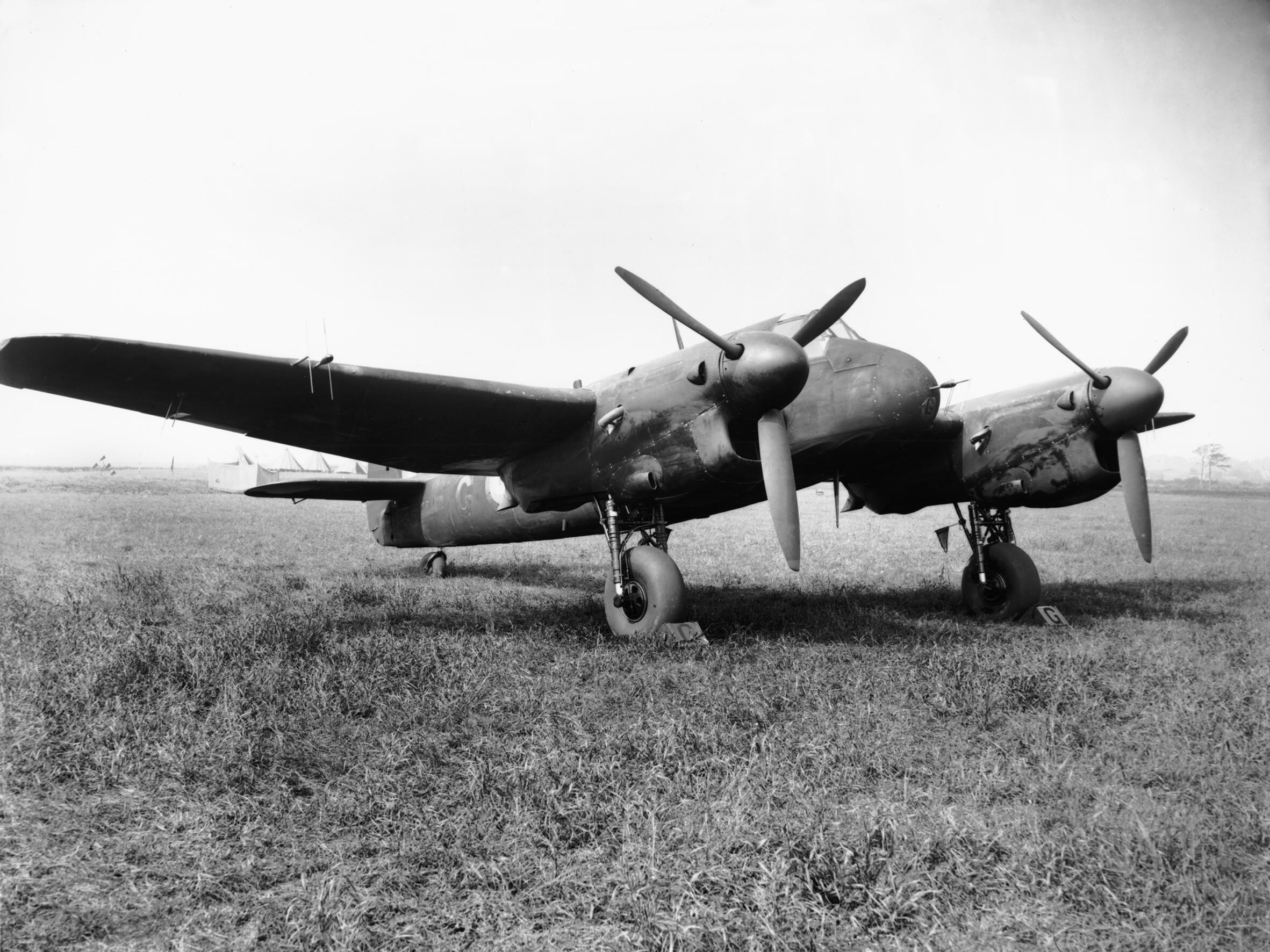
R2402, coded YD-G, a Beaufighter Mk.II night fighter of No. 255 Squadron at RAF Hibaldstow, 5 September 1941

The squadron's next move, from Hibaldstow to Coltishall, commenced on 16 August 1941. After their arrival, it was determined that only two of 255's crews were combat ready in their new aircraft. As a result, late on 23 August 1941, the squadron was deemed non-operational to "complete conversion to and training on Beaufighters". All but two aircraft were ordered back to RAF Hibaldstow, with the two that remained being attached to the more experienced No. 604 Squadron. Following the completion of further training, a second attempt to move to Coltishall was made over the period 19–21 September.

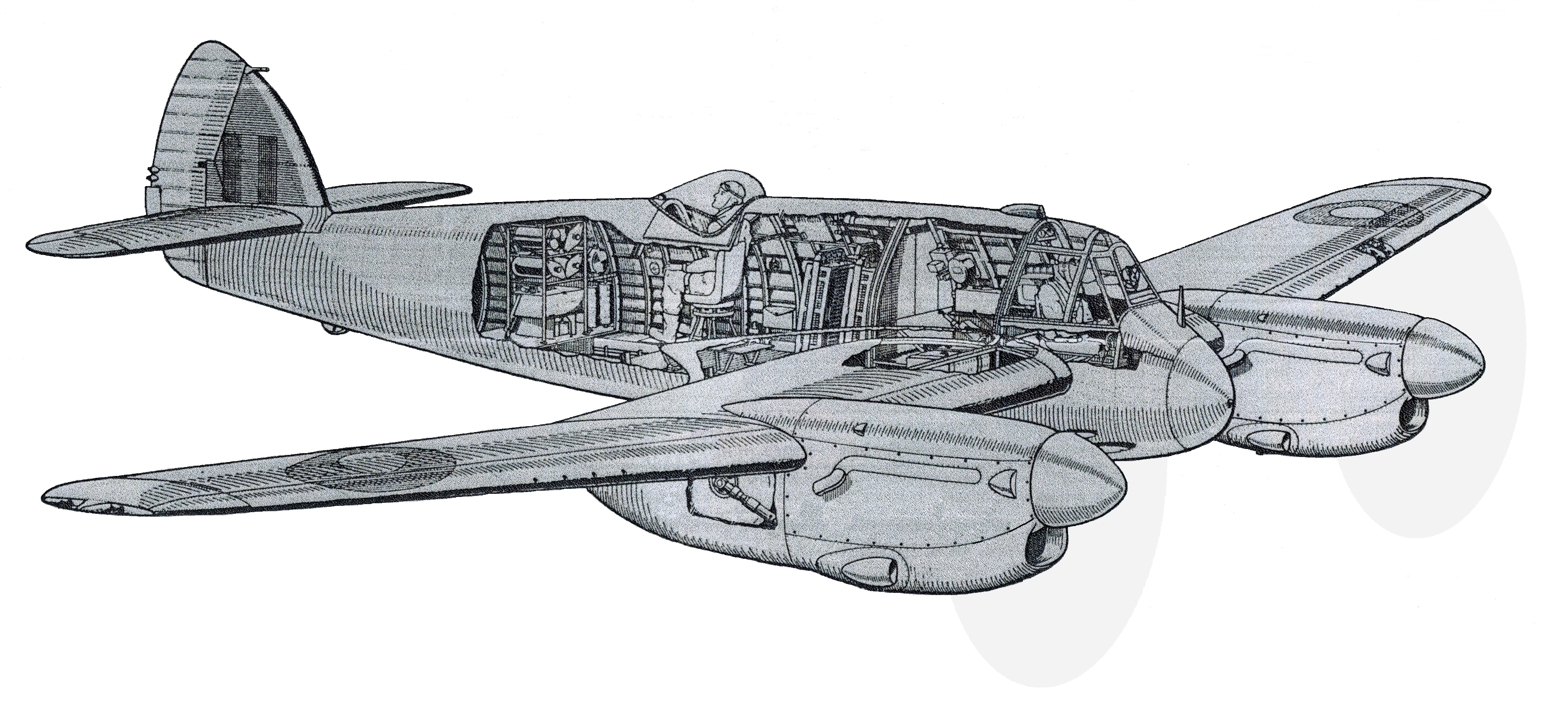
Cut-away drawing of a Beaufighter Mk.II, adapted from the frontispiece of Pilot's Notes, A.P. 1721B Vol.1.

=== Coltishall ===
Following the move to RAF Coltishall in Norfolk the squadron continued to train on the Beaufighter although they continued to experience set backs with several aircraft suffering engine problems. On 3 January, five Beaufighter aircraft were moved on detachment to RAF West Malling when the squadron became twinned with No.29 Squadron in order to provide crew rotation out of territory known as "Hell Fire Corner". On 14 January, a 255 Squadron crew on this rotation scored a victory over a Dornier Do.217, which was shot down off Ostend, but overall successes remained elusive. The rotation arrangement continued until 16 February 1942.

On 28 January 1942, the squadron was notified that it would be re-equipped with either the Beaufighter Mk.VI or the Mosquito, with the change also involving a move from RAF Coltishall to RAF High Ercall, Shropshire, in No.9 Group's operational area. That relocation commenced on 2 March 1942, again taking the squadron out of the front line. Once the root causes of the high accident rate amongst experienced pilots had been identified, the Air Ministry took action as soon as the aircraft supply situation permitted. The squadron suffered 20 non-combat incidents whilst at Coltishall resulting in deaths or injury to crew members, damage to an aircraft or a forced landing away from home base. Of these, four arose primarily because of Merlin XX engine failure resulting in eight deaths.

=== High Ercall ===
The advance party left Coltishall for RAF High Ercall, moving by air and rail, on 1 March 1942 and all serviceable aircraft followed on 8 March. Following the move, the squadron started to re-equip with the Beaufighter VI and operational night flying resumed using Mk.VI aircraft on the night of 7–8 April 1942, when "precautionary night patrol" sortie was flown. No enemy aircraft were located during the patrol, and on return the crew reported a defective radar set.

From 28 April two aircraft were placed on 30 minute availability throughout the daytime in order to deal with enemy aircraft operating in conditions unsuitable for day fighters. This kept the squadron's personnel busy during what a relatively quiet period in the air war over England. Entries in the squadron's ORB during this period record mostly "no operational night flying. No enemy aircraft in the Sector." The comment was often suffixed by "...and weather u/s".

On 6 June 1942, the squadron moved from RAF High Ercall to RAF Honiley, in Warwickshire, where they rotated with No. 257 Squadron RAF, No. 3010 Echelon and No. 1456 Flight RAF. The move was completed in a single day.

=== Honiley ===
From Honiley the squadron continued to fly operational patrols with 255's aircraft ranging as far as Watford and Ipswich, both well into No. 11 Group's territory. In September, the squadron ceased operational flying to take delivery of 18 new Beaufighter Mk VIs. On 13 November, the squadron moved to RAF Portreath in Cornwall, the first stop on the way to North Africa.

=== Algeria and Tunisia ===
The final destination was Maison Blanche in Algeria. The squadron's Beaufighters arrived on 15 November 1942, while the groundcrew, following by troopship, arrived in December 1942. The aircrews were in action almost immediately on arrival, without waiting for their ground crews. As a security measure, the radar sets had been removed from the Beaufighters before being sent to Africa which made the squadron's attempts to defend against German night bomber attacks ineffective. A German air-raid on the night of 20/21 November caused the loss of five Beaufighters on the ground, along with the aircraft of several other squadrons. In response, radar sets were sent out to equip the squadron's aircraft and GCI control was set up.

The first of the new Beaufighters arrived from England on 2 December 1942, followed by the much-needed AI sets which arrived two days later. A change of tactics was introduced from 5 December. These were described as follows:

"Order received for three crews to go to our most forward aerodrome in Tunisia, Souk-el-Arba. The idea of working a night fighter squadron so close to the front is a novel one, the tradition being a restriction of its activities to home defence. The more courageous policy adopted by the powers-that-be in this particular instance may well become an eye-opener to the hitherto unexplored possibilities of night fighters being used so close to the front in direct support for our attacking forces."

The adjacent village has, since 1966, been known as Jendouba. By the end of hostilities in North Africa, there were two airfields at Souk-el-Arba. The original (as used by No. 255 Squadron) was located immediately to the south-east of the town and was captured by paratroops of the British 1st Parachute Brigade on 16 November 1942. A second airfield was constructed later by US military engineers about 4 km (2.5 mi) to the south-west of the town, and used primarily by bombers.

Numerous skirmishes between the squadron's Beaufighters and bombers and fighter-bombers of both the Luftwaffe and the Regia Aeronautica continued throughout the month. At 13:00 on 26 December, an Axis air raid on the airfield resulted in the death of an airman who was killed by shrapnel, the second victim of bombing raids on the squadron's airfields in North Africa. Two Beaufighters were destroyed in the same raid and a further two damaged.

The very end of February marked the commencement of a technical problem that took a while to resolve. Unannounced, replacement Beaufighters arrived equipped with the new and somewhat hastily produced Mk.VII AI sets. These were, in essence, pre-production versions of the Mk.VIII radar. The new equipment functioned in a very different way to the Mk.IV, using 9.1 centimetre (3 GHz) microwave signals rather than the 1.5 metre (193 MHz) VHF signals of the older equipment. Not only did the Mk.VII sets require somewhat different display interpretation by the Navigators, but the change also affected tactics because they could be operated much closer to the ground than the old sets. Re-training in the field was necessary.

Problematically, there were IFF incompatibilities that threatened to label friendly aircraft as foe for want of an IFF signal showing otherwise. The risk of mis-identification of targets and consequent friendly fire casualties rose significantly. Until the squadron was completely re-equipped with new aircraft using only centimetric radar, it was necessary to ensure that all fighter aircraft in the air at any one time had either VHF or S-Band equipment – never a mixture. The S-Band equipped Beaufighters were unable to make use of the VHF Radar Beacons. The changeover was not completed until August 1943, just prior to the squadron's departure to Sicily.

On 21 March 1943, seven aircrews relocated to Bône in readiness for intruder operations over Sardinia. This marked a significant extension of the squadron's role; they were no longer just being used for defensive work, but were also carrying the fight into enemy airspace. The first such intruder operation took place on the night of 23/24 March 1943. On 6 April 1943, the squadron moved out of Macdonald to a new campsite at nearby Aïn Arnat, because of concerns about malaria.

On 13 April 1943, the commanding officer received an urgent daytime request to intercept any Axis torpedo bombers that might fly west of Sardinia to try and attack a major Allied naval convoy bound for Algiers. He sent up three successive sections each consisting of three Beaufighters, each section in turn relieving the previous section, to give continuous cover from approx 15:00 until dusk. The first section finished its patrol before any enemy aircraft showed up, but the second and third sections intercepted a total of 12 torpedo bombers including Ju.88s, He 111s and at least one Do.217, all on their way to attack the convoy. The squadron's claim was one Do.217 destroyed, one Ju.88 destroyed and another probably destroyed, two further Ju.88s and two He 111s damaged. The primary objective of protecting the convoy was fully achieved; the remaining enemy aircraft all dropped their torpedoes, scattered and fled without ever coming within range of their target. One Beaufighter was hit by enemy fire and was lost, with both crew members.

Hostilities in North Africa ceased on 13 May 1943. Over the course of the rest of the month the squadron consolidated at La Sebala II, mounting only defensive patrols against Axis bombers operating out of Sicily. These patrols were from Paddington (Note: Paddington was one of six airfields or landing grounds around Souk El Khemis all named after London railway stations) up until the 21st of the month, from La Sebala exclusively for the next week and from both La Sebala and Monastir from 28 May 1943.

Such defensive patrols continued throughout June, but the squadron did not engage in aggressive activity. On 17 June the squadron paraded at La Sebala I for a visit by H.M. the King. During the proceedings the squadron CO, Wing Commander Player, was presented to His Majesty. Towards the end of the month, much activity took place regarding Mk.VIII radar equipment when on 3 July two new Beaufighters arrived pre-fitted with Mk.VIII AI, beginning a complete re-equipment of the squadron.

=== Italy and disbandment ===
The Allied invasion of Sicily began on 9/10 July. No. 255 Squadron received the order to move to Sicily during the evening of 9 August and on 10 July a motor convoy took 2 officers and 160 men to a staging camp. The following day this group moved to the docks at La Goulette, then travelling to Sicily by sea in Landing Ships, Tanks (LSTs) which sailed on 14 July. The rest of the squadron followed by air on 17 July, travelling in fifteen Douglas Dakotas and the new Beaufighters. A base was set up at Bo Rizzo and the squadron reverted to a near-exclusive night air defence role for a time.

After this, the squadron was deployed to Italy, operating from Grottaglie from November 1943. This resulted in numerous detachments and a major series of fighter-intruder and fighter-bomber missions. Some were in support of Yugoslav Partisans in the Balkans, some flew on into the Danube basin with the objective of destroying oil barges supplying fuel to Germany from the Romanian oil fields and some, during the autumn of 1944, headed south-east over the southern Aegean Sea with the objective of harassing the Wehrmacht's retreat from the Dodecanese Campaign. The squadron provided air cover for Allied ground troops in the vicinity of the Battle of Ancona, Italy, where a number of Ju 87 Stuka dive bombers operating without fighter escort were shot down by the squadron.

The squadron operated from Foggia Main and in February 1945 it moved to Rosignamo and started to re-equip with the Mosquito XIX. From Italy it operated night intruder missions against transport aircraft. At the end of the war in Europe it was the sole night-fighter squadron covering most of Italian airspace. The squadron moved from Italy to RAF Hal Far, Malta, in September 1945 and to RAF Gianaclis (now Jiyanklis Air Base) in Egypt in January 1946. The squadron was officially disbanded at RAF Gianaclis on 30 April 1946.

== Badge and motto ==
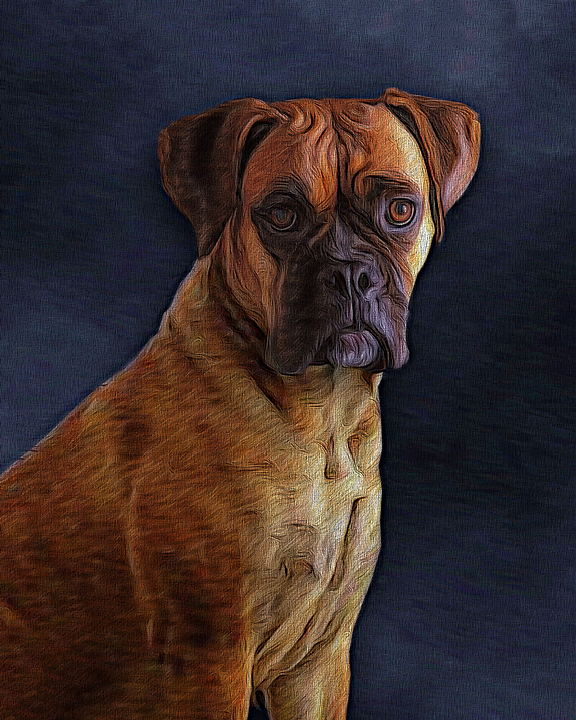
Artist's impression of Bruce, based on a photograph that appeared in the morning edition of the Birmingham Post, 12 August 1942.

There is no known record of the squadron having either a badge or a motto during the First World War. In 1943, a badge was approved which consisted of a "Panther's face" along with the motto Ad Auroram, (Latin: To the break of dawn).

== Mascot ==
For much of 1942, the Squadron's mascot was a Bull Mastiff dog called Bruce. Bruce was originally owned by Pilot Officer Michael John Mortimer, who was killed on 15 January 1942. His brother the Rev. J.L. Mortimer, who attended the funeral, gave the dog to Wing Commander Kelly, as Squadron mascot. When the squadron moved to North Africa in November 1942 the dog was taken on by 488 Squadron RNZAF.

== Aircraft operated ==
Aircraft operated by No. 255 Squadron, with details of usage, fitting of Pip-Squeak, Airborne Interception Radar and IFF
From	To	Aircraft	Variant	Role	Pip-Squeak	AI Radar	IFF
Jul 1918	Jan 1919	Airco DH.6	–	Patrol	None	None	None
Nov 1940	Sep 1941	Boulton Paul Defiant	I	Combat	Transitional	No	Transitional
Mar 1941	Aug 1941	Hawker Hurricane	I	Combat	No	No	Yes
Jun 1941	?	Bristol Blenheim	I	Training	?	No	?
Jul 1941	May 1942	Bristol Beaufighter	II F	Combat	No	Mk.IV	Yes
Jan 1942	Apr 1942	Miles Magister	–	Transport	No	No	?
Mar 1942	Aug 1943	Bristol Beaufighter	VI F	Combat	No	Mk.IV	Yes
Apr 1942	Nov 1942	Miles Master	?	Transport	No	No	?
Feb 1943	Aug 1943	Bristol Beaufighter	VI F	Combat	No	Mk.VII	Yes
Jul 1943	Feb 1945	Bristol Beaufighter	VI F	Combat	No	Mk.VIII	Mk.III.G
Circa...	Jan 1945	Hawker Hurricane	II C	Transport	No	No	Yes
Jan 1945	Jan 1946	de Havilland Mosquito	XIX	Combat	No	Mk.X	Yes
Jan 1946	Apr 1946	de Havilland Mosquito	XXX	Combat	No	Mk.X	Yes

Pip-Squeak was removed and IFF installed as part of the change-over from HF to VHF radios. Hence the entries "Transitional" above. The whole Pip-Squeak system was obsolescent by 1941.
All AI equipment was removed from the Squadron's aircraft in November 1942, before travel to Africa. Some was re-installed later the same month in Algeria and the remainder in December 1942.
New aircraft equipped with Mk.VIII AI started arriving 3 July 1943 at La Sebala II. The change-over continued until about 5 August.
Mosquito XIX aircraft were not normally fitted with Mk.X AI; this is a rare example.
