= Henry Davidson (RAF officer) =

British World War II flying ace

- Born: 11 July 1915; Stretford, England
- Died: 6 October 1942 (aged 27); Calveley, England
- Military career
- Allegiance: United Kingdom
- Branch: Royal Air Force
- Service years: 1939–1942
- Rank: Flying Officer
- Units: No. 249 Squadron; Merchant Ship Fighter Unit
- Conflicts: Second World War: Battle of Britain; Battle of the Atlantic

Henry Davidson (11 July 1915 – 6 October 1942) was a Royal Air Force (RAF) fighter pilot and flying ace of the Second World War. He is credited with destroying at least seven aircraft and was the first pilot of the RAF's Merchant Ship Fighter Unit (MSFU).

From Stretford, Davidson was a member of the Royal Air Force Volunteer Reserve when he was called up to serve in the RAF on the outbreak of the Second World War. Once his training was completed in June 1940 he was posted to No. 249 Squadron. He flew Hawker Hurricane fighters during the Battle of Britain, claiming a number of aerial victories. The following year he was sent to the MSFU and made the first catapult assisted take off of a Hurricane from the CAM ship Empire Rainbow. He saw no action during his time with the MSFU. He later flew with No. 285 Squadron and was killed in a flying accident on 6 October 1942.

== Early life ==
Henry John Davidson was born in Stretford, near Manchester, England, on 11 July 1915. Educated at Stretford Grammar School, he took up an apprenticeship at Metropolitan Vickers and later worked as an electrical engineer. He enlisted in the Royal Air Force Volunteer Reserve in 1938 and trained as a pilot at No. 17 Elementary and Reserve Flying Training School at Barton Aerodrome.

== Second World War ==
Called up for service with the Royal Air Force (RAF) on the outbreak of war, Davidson trained at No. 2 Flying Training School at Brize Norton. Once this was completed in mid-May 1940, he attended a course on Hawker Hurricane fighters at No. 5 Operational Training Unit at Aston Down. He was posted to No. 249 Squadron on 9 June. Based at Leconfield, the squadron had only just become operational with Hurricanes and in August it moved south to Boscombe Down.

=== Battle of Britain ===
On 7 August, Davidson destroyed a Dornier Do 17 medium bomber to the southeast of Gravesend. On 15 August, he shared in the destruction of a Messerschmitt Bf 110 heavy fighter in the vicinity of Ringwood. On 2 September he shot down another Bf 110, this time over Sutton Valence, sharing the credit with another pilot. Three days later he engaged a Messerschmitt Bf 109 near Sheerness and was credited with its probable destruction. The Luftwaffe mounted its largest bombing raid to date on London on 7 September and during the course of the day Davidson destroyed a Do 17 to the south of Gravesend, and damaged a Bf 109. On 27 September he shared in the destruction of a Bf 110 near Redhill and shot down a Junkers Ju 88 medium bomber south of London. The next month, on 29 October, he destroyed a Bf 109 in the vicinity of North Weald.

By this time, the Luftwaffe had reduced its operations and the squadron was mostly engaged in patrolling duties. By early 1941 it had switched to offensive sorties, escorting RAF bombers to targets in German-occupied Europe. Davidson was commissioned as a pilot officer in March.

=== Merchant Ship Fighter Unit ===
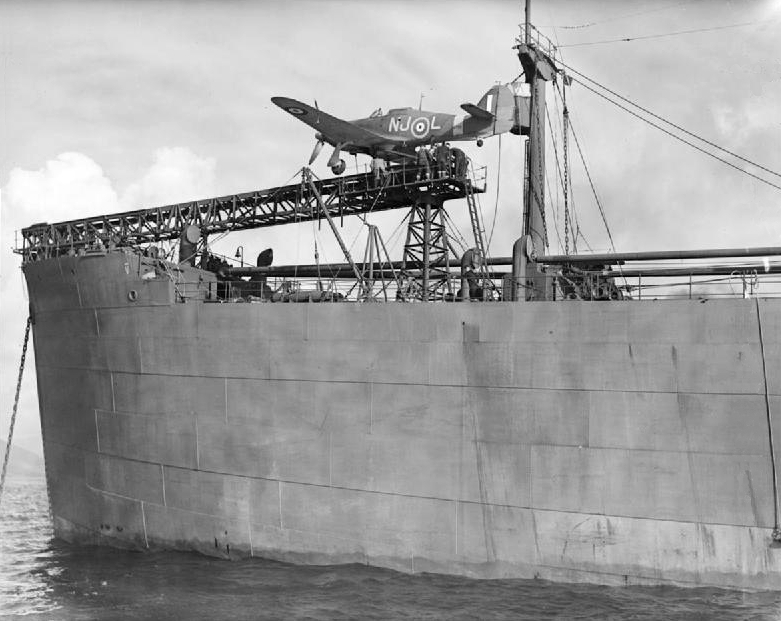
A Hawker Hurricane fighter mounted to the catapult of a CAM ship at Greenock, 1941

In May, Davidson volunteered for the newly formed Merchant Ship Fighter Unit (MSFU), which was based at Speke. The MSFU operated Hurricanes, launched with the assistance of wing mounted rockets from a catapult structure mounted to the deck of a merchant ship; vessels equipped in this manner were known as CAM ships. Travelling as part of convoys crossing the Atlantic, the Hurricanes provided some aerial protection from the Luftwaffe's long range maritime reconnaissance aircraft. Once launched there was no way for the Hurricane to land so the pilot had to ditch close by the convoy and hope to be picked up.

Davidson was the MSFU's first pilot and on 31 May embarked on the Empire Rainbow, the first CAM ship, at Greenock. While it was steaming along the River Clyde, he made the first practice launch of a Hurricane from a CAM ship that was underway. When his aircraft was launched, not only did two of the thirteen rockets provided to the catapult's trolley, which bore the Hurricane, fail to ignite, under the pressure of the moment Davidson neglected to properly operate the flaps. He nearly crashed into the river as the Hurricane's port wing made contact with the water surface. Despite this he was able to safely land at Abbotsinch. On investigation, it was decided by the RAF staff officers supervising the trial that Davidson's performance should not be held against him.

The Empire Rainbow, with Davidson as the pilot of its Hurricane, made the first voyage for a CAM ship, which began on 8 June, joining a convoy for bound for Halifax, Nova Scotia. It proved to be uneventful. Davidson went to make further voyages as a MSFU pilot, of which there were nearly 40 by September. Despite the rough sea conditions to which the Hurricanes were subjected to as a result being in an exposed position on the deck of the ship, Davidson noted that in his experience, this did not affect the mechanical reliability of the aircraft.

=== Later war service ===
Promoted to flying officer in March 1942, later in the year Davidson was assigned to No. 285 Squadron. This was based at Wrexham and operated Airspeed Oxfords and Boulton Paul Defiants on target towing duties for anti-aircraft gunners. On 6 October he was flying a Defiant when it went out of control and crashed near Calveley. Davidson was killed. His body was cremated at the Manchester Crematorium, where he is commemorated.

At the time of his death, Davidson was credited with having shot down seven aircraft, three of which being shared with other pilots, and damaging one other. He is also credited with the probable destruction of one aircraft.
