= Francis Soper =

British flying ace of WWII

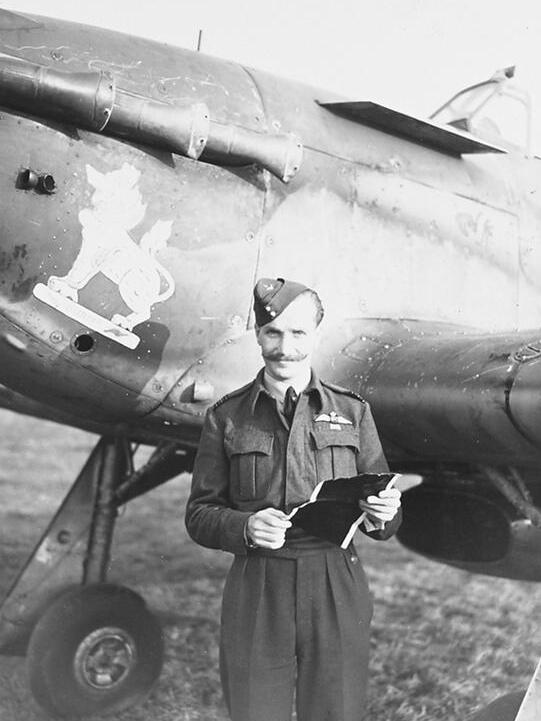
- Born: 29 July 1912; Devonport, United Kingdom
- Died: 5 October 1941 (aged 29) off the Suffolk coast, North Sea
- Military career
- Allegiance: United Kingdom
- Branch: Royal Air Force
- Rank: Squadron Leader
- Unit: No. 1 Squadron
- Commands: No. 257 Squadron
- Conflicts: Second World War: Phoney War; Battle of France
- Awards: Distinguished Flying Cross; Distinguished Flying Medal

Francis Soper DFC, DFM (29 July 1912 – 5 October 1941) was a flying ace of the Royal Air Force (RAF) during the Second World War. He is credited with the destruction of at least fourteen aircraft.

From Devonport in England, Soper was a sergeant pilot with No. 1 Squadron at the time of the outbreak of the Second World War. Sent to France early in the Phoney War, he achieved considerable success in the aerial fighting once the Battle of France commenced in May 1940. Repatriated from the country after several days of intensive operations, Soper was subsequently awarded the Distinguished Flying Medal and commissioned. He spent the next several months on instructing duties before returning to operations with a posting as a flight commander with No. 257 Squadron in June 1941. After claiming more aerial victories with the squadron, he became its commander in September. He is believed to have been killed on 5 October as he failed to return from a sortie that day. Two days after his presumed death, he was awarded the Distinguished Flying Cross.

== Early life ==
Francis Joseph Soper was born at Devonport, England, on 29 July 1912, the son of John and Minnie Soper. He joined the Royal Air Force as an Halton aircraft apprentice in the prewar period but by the time of the outbreak of the Second World War in early September 1939, was a sergeant pilot with No. 1 Squadron.

== Second World War ==
No. 1 Squadron was equipped with the Hawker Hurricane fighter and stationed at Tangmere at the commencement of hostilities. It was promptly deployed to France as part of the Advanced Air Striking Force. By October it was operating from Vassincourt Airfield and patrolling the French-German border, occasionally engaging the Luftwaffe. On 23 November, Soper combined with two other pilots of his squadron, Pilot Officers Cyril Palmer and John Kilmartin, to shoot down a Dornier Do 17 medium bomber near Châlons-sur-Marne. The German pilot survived the engagement and was subsequently hosted by the squadron to dinner before being sent to a prisoner-of-war facility.

The winter months affected the squadron's ability to regularly patrol the frontier, with snow often blanketing its airfield. It was not until the weather improved in March 1940 that the pace of operations increased. On 2 March Soper and another pilot engaged a Do 17 to the north of Belmont. While no definitive claim was made at the time, the German bomber crashed in France so was subsequently confirmed as destroyed. The next day Soper shared in the destruction of a Heinkel He 111 medium bomber to the southeast of Étain.

=== Battle of France ===
When the German invasion of France commenced on 10 May, No. 1 Squadron was immediately heavily engaged. On the day of the invasion itself, Soper shared in the destruction of a Do 17 near Longuyon. The next day, he shot down a pair of Messerschmitt Bf 110 heavy fighters in the vicinity of Mézières. On 12 May, he shot down one Messerschmitt Bf 109 fighter, and shared in the destruction of a second, over Maastricht. The latter claim was not confirmed. He destroyed another Bf 109 on 14 May and three days later shot down two Bf 110s close to Voizieres. On a sortie to the northeast of Rethel on 19 May he shot down two He 111s and damaged a third.

By this time, the British forces in France were in retreat, with No. 1 Squadron repeatedly shifting from airfield to airfield. Its longest serving pilots, which included Soper, were exhausted and they were repatriated back to the United Kingdom. The remainder of the squadron, replenished with reinforcements, ended up at Nantes airfield. Its flying personnel were eventually evacuated to England on 18 June. By this time Soper held the rank of flight sergeant. He was well known for his large mustache, and this accounted for his nickname of Marshal Budenny, after the impressively mustachioed Russian cavalryman. In recognition of his successes in France, Soper was awarded the Distinguished Flying Medal in July.

=== Later war service ===
Soper missed the Battle of Britain on account of being commissioned as a pilot officer and assigned to instructing duties at an Operational Training Unit. In June 1941 he returned to operations with a posting to No. 257 Squadron as a flight commander. His new unit, based at Coltishall, was equipped with Hurricanes and engaged both in offensive operations over the North Sea towards the Dutch coast and night fighter duties. On the night of 8 July, Soper was flying a nighttime interception when he shot down a Junkers Ju 88 medium bomber to the northeast of Cromer.

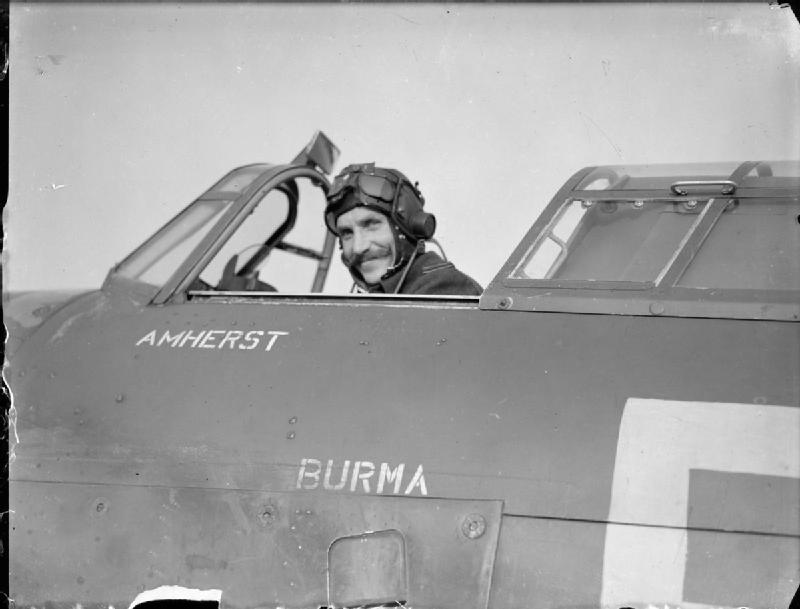
Soper in the cockpit of his Hurricane fighter at Coltishall, September 1941

On 12 September Soper damaged a Bf 109 off the English coast from Coltishall and three days later he destroyed a Ju 88 to the east of Happisburgh. He became commander of No. 257 Squadron at some point during the month, with the rank of acting squadron leader. On 5 October flying with another pilot, he damaged a Ju 88 off the Suffolk coast but his Hurricane may have received return fire during the engagement. He failed to return to Coltishall and is presumed to have been killed. Two days later, Soper's award of the Distinguished Flying Cross was announced. The citation, published in The London Gazette, read:

This officer has displayed the utmost keenness and determination to destroy the enemy. In September, 1941, whilst patrolling over a convoy at dusk, Squadron Leader Soper observed a Junkers 88 diving to attack the convoy. The vessels opened up with considerable anti-aircraft fire. Despite this, Squadron Leader Soper closed in on the attacker and, flying through the barrage, pressed home his attack with the utmost determination, until the enemy aircraft went down into the sea. Squadron Leader Soper has now destroyed fourteen enemy aircraft of which two have been destroyed at night.

— London Gazette, No. 35297, 7 October 1941

With no known grave, Soper is commemorated on the Runneymeade Memorial at Englefield Green. He is credited with the shooting down of fourteen aircraft, four of which were shared with other pilots, as well as a share in one unconfirmed destroyed aircraft. He also damaged three aircraft, one of these shared with another pilot.
