= No. 535 Squadron RAF =

- Active: 2 Sep 1942 – 25 Jan 1943
- Country: United Kingdom
- Branch: Royal Air Force
- Role: Turbinlite nightfighter squadron
- Part of: No. 9 Group RAF, Fighter Command

No. 535 Squadron RAF was one of the ten Turbinlite nightfighter squadrons of the Royal Air Force during the Second World War.

== History ==
No. 535 Squadron was formed at RAF High Ercall, Shropshire on 2 September 1942, from No. 1456 (Turbinlite) Flight, as part of No. 9 Group RAF in Fighter Command. Instead of operating only Turbinlite and -rudimentary- Airborne Intercept (AI) radar equipped aircraft (Havocs and Bostons) and working together with a normal nightfighter unit, such as in their case No. 257 Squadron RAF while still 1456 Flight, the unit now also flew with their own Hawker Hurricanes. It was disbanded at High Ercall on 25 January 1943, when Turbinlite squadrons were, due to lack of success on their part and the rapid development of AI radar, thought to be superfluous.

== Aircraft operated ==
Aircraft operated by No. 535 Squadron RAF, data from
From	To	Aircraft	Version
2 September 1942	25 January 1943	Douglas Havoc	Mk.I (Turbinlite)
2 September 1942	25 January 1943	Douglas Havoc	Mk.II (Turbinlite)
2 September 1942	25 January 1943	Douglas Boston	Mk.III (Turbinlite)
2 September 1942	25 January 1943	Hawker Hurricane	Mk.IIc

== Squadron bases ==
Bases and airfields used by No. 535 Squadron RAF, data from
From	To	Base
2 September 1942	25 January 1943	RAF High Ercall, Shropshire

== Commanding officers ==
Officers commanding No. 535 Squadron RAF, data from
From	To	Name
2 September 1942	25 January 1943	S/Ldr. B.H. Moloney
