= RAF High Ercall =

Former Royal Air Force station in Shropshire, England

RAF High Ercall USAAF Station AAF-346
- High Ercall, Shropshire in England
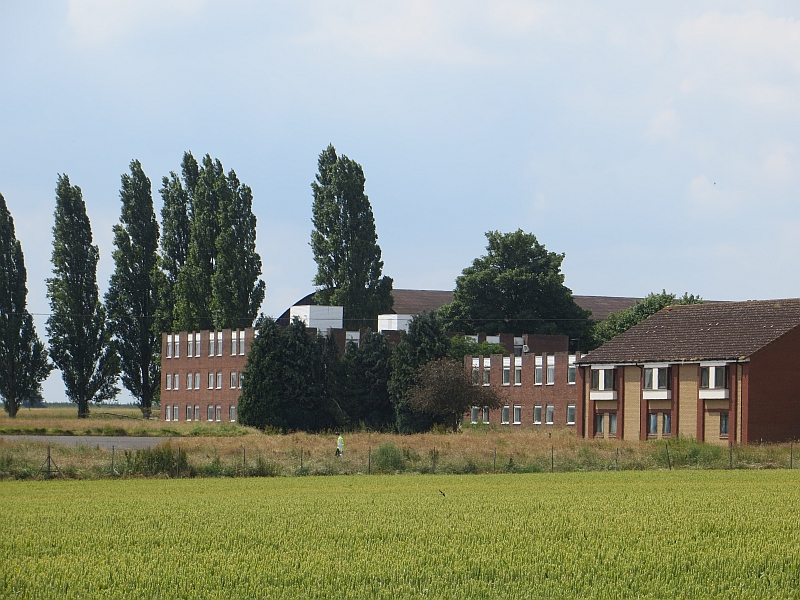

Site information
- Type: Royal Air Force station parent station 1941-43 sector station 1943-45
- Code: HC
- Owner: Air Ministry
- Operator: Royal Air Force
- Controlled by: RAF Fighter Command 1941-45; No. 9 Group RAF * No. 81 (OTU) Group RAF; RAF Maintenance Command 1945-62

Location
- Shown within Shropshire RAF High Ercall (the United Kingdom)
- Coordinates: 52.763°N 2.590°W

Site history
- Built: 1938/41
- Built by: G. Walker & Slater Ltd
- In use: April 1941 - February 1962
- Battles/wars: European theatre of World War II

Airfield information
- Elevation: 67 metres (220 ft) AMSL
Runways
Direction	Length and surface
00/00	Concrete
00/00	Concrete
00/00	Concrete

Royal Air Force High Ercall or more simply RAF High Ercall is a former Royal Air Force sector station situated near the village of High Ercall, 7 miles (11 km) northeast of Shrewsbury, Shropshire, England.

== History ==
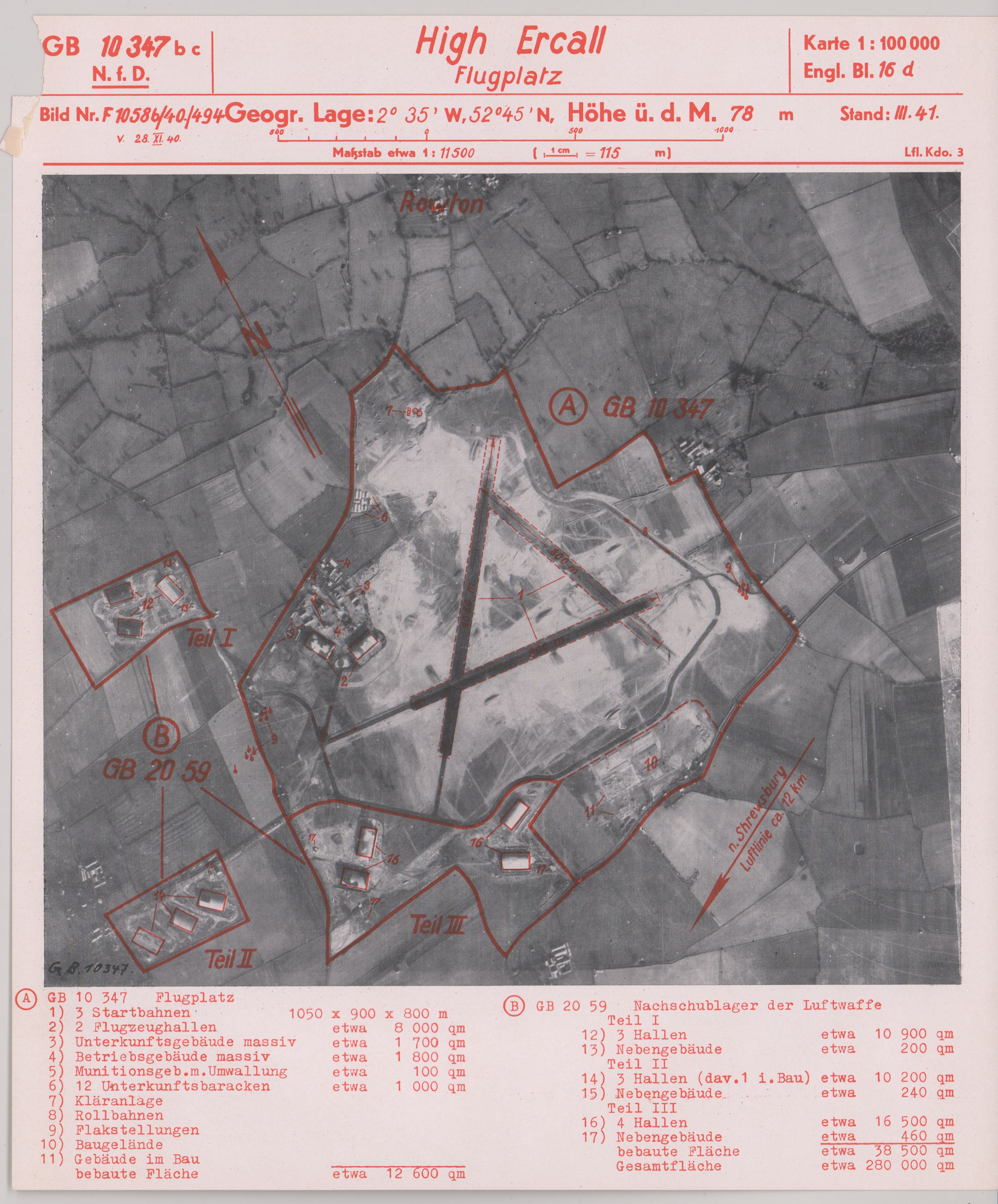
RAF High Ercall on a target dossier of the German Luftwaffe, 1941

Construction of the airfield began in 1938 and was mostly complete by 1940. The airbase was initially run by RAF Maintenance Command and civilians from the Ministry of Aircraft Production also worked at the airfield. From 1941 onward the airbase was taken over by RAF Fighter Command, and was used mainly by night fighter units, such as No. 68 Squadron and No. 255 Squadron. From 1942 the airfield was also used by the United States Army 8th Air Force's 309 Fighter Squadron, which flew British Supermarine Spitfires with USAAF markings. In 1943 the role of the airbase changed to become focused on training; it was used mainly by No. 60 Operational Training Unit for this purpose.

From 1951 the station became a Relief Landing Ground for flying and navigation training. If pilots were unable to land at their main base they could divert to High Ercall. The Station fulfilled this role from March 1951 for No. 6 Flying Training School RAF, and from 1957 for the Central Navigation and Control School which was based at RAF Shawbury.

=== Squadrons ===
- No. 41 Squadron RAF
- No. 68 Squadron RAF
- No. 247 Squadron RAF
- No. 255 Squadron RAF
- No. 257 Squadron RAF
- No. 285 Squadron RAF
- No. 535 Squadron RAF

=== Other units ===
- No. 3 Aircraft Delivery Flight RAF.
- No. 60 Operational Training Unit RAF was reformed here in May 1943 to train intruder crews using the de Havilland Mosquito.
- No. 1456 (Fighter) Flight RAF
- No. 29 Maintenance Unit RAF (MU)
- No. 99 Maintenance Unit RAF
- No. 222 Maintenance Unit RAF
- No. 236 Maintenance Unit RAF
- No. 6 Flying Training School RAF
- 27th Fighter Squadron (USAAF)
- 92d Fighter Squadron (USAAF)
- 309th Fighter Squadron
- 810 Naval Air Squadron
- No. 1489 (Fighter) Gunnery Flight RAF

== Post-military use ==
In 1946, a Handley Page Halifax bomber at High Ercall was purchased by Australian pilot Geoff Wikner who used the plane to fly home. Wikner also charged a number of passengers to embark on the flight with him. This marked the first post-war commercial flight between the United Kingdom and Australia.

The airbase closed in the early 1960s.

Between the 1960s and 1990s, the site was the Multi-Occupational Training and Education Centre (MOTEC) which provided training for workers including HGV drivers and mechanics and hosted the RTITB National Junior Mechanic Competition 1987.

The majority of the runways have been removed leaving only small tracks however nine hangars still are present spread out over the site and near a local village. A local Wartime Aircraft Recovery Group also occupies a section of the site.

In 2002 it was proposed to build a centre for asylum seekers on the site.

In 2014 the site was sold to the Greenhous Group who later successfully applied to the council to store new cars there before they were sold on the UK market.

== See also ==
- List of former Royal Air Force stations
