= No. 1456 Flight RAF =

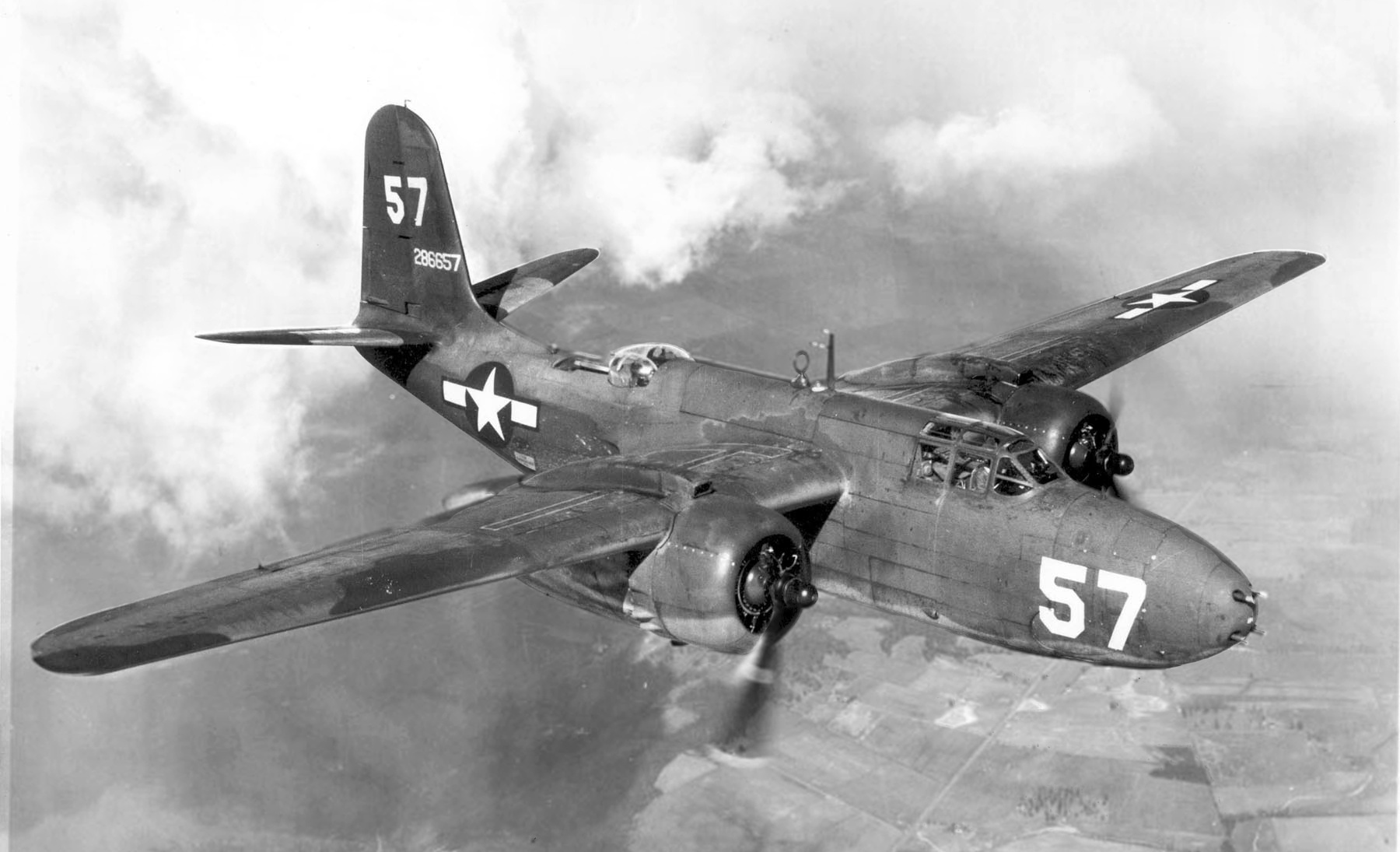
- An A-20 Havoc of the USAAF, like the ones used by the flight
- Active: 24 Nov 1941 – 2 Sep 1942
- Country: United Kingdom
- Branch: Royal Air Force
- Role: Night Fighter (Turbinlite)
- Part of: No. 9 Group RAF, Fighter Command

Insignia
- Squadron Badge heraldry: No known badge
- Squadron Codes: No known identification code for the flight is known to have been carried

No. 1456 (Fighter) Flight was formed at RAF Honiley, Warwickshire on 24 November 1941, equipped with Turbinlite Douglas Boston and Douglas Havoc aircraft. On operations they cooperated with the Hawker Hurricanes of 257 Squadron. The flight was replaced with 535 Squadron on 2 September 1942 but officially disbanded as late as 25 January 1943.

535 Sqn, which had taken over men and machines, carried on flying the Turbinlite Bostons and Havocs till the system was abandoned on 25 January 1943, when Turbinlite squadrons were, due to lack of success on their part and the rapid development of AI radar, thought to be superfluous.

== Aircraft operated ==
Aircraft operated by no. 1457 Flight RAF, data from
From	To	Aircraft	Version
24 November 1941	8 September 1942	Douglas Havoc	Mk.I (Turbinlite)
24 November 1941	8 September 1942	Douglas Havoc	Mk.I
24 November 1941	8 September 1942	Douglas Havoc	Mk.II (Turbinlite)
24 November 1941	8 September 1942	Douglas Boston	Mk.II (Turbinlite)
24 November 1941	8 September 1942	Douglas Boston	Mk.III (Turbinlite)

== Flight bases ==
Bases and airfields used by no. 1456 Flight RAF, data from
From	To	Base
24 November 1941	June 1942	RAF Honiley, Warwickshire
June 1942	2 September 1942	RAF High Ercall, Shropshire

== Commanding officers ==
Officers commanding no. 1456 Flight RAF, data from
From	To	Name
24 November 1941	August 1942	S/Ldr. I.E. Chalmers-Watson, AFC
August 1942	2 September 1942	S/Ldr. B.H. Moloney
