= Merchant Ship Fighter Unit =

The Merchant Ship Fighter Unit (MSFU) was a Royal Air Force operational aircraft unit based at RAF Speke, in south Liverpool, now Liverpool John Lennon Airport during World War II. The role of the MSFU was to provide pilots, crews, support personnel and aircraft to operate from 35 merchant ships outfitted with a catapult on the bow, referred to as Catapult Aircraft Merchant ships (CAM ships), a stop-gap initiative to provide air support to convoys out of reach of land in the early part of the war when aircraft carriers were scarce. The aircraft operated by the MSFU were converted Mk1 Hawker Hurricanes that were near the end of their useful lives and were often Battle of Britain veterans. The alterations included catapult fixing points and the addition of a naval radio.

The MSFU was formed at Speke on 5 May 1941 and provided detachments to the CAM ships, each vessel being equipped with one Sea Hurricane plus an RAF pilot and support crew. The single catapult consisted of an eighty-five-foot rail, along which a trolley carrying a Hurricane (later Hurricats were used for this) would be propelled by a battery of three-inch rockets over a distance of sixty feet. Using thirty-degree wing flaps, a pilot could make a successful takeoff while losing minimal height. The MSFU's first pilot was Pilot Officer Henry Davidson, who made the first practice launch from the Empire Rainbow on 31 May.

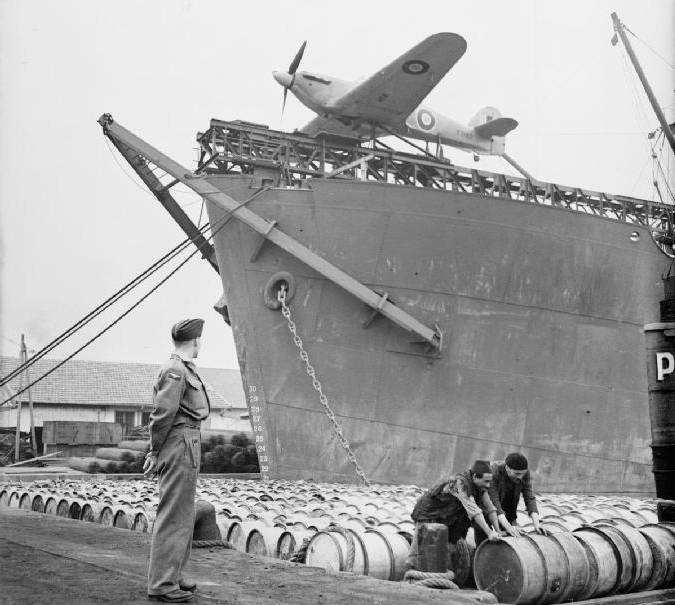
A Hawker Sea Hurricane Mark I, W9182, of the Merchant Ship Fighter Unit mounted on the fo'c'sle catapult of a Catapult Armed Merchantman (CAM ship)

Most notable was the inability of the CAM ship to recover the aircraft, and as a result launches out of reach of land were one way flights that required the pilot to bail out or ditch in the sea when the aircraft's fuel was exhausted. While every effort was made to pick up the pilot, operational factors such as the convoy being under U-boat attack could mean that a ship may not be detached to pick up the pilot. On the convoys to Russia the low sea temperatures meant that the pilot had a low potential survival rate unless picked up very soon after landing in the sea.

Eventually CAM ships were replaced beginning in 1943 with the introduction into service of escort carriers and the MSFU was disbanded on 8 June.

CAM fighters were credited with seven kills and their presence was rumoured to discourage the Focke-Wulf Fw 200 Condor aircraft from pressing home attacks on convoys.

== See also ==
- Merchant aircraft carrier
