= John Kilmartin (RAF officer) =

Irish flying ace of WWII

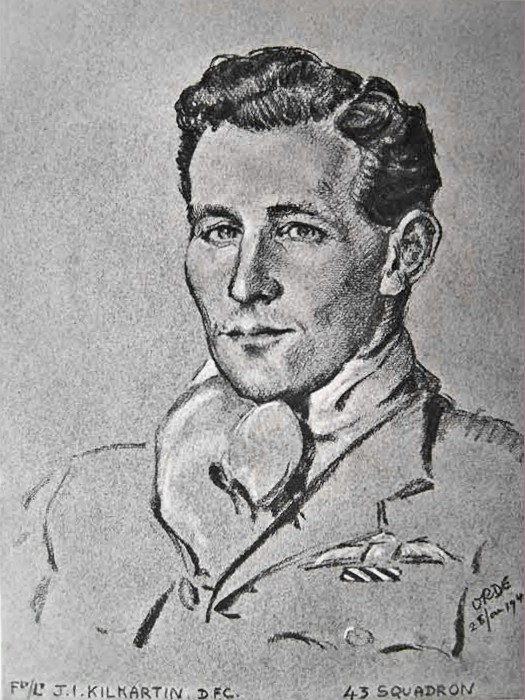
- Portrait of Kilmartin, made by the official war artist Cuthbert Orde in January 1941
- Born: 8 July 1913; Dundalk, Ireland
- Died: 1 October 1998 (aged 85); Devon, England
- Military career
- Allegiance: United Kingdom
- Branch: Royal Air Force
- Rank: Wing Commander
- Nickname: 'Killy'
- Commands: No. 128 Squadron (1942); No. 504 Squadron (1943); Hornchurch Wing (1943); No. 136 Wing (1944); No. 910 Wing (1945); No. 249 Squadron (1947–1948)
- Conflicts: Second World War: Battle of France; Battle of Britain
- Awards: Officer of the Order of the British Empire; Distinguished Flying Cross

Wing Commander John Kilmartin, OBE, DFC (8 July 1913 – 1 October 1998) was an Irish flying ace of the Royal Air Force (RAF) during the Second World War and the postwar period. He is credited with the destruction of at least fourteen aircraft.

From Dundalk, Kilmartin joined the RAF in 1936 and once his training was completed, he was posted to No. 43 Squadron. After the outbreak of the Second World War, Kilmartin joined No. 1 Squadron and was sent to France. Flying Hawker Hurricane fighters, he claimed several aerial victories during the Battle of France. After the campaign in France, he briefly served as an instructor before rejoining No. 43 Squadron and flying in the Battle of Britain. He achieved further victories in the fighting over England. In the later years of the war he held a series of squadron commands, and then was a wing leader. He was serving as a staff officer at the end of the war. Remaining in the RAF during the postwar period, he commanded No. 249 Squadron for a time before being appointed to staff roles for much of the remainder of his RAF career. Returning to civilian life in 1958, he became a chicken farmer. He retired to Devon and died there in 1998, aged 85.

== Early life ==
John Ignatius Kilmartin was born on 8 July 1913 at Dundalk, in Ireland. His father, a civil servant for the deputy commissioner for forestry, died when Kilmartin was nine years old. The family was impoverished as a result and Kilmartin was sent to Australia to be educated under a re-homing scheme. Once he completed his schooling he worked on cattle stations in New South Wales. In the early 1930s, he went to Shanghai in China, where he found employment as a clerk in a utilities company. In 1936 he applied for a short service commission in the Royal Air Force, was provisionally accepted and proceeded to the United Kingdom, via the Trans-Siberian Railway.

His initial flying training was undertaken at Perthshire in Scotland and in February 1937, Kilmartin, who was nicknamed 'Killy', passed to the next phase of training. After a period at No. 6 Flying Training School at Netheravon, he was posted to No. 43 Squadron in January 1938. This was based at Tangmere and operated the Hawker Fury biplane fighter but later in the year began to convert to the modern Hawker Hurricane fighter.

== Second World War ==
Shortly after the outbreak of the Second World War, Kilmartin was posted to No. 1 Squadron. Also equipped with Hurricanes, this had been deployed to France as part of the Advanced Air Striking Force. By October it was operating from Vassincourt and patrolling the French-German border, occasionally engaging the Luftwaffe. Kilmartin, now a flying officer, joined the squadron in November. He made his first claim, for a share in the destruction of a Dornier Do 17 medium bomber near Menchould, on 23 November. He shot down a Messerschmitt Bf 109 fighter on 2 April 1940, near Saint-Avold. A Junkers Ju 88 medium bomber was destroyed by Kilmartin near Châlons on 20 April.

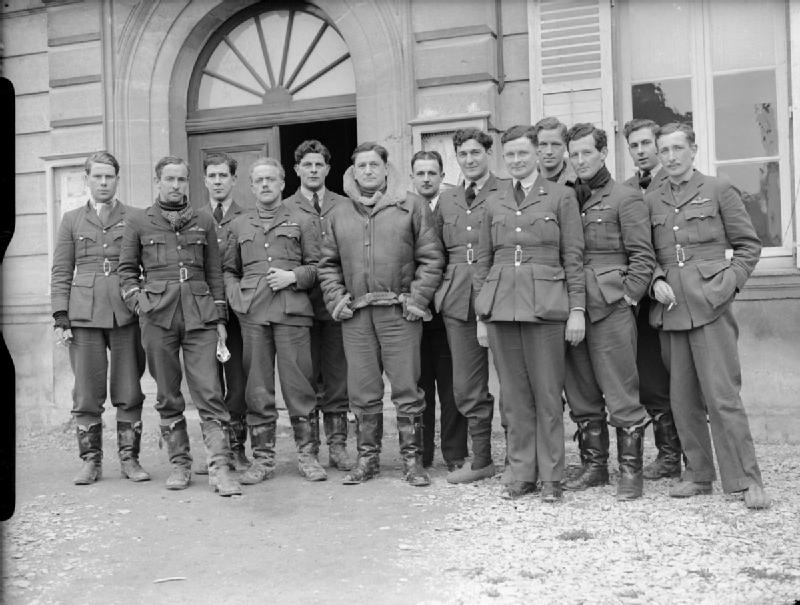
Pilots of No. 1 Squadron in France 1940; Kilmartin stands third right

=== Battle of France ===
When the German invasion of France commenced on 10 May, No. 1 Squadron was heavily engaged and over the following weeks began to retreat, repeatedly shifting from airfield to airfield. Kilmartin shared in the destruction of a Do 17 on the opening day of the invasion, and this was followed the next day by his shooting down of a pair of Messerschmitt Bf 110 heavy fighters to the northwest of Mézièrs. On 12 May he destroyed what he alleged was a Heinkel He 112 fighter over Maastricht but this was actually a Bf 109. Two days later he destroyed two Bf 109s near Sedan. On 15 May he may have shot down a Bf 110 although there is some uncertainty about this.

Kilmartin destroyed a Bf 110 on 16 May, and the next day shot down two more of this type, plus damaged a He 111. By this time the squadron's pilots were becoming exhausted and on 24 May, Kilmartin was returned to the United Kingdom. He was placed on instructing duties, based at No. 5 Operational Training Unit (OTU) at Aston Down where he remained until the end of August. Volunteering to return to operations, he was then assigned back to No. 43 Squadron where he was one of its flight commanders.

=== Battle of Britain ===
Operating from Tangmere, the squadron was heavily engaged in the Battle of Britain. Kilmartin destroyed a Bf 110 to the west of Dungeness on 6 September and then shot down a Bf 109 the following day. The squadron was withdrawn to the north for a rest on 8 September. Kilmartin's successes to date saw him awarded the Distinguished Flying Cross in October. The citation for his DFC, published in The London Gazette, read:

Flying Officer Kilmartin has destroyed twelve enemy aircraft. His dash and determination, with clear thinking, combine to make him a magnificent leader.

— London Gazette, No. 34964, 8 October 1940

=== Later war service ===
Promoted to flight lieutenant in November, Kilmartin was given command of No. 602 Squadron in April 1941 as an acting squadron leader. This was based at Prestwick in Scotland and, with its Supermarine Spitfire fighters, mostly carried out convoy patrols. His period leading the unit was brief for the next month he was posted to the newly formed No. 313 Squadron to help bring it up to operational status. Based at Catterick, this was staffed with Czech pilots and by the end of June it was patrolling the east coast. Later in the year Kilmartin was sent to West Africa on instructing duties and then in March 1942 took command of No. 128 Squadron. This was based in Sierra Leone and flew Hurricanes from Hastings but rarely encountered opposition in its patrols. He relinquished command in August and returned to the United Kingdom. His next posting was to No. 504 Squadron, where he was briefly a supernumerary before taking command in January 1943. Flying Spitfires from Ibsley, the squadron was mostly engaged in offensive sorties to German-occupied France.

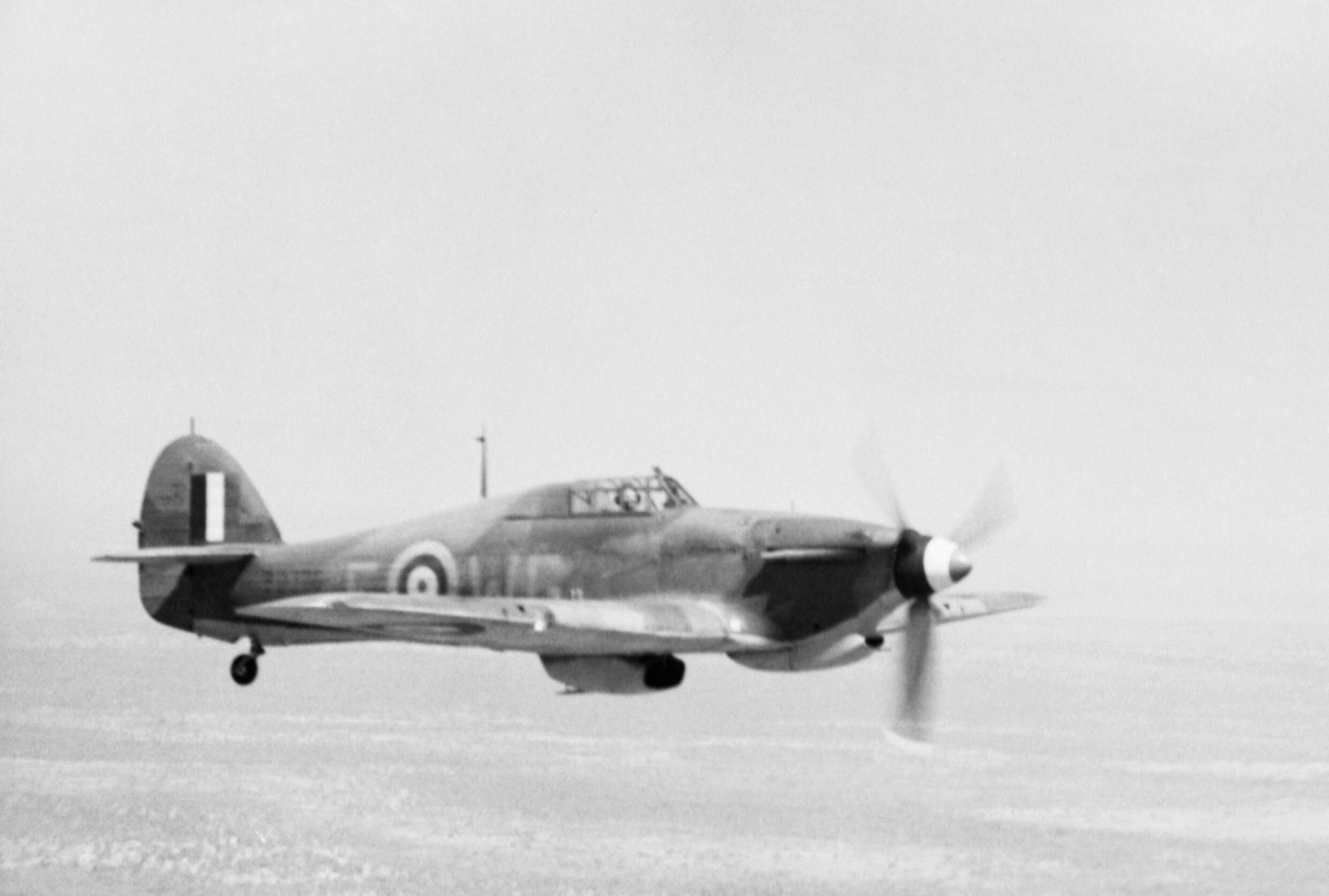
Kilmartin flying a Hurricane of No. 128 Squadron over Sierra Leone, 1942

Kilmartin was promoted to acting wing commander in late March, leading the Hornchurch Wing for the next two months. During this time his squadron leader rank was made substantive. In June he returned to No. 5 OTU for instructing duties before going to a staff post with No. 84 Group, part of the Second Tactical Air Force (2TAF). In 1944, he was appointed commander of No. 136 Wing, which operated Hawker Typhoon fighter-bombers on ground support operations in the run up to the invasion of Normandy. His command was disestablished in late June and Kilmartin resumed staff duties, this time at the headquarters of the 2TAF. He was appointed an Officer of the Order of the British Empire in the 1945 New Year Honours. Once the war in Europe ended, Kilmartin was posted to Burma to take command of No. 910 Wing. This was his final assignment of the war since three months later Japan surrendered.

== Postwar career ==
Kilmartin remained in the RAF in the postwar period, spending the period from late-1945 to mid-1946 in Indonesia as a staff officer in the Air Headquarters there. Returning to the United Kingdom, he then attended the Empire Flying School at Hullavington. In September 1946 No. 249 Squadron was reformed in Iraq with Hawker Tempest fighter-bombers and Kilmartin was appointed its commander, serving in this capacity for 18 months.

After a course at RAF Staff College at Bracknell, Kilmartin was posted to the Air Ministry where he served in a staff training role for several months. He was a staff officer at Wunstorf, in Germany, for a time before proceeding to a posting to Naples as an intelligence officer with the North Atlantic Treaty Organization's headquarters in southern Europe. After two years of service there he returned to the United Kingdom to take up an appointment as 'Wing Commander, Operations' at RAF Turnhouse. He went back to Germany in early 1957 to command a RAF station at Borgentreich for nearly 18 months. He retired from the RAF in July 1958.

== Later life ==
Returning to civilian life, he took up chicken farming in North Tawton, Devon. In the mid-1970s, by which time he had married, he sold his farm and spent the next several years travelling through Europe. In the mid-1980s he retired to Devon, where he died on 1 October 1998.

Kilmartin is credited with having destroyed fourteen, possibly fifteen, aircraft, two of which were shared with other pilots. He is also credited with damaging one aircraft.
