= RAF Wrexham =

Former Royal Air Force station in Wrexham

RAF Wrexham
- Borras, Wrexham County Borough in Wales
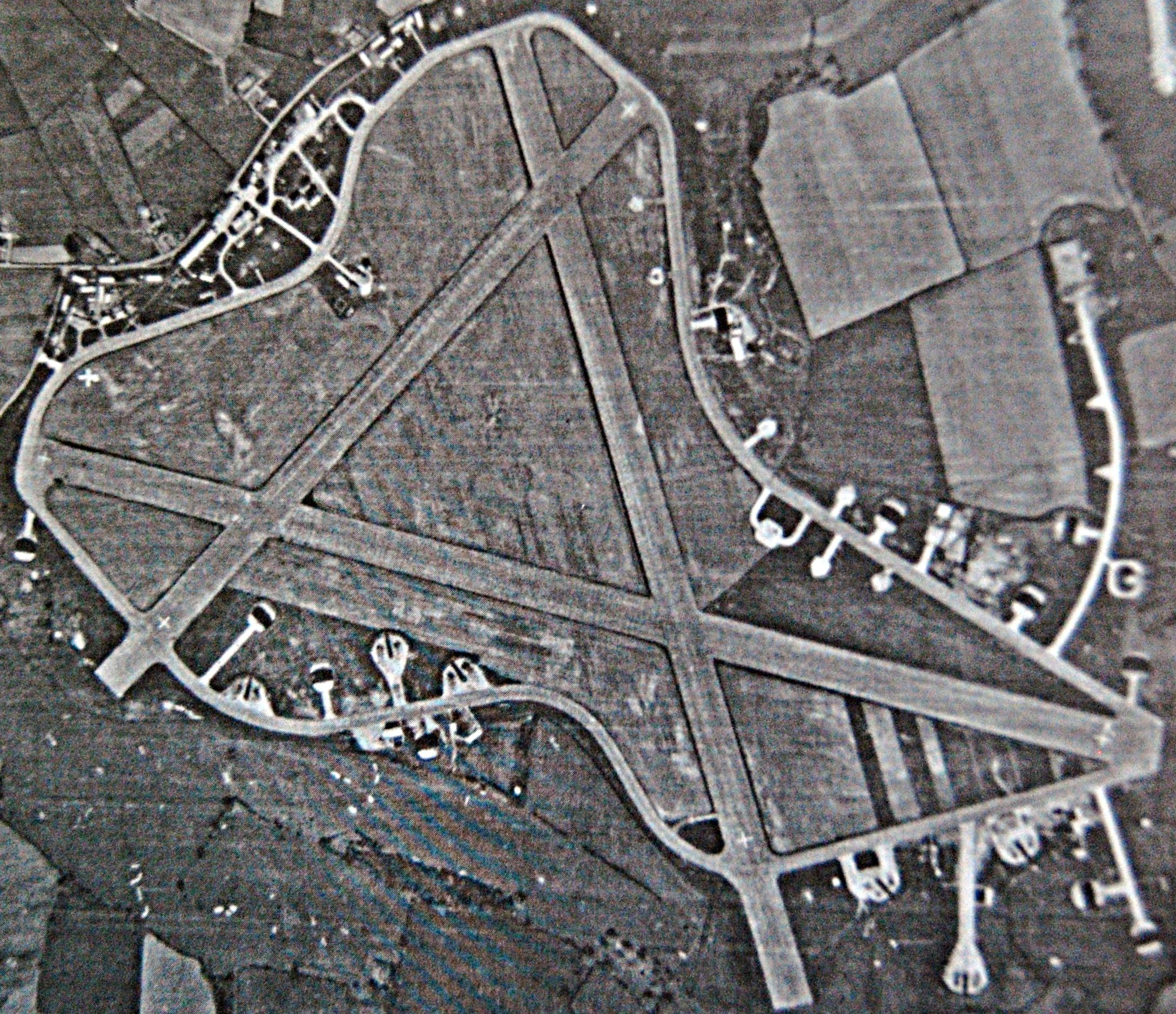

Site information
- Type: Royal Air Force station
- Code: RW
- Owner: Air Ministry
- Operator: Royal Air Force
- Controlled by: RAF Fighter Command 1941-43 * No. 9 Group RAF; RAF Flying Training Command * No. 21 Group RAF

Location
- Shown within Wrexham RAF Wrexham (the United Kingdom)
- Coordinates: 53°04′00″N 2°57′01″W

Site history
- Built: 1917 & 1940/41
- Built by: (1941) Sir Alfred McAlpine Ltd
- In use: 1917-1920; June 1941 - 1945
- Battles/wars: European theatre of World War II * Battle of Britain * Defence of Liverpool; Cold War

Airfield information
- Elevation: 67 metres (220 ft) AMSL
Runways
Direction	Length and surface
04/22	Concrete
09/27	Concrete
16/34	Concrete

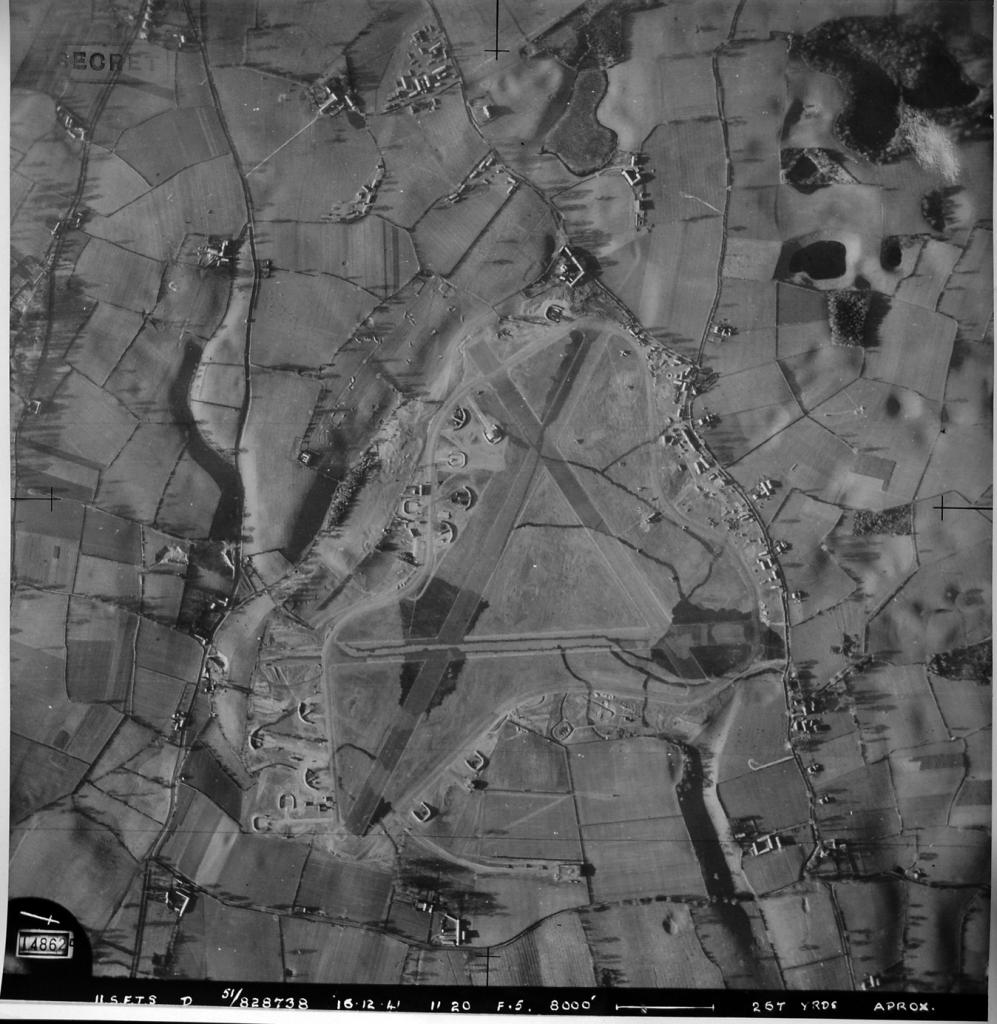
Aerial Reconnaissance photo taken by the Royal Air force Photo Reconnaissance Unit on 16 December 1941

Royal Air Force Wrexham, or more simply RAF Wrexham, is a former Royal Air Force station at Borras, on the outskirts of Wrexham, Wales and north-east of the city centre.

Initially opened as a municipal aerodrome the airfield was used by the Royal Flying Corps during the First World War and the Royal Air Force in the Second World War. The airfield became the site of a Royal Observer Corps nuclear bunker during the Cold War.

== History ==
=== Early days ===
The first noted involvement of aviation with Wrexham was in 1912 when Gustav Hamel visited the Racecourse Ground to entertain the public with air displays. The local council discussed transforming the racecourse into a municipal airport.

During the period 1917–1920 fields at Borras Lodge were used by Nos. 4 and 51 Training Squadrons/Schools of the Royal Flying Corps and after 1918 by Royal Air Force training squadrons based at RAF Shotwick (later RAF Sealand) and Hooton Park. The same location was also used by the Lancashire Aero Club and the Liverpool and District Aero Club for air displays during the 1930s, and two visits from Sir Alan Cobham's National Aviation day Circus.

=== Second World War ===
As the entire area was on a plateau, the field was largely dry, unlike RAF Sealand and RAF Hawarden, both reclaimed from the River Dee. This dryness encouraged visits from several training squadrons, such as Supermarine Spitfires from RAF Ternhill. After the initial breakout of the War, No. 5 Service Flying Training School RAF used the ground as a relief strip, and in 1940, three grass runways of approximately 550-660 yards existed. The wet conditions of surrounding airfields usually caused training groups to send planes to Wrexham, which had no air traffic control, which caused several incidents.

The main period of construction at the site took place between December 1940 and June 1941, which often saw floodlit operations during the dark winter. The airfield was upgraded with hardened concrete runways and appropriate lighting for them, with defence against any possible ground invasion provided by the ring of defences surrounding the nearby Royal Ordnance Factory. The Airfield was primarily built to house a night fighter squadron for the air defence of Liverpool and Manchester, and in 1941, No. 96 Squadron RAF, a night fighter squadron, was moved to Wrexham from RAF Cranage. In 1944 it was occupied by RAF. 21 Grp. AFU.

It was also home to No. 285 Squadron, which provided Target tug aircraft for training exercises, starting with Bristol Blenheims, Lockheed Hudsons and Westland Lysanders, later replaced with Boulton Paul Defiants and Miles Martinets. After moving through a number of Headquarters, this squadron was disbanded 26 June 1945.

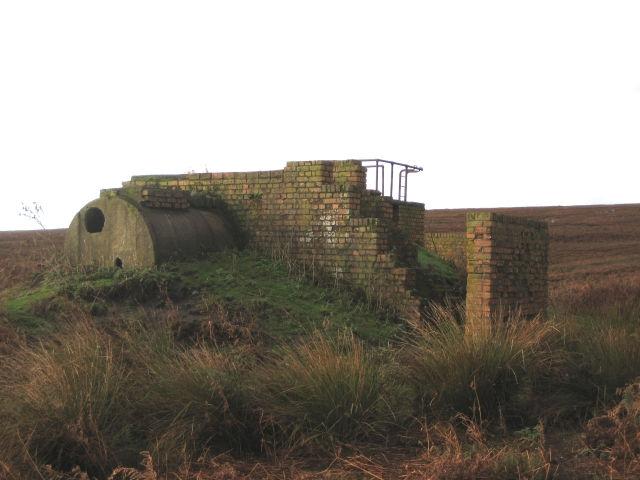
Remains of the decoy site on Esclusham Mountain

To the West, on Esclusham Mountain, a decoy airfield existed. This was only in operation from 1941 to 1943, however the mountain was bombed several times by incendiary bombers during the war, causing mountain fires. The waves of bombing were caused by a single bomber jettisoning its bombs after missing the Monsanto Chemical Works in nearby Cefn Mawr, followed by several targeted raids against the ensuing fire, with Luftwaffe crew believing the fires to be from a burning Liverpool.

The following units were here at some point:

- Detachment from No. 5 (Pilots) Advanced Flying Unit RAF between March and June 1943
- Detachment from No. 6 Anti-Aircraft Co-operation Unit RAF between December 1943 and November 1943
- No. 9 Group Anti-Aircraft Co-operation Flight RAF between August and September 1941 became 285 Squadron
- Relief Landing Ground of No. 11 (Pilots) Advanced Flying Unit RAF between February 1944 and June 1945
- Relief Landing Ground of No. 17 (Pilots) Advanced Flying Unit RAF between May 1943 and February 1944
- Satellite for No. 57 OTU between June 1941 and November 1942
- No. 121 Airfield Headquarters RAF formed here on 22 February 1943
- Detachment from No. 577 Squadron RAF
- Detachment from No. 595 Squadron RAF

=== US Army Airstrips ===
There was a US Army cubstrip on the Aerodrome itself. This was a small designated area where US Army Piper Cubs could land, in support of the 400th Armored Field Artillery battalion and No. 33 Signals Construction Battalion, who were billeted in local houses, most notably Acton Hall. There were no surface treatment or buildings at any of these sites. As well as the one on the airfield, there were four others; two in Acton, one just outside the Airfield, and one in Gresford, opposite the entrance gates of Gresford Colliery. These were used by the 322nd Field Artillery Battalion of the 83rd Infantry Division. None of these sites lasted more than a year.

=== After the RAF ===
The airfield was closed and placed on care and maintenance in 1945. On 22 October 1959, it was sold to United Gravel Company a subsidiary of Alfred McAlpine. In the 1970s quarrying operations commenced in the area and have almost obliterated the site, though one runway was kept in usable condition and a hangar built for the private use of a Beechcraft Super King Air by Alfred James McAlpine who lived in nearby Marchwiel. As recently as 2004, the original runway surface and paint still existed in places.

The site is also referred to as Borras Airfield, ICAO reference EGCE. In 1977 the National Eisteddfod of Wales was held on the airfield.

In 2005, the Tarmac quarry posted an application to increase quarrying activities. As a result of the archaeological report of this application, several of the original structures have been deemed intact, including a Bellman hangar, several gunnery butts, which were brick buildings used for target practice and alignment of fighter weapons. There are also several air crash sites in the area, including a Bristol Beaufighter that crashed into a pond.

== Cold War ==
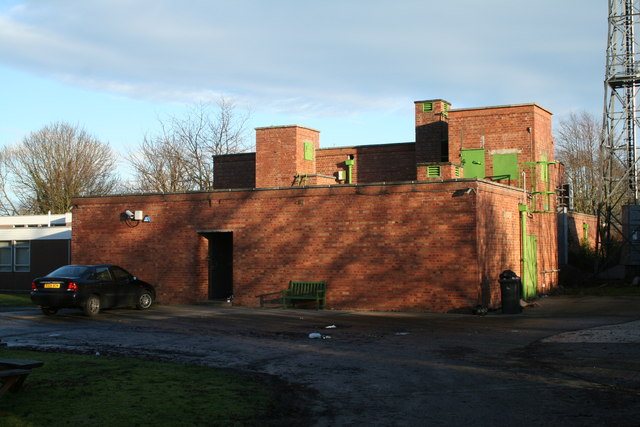
The ROC Bunker at Borras today in use as a recording studio.

Between 1962 and 1992 there was a hardened nuclear bunker, built for No 17 Group Royal Observer Corps North Wales, who provided the field force of the United Kingdom Warning and Monitoring Organisation and would have sounded the four-minute warning alarm in the event of war and warned the population of Wrexham in the event of approaching radioactive fallout. The building was manned by up to 80 volunteers who trained on a weekly basis and wore a Royal Air Force style uniform. After the break up of the communist bloc in 1989, the Royal Observer Corps was disbanded between September 1991 and December 1995. However, the nuclear bunker still stands on the site of RAF Wrexham as a lasting reminder of the Cold War, but is now converted and used as a recording studio.

== See also ==
- List of former Royal Air Force stations
