= No. 285 Squadron RAF =

Former Royal Air Force flying squadron

- Active: 1941–1945
- Country: United Kingdom
- Branch: Royal Air Force
- Role: Anti-aircraft Co-operation
- Motto(s): Respice Finem (Latin: Consider the end)

Insignia
- Squadron Badge heraldry: In front of a pair of wings elevated and conjoined in base, two bird bolts in saltire
- Squadron Codes: VG (Dec 1941 – Jul 1945)

No. 285 Squadron RAF was a non-operational Second World War Royal Air Force squadron that operated a variety of aircraft to provide targets for anti-aircraft gun practice initially in the North Midlands and North Wales area.

== History ==
The squadron was formed at RAF Wrexham on 1 December 1941 from No. 9 Group AAC Flight. In 1944 the squadron moved to RAF Andover and then RAF North Weald before finally moving to RAF Weston Zoyland where it was disbanded on 26 June 1945.

== Aircraft operated ==
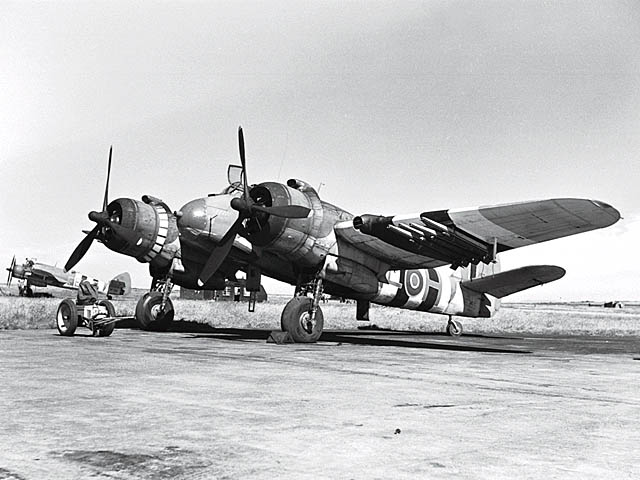
Bristol Beaufighter

Aircraft operated by No. 285 Squadron
From	To	Aircraft	Variant	Notes
Dec 1941	Mar 1942	Bristol Blenheim	Mk.I	
Dec 1941	Mar 1942	Lockheed Hudson	Mk.III	
Dec 1941	Jun 1942	Westland Lysander	Mks.II, III, IIIa	
Mar 1942	Jun 1945	Airspeed Oxford	Mks.I, II	
Mar 1942	Jan 1944	Boulton-Paul Defiant	Mks.I, III	
Sep 1943	Nov 1944	Bristol Beaufighter	Mk.If	
Jan 1944	Jun 1945	Hawker Hurricane	Mk.IIc	
Mar 1944	Apr 1944	Hawker Hurricane	Mk.IV	
Mar 1945	Jun 1945	North American Mustang	MK.I	
