= No. 257 Squadron RAF =

Defunct flying squadron of the Royal Air Force

No. 257 (Burma) Squadron RAF
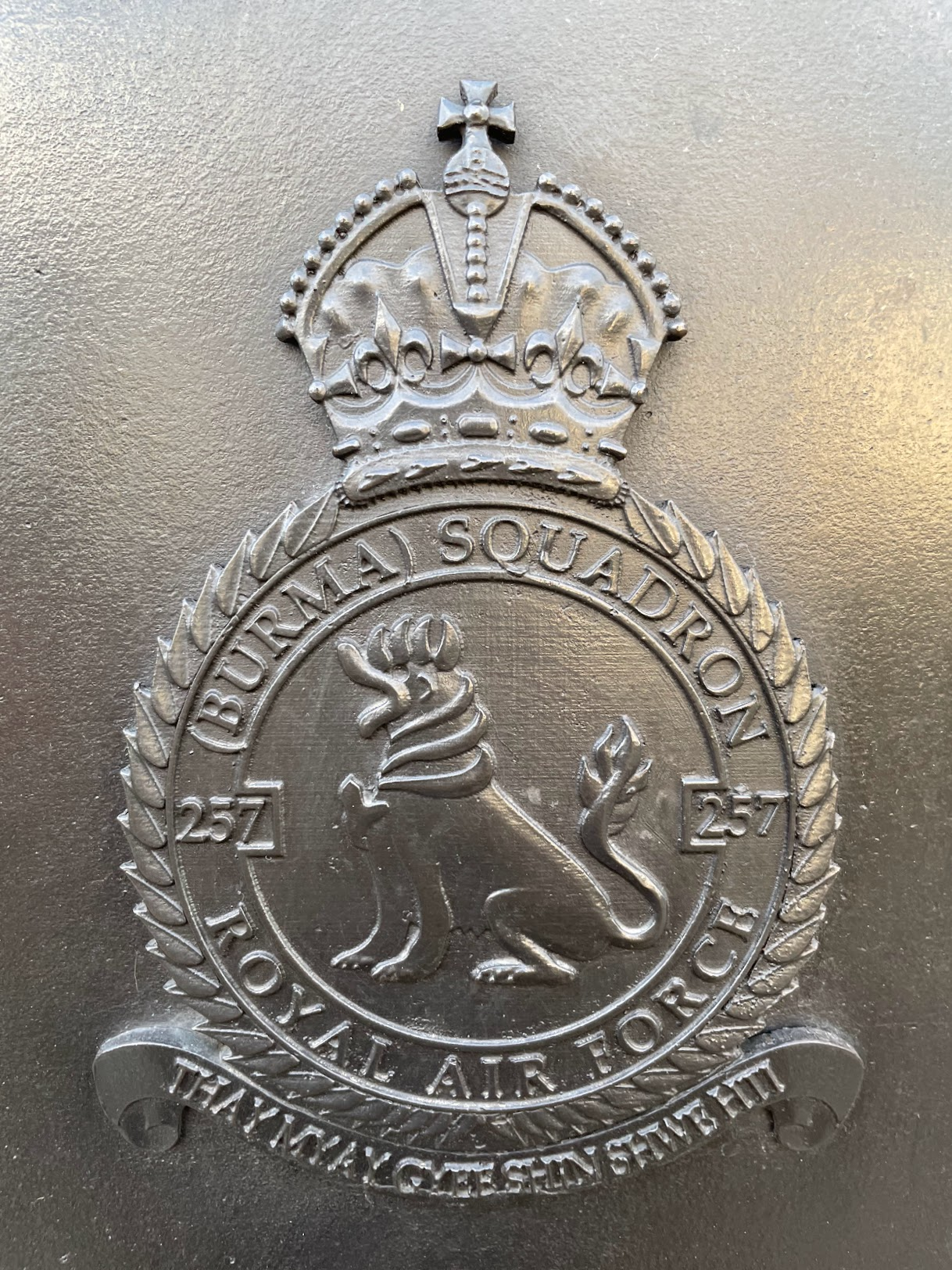
- The heraldic badge of the squadron as it appears on the Battle of Britain Monument in London.
- Active: 18 August 1918 - 30 June 1919; 17 May 1940 - 5 March 1945; 1 September 1946 - 31 March 1957; 1 July 1960 – 31 December 1963
- Country: United Kingdom
- Branch: Royal Air Force
- Nickname: Burma
- Mottos: Burmese: Thay myay gyee shin shwe hti ("Death or glory")
- post 1950 aircraft insignia

Commanders
- Notable commanders: Robert Stanford Tuck; Francis Soper

Insignia
- Squadron Badge: A Chinthe sejant
- Squadron Codes: ML (May 1940 - Jun 1940); DT (Jun 1940 - May 1941); FM (May 1941 - Mar 1945); A6 (Sep 1946 - 1951)

No. 257 Squadron RAF was a flying squadron of the Royal Air Force active during the First World War, the Second World War and also the Cold War. It was finally disbanded in December 1963.

== History ==
=== In World War I ===
No. 257 Squadron was formed at Dundee on 18 August 1918 from Nos. 318 and 319 Flights. It flew both seaplanes and flying boats on anti-submarine patrols from Dundee until the end of the First World War and disbanded there on 30 June 1919.

=== In World War II ===
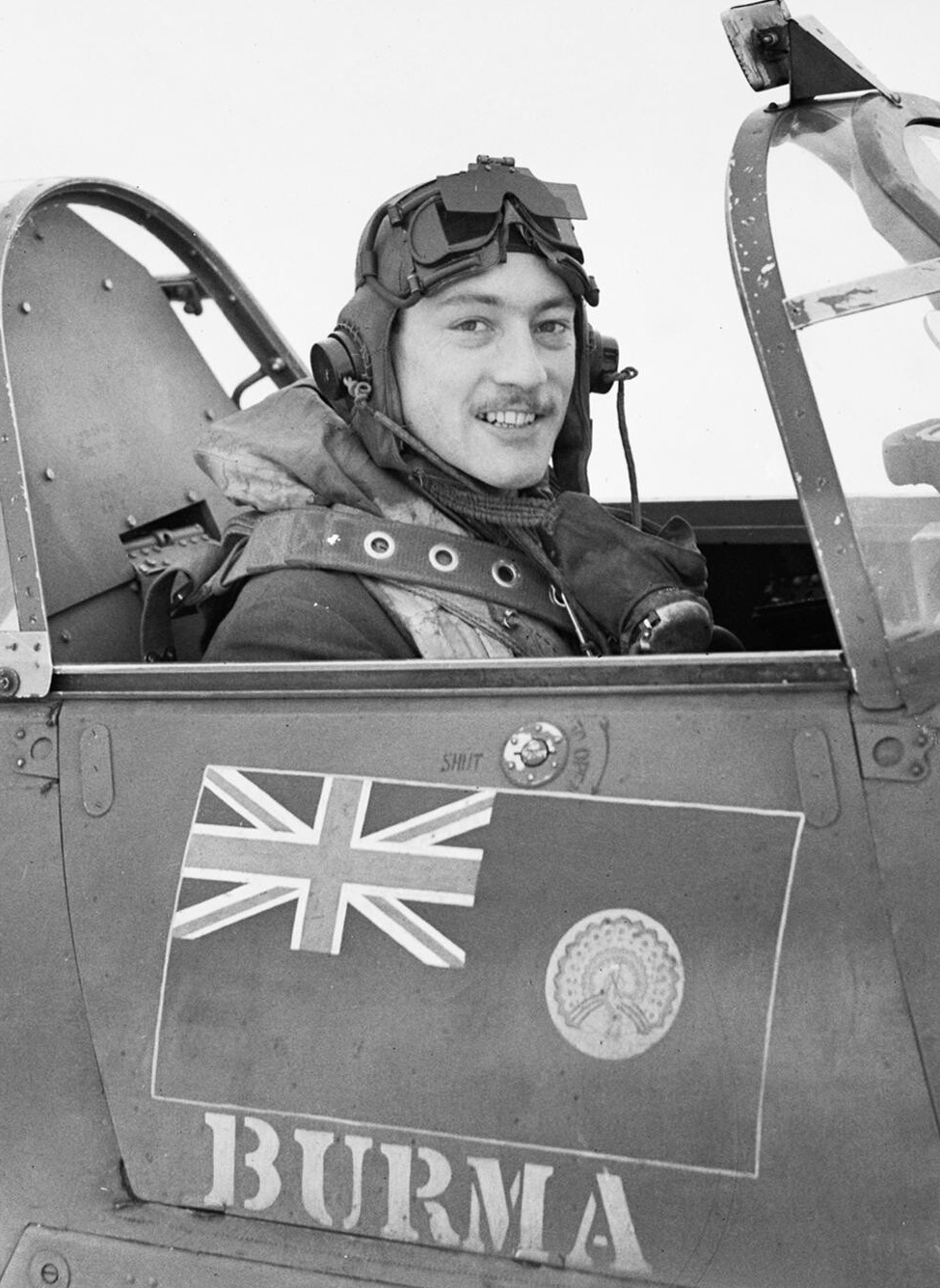
Robert Stanford Tuck in a No. 257 Squadron Hurricane

The squadron was re-formed on 17 May 1940 at RAF Hendon as a Fighter Squadron, equipped with Supermarine Spitfires. It became operational at RAF Northolt, where the squadron flew Hawker Hurricanes in the Battle of Britain, during which it was part of No. 11 Group RAF. The squadron was based in south-east England throughout the Battle of Britain and in March began taking part in sweeps over France. Night fighter patrols were also flown and in July 1942 converted to Hawker Typhoons which began low-level patrols in September to intercept enemy fighter-bomber raids. Escort missions were also flown and in July 1943, it began offensive operations. The squadron started fighter-bombing sorties in January 1944, and as part of the Second Tactical Air Force moved to France in July to provide air support for the Allied armies. By October it was based in Belgium for attacks on enemy transport and battlefield targets. The squadron disbanded on 5 March 1945.

During the Second World War the squadron was the Burma gift squadron; the chinthe (a lion) in its logo is a Burmese effigy.

=== Post War ===
On 1 September 1946 the squadron was re-formed at RAF Church Fenton as a fighter squadron, flying Gloster Meteors until January 1955. It then converted to Hawker Hunters. On 31 March 1957 the squadron was disbanded for the third time.

On 28 June 1949, two Meteors from the squadron - operating out of RAF Finningley to participate in a nine-day NATO operation called 'Exercise Foil', designed to test Britain's air defences - collided. Both pilots ejected. One was Flying officer A H Turner; the second Warrant Officer Levene. One aircraft crashed at Hatfield Moor, Lindholme, near Doncaster, and the second on a country estate near Retford called Serlby Park. A third Meteor, flown by F/O Hawes, also force-landed at Finningley due to undercarriage failure returning from the same mission to intercept 'enemy' USAF Boeing B-29 Superfortresses over the North Sea. There were no ground casualties.

=== On Bloodhounds ===
The squadron re-emerged on 1 July 1960 at RAF Warboys in Cambridgeshire as an air defence unit using Bristol Bloodhound missiles till 31 December 1963, when the squadron was disbanded for the fourth, and final time.

== See also ==
- Robert Stanford Tuck
