= RAF Charmy Down =

Former RAF station

RAF Charmy Down USAAF Station AAF-487
- Swainswick, Somerset in England
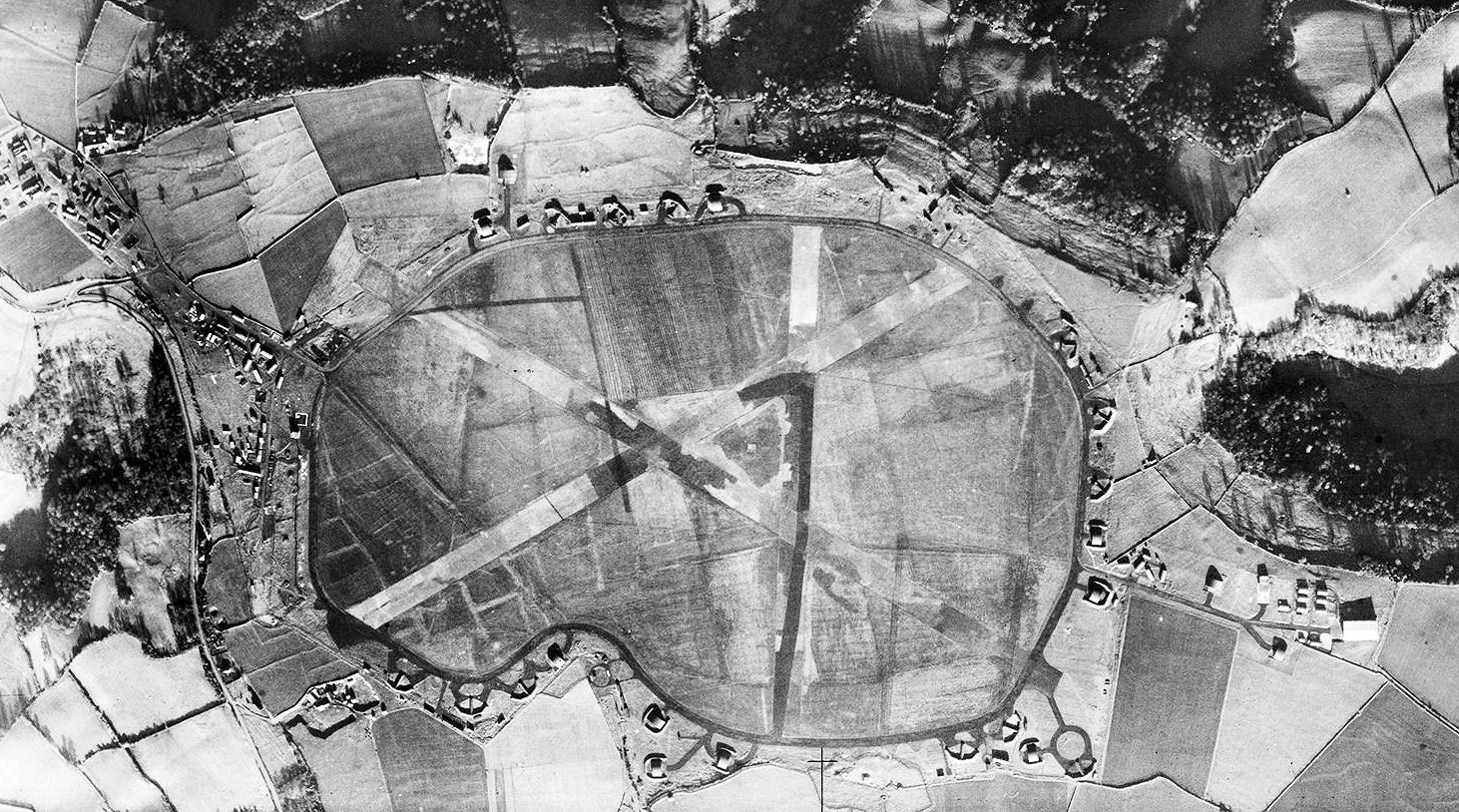
- Aerial photograph of RAF Charmy Down looking north, the control tower and technical site is on the left, 4 December 1943.

Site information
- Type: Royal Air Force station Satellite Station 1940-43
- Code: CH
- Owner: Air Ministry
- Operator: Royal Air Force; United States Army Air Forces
- Controlled by: RAF Fighter Command 1940-44 * No. 10 Group RAF; RAF Flying Training Command 1944- * No. 23 Group RAF

Location
- Shown within Somerset RAF Charmy Down (the United Kingdom)
- Coordinates: 51°25′46″N 002°20′50″W

Site history
- Built: 1939/40
- In use: November 1940 - October 1946
- Battles/wars: European theatre of World War II

Airfield information
- Elevation: 210 metres (689 ft) AMSL
Runways
| Direction | Length and surface |
|---|---|
| 02/20 | 850 metres (2,789 ft) Asphalt |
| 08/26 | 1,330 metres (4,364 ft) Asphalt |
| 14/32 | 1,230 metres (4,035 ft) Asphalt |

Royal Air Force Charmy Down or more simply RAF Charmy Down is a former Royal Air Force station in Somerset, England, approximately 3 miles (4.8 km) north-northeast of Bath.

Opened in 1941, it was used initially by the RAF and from 1943 by the United States Army Air Forces, primarily as a night fighter interceptor airfield. It was closed in 1946. Today the remains of the airfield are on private property and are used as agricultural fields.

== History ==
A kerbed long barrow site was flattened to make way for the airfield. A cremation urn had been found near a burial of a long necked beaker and a bronze dagger, believed to be from the Beaker people.

The airfield was planned as a satellite for the Maintenance Unit at nearby RAF Colerne, but by the time construction work started in 1940 it had been selected as a sector station by No. 10 Group of RAF Fighter Command.

RAF Charmy Down was opened late in 1940 and originally had a grass surface with landing strips of 4,125 feet (1,257 m), both southeast to northwest and northeast to southwest. It was upgraded to the Class A airfield standard set by the Air Ministry in 1941, with three concrete runways at 60-degree angles in a triangular pattern. A 50 feet (15 m) wide tarmac perimeter track and 39 aircraft dispersal points were constructed; there were 12 double pens and 15 single standings.

The technical site connected to the ground station and airfield had 12 Blister hangars, one Bellman hangar and various organisational, component and field maintenance shops, along with the maintenance personnel necessary to keep the aircraft airworthy and to quickly repair light to moderate battle damage. The ammunition dump was in concrete pens outside the perimeter track on the north side of the airfield, surrounded by large dirt mounds.

=== Royal Air Force use ===
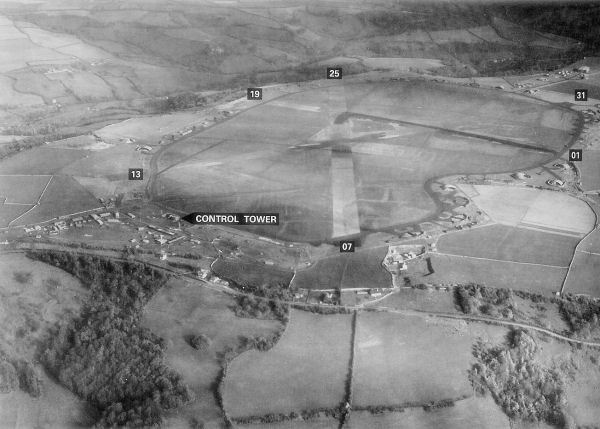
RAF Charmy Down in 1943

The first occupant of Charmy Down was No. 87 (United Provinces) Squadron RAF, with night-fighting Hawker Hurricanes. In the summer of 1941 Boulton Paul Defiants appeared, and Westland Whirlwinds and Turbinlite Havocs of 125 (Newfoundland) and 263 (Fellowship of the Bellows) squadrons respectively were to be seen the following year. 137 Squadron replaced No 263 Squadron in September 1941. In November 1941, 417 Squadron of the Royal Canadian Air Force was formed here.

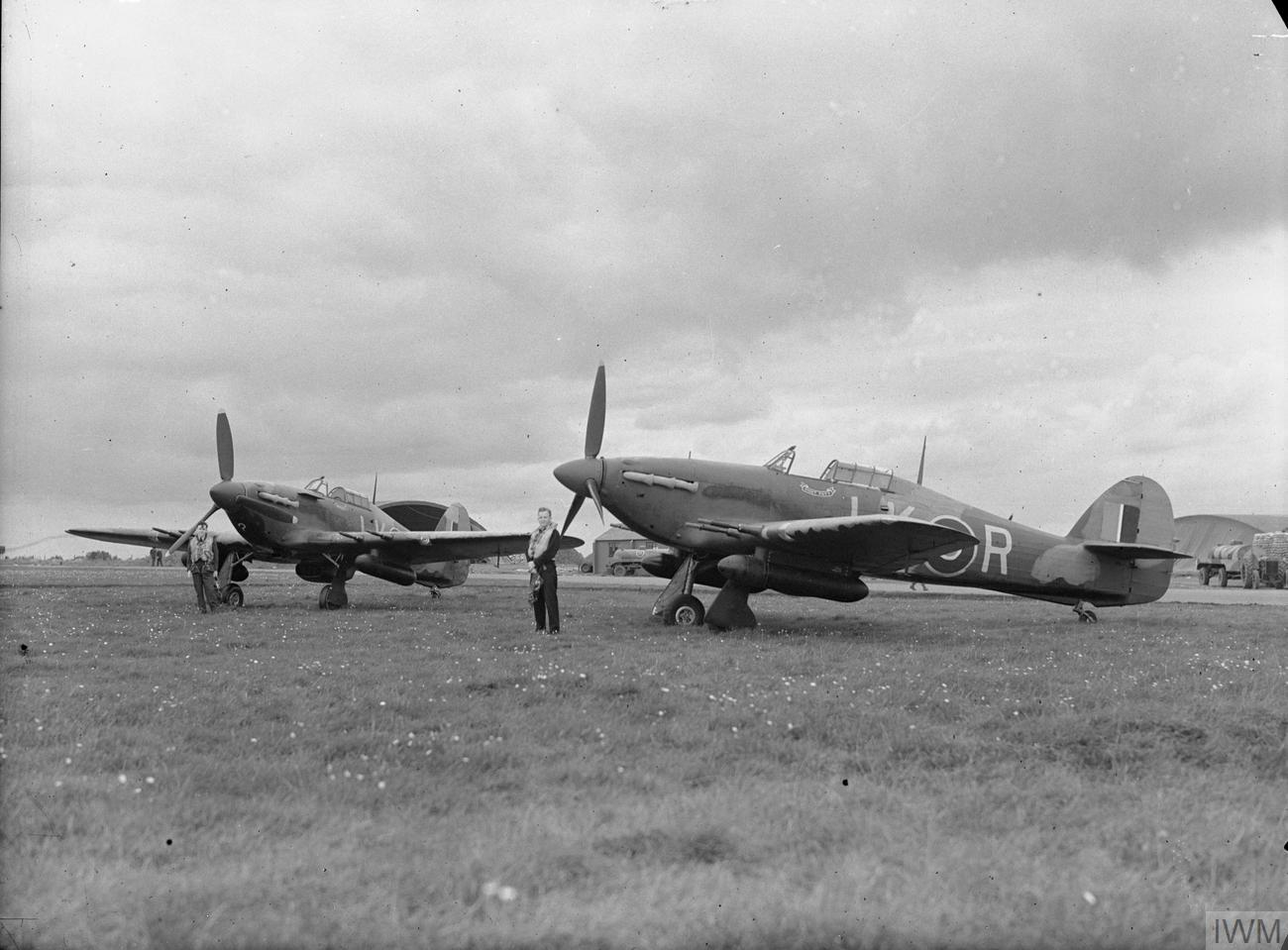
Hawker Hurricane Mark IIC night fighters on the airfield

During 1942 various other squadrons were posted to Charmy Down including 533 Squadron which was formed on 8 September 1942, from No. 1454 (Turbinlite) Flight, as part of No. 10 Group RAF in Fighter Command. Instead of operating only Turbinlite and aircraft equipped with aircraft interception (AI) radar (Havocs and Bostons) and working together with a normal night fighter unit, such as the Hawker Hurricanes of 87 (United Provinces) Squadron, the unit also flew their own Hurricanes. It was disbanded at Charmy Down on 25 January 1943, since Turbinlite squadrons were, due to lack of success and the rapid development of AI radar, deemed to be superfluous.

No. 52 OTU, a Supermarine Spitfire Operational Training Unit took over in 1943 and stayed until the airfield was turned over to the USAAF in November 1943.

The following units were also here at some point:

- Relief Landing Ground for No. 3 (Pilots) Advanced Flying Unit RAF (October 1944 - December 1945)
- Relief Landing Ground for No. 3 Flying Instructors School RAF
- No. 88 (Hong Kong) Squadron RAF (1941-42 & 1943)
- No. 107 Squadron RAF (1942-43)
- No. 234 (Madras Presidency) Squadron RAF (1942)
- No. 245 (Northern Rhodesian) Squadron RAF (1942-43)
- No. 247 (China-British) Squadron RAF
- No. 286 Squadron RAF
- No. 421 Squadron RCAF (1942)
- No. 2719 Squadron RAF Regiment
- No. 2729 Squadron RAF Regiment
- No. 2742 Squadron RAF Regiment
- No. 2777 Squadron RAF Regiment
- No. 2794 Squadron RAF Regiment
- No. 2798 Squadron RAF Regiment
- No. 2800 Squadron RAF Regiment
- No. 2806 Squadron RAF Regiment
- Fighter Leaders School RAF (February - October 1943)

=== United States Army Air Forces use ===
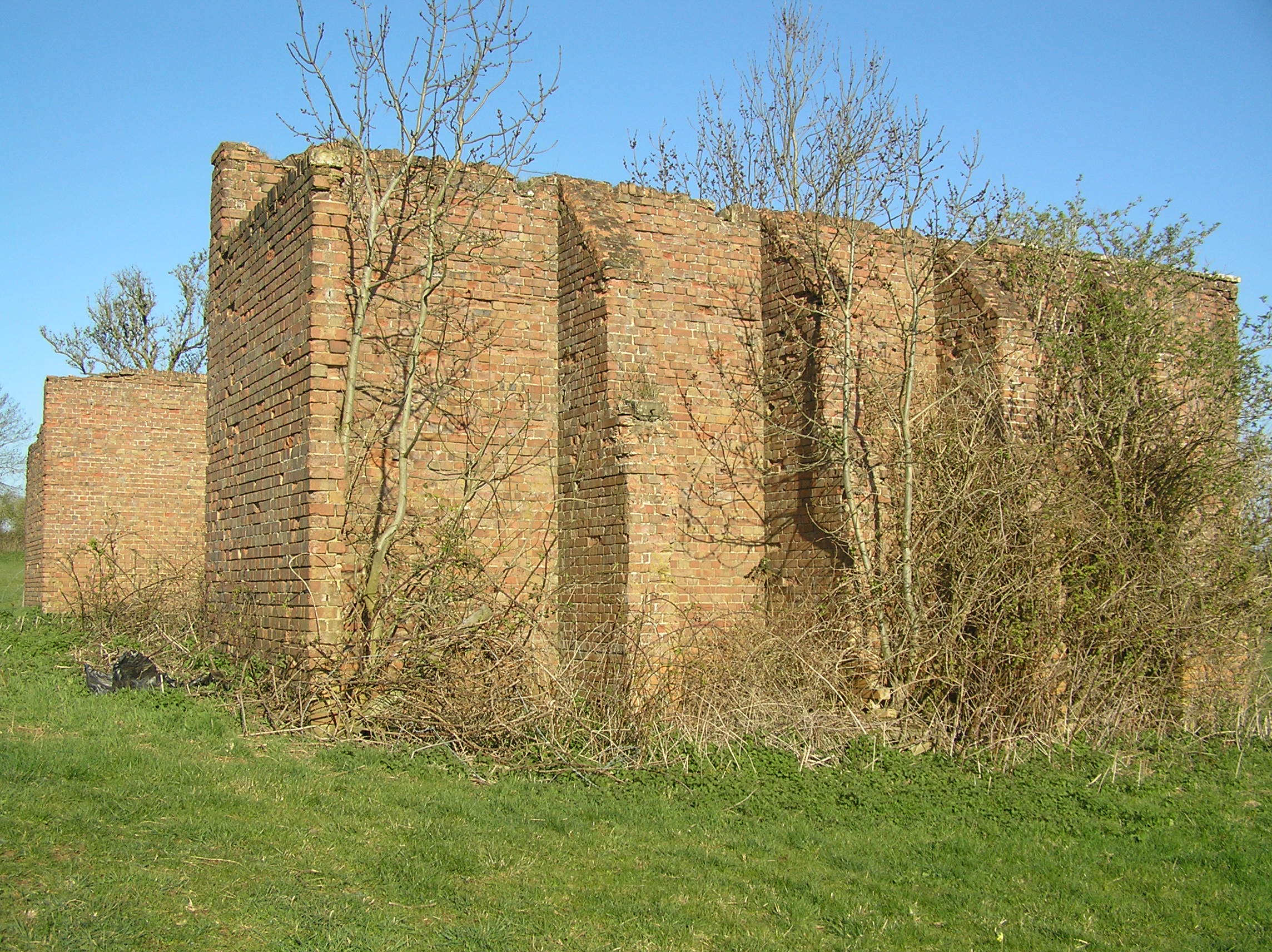
Remains of the aircraft shooting-in butt used to test the installed guns, in 2010

Charmy Down was known as USAAF Station AAF 487 for security reasons by the USAAF during the war, and not referred to by its location. The airfield code/USAAF Station Code was "CH".

==== 4th Tactical Air Depot ====
Service groups were deployed there late in 1943 to operate the 4th Tactical Air Depot, which was intended to repair, modify and maintain Allison-engined fighter types, primarily Lockheed P-38 Lightnings and North American P-51 Mustangs.

For unrecorded reasons, it was decided to transfer this operation to RAF Kingston Bagpuize early in 1944, possibly for better local logistics and communications in the Oxford area. Nevertheless, IX Air Force Service Command activities continued at Charmy Down until the autumn of 1944.

==== 422d, 423d and 425th Night Fighter Squadrons ====
The Ninth Air Force was scheduled to receive three night fighter squadrons with a mission to effect night air defence of US airfields when these were established on the Continent. RAF Charmy Down was selected as an airfield for these squadrons which would arrive individually, not as part of a group, and were to be equipped with the new Northrop P-61 Black Widow.

Personnel of the 422nd Night Fighter Squadron arrived first on 7 March 1944 and had their aircrews posted to various RAF night fighter and signal schools for theatre indoctrination.

=== Postwar use ===
After the end of hostilities in Europe, the airfield returned to the RAF. There was little flying from the station although it was not officially closed until October 1946. From January 1946 to October 1946, No 92 Gliding School, Air Training Corps used the airfield and it was home to the Personnel Resettlement Centre for Australians as No. 11 (RAAF) Personnel Reception Centre.

In the 1950s, Charmy Down was included at a low priority on the list of sites for the deployment of the ROTOR radar system. Construction started in May 1953 but was abandoned in April 1955, and only groundworks remain.

== Current use ==
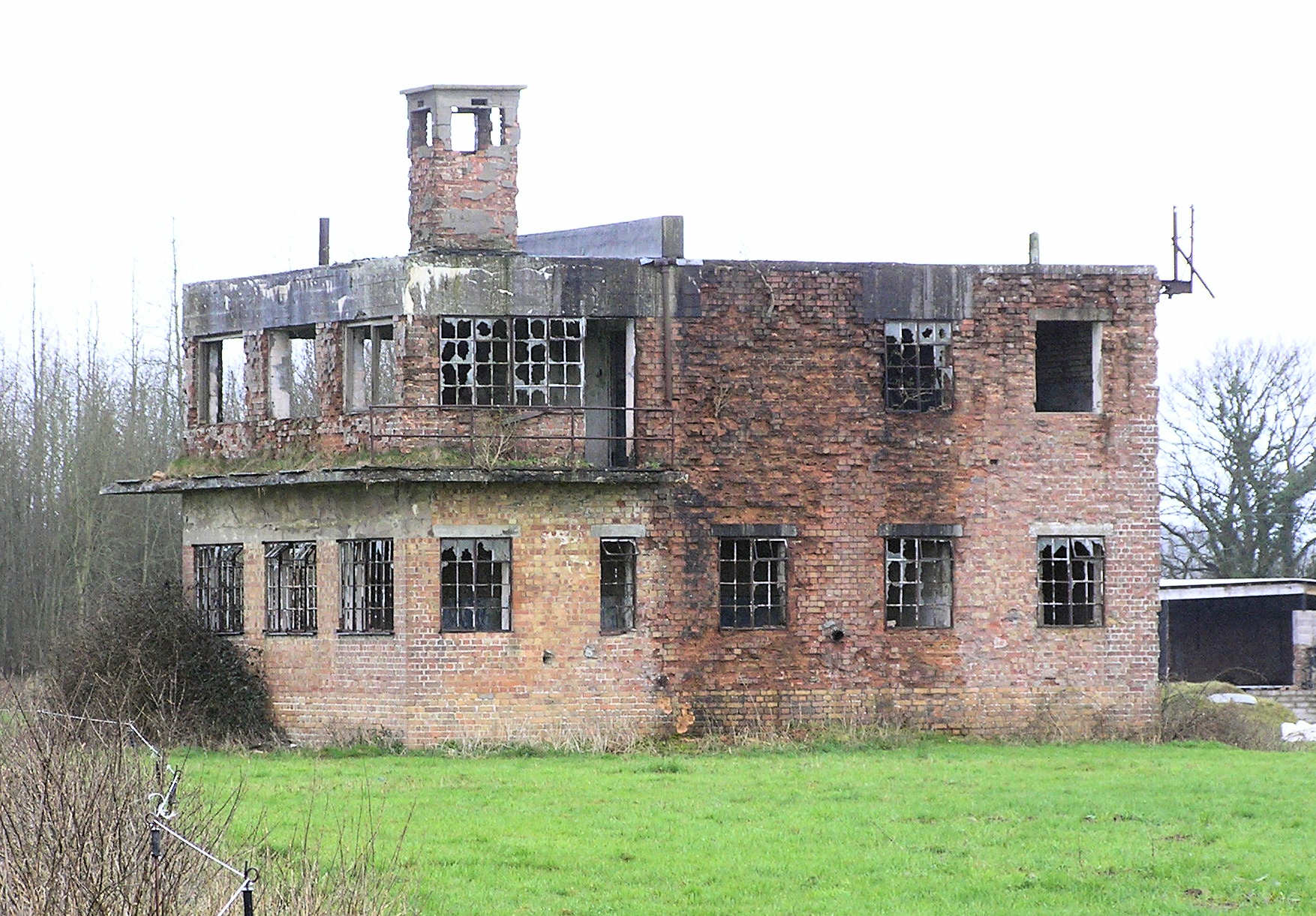
The control tower in 2010

With the facility released from military control, the airfield stood intact yet disused for many years. Eventually the hangars were removed, but the outline of the runways can still be seen in aerial photography. Test probing (2018) suggests the runways remain approximately 5 cm below the now grassed-over surface. Most of the perimeter track remains, mostly in a half-width condition, as do several of the derelict buildings, including the control tower. A few of the Blister hangars remain and are used for farm storage. Most of the pillboxes also remain but, being largely subterranean, are filled in. The ammunition dumps, also derelict, remain.

Bath and North East Somerset Council has considered, but rejected, building a park and ride for Bath on Charmy Down.

Part of the 06/24 runway serves as a microlight airstrip (2018), and model aircraft are flown further along (NNE) the same runway.

A large part of the former airfield, and some adjacent land, is owned by Wessex Water who own Monkswood Reservoir, built in 1896, which is 1 kilometre (0.6 mi) north of the airfield.

== See also ==
- List of former Royal Air Force stations
