= No. 27 Group RAF =

Former Royal Air Force flying training group

No. 27 (Signals Training) Group RAF ~~No. 27 (Operations) Group RAF~~
- Royal Air Force Ensign
- Active: August 1918 and May 1919; May 1941 and October 1958
- Country: United Kingdom
- Branch: Royal Air Force
- Type: Royal Air Force group
- Role: Military aviation training
- Part of: RAF Technical Training Command

No. 27 Group RAF is a former group of the Royal Air Force that was operational between August 1918 and May 1919 during the First World War, and between May 1941 and October 1958 during the Second and Cold War.

The group controlled No. 27 Group Communication Flight RAF between 27 May 1941 and 30 July 1952 which used the following airfields:

- RAF South Cerney
- RAF Aston Down
- RAF Southrop
- RAF Fairford
- RAF Debden
- RAF Colerne

== Structure ==
Order of Battle during July 1944:

- HQ at Royal Agricultural College, Cirencester, Gloucestershire, England
  - Blackpool = No. 13 Radio School RAF
  - Municipal Technical College, Mawdsley Road, Bolton = No. 6 Radio School RAF
  - RAF Carew Cheriton = No. 10 Radio School RAF
  - RAF Compton Bassett = No. 3 Radio School RAF
  - RAF Cranwell = No. 1 Radio School RAF & No. 8 Radio School RAF
  - RAF Hooton Park = No. 11 Radio School RAF
  - RAF Madley = No. 4 Radio School RAF
  - Haddington, Oxford = No. 5 Radio School RAF
  - RAF St Athan = No. 12 Radio School RAF
  - RAF Yatesbury = No. 9 Radio School RAF

== Headquarters ==
- Room 230, Air Ministry, London = 29 August 1918 – 11 October 1918
- RAF Bircham Newton = 11 October 1918 – 19 May 1919

Disbanded

- RAF Langley Hall, Slough = 26 May 1941 – 7 July 1941
- RAF Lechlade = 7 July 1941 – 22 January 1945
- RAF Southrop = 22 January 1945 – 18 September 1947
- RAF Debden = 18 September 1947 – 15 September 1949
- RAF Colerne = 15 September 1949 – 20 July 1953
- RAF Yatesbury (Cherhill) = 20 July 1953 – 1 October 1958

Disbanded
