= No. 1454 Flight RAF =

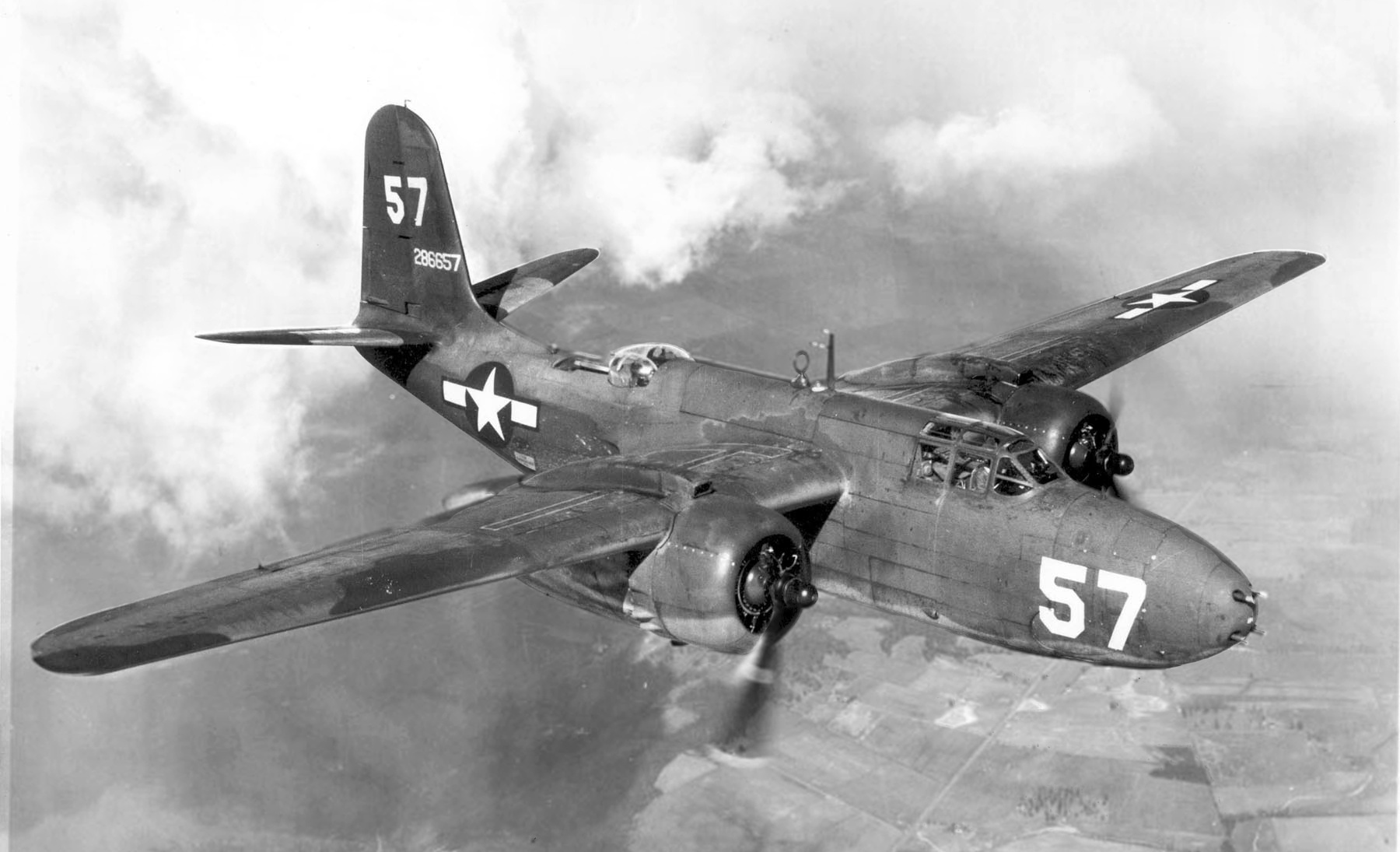
- An A-20 Havoc of the USAAF, like the ones used by the flight
- Active: 27 Jun 1941 – 8 Sep 1942
- Country: United Kingdom
- Branch: Royal Air Force
- Role: Night Fighter (Turbinlite)
- Part of: No. 10 Group RAF, Fighter Command

Insignia
- Squadron Badge heraldry: No known badge
- Squadron Codes: No known identification code for the flight is known to have been carried

No. 1454 (Fighter) Flight was formed at RAF Colerne, Wiltshire on 27 June 1941, equipped with Turbinlite Douglas Boston and Douglas Havoc aircraft. By 26 January 1942 the flight moved to RAF Charmy Down, Somerset. On operations they co-operated with the Hawker Hurricanes of 87 Squadron, which also flew from Charmy Down. The flight was replaced with 533 Squadron on 8 September 1942 (not on 2 September due to administrative reasons) but officially disbanded as late as 31 January 1943.

533 Sqn, which had taken over men and machines, carried on flying the Turbinlite Bostons and Havocs till the system was abandoned on 25 January 1943, when Turbinlite squadrons were, due to lack of success on their part and the rapid development of AI radar, thought to be superfluous.

== Aircraft operated ==
Aircraft operated by no. 1454 Flight RAF, data from
From	To	Aircraft	Version
27 June 1941	8 September 1942	Douglas Havoc	Mk.I (Turbinlite)
27 June 1941	8 September 1942	Douglas Havoc	Mk.I
27 June 1941	8 September 1942	Douglas Havoc	Mk.II (Turbinlite)
27 June 1941	8 September 1942	Douglas Boston	Mk.II (Turbinlite)
27 June 1941	8 September 1942	Douglas Boston	Mk.III (Turbinlite)

== Flight bases ==
Bases and airfields used by no. 1454 Flight RAF, data from
From	To	Base
27 June 1941	26 January 1942	RAF Colerne, Wiltshire
26 January 1942	8 September 1942	RAF Charmy Down, Somerset

== Commanding officers ==
Officers commanding no. 1454 Flight RAF, data from
From	To	Name
27 June 1941	September 1941	S/Ldr. C.L. Gomm, DFC
September 1941	October 1941	S/Ldr. B.H.M. Winslett
October 1941	March 1942	S/Ldr. W.G. Moseby
March 1942	8 September 1942	S/Ldr. D.P. McKeown, AFC
