= RAF Southrop =

Former RAF station in Gloucestershire, England

RAF Southrop
- Near Southrop, Gloucestershire in England
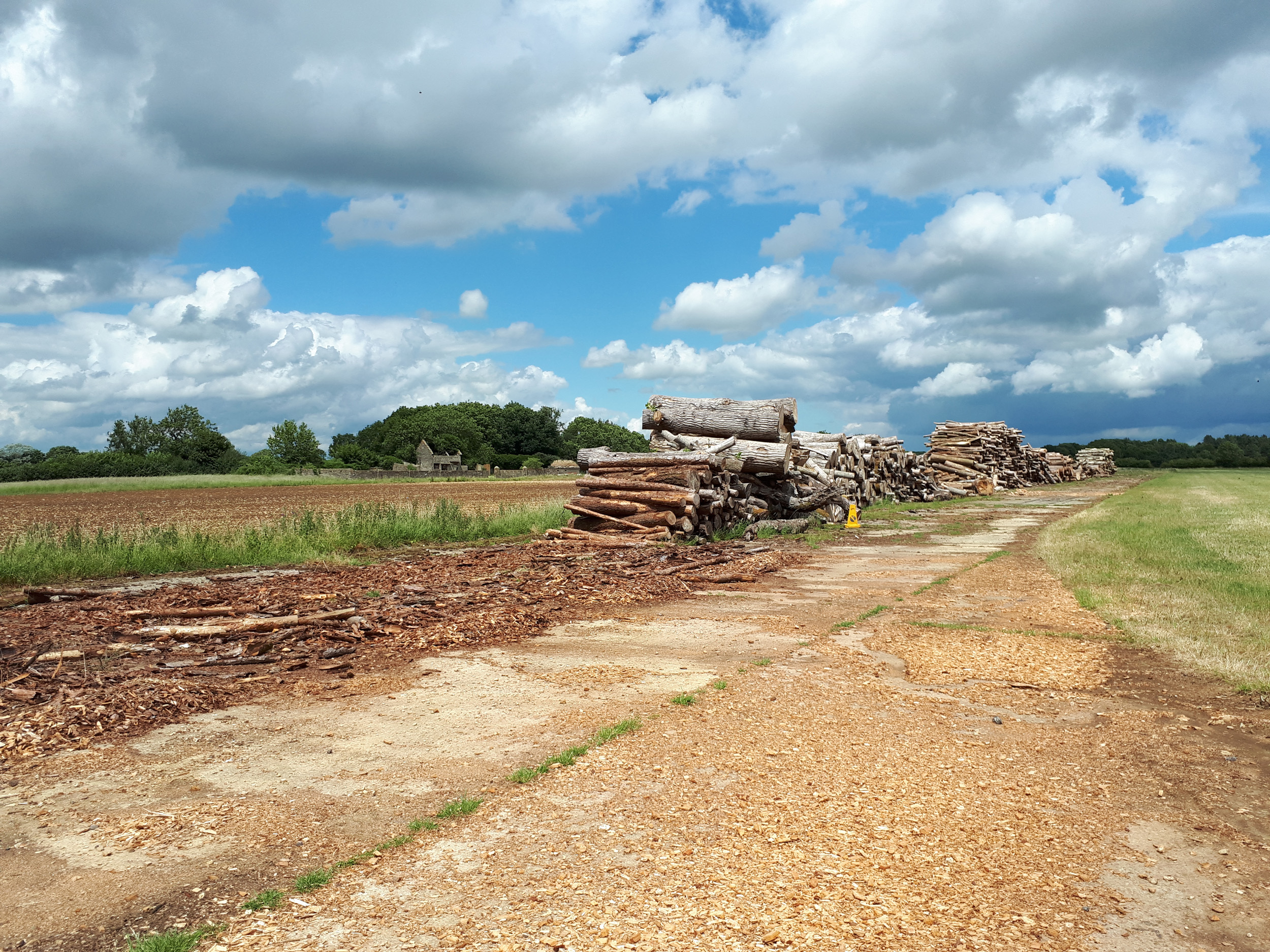
- Former runway

Site information
- Type: Royal Air Force satellite station
- Owner: Air Ministry
- Operator: Royal Air Force
- Controlled by: RAF Flying Training Command

Location
- Shown within Gloucestershire RAF Southrop (the United Kingdom)
- Coordinates: 51°43′50″N 001°44′24″W

Site history
- Built: 1940
- In use: 1940 - 1947
- Battles/wars: European theatre of World War II

Airfield information
Runways
Direction	Length and surface
04/22	3,060 metres (10,039 ft) Grass
14/32	2,790 metres (9,154 ft) Grass
E/W	3,450 metres (11,319 ft) Grass

Royal Air Force Southrop or more simply RAF Southrop is a former Royal Air Force Satellite Station west of the village of Southrop, Gloucestershire during the Second World War from August 1940 to November 1945.

It had three grass runways, It was used as a Relief Landing Ground for Airspeed Oxford and North American Harvard training aircraft for No. 23 Group RAF.

The defences included a double pillbox.

The following units were here at some point:

- No. 2 (Pilots) Advanced Flying Unit RAF
- No. 2 Service Flying Training School RAF
- No. 3 (Pilots) Advanced Flying Unit RAF
- No. 6 Service Flying Training School RAF
- No. 27 Group Communication Flight RAF
- No. 27 (Signals Training) Group RAF
- No. 1539 (Beam Approach Training) Flight RAF

== Current use ==
The site is currently farmland.
