= RAF Colerne =

Former airfield in Wiltshire, England

RAF Colerne
- Colerne, Wiltshire in England
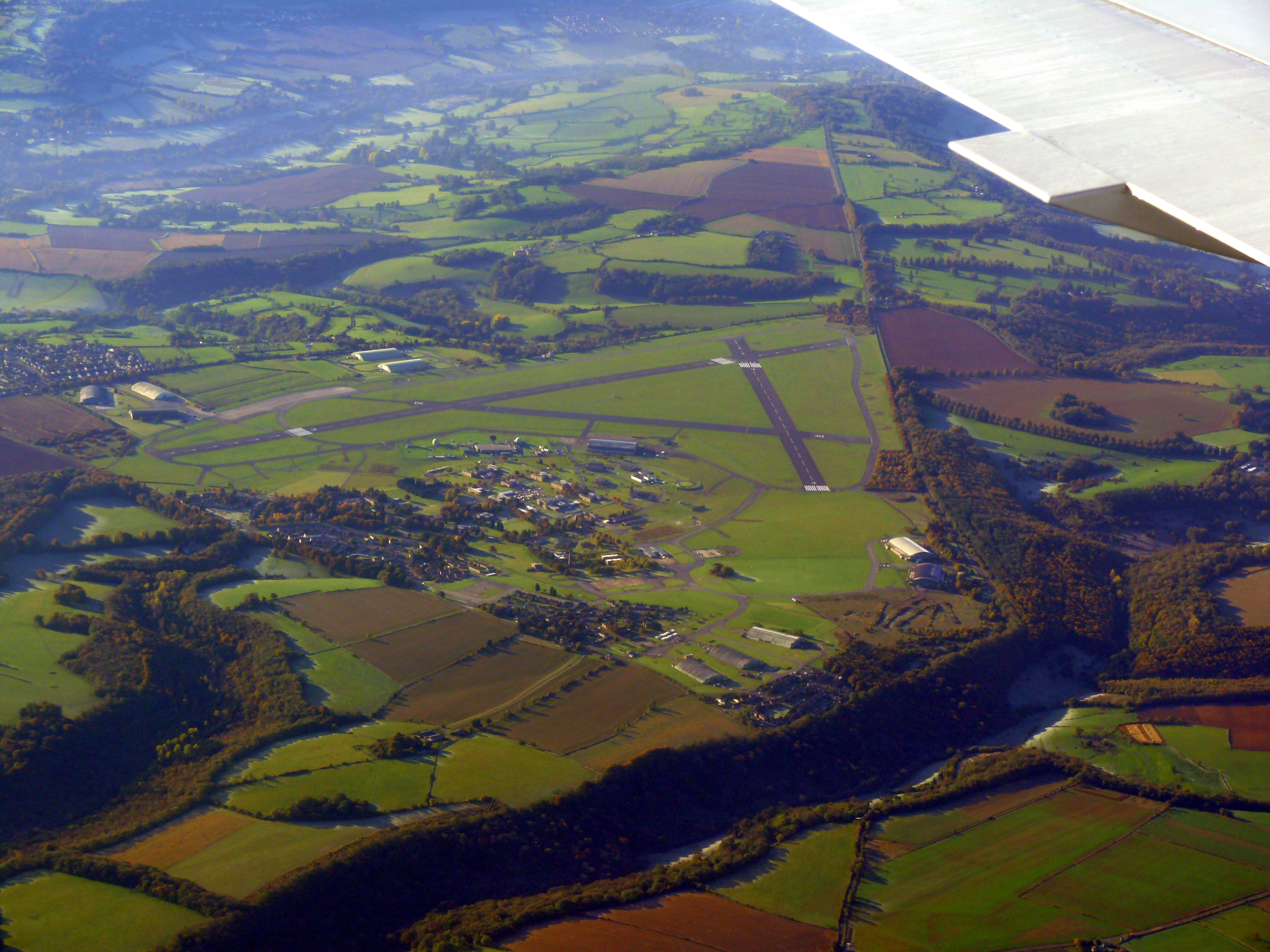
- An aerial view of the airfield.

Site information
- Type: Royal Air Force station * Sector Station 1940-
- Code: CQ
- Owner: Ministry of Defence
- Operator: Royal Air Force
- Controlled by: RAF Fighter Command * No. 10 Group RAF
- Condition: Closed

Location
- Location in Wiltshire RAF Colerne (the United Kingdom)
- Coordinates: 51°26′28″N 002°16′57″W
- Area: 110 hectares

Site history
- Built: 1938/39
- In use: January 1940 – 1974
- Fate: Transferred to the British Army and became Azimghur Barracks. Airfield retained for occasional flying.
- Battles/wars: European theatre of World War II; Cold War

Airfield information
- Identifiers: ICAO: EGUO
- Elevation: 175 metres (574 ft) AMSL
Runways
Direction	Length and surface
01/19	1,095 metres (3,593 ft) Asphalt
07/25	1,664 metres (5,459 ft) Asphalt
00/00	Asphalt

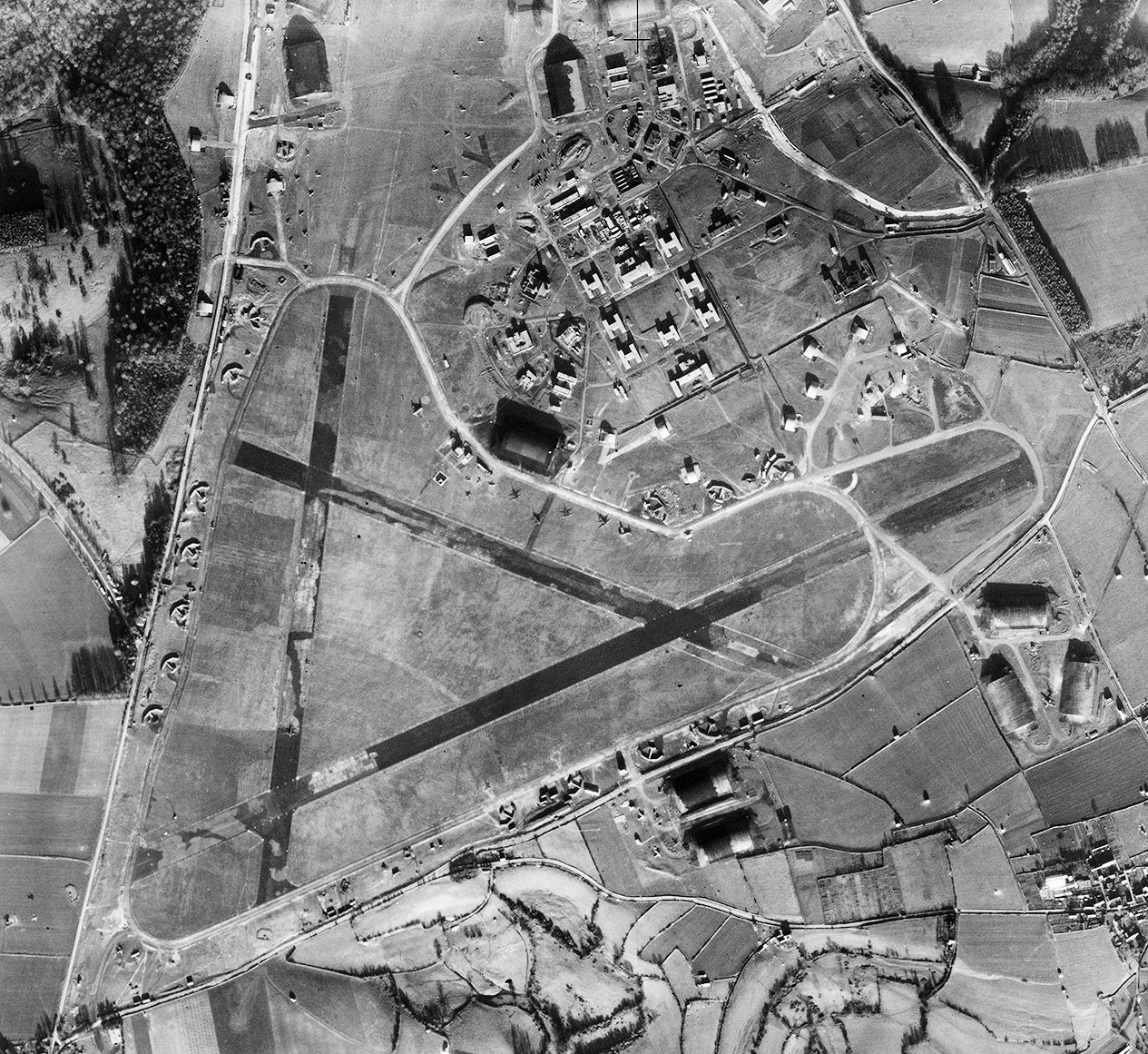
Aerial photograph of Colerne Airfield looking north, technical site and barracks at upper right, 4 December 1943

Royal Air Force Colerne or more simply RAF Colerne is a former Royal Air Force station which was on the outskirts of the village of Colerne in Wiltshire, England, and was in use from 1939 to 1976.

The site is now known as Azimghur Barracks and is home to 21 Signal Regiment, Royal Signals and 93 (City of Bath) Air Training Corps detached flight.

== History ==
=== Second World War ===
Originally there had been a farm called Doncombe and a vineyard on the site of the airfield, the names of Doncombe Lane and Doncombe Hill being the last link to the farm.

From 1940 to 1955 RAF Fighter Command units were based here. During the Battle of Britain the airfield served as a satellite field to RAF Middle Wallop, and squadrons rotated back and forth from there on a daily basis.

Later it was a training station for night fighter navigators. Using the latest night fighter procedures, the unit involved was No. 238 Operational Conversion Unit RAF from June 1952 until January 1957 and Bristol Brigand twin engine aircraft were used for this purpose. They also operated Bristol Buckmaster Aircraft for pilot training, and a number of Boulton Paul Balliol aircraft – an advanced pilot trainer powered by a Rolls-Royce Merlin engine. The pilot and trainee sat side-by-side in the wide fuselage, and the Balliols were used as targets for the Brigand aircraft to practice radar interceptions on.

Squadron	Equipment	From	To	Departed To	Notes
No. 19 Squadron RAF	Supermarine Spitfire VB	23 July 1942	31 July 1942	RAF Perranporth	
No. 29 Squadron RAF	de Havilland Mosquito XIIII/XXX	22 February 1945	11 May 1945	RAF Manston	
No. 87 (United Provinces) Squadron RAF	Hawker Hurricane I Hurricane IIC	28 November 1940; 7 August 1941	18 December 1940; 27 January 1942	RAF Charmy Down	Detachment at RAF Charmy Down. Det at RAF St Mary's.
No. 89 Squadron RAF	Bristol Beaufighter IF	25 September 1941	19 November 1941	en route Egypt	Reformed here.
No. 118 Squadron RAF	Spitfire IIA	7 April 1941	9 April 1941	RAF Warmwell	
No. 124 (Baroda) Squadron RAF	Spitfire VII	March 1943	26 July 1943	RAF Northolt	As a detachment from RAF North Weald.
No. 125 (Newfoundland) Squadron RAF	Boulton Paul Defiant I Defiant II Beaufighter IIF	16 June 1941 25 January 1942	7 August 1941 14 May 1942	RAF Charmy Down RAF Fairwood Common	Full Squadron Det at RAF Fairwood Common; Det at RAF Charmy Down.
No. 131 (County of Kent) Squadron RAF	Spitfire IX; Spitfire VII	10 February 1944; 29 February 1944	22 February 1944; 24 March 1944	RAF Fairwood Common; Harrowbeer	
No. 137 Squadron RAF	Hurricane IV; Hawker Typhoon IB	2 January 1944	4 February 1944	RAF Lympne	
No. 151 Squadron RAF	Defiant I Mosquito II/XII/VI/XIII	30 April 1943; 17 November 1943	16 August 1943; 25 March 1944	RAF Middle Wallop; RAF Predannack	
No. 165 (Ceylon) Squadron RAF	Spitfire VC/IXB	10 February 1944; 7 March 1944	1 March 1944; 10 March 1944	RAF Fairwood Common; RAF Culmhead	
No. 175 Squadron RAF	Hurricane IIB; Typhoon IB	8 April 1943	29 May 1943	RAF Lasham	
No. 183 (Gold Coast) Squadron RAF	Typhoon IB	24 March 1943	8 April 1943	RAF Gatwick	
No. 184 Squadron RAF	Hurricane IID	1 December 1942	1 March 1943	RAF Chilbolton	Det at RAF Milfield.
No. 219 (Mysore) Squadron RAF	Mosquito XVII	26 March 1944	1 April 1944	RAF Bradwell Bay	
No. 256 Squadron RAF	Defiant I	6 February 1941	26 March 1941	RAF Squires Gate	Det at RAF Middle Wallop.
No. 263 (Fellowship of the Bellows) Squadron RAF	Westland Whirlwind I	28 January 1942; 15 August 1942	10 February 1942; 13 September 1942	RAF Fairwood Common; RAF Warmwell	
No. 264 (Madras Presidency) Squadron RAF	Defiant II; Mosquito II; Mosquito XIII	1 May 1942; 30 November 1944	30 April 1943; 1 December 1944	RAF Odiham	
No. 285 Squadron RAF	Defiant III; Miles Martinet I	25 August 1943	19 November 1944	RAF Andover	As a detachment from RAF Woodvale.
No. 286 Squadron RAF	Miles Master III; Defiant III/I; Hurricane I Airspeed Oxford	30 December 1941; 2 March 1942	24 January 1942; 30 April 1942	RAF Lulsgate Bottom; RAF Lulsgate Bottom	
No. 307 Polish Night Fighter Squadron	Defiant I	26 March 1941	26 April 1941	RAF Exeter	
No. 316 Polish Fighter Squadron	Hurricane I/IIA/IIB	18 June 1941	2 August 1941	RAF Northolt	
No. 317 Polish Fighter Squadron	Hurricane I	26 June 1941	27 June 1941	RAF Fairwood Common	
No. 402 Squadron RCAF	Hurricane IB; Spitfire VB	4 March 1942	17 March 1942	RAF Fairwood Common	
No. 406 Squadron RCAF	Mosquito XXX	17 September 1944	27 November 1944	RAF Manston	
No. 410 Squadron RCAF	Mosquito XIII/XXX	28 July 1944	9 September 1944	RAF Hunsdon	
No. 417 Squadron RCAF	Spitfire IIA/VB	26 January 1942	24 February 1942	RAF Tain	
No. 456 Squadron RAAF	Beaufighter IIF/VIF; Mosquito II; Mosquito VI	December 1942 17 August 1943	29 March 1943 17 November 1943	RAF Middle Wallop RAF Fairwood Common	
No. 488 Squadron RNZAF	Mosquito XIII	3 May 1944; 29 July 1944	12 May 1944; 9 October 1944	RAF Zeals; RAF Hunsdon	
No. 501 (County of Gloucester) Squadron AAF	Spitfire I/IIA	9 April 1941	25 June 1941	RAF Chilbolton	
No. 504 (County of Nottingham) Squadron AAF	Spitfire IXE; Meteor III	28 March 1945	10 August 1945	Disbanded	Dets at RAF Andrews Field and Lübeck.
No. 587 Squadron RAF	Oxford; Hawker Henley III; Hurricane IV; Miles Martinet; Hurricane IIC	10 April 1944	1 October 1944	RAF Weston Zoyland	As a detachment from RAF Culmhead.
No. 600 (City of London) Squadron AAF	Beaufighter IIF	27 April 1941; 27 June 1941	18 June 1941; 6 October 1941	RAF Fairwood Common; RAF Predannack	Det at RAF Predannack.
No. 604 (County of Middlesex) Squadron AAF	Mosquito XIII; Mosquito XII	13 July 1944; 28 July 1944	25 July 1944; 6 August 1944	RAF Zeals; A-8 Picauville	Det at A-15 Maupertus.
No. 616 (South Yorkshire) Squadron AAF	Meteor I/III	17 January 1945	28 February 1945	RAF Andrews Field	Det at B 58 Melsbroek.

The following units were here during the Second World War:

- Aircraft Delivery Flight, Colerne RAF became No. 2 Aircraft Delivery Flight RAF (March 1941 – July 1943)
- No. 2 Supplementary School of Technical Training RAF (March – May 1941)
- No. 4 Aircraft Assembly Unit RAF (July 1940 – March 1942) became No. 218 Maintenance Unit RAF (March 1942 – February 1948)
- No. 10 Group Communication Flight RAF (July 1940 – April 1945)
- No. 149 (Long Range Fighter) Wing RAF (July – September 1944)
- No. 1454 (Fighter) Flight RAF (June 1941 – January 1942)
- No. 1457 (Fighter) Flight RAF (September – November 1941)
- Detachment of No. 1487 (Fighter) Gunnery Flight RAF (January – February 1943)
- No. 1498 (Target Towing) Flight RAF (August – September 1943)
- Fortress Flight RAF (1942 – October 1942)
- Special Installation Flight RAF (August 1942 – February 1948 & October 1953 – March 1962)

=== Cold War and closure ===
Between 4 May 1948 and 1 March 1962, No. 49 Maintenance Unit RAF was based at the airfield.

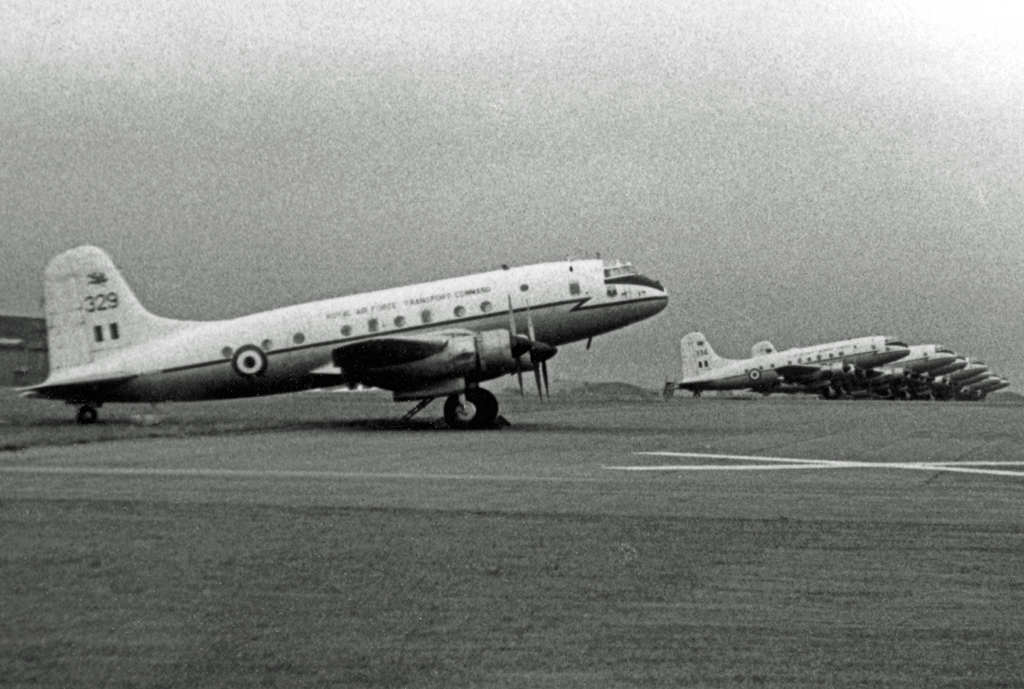
Handley Page Hastings of No. 24 Squadron Transport Command at RAF Colerne in 1967

After this period it became a Transport Command airfield, and Handley Page Hastings aircraft were flown from RAF Colerne. After the demise of the Hastings and the introduction of the new Lockheed C-130 Hercules to the RAF Air Support Command, the front-line transport role was relinquished. The Hercules were based at RAF Lyneham, also in Wiltshire, and for many years major servicing of the Hercules was carried out at RAF Colerne by the Air Engineering Squadron, until the station closed in 1976.

C-130 Hercules aircraft XV198 crashed, killing all crew on board, here in September 1973.

Colerne was also the home of No. 2 Field Squadron RAF Regiment from 1962 to 1975. For a number of years up until its closure as an RAF station it housed one of the RAF's regional collections of historic aircraft, including Neville Duke's world-record-breaking Hawker Hunter and a rare example of the rocket-engined Messerschmitt Me 163 B, Werknummer 191904 (since returned to Germany).

From 1966, the Skynet satellite communications system, a Signal Unit with its main base at RAF Oakhanger, had a detachment at Colerne.

Squadron	Equipment	From	To	Departed To	Notes
No. 24 Squadron RAF	Handley Page Hastings C.1	1 January 1957	5 January 1968	RAF Lyneham	
No. 36 Squadron RAF	Hastings C.1/C.2	1 September 1958	1 July 1967	RAF Lyneham	
No. 74 (Trinidad) Squadron RAF	Gloster Meteor F.3	15 February 1946; 9 June 1946	2 June 1946; 14 August 1946	RAF Bentwaters; RAF Horsham St Faith	
No. 114 (Hong Kong) Squadron RAF	Hastings C.1/C.2	13 April 1959	30 September 1961	Disbanded	Reformed here.
No. 245 (Northern Rhodesian) Squadron RAF	Meteor F.3	10 August 1945	18 February 1946	RAF Fairwood Common	Reformed here.
No. 511 Squadron RAF	Hastings C.1/C.2	1 May 1957	1 September 1958	Disbanded	
No. 662 Squadron RAF	Auster AOP 5/6/4	1 February 1949	10 March 1957	Disbanded	

The following units were here during the Cold War:

- No. 3 Air Experience Flight RAF (1993 – ?)
- No. 24 Group Communication Flight RAF (January 1960 – April 1964)
- No. 27 (Signals Training) Group RAF (September 1949 – July 1953)
- No. 27 Group Communication Flight RAF (September 1949 – July 1952)
- No. 62 Group Communication Flight RAF (January 1948 – July 1952) became Colerne Communication Squadron RAF (August 1942 – July 1957) absorbed by No. 81 Group Communication Flight RAF (January 1952 – April 1958)
- No. 92 Gliding School RAF (February 1948 – September 1955)
- Detachment of No. 228 Operational Conversion Unit RAF (January – May 1957)
- Detachment of No. 238 Maintenance Unit RAF (April 1956 – July 1958)
- No. 1335 (Meteor) Conversion Unit RAF (March – July 1945)
- No. 1956 Reserve Air Observation Post Flight RAF (February 1949 – March 1957)
- No. 1963 Reserve Air Observation Post Flight RAF (February 1949 – March 1957)
- Airborne Interception School RAF (June 1952) became 238 OCU
- Bristol University Air Squadron (November 1992 – ?)

=== British Army units ===
The site was used by the British Army as its training facility for the Junior Leaders Regiment of the Royal Corps of Transport and Royal Army Ordnance Corps. Young men from the age of 16 were trained in a variety of the skills needed to enable them to become better soldiers in the army. Basic driver training was done on simulators, and car driver training to licence level and motorcycle training were undertaken here.

The Regiment consisted of 30 (Junior Leader) Squadron RCT, 57 (Junior Leader) Squadron RCT and 90 (Junior Leader) Squadron RCT, together with 88 (Junior Leader) Coy RAOC.

Estranged from the regiment, at Driffield in Yorkshire, was 32 Driver Training Squadron RCT. Here, young soldiers were sent to the ASMT at Defence School of Transport (Leconfield) to be taught to drive the basic vehicles of the Army (typically a Land Rover and a 4-tonne lorry) and to qualify as Driver Trade B3 before being posted to a full-time working regiment where their technical trade training would be continued.

== Post-RAF use ==
After the RAF station closed in 1976, the site was taken over by the Army; occasional flying by Air Cadets continues. The airfield is expected to be closed in 2025.

== Units ==
The following units were here at some point:
- No. 10 Fighter Command Servicing Unit RAF
- 27th Fighter Squadron
- No. 39 Maintenance Unit RAF (January 1940 – October 1953)
- No. 1337 Wing RAF Regiment
- No. 2743 Squadron RAF Regiment
- No. 2750 Squadron RAF Regiment
- No. 2794 Squadron RAF Regiment
- No. 2800 Squadron RAF Regiment
- No. 2810 Squadron RAF Regiment

== See also ==
- List of Battle of Britain airfields
- List of Battle of Britain squadrons
