= No. 533 Squadron RAF =

- Active: 8 Sep 1942 – 25 Jan 1943
- Country: United Kingdom
- Branch: Royal Air Force
- Role: Turbinlite nightfighter squadron
- Part of: No. 10 Group RAF, Fighter Command

No. 533 Squadron RAF was one of the ten Turbinlite nightfighter squadrons of the Royal Air Force during the Second World War.

== History ==
No. 533 Squadron was formed at RAF Charmy Down, Somerset on 8 September 1942, from No. 1454 (Turbinlite) Flight, as part of No. 10 Group RAF in Fighter Command. Instead of operating only Turbinlite and – rudimentary – Airborne Intercept (AI) radar-equipped aircraft (Havocs and Bostons) and working together with a normal nightfighter unit, such as in their case with the Hawker Hurricanes of No. 87 Squadron RAF in the Flight, the unit now also flew with their own Hurricanes. It was disbanded at Charmy Down on 25 January 1943, when Turbinlite squadrons were, due to lack of success on their part and the rapid development of AI radar, thought to be superfluous.

== Aircraft operated ==
Aircraft operated by No. 533 Squadron RAF, data from
From	To	Aircraft	Version
8 September 1942	25 January 1943	Douglas Havoc	Mk.I (Turbinlite)
8 September 1942	25 January 1943	Douglas Havoc	Mk.I (Nightfighter)
8 September 1942	25 January 1943	Douglas Boston	Mk.III
8 September 1942	25 January 1943	Hawker Hurricane	Mk.IIb
8 September 1942	25 January 1943	Hawker Hurricane	Mk.IIc

== Squadron bases ==
Bases and airfields used by No. 533 Squadron RAF, data from
From	To	Base
8 September 1942	25 January 1943	RAF Charmy Down, Somerset

== Commanding officers ==
Officers commanding No. 533 Squadron RAF, data from
From	To	Name
September 1942	November 1942	S/Ldr. D.P. McKeown, AFC
November 1942	January 1943	unknown yet
