= RAF Debden =

Former Royal Air Force base in England

RAF Debden USAAF Station 356
- Near Debden, Essex in England
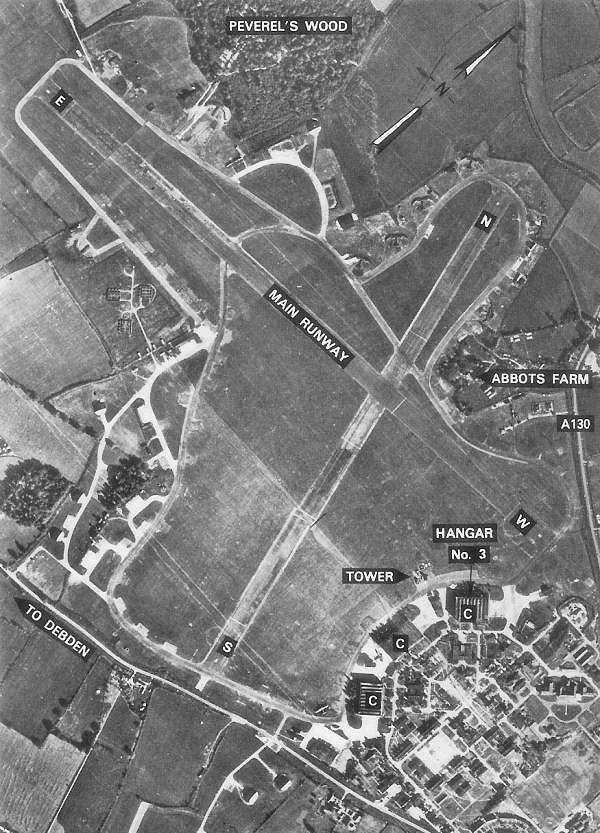
- Debden Airfield – 9 July 1946

Site information
- Type: Royal Air Force station Sector Station 1939-42
- Code: DB
- Owner: Air Ministry
- Operator: Royal Air Force; United States Army Air Forces; British Army
- Controlled by: RAF Fighter Command 1939-42 * No. 11 Group RAF; Eighth Air Force

Location
- Shown within Essex RAF Debden (the United Kingdom)
- Coordinates: 51°59′30″N 000°16′14″E

Site history
- Built: 1936/37
- Built by: W. & C. French Ltd
- In use: April 1937 – 1975
- Battles/wars: European theatre of World War II

Airfield information
- Elevation: 120 metres (394 ft) AMSL
Runways
Direction	Length and surface
00/00	Concrete/Tarmac
00/00	Concrete/Tarmac

Royal Air Force Debden or more simply RAF Debden is a former Royal Air Force station located 3 miles (4.8 km) southeast of Saffron Walden and approximately 1 mile (1.6 km) north of the village of Debden in north Essex, England.

== History ==
The airfield was opened in April 1937 and was first used by the Royal Air Force. One of Debden's early and most bizarre experiences was when the airfield was chosen as a location for the film It's in the Air in which George Formby was to pilot a Hawker Fury through Hangar No. 3. The rather sharper angle of the hangars at Debden built around the tarmac apron allowed free access at both ends of the end hangar. The flying for the sequence was actually done by Flying Officer R. H. A. Lee who disappeared on 18 August 1940 when he was last seen ten miles north of Foulness Point chasing three German aircraft out to sea.

=== RAF Fighter Command use ===
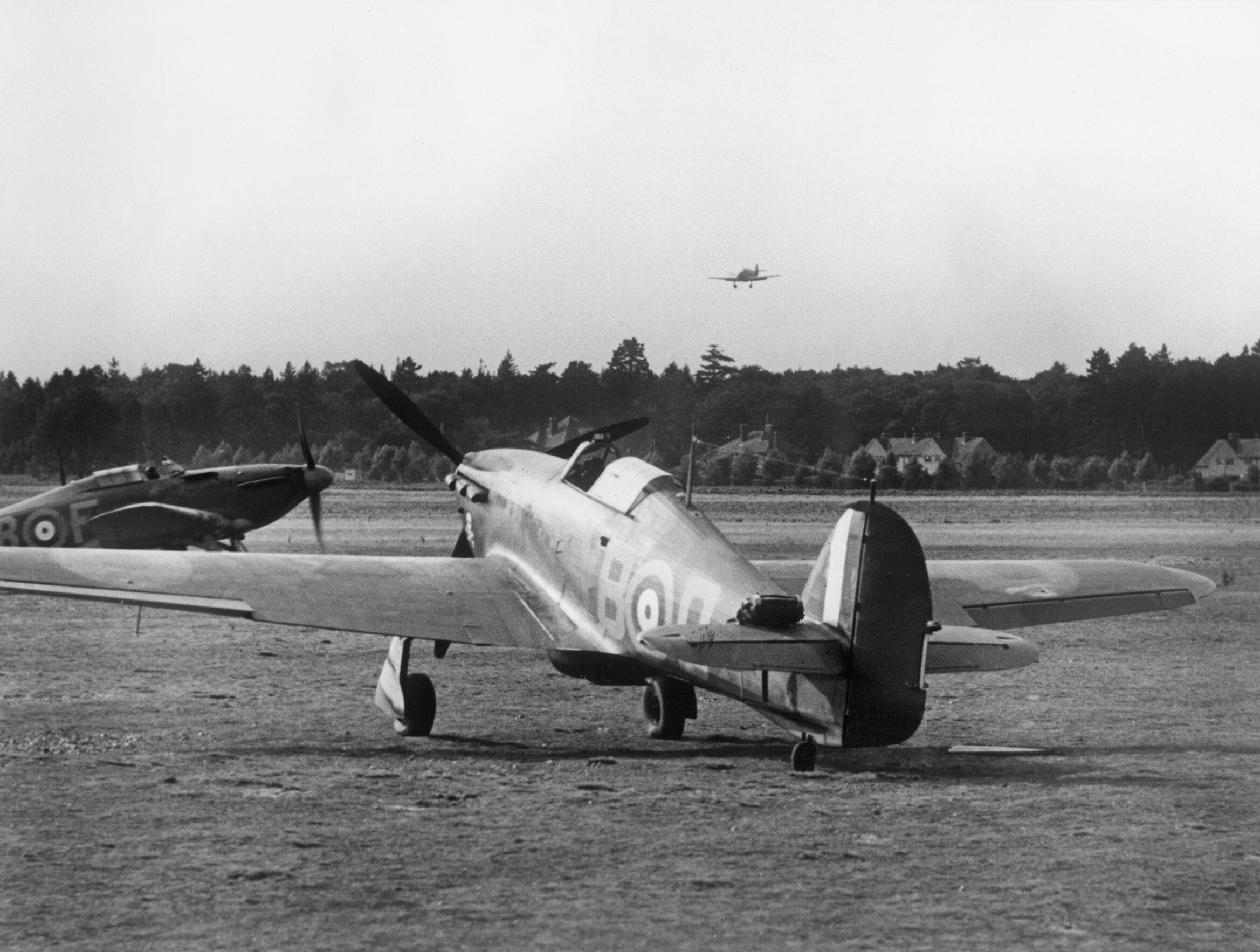
The Battle of Britain; Hawker Hurricanes of No. 17 Squadron on the ground at Debden, while another comes in to land, July 1940

Hard surface runways were laid in 1940. During the early years of the Second World War it was a Sector Station, with an Operations Block for No. 11 Group RAF during the Battle of Britain. Many different RAF units were posted to Debden, including No 17, 29, 65, 73, 80, 85, 87, 111, 157, 257, 418, 504 and 601 Squadrons.

The airfield was attacked several times during the Battle of Britain. The first air-raid sounded on 18 June 1940, although the first bombs were not dropped on the airfield until seven days later. Then, on 2 August, came a heavy attack which destroyed several buildings, killing five, to be followed by another severe raid on 31 August. During August and September, Debden fighters claimed seventy aircraft destroyed, thirty probables and forty-one damaged.

In 1970, Peter Townsend, the commander of 85 Squadron, which operated from Debden during the Battle of Britain, published a best-selling history of the Battle, Duel of Eagles.

On 28 January 1941, the station was visited by King George VI and Queen Elizabeth, and the following month by a German aircrew; it was on 4 February 1941 that a German pilot landed his aircraft and taxied to the watch office (control tower), at which point the German pilot must have realised his mistake as he took off in a hurry.

During May through into September 1942 Debden was used by No. 71 and 121 "Eagle Squadrons" with Supermarine Spitfire Vs.

Squadrons:

- No. 25 Squadron RAF between 8 October and 27 December 1940 with the Blenheim IF and the Beaufighter IF
- No. 41 Squadron RAF between 8 July and 1 August 1942 with the Spitfire VB
- No. 54 Squadron RAF between 11 and 13 June 1941 with the Spitfire VA
- No. 124 (Baroda) Squadron RAF between 29 July and 25 September 1942 with the Spitfire VI
- No. 129 (Mysore) Squadron RAF between 1 November and 22 December 1941 with the Spitfire VB
- Detachment from No. 219 (Mysore) Squadron RAF between October and December 1940 with the Blenheim IF and the Beaufighter IF
- No. 232 Squadron RAF between 20 August and 1 September 1942 with the Spitfire VB
- No. 258 Squadron RAF between 3 October and 1 November 1941 with the Hurricane IIA
- No. 264 (Madras Presidency) Squadron RAF between 27 November and 31 December 1940 with the Defiant I
- Detachment No. 287 Squadron RAF between 1941 and 1944 with multiple aircraft
- No. 303 Squadron RAF between 5 and 12 March 1943 with the Spitfire VB
- No. 350 (Belgian) Squadron RAF initially between 15 April and 30 June 1942 with the Spitfire VB then again between 5 and 13 March 1943 with the Spitfire VC
- No. 403 Squadron RCAF between 25 August and 3 October 1941 with the Spitfire VB
- No. 531 Squadron RAF between 2 and 9 October 1942 with multiple aircraft

Units

- No. 52 Operational Training Unit RAF (March - August 1941)
- No. 60 (Fighter) Wing RAF (August - September 1939 & May 1940)
- No. 2793 Squadron RAF Regiment
- No. 2798 Squadron RAF Regiment
- No. 2849 Squadron RAF Regiment

=== United States Army Air Forces use ===
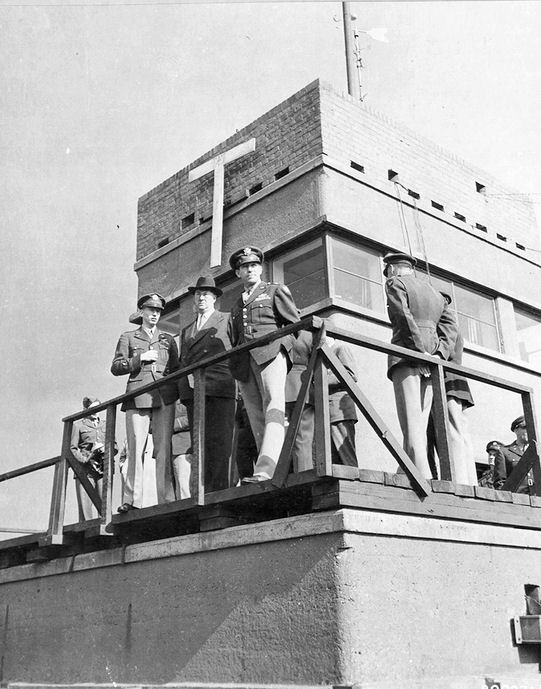
USAAF Personnel waiting for the return of 4th Fighter Group aircraft on the Debden Control Tower, 25 September 1943

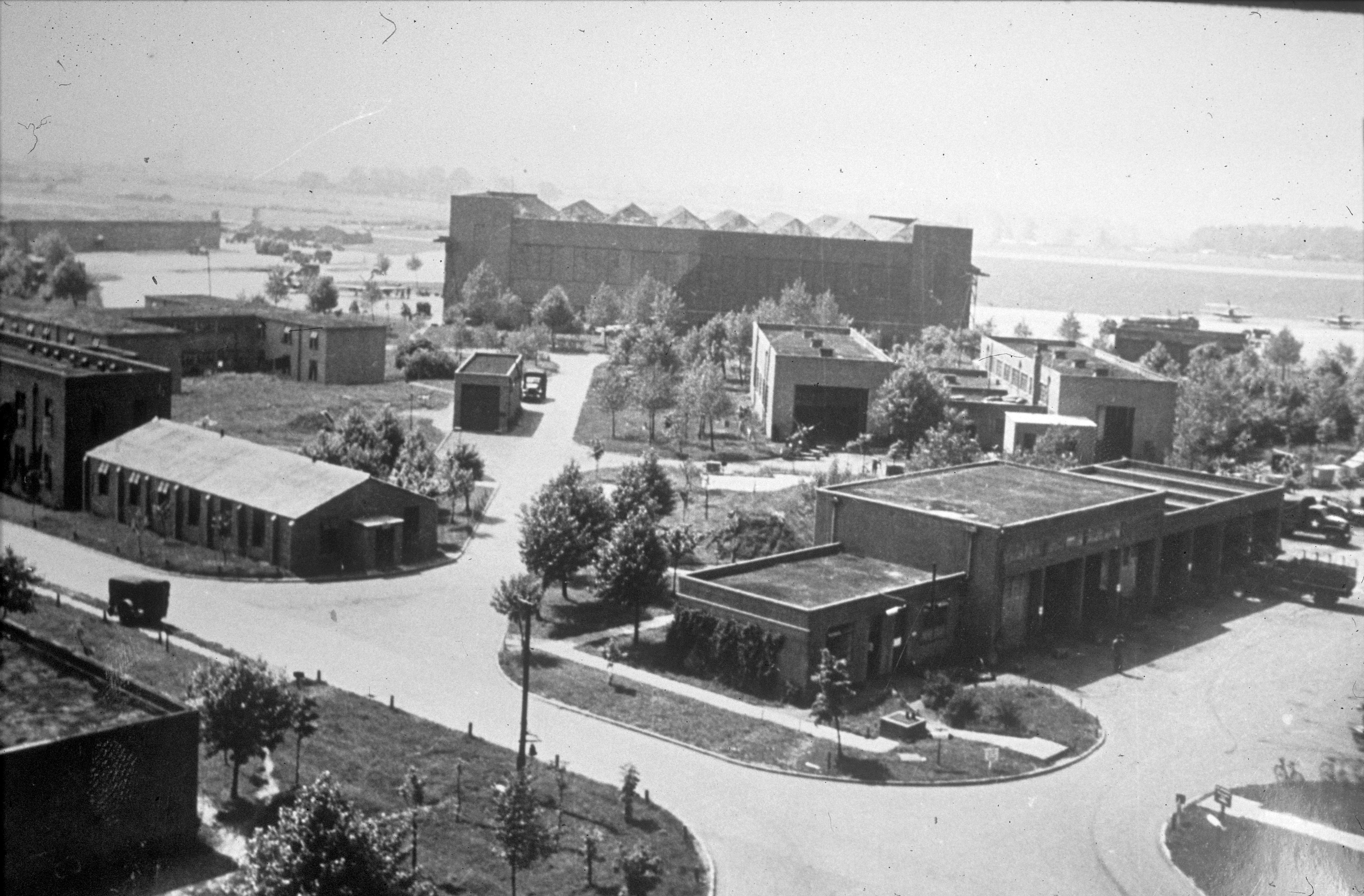
RAF Debden - Station Area with prewar Type-C hangar

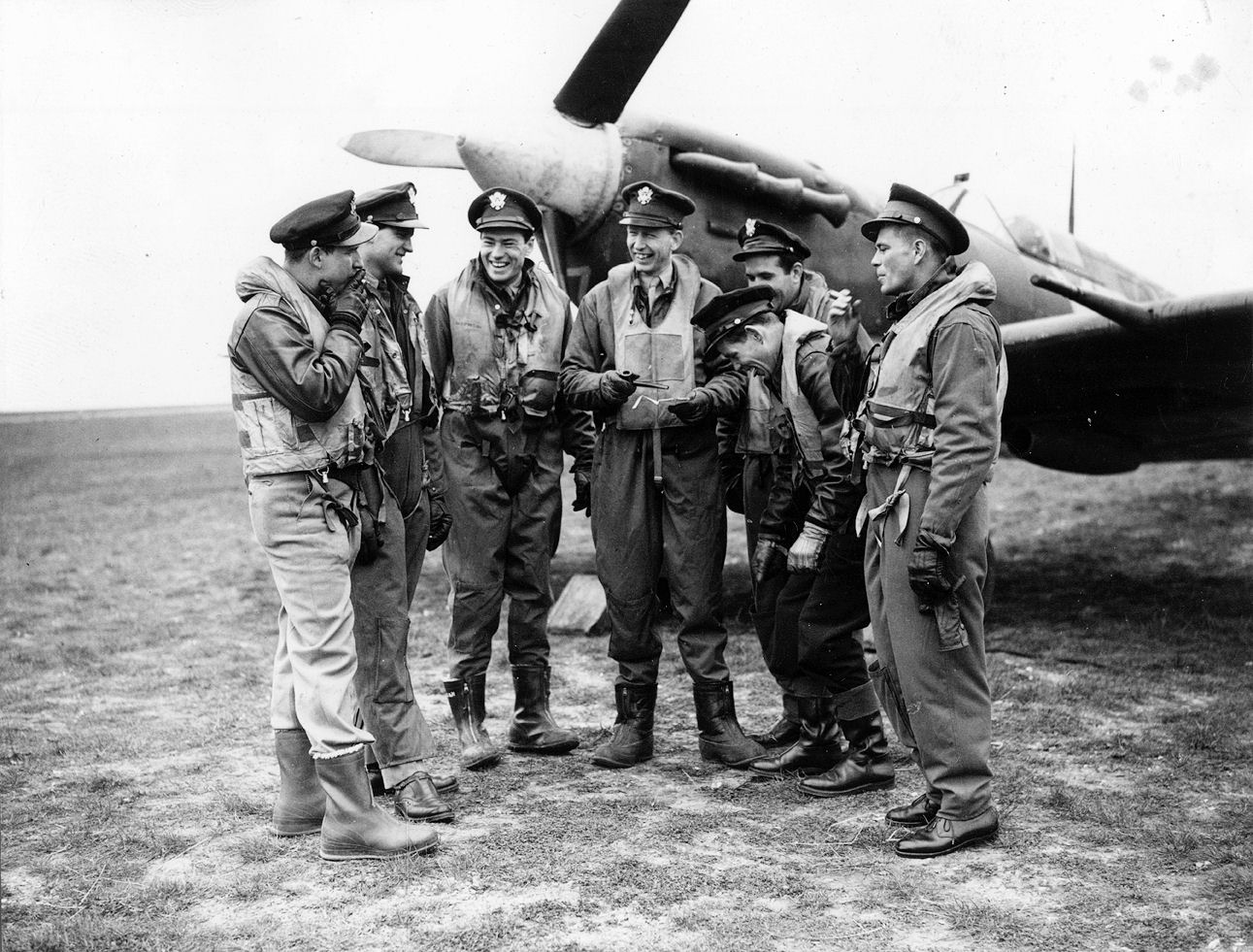
Former RAF Eagle Squadron pilots, now with the USAAF 4th Fighter Group sharing a smoke in front of a Spitfire at Debden

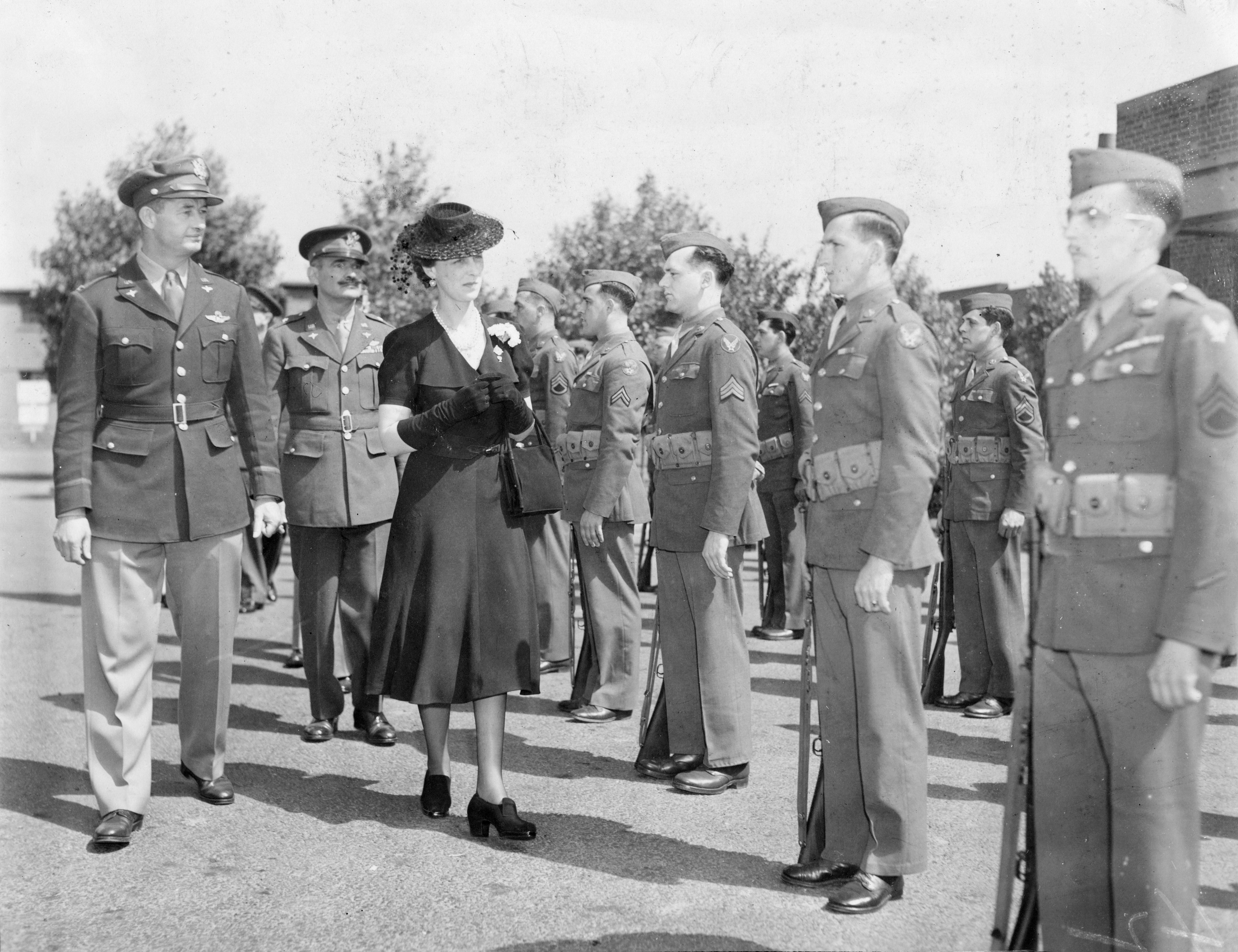
The Duchess of Kent inspects personnel of 4th Fighter Group during a royal visit to Debden, June 1943.

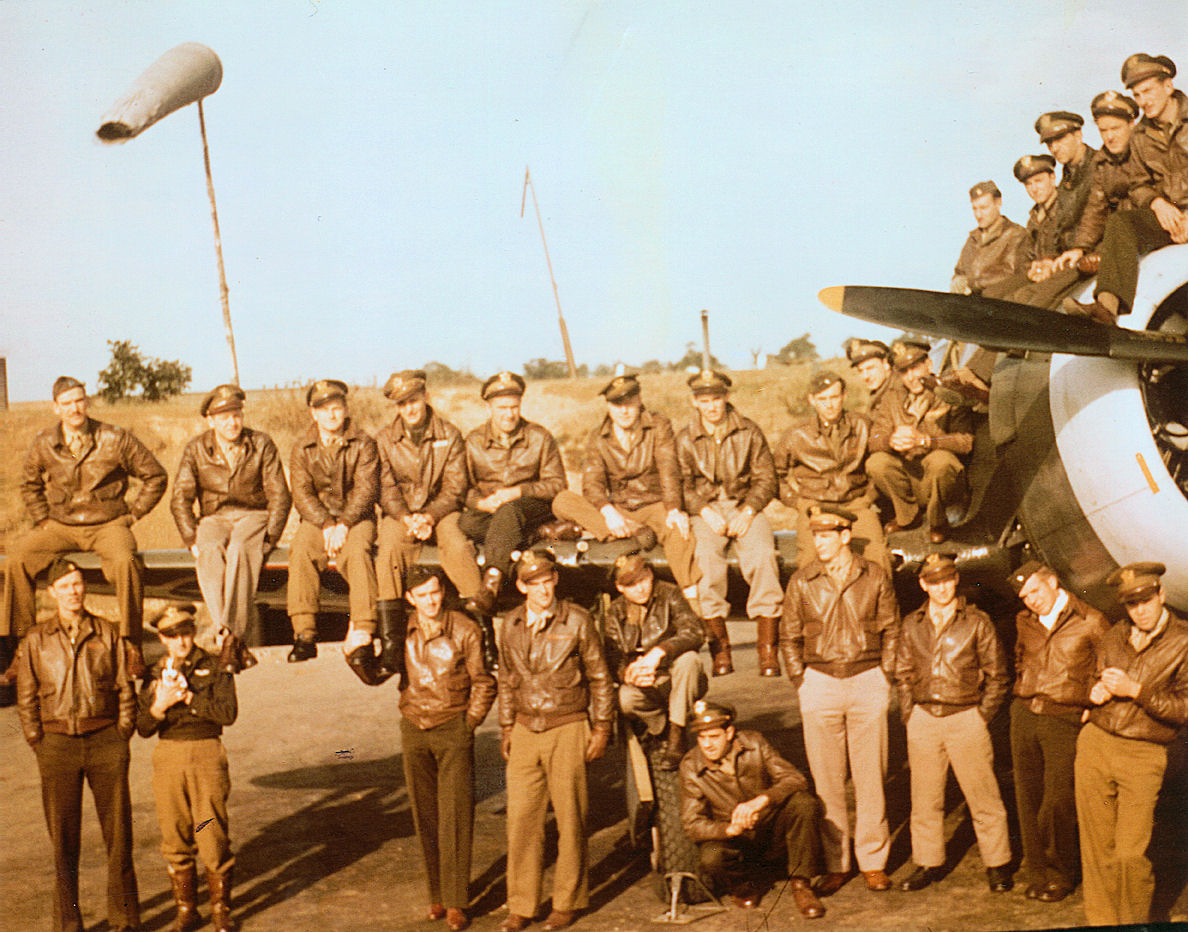
A large group of 4th Fighter Group pilots sitting on or standing in front of a P-47 Thunderbolt at Debden. The 4th Fighter Group flew P-47 Thunderbolts on missions between March 1943 and February 1944.

The airfield was transferred on 12 September 1942 to the United States Army Air Forces Eighth Air Force. Debden was assigned USAAF designation Station 356.

USAAF Station Units assigned to RAF Debden were:

- 33rd Service Group

41st and 45th Service Squadrons; HHS 33d Service Group

- 18th Weather Squadron
- 24th Station Complement Squadron
- 225th Anti-Aircraft Artillery Searchlight Battalion
- 1030th Signal Company
- 1063rd Military Police Company
- 1126th Quartermaster Company
- 1192nd Military Police Company
- 1770th Ordnance Supply & Maintenance Company
- 2119th Engineer Fire Fighting Platoon
- 546th Army Postal Unit

==== 4th Fighter Group ====
With the transfer of the airfield and the entry of the United States into the war, Americans serving in the RAF Eagle squadrons were transferred into the American ranks, with 71, 121 and 133 RAF Eagle Squadrons becoming the 4th Fighter Group. The group was under the command of the 65th Fighter Wing of the VIII Fighter Command. Aircraft of the group were identified by red around their cowlings and tails.

The group consisted of the following squadrons:

- 334th Fighter Squadron (QP) (Former 71 Squadron)
- 335th Fighter Squadron (WD) (Former 121 Squadron)
- 336th Fighter Squadron (VF) (Former 133 Squadron)

The 4th Fighter Group destroyed more enemy aircraft in the air and on the ground than any other fighter group of the Eighth Air Force. The group operated first with Supermarine Spitfires but changed to Republic P-47 Thunderbolts in March 1943 and to North American P-51 Mustangs in April 1944.

On numerous occasions the 4th FG escorted Boeing B-17 Flying Fortress and Consolidated B-24 Liberator bombers that were attacking factories, submarine pens, V-weapon sites, and other targets in France, the Low Countries, or Germany. The group went out sometimes with a small force of bombers to draw up the enemy's fighters so they could be destroyed in aerial combat. At other times the 4th attacked the enemy's air power by strafing and dive-bombing airfields. They also hit troops, supply depots, roads, bridges, rail lines, and trains.

The unit participated in the intensive campaign against the German Air Force and aircraft industry during Big Week, 20–25 February 1944. They received a Distinguished Unit Citation for aggressiveness in seeking out and destroying enemy aircraft and in attacking enemy air airfields during the period 5 March – 24 April 1944.

The 4th FG flew interdictory and counter-air missions during the invasion of Normandy in June 1944 and supported the airborne invasion of the Netherlands in September. They participated in the Battle of the Bulge, December 1944-January 1945, and provided cover for the airborne assault across the Rhine in March 1945.

In October 1944, No. 616 Squadron RAF, the first RAF jet unit, had a detachment of Gloster Meteors at Debden to practise affiliation tactics with the 4th Fighter Group.

With the cessation of hostilities, the group was briefly moved to RAF Steeple Morden in early July 1945, then on 10 November 1945 the group returned to the US and was inactivated at Camp Kilmer New Jersey.

=== Postwar Royal Air Force use ===
RAF Debden was returned to Royal Air Force control on 5 September 1945. Debden became a station of RAF Technical Training Command. Its first major occupant was the Empire Radio School from 7 March 1946. The schools operated Tiger Moths and Percival Proctors. As of 20 October 1949, became the Signals Division of the RAF Technical College. Thereafter, later, the Debden Division of the Royal Air Force Technical College.

The signals training activities were later being joined by a Bomb Disposal Unit and a Motor Transport Repair Unit.

Debden became home to No. 614 Volunteer Gliding School RAF (614 VGS) in 1966. The School remained at RAF Debden until the British Army required the airfield for tank training and the school was found a new home at RAF Wethersfield from June 1982.

In 1967 Debden became an overspill training centre for civilian police covered by No. 5 district.

On 18 October 1973 a Nissen hut, officially designated Building 210 which had been used by the 4th Fighter Group during the war was presented to the USAF to be flown to Wright-Patterson Air Force Base, Ohio, to be re-assembled and displayed in the National Museum of the U.S. Air Force.

The RAF Police School had moved to Debden in 1960 and the unit became The RAF Police Depot. From 1968, the Provost & Security Support Squadron was also based at Debden. In the 1960s, the Unit also trained members of the Air Force Department Constabulary (until that force was amalgamated into the Ministry of Defence Police). On 5 June 1973, RAF Debden was subject of a Royal Review by Princess Margaret. The RAF Police Dog School had moved to Debden from Netheravon in 1962. Apart from RAF Police, the Dog School also trained UK-based USAF Police to handle RAF Police Dogs. The School hosted the RAF Police Dog Demonstration Team which, apart from its appearances over many years in the UK, toured America in September 1969. In 1974, the RAF Police School moved to RAF Newton, Nottinghamshire, whilst the Dog School remained at Debden. In July 1975, the RAF Police Dog School hosted Debden's final RAF Police Dog Trials before the Dog School also moved to join the rest of RAF Police Training at RAF Newton in late Summer 1975. The station officially closed on 21 August 1975.

Units

- 651 Light Aircraft Squadron until 1 March 1961
- No. 27 Group RAF Communication Flight (September 1947 - September 1949)
- Headquarters, No. 27 (Signals Training) Group RAF (September 1947 - September 1949)
- Technical Training Command Major Servicing Flight (November 1947 - December 1948) became Technical Training Command Major Servicing Unit (December 1948 - December 1954)

=== British Army ===
After the RAF left the site became Carver Barracks. Due to its postwar use, the airfield and technical site is almost completely intact from its Second World War configuration, although all but one of the three Type-C hangars made famous by Formby have now been demolished on the main airfield and two other hangars remaining to the south of the main site. Hangar 3 was demolished after 1988, after the Royal Armoured Corps moved away from Carver Barracks.

== See also ==
- List of former Royal Air Force stations
