= Type-C hangar =

Aircraft hangar type used by the Royal Air Force

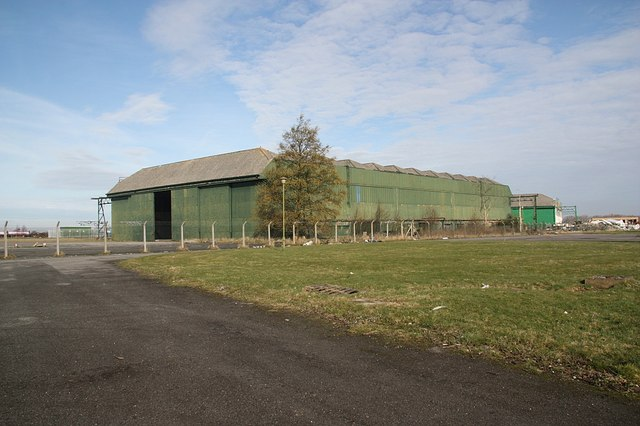
- Type-C hangar at the former RAF Binbrook
- Alternative names: Aeroplane Shed - Type "C"

General information
- Type: Aircraft hangar
- Location: Various
- Construction started: c. 1934
- Construction stopped: c. 1940s
- Governing body: Air Ministry (when built)
- Affiliation: Royal Air Force

Height
- Height: 35 feet (11 m)

Dimensions
- Other dimensions: 300 feet (91 m) (length); 152 feet (46 m) (width)

Technical details
- Material: Steel, concrete, brick

Design and construction
- Designations: (some) Grade II Listed

The Type-C hangar is a specific design of aircraft hangar built by the Royal Air Force during its expansion period of the 1930s. The hangar type generally measured 300 feet (91 m) in length, with a width of 152 feet 5 inches (46.46 m), and a clear height of 35 feet 4 inches (10.77 m). Whilst the type was designed, built and used during the expansion programme, installation of type-C hangars continued into the Second World War. By 1944, it was determined that in 64 RAF expansion period airfields, which were open at that time, at least one type-C hangar was present.

== Design ==
Prior to the RAF Expansion Period of the 1930s, the largest hangar in RAF service was the Type-A, which measured 250 feet (76 m) in length, 120 feet (37 m) in width, 25 feet (7.6 m) in height, and had set of doors at one end only. During the expansion period, when permanent airfields were being constructed, it was deemed adequate for each squadron to have two Type-C hangars with annexes, in order to provide the necessary maintenance and storage space. The development of the 'C' Hangar was down to the design team of the Directorate General of Works, with a basic design registered as 2029/34 and labelled as Aeroplane Shed - Type "C". Larger bomber airframes dictated a hangar design that could accommodate aircraft with a wingspan of 100 feet (30 m), and also having doors at either end of the hangar. Many hangars had offices or workshops attached to one side of the building; these were built to a width of 17 feet (5.2 m) and had differing designs.

Three sets of steel doors - 35 feet (11 m) high, were aligned at each end of the hangar, and were set into rails in the concrete floor. Each steel door consisted of steel sheets with a space between them; during wartime, this space was filled up to 20 feet (6.1 m) high with gravel as an anti-shrapnel feature should the hangar suffer from a bombing raid. The walls of the hangars were constructed either from brickwork (to a depth of 14 inches (360 mm)), or from reinforced concrete, 12 inches (300 mm) thick.

Type-C hangar diagram

The earlier sheds had gabled roofs, with an upright block at each end, and a few of these were built around the country (RAF Mildenhall was notable in having three of the type.) However, later examples had a sloping end roof (hipped), and some were built to a shorter length, the standard being described as having 12 bays. As most hangars were 300 feet (91 m) in length, each bay represented 25 feet (7.6 m). Whilst the height of 35 feet (11 m) was excessive for those hangars on Fighter Command stations, the chance that the station could be re-roled to Bomber Command was easier to accomplish if needed without having to rebuild the hangars. However, once aircraft design had stabilised, a height of 30 feet (9.1 m) was found to be adequate, and so later hangars built towards the end of the expansion period were not as high as the earlier structures. The height of the hangars could be a mistake in the wrong environment; in September 1939, RAF Wick opened with four C1 hangars. As Wick was built on a treeless plain, the hangars were visible from miles away, which has led to some suggesting the hangars attracted the high number of air-raids that the base suffered. When it became apparent that the C1 hangars could not be built quickly enough post the outbreak of the Second World War, many airfields after this date were equipped with the Type-J hangar, which could be erected in a shorter timeframe.

By the end of 1944, 64 RAF airfields had at least one Type-C hangar. Most of these were airfields that had been built, or substantially improved during the expansion period of the 1930s. One example being RAF Waddington, which opened in 1916, and survived through the 1920s, having Type-C hangars built in the mid 1930s. Later examples, such as those at RAF Leeming in North Yorkshire (shown in the image below), were also known as the "Austerity" type, as these were built without the concrete or brick cladding of the 1930s build types (Leeming did not open until 1940). The original brickwork cladding the outside of the hangars would be in keeping with the brick built nature of the other structures on the base, and would also hopefully blend into the environment.

=== Variants ===
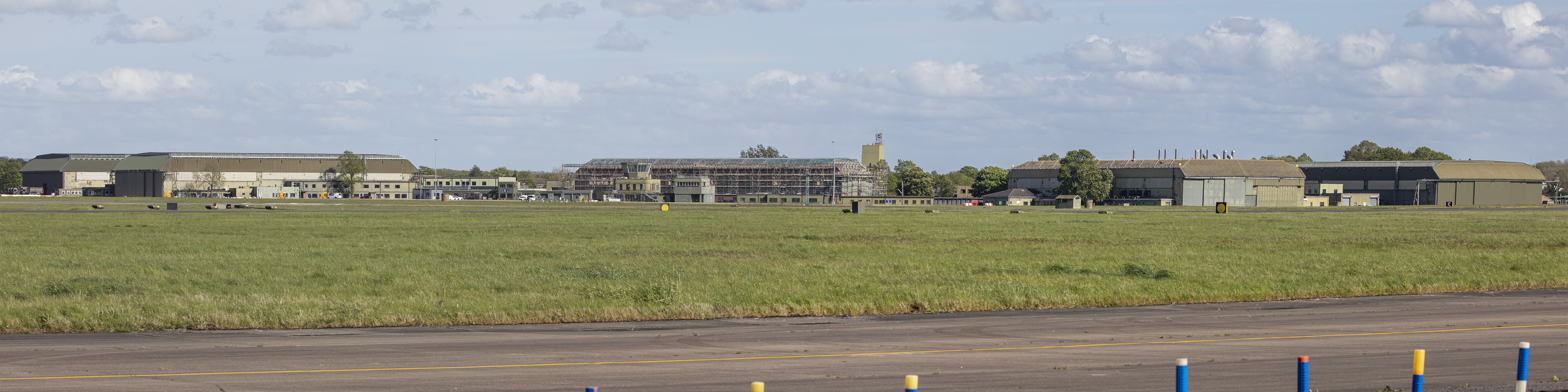
A panorama of the five type-C hangars at RAF Leeming in North Yorkshire

Both RAF St Athan and RAF Sealand were designated as Aircraft Repair Depots (ARDs), with space for engine repair workshops. Due to the nature of their work, some of the Type-C hangars at those locations were extended to be 400 feet (120 m) in length, and 200 feet (61 m) in width. Early 1934 era hangars had gabled roofs, which were soon changed to a hipped roof design. Later variants, known as the Austerity style (but classified as C1 by the RAF), had no brick cladding, being entirely built from concrete and steel. These were deemed to be less attractive in the surrounding area, but were able to be erected in a shorter time frame. Smaller hangars were built to demand at particular stations such as Church Fenton, Lee-on-Solent, and Wittering (intended for use by Fighter Command), which had three nine-bay hangars instead of the normal twelve-bay types.

Whilst the overall design followed the same format, various different drawings existed, but these related to the size of the hangars, workshop accommodation, and offices provided along the length of the structure. Other C hangars were designed as a slender type with only two sets of end doors, instead of the normal three sets. These were located at RAF Catterick, RAF Little Rissington, RAF Manby, RAF Shawbury, and RAF Wittering, and intended as aircraft repair depots. Cross beams affixed to the roof structure were capable of lifting a 6-tonne (6.6-ton) load.

== Listed structures ==
Whilst some are still in use by the RAF and the USAF, most hangars are on former airfields. However, some have been listed with Historic England. One example is that of the hangar at RAF Northolt which until the early part of the 21st century, was used by No. 32 Squadron for its aircraft. It was built in 1936, and during the Second World War, housed the aircraft for ferrying Winston Churchill around the world. Historic England listed the structure as it was an early design of the Type-C, and is the only hangar on the Northolt estate which survives from the Battle of Britain era.

All four Type-C hangars at RAF Scampton are grade II listed, due to their association with No. 617 Sqn and Operation Chastise, the Dambusters raid. Buildings at the former RAF bases at Kinloss, Leuchars and Turnhouse in Scotland, are registered with Canmore, the National Record of the Historic Environment.

== Locations ==
By 2001, over 200 Type-C hangars were still in existence, though most were not under MoD control. Places known to have had Type-C hangars are listed below. The number in brackets dictates how many were built on site - normally this was four or five, for stations on an operational footing, but only one type-C hangar was built at Aircraft Storage Units (ASUs), such as RAF Kirkbride. RAF Coltishall opened in 1938, and was intended to have five hangars, however, hangar no. 5 was destroyed by enemy action whilst still being built, and so never completed.

- RAF Abingdon (1)
- RAF Aldergrove (4) (one demolished in 2015)
- RAF Aston Down (1)
- RAF Bassingbourn (4)
- RAF Benson (4)
- RAF Bicester (2)
- RAF Binbrook (5)
- RAF Bircham Newton (3)
- RAF Bramcote (5)
- RAF Brize Norton (4)
- RAF Burtonwood (4)
- RAF Castle Bromwich (1)
- RAF Catterick (4)
- RAF China Bay (2, both damaged by enemy action, only one was repaired)
- RAF Church Fenton (2 shorter versions, intended as a fighter base)
- RAF Coltishall (4)
- RAF Cosford (airfield site x 2)
- RAF Cottesmore (4)
- RAF Cranfield (4)
- RAF Cranwell (2)
- RAF Debden (3)
- RAF Digby (2)
- RAF Dishforth (5)
- RAF Driffield (5 - one destroyed by enemy action in 1940)
- RAF Feltwell (5)
- RAF Finningley (5)
- RAF Gosport (1 - added in the 1930s)
- RAF Habbaniya (1)
- RAF Hemswell (4)
- RAF Honington (5)
- RAF Hornchurch (1)
- RAF Horsham St Faith (5)
- RAF Hullavington (4)
- RAF Kemble (1)
- RAF Kinloss (3)
- RAF Kirkbride (1)
- RAF Kirton in Lindsey (3)
- RAF Leconfield (5)
- RAF Leeming (5)
- RNAS Lee-on-Solent (HMS Daedalus) (1 - was RAF Lee-on-Solent until 1939)
- RAF Leuchars (4)
- RAF Lindholme (5)
- RAF Linton-on-Ouse (5)
- RAF Little Rissington (4)
- RAF Lossiemouth (3)
- RAF Manby (5)
- RAF Marham (5)
- RAF Middleton St George (1)
- RAF Middle Wallop (5)
- RAF Mildenhall (3, one was demolished in 2011)
- RAF Newton (5)
- RAF Northolt (4)
- RAF Odiham (3)
- RAF St Athan (4)
- RAF St Eval (3)
- RAF Scampton (4)
- RAF Shawbury (4)
- RAF Sealand (3)
- RAF Silloth (3)
- RAF South Cerney (3)
- RAF Tern Hill (4)
- RAF Thornaby (2)
- RAF Thorney Island (6)
- RAF Topcliffe (5)
- RAF Turnhouse (1)
- RAF Upavon (1)
- RAF Upwood (4)
- RAF Waddington (5)
- RAF Wattisham (4)
- RAF Watton (4)
- RAF West Raynham (4)
- RAF Wick (4)
- RAF Wittering (4)
- RAF Wroughton (2)
- RAF Wyton (4)
