= No. 286 Squadron RAF =

- Active: 17 November 1941 – 16 May 1945
- Country: United Kingdom
- Branch: Royal Air Force
- Role: Anti-aircraft Co-operation
- Motto(s): Latin: Praesidia Nostra Exercemus ("We exercise our defences")

Insignia
- Squadron Badge heraldry: In front of a three-bladed propeller, a grenade fired
- Squadron Codes: NW (Nov 1941 – May 1945)

No. 286 Squadron RAF was a non-operational Second World War Royal Air Force squadron that operated a variety of aircraft to provide targets for anti-aircraft gun practice in the West Country of England.

== History ==
The squadron was formed at RAF Filton on 17 November 1941 from No. 10 Group AAC Flight. From 24 January 1942, it was headquartered at newly operational RAF Lulsgate Bottom. However, as the facilities there were still unfinished, from 2 March to 30 April the headquarters used RAF Colerne. It returned to Lulsgate only briefly before leaving for RAF Zeals on 26 May.

The squadron served at various locations and detachments around the West Country before finally moving to RAF Weston Zoyland, where it was disbanded on 16 May 1945.

== Aircraft operated ==
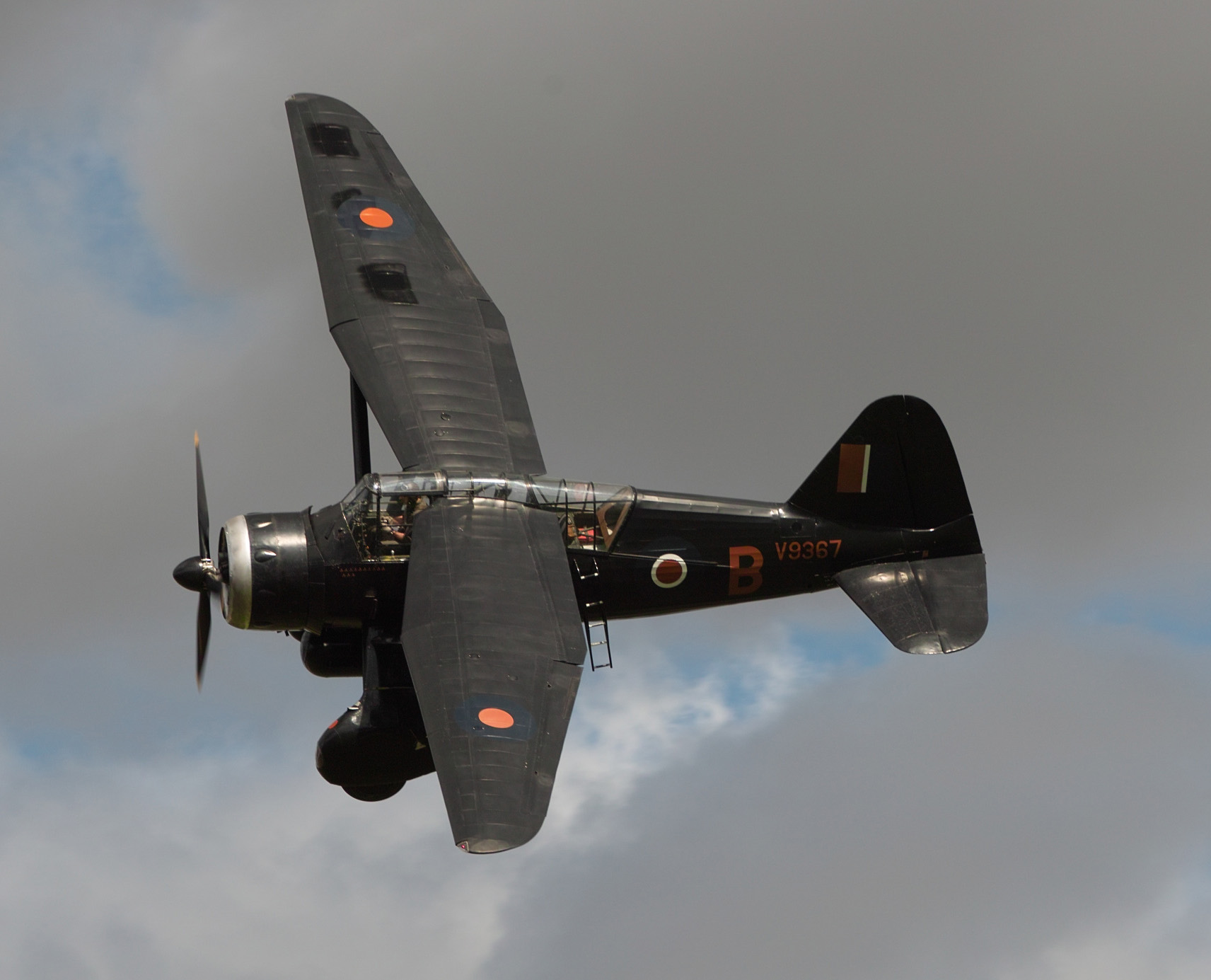
Westland Lysander

Aircraft operated by No. 286 Squadron
From	To	Aircraft	Variant	Notes
Nov 1941	Jan 1942	Westland Lysander	Mk.II	
Nov 1941	Jun 1943	Hawker Hurricane	Mk.I	
Nov 1941	Jul 1944	Boulton-Paul Defiant	Mks.I, III	
Nov 1941	May 1945	Airspeed Oxford	Mks.I, II	
Apr 1942	May 1945	Hawker Hurricane	Mks.IIc, IV	
Jul 1943	Dec 1944	Miles Martinet	Mk.I	
Nov 1944	Mar 1945	Miles Master	Mk.III	
