= Operation Oyster =

1942 RAF raid on a factory in the Netherlands

- Part of the Second World War
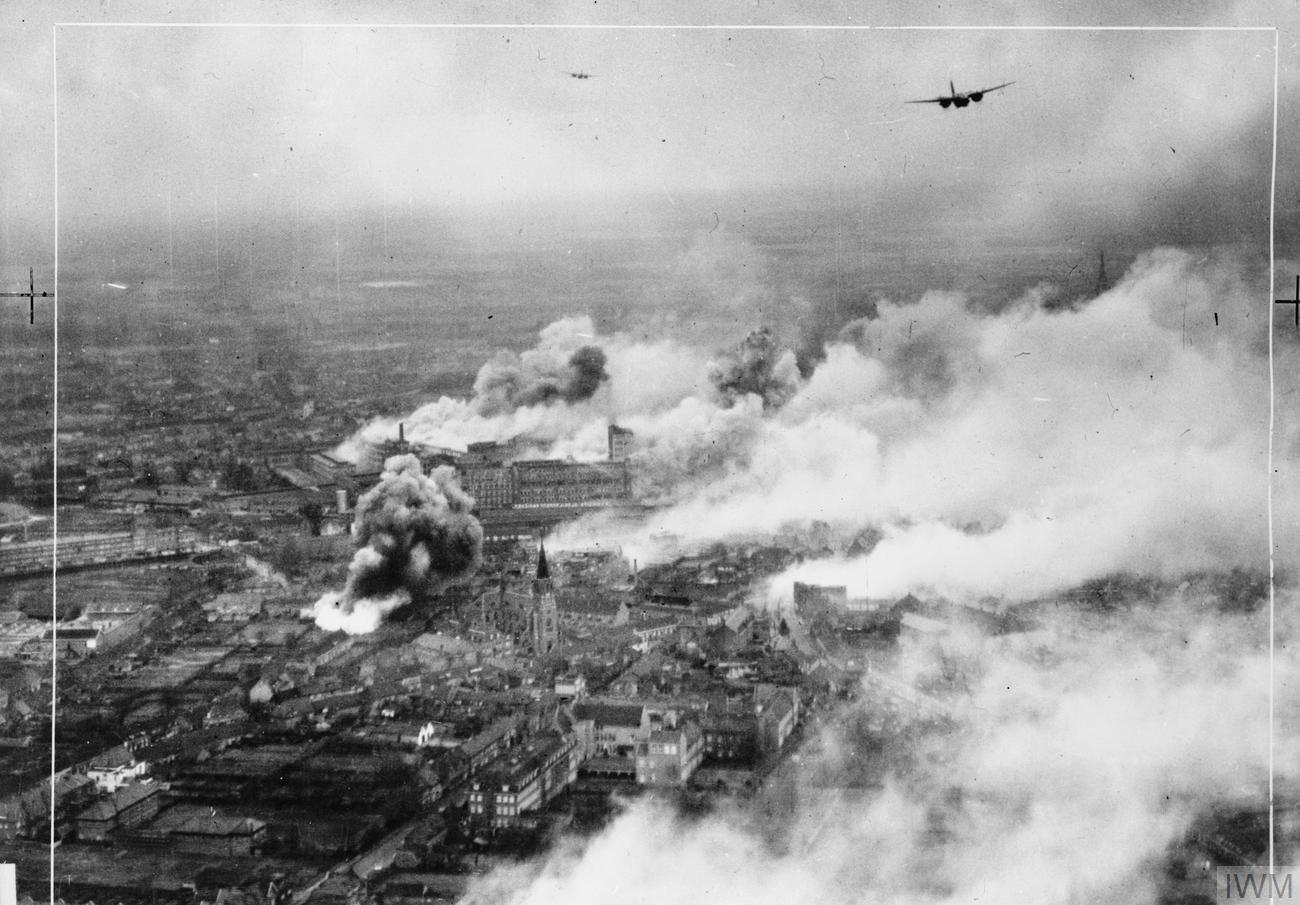
- Bostons fly past the burning Philips Emmasingel plant during the Eindhoven raid
Date	6 December 1942
Location	Eindhoven, Netherlands
Result	Allied victory

Belligerents
United Kingdom	(Nazi Germany) Germany

Commanders and leaders
James Pelly-Fry	

Strength
93 light bombers; 47 Venturas; 36 Bostons; 10 Mosquitos	

Casualties and losses
c. 150 civilians killed; 62 aircrew; 15 aircraft lost; 57 damaged	1 Fw 190 (against a diversion); 7 killed; Philips works severely damaged

Operation Oyster was a bombing raid made by the Royal Air Force (RAF) on 6 December 1942 upon the Philips works at Eindhoven in the Netherlands. The Philips company was a big producer of electronic equipment, including vacuum tubes for radio communication. Prior to the Battle of the Netherlands in 1940, Philips was known to be a leading research firm in infrared and radar technology. To ensure accuracy and minimise casualties among the Dutch citizens, the raid had to be undertaken during the day.

Eindhoven was beyond the range of the fighter escort and the four-engined night bombers that made up the bulk of RAF Bomber Command were considered to be too vulnerable for the attack. No. 2 Group RAF contained the medium day bombers of the RAF and was selected for the raid. To improve their chances of survival, diversionary raids were organised to mislead the German defenders. Almost all of 2 Group was committed to the raid and it was the largest and most successful operation by the group of the war.

== Background ==
=== Philips, Eindhoven ===
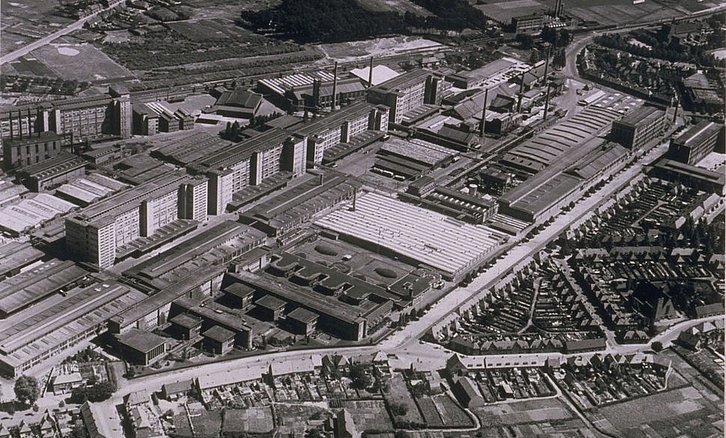
Philips Strijp works in Eindhoven, mid 1930s

In April 1942 the Air Ministry, in consultation with the Ministry of Economic Warfare, produced a list of the highest value targets in the occupied countries. Eight targets within range of the RAF were identified. The Philips radio and vacuum tube factory in Eindhoven was made the priority target, considered as important as any target in Germany. Philips was a leading firm in electronics and a big employer in Eindhoven, where production was performed at the massive Strijp works, and the smaller Emmasingel works, half a mile away to the south-east.

Prior to the war Philips made major advances in the design and production of vacuum tubes and had some of the best research scientists in the world. An appraisal by the Air Ministry estimated that the plants in Eindhoven produced a third of the radio tubes used in German military equipment. It was feared that the firm was being used to perform research into electronic counter-measures and radar technology.

The location of the Philips works in the middle of a Dutch city precluded Bomber Command from putting on a big night raid, as this would result in a great many civilian casualties. For accurate bombing the target would have to be attacked during the day. The raid resulted in about 150 civilian casualties. Being 70 mi (110 km) inland, Eindhoven was beyond the range of fighter escort. Using Lancaster bombers for the raid was considered and rejected, as they were too vulnerable to fly through the middle of the German fighter belt in daylight. The use of de Havilland Mosquitos was also considered but the Philips works was too large a target for the payload the Mosquitos available could carry.

=== 2 Group ===
No. 2 Group RAF was the sole day bomber group of RAF Bomber Command and consisted of ten medium bomber squadrons stationed on airfields in Norfolk. The group flew with Fighter Command in operations against the Luftwaffe. Daylight raids with small formations attacked shipping, targets on the coast and in northern France. The raids were flown at medium altitudes through the German fighter defences but the two large Philips plants in Eindhoven could not be destroyed by the typical twelve-aircraft formations used in Circus raids. Bomber Command elected to commit all ten squadrons of 2 Group to the raid but this meant using four types of medium bomber; the Lockheed Ventura, Douglas Boston, North American B-25 Mitchell and de Havilland Mosquito, with inconsistent performances. It was the most ambitious raid ever put on by 2 Group and approval for the raid was given on 9 November 1942 as Operation Oyster.

== Prelude ==
=== Training ===
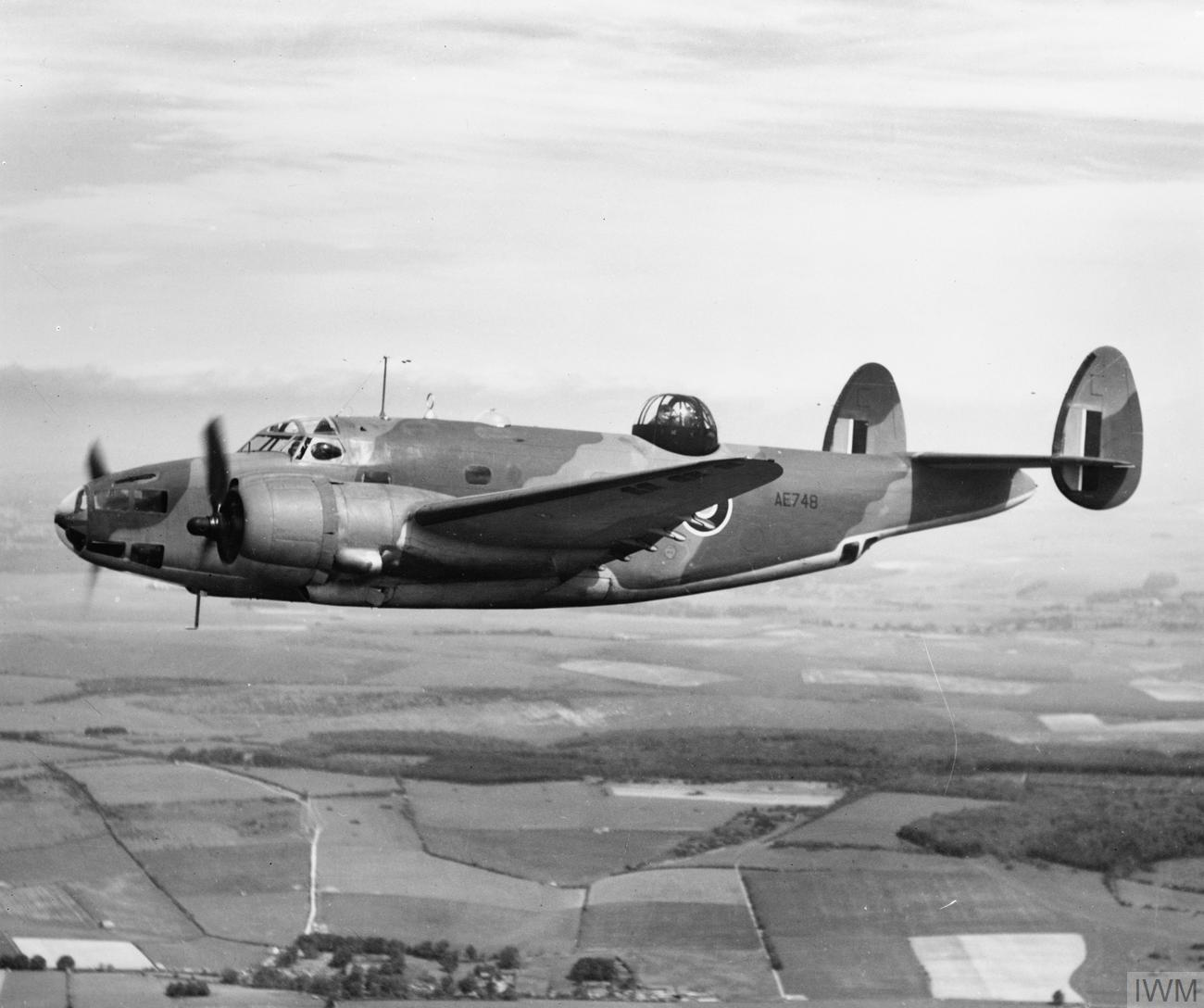
A Lockheed Ventura being tested at Boscombe Down

The first full scale practice was held on 17 November. The Ventura crews soon learned that the backwash off the paddled blades of the other Venturas made their planes liable to skid and difficult to control; flying so low left no time for recovery. Any mistake they made could quickly lead to them flying into the North Sea or the ground. The pilot had to be very attentive to stay on station, focused on the wing or tail of the aircraft before him. The lead pilot had to be aware of the trailing aircraft, accounting for their position with each manoeuvre he made. While flying low over Holland the pilots and navigators would have to keep a sharp eye out for obstructions. Birds on the coast tended to be larger, and when startled by the noise of an aircraft engine they would take off into the air. The risk of bird strikes was one of 2 Group's greatest dangers.

The initial plan was for the Venturas to attack first, followed by Bostons at one target and Mitchells and Mosquitos at the other. All aircraft would fly at low level until right before the target, when they would climb to 1,500 ft (460 m) to attack in a shallow dive. The first trial was disappointing, aircraft arrived over the target from different directions and at different times. The Venturas arrived over the target in a ragged fashion. It was apparent that time was needed for the aircraft to form up into groups by type. It was also apparent the Mitchell crews were simply not ready to fly a raid this demanding in air discipline. It was realised that if the Venturas attacked first with incendiaries, smoke from the fires they started would obscure the target for the following aircraft.

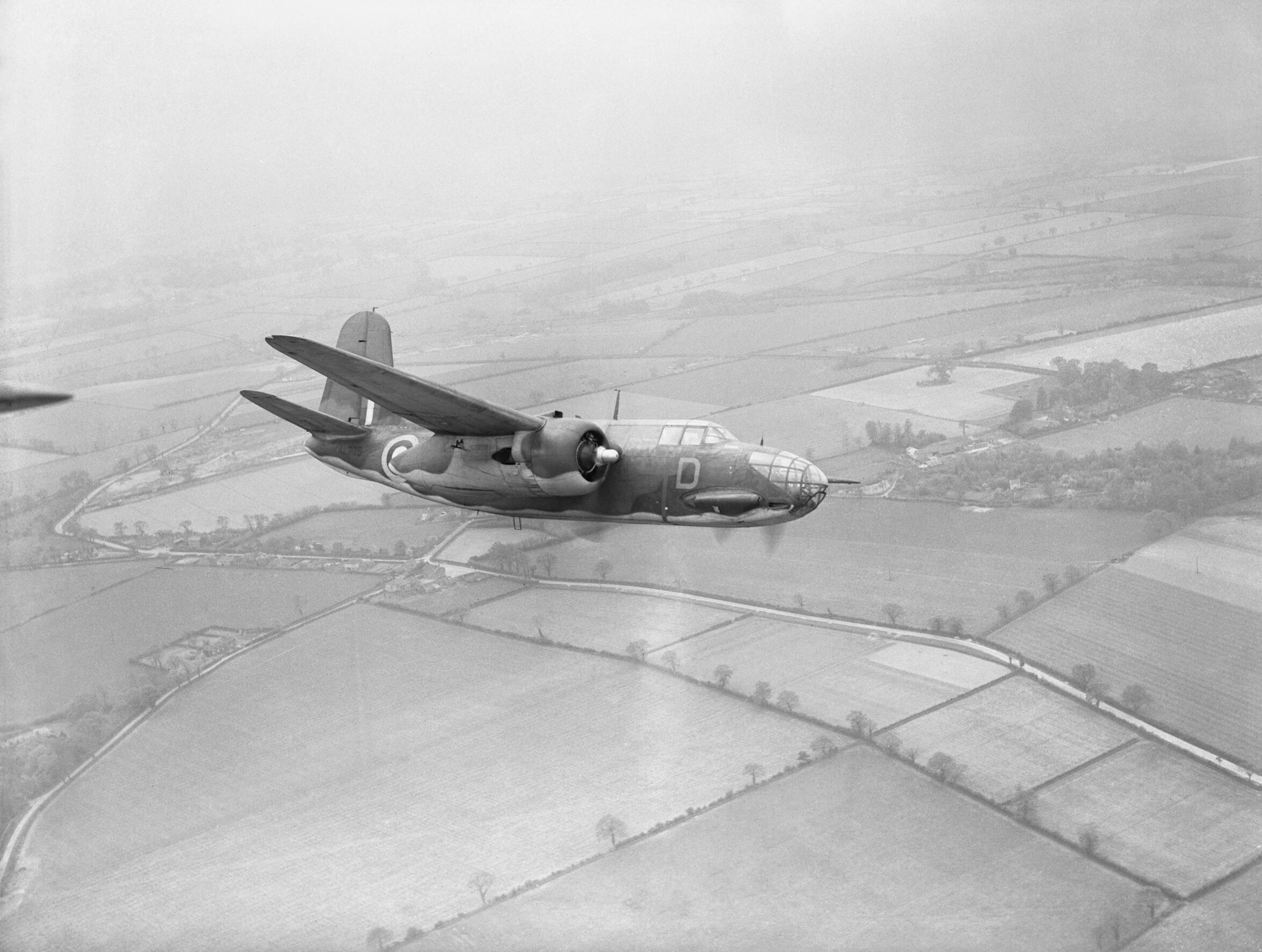
Training flight over England for a pair of Douglas Bostons

The order of the attacking aircraft was changed, the Bostons to attack first, followed by the Mitchells and Mosquitos, with the Venturas arriving last. Take-off times were also pushed forward to allow the aircraft more time to orbit and form up. A second trial run by the Venturas the next day was much better. Between exercises crews practised bombing at low level, 1,000 ft (300 m) and 1,500 ft (460 m) in all manner of formations in pairs and combinations of three pairs. A third trial run with all forces on 20 November was much better but the Mitchell squadrons, 98 and 180, were removed from the raid as their crews were still too inexperienced. This brought the force down to eight squadrons.

=== Plan ===
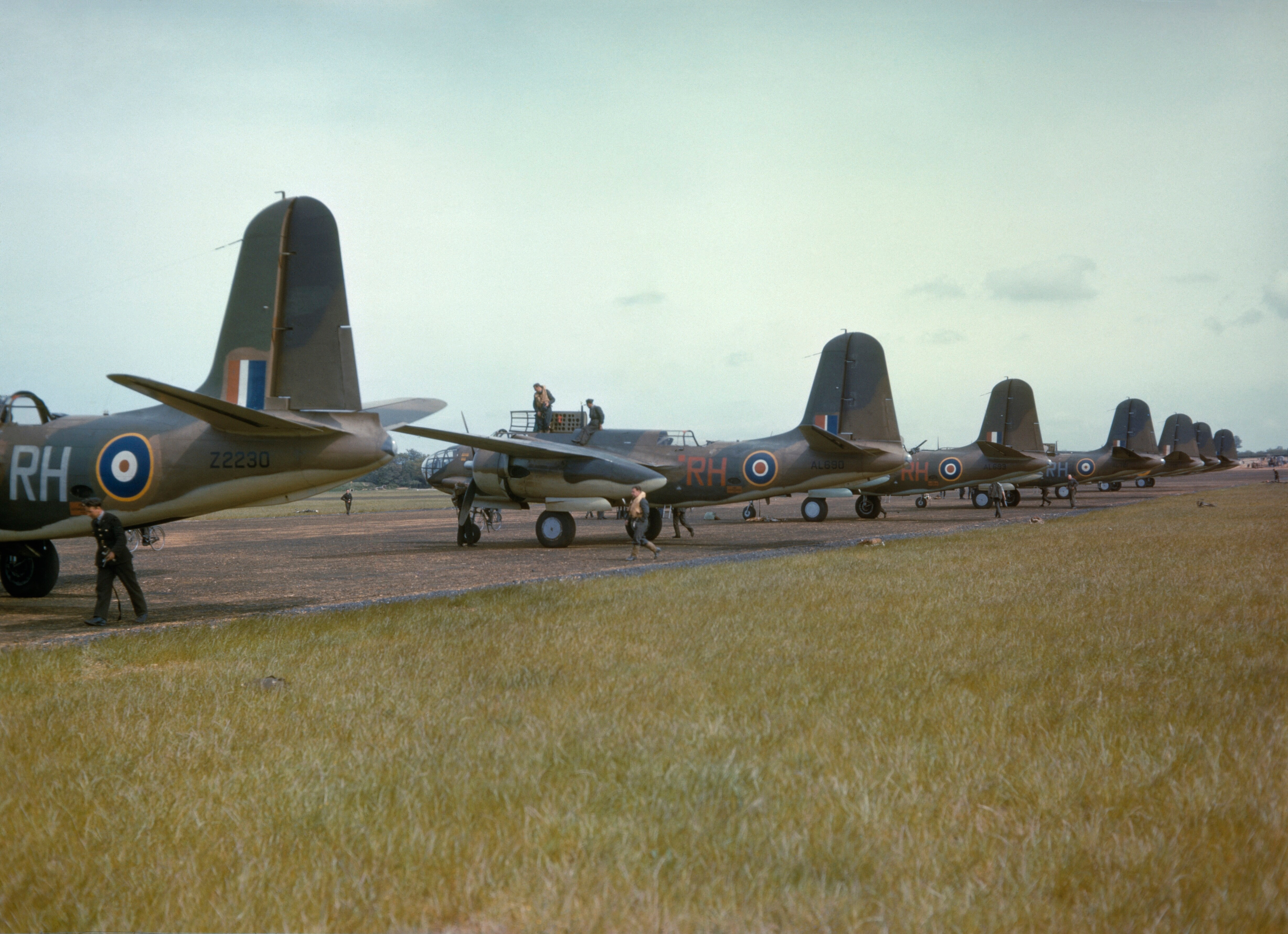
Boston bombers of 88 Squadron at RAF Attlebridge airfield, Norfolk

The order for the attack and initial plan were issued 17 November 1942. Training for the raid began immediately. Wing Commander James Pelly-Fry of 88 Squadron was chosen to lead the attack. He was an experienced pilot who had flown in Africa and been in command of 88 Squadron since the start of the year. Pelly was to fly one of the two low level lead Bostons against the Emmasingel factory, and would be the first man to the target. Circus raids by 2 Group involved from six to 30 bombers, flying at medium altitudes and rendezvousing with their fighter escorts on the way. To strike with the element of surprise, the Eindhoven raid was to be flown at low level from start to finish. Low level flight would avoid radar detection, limit the exposure to anti-aircraft fire and make it more difficult for German fighters to attack.

None of the crews had experience flying a mission in such a large formation, nor so low to the ground. The four types of bombers being used had different ranges and different top speeds. To overwhelm the defences at the target and limit losses it was planned that all aircraft would be over the target, deliver their bombs and be gone in ten minutes. The Venturas were the slowest, the Bostons and Mitchells intermediate and the Mosquitos the fastest. The plan was based on the constraints of the performance of the Venturas, which would be operating close to their maximum range at Eindhoven. The aircraft were to fly in pairs, in echelon formation to starboard. As many as six aircraft could be grouped but no more as formation flying was awkward and made it difficult for any kind of manoeuvre. The big problem was getting a large group of aircraft to arrive at precise times. Formation flying was not new to the group but large formation flying at tree top level was. The attacking force was made up of 48 Venturas from 21 Squadron, 464 (Australian) Squadron and 487 (New Zealand) Squadron, 36 Bostons from 88 Squadron, 107 Squadron and 226 Squadron and ten Mosquitos from 105 and 139 Squadrons.

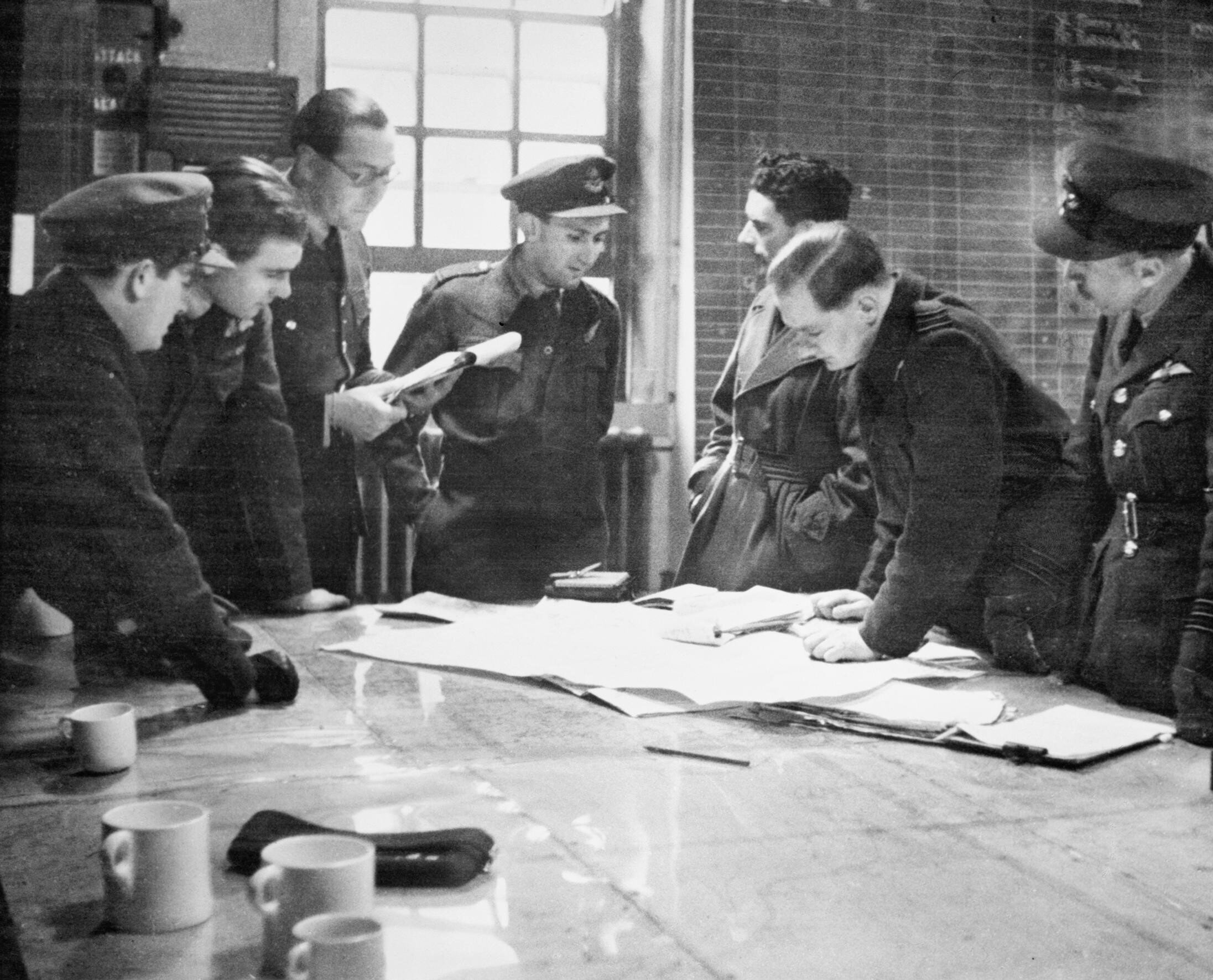
Final briefing, RAF Marham, Norfolk

Though different speed ranges were assigned to the aircraft based on type, all aircraft were to approach, attack and leave the target at their maximum speed. Twelve Bostons, ten Mosquitos and thirty-one Venturas were to strike the main target at the Strijp Group works as twenty-four Bostons and seventeen Venturas attacked the Emmasingel radio tube factory half a mile to the south-east of the main complex. The Boston and Mosquito bombers would carry four 500 lb (230 kg) high explosive bombs, fuzed for 0.025 seconds delay to minimise the tendency for the bombs to slide away from the target before exploding.

Once the aircraft had released their bombs they were to hedge-hop home at full speed. It was decided after the third trial that a Boston from each squadron would fly at low level all the way to the target to draw the attention of German Flak gunners down and away from the larger force that was climbing up to 1,500 ft (460 m) behind them. The low flyers' four 500 lb (230 kg) bombs were to be fused for eleven seconds delay to prevent the aircraft from being caught in the explosions. The Venturas following them would each carry forty 30 lb (14 kg) incendiary bombs and two 250 lb (110 kg) high explosive bombs. The incendiaries were phosphorus, which would stick to whatever they struck and burn. The two 250 lb (110 kg) high explosive bombs on the Venturas were to be fuzed for 30 or 60 minutes' delay, to hamper or injure the firefighters and rescue workers.

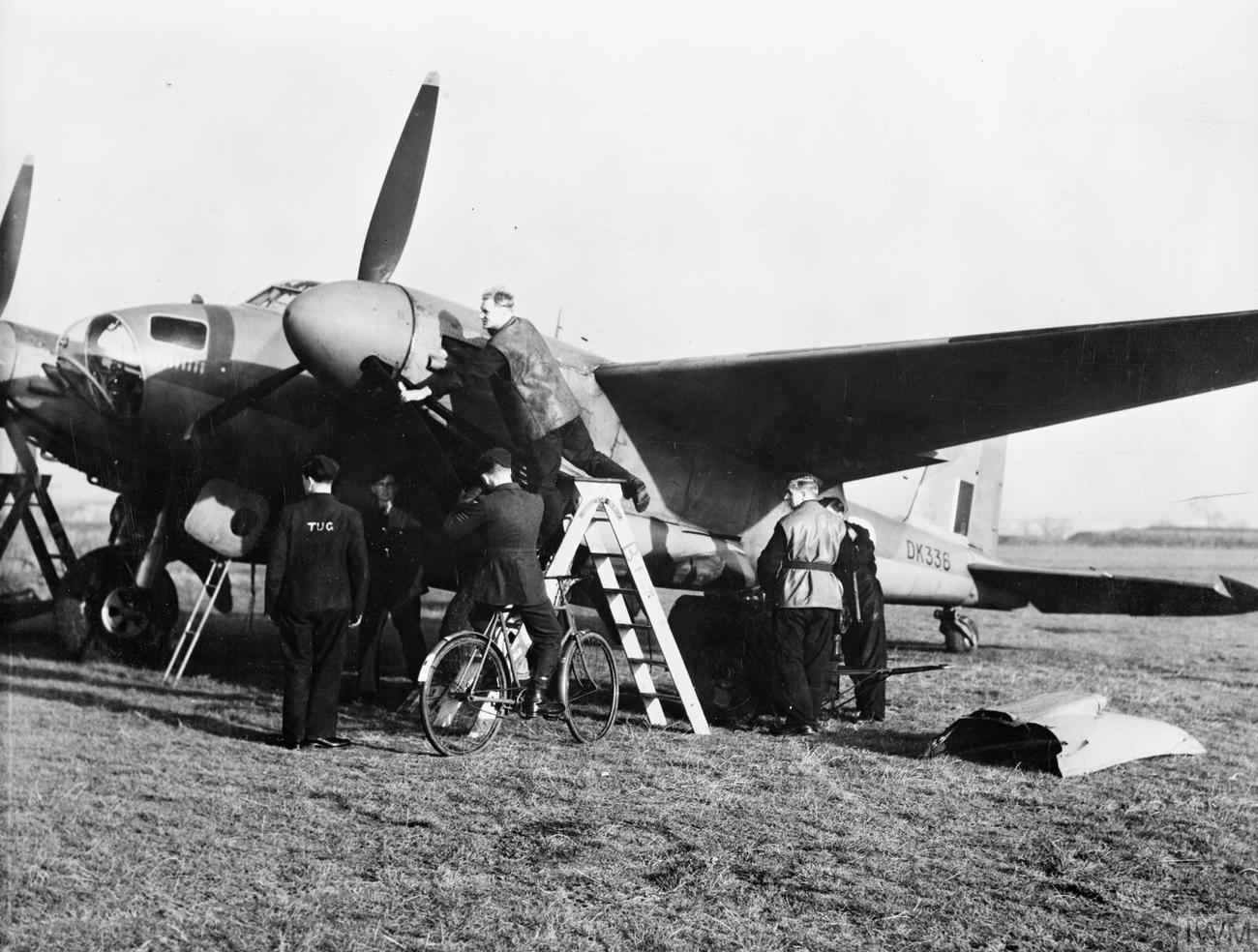
A Mosquito of 105 Squadron is readied for the raid

The Mosquitos would follow the Bostons on the same route, while the Venturas were to fly slightly to the south before turning towards Eindhoven. The three groups were to arrive over the target in close succession. The attack was to be concluded within the span of 10 minutes. The Bostons were to release bombs at zero hour, which was set for 12:30 p.m. They were to be followed by the Mosquitos at zero plus 2 minutes and the Venturas would drop their bombs and incendiaries at zero plus 6 minutes. The Venturas were to turn west after they had bombed; the Bostons were to fly north for 2 mi (3.2 km) and then turn west, so that both groups would arrive over the coast simultaneously. The Mosquitos were generally to fly north initially but were not bound to the other aircraft for the return trip.

Spitfires from No. 12 Group RAF were to escort the bombers home from the coast and as far as 5 mi (8.0 km) inland. Further efforts to protect the bombers involved diversionary raids by the United States Army Air Forces (USAAF), with a formation of Consolidated B-24 Liberator heavy bombers sent to the German airbase at Abbeville, and a larger formation of Boeing B-17 Flying Fortresses sent to Lille, with Spitfire escorts. Eight North American P-51 Mustang fighters of 268 Squadron were to undertake a "Rhubarb" (ground strafing attack) near Alkmaar in North Holland. On the evening of Wednesday, 2 December, the crews were briefed on the raid; no-one was allowed to enter or leave the air bases, no mail was allowed out and the telephones were guarded. The next morning, Thursday 3 December, the RAF Meteorological office declared weather conditions were unsuitable. The stations remained closed as the crews waited for the weather to improve. Finally on Sunday 6 December the weather over Eindhoven was declared favourable.

=== Diversionary raids ===
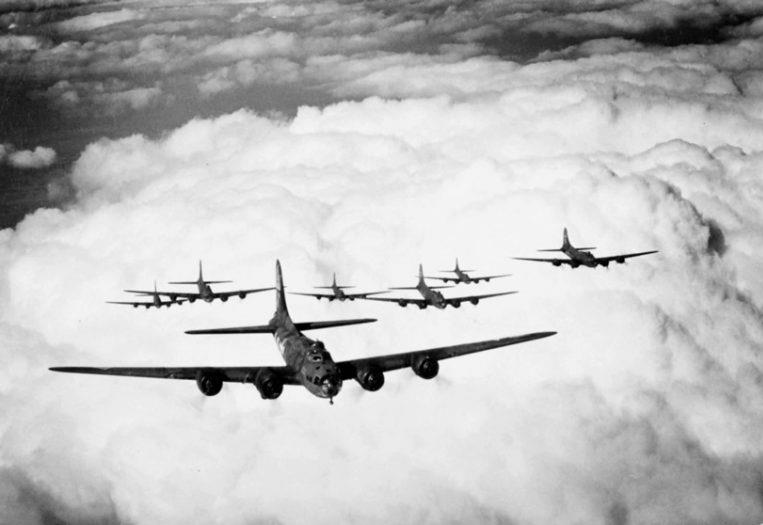
Tail gunner view of the B-17 box

The day started with the Eighth Air Force launching its diversionary raids; nineteen B-24s from the 44th Bomb Group were sent out at 9:30 a.m. to attack the German airfield at Abbeville. An hour later the primary effort of 66 B-17s from the 91st, 303rd and 305th Bomb Groups were aloft to bomb the Atelier d'Hellemmes rail yard at Lille. During these operations the Eighth Air Force used replacement crews to fly two mock runs over the channel to divert attention from the main effort, the diversions looking like routine operations.

The US bomber groups were detected and followed by German air controllers. Luftwaffe fighter aircraft from JG 1, JG 26 and JG 2 were sent up to intercept them. En route to Abbeville the B-24s of the 44th were recalled but one flight of six aircraft did not receive the message and continued. This flight was intercepted over the target and lost one of their B-24s but they reached the airfield, dropping their bombs at 11:24 a.m. Thirty-five minutes later the main force of B-17s rendezvoused with their Spitfire escorts, arrived over Lille and bombed the rail works at 12:10 p.m. Thirty-seven of the US bombers were considered effective on target. As they were exiting the target area they were attacked by 20 to 30 enemy aircraft, losing one of their number.

== Raid ==
=== Approach ===
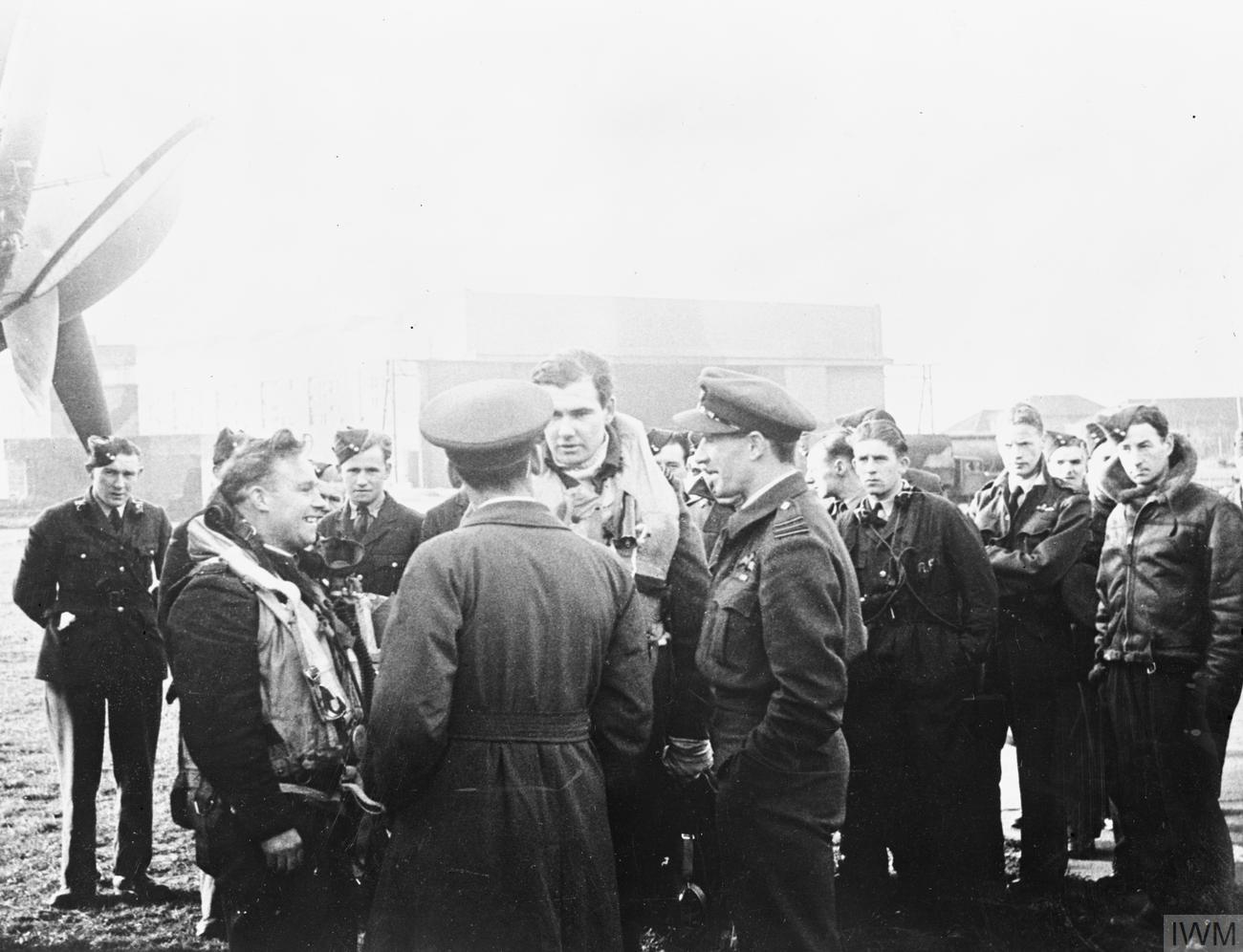
Wing Commander Edwards of 105 Squadron under the foggy, hazy skies above RAF Marham shortly before the start of the mission

From 11:15 to 11:30 a.m. the eight squadrons of 2 Group took off and kept below 100 ft (30 m) in radio silence, formated by type and headed for the coast. The Southwold Lighthouse served as a guide for the Bostons and Mosquitos, while the Venturas were plotted slightly to the south, passing over Orfordness Lighthouse, undetected by German radar operators. The raiders flew so low over the North Sea that they made a propeller wash. In 45 minutes the Dutch coast appeared as a thin smudge on the horizon. There were no large features to guide their approach; landfall was intended to be at a small town called Colijnsplaat, at the mouth of the Oosterschelde estuary, on the north coast of the island Beveland. The leading Bostons arrived over the inlet, German flak batteries on the coast were taken by surprise and were only able to put up scattered fire as the Bostons passed by.

The Bostons followed their track up the Oosterschelde estuary, hugging the north coast for 30 mi (48 km) to reach their main landfall at Bergen op Zoom. In the estuary, the first hazard arose in the form of sea birds, which were startled by the sound of the aircraft approaching and rose into the air. The risk was known but the number and size of the birds was greater than anticipated. As the aircraft flew through them, some birds shattered wind screens, penetrated cockpits and injured aircrew, others bent fuel pipes and caused wing damage. In one aircraft two gulls smashed through the nose Perspex, striking the navigator in the legs. The wind caught his maps and sucked them out of the broken windscreen; he navigated from memory for the rest of the sortie.

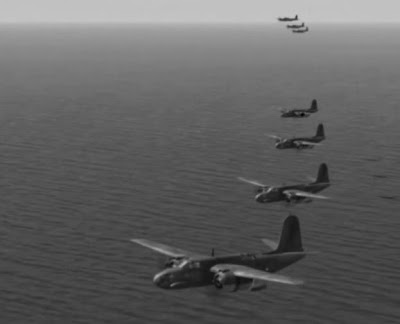
Bostons in pairs, in echelon starboard, as they cross a calm North Sea on their outward flight

Three minutes behind were the Venturas; alerted by the Bostons, the German gunners were ready. The Venturas had missed their landfall and arrived a mile to the south over the island of Walcheren where German flak defences were more numerous. There was a tremendous splash as a Ventura was hit and crashed into the sea. A few moments later a second was hit on the starboard side of the cockpit. The pilot was injured but was able to put the aircraft down in a ploughed field. A few fighters from II Gruppe/JG1 were returning from the air battle over Lille when they came across the low flying bombers. Rudolph Rauhaus brought his Focke-Wulf 190 in behind a Ventura as it cleared Walcheren and damaged the aircraft, which crash landed on the Zealand peninsula Reimerswaal; three of the six crew survived and were taken prisoner.

As the aircraft approached the top of the estuary they came within sight of the Woensdrecht airfield, the home of II Gruppe, just to the south of Bergen op Zoom. As they flew past it German Focke-Wulfs could be seen taking off from the airfield, banking and turning towards them. A Mosquito pilot said,

They looked so normal, just like Spitfires taking off in England, that it was hard to realise they were coming up to kill you.

— Charles Patterson

Hugging the ground, the aircraft continued south–east into Belgium, sideslipping and weaving as they went. They kept low, rising up slightly to help clear hedges and houses. Pilots and navigators, pointed out trees, chimneys, high-tension cables and other obstructions to avoid.

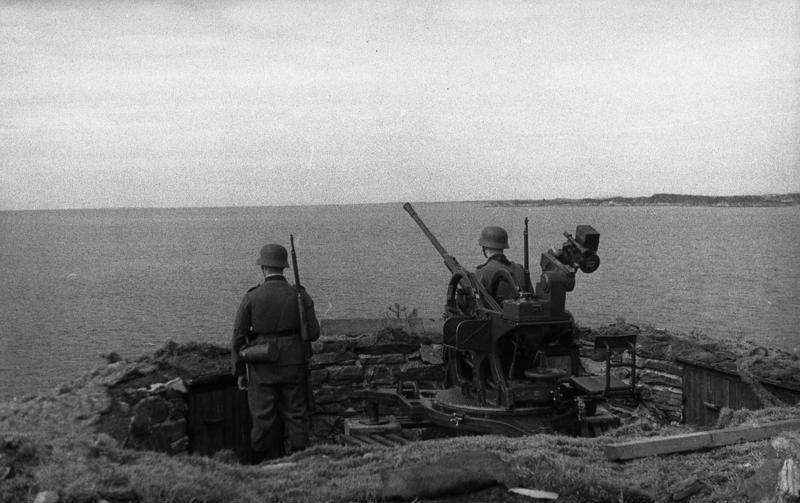
A German 20 mm Flak gun emplacement

Following the Bostons, the pilots in the Mosquitos observed enemy aircraft approaching from the airfield. Squadron Leader D. Parry and Flight Lieutenant W. Blessing turned toward them. They closed in a moment and soon were being fired upon. Banking and pushing throttles full on, they accelerated, the Focke-Wulf 190 having a similar top speed to the Mosquito. (Note: The first Mosquitos built were rated with a level flight top speed of 392 mph (631 km/h) against the Spitfire Mk V at 372 mph (599 km/h). The Focke-Wulf 190A had a top speed of 396 mph (637 km/h) but each aircraft varied slightly based on how it was tuned.) Parry went flat out, keeping an eye on his pursuers; eluding his attackers, he was able to continue. Blessing was chased for ten minutes, got away but was too late to resume the mission and returned to base with his bombs.

Pelly led the Bostons and Mosquitos following behind toward Turnhout. Flying at high speed and very low altitude was a navigational nightmare. If his line was wrong and he failed to lead them in to the target, coming around again would be a disaster. Reaching Turnhout he turned north-east to fly the 24 mi (39 km) that would bring his squadron to Eindhoven. On the maps Pelly had noticed a rail line running in to Eindhoven from the south. To his great relief, arising in the distance in front of him he saw a puff of white smoke from a railway engine. Coming up he stayed to the left of the embankment of the rail line. As they reached Eindhoven two sets of very large factory buildings loomed. The 24 Bostons from 88 Squadron and 226 Squadron headed for Emmasingel. Turning to the left, the 12 Bostons from 107 Squadron followed Squadron Leader R. J. McLachlan for the big buildings at Strijp.

=== Attack ===
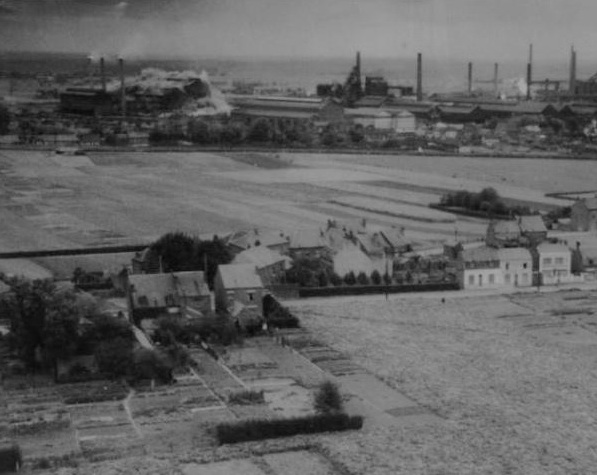
On-board camera footage of the approach to the Philips plant

The Mosquito force was due to arrive on target at Zero plus 2. They had to be careful to check their speed to avoid overtaking the Bostons. Behind these came the Venturas, who had taken a slightly longer route to Oostmalle to stretch the time before turning toward Eindhoven. They would stay low and deliver their incendiaries on to the factory rooftops. Pelly-Fry and his wingman led 88 Squadron and 226 Squadron in to the Emmasingel works. Their aircraft were engaged by German anti-aircraft guns and machine-guns on the roofs of the buildings and returned fire. Behind them, the Mosquitos climbed to 1,500 ft (460 m) ready for their shallow dive attack. Pelly-Fry came up on the factory and delivered his bomb load but as he cleared overhead his aircraft was hit in the starboard engine and wing. The wing dropped and he found he was flying the aircraft at a 90 degree angle to the ground. Struggling to regain control, he was slowly able to get his wings level. Pelly-Fry said that the aircraft felt very sluggish and he had a hard time bringing it to port. While the time delay fuses ran down, he left the area with full power on, heading north.

It had been a quiet Sunday afternoon in Eindhoven; no air raid sirens had been sounded. The day before had been St Nicholas Eve and families were sitting down to lunch. The first sign that something was amiss was the steady humming of synchronised engines growing steadily louder, a telltale sign of approaching British aircraft. (Note: To negate British sound location equipment the Germans did not synchronise the engines on their twin- and multi-engined aircraft and they would give off a throbbing sound.) People began to come out to see what was happening. In a moment the loud firing of German anti-aircraft guns shattered the peace, soon answered by the machine guns of the approaching British bombers. Those near the factory were soon scrambling back inside their homes, as bombs began exploding behind them. The Bostons of 88 Squadron and 226 Squadron had climbed to 1,500 ft (460 m). Levelling off, they released their bombs in a shallow dive, dropping their four 500 lb (230 kg) bombs between 12:30 p.m. and 12:33 p.m. The factory shook and smoke began to fill the air.

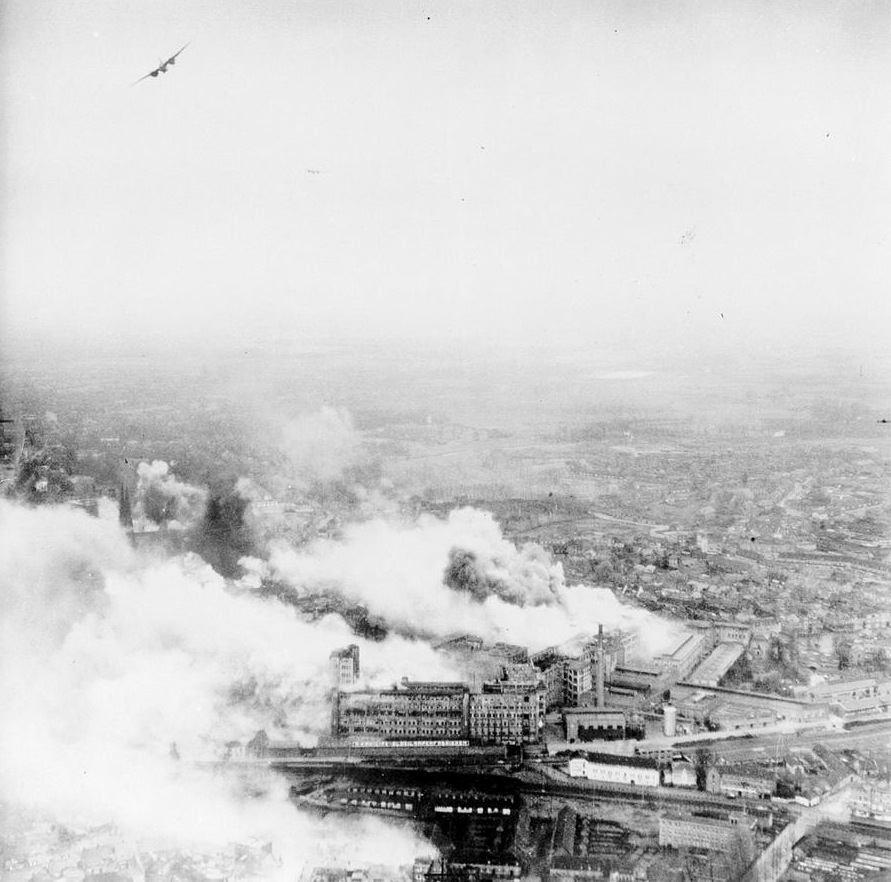
RAF Mosquito over the Philips works during the Eindhoven raid

A similar attack was carried out by the Bostons of 107 Squadron against the Strijp works. Jarred by the explosions, the Strijp tower clock stopped at 12:32 p.m. and remained stuck for the rest of the war. With bombs gone, the Bostons descended and followed Pelly-Fry, who was heading north. This had been the plan but only for a short time, then they were to turn west for the coast but as Pelly-Fry continued north, the Bostons followed him. Behind the Bostons came the Mosquitos trying not to overtake. Due to arrive on target just after the Bostons, they also climbed to 1,500 ft (460 m). As they were climbing to bombing height they were attacked by three Focke-Wulfs. The Mosquitos were unarmed and one turned away, chased by the German fighters. Going flat out he was able to avoid damage, while pulling the German fighters away from the slower Bostons. The remaining Mosquitos dropped their bombs on the Strijp works, descended to very low altitude and looked for a way out.

Following both groups were the Venturas, carrying their incendiaries in for a low level attack at Zero plus 6. As they brought up the rear, there was no problem finding the direction to the target, as smoke billowed from it into the air. The smoke obscured the buildings and made it difficult to avoid obstructions. As the Venturas began releasing their incendiaries the fires increased and visibility got worse. One of the Venturas attacking the Strijp complex was hit, flew into a cloud of smoke and a building, where it exploded. Fire, smoke and aircraft filled the air. Another Ventura was seen to be hit, catch fire and fly straight through a Dutch house, erupting in an explosion as it came out the other side. Another was seen by a following aircraft to deliver its incendiaries, only to have some of the phosphorus splatter onto its tail and set it on fire; the aircraft dived into the earth and exploded. The Venturas were bombing but were suffering higher losses. A pilot, Stephen Roche, said "The flak and machine-gun fire were terrific, and once we bombed it was every man to himself". German gunners on rooftops were seen firing their guns as the buildings they were standing on burned underneath them or exploded; several other Venturas were lost in the attack.

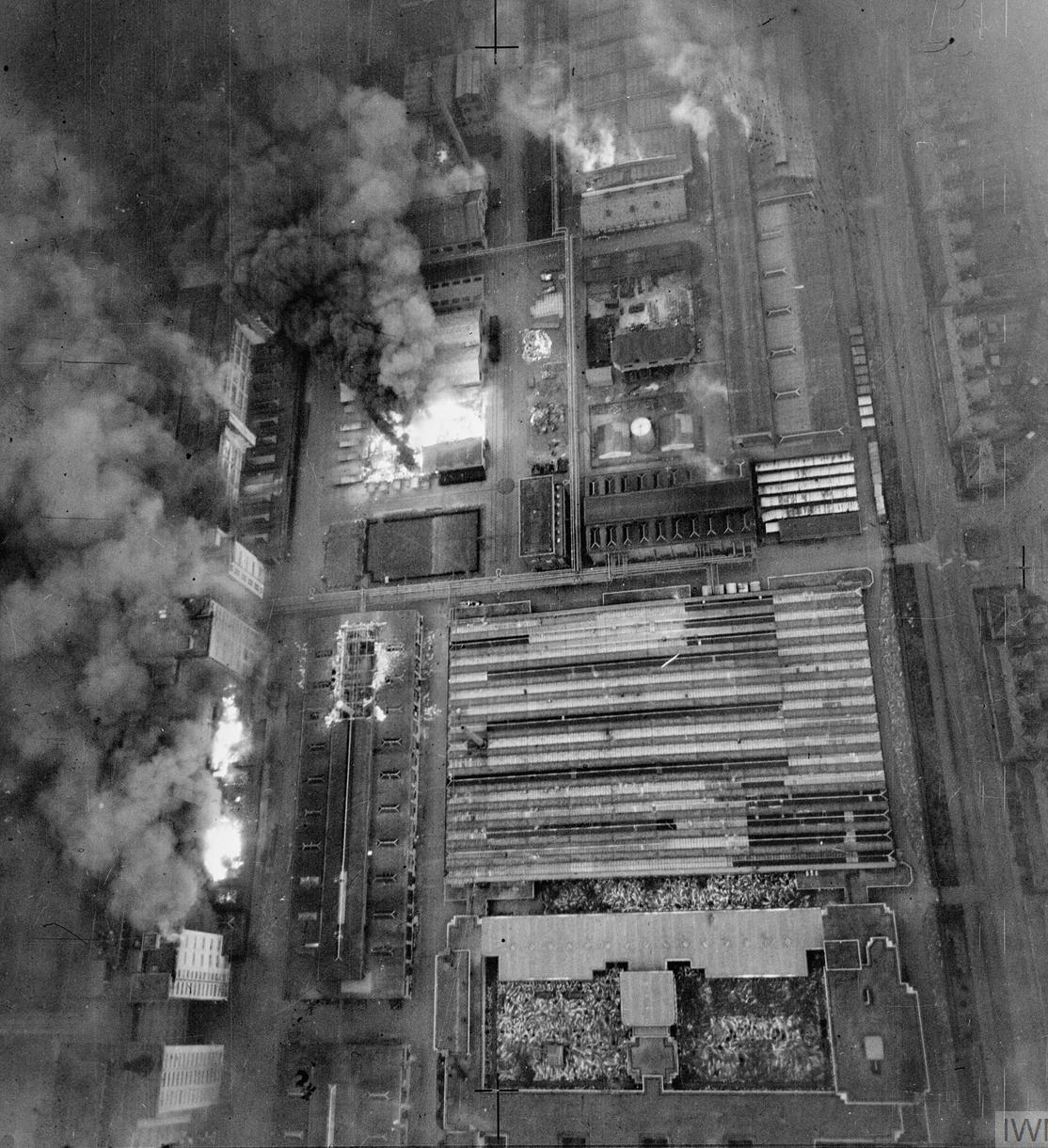
Photo-reconnaissance image of the Philips Strijp works 30 minutes after the raid

Having released their bombs, the aircraft hedge-hopped for home. Pelly-Fry's aircraft, hit during the bomb run, had its starboard aileron shot off, making turns to port very difficult. While he struggled for control his course took him north. The trailing Bostons followed him right past the turning point and found themselves continuing north, toward Rotterdam. The north route to the coast was longer, the port was well defended and their Spitfire escorts would be waiting for them over Colijnsplaat. Eventually some Bostons banked away and headed west as the rest followed north to Rotterdam. Soon they were dodging the tall cranes of the shipping yards but they managed to get through. The Mosquitoes followed the Bostons in for their bomb run on the Strijp works. Patterson recalled,

In the distance I could see masses of Bostons whizzing about across the trees at low level to port. I came straight down to ground level. Now the Mosquitoes all split up and we all had to come home separately.

The Mosquito crews were free to choose their own route home to the north.

=== Withdrawal ===
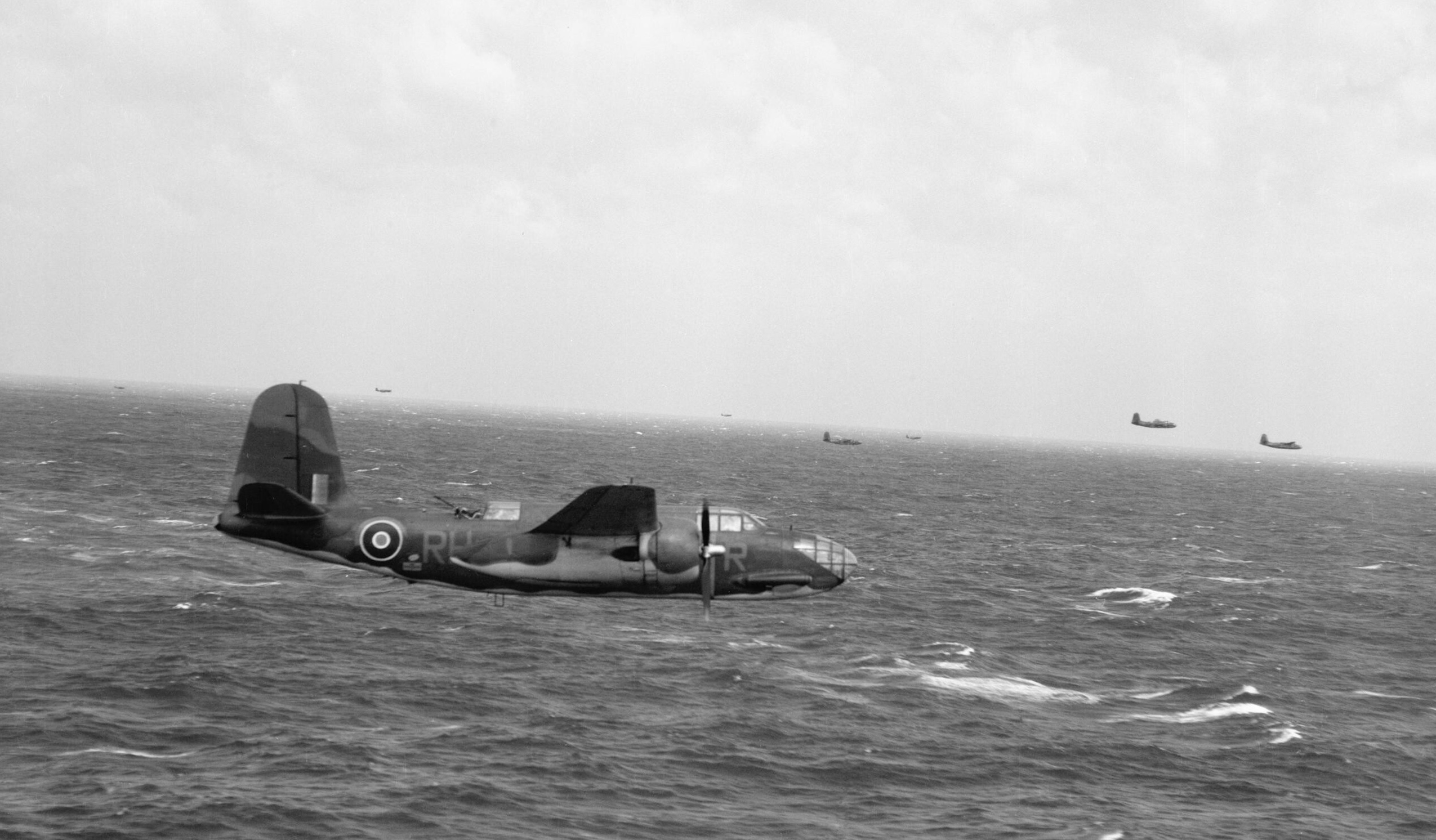
Bostons on their return trip over the North Sea

Much faster and with no guns it made no sense to tie the Mosquitos to the Bostons and Venturas. After flying north, some turned to the west; coming up behind the Bostons, the Mosquitos could see them weaving and sliding. The Bostons were flying low and as fast as possible, with the hazards now increased by German fighters. A Boston pilot, Jack Peppiatt, wrote,

After a few minutes settling down it all went up with a bang as Fw 190s appeared. Without doubt the next 20 minutes or so were full of action and not a little confusion. Some 10 or 20 aircraft were screaming along, full throttle in a loose mass. No one wanted to be at the back where the Focke-Wulfs were coming in to attack and wheeling away for another go.

The Bostons were joined by some Mosquitos, who looked to gain protection from their defensive firepower but soon thought the better of it and sped past them. The attacks at the rear of the formation were awkward at such low altitude; coming from above the Focke-Wulf pilots had to turn away early to the side, as there was no room below to dive through the group. Except for the bomb run, pilots did not fly straight and level over occupied territory and the rear-gunner kept watch. The gunner would fire his .303 machine-guns but accuracy was difficult with the aeroplane jerking about and mattered less than evasion. In the running fight to the coast, pilots slid and weaved, keeping an ear out for the cry of "Jink!" Flak picked up again as they reached the coast and followed them out over the sea. A Boston was hit and crashed; as they pulled away larger guns joined in, creating huge splashes with their shells to bring down an aeroplane with the spray. This was frightening to the crews, many of whom thought the splashes were the result of aircraft crashing but all managed to get clear.

The Mosquitos scattered along several return routes. Patterson decided it might be safer to avoid the planned route the Bostons were taking, as German fighters might have gathered over the west coast to intercept them. He headed north for the Zuider Zee, looking to turn west past the gap at Den Helder. Fellow Mosquito pilot John O'Grady followed him; O'Grady was a Canadian who had trained under Patterson at an operational training unit. The two aircraft travelled north over the causeway low and fast, 20 ft (6.1 m) over the water. As they approached the choke point where the southern tip of Texel approached Den Helder, German gunners sent up a barrage of flak. Patterson survived but O'Grady's aircraft was hit; a short way over the North Sea Patterson's navigator called out "He's gone into the sea!" Patterson circled back but all he could find was disturbed water. German fighters had gathered off the coast along the Bostons' route. Wing Commander Peter Dutton, the CO of 107 Squadron, was shot down 3.7 mi (6 km) out from Katwijk aan Zee. Two more bombers from 107 Squadron were lost to fighter attacks over the water and another from 226 Squadron was lost off Scheveningen.

== Aftermath ==
=== Analysis ===
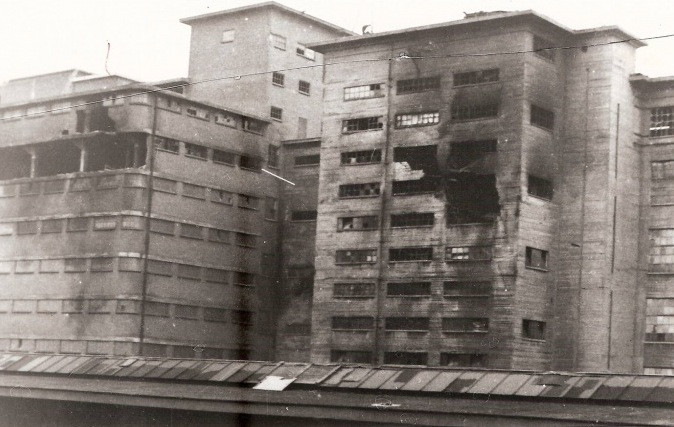
Damage to the Philips Strijp works. The large hole was caused by the crash of a 487 Squadron Ventura

The Eindhoven raid took the German defenders by surprise. Low-level navigation was excellent and around 83 per cent of the aircraft involved delivered 60 long tons (61 t) bombs with a high degree of accuracy and concentration. Reconnaissance photographs obtained later showed severe damage to the factory. The losses suffered by 2 Group meant that the operation would be unique. Operation Oyster is remembered as 2 Group's most famous and successful operation of the war. Both factory complexes suffered significant damage and production was stopped.

For Frits Philips, chairman of Philips, the destruction came as a shock. Dutch nationalists like Philips had to walk a tightrope. He had to give the appearance of collaborating with his German occupiers, while providing a minimal effort in support of the German war economy. Philips had been obstructing the plant's production for some time but the overstated reports he had been sending to Germany had apparently found their way to the Air Ministry. Facing the reality of the destruction the following morning, Philips' first concern was that his skilled workers would be removed to Germany. He began work to clear the debris, providing his German overseers with optimistic projections of the plant's return to production but ensured that the repairs proceeded in a deliberate manner. In May the following year the Gestapo put Philips in a concentration camp for five months because he had failed to end a strike. The RAF sent ten Mosquitos to revisit the Philips plants on 30 March 1943 to slow the recovery and it took six months to restore production.

=== Subsequent events ===
The returning aircraft were met at their airfields by the press, who swarmed about the crews and took pictures of the damaged aeroplanes. That night parties were held and a concert given with household names from the world of radio entertainment. The next day the raid was celebrated in the press; the crews were all placed on a three-day leave. Eindhoven was liberated on 18 September 1944 and an intelligence appreciation of the Philips plants noted the passive resistance of the Philips leadership and the distrust of their German overseers. It asserted the most effective sabotage agency in action at Philips had in fact been the German system of allocation and control.

=== Casualties ===
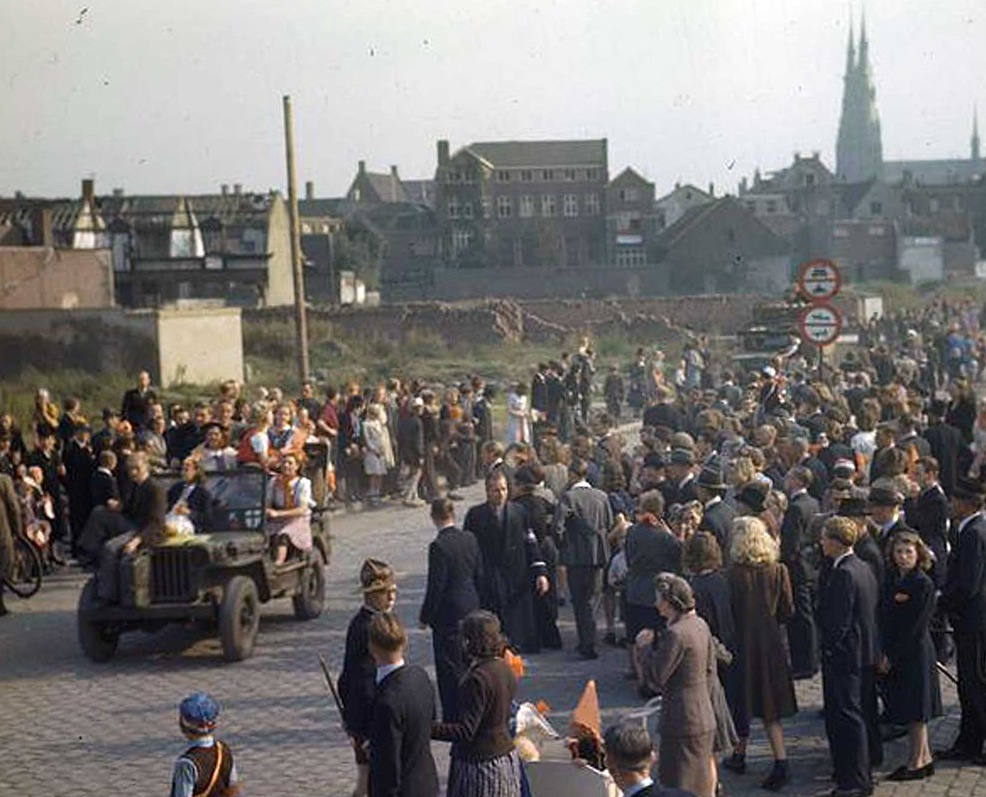
The Dutch in Eindhoven celebrate their liberation, 18 September 1944

Sixty-two aircrew were lost; nine Venturas, four Bostons and a Mosquito were shot down, including one in the sea and another crashed in England, a loss rate of 16 per cent. Thirty-seven Venturas, thirteen Bostons and three Mosquitoes were damaged, seven seriously, 57 per cent of the force. The Venturas had a 20 per cent loss rate and three crash-landings in England, losses that could not be sustained. Few losses and little damage were caused by German fighters, the bombers proving difficult targets at such low level; one Mosquito was intercepted by a Fw 190 as it approached Eindhoven and abandoned its bombing run after evading the Fw 190, whose pilot gave up the chase near Flushing. At least 31 aircraft had bird strikes, some hit trees and several Venturas hit houses when bombing through smoke; light flak damaged some aircraft and possibly shot down others. The group had to stand down for ten days while aircraft were repaired and losses replaced. A B-17 and a B-24 were lost in the two diversionary raids, along with one of the escorting Spitfires; a Fw 190 was shot down. Civilians suffered 150 casualties and seven German soldiers became casualties.

== Bibliography ==
- Ashworth, Chris (1995). RAF Bomber Command 1936–1968. Somerset: Haynes. ISBN 978-1-85260-308-3.
- Bowman, Martin (2014). Voices in Flight: Daylight Bombing Operations 1939–1942. Barnsley: Pen & Sword Aviation. ISBN 978-1-78383-177-7.
- Bowman, Martin (2005). The Reich Intruders: RAF Light Bomber Raids in World War II. Barnsley: Pen & Sword Aviation. ISBN 978-1-84415-333-6.
- Bowyer, Chaz (2001). Bomber Barons. Barnsley: Leo Cooper. ISBN 978-0-85052-802-2.
- Middlebrook, Martin (1974) [1973]. The Nuremberg Raid: The Worst Night of the War March 30–31 1944. New York: William Morrow & Co. ISBN 0-688-02873-X.
- Terraine, J. (1998) [1985]. The Right of the Line: The Royal Air Force in the European War 1939–1945 (facs. repr. Wordsworth ed.). London: Hodder and Stoughton. ISBN 978-1-85326-683-6.
- Rijken, Kees; et al. (2014). Operation Oyster: The Daring Low Level Attack on the Philips Radio Works (ebook ed.). Barnsley: Pen & Sword. ISBN 978-1-4738-3907-6.
- Webster, Charles; Frankland, Noble (2006) [1961]. The Strategic Air Offensive Against Germany 1939–1945: Preparation parts 1, 2 and 3. History of the Second World War United Kingdom Military Series. Vol. I (facs. repr. Naval & Military Press, Uckfield ed.). London: HMSO. ISBN 978-1-84574-347-5.
