= James Pelly-Fry =

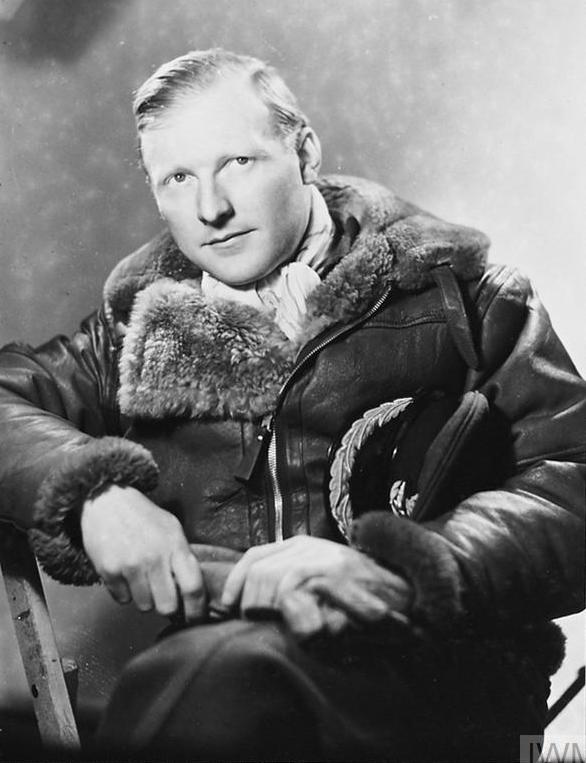
- Group Captain Pelly-Fry in 1945
- Born: 22 November 1911
- Died: 6 December 1994 (aged 83)
- Military career
- Allegiance: United Kingdom
- Branch: Royal Air Force
- Service years: 1935–1958
- Rank: Group Captain
- Nickname: Pelly
- Conflicts: Second World War
- Awards: Distinguished Service Order

James Ernest Pelly-Fry, DSO (22 November 1911 – 6 December 1994) was an officer in the Royal Air Force. His war career alternated between flying in operational squadrons and serving as an aide for senior commanders. His many appointments gave him the opportunity to view the events of the European War from a command level as well as an operational level. Following the war he spent a brief amount of time as an airline pilot before returning to the RAF. He represented the RAF at a series of NATO conferences, where he formed valuable relationships with a number of national leaders. He had a lifelong interest in aeromodeling, and was a worldwide figure in that hobby. He is best known for leading the low-level daylight raid against the Philips plant in Eindhoven, known as Operation Oyster.

== Early life ==
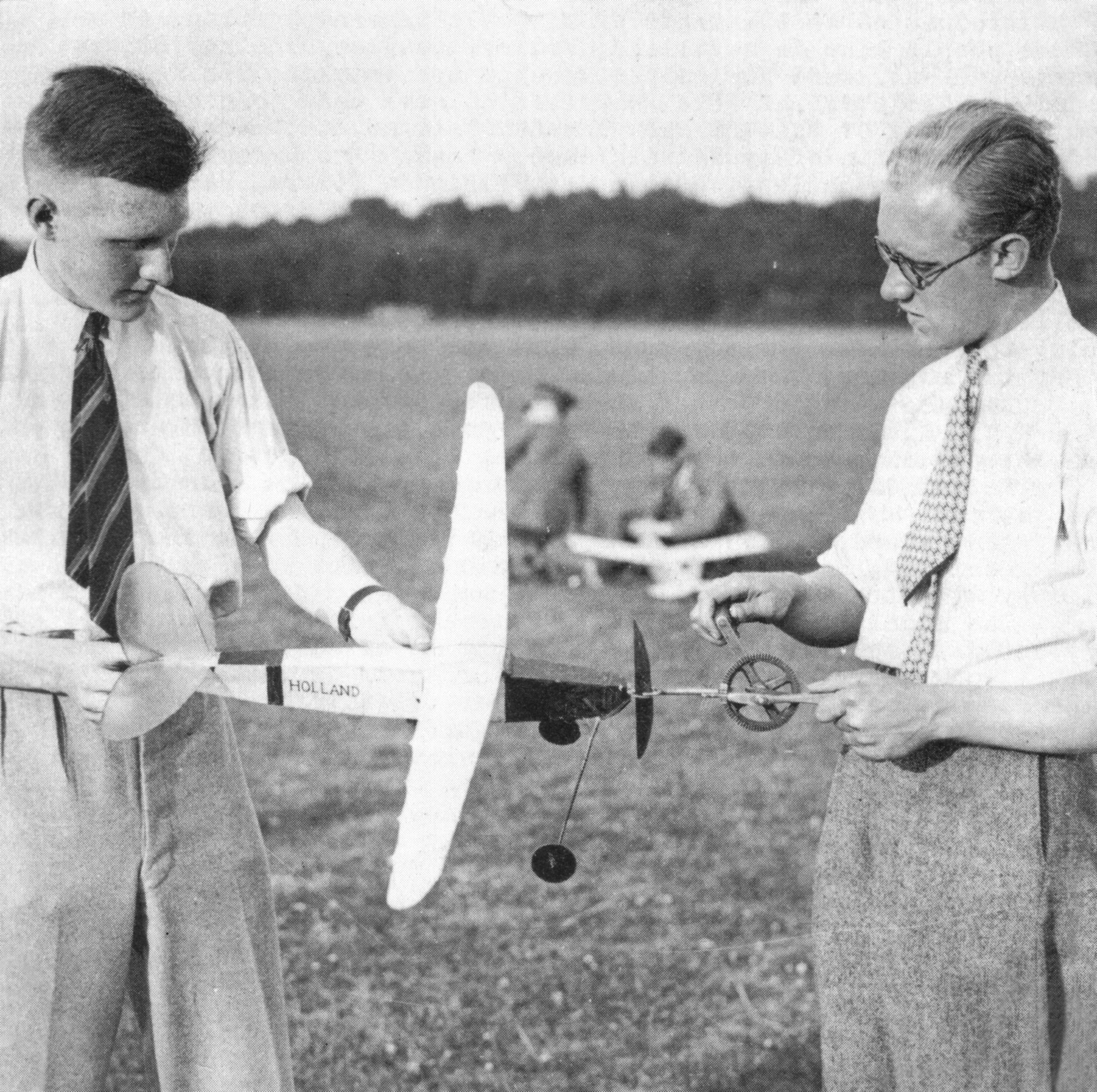
17 yo James Pelly-Fry (left) holds model airplane "Wapati II" while it is being wound by Dutch designer Juste van Hattum, 1929

James Ernest Pelly-Fry was born on 22 November 1911. His father was a tea merchant. The family lived in Colombo in Sri Lanka, then called Ceylon. When Pelly-Fry was 5 years old the family returned to England so that the children could attend school, while his father stayed in Ceylon. The family moved to the home of his grandmother and aunt in Epping, in the county of Essex. Pelly-Fry was educated at Douai School in Berkshire. His father died nine years later, at the age of 50. Pelly-Fry left school soon thereafter and went to work in the accounts department of the P&O Shipping Company. Two years later he was apprenticed to the tea company Joseph Tetley and Son.

The home in Epping happened to be located close to the RAF airfield at North Weald, which provided young Pelly-Fry with many opportunities to observe aircraft in operation. From a very early age Pelly-Fry had a fascination with flight. He became involved in aeromodeling, and at the age of 17 became a member of the British Wakefield team. There were no model kit manufacturers at the time, and the aircraft were all hand built from scratch materials. He gained a reputation as a designer and flyer, and flew his own designs on Wimbledon Common. He helped formulate the Wakefield Cup rules, and was a member of the British team from 1928 to 1932. During this time he worked through the week at the tea company, and spent his evenings either designing and building aircraft or writing about doing so in model aircraft magazines. The week-ends were often spent at Wakefield Commons. In 1933 Pelly-Fry accepted the invitation of American Gordon Light to fly his entry in the cup. Competing against six British entries, he finished tied for second.

Pelly-Fry was very interested in becoming a pilot himself, but it was an expensive undertaking. Friends he had made in aeromodeling were able to encourage and direct him, and he applied for a position in the Royal Air Force. Though he did not initially succeed in getting into the RAF proper, in 1933 he was accepted for the Reserve of Air Force Officers. He spent a year at the de Havilland School of Flying in Hatfield, Hertfordshire, from June 1933 to October 1934. The curriculum covered flying, and the design, manufacture, and operation of aircraft. The instructors were engineers from the de Havilland aircraft company. The following year he signed on with an air charter firm at Heston Aerodrome to fly Fleet Street newspapers to Paris.

In 1935 the Royal Air Force offered him a short-service commission. He was posted to the 216 transport squadron in Egypt, flying the Vickers Valentia. He spent the next three years flying in Africa, gaining valuable experience and flying hours. In October 1938 Pelly-Fry was selected as personal assistant to AOC Palestine and Trans-Jordan, Arthur Harris. Harris dubbed him "Pelly" and the nickname stuck.

== Second World War ==
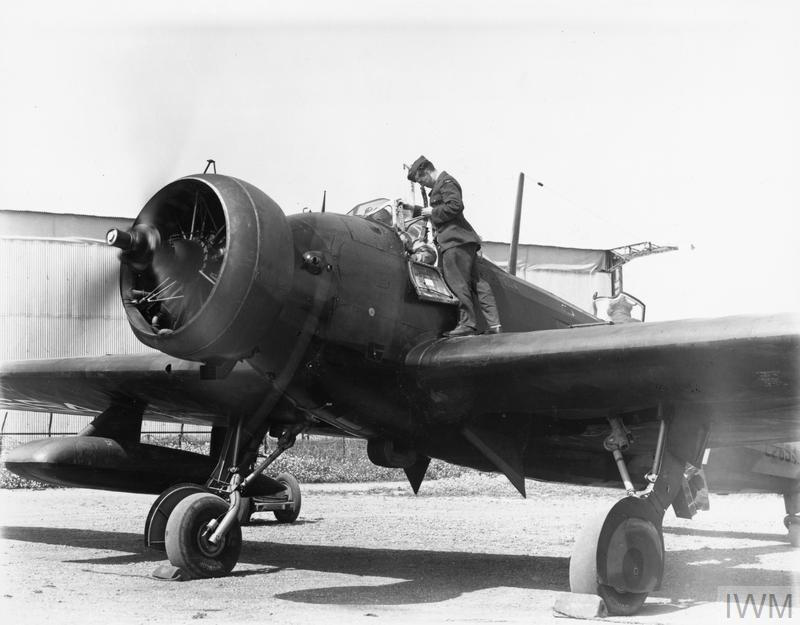
A Vickers Wellesley is prepared for a mission

At the start of the Second World War Pelly-Fry was Flight Commander of 'A Flight' with the 223 Squadron, flying Vickers Wellesleys out of Nairobi in Kenya. When Italy entered the war in June 1940 his squadron was based at RAF Summit, an airfield along the rail line about 60 miles south west of Port Sudan. Their first combat mission on 11 June 1940 was a raid against Italian aircraft at the Gura airfield. Pelly-Fry led his flight of Wellesley bombers on a number of missions against Italian targets in Sudan and Italian East Africa during the East African Campaign. The flight was nicknamed "Pelly-Fry's Hell Divers". In August 1940, the squadron moved to Perim Island, near Aden to support operations in Italian Somaliland. Pelly-Fry was made commanding officer of 47 Squadron, also in the Wellesley wing and continued leading missions until he was transferred in January 1941.

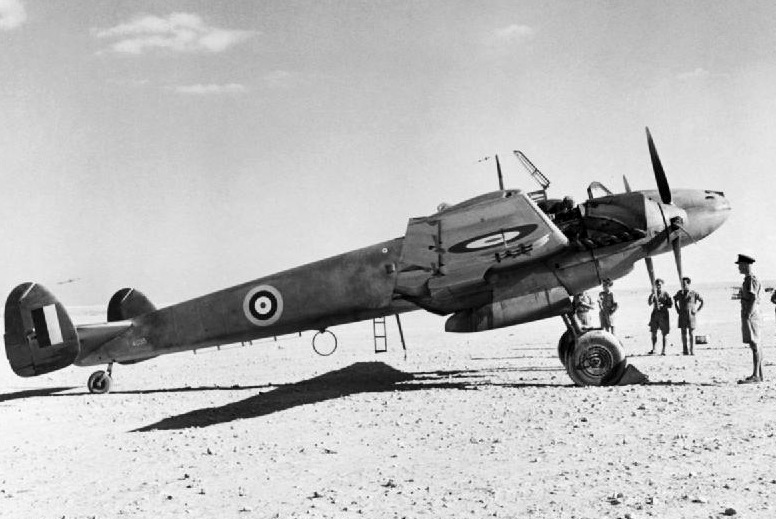
Pelly-Fry's recovered Bf 110, Belle of Berlin, in Egypt

He was next posted as Joint Senior RAF Intelligence Officer Western Desert and, in the spring of 1941, was involved in the relief of RAF Habbaniya, under siege from the rebel force of the Iraqi potentate Raschid Ali. While there one of the pilots made a chance discovery of a Messerschmitt Bf 110 fighter that had made a wheels-up forced landing in the Iraqi desert some 30 miles south-east of their airbase, and abandoned there. Pelly-Fry was immediately interested in recovering the long range fighter, to gain knowledge of the craft and with thoughts that he might be able to make personal use of the airplane. He flew out in a Tiger Moth to inspect the wreck. Just before opening the cockpit canopy he discovered the plane had been rigged with a booby-trap. He was able to disarm the device and inspect the aircraft, and soon set about recovering it. Pelly-Fry found the senior officers predictably unimaginative when they asked "What on earth do you want to recover a crashed German aeroplane for?" He was able to get a recovery team together, which drove out to the wreck with hoisting gear, elevated the aircraft, dropped down its landing gear and towed it back to the airbase. The ground crew at Habbaniya was able to repair the plane, but the work was not completed until after Pelly-Fry had been transferred off station. The aircraft was flown to Egypt for a time, and then sent to South Africa, where it had to make a second wheels up landing, ending the plane's useful life.

In February 1941 he was transferred to the RAF's Headquarter Middle East in Cairo where he served for a year. Pelly-Fry served as Arthur Tedder's intelligence officer. Pelly had the idea of mounting two large maps on the walls of his office to keep track of the air activity of both RAF and that of the enemy. His staff updated changes frequently, and one could observe events as one would a tennis match. Tedder said he would come sit in Pelly's office, look up at the maps and consider: "Am I doing the right thing?", "What is the enemy up to?" and "What should I do next?" In March Pelly-Fry was mentioned in despatches.

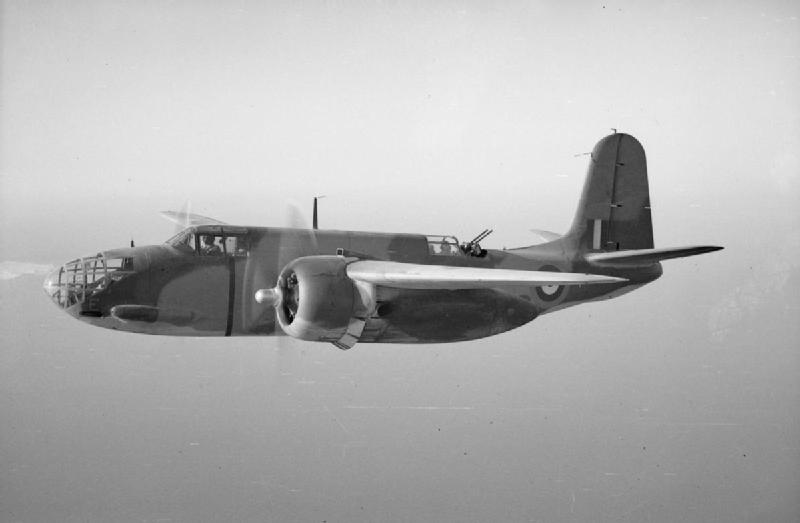
The Douglas Boston

In January 1942 Pelly-Fry was transferred back to Britain. As a pilot of 31 years age and with a good deal of seniority, it was difficult for him to find duty in an operational squadron. He applied for night fighters, scoring 31 of 32 on the night vision entry test, but was not accepted due to his seniority. Finally he was assigned commanding officer of 88 Squadron, a light bomber formation undertaking daylight raids over occupied Europe as part of 2 Group. 2 Group was making daylight raids across the channel, and had the highest loss rate of Bomber Command groups. Pelly-Fry formed a crew and soon worked up to the lead position on operations. He led a series of circus missions over northern France, bombing targets while under heavy fighter escort, including the bombing of the Saint-Malo docks on 31 July 1942. 88 Squadron crews were billeted at Blickling Hall, a stately home north of Aylsham in Norfolk, where CO Pelly-Fry was soon nicknamed "Baron Fry of Blickling." At the time of his arrival, 88 Squadron had just been equipped with the Douglas Boston medium bomber. This aircraft became a great favorite of Pelly-Fry. "One thing I was sure of, the Boston was just about the nicest, toughest, safest, fastest and most pleasing operational aeroplane that ever happened."

The circus operations they were flying were intended to prompt a response from the Luftwaffe in an effort to engage them and destroy them in combat. The bombing forces being covered were small, perhaps 12 aircraft, which were intended to have a high and low cover, three Spitfire squadrons in each. Rendezvous with the covering squadrons in the challenging weather over the English coast was difficult, but it was essential for the survival of the bombers. There was a certain tension that developed between the fighter squadrons and the bomber squadrons, who questioned if they were just asked along as bait. To address the situation Fighter Command requested a squadron commander from 2 Group be sent down to the Fighter Leaders School at RAF Charmy Down near Bath. Pelly-Fry was ordered to fly down to the course and give a talk to the fighter pilots training there on the workings of the bomber squadrons. Speaking with the pilots after his talk it soon became clear to all that what was needed was to simulate air operations, using a bomber force, a fighter escort and a strong force of intercepting mock-up German fighters. The idea was enthusiastically received by the fighter pilots, and the commands of Fighter and Bomber Headquarters gave the green light. A group of aggressor Spitfires were set apart by having their spinners and rudder fins painted red. Pelly's first foray was with a vic of three Bostons. The Fighter Leader School Tactics instructors followed within the formation or shadowed the formation from a distance to observe the exercise. The first go was a success. In subsequent visits Pelly would come down with his whole squadron. These training missions helped the groups function together better in the air, and the bomber pilots picked up a number of tricks from the Spitfire pilots on how to avoid gunfire during fighter attacks.

The other major problem with working with the fighter escorts was linking up when the weather over England was often poor. This was made all the worse because for the daylight raids the bomber groups formed up and crossed the channel under the German radar, which meant they were down under 200 feet. The ability to find other aircraft flying at such a low height was very limited. Pelly solved this by advising Fighter Command that his Bostons would make the planned rendezvous on the correct heading and at the precise time, give or take 15 seconds. This required Pelly's navigator, Jock Cairns, to be on the mark every time, and he never missed a trick. Pelly soon developed a close working relationship with his fighter escorts. At the conclusion of a mission as they approached the English coast, he would often hear the click of the VHF followed by the Wing Commander offering him a farewell "Hi-de-hi!", followed by the rest of the Spitfire pilots, calling back in unison "Pelly-Fry!"

On 16 August Pelly-Fry's squadron was secretly moved down from Attlebridge in Norfolk to RAF Ford in southern England. The move came three days before they were to be used to support a cross channel reconnaissance in force. Ford normally supported a night fighter squadron, which was moved for the mission. Speaking to the accommodations, Pelly remarked: "The airfield commander, Wing Commander Gerald Constable Maxwell, a kinsman of the Duke of Norfolk, was kindness itself and most efficiently made every provision for our stay. Upon arriving at the wartime officers' mess, or rather the sleeping quarters element, I was curious to know just why all the house bells were ringing incessantly. Upon tackling one of my young men about it, he said 'Have a look at the notice, sir.' The house was an erstwhile girls boarding school. And the notice read: 'If you need a Mistress, ring the bell.'"

Starting at daybreak, 19 August 1942, Pelly led his squadron in a series of sorties across the channel to Dieppe to suppress German batteries overlooking the beaches. The air battles engaged in to support the Dieppe raid were some of the most intense of the war. Though the RAF lost 91 aircraft, the Royal Air Force performed well and succeeded in their mission.

=== Operation Oyster ===
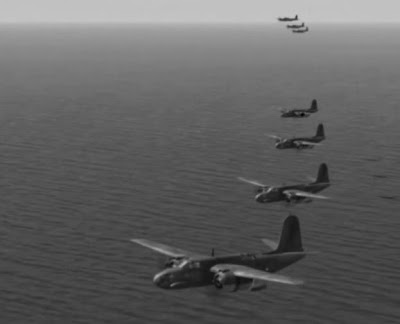
Bostons over the North Sea approaching Eindhoven

Toward the end of November Pelly-Fry was called in to his commander's office. "There's to be a big show soon, Pelly" said Group Captain Denis Barnett. "It will need a lot of practice. It's to be a low level affair. The big problem will be getting a large group of aircraft to arrive at very precise times, and we shall be using different types of aircraft" This was Pelly's introduction to Operation Oyster, a major mission he would lead in daylight over the Netherlands.

The mission was against the Philips works in Eindhoven, a large electronics manufacturing interest and research center. The Philips factories were thought to supply Germany with a third of the radio tubes used in its military radio communication equipment. The target was beyond the range of escort fighters. A high-level night attack by Bomber command had been ruled out, as it would result in a great many civilian casualties. As almost all of 2 Group was committed to the raid, three different types of bombers were involved. On 6 December 1942 Pelly-Fry led the eight squadrons tasked with destroying the Philips factories at Eindhoven.

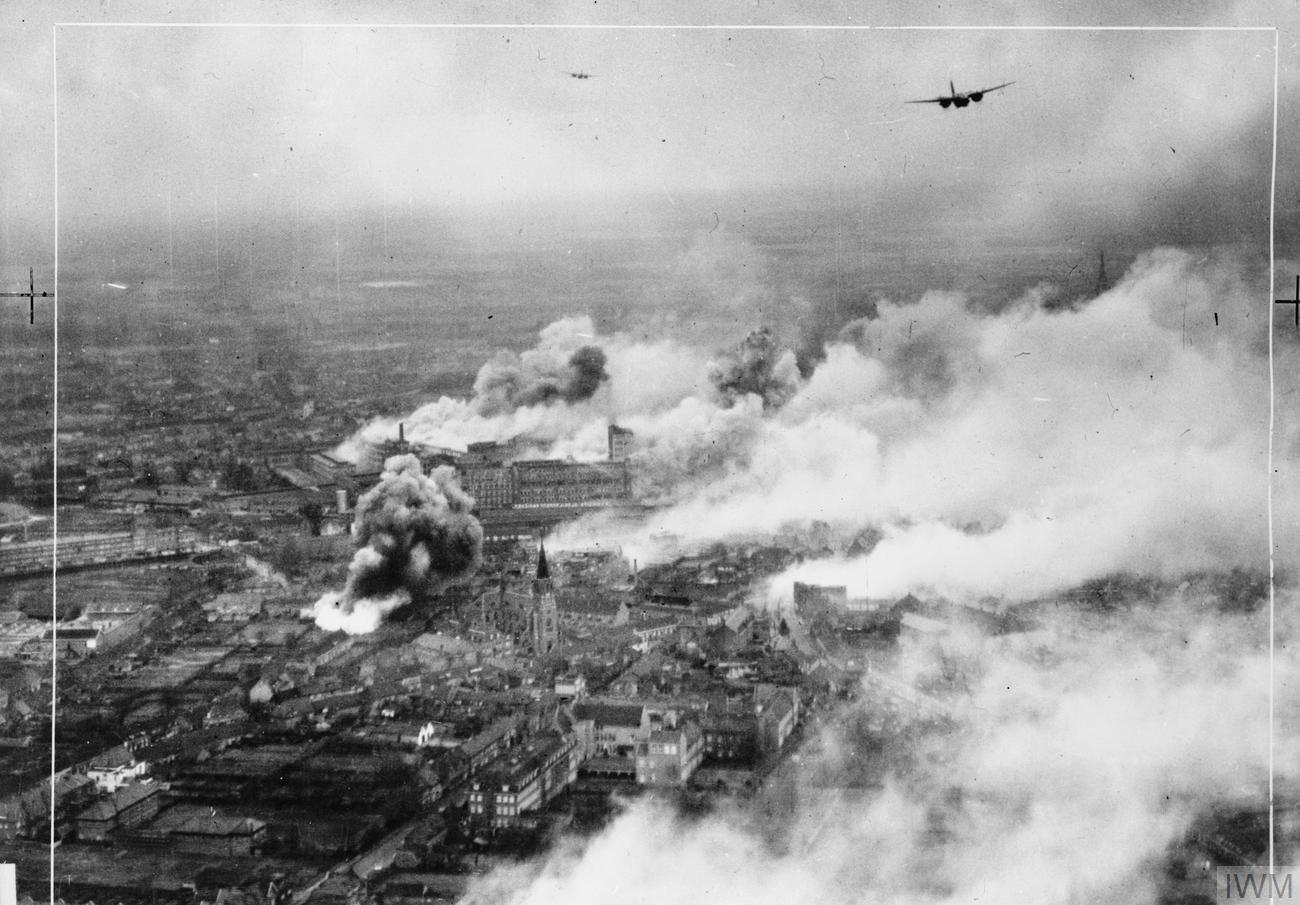
The Philips plant is hit during the Eindhoven raid

As mission leader his aircraft was first to the target. The low level attack left no room for error. As he made his approach to the factory the two lead Bostons approaching at low level attracted a fair amount of flak. He dropped his four 500 pound time delayed bombs on the Emmasingel vacuum tube works. He was so low during the attack that German anti-aircraft gunners on the roof were actually firing down at him. He had just cleared the target when his aircraft suffered flak damage to his starboard wing and engine. The starboard wing dropped and he was flying at 90 degrees vertical from the ground, but he was able to pull it back. The damage to his starboard wing made it a struggle to get his aircraft to turn to port and home. He was forced to continue north, eventually flying out through the dockside cranes of Rotterdam. Chased at the coast by a pair of Focke-Wulf 190s, he managed to evade their fire and made it back to England. Crossing over the channel, his port engine went in and out of trim. He struggled to keep the aircraft aloft. Reaching England, he asked if his crew would want to take to the chutes, but they all elected to stay with the aircraft. Pelly did a wheels up landing on a field, and everyone was able to get out alive. Inspecting the aircraft afterwards, he could see that the entire starboard aileron had been shot away.

Nine Venturas, four Bostons and one Mosquito had been lost in the operation, but the Phillips factory had been effectively demolished. It was 6 months before it resumed production. Pelly-Fry was awarded the DSO for his role in Operation Oyster, the most famous and successful operation conducted by 2 Group.

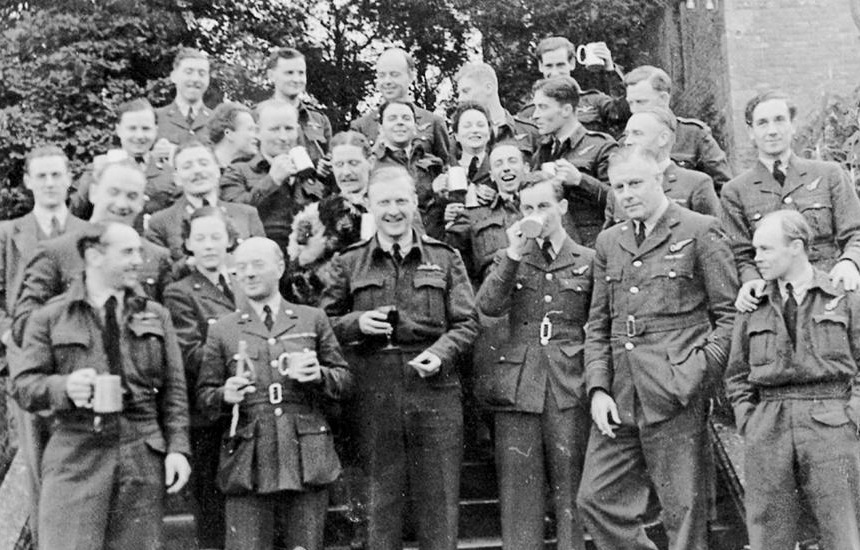
Wing Commander James Pelly-Fry (center) and fellow officers of 88 Squadron celebrate surviving the Eindhoven raid

When Pelly-Fry visited the works while serving with the RAF after the war, he was apologetic to the Phillips directors for the destruction he had caused their plant. They were gracious hosts, and made him very welcome. "I am sorry for knocking your plant down", offered Pelly. "No hard feelings", Philips chairman Frans Otten replied, adding with a smile, "As you can see, we have a much better one now."

Near the completion of his tour in October 1943 Pelly-Fry was, to his astonishment, appointed Air Equerry to Britain’s King George VI. The position was as an aide to the King, and did not require Pelly to pilot the King's aircraft. He moved into Buckingham Palace and accompanied the royal family in their travels. Several months later he discreetly arranged to return to active service.

Now with the rank of group captain, Pelly-Fry was assigned as station commander of the airfield at RAF Holme-on-Spalding Moor in Yorkshire. The field supported Halifax bombers in the night bombing campaign over Germany. Prior to arriving he had to be checked out in the four engine bomber, and cleared to fly it day or night. Responsible for 3,500 station service personnel, the well being of the aircrews was his primary concern. The inevitable failure of aircraft to return and resultant loss of life of the aircrews he found deeply troubling. Though he was involved in the day to day running of the facility, when 76 Squadron was sent out on night operations every 3rd or 4th night he insisted on being present in the tower, both when the Halifaxes launched into the night, and again 4 hours later when they were due back. He remained station commander of this airfield until the end of the war.

== Life after the war ==
In October 1945 Pelly-Fry was posted to Australia as Station Commander of RAF Camden in New South Wales. The station was part of the Transport Command, and was the main base for No. 300 Group RAF, which flew transport aircraft in support of the British Pacific Fleet. He held this post until February 1946. He then returned to civilian life and worked as a charter pilot in Kenya.

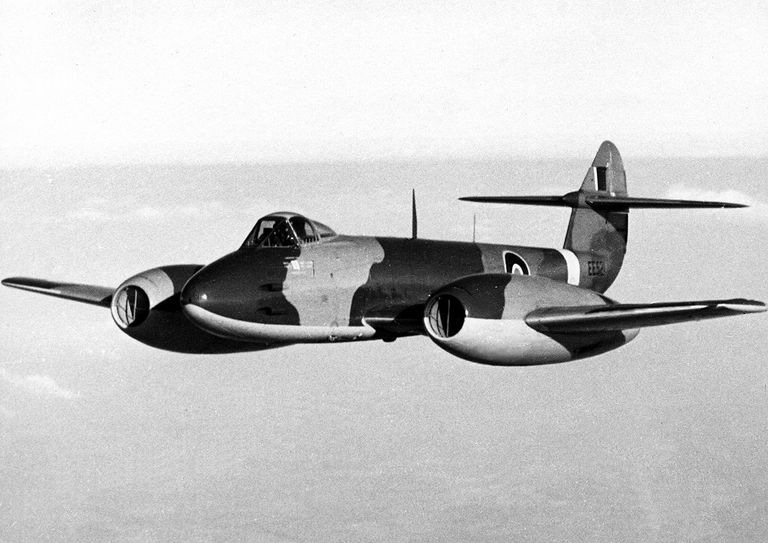
The Gloster Meteor

In 1947 he returned to the RAF, receiving a permanent commission as Squadron Leader 17 November 1947. He was posted to RAF Syerston as Wing Commander Administration. He was appointed to the RAF Personnel Selection Board, and staff appointments in NATO followed. Pelly-Fry attended the NATO Defence College in Paris from June to December, 1952. In January 1953 he was posted to the Plans, Policy & Operations Division of SHAPE, based in Paris. He remained there until January 1955. In April he was assigned Air Officer Commanding 12 TS, and oversaw their conversion to Meteor jets at RAF Weston Zoyland in Somerset. He was then promoted to group captain and appointed air attaché in Teheran. He held this post from July 1955 until he retired in September 1958.

Pelly-Fry retired from the RAF in 1958. He had been noted for establishing an easy rapport with leading figures in NATO. His relationship with the Shah of Iran’s regime had proved of value in generating substantial export business for Britain's aviation industry.

Upon retirement Pelly-Fry was immediately engaged by the Commonwealth Office as their Civil Air Adviser, British High Commissioners in Australia and New Zealand. He remained in this post, working out of Melbourne, until late 1962. He then joined the aircraft manufacturer Handley Page, where he worked from 1963 through 1966. After leaving Handley Page he went into the food business. He trained in Harrods’ Food Hall, and then opened a delicatessen of his own in Sussex. He called his deli Epicure of Chichester. He ran the business with his wife for a number of years before selling it and retiring to Somerset, where they lived near Naval Air Station HMS Heron.

Pelly-Fry's proximity to a working airfield soon had him thinking of flight again, and he resumed his hobby of 50 years earlier, model aeroplanes. He first designed and built a 10 foot wingspan sailplane. As opposed to his creations from the late 1920s, his new model aircraft was radio-controlled and had working flaps and leading edge slots. Built by Pelly-Fry, it was flown by expert modelers comfortable with radio-control, and flew beautifully. Next Pelly fitted a small engine and demonstrated the craft's ability to stay aloft at extremely slow speeds. He then designed and constructed a miniature air speed indicator and fit it into the nose of the airplane. The unit confirmed that with flaps and leading edge slots deployed the aircraft could stay aloft at the airspeed of a brisk walk. With this technical success in hand, Pelly-Fry set about creating model aircraft that depicted those he had flown, starting with the plane he flew with 88 Squadron, a 1/10 scale Boston bomber with markings 111A RH-A and painted in the livery of the day. Next up he created a 1/10 scale version of Wellesley AO-A, flown by Pelly-Fry in 223 Squadron. His last completed project was of a 1/8 scale model of the de Havilland DH104 Devon he had flown as Air attaché in Tehran. In addition to building and flying model aircraft, he wrote articles for Model Aviation Magazine and Model Engineer. He served as a council member for the Society of Model Aeronautical Engineers. His insights were included in the first Model Aeroplane Manual.

In the early 1990s Pelly-Fry wrote his autobiography, Heavenly Days: Recollections of a Contented Airman. It was published in 1994. The book recounts his life long fascination with flight, and the great good luck he had to be able to become a pilot and RAF officer. It recounts life in the RAF in the early 1930s, his many experiences flying all throughout Africa, the start of the Second World War, his time flying and commanding operational squadrons, and his impressions of many of the war's leaders whom he came to know during his time on staff headquarters. Notable figures Pelly writes of in his book include Marshals of the RAF Lords Charles Portal and Arthur Tedder, Air Chief Marshal Sir Basil Embry, Air Marshal Sir George Beamish, Air Vice Marshal Raymond Collishaw, Squadron Leader M T St John "Pat" Pattle, Field Marshal Lord Bernard Montgomery, General Sir William Platt, irregular warfare practitioner Orde Wingate, Major General David Lloyd Owen of the Long Range Desert Group and aviation editor C. G. Grey.

== Personal life ==
In 1949 at the age of 38 he married Irene Dunsford. The couple had a son.

Pelly-Fry died 6 December 1994 while at a gathering for pilots and crews who participated in Operation Oyster.

A representation of the many model aircraft Pelly-Fry built, including scale versions of the Boston, Wellesley and Devon airplanes, can be seen at the Goosedale Model Museum.

== Awards ==
- Mentioned in Despatches 17 March 1941
- Distinguished Service Order 8 January 1943 (Note: Citation reads: On 6 December 1942 a force of bombers was detailed to make an attack in daylight on the Phillips factory at Eindhoven. The operation, which was executed faultlessly, demanded a high degree of skill and accurate timing. Bombs were dropped at varying heights down to rooftop level. Many hits were obtained, some in the center of the target area. Two gun posts were silenced. Intense and heavy opposition was encountered, and both on the outward and return flights attacks were made by enemy fighters. The great success achieved reflects greatest credit on the following personnel, who participated as leaders and members of aircraft crews.)

== Bibliography (partial) ==
- Heavenly Days: Recollections of a Contented Airman Bristol: Crécy Books, (1994).
- Wellsleys Over The Sudan Aeroplane Monthly, March 1984 pp. 137–138
- Wellsleys Over The Sudan, Part 2 Aeroplane Monthly, April 1984 Second part of an article by Pelly-Fry about his time as a flight Leader in 223 Squadron fighting the Italians in Italian East Africa.
- The Model Engineer & Practical Electrician: A Journal of Small Power Engineering Vol. 63, No. 1542, Thursday, 27 November 1930
- Pelly-Fry also wrote many articles on model aircraft building, which are not listed here.
