= Charles Findlay =

Scottish military officer (1891–1971)

- Born: 22 June 1891; Glasgow, Scotland
- Died: 1971 (aged 79–80); Kilcreggan, Scotland
- Military career
- Allegiance: United Kingdom
- Branch: British Army; Royal Air Force
- Service years: 1915–1946
- Rank: Group Captain
- Service number: 04001 (RAF)
- Units: 52nd (Lowland Division); Highland Light Infantry; No. 52 Training Squadron RFC; No. 88 Squadron RAF
- Commands: No. 9 Squadron RAF; RAF Wyton
- Conflicts: World War I World War II
- Awards: Distinguished Flying Cross; Air Force Cross

Group Captain Charles Findlay DFC AFC (1891–1971) was a Scottish military officer. In World War I, he was a flying ace credited with fourteen aerial victories. He made the Royal Air Force his career and served throughout and beyond World War II.

== Early life and service ==
Charles Findlay was a married arts student in Glasgow when World War I began. He enlisted as a private in the Mounted Field Ambulance Section of the 52nd (Lowland) Division in March 1915, but then was commissioned a second lieutenant in the Highland Light Infantry's 6th Battalion, effective 8 September 1915. He was posted to the Highlanders at their base at Kantara, Egypt, and fought in their Sinai Campaign in December 1916. He then transferred to the Royal Flying Corps.

== Aerial service in World War I ==
Findlay went for pilot training with No. 52 Squadron RFC. As soon as he qualified as a pilot in May 1917, he was retained with the squadron as an instructor. Two months later, he was forwarded to the staff of the Gunnery School in Ayrshire. In early 1918, in response to his request, Findlay was posted to a fighter squadron assignment with No. 88 Squadron RAF, then forming at RAF Kenley. The squadron took its new Bristol F.2 Fighters to France in April 1918. Findlay scored his first victory on 30 July 1918, driving a Pfalz D.III down out of control. Then, on 6 August, he scored the first of thirteen consecutive wins over Fokker D.VIIs, the Germans' newest fighter. On 11 August, he scored a quadruple victory, burning two Fokkers and driving two down. He ended his tally on 30 October 1918, with a double victory. In summary, he destroyed eleven enemy airplanes, setting six of them on fire; he also drove down three more out of control, all without his plane taking a single bullet hole.

Aerial victory was not Findlay's only contribution to his country's war effort; he also helped raid enemy aerodromes. He also experimented with wireless telegraphy between airplanes.

== Post World War I ==
Findlay emerged from the war a captain, and decided to remain in the RAF. He was promoted from Flying Officer to Flight Lieutenant on 30 June 1923. On 30 June 1931, he was promoted from Flight Lieutenant to Squadron Leader. He went on to command of 9 Squadron, and of RAF Hyton. His promotion from Squadron Leader to Wing Commander took place 1 April 1937. He was awarded the Air Force Cross on 9 June 1938. Promotion to Group Captain came on 1 September 1940. He retired in 1941 as a Group Captain, but returned to be re-employed for another five years. Between the wars Findlay was one of the men responsible for maintaining the nucleus of the RAF which was to perform heroically in the Battle of Britain. Although physically he did not take part in that famous chapter of World War Two, the personnel who did used much of his knowledge and expertise. In late December 1942, Findlay arrived in Rhodesia to take up the post of Commanding Officer at Moffat Airbase.

This appointment lasted for two years into the post war period, whereupon he later returned to his native Scotland, settling in Kilcreggan, a village in Argyle and Bute. He died there in 1971.

== Honours and awards ==
Text of citation for Distinguished Flying Cross (DFC):

Lieut. (A./.Capt.) Charles Findlay. (FRANCE)
On 29 October this officer led his flight with the greatest dash and determination against a hostile formation of about fifty machines. Reinforced by six more machines—making a total of twelve in all—he fought his patrol against the enemy's overwhelming numbers for upwards of half-on-hour, but the enemy being continuously reinforced he was eventually forced to withdraw. Cleverly extricating his formation he retired across the lines, our only casualties being one pilot and one observer wounded. The enemy lost heavily, five machines being shot down in flames (one by Capt. Findlay), four destroyed and six driven down out of control.
