= Gerald Frank Anderson =

South African flying ace (born 1898)

- Born: 24 February 1898; Newcastle, Colony of Natal
- Died: 23 August 1983 (aged 85); Hove, England
- Military career
- Allegiance: England
- Rank: Lieutenant
- Unit: No. 88 Squadron RAF
- Awards: Member of the British Empire; Distinguished Flying Cross

Lieutenant Gerald Frank Anderson MBE, DFC, was a Colony of Natal born flying ace. During World War I, he was accredited with eight aerial victories.

In later life, he went into business, then served in Her Majesty's Foreign Service. He was also famed as a composer of chess problems.

== Early life ==
Gerald Frank Anderson was born in Newcastle, Colony of Natal, on 24 February 1898.

== World War I ==
Anderson served in 88 Squadron during World War I as the pilot of a two-seater combat airplane, a Bristol F.2 Fighter. He scored three aerial victories personally, with the front machine gun, while the other five victories to his credit were scored by one or another of his observers. These eight victories were scored between 17 July and 30 October 1918, amounting to two Germany airplanes set afire and destroyed and six driven down out of control.

For the 30 October air battle, during which both Anderson and his observer were wounded, Anderson was awarded the Distinguished Flying Cross. When gazetted postwar, the Distinguished Flying Cross citation read:

On 30 October this officer was one of an offensive patrol that attacked fifty enemy machines. Six of the latter concentrated their attack on Lt. Anderson, and would have inevitably destroyed his machine had it not been for the exceptionally able manner in which he manoeuvred and fought. Although both he and his observer were wounded and the machine badly damaged, he succeeded with rare courage and skill in shooting down one and keeping the remainder at a distance. Eventually he brought his machine safely to ground about half a mile within our lines."

== Post World War I ==
Anderson was transferred to the unemployed list of the Royal Air Force on 1 February 1919.

Anderson became famous in the chess problem world, having begun composing problems as early as 1912. He published three books on chess problems, a collection of his own problems entitled "Adventures of my chessmen 1914-23", a 1959 collection of Kriegspiel problems entitled "Are there any?" and a 1971 collection of problems by American composer Vincent Lanius Eaton, with whom he established a composing partnership in the 1950s while stationed at the British Embassy in Washington. In addition, the British Chess Problem Society published a collection of his problems in 1974 entitled "A tribute to G.F.Anderson". He also played against World Champion Alexander Alekhine in 1946 in Lisbon, a day before Alekhine died.

Voctionally, he became an accountant and later joined the Foreign Office, serving in the British Embassies in Lisbon, Teheran and Washington. On 25 June 1932 he was appointed as a liquidator of Parkhill Publicity Limited.

On 18 December 1953, he was appointed an Officer in Her Majesty's Foreign Service. One of his diplomatic posts was Washington, D.C.

On 1 January 1959, while serving as Second Secretary of Her Majesty's Embassy in Washington, D.C., Gerald Frank Anderson was inducted into the Order of the British Empire.

On 5 April 1971, Anderson's wife Lilian Madge died in Rapallo, Italy.

Anderson died in Hove, England, on 23 August 1983.
