= No. 487 Squadron RNZAF =

No. 487 (NZ) Squadron RAF
- Active: 15 August 1942 – 19 September 1945
- Country: United Kingdom
- Allegiance: New Zealand
- Branch: Royal Air Force
- Role: Bomber
- Mottos: Māori: Ki te mutunga (Translation: "Through to the end")
- Anniversaries: 15 August 1942

Commanders
- Notable commanders: Irving Smith

Insignia
- Squadron Badge: A tekoteko holding a bomb
- Squadron Codes: EG (Aug 1942 – Sep 1945)

Aircraft flown
- Bomber: Lockheed Ventura de Havilland Mosquito

No. 487 (NZ) Squadron was a light bomber squadron established for service during the Second World War. It was a New Zealand squadron formed under Article XV of the Empire Air Training Plan. Although many of its flying personnel were largely drawn from the Royal New Zealand Air Force, the squadron served in Europe under the operational and administrative command of the Royal Air Force as part of Bomber Command. Formed in mid-1942, it operated the Lockheed Ventura and then the de Havilland Mosquito and took part in over 3,000 operational sorties before being disbanded at the end of the war in late 1945.

== Background ==
In the mid-1930s, the Royal Air Force (RAF) was in the process of expanding and required an increasing number of suitable flying personnel. A number of schemes were implemented for New Zealanders to obtain short-service commissions in the RAF with the intention of then transferring to the Royal New Zealand Air Force (RNZAF) in the future. This led to over 500 New Zealanders serving in the RAF by the time of the outbreak of the Second World War.

At around the same time there was discussion between the governments of Britain, Australia, Canada and New Zealand to facilitate the co-ordination of training of air crew in the event of hostilities. This led to the implementation of the Empire Air Training Scheme (ETAS) in December 1939. Under this agreement, New Zealand committed to initially supply 880 full trained pilots for the RAF, with another 520 pilots being trained to an elementary standard annually. As each of the Dominion governments desired its personnel to serve together, the ETAS had a clause, Article XV, that allowed for the establishment of squadrons with personnel from the respective countries. In theory, the Dominions would supply the ground crew as well as flying personnel. However, in New Zealand's case, there was a reluctance to maintain RNZAF squadrons in Britain so the decision was made to allow for the formation of squadrons within the RAF designated as being New Zealand. These squadrons, known as Article XV squadrons, were formed around a cadre of New Zealand flying personnel already serving in the RAF but supplemented by newly trained pilots from the RNZAF, with administrative and ground crew being predominantly British.

== Formation ==
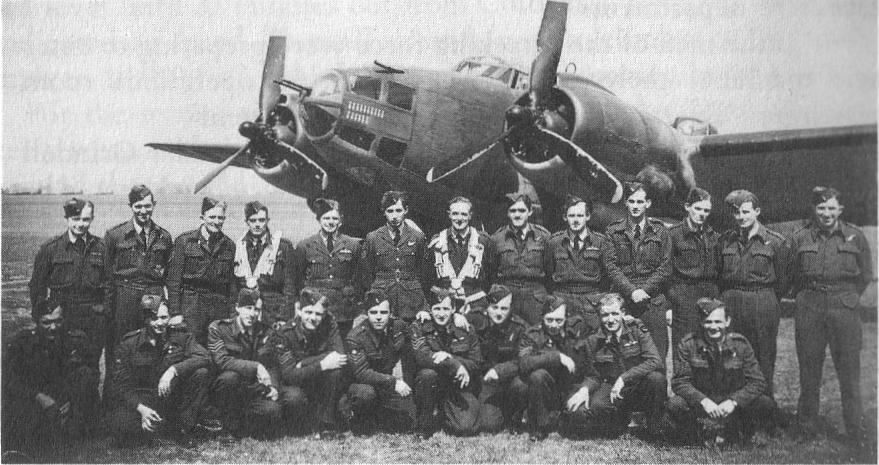
Non-commissioned officers of No. 487 Squadron at RAF Methwold in early 1943

No. 487 Squadron was formed as a light bomber unit in August 1942 as part of Bomber Command's No. 2 Group. Under the command of Wing Commander F. Seavill, most of its flying personnel were from the RNZAF although there were others from the RAF, the Royal Canadian Air Force and the Royal Australian Air Force. It was based at Feltwell, a station in Norfolk that was commanded by Group Captain Kippenberger, a New Zealander.

The squadron was initially equipped with Lockheed Ventura light bombers which were nicknamed "Flying pigs" on account of the generous space in its airframe. The Ventura, an update of the Lockheed Hudson, acquired a poor reputation in Europe as its performance was not really in the same league as British and German aircraft of the period.

== Operational history ==
No. 487 Squadron commenced operations in December, with its first sortie being as part of Operation Oyster. Mounted on 6 December, this was a sixteen-plane raid on the Phillips factory at Eindhoven, in the Netherlands. The squadron provided thirteen of the aircraft involved and lost three of them, including the one flown by Seavill. With the squadron now led by Wing Commander G. Grindell, further operations followed. Its first operation of 1943 was on 22 January, when three Venturas attacked an airfield, near Cherbourg. One crashed into the Channel after being damaged by flak, killing all but one of the crew. The squadron shifted to Methwold on 3 April and promptly resumed operations, with twelve aircraft bombing Caen the next day.

=== Ramrod 16 ===
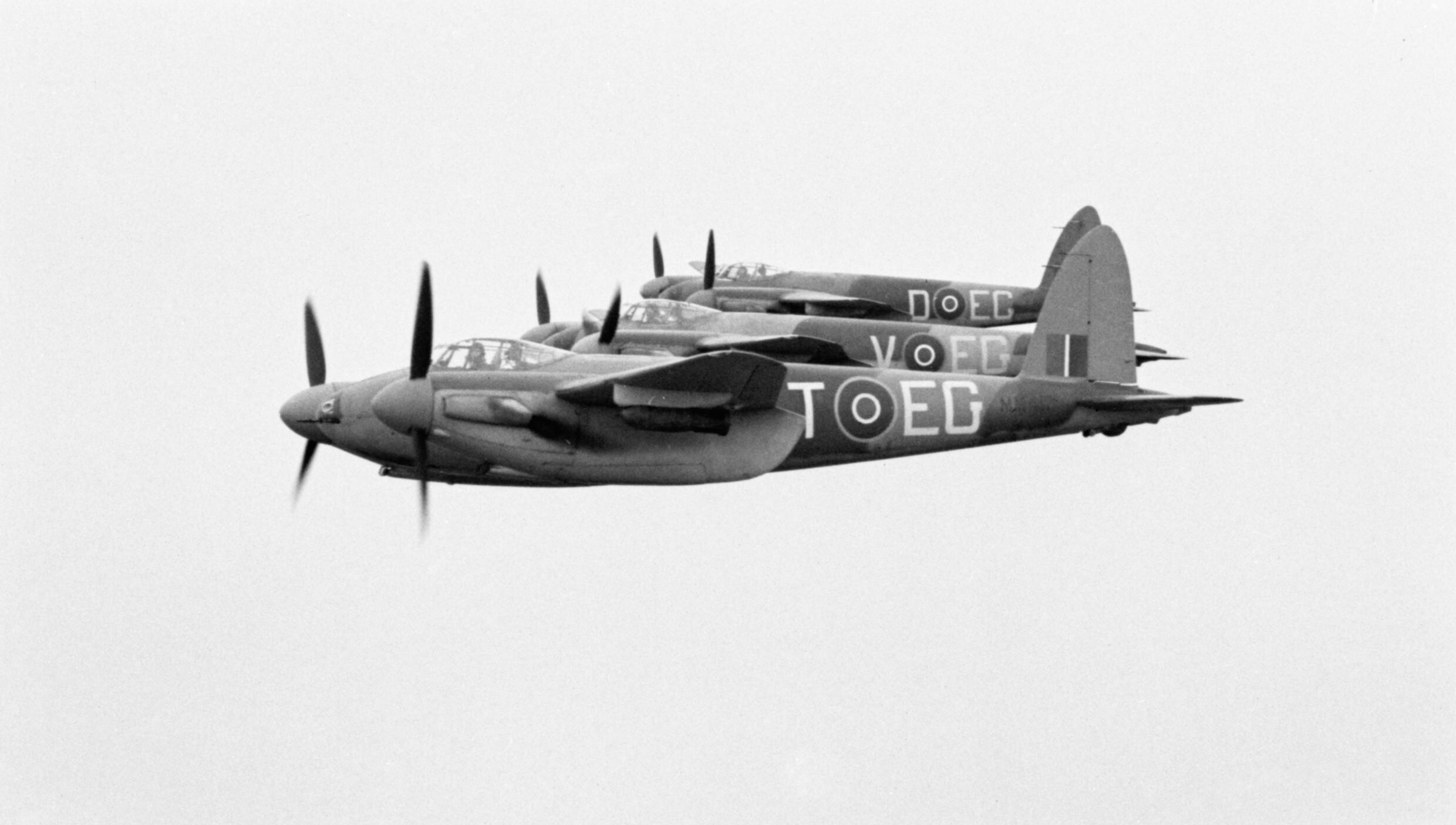
De Havilland Mosquito fighter-bombers of No. 487 Squadron

Disaster came on 3 May, when an eleven-aircraft Ramrod raid – one to be continued regardless of losses – against Amsterdam, designated Operation Ramrod 16, resulted in the loss of all but one of the squadron's Venturas. After crossing the Dutch coast, the Venturas were bounced by a group of 70 to 80 German fighters. They penetrated the Spitfire escort and got in amongst the bombers, damaging one and forcing it to return to base. The squadron pressed on, with further losses; by the time the Venturas had begun their bomb run, only five aircraft remained. The Germans then proceeded to pick them off, although they fought back as best they could, with Squadron Leader Leonard Trent downing one attacker with his machine-guns as the German fighter flew across his nose. Finally, only Trent's aircraft remained in the air. Reaching the target, he pressed home his attack, dropping his payload – narrowly missing the target, but causing some damage – before he too was shot down. For his leadership during the raid, Trent was later awarded the Victoria Cross. He survived being shot down and was taken prisoner; he later took part in the "Great Escape".

=== Service with the 2nd Tactical Air Force ===
In June 1943, No. 487 Squadron was transferred to the 2nd Tactical Air Force (2TAF), which was raised as part of the Allied preparations for the forthcoming invasion of France. Its first sortie with the 2TAF was on 12 June, a bombing mission to Caen aerodrome. After one final mission later in the month, the squadron moved to Sculthorpe and began converting to the De Havilland Mosquito heavy fighter in anticipation of starting nighttime intruder missions. It became operational on 3 October, when it sortied to Pont Chateau, near Nantes, successfully bombing a power-station without loss.

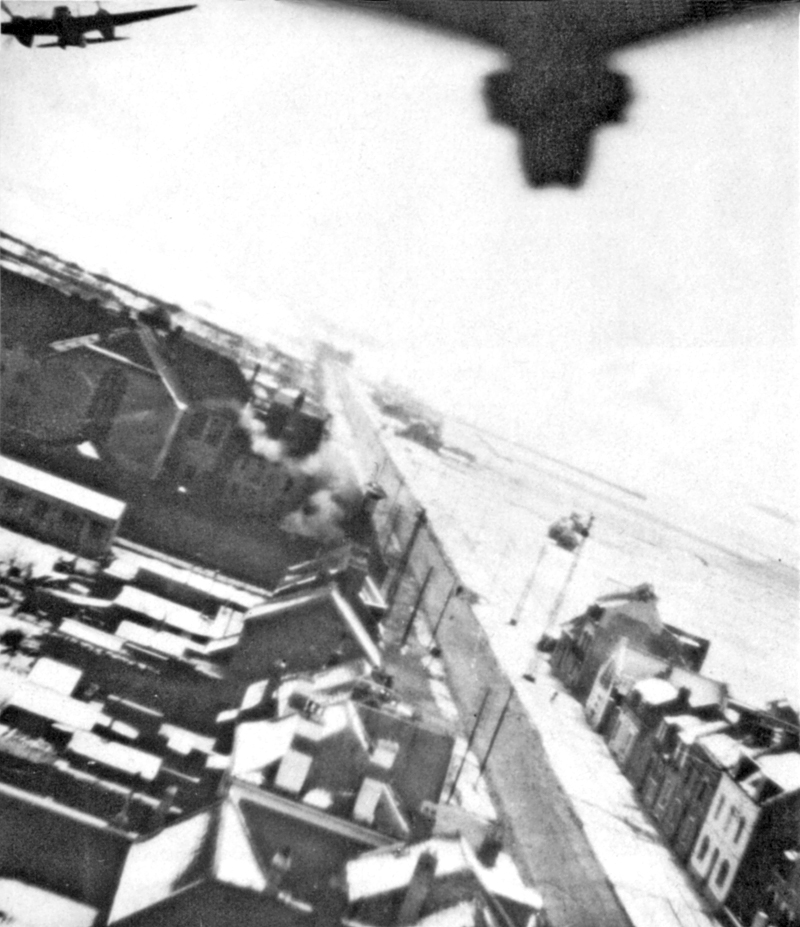
Mosquitoes over Amiens during Operation Jericho

Back on operations and flying from RAF Hunsdon, on 18 February 1944, No. 487 Squadron took part in Operation Jericho, a raid on the Amiens prison intended to facilitate the escape of the members of the French Resistance, held there as prisoners and scheduled for execution. During the raid, bombs dropped by the squadron destroyed a wall and enabled over a hundred prisoners to escape. On 31 October 1944 the squadron destroyed the Gestapo headquarters at Aarhus, destroying German intelligence records about Resistance activities. In February 1945, in order to stay in touch with the advancing Allied armies, the squadron shifted its base to liberated Europe, moving to Rosières-en-Santerre in France. The Gestapo headquarters in Copenhagen received the same treatment on 21 March.

No. 487 Squadron flew its last operational mission on the night of 2–3 May 1945, launching a thirteen-plane raid on Itzeloe, Heide, and Elmshorn. It was disbanded on 19 September 1945. Its aircraft and those of its New Zealand aircrew who wished to remain in the RAF became No. 16 Squadron retrospectively, and some weeks later, No. 268 Squadron.

=== Operational summary ===
During the course of its operational career in the war, No. 487 Squadron flew 3,112 sorties, which amounted to 7,892 hours in combat. In addition to the Victoria Cross awarded to Trent, aircrew of the squadron were awarded seven Distinguished Flying Crosses (DFC), a bar to a DFC, a Distinguished Service Order and a Distinguished Flying Medal.

The squadron's Māori motto was Ki te Mutunga, which is translated into English as "Through to the End". The squadron code was "EG".

== Commanding officers ==
The following served as commanding officers of No. 487 Squadron:

- Wing Commander F. C. Seavill (August–December 1942);
- Wing Commander G. J. Grindell (December 1942–May 1943);
- Wing Commander A. G. Wilson (May 1943–February 1944);
- Wing Commander I. S. Smith (February–August 1944);
- Wing Commander R. C. Porteous (August 1944–January 1945); and
- Wing Commander W. P. Kemp (January–August 1945).

== Surviving aircraft ==
One No. 487 Squadron aircraft is known to survive, this being de Havilland Mosquito FB. VI HR339 (later NZ2382), which flew with the squadron in the latter part of 1944 and early 1945. The fuselage was reported to have rotted, though leaving substantial remains, and the wings and fuselage aft of the leading edge were used by the Ferrymead Aeronautical Society, in Christchurch, to rebuild NZ2328.
