= Irving Smith (RAF officer) =

New Zealand Second World War flying ace

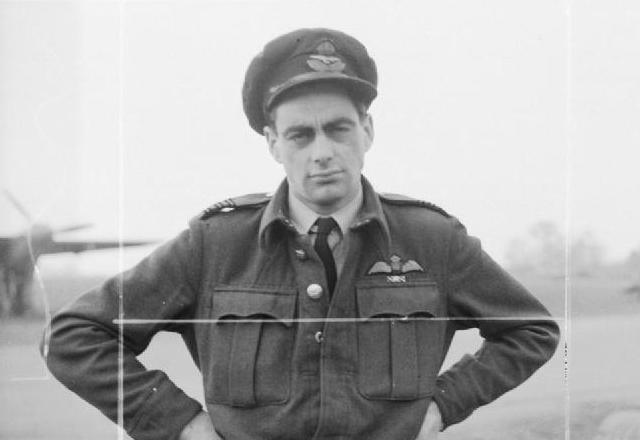
- Irving Smith, commander of No. 487 Squadron
- Born: 21 May 1917; Invercargill, New Zealand
- Died: 16 February 2000 (aged 82); Devon, England
- Military career
- Allegiance: New Zealand
- Branch: Royal New Zealand Air Force (1939–1940); Royal Air Force (1940–1966)
- Rank: Group Captain
- Nickname: Black
- Commands: RAF Jever; RAF Church Fenton; No. 56 Squadron; No. 487 (NZ) Squadron; No. 151 Squadron
- Conflicts: Second World War; Battle of Britain; The Blitz; Operation Jericho; D-Day landings
- Awards: Commander of the Order of the British Empire; Distinguished Flying Cross & Bar; Mention in despatches

Irving Stanley Smith CBE, DFC & Bar (21 May 1917 – 16 February 2000), was a New Zealand flying ace of the Royal Air Force (RAF) during the Second World War. He was credited with the destruction of eight German aircraft. He was also involved in Operation Jericho, an air raid on a German-controlled prison in Amiens, France.

Born in Invercargill, New Zealand, Smith joined the Royal New Zealand Air Force in early 1939 but was sent in England for training and subsequently gained a short service commission with the RAF. He flew Hawker Hurricane fighters with No. 151 Squadron during the Battle of Britain. The squadron switched to night fighting duties during the Blitz and by 1942 he was its commander. He spent most of 1943 on staff duties but returned to operations in February 1944 as commander of No. 487 (NZ) Squadron which operated the de Havilland Mosquito fighter-bomber. He led it for the most of 1944, including during Operation Jericho and in air support duties for the D-Day landings in Normandy. The final months of the war was spent on instructing duties. Having gained a permanent commission in the RAF, he held a series of flying and administrative posts in the postwar period until his retirement in 1966. He later farmed in Devon and died in 2000, at the age of 82.

== Early life ==
Born in Invercargill, New Zealand, on 21 May 1917, Irving Stanley Smith was the son of Albert Edgar and Helen Ann Smith. The family later moved north to Whangārei, where he was educated at Whau Valley School and then went on to Whangarei Boys' High School. After training at Seddon Memorial Technical School, he was working as an apprentice coachwork painter in Auckland when he was accepted for a short service commission in the Royal New Zealand Air Force in January 1939. He commenced training at Māngere in May, but soon went to England for flight training with the Royal Air Force (RAF).

== Second World War ==
In September 1939, and with the Second World War now underway, Smith was at No. 10 Elementary Flying Training School at Yatesbury, learning to fly on Tiger Moth trainers, before going on to No. 2 Flying Training School at Brize Norton in the following year. Smith was granted a short service commission in the RAF on 23 March as an acting pilot officer. In July 1940, with his flight training completed, he was posted to the RAF's No. 151 Squadron with his rank confirmed as a pilot officer. His new unit was based at North Weald and flew the Hawker Hurricane fighter.

=== Battle of Britain ===
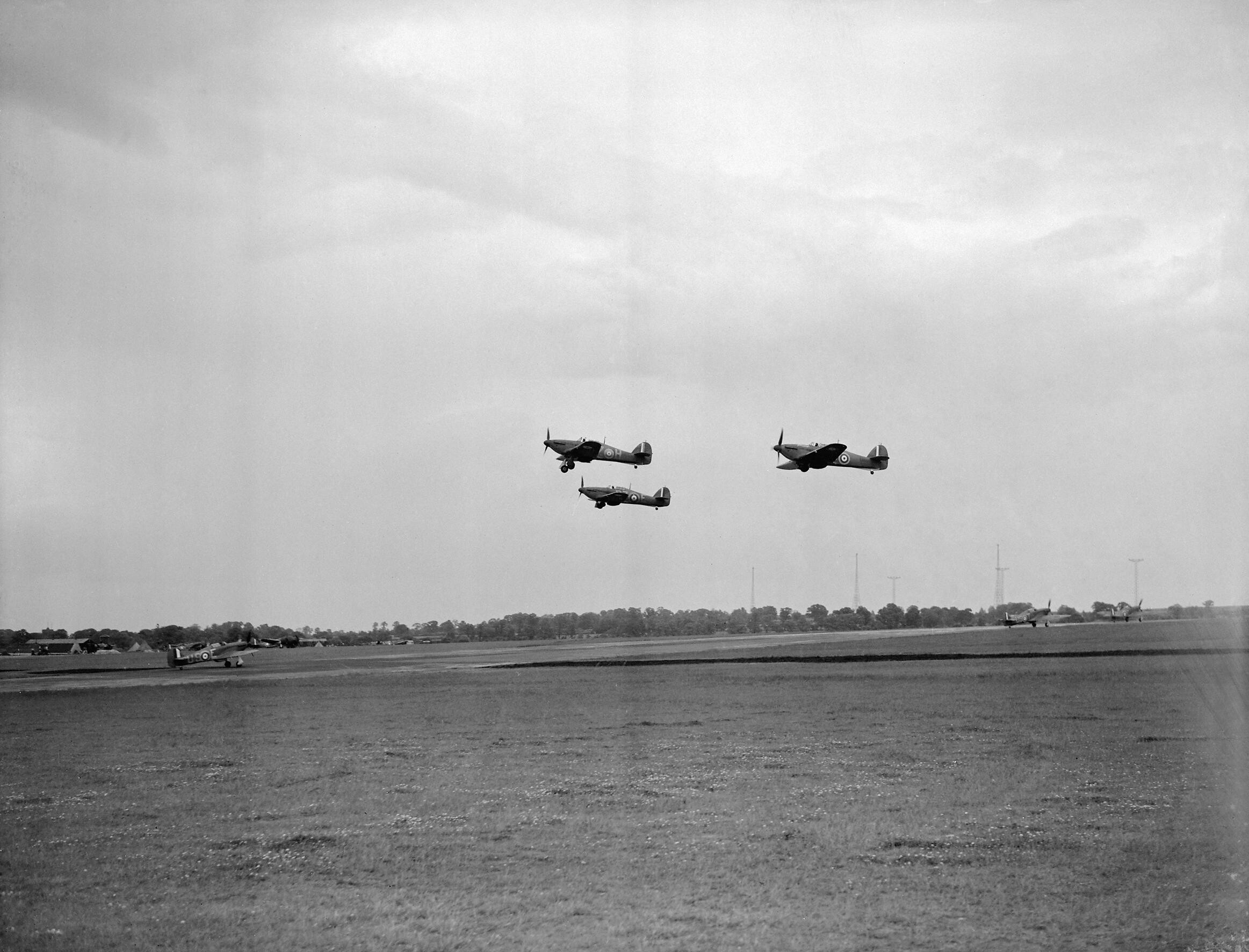
Hawker Hurricanes of No. 151 Squadron taking off from its airfield at North Weald

During the Battle of Britain, No. 151 Squadron was heavily engaged, often over the Thames Estuary, intercepting incoming bombing raids mounted by the Luftwaffe. On 15 August Smith destroyed two Messerschmitt Bf 109 fighters in separate patrols. He also damaged a Bf 109. He shot down a Heinkel He 111 medium bomber on 24 August. A week later during a dogfight, he and his wingman forced the pilot of a Bf 109 into a mistake that saw the German aircraft crash into the ground. At this stage, the squadron had been operating from Stapleford for a week and from here on 31 August Smith flew four sorties; on the first of these he destroyed a Dornier Do 17 medium bomber and on another damaged a second Do 17. The next day, the squadron was shifted north to Digby for a rest.

Many experienced pilots had been lost in the previous weeks and these were replaced with volunteers from Fairey Battle squadrons, with Smith and his fellow veterans helping bring them up to operational status. No. 151 Squadron soon returned to operations, initially carrying out convoy patrols. On 2 October, Smith, while flying a training sortie with his section, intercepted a He 111 that had just bombed the Rolls-Royce factory at Derby. Although the bomber was flying in cloud, he had detected the disturbance in the cloud formation caused by its tail fin. Using this as a guide, he went into the cloud and, flying on instruments, opened fire upon feeling the turbulence of the He 111. He then dropped out of the cloud and saw the bomber descending as well, with a damaged engine. He attacked again and his efforts saw the He 111 crashing into shallow waters off Chapel St Leonards. The crew all swam to shore. (Note: The engines of this He 111 were recovered in the 1960s and were displayed at the Newark Air Museum and Lincolnshire Air Museum. The airframe itself, which was visible at low tide, was destroyed in 1973 by the Royal Navy, as it was deemed to be a hazard.)

=== The Blitz ===
By November, the Luftwaffe had significantly increased its nighttime bombing raids and in response, a number of squadrons, including No. 151 Squadron, switched to a night-fighting role. It converted to the Boulton Paul Defiant fighter but in addition to its two flights of this type retained one, commanded by Smith, of Hurricanes. From December, and operating from Wittering, the squadron was tasked with protecting the Midlands region. During this time, on 7 March 1941, Smith was awarded the Distinguished Flying Cross (DFC). By this time he was nicknamed 'Black', to distinguish him from another pilot with the same name; that pilot was nicknamed 'White'.

During the heaviest raid of The Blitz, which targeted London on 10 May, Smith shot down a He 111, his first success at night. By the middle of the year he had been promoted to acting flight lieutenant and commanded a combined flight of Defiants and Hurricanes. The squadron was now co-operating with No. 1453 Flight which flew Turbinlite-equipped Douglas A-20 Havoc aircraft. The use of the Turbinlite in an airborne role was only of limited success and was later abandoned.

On 19 February 1942, Smith was promoted to acting squadron leader and took command of No. 151 Squadron. The same day, while flying a Defiant, he led the squadron in a patrol, providing cover for a convoy making its way along the Norfolk coast. Sighting German bombers attacking the convoy, he maneuvered his Defiant into a position where his gunner shot down a Do 17 and damaged a Junkers Ju 88 medium bomber. In April, the squadron stood down from operations for a time while converting to the de Havilland Mosquito heavy fighter but was back in action again by the end of the following month. By this time Smith had been promoted, to acting wing commander. He destroyed a He 111 and Dornier Do 217 medium bomber on 24 June, (Note: According to aviation historians Christopher Shores and Clive Williams, both these destroyed aircraft were Do 217s.) and another He 111 was probably destroyed the same night. In mid-July, he was awarded a Bar to his DFC. The citation for the bar read:

One night in February, 1942, this officer accomplished excellent work during an engagement with hostile aircraft which attempted to attack a convoy. He destroyed 1 and damaged another of the raiding aircraft. During a patrol one night in June 1942, Wing Commander Smith destroyed 2 and probably destroyed a third enemy aircraft. In all his combats, he has displayed great judgement, skill and courage. He is a most efficient flight commander and a fine leader.

— London Gazette, No. 35634, 17 July 1942.

In March 1943, Smith was placed on staff duties at Bentley Priory, the headquarters of Fighter Command. His work involved predicting RAF losses in its fighter operations but he soon requested a return to operations. He was given command of the Mosquito-equipped No. 488 Squadron in September but this was rescinded when Group Captain Basil Embry, who thought highly of Smith, requested his services for a training role at No. 2 Group.

=== Command of No. 487 Squadron ===
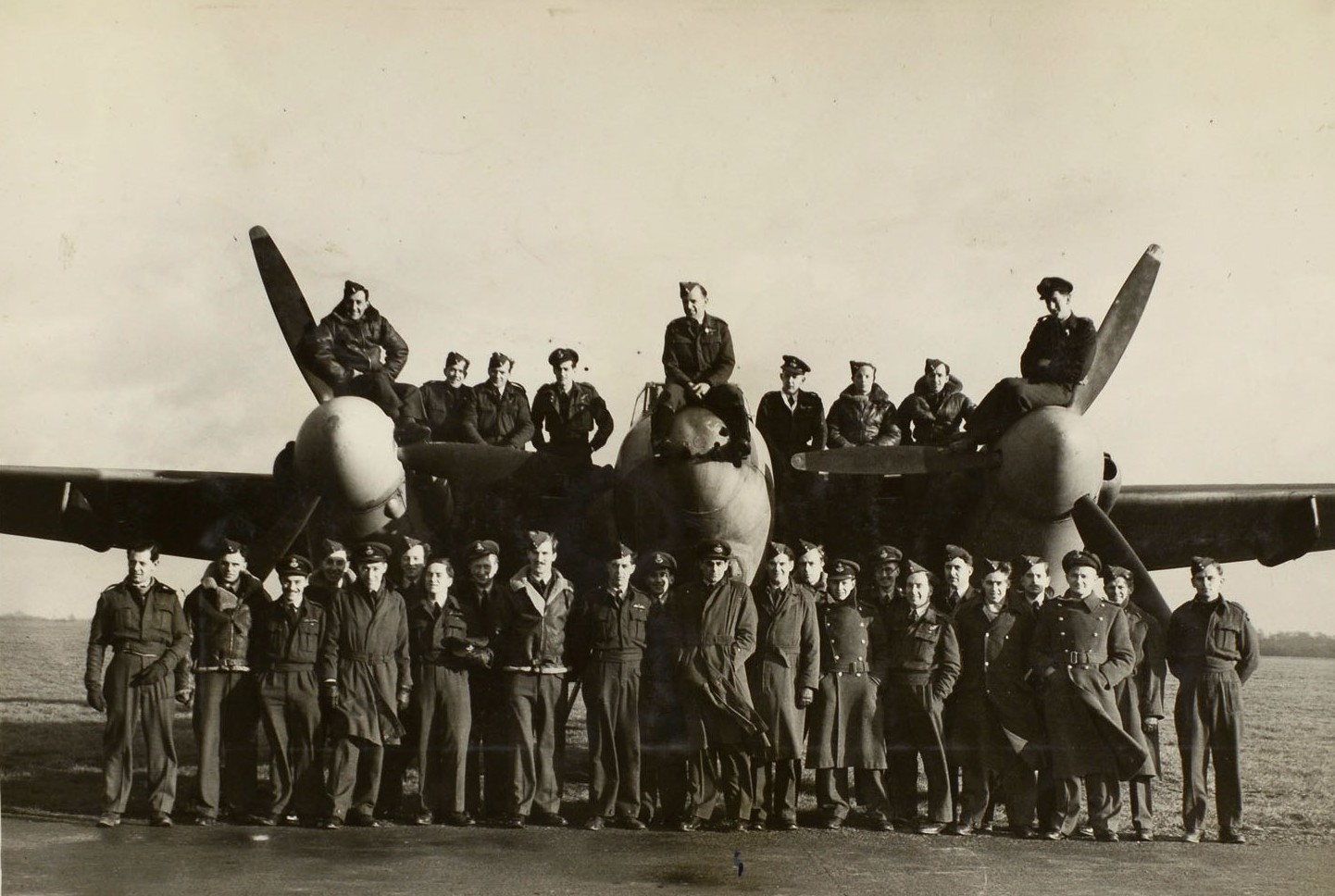
Personnel of No. 487 Squadron in front of a de Havilland Mosquito, February 1944

Smith eventually returned to operations as commander of No. 487 Squadron in February 1944. His new charge was part of No. 2 Group, and was one of the squadrons of No. 140 Mosquito Wing at Hunsdon. At the time, it was switching from daylight operations to a nighttime intruder role and many of its subsequent missions involved attacking enemy airfields in occupied France and Holland.

Shortly after Smith's arrival, No. 140 Wing was tasked with executing Operation Jericho; this was a low-level raid on the prison at Amiens, the objective being to destroy the walls so that more than 100 members of the French Resistance, held as prisoners with many sentenced to death, could effect an escape. The raid was carried out on 18 February, and involved all three Mosquito squadrons of the wing; along with No. 487 Squadron, these were Nos. 21 and 464 Squadrons. Smith led seven Mosquitos of his squadron, which was the first to attack the prison; they successfully breached the east and north walls with bombs. The following No. 464 Squadron breached the prison buildings, allowing the French inside to escape. No. 21 Squadron was not required to drop its bombs. As the Mosquitos departed, they were intercepted by Focke-Wulf Fw 190 fighters. All those of No. 487 Squadron managed to return safely, although not without some being damaged, but some of the other aircraft participating in the raid were shot down. One was that of Group Captain Percy Pickard, the station commander at Hunsdon. Over half of the captive resistance fighters were able to gain their freedom along with many of the other prisoners.

Due to the loss of Pickard, Smith became acting station commander at Hunsdon and also briefly commanded No. 140 Wing. In May, Smith, having relinquished his acting commands, and his squadron were transferred from No. 2 Group to the 2nd Tactical Air Force and commenced operations in support of the forthcoming invasion of Normandy. At night it continued to target the Luftwaffe airfields in France, Belgium and Holland, and in the six weeks prior to D-Day, it mounted 30 such missions, without losing any aircraft. During daylight hours it attacked the launching sites for flying bombs and transport infrastructure. On the night of 5 June, just prior to D-Day, several raids were mounted on targets in Caen and Saint-Lô and in the days afterwards it sought to destroy German forces moving to the Allied beachhead established at Normandy. Smith also led a sortie, requested by operatives of the Special Air Service working covertly in occupied France, on 11 June to Châtellerault where he and two other Mosquitos bombed trains transporting petrol. By the end of August, at which time Smith relinquished command of the squadron, it had flown over 900 missions.

=== Later war service ===
After leaving No. 487 Squadron, Smith was placed on instructing duties and sent to No. 13 Operational Training Unit which provided crews trained on Mosquitos for No. 2 Group. He remained in this role until the conclusion of the war, ending the conflict credited with the destruction of eight German aircraft, one probably destroyed and four damaged. Once the war in Europe had concluded, he was granted a permanent commission in the RAF with the rank of squadron leader. At the end of the year he was mentioned in despatches in the New Year Honours.

== Postwar service ==
Early in 1946 Smith attended the RAF Staff College in Haifa and later in the year was assigned to a staff role at Air Headquarters in Malta. He was back in the United Kingdom for staff training in 1948, attending the Army Staff College at Camberley. At the start of 1950, he was appointed commander of No. 56 Squadron, which operated the Gloster Meteor from Waterbeach. By the middle of the year he had taken a wing commander (flying) role at Tangmere and a few months later assumed a similar appointment at Wattisham. He was appointed station commander at Church Fenton in January 1952. Later that year, he was appointed an Officer of the Order of the British Empire in Queen's Birthday Honours.

Smith served as a staff officer at Fighter Command headquarters from June 1953 until the start of 1956, at which time he was posted to the United States of America on an exchange program with the United States Air Force. He attended the Armed Forces Staff College at Norfolk and then served at Tactical Air Command at Langley Air Force Base. Returning to the United Kingdom in 1958, he was promoted to group captain that August and took command of the RAF station at Jever, in Germany. In the Queen's Birthday Honours of 1961, Smith was appointed a Commander of the Order of the British Empire. Shortly afterwards he was assigned to the headquarters of Signals Command in a staff role. In 1964 he was sent to attend the National Defence College at Kingston, Ontario, in Canada.

== Later life ==
Retiring from the RAF on medical grounds in February 1966, Smith settled in Devon where he took up farming. He died on 16 February 2000. He was predeceased by his wife, Joan née Debenham, a former officer in the Women's Auxiliary Air Force who he had married in London in November 1942, and one of his two daughters. His son, Rupert Smith, was a general in the British Army who served as deputy supreme commander of Allied Forces Europe at NATO headquarters.
