= Leonard Trent =

New Zealand aviator and VC recipient

Group Captain Leonard Henry Trent VC DFC
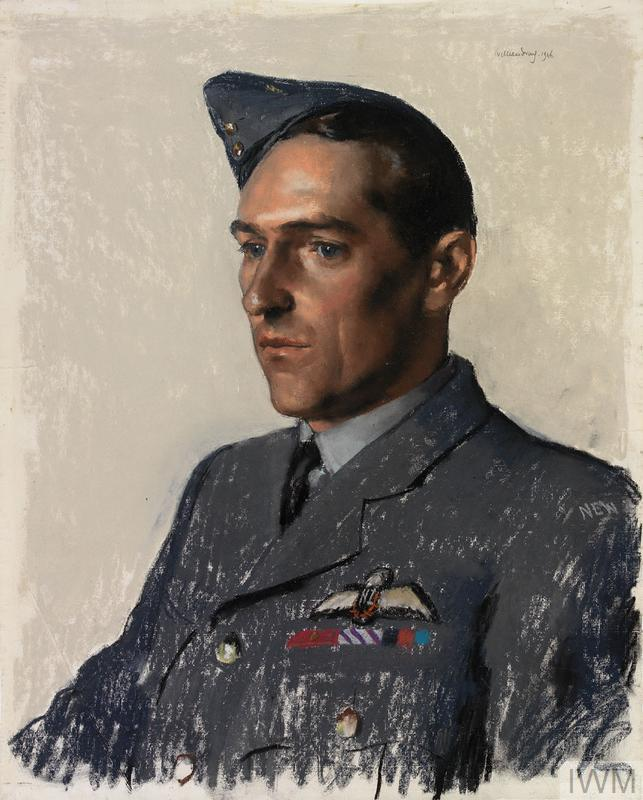
- Portrait of Leonard Trent, 1946, by William Dring
- Born: 14 April 1915; Nelson, New Zealand
- Died: 19 May 1986 (aged 71); Takapuna, New Zealand
- Burial place: Fremantle Cemetery, Western Australia
- Military career
- Allegiance: United Kingdom; New Zealand
- Branch: Royal Air Force (1938–1945; 1948–1965); Royal New Zealand Air Force (1946–1947)
- Service years: 1938–1965
- Rank: Group Captain
- Units: No. 487 (NZ) Squadron
- Commands: No. 214 Squadron (1956–1958); RAF Wittering (1960–1962)
- Conflicts: Second World War; Phoney War; Battle of France; Operation Ramrod 16; Suez Crisis
- Awards: Victoria Cross; Distinguished Flying Cross

Group Captain Leonard Henry Trent, VC, DFC (14 April 1915 – 19 May 1986) was a New Zealand aviator, senior Royal Air Force officer, and recipient of the Victoria Cross (VC), the highest award for gallantry in the face of the enemy that can be awarded to British and Commonwealth forces.

Born in Nelson, Trent obtained a short-term commission in the Royal Air Force (RAF) in 1938 after receiving flying training in New Zealand. After travelling to England, he was posted to No. 15 Squadron RAF and was sent to France shortly after the outbreak of the Second World War, flying Fairey Battles on photo-reconnaissance missions into Germany. After his squadron returned to England and converted to Bristol Blenheims, he flew several bombing missions during the Battle of France for which he was later awarded the Distinguished Flying Cross (DFC). Afterwards he spent several months on instructing duties before being posted to No. 487 (NZ) Squadron in August 1942, which operated Lockheed Venturas. He was shot down over Amsterdam while on a bombing mission, codenamed Operation Ramrod 16, on 3 May 1943, becoming a prisoner of war.

After the war, he was awarded the VC for his actions during Ramrod 16. He continued to serve with the RAF and was commander of No. 214 Squadron during the Suez Crisis. He retired in June 1965 and lived in Australia, and then New Zealand, in his later years. He died in 1986, aged 71.

== Early life ==
Leonard Henry Trent was born in Nelson, New Zealand, on 14 April 1915, the son of Leonard Trent, a dentist, and his wife Irene née Everett. In April 1919 the family relocated to Tākaka, along the shore of Golden Bay. Three years later, his father paid for Trent to take a short flight in a Gipsy Moth piloted by Malcolm C. McGregor, a fighter ace of the First World War, and subsequently Trent became interested in flying. He was educated at Nelson College, boarding at the school from 1928. Not particularly academically inclined he became increasingly interested in golf and in his final year at school, in 1934, won the Nelson Golf Club Senior Championship.

Trent had intended to go to university to study dentistry, but the family could not afford to pay for his studies and he instead took up a position as a clerk in the administrative office of an abattoir in Hastings. He gave up the work after a year and returned to Nelson to assist his father in his dental practice. After a time he moved to Wellington taking up office work again. He was soon earning enough money that he could afford to go to night school and study aero engineering and maintenance.

== Early service career ==
In early 1937, in response to an advertisement in a newspaper, Trent applied for a short-term commission in the Royal Air Force (RAF). He passed a selection interview and subsequent medical test and in August was accepted for flying training. Induction training was with the Royal New Zealand Air Force (RNZAF) and was held at Taieri, near Dunedin, where he flew Gipsy Moths and Miles Magisters. Trent then undertook flight training at the RNZAF's Wigram Air Base in Christchurch, flying Avro 626 and Vickers Vildebeest aircraft. He gained his wings on 12 May 1938 and a month later he sailed for Britain to join the RAF. He was granted a short-service commission of five years in the rank of pilot officer on 23 August 1938.

Posted to No. 15 Squadron RAF, which operated Fairey Battles out of Abingdon in Berkshire, Trent spent the next few months learning bombing and reconnaissance flying techniques. In February 1939, he spent three months at Hamble, near Southampton, attending a navigation course. Here he met Ursula Woolhouse, while playing golf at the local club in his downtime.

== Second World War ==
In early September 1939, following the outbreak of the Second World War, No. 15 Squadron flew to France as part of the RAF Advanced Air Striking Force. Stationed at Vraux, the squadron was to fly high-level photo-reconnaissance missions over enemy territory, collecting information on German airfields, factories and major infrastructure. Trent flew his first mission into Germany on 24 September 1939, No. 15 Squadron's first operational sortie of the war. This period of the war was known as the Phoney War, and much the squadron's flying revolved around training and practice bombing missions. The squadron was sent back to England in early December to convert to the Bristol Blenheim IV, a light bomber, operating from Wyton.

Initial conversion work was on the Bristol Blenheim I and during this time Trent had to make an emergency landing, having become lost in overcast conditions while on a flight to Scotland. In March 1940, he was promoted to flying officer. The squadron returned to operations when the Germans invaded France and the Low Countries on 10 May 1940. That day he flew one of three aircraft that bombed German forces at an aerodrome near Rotterdam. Further missions followed, including a bombing raid on bridges over the Albert Canal that saw six of the twelve participating aircraft destroyed. On another mission, his aircraft suffered damage from flak and an attacking Messerschmitt Bf 109 fighter and he put down at an airfield on the way back to his base for repairs. However, advancing Germans threatened the airfield and as night fell, he and his crew had to fly to England as they could not navigate back to their base in France. On 23 May, casualties in the squadron saw Trent take command of one of its flights in conjunction with a promotion to acting flight lieutenant. He led several bombing sorties while Operation Dynamo, the evacuation of the British Expeditionary Force from Dunkirk, was in effect and by mid-June had flown 14 sorties. Exhausted, he was sent on leave.

On his return to duty, Trent was posted to No. 17 Operational Training Unit, stationed at Upwood, as an instructor. He taught trainees formation flying and made navigational flights in Avro Ansons. He also had the opportunity to fly other aircraft; these included the Wellington bomber. In the meantime, his relationship with Ursula Woolhouse continued to grow and on 7 August 1940 the couple were married at Holborn, London. The previous month he had been awarded the Distinguished Flying Cross for his outstanding performance during the Battle of France.

In March 1941, his flight lieutenant rank was made substantive and six months later Trent received a new posting at the Operational Training Squadron at Warboys. He helped assess the Douglas Boston bomber for service in the RAF; on his first flight in the aircraft, it suffered an engine fire forcing an immediate return to his base. Trent returned to operational duty in March 1942 and, promoted to temporary squadron leader on 1 June, was assigned to Headquarters, No. 2 Group RAF. He found the duty dull and began to seek a position at No. 88 Squadron where a friend of his was the squadron leader.

=== Service with No. 487 Squadron ===
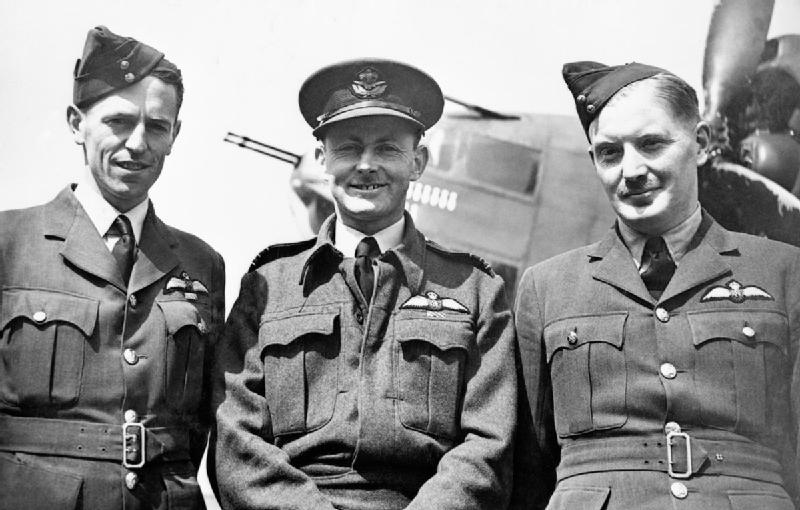
Squadron Leader Trent (left) with Wing Commander G. J. "Chopper" Grindell (centre) and Squadron Leader T. Turnbull (right) in 1943

In August 1942, the RAF established a new bomber squadron, designated No. 487 (NZ) Squadron, based at Feltwell in Norfolk. An Article XV squadron, many of its flying personnel were New Zealanders, although other nationalities also served with the squadron. Trent, still hoping for a posting to No. 88 Squadron, was instead sent to No. 487 Squadron as one of its flight commanders. The squadron was to operate Lockheed Venturas; these were unpopular aircraft, being relatively slow and demanding to fly, with an inadequate defensive armament. Although the senior officers in the squadron were experienced flying personnel, many crew members were novices and needed extensive practice in formation flying before reaching an acceptable standard for operational duties. The squadron flew its first mission in December, a raid on a factory at Eindhoven in the Netherlands. Over the next several months, the squadron flew raids to targets in France and the Low Countries.

On 3 May 1943 the squadron flew a bombing mission, codenamed Operation Ramrod 16, on a power station in Amsterdam. The mission was intended to be as a diversion for another raid being carried out almost simultaneously on a power station at Ijmuiden. "Ramrod" was a term designating a daylight bombing mission, with a fighter escort, that targeted a specific objective. The twelve participating Venturas, led by Trent, were to cross the Dutch coast at sea level, escorted by six squadrons of Supermarine Spitfires. Two more squadrons of Spitfires were to provide top cover for the Venturas over the target, with all of the aircraft keeping to sea level as they approached the Dutch coast so as to avoid showing up on German radar, before climbing to reach bombing height. However, the Spitfires flying top cover mistimed their departure from England, arriving early and failing to keep low enough when reaching the Dutch coast. This alerted the German defences.

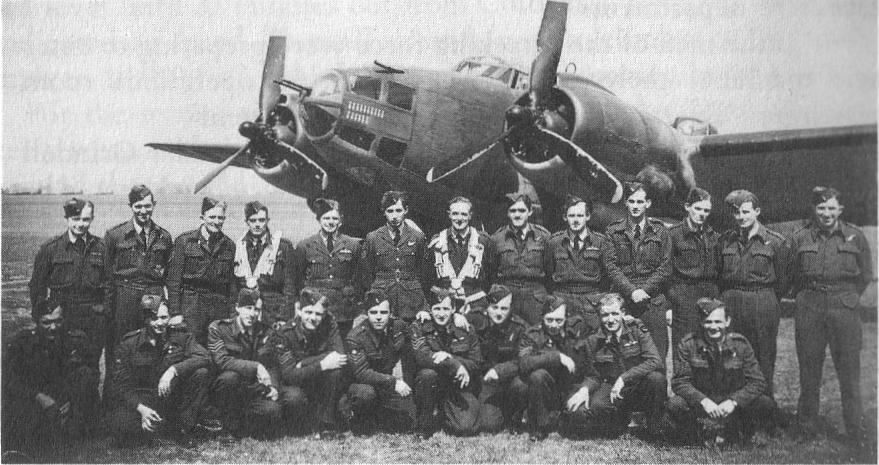
Non-commissioned officers of Trent's No. 487 Squadron, with a Ventura at RAF Methwold, early 1943

One Ventura had returned to England with a malfunction and as the eleven remaining aircraft of No. 487 Squadron approached Amsterdam, they and their escorts were set upon by Bf 109s and Focke-Wulf Fw 190s, 70 aircraft in all. The top cover, arriving well before the Venturas, had already been recalled having run low on fuel. The Fw 190s dealt with the escorting Spitfires while the Bf 109s targeted the bombers. Under constant attack by the German fighters, No. 487 Squadron continued on to its target, with only five aircraft making it to Amsterdam to commence their bombing run. Only Trent successfully completed his run, and in doing so shot down one Bf 109 with the forward machine guns of his Ventura. Immediately afterwards, his own aircraft was hit and put into a spin. As the Ventura broke up, Trent and his navigator were thrown clear at 7,000 feet (2,100 m) and became prisoners of war (POW). The remaining crew members, trapped in the aircraft, were unable to exit and were killed when it crashed.

=== Stalag Luft III ===
Trent was sent to Stalag Luft III, a POW camp well to the southeast of Berlin, in what is now Żagań, in Poland. He soon became involved in the various escape attempts mounted by the POWs, helping conceal the sand extracted from tunnels that were under construction.

He took part in the "Great Escape" of 24 March 1944. On exiting the tunnel, he had planned with another POW, Mike Shand, to head to Switzerland via Czechoslovakia and Austria. He was the 79th POW to pass through the escape tunnel, just behind Shand. However, as he was exiting the tunnel, a German guard thwarted his escape and Trent was recaptured almost immediately and placed in solitary confinement. The majority of the successful escapees were eventually recaptured, the Germans executing 50 of them. By January 1945, the Soviet forces were advancing into Germany and the POWs at Stalag Luft III were force marched away to the west to a camp near Bremen. They were moved again in April but were liberated by the British on 2 May 1945.

Trent returned to England on 7 May and went on leave for two months before reporting back for duty with the RAF. Preferring active flying to instructional duties, he requested a post at Transport Command. He qualified as a Douglas Dakota pilot and then spent a few months at Syerston, a paratrooper training school. In late 1945, Trent transferred back to RNZAF service. He wanted to pursue a career in the military and felt that the RNZAF offered better remuneration and promotion opportunities than the RAF.

== Victoria Cross ==
On his return to duty, Trent had provided a written debrief on the Ramrod 16 raid. After considering Trent's statements on the Ramrod 16 raid and other evidence collected by the Air Ministry, the commander of No. 2 Group, Air Vice-Marshal Basil Embry, recommended him for the Victoria Cross (VC). Instituted in 1856, the VC was the highest gallantry award that could be bestowed on military personnel of the British Commonwealth. Having been informally advised that he was to be a recipient of the VC earlier that day, Trent's award was publicly announced on 1 March 1946. The citation for Trent's VC was published in the London Gazette and read:

On 3 May 1943, Squadron Leader Trent was detailed to lead a formation of Ventura aircraft in a daylight attack on the power station at Amsterdam. This operation was intended to encourage the Dutch workmen in their resistance to enemy pressure and the target was known to be heavily defended. The importance of bombing it, regardless of enemy fighters or anti-aircraft fire, was strongly impressed on the aircrews taking part in the operation. Before taking off Squadron Leader Trent told the deputy leader that he was going over the target whatever happened. All went well until the eleven Venturas and their fighter escort were nearing the Dutch Coast. Then one bomber was hit and had to turn back. Suddenly large numbers of enemy fighters appeared. Our escorting fighters were hotly engaged and lost touch with the bombing force. The Venturas closed up for mutual protection and commenced their run up to the target. Unfortunately the fighters detailed to support them over the target had reached the area too early and had been recalled. Soon the bombers were attacked. They were at the mercy of fifteen to twenty Messerschmitts which dived on them incessantly. Within four minutes six Venturas were destroyed. Squadron Leader Trent continued on his course with the remaining three aircraft, and in a short time two more Venturas went down in flames. Heedless of the murderous attacks and of the heavy anti-aircraft fire which was now encountered, Squadron Leader Trent completed an accurate bombing run, and even shot down a Messerschmitt at point blank range. Dropping his bombs in the target area he turned away. The aircraft following him was shot down on reaching the target. Immediately afterwards his own aircraft was hit and went into a spin and broke up. Squadron Leader Trent and his navigator were thrown clear and became prisoners of war. The two other members of the crew perished. On this, his twenty-fourth sortie, Squadron Leader Trent showed outstanding leadership. Such was the trust placed in this gallant officer that the other pilots followed him unwaveringly. His cool unflinching courage and devotion to duty in the face of overwhelming odds rank with the fine examples of these virtues.

— The London Gazette, No. 37486, 26 February 1946

Trent, with his wife present, received the VC from King George VI in an investiture ceremony at Buckingham Palace on 26 March 1946.

== Post-war service career ==
In late 1946, Trent and his family travelled by sea to Auckland in New Zealand for a period of extended leave before commencing service with the RNZAF. As a VC recipient, he attended a number of civic functions around the country and had his portrait painted by Archibald Nicoll. Once his leave had finished, his initial work for the RNZAF was as part of a committee to select fliers for service with the RAF, which was seeking to augment its ranks with experienced personnel. The RAF was also increasing rates of remuneration for its personnel and when it offered Trent a permanent commission, he accepted. He returned to England with his family, which now included a son, in late 1947 and resumed his career in the RAF with the substantive rank of flight lieutenant.

Trent was posted to Bircham Newton, a Transport Command station, as an instructor to help prepare students to fly Dakotas. In September 1948, having been promoted to the substantive rank of squadron leader earlier in the year, he was sent to Dishforth which trained pilots to fly the Avro York transport. He flew several operations during the Berlin airlift but soon began to suffer from ankylosing spondylitis which required specialist treatment for a few months before he could return to duty.

Now posted to Flying Training Command, in August 1950 Trent undertook refresher and leadership courses before going on to Central Flying School early the following year. Trent returned to Feltwell, where he had been based while at No. 487 Squadron, in March 1951. He was chief instructor at No. 3 Flying Training School, teaching students to fly the Harvard trainer. In October 1952, he was appointed squadron commander of No. 4 Squadron, which was based at Little Rissington and operated de Havilland Vampires. The following year, he was awarded the Queen Elizabeth II Coronation Medal, promoted to wing commander and posted to Oakington where he instructed on Gloster Meteors. While there, he had to bail out of a Meteor which had gone into an unrecoverable spin. Not long afterwards, in early 1954, with the flight school having re-equipped with Vampires, Trent had to again bail out when he lost control of his aircraft.

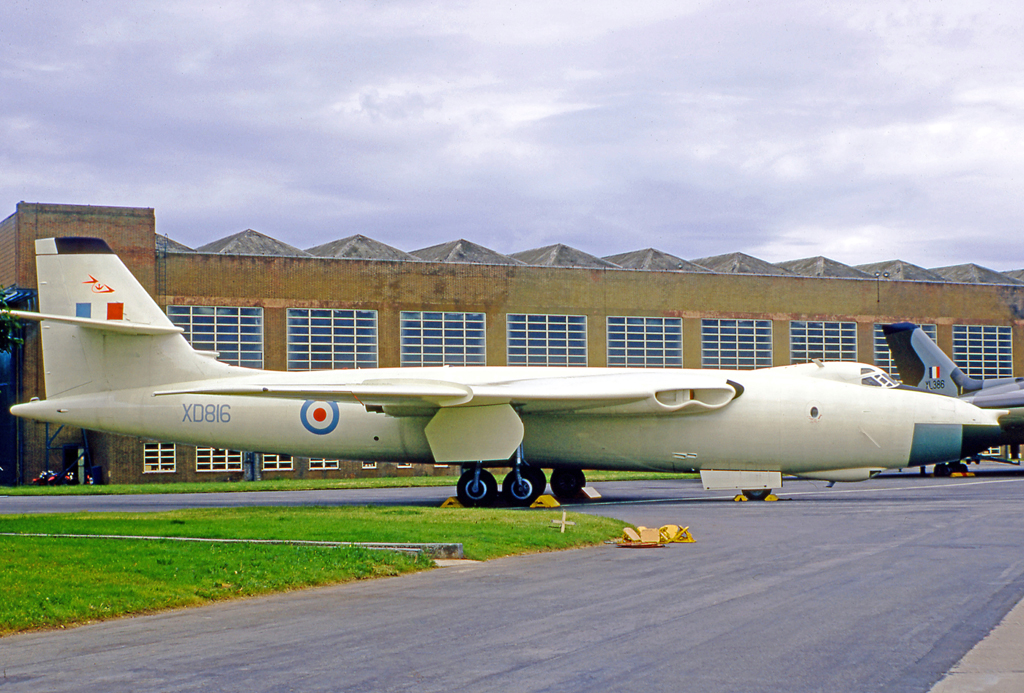
A Vickers Valiant of No. 214 Squadron

In early 1956, after attending a six-month course at No. 6 Flying College Course at Manby, Trent was appointed commander of No. 214 Squadron, which was the first unit to be equipped with the new Vickers Valiant. Later that year, in October, his squadron was dispatched to Malta due to the outbreak of the Suez Crisis and flew a number of missions into Egypt. The squadron returned to England at the end of year when tensions eased. In March 1958, he flew a Valiant to New Zealand as part of the celebrations for the twenty-first anniversary of the founding of the RNZAF. The next month, he took up a post as Wing Commander Training at No. 3 Group Headquarters at Mildenhall and was promoted to the rank of group captain on 1 July 1959.

Trent was appointed station commander at RAF Wittering in April 1960. He still occasionally flew Valiants, including taking one on a goodwill tour to the United States. He then served as an air attaché, representing Bomber Command at the British Embassy in Washington, D.C. from mid-1962, and on 12 June the same year, he was appointed an air aide-de-camp to the Queen. As the Queen never visited Washington, D.C. during his tenure there, he was never called upon to serve in this role. After three years, his service in the United States ended and he retired from the RAF on 23 June 1965.

== Later life ==
Following his retirement in 1965, Trent moved his family to Western Australia. With his wife, he later returned to New Zealand to live at Matheson Bay, north of Auckland. He died on 19 May 1986 at North Shore Hospital, survived by his wife and two children. He was cremated and his ashes were taken to Western Australia, where they were interred at Fremantle Cemetery alongside those of his daughter, Judith, and his wife, Ursula.

Trent's medals, including the VC, are held by the Air Force Museum of New Zealand at Wigram in Christchurch. There is a memorial to Trent at the airport in Nelson, his home town, and there is also a plaque honouring him in Queens Gardens in Dunedin.
