= Operation Ramrod 16 =

Operations of RAF during World War

Ramrod 16
- Part of The Second World War
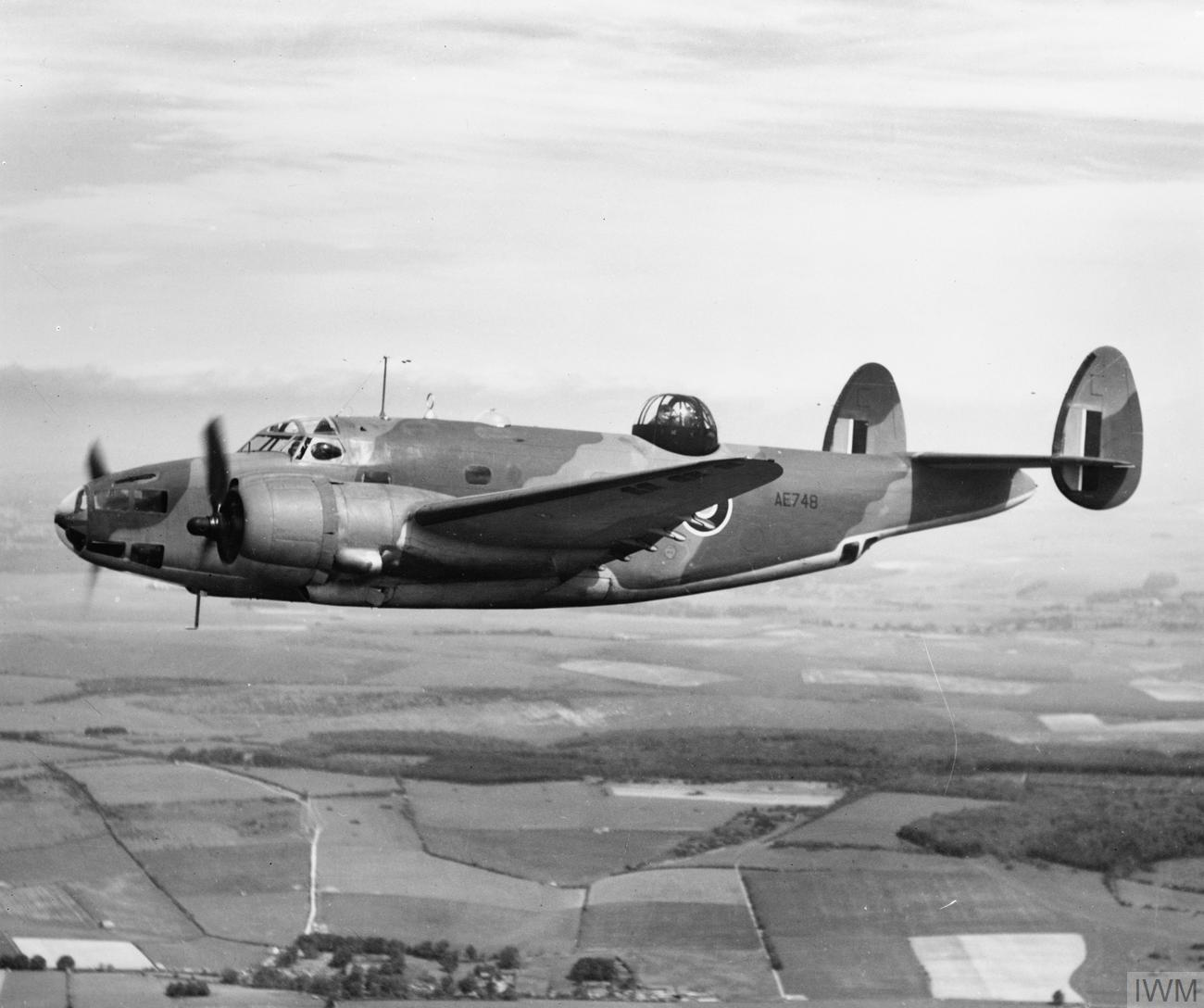
- An RAF Lockheed Ventura
Date	3 May 1943
Location	Amsterdam, Netherlands 52°22′N 4°16′E
Result	German victory

Belligerents
(United Kingdom) Royal Air Force (Dominion of New Zealand) Royal New Zealand Air Force	(Nazi Germany) Luftwaffe

Commanders and leaders
(United Kingdom) Leonard Trent	(Nazi Germany) Gordon Gollob

Strength
5 Spitfire squadrons 7 Boston IIIA; 12 Lockheed Ventura bombers	70 fighter aircraft

Casualties and losses
10 Venturas lost near the target, one written off 28 aircrew killed, 12 PoW; 1 Spitfire lost; pilot killed	1 Bf 109, 3 Fw 190s

Ramrod 16 was an attempt by the Royal Air Force (RAF) to bomb the Koninklijke Hoogovens (Royal Blast Furnaces) steelworks at IJmuiden in the Netherlands during the Second World War. After several recent abortive attacks a more elaborate plan was made for six Douglas Boston IIIA light bombers of 107 Squadron to attack again, with a Ramrod as a diversion. (Ramrod was the RAF term for bomber operations intended to induce Luftwaffe fighters into action for British fighter escorts to attack.) Ramrod 16 was to be flown by twelve Lockheed Ventura Mk II bombers of No. 487 Squadron RNZAF against the Hemweg power station in Amsterdam, not far upriver from IJmuiden.

Thirteen Spitfire squadrons from 11 Group, Fighter Command, were to fly Rodeo 212 to Vlissingen (Flushing), 78 mi (126 km) to the south-west of Amsterdam, as another diversion. The Venturas were to be escorted by three squadrons of Spitfires from 12 Group, Fighter Command. Two squadrons of high-flying Spitfire Mk IXs were to wait off the Dutch coast, available for contingencies and eight Mustang fighters were to protect the Bostons on their return from IJmuiden, three more Spitfire squadrons covering the return of the Venturas.

The raid began in the late afternoon of 3 May 1943 but Rodeo 212 arrived early and at height, alerting the Germans. The first three 107 Squadron Bostons missed the IJmuiden steelworks but the second formation obtained direct hits. The Venturas of 487 Squadron got ahead of most of their escort and met an unexpectedly large number of German fighters, the local contingent having, by coincidence, been temporarily reinforced. All but one of the Venturas were shot down before bombing and a German Messerschmitt Bf 109 fighter was shot down by the last Ventura, flown by Squadron Leader Leonard Trent, whose bombs overshot the power station; Trent was shot down moments later.

Morale of the three Ventura squadrons in 2 Group was severely shaken by the losses but 487 Squadron was rebuilt, returned to operations at the end of the month and was re-equipped with de Havilland Mosquitos later in the year. The full story of the raid became known when Trent was repatriated from a German prison camp in 1945. Trent was awarded a Victoria Cross and his navigator, Flight Lieutenant Vivian Phillips, received a Distinguished Service Order.

== Background ==
=== Bomber Command, 1939 ===
On 4 September 1939, five out of ten Bristol Blenheim bombers were shot down making low-level attacks on German warships in daylight, along with two out of fourteen Vickers Wellington bombers. On 29 September, five Handley-Page Hampden bombers flew another raid against German warships and all were shot down. Few operations were possible in October and November due to weather but on 3 December, 24 Wellingtons were sent to attack German ships. The Wellingtons were intercepted by German Messerschmitt Bf 109 and Messerschmitt Bf 110 fighters and engaged by German anti-aircraft guns (FlaK); no bombers were lost and one Bf 109 was claimed shot down, later confirmed by German records. On 14 December, Wellingtons made another attack and five were shot down, another crashing in England. On 18 December, 22 Wellingtons attacked again, flying at 10,000 ft (3,000 m) to evade FlaK, thought to be the main cause of recent losses. Flying at higher altitude and taking a longer route to avoid neutral territory, the Wellingtons were easier to detect by German radar. Around 100 German fighters were scrambled to intercept the bombers and the Wellingtons were intercepted by cannon-armed Bf 110s and machine-gun armed Bf 109Ds. In what became known as the Battle of the Heligoland Bight, eleven Wellingtons were shot down, one ditched in the North Sea and six crashed in England. Only one group of Wellingtons had bombed, the other had refrained to avoid civilian casualties; the Germans lost three fighters to return fire.

The extent of the loss "stunned" RAF leaders, exploding their belief that tight formations of bombers, equipped with machine-gun turrets, could defeat attack by day fighters. From January 1940, the Wellington and Hampden day bombers joined the specialist Armstrong-Whitworth Whitley night bombers in flying leaflet-dropping missions over Germany. The Fairey Battle and Blenheim light day bombers of the Advanced Air Striking Force in France and 2 Group in England also devoted considerable time to night-flying training. During the Battle of France the AASF and 2 Group flew day and night sorties, the Battles of the AASF suffering losses of 75 per cent by day from 10 to 14 May and 0.5 per cent by night. During the battle, the AASF lost 137 Battles and 37 Blenheims; 2 Group lost 98 Blenheims.

=== Leaning forward into France ===
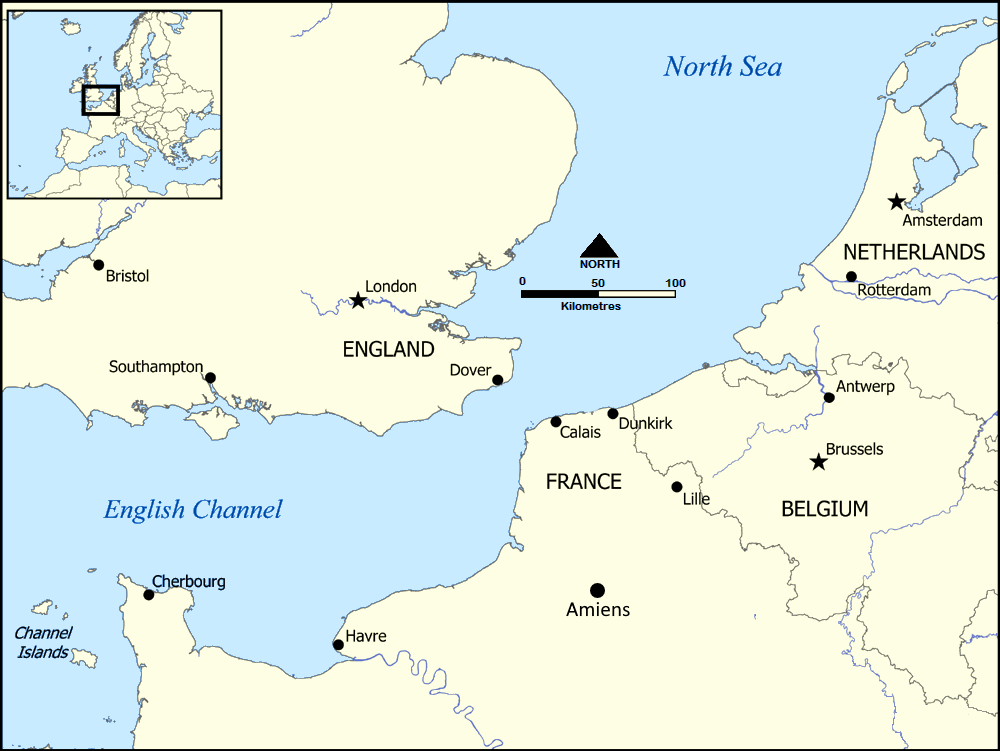
The targets of the operation lay almost due east of the squadrons' airfields in East Anglia

Following its victory in the Battle of Britain, 1940, Fighter Command began sending fighter squadrons over northern France, Belgium and the Netherlands to engage the Luftwaffe. The policy was known as "Leaning forward into France" and begun by Air Chief Marshal Sholto Douglas, who had replaced Hugh Dowding as Air Officer Commanding in chief Fighter Command on 25 November 1940. From December 1940, 11 Group flew Rhubarbs, raids by two or three fighters attacking targets of opportunity; Rodeos, fighter sweeps over enemy territory without bombers, which the Luftwaffe usually ignored and Circuses, small numbers of bombers from 2 Group, escorted by large numbers of fighters. The objective of the operations was to attack ground targets, destroy any Luftwaffe fighters which opposed the raids and keep them in Western Europe. Ramrods were bomber sorties escorted by fighters, primarily intended to destroy a ground target and inflict losses by the escorts on German fighters trying to intervene.

From December 1940 to June 1941, Fighter Command flew 104 Rhubarbs and eleven Circuses. In Bomber Command only 2 Group still flew day bombers and Operation Barbarossa, the German invasion of the Soviet Union, beginning on 22 June, gave the group added significance. The Luftwaffe withdrew its squadrons from coastal airfields to bases further inland, from where they could decline combat or engage RAF fighters in places where the British fighters were at a tactical disadvantage for lack of fuel. To force the Luftwaffe to transfer fighter units from the Eastern Front and to inflict damage on communications in the west, the offensive over France was increased, Fighter Command devoting about a third of its aircraft to the operations until the end of the year. The effort was a failure, no German fighters being transferred from the USSR to reinforce the two Jagdgeschwader (fighter groups) in the west. The Fighter Command loss was 51 pilots by June 1941 but another 411 were lost by years' end, a greater loss than July to October 1940.

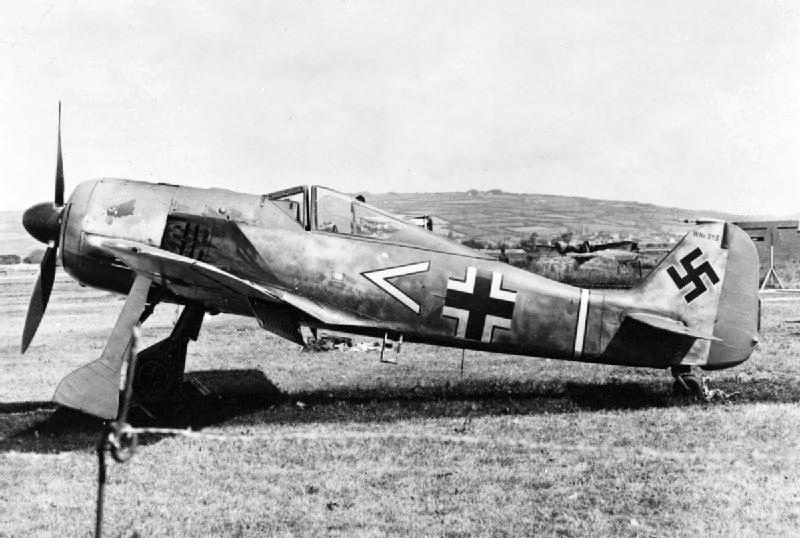
Captured Fw 190A-3 of JG 2 in Britain, 1942

Fighter Command made "enormously exaggerated estimates of German losses", from June to the end of December 1941 claiming 731 Luftwaffe aircraft against a real Luftwaffe loss of 154 aircraft, 51 of which were not lost to RAF action. By late January 1942, Luftwaffe transfers of day fighters and anti-aircraft units had been identified by the British and Ultra decryption of German signals coded with the Enigma machine uncovered the transfer of 30 of the newest German fighter type to the Russian front and 40 from the Pas de Calais to northern Norway for anti-convoy operations. The day offensive resumed on 24 March 1942 and received a vigorous reply from the Luftwaffe; by 19 April, Ultra decrypts had revealed a reinforcement of the western air front, of the 180 single-engined fighters in the Pas de Calais, 120 were the new Focke-Wulf Fw 190, which outclassed the Spitfire Mk V.

By mid-June, Fighter Command had suffered 259 losses for the loss of 58 German fighters, against Fighter Command claims to have destroyed 197. On 6 July, Ultra revealed that the Luftwaffe was struggling to supply aircraft to north Africa, had imposed limits on operations in Russia and ordered a vast increase in fighter output from the Wiener Neustädter Flugzeugwerke, which was taken to mean that the Fighter Command offensive had greatly contributed to the German difficulties. The offensive continued at a lesser rate, to tie down Fw 190 units and to maintain a measure of air superiority along the Channel coast, until the maximum effort during the Dieppe Raid (19 August 1942). In 2 Group, obsolete Blenheim bombers began to be replaced by faster and more versatile Douglas Boston, Lockheed Ventura and de Havilland Mosquito day bombers.

== Prelude ==
=== 2 Group raids ===
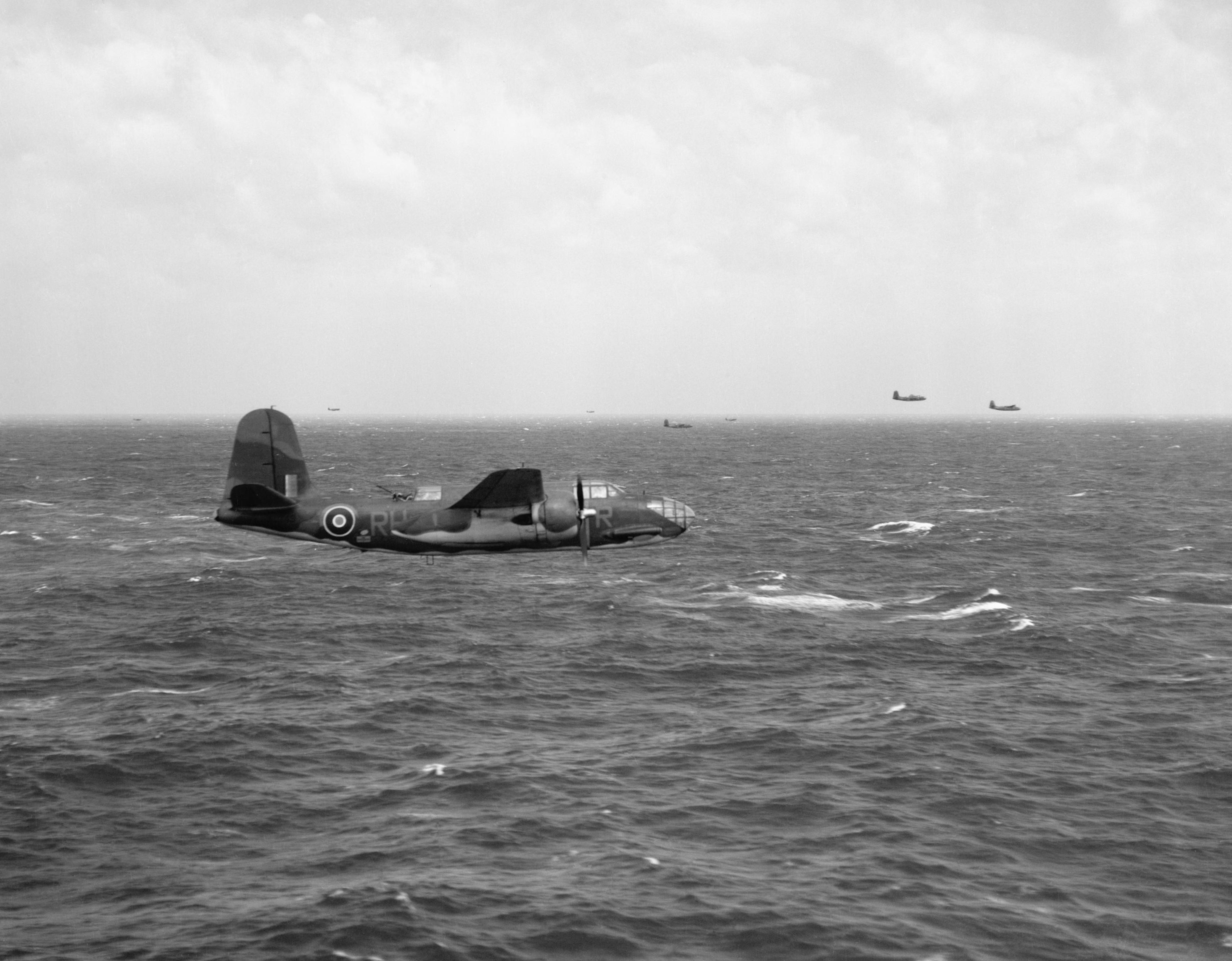
88 Squadron Boston Mark IIIs in 1942, low over the North Sea

The three squadrons of 2 Group equipped with Douglas Bostons, began replacing their aircraft with new Boston Mk IIIAs in March 1943, flying training sorties and sea search operations. (Note: The first Bostons in RAF service had been bought from the US in 1940 but the Mark IIIA was provided under Lend-Lease.) The first squadron to resume offensive operations was 107 Squadron on 1 May; Caen was attacked but the raid was thwarted by cloud cover. On 2 May, 107 Squadron attacked the Koninklijke Hoogovens (Royal Blast Furnaces) steelworks at IJmuiden on the coast, missed the works but hit barges and dock installations nearby. Spitfire Mk IXe fighters of 331 (Norwegian) Squadron claimed three Focke-Wulf Fw 190 fighters. (Note: The pilots were exiled Norwegians of the Free Norwegian forces flying as part of the RAF.) The Venturas of 464 Squadron (Royal Australian Air Force, RAAF) also attacked the steel works, escorted by the Spitfire Vbs of 118 Squadron. (Note: No. 464 Squadron was part of the Royal Australian Air Force, formed in the UK of aircrew from all parts of the Commonwealth. About one third of the personnel were Australian on its formation.) The bombers flew the usual wave top height approach over the North Sea then made a battle climb (a fast climb to bombing height). The Venturas received moderate Flak as they attacked, also missed the steelworks but hit the coking works, sulphate plant and other ancillary works, along with three ships, two of which sank. The Venturas were caught 40 nmi (46 mi; 74 km) out on the return journey by FW 190s, which damaged two of the bombers for two FW 190s claimed shot down by the escorts.

=== Plan ===
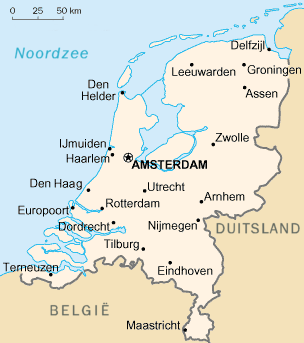
Map of the Netherlands showing Amsterdam, IJmuiden and Haarlem

Ramrod 16 was another attempt on the IJmuiden steelworks by six Boston IIIAs with a diversion provided by twelve Ventura Mk II bombers of 487 Squadron (Royal New Zealand Air Force, RNZAF) on 3 May. (Note: The commander of 2 Group, Air Vice-Marshal Basil Embry, called the Ventura "... thoroughly bad, being slow, heavy, un-manoeuvrable and lacking good defensive armament"; the crews called them Flying Pigs.) In bright blue skies, sunshine and a warm day, the fourteen crews of 487 Squadron were briefed for the raid at RAF Methwold their base in Norfolk. The crews were told that they were to attack the Hemweg power station (the Papaverweg Powerplant; 52.39786815883844, 4.900222647021094) at the north end of Amsterdam, about 17 mi (28 km) from IJmuiden, to "encourage the Dutch resistance to resist German pressure in Holland and to aid Dutch workmen in organising disobedience". Twelve aircraft were to fly on the operation with three Spitfire squadrons as close escort. The Ventura crews were told to expect determined opposition but to press on at all costs. B Flight, 487 Squadron, led by its commander, Squadron Leader Leonard Trent and the deputy flight commander, Flight Lieutenant A. V. Duffill, was to be followed by A Flight, the result of a coin toss with the A Flight commander, Squadron Leader Jack Meakin. The plan was to bomb at dusk for the Venturas to benefit from the gathering darkness and return under cover night.

The Venturas were to rendezvous over RAF Coltishall at 5:00 p.m. at an altitude lower than 1,000 ft (300 m) with the Spitfire Mk Vs of the close escort comprising 118 Squadron, 167 Squadron and 504 Squadron. The Spitfire Mark IX had a performance similar to that of the Luftwaffe Messersmitt Bf 109G and Focke Wulf 190A fighters but only ten Fighter Command squadrons had been equipped with it by mid-1943, due to shortage of engines and despatches to overseas squadrons. Most domestic Spitfire squadrons were left flying obsolete Mk Vs, restricted to close escort of bombers. The bombers were to fly at 190 kn (350 km/h; 220 mph) Indicated airspeed (IAS) for 33 minutes across the North Sea, keeping below German radar until they were ten minutes from the Dutch coast, then perform a battle climb (fast and steep) at 165 kn (306 km/h; 190 mph) to 10,000 ft (3,000 m) and head straight for the target, to retain a degree of surprise. Fighter Command operations to protect bombers consisted of target support (or forward support) a sweep by fighter squadrons kept available for contingencies, close escort with the bombers, high cover for the close escort and rear support to escort the bombers home and engage any German fighters when the other escorts were low on fuel and ammunition.

Target support was to be provided by the Supermarine Spitfire Mk IXbs of 122 Squadron and 453 Squadron RAAF flying a sweep along the coast west of the Ventura approach route. Thirteen fighter squadrons from 11 Group were to fly Rodeo 212 towards Vlissingen (Flushing) on the island of Walcheren to the south-west as a diversion. Rear support (waiting just off the coast) by three Spitfire squadrons to protect the Venturas on their return journey was to arrive in relays and orbit (circle) west of Zandvoort; seven Spitfire Vbs and Vcs of 302 (Polish) Squadron were to arrive at 5:30 p.m., returning at 6:55 p.m., twelve Spitfire Vbs of 306 (Polish) Squadron were to take over at 5:25 p.m. departing at 7:00 p.m. and twelve Spitfires of 308 (Polish) Squadron arriving from 5:20 p.m., were to turn for home at 6:50 p.m. Two relays of 613 Squadron Mustang Mk Is were to cover the withdrawal of 107 Squadron, four Mustangs arriving at 5:00 p.m. and returning at 6:40 p.m., the second four arriving at 5:15 p.m. and turning for home at 6:55 p.m. (Note: 107 Squadron (Boston IIIAs) was based at RAF Great Massingham; of the rear cover contingent, 613 Squadron was based at RAF Wellingore in Lincolnshire, 302 (Polish) Squadron at RAF Kirton in Lindsey in Lincolnshire, 306 (Polish) Squadron at RAF Hutton Cranswick in East Yorkshire, 308 (Polish) Squadron at RAF Church Fenton North Yorkshire. Of the close escort units, 118 Squadron was based at RAF Coltishall, 167 Squadron at RAF Ludham Norfolk and 504 Squadron at RAF Churchstanton. The target support squadrons (122 and 453) were based at RAF Hornchurch.)

== Raid ==
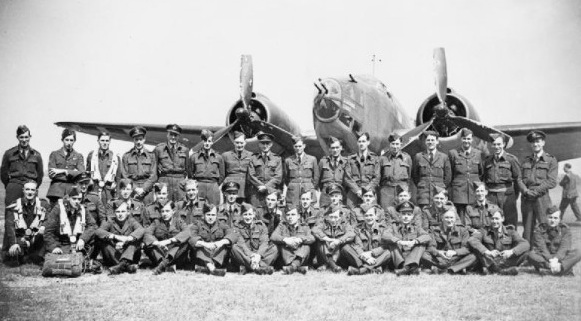
Aircrew of 487 Squadron before the raid, 1943

The twelve Venturas took off from RAF Methwold at 4:43 p.m. in clear weather but after five minutes Q-Queenie, flown by Sergeant A. G. Baker, turned back due to a fault with the escape hatch. The eleven remaining Venturas rendezvoused a few minutes later with the Spitfire escorts of the Coltishall Wing over RAF Coltishall nearer the coast. The Bostons of 464 Squadron also set off from Coltishall, flying much lower than the Venturas. Trent led the first six Venturas in a tight box formation, with the second group, led by Meakin, following. Thirteen fighter squadrons from 11 Group flying Rodeo 212 got their timing wrong and arrived at Vlissingen, 78 mi (126 km) to the south-west of Amsterdam, thirty minutes early, appearing on German radar and alerting the German fighter units. The Target Support Spitfire Mk IXbs of 122 Squadron and 453 Squadron RAAF were recalled at 5:30 p.m. when at 27,000 ft (8,200 m), 30 nmi (35 mi; 56 km) west of Zandvoort.

By coincidence, the Luftwaffe fighters in the Netherlands had been reinforced during a visit to Haarlem by the Reichskommissar of the Netherlands, Arthur Seyss-Inquart. A Luftwaffe conference was scheduled for that day at Schiphol airfield near Amsterdam and a great number of experienced fighter pilots were in attendance from other parts of the Western Front. The six Boston IIIAs of 107 Squadron had taken off at 4:52 p.m. and around 5:53 p.m. bombed the IJmuiden steel works in two vic formations of three aircraft each, the first vic hitting the ancillary switch and transformer stations, despite making their bomb runs at "nought feet". Bf 109 fighters and Fw 190 fighters intercepted the first vic as it re-crossed the coast but the evasive action of the Bostons enabled them to escape without loss. (Note: In 1942, at the Fighter Leader School, several experienced commanders devised an evasive manoeuvre for Bostons when at low altitude. Squadron Leader Pelly-Fry had developed a horizontal corkscrew which avoided the risk of flying into the sea. In the standard vic of three Bostons, the leader would porpoise (rise and fall) as the Bostons to the left and right flew the horizontal corkscrew. With training and good timing, the pilots of vics, boxes and squadrons could use the manoeuvre. In one test Spitfires spent 32 minutes attempting to intercept Bostons but failed. At the end of monthly Fighter Leader courses, a Boston squadron flew to RAF Charmy Down in Somerset for training in escort, interception and evasion, with 24 Spitfires as escorts and twelve as attackers, practising over the Bristol Channel, followed by a group discussion.) The second vic, attacking through intense FlaK released their bombs and hit the steel works, turned for home and ran into the German fighters, which shot down BZ227, the Boston flown by Flight Sergeant F. S. Harrop in flames; the other two Bostons escaped, noting a Ventura coming down in the water, apparently lost with all hands.

The eleven Venturas climbed at 5:35 p.m. just before reaching the Dutch coast with the three close escort Spitfire VB squadrons but 504 Squadron lagged by 3 nmi (3.5 mi; 5.6 km). When the bombers reached 12,000 ft (3,700 m) the target was visible ahead in the clear sky. As a precaution against a possible British attack on Seyss-Inquart, the German fighters were ordered off the ground and climbed at about the same time as the Venturas. German fighters were scrambled at 5:20 p.m. from Woensdrecht Airfield and were vectored to intercept the incoming formation off the coast. The German fighters included 24 Fw 190 fighters from II.Gruppe (2nd Group) of Jagdgeschwader 1 (JG 1, 1st Fighter Wing) and eight Bf 109 fighters from 2. Staffel (2nd Squadron) of Jagdgeschwader 27 (JG 27, 27th Fighter Wing). The fighters were led by Hauptmann (Captain) Dietrich Wickop, the Gruppenkommandeur (group commander) of II./JG 1.

Over the coast more than twenty German fighters from the three Staffeln of II./JG 1 fell on 504 and 167 squadrons of the close escort as thirty more headed for the Venturas. The Spitfires of 504 Squadron were still climbing when Fw 190s swept overhead and cut them off from the Venturas. The commander of the Coltishall Wing, Wing Commander Howard "Cowboy" Blatchford, tried to warn the bombers but they had already been surrounded by German fighters. A dog-fight began with Fw 190s diving on 167 Squadron; 504 Squadron, still climbing in the rear, did a 360° turn to lure the Fw 190s to no avail; 118 Squadron got as far as the west end of Amsterdam and was credited with two Fw 190s, 167 Squadron another. Blatchford's Spitfire was badly damaged and he came down in the sea 40 nmi (46 mi; 74 km) off Mundesley; his body was never found.

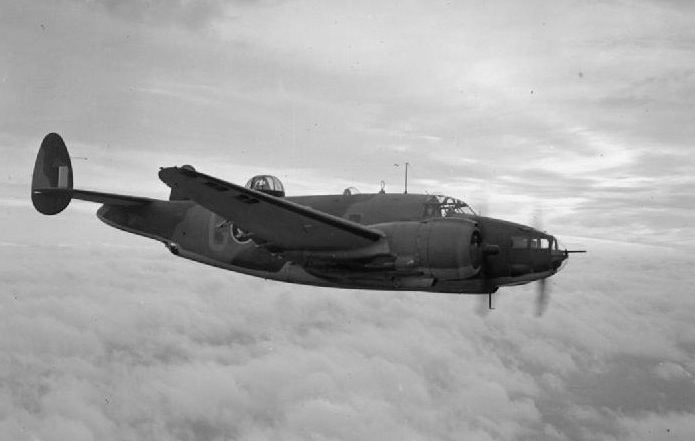
A Royal Air Force Ventura of 464 Squadron in 1943

The Ventura flown by Duffill was one of the first to be hit; cannon-fire destroyed the hydraulics, set both engines alight and seriously wounded the two gunners, after one had claimed a fighter. Duffill turned for home, followed by two A Flight Venturas, which were quickly shot down. Attacked by German fighters until well out over the North Sea, Duffill managed to keep the Ventura airborne and the navigator jettisoned the bombs. The fires died down and Duffill reached Methwold to land safely (the gunners were rushed to Ely Hospital and the crew was awarded immediate decorations). Within minutes of crossing the coast the Venturas were reduced to five aircraft; Flying Officer O. E. Foster was the pilot of one of the five aircraft left to begin the bomb run.

Foster saw the two Venturas in front of his aircraft explode and moments later his Ventura was hit and the bomb doors fell off, followed by the bombs. Foster turned for home and his Ventura was hit by anti-aircraft fire, which knocked out the starboard engine. Foster dived to avoid the German fighters but the ammunition containers for his forward-firing guns began to explode and blew the nose off. The navigator, Flying Officer T. A. Penn, was badly wounded and the rear gunner, Flight-Sergeant T. W. J. Warner was mortally wounded but got forward to report that his turret was out of action before he died. Foster managed to pull the Ventura out of a dive towards a harbour, only to find that he was in the middle of a German convoy. Foster cleared the ships but his controls were damaged and he could barely keep the Ventura in the air as he re-crossed the Dutch coast. The Ventura was leaking fuel and Foster ordered ditching stations; the port engine failed and the Ventura crashed into the sea and quickly sank. Foster, Penn and the wireless operator Sergeant R. W. Mann struggled out of the submerged aircraft. One of the crew recounted,

The dinghies were all damaged by cannon fire when we hit the sea. It was a terrible struggle to keep afloat. At first I could only get one glove and my helmet off, but after a struggle got one flying boot off and then after a considerable time managed to shake the second one away. All the time, I was screaming for help and can remember crying like a baby because I was too young to die. Goodness knows who I expected to hear us. Paddled away to keep afloat until I got terrible pains, but as soon as I stopped paddling sank and after a time I got so that my arms would not stop. After what seemed an age, one of the boys shouted that a boat was coming straight towards us. The next thing I recall is waking up in the engine room with a German officer staring at me and then blank again until I came to in hospital.

The German patrol boat picked up the three survivors a couple of hours after the crash.

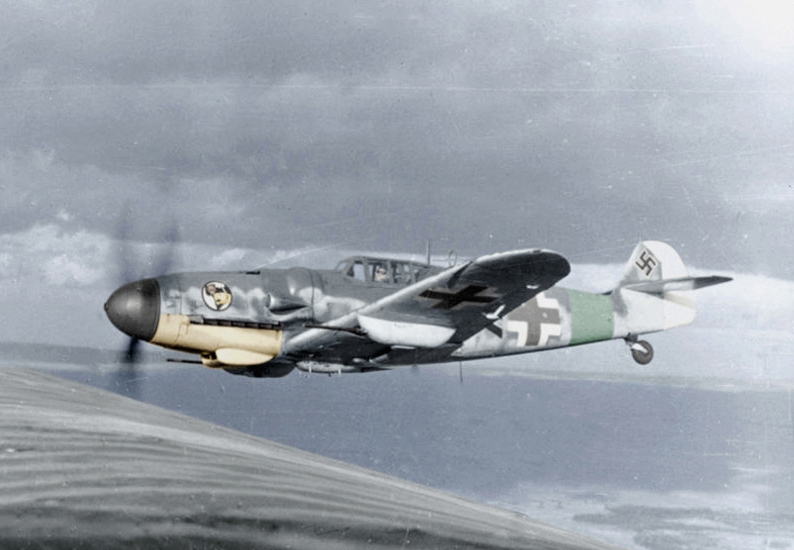
Messerschmitt Bf 109 G-6 of JG 27 (colourised photo)

The last four Venturas were met by massed anti-aircraft fire while still under attack by the Bf 109s which followed them into the FlaK. One of the German fighters overshot the Venturas and crossed in front Trent, giving him a chance to fire at it with his fixed twin .303 in (7.7 mm) nose guns. The Messerschmitt was caught by the short burst and was seen to go down in flames. Trent later said he was surprised the German pilots would pursue them through such heavy FlaK. Approaching the target at 7,000 ft (2,100 m), Trent saw his wingman shot down, followed directly by the other two aircraft. Pressing on to the target, Trent released his bombs and turned for home but as he did so his aircraft was hit again, went into a sharp spin and broke apart. Trent and his navigator, Flight Lieutenant Vivian Phillips, were thrown clear of the wreckage in mid-air and pulled their parachute ripcords but the other two crew members were unable to get free and died when the Ventura crashed into Kometon Polder; Trent and his navigator survived and were taken prisoner. Between 5:45 p.m. and 6:00 p.m. JG 1 claimed ten aircraft and Unteroffizier Max Winkler from 2./JG 27 claimed a Ventura shot down north of Amsterdam, for three II./JG 1 Fw 190s shot down and two pilots killed.

== Aftermath ==
=== Analysis ===
The 487 Squadron roll was called on 6 May and mustered only six crews and eight aircraft; it was the fourth time that a squadron had been almost annihilated in one operation. Morale in 464 Squadron, another Ventura squadron, was as severely affected as that of 487 Squadron by the losses, especially since the squadron to go on the operation had been decided by the toss of a coin.

=== Casualties ===
Of the twelve 487 Squadron Venturas sent on the mission, the only survivors were the crew of the aircraft from the first box which had turned back with a damaged escape hatch (it broke free when the Ventura landed and jammed in the rudder) and Duffill's aircraft from the second box, which was damaged beyond repair and written off; few aircrew in the nine Venturas shot down on their approach to the target survived. Some hope was offered by fighter pilots on Ramrod 16 who had reported seeing seven parachutes. The 487 Squadron diarist recorded,

It's a very bleak day with the loss of crews like Sqn. Ldr. Trent's, Flg. Off. Perryman's, Andy Coutt's, Tom Baynton's, Foster's, MacGowans, Terry Taylor, Len Richbell, Stanley Coshall, Rupert North and so many others. A better set of boys couldn't be found in thirty years. Everyone is dazed by the news.

A wounded air gunner, Flight Sergeant Urlich, was pushed out of his burning aircraft by his pilot, Flying Officer McGowan and the navigator, Flying Officer Thornber, who were killed soon afterwards, when the bomber exploded.

Urlich wrote later,

Suddenly through the intercom I heard 'fighters coming in to meet us from below'. A moment or two later I saw German fighters all round our formations. Five singled us out and began to follow. Three came behind in line astern, the first about 600 yards away. They did not attack immediately but when McGowan began to take evasive action the first one came in. He got in a burst on the port side between my turret and the pilot, but did little damage. The second one was a better shot. He broke a lot of Perspex and wounded me in the right leg. The third one really fixed us. He came in very close, raked us from end to end and hit me in the left foot. I managed to get a burst into him and down he went with his engine on fire. The intercom went dead, and we had a few peaceful moments 'till we were attacked from the front. I didn't see this one come in. He really smashed up the turret. I got nicked in the left side and one of the guns was hit by cannon shell and knocked out of its mounting.

Oberfeldwebel Ernst Heesen from 5./JG 1 and Feldwebel Willi Pfeiffer from 4./JG 1 were killed in action. Heesen had been credited with 32 aerial victories and was the leading fighter pilot in II./JG 1. Feldwebel Georg Hutter was also shot down, and made a forced landing at Haarlem, the aircraft being written off. Heesen may have been shot down by Sergeant R. J. Flight from 118 Squadron.

=== Subsequent operations ===
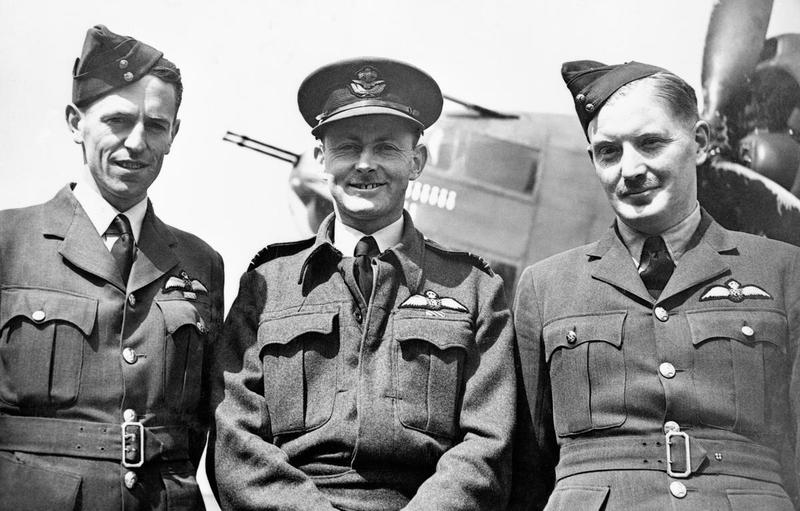
Leonard Trent (left) with his CO Wing Commander G. J. Grindell (centre) and the leader of A Flight, Squadron Leader T. Turnbull (right)

The attack on the Ijmuiden steel works by 107 Squadron was followed up by Circuses to Abbeville, Cherbourg and Poix. On 15 May, two Boston formations hit the runway and dispersals at Drucat 4 mi (6.4 km) north-east of Abbeville. En route for home, between Poix and Le Touquet, the Bostons were attacked by Bf 109s and Fw 190s. The fighters escorting the Bostons claimed two Bf 109s and Flight Sergeant Kindle, rear gunner of the squadron CO, R. G. England, claimed two fighters damaged. One Boston landed at RAF Detling with a punctured fuel tank and another came down in a field near East Peckham in Kent.

Squadron Leader Alan Wilson took command 487 Squadron which was re-built to a complement of 21 crews; on 23 May the squadron attacked coking ovens at Zeebrugge against scant opposition. On 28 May the King, George VI, came to RAF Methwold to pay his respects and meet fourteen crews from each squadron on the base. A few days later Sir Archibald Sinclair, the Secretary of State for Air, paid a visit to inspect the re-building; 464 Squadron bombed Carpiquet airfield near Caen on the same day. At the end of May, 2 Group left Bomber Command to join the new Second Tactical Air Force and came under Fighter Command control until the formation of the Allied Expeditionary Air Force, five months later. In August 487 Squadron converted to the de Havilland Mosquito; the squadron joined the new 140 Wing and went on to participate in the Amiens prison raid (Operation Jericho).

=== Leonard Trent ===
After his capture, Trent took part in the mass escape by tunnel from Stalag Luft III in Sagan, Lower Silesia in Germany, in March 1944. During the preparations for what became known as the Great Escape. Trent was one of the men responsible for disposal of sand taken from the tunnel; Trent also acted as a security officer to prevent the Germans learning of what was afoot. During the escape, Trent passed through the tunnel and emerged from the hole outside the camp wire when a patrolling sentry discovered the men waiting to crawl away into the woods and alerted the camp guards. After being repatriated and returning to 487 Squadron, Trent reported,

As we approached Amsterdam the anti-aircraft guns joined the fighters in a race to see who would get us first. I was surprised that the fighters continued their attacks and as the powerhouse came into sight my observer had to direct me. 'Bombs Gone' he called, and I looked up from the instruments to see that we were alone. At the same moment we were hit and I found that all controls had gone, but no fire and engines going perfectly. This continued for ten seconds or so, which seemed an age, and then suddenly the aircraft reared up, stalled upside down and went into a spin. Had ordered 'Abandon aircraft' before the zoom and now tried to get out from the roof hatch myself. However, the spin was so rapid that I was not getting anywhere until at about 7,000 feet the machine suddenly broke up and I found myself outside. My navigator was also thrown out but unfortunately the others were trapped in a portion of the wreckage.

=== Awards ===
For their actions on Ramrod 16, Trent was awarded a Victoria Cross at an investiture at Buckingham Palace on 12 April 1946 and Phillips was decorated with the Distinguished Service Order (DSO). Following the war Trent spent a short amount of time in the New Zealand Air Force before returning to the RAF, where he completed his career in military aviation, reaching the rank of Group Captain.

== Order of battle ==
=== 487 Squadron ===
- AJ209 V; Squadron Leader L. H. Trent's aircraft, crashed into Kominten Polder near Fokker Works, 6:00 p.m. two killed, two taken prisoner (PoW)
- AE916 C; aircraft returned damaged, landed RAF Feltwell at 6:55 p.m.
- AE731 O; emergency landing between Haarlem and Vijfhuizen 5:45 p.m. three crew killed, one PoW
- AE684 B; shot down over Bennebroek 5:45 p.m., one killed, three POW
- AJ200 G; shot down at Vijfhuizen, no survivors
- AE780 S; shot down at Bornstrasse, Amsterdam; three killed, one PoW
- AE716 U; crashed in polder west of Amsterdam 6:00 p.m. no survivors
- AE713 T; crashed at Hernbrug 5:53 p.m., no survivors
- AJ478 A; ditched 12 mi (20 km) off Dutch coast, one killed, three PoW
- AE956 H; lost at sea, no survivors
- AE798 D; lost at sea, no survivors
- Q Queenie; turned back, crew survived

=== 107 Squadron ===
- Boston IIIA × 6

=== Rodeo 212 ===
- Thirteen 11 Group fighter squadrons flying a diversion to Vlissingen (Flushing) on the island of Walcheren, 78 mi (126 km) to the south-west of Amsterdam.

=== Target Support ===
- 122 Squadron (5 × Spitfire Mk IX)
- No. 453 Squadron RAAF (11 × Spitfire Mk IX)

=== Close escort ===
- 118 Squadron (12 × Spitfire Mk V)
- 167 Squadron (8 × Spitfire Mk Vb, 4 × Spitfire Vc)
- 504 (County of Nottingham) Squadron (3 × Spitfire Mk Vb, 9 × Spitfire MkVc)

=== Rear cover ===
- 302 (Polish) Squadron (7 × Spitfire Mk V)
- 306 (Polish) Squadron (12 × Spitfire Mk V)
- 308 (Polish) Squadron (11 × Spitfire Mk V)
- 613 (City of Manchester) Squadron (8 × Mustang Mk I)

== See also ==
- Circus offensive
- Operation Oyster
- Operation Jericho

== Bibliography ==
- Bailey, Gavin J. (2013). Arsenal of Democracy: Aircraft Supply and the Evolution of the Anglo-American Alliance, 1938–1942. Edinburgh: Edinburgh University Press. ISBN 978-0-7486-4975-4.
- Baughen, G. (2016). The RAF in the Battle of France and the Battle of Britain: A Reappraisal of Army and Air Policy 1938–1940. Stroud: Fonthill Media. ISBN 978-1-78155-525-5.
- Baughen, G. (2017). The Fairey Battle: A Reassessment of its RAF Career. Stroud: Fonthill Media. ISBN 978-1-78155-585-9.
- Baughen, G. (2018). RAF on the Offensive: The Rebirth of Tactical Air Power 1940–1941. Stroud: Fonthill Media. ISBN 978-1-52673-515-7.
- Boog, H.; Rahn, W.; Stumpf, R.; Wegner, B. (2001). Osers, E. (ed.). The Global War: Widening of the Conflict into a World War and the Shift of the Initiative 1941–1943. Germany and the Second World War. Vol. VI. Translated by Osers, E.; Brownjohn, J.; Crampton, P.; Willmott, L. (Eng. trans. Clarendon Press, Oxford ed.). Potsdam: Militärgeschichtliches Forschungsamt (Research Institute for Military History). ISBN 0-19-822888-0.
  - Boog, H. "Part IV. The Anglo-American Strategic Air War over Europe and German Air Defence". In Boog et al. (2001).
- Bowman, M. W. (2005). The Reich Intruders: RAF Light Bomber Raids in World War II (1st ed.). Barnsley: Pen & Sword Aviation. ISBN 1-84415-333-9.
- Bowyer, M. J. F. (1979) [1974]. 2 Group RAF: A Complete History 1936–1945 (2nd Faber Paperbacks ed.). London: Faber and Faber. ISBN 0-571-11460-1.
- Caldwell, Donald L.; Muller, Richard R. (2007). The Luftwaffe over Germany: Defense of the Reich. London: Greenhill. ISBN 978-1-85367-712-0.
- Carter, I. (2002). Fighter Command 1939–45. Hersham: Ian Allan. ISBN 0-7110-2842-7.
- Herington, John (1954). Air War Against Germany and Italy, 1939–1943. Australia in the War of 1939–1945, 3 Air. Vol. III (1st ed.). Canberra, Australian Capital Territory: Australian War Memorial. OCLC 3633363.
- Hinsley, F. H. (1994) [1993]. British Intelligence in the Second World War. Its influence on Strategy and Operations (abridged). History of the Second World War (2nd rev. pbk. ed.). London: HMSO. ISBN 978-0-11-630961-7.
- Holmes, Robin (2010). The Battle of the Heligoland Bight, 1939: The Royal Air Force and the Luftwaffe's Baptism of Fire. London: Grub Street. ISBN 978-1-906502-56-0.
- Jackson, R. (1974). Air War over France 1939–40 (1st ed.). London: Ian Allan. ISBN 978-0-7110-0510-5.
- Mathews, Andrew Johannes; Foreman, John (2015). Luftwaffe Aces: Biographies and Victory Claims, G–L. Vol. II. Walton on Thames: Red Kite. ISBN 978-1-906592-19-6.
- Murray, Williamson (1989) [1983]. Strategy for Defeat: The Luftwaffe, 1933–1945. Maxwell Air Force Base, Al: Air University Press. ISBN 978-0-933852-45-7.
- O'Toole, Tony; Derry, Martin; Robinson, Neil (2014). Hawker Hurricane and Sea Hurricane. Barnsley, South Yorkshire: Pen & Sword Books. ISBN 978-147385-101-6.
- Prien, Jochen; Rodeike, Peter (1993). Jagdgeschwader 1 und 11—Einsatz in der Reichsverteidigung von 1939 bis 1945, Teil 1: 1939–1943 [Jagdgeschwader 1 and 11 Operations in the Defense of the Reich from 1939 to 1945: 1939–1943] (in German). Vol. I. Eutin: Struve-Druck. ISBN 978-3-923457-21-2.
- Prien, Jochen; Rodeike, Peter; Stemmer, Gerhard (1998). Messerschmitt Bf 109 im Einsatz bei Stab und I./Jagdgeschwader 27 1939–1945 [Messerschmitt Bf 109 in Action with the Headquarters Unit and I./Jagdgeschwader 27 in 1939–1945] (in German). Eutin: Struve-Druck. ISBN 978-3-923457-46-5.
- Richards, Denis (1974) [1953]. Royal Air Force 1939–1945: The Fight At Odds. History of the Second World War. Vol. I (pbk. repr. ed.). London: HMSO. ISBN 978-0-11-771592-9 – via Hyperwar Foundation.
- Shores, C.; Thomas, C. (2004). 2nd Tactical Air Force: Spartan to Normandy June 1943 to June 1944. Vol. I. Hersham: Classic Publications (Ian Allan). ISBN 1-903223-40-7.
- Thompson, H. L. (1956). "Chapter 6 Daylight Raids by the Light Bombers". New Zealanders with the Royal Air Force. The Official History of New Zealand in the Second World War 1939–1945. Vol. II (online ed.). Wellington, New Zealand: Historical Publications Branch. pp. 143–148. OCLC 846897274 – via New Zealand Electronic Text Collection.
- "Trent Leonard". Aircrew Remembered. 2019.
- "True to the End". Pacific Wings Magazine. Christchurch, NZ: New Zealand Wings. January 2001. ISSN 1174-8052.
