= Defence School of Electronic and Mechanical Engineering =

Coordinates: 50°48′58.58″N 1°12′37.54″W

- Active: 1 April 2004 – present
- Country: United Kingdom
- Branch: British Army; Royal Air Force
- Type: Defence Training Establishment
- Role: electronic and mechanical engineering training
- Part of: Defence College of Technical Training
- Locations: MOD Lyneham (HQ)

The Defence School of Electronic and Mechanical Engineering (DSEME) is one of four Defence Schools within the Defence College of Technical Training (DCTT) of the British Ministry of Defence. It was formed on 1 Apr 2010 and comprises a Headquarters, the British Army's 8 Training Battalion of the Royal Electrical and Mechanical Engineers (REME), and the REME Arms School all based at MOD Lyneham, and the Royal Air Force's No. 4 School of Technical Training (No. 4 SoTT) also at MOD Lyneham from 2024.

== History ==
The School originated from the Defence College of Electro-Mechanical Engineering (DCEME) formed on 1 April 2004 as one of five Defence Training Establishments (DTE) introduced to deliver coherent and cost effective training across the United Kingdom Ministry of Defence. DCEME brought together a number of separate Service training organizations, all of which were delivering forms of electro-mechanical engineering, with the aim of exploiting synergies to improve training delivery and output, and increase efficiency and effectiveness.

=== Defence Training Rationalisation Programme ===
The Defence Training Rationalisation Programme saw plans being made to collocate DCEME, the Defence College of Aeronautical Engineering and the Defence College of Communications and Information Systems at MOD St Athan in 2014, as part of a commercial partnership with Metrix UK. The termination of the programme was announced in 19 October 2010 with the MOD stating that Metrix cannot deliver an affordable, commercially-robust proposal within the prescribed period. Training in the meantime remained at existing locations.

=== Defence Technical Training Change Programme ===
As part of the Defence Technical Training Change Programme, part of the wider Defence Training Review, the MOD announced on 18 July 2011 that the Defence College of Technical Training (DCTT) would relocate to MOD Lyneham in Wiltshire. Plans called for the relocation of various British Army, Royal Navy and RAF training facilities to Lyneham, with the aim of modernising technical training and achieving efficiencies. Initially it was planned that the following training functions would relocate to Lyneham.

- Electronic and Mechanical Engineering – training for vehicle mechanics, recovery mechanics, armourers, metalsmiths, control equipment technicians and technical support specialists, and the Royal Navy's marines engineers. As a result of the move to MOD Lyneham, the Army's Royal Electrical and Mechanical Engineers (REME) technical training establishments at Arborfield Garrison in Berkshire and Bordon Camp in Hampshire, would both close. No. 4 School of Technical Training based at RAF St. Athan in Vale of Glamorgan and the Defence School of Marine Engineering at HMS Sultan, Gosport in Hampshire, would also relocate.
- Aeronautical Engineering – training for avionics and aircraft technicians. Delivery of Army training would relocate from Arborfield Garrison, RAF training at No. 1 School of Technical Training and the Aeronautical Engineering & Management Training School at RAF Cosford in Shropshire and the Royal Naval Air Engineering & Survival Equipment School at HMS Sultan.
- Communications and Information Systems – field based tactical training and classroom/workshop based technical training, relocating from the Royal School of Signals at Blandford Camp in Dorset and No. 1 Radio School at RAF Cosford.

In 2012, DCEME joined three other technical training colleges under a combined organisation, the Defence College of Technical Training (DCTT), and reverted in title to being a Defence School.

Michael Fallon, Secretary of State for Defence, announced in September 2015 that the relocation of the RAF and Royal Navy training elements to Lyneham would no longer take place. A re-evaluation of the programme determined that the consolidation onto a single site was no longer the best option. The first phase, the relocation of the REME schools from Aborfield and Bordon would still proceed.

REME training at Arborfield and Bordon transferred to Lyneham in September 2015, and was due to begin at Lyneham by November of that year. The School of Army Aeronautical Engineering (SAAE), also moved from Aborfield, to commence training in October 2015, operating under the Defence School of Aeronautical Engineering.

In 2023 No 4 School relocated to MOD Lyneham to enable greater collaboration and sharing of facilities across the two services.

== Constituent elements ==
The school comprises several affiliated schools.

=== Headquarters ===
The DSEME headquarters is based at MOD Lyneham in Wiltshire. The School reports to the Defence College of Technical Training (DCTT) which, in turn, is part of the Royal Air Force's No. 22 Group.

=== 8 Training Battalion REME ===
8 Training Battalion of the British Army's Royal Electrical and Mechanical Engineers (REME) is based at MOD Lyneham. The battalion trains Army and Royal Marines armourers, vehicle mechanics, electronic technicians, recovery mechanics, technical support specialist (technical store-man), metalsmiths and REME vehicle, electronic and weapons artificers. It was formerly known as the School of Electrical and Mechanical Engineering (SEME) and was based at Bordon Camp in Hampshire before moving to Lyneham in 2016.

=== REME Arms School ===
The Royal Electrical and Mechanical Engineers Arms School is based at MOD Lyneham. It provides engineering command and leadership courses to REME soldiers and officers as well as health and safety, quality management, European Foundation Quality Management (EFQM) and specialist equipment support courses. The school was previously based at Arborfield in Berkshire.

=== No. 4 School of Technical Training ===
No. 4 School of Technical Training is based at MOD Lyneham and provides initial trade training to RAF personnel and subsequent professional trade training across its ground engineering disciplines. It was established in 1938 at RAF St Athan before moving to Lyneham in 2024.
