= Blandford Camp =

Military base in southern England

- Near Blandford Forum, Dorset in England
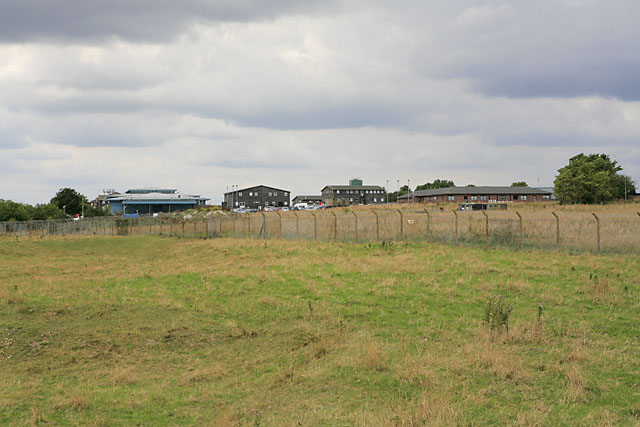
- Part of Blandford Camp seen from a nearby tumulus

Site information
- Type: Army base
- Owner: Ministry of Defence
- Operator: British Army
- Controlled by: Royal Signals

Location
- Shown within Dorset
- Coordinates: 50°52′N 2°07′W

Site history
- Built: 1724
- In use: 1724-present

Blandford Camp is a military base comprising some 390 hectares of downland lying 2 miles (3 km) north-east of Blandford Forum in the county of Dorset in southern England.

Significant areas of the camp are Sites of Special Scientific Interest (SSSI).

Blandford Camp is currently the home of the Royal Signals, housing both the headquarters of the corps as well as the headquarters of the Defence College of Communications and Information Systems (DCCIS), the Royal School of Signals (which includes 11 Signal Regiment), the Royal Signals Museum and the HQ Station (G4RS) of the Royal Signals Amateur Radio Society. A number of other telecommunications-related units, such as the MOD Land Systems Reference Centre, are also housed on the site. Over the years, however, the camp has been home to Royal Navy, Royal Air Force, Army and joint-Service units, as well as to a US Army hospital complex. The site has also been used as a road racing circuit.

== History ==
There are numerous prehistoric sites within the camp boundaries, but the first recorded use of the site was as a racecourse, giving rise to the naming of part of the area as Race Down. Race meetings began in the late 16th century and an annual race week was held until the end of the 19th century.

=== 18th century ===
It is thought that the area has been used by military forces for many centuries but the first definite use of the site was in the 18th century when local volunteer units used it as a training ground. In addition, in 1724 a troop of the Hussars were stationed in the area for anti-smuggling duties.

During 1756, to counter the threat of a French invasion along the south coast during the Seven Years' War, an army of some 10,000 men was formed near Blandford, at Shroton, with major exercises being held on Blandford Downs, on the site of the present-day camp.

=== 19th century ===
In 1806, an Admiralty Shutter Telegraph Station was built near the racecourse on the site now known as Telegraph Clump. The Blandford station was a link in the chain used to convey messages from the Admiralty in London to the Naval Dockyard at Plymouth. The signal station was closed in 1816 after the end of the Napoleonic Wars, but was retained on a care and maintenance basis until 1825.

Blandford Race Down continued to be used during the 19th century as a training ground for the Yeomanry and Volunteer units of Dorsetshire and a permanent rifle range was constructed in the area of what is now Racedown Road.

=== First World War - Royal Naval Division ===
With the outbreak of the First World War a large number of Royal Naval reservists were called for full-time service, in excess of the numbers required to man ships. It was therefore decided that a Royal Naval Division would be formed to augment the army divisions. After its initial action in the front line in Belgium, the Division returned to the UK and established a base depot and training camp at Blandford. A German prisoner of war camp was also set up alongside it.

The RN Division had battalions named after the former naval officers Drake, Nelson, Benbow, Hawke, Hood, Howe, Anson and Collingwood, and the various encampments at Blandford took these names. Instruction on trench construction and trench warfare was carried out within the camp area and traces of the Royal Naval Division trenches can still be seen in the area beyond Drake East Lines.

The men of the Division left Blandford Camp to embark on the ill-fated Gallipoli operation. A memorial now stands at Collingwood Corner, on the main A354 Blandford Forum to Salisbury road, dedicated to the men of the Collingwood Battalion who lost their lives in the Third Battle of Krithia at Gallipoli on 4 June 1915.

=== Royal Flying Corps/Royal Air Force ===
During 1918, the camp changed from being the depot for the Royal Naval Division to being an 'Intake Camp' for the Royal Flying Corps which was at that time being reformed as the Royal Air Force, and a branch railway line was built to bring materials and personnel to the camp. The railway was linked with the Somerset and Dorset Joint Railway line immediately south of Blandford Forum railway station and there was a daily passenger service to bring civilian staff to the camp from Bournemouth and the villages in between. Because of the significant gradient of the line (a rise of about 180 feet over three miles), heavier trains required tank engines (and occasionally banking engines) to negotiate the steep ascent up to the camp. At the end of 1919, however, the camp was closed and both the wooden huts built for the RN Division and the camp's railway line were removed. By the end of 1920 the site had been returned to agricultural use.

=== Second World War ===
With the buildup of tension leading up to the Second World War, the camp was reactivated in 1939 as a mobilization and training centre for reservists, with a new wooden hutted camp being built on the sites of the RN Division encampments. There are still a few huts from the 1939 camp remaining, these being in Drake East Lines and in the Benbow Lines.

After the fall of France the British Army went through a period of reorganisation, and anti-aircraft units of the Royal Artillery trained on the site, as well as a reconnaissance battalion of the Royal Northumberland Fusiliers. The camp then became a Battle Training Camp, staffed by a cadre of officers and non-commissioned officers who organised the training of the units who passed through the camp. Each unit spent a month carrying out intensive training prior to being sent to a combat area such as North Africa, or preparing for the planned invasion of Normandy in 1944.

=== US Army hospital complex ===
Since, once the invasion of Europe was underway, Blandford Camp would no longer be required as a training camp, it was decided to convert the camp into a US Army hospital complex and, in April 1944, the first of five US Army general hospitals was established. The hospitals started receiving patients about two weeks after D-Day and many were brought from the combat area via the wartime airfield at Tarrant Rushton. The hospitals were often working at full capacity and receiving as many as 500 casualties during one night. The hospital complex closed after VE Day and the majority of the staff returned to the USA during October 1945.

The Roosevelt Garden and Memorial were dedicated on 30 May 1945 in the camp, and a memorial service is held there annually in November in remembrance of those who died.

=== Post-war years ===
After the closure of the hospitals the camp was reconverted to a training camp, and from 1946 until 1962 it was used by the Royal Army Service Corps (as a National Service driver training camp), the Royal Electrical and Mechanical Engineers, the Army Catering Corps and the Army Physical Training Corps.

=== Blandford Motor Racing Circuit ===
Blandford circuit
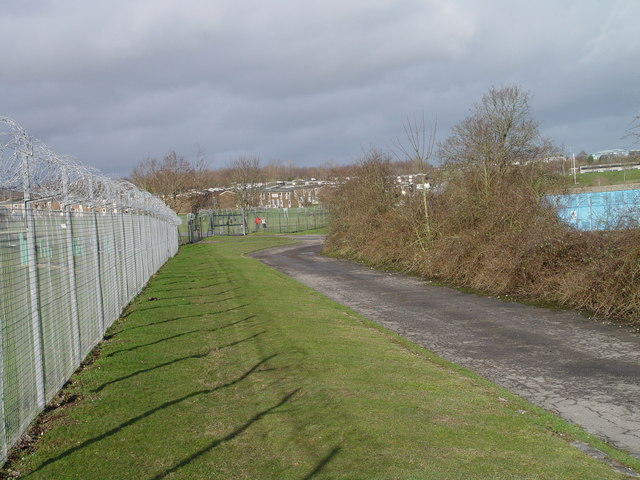
- A view just outside the circuit, which crosses from the blue fence on the right beyond the hedge and through where the gate now stands in the centre. This point on the track was called "The Dip".
- Location: Dorset, England
- Opened: 25 July 1948
- Closed: December 1960
- Major events: Formula Two; Road Racing; Motorcycle Racing
- Length: 5.05 km (3.14 mi)
- Turns: 6

On 25 July 1948, the 3 miles 247.1875 yards (5.05 km) perimeter road around the camp was used to form the UK's first post-war road racing circuit. Around 10,000 spectators attended the first event, a motorcycle race, and the lap record was set by Bob Foster at just over 85 mph (137 km/h).

By the time of the third event in April 1949, the circuit had obtained a reputation as the fastest in the country, with speeds over 110 mph (177 km/h) being achieved down the straights. and sidecars were raced at the circuit for the first time at the fourth motorcycle meeting in August.

The Hants and Dorset Car Club organised a successful kilometre speed hill climb over part of the course in May 1949, and shortly afterwards the circuit was approved by the R.A.C. for car events. The eight race National Meeting, was held on 27 August, and although the meeting was judged a success, it was blighted by three serious accidents, one of them fatal. The most remarkable of the three however, was to Major Peter Braid in the 500cc race. Hitting a bus shelter demolished in the previous accident, his car was launched, landing on the roof of an army building, where it remained until the end of the day's racing. At the inquest shortly afterwards, the coroner expressed surprise that the wearing of crash helmets was not obligatory, and a doctor who attended the victim also stated that "a crash helmet might have saved his life".

Accidents again marred Blackmoor Vale motorcycle club's end of the season meeting the following weekend on 3 September, with one rider dying after a multiple pile-up in the final race, and two other riders succumbing to their injuries shortly afterwards. Seven other riders were seriously injured in the final race incident, all of whom took avoiding action when second-placed rider David Gregory fell at Monkton Corner, hitting a fence and being killed instantly.

The serious accidents were generally attributed to competitors lack of racing experience, and complaints about the circuit at this time were more often related to delays and accessibility issues attached to running public events on an active military base. Some local opposition to the track however, was becoming more vocal.

The next motorcycle event at the track, was billed as the Auto-Cycle Union's "first international road race meeting on the British mainland". Over 40,000 spectators attended, and the event on 29 April 1950 saw the debut of the latest version of the "works" AJS Porcupine as well as the first appearance of the Norton featherbed frame. The international nature of the event was somewhat diminished by a clash of dates with other meetings on the continent, and the only non-British competitors were two Belgians. However, top riders like Geoff Duke and Bob Foster did take part, and Duke raised the lap record to just under 89 mph (143 km/h). Again, the event saw fatalities, with two riders killed on the very fast Engineer's Corner.

At the inquest following this event, the coroner was unequivocal.

I hope that those who have got the power to ban these races, and it appears to be the military authority, will not give their consent again.

Criticism was levelled at the lack of protection for riders from saplings attached to iron spikes, other metal stakes and telegraph poles present at various points around the track. Although it was unclear if any of these hazards had been a factor in any of the fatalities, the coroner was critical of the fact that "improvements" to the circuit had not even looked at any of these. After the second crash at Engineer's Corner, straw bales had been put in place, but this was entirely on the initiative of an army sergeant-major on duty at the event, rather than the organisers. Despite these issues, the jury accepted that the riders took part knowing the risks involved and verdicts of accidental death were returned in both cases.

Now required to wear helmets, two further car meetings passed without incident, but on 29 July, practising for the eleventh speed hill climb on the course, the well-liked and much respected driver Joe Fry was killed when his car hit a bank and somersaulted several times. The inquest, held by the same coroner as the one in May, was damning. Despite being highlighted at the previous inquest, and a witness having come forward subsequently stating that a metal stake had been the cause of the death of one of the riders previously, nothing at the circuit had been changed and Fry's car had hit one of the metal stakes when it crashed. The coroner felt that there had been "gross negligence" and further stated that "Blandford racing is going to end." Shortly afterwards, the army's Southern Command Headquarters issued a statement to confirm that "no further permission will be granted for car or motorcycle meetings".

One final motorcycle event, already organised for August Bank holiday Monday was allowed to continue. Fortunately, the event passed without serious incident, and Geoff Duke, who won three of the races that day, also raised the official lap record to 91.03 mph (146 km/h).

A month later, the local MP Robert Crouch met with representatives of the Blandford Chamber of Trade. The motorcycle racing promoters had received hundreds of letters from the public asking them to protest the closure and, despite the fatal accidents, some of the country's leading riders had also written to state it was the finest and safest road racing track in the country. The executive of the Board of Trade were also very much in favour of lifting the ban, stating the treasury had benefitted by over £3,650 in the two years 1948-49 and that Army Regimental funds had also received a substantial amount. Following the meeting, the MP agreed to meet with John Strachey, the Secretary of State for War, to discuss the ban being lifted. The local road safety committee also met to discuss the ban, and though any action was deferred, shortly afterwards the camp commandant offered the use of the circuit "for courses of instruction for learner motorcyclists".

In December, the War Office announced that the ban would be lifted for a trial period of six months. Unfortunately, on 14 May 1951, at the first meeting when racing resumed, another serious accident took place when two riders collided at Cuckoo Corner at high speed. Although the two riders only suffered minor injuries, one of the motorcycles hit a soldier and a Red Cross attendant who were at trackside, and the attendant died of his injuries shortly afterwards.

Following this accident, a tight chicane was added at Engineer's Corner, which considerably reduced speeds and motorcycling events continued at the track until the circuit was closed due to expansion of the army camp in 1961.

=== Royal Signals ===
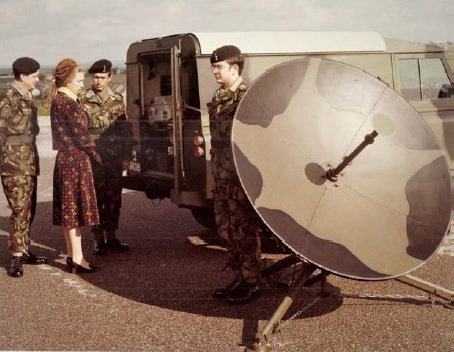
A Land Rover based VSC 501 military satellite terminal being shown to Princess Anne at Blandford Camp by 30 Signal Regiment

In 1960, 30 Signal Regiment moved into the camp from Middle Wallop. Blandford was then selected to be the future home of the School of Signals (then at Catterick) and the present-day camp was planned. The School of Signals (now the Royal School of Signals) moved there in 1967, to be responsible for all management and technical courses for Royal Signals Officers and NCOs.

In the early 1990s, under the Government's 'Options for Change' initiatives, 30 Signal Regiment moved to Bramcote to make way in 1995 for Royal Signals soldier training to be moved from Catterick Camp. The Headquarters of the Corps also came to the site from London. All special-to-arm training is now carried out with 11 Signal Regiment at Blandford.

Following the UK Government's 2001 Defence Training Review (DTR), the Ministry of Defence proposed handing over armed forces skills training to a private sector bidder for a 25-year term, and it was announced on 17 January 2007 that the Metrix consortium had been awarded Preferred Bidder status for Package 1 of this programme. As a consequence, it was anticipated that all communications training would move from Blandford to Metrix's main campus to be built on the RAF St Athan site over a 5-year period from 2008. The announcement did however stress that there are no current plans to close or sell off the Blandford site, and that it is anticipated that it will continue to have a Defence use.

== Current units ==
Below is a list of the units and formations based at Blandford:

Ministry of Defence

- Defence College of Communications and Information Systems (HQ), at Harrogate Building
- Craddock Training Area

Strategic Command

- Specialist Group Information Services, at Rutherford Building

British Army

- Headquarters, Royal Corps of Signals, at Griffin House
- 11th (Royal School of Signals) Signal Regiment, Royal Corps of Signals
  - Regimental Headquarters
  - 2 (Catterick) Squadron
  - 3 (Harrogate) Squadron
  - 4 (Military Training) Squadron
  - 5 (Maresfield) Squadron
- 13th Signal Regiment
  - Regimental Headquarters
  - 224 (Cyber Protection Team) Signal Squadron
  - 259 (Global Information Services) Signal Squadron – Joint services
  - Communication Information Systems (CIS) Trails and Development Unit (CISTDU)
- 280 (United Kingdom) Signal Squadron, Royal Corps of Signals
- Blandford Garrison Support Unit, Royal Corps of Signals
- Royal Corps of Signals Training Development Team

== Notable connections ==
- Sub Lieutenant Rupert Brooke (1887–1915), stationed at Blandford between November 1914 and February 1915. It is thought that some of his best known sonnets were written here.
- Joe Fry (1915–1950), British racing car driver. He was killed in an accident at the 1950 Blandford hill-climb.
