= Locking, Somerset =

Village in Somerset, England

Coordinates: 51.3309°N 2.9108°W

Locking
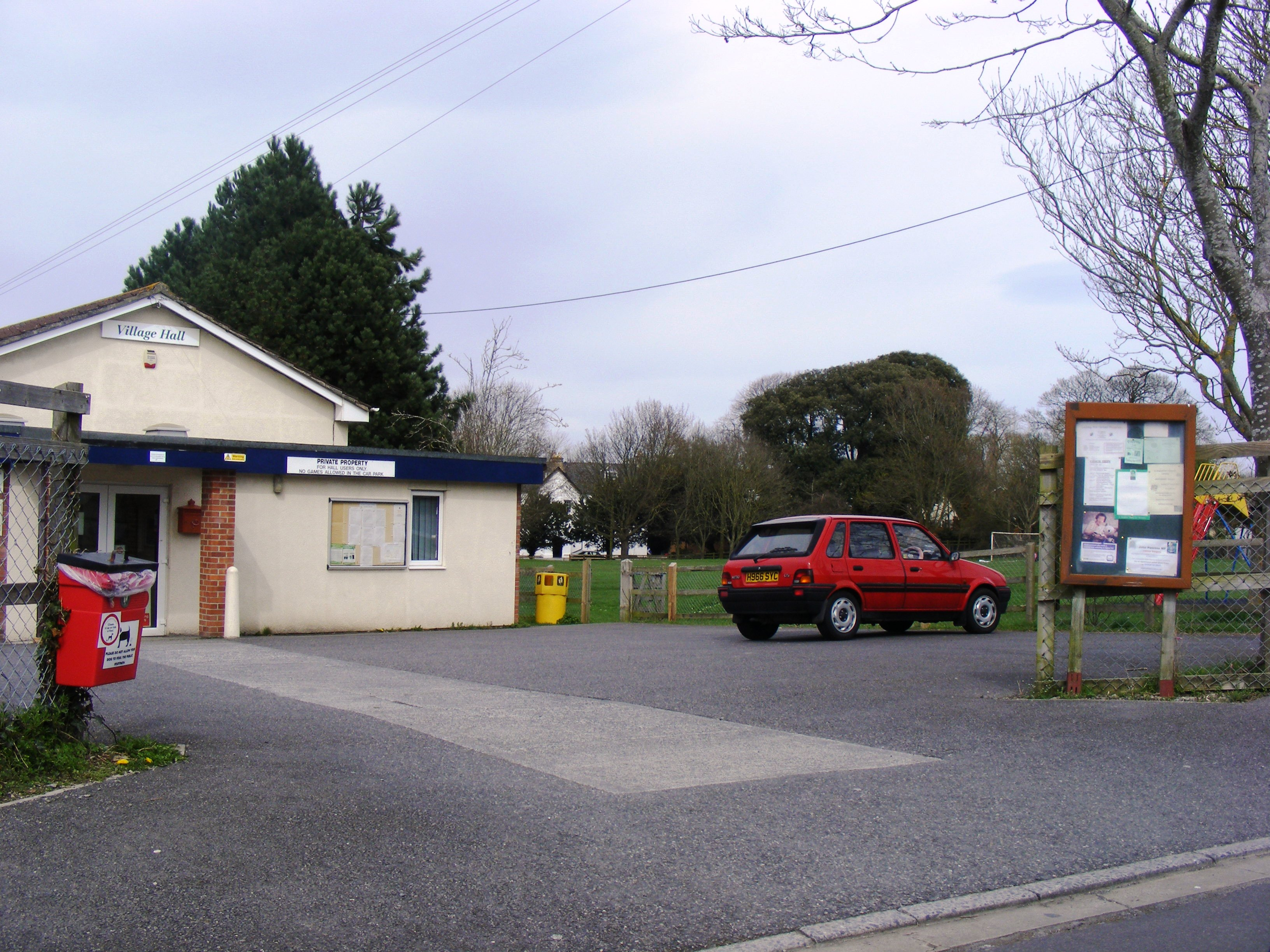
- Locking village hall

- Location within Somerset
- Population: 2,756 (2011)
- OS grid reference: ST365595
- Unitary authority: North Somerset
- Ceremonial county: Somerset
- Region: South West
- Country: England
- Sovereign state: United Kingdom
- Post town: WESTON-SUPER-MARE
- Postcode district: BS24
- Dialling code: 01934
- Police: Avon and Somerset
- Fire: Avon
- Ambulance: South Western
- UK Parliament: Weston-super-Mare

Locking is a village and civil parish in Somerset, England. It is a predominantly quiet residential area of North Somerset, 3.5 miles (5.6 km) south east of the town of Weston-super-Mare.

As well as a pub and church the village has a village hall, school (Locking Primary School), a small shop and post office, a hairdressers, a Chinese takeaway, a pet care shop, florist, pharmacy, cafe and petrol service station comprising car sales and a mechanical workshop.

The village gave its name to RAF Locking, which has now closed and proposals are under consideration for an employment and residential development for the site that could deliver 25 hectare (62 acres) of employment space and up to 1,800 new homes. In July 2011, North Somerset Council gave planning permission for the £50 million LeisureDome to be constructed on the site. It will contain a 210-metre (690 ft) indoor ski slope, other leisure facilities and a number of shops and restaurants.

== History ==
The village of Locking is small but has a long history. There is evidence of Roman settlements nearby. The name "Locking" has a Saxon derivation probably meaning "Locc's people" and it was in the Saxon period that the church and village grew. The parish was part of the Winterstoke Hundred.

John Plumley, who at the time was Lord of the Manor, had been a supporter of the Duke of Monmouth and participated in the Battle of Sedgmoor. Following the rout of Monmouth's forces, Plumley returned to Locking, and when the King's men came looking for him, he was given away by his dog whose barking alerted them to Plumley hiding in a nearby tree. The manor was subsequently acquired by Edward Colston of Bristol. In 1708 he endowed the manor to free school (now Collegiate School) he established in his home city.

East of the village, close to RAF Locking is the site of Locking Castle a motte and bailey castle on Carberry Hill. It has been designated as a Scheduled Ancient Monument.

== Governance ==
The parish council has responsibility for local issues, including setting an annual precept (local rate) to cover the council's operating costs and producing annual accounts for public scrutiny. The parish council evaluates local planning applications and works with the local police, district council officers, and neighbourhood watch groups on matters of crime, security, and traffic. The parish council's role also includes initiating projects for the maintenance and repair of parish facilities, such as the village hall or community centre, playing fields and playgrounds, as well as consulting with the district council on the maintenance, repair, and improvement of highways, drainage, footpaths, public transport, and street cleaning. Conservation matters (including trees and listed buildings) and environmental issues are also of interest to the council.

The parish falls within the unitary authority of North Somerset which was created in 1996, as established by the Local Government Act 1992. It provides a single tier of local government with responsibility for almost all local government functions within their area including local planning and building control, local roads, council housing, environmental health, markets and fairs, refuse collection, recycling, cemeteries, crematoria, leisure services, parks, and tourism. They are also responsible for education, social services, libraries, main roads, public transport, trading standards, waste disposal and strategic planning, although fire, police and ambulance services are provided jointly with other authorities through the Avon Fire and Rescue Service, Avon and Somerset Constabulary and the South Western Ambulance Service.

North Somerset's area covers part of the ceremonial county of Somerset but it is administered independently of the non-metropolitan county. Its administrative headquarters are in the town hall in Weston-super-Mare. Between 1 April 1974 and 1 April 1996, it was the Woodspring district of the county of Avon. Before 1974 that the parish was part of the Axbridge Rural District.

The parish is represented in the House of Commons of the Parliament of the United Kingdom as part of the Weston-super-Mare county constituency. It elects one Member of Parliament (MP) by the first past the post system of election. It was also part of the South West England constituency of the European Parliament prior to Britain leaving the European Union in January 2020, which elected seven MEPs using the d'Hondt method of party-list proportional representation.

== Locking Park FC ==
Locking Park FC was formed in 1993 on the back of a number of local youth players coming of age and with the support of local resources. Historically football in Locking goes back to the 1950s where RAF Locking had a number of teams and achieved great success. In 2016 Dynamo Locking merged with Locking Park FC to become the club's reserve side.

Locking Park FC currently play in Division 1 (first) and Division 3 (reserve) of the Weston-Super-Mare and District Football League and can be seen playing football every Saturday during the football season at the "Top Pitch" football arena situated in the village on Old Banwell Road.

== Pub ==
Locking is home to the Coach House Inn pub which sponsors Locking Park FC is the hub of activity for local residents and as well as football it supports competitive teams for darts, skittles, cricket and pool.

== The Lockerz ==
Locking is also the birthplace of The Lockerz, a band formed by past and present Locking Park FC footballers. After appearing on Dutch TV and BBC's The One Show, The Lockerz released an unofficial England Euro 2016 anthem "Bring It Home".

== Church ==
The Parish Church of St Augustine dates from the late 14th century and is a Grade II* listed building. It stands on a hill above a valley by the Mendip Hills and has views towards the nearby coast. There has been a church since around AD 1230.

St Augustine's church in Locking was founded around AD 1230 by the monks of Woodspring Priory. The oldest part of the church visible today is the tower, which was built in 1380. The font has carvings characteristic of Celtic art from the 11th century, and the figures at the corners are dressed in armour of the style of Richard I (1189–1199).
