= Defence Aviation Repair Agency =

Former executive agency in the UK

The Defence Aviation Repair Agency, better known as DARA, was an executive agency of the United Kingdom Ministry of Defence, responsible for the maintenance and repair of Royal Air Force, Army and the Royal Navy's aircraft. It became part of the Defence Support Group from 1 April 2008. Part of the Defence Support Group (DSG) was sold to Babcock on 31 March 2015 while the remainder became the Defence Electronics and Components Agency (DECA) on 1 April 2015.

DARA, which had four sites across the UK, was the biggest government-owned aerospace repair facility in Europe. Since a distinct U-turn in MOD policy from centralised repair expertise to diversified line repair, DARA's operations were either scheduled to be closed or under review, with an intended strategy to privatise the various remaining divisions.

== Background ==
Launched on 1 April 1999, post the government's Strategic Defence Review, DARA brought together the RAF Maintenance Group Defence Agency (MGDA) and the Naval Aircraft Repair Organisation (NARO). DARA offered the capability to completely strip, replace, repair and rebuild aircraft from systems, components and equipment to whole aircraft, for both military and commercial organisations.

DARA was established as a Trading Fund on 1 April 2001.

== Operations ==
DARA had centres of excellence across Fixed Wing, Rotary and Engines, Electronics and Components. Its chief executive was Archie Hughes:

=== Locations ===
- DARA Head Office - RAF St Athan, near Cardiff
- DARA Engines - Gosport, Hampshire - business closed March 2007
- DARA Fast Jets - RAF St Athan - business closed March 2007
- DARA Large Aircraft - at RAF St Athan is the UK centre for deep maintenance of the Vickers VC10 transport and refuelling aircraft, working as the MRO subcontractor to BAE Systems.
- DARA Rotary - Fleetlands, Gosport, Hampshire: the UK's centre of depth maintenance for Chinook, Lynx and Sea King helicopters, working in partnership with UK MOD Integrated Project Teams, AgustaWestland and Boeing. DARA Rotary has been sold to Vector Aerospace, along with DARA Components at Almondbank (see below).
- DARA Electronics - RAF Sealand in Deeside, Flintshire
- DARA Components - Almondbank: provides the capability for repair, modification and testing of an extensive range of hydraulic and transmission components found in both air and land systems for the UK MOD and civilian applications. This business also branched into the commercial sector (See Almondbank page).

== History ==
From the outset, DARA seemed beset by a series of ongoing battles between Ministers, the MOD, the RAF and regional interests, especially the Welsh around RAF St Athan.

DARA was formed around a strategy of integrating RAF, Navy, MOD and private expertise to increase efficiencies of aircraft maintenance and repair to the RAF and Navy, and hence reducing costs. The plan was built around a key base to form a centre of excellence, chosen as the existing RAF Maintenance base at St Athan, to create "factory" levels of expertise. RAF St Athan at DARA's peak employed 2,500 people, over two thirds of DARA's 3,500 employees.

In December 2000, then Welsh Secretary Paul Murphy and Armed Forces Minister John Spellar met to discuss the future of RAF St Athan, following concerns expressed by John Smith, MP for the Vale of Glamorgan. They announced the base's future was "secure".

=== Project Red Dragon ===
In March 2002, John Smith again asked for further assurances on progress around Project Red Dragon, a proposed plan to co-develop RAF St Athan as an aerospace centre of excellence as a public/private partnership. The government partners included the MOD, DARA and the Welsh Development Agency, who would work in partnership to develop the base.

In March 2003 DARA and Armed Forces Minister Adam Ingram confirmed that DARA and the MOD would go ahead with the hi-tech maintenance centre - securing 3,300 Welsh jobs. Additional jobs would be created by allowing access to the super-hangar by commercial aviation partners, which National Assembly for Wales First Minister Rhodri Morgan said could potentially create a further 4,000 jobs. Welsh Secretary Peter Hain said it was "superb news".

Project Red Dragon would replace RAF St Athan's existing repair centre - spread out across a 1,000-acre (4.0 km^{2}) site - and create a new, state-of-the-art facility. Red Dragon had two unique features which set it apart from other military aviation maintenance contracts:

- Construction of a "super-hangar", which will include 47 bays to work on fighter aircraft. The bays could be reconfigured to allow engineering teams to also work on heavy-lift, fixed-wing aircraft as well as heavy-lift helicopters such as the Chinook.
- The only Western military facility which would be able to develop its aviation maintenance arm using finance raised from the private sector

=== Contract loss and review ===
In October 2003, the Transport and General Workers' Union Deputy General Secretary Jack Dromey said the government was considering abandoning Project Red Dragon. Dromey said it would be "outrageous" for the MOD to back away from the scheme now it had been given the government's blessing: "That would be absolutely wrong - not in the best interests of the Royal Air Force, not in the best interests of a loyal workforce."

In March 2004, DARA lost out on a £150 million contract to upgrade the GR7 Harrier to GR9 specification, to upgrade the plane and allow additional life cycle until replacement by the F-35 "Lightning" Joint Strike Fighter. The MOD concluded that the bid by the RAF based out of RAF Cottesmore made more sense from both an operational and cost view point.

In March 2004 DARA announced the loss of 550 jobs at RAF St Athan. 360 posts went as part of streamlining to make DARA more efficient and better able to compete with the private sector for lucrative aircraft repair contracts. The second and more controversial reason is that DARA lost out to the RAF for a contract, worth £150m, to upgrade the airforce's fleet of ageing Harrier jump jets.

=== Privatisation ===
In December 2004, the MOD decided that DARA's Fast Jets and Engines businesses would be closed by April 2007, whilst the Rotary, Components and Large Aircraft businesses were offered for potential sale to see whether this would result in better value for money for UK defence and improved prospects for employees. Effectively, this was the announcement of a U-turn in strategy by the MOD to centralise aircraft maintenance, and the break-up of DARA by privatisation of its various divisions.

On 14 April 2005 the new Project Red Dragon super-hangar opened. Jim Cooper, general secretary of Prospect, the union representing specialist civilian staff in the MOD, called for plans to privatise DARA to be scrapped. Cooper said Dara was in a perilous position, as it was in danger of losing the facilities which were designed to make it a world-class aviation centre. A spokesman for the MOD said that work on the Tornado F3 would remain at St Athan for the jet's life-span, but that the situation after that was not yet known: "Unless additional work can be found, it is unlikely we can maintain a viable business at St Athan beyond 2008/9."

On 10 October 2006 the RAF showcased the first production GR9 Harrier at RAF Cottesmore. Defence Procurement Minister Adam Ingram said the jet will eventually be phased out by 2015 when the new F-35 "Lightning" Joint Strike Fighter arrives in the next decade.

The Fast Jet and Engines businesses closed in March 2007.

On 22 May 2007 it was announced by the Minister of State for Defence Equipment and Support, Lord Drayson, that DARA would be merged with ABRO, the Army Base Repair Organisation. It was also stated that the VC10 maintenance unit at RAF St. Athan would not now be privatised. The new Defence Support Group was established from 1 April 2008.

== See also ==
- Aerospace industry in the United Kingdom
- RAF Sealand
