= Defence Support Group =

Former government agency in the United Kingdom

Agency overview
- Formed: 2008
- Dissolved: 2015
- Jurisdiction: United Kingdom
- Headquarters: Andover, England, United Kingdom
- Minister responsible: Philip Dunne MP, Parliamentary Under-Secretary of State
- Agency executive: Archie Hughes, Chief executive
- Parent agency: Ministry of Defence
- Website: www.dsg.mod.uk

The Defence Support Group (DSG) was an executive agency and wholly owned trading fund of the Ministry of Defence in the United Kingdom. It was established on 1 April 2008 by the merger of the Defence Aviation Repair Agency and the Army Base Repair Organisation. It was created under The Defence Support Group Trading Fund Order 2008. Part of the group was sold to Babcock International on 31 March 2015, while the remainder became the Defence Electronics and Components Agency (DECA) on 1 April 2015.

== History ==
DSG employed about 3,500 staff, with its head office in Andover. Annual turnover was in excess of £200 million. The chief executive was Archie Hughes, formerly from the Defence Aviation Repair Agency.

DSG offered maintenance, repair and overhaul of military air and land equipment, mobile and in-barracks equipment support, fleet management, calibration, electronics, components and logistic support. It was one of the largest defence engineering service providers in the UK.

DSG undertook a partnership with both Deeside College and Airbus UK to train its aeronautical engineers based at RAF Sealand.

=== Sale ===
In October 2010 the government announced that DSG was to be sold off, along with other corporate assets, telecommunications spectrum and Marchwood Military Port.

In November 2014, Babcock International was announced as the preferred buyer of DSG's land repair and maintenance business, and a sale for £140 million was reached in December 2014. The sale was completed on 1 April 2015.

The remaining air division and the Electronics and Components business unit remained under MOD ownership, and on 1 April 2015 became the Defence Electronics and Components Agency.

== Installations ==
The main sites were:

- Ashchurch
- Bovington
- Catterick
- Colchester
- Donnington
- Sealand
- St Athan
- Stafford
- Stirling
- Warminster

Smaller support sites were:

- Aldershot
- Bicester
- Sennybridge
