= LeisureDome, Weston-super-Mare =

Unbuilt leisure facility in North Somerset, England

Coordinates: 51.3409°N 2.9021°W

LeisureDome was a proposed indoor ski slope for Weston-super-Mare, Somerset, England. It was to be located on the site of the former RAF Locking, which closed in 1999. Planning permission for the LeisureDome was granted by North Somerset Council on 21 July 2011. Subject to final approval by the Secretary of State for Communities and Local Government, construction, which was estimated at £50 million, was expected to commence in December 2011. The ski slope was originally planned to open in early 2013, but construction was delayed, later cancelled.

In 2015, the future of the project was in doubt because of the need for additional funding, and no mention of the LeisureDome proposals appear on the information provided by St. Modwen Properties, the developers about their plans for Locking Parklands as the site is now known.

== Facilities ==
The plans approved by North Somerset Council had included a 210-metre (690 ft) indoor ski slope, a 40-metre (130 ft) climbing wall, a vertical wind tunnel for indoor skydiving, indoor surfing, a BMX track, a health and fitness club, and a number of shops and restaurants. The ski slope was to be the longest in the United Kingdom, and the climbing wall the tallest of its kind in the world. In total the LeisureDome was to contain 33,112 square metres (356,410 sq ft) of floor space including 2,536 square metres (27,300 sq ft) for retail use and 1,237 square metres (13,310 sq ft) for restaurants.

The planned Extreme Rock Climbing Centre was to include lead climbing, top roping, bouldering and competition walls.
