= MOD St Athan =

Ministry of Defence site in Wales

- St Athan, Vale of Glamorgan in Wales
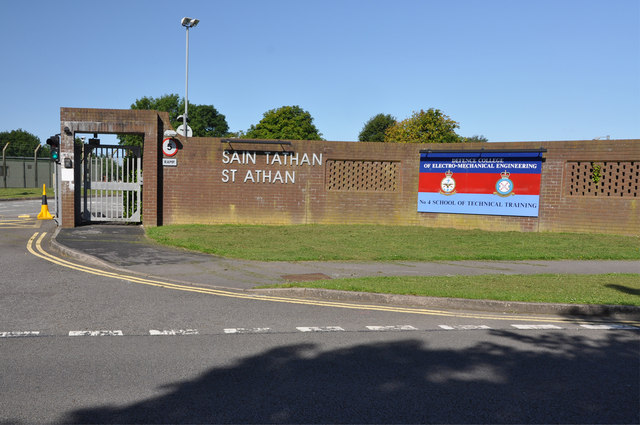
- One of several entrance gates to MOD St Athan.

Site information
- Type: Military base
- Owner: Ministry of Defence
- Condition: Operational
- Website: www.raf.mod.uk/our-organisation/stations/mod-st-athan/

Location
- Location in the Vale of Glamorgan MOD St Athan (the United Kingdom)
- Coordinates: 51°24′17″N 003°26′09″W

Site history
- Built: 1936
- In use: 1938–Present

Garrison information
- Occupants: University of Wales Air Squadron (RAF); No. 634 Volunteer Gliding Squadron (RAF); Special Forces Support Group (SC); The Band of The Prince of Wales's Division (Army)

Airfield information
- Identifiers: IATA: N/A (formerly DGX), ICAO: EGSY (formerly EGDX), WMO: 03716
- Elevation: 50 metres (164 ft) AMSL
Runways
Direction	Length and surface
07/25	1,828 metres (5,997 ft) Asphalt
- Airfield transferred to civilian use. Source: NATS eAIS Package United Kingdom

Ministry of Defence St Athan or MOD St Athan (Welsh: Maes awyr Sain Tathan), formerly known as Royal Air Force St Athan, or more simply RAF St Athan, is a large Ministry of Defence unit near the village of St Athan in the Vale of Glamorgan, southern Wales.

The base was home to the RAF No. 4 School of Technical Training throughout its life, as well as a major aircraft maintenance unit. St Athan has also been used to house British Army units, including the 1st Battalion, Welsh Guards. At one time it was home to a large collection of historical aircraft.

The only flying unit to operate out of St Athan on a regular basis is the Universities of Wales Air Squadron. This unit is one of fifteen RAF University Air Squadrons, flying Grob Tutors. 2300 Squadron of the Air Training Corps is also located on the Station.

The airfield part of the site was transferred from military to civilian control on 1 April 2019. It is now owned by the Welsh Government and known as Bro Tathan airfield, and is home to Bro Tathan Business Park. MOD St Athan continues to exist, comprising the barracks area which is adjacent to the airfield.

The airbase is a prominent scrapping facility, used by eCube, together with Horizon Aircraft Services (formerly Hunter Flying).

== History ==
=== RAF St Athan ===
==== Early days ====
The station officially opened as RAF (Royal Air Force) St Athan on 1 September 1938 and the first unit to take up residence was No. 4 School of Technical Training (4SofTT). In 1939, the station's activities were expanded with the arrival of a fighter group pool, the School of Air Navigation, and a maintenance unit.

==== Second World War ====
RAF St Athan station badge

The UK's aircraft interception radar efforts were briefly housed at St Athan in late 1939 and early 1940. Prior to the war they had been located with the rest of the radar research efforts at Bawdsey Manor on the east coast, but with the opening of hostilities they were quickly moved to a tiny civilian airfield, Perth Airport (Scotland) outside Perth. Yet the conditions there entirely unsuited to their efforts. After a short search, St Athan was selected for the AI team while the rest of the researchers stayed in Dundee. When they too found the conditions unsuitable, both teams moved to Worth Matravers in May 1940.

A Special Duty Flight was formed at the station on 14 November 1939 to support the aircraft-borne radar efforts. It was established from the nucleus of the Station Flight which had been established when the researchers were briefly relocated to Scotland. It lasted less than two years, and was re-designated the Telecommunications Flying Unit in early November 1941. By that time it was located at RAF Hurn.

During the Second World War the station had over 14,000 personnel, and was used for training ground and air crew. It was linked to the aircraft storage and maintenance facility at RAF Llandow.

During the war a dummy airfield was built using wood and cardboard a few miles west of the original airfield and successful efforts were made to hide the proper field (supposedly led by Jasper Maskelyne). Aircraft and buildings were made of cardboard and wood and some real, but old tractors were driven around the site. The Germans attacked the dummy field a number of times and it was rebuilt each time. On 15 July 1940, four 250-kilogram (550 lb) bombs failed to explode, 2 of them near assembly sheds. It was unclear to the newly appointed bomb disposal team led by Colonel Stuart Archer GC whether they were dealing with delayed action fuses -then causing major disruptions to vital buildings and airfields or more likely booby-trapped devices. The decision was taken to move the bombs to be detonated elsewhere.

The following units were here at some point:

- 'U' Flight of No. 1 Anti-Aircraft Co-operation Unit RAF
- No. 4 Air Stores Park
- No. 5 Air Stores Park
- No. 5 Salvage Centre
- No. 9 Aircraft Storage Unit
- No. 11 Group Pool
- No. 12 Radio School RAF
- No. 14 Radio School RAF
- No. 19 Maintenance Unit RAF
- No. 32 Maintenance Unit RAF
- No. 68 Gliding School RAF
- No. 417 (General Reconnaissance) Flight RAF became No. 1417 (General Reconnaissance) Flight RAF
- No. 634 Gliding School RAF
- No. 2850 Squadron RAF Regiment
- No. 2955 Squadron RAF Regiment
- Aircraft Recovery and Transportation Flight
- Pilotless Aircraft Section, became Pilotless Aircraft Unit RAF
- School of Air Navigation RAF, became No. 1 School of Air Navigation RAF
- Signals Instructor School RAF
- Special Installation Flight RAF

==== Post war ====
After the war, airmen of the Airframe and Engine trades continued to train at St Athan, but in 1955 this training dispersed to RAF Kirkham and RAF Weeton. 4SofTT then became a Boy Entrant School, with new recruits being trained in engine and airframe mechanics, and armament, electrical and instrument mechanics. It was at this time that approval was given by the Airforce Board of the Defence Council for the formation of 2300 Sqn ATC. Following the demise of the Boy Entrant scheme in 1965, airman training returned to St Athan for the vehicle and general and Airframe, Engine aircraft maintenance trades.

Between May 1947 and August 1973, St Athan was also home for the Administrative Apprentice Training School, which provided a 20-month training programme for boys who enlisted to become clerks or work in accounting, supply and administration, prior to posting to other RAF units for a 12-year term of service.

During the 1960s, a driving school was established. Recruits that needed to drive (RAF Police, MT (Mechanical Transport) drivers, etc.) were trained in a fleet of Morris Minors, including "Travellers", and were taught basic maintenance. The driving tests were normally taken in Cardiff and, once students had passed, they were then allowed to train in night and motorway driving, and practise on a skid-pan.

St Athan also became the major RAF maintenance base for Dominie, Vulcan, (minor servicing also from 1980) Victor, Buccaneer, Phantom, Harrier, Tornado, Jaguar, Hawk and VC10 aircraft, originally under direct RAF control, but latterly under the auspices of the Defence Aviation Repair Agency (DARA). Highly specialised major servicing of the Battle of Britain Memorial Flight's Avro Lancaster bomber was also conducted at RAF St Athan.

A new Aircraft Paint Facility of No. 1 Engineering Squadron, RAF St Athan was opened by the Permanent Under Secretary of State, MoD, Sir Michael Quinlan during January 1991. The site carried out major servicing for VC-10s from February 1992 taking over from Brize Norton, along with third line maintenance for Hawks and Jaguar taking over from RAF Abingdon. The Victor Major Maintenance Unit was disbanded on 1 March 1992. The unit was formed at RAF Marham on 14 September 1988.

RAF St Athan has been used to house a number of army units throughout its life and, in 2003, the 1st Battalion, Welsh Guards moved from Aldershot to St Athan – the first time they have been based in Wales since they were formed in 1915.

In March 2003 it was confirmed that a new hi-tech maintenance centre would be built, creating 3,300 jobs. Additional jobs would be created by allowing access to the super-hangar by commercial aviation partners. Project Red Dragon would replace RAF St Athan's existing repair centre – spread out across the 1,000-acre (400 ha) site – and create a new, state-of-the-art facility. In March 2004, however, DARA announced the loss of 550 jobs at St Athan as part of streamlining to make DARA more efficient and better able to compete with the private sector for lucrative aircraft repair contracts, but also because they lost out to a direct RAF bid for a contract to upgrade the air force's fleet of ageing Harrier jump jet aircraft.

The MOD later decided that DARA's 'fast jets' and engines businesses would close by April 2007, although the 'large aircraft' business would continue. On 14 April 2005, the Project Red Dragon super-hangar opened and DARA moved its VC10 operations from its existing 'Twin Peaks' hangar into the new facility. A 2009 report from the National Audit Office concluded that "The MOD and the Welsh Authorities did not work sufficiently closely during the project. Although they had complementary objectives, there was no common purpose between them, with the MOD interested in securing more efficient repair of fast jets and the Welsh Authorities interested in safeguarding and creating jobs in South Wales. The MOD and the Welsh Authorities did not have a shared understanding of each other’s key assumptions. The Red Dragon project highlights the danger in large and complex projects that involve multiple public bodies of insufficient openness and information sharing."

=== MOD St Athan ===
In 2006, the Special Forces Support Group was raised at St Athan and the Welsh Guards returned to London. The station was renamed as Ministry of Defence St Athan (MOD St Athan). A large swathe of land was acquired by the Welsh Government and commercial aircraft companies such as ATC Lasham started to operate from buildings such as the former VC10 hangars. DARA steadily drew down their 'fast jet' and engines operations, closing both by April 2007; the 'large aircraft' business continued as part of the Defence Support Group (DSG) until its closure in 2012.

In 2009, building work was due to commence on a new defence training academy with its heart at St Athan. This had followed the Defence Training Review, when three companies tendered for two separate contracts, with the Metrix consortium being awarded the contract for package 1 (package 2 was later withdrawn). The Welsh Government then reintroduced its original plans to create an aviation business park, including the site in the St Athan and Cardiff Airport Enterprise Zone. Bruce Dickinson set up Cardiff Aviation Lt. in the former VC10 hangars known as Twin Peaks. In addition, eCube (specialising in scrapping aircraft), together with Horizon Aircraft Services (formerly Hunter Flying) (MRO of military aircraft) took up occupation.

The training to be carried out at St Athan was to be specialist phase 2 and phase 3 engineering courses of the Royal Navy, Army and Royal Air Force. They include those courses delivered today within the Defence Colleges of Aeronautical Engineering, Electro-Mechanical Engineering and Communications and Information Systems. Phase 2 training involves initial trade training for the armed forces; phase 3 training involves continuous professional development. In addition, some training of overseas troops in the same disciplines was to be accommodated.

The new academy was expected to create up to 5,000 jobs at St Athan, with a £14 billion investment over 25 years and an estimated £57.4 million spent into the local economy. It was to accept its first intakes in 2012 and was to be fully operational in 2017 when the last of the current training centres closed. However, changes in all these elements of the plans were brought out by anti-Metrix campaigners. Phase 3 training was deleted with reduction to a PFI total of £11 billion, the 'academy' was downgraded to a Defence Training College, the number of jobs was halved and most disclosed as not created but transferred from other MOD sites. A principal member of the Metrix consortium (the 'blue-chip' Land Securities Trillium) withdrew, to be replaced by Sodexo. A public inquiry into compulsory purchase of land opened in January 2009 gave opportunity for local communities and Welsh organisations (Cynefin y Werin; Friends of the Earth, Cymdeithas y Cymod, Green Party) to challenge the development. The MOD and Welsh Government accepted the size was cut by more than half, but maintained their demand for the same size of estate for accommodation and support facilities. They also retained the environmentally damaging and costly approach road, though opposed strongly by local communities. Being politically sensitive, the decision on the inquiry was held up for 18 months.

The MOD continued to negotiate the project with the Metrix consortium, but the price rose several times, reaching £14 billion in mid-2009. The decision was delayed till after the 2010 election. Then, on 19 October 2010, the DTR project was cancelled and Metrix UK lost its status as preferred bidder. On 18 July 2011, the Minister announced that MoD Lyneham would instead be used as an integrated training centre.

The last aircraft to be serviced at DSG St Athan, a Vickers VC10, departed the site on 23 February 2012 and the last remaining employees were made redundant.

On 23 February 2016, Aston Martin announced that their new factory to build its DBX crossover model would be built on the airfield at St Athan. Construction of the 90-acre (36 ha) site would commence in 2017, with a total investment of $280 million and the creation of 750 jobs. The factory will incorporate the Project Red Dragon super-hangar which had cost the British taxpayer £113m. The U.S. state of Alabama, along with two UK sites and a Middle Eastern location, had been on Aston's shortlist for the factory. Aston unveiled the DBX at the 2015 Geneva Auto Show; DBX production was to start in 2020 with an output of up to 5,000 units a year envisaged.

The airfield part of the site was transferred from military to civilian control on 1 April 2019. It is now owned by the Welsh Government and known as Bro Tathan airfield, and is home to Bro Tathan Business Park. Bro Tathan North is currently home to the South Wales Aviation Museum. The military continues to have a presence adjacent to the airfield, which is known as MOD St Athan.

In December 2020, the last ever flight of a British Airways Boeing 747-400, registration G-BYGC, landed at St Athan, having departed nearby Cardiff Airport, where it had been stored. This aircraft is painted in the heritage BOAC livery, and will be preserved, along with two of its sister aircraft that were sent to Dunsfold Aerodrome in Surrey, and another which was sent to Cotswold Airport in Gloucestershire.

=== Relocation of No. 4 School of Technical Training ===
There was an intention to move No 4. School of Technical Training (No. 4 SoTT) from St Athan to MoD Lyneham as the Army (REME) schools that are relocating there carry out similar engineering training functions; however, a decision by 22 Training Group to keep capbadges together (RAF with RAF) seems to have changed the direction of No. 4 SoTT, with it now potentially moving to RAF Cosford to rationalise the Defence College of Technical Training (DCTT) training establishments, a move confirmed in an announcement by Defence Secretary Michael Fallon on 15 September 2015.

In October 2017, the Ministry of Defence (MOD) stated the plans to move No. 4 SoTT were not sufficiently mature to provide a date for the move. The MOD indicated in September 2019 that the intent remains to relocate the school before the lease on its buildings expires in March 2024. The future location and time-frame to relocate the school was yet to be finalised. The school relocated to MOD Lyneham in 2024.

== Based units ==
As of November 2025, the following units are based at MOD St Athan:

=== Cyber & Specialist Operations Command ===
Directorate of Special Forces

- Special Forces Support Group

=== Royal Air Force ===
No. 22 Group

- No. 6 Flying Training School
  - No. 1 Air Experience Flight – Grob Tutor T1
  - Universities of Wales Air Squadron – Grob Tutor T1

== Air accidents ==
On 26 August 1993 an ATC civilian instructor was seriously injured and the RAF Volunteer Reserve pilot, Group Captain Roger Sweatman, was killed when their Chipmunk trainer, on an air experience flight, crashed after encountering difficulties during a simulated emergency low-height manoeuvre on take-off. The pilot attempted to recover the aircraft in a reciprocal approach; however, it struck the roof of the engine repair and overhaul squadron hangar and crashed to the ground at the foot of the adjacent hangar. The accident was investigated by an air crash investigation team and was attributed to pilot error.

Just before 1100 GMT on 11 February 2009, two Grob Tutor aircraft flying out of St Athan were involved in a mid-air collision in which two Air Training Corps cadets and their instructors, both RAF pilots, died. With the cause of the incident uncertain, three separate enquiries were undertaken, including one by the Air Accidents Investigation Branch. The AAIB investigation report, published on 3 November 2010, concluded that the two aircraft simply failed to see each other due to obstructions on the canopy structure and the relative size and lack of conspicuity of the aircraft. The two cadet passengers were cousins and were named as Katie Jo Davies, 14, and Nikitta Walters, 13; the RAF pilots were named as Flying Officer Hylton Price and Flight Lieutenant Andrew Marsh.

== In media ==
The proximity of the BBC production facility at Roath Lock (and previously Upper Boat Studios) makes St. Athan a popular choice for location shooting, and it has appeared in such TV programmes as Torchwood, Doctor Who and Sherlock, and also in the films The Killer Elite and Mr Nice.

== See also ==
- List of Royal Air Force stations
