= No. 1 Radio School RAF =

- School badge
- Active: 1915–1998; 2003 – present
- Country: United Kingdom
- Branch: Royal Air Force
- Type: Defence training school
- Role: Communications and information systems training
- Part of: Defence School of Communications and Information Systems
- Locations: RAF Cosford (Headquarters); RAF Digby
- Motto: Thorough

Insignia
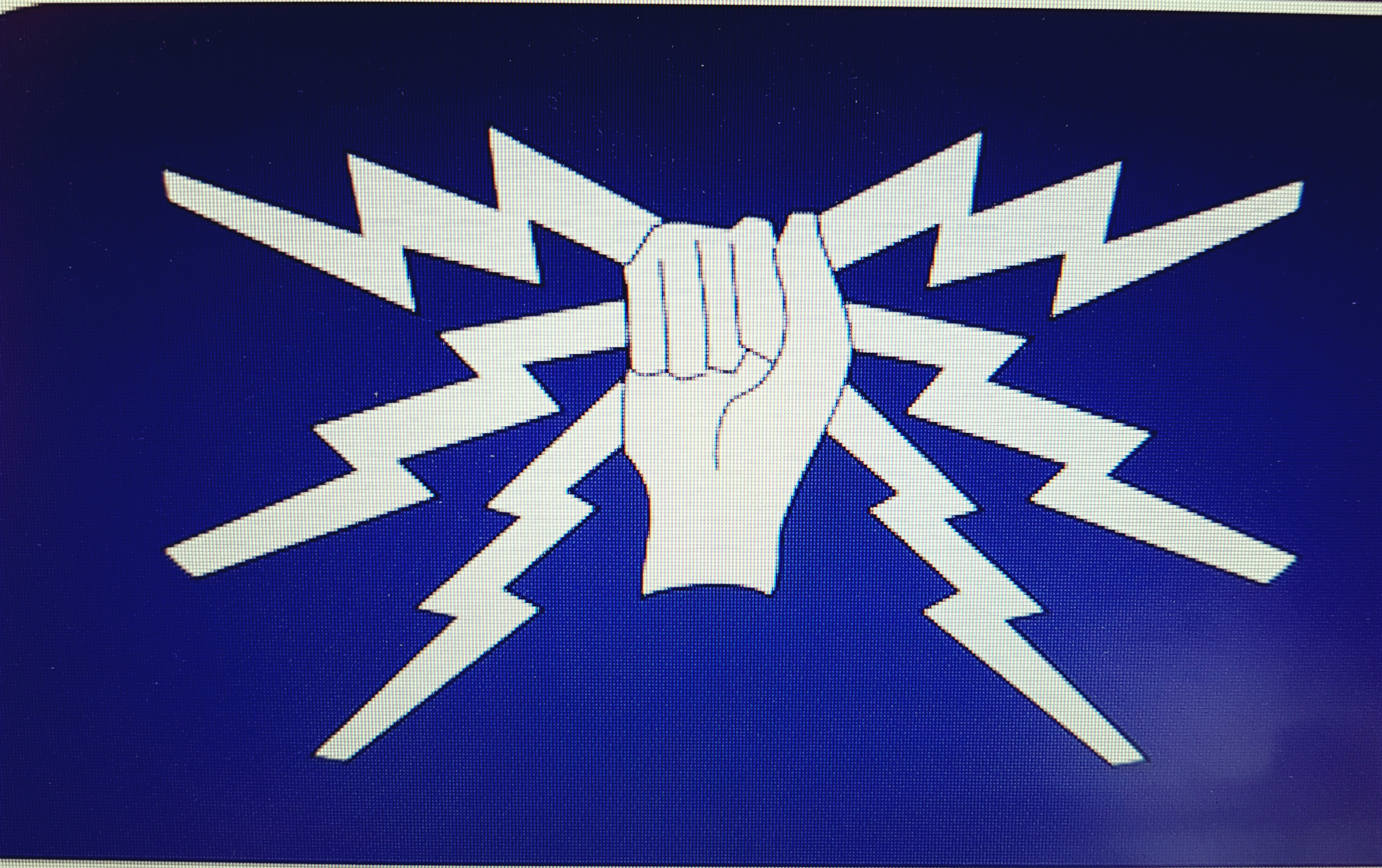
- Logo

No. 1 Radio School is based at RAF Cosford and forms part of the Defence School of Communications and Information Systems. Its motto is Thorough, which was the motto of the Royal Air Force Electrical and Wireless School.

== Mission ==
"To train and develop Air minded war-winners to enable Information Advantage through Cyber and Space capabilities to achieve Cross Domain Effects across the RAF and Defence"

== History ==
The School was originally known as The School for Wireless Operators, and was part of the Royal Flying Corps, when it was formed at the Town Hall, Farnborough in 1915. The school was transferred to the Royal Air Force (RAF) in 1918 when the RAF was formed by Lord Trenchard, in 1919 the school was moved from Farnborough to RAF Flowerdown in Hampshire.

The school had a number of name changes from The Electrical & Wireless School, to No 1 Signals School, until finally becoming known as No 1 Radio School in 1943, when all radio and signal schools were called radio schools and there were 15 in total.

In 1950 the school moved from RAF Cranwell to RAF Locking where it remained for the next 48 years, until it was disbanded on 1 Oct 98, where it became known as Communications-Electronics (C-E) Training Wing, 1 School of Technical Training (Det RAF Locking). The school was then re-formed at RAF Cosford as No 1 Radio School, in Flowerdown Hall on the 60th anniversary of No 1 Radio School in 2003.

The school also incorporates the Aerial Erector School (AES) which is based at RAF Digby.

== Role ==
No. 1 Radio School is responsible for Phase 2 and 3 training of RAF Engineering Communications Electronics (Eng CE) officers, Trade Group 4 Cyberspace Communications Specialists (formerly I.C.T. Technicians) and Communications Infrastructure Technicians (commonly known as Aerial Erectors).

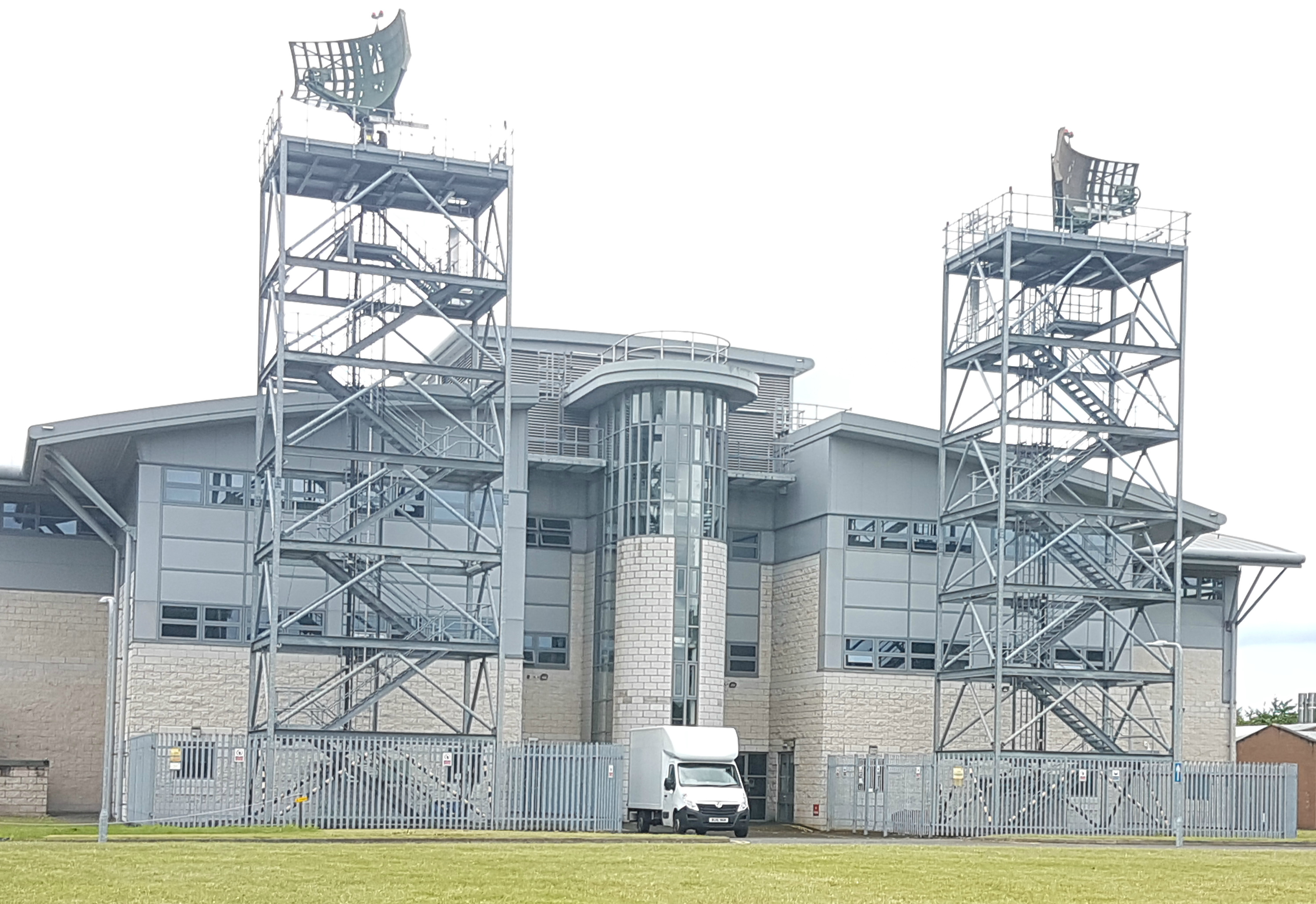
No 1 Radio School, DSAE Cosford

Phase 2 Training:

- Phase 2 training provides initial specialist training to prepare Service personnel for their first employment in the wider RAF. Phase 2 training normally follows on from Phase 1 Training, which is initial training in the basic military skills required by all Service personnel.

Phase 3 Training:

- Phase 3 Training prepares Service personnel for further employment with increased skill base and/or responsibility. It also encompasses training to meet career aspirations and professional development.

== Training ==
The Radio School currently consists of 3 squadrons to deliver and support all the required Phase 2 & 3 training. These squadrons consist of:

- Training Delivery Squadron (TDS) which comprises 5 flights:
1. Air Defence and Systems (ADAS) Flight - Covers Air Defence RADAR systems, Air Field Navigational aids and communication systems. These courses are primarily Phase 3 operational courses for locations around the World.
2. Network Applications - This area covers Network Applications and Network Information Systems including Cyber Courses as well as an introduction to Programming.
3. Network Infrastructure. This flight covers core network installation and fault resolution tasks; specifically: Health & Safety, Data Communications theory and installations, Information Technology Essentials, Introduction to Networks and Structure Cabling.
4. Networks Deployed. This area focuses on the theory and practical execution of Radio and Satellite Communications from a Phase 2 aspect and delivers the DII Land Deployed Phase 3 training.
5. Engineering Management Training Flight. The Phase 2 training of Engineering Officers', Phase 2 training of Information Communication Technology technicians in Air Operations and technical documentation as well as the delivery of Trade Management Training for newly promoted Junior and Senior Non-Commissioned Officers.
- Academic Accreditation Group (AAG). Deals with all the relevant course accreditation to professional bodies and companies including the management of the No1 Radio School CISCO Academy programme.
1. Cyberspace Communications Specialist phase 2 students - Lecturers deliver communication principles (Maths, Electronics, Radio) and Information Management principles.
2. Foundation Degree students - Lecturers deliver advanced communications and Radar principles, CISCO network management training along with Information management and Cyber Security delivery.
3. Phase 3 training - Lecturers deliver CISCO Network theory and practical training via CISCOs NetAcad platform and through the use of physical equipment as well as Information administration and management training. These courses ensure students are fully prepared for front-line operational environments.
- Training Management Support Squadron (TMSS) is split into 4 flights and 1 school:
1. Trainee Management Flight (TMF) - Hold responsibility for the discipline, welfare, care and management of all students within No 1 Radio School, whether phase 2 or 3.
2. Engineering Support Flight (ESF) - Manage the provision, delivery and installation of all engineering requirements within the School, from mobile and fixed IT infrastructure and equipment to Radar systems used in the delivery of training.
3. Business Development Flight (BDF) - Collate, coordinate and deliver on business cases throughout No 1 Radio School, providing new and upgraded equipment and infrastructure in support of training.
4. Support Flight (Spt Flt) - Provides administrative support to all No 1 Radio School personnel and students.
5. Aerial Erector School (AES) - Provides specialist Working at Height (WaH) and cable infrastructure training for Defence.

=== Roles ===
==== Cyberspace Communications Specialists ====
The purpose of Cyberspace Communications Specialist training is to train Cyberspace Communication Specialists to meet the RAF's requirement for Cyber, communication, computers, information networks, sensors and detection systems, in order to undertake air operations.

Students undertake a 34-week specialist training course at No. 1 Radio School, RAF Cosford. This course prepares the students for their first tour at an operational unit, giving them skills and experiences ranging from Radio Principles to Network Administration and Cyber Security.

==== Communication Infrastructure Technician (CIT) ====
The purpose of CIT training is to provide specialist Working at Height (WaH) and cable infrastructure training. Students undertake a 26-week specialist training course at RAF Digby.

==== Engineering Officer Further Training (Communications Electronics) (EOFT (CE)) ====
The purpose of EOFT (CE) is to prepare newly commissioned Junior Officers for their foundation tours as cyberspace engineers and information specialists. Upon completion of Initial Officer Training at RAFC Cranwell, students complete a 26-week training course that prepares newly commissioned junior officers for, and provides them with the skills necessary to undertake, the many varied first tours that an Eng (CE) officer might undertake. The key theme throughout the course, which is split over three terms, is to embed an appreciation of how technology is a key enabler of operations. Term 1 of the course provides an introduction to communications doctrine, communications organisations within Defence and the responsibilities of an Eng (CE) officer, as well as an academic module looking at RADAR and telecommunications principles. Term 2 builds on the application of those modules taught during Phase 1, and introduces the officers to cyberspace and information services, systems and applications. The final term of the course consolidates the earlier taught modules and culminates in a scenario-based final exercise that simulates and assesses the officers in the type of environment that they could expect to find themselves in their first tour as Eng (CE) officers.

In order to enhance their learning and to continue their development, the officers undertake a number of visits to RAF stations and joint organisations, such as RAF Waddington, Air Command, and the Permanent Joint Headquarters, and undertake an adventurous training and force development package.

== Qualifications ==
No. 1 Radio School is a Cisco accredited academy, with the training that the students receive being recognised by a wide range of civilian employers and backed by transferable qualifications.

Students completing the Defence Cyber Protect training also achieve the CompTIA Security+ (S+) and Cyber Security Analyst (CySA+) qualifications
