= Army Base Repair Organisation =

Former executive agency in the UK

The Army Base Repair Organisation (ABRO) was an executive agency which reported to the United Kingdom's Ministry of Defence. It provided engineering, repair and re-manufacturing services to the British Armed Forces and also to the police and some local councils. ABRO traced its history back to the foundation of the Corps of Armourers in 1858.

== History ==
On 1 April 1993, the Army's static workshops in Great Britain, previously under the control of the Equipment Support Organisation, were reorganised as the Army Base Repair Organisation. It comprised the headquarters at Andover, a contract repair branch and a network of base and district workshops. It employed 3,581 civilian workers and 219 military staff.

Apart from the HQ at Andover, there were other major units at Bovington, Old Dalby, Leics, Catterick, Colchester, Donnington, Stirling and Warminster. Smaller sites were located at Bicester, Edinburgh, Sennybridge and York.

On 1 April 2002, the Army Base Repair Organisation was established as a trading fund under the name ABRO.

Its services included:

- Maintenance, repair and overhaul
- Complex service and repair
- Assembly, integration and test
- Calibration
- Diagnostics
- Fleet management
- Mobile support teams
- Obsolescence management
- Re-manufacture
- Workshop management

ABRO's annual turnover was typically in excess of £147 million and each year carried out work on over 1,000 product lines of military and commercial vehicles and equipment, as well as over 55,000 ad hoc repair tasks.

On 22 May 2007, it was announced by the Minister of State for Defence Equipment and Support, Lord Drayson, that ABRO would be merged with DARA, the Defence Aviation Repair Agency to become the Defence Support Group with effect from 1 April 2008.
