= MOD Sealand =

UK Ministry of Defence installation

- Queensferry, Flintshire in Wales
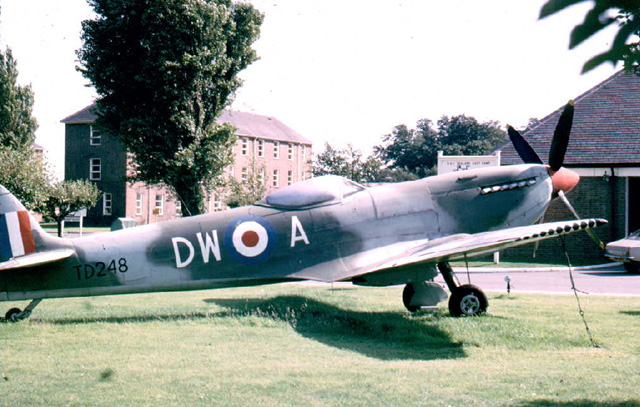
- Spitfire LF.16 gate guardian on display at RAF Sealand's East Camp in 1975.

Site information
- Type: Military base
- Owner: Ministry of Defence
- Operator: Defence Equipment and Support
- Controlled by: DE&S Deca
- Condition: Operational

Location
- Shown within Wales
- Coordinates: 53°13′28.4″N 002°59′37.4″W

Site history
- Built: 1916 (as RFCS Shotwick)
- In use: 1916–1918 (Royal Flying Corps); 1918–1951 (Royal Air Force); 1951–1957 (US Air Force); 1957–2004 (Royal Air Force); 2004–present (Ministry of Defence)
- Battles/wars: European Theatre of the Second World War (RAF)

MOD Sealand (formerly RAF Sealand) is a Ministry of Defence installation in Flintshire, in the northeast corner of Wales, close to the border with England.

It was a Royal Air Force station, active between 1916 and 2006. Under defence cuts announced in 2004, RAF Sealand was completely closed in April 2006. All remaining RAF units at the site were moved to RAF Leeming.

The site is now operated as a tri-service MOD installation and is home to DE&S Deca.

== History ==
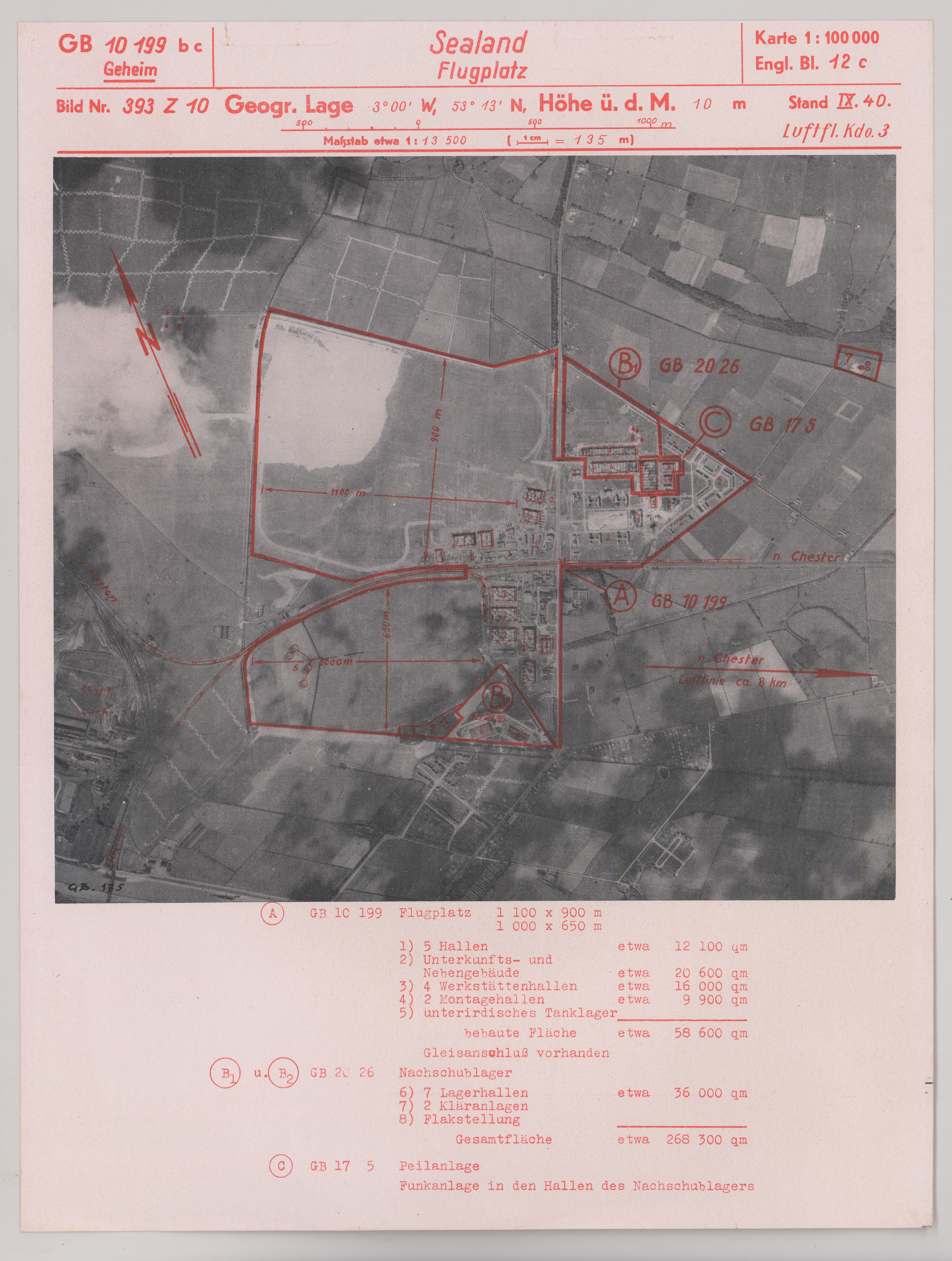
RAF Sealand on a target dossier of the German Luftwaffe, 1940

Clwyd-Powys Archaeological Trust says the site is nationally important as it became home in 1916 to a flying school which, during World War I, was requisitioned by the War Office becoming RAF Sealand in 1924. The report said: "The site of the former Dutton's Flying School is an incredibly important historical location, effectively the origin point of the initial Royal Flying Corps and later RAF as a fighting force. "The degree to which any traces of Dutton's aerodrome survive as sub-surface deposits is currently unknown as there have been no investigative works."

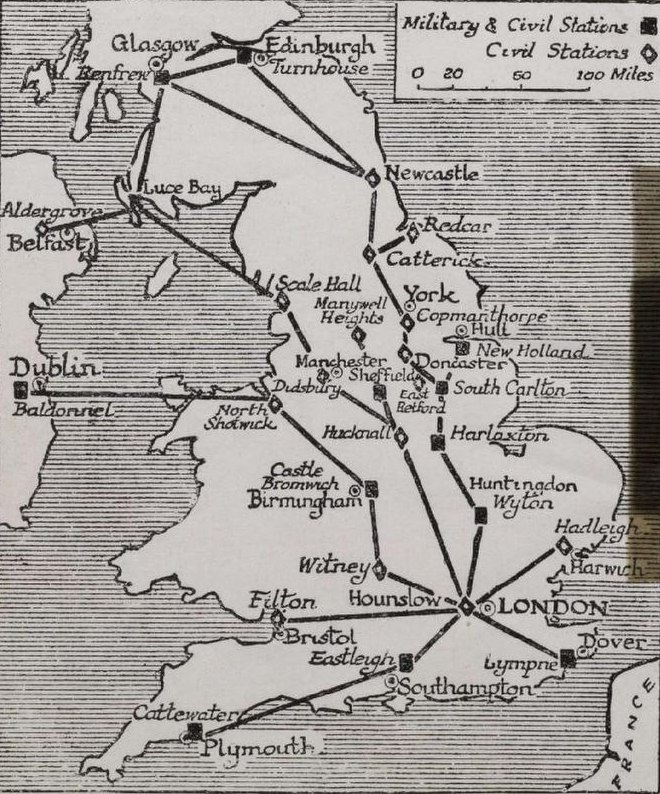
"Map of Air Routes and Landing Places in Great Britain, as temporarily arranged by the Air Ministry for civilian flying", published in 1919, showing "North Shotwick" as a "civil station", and as a stop on the route between Hounslow, near London, and Baldonnel, near Dublin.

It was originally a civilian airfield and was taken over by the military in 1916 for training. Two twin hangars, which were built in 1917, were used by the newly formed Royal Flying Corps. Originally named RFCS Shotwick and later RAF Shotwick, the station was finally named RAF Sealand in June 1924.

Immediately before World War II and in the early years of that war, it was the home of No. 5 Flying Training School RAF (5 FTS), equipped with Airspeed Oxfords. During the war, the Flying Training Schools provided what was in effect intermediate training for pilots who had received ab initio training and flown solo at an EFTS (Elementary Flying Training School) and who had subsequently been inducted into the RAF. Pilots thus arrived at No. 5 FTS RAF Sealand as APOs (Acting Pilot Officers) and upon satisfactory completion of intermediate training became Pilot Officers (POs), and were prepared for posting to a squadron or OTU (Operational Training Unit). Kenneth Cross spent time at No. 5 FTS as an instructor in the early 1930s. From 5 August 1940, the CFI (Chief Flying Instructor) was Edward Mortlock Donaldson. Amongst the pilots who trained at 5 FTS, RAF Sealand was Johnnie Johnson.

No. 30 Maintenance Unit RAF was formed there in 1937. In 1941 No. 19 Elementary Flying Training School RAF equipped with Tiger Moths was located at RAF Sealand.

In 1951 the station was taken over by the United States Air Force. The 30th Air Depot Wing was located at Sealand, but plans were made to relocate it to RAF Brize Norton, both in the UK. Most assigned personnel of the 30th Air Depot Group were reassigned to the 7558th Air Depot Group of the 59th Air Depot Wing, effective from 26 November 1951. All staff sections of the 30th Air Depot Wing were dissolved, and a Consolidated Adjutant and Military Personnel Section was formed. 30th Air Depot Wing was relieved from assignment to the 59th Air Depot Wing effective 27 November 1951. 30th Air Depot Wing began operating as a tenant organization at RAF Sealand, with base support for the wing being provided by the 7558th Air Depot Group as of 27 November 1951. Jurisdiction of RAF Sealand was transferred from the 30th Air Depot Wing to the 7558th Air Depot Wing on 27 November 1951. It was handed back to the RAF in 1957.

Sealand became a communications support base for RAF operations around the world. It functioned as a third-line repair station for avionics equipment for all three services. The Royal Air Force Almanac 1995 said that No. 30 Maintenance Unit RAF was at the time the main unit for airborne electronic and instrument equipment.

No. 631 Volunteer Gliding Squadron RAF, initially operating the Slingsby T.21 Sedbergh glider and subsequently the Viking TMk1 conventional winch-launched glider, operated at Sealand from 1963.

The gate guardian at the main gate until 1988 was Spitfire TD248. It was restored to flying condition in the 1990s.

In March 2006, No. 631 VGS relocated to RAF Woodvale to operate the Grob109b 'Vigilant' self-launched motorglider.

The Defence Aviation Repair Agency (DARA) took over the site in 2006 and handed it over to its successor organisation, the Defence Electronics and Components Agency (DECA), in 2015.

The MOD has previously contemplated using the site for several purposes, one of the most controversial of which was to turn it into an emergency prison to help deal with prison overcrowding in England and Wales.

Permission was given in 2012 for a 5,000 job employment site, along with 1,000 homes. In 2015, the Welsh government agreed to fund a link road to the community so that building could start.

In 2019, DECA was granted a new Gate Guardian, to replace the Spitfire with a GR4 Tornado, Tail Number ZA607, due to the long standing relationship that the DECA site has with the Tornado aircraft

== Current use ==
MOD Sealand is a global repair hub for maintenance, repair, overhaul and upgrade services for the Lockheed Martin F-35 Lightning II aircraft.

In 2023, the DECA was subsumed into the wider Defence Equipment and Support (DE&S) to become DE&S Deca, whose role is dedicated to maintenance, repair, overhaul, upgrade, procurement and managed services provision across Defence electronics, components and general equipment support.

Facilities at MOD Sealand include clean rooms, faraday cages, radar chambers, calibration laboratory, cryptographic facility, storage and warehousing, 3D printing capability, aircraft components bay and cryogenics bay. Major customers include Ministry of Defence, BAE Systems, Northrop Grumman, General Dynamics, Thales, Rolls Royce, Raytheon, L3 Wescam, United States Department of Defence, Lockheed Martin, MBDA and more.

The MOD is set to establish an Advanced Technology Research Centre (ATRC) at MOD Sealand. The ATRC will conduct research in areas such as cybersecurity, software engineering, space, radio frequency, advanced sensing technologies, and next-generation propulsion.

Sealand Ranges are still used for shooting, where units from the forces and civilian target shooting clubs come to compete or practice shooting.

== In popular culture ==
The RAF base lent its name to the 1981 song "Sealand" by Wirral band Orchestral Manoeuvres in the Dark.
