= DE&S Deca =

UK defence organisation

Agency overview
- Formed: 2015
- Jurisdiction: United Kingdom
- Headquarters: MOD Sealand, Flintshire
- Minister responsible: Rt Hon Maria Eagle MP, Minister of State for Defence Procurement and Industry
- Parent agency: Defence Equipment and Support
- Website: www.gov.uk/government/groups/des-deca

DE&S Deca, formerly the Defence Electronics and Components Agency (DECA), is an operating centre within Defence Equipment and Support (DE&S). It was formed as an executive agency of the UK Ministry of Defence in April 2015 from the air division of the Defence Support Group, which was retained when the rest of the group was sold to Babcock International. In April 2023 it ceased to be an executive agency and was merged into DE&S.

DE&S Deca provides maintenance, repair, overhaul, upgrade and obsolescence management for a diverse range of avionic and electronic equipment. It is a global repair hub for maintenance, repair, overhaul and upgrade services for the Lockheed Martin F-35 Lightning II aircraft avionic and aircraft components.

DE&S Deca is predominantly based at MOD Sealand in Deeside, Flintshire. It also has a presence in MOD Stafford.
