= Metrix UK =

British joint-venture defense company

Metrix UK Ltd is a joint venture company, originally a 50/50 equity partnership between QinetiQ and LandSecurities Trillium, specifically set up to bid for the two main contracts under the UK Government's 2001 Defence Training Review (DTR) rationalisation programme. Contract 1 involves provision of training for engineering and communications for the whole of the British Armed Forces, while contract 2 was to provide training for logistics, security, policing and administration.

On 17 January 2007, it was announced that the Metrix consortium had been awarded Preferred Bidder status for Package 1 of the DTR programme, and Provisional Preferred Bidder status for Package 2. Metrix was expected eventually to reduce the current defence training estate from about 30 current sites to about 10 in the future, with a main campus to be located at an MOD site at St Athan in southern Wales.

On 31 January 2008, the Government announced that it had become apparent that the Metrix Consortium is not able to offer an affordable and acceptable Package 2 solution and, as a consequence, alternative approaches were being considered. This did not have any impact on the commitment to the Package 1 Metrix solution, which was still to be vigorously pursued.

On 11 December 2008, Land Securities confirmed, in light of the significantly increased bid costs, that Trillium was withdrawing from its role as a partner in the Metrix consortium. Their place was taken by Sodexo (originally a consortium member, rather than partner).

On 19 October 2010 the DTR project was cancelled and Metrix UK lost its status as preferred bidder.

== Consortium members ==
The full Metrix consortium is made up of:

- AgustaWestland
- City & Guilds
- Currie & Brown
- Dalkia (part of Veolia Environnement)
- EDS
- Laing O'Rourke
- Nord Anglia Education
- QinetiQ
- Raytheon
- Serco
- Sodexo
- The Open University
