= Communications and information systems of the British Armed Forces =

The British Armed Forces operates a wide range of communications and information systems (CIS). Some of these are specialised military systems, while others are procured off-the-shelf. They fall into three main categories: satellite ground terminals, terrestrial trunk communications systems, and combat net radio systems. Every part of the British Army uses combat net radio, but only the Royal Corps of Signals and the Royal Air Force operates trunk systems and multi-channel satellite communications.

== Satellite communications ==
Satellite ground terminals play an important part in modern military communications, in view of their high bandwidth and their independence of local communications infrastructure.

=== In-service systems ===
==== TALON ====
Talon is a lightweight deployable terminal which uses off-the-shelf commercial technology packaged to provide a terminal suitable for military use. The terminal is controlled from a ruggedised laptop and can be set up by a crew of two trained operators within 30 minutes. Talon has been employed by the ARRC (Allied Rapid Reaction Corps) in Germany and was used extensively in Operation TELIC in Iraq. Talon terminals were brought into service in July 2002 and were incorporated into the Skynet 5 contract in October 2003. Each terminal can be carried in a single vehicle, towing the generator mounted on a trailer.

==== REACHER ====
Reacher comprises the mobile satellite ground terminals that give military ground forces communications access through Skynet 5 satellites. There are two variants in service with the British Army, Royal Air Force and Royal Marines. Reacher Medium is a ruggedised land terminal with a 2.4m antenna designed for X-Band military satellite communications. It is designed to operate with a deployed advanced headquarters, and is carried on a MAN truck with a detachable cabin and towing a trailer.

Reacher Large is mounted on the same vehicle as Reacher Medium, but has a 4.8 m antenna. Reacher All Terrain is in service with the Royal Marines and is mounted on two BV206 vehicles with associated trailers. All Reacher terminals are transportable using Chinook helicopters, by sea and by rail. The systems are supplied by EADS Astrium subsidiary company Paradigm Secure Communications.

=== Small SATCOM ===
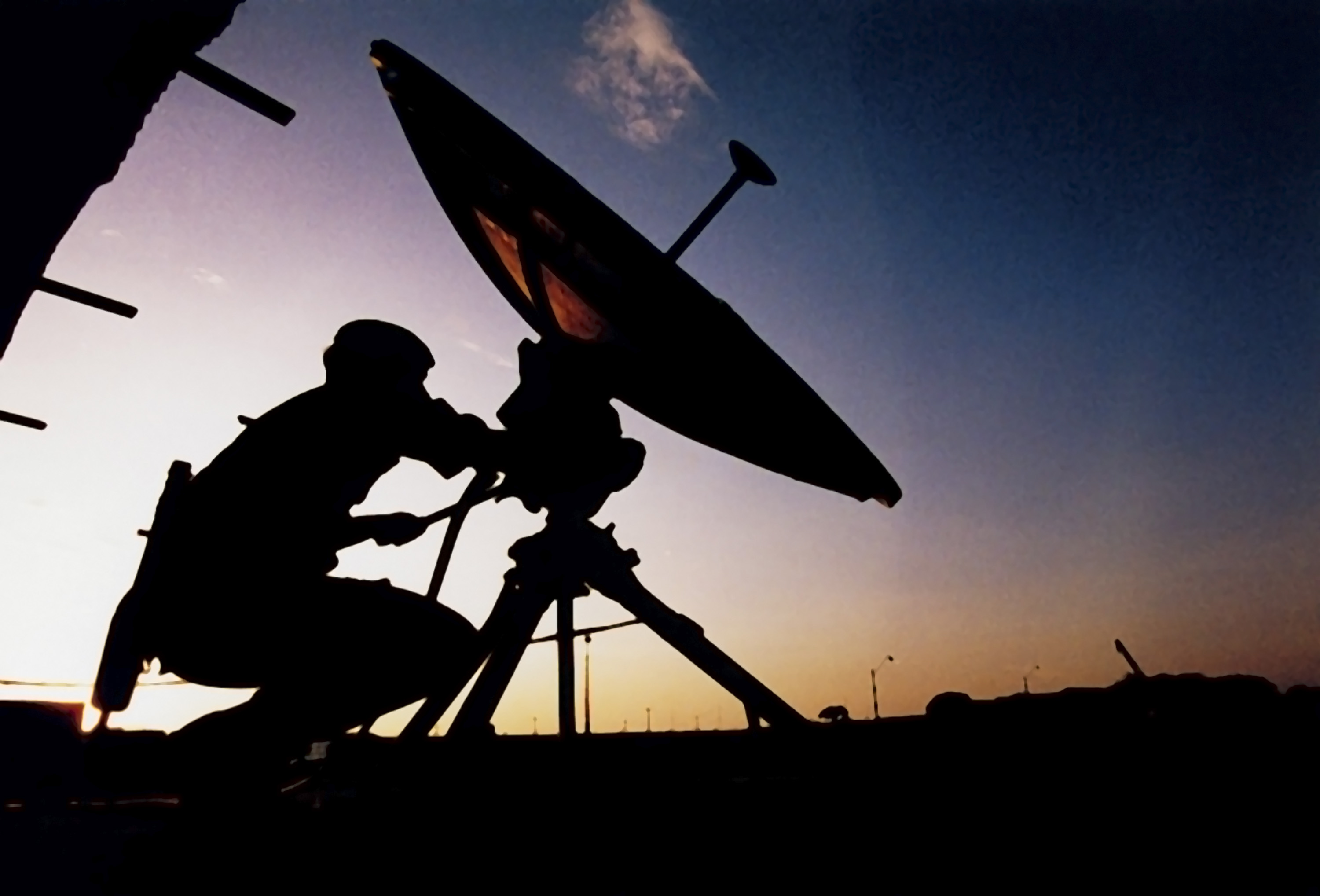
Earlier small SATCOM satellite ground terminal in 2000

Small SATCOM capability consists of a SWE-DISH CCT-120 satellite ground terminal owned by Paradigm Secure Communications. The ground terminal uses the Skynet 5 network. This provides a service to users on operations worldwide. The satellite ground terminal is lightweight, easily air transportable and can be set up by a single trained operator in less than 30 minutes.

=== No longer in service ===
==== VSC 501 ====
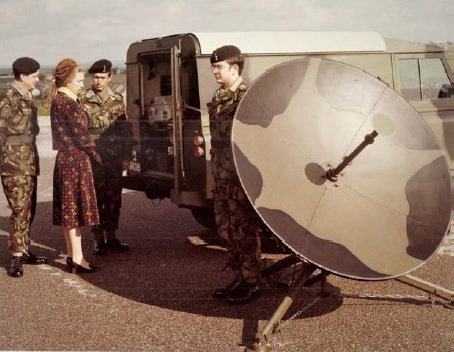
A Landrover based VSC 501 being shown to Princess Anne at Blandford Camp

The VSC 501 was a vehicle-mounted tactical military satellite terminal, initially operated by 249 Signal Squadron (AMF(L)) (disbanded) and then by 30th Signal Regiment, the Royal Air Force Tactical Communications Wing (now 90 SU), and the Royal Marines. It operated in the military SHF SATCOM frequency band of 7.25 to 8.4 GHz via a geosynchronous satellite, with a data rate of up to 512 kbit/s. The normal manning level for an VSC 501 station was a crew of two and the system could be set up to provide communications within 15 minutes.

The VSC 501 was the workhorse of the UK tactical military SATCOM system for some years. It was carried in both Land Rovers (Army) and BV 206 All Terrain Vehicles (Royal Marines). An update and enhancement package was completed in late 1999, which included a self-tracking antenna to replace the previous hand-adjusted variant, extended the life of the terminal for several years. Deployments include the Gulf during Operation GRANBY and Bosnia. The VSC 501 was made by Marconi, based on the Racal TSC 501 satellite equipment.

==== TSC 502 ====
The Racal TSC 502 was a transportable satellite ground terminal. It was used by 30th Signal Regiment on Operation CORPORATE in the Falklands War. It was replaced by the TSC 503 in the mid 1990s.

==== DAGGER ====
Dagger is a Land Rover-mounted modular military and civil band satellite communications system designed for rapid deployment and installed in a hard top Land Rover 110 TD5. It was supplied by SELEX Communications, and saw service in the Balkans, Afghanistan and on Operation TELIC.

==== PSC 504 ====
PSC 504 was an X-band military satellite communications system designed to provide Special Forces with a highly secure, reliable, flexible and rapidly deployable manpack SATCOM system. Manpack patrol terminals fit in the top of a standard Bergen rucksack. The terminals could be assembled and connected to the satellite network within five minutes by one soldier, even in darkness, to provide long-range secure voice, data and messaging services, as well as a store and forward (e-mail-type) facility. Data services operated at up to 64 kbit/s.

==== PSC 506 ====
PSC 506 terminals operated as an autonomous network that employed Demand Assigned Multiple Access technology and provided secure speech and secure data. Key elements were Fixed Communications Bases, portable Headquarters Terminals and Patrol Terminals. The system was used from the late 1980s to 2012. The system was developed by Thales from a trials model developed by the Signals Research and Development Establishment, later Royal Signals and Radar Establishment, in the late 1970s.

==== TSC 503 ====
The TSC 503 is a transportable compact multi-role satellite bridging system manufactured by SELEX Communications. It can be deployed in two forms: the first is a rapid deployable terminal with 2 MB/s capability that can be on-air in 30 minutes with a two-man crew. The larger full capability terminal, with a 4M antenna, has much increased capacity and a time-into-action of two hours with a four-man crew. Users can be located up to 4 km from the antenna and is one of the most prominent satellite. The terminals are composed of a number of man portable containers. TSC 503, which entered service in mid 1990s, is now no longer in service.

== Computer systems and networks ==
=== Defence Information Infrastructure ===
Defence Information Infrastructure (DII(F)) is one of the largest information infrastructure programmes in Europe. It will provide a computing infrastructure and services that will enable sharing of information and collaborative working to a variety of groups and individuals including those that currently have limited or no connectivity. Ultimately it will provide around 300,000 user accounts on approximately 150,000 terminals across about 2,000 MoD sites worldwide. DII will be central to transforming the capability of the Armed Forces by providing Network Enabled Capability through a single network of information. It will extend into the operational arena, interface with battlespace systems and improve shared information between headquarters, battlefield support and the front line, allowing greater interoperability between the MoD and its allies.

=== GEOINT ===
A deployable geospatial intelligence unit, this allows for situational awareness on a wide scale. With GEOINT exploitation and map production capabilities from strategic to tactical levels, it can update frontline troops with digital map updates for cohesive intelligence across the entire battlefront. Mounted on MAN trucks, the British Army has taken delivery of 11 GEOINT Stations with 3 vehicle-mounted tactical distribution systems.

=== No longer in service ===
- OVERTASK - On Operation HERRICK (Afghanistan), the OVERTASK network was used for strategic through to the tactical levels of command. This supports applications that deliver situational awareness, office tools and collaborative working.
- ARRC C2IS - As well as the core networks the HQ ARRC had its own ARRC Command and Control Information System (ARRC C2IS) to provide a Battle Management System and office automation.
- J1/J4 IOS - In addition to OVERTASK, the J1/J4 Interim Operational Support (J1/J4 IOS) system was in operation in Afghanistan but serving significantly more users than it was originally designed for. J1/J4 IOS supports Restricted information transfer and applications such as Joint Personal Administration.
- Joint Operational Command System - the JOCS provided digitised tools for controlling joint operations. With the formation of the Joint Rapid Reaction Force the requirement for a joint computer system was formed. This system provided a sophisticated operational picture, along with staff tools for controlling joint operations.
- Army Tactical Computer System - the Army Tactical Computer System (ATacCS) provided the Army with a LAN and WAN based command and control system across the battlespace.

== Satellites ==
=== Skynet (Satellite network) ===
Skynet is a family of military satellites, which provide strategic communication services to the three branches of the British Armed Forces and to NATO forces engaged in coalition tasks.

In 2013, new types of Skynet terminals were delivered, utilising Skynet's new Internet Protocol (IP) based modular infrastructure. Vislink Mantis terminals and Snapper baseband equipment for land forces, SCOTPatrol terminals for small vessels, and transportable IP Domain nodes for large land forces or air bases. In 2020 further units were purchased along with Vislink NewSwift ground terminals.

== Terrestrial trunk radio relay ==
Terrestrial trunk radio relay systems are primarily used to connect the headquarters of brigades, divisions and higher military formations. They typically deliver voice and data services, and can be based on boxed or palletized equipment, or vehicle installations, which may be mounted under armour for use on the battlefield.

=== In-service systems ===
==== FALCON ====
FALCON has replaced Ptarmigan with a new generation tactical trunk communications system, manufactured by BAE Systems Military Air and Information. It will deliver secure voice and data over an all Internet Protocol system across multiple security domains. The system is fielded by the Royal Signals and the Royal Air Force.

The key platforms will be the Wide Area Service Provision (WASP) nodes with up to six radio links and a series of Command Post Support (CPS) nodes which will be scaled for headquarters of differing sizes, further supported by transportable (palletised) and early entry nodes. All wheeled platforms will utilise the British Army's standard MAN HX 60 Cargo Vehicle (Light) platform.

=== No longer in service ===
==== BRUIN ====
Introduced in 1967, BRUIN was the Army's first area trunk network mounted in both wheeled and tracked vehicles, which connected formation headquarters and units using multi-channel UHF radios. BRUIN provided a partially secure and automatic system for the transmission of both voice and teleprinter traffic. It was the primary trunk communications system of the British Army of the Rhine from 1967 to 1982. During the Cold War, Royal Signals units in the 1st British Corps trained with BRUIN. They deployed their equipment and vehicles among the woods and farms of northern West Germany, putting their skills to the test in an annual cycle of command and signal exercises.

==== Ptarmigan ====
Ptarmigan was a mobile, cryptographic digital and modular battlefield wide area network communications system based on the Plessey System 250 architecture. It was initially designed to meet the needs of the British Army of the Rhine in West Germany, and replaced the BRUIN system. The system consisted of a network of electronic exchanges known as trunk nodes. These nodes are connected by multichannel UHF and SHF radio relay links that carry voice, data, telegraph and facsimile communications. The Single Channel Radio Access subsystem is effectively a VHF secure mobile telephone system that gives isolated or mobile users an entry point into the network.

First delivery of Ptarmigan equipment was to 1 Armoured Division HQ and Signal Regiment in December 1984, and it entered service in February/March 1985. Subsequent upgrades include the introduction of an Air Portable Secondary Access Node for 16 Air Assault Brigade, and the General Purpose Trunk Access Port software enhancement which provides interconnectivity to other nations' tactical communications systems.

Ptarmigan's system design was the result of detailed studies and feasibility trials carried out jointly by the UK MoD, the Royal Corps of Signals and Royal Signals and Radar Establishment (RSRE), the British Army Royal School of Signals and industry. The Plessey Company, subsequently Siemens Plessey Systems and then a constituent part of BAE Systems was appointed prime contractor and system design authority for Ptarmigan in 1973, with responsibility for engineering development of the complete system. The initial development programme was followed by a series of production contracts worth some £500 million. They covered the provision of the full range of Ptarmigan items from small individual equipments, such as subsets, to major vehicle-mounted installations such as switches and SCRA radio centrals.

A major phased enhancement programme to provide high-integrity packet switched data, including mobile X.25 packet access, international interfacing and the development of equipment for use in armoured vehicles commenced in 1984 and was completed in 1992. BAE Systems was the appointed design authority for supporting the system throughout its post-design phase. This covers the full range of support services from components and equipment up to network level.

During the 1991 Operation Granby, Ptarmigan was deployed extensively throughout the operational area with extended satellite trunk links, and was heavily used by British and Allied forces. The system gained further in-service use when deployed in support of the International Peace Implementation Force (IFOR) in Bosnia. Total investment in Ptarmigan by mid-1992 was approaching £1 billion. In August 1993, a £22 million contract was awarded to modify the system to allow deployment over long distances with satellite links.

==== Cormorant ====
Cormorant was the area trunk communications network that linked the component headquarters of the British Joint Rapid Reaction Force. The system was manufactured by the European EADS company. Cormorant had two basic elements:

- The local access component, based on an ATM switch, provided local digital voice subscriber facilities and a high speed data local area network for over twenty headquarters.
- The wide area component allowed the interconnection of these headquarters across a large geographical area, as well as the means to interconnect with single service and multinational systems. The system was containerised and could be operated in either vehicle mounted or dismounted mode. The underlying technology was based on open standards such as ATM and TCP/IP.

A Cormorant network consisted of the following installations:

- Local area support module
- Core element
- Bearer module
- Long-range bearer module (tropospheric scatter)
- Management information systems
- Interoperable gateways
- Tactical fibre-optic cabling
- Short range radio

== Combat net radio ==
Combat net radio systems are typically used for tactical communications at section and platoon level upwards. They are operated by soldiers from every part of the Army as well as the specialists from the Royal Corps of Signals.

=== In-service systems ===
==== Bowman ====
Bowman is the name of the tactical communications system used by the British Armed Forces. The Bowman C4I system consists of a range of HF radio, VHF radio and UHF radio sets designed to provide secure integrated voice, data services to dismounted soldiers, individual vehicles and command HQs up to Division level.

==== Personal Role Radio (PRR) ====
The Personal Role Radio is the standard means of communication between members of a fire team, section or platoon. Depending on operational requirements, PRRs may be carried by all members of a section or key roles only such as 1IC, 2IC or pointman. However, typically all members of a section would be equipped with a PRR.

=== No longer in service ===
==== Larkspur (obsolete) ====
Larkspur was the combat net radio system used by the British Army in the 1960s and replaced by Clansman in the late 1970s.

==== Clansman (obsolescent) ====
Clansman was the combat net radio system used by the British Army from the late 1970s until its replacement by Bowman.

== Wireless Telegraph ==
Before 1914:

The British Army first experimented with wireless equipment in a war theatre in 1899, when they had sent newly developed ‘portable wireless stations’ to the Boer War to establish wireless telegraph communications between the British forces encamped in that region. Due to natural forces, particularly lightning and dust storms, the project was abandoned shortly after in February 1900 by the Director of Army Telegraphs. The project was not a complete failure at the time, as the British Navy was able to integrate the systems onto their ships successfully.

The equipment was more suitable for them than the Army because their location gave them the aerial length and connectivity needed for the frequency, while the South African terrain proved to have unsupportive ground conduction, which limited energy transmissions. This experience helped the Army spend the next few years studying and building their technical communications equipment, especially in preparation for the First World War.

In 1909, the London Wireless Company of Territorials, which was attached to the Royal Engineers, experimented with spark telegraphy for the British Army. The equipment used in the war was produced by Marconi’s Wireless Telegraph Company in 1913. These sets used a 21m mast aerial and had a range of up to 250 km. They were exceedingly large and had to be transported by motor car.

The Great War, 1914-1918:

When the war broke out, an assessment of the British Army's wireless telegraphy revealed that a basic system of point-to-point telegraph links would be the most efficient way to meet their intercommunication needs. Wireless equipment was extremely limited and still not entirely reliable, therefore only about a dozen wireless devices were brought to France with the British Expeditionary Force in August 1914. The technology was initially introduced when the Army had limited practical experience with wireless communications, leading army recruiting officers to seek civilian volunteers from the Post Office to work as operators.

Recognizing the urgent need for training in operating and maintaining service wireless equipment, the Marconi Company took on the responsibility of training a substantial number of wireless operators. This effort resulted in over ten thousand trained telegraphists by 1916 alone, significantly enhancing the Army's wireless communication capabilities during the war.

Communication across different sectors, both from the rear areas to the front line units and horizontally along the front line, consistently posed challenges and frequently resulted in battle failures. In 1914, the decision was made to associate wireless telegraphy primarily with the mobile cavalry corps. The equipment was exclusively assigned to the cavalry due to the difficulty of providing rapid communications by other means, however senior officers in the field did not fully appreciate the technology at that time. By December 1914, the cavalry had found themselves on the front line, leading to a reduced role for their wireless equipment in mobile communications. Trench warfare was dominating military operations, which relegated wireless equipment to a minor static role in military operations.

On the ground, Signalers were using a variation of equipment and methods for visual signalling or to send messages, including flags, lamps, and heliographs. One of the other communication technologies present at the time was the telephone. Although it was considered reliable, its usage was limited and restricted to rear areas or for artillery fire control. Despite these earlier reservations held by high command regarding the civilian magneto-electric telephone, it became widely used at the front by early 1915.

A shortage of trained telegraphists drove this shift due to casualties, expansion, and the convenience of telephones in local operations. To put this disadvantage into perspective, the Canadian Corps had double the number of wireless units per person compared to the British forces, which allowed them to excel in signals intelligence and outperform equivalent British endeavours, as they were already monitoring both enemy and certain Allied plaintext communications. Historian John Ferris notes that this proved immensely beneficial for the Canadians during their Hundred Days offensives, as it positioned them “a generation ahead of any other army.”

On both sides, an elaborate telephone network spanning thousands of miles of wire quickly emerged. This included pole lines with numerous cross-arms and circuits established behind the opposing armies, while buried cables and wires were laid within the intricate trench systems connecting to the frontline outposts. While wire lines were used for long-distance communication, they faced numerous challenges, such as disruptions from shallowly buried cables, busy communication channels, and enemy shelling. Attempts to address these issues included laying completely new cables instead of repairing damages and gaps, however this led to problems like inductive loops causing cross-talk interference, which made telephoning nearly impossible and was straining telegraphists deciphering wanted signals from interfering ones.

The use of telephones also posed security risks, as over-hearing enemy transmissions became a significant aspect of signal operations for both sides. Security breaches were common until officers learned to encode important signals and limit telephone calls. Concerns about military telephone usage grew when it was discovered that conversations could reach towns far behind German lines via intact civilian magneto-telephone service. British military buzzer signals could be intercepted by anyone on nearby telephone lines, highlighting the challenges in maintaining secure communication. These difficulties led to strict measures by 1916, forbidding telephone usage within a few kilometres of the German lines due to the inability to impose effective security measures.

As the second year of static trench warfare began, the British Army adopted a more organized approach to signal communications - this included the recovery of the scattered disused or damaged cables, as well as implementing better construction, maintenance, and labelling of working cables. They improved their systems by using twisted line pairs, therefore avoiding an earth return. Steel-armoured and brass-sheathed cables were laid wherever a semi-permanent installation could be justified to minimize inductive pick-up and strengthen the cables.

By 1915, the use of visual indication of received Morse signals, like magnetic needles, was abandoned in favour of auditory devices. Operators could use a sensitive headset to listen to the telegraphic information being transmitted. The integration of a headset freed their hands, allowing them to write down the signal without the assistance of a 'reader' to interpret the moving needle. This also made the system less susceptible to electric or audible interference, which increased the security of communications.

At the time, both the Germans and the British were devising a new technique and use for simple spark transmitters as part of the development of earth induction telegraphy. These transmitters, which were produced by the Marconi Company, were an issue because they created interference for any grounded receiving set nearby. Although this system proved invaluable to the Allies when used to connect advanced sections at the front and for infantry communications, this form of ground transmission was eventually withdrawn due to the significant source of security leakage created by the interference it emitted.

This disadvantage led to the development of a unique form of communication telegraphy in the British Army known as the 'Fullerphone.' The idea was to substitute the alternating line current with a minimal direct current, which would be broken up in the receiving instrument itself at an audio frequency. The Morse key acted as a switch to permit the direct current to pass down the line in accordance with the dots and dashes, while the vibrator, now located within the receiver, acted on the received current to interrupt it at an audio rate that could then be heard in the receiving headphones. The direct current in the line caused extremely little induction, reducing the danger of overhearing. The Fullerphone proved very successful and was being manufactured in large numbers by 1916. It even remained in use in the Second World War as a main line communications device.

After the trials with the Marconi Company's commercial spark transmitters, the British military undertook efforts to address deficiencies in the operation and utilization of wireless equipment, especially as newer sets became available for deployment with forward troops. These strategic efforts were driven by the necessity to catch up with advancements in German technology, which were pushing the boundaries of wartime communication capabilities. Among the available wireless sets were the British Field set, the Wilson set, and the loop set, all of which were equipped with spark transmitters.

While the British Field and Wilson sets were substantial installations and primarily utilized at headquarters and corps locations, the loop set stood out as a portable option suitable for unskilled operators. Its design emphasized portability and inconspicuousness, making it a valuable tool in battlefield communication systems. The initial deployment of the loop set took place during the Battle of Loos in September 1915, where its limited communication range of 2 kilometres posed no significant disadvantage. Meanwhile, the larger spark sets, operating on distinct wavelengths such as 350, 450, and 550 metres, were allocated separately to each corps within the Army. This allocation strategy helped minimize interference between different communication channels, ensuring more reliable and efficient wireless transmissions across the battlefield.

Despite the early challenges faced in terms of performance and reliability, improvements were made to enhance the tuning capabilities of the spark sets, making them more effective in transmitting crucial information. The wireless telegraphy trench set emerged as a critical component primarily designated for artillery purposes, also serving as the essential link between forward observation posts and battery positions. While this analysis focuses on the British Army, it is relevant to note that the versatility of this technology also extended to the Air Force, where it functioned as a mobile forward communications system, proving its worth in dynamic combat environments.

An early deployment site for these sets was at Passchendaele, where the difficult terrain rendered traditional cable-laying methods impractical. Despite the challenging conditions, one of the sets maintained communication with Ypres, located 11 kilometres away, throughout prolonged periods of heavy shelling. This continuous communication facilitated the prompt relay of target information to the artillery units for an extended duration, demonstrating the resilience and effectiveness of the wireless communication system in wartime operations. Even when enemy shelling had destroyed that telegraphy set, prompt replacement and reinstallation ensured uninterrupted communication, underscoring the strategic importance and adaptability of these wireless communication technologies on the battlefield.

The initial low priority given to military wireless communication changed drastically as the war progressed, reflecting the evolving demands and experiences on the battlefield. Wireless equipment became indispensable for the artillery, serving purposes such as line communication and establishing forward troop positions. During the latter part of 1916, wireless communication emerged as a highly effective means of maintaining contact between battalion, brigade, and division headquarters, serving as a valuable accompaniment to traditional telephone and telegraph systems. This was particularly crucial in instances where communication lines were disrupted due to shelling, or troops faced challenges in laying buried lines. Notably, the German Army had limited use of wireless technology for line communication in the same sector during that period.

By 1918, wireless telegraphy became an integral part of warfare on the ground, in the air, and at sea. An illustrative depiction of the distribution of various types of wireless equipment across the Allied front reveals a comprehensive setup, as evidenced by the configuration on the First Army front just before the decisive offensive in August 1918. The deployment included a significant number of buzzer telegraphs strategically positioned in forward positions, highlighting the extensive integration of wireless communication infrastructure in frontline operations.
