= Defence School of Communications and Information Systems =

Coordinates: 50°52.2′N 2°7.2′W

- School logo
- Active: 1 April 2004 – present
- Country: United Kingdom
- Branch: British Army; Royal Air Force
- Type: Defence training establishment
- Role: Communications and information systems training
- Part of: Defence College of Technical Training
- Locations: Blandford Camp (Headquarters); RAF Cosford; RAF Digby
- Website: Official website

The Defence School of Communications and Information Systems (DSCIS) is a Defence Training Establishment of the British Ministry of Defence. It was formed on 1 April 2004 and comprises a headquarters and The Royal Signals School at Blandford Camp, and No.1 Radio School at RAF Cosford, including the Aerial Erectors School at RAF Digby.

== History ==
The school was formed on 1 April 2004 as the Defence College of Communications and Information Systems to deliver coherent and cost-effective training across defence. In 2012, it joined three other technical training colleges under a combined organisation, the Defence College of Technical Training, and reverted in title to being a Defence School.

== Constituent elements ==
The establishment comprises several affiliated schools.

=== Headquarters ===
The DSCIS headquarters is at the British Army's Blandford Camp in Dorset. The school reports to the Defence College of Technical Training (DCTT) which, in turn, is part of the Royal Air Force's No. 22 Group. DSCIS operates from Blandford Camp, a 1,200-acre (4.9 km^{2}) site home to various other organisations, mostly CIS related.

=== 11th (The Royal School of Signals) Signals Regiment ===
The training element of the Royal Corps of Signals is the 11th (The Royal School of Signals) Signals Regiment. It is located at Blandford Camp alongside the school headquarters.

=== No. 1 Radio School ===
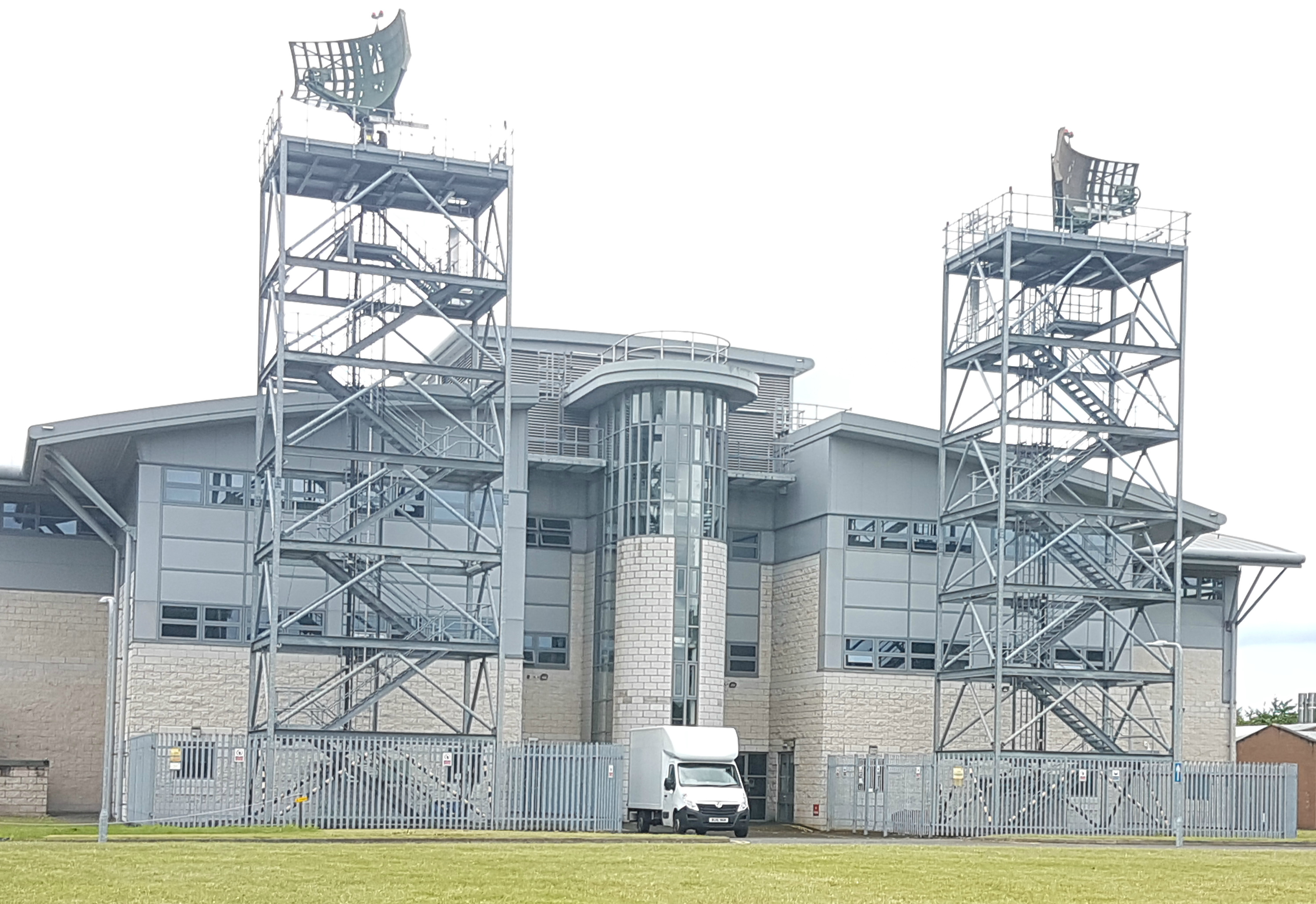
No. 1 Radio School at RAF Cosford.

The Royal Air Force's No. 1 Radio School is based at RAF Cosford in Shropshire. A satellite of the Radio School is the Aerial Erector School at RAF Digby in Lincolnshire.
