= Defence Training Review =

The Defence Training Review was established by the then Defence Secretary, Lord Robertson, on 22 July 1999 to examine all individual training and education, Service and civilian, in the British armed forces. The review report, Modernising Defence Training, was published in 2001. The report highlighted that:

- Future Defence Training needed to be more integrated;
- Training needed to be managed on a defence-wide basis to better support the increasing move towards joint deployments;
- The training estate needed investment and rationalisation to ensure that facilities were used efficiently and were fit for purpose.

These recommendations are at the heart of the Defence Training Review Rationalisation Programme, a large and complex public-private partnership (PPP) seeking to transform the way specialist training is delivered in the future. Under a PPP contract, a prospective partner will be responsible for the design and delivery of the majority of the training but the MoD, via senior military officers, will command and retain overall responsibility for the effectiveness of this training. This strong military presence will be maintained to provide skills training, and ensure that operational experience is shared with students and military ethos is upheld.

The programme consists of two projects termed Package 1 and Package 2. Package 1 involves provision of training for engineering and communications, while Package 2 was to provide training for logistics, security, policing and administration.

== The preferred bidder ==
In January 2007, the Secretary of State for Defence announced that the Metrix consortium had been awarded Preferred Bidder status for Package 1, and Provisional Preferred Bidder status for Package 2. By January 2008, however, the Government had decided that the Metrix Consortium was not able to offer an affordable and acceptable Package 2 solution and, therefore, alternative approaches would be considered.

== Package 1 ==
Metrix's bid included the provision of a new Defence Technical College (DTC) at St Athan. The development was to be complementary to the Welsh Assembly Government's aspirations to create an Aerospace Centre of Excellence at St Athan. The construction programme for the college was scheduled to commence in the autumn of 2010 and would cost an estimated £700m and create 1,500 jobs. However, the project was cancelled in October 2010 and the college was eventually built at MoD Lyneham, Wiltshire.

== Package 2 ==
A separate project team was established at Upavon, operating under the auspices of Director General Army Recruiting & Training, to determine the best way forward for Package 2 training and infrastructure.
