= 2020 New Year Honours =

British royal recognitions

The 2020 New Year Honours are appointments by some of the 16 Commonwealth realms to various orders and honours to recognise and reward good works by citizens of those countries. The New Year Honours are awarded as part of the New Year celebrations at the start of January and were officially announced in The London Gazette on 27 December 2019. Australia, an independent Realm, has a separate honours system and its first honours of the year, the 2020 Australia Day Honours, coincide with Australia Day on 26 January.

The recipients of honours are displayed as they were styled before their new honour and arranged by the country whose ministers advised Her Majesty on the appointments, then by the honour and by the honour's grade (i.e. Knight/Dame Grand Cross, Knight/Dame Commander etc.), and then by divisions (i.e. Civil, Diplomatic, and Military), as appropriate.

== United Kingdom ==
Below are the individuals appointed by Elizabeth II in her right as Queen of the United Kingdom with honours within her own gift and with the advice of the Government for other honours.

=== The Order of the Companions of Honour ===
==== Member of the Order of the Companions of Honour (CH) ====
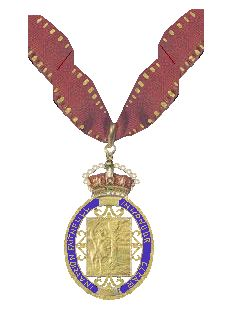
The riband and badge of a Member of the Order of the Companions of Honour

- Sir Elton Hercules John CBE – For services to Music and to Charity
- Sir Keith Vivian Thomas FBA – For services to the Study of History

=== Knight Bachelor ===
- David Julian Bintley CBE. For services to Dance
- Humphrey Burton CBE. For services to Classical Music, to the Arts and to Media
- Professor Anthony Kevin Cheetham FRS, Distinguished Research Fellow, Department of Materials Science, University of Cambridge. For services to Material Chemistry, to UK Science and to Global Outreach
- The Right Honourable George Iain Duncan Smith MP. For political and public service
- Peter Kenneth Estlin, Lately Lord Mayor of London. For services to International Business, to Inclusion and to Skills
- Dr Dennis Barry Gillings CBE. For services to the Advancement of Dementia and to Life Sciences Research
- Francis John Stapylton Habgood, QPM, lately Chief Constable, Thames Valley Police. For services to Policing
- Christopher James Hampton, CBE, playwright. For services to Drama
- Clive Lloyd CBE. For services to Cricket
- Samuel Alexander Mendes, CBE, theatre and film director. For services to Drama
- Robert James Macgillivray Neill, MP. Member of Parliament for Bromley and Chislehurst. For political service
- Menelas Nicolas Pangalos. Executive Vice-President, and President, Biopharmaceuticals R&D, AstraZeneca. For services to UK Science
- Simon Laurence Stevens. Chief Executive of the National Health Service. For services to Health and the NHS in England
- Jonathan Richard Symonds, CBE. Chair, Genomics England and Deputy Group Chairman, HSBC Holdings plc. For services to UK Life Sciences and Finance
- William Gennydd Thomas. For charitable and political service
- Professor Duncan John Wingham. Professor of Climate Physics, University College London and Executive Chair, Natural Environment Research Council. For services to Climate Science
- Andrew William Graham Wylie, CBE. Co-Founder, The Sage Group plc and Chair and Founder, Technology Services Group. For services to Business and charity

Diplomatic Service and Overseas List

- Steven Rodney McQueen CBE. For services to Film

=== The Most Honourable Order of the Bath ===
==== Knight / Dame Grand Cross of the Order of the Bath (GCB) ====
Military Division

- Admiral Sir Philip Jones, KCB, ADC, DL

Civil Division

- Dame Sally Davies, DBE, FRS

==== Knight / Dame Commander of the Order of the Bath (KCB / DCB) ====
Military Division

- General Patrick Sanders, CBE, DSO, ADC Gen

Civil Division

- Melanie Dawes, CB – For public service.
- Alison Saunders, CB – For services to Criminal Justice.
- Jonathan Jones, QC – For public service.
- John Manzoni – For public service.

==== Companion of the Order of the Bath (CB) ====
Military Division

- Major General Timothy John Bevis, RM, CBE
- Rear Admiral Timothy Charles Hodgson, MBE
- Major General Ian John Cave
- Major General Paul Nanson, CBE
- Lieutenant General Richard Nugee, CVO, CBE
- Air Vice Marshal Alastair Norman Crawford Reid, QHP
- Air Vice Marshal Simon Peter Rochelle, OBE, DFC

Civil Division

- Peter George Betts, CBE – For services to International Climate Change Agreements.
- Katharine Braddick – For services to Financial Services.
- Lindy Elizabeth Cameron, OBE – For services to International Development.
- Sarah Patricia Davidson – For public service.
- Nicholas Lewis Dyer – For services to International Development.
- Tamara Margaret Finkelstein – For public service.
- Philippa Ann Helme – For services to Parliament.
- Noel Henry Lavery – For services to Government in Northern Ireland.
- Ciaran Martin – For services to international and global cybersecurity.
- Indra Suzzanne Morris – For services to Social Mobility.
- Jeremy Mark Pocklington – For public service.
- Susannah Jemima Storey – For public service.
- Clara Jane Swinson – For services to Healthcare Policy
- Catherine Sarah Webb – For public service.
- David Peter Williams – For services to Government Finances.

=== The Most Distinguished Order of Saint Michael and Saint George ===
==== Knight / Dame Commander of the Order of St Michael and St George (KCMG / DCMG) ====
- Philip Barton, CMG, OBE – For services to British foreign policy.

==== Companion of the Order of St Michael and St George (CMG) ====
- Catherine Elizabeth Adams. Director, Government Legal Department. For services to International Law and British Foreign Policy.
- Jonathan Lewis Hall. Lately Foreign Affairs Private Secretary, Prime Minister's Office – For public service
- Scott Livingstone, OBE – For services to British foreign policy.
- Michael John Llams, QC – For services to Gibraltar.
- Rachel Elizabeth Lloyd – For services to supporting victims and survivors of commercial sexual exploitation and trafficking.
- Professor David Hurst Molyneux. Emeritus Professor, Liverpool School of Tropical Medicine – For services to Controlling Neglected Tropical Diseases
- Professor Jamie Patrick Shea – For services to diplomacy and public service.
- John Anthony Tucknott, MBE – For services to British foreign policy.
- Kate Georgina White – For services to British foreign policy.

=== The Royal Victorian Order ===
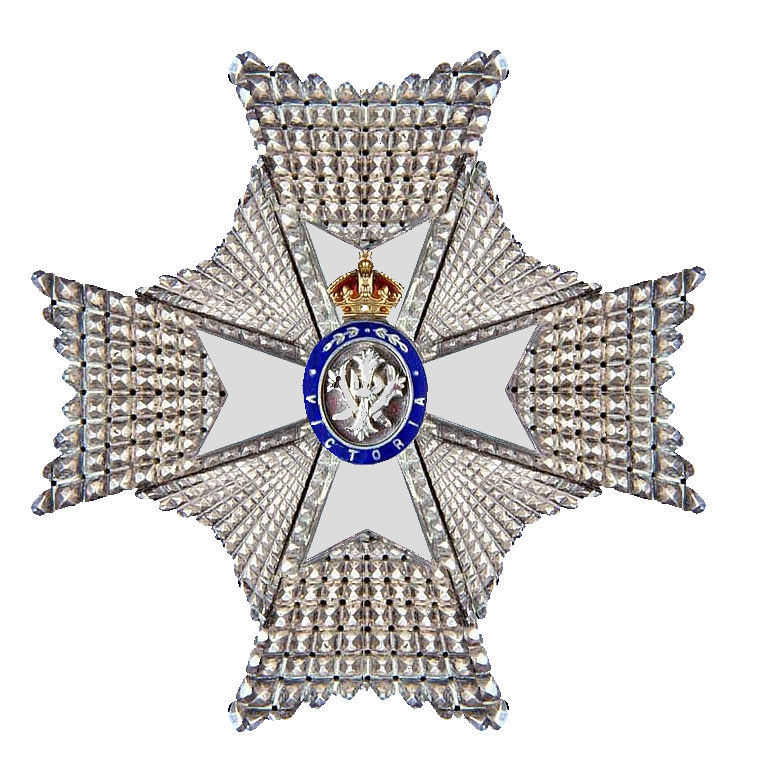
Insignia of a Knight / Dame Commander of the Royal Victorian Order

==== Knight Grand Cross of the Royal Victorian Order (GCVO) ====
- Sir William Richard Michael Oswald, KCVO, National Hunt Racing Adviser.

==== Knight / Dame Commander of the Royal Victorian Order (KCVO / DCVO) ====
- Warren James Smith, JP – Lord Lieutenant of Greater Manchester.
- The Right Honourable Edward Young, CVO – Private Secretary to The Queen.

==== Commander of the Royal Victorian Order (CVO) ====
- Moreen Ruth Anderson – Formerly Trustee, The Duke of Edinburgh's Award.
- The Right Honourable The Lord Rothschild, OM, GBE – For services to The Prince's Council, Duchy of Cornwall.
- The Honourable Kerry Sanderson, AC – Lately Governor of Western Australia.
- Patrick Loudon McIain Stewart, MBE – Lord Lieutenant of Argyll and Bute.
- Jonathan Hall – Lately Foreign Affairs Private Secretary, Prime Minister's Office. For public service.

==== Lieutenant of the Royal Victorian Order (LVO) ====
- Colonel Christopher David Mackenzie-Beevor, CBE – Lieutenant, the Honourable Corps of Gentlemen at Arms.
- Commander Graham Peter Hockley, RN – Lately Corporate Secretary, Corporation of Trinity House.
- Colonel Charles Michael Lake, CBE – Lately Director and Chief Executive Officer, Royal Commonwealth Society.
- Peter David May, MVO – Building Supervisor, Property Section, Kensington Palace.
- Moira McDougall, MVO – Secretary and Personal Assistant to the Resident Factor, Balmoral Estate.
- Richard Ashley Weston Peck – Chief Executive Officer and Secretary, The Royal Warrant Holders Association.
- Alexander John Scully, MVO – Deputy Comptroller, Lord Chamberlain's Office, Royal Household.

==== Member of the Royal Victorian Order (MVO) ====
- Sarah Jane Asquith – For services to the Lieutenancy of the East Riding of Yorkshire.
- Andrew James Barrett – Assistant Accountant, Sandringham Estate.
- Natalie Barrows – Assistant Private Secretary to The Duchess of Cambridge.
- Nicola Jane Christie – Head of Paintings Conservation, Royal Collection, Royal Household.
- Shelagh Ann Cimpaye – Lately Special Adviser and Corporate Secretary, Office of the Governor-General of Canada.
- Melissa Louise Haydon-Clarke – For services to the Royal Household.
- Nichola Colman, RVM – Public Enterprises Administrator, Sandringham Estate.
- Sîan Catherine Cooksey – Senior Collections Information Assistant, Royal Collection, Royal Household.
- Susanna Elizabeth Cross – Senior Programme Manager, Household of The Princess Royal.
- Sergeant Graham Ralph Daly – Metropolitan Police Service. For services to Royalty and Specialist Protection.
- Lee Dobson, RVM – Head Valet to The Prince of Wales.
- Malcolm Douglas Flavell, MBE – For services to the Royal Household.
- Laura Elizabeth Jayne Hobbs – Archivist (Digital), Royal Archives, Windsor Castle.
- Elizabeth Amy Keay – Workshop Manager, C Branch, Master of the Household's Department, Royal Household.
- Debra Mary Livingston – Head of Protocol and Honours, Scottish Government.
- Clara Elisabeth Louise Loughran – Senior Programme Co-ordinator, Household of The Duke and Duchess of Sussex.
- Sergeant David Phillip Newell – Metropolitan Police Service. For services to Royalty and Specialist Protection.
- Mark John Oosman – Manager, Royal Farms, Windsor.
- Jennifer Louise Brooks-Reilyy – Personnel Security Manager, Royal Household.
- Vanessa Elizabeth Remington – Lately Senior Curator of Paintings, Royal Collection, Royal Household.
- Roger Taylor (photographic historian) for services to the Royal Collection
- Jane Thomson – Lately Personal Assistant to the Secretary, The Queen's Body Guard for Scotland, Royal Company of Archers.
- Timothy Andrew Webster – Deputy Clerk to the Lieutenancy of Leicestershire.
- Dorothy So-Mui Wong – Purchase Ledger Assistant, Privy Purse and Treasurer's Office, Royal Household.
- Rachel Woollen – Lately Senior Communications Manager, Royal Collection, Royal Household.

=== Royal Victorian Medal (RVM) ===
Silver – Bar

- Philip Michael Hollister, RVM, Lately Warden, Crown Estate, Windsor
- Graham Passmore STONE, RVM, Lately Horticulturalist, Crown Estate, Windsor

Silver

- Patrick Andrew Bedford, Fire Surveillance Officer, Windsor Castle
- Richard Curtis, Lately Postman, Royal Household
- Stuart Dickson, Lately Fire and Security Office Team Leader, Palace of Holyroodhouse
- Sandra Mary Marshall, Daily Cleaner, Gatcombe Park
- Alan George McDonald, Postman, Royal Household
- Philip Charles Rose, Lately Fire and Security Officer, Palace of Holyroodhouse
- Patrick James Verrenkamp, Senior Patrol Officer, Government House, Queensland
- Dermot Richard Wait, Senior Horticulturalist, Government House, Darwin

=== The Most Excellent Order of the British Empire ===
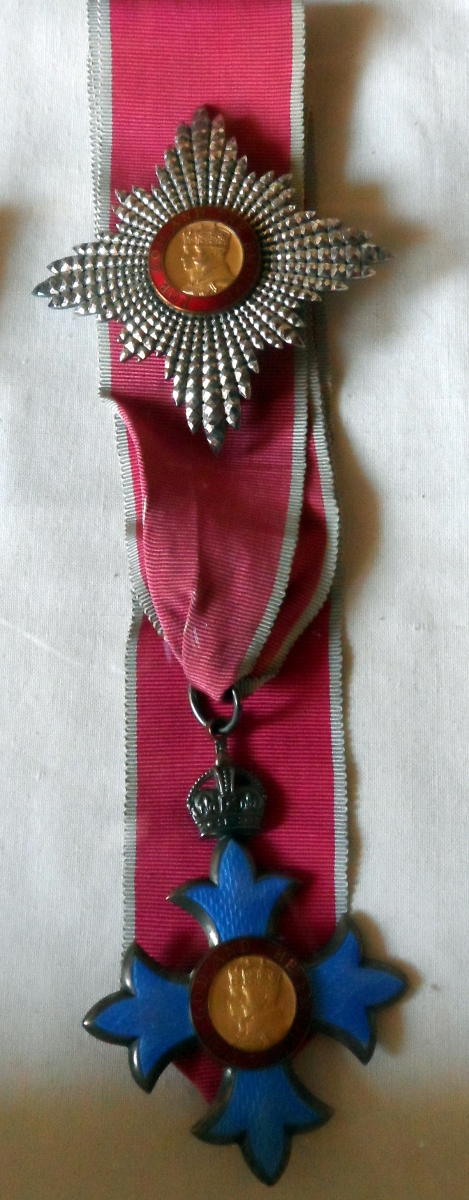
Insignia of a Knight Commander of the Order of the British Empire

==== Knight / Dame Commander of the Order of the British Empire (KBE / DBE) ====
Military Division

- Air Marshal Julian Young, CB, OBE

Civil Division

- Caroline Allen, OBE, Principal and Chief Executive Officer, Orchard Hill College and Academy Trust. For services to Education.
- Floella Karen Yunies, The Baroness Benjamin, OBE, DL – For services to Charity.
- Sue Campbell, Baroness Campbell of Loughborough, CBE, Director of Women's Football, The Football Association. For services to Sport.
- Professor Lynn Faith Gladden, CBE, FRS, FREng, Executive Chair, Engineering and Physical Sciences Research Council. For services to Academic and Industrial Research in Chemical Engineering.
- Teresa Colomba Graham, CBE – For services to Small Businesses.
- Gillian Guy, CBE, Chief Executive, Citizens' Advice. For services to the Public and Voluntary Sectors.
- Donna Langley-Shamshiri, Chairperson, Universal Film Entertainment Group, Los Angeles, United States of America. For services to Film and Entertainment.
- Olivia Newton-John, OBE – For services to Charity, to Cancer Research and to Entertainment.
- Diana Johnson, MP – For charitable and political service.
- Professor Magdalene Anyango Namakhiya Odundo, OBE – For services to Art and to Arts Education.
- Caroline Ann Palmer Yeates, CBE, Chief Executive, Royal Marsden NHS Foundation Trust and National Cancer Director, NHS England and NHS Improvement. For services to Cancer Medicine.
- Professor Lesley Regan, President, Royal College of Obstetricians and Gynaecologists. For services to Women's Healthcare.
- Rose Tremain, CBE – For services to Writing.
- Julia Unwin, CBE – For services to Civil Society.
- Professor Sarah Jane Whatmore, FBA, Professor of Environment and Public Policy, University of Oxford. For services to the Study of Environmental Policy.
- Sharon Michele White, Chief Executive, Ofcom. For public service.

==== Commander of the Order of the British Empire (CBE) ====
Military Division
Royal Navy

- Rear-Admiral Martin Connell
- Commodore Andrew Cree
- Brigadier Matthew Fraser Pierson

Army

- Brigadier Christopher James Bell
- Brigadier Richard Martin Clements

Royal Air Force

Civil Division

- Professor Rowena Arshad, OBE, (Rowena Parnell) Lately Head, Moray House School of Education, University of Edinburgh and Co-Director, Centre for Education for Racial Equality in Scotland – For services to Education and to Equality
- Professor Colin Gareth Bailey, FREng, President and Principal, Queen Mary University of London – For services to Engineering
- Joanna Baker, Lately Managing Director, Edinburgh International Festival and Chair, National Youth Choir of Scotland – For services to the Arts
- Peter Charles Barfoot, Founder and Chairman, Barfoots of Botley – For services to Sustainable Farming
- Professor Julia Mary Black, FBA, (Julia Cross) Professor of Law, London School of Economics and Political Science – For services to the Study of Law and Regulation
- Natalie Ann Black, Lately Deputy Head, No 10 Policy Unit – For public service
- Jennifer Mary Body, OBE – For services to Aerospace Engineering
- Andrew Maurice Gordon Bud, Chief Executive Officer, IProov and Global Chairman, Mobile Ecosystem Forum – For services to Exports in Science and Technology
- Colonel Geoffrey Charles Cardozo, M.B.E., Retired British Army Officer. For services to UK/Argentina relations
- Professor Gordon Lawrence Carlson, Consultant Surgeon, Northern Care Alliance NHS Group – For services to General and Intestinal Failure Surgery
- Victor Lap-Lik Chu, Chairman, First Eastern Investment Group, Hong Kong. For services to Trade and Investment
- Teresa Clarke, Prison Group Director, West Midlands Prison Group, HM Prison & Probation Service – For services to Improving Outcomes for Care Leavers
- Andrea Coscelli, Chief Executive, Competition and Markets Authority – For services to Competitive Markets
- Jonson Cox, Chair, Ofwat – For services to the Water Industry
- Anne Gwendoline Craig – For services to Drama and to Charity
- Paul Geoffrey Crowther, OBE, Chief Constable, British Transport Police – For services to Policing
- Ian Barrett Curle, Lately Chief Executive Officer, Edrington – For services to the Scotch Whisky Industry
- Dr Colin Thomas Currie, MBE – For charitable and political services
- Professor Gareth John Darwin, FBA, Senior Research Fellow, Nuffield College Oxford – For services to the Study of Global History
- Andrew Robert Tudor Davies, AM – For political and public service
- Claire Dove, OBE, DL, Chief Executive, Blackburne House – For services to Social Enterprise
- Gabrielle Anne Edwards, Deputy Director, Chemicals, Pesticides and Hazardous Waste, Department for Environment, Food and Rural Affairs – For services to the Environment
- Professor Barbara Jane Elliott, Professor of Sociology, University of Exeter – For services to the Social Sciences
- Dr Paul Travers Elliot, Lately Deputy Chief Inspector of Hospitals, Care Quality Commission – For services to Mental Health
- Rebecca Jane Endean, OBE, Lately Director of Strategy, UK Research and Innovation – For services to Analysis, Research and Innovation
- Kersten Elizabeth England, Chief Executive, Bradford Council – For services to the Economy and to the community in Bradford
- Dr Ahalia Navina Evans, Chief Executive Officer, East London NHS Foundation Trust – For services to NHS leadership and the Black, Asian and Minority Ethnic community
- Elizabeth Fagan, Chair, D2N2 Local Enterprise Partnership and Non-Executive Chair, Boots UK – For services to Gender Equality in Business
- Dr Kevin John Fewster – For services to Museums and to Maritime History
- Sheila May Flavell, Chief Operating Officer, FDM Group – For services to Gender Equality in IT and to Graduate Employment
- James Earl Fobert – For services to Architecture
- Catherine Mary Fogarty – For services to Parliament
- Paul Foster, Chief Executive Officer, Sellafield Limited – For services to Business
- Peter Geoffrey Freeman – For services to Housing and to Communities
- Colin James Graves, Chairman, England and Wales Cricket Board – For services to Cricket
- Andrew James Green, Lately Chair, Digital Catapult and Chair, Space Sector Council – For services to the Information Technology Sector and to the British Space Industry
- Gillian Margaret Hague, Consultant Researcher and Activist – For services to the Prevention of Violence Against Women and Children
- Alastair David Hamilton, Chief Executive Officer, Invest NI – For services to Economic Development in Northern Ireland
- Katharine Hammond, Director, Civil Contingencies Secretariat – For services to Civil Contingency Planning and National Resilience
- Dr Peter George Hansford, FREng – For services to Innovation in Civil Engineering
- Dr Caroline Hargrove, FREng, Chief Technology Officer, Babylon Health – For services to Engineering
- Christine Hodgson, Chair, Capgemini UK and Chair, The Careers and Enterprise Company – For services to Education
- Adam Ronald Hogg – For charitable and political services
- Claire Ellen Horton, Chief Executive, Battersea Dogs and Cats Home – For services to Animal Welfare
- John Campbell Hudson, Managing Director, Maritime, BAE Systems – For services to the Royal Navy and to Naval Shipbuilding and Design
- Shobana Jeyasingh, MBE, Choreographer and Founder, Shobana Jeyasingh Dance Company – For services to Dance
- Professor Peter David John, Vice Chancellor, University of West London – For services to Higher Education
- Glynne Jones, Director, Office of the Secretary of State for Wales – For public service
- Jack Henry Jones, OBE, Humanitarian Programmes Manager, Department for International Development – For services to the Public and International Humanitarian Sectors
- Professor Jacqueline Margaret Kay, MBE, FRSE, Makar – For services to Literature
- Amanda Melanie Kendall, Director, Trade Remedies, Access and Controls, Department for International Trade – For services to Economic Growth
- Steven Knight – For services to Drama, to Entertainment and to the community in Birmingham
- Professor Aditi Lahiri, FBA, Professor of Linguistics, University of Oxford – For services to the Study of Linguistics
- Cheryl Lamont – For services to Criminal Justice
- Richard Las, Deputy Director, HM Revenue and Customs – For public service
- Helen Kay Lederer, Deputy Director Corporate Services, Prime Minister's Office – For services to Diversity and to Inclusion in the Civil Service
- Professor Alan Robert Lehmann, FRS, Research Professor of Molecular Genetics, University of Sussex – For services to Medical Science, Patients and Families affected by Xeroderma Pigmentosum and Cockayne Syndrome
- Carol Mary Matthews, Chief Executive, The Riverside Group Limited – For services to Social Housing
- Ross Maxwell McEwan, Chief Executive Officer, Royal Bank of Scotland Group – For services to the Financial Sector
- Andrew John McKeon, Chair, The Nuffield Trust – For services to Healthcare
- Stephen Leonard Mear – For services to Dance
- Eoin Morgan, England One-Day International Cricket Captain – For services to Cricket
- Keith Charles William Morgan, Chief Executive, British Business Bank – For services to Small Business Finance
- Mary Jane Fiona (Polly) Neate, Chief Executive, Shelter – For services to Homelessness
- Annie Avril Nightingale, MBE – For services to Radio
- Professor John Ernest Nolan, Lately Chairman, Construction Industry Council and President, Institution of Structural Engineers – For services to Structural Engineering and to the Construction Industry
- Dr Saker Anwar Nusseibeh, Chief Executive Officer, Hermes Investment Management – For services to Responsible Business and to the Financial Sector
- James Richard Parkes, Director, HM Coastguard – For services to Transport
- Damian Dimond Peter Parmenter, Chief of Staff to the Secretary of State for Defence – For services to Defence
- Dr Susan Alison Pember, OBE, Director of Policy and External Relations, HOLEX – For services to Adult Education
- Graham Pendlebury, Director, Local Transport, Department for Transport – For public service
- Professor John Douglas Pickard – For services to Neurosciences, to Neurosurgery and to Research for Patients with Complex Neurological Disorders
- Nina Ann Purcell – For services to Consumer Safety in England, Wales and Northern Ireland
- Dr Joseph Anthony Rafferty, Chief Executive, Merseycare NHS Foundation Trust – For services to Suicide Prevention
- Christopher John Rea, OBE, DL, Founder and Managing Director, AES Engineering Limited – For services to Business, to Innovation and to Exports
- Gillian Reynolds, MBE – For services to Radio
- William Samuel Clive Richards, OBE, DL, Philanthropist – For services to Charity and to the community in Herefordshire
- Thomas Messenger Riordan, Chief Executive, Leeds City Council – For services to Local Government
- Timothy Robinson, Non-Executive Director, Department for International Development – For services to Digital Technology
- Lynette Romeo, Chief Social Worker for England (Adults), Department of Health and Social Care – For services to Social Work
- Sylvia (Syl) Saller, Chief Marketing and Innovation Officer, Diageo – For services to Business and Equality in the Workplace
- Laura Jane Sandys, Chair, Energy Data Taskforce – For services to UK Energy Policy
- Peter Andrew Saville – For services to Design
- Lesley Ann Seary, Lately Chief Executive, Islington London Borough Council – For services to Local Government
- Philip Henry George Sellwood, Chief Executive, Energy Saving Trust – For services to Public Policy on Energy Efficiency
- Dr. Hayaatun Sillem, Chief Executive, Royal Academy of Engineering – For services to International Engineering
- Stephen Slack, Lately Chief Legal Adviser to the Archbishops' Council and the General Synod of the Church of England and Official Solicitor to the Church Commissioners – For services to the Church
- Ruth Elizabeth Sutherland, Chief Executive, Samaritans – For services to Vulnerable People
- Dr. Andrew Dawson Taylor, OBE, FRS, Lately Executive Director of National Laboratories, Science and Technology Facilities Council – For services to Science and Technology
- Paul Pavandeep Thandi, DL, Chief Executive Officer, NEC Group – For services to the Economy
- Michael Anthony Norcott Thompson, OBE, Chief Executive Officer, Childbase – For services to Education and to Philanthropy
- Brendan Threlfall, Lately Deputy Director, Ireland and Northern Ireland, Department for Exiting the EU – For public service
- Rudolph Walker, OBE – For services to Drama and to Charity
- Timothy Alexander Walker, Chief Executive and Artistic Director of the London Philharmonic Orchestra – For services to the Arts and to Music
- Errollyn Wallen, MBE, Composer – For services to Music
- Emma Marion Ward, (Emma Billey) Lately Director, EU Exit Programme, Department for Business, Energy and Industrial Strategy – For services to Government and to the Economy
- Professor Bee Leng Wee, National Clinical Director for End of Life Care, NHS England and NHS Improvement – For services to Palliative and End of Life Care
- Robert Arthur Whiteman, Chief Executive, Chartered Institute of Public Finance and Accountancy – For services to Public Sector Financial Management
- Frances (Mensah) Williams, Chief Executive Officer, Interims for Development – For services to the African community in the UK and Africa
- Brian David Henderson Wilson – For services to Charity and to Business in Scotland
- Kay Withers, Policy Director, Cabinet Office Europe Unit – For public service
- Professor Nicholas Michael John Woodhouse, Emeritus Professor of Mathematics, University of Oxford – For services to Mathematics

==== Officer of the Order of the British Empire (OBE) ====
Military Division
Royal Navy

- Commander Andrew Michael Donaldson
- Commodore Henry Duffy
- Colonel Garth Stuart Cunningham Manger
- Colonel Paul Andrew Maynard
- Captain Michael Alan Salmon
- Commander Daniel Douglas Harold Simmonds
- Captain John Edington Voyce

Army

- Lieutenant Colonel Nicholas David Guise Cowley
- Colonel Michael Terence Duff
- Lieutenant Colonel John Hanson
- Lieutenant Colonel Mark Anthony Harrison
- Acting Colonel David James Kane
- Lieutenant Colonel Thomas Moran
- Lieutenant Colonel Linda Elizabeth Orr
- Lieutenant Colonel Simon Andrew Ridgway
- Lieutenant Colonel Kehinde Adetunji Oluseyi Olajuwon Sorungbe
- Chaplain to the Forces (2nd Class) The Reverend Antony James Feltham-White
- Lieutenant Colonel Tracy Wright

Royal Air Force

- Group Captain Simon Edward Blackwell
- Wing Commander Tracey Bottrill
- Wing Commander Gareth John Burdett
- Wing Commander David James Peter Crook
- Wing Commander Timothy John Rand
- Wing Commander Marcus Edward Allan Stow
- Group Captain Matthew James Stowers

Civil Division

- Dr. Debra Helen Adams, Assistant Director of Infection Prevention and Control, Midlands and East, NHS England and NHS Improvement. For services to Infection Prevention and Nursing.
- James Christopher Adams, Team Leader, Foreign and Commonwealth Office. For services to British foreign policy.
- Ali Akbor, Chief Executive Officer, Unity Housing Association. For services to the community in Leeds.
- Pauline Anderson, Director of Learning and Skills, Derby City Council and Chair of the Trustees of the Traveller Movement. For services to Children and Young People in Education.
- Elizabeth Towns-Andrews, Lately 3M Professor of Innovation, University of Huddersfield. For services to Business, to Enterprise and to Public and Private Sector Collaboration.
- Professor Abdel Ghayoum Babiker, Professor of Epidemiology and Medical Statistics, University College London. For services to Medical Research.
- Dr. Joanne Elizabeth Bailey, Head of Psychology Services, HM Prison and Probation Service. For services to Forensic Psychology, to Offender Rehabilitation and to Public Safety.
- John Patrick Banks. For Government Legal Service.
- Renée James Barclay, Lately Principal Crown Advocate, Special Crime Division, Crown Prosecution Service. For services to Law and Order.
- Professor Karen Louise Barker, Clinical Director for Trauma and Orthopaedics, Oxford University Hospitals NHS Foundation Trust. For services to Healthcare.
- Mirella Magdeleine Bartrip, Lately Director of Dance, Trinity Laban. For services to Dance Education and Training.
- Trevor Harley Bayliss. For services to Cricket.
- Maureen Jane Beattie, Actress and President, Equity. For services to the Entertainment Industry.
- Margaret Elizabeth Beels, Chair, Gangmasters and Labour Abuse Authority. For services to Tackling and Preventing Modern Slavery and Labour Exploitation.
- Shabir Beg, Chair, Scottish Ahlul Bayt Society. For services to Interfaith Relations in Glasgow.
- Carl Jason Austin-Behan For services to Charity, to LGBTQ+ Equality and to the community in Greater Manchester.
- Ronald Bell, J.P., National Chairman, Royal Marines Association. For services to the Royal Marines and to the community in Blackpool.
- Dr. Bikramjit Singh Bhangu, President, South East Asia, Pacific and South Korea, Rolls-Royce and lately, British Chamber of Commerce, Singapore. For services to Trade and British commercial interests.
- Judith Bingham, Composer and Mezzo Soprano. For services to Music.
- Dr. Michael Scott Bingham, Policy Lead, National Planning Policy Framework. For services to Planning.
- Rosemary Jane Black, Lately Service Director, Education and Early Years, Cornwall Council. For services to Education.
- Dr. Martyn James Blissitt, Veterinary Adviser, Animal Health and Welfare, Scottish Government. For services to Animal Health.
- Emma Louise Ann Bourne, Director, EU Exit Domestic and Constitutional Affairs, Department for Environment, Food and Rural Affairs. For services to public administration.
- Juliet Rose Pleydell Bouverie, Chief Executive, The Stroke Association. For services to Stroke Survivors.
- Helen Boyle, Founder and Director, Migrant Children's Foundation, China. For services to vulnerable children in China and UK/China relations.
- Alison Jane Robb Brenchley, Group Director, Nationwide Building Society. For services to Financial Services and to Diversity.
- Christopher David Brereton, Chief Environmental Health Officer, Welsh Government. For services to Environmental and Public Health in Wales.
- Andrew Charles Brown, Secretary and Lately Chief Surveyor, Church Commissioners for England. For services to the Church.
- Professor Ian Hamer Brown, Head of Virology, Animal and Plant Health Agency. For services to Animal Health and Welfare.
- Dr. Victoria Tzortziou Brown, General Practitioner, London Borough of Tower Hamlets and Joint Honorary Secretary, Royal College of General Practitioners. For services to General Practice.
- Andrew Browne, Secretary, Historical Institutional Abuse Inquiry. For services to victims and survivors of abuse.
- Michael Frederick Bullivant, Principal, Zimbabwe Academy of Music and lately Deputy Head, Milton High School, Zimbabwe. For services to Music, to Education and UK/Zimbabwe relations.
- Nicholas John Bunting, Secretary General, RAF Association. For services to Royal Air Force Personnel and Veterans.
- James Gordon Campbell. For services to Healthcare and to the community in Derbyshire.
- Paul Lewis Cann. For services to Combatting Loneliness in Older People.
- Ruth Elizabeth Chapman, Co-Chair, matchesfashion.com. For services to the International Fashion Retail Industry.
- Thomas Watson Chapman, Co-Chair, matchesfashion.com. For services to the International Fashion Retail Industry.
- Dr. Zahid Mehmood Chauhan. For services to Homeless People.
- Dr. Katherine Sarah Chaatwal, Chief Executive, Challenge Partners and Chair, Education at STEP Academy Trust, London. For services to Education.
- Robert Owen Clarke. For services to Broadcasting and Journalism.
- Paul Mukala Monekosso Cleal. For services to Diversity and Inclusion in the Accountancy Profession.
- Colette Cohen, Chief Executive Officer, Oil and Gas Technology Centre. For services to the UK Oil and Gas Industry and to Government Collaboration.
- Rachel Surrethun Coldicutt, Chief Executive Officer, Doteveryone. For services to the Digital Society.
- Ian Charles Cole, Business Development Director, Defence Electronics and Components Agency. For services to Defence.
- Georgina Collins, Lead, Chemical Incident Recovery, Department for Environment, Food and Rural Affairs. For public service.
- Martin Anthony Comer, Departmental Historian. For services to International and Intelligence history.
- Christian Cook, B2, Ministry of Defence. For services to Defence.
- Hilary Cottam, Social Entrepreneur and Designer. For services to the British Welfare State.
- Miles Anthony Coverdale, Lately Private Secretary, Cabinet Office. For public service.
- Duncan Craig, Chief Executive Officer, Survivors Manchester. For services to Male Victims of Sexual Violence and Child Abuse.
- John Roland Cushing. For services to Charity.
- Ian Simon Davidson, Lately Head of Agricultural Policy Division, Scottish Government. For services to Agriculture in Scotland.
- Florence Davida Davies, Head of Director General Office and Policy Profession Lead, Department for Education. For services to Diversity and Inclusion.
- Renuka Priyadarshini Dent (Renuka Jeyarajah-Dent). Director of Operations and Deputy Chief Executive Officer, Coram UK. For services to Children and Families.
- Carol Ann Dewhurst, Chief Executive Officer, Bradford Diocesan Academies Trust. For services to Education.
- Colin John Dick, Deputy Director, EU Exit Strategy Department, Foreign and Commonwealth Office. For services to British foreign policy.
- Alan Herbert Digman, Lately IT Security Officer, Department for Business, Energy and Industrial Strategy. For services to Government Security and to Charity.
- Gerard Donnellan, Deputy Head Operation Resolve, Greater Manchester Police. For services to Law and Order.
- James Arthur Douglass, Police Staff, Metropolitan Police Service. For services to Policing and to National Security.
- Charlotte Dring, Project Lead, Beyond Whitehall Project, Ministry of Housing, Communities and Local Government. For services to Cross Government Social Mobility.
- Fergus John Eckersley, Counsellor, UK Permanent Representation to the European Union, Foreign and Commonwealth Office. For services to British foreign policy.
- Helga Louise Edstrom, Senior Policy Adviser, Department for Digital, Culture, Media and Sport. For public service.
- Dr. Peter David Englander. For services to Charity and to Philanthropy.
- Simon Neville John Everest, Director, Department for International Trade, Defence Security Organisation. For services to International Trade.
- Iain Everett, Head of Delivery for Royal and VIP Protective Security, Office for Security and Counter Terrorism, Home Office. For services to Security.
- Timothy Fallowfield, Director, J Sainsbury and Chair, Disability Confident Business Leaders Group. For services to Disability Awareness.
- Andrew James Falvet, Commercial Director, Driver and Vehicle Licensing Agency. For services to Transport.
- Tracy Fishwick, Founder, Transform Lives Company. For services to Unemployed People in North West England.
- Dawn Rebecca Fitt, Engineering Apprenticeship Training Co-ordinator, Bedford College. For services to Training, to Inclusion and to Diversity in Engineering.
- Timothy Charles Fitzranulf Flear, M.V.O., Lately Her Majesty's Consul General, Milan, Italy and Director Italy, Department for International Trade. For services to Trade and Investment, and British foreign policy.
- John Douglas Foggo, Head, UK Chemical Weapons Convention National Authority, Department for Business, Energy and Industrial Strategy. For services to the Non-Proliferation of Chemical Weapons.
- Jeanette Linda Forbes, Chief Executive, PCL Group. For services to Business, Technology and to Charity.
- Carolyn Fox, Chief Nurse, University Hospitals of Leicester NHS Trust. For services to Nursing.
- Gareth Fox. For political service.
- Ann Porter Francke, Chief Executive Officer, Chartered Management Institute. For services to Workplace Equality.
- Dianne Francombe, Chief Executive, West of England China Bureau. For services to UK/China relations.
- Ann Colette Gallagher. For services to Museums and to Contemporary Art.
- Adrian Richard Gault, Lately Chief Economist, Committee on Climate Change. For services to the Environment and to Tackling Climate Change.
- Christopher William James Gaunt, Executive Chair, British Chamber of Commerce, Turkey. For services to Trade and British commercial interests.
- Hannah Venetia Yusuf-George, Deputy Director, Customs and Borders, Department for Exiting the EU. For public service.
- Alastair George Gibbons, Lately Executive Director for Children's Services, Birmingham City Council. For services to Social Work.
- Jennifer Margaret Gibbs, Principal, KLC School of Design. For services to Higher Education and the Interior Design Industry.
- Sabah Gilani, Chief Executive Officer, Better Community Business Network. For services to Young People and to the Muslim community.
- William Laing Gill, Director, Chair and Honorary Secretary, Royal Highland and Agricultural Society of Scotland. For services to the Agriculture Sector in Scotland.
- Agnes Gillespie, Head, HMRC Payment Card Services. For public service.
- Russell Vivian Goodway, Councillor. For services to Local Government.
- Nishma Gosrani. For voluntary services to Promoting Diversity and Inclusion.
- Dr. Norman Govan, Hazard Management Fellow, Defence Science and Technology Laboratory. For public service.
- James Matthew Graham. For services to Drama and to Young People in British Theatre.
- Virginia Graham, Chief Executive Officer, Renewable Energy Assurance Limited. For services to Promoting Renewable Energy.
- David Anthony Gray, Police Staff, Norfolk Constabulary. For services to Policing and to Child Protection.
- Professor Patrick Francis Gray, Chair, Connswater Homes Limited. For services to Housing in Northern Ireland.
- Dr. Susan Greenhalgh, Consultant Physiotherapist, Bolton NHS Foundation Trust. For services to Physiotherapy.
- Elaine Christine Griffiths, M.B.E., D.L. For services to Heritage and to Charity.
- Andrew David Halls, Head Master, King's College School, Wimbledon. For services to Education.
- William Hampson, D.L., Director, Epiphany Trust. For services to vulnerable people overseas.
- Ruth Mary Hampton. For services to the Lord's Taverners Scotland, Cruse Bereavement Care and to Autism in Scotland.
- John Hannett, Lately Low Pay Commissioner and General Secretary, Union of Shop, Distributive and Allied Workers. For services to the Economy.
- John Healey, Managing Director, Allstate Northern Ireland. For services to the Economy in Northern Ireland.
- Wilma Isobel Erskine-Heggarty, B.E.M., Lately Club Secretary, Royal Portrush Golf Club. For services to Tourism and to Golf in Northern Ireland.
- Peter Haycraft, Founder, Shareholder and Director, Roadtown Wholesale Trading Ltd, British Virgin Islands. For services to the British Virgin Islands.
- Nicholas John Henderson, L.V.O. For services to Horse Racing.
- Dr. David Hewett, Co-founder, Intensive Interaction. For services to People with Special Educational Needs and Disabilities.
- Charlotte Emily Jane Hill, Chief Executive Officer, Step Up To Serve. For services to Young People.
- Olive Paula Hill, Executive Director, Invest Northern Ireland. For services to the Economy in Northern Ireland.
- Helen Holland, Co-Founder, In Care Abuse Survivors. For services to Survivors of Childhood Abuse.
- Professor Philip Howard, Consultant Pharmacist, Leeds Teaching Hospitals NHS Trust and lately National Project Lead, Antimicrobial Resistance, NHS Improvement. For services to Healthcare.
- Jeannette Howe, Head of Pharmacy, Department of Health and Social Care. For services to Pharmacy.
- Dr. Ian Robert Burton Hudson, Lately Chief Executive, Medicines and Healthcare Products Regulatory Agency. For services to Healthcare.
- Angela Jeanette Hughes, Chief Executive, Wales Air Ambulance. For services to Emergency Air Service in Wales.
- Henrietta Sophia Lefanu Seymour Hughes, National Guardian for the NHS and General Practitioner, Brunswick Medical Centre, London Borough of Camden. For services to the NHS.
- Sir Thomas Collingwood Hughes, Bt, Consultant in Emergency Medicine, Oxford University Hospitals NHS Foundation Trust. For services to Healthcare Technology and Information.
- Professor David Hulme, Professor of Development Studies, University of Manchester. For services to Research and to International Development.
- Major Kim Elizabeth Humberstone, Deputy Director, Financial Reporting and Control, Department for Business, Energy and Industrial Strategy. For public service and for services to Young People through the Army Cadet Force.
- Professor Jane Louise Hurst, William Prescott Chair of Animal Science, University of Liverpool. For services to Animal Welfare.
- Matthew Thomas Hyde, Chief Executive, The Scout Association. For services to Young People.
- Kwai Hong Ip, Deputy Specialist Prosecutor, Specialist Prosecutor's Office before the Kosovo Specialist Chambers, The Hague, The Netherlands. For services to International criminal law.
- Joseph David Irvin, Chief Executive, Living Streets. For services to Active Travel and to Charities.
- The Reverend Elizabeth Margaret Jack, Chaplain-in-Ordinary to Her Majesty The Queen and Founder, Richmond's Hope. For services to Bereaved Children and the community in Edinburgh.
- Karen Ruth James, Chief Executive, Tameside and Glossop Integrated Care NHS Foundation Trust. For services to the NHS.
- Dr. Roderick David Jaques, Director of Medical Services, English Institute of Sport. For medical services to Olympic and to Paralympic Sport.
- Julie Jarvis, Head, Commercial Engagement and Development, HM Revenue and Customs. For public service.
- Mark Jenkins, B2, Ministry of Defence. For services to Defence.
- Professor Timothy David Jickells, Member, Science Advisory Council. For services to Marine and to Atmospheric Science.
- Susan Elizabeth Johnson, Lately Head of Safety, Security and Business Resilience, Ministry of Defence. For services to Defence.
- Jade Louise Jones, M.B.E. For services to Taekwondo and to Sport.
- Professor Phillip John Jones. For services to Architecture and to Decarbonisation.
- Andrew Anthony Jowett, Chief Executive Officer, Build It International. For services to Education in Zambia.
- Arundeep Singh Kang. For services to the Development of Black, Asian and Minority Ethnic communities.
- Christopher Noel Kenny, Q.F.S.M., Lately Chief Fire Officer, Lancashire Fire and Rescue Service. For services to the Fire and Rescue Service.
- Rishi Khosla, Chief Executive Officer, OakNorth Bank Limited. For services to Business.
- Nicola Killean, Chief Executive, Sistema Scotland. For services to Music, to Children and to Community Cohesion.
- Lesley Mary Samuel Knox, Lately Chair, V&A Dundee. For services to Culture.
- Neena LaLl, Headteacher, St Stephen's School and Children's Centre, London Borough of Newham. For services to Education.
- Birte Harlev-Lam, Lately Clinical Director, Maternity and Children, NHS Improvement. For services to Maternity and Young People's Care.
- James Nicholas Lambert, Lately Chair and Trustee, IntoUniversity. For services to Social Mobility in Education.
- Susan Kate Lamford, (Kate Flatt). For services to Choreography.
- Helen Louise Lamprell. For services to Business and to Equality.
- Dr. Andrew Jonathan Leach, General Practitioner, Davenal House Surgery, Bromsgrove and Joint Honorary Secretary, Royal College of General Practitioners. For services to General Practice.
- Gabrielle Lee, Governor, HM Prison and Young Offender Institution Low Newton. For services to Prisoners and Their Families.
- Suzanne Lehrer, Senior Lawyer, Government Legal Service. For public service.
- Gary Lightbody. For services to Music and to Charity in Northern Ireland.
- Julie Kamla Lithgow, Director, Institute of Chartered Shipbrokers. For services to Diversity in the Maritime Sector.
- Michael Ernest Charles Lock, Headteacher, Combe Pafford Special School. For services to Children with Special Educational Needs and Disabilities.
- Philip Long. For services to Heritage and to Culture.
- Timothy Losty, Director, Northern Ireland Bureau China. For services to International and Community Relations.
- Camilla Ann Lowther, Founder, CLM. For services to British Fashion and to Photography.
- Struan MacDonald, Assistant Head, Russia and Central Asia, Directorate of Euro-Atlantic Security Policy. For services to Defence.
- Professor Allyson Elaine MacVean, Professor of Policing and Criminology, Bath Spa University. For services to Ethics in Policing.
- David James Maisey, D.L., Co-Chief Executive Officer, ICC Solutions. For services to International Trade and to the Economy.
- Wendy Maisey, Co-Chief Executive Officer, ICC Solutions. For services to International Trade and to the Economy.
- Javad Marandi. For services to Business and to Philanthropy.
- Timothy John Marlow. For services to the Arts.
- Ann Marie Marr, Chief Executive, St Helens and Knowsley Hospitals NHS Trust. For services to NHS Leadership.
- Stephen Martin, D.L., Non-Executive Director, ARCO. For services to Business, to Conservation and to the community in Hull and East Yorkshire.
- Yvonne Mason, Founder and Chair of Trustees, The Mason Trust. For services to Young People in Norfolk and Suffolk.
- Catriona Matthew, M.B.E., European Team Captain, 2019 Solheim Cup. For services to Golf.
- John Clive Cecil May, D.L. For services to Young People.
- Rosemary Frances Mayglothling. For services to Rowing and to Gender Equality in Sport.
- Linda McAvan. For charitable and political services.
- Lyn McDonald, Director, Fraud, Debt and Grants Functions, Cabinet Office. For public service.
- Martin James McElhatton. For services to Disability Sport.
- Professor Gerard Gabriel McGovern, Chief Creative Officer, Land Rover. For services to Automotive Design.
- Professor Maria Louise McHugh, Professor of Organisational Behaviour, Ulster University and lately Dean, Ulster University Business School. For services to Higher Education and Business Development.
- Dr. Helen McKay, Head, Centre for Sustainable Forestry and Climate Change. For services to Forest Science and to Forestry.
- Professor Sheila Ann Manson McLean, F.R.S.E., Professor Emerita of Law and Ethics in Medicine, University of Glasgow. For services to Health and to Education.
- Kim Mears. For services to the Telecommunications Industry.
- Stephen Miley, Director of Children's Services, London Borough of Hammersmith and Fulham. For services to Children and Families.
- Paul Julian Miller, Founder, Managing Partner and Chief Executive Officer, Bethnal Green Ventures. For services to Startup Investment.
- Vaughne Ann Miller, Head of International Affairs and Defence Section, House of Commons Library. For services to Parliament.
- Professor Timothy David Minton, Professor, Keio University, Japan. For services to UK/Japan relations.
- Dr. William Peter Robin Mitchell. For services to Computing and to Artificial Intelligence Education.
- Claude Moraes. For charitable and political services.
- Professor Sadie Anna Morgan, Founding Director, dRMM Architects. For services to the advocacy of design in the built environment.
- Keith John Morris. For services to the Insurance Industry and to Philanthropy.
- Janet Rachel Morrison. For services to Combatting Loneliness in Older People.
- Antonia Moss, Private Secretary to the Cabinet Secretary. For public service.
- Janis Mary Mowlam, Chair, School Aid. For services to Education in South Africa and to Volunteering.
- Dr. Helen Louise Munn, Lately Executive Director, Academy of Medical Sciences. For services to the Advancement of Medical Science.
- Sascha Hilary Wells-Munro, Maternity Improvement Adviser, NHS England and NHS Improvement. For services to the NHS and to Patient Safety.
- Professor Andrew David Neely, FREng, Pro Vice Chancellor for Enterprise and Business Relations, University of Cambridge. For services to Research and to University/Industry Collaboration.
- Paul William Netherton, Deputy Chief Constable, Devon and Cornwall Police. For services to Policing.
- Allison Claire Ogden-Newton, Chief Executive, Keep Britain Tidy. For services to the Environment and to Social Enterprise.
- Paul Frank Nicholls, Jump Racing Trainer. For services to the Horse Racing Industry.
- David Christopher Nieper, Managing Director, David Nieper Limited. For services to UK Manufacturing and to Apprenticeship Development.
- Philippa Nunn, Headteacher, Waldegrave School for Girls and Chief Executive Officer, The Richmond West Schools Trust. For services to Education.
- John O'Neill, Regional Director, Witherslack Group. For services to Children with Special Educational Needs and Disabilities.
- Professor Anne Elisabeth Osbourn, FRS, Professor of Biology, John Innes Centre and Director, Norwich Research Park Industrial Biotechnology Alliance. For services to Plant Science.
- Dr. Ramesh Damji Devji Pattni. For services to Interfaith Relations and to the Hindu community in the UK.
- Barry Raymond Neil Payne, Headteacher and Founder, The Wherry School. For services to Children with Special Education Needs and Disabilities.
- Emma Louise Payne, Deputy Director, International Agreements, Department for Exiting the EU. For public service.
- Andrea Michelle Pearson, Head of International Rail, Department for Transport. For services to Transport.
- Jon Richard Pearson, Warship Support Director, BAE Systems. For services to the Royal Navy.
- Corrienne Peasgood, Principal, City College, Norwich. For services to Safeguarding and to Construction Skills in Norfolk.
- Paul Simon Phillips. For services to Holocaust Education and to Awareness.
- Geoffrey Michael Boyd Pick, Director, London Metropolitan Archives. For services to the Management of Records and Archives in London.
- Professor Emma Lucinda Platt, Professor of Social Policy and Sociology, London School of Economics and Political Science. For services to the Social Sciences.
- Michael Hugo James Plaut. For services to Business and to Entrepreneurship.
- John Mark Poyton, Chief Executive, Redthread. For services to Young Victims of Violence.
- Louise Marie Proctor, Head, National Careers Service. For services to Education and to Careers.
- Paul Benjamin Ramsbottom, Chief Executive, Wolfson Foundation and Wolfson Family Charitable Trust. For services to Charity.
- Taalay Ahmad Qudsi Rasheed, Head of Sanctions Unit and Deputy Director Multilateral Policy, Foreign and Commonwealth Office. For services to British foreign policy.
- Professor Sophie Gilliat-Ray. For services to Education and to the Muslim Community in the UK.
- Graham Gordon Razey, Chief Executive Officer, EKC Group and Member, Principals' Reference Group. For services to Education.
- Kathleen Mary Richardson, Senior Manager, Child Protection Team, National Crime Agency. For services to Law Enforcement.
- Roderick Michael Riddell, Vice-Chairman, the Black Watch Association. For services to Veterans.
- Fiona Elizabeth Rigby, Headteacher, St Catherine's Catholic Primary School, Hallam. For services to Education.
- David Geoffrey Roberts. For services to Aviation.
- Laurie James Russell. For services to Social Enterprise in Scotland.
- Wallace Sampson, Chief Executive, Harrogate Borough Council. For services to Business and to the community in Yorkshire.
- Professor Helen Sang, F.R.S.E., Head of Division, Functional Genetics and Development, The Roslin Institute. For services to Food Security and to Bioscience for Health.
- June Konadu Sarpong, M.B.E., Television Presenter. For services to Broadcasting.
- Michael Warwick Sayers, General Secretary, Commonwealth Association of Law Reform Agencies. For services to promoting law reform and the rule of law.
- John Edward Schluter, Chief Executive Officer, Café Africa. For services to the Coffee Industry and smallholder coffee farmers in Africa.
- James Gregory Sherr, Associate Fellow, Chatham House. For services to British interests overseas.
- Alan Sherry, Lately Principal, Glasgow Kelvin College. For services to Education.
- Philip William Shone, Team Leader, Foreign and Commonwealth Office. For services to British foreign policy.
- David John Shrigley. For services to Visual Arts.
- Nigel Slater, Author and Chef. For services to Cookery and to Literature.
- Osmond Junior Smart, Founder, SOS County Lines Gangs Project. For services to Tackling Gang Violence.
- Professor Alan Smith, UNESCO Chair in Education, Ulster University. For services to Education.
- Paul Anthony Smith, Co-founder and Chief Executive Officer, Ricochet. For services to Technology in Newcastle upon Tyne.
- Nicola Joanne Smith, Legal Counsellor, Foreign and Commonwealth Office. For services to British foreign policy.
- Philippa Kate Elizabeth Spanyol, (Philippa Makepeace), Head, Consular Assistance Department, Foreign and Commonwealth Office. For services to British Nationals overseas.
- Simon James Staughton, D.L. For services to the Brewing Industry and to the community in Cornwall.
- Dr. Anthony Baxter Stevens. For services to Health and Social Care in Northern Ireland.
- Dr. Catriona Anne Stewart, Founder and Chair, Scottish Women's Autism Network. For services to Autistic Women.
- Benjamin Stokes. For services to Cricket.
- Marian Kathryn Sudbury, Director, UK Regions, Department for International Trade. For services to Economic Growth.
- Roger Taylor. For services to Music.
- Richard Teuten, Lately Head of International Financial Institutions Department, Department for International Development. For services to International Development.
- Zoe Thorogood. For political service.
- Elaine Anne Tisdall, Lately Chief Executive, Surrey Care Trust. For services to Adult Learning.
- Mercer Lindsay Todd, Commissioner, Northern Ireland Judicial Appointments Commission. For services to the Justice Sector.
- David Toole. For services to Dance and to People with Disabilities.
- Andrew Trotter, B2, Ministry of Defence. For services to Defence.
- Michael John Tout, Team Leader, Foreign and Commonwealth Office. For services to British foreign policy.
- Jason Don Turner, Founder, iSore Media. For services to People with Substance and Criminal Justice Issues.
- Edward François Vainker, Co-Founder and Executive Principal, Reach Academy, Feltham. For services to Education.
- Barbara Anne Vest, Special Advisor, Energy UK. For services to the Energy Industry.
- Professor Timothy Rutland Walsh. For services to Microbiology and International Development.
- Mark Andrew Warburton, Chief of Operations Iraq, Optima. For services to Security.
- Katherine Georgina Louise Ward, L.V.O., H.M. Ambassador, Quito, Ecuador. For services to British foreign policy.
- Matthew Ward, Programme Manager, Ministry of Defence. For services to Defence.
- Professor Ian Weeks, Dean of Clinical Innovation, School of Medicine, Cardiff University. For services to * Knowledge Transfer and to Medical Innovation.
- Christopher Wheatley, Chief Executive Officer, The Flying High Trust, Nottingham. For services to Education.
- Graham Harry Wilkinson, Senior Manager, Equality, Interventions and Operational Practice Group, HM Prison and Probation Service. For public service.
- Sue Wilkinson, M.B.E. For services to Literature and to Public Libraries.
- Alexander Williams, Deputy Director, Sector Deals, Department for Business, Energy and Industrial Strategy. For services to Economic and to Industrial Development.
- Owen Almando Williams, Chief Executive, Calderdale and Huddersfield NHS Foundation Trust. For services to Healthcare in West Yorkshire.
- David Willis, Lately Senior Finance Business Partner, Child Support Agency. For services to Public Finance.
- Juliet Wright, Headteacher, Bankfoot Primary School, Bradford. For services to Families and Children.
- Charles Alan John Yates, Head of Threat Leadership, Insights, Partnership and Delivery, National Crime Agency. For services to Law Enforcement.

==== Member of the Order of the British Empire (MBE) ====
Military Division
Royal Navy

- Warrant Officer Class 1 Engineering Technician (Communications Information Systems Submarines) David Kevin Annan
- Warrant Officer 2 Brian Dent
- Commander Justin Hains
- Acting Captain Mark Hankey
- Commander Andrew Barry Perks
- Commander Justin Robert Ernest Saward
- Acting Commander Suzanna Jane Seagrave
- Warrant Officer Class 1 Engineering Technician (Marine Engineering) Nicholas Richard Sharland
- Colour Sergeant Samuel Sheriff
- Lieutenant Janice Spicer
- Lieutenant Commander Adam James Spike

Army

- Major Christopher David Ayes
- Sergeant Guy Fitzroy Oronde Lowe-Barrow
- Warrant Officer Class 1 Nigel Vincent Black
- Major Jason William Buckley
- Captain Patrick William Burgess
- Major Daniel Laurence Krase-Harder Calthorpe
- Warrant Officer Class 1 Jamie Donovan Clarke
- Captain Christopher Edward Crompton
- Major Christopher John Deed
- Acting Major Joanne Eccles
- Captain Nigel Stuart Gardner
- Lieutenant Colonel James Ronald Murray Gower
- Major Michael Green
- Sergeant Saroj Gurung
- Major Benjamin Thomas Hawes
- Lieutenant Colonel Mark Kevin Hunter
- Major Ashley Jeyes
- Major Emma Claire Jude
- Major Steven Keir
- Major Stephen Lord
- Captain Colin Macnab
- Captain Shaun William Major
- Major Richard Graham Marsh
- Lieutenant Colonel Richard James McCord
- Staff Sergeant Craig John McDougall
- Captain Christopher Graham McRobbie
- Major Jonathon Edward Moore
- Captain Alexander Morrison
- Major Maikali William Nawliva
- Major Jolyon Ashton Patrick
- Warrant Officer Class 2 Andrew Mark Pick
- Major Stephen Richard Roberts
- Major David James Robinson
- Sergeant Emma Kay Smith.
- Lieutenant Colonel Simon James Stevenson
- Captain Luke William Townsend
- Sergeant Jonathan Ian Whitmore
- Lieutenant Colonel Derren Mark Battersby-Wood
- Corporal Jemma Tracy Young

Royal Air Force

- Squadron Leader Howard Robin Bailey
- Squadron Leader Roger Charles Beech
- Flight Sergeant Michelle Claire Crolla
- Warrant Officer Marie Cross
- Squadron Leader Andrew Lawrence Clive Edgwell
- Sergeant Daryl William Gordon
- Flight Lieutenant Thomas Edward Patrikc
- Flight Lieutenant Christopher John Stradling

Civil Division

- Joanna Tufuo Abeyie. For services to Diversity in the Media and Creative Industries.
- Keith Wynn Adams, Headteacher, Lochaline Primary School. For services to Education and to the community in Lochaline, Argyll and Bute.
- Yewande Modupe Mayomi-Akinola, Principal Engineer, Laing O'Rourke. For services to Engineering and to Diversity in Science, Technology, Engineering and Mathematics (STEM) Design and Innovation.
- Royston Stephen Eric Aldwin, Lately Volunteer and Outreach Manager, Hertfordshire Fire and Rescue Service. For services to the voluntary sector.
- Mohamed Ashraf Ali, Head of Projects, British Muslim Heritage Centre. For services to Community Relations.
- Mumtaz Ali, Work Coach, Sparkhill Jobcentre Plus, Department for Work and Pensions. For services to Disadvantaged Customers in Birmingham.
- Jane Audrey Allen, Chief Executive, British Gymnastics. For services to Gymnastics.
- Tracey Allen. For charitable and political services.
- David Ian ALSTON. For services to the Arts.
- Cerian Angharad. For services to Science Promotion and to Engagement with Young People.
- Mark Edward Apsey, Director, Ameresco. For services to Sustainable Energy.
- Martin Graham Austin, Managing Director and Founder, Nimbus Disability. For services to Accessibility in the Tourism and Entertainment Sectors.
- Professor Adisa Azapagic, FReng, Professor of Sustainable Chemical Engineering, University of Manchester. For services to Sustainability and Carbon Footprinting.
- Stephen James Backshall. For services to Charity and to Wildlife Conservation.
- Helen Elizabeth Baden Policy Lead for Professional and Business Services, Department for Business, Energy and Industrial Strategy. For services to Diversity and Inclusion and to the Industrial Strategy.
- Paul William Barnard, Town Planner, Plymouth City Council. For services to Planning in Plymouth.
- Ruth Emma Clara Louise Barnett. For services to Holocaust Education and Awareness.
- Diana Lindsey Batchelor, Principal and Chief Executive, Abingdon and Witney College. For services to Further and Adult Education.
- Jean Battle. For charitable and political services.
- Elizabeth Frances Beech, (Elizabeth Armstrong). National Project Lead, Antimicrobial Resistance, NHS England and NHS Improvement. For services to Public Health.
- Francis Vincent Benali, Volunteer and Ambassador, Cancer Research UK. For services to Cancer Patients in the UK.
- William Bergman. For services to Holocaust Education and Awareness.
- Mohammad Saqib Bhatti, President, Greater Birmingham Chamber of Commerce. For services to Diversity and to Inclusion in Business Communities.
- Professor Kalwant Bhopal, Race Equality Champion. For services to Equality in Education.
- Vivien Ann Frances Bickham, Lately Knowledge Hub Adviser, SafeLives. For services to Victims of Domestic and Sexual Abuse.
- Jill Marian Bignell, Founder, Educate Peru. For services to Children and Families in Lima, Peru.
- Horace (Harry) Raymond Billinge. For services to Charitable Fundraising.
- Elaine Margaret Billington, Lately Chair, North West Apprenticeship Ambassadors Network. For services to Apprenticeships and to Young People in North West England.
- Wendy Shorter-Blake. For services to Upholstery.
- Michael John Blower. For services to the community in Farnham, Surrey.
- Dominic James Boddington, Founder, Respect4us and lately Vice Principal, Open Academy. For services to Alternative Education in Norfolk.
- Barbara Kay Böhm, Governor, Chaigeley School, Warrington. For services to Education in the UK and East Africa.
- Paulette Veronica Bolton, Advanced Nurse Practitioner, Enki Medical Practice, Birmingham. For services to Patient Care.
- Robert David Boyd. For services to the Arts and to the community in Northern Ireland.
- Professor Leslie Baruch Brent. For services to Holocaust Education.
- Christopher Bridgman. For services to the community in Wolverton and Milton Keynes, Buckinghamshire.
- Nicola Louise Brindley, Work Coach, Work Services Directorate, Department for Work and Pensions. For services to Victims of Domestic Violence in Nottingham.
- Mark Patrick Brookes, Campaigns Adviser, Dimensions. For services to People with Learning Disabilities and Autism.
- Diana Elizabeth Brooks. For services to Charity and to Young People.
- Polly Anne Frances Brooks, Founder and Director, Dan's Fund for Burns. For services to People with Burn Injuries.
- Stephen Brown, Officer in Charge, Joint Casualty, Compassionate and Commemorative Centre, Ministry of Defence. For services to Armed Forces Personnel.
- Thomas Johnston Brown, Pipe Band Drummer and Instructor, Boghall and Bathgate Caledonia Pipe Band. For services to Scottish Traditional Music.
- Emily Florence Brunt. For voluntary service to Education and the community in the West of Northern Ireland.
- Felicity Anne Bryan, Literary Agent. For services to Publishing.
- Gordon John Buchanan, Cinematographer and Presenter. For services to Conservation and to Wildlife Film-making.
- Nicholas Brendan Buckley, Founder and Chief Executive Officer, The Mancunian Way. For services to Young People and to the community in Greater Manchester.
- Aileen Buckton, Lately Executive Director for Community Services, Lewisham Borough Council. For services to Social Care.
- Constable Graham Colin Budd, South Wales Police. For services to Community Policing in Cardiff.
- Jenifer Burden. For services to Education.
- Peter Kenneth Burke, Voluntary Education Adviser, Historic Houses. For services to Heritage Education.
- Maureen Elizabeth Burnett, Co-founder, Ethiopian Medical Project. For services to Healthcare in Ethiopia.
- David Burns, Author. For services to Children and Young People with Autism.
- Dr. Eileen Burns, President, British Geriatrics Society and Consultant in Elderly Medicine, Leeds Teaching Hospitals NHS Trust. For services to Integrated Healthcare for Older People.
- Raymond Michael Burrows. For services to the Ulster Aviation Society, to Heritage Sector and to the community in Northern Ireland.
- Marcus William Burton, Non-Executive Director, Yamazaki Mazak. For services to Exports and Inward Investment.
- John Butler, Lately Chair of Governors, Furness College. For services to Further Education.
- Carolyn Butlin, Middle Manager, Essex Community Rehabilitation Company. For services to Probation and to Community Safety.
- Razia Butt, Independent Education Adviser, Birmingham City Council. For services to Education.
- Joseph Charles Buttler. For services to Cricket.
- Joanne Cable, Nurse Team Manager, Hereford Garrison. For services to Military Personnel and Families.
- Linda Pauline Ann Caddy, Foster Carer, Hampshire County Council. For services to Children.
- Robert Frederick Caddy, Foster Carer, Hampshire County Council. For services to Children.
- Colonel Patrick Cairns, D.L., Chief Executive, St George's Police Children's Trust and Police Treatment Centres Charities. For services to Police Charities.
- Professor John Lennox Campbell, Professor of General Practice and Primary Care, University of Exeter. For services to General Practice.
- Maureen Winifred Campbell. For services to Fostering in County Tyrone.
- John Ireland Blackburne Cannon. For services to the British Cobnut Industry.
- Scott Christopher Cawley, National Diabetic Foot Coordinator for Wales. For services to People with Diabetes.
- Sally Chakawhata, Policy and Programme Officer, Department for International Development. For services to International Development and to HIV Policy.
- John Chapman. For services to the community in Marlow, Buckinghamshire.
- Leslie Sebastian Charles. For services to Music.
- Aziza Chaudry, Quality Manager, Adult Education Wolverhampton. For services to Education.
- Craig Vincent Chettle, Chief Executive, Confetti Media Group. For services to Entrepreneurship and the Creative Industries Sector.
- Daisy Rose Christodoulou, Director of Education, No More Marking. For services to Education.
- Alistair Clarke, Chair, Social Enterprise Solutions, Blackpool. For services to Social Enterprise in Lancashire.
- Yvonne Clarke, Managing Director, Pathways Community Interest Company. For services to Innovation and to the community in North West England.
- Francis Stephen Clayton, Chair, Yorkshire and the Humber Apprenticeship Ambassador Network. For services to Apprenticeships.
- Catherine Hannah Cleary, Founder and Director, First Steps ED. For services to People with Eating Disorders.
- Mete Coban, Founder and Chief Executive, My Life My Say. For services to Young People.
- Graham Edward Coldman. For services to the community in Edenbridge, Kent.
- Peter Colenutt, Lately Chair, Education Building Development Officer's Group. For services to Education.
- Nichola Sarah Connell, Nutrition Technical Director, Eleanor Crook Foundation. For services to Emergency Nutrition Crises Abroad.
- John George Copland. For services to Agriculture and to the rural community in Scotland.
- Elizabeth Cornford. For services to Young People and to the community in South Lakes, Cumbria.
- Rebecca Mary Cornish, Founder, Trustee and African Correspondent, Accomplish Children's Trust. For services to Children with Disabilities in Africa.
- Philip Edward Corrick. For services to the Hospitality Industry. Jayne Louise COWAN. For political and public service.
- Jacquelynn Forsyth Craw, Managing Director, Offshore Pollution Liability Association Limited. For services to Arts, to Education and to Business in Scotland.
- Dr. Brian Crossley. For services to the Craft of Chair Caning.
- Vivien Anne Currie, Chief Executive, Hamilton Park Racecourse. For services to Racecourse Management, to Business and to Charity in Hamilton, Lanarkshire.
- Graham Gifford Curtis. For services to the community in Dorchester, Dorset.
- Neil Cussen, Police Staff, Thames Valley Police. For services to Policing and to Forensic Science.
- Neil Andrew Dallen, Councillor, Epsom and Ewell Council. For services to Local Government and to Young People.
- Dr. Abdirisak Dalmar, Director, Al-Nur Eye Hospital. For services to People with Disabilities in Somalia.
- Lisa Dancer, Adult Education Quality Manager. For services to Adult Learners with Mental Health Issues in the London Borough of Hillingdon.
- Manjit Darby, Director of Nursing Leadership and Quality, Midlands, NHS England and NHS Improvement. For services to Nursing and to Patient Care.
- David Davies. For services to the Manufacturing Sector in South Wales.
- Councillor Philip Davis, Heritage Champion, Birmingham City Council. For services to Heritage.
- Paula Marie Dawson, Deputy Principal, Finance and Governance Manager, Northern Ireland Executive. For services to Public Inquiries in Northern Ireland.
- Andrew Robert Day. For services to the community in Portscatho, Cornwall.
- The Very Reverend David Delargy. For services to Music and to Charity in Northern Ireland.
- Winifred Mary Dignan, Lately Chair, North West Ambulance Service NHS Trust. For services to Healthcare in North West England.
- Judith Diment. For services to Charity.
- Captain Guy Fraser Disney. For services to Horse Racing, to Polar Expeditions and to Veteran's Charities.
- Caroline Domanski, Chief Executive Officer, No1 Copperpot Credit Union. For services to Financial Inclusion.
- Linda Lorraine Dominguez, Head of Safeguarding, St John Ambulance. For services to St John Ambulance.
- Air Vice Marshall Simon Robert Charles Dougherty, Trustee, RAF Benevolent Fund. For services to RAF Personnel and Veterans.
- Archibald Dryburgh, Councillor, Dumfries and Galloway Council. For services to Local Government and to the Armed Forces.
- Captain Iain Christopher Dunderdale, Invergordon Lifeboats Operation Manager. For services to the community in the Scottish Highlands.
- Loren Dykes. For services to Women's Football in Wales.
- Dr. Naomi Eales, Operations Officer, National Crime Agency. For services to Law Enforcement.
- Anne Elliot, Head of Childcare Services, Bonnyrigg After School Club, Midlothian. For services to Out of School Care.
- Jill Marion Elson. For political and community service in Exmouth, Devon.
- Elizabeth Anne Evans, Lately Stoma Nurse, University Hospitals of Derby and Burton NHS Foundation Trust. For services to Nursing.
- Mark Everett, Director, Marlowe Theatre, Canterbury, Kent. For services to Theatre.
- Esther Temitope Fajoye, Team Leader, London Borough of Camden. For services to Children and Young People.
- Kathryn Anne Farrington, Special Educational Needs and Disabilities Coordinator, Drighlington Primary School, Leeds. For services to Children and Young People.
- Julie Rose Farrow, Project and Policy Adviser, Civil Nuclear Security and Safety, Department for Business, Energy and Industrial Strategy. For services to Diversity and Inclusion.
- Mary Ferguson, Consultant Midwife, Betsi Cadwaldr University Health Board. For services to Midwifery in Wales.
- Tania Findlay, Teacher, St Newlyn East Learning Academy. For services to Education.
- Heidi Lorraine Fisher, Founder, Make an Impact Community Interest Company. For services to Innovation in Social Enterprise and to Impact Measurement.
- Dr. Olanike Adefemi Folayan, Co-founder, Association for Black and Minority Ethnic Engineers UK. For services to Diversity in Engineering.
- Ann Marie Ford, Lately Head of Hospital Inspections, Care Quality Commission. For services to Patient Safety.
- Maureen Rose Ford. For services to Cancer Patients and to Charitable Fundraising.
- Robert Melville Fowler, Counter Terrorism Strategy Liaison Officer, Highlands and Islands, Police Scotland. For services to Law and Order.
- Dr. Melrose Fraser, (Melrose Stewart). Lecturer in Physiotherapy, University of Birmingham and lately Vice President, Chartered Society of Physiotherapy. For services to Physiotherapy.
- Andrew Robert Freeburn, Chief Superintendent, Police Service of Northern Ireland. For services to Policing and to the community in Northern Ireland.
- Arantxa Jona Ibarloza Gaba, Co-ordinator, Kensington and Chelsea Citizens' Advice. For services to the community in North Kensington, London.
- Susan Gahan, Nursery Principal, Zebedee Nursery School, South West London and Volunteer, Steward's Trust. For services to Education.
- Fiona Elizabeth Gale. For services to Heritage in Wales.
- Daniel Joseph Galvin. For services to Young People and to Charity.
- Maksud Ahmed Gangat, Director of Education, Al Risalah Education Trust. For services to the Muslim community and Interfaith in South London.
- Brian Patrick Gardner, Lately Member, British Association of Spinal Cord Injury Specialists. For services to People affected by Spinal Cord Injuries.
- Sandra Marie Garlick, Business Consultant, Woman Who. For services to Women in Business in the West Midlands.
- Lynne Janetta Garwood, Nurse Consultant, Cwm Taf Morgannwg University Health Board. For services to Mental Healthcare and to Nursing in Wales.
- Sonia Gharyal, Policy Lead, Office of Security and Counter Terrorism, Home Office. For services to National Security.
- Adeline Marie Odile Claude Ginn, Founder, Women in Rail. For services to the Rail Industry.
- Shakuntla Gittins, Foster Carer, London Borough of Ealing. For services to Children.
- Jane Marian Goldingham, Lately Head of Operational Development, and Principal Social Worker, East Sussex County Council. For services to the Social Work Profession.
- Natalie Gordon, Team Manager, Control Centre, TfL. For services to Transport and the community in London.
- Natasha Delia Letitia Gordon, Actor. For services to Drama.
- Anne Margaret Stuart Grant. For services to Charity in Bedfordshire. Maria Beate GREEN. For services to Holocaust Education.
- Virginia Mary Greenwood. For services to Charity.
- Robert Grice, Lately Member, British Hallmarking Council. For services to Hallmarking Law.
- James Grieve, Lately Joint Artistic Director, Paines Plough. For services to Theatre.
- Roger Griffith. For services to Diversity and to the Arts.
- Derek Griffiths. For services to Drama and to Diversity.
- Helen Grime, Composer. For services to Music.
- Serena Monique Guthrie, England Netball Captain. For services to Netball.
- Anthony Patrick Hadley. For charitable services to Shooting Star Chase Children's Hospice Care.
- David Haire, Project Director for Fundraising, Hull University Teaching Hospitals NHS Trust. For services to Patients and Staff in East Yorkshire.
- John Paul Hajdu, Holocaust Survivor. For services to Holocaust Education and Commemoration.
- Tracy Helen Pringle Hamilton, Director, Mash Direct. For services to the Northern Ireland Agri-Food Sector.
- Lynn Christine Hammersley. For services to Gymnastics, to Fitness and to the community in the Forest of Dean, Gloucestershire.
- Michele Ann Oxley Hammond. For services to Elite Sport.
- Paul Joseph Harbard. For services to Innovative Housing Delivery in London and to Charity.
- Ainsley Denzil Dubriel Harriott. For services to Broadcasting and to the Culinary Arts.
- Joanne Elizabeth Harten, England Netball Player. For services to Netball.
- Dr. Rachel Hartnell, Director, FAO Reference Centre for Bivalve Mollusc Sanitation, Centre for Environment Fisheries and Aquaculture Science. For services to Animal Health and Welfare.
- Hatice Hasan, Founder and Chief Executive Officer, Stopcocks. For services to Women in the Heating and Plumbing Industry.
- Parveen Hassan, Inclusion and Community Engagement Manager, Crown Prosecution Service. For services to Community Engagement, Inclusion and Equality.
- Professor Edward Hawkins, Professor of Climate Science, University of Reading. For services to Climate Science and to Science Communication.
- Kelly Hegarty, E1, Ministry of Defence. For services to Defence.
- Annette Julia Henley, Lead Engineer for Infrastructure, National Communications Data Service, Home Office. For services to Raising Awareness of Mental Health Issues.
- Andrea Christina Hider, Foster Carer, Amicus Foster Care. For services to Children and Young People in Bristol, Bath and North East Somerset.
- Andrew Holt, J.P. For services to Young People and to the community in Leicestershire and Rutland.
- Mindu Margaret Hornick, Holocaust Survivor. For services to Holocaust Education and Commemoration.
- Angela Horsley, Head of Children, Young People and Transition, NHS England and NHS Improvement. For services to Children's Healthcare in the NHS.
- Professor John Paul Howarth, Deputy Chief Executive, North Cumbria Integrated Care NHS Foundation Trust and lately General Practitioner, Cockermouth, Cumbria. For services to General Practice.
- The Very Reverend Dr. David Michael Hoyle, Lately Dean, Cathedral Church of the Holy and Undivided Trinity, Bristol. For services to Faith and to vulnerable communities in Bristol.
- Aaron William Hughes. For services to Football.
- Christl Anne Hughes. For services to Equality and to Charity.
- Professor Elizabeth Ann Hughes, Lately Regional Director of Education and Quality, Health Education England and Consultant, Sandwell and West Birmingham Hospitals NHS Trust. For services to Healthcare Education and Training.
- Maureen Alyson Hughes, Foster Carer, Leeds City Council. For services to Children and Young People in Leeds.
- William George Hughes, Foster Carer, Leeds City Council. For services to Children and Young People in Leeds.
- Simon Graham Hunter, Chief Executive Officer, Hunter Apparel Solutions Limited. For services to Business and the Economy.
- Arif Hussain. For services to the Muslim Community in the UK and Abroad.
- Nadiya Hussain. For services to Broadcasting and to the Culinary Arts.
- Karen Jayne Hutchinson, Head, Northern Ireland Security Guard Service. For services to Defence.
- Timothy John Hutchinson. For voluntary services to Football on North Tyneside.
- George Richard Hyde. For services to the community in Ramsey, Cambridgeshire.
- Shelly Dawn James, Volunteer Carer Supporter. For services to Kinship Care.
- Mark Arthur James Jardine, Funeral Director, Jardine Funeral Directors Limited and Roucan Loch Crematorium Company Limited. For services to the community in Dumfries and Galloway.
- Nadeem Hassan Javaid. For services to Community Cohesion and to Young People.
- Vicky Jeffers, Group Partnership Manager, North West Group Partnership Team, Work Services Directorate, Department for Work and Pensions. For services to the Armed Forces.
- Martin Frank Jewell. For services to Business Start Ups and to Charity in Enfield, London.
- Michael Kuldip Johal, Director, Johal, Munshi and Co. Limited. For services to the Economy and to Community Cohesion.
- Antonia Johnson. For services to the Arts and to the community in County Fermanagh.
- Elizabeth Jones. For services to Rugby League Football and to Charity.
- Louise Emma Joseph (Dreda Say Mitchell). Author. For services to Literature and Educational Work in Prisons.
- Karl Ashley Jones, Founder and Executive Chair of Trustees, Senior Citizen Liaison Team. For services to Charity and to Older People in South West England and South Wales.
- Wilfred Emmanuel-Jones. For services to British Farming.
- Fiona Margaret Kalache, Manager, Mid Argyll Youth Development Services. For services to Young People in Mid Argyll.
- Dr. Sudarshan Kapur. For services to Interfaith Understanding and to the community in East London.
- Carolyn Reneson Keen, Chair of Governors, Westminster Adult Education Service. For services to Adult Education and to the community in London.
- Roseann Kelly, Chief Executive Officer, Women in Business. For services to Economic Development in Northern Ireland.
- Charles Richard Kennard, Co-Founder and Principal, East London Arts and Music. For services to Youth Music.
- Joanne Kenny, Assistant Headteacher, Ashton on Mersey School, Greater Manchester. For services to Education.
- Alison Kentuck, Receiver of Wreck, Maritime and Coastguard Agency. For services to Salvage and Underwater Heritage.
- Richard Anthony Kerslake. For services to Education and to the Arts in the London Borough of Sutton.
- Anthony Stuart Kirkham. For services to the Royal Botanic Gardens, Kew and to Arboriculture.
- Lady Jill Ingram Kirkwood, Founder and Chair, Daisy Chain Trust. For services to Charity.
- Gordon Thomas Knight, Planning and Risks Manager, Department for Business, Energy and Industrial Strategy. For public service and to Mental Health Awareness.
- Alan Philip Eric Knott. For services to Cricket.
- Angela Margaret Knowles, Honorary President and Fundraiser, Bloodwise. For services to Blood Cancer Research.
- Professor James Colville Laird, Director of Education and Medical Director, British Association of Immediate Care Schemes Scotland. For services to Pre-Hospital Emergency Care.
- Angela Vivien Paula Lamport, President for London and Tiffany Circle Ambassador, British Red Cross. For services to the Red Cross.
- Amanda Lane, Team Leader, Department for Transport. For services to Transport.
- Simon David Lane. For services to the community in Cheshire.
- Amy Leonard, Founder, Transformation Trust. For services to Young People and to Education.
- Jean Leonard. For services to Music and to the community in Orkney.
- Lilian Kathleen Levy. For services to Holocaust Survivors.
- Donna Louise Lewis, Foster Carer, Derbyshire County Council. For services to Children.
- Roy Christopher Lewis. For services to Financial Inclusion.
- Sarah Ward-Lilley. For services to Journalism.
- Linda Susan Ling, Managing Director, Fleximobility and Secretary General, Wheelchair Accessible Vehicle Converters' Association. For services to People with Disabilities.
- Gabrielle Nicole Logan. For services to Sports Broadcasting and to the Promotion of Women in Sport.
- Elizabeth Jane Lonsdale, Head of Corporate Governance and Secretary to the Board, HM Treasury. For voluntary and public service.
- Robin John Love. For services to the Maritime Sector and to the community in Plymouth.
- Nanette Elizabeth Lovell. For services to Young People and to the community in Northampton.
- Sharon Lovell. For services to Children and Young People.
- Angela Lynam, Playgroup Leader, Kindertee Community Playgroup, Derrylin. For services to Education.
- Elizabeth Ann Lynch. For services to Art and to Culture.
- Professor Francis Ronald Lyons, Associate Dean for Research and Impact, Ulster University. For services to Higher Education and to Music.
- Ludwig Victor Macaulay. For voluntary service to the community and the Firefighters' Charity.
- Keith Sinclair MacKiggan, UN Reform Lead, Department for International Development. For public service.
- Kay Louise Maddieson, Northern Ireland Office. For public service in Northern Ireland.
- Richard Andrew Main. For services to the Charitable Sector.
- Anthony Granville Mallin. For services to Young People through Sport.
- Charles Gareth Roe Manny, Lately Chair, Campaign Board, Francis Crick Institute Appeal, Cancer Research UK. For services to Charity and to People with Cancer.
- Teresa Manning, Chief Executive Officer, Clockwise Credit Union. For services to Financial Inclusion, to the Credit Union Movement and to the community in Leicestershire.
- Rhian Mannjngs, Founder, 2 Wish Upon A Star. For charitable services.
- George Robert Marsh, T.D., Vice Lord-Lieutenant of the West Midlands. For services to the community in the West Midlands.
- Carole Martin, (Carole Thomas). Pay and Reward Specialist, HM Revenue and Customs. For services to Pay and People Management.
- Dr. Mahiben Maruthappu, Co-Founder and Chief Executive Officer, Cera. For services to Health and Social Care Technology.
- Sheku Kanneh-Mason, Cellist. For services to Music.
- Laura Jane Massaro. For services to Squash.
- Professor William Michael Mawhinney, T.D., Lately Head, Medicines Regulatory Group. For services to Pharmacy, to Medicines Regulation and to Public Safety.
- Caroline Gillian Mawhood, Non-Executive Director, Debt Management Office. For services to the Economy.
- Alexander May. For services to the Doric Language, to Culture and to Heritage in the North East of Scotland.
- The Very Reverend Stephen Patrick McBrearty. For services to Criminal Justice.
- Dr. David Alastair McDonald, National Lead for Enhanced Recovery, Scottish Government. For services to Healthcare.
- Bridget Fiona McIntyre, Founder, Dream On and the Blossom Charity. For services to Women.
- Dr. Michael Gerard McKillop. For services to Disability Awareness and to Athletics in Northern Ireland.
- Margaret Rose McKinlay, Lately Captain, 1st Lochwinnoch Company. For services to the Girls' Brigade.
- Philip McLaughlin, Lately Branch Manager, Strathfoyle Library. For services to the community in Northern Ireland.
- Professor Dr. Jane Melton, Lately Director of Engagement and Integration, 2gether NHS Foundation Trust. For services to Mental Health and to People with Learning Disabilities.
- Dr. David Michael. For services to the community in Greater London.
- Josephine Middlemiss, Co-founder, Ethiopia Medical Project. For services to Healthcare in Ethiopia.
- Barry Middleton. For services to Hockey.
- Yvonne Ann Millard, Deputy Chief Nurse, Paediatrics, Birmingham Women's and Children's NHS Foundation Trust. For services to Paediatric Nursing.
- Nigel James Miller, Head of Therapies, Learning Disabilities Services, Hywel Dda University Health Board. For services to People with Learning Disabilities.
- Carl Darren Mitchell, Foster Parent, Blackpool Council. For services to Children and to Young People in Blackpool.
- Diane Marie Mitchell, Foster Parent, Blackpool Council. For services to Children and to Young People in Blackpool.
- Rebekah Louise Mitchell, Executive Personal Assistant, Environment Agency. For services to HIV Awareness.
- Dr. Nalini Jitendra Mocha, General Practitioner, Thistlemoor Medical Centre, Peterborough. For services to the NHS.
- Jennifer Diane Monk, Head of Education, Clayfield House. For services to Vulnerable Young People.
- Gordon Moore, Chief Executive, Blyth Star Enterprises. For services to Mental Health and to People with Learning Difficulties in Northumberland.
- Anna Mary Morgan, Director of Nursing and Quality, Norfolk Community Health and Care NHS Trust. For services to Nursing.
- David Morgan. For services to Weightlifting.
- Dr. Lynn Mary Morgan, Lately Chief Executive Officer, Arthur Rank Hospice. For services to the community in Cambridgeshire.
- Richard Henry Morgan. For services to the community in Harlow, Essex.
- Gillian Henrietta Morton, General Manager and Head of Midwifery, Women and Children's Directorate, NHS Forth Valley. For services to Healthcare.
- David Pearson Muir. For services to Racehorse Welfare.
- Yvonne Mulholland, Principal, Presentation Primary School, Portadown. For services to Education.
- Eileen Rose Mullan. For voluntary service in Northern Ireland.
- Carolyn Ann Murray, Founder, Immanuel Kindergarten Charity. For services to Education in South Sudan.
- Kanti Nagda. For services to Charity in the UK.
- Eva Neumann. For services to Holocaust Education.
- Michael Nicholas. For services to Rugby League in Wales.
- Ciara Angela Nicholl, Administrative Officer, Enniskillen Jobs and Benefits Office. For services to Bereaved Families in the UK and Ireland.
- Thomas Niven, Shipbuilding Lead Manager, Queen Elizabeth Class, Babcock Marine. For services to Naval Shipbuilding.
- The Reverend Eugene Damien O'Hagan. For services to Music and to Charity in Northern Ireland.
- The Reverend Martin O'Hagan. For services to Music and to Charity in Northern Ireland.
- Kim O'Neill, Paralegal Officer, Special Crime Unit, Crown Prosecution Service. For services to Law and Order.
- Chukwuemeka Emmanuel Anyiam-Osigwe, Founder and Chairman, British Urban Film Festival. For services to the Black and Minority Ethnic Film Industry.
- Judith Rose Palmer. For services to Dance.
- Kevin Parkinson, Lately Chief Finance Officer and Director of Governance, Morecambe Bay Clinical Commissioning Group. For services to the NHS in Lancashire and South Cumbria.
- Claire Caroline Pashley, Music Teacher and Chief Examiner, Victoria College Examinations. For services to Children and Young People with Special Educational Needs and Disabilities.
- Yogesh Patel. For services to Literature.
- Yusuf Patel, Community Engagement Coordinator, Redbridge Borough Council. For services to Community and Interfaith Cohesion in the London Borough of Redbridge.
- Susan Jane Paterson. For services to the community in North East Scotland.
- Harry Fotios Paticas, Creator and Architect, Stairway to Heaven Memorial. For services to the community in Bethnal Green, London Borough of Tower Hamlets.
- Michelle Rose Paul, Chair of Trustees, Turn Around. For services to Literacy and Numeracy.
- Professor Jeremy David Pearson, Associate Medical Director, British Heart Foundation and Chair, Sclerodema and Reynaud's UK. For services to Medical Research.
- Nicolette Jennifer Kemp Peel, Co-founder and lately Chair of Trustees, Mummy's Star and Midwife, Tameside and Glossop Integrated Care NHS Foundation Trust. For services to Women with Cancer during Pregnancy.
- Deborah Ann Pennington, Higher Executive Officer, Office for Security and Counter Terrorism, Home Office. For services to Mental Health Awareness.
- Stephen James Penny, Team Member, Tweed Valley Mountain Rescue Team and Wellbeing Officer, Scottish Mountain Rescue. For services to Mountain Rescue.
- George Perrin, Lately Joint Artistic Director, Paines Plough. For services to Theatre.
- Nicola May Roche Perrin, Lately Head, Understanding Patient Data, Wellcome Trust. For services to Science.
- Kathleen Mary Perry. For services to the community in Staffordshire.
- David Michael Phillips. For services to Charitable Fundraising.
- Barry Picken. For services to the community in Wolverhampton and the West Midlands.
- Kathleen Agnes Picken, Music Teacher, Dumfries and Galloway Council. For services to Music, to Education and to Charity.
- The Reverend Canon Michael Pilavachi, Founder, Soul Survivor. For services to Young People.
- Verna Pollard, Foster Carer, Plymouth City Council. For services to Children.
- Teresa Porter, Headteacher, Riccarton Early Childhood Centre. For services to Education and to the community in Kilmarnock.
- Rodney Stanley Powell, Lately Chair, Thomas Pocklington Trust. For services to Blind or Visually Impaired People.
- Michael John Prendergast, Singer and Founding Member, The Searchers. For services to Music.
- Sally Louise Preston, Founder and Managing Director, Kiddylicious. For services to Entrepreneurship.
- Michelle Proudman, Lead Nurse for Community Health in North Manchester, Manchester University NHS Foundation Trust. For services to Community Nursing.
- Andrea Pull, Founder, Conservative Spring Lunch. For political service.
- Jane Claudia Pyman, Lately Consultant Physiotherapist, University Hospitals Bristol NHS Foundation Trust. For services to Orthopaedic Surgery, to Physiotherapy and to Rehabilitation in Paediatrics.
- Dr. Tara Quasim, (Tara Quasim-Shah). Clinical Co-Lead, InS:PIRE. For services to People with Post Intensive Care Syndrome.
- Jasvir Kaur Rababan. For services to the Sikh community.
- Mohammed Tariq Rafique. For services to the community in Greater Manchester.
- Baljinder Singh Rai. For services to Parliament.
- Sean David Ramadan, Founder and Chief Executive, Ramsden International. For services to International Trade.
- Professor Gerrard Rayman, Consultant Physician, East Suffolk and North Essex NHS Foundation Trust. For services to Diabetes Care.
- Rose Reilly. For services to Women's Football.
- Lesley Richardson, J.P., Private Secretary to Director General Resources, Defence Equipment and Support. For services to Defence.
- Jennifer Rodgers, Chief Nurse, Children, Neonates and Young People, NHS Greater Glasgow and Clyde. For services to Healthcare.
- Rebecca Ingrid Rogerson, Director, My Sisters Place and Wearside Women in Need. For services to Victims of Domestic Violence.
- Joseph Edward Root, England Test Cricket Captain. For services to Cricket.
- Alasdair Mackenzie Ross, Skiing Instructor. For services to Skiing.
- Janice Ross. For services to small and medium-sized enterprises and to the community in North East England.
- Catherine Louise Ryan, Community Matron, Sole Bay Health Centre and Founder, Sole Bay Care Fund. For services to Nursing and to Fundraising in Suffolk.
- Sukwinder Kaur Samra, Headteacher, Elmhurst School and Director, Elmhurst TSA. For services to Education.
- Susan Margaret Samson, Chief Executive Officer, University of Chichester Multi-Academy Trust. For services to Education.
- The Honourable Michael John Samuel, Chair, Anna Freud Centre. For services to Young People and to Mental Health.
- Kevin Michael Saunders, Hampshire Constabulary and Search and Rescue Volunteer. For service to Policing and to the community in Hampshire and the Isle of Wight.
- Jill Scott. For services to Women's Football.
- Marilyn Scott. For services to Arts, to Culture and to Heritage in Woking, Surrey.
- Peter John Scott. For voluntary service to the National Trust at Wightwick Manor, Wolverhampton.
- Martin John Semple, Nursing Officer Patient Experience, Chief Nursing Office, Welsh Government. For services to Nursing.
- Dr. Adeela Ahmed Shafi, Reader in Education, University of Gloucestershire. For services to Social Justice in Bristol.
- Catherine Shipman, Lately Student Activities Coordinator, Southern Regional College. For services to Students and Young People in County Down and County Armagh.
- Gertrude Silman, Life President, Holocaust Survivors Friendship Association. For services to Holocaust Education.
- Manjulika Singh. For services to Yoga, to Health and to the Community.
- Carol Anne Slater, (Carol Boswarthack). For services to Libraries.
- Brian Charles Smith, Teacher and Founder, R.E.A.L Education. For services to Young People with Special Educational Needs and Disabilities.
- David Adrian Smith. For services to Reversed Glass Ornamental Artistry.
- Robert Paul Smith, Director, Active Hands Company Limited. For services to International Trade and to People with Disabilities.
- Martin Jeremy McKay-Smith, Training Principal, Crown Prosecution Service. For services to Law and Order and to Legal Training.
- Paul Andrew Smyth. For services to Disability Inclusion and to Financial Services.
- William John Snoddy. For services to the voluntary and community sector in Northern Ireland.
- Kelly Jade Sotherton. For services to Track and Field Athletics and to the Promotion of Women's Sport.
- George Soutar. For services to the conservation of Native Aberdeen Angus Cattle.
- Emma Southard, Diary Manager to Cabinet Secretary. For public service.
- Emma Southern, Manager, Talent Match Project, Princes Trust, Leicestershire. For services to Unemployed Young People.
- Peter George Sowray. For services to the community in North Yorkshire.
- Elizabeth Stafford. For services to Girl Guiding.
- Yolande Davina Stanley. For service to Young People in the Hospitality Industry.
- Cassandra Stavrou, Chief Executive Officer, Propercorn. For services to the Food Industry and to Exports.
- Hugh McInnes Steele, Lately Headteacher, The Dales Special School, Northumberland. For services to Children and Young People with Special Educational Needs and Disabilities.
- Jennifer Stevenson, Senior Officer, National Safeguarding and Modern Slavery, Border Force, Home Office. For services to Preventing Modern Slavery.
- Kenneth Walter Stradling. For services to the Arts in Bristol.
- Professor David Tinsley Strange. For services to Music.
- Timothy Streatfeild. For services to Charity.
- Menna Sweeney, Headteacher, Ysgol Plascrug, Aberystwyth. For services to Education.
- Gregory Thomas Swift, Chair, Quarry Bank Community Association. For services to the community in Skelmersdale, West Lancashire.
- Dr. Timothy Charles Ayrton Tannock, Lately Member of the European Parliament for London. For political service to International Relations and Human Rights.
- Raymond Tapken, J.P. For services to Young People.
- Andrew Donald Tapley. For services to Hockey.
- Colin Barrie Taylor, Headteacher, Newbattle Community High School. For services to Education and to the community in Midlothian and East Lothian.
- Joanne Taylor, Founder and Director, Reach and Rescue. For services to Safeguarding.
- Sandra Ann Taylor, Lead Ophthalmic Research Nurse, Royal Liverpool and Broadgreen University Hospitals NHS Trust. For services to Nursing and to Eye Research.
- Giles Terera, Actor and Musician. For services to Theatre.
- Ruth Terry, Head of Service, Children's Social Work, Leeds City Council. For services to Children and Families.
- John Thompson, Chair, Thompsons of Prudhoe. For services to the Economy and to the community in Northumberland.
- Rosemary Thompson, Head of Events, The Not Forgotten Association. For services to the Armed Forces community.
- Craig Alexander Thomson, Founder, Craig Thomson Scholarship Award. For services to Football and to Charity in Scotland.
- Gina Alison Tiller, Lately Chair, North Cumbria University Hospitals NHS Trust. For services to Healthcare in Cumbria.
- Colin Simpson Todd, Fire Safety Consultant. For services to Fire Safety.
- Jiemin Tomita. For services to the Chinese community in Northern Ireland.
- Catherine Sandra Tomlin, Sustainable Business and Development Manager, Environment Agency. For services to the LGBTQ+ community.
- John Topping, C1, Ministry of Defence. For services to Defence.
- Richard Douglas Tuffrey. For services to Heritage.
- Dominique Karon Unsworth, B.E.M. For services to Apprenticeships.
- Kerry Wade, Leader, Gwent Missing Children's Hub. For services to the Protection of Vulnerable Children.
- Elizabeth Anne Grant Wallace, Lately Chief Executive, AVENUE. For services to Counselling, to Family Mediation and to Psychological Support.
- Paul Waller, C1, Ministry of Defence. For services to Defence.
- Michael John Egerton Walmsley, Greater Manchester Police. For services to Policing.
- Peter Derek Walters, Training Manager, WorldSkills UK. For services to the WorldSkills Competition.
- Kowkhyn Wan, Television Presenter. For services to Fashion and to Social Awareness.
- Melanie Ann Weatherley, Co-founder and Chief Executive, Walnut Care at Home and Chair, Lincolnshire Care Association. For services to Social Care.
- Roy Alexander Weise, Director. For services to Drama.
- Professor Eyal Weizman. For services to Architecture.
- Barrie John Wells, Founder and Chair, Barrie Wells Trust. For services to Seriously Ill Children.
- Professor Julia Mary West. For services to Radioactive Waste Management.
- John White, Director, Southwark Construction Skills Centre. For services to the community in South London.
- Nicola Michelle Whiting, Chief Strategy Officer, Titania. For services to International Trade and to Diversity.
- David Wilbraham, Force Chaplain, Thames Valley Police. For services to Policing.
- The Right Reverend Rose Josephine Hudson-Wilkin. For services to Young People and to the Church.
- Patricia Wilkinson, Senior Officer, HM Revenue and Customs. For services to Diversity and Inclusion.
- Dr. Jason Weng Leong Wong, General Dental Practitioner, The Maltings Dental Practice, Grantham, Lincolnshire. For services to Dentistry and to Oral Health.
- Alan Woods, Chairman, Woods River Cruises. Ltd, Co-founder, Thames Clippers. For services to River Travel.
- Emma Jane Worley, Co-Chief Executive Office and Co-Founder, The Philosophy Foundation. For services to Innovation.
- Catriona Ann Worthington, Director, Westminster House Youth Club. For services to Children and Young People in South East London.
- Angela Wright, Foster Carer, Wakefield Metropolitan District Council. For services to Children in Wakefield.
- Mathew Wright, Co-Founder, Barnsley Youth Choir. For services to Music and to Young People.
- Marion Shearer Yool, D.L. For voluntary service in Moray. David Chattan Tross YOULE. For services to Local History.
- Professor James Yu, Future Networks Manager, SP Energy Networks. For services to the Electricity Supply Industry and to Innovation.
- Janet Zamornii, Senior Executive Officer, Work Services Directorate, Department for Work and Pensions. For services to Deprived Communities in London.
- Ione Lavinia Margaret Zatloukal. For public, political and parliamentary services.

Diplomatic Service and Overseas

- Sanam Naraghi-Anderlini, Co-Founder and Executive Director, International Civil Society Action Network. For services to International peacebuilding and Women's Rights.
- Adisa Azapagic
- Stephen John Ballinger, Operations Manager, Cleared Ground Demining, Palau. For services to UK/Palau relations.
- Elizabeth Anne Beattie, Secretary, Oxford University Society, Victoria, Australia. For services to education and UK/Australia relations.
- Dr. Charles Betty, Charity and Community worker in Spain. For services to British Nationals overseas.
- Janet Deborah Borastero, Chairperson, Gibraltar Disability Society, Gibraltar. For services to disabled people Community in Gibraltar.
- Robert Cashmore, Head of Investment, British Embassy Riyadh, Saudi Arabia. For services to Trade and Investment.
- Charles Edison Clifford, Director, Customs and Border Control, Cayman Islands.
- Mark Lawrence Collins, First Secretary, UK Permanent Representation to the European Union, Foreign and Commonwealth Office. For services to British foreign policy.
- Robert Owen Cooper, Desk Officer, Foreign and Commonwealth Office. For services to British foreign policy.
- Ann Catherine Cormack, Member of the Foreign and Commonwealth Office Audit and Risk Assurance Committee. For services to the Foreign and Commonwealth Office.
- Davina Mary Crole, International Media Officer, Press Office, Foreign and Commonwealth Office. For services to British foreign policy.
- Michael Lawrence Cullen, Country Director, Control Risks Colombia. For services to the British business community in Colombia.
- Lorraine Elizabeth De Matos, Chief Executive Officer and General Manager, Cultura Inglesa São Paulo, Brazil. For services to UK/Brazil cultural relations and the British Community in São Paulo.
- Christopher Mark Dottie, President, British Chamber of Commerce, Spain. For services to British business in Spain.
- Annette Ellis, Desk Officer, Foreign and Commonwealth Office. For services to British foreign policy.
- Edgar Victor Garrett, Desk Officer, Foreign and Commonwealth Office. For services to British foreign policy.
- Yvonne Grant, Founder, Open Arms Development Centre, Jamaica. For services to providing resettlement services to returned migrants in Jamaica.
- Philippa Ruth Greenwood, Tunisia Memorial Lead, Crisis Management Department, Consular Directorate, Foreign and Commonwealth Office. For services to British Nationals overseas.
- Kolbassia Haoussou, Lead Survivor Advocate and Survivors Speak OUT Network Coordinator at Freedom From Torture. For services to survivors of torture and sexual violence in conflict.
- John Gwyn Jones, Board Member of Panyathip International School, Laos and Chief Executive Officer of the Federation of British International Schools in Asia. For services to British Education overseas.
- Neale Robert Jones, Consular Regional Operations Manager, British Embassy Baku, Azerbaijan. For services to British Nationals overseas.
- Peter Ronald Oliver Jones, British Consular Warden, Livingstone, Zambia. For services to UK/Zambia relations.
- Kelvin Anthony Ernest Lay, Lately Contractor at the United Nations Office Drugs and Crime, Nairobi, Kenya. For services to Child Protection in Kenya.
- Natalie Ann Lockwood, Desk Officer, Foreign and Commonwealth Office. For services to British foreign policy.
- Kelly Anne Mason, Lately Vice Consul, British High Commission Nairobi, Kenya. For services to British Nationals overseas.
- Stacy Roger Mather, Director, Youth Empowerment Project, British Virgin Islands. For services to the community and youth in the British Virgin Islands.
- David McAllister, Country Director, Tearfund UK, Democratic Republic of Congo. For services to alleviating poverty in Central Africa.
- Thomas McKinley, Lately Team Leader, Foreign and Commonwealth Office. For services to British foreign policy.
- James Matthew McLaughlin, Head, EU Exit Negotiations and Engagement Team, Foreign and Commonwealth Office. For services to British foreign policy.
- Robert James Douglas McRobbie, Chief Executive Officer, Hong Kong Rugby Union, Hong Kong. For services to Philanthropy and UK/Hong Kong relations.
- Wilfred Edward Oldham, 1st Battalion, The Border Regiment. For services to commemorations and UK/The Netherlands relations.
- Mark Howard Petrie, Honorary Consul, Denia, Spain. For services to British Nationals overseas.
- Richard John Powell, Senior Trade and Investment Officer, Department for International Trade, New York, USA. For services to Trade and Investment.
- Neil Robert Rudge, Desk Officer, Foreign and Commonwealth Office. For services to British foreign policy.
- Jillian Dede Tay, Vice Consul, British High Commission Accra, Ghana. For services to British Nationals overseas.
- Dennis Gladwin Tucker, Chief Executive Officer, Hotel Pension Trust, Hamilton, Bermuda. For services to the Community in Bermuda.
- Bruce Walker, Chief Air Transport Officer, Independent provider to World Food Programme, Nigeria. For services to humanitarian operations overseas.
- Ashley Charles Wheater, Mary B Galvin Artistic Director, The Joffrey Ballet Chicago, United States of America. For services to the Performing Arts.
- David Anthony Williams, Trustee and Council Member for Malawi, Royal Commonwealth Ex-Services League. For services to Commonwealth veterans.

=== Royal Red Cross ===
==== Members of the Royal Red Cross (RRC) ====
- Commander Ian Christopher Kennedy

==== Associate of the Royal Red Cross (ARRC) ====
- Warrant Officer Class 2 Emma Jane Jolliffe
- Squadron Leader Scott Joseph Fitzgerald

=== British Empire Medal (BEM) ===
- Ali Abdi. For voluntary service to the Black, Asian and Minority Ethnic community in Cardiff.
- David Andrew Ainslie. For services to the community in Uppingham, Rutland.
- Michael Robert Alazia, Self-employed farmer and Charity fundraiser, the Falkland Islands. For services to Charity and fundraising in the Falkland Islands.
- Elizabeth Louise Alderton, Community Nurse Team Lead and Queen's Nurse, North East London NHS Foundation Trust. For services to Nursing.
- Margaret Allan. For services to Curling.
- June Anderson. For services to Tenants Rights and to Law and Order in Clackmannanshire.
- William John Armstrong, Reserve Constable, Police Service of Northern Ireland. For services to Policing.
- Rayburn Bainbridge, Volunteer Cricketeer, ICC Cricket World Cup 2019. For services to Sport.
- Margarita Sweeney-Baird, Founder and Chair, Inclusive Skating. For services to Skating.
- Jeffrey Baker. For services to the community in Consett, County Durham.
- Kerry Louise Banks, Fundraiser and Charity Ambassador, Breast Cancer Now. For services to Breast Cancer.
- John Barclay. For services to British Road Cycling.
- Rachel Barnett. For services to Holocaust Education and Awareness.
- Suzanne Barnley, Founder, Help4Harry. For voluntary and charitable service.
- Anthony David Ernest Bateson, Volunteer and Trustee, Stroud Court Community Trust and Founder, County Air Ambulance Trust. For services to Health charities and to People with Autism.
- Christopher John Beadle. For services to the community in Old Basing and Basingstoke, Hampshire.
- Sandra Berriman. For services to the community in Liss, Hampshire.
- Harold Joseph Binyon, Volunteer. For services to the Fire Fighters' Charity and to Crook Athletics Club, County Durham.
- Kathryn Helen Bispham, Clinical Governance Coordinator, Kent and Medway NHS and Social Care Partnership Trust. For services to Patient Safety.
- Margaret Jeanette Blackman, Parish Councillor. For services to the community in Walton-on-Trent.
- The Right Reverend Alvin Blake. For services to the community in Luton, Bedfordshire.
- Martha Rosalind Elizabeth Bloomfield. For services to the community in Northern Ireland.
- James Charles Macaulay Both. For services to Charity and to the community in Devon and Somerset.
- Francelle Andrée Bradford. For voluntary and charitable services.
- Morgan James Britton, Volunteer. For services to the Fire and Rescue Service and to the community in Bristol.
- Hilda Broadbent, Care Assistant, Royley House Care Home. For services to Older People and to Dementia Care.
- Vanessa Elizabeth Brown, Administrative Assistant, Voluntary Returns, National Removal Command Immigration Enforcement, Home Office. For services to the community in Birmingham.
- Stephen Douglas Buff, Desk Officer, Foreign and Commonwealth Office. For services to British foreign policy.
- Margaret Bumphrey. For services to the community in Briston, Norfolk.
- Betty Burgess, Volunteer, Las Palmas, Spain. For services to British Nationals overseas.
- Pauline Janet Burns. For services to the community in Knottlingley, West Yorkshire.
- Peter George Burrows. For services to the community in Brighton, East Sussex.
- Jeanne Bush. For services to the community in Chippenham, Wiltshire.
- Valerie Cadd, Chair of Governors, St John's CE Academy, Darlington and Leader and Commissioner, Girlguiding UK. For services to Education.
- Nicholas Paul Cann. For services to Stroke Survivors and to the Stroke Association, Wales.
- Andrew Carroll, Senior Executive Officer, Department for Environment, Food and Rural Affairs. For voluntary service.
- Leslie Alan Carswell. For voluntary service to Scouting in Northern Ireland.
- Robin Paul Carter. For services to Choral Music.
- William Joseph Carter, Chair, Lydiate Mencap and lately Chair, South Sefton Mencap. For services to Disabled and Vulnerable People.
- Bryan Owen Anthony Catchpole, Cadet Administrative Assistant, Devon Army Cadet Force. For services to Young People.
- Gary Robert Chambers, Head of Estates and Facilities Management, South Eastern Regional College, Northern Ireland. For services to Education.
- Grenville George Chappel. For services to the community in Penwerris, Falmouth.
- Roger Lloyd Chase. For voluntary service to the community in Sidcup.
- Dhruv Mansukhal Chhatralia. For services to Hinduism and to Developing Young People.
- Beverley Ann Chidley. For services to Brownies and Girlguiding.
- Francis James Clement. For services to Athletics in Scotland.
- Julian Pell-Coggins, Metropolitan Police Service. For services to Young People in Enfield.
- Renate Collins. For services to Holocaust Education.
- Keith Vincent Cook, Cricket Operations Manager, Warwickshire County Cricket Club. For services to Cricket.
- Catherine Marie Cooke. For services to Libraries.
- Veronica Catherine Corben, Chair, Winslow Big Society Group. For services to the community in Winslow, Buckinghamshire.
- Mary Adams Corkum, Building Supervisor, Ballywalter Primary School. For services to Education.
- Pamela Jane Corry. For services to the community in Harpurhey, Manchester.
- Cyril Rodney Cottrell. For services to Charity and to the Royal National Lifeboat Institution.
- Shirley Ann Court. For services to Children's Singing in North West England.
- Peter Thomas Craig. For services to the community in Whickham, Newcastle upon Tyne.
- Sara Louise Crawford, Inspector, Employment Agency Standards Inspectorate, Department for Business, Energy and Industrial Strategy. For services to Mental Health Awareness.
- Susan Ann Croall. For services to Music in Swansea.
- Jill Crossland. For services to Sport and to the community in Tintwistle, Derbyshire.
- Florence Ethel Cummins. For services to the community in Alford, Cheshire.
- Margaret Roslyn Davidson. For services to MacMillan Cancer Support in Northern Ireland.
- Llinos Ann Davies. For services to Music in South Wales.
- Christopher John Day. For services to Adaptive Skiers.
- Maria Piedad Reguera del Rio. For services to Libraries.
- Christine Margaret Delivett, Volunteer Team Leader, Open Door Drop-In Centre. For services to Mental Health Awareness.
- Kishan Rajesh Devani. For services to community cohesion.
- Eric Mordue Dickson, Lately Chair, Blyth and District Talking Newspaper. For services to Blind and Visually Impaired People in South East Northumberland.
- Sokphal Din. For services to Holocaust Education.
- James Duncan. For voluntary service in Forres, Moray.
- Arthur William Dyke, Box Maker, Chief Tour Guide and Workforce Representative, Lady Haig's Poppy Factory. For services to Poppyscotland.
- Dr. Sheena Ritchie Dykes, D.L. For services to Homeless People in High Wycombe.
- William Joseph Eames. For services to the Royal Air Force and to the community in Enniskillen, County Fermanagh.
- Roger David Earp, Founder, Shuktara Trust. For services to vulnerable children in India.
- Andrew Peter Spencer Ebben. For services to Lifeguard Development and to Swimming Pool Safety.
- Doris Sybil Edwards. For services to People with Cystic Fibrosis.
- Jane Rachael Edwards. For services to the community in Nottingham.
- Richard Frank Elam, Director, Evora Construction. For services to Business and to the community in York.
- Brian Charles Ellam. For services to Music.
- Jane Ellison. For services to the Arts, Media and to Public Libraries.
- George Edward Evans. For services to Table Tennis in Wales.
- David Lewis Lloyd-Evans. For services to the community in Y Fron, Wales.
- William Richard John Ezekiel. For voluntary service to Surf Life Saving GB.
- James William Murray Fairbairn. For services to the community in Northern Ireland.
- Marianne Alison Louis Fairman. For services to the community in Boston, Lincolnshire.
- Deborah Farrar, Protecting Vulnerable People Investigator, South Wales Police. For services to Policing.
- Gisela Feldman. For services to Holocaust Education.
- Frederick Ivor Ferguson. For services to the community in Londonderry.
- The Reverend John Henry Fieldsend. For services to Holocaust Education.
- Patricia Joan Finch. For services to People with Disabilities.
- Katharine Lesley Maddock Fisher, Chair, Little Discoverers, West Norfolk School for Parents, King's Lynn. For services to Children with Disabilities and Their Families.
- Kenneth Harry Forrest. For services to Sport and to Young People in Birmingham.
- Angela Elizabeth Forster, Service Manager, Community Hubs, Libraries and Parks, Newcastle City Council. For services to Public Libraries.
- Joseph Eric Foster. For services to the community in Golborne, Greater Manchester.
- Grace Friar. For services to the community in Berwick-Upon-Tweed, Northumberland.
- Mark Frost, Community Projects Manager, Glamorgan County Cricket Club and Development Manager, Cricket Wales. For services to Cricket.
- Kathryn Mary Fulton. For services to the community in the London Borough of Barnet.
- Michael John Armand Gaillard, Producer and Director, Stage Aid. For charitable services.
- Thomas Harold Gardiner. For services to Business, to Employment and to the community in Belfast.
- Bryan Garnham. For services to Fundraising and to the community in Bury St Edmunds, Suffolk.
- Luc David Ludovicus George, Senior Security Officer, UK Permanent Representation to the European Union. For services to security and UK/Belgium relations.
- Georgina Ann Gibbons, Teacher, Shrewsbury Opportunity Group. For services to Education in Shropshire.
- John Alexander Gibson. For services to the community in Belfast.
- Manfred Goldberg. For services to Holocaust Education and Awareness.
- Sara Jane Goode, Lead Nurse for Emergency Planning, Aneurin Bevan University Health Board. For services to Emergency Planning in Wales.
- Mairi (Alyn) Gowans, Physical Education Teacher, Hillhead High School. For services to Education and to Charity.
- Kathleen Mary Greaves. For services to Young People.
- Patricia Marjorie Greenhill. For services to the community in Roydon and Harlow, Essex.
- Michael Grime. For services to Scouts and to the community in Darwen, Lancashire.
- Stephen Paul Groom, Deputy Head, Physical and Personnel Security, Department for International Development. For services to Staff Safety.
- Nicholas Chandra Gupta, Lately Deputy Director for Wessex, Environment Agency. For services to the Environment in the West of England.
- William Colin Hamon, Lately Paramedic, South Western Ambulance Service NHS Foundation Trust. For services to the community in South West England.
- Bridget Patricia Hancock. For services to Disabled and to Disadvantaged Children's charities.
- Elizabeth Isobel Harling, Member, Kingussie Branch, Royal British Legion Scotland. For services to Remembrance and to the community in Inverness-shire.
- Paul Thomas Harmer, Desk Officer, Foreign and Commonwealth Office. For services to British foreign policy.
- Jason Harris. For services to Young People and to the community in Christchurch, Dorset.
- Yashmin Harun. For services to Female Black, Asian and Minority Ethnic Representation in Sport.
- David Hastings, Inspector and Chair, LGBTQ+ Network, Care Quality Commission. For services to the LGBTQ+ community.
- Christine Haywood, Clinical Director, Willowbrook Hospice. For services to End Of Life Care.
- Amy Hearn. For services to Libraries.
- Geoffrey Alan Hegarty. For services to Young People through the Scouting Movement in Northern Ireland.
- Stephen Philip Hemmings. For services to the community in Box and Minchinhampton, Gloucestershire.
- Colin Henry Higgs. For services to the community in Aston Abbotts, Buckinghamshire.
- Victoria Hind, B2, Ministry of Defence. For services to Defence.
- Tony Hitching, Team Leader, Department for Environment, Food and Rural Affairs. For voluntary service.
- Andrew Hogarth, Lately Area Amenity Officer, East Lothian Council. For services to Parks and Biodiversity in East Lothian.
- Anthony Hopkins. For services to Public Libraries.
- John Horton. For services to the Royal National Lifeboat Institution.
- Elizabeth Anne Hutchinson. For services to Libraries.
- Christine Ann Hoctoer Hyer, President, Cancer Support Group Mallorca. For services to British Nationals overseas.
- Jacqueline Helen Jack, Staff Officer, Defence Business Services, Ministry of Defence. For services to Military Personnel and to Charity.
- Carole Ann Jackson. For voluntary service to the Royal National Lifeboat Institution.
- Trevor John James. For services to Nature Conservation in Hertfordshire.
- Kevin Hugh Johns. For services to the community in Solihull, West Midlands.
- Sabila Jhinson, Ward Manager, Blackpool Teaching Hospitals NHS Foundation Trust. For services to Nursing.
- Dr. Jocelyn Oswald Dobbie Johnston. For services to the community in Aldershot, Hampshire, and Elstead, Surrey.
- Agnes Mitchell Johnstone, Head of Mathematics, Oban High School. For services to Science, Technology, Engineering and Mathematics (STEM) Education and the community in Oban.
- Denise Catherine Jones. For services to Libraries.
- Leslie Jones. For services to the community in Tameside through Fencing.
- Sheila Clark Jones, Committee Member, Kairnhill Management Committee. For services to the community in Aberdeen.
- Marie Evelyn Karstadt. For services to the community in the London Borough of Barking and Dagenham.
- Nadia Rehman Khan, Co-founder, The Delicate Mind. For services to Mental Health and to Integration in London and Birmingham.
- Subnum Hariff-Khan. For services to Public Libraries.
- Jacky Sheung Sang Kong. For services to the Chinese Community in Croydon.
- Dr. Peter Frank Kurer. For services to Holocaust Education.
- Ruth Lachs. For services to Holocaust Education.
- Oliver Garfield Laffin. For services to the Reserve Forces and to the community in County Down and County Armagh.
- Christopher Lamb. For services to Charity and to the Civil Service Lifeboat Fund.
- Robert Austin Lamb, Silversmith Craftsman. For services to the Preservation of Traditional Skills and to Sport in Mexborough, South Yorkshire.
- Phyllis Doreen Lambe. For services to the community in Sheffield, South Yorkshire.
- Winifred Jane Lane, Senior Nurse Tutor & Nurse Lecturer, Gibraltar Health Authority and School of Health Studies, Gibraltar. For services to the Gibraltar Health Authority.
- John Noel Last, Watch Commander, Suffolk Fire and Rescue Service. For services to the Fire and Rescue Service and the community in Suffolk.
- Frances Lavery. For services to Fostering in Northern Ireland.
- Bertram Omar Leon. For services to the St Lucian community in the UK and Abroad.
- Martin Ivor Lester. For services to the community in Lodsworth, West Sussex.
- Jeffrey Jones Lloyd. For services to Orchestral Music.
- Joan Lloyd, Founder, Friends of Woodlands Cemetery. For services to the community in Solihull.
- Melanie Ruth Lloyd, Volunteer, Phab. For services to Young People and to the community in South East England.
- Jacqueline Logan. For services to Same-Sex Ballroom Dancing.
- Kenneth Logan. For services to the Office of the Secretary of State for Scotland and to the community in Edinburgh.
- Donald Lincoln Longhurst. For services to Young People in Cheshire through the Scouts.
- John Thomas Lord. For services to the community in Hough on the Hill, Grantham, Lincolnshire.
- Malcolm Stuart Loveday. For services to the community in Chertsey, Surrey.
- Terence James Lowe, Executive Chairman, Electrical Safety UK Limited. For services to Business and Skills in the Electrical Engineering Industry.
- Letty Lucas. For services to Tennis and to Charity in Northern Ireland.
- David Geoffrey Lyon. For services to the community in Wigan.
- Barry Macaulay. For services to Disability Sport.
- Kenneth Alasdair Macdonald. For services to the community in Strathfillan, North Argyll.
- George Martin Mace. For services to Sport and to the community in Northern Ireland.
- Margaret Mary Rose Macinnes. For services to Highland Dancing and to the community in Helensburgh, Dunbartonshire.
- Sidney George Mackay, Chair and Trustee, the Police Roll of Honour Trust. For services to Police Remembrance.
- George Mann. For services to Young People through the Scouting Movement in Northern Ireland.
- Jack Marshall. For services to Charity.
- Alison Margaret Martin, Team Leader, The Prince's Trust. For services to Young People in Dumfries and Galloway.
- Elspeth Gardner Martin. For charitable services to the Midland Air Ambulance Charity.
- Kurt Marx. For services to Holocaust Education.
- Amelia Thomson Mathewson, Chair, Memorial Park Neighbourhood Centre. For services to the community in Levenmouth, Fife.
- Léonie Scott-Matthews. For services to British Theatre and to the community in Hampstead.
- Connor McCarroll. For services to Running and to Charity in County Tyrone.
- Bernard McComiskey. For services to Boxing and to the community in Gilford, County Down.
- Mark Anthony Scott McCree. For services to Public Libraries.
- Bernard Thomas McCullagh, Staff Officer, Department of Agriculture, Environment and Rural Affairs, Northern Ireland Executive. For services to the community in Northern Ireland.
- Michael McGarvie. For services to Local History in Frome, Somerset.
- Irene Mary McGrath. For services to Scottish Schools Debating.
- John Alexander McIlrath. For services to Sport in Northern Ireland.
- James Taylor Hamish McKay. For services to Young People and to the community in Levenmouth, Fife.
- Irwyn McKibbin. For services to the community through the Heartbeat NI Charity.
- Brian Thomas McLeod, Entertainer, Spain. For services to Charity.
- John Brian McMaster. For services to the Army Cadet Force in Northern Ireland.
- Sonya McMullan, Regional Services Manager, Women's Aid Northern Ireland. For services to Victims of Domestic and Sexual Abuse in Northern Ireland.
- John Joseph Laurence McNally. For services to Fundraising and to the community in Portrush.
- Timothy John Merett, Dairy Farmer. For services to Education in Gloucestershire.
- Martin Paul Merriman. For services to the community in The Wirral, Merseyside.
- Paul Michael. For services to Local Government in Antrim and Newtownabbey
- Graham John Miller, Lately Inspector, Public Order and Chemical, Biological, Radiological and Nuclear Unit, Police Scotland.For services to Law and Order.
- Michael Joseph John Moffitt. For voluntary service to the sport of Canoe Polo.
- Robert John Montgomery, Chair, Board of Governors, Castlederg High School and Edwards Primary School. For services to Education in Castlederg.
- Lieutenant Colonel Ray Morris Ogg. For services to the Combined Cadet Forces and to the Department for Work and Pensions.
- Alison Sally Glenn Mullan, Security Guard, Health and Social Care Board, Belfast. For services to Healthcare and to the community in Northern Ireland.
- Father Patrick Kevin Mullan. For services to Inter-Church Collaboration and to Community Relations in Northern Ireland.
- Heidi Elizabeth Murphy. For services to Education.
- Harrison Dax Nash, Charity Director at Maranatha Care Children (UK Charity) and Programme Manager, Maranatha Streetworkers Trust, South Africa. For services to young people in South Africa.
- Simon Neill. For services to Music and to Community Relations in Belfast.
- Barry Newton. For services to Grassroots Football and to Young People in Derbyshire.
- Leslie Robert Nicoll, Community Builder, Essex Fire and Rescue Service. For services to the Fire and Rescue Service and to the community in Essex.
- Donald Charles Norris. For services to the Scouting Movement.
- Kim Yvonne O'Keeffe, Director, Nursing, Midwifery and Allied Health Professions, Royal Cornwall Hospitals NHS Trust. For services to Nursing.
- Susannah Virginia O'Neill, Bus Driver and Safety Coordinator.For services to Public Transport and to the community in Northern Ireland.
- Isabel Susan Ingrid Oswell. For services to Public Libraries and to Business Support.
- Owen Francis O'Toole, Teacher, Southborough High School. For services to Children and Young People with Special Educational Needs and Disabilities.
- Matthew Amatoritsero Otubu. For voluntary service to Young People and Communities in the UK and Africa.
- Theratil Rajiv Antony Ouseph. For services to Badminton in Great Britain and the Promotion of Sport within the British Asian community.
- Sahdaish Kaur Pall. For services to Victims of Domestic Abuse and to the community in the West Midlands.
- William Alexander Parker. For services to Coastal Management.
- John Parmiter. For services to the community in Lea, Wiltshire.
- Kanubhai Raojibhai Patel. For services to the community in South West London and Surrey.
- Rita Patel, Correspondence Officer, HM Treasury. For services to Public Administration.
- Maureen Payne, President of Age Concern Costa Blanca Sur, Alicante, Spain. For services to British Nationals overseas.
- Pamela Payne. For voluntary and charitable service in Bristol and Bath.
- Anthony Thomas Pedley. For services to community in Coventry, West Midlands.
- Paul Robin Pemberton, Watch Manager and Impairment and Disability Officer, Essex County Fire and Rescue Service. For services to Hearing Impaired People in Essex.
- Heather Anne Penwarden, Chair, The League of Friends of Honiton Hospital. For services to the community in Honiton, Devon.
- Barry John Phillips. For services to Employment and Equality in Northern Ireland.
- Hannah Maria Phillips. For services to Charity.
- Heather Angela Platt. For services to Sports Development in Northern Ireland.
- James Neville Pogue. For services to Charitable Fundraising in Northern Ireland.
- Myrtle Winifred Pogue. For services to Charitable Fundraising in Northern Ireland.
- Gerard Liam Power. For services to Volunteering, to Fundraising and to the community in Northern Ireland.
- Afzal Pradhan, Volunteer Cricketeer, ICC Cricket World Cup 2019. For services to Cricket.
- Gilbert William Preece. For services to Football and to the community in Bentley and Darlaston, West Midlands.
- Derek Paul Radley. For services to the community in Dorset.
- Samson Frederick Rattigan, Youth Worker and Brighton Outreach Worker, Friends, Families and Travellers. For services to Young People and Families from the Gypsy and Traveller communities in Sussex.
- Alison Reddick. For services to People with Disabilities in Northern Ireland.
- Helen Louise Reddy. For services to Educational Gymnastics in Devon.
- Grace Marion Redfern, Founder Member, National Autistic Society, Cheshire and lately Trustee, Vivo Care Choices. For services to People with Autism and their Families.
- Vivienne June Cassandra Rees, Councillor, South Lakeland District Council. For services to the community in Cumbria.
- Amanda Joanne Reeve, Curriculum Manager, Norfolk County Council Adult Learning. For services to Education.
- Brian Reid. For services to Rugby in Northern Ireland.
- James Yule Keith Reid, West Midlands Police. For services to Community Safety and Cohesion.
- John (Jack) Reid. For services to Sport in Northern Ireland.
- Cecil Anthony Lars Repetto, Lay Minister, St Mary's Anglican Church, Tristan da Cunha. For services to the community in Tristan da Cunha.
- Ernest Thomas Rhoden, Senior Science Laboratory Technician, Maria Fidelis Secondary School, Camden. For services to Education.
- Ilene Sheila Ana Stuart Richardson, Chairperson, British Ladies Association, Madrid, Spain. For services to British Nationals overseas.
- Reverend Wynne Roberts. For charitable services.
- Wlodka Robertson. For services to Holocaust Education.
- Geoffrey Walter Rofe. For services to Badminton and Young People.
- Abdool Hamid Rohomon, West Midlands Police. For services to Policing.
- Edward Patrick Rogers, Lay Minister, St Mary's Anglican Church, Tristan da Cunha. For services to the community in Tristan da Cunha.
- Alan Ross. For services to the community in Ballymena.
- The Countess of Rosslyn, Trustee and Chair of Management Committee, Rosslyn Chapel Trust. For services to Charity.
- Andrew Conrad Rowan. For services to Music and to the community in Northern Ireland.
- Lesley Anne Rudd, Chief Executive Officer, Sustainable Energy Association. For services to UK Energy Markets and to Clean Growth.
- Norman Reginald Sage. For services to Bristol Cathedral and to the community in Bristol.
- Mark William Sanders, Tiverton Detachment Commander, Devon Army Cadet Force. For services to Young People.
- Paramjit Singh Sandhu, Immigration Officer, Home Office. For services to Community Engagement.
- Susan Elizabeth Sandle, Voluntary charity organiser and fundraiser. For services to disadvantaged children in St Lucia.
- Amanda Susan Elizabeth Say. For services to People with Disabilities in Wales.
- Ariel Henry Schachter. For services to Holocaust Education and Awareness.
- Wolfgang Marc Schatzberger. For services to Holocaust Education and Awareness.
- Gordon Frank Schofield. For services to the Royal National Lifeboat Institution and to Charity.
- Elizabeth Russell Seaton, Chair, North Lanarkshire Carers Together. For services to the Carers Network in Scotland.
- Brian Seddon. For services to the community in Atherton, Wigan.
- Ruby Seymour Selby. For services to the community in East Holme, Dorset.
- Alan William Seldon, Metropolitan Police Service. For services to the Special Constabulary and to the Specialist Art Crime Unit.
- John Shakeshaft. For services to Young People in Ulverston.
- Helen Mary Shanahan, Infant Feeding Coordinator, Royal Cornwall Hospitals NHS Trust and Breastfeeding Counsellor, National Childbirth Trust. For services to Midwifery.
- Christopher Sheldon, Volunteer Cricketeer, ICC Cricket World Cup 2019. For services to Cricket.
- Susan Laura Sibbald, Personality Disorder Peer Specialist, Sheffield Health and Social Care NHS Foundation Trust. For services to Mental Health.
- Benjamin Simbo, Custodian, Prime Minister's Office. For services to 10 Downing Street.
- Kathryn Lindsay Singh. For services to the Arts and to the Asian community in Scotland.
- Alison Doreen Smith. For services to the community in East Belfast.
- Margaret Helena Joan Smith. For services to Community Music and Fundraising.
- Natalie Smith, Community Development and Equalities Manager, Thurrock Council. For services to the community in Thurrock, Essex.
- Robert Jeffery Smith. For service to Policing and to the community in Northern Ireland.
- Mark Kevan Thompson-Smith. For services to Music in Hampshire and West Sussex.
- Lee John Spencer, Voluntary Fundraiser, Royal Marines Charity and the Endeavour Fund. For Charitable Fundraising.
- Edward John Claude Spreckley. For services to the community in Marple, Stockport.
- Christine Elizabeth Stead, Executive Support Assistant, Cheshire Fire and Rescue Service. For services to the Fire and Rescue Service.
- Sonja Sternberg. For services to Holocaust Education.
- Christine Stewart. For services to the community in Starbeck, North Yorkshire.
- Marvyn Stewart, Volunteer, Dunfermline Athletic Supporters Club Shop and Tea Room. For services to Football and to the community in Dunfermline, Fife.
- Margaret Stone. For services to the community in Brightlingsea, Essex.
- Lynda Joan Storey, Executive Officer, Pay and Allowances, HM Prison Service Headquarters. For public and charitable services.
- Elizabeth Ann Marie Stout, Member, Cheshire County Priory Group, St John Ambulance. For services to St John Ambulance.
- Alan Terence Studd. For services to Young People and to the community in West Yorkshire.
- Stepheney McPherson-Sulaiman, Trustee, Wandsworth Sickle Cell and Thalassaemia Support Group and lately Specialist Nurse Manager. For services to People with Sickle Cell and Thalassaemia Disorders.
- Marianne Dorothee Summerfield. For services to Holocaust Education and Awareness.
- Peter William Summerfield. For services to Holocaust Education and Awareness.
- Kaiya Rose Swain. For services to the WorldSkills Competition.
- Valerie May Symon. For services to the community in Bedfordshire and Buckinghamshire.
- Arthur Gordon Tait. For services to the community in the London Borough of Kensington and Chelsea.
- Alan Tavener. For services to Choral Music in Scotland.
- David Edward Taylor, LL. For services to community Fundraising and Volunteering.
- Michael Taylor. For services to the community in Axbridge, Somerset.
- Norman Alexander Taylor, T.D. For services to the community in Londonderry.
- Thomas Kenneth Taylor. For services to Business and to the community in Northern Ireland.
- Peter Wynne Thomas. For services to Grassroots Cricket in Norfolk.
- Jacqueline Thompson, ICT Learning Officer, Gateshead Council. For services to Public Libraries.
- Robert Thompson. For services to Commemoration and Remembrance in Northern Ireland.
- Jean Alexander Watt Thomson. For services to the community in Prestonpans, East Lothian.
- Michael Todd. For services to Horse Racing and to Business in Northern Ireland.
- Ernest William Tomlinson. For services to the community in Derbyshire.
- Rachel Tonkin. For services to the Royal National Lifeboat Institution.
- Sandie Shurane Dean Tracey. For services to the Department for Work and Pensions and to the community in the London Borough of Southwark.
- Angela Louise Tromans, Defence Transits Manager, British Embassy Cairo, Egypt. For services to UK defence overseas.
- Dorothy Gillian (Jill) Truman. For services to the community in the London Borough of Merton.
- David John Turner. For services to Families of Terminally Ill Children.
- James Kenneth Twyble. For services to Local Government, to Education and to the community in Craigavon.
- Harpreet Singh Virdee. For services to the Black, Asian and Minority Ethnic community and to Diversity and Inclusion.
- Safet Vukalic. For services to Genocide Education.
- Dr. Roy Frederick Wales. For services to Choral Music.
- Denyse Kathleen Walker, Home Start Organiser. For services to Family Welfare in Northern Ireland.
- Lisa Claire Wallis, Founder and lately Chair, ChemoHero. For services to People with Cancer and their Families.
- Emma Walton, Vice Chair, Grimsby Sea Cadets. For services to Young People in Lincolnshire.
- Christopher Michael Ward, Lately Neighbourhood Inspector, Thames Valley Police. For services to the community in West Berkshire.
- Roland Warmington. For services to Lifesaving and to HM Coastguard.
- Stefen Nicholas Wells, Adult Volunteer, Sea Cadet Corps. For services to Young People.
- Tamsen Wetherall. For services to Charitable Fundraising and to Girlguiding in Bridgwater.
- Sarah Elizabeth Wheeler, Lately Administrative Assistant, English Language Department, Directorate-General for Translation, European Commission, Brussels, Belgium. For services to the English language within the European Union.
- Veronica Elizabeth Wheeler, President, British Benevolent Association of Girona, Spain. For services to British Nationals overseas.
- Professor Anthony David White, Lead Clinician for Elderly Medicine, Wrexham Maelor Hospital. For services to Medicine in Wales.
- Geoffrey William Wickham. For services to Music in Bristol.
- Juliet Wiles, Volunteer Cricketeer, ICC Cricket World Cup 2019. For services to Cricket.
- Eva Willman. For services to Holocaust Education.
- George Thomson Wilson. For services to Young People.
- Simon Winton. For services to Holocaust Education and Awareness.
- Uri Stefan Winterstein. For services to Holocaust Education and Awareness.
- Dorit Oliver-Wolff. For services to Holocaust Education and Awareness.
- Dorothy Wood. For services to the community in Radcliffe, Manchester.
- Penelope Ann Woodley, Volunteer, Timespan. For services to Art, to Heritage and to the community in Helmsdale, Sutherland.
- Alan Wrigley. For services to Charity.
- Ingrid Wuga. For services to Holocaust Education and Awareness.
- Ibrahim Yousaf. For services to the community in Oldham, Greater Manchester.
- Susan Moira Zubrot. For services to the community in Bedfordshire.

=== Queen's Police Medal (QPM) ===
Ribbon bar of the Queen's Police Medal for Distinguished Service

- Detective Constable Deborah Abinbola Modupe Akinlawon, Metropolitan Police Service.
- Chief Superintendent Claire Louise Bell, West Midlands Police.
- Angelina Lesley Carey, Lately Detective Sergeant, North Yorkshire Police.
- Mark Collins, Chief Constable, Dyfed-Powys Police.
- Constable Claire Louise Dinsdale, Dorset Police.
- Detective Superintendent Nigel William Doak, Thames Valley Police.
- Detective Superintendent Lisa Harman, Metropolitan Police Service.
- Richard John Lewis, Deputy Chief Constable, South Wales Police.
- Detective Chief Superintendent Fiona Annette Mallon, Metropolitan Police Service.
- Paul Mills, Deputy Chief Constable, Wiltshire Police.
- Superintendent Dave Minty, Wiltshire Police.
- Detective Superintendent Dominic Murphy, Metropolitan Police Service.
- Constable Bharat Kumar Narbad, South Wales Police.
- Temporary Inspector Neil Edward Sladen, Lancashire Constabulary.
- Susan Southern, Assistant Chief Constable, West Midlands Police.
- Julian Gwynne Williams, Lately Chief Constable, Gwent Police.
- Gareth Ian Wilson, Lately Chief Constable, Suffolk Constabulary.
- Detective Sergeant Julie Dawn Forsythe, Police Service of Northern Ireland.
- Detective Inspector David Lowans, Police Service of Northern Ireland.
- Sergeant David James McIlwaine, Police Service of Northern Ireland.
- Gillian MacDonald, Assistant Chief Constable, Police Scotland.
- Gerry McLean, Detective Chief Superintendent, Police Scotland.

=== Queen's Fire Service Medal (QFSM) ===
Ribbon bar of the Queen's Fire Service Medal for Distinguished Service

- Rebecca Jayne Bryant, Chief Fire Officer, Staffordshire Fire and Rescue Service.
- Philip Mark Hales, Lately, Deputy Chief Fire Officer, West Midlands Fire Service.
- Terence Edward McDermott, Lately, Chief Fire Officer, Derbyshire Fire and Rescue Service.
- Brian Michael Reardon, Group Commander, London Fire Brigade.
- David Harbinson, Station Commander, Northern Ireland Fire and Rescue Service.
- James Arthur Hymas, Area Manager, Scottish Fire and Rescue Service.

=== Queen's Ambulance Service Medal (QAM) ===
Ribbon bar of the Queen's Ambulance Service Medal for Distinguished Service

- Thomas Bailey, Paramedic, East Midlands Ambulance Service NHS Trust.
- Trevor Baldwin, Senior Manager, Emergency Operations Centre, Yorkshire Ambulance NHS Trust.
- Joanne Rees-Thomas, Non Emergency Patient Transport Service General Manager, Welsh Ambulance Services NHS Trust.
- Nicholas Richards-Ozzati, Emergency Medical Technician, Welsh Ambulance Services NHS Trust.
- Gail Topping, Paramedic, Scottish Ambulance Service.

=== Queen's Volunteer Reserves Medal (QVRM) ===
Ribbon bar of the Queen's Volunteer Reserves Medal

Royal Navy

- Lieutenant William Benbow

British Army

- Major Erik Radman Charles Brdderstad
- Major Michael Craig Jamison
- Major William George Murray
- Warrant Officer Class 2 David Perring

Royal Air Force

- Warrant Officer Norman Frank Alexander Davenport
- Warrant Officer Leslie George Hotson

=== Overseas Territories Police Medal (OTPM) ===
Ribbon bar of the Overseas Territories Police Medal for Meritorious Service

- Menelaos Louca, Sergeant, Sovereign Base Areas Police

== Crown Dependencies ==
=== The Most Excellent Order of the British Empire ===
==== Officer of the Order of the British Empire (OBE) ====
Civil
Jersey

- Geoffrey John Grime, for services to the Community.

Isle of Man

- Hector McDonald Hugh Duff, BEM for services to the community on the Isle of Man.

==== Member of the Order of the British Empire (MBE) ====
Guernsey

- Walter Stuart Trought, for services to Alderney.
- David Edward de Hubie Swiffen, for services to Wellbeing and to Inter-faith dialogue in Guernsey.

Jersey

- Francis Joseph Laine, for services to the community through the Silkworth Lodge and Shelter Trust.
- Stewart Edgar Mourant, Chairman of Jersey Mencap and Les Amis, for services to the Community

Isle of Man

- Richard Eaton Welsh, for services to the Maritime Community on the Isle of Man and worldwide.

=== British Empire Medal (BEM) ===
Guernsey

- Bryan Frank Brehault, for services to young people in Guernsey through The Boys' Brigade.

== Barbados ==
Below are the individuals appointed by Elizabeth II in her right as Queen of Barbados, on advice of Her Majesty's Barbados Ministers.

=== The Most Distinguished Order of Saint Michael and Saint George ===
==== Knights Commander of the Order of St Michael and St George (KCMG / DCMG) ====
- Cuthbert Gordon Greenidge, M.B.E. For services to Cricket and to the development of Sport.

=== The Most Excellent Order of the British Empire ===
==== Commander of the Order of the British Empire (CBE) ====
- Bernell Llewellyn Arrindell. For his contribution to International Business Services and to the Private Sector.
- Magrita Marshall. For services to the development of local gospel music and to the promotion of Christian values through music.
- Professor Velma Eudora Newton. For services to Legal Education and to the development of Law Libraries.

==== Officer of the Order of the British Empire (OBE) ====
- Dr. David Andrew Byer. For services in the field of Emergency Medicine.
- Sandra Rosemary Bernadette Field-Kellman. For services in the field of Early Childhood Education and to the Girl Guide Movement.
- Condé Andrew Riley. For services in the field of Sport and in particular cricket administration.

==== Member of the Order of the British Empire (MBE) ====
- Arthur Henry Ricardo Blackman. For services to Broadcasting and to mass communications.
- Desmond Ralph Crichlow. For services to Tertiary Education and to the development of Information Technology.
- Jean Margaret Holder. For services to Nursing, particularly in the field of obstetrics and gynaecology.

== The Bahamas ==
Below are the individuals appointed by Elizabeth II in her right as Queen of The Bahamas, on advice of Her Majesty's Ministers in the Bahamas.

=== The Most Distinguished Order of Saint Michael and Saint George ===
==== Knight Commander of the Order of St Michael and St George (KCMG) ====
- Godfrey Kelly, CMG. For services to Business and to Sport.

=== The Most Excellent Order of the British Empire ===
==== Commander of the Order of the British Empire (CBE) ====
- Peter Goulandris. For services to Business.
- The Reverend Dr. Carrington Samuel Pinder. For services to Religion and to the Community.
- Orville Alton Thompson Turnquest. For services to politics and to public service.

==== Officer of the Order of the British Empire (OBE) ====
- Peter Desmond Cole. For services to Business.

==== Member of the Order of the British Empire (MBE) ====
- Captain Kenneth Raymond Carroll. For services to Business.
- Terence Robert Horace Gape. For services to Business.
- Senator the Honourable Dr. Mildred Hall-Watson. For services to Medicine and to Civic Involvement.
- Juanita Denise Lewis-Johnson. For services to Business and to Politics.
- Coralie McMillan-Adderley. For services to Public Health.
- The Reverend Dr. Irene Russell. For services to Religion.
- Janis Elizabeth Saunders. For services to Business and to Politics.

=== British Empire Medal (BEM) ===
- Charles Kermit Cates. For services to Business and to family island development.
- Emily Antoinette Colebrook. For services to the Community.
- Carl Richard Culmer Sr. For services to Politics.
- Joy Alexander Duncombe. For services to Community involvement.
- Reverend Kenneth Reginald Knowles. For services to Religion.
- Everard Garvin Tony Lewis. For services to Business and to Civic involvement.
- Matilda Robinson. For services to the Community.
- Gregory A Sherman. For services to Business.

=== Queen's Police Medal (QPM) ===
- Samuel Elijah Butler, Assistant Commissioner of Police. For services to the Royal Bahamas Police Force.
- Ismela Davis-Delancy, Assistant Commissioner of Police. For services to the Royal Bahamas Police Force.

== Grenada ==
Below are the individuals appointed by Elizabeth II in her right as Queen of Grenada, on advice of Her Majesty's Grenada Ministers.

=== The Most Excellent Order of the British Empire ===
==== Officer of the Order of the British Empire (OBE) ====
- The Reverend Dr. Raphael Osbert James. For Religious and Community service.

==== Member of the Order of the British Empire (MBE) ====
- Dr. Heusent Ashton James. For service to the Community and to Health.
- Suresh Karnani. For services to Business.
- Emma Logan. For services to Business and to the Community.

=== British Empire Medal (BEM) ===
- Carlos Anthony Lewis. For services to Sport.

== Solomon Islands ==
Below are the individuals appointed by Elizabeth II in her right as Queen of the Solomon Islands, on advice of Her Majesty's Solomon Island Ministers.

=== The Most Excellent Order of the British Empire ===
==== Member of the Order of the British Empire (MBE) ====
- Toata Molea. For services to Commerce and to Community development.
- Dr. Anne-Maree Schwarz. For services to Fisheries and to Community development.

=== British Empire Medal (BEM) ===
- Francis Deve. For services to Rural and Community development.
- Johnson Fataolisia Honimae. For services to the Media and to Communication.
- Osanty Ludawane. For services to Rural and Community development.

== Belize ==
Below are the individuals appointed by Elizabeth II in her right as Queen of Belize, on advice of Her Majesty's Belize Ministers.

=== The Most Excellent Order of the British Empire ===
==== Knight Commander of the Order of the British Empire (KBE) ====
- Ralph Gregory Feinstein, OBE For his contribution to Entrepreneurial Leadership

==== Officer of the Order of the British Empire (OBE) ====
- Faith L Babb. For services to the Community, to Politics and to Women's development.
- Penelope Kay Casasola. For services to Community and Health Education volunteerism

==== Member of the Order of the British Empire (MBE) ====
- Alex Chang. For services to Entrepreneurial Leadership and to the Community.
- Aurelio Garcia. For services to Religion and to Community service.
- Elden Hyde. For services to Music.
- Pedro A Salazar. For services to Community activism.
- Elito Urbina. For services to Education and to Political leadership.

== Antigua and Barbuda ==
Below are the individuals appointed by Elizabeth II in her right as Queen of Antigua and Barbuda, on advice of Her Majesty's Ministers in Antigua and Barbuda.

=== The Most Excellent Order of the British Empire ===
==== Officer of the Order of the British Empire (OBE) ====
- Ernest Jack Letby. For services to Business and to Community development.

==== Member of the Order of the British Empire (MBE) ====
- Karl Benard James. For services to Sailing and to National development.

=== Queen's Police Medal (QPM) ===
- Atlee Patrick Rodney, Commissioner of Police, Royal Police Force of Antigua and Barbuda. For services to National and Regional security

== Saint Christopher and Nevis ==
Below are the individuals appointed by Elizabeth II in her right as Queen of Saint Christopher and Nevis, on advice of Her Majesty's Saint Christopher and Nevis Ministers.

=== Order of Saint Michael and Saint George ===
==== Companion of the Order of Saint Michael and Saint George (CMG) ====
- Josephine Huggins. For public service.

=== The Most Excellent Order of the British Empire ===
==== Officer of the Order of the British Empire (OBE) ====
- Hyleeta Miranda Liburd. For public service.

==== Member of the Order of the British Empire (MBE) ====
- Dr. N Analdo Bailey. For services to the Banking and Financial sector.
- Dr. Leroy Richardson. For his contribution to Medical services.
