= James Sherr =

James Sherr is a British-American academic and researcher focusing on the study of Russia. He currently is a Senior Fellow at the International Centre for Defence & Security in Tallinn, Estonia, since 2019. He also is an associate fellow and earlier was the head of the Russia and Eurasia programme at Chatham House (2008–11).

Sherr was at the Social Studies Faculty of Oxford University from 1993 to 2012, a lecturer at Lincoln College, Oxford from 1986 to 2008, and a fellow of the Conflict Studies Research Centre of the UK Ministry of Defence from 1995 to 2008.

He publishes on Russian military, security and foreign policy, as well as energy security, the Black Sea Region and Ukraine's effort to deal with Russia, the West and its own domestic problems.

His publications include Hard Diplomacy and Soft Coercion: Russia’s Influence Abroad (Chatham House, 2013), The Militarization of Russian Policy (Transatlantic Academy, July 2017) and he is a co-author of the Chatham House Report, The Struggle for Ukraine (October 2017). For several years, Sherr was a participant at the Valdai Discussion Club meetings. For many years, Sherr had warned that Russia, as "our most important neighbour will become our most important problem."

He was awarded an Order of the British Empire (OBE) in the 2020 New Year Honours for his services to British interests overseas.
