= Gillian MacDonald =

Gillian MacDonald QPM
- Known for: Policing and community protection

Gillian MacDonald QPM was Assistant Chief Constable of Police Scotland. She was awarded the Queen's Police Medal in the 2020 New Year Honours.

== Biography ==
MacDonald worked with the Scottish Crime and Drug Enforcement Agency as a detective chief inspector, as an Area Commander at Gorbals, where she set up the Govanhill Hub, and in CID. While Assistant Chief Constable of Major Crime and Public Protection, she introduced a 'get consent' campaign to raise awareness of date rape. The consent campaign focused on changing behaviours and attitudes of 18 to 35-year-old men, who were the largest group of offenders. The campaign was welcomed by Rape Crisis Scotland. She has also spoken out about human trafficking in Scotland, particularly as it manifests as violence against women and children. The campaign urged people to report signs of potential trafficking and sexual exploitation, such as multiple female foreign nationals living at the same address in houses where they are rarely seen outside.

MacDonald retired from the police in 2020.
