= Harry Billinge =

British soldier (1925–2022)

Harry Billinge MBE
- Billinge as a soldier and veteran
- Born: 15 September 1925
- Died: 5 April 2022 (aged 96)
- Allegiance: United Kingdom

Harry Billinge MBE (15 September 1925 – 5 April 2022) was a British soldier.

Billinge was born on 15 September 1925. He served as a sapper with the 44 Royal Engineer Commandos during the Normandy landings. After World War II, Billinge moved to Cornwall and opened a hairdressers.

In a 2019 interview with BBC Billinge was quoted as saying "Don't thank me and don't say I'm a hero. I'm no hero, I was lucky, I'm here. All the heroes are dead and I'll never forget them as long as I live."

Billinge was appointed Member of the Order of the British Empire (MBE) in the 2020 New Year Honours for services to charitable fundraising, after raising more than £25,000 towards the cost of construction of the British Normandy Memorial. He was also awarded the Legion d'Honneur.

In 2020, train company GWR named one of their Class 802 trains after him.

Billinge died on 5 April 2022, at the age of 96. A funeral was held at St Paul's Church in Charlestown on 26 April 2022.
