= Matt Hyde (executive) =

British executive (born 1975)

Matthew Thomas Hyde OBE (born February 1975) is a British charity executive.

Hyde attended Queen Mary University and Westminster Business School while starting his career working in student unions, ultimately becoming the chief executive of the National Union of Students from 2006 to 2013.

He was appointed chief executive of The Scout Association in April 2013. As chief executive of the Scout Association, he oversaw the development and delivery of a rebrand of the organisation. He also worked to support the growth of Scouting in areas of deprivation and the launch of an early years section (Squirrel Scouts) for four- and five-year-olds.

He was a vice-chair of the National Council of Voluntary Organizations, a trustee of Step Up to Serve from 2014 to 2020, and a patron of UNLOCK (a national association of reformed offenders). He became a trustee of Comic Relief in February 2019 and was appointed an Officer of the Order of the British Empire (OBE) in the 2020 New Year Honours.

In 2024, Hyde left The Scouts, to be appointed CEO of the Lloyds Bank Foundation, with effect from September of that year.
