= Mash Direct =

Northern Irish food production company

Mash Direct is a farming and food production company based in Comber, County Down, Northern Ireland.

As of 2016, Mash Direct employed 180 people at its farm. The company produces and supplies vegetable and potato products to supermarkets (including Asda and Morrisons) and independent retailers across the UK and Ireland and exports to the US and the Middle East.

Mash Direct was founded by Martin and Tracy Hamilton as a family business, in 2004 diversifying from their potato and vegetable farm. Their products include prepared potato, croquettes, potato cakes and vegetable burgers.

== Company history ==
The company opened its first factory in 2004, supplying mashed potato products to retailers Mace, N. Aiken, and Creightons in Belfast, branching out to the Republic of Ireland in 2005, supplying Dunnes Stores.

Between 2006 and 2007, the company developed sauce-based recipes, including red cabbage and beetroot; broccoli and cheese sauce; creamy garlic potatoes. Coverage on BBC Radio 4 led to the first visit of Jamie Oliver.

The company expanded distribution into Scotland in 2006, the US in 2009, Dubai in 2012. In 2013, all products were made gluten free.

== Awards ==
Mash Direct has won 16 Great Taste Awards including the Guild of Fine Food - Great Taste Award (2015).

Other awards received include:

- Crispy Vegetable Bakes - SIAL Abu Dhabi Gold Innovation Award (2016)
- Vegetable Burgers - Irish Quality Food and Drink Awards (2016)
- Mash Direct Vegetable Burgers - The Grocer New Product Award (2015)
- Best Managed Company Award (Deloitte, 2015)
- Jack Hamilton, Mash Direct Marketing Director, The Grocer Top New Talent Award (2015)
