= Challenger Armoured Repair and Recovery Vehicle =

UK armoured recovery vehicle

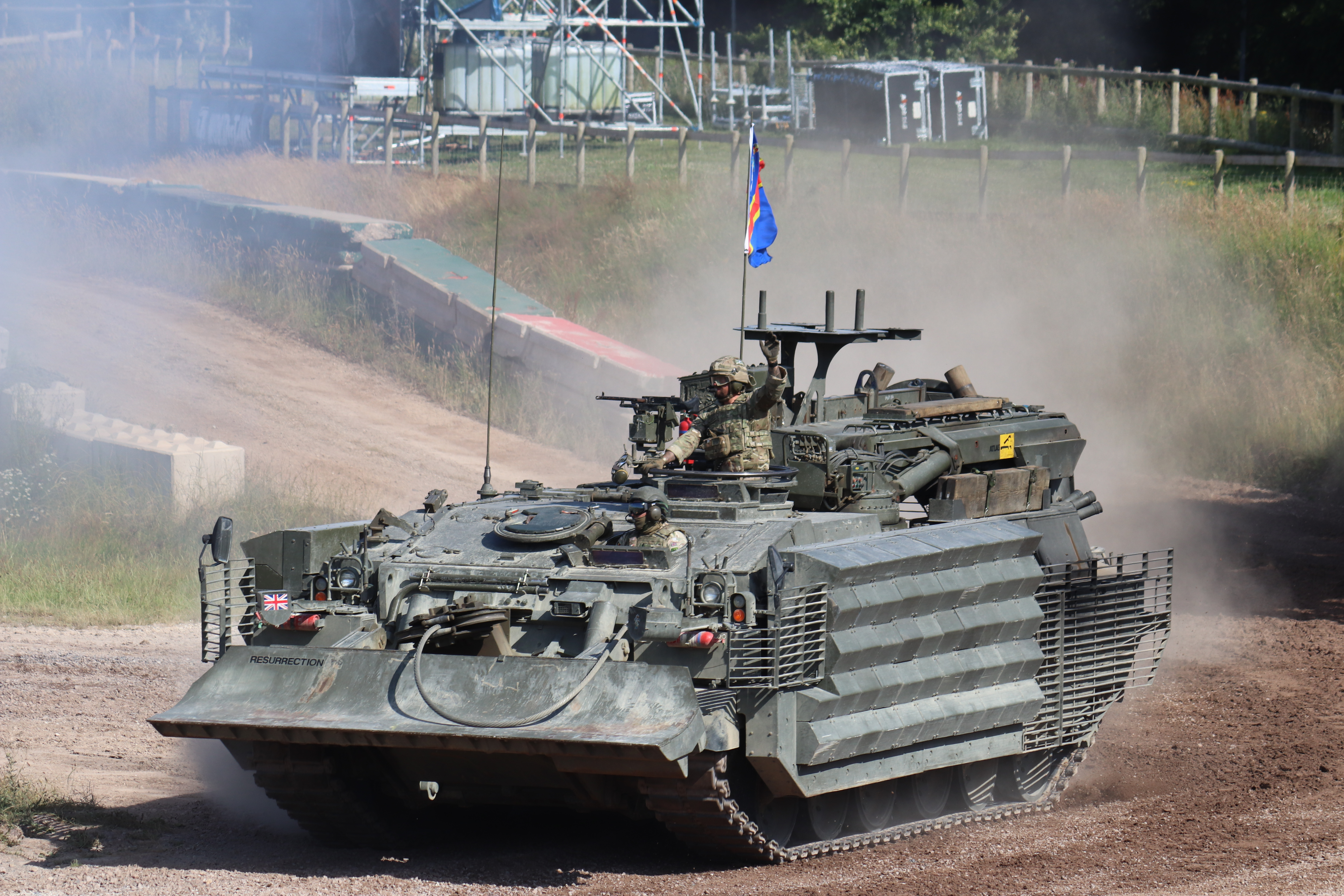
- A CRARRV flying the REME corps standard at Tankfest, The Tank Museum, Dorset, 2025.
- Type: Armoured Recovery Vehicle
- Place of origin: United Kingdom

Service history
- In service: 1988 - present
- Used by: British Army; Royal Army of Oman
- Wars: First Gulf War; Iraq War; War in Afghanistan

Production history
- Designer: Vickers Defence
- Designed: 1985
- Produced: 1988-1993
- No. built: 84

Specifications
- Mass: 61.2 t (60.2 long tons; 67.5 short tons)
- Length: 9.61 m (31.5 ft)
- Width: 3.62 m (11.9 ft)
- Height: 3.13 m (10.3 ft)
- Crew: 3
- Passengers: 2
- Armour: Rolled homogeneous armour and applique armour
- Main armament: None
- Secondary armament: 1 x 7.62mm GPMG; Smoke dischargers
- Engine: Perkins-Condor CV12-5C/6C; 1200 bhp
- Transmission: David Brown TN54E
- Operational range: 500 km (310 mi)
- Maximum speed: 59.2 km/h (36.8 mph)

The Challenger Armoured Repair and Recovery Vehicle or CRARRV is a large British armoured recovery vehicle based on the hull of the Challenger 1 main battle tank. The CRARRV is currently operated in conjunction with the Challenger 2 tanks of the British Army and Royal Army of Oman. It is one of the few vehicles capable of repairing and recovering Challenger tanks in the field. Eighty vehicles were delivered to the British between 1988 and 1993; an additional four vehicles were delivered to Oman.

== Design ==
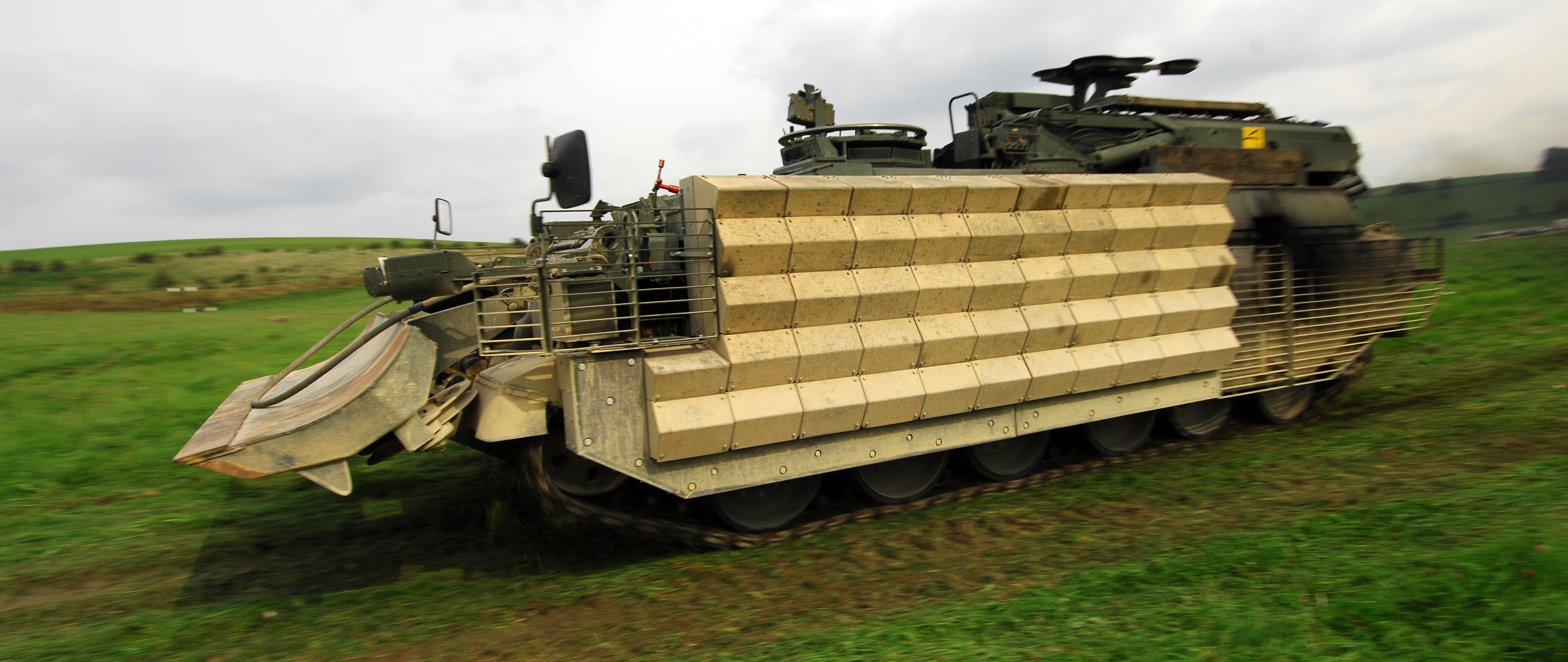
A CRARRV on Salisbury Plain in 2008.

In 1985, the UK MoD ordered a derivative armoured recovery vehicle from Vickers Defence, based on the Challenger 1, to replace those based on the FV4204 Chieftain ARV/ARRV.

The size and performance of the CRARRV are similar to a Challenger 1 tank, but instead of armament it is fitted with:

- A main winch with 50 tonnes-force pull in a 1:1 configuration or 98 tonnes-force pull using an included pulley in a 2:1 configuration and anchor point on the vehicle, plus a small auxiliary winch to aid in deploying the main winch rope.
- Atlas crane capable of lifting 6,500 kg (14,300 lb) at a distance of 4.9 m (16 ft) (this is sufficient to lift a Challenger 2 power pack).
- Dozer blade to use as an earth anchor/stabiliser, or in obstacle clearance and fire position preparation.
- Large set of recovery and heavy repair tools including a man-portable ultrathermic cutting system with an underwater cutting capability and a man-portable welder.

In order to improve flexibility and supplement the transportation of power packs around the battlefield, the British Army procured a quantity of dedicated CRARRV High Mobility Trailers (HMT). Each HMT enables a CRARRV to transport a single (Challenger, Titan or Trojan) power pack or two Warrior power packs, by altering the configuration of dedicated fixtures and attachment of fittings.

CRARRVs have subsequently been upgraded to use the updated Challenger 2 powertrain consisting of a CV12-5C/6C engine with TN54E transmission.

Each CRARRV has five seats but usually carries a crew of three soldiers from the Royal Electrical and Mechanical Engineers (REME), of the recovery mechanic and vehicle mechanic/technician trades. There is room in the cabin for two further passengers (e.g. crew members of the casualty vehicle) on a temporary basis.

== Operational history ==
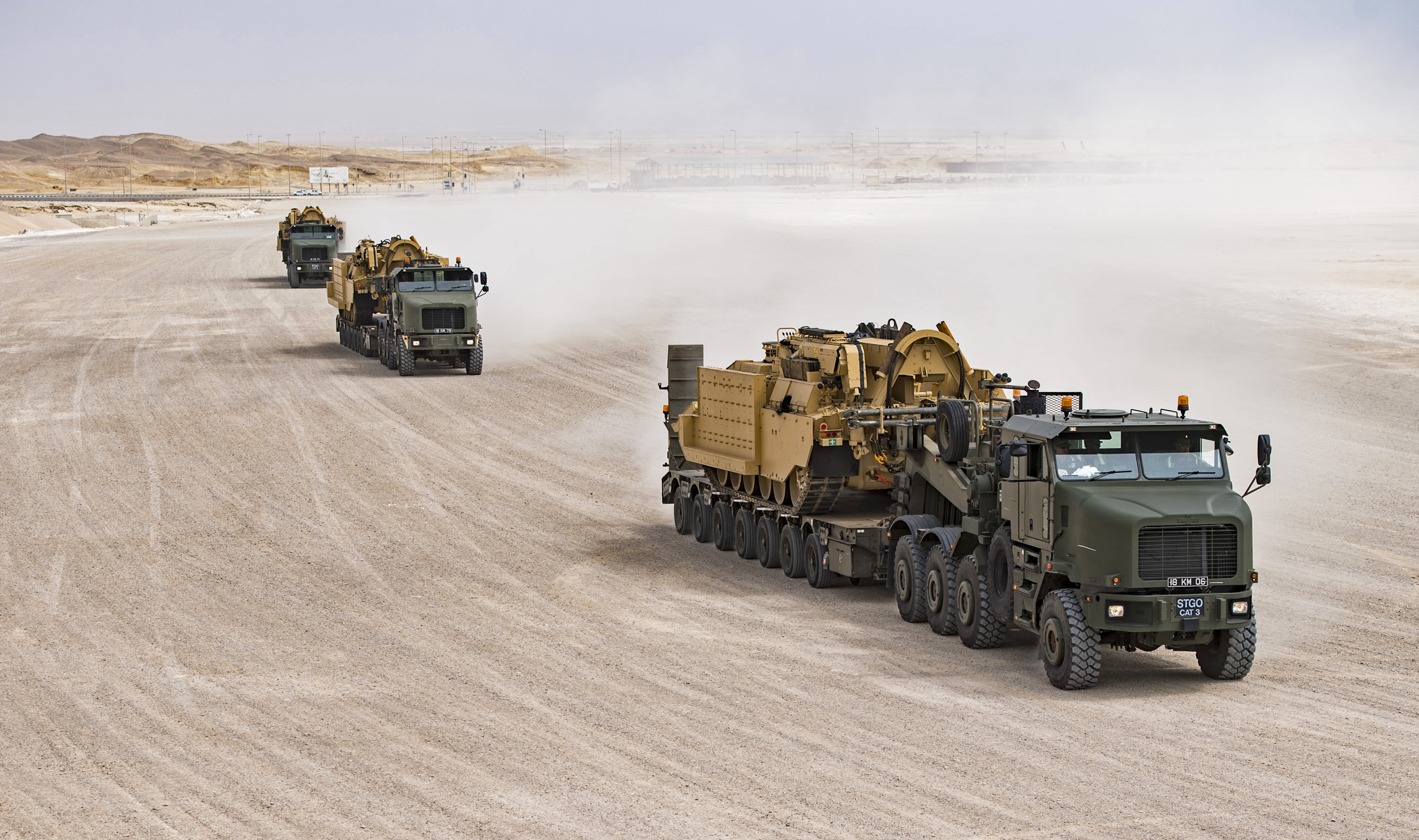
CRARRVs being transported in the Omani desert on Exercise Saif Sareea 3 in 2018.

British CRARRVs were first deployed in action in the lead up to the First Gulf War, Operation Granby in 1991.

CRARRVs supported Challenger 1 and later Challenger 2 tanks as part of peacekeeping efforts in Bosnia and Kosovo.

They were subsequently deployed alongside Challenger 2 tanks during the 2003 invasion of Iraq, Operation Telic in 2003.

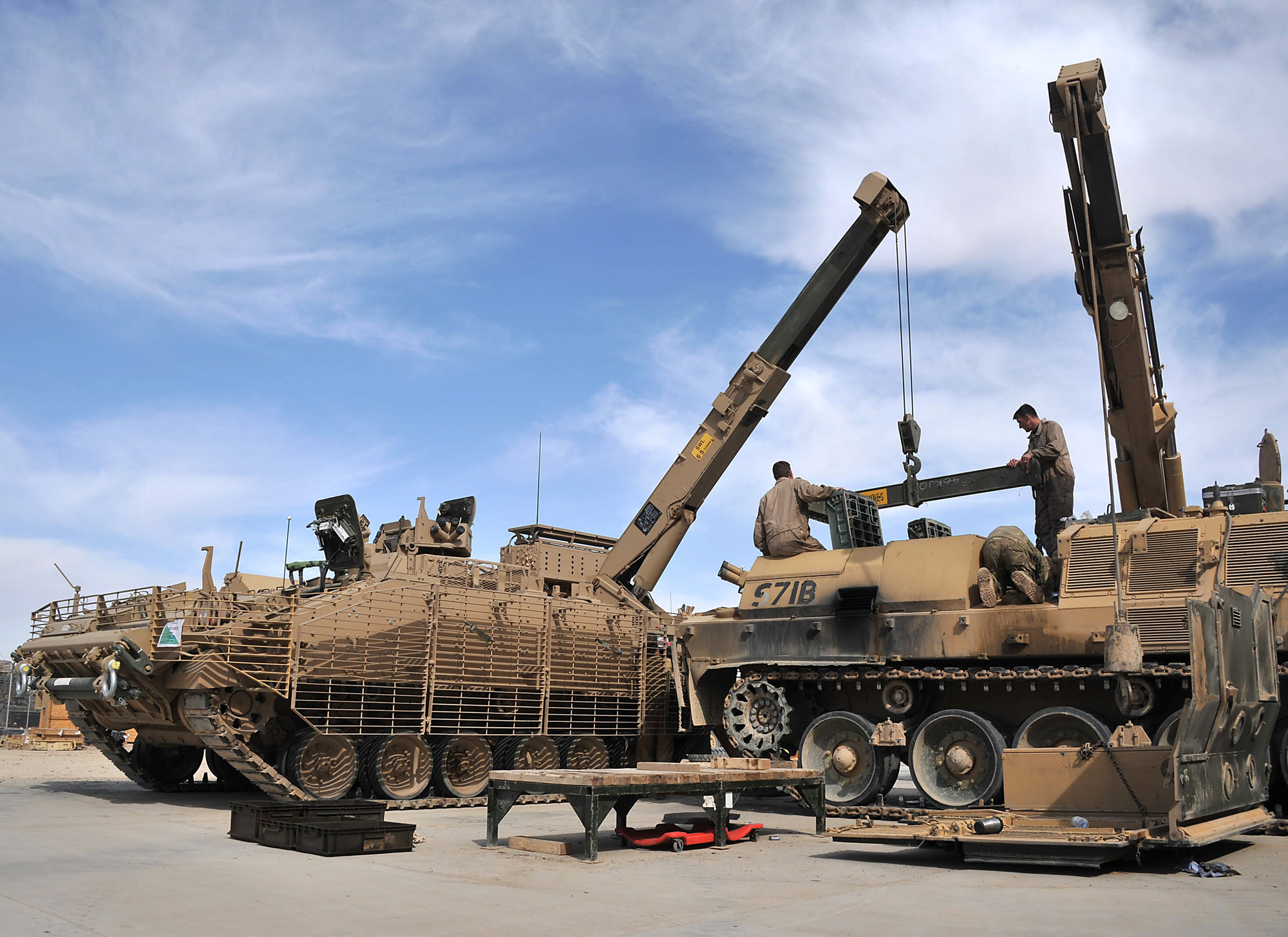
A CRARRV replacing the powerpack of a second CRARRV in Afghanistan in 2012

British CRARRVs were also deployed as part of Operation Herrick, the British contribution to the International Security Assistance Force (ISAF) during the War in Afghanistan where they supported British Challenger 2-derived Titan bridgelayers and Trojan combat engineering vehicles.

In 2020, a CRARRV was proposed to be used to recover rail vehicles in the aftermath of the Stonehaven derailment, however this does not appear to have happen with the article likely speculating saying "it may also use an Army armoured recovery vehicle" under Wikipedia commons image (on this page captioned "A CRARRV on Salisbury Plain in 2008.") and there are no pictures of it in use.

== Operators ==
- United Kingdom - 80 in service, subsequently received Challenger 2 powertrain upgrades.
- Oman - 4 in service.
- Ukraine - Two CRARRVS were donated to Ukraine alongside a squadron of Challenger 2 tanks in 2023. Footage of these vehicles in service in the country has been posted on Ukrainian Telegram channels.

== Vehicles on display ==
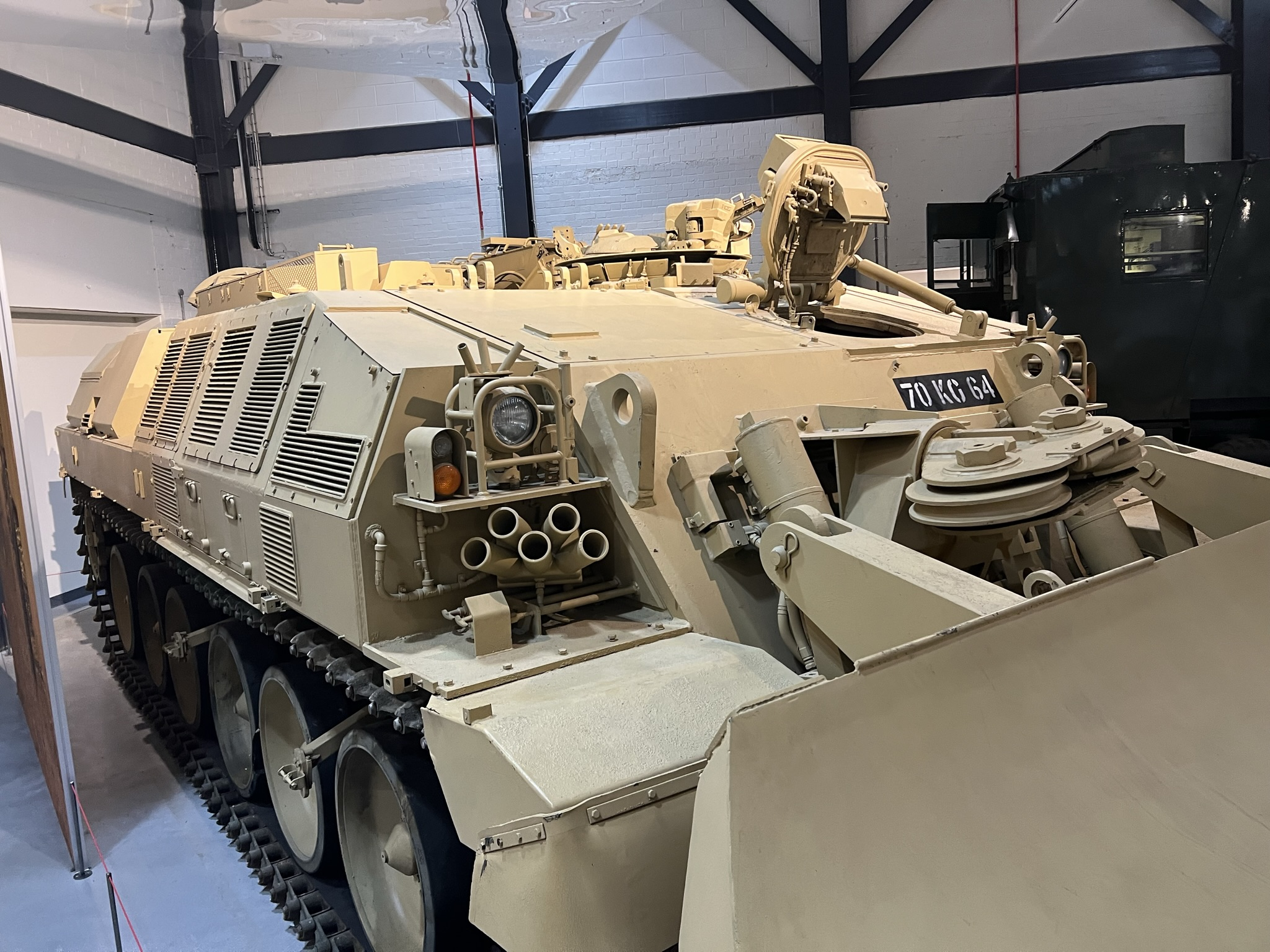
Prototype CRARRV at the REME Museum, MoD Lyneham

The prototype CRARRV is on display at The REME Museum at MoD Lyneham, Wiltshire.

== See also ==
- Challenger 1 - vehicle from which CRARRV was originally derived.
- Challenger 2 - CRARRVs subsequently upgraded to share a power train with this vehicle.
- Trojan Armoured Vehicle Royal Engineers - Challenger 2 derived combat engineering vehicle.
- M88 Recovery Vehicle - US equivalent.
