= Hathi (disambiguation) =

Hathi is an elephant character in Kipling's The Jungle Book.

Hathi may also refer to:

- Thornycroft Hathi, a 4x4 military lorry of 1924
- HathiTrust, a shared digital repository, including the Google Book Search project
- Haathi Parvat, a mountain peak in the Himalayas
- Elephant in Hindi
- The word 'hathis' is used in Kipling's 1890 Mandalay (poem), referencing elephants stacking teak logs.

== See also ==
- Humanities Advanced Technology and Information Institute (HATII), a research institute at the University of Glasgow
- Haathi Mere Saathi (disambiguation)
