= Beach armoured recovery vehicle =

British amphibious armoured recovery vehicle

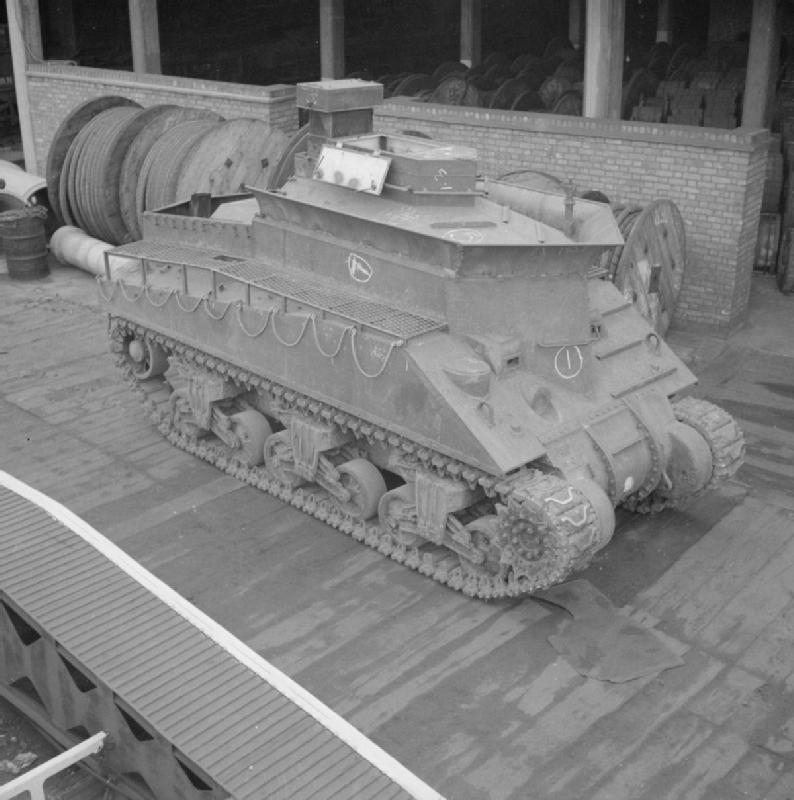
A Sherman BARV at Earl's Court in London, February 1944

A beach armoured recovery vehicle (BARV) is an armoured recovery vehicle used for amphibious landings.

There have been three different BARVs in British service since their introduction during World War II. They have also been used by Dutch and Australian forces.

== Sherman BARV ==
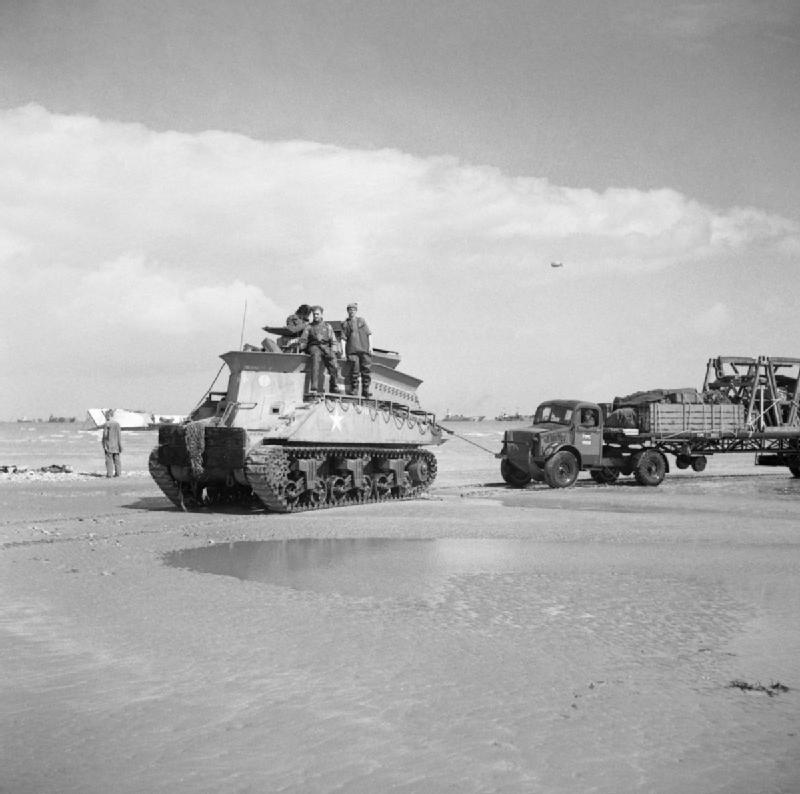
Sherman BARV tows a disabled truck and its load off the beach at Normandy, 14 June 1944

The original BARV was a Sherman M4A2 tank which had been waterproofed and had the turret replaced by a tall armoured superstructure. Around 60 were deployed on the invasion beaches during the Battle of Normandy. Able to operate in nine-foot (2.7-metre) deep water, the BARV was used to remove vehicles that had become broken-down or swamped in the surf and were blocking access to the beaches. They were also used to re-float small landing craft that had become stuck on the beach. Unusually for a tank, the crew included a diver whose job was to attach towing chains to stuck vehicles.

The vehicles were developed and operated by the Royal Electrical and Mechanical Engineers. The Sherman M4A2 model was chosen as a basis for the BARV as it was thought that the Sherman's welded hull would be easier to waterproof than other tanks. Unlike other Sherman models, the M4A2 was powered by a diesel engine because it was believed the tank would be less affected by the sudden temperature changes caused by the regular plunges into cold water. A few Sherman BARVs continued to be used until 1963, when they were replaced by a vehicle based on the Centurion tank.

== M3 BARV ==
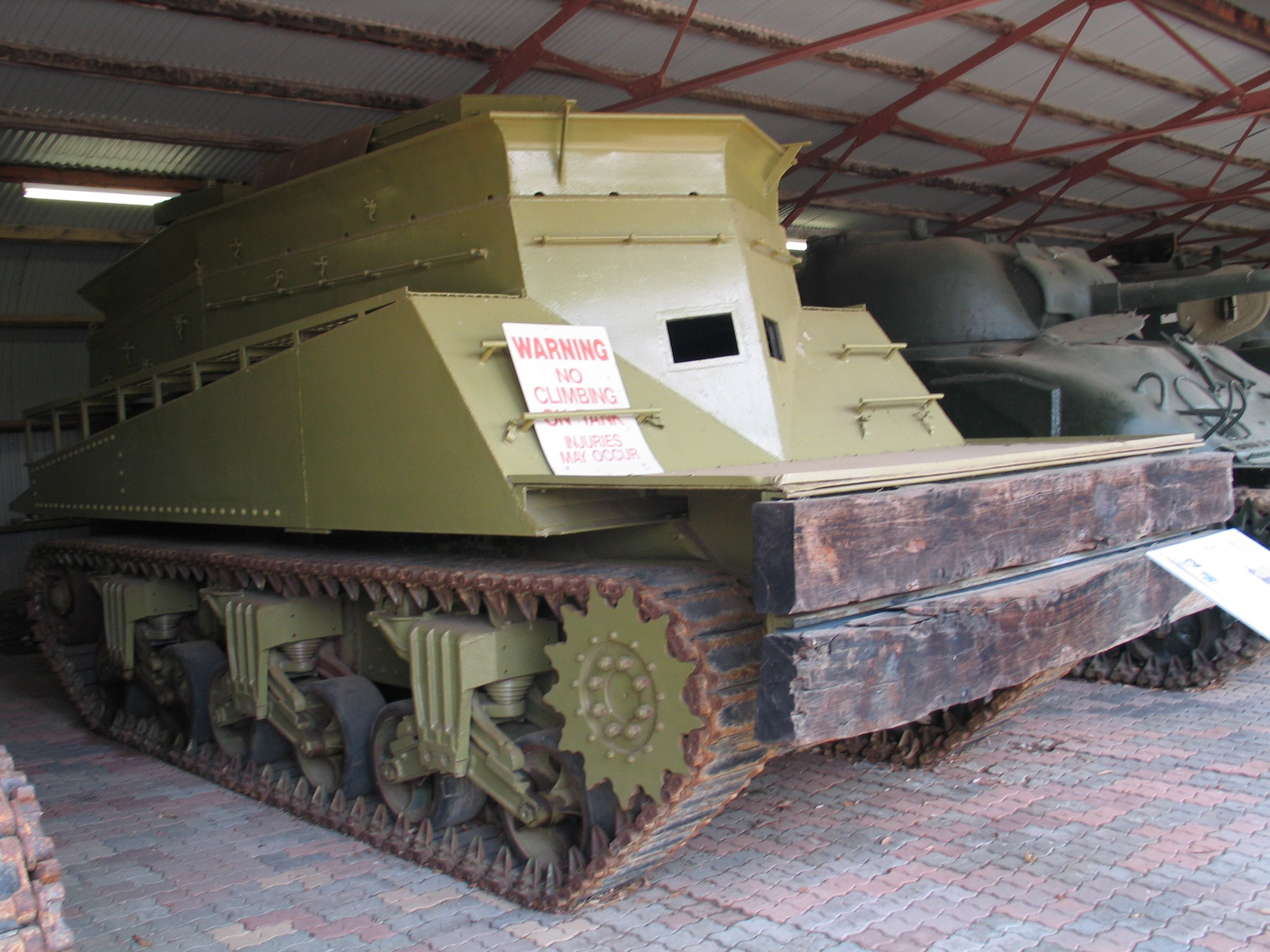
M3 BARV, Royal Australian Armoured Corps Tank Museum

A single M3A5 Grant tank was converted into a BARV in 1950 by the Australian Army. This remained in service until 1970.

== Centurion BARV ==
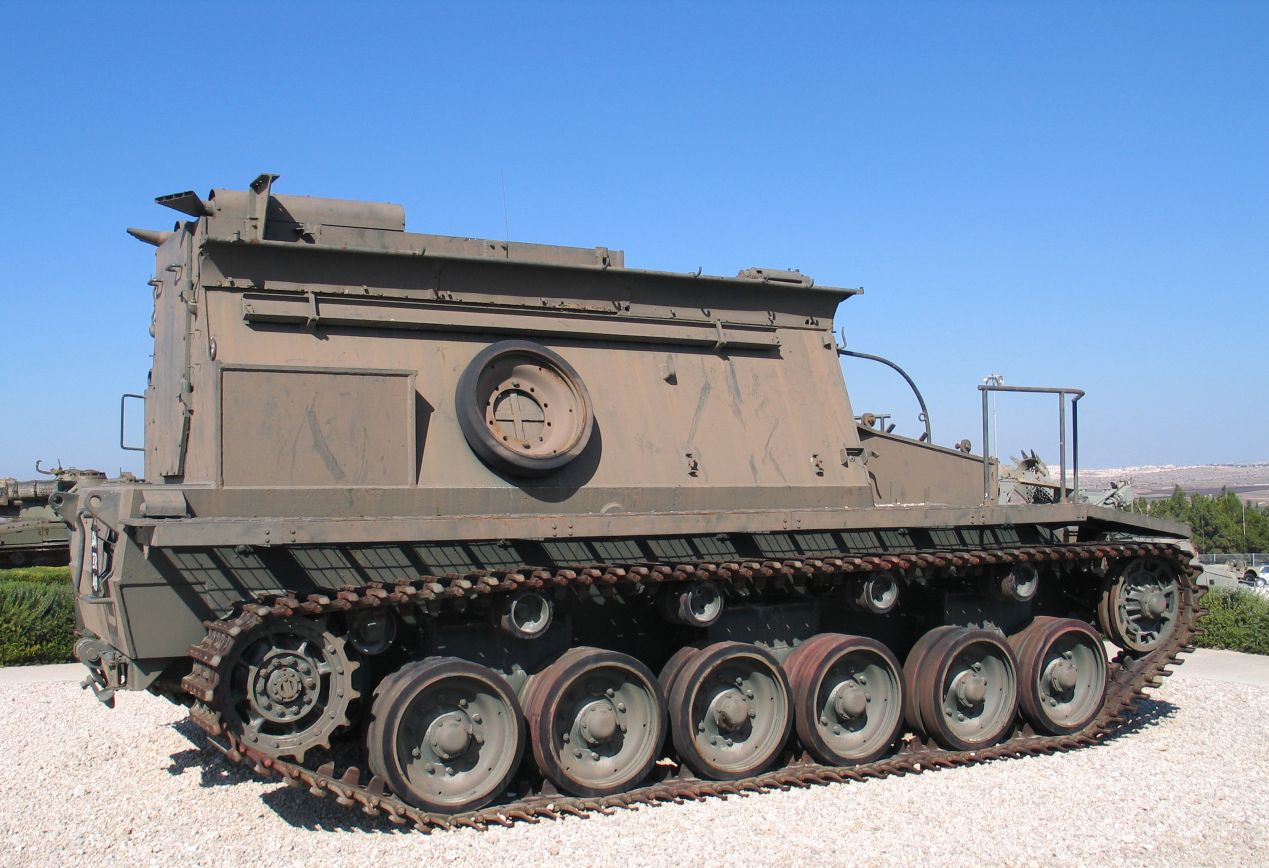
Centurion BARV at the Yad la-Shiryon Museum, Latrun, Israel (November 2005)

By the late 1950s, Sherman BARVs were becoming less useful as they were unable to recover the heavier armoured vehicles that were being introduced. The Centurion BARV FV 4018 was developed as a replacement. A mild-steel prototype was followed in 1960 by 12 production vehicles. These were based on the hulls of Mark 1, 2, and 3 Centurion tanks that by this time were redundant. Although initially assigned to the Army, they were passed to the Royal Marines when the Army's amphibious assault role was given to the Marines. The BARV was basically a Centurion body with built up sides to accommodate wading in water up to 11 feet. The design was functional yet crude with sloped armour built above the tank hull. The tracks for the BARV were reversed so they had better grip biting in reverse.

The Centurion BARV retained the gun-tank's Rolls-Royce Meteor petrol engine.

Centurion BARVs had a crew of four; two of the crew were members of the Royal Electrical and Mechanical Engineers, one of whom was a qualified diver. The Centurion BARVs were built to provide the essential role for the LPD's HMS Fearless and HMS Intrepid as part of the beach assault squadrons.

The assault squadrons were initially a mix of Royal Marines and Army serving aboard the ships. The transition to this being all Royal Marines was seen to be essential. The crew for the BARVs would be handed to the Royal Marines with a sergeant, two corporals and a marine, all qualified vehicle mechanics, responsible for driving and maintaining the tank, and also providing full mechanical breakdown services for all embarked vehicles. The training for the crew would take place at Bovington Camp for driver training and at the home of the BARV, RM Instow in North Devon, the Royal Marines' amphibious testing centre.

There were many occasions when the BARV would break down or get stuck. In 1981, the BARV from Fearless was to be lost at sea off Browndown beach to end up fully submerged. The following year both BARVs would see service during the Falklands War, being the largest land vehicles ashore, with the BARV from Fearless becoming stuck in deep mud whilst pushing an LCU Blue Beach. The vehicle was stuck in the mud for a few days, while a quillshaft (driveshaft between transmission and final drive unit) snapped during the recovery. The BARV from HMS Intrepid also became stuck in deep mud and suffered the same quillshaft failure and remained static for the duration of the war.

All the Centurion-derived BARVs have now left service and have been sold to collectors or museums around the world. BARV registration number 00ZR21 can be seen at the RAC Tank Museum, Bovington England.

== Hippo BRV ==
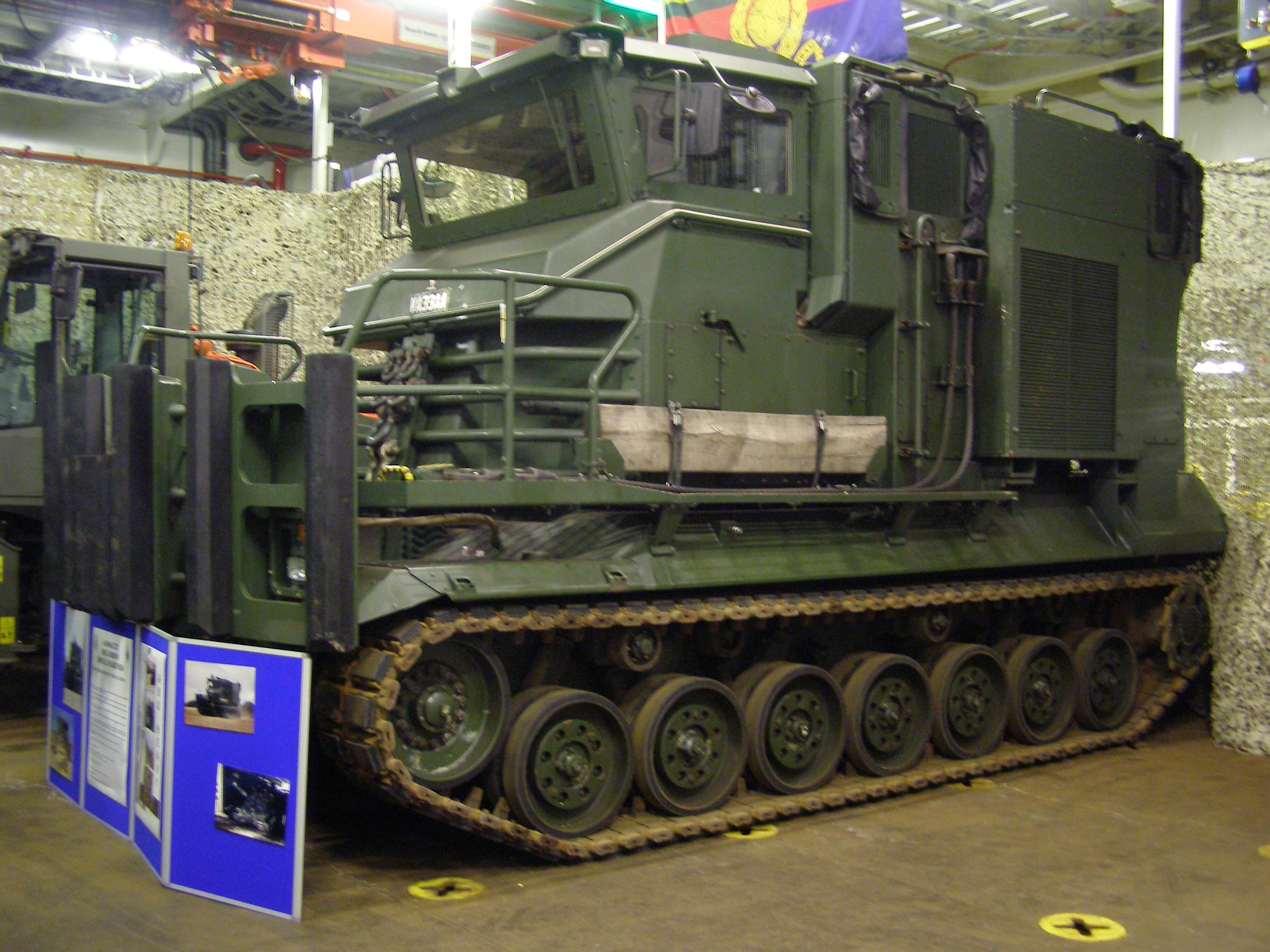
A Royal Marines Hippo BRV on board HMS Bulwark (2012)

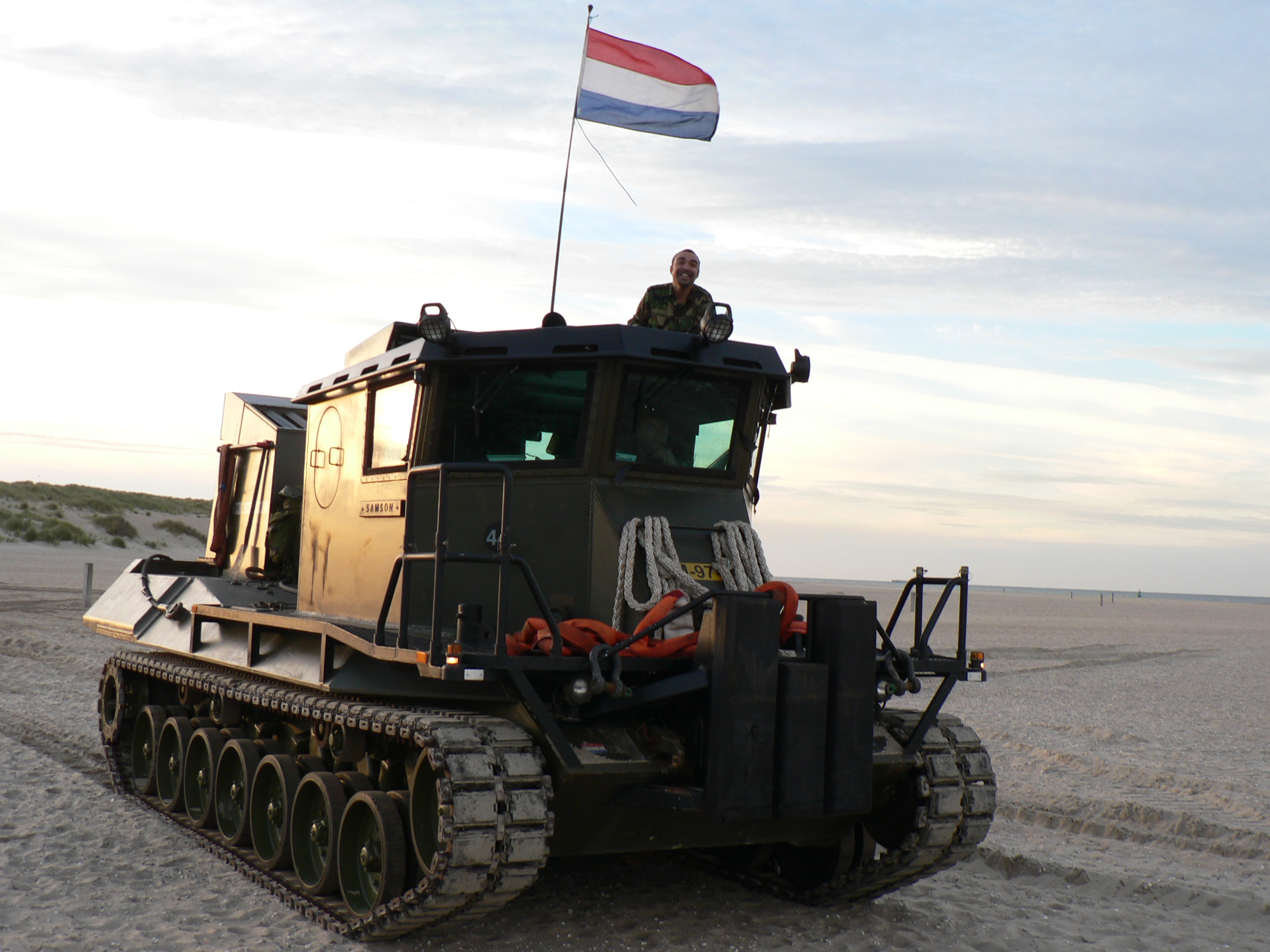
The Netherlands Marine Corps BRV Samson (2007)

In 2003, the Centurion BARV's replacement was introduced. This is the Hippo BRV, which had been in development under the project name of "Future Beach Recovery Vehicle" (FBRV). The name change reflects the fact that, unlike previous generations of vehicle used in this role, Hippos are not fully armored.

The Hippo is a conversion by Alvis Moelv of a Leopard 1A5 tank. The incorporation of Alvis Vickers into BAE Systems meant that elements of the work moved to BAE Land Systems, Sweden, formerly known as "Hägglunds", another ex-Alvis company. As with earlier generations of BARV, the main alteration has been the replacement of the turret with a raised superstructure which, in this case, resembles the bridge or wheelhouse of a small ship. The original 830-horsepower (620 kW) diesel engine has been retained but the gearing of the transmission had been lowered; this has reduced the vehicle's road speed from 65 to 20 kilometres per hour (40 to 12 mph), but its tractive force has been increased to 250 kilonewtons (56,000 lbf). Other modifications include the addition of working platforms, a nosing block, raised air intakes and an auxiliary power unit; this has raised the weight of the vehicle from 42.5 tonnes to 50 tonnes. The Hippo has a fording depth of 2.95 metres (9 ft 8 in) and can pull vehicles up to 50 tonnes weight or push off from the beach a 240 tonne displacement landing craft.

Currently, four Hippos are in British service, one each on HMS Albion and Bulwark, with two used by 11 Amphibious Trials and Training Unit Royal Marines. The vehicle is reportedly well liked by its users, but its lack of commonality with the other armoured vehicles used by the UK has caused spares support problems, exacerbated by the poor nature of the Initial Spares Support package procured from Alvis Moelv by the UK's Defence Procurement Agency. This area is being tackled by the MoD's Defence Logistics Organisation.

The Netherlands Marine Corps operates four similar Dutch Leopard 1V-based BRV vehicles known as Hercules, Samson, Goliath and Titan which operate out of the Royal Netherlands Navy assault ships of the Rotterdam class. The vehicles have a similar specification but a different cabin appearance.

== Survivors ==
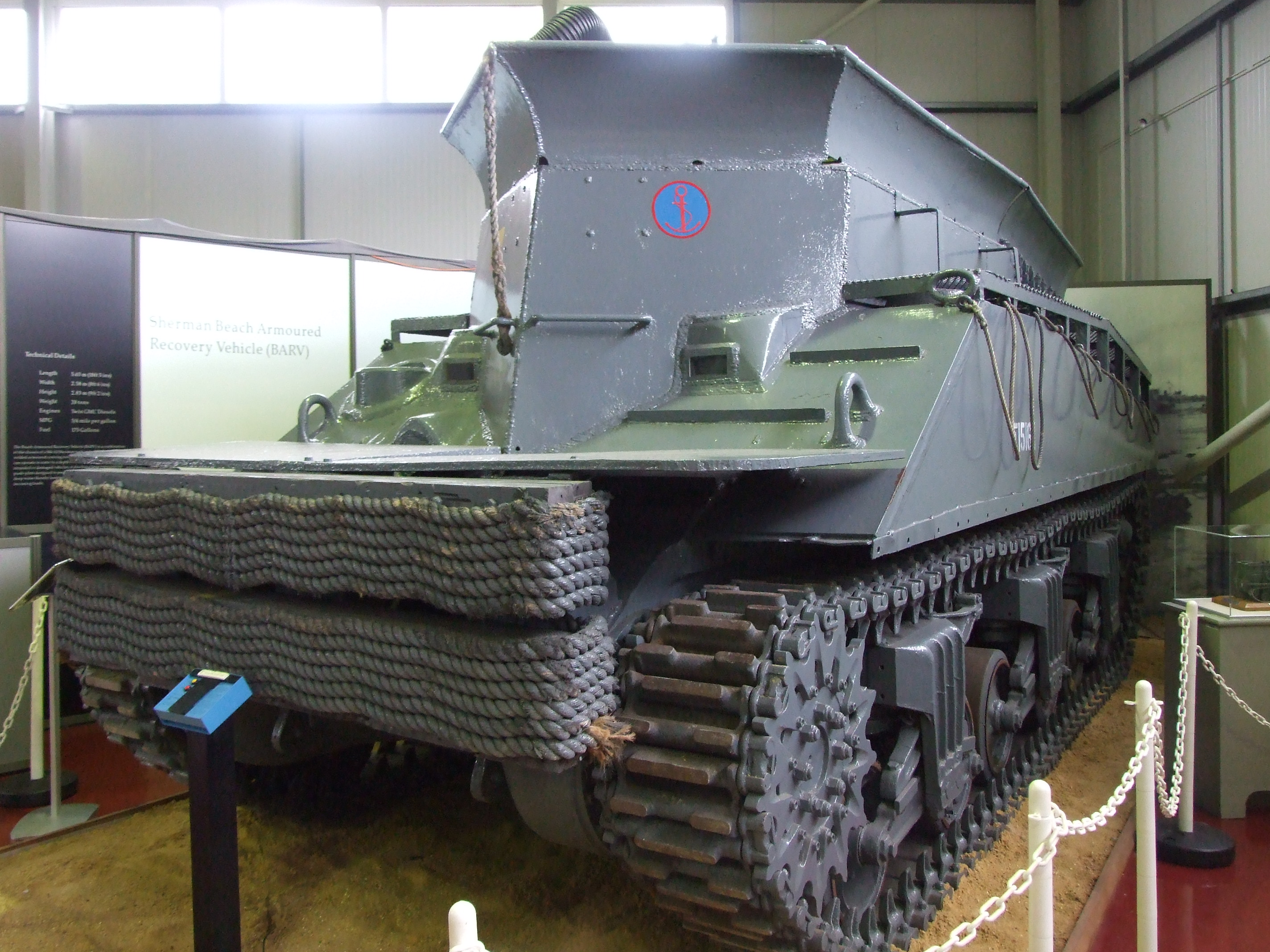
Sherman BARV, REME Museum of Technology, September 2010

In England, Sherman BARVs are preserved at the REME Museum in Lyneham and at the D-Day Story in Portsmouth. Another operational example is held by the War and Peace Collection, a private military collection in the UK. A damaged example, previously used as a range target, is held as a wreck at The Tank Museum. A further Sherman BARV is displayed at the Cavalry Tank Museum, Ahmednagar in Ahmednagar, India. The Royal Australian Armoured Corps Tank Museum at Puckapunyal, Australia, also preserves an Australian M3 BARV and a second example based on a bulldozer chassis.

Centurion BARVs are on display at: The Tank Museum Dorset, South West England, Yad La-Shiryon in Latrun (the IDF tank museum), and at the Israel Defense Forces History Museum (Batey ha-Osef) in Tel Aviv. A Centurion BARV in private ownership is parked at the entrance to a farm on Colne Road, Bures Hamlet, Essex.

Centurion BARV, serial number 02 ZR 77, is displayed at the South Yorkshire Aircraft Museum, Doncaster, as part of its Falklands War Collection. One of the earliest Centurions built under the first production contract between 1944 and 1946, it was one of two BARVs deployed during Operation Sutton, the British amphibious landings at San Carlos. It remains the longest-serving armoured vehicle in British service, only retiring in 2005 after deployment in both Gulf conflicts.
