= Hadrian's Camp =

- Houghton, Cumbria
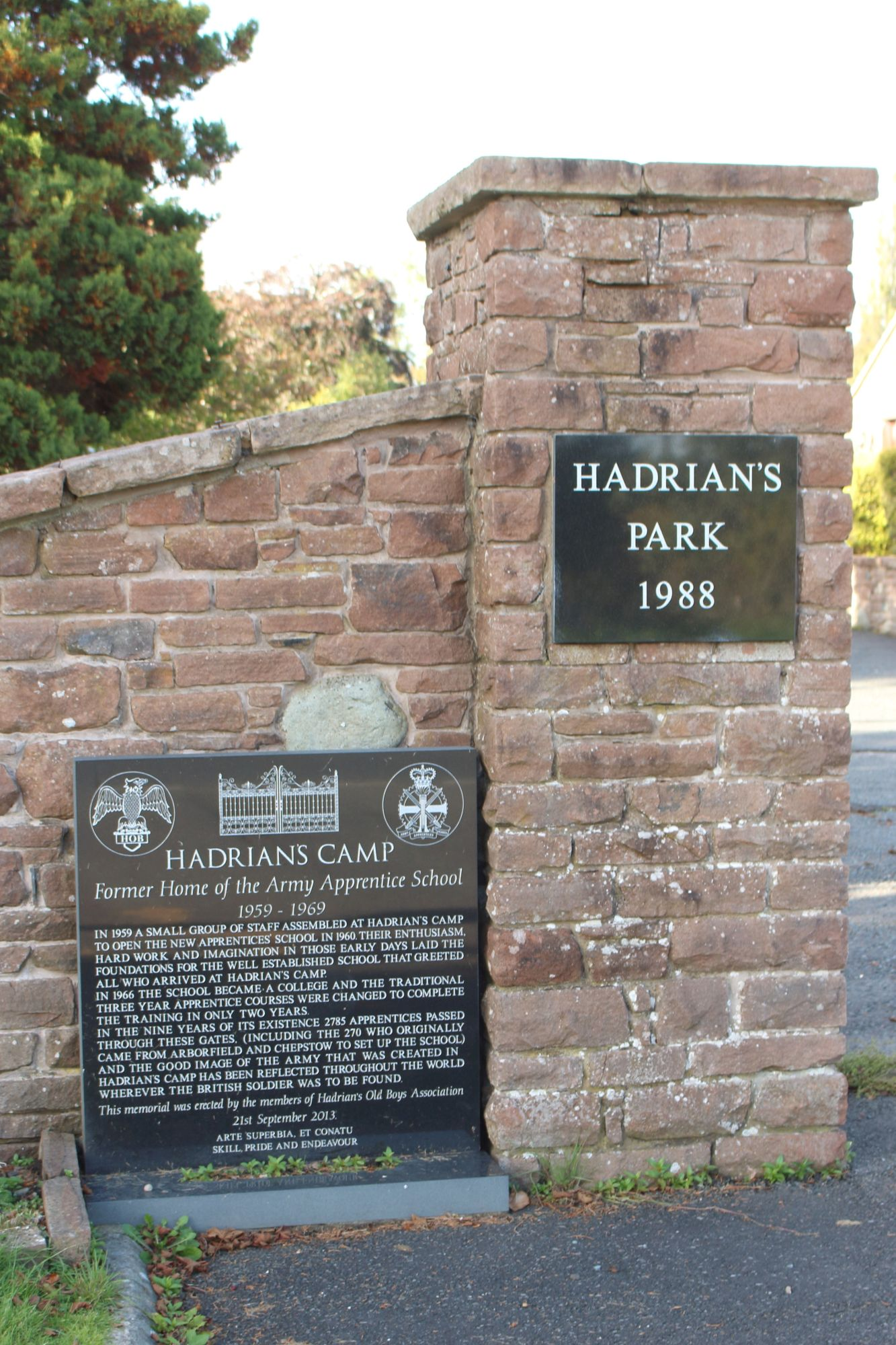
- Signs at Hadrian's Camp

Site information
- Type: Military Base
- Owner: Ministry of Defence
- Operator: British Army

Location
- Location within Cumbria
- Coordinates: 54.91814°N 2.91277°W

Site history
- Built: 1939
- Built for: War Office
- In use: 1939-1969

Hadrian's Camp was a military installation on the line of Hadrian's Wall at Houghton in Cumbria, England.

== History ==
The camp was established, in 1939, as a war-time training facility for the Royal Artillery during the Second World War. After the war the camp was used as a training facility for the Royal Armoured Corps. It became the Army Apprentices School for the Royal Electrical and Mechanical Engineers in 1959 and was re-designated the Army Apprentices College in 1966. After all REME apprentice training was transferred to Arborfield Garrison, the college at Hadrian's Camp closed in 1969. During the 1970s part of the site was converted by Cumbria Constabulary for use as a motor vehicle depot and, in 1988, the remainder of the site was allocated for use by gypsies, travellers and the homeless as "Hadrian's Park". Story Homes was given planning consent to develop the site for residential use as "Eden Gate" in January 2016.
