= David Eastman (British Army officer) =

British Army Veteran

Lieutenant General Sir David Eastman KBE
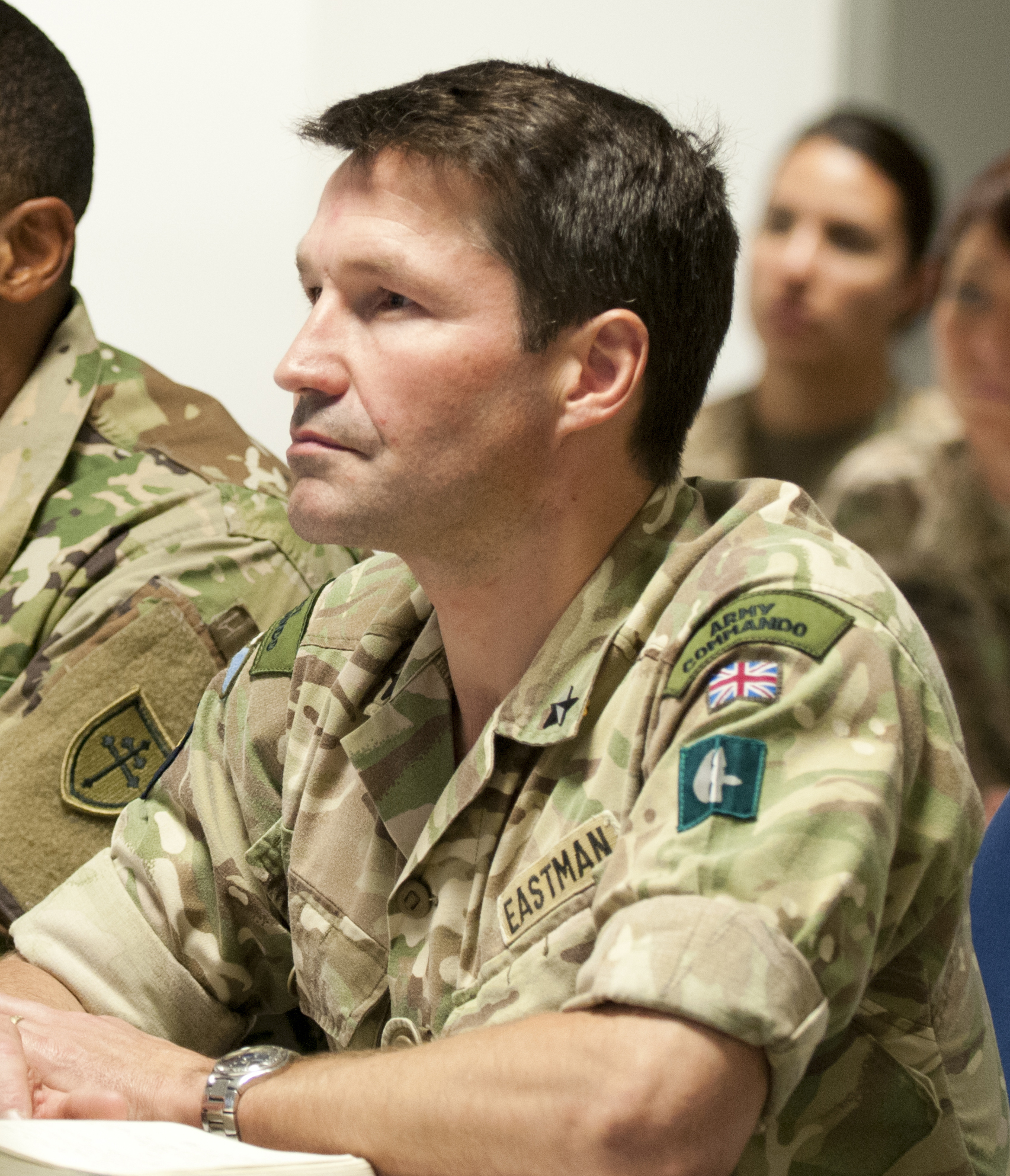
- Eastman in 2016
- Born: March 1970 (age 56)
- Military career
- Allegiance: United Kingdom
- Branch: British Army
- Service years: 1989–2026
- Rank: Lieutenant General
- Commands: Deputy Chief of the General Staff; Standing Joint Command (UK); Regional Command; 102nd Logistic Brigade; 2 Close Support Battalion REME
- Conflicts: Bosnian War; Kosovo War; Iraq War; War in Afghanistan
- Awards: Knight Commander of the Order of the British Empire

Lieutenant General Sir David James Eastman, KBE (born March 1970) is a former senior British Army officer. He served as General Officer Commanding Regional Command from February 2020 to July 2022, and as the Deputy Chief of the General Staff from June 2024 to April 2026.

== Personal life ==
Eastman was born in March 1970. He is married to Corina and they have four children.

== Military career ==
Eastman was commissioned into the Royal Electrical and Mechanical Engineers in 1989. After serving as Deputy Chief of Staff, 16 Air Assault Brigade from 2005 to 2006, he became commanding officer of 2 Close Support Battalion REME. He went on to be commander of the 102nd Logistic Brigade in September 2015, and Head of Military International Policy and Planning at the Ministry of Defence in May 2017.

Eastman was promoted to the substantive rank of major general on 14 February 2020, on appointment as General Officer Commanding Regional Command and Commander, Cadets. He temporarily held the appointment of Commander Standing Joint Command (UK) from 25 May to 7 September 2020 at the height of the pandemic. In September 2022, he was appointed Assistant Chief of the Defence Staff (Capability and Force Design).

In June 2024, Eastman was appointed Deputy Chief of the General Staff, with promotion to lieutenant general on 10 June 2024. He stepped down from this position in April 2026, and retired from the British Army on 27 August 2026.

Eastman was Master General REME from 1 April 2023 to 31 March 2026. He was also the Colonel Commandant of Royal Corps of Army Music until March 2026, and from 1 July 2024 to March 2026 he was Honorary Colonel of the Engineer and Logistic Staff Corps Army Reserve.

== Honours ==
Eastman was appointed a Member of the Order of the British Empire (MBE) in December 2006 "in recognition of gallant and distinguished services in Afghanistan during the period 1st April 2006 to 30th September 2006", and promoted to Knight Commander of the same Order (KBE) in the 2026 New Year Honours.

Military offices
Preceded by Duncan Capps	GOC Regional Command; 2020–2022	Succeeded by Jonathan Swift
Preceded by Hugh Beard	Assistant Chief of the Defence Staff (Capability and Force Design); 2022–2024	Succeeded by Tim Jones
Preceded by Dame Sharon Nesmith	Deputy Chief of the General Staff; 2024–2026	Succeeded by Simon Hamilton
