= Bohunt School Wokingham =

Secondary School in Arborfield Green, Berkshire, England

Location
- Remount Drive; Arborfield Green, Berkshire, RG2 9GB; England
- 51.37880°N 0.89495°W

Information
- Type: Academy
- Motto: Enjoy, Respect, Achieve
- Established: September 2016
- Local authority: Wokingham Council
- Trust: Bohunt Education Trust
- Department for Education URN: 142181 Tables
- Ofsted: Reports
- Head teacher: Jen Comber
- Gender: Mixed
- Age range: 11–16
- Enrolment: 1236 (2025)
- Capacity: 1200
- Colours: Green and black
- Website: Bohunt Wokingham

Bohunt School Wokingham is an 11-16 mixed secondary school with academy status in Arborfield Green, Berkshire, England. It was established in September 2016 and is a part of the Bohunt Education Trust.

== History ==
Built on the grounds of the old army garrison by the REME Museum, Bohunt School Wokingham is the newest school in the Wokingham Borough. By March 2015, plans for a new school were revealed. Bohunt School Wokingham opened in September 2016. Upon opening, it only opened to Year 7. Every year, the school's capacity grew by one year until the Year 7 students became Year 11s. The original building was previously used by the British Army. In September 2017, they opened the new building complex, costing £37 million to build.

A sixth form was expected to open in September 2023, however, funding problems had delayed the project. The sixth form, now called Bohunt Wokingham Sixth (BW6), is scheduled to open for September 2026, becoming the fifth in the borough. The new sixth form will take in around 300 pupils and will include additional special needs facilities for 150 more pupils of different year groups. Construction is expected to start on 16 June 2025 and finish on the 13th July 2026.

== Campus ==
The building complex comprises three interconnected wings containing classrooms and workshops, joined by two central hubs that house the cafeteria and library. Conceptual renderings of the Sixth Form extension, located on the southern wing, show a large reception area, a lecture hall and an outdoor eating area. Between the wings there are two quads and an amphitheatre to the east.

To the north lies the Arborfield Green leisure centre where indoor sports such as Rock Climbing, Badminton and Handball are played. Outdoors, there is a large Artificial turf football pitch, three tennis courts, and two netball/basketball courts, and a field that doubles as a running track, rounders field and other athletics sports. The school has multiple sports teams in a variety of different sports.

== Houses ==
The pupils are split up into a house system, consisting of five houses, each taking the name of an important person. These are:

- Bolt House after Usain Bolt
- Einstein House after Albert Einstein
- Madiba House after Nelson Mandela
- Nightingale House after Florence Nightingale
- Turing House after Alan Turing

The school operates a house competition in which students earn house points.

== See also ==
- Bohunt School
