= Arborfield Green =

Former military installation in Berkshire, England

Coordinates: 51.384204°N 0.896967°W

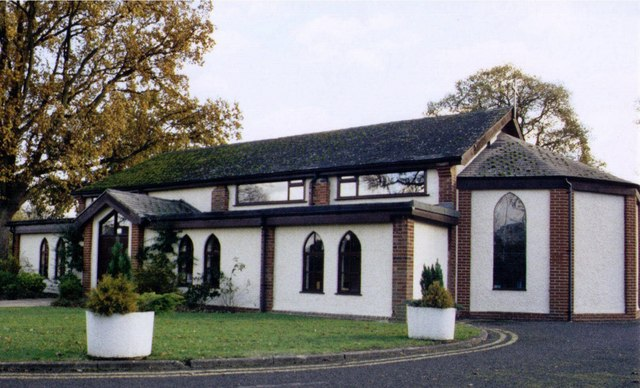
- St Eligius, Arborfield

- Location within Berkshire
- OS grid reference: SU767656
- Civil parish: Arborfield and Newland; Barkham; Finchampstead Swallowfield
- Unitary authority: Wokingham
- Ceremonial county: Berkshire
- Region: South East
- Country: England
- Sovereign state: United Kingdom
- Post town: READING
- Postcode district: RG2
- Dialling code: 0118
- Police: Thames Valley
- Fire: Royal Berkshire
- Ambulance: South Central
- UK Parliament: Wokingham

Arborfield Green is a new village approximately 1 mile (1.6 km) south east of the village of Arborfield Cross in the English county of Berkshire, previously a British Army garrison called Arborfield Garrison. The army vacated the site in 2015 and it is now being redeveloped for housing, with a total of 3,500 homes planned. The Garrison and its associated housing estates are split between the civil parishes of Arborfield and Newland, Barkham, Finchampstead, and Swallowfield. Both parishes are within the unitary authority of Wokingham. According to the Post Office, the majority of the 2011 Census population was included in the civil parish of Barkham. As of 2023, the new village centre is still under construction.

== History ==
The garrison, which was initially operated by the Army Remount Service and supplied the military with horses for both operational and ceremonial purposes, was established as the Remount Depot in 1904. The depot operated throughout the First World War and most of the inter-war period before closing in 1937. During the Second World War, part of the garrison functioned as the Army Technical School and the rest of the garrison was occupied by Royal Artillery units which moved out just prior to D-Day in June 1944.

After the war the south-west part of the garrison, known as Poperinghe Barracks, became the depot of the Royal Electrical and Mechanical Engineers ('REME'). The barracks consisted of wooden huts mostly grouped in 'spiders', each spider being made up of six huts joined by corridors to central washing and utility rooms. August 1955 saw one of the rare IRA 1950s attacks on mainland Great Britain when about a dozen men overpowered the unarmed sentries at the REME depot. A substantial quantity of weapons and ammunition was stolen but was recovered shortly afterwards. After the Army Apprentices College at Hadrian's Camp closed in 1969, all REME apprentice training was concentrated at Arborfield.

In July 2011, the then Defence Secretary, Dr Liam Fox, announced that RAF Lyneham would be the new site of the Defence Technical Training Change Programme (DTTCP) centre. This would coincide with the closures of Arborfield Garrison and the School of Electrical and Mechanical Engineering (SEME) at Bordon, with all posts at both bases moving to Lyneham in 2015. In 2016, planning permission was given to demolish many of the buildings and build a housing estate. The development will include 3,500 houses, retail units and a secondary school. Part of the Garrison was converted into the film studios Arborfield Studios. Bohunt School Wokingham opened in Arborfield Green in September 2016.

=== Reading F.C. ===
In 2004, Reading F.C. moved their training facilities to Hogwood Park, located within the garrison. However, they have since moved to Bearwood Park in Sindlesham.

== See also ==
- Units of the Royal Electrical and Mechanical Engineers
