= Leonard Atkinson =

Major-General Sir Leonard Atkinson KBE
- Atkinson in 1966
- Born: Leonard Henry Atkinson; 4 December 1910
- Died: 17 May 1990 (aged 79)

Major General Sir Leonard Henry Atkinson, KBE (4 December 1910 – 17 May 1990) was a British engineer and senior British Army officer. He served as Director of Electrical and Mechanical Engineering, and therefore head of the Royal Electrical and Mechanical Engineers, from 1963 to 1966. In retirement, he served on the board of a number of engineering companies, and was Master of the Worshipful Company of Turners (1987–1988).

Military offices
Preceded by Denis Redman	Director of Electrical and Mechanical Engineering; 1963 to 1966	Succeeded by A. McGill
