= Deputy Chief of the General Staff (United Kingdom) =

Deputy to the commander of the British Army

- Incumbent; Lieutenant General Sir Simon Hamilton since April 2026
- Army Headquarters; British Army
- Abbreviation: DCGS
- Member of: Army Board
- Reports to: Chief of the General Staff
- Nominator: Secretary of State for Defence
- Appointer: The Monarch; On the advice of the Prime Minister, subject to formal approval by the King-in-Council
- Term length: No fixed length
- Precursor: Vice Chief of the General Staff
- Formation: 1914, 2015
- First holder: Sir Henry Merrick Lawson
- Deputy: Assistant Chief of the General Staff

Deputy Chief of the General Staff (DCGS) is the title of the deputy to the Chief of the General Staff, the professional head of the British Army. From 1942 until 1968 the Deputy Chief was the third-ranking member of the General Staff, subordinate the Chief and Vice Chief. As of September 2015, the role of Deputy CGS is to be "responsible for representing the Army Top Level Budget (TLB) within Head Office and outwards to relevant TLBs and dependencies, provides oversight of the Army Operating Model and provides overall personnel policy direction as the Principal Personnel Officer (PPO)."

== Subordinate Commands ==
The commands under DCGS include:

- Director Reserves
- Director Support
- Director Personnel
- Director Resources - civilian post
- Assistant Chief of the General Staff
- Chaplain-General
- Director Basing and Infrastructure
- Director Army Legal Services
- Director Capability
- Director Information
- Director Engagement and Communications

== List of post-holders ==
Post-holders have been as follows:

=== Deputy Chief of the Imperial General Staff ===
- Major-General Sir Henry Lawson November 1914 – January 1915
- Lieutenant-General Sir Archibald Murray February 1915 – September 1915
- Major-General Sir Launcelot Kiggell November 1915 – December 1915
- Major-General Robert Whigham December 1915 – April 1918
- Major-General Sir Charles Harington 1918–1920
- Lieutenant-General Sir Philip Chetwode, 1920–1922
- Lieutenant-General Sir Ronald Adam 1938–1939
- Major-General Hugh Massy 1939–1940
- Lieutenant-General Sir Ronald Weeks 15 June 1942 – 29 May 1945
- Lieutenant-General Sir Sidney Kirkman 1945–1947
- Lieutenant-General Sir Kenneth Crawford 1947–1949
- Lieutenant-General Sir John Whiteley 1949–1953
- Lieutenant-General Sir Dudley Ward 1953–1956
- Lieutenant-General Sir Richard Hull 1956–1958
- Lieutenant-General Sir Harold Pyman 1958–1961
- Lieutenant-General Sir John Anderson 1961–1963
- Lieutenant-General Sir John Hackett 1963–1966
- General Sir Charles Harington 1966–1968
- Lieutenant-General Sir Ian Freeland April 1968 – December 1968

=== Deputy Chief of the General Staff ===
- Lieutenant-General Mark Poffley Spring 2015 – December 2015
- Lieutenant-General Nick Pope 2015–2019
- Lieutenant-General Christopher Tickell 2019–2022
- Lieutenant-General Dame Sharon Nesmith August 2022–June 2024
- Lieutenant-General David Eastman June 2024–April 2026
- Lieutenant-General Simon Hamilton April 2026–present
