= 5 Force Support Battalion REME =

- Active: Early 2000's–present
- Country: United Kingdom
- Branch: British Army
- Role: Equipment Support
- Size: Battalion; 461 personnel
- Part of: 102 Logistic Brigade
- Garrison/HQ: MoD Lyneham
- Engagements: Operation Telic

5 Force Support Battalion REME is a battalion of the Royal Electrical and Mechanical Engineers of the British Army.

== History ==
The battalion was formed in the early 2000's, at Catterick Garrison, from the grouping of a number of separate companies. The battalion deployed on Operation Telic II, in 2003, to support 19th Mechanised Brigade.

== Future Soldier ==
Under the Future Soldier reforms, the battalion is due to re-subordinate to 101 Operational Sustainment Brigade.

== Structure ==
The battalion's current structure is as follows:

- 1 Field Company
- 2 Field Company
- 15 Field Company
