= Denis Redman =

British Army officer

Major-General Denis Redman CB OBE
- Born: 8 April 1910; Rochester, Kent
- Died: 18 July 2009 (aged 99)
- Spouse: Penelope Kay
- Military career
- Allegiance: United Kingdom
- Branch: British Army
- Service years: 1934–1963
- Rank: Major-General
- Service number: 63651
- Commands: Corps of Royal Electrical and Mechanical Engineers
- Conflicts: World War II; Cold War
- Awards: Companion of the Order of the Bath (CB); Officer of the Order of the British Empire (OBE); Mentioned in Dispatches
- Other work: Military advisor civil servant

Major-General Denis Arthur Kay Redman, CB, OBE (8 April 1910 – 18 July 2009) was a senior British Army officer. He was Director of Electrical and Mechanical Engineering from 1960 to 1963 and therefore head of the Corps of Royal Electrical and Mechanical Engineers. He served as Colonel Commandant of REME from 1963 to 1968.

== Early life ==
Redman was born on 8 April 1910 in Rochester, Kent, England. His parents were Arthur, an officer in the Royal Engineers, and Vera Redman. He was educated at Wellington College, a private school in Crowthorne, Berkshire. He studied electrical engineering at the University of London, graduating with a first class degree. He then joined Midland Electric Light and Power Company. As an apprentice, he converted domestic houses from gas to electric lighting.

== Military career ==
Redman disliked his civilian career and left it to join the British Army. On 1 September 1934, he was commissioned into the Royal Army Ordnance Corps as a lieutenant (on probation). His commission and rank were confirmed on 1 May 1936. From 1936, he served in the Middle East.

He continued his service in the Middle East following the start of World War II. He was promoted to captain on 1 September 1940, and to major on 13 July 1941. He was appointed Deputy Assistant Quartermaster General at Middle East Command. On 1 October 1942, he transferred to the Corps of Royal Electrical and Mechanical Engineers. In 1943, he was appointed Assistant Quartermaster General at the War Office.

On 1 August 1948, he was promoted to lieutenant colonel. In 1951, he was appointed Deputy Director of Mechanical Engineering for the I Corps based in Germany as part of the British Army of the Rhine. He served in the post for two years. He was promoted to colonel on 15 February 1953. In 1957, he was appointed Commandant of the REME training centre, and served in that post for two years. He attended the Imperial Defence College in 1959. He was promoted to brigadier on 1 January 1960. On 29 June 1960, he was appointed Director of Electrical and Mechanical Engineering, therefore becoming head of REME, and made a temporary major general. He was later promoted to major general, which was backdated to 29 June 1960. He relinquished the appointment of Director on 4 July 1963.

He retired from the British Army on 1 August 1963.

== Later life ==
Following his retirement from the British Army, Redman worked at Sperry Gyroscope, an American equipment and electronics company, as a military advisor. He worked for the company for three years, before returning to the United Kingdom to become a civil servant. He was chairman of a number of civil service selection boards and also served as General Commissioner of Income Tax.

In 1980, he moved to Ramsbury, Wiltshire. Following his retirement proper, he turned his attentions to restoring and repairing antique clocks as a hobby. He was also President of his local Royal British Legion branch from 1984 to 1995.

He died on 18 July 2009.

== Personal life ==
In 1943, Redman married Penelope Kay. Together they had two children; Anne, born in 1944 and Jeremy, born in 1949.

== Honours and decorations ==
Redman was mentioned in dispatches 'in recognition of distinguished service in the Middle East (including Egypt, East Africa, The Western Desert, The Sudan, Greece, Crete, Syria and Tobruk) during the period February 1941, to July 1941'.

On 9 September 1942, he was appointed Officer of the Order of the British Empire (OBE) 'in recognition of gallant and distinguished services in the Middle East during the period November 1941 to April 1942'. In the 1963 New Year Honours, he was appointed Companion of the Order of the Bath (CB).

He served in the honorary position of Colonel Commandant of the Corps of Royal Electrical and Mechanical Engineers from 19 August 1963 to 19 August 1968.

Military offices
Preceded by Sir Leslie Norman Tyler	Director of Electrical and Mechanical Engineering; 1960–1963	Succeeded by Sir Leonard Henry Atkinson
