= REME Museum =

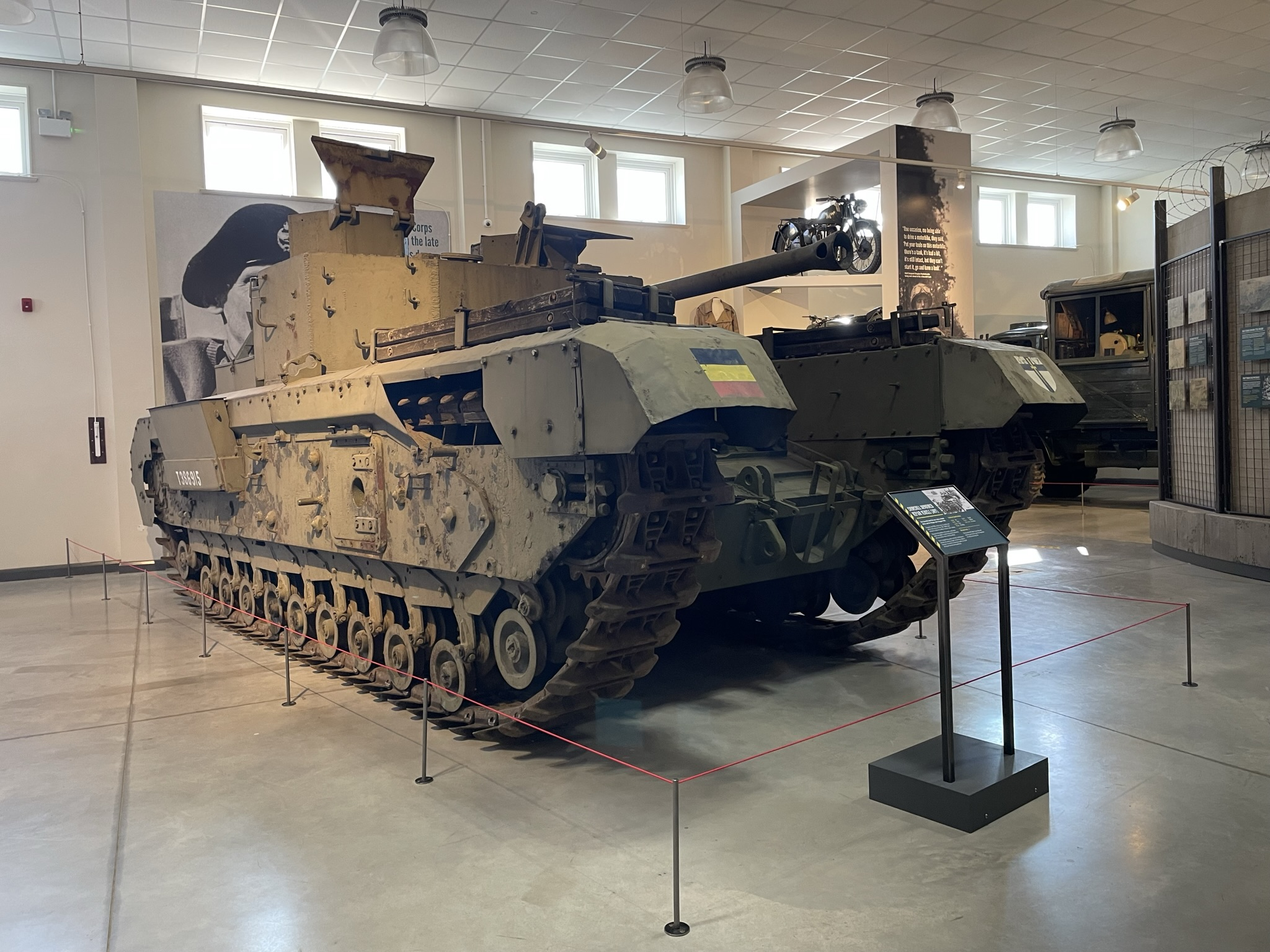
- Churchill Armoured Recovery Vehicle (ARV) in the World War Two Gallery of the REME Museum, Lyneham, Wiltshire.

- Location within Wiltshire
- Former name: REME Museum of Technology
- Established: 1958; 68 years ago
- Location: MoD Lyneham, Wiltshire, England
- Coordinates: 51°30′17″N 1°58′11″W
- Type: military museum
- Director: Maj (Rtd) R Henderson
- Website: www.rememuseum.org.uk

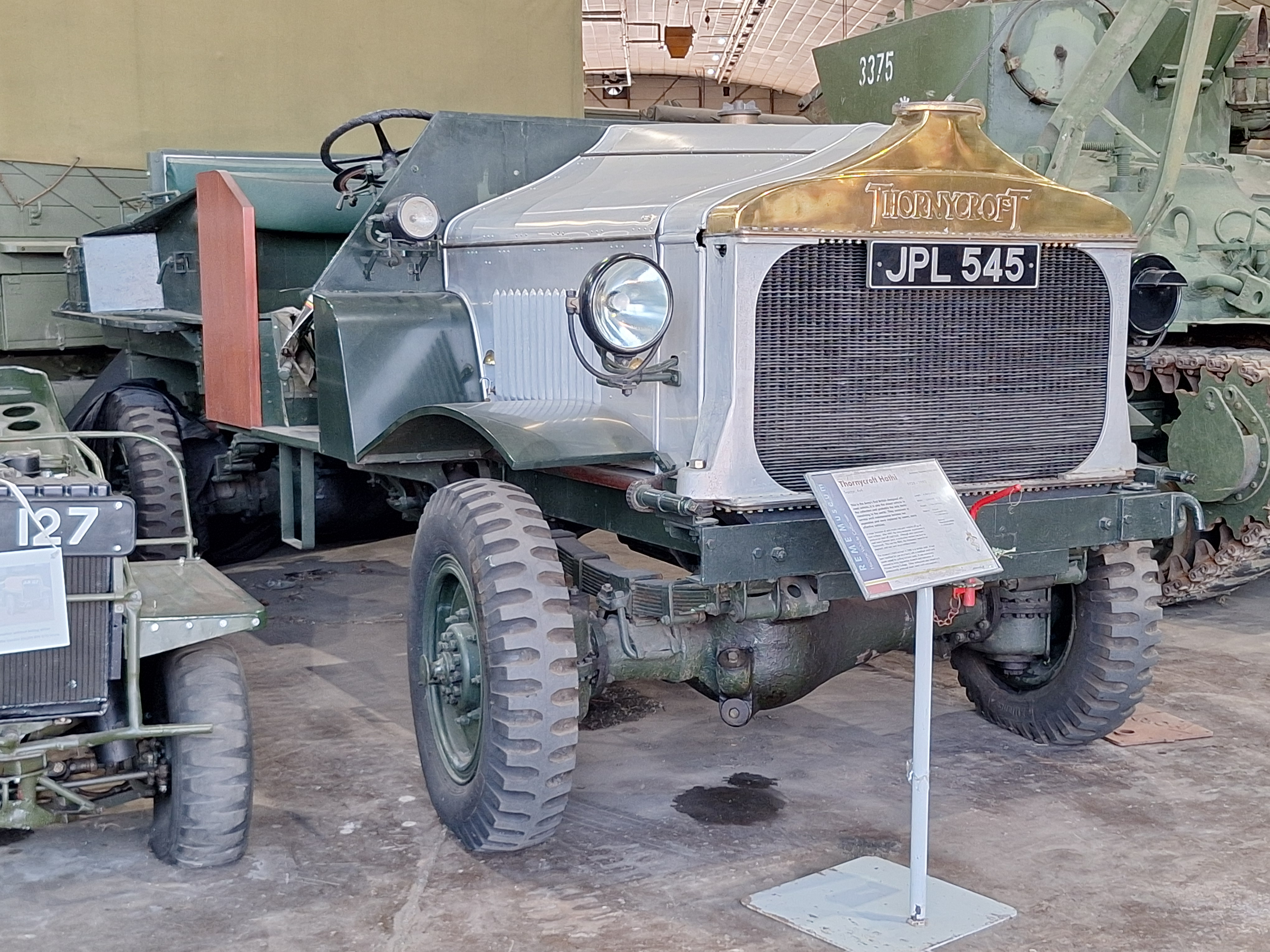
Preserved Thornycroft Hathi at the REME Museum Reserve Vehicle Collection in 2026.

The REME Museum, also known as the Corps of Royal Electrical and Mechanical Engineers Museum, is a military museum of the Royal Electrical and Mechanical Engineers (REME) – the corps of the British Army responsible for the maintenance, servicing, inspection, and recovery of electrical and mechanical vehicles and equipment. The museum holds collections of technological and historical artefacts associated with the work of the Corps of Royal Electrical and Mechanical Engineers.

The museum is within the MoD Lyneham site, near Lyneham in Wiltshire, England, about 9 miles (14 kilometres) south-west of Swindon.

== History ==
The REME Museum started in 1958 in Arborfield, Berkshire, in two rooms of Moat House, the former commander's accommodation of the Arborfield Army Remount Service Depot. Over time, the museum moved to a neighbouring building and expanded to allow more objects and vehicles to be displayed.

In April 2015, the museum closed in preparation for the relocation of the Royal Electrical and Mechanical Engineers from Berkshire to MoD Lyneham in Wiltshire, as part of the Defence Technical Training Change Programme. The former Royal Air Force Officers' Mess of RAF Lyneham was modified to provide a new home for the museum, which allowed a complete refresh of the displays and layout. The new museum opened to the public in June 2017.

== Collection ==
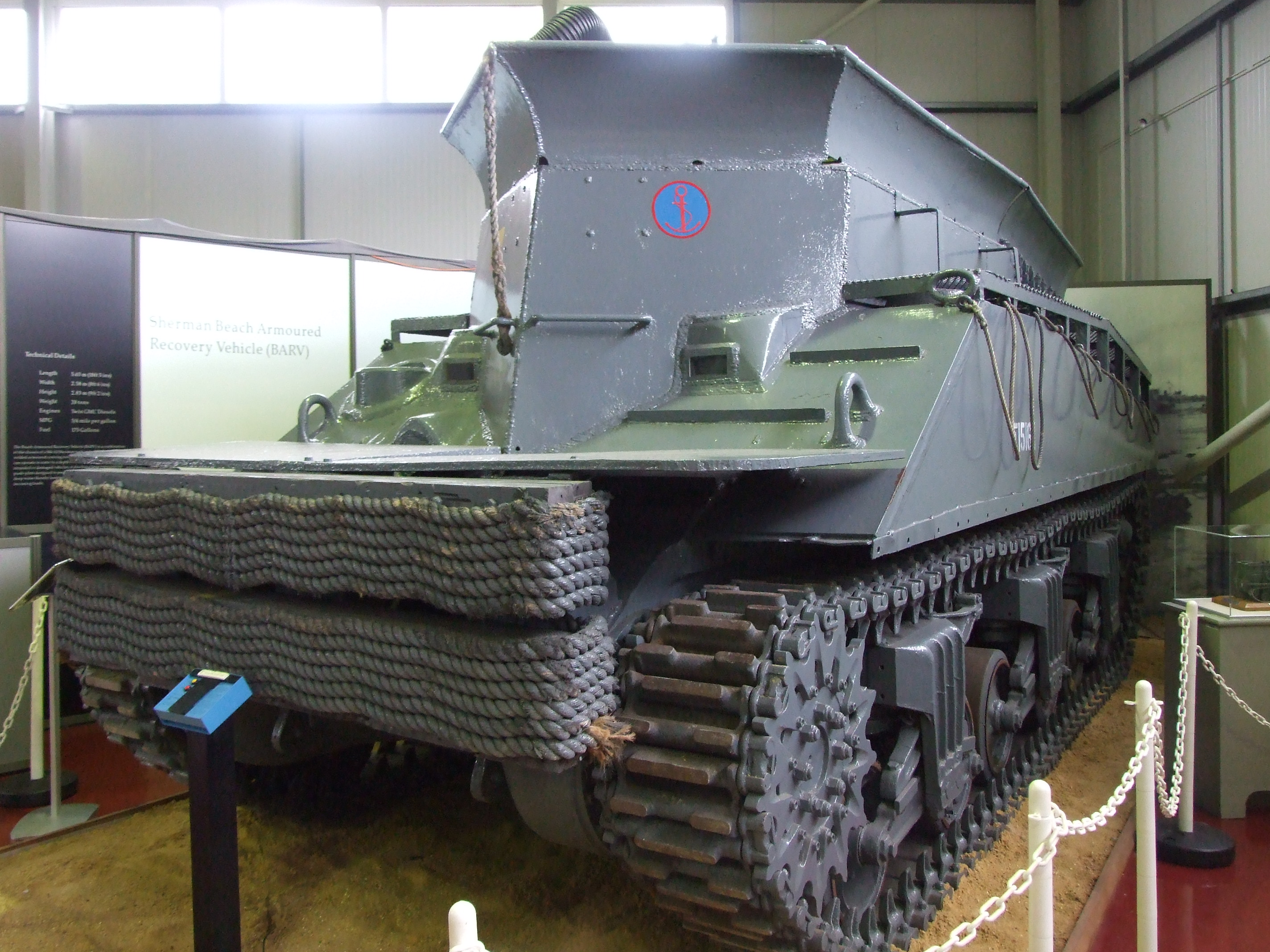
A Sherman Beach Armoured Recovery Vehicle (BARV) on display in the original museum, Arborfield, September 2010. The Sherman BARV was a British military support vehicle used for amphibious landings.

The following British Army military vehicles are on display:

Aircraft

- Westland Scout

Land vehicles

- Scammell Pioneer
- FV434 Armoured Repair Vehicle
- Sherman Beach Armoured Recovery Vehicle (BARV)
- Challenger Armoured Repair and Recovery Vehicle (CRARRV)
- FV106 Samson ARV
- International Half Track
- Morris Commercial
- Churchill Tank ARV
- Western Star
- Snow Trac

The museum is also the home to an extensive collection of military records. The museum building has a shop and a large café. An education suite with museum-led workshops is made available to schools and families. There are conferencing facilities and research visits can be made by appointment in advance.

== See also ==
- List of museums in Wiltshire
