= Simon Hamilton (British Army officer) =

British Army general

Lieutenant General Sir Simon Hamilton KBE
- Hamilton in 2026
- Military career
- Allegiance: United Kingdom
- Branch: British Army
- Service years: 1993–present
- Rank: Lieutenant General
- Unit: Royal Electrical and Mechanical Engineers
- Conflicts: War in Afghanistan
- Awards: Knight Commander of the Order of the British Empire

Lieutenant General Sir Simon Peter Hamilton KBE is a senior British Army officer. He has been appointed Deputy Chief of the General Staff since April 2026.

== Military career ==
On 14 April 1995, having attended the Royal Military Academy, Sandhurst, Hamilton was commissioned into the Royal Electrical and Mechanical Engineers, British Army, as a second lieutenant with seniority in that rank from 2 January 1993. He was promoted to lieutenant on 14 April 1995, with seniority from 2 January 1995. He was promoted to captain on 2 January 1998, to major on 31 July 2003, and to lieutenant colonel on 30 June 2009.

He was appointed Head of Vehicle Support at Defence Equipment and Support in 2017, the British Army's Director of Logistics Support and Engineering in 2019, and Director General Land at Defence Equipment and Support in 2024.

Hamilton went on to be Interim CEO at Defence Equipment and Support in October 2025. He was appointed Deputy Chief of the General Staff in April 2026. On 1 April 2026, he was appointed Master General of the Corps of Royal Electrical and Mechanical Engineers, the ceremonial head of the corps.

He was appointed a Commander of the Order of the British Empire (CBE) in the 2018 Birthday Honours. He was advanced to a Knight Commander of the Order of the British Empire (KBE) in the 2026 Birthday Honours, and therefore granted the title sir.

Military offices
| Preceded by Sir David Eastman | Deputy Chief of the General Staff; 2026–present | Incumbent |
