= 2 Close Support Battalion REME =

- Active: 1993–present
- Country: United Kingdom
- Branch: British Army
- Role: Equipment Support
- Size: Battalion; 278 personnel
- Part of: 101 Logistic Brigade
- Garrison/HQ: Leuchars Station, Fife
- Engagements: Operation Telic; Operation Herrick

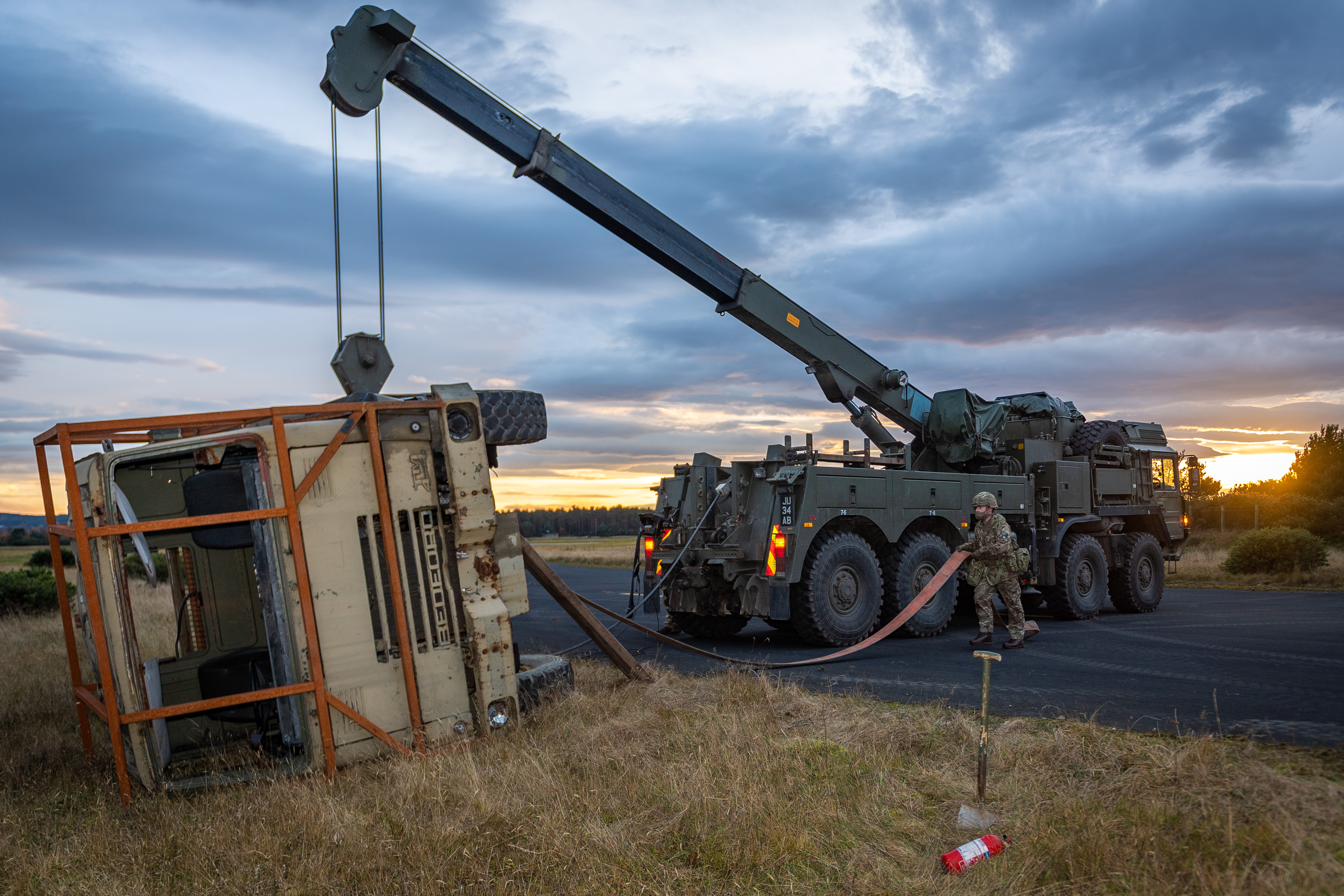
MAN SVR (support vehicle recovery) of 2 CSB on exercise in 2020

2 Close Support Battalion REME is a battalion of the Royal Electrical and Mechanical Engineers of the British Army.

== History ==
The battalion was formed in 1993, through the re-designation of 7 Armoured Workshop, at St Barbara Barracks, Fallingbostel. The battalion's initial role was supporting 7th Armoured Brigade, just like its predecessor unit did.

Under the Future Soldier reforms, the battalion is due to be re-designated as 2 Force Support Battalion, and transfer from the close support to the divisional support role.

== Structure ==
The battalion's current structure is as follows:

- 7 Close Support Company
- 11 Close Support Company
