= Haathi Mere Saathi =

Haathi Mere Saathi (lit. 'Elephant My Friend') may refer to:

- Haathi Mere Saathi (1971 film), a 1971 Indian film about Indian elephants by M. A. Thirumugham
- Haathi Mere Saathi (1993 film), a 1993 Pakistani film by Shamim Ara
- Haathi Mere Saathi (2021 film), a 2021 Indian film about an animal rights activist by Prabhu Solomon
