= Thornycroft Hathi =

British four wheel drive artillery tractor

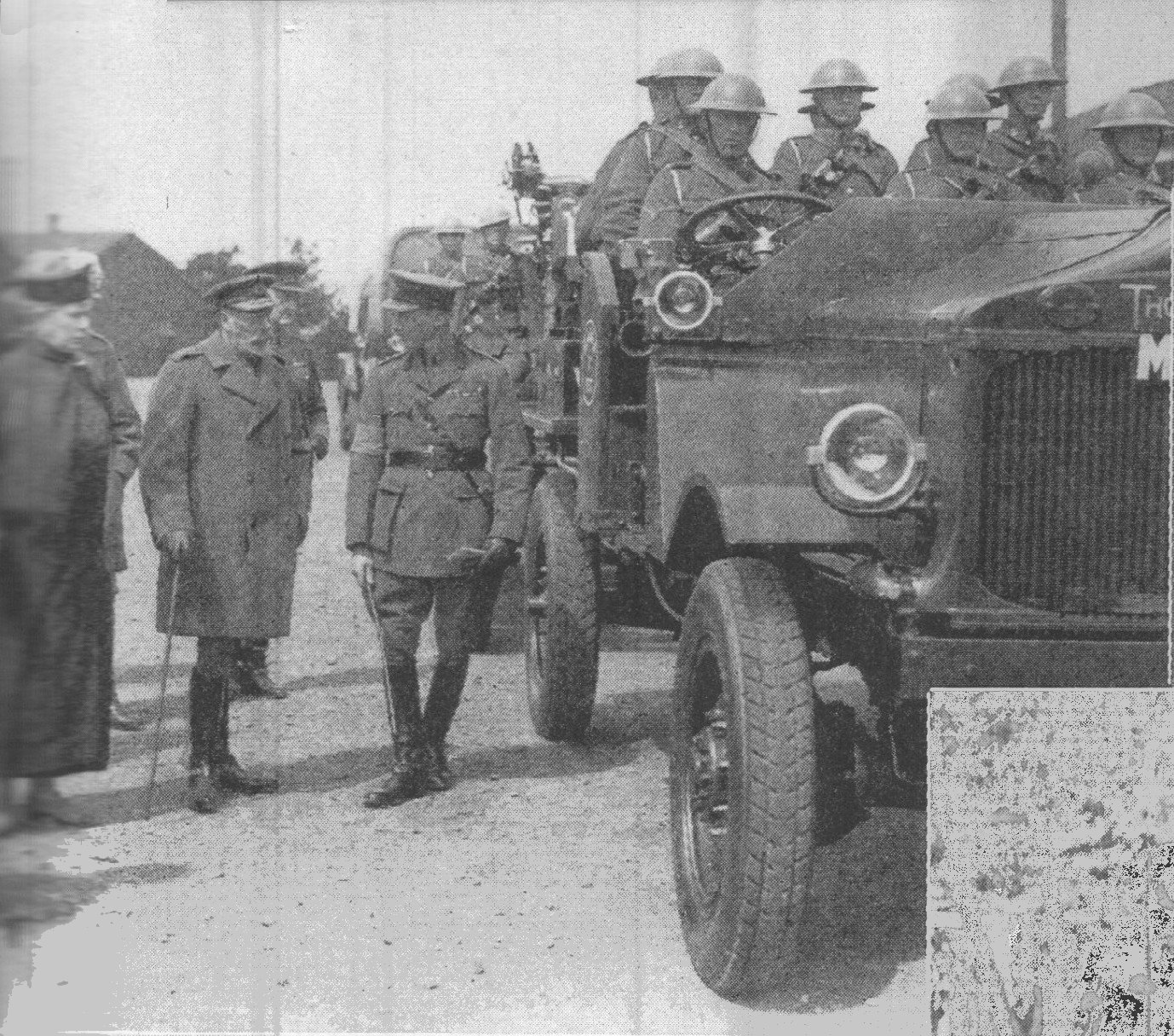
King George V inspecting a mechanized machine gun detachment in 1928

The Thornycroft Hathi (Hindi: "elephant") was an early four wheel drive lorry built by Thornycroft in the 1920s. It was used by the British Army as an artillery tractor.

== Development ==
There was a lack of British-developed four-wheel-drive vehicles developed during the First World War and no commercial demand for them afterwards. As a result, the British Army, under the time's general assumption of indigenous sourcing, was forced to develop its own vehicle. The Hathi prototype was developed in 1922 by a team of P Company under Professor (honorary Colonel) Herbert Niblett DSO of the Royal Army Service Corps' Training College at Aldershot, using parts of a German Erhardt tractor. Production models were built by Thornycroft, 25 being built in 1924. Niblett was Sir John Isaac Thornycroft's son-in-law.

Although capable for its day, the Hathi was a complex and expensive vehicle that required regular maintenance if the front axle was to remain reliable. For most purposes it was soon replaced by 6×4 lorries with just as many driven wheels, but without the need for the complex combined driving and steering axle. Even half-tracks, particularly the Kégresse system, were more popular in this period.

== Requirements ==
The first vehicle was built as an experimental prototype, but its success was so great that plans were made to produce them commercially. The specification of requirements was thus drawn up in October 1923, after the prototype had been trialled. These were:

- Engine power of at least 80 bhp (60 kW)
- Winch capacity of 5 long tons (5.1 t)
- Ability to cope with a 1 in 4 (25%) gradient, whilst towing a trailer load of 5 long tons
- Ability to stop and start under control on a 1 in 5 gradient (20%)
- Average speed of 22 mph (35 km/h) over two hours.
- A ground clearance of 20 in (510 mm) in general, with at least 10 in (250 mm) beneath the axles. The vehicle otherwise to be low in overall silhouette.
- Turning circle of 55 ft (17 m). This required a short wheelbase, but the ditch and bank climbing requirements also limited the vehicle's overhang beyond its wheels. Together with the weight limit, this required an extremely compact vehicle.
- Maximum weight of 5 long tons.

== Construction ==
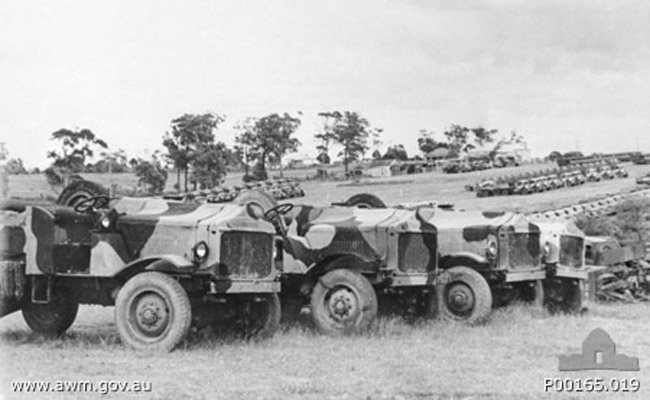
De-mobilised Hathi in Australia in 1945

The bodywork of the Hathi was typical for the time with a wide bench seated open cab and no windscreen. The only weather protection was a folding canvas roof. Although the lack of cab was typical for the time, it had also been part of the requirement to maintain a low profile.

As with other Thornycroft vehicles the radiator surround was a massive casting (in aluminium, to save weight) topped by a brass header tank with the "Thornycroft" name prominently cast into it. A distinctive feature of the Hathi, appropriately giving its elephantine appearance, was the extreme width of the bonnet. The top panels of the bonnet cover were also noticeably concave and are recognisable in photos.

Prominent spare wheels were mounted high up, on each side of the rear bodywork.

=== Engine ===
The engine was a Thornycroft GB6 11.3 litre straight-six petrol engine. As was common for the period, the cylinders were cast in two blocks of three. The valve arrangement was inlet over exhaust, with inlet valves in the cylinder head and side-valves in the cylinder block for the exhaust. Dry sump lubrication was used, to avoid problems when tilted off-road. To reduce weight, many cast components were in aluminium, rather than iron.

=== Transmission ===
Four wheel drive for heavy vehicles in this period was difficult and the Hathi used a complex arrangement of bevel gears to transmit drive through the steering joints of the front axle. Rather than the now–common system of articulated drive shafts to the front hubs (the shaft either inside an axle casing or external), fixed shafts were used. Shafts inside the axle casing carried power to the ends of the axle, then a bevel gear drove a short vertical shaft running through the steering kingpin. A further bevel on the outer part of the hub carrier (the part moving with the steering) drove the hub itself. To save weight, the axle casings were cast in aluminium.

The constant velocity joint used to make modern articulated drive shafts was unheard of as yet and even the simpler Hooke-type universal joint wasn't yet in common use. Thornycroft's usual practice for prop shafts at the time was to use a flexible leather disk joint.

=== Wheels ===
Production Hathi used single steel disk wheels with 8 studs. The tyres were narrow by modern standards for an off-road vehicle and did not have the exaggerated tread pattern now common, or the bar grip pattern used during the WWII period.

To provide a greater grip, typical experiments for the period were carried out, with double wheels and tyres fitted and with cleated tyre chains over these. The doubled wheels used a different wheel from standard, with a greater offset.

=== Drawbar and winch ===
The Hathi introduced a number of innovations that would become standard on military tractors in later years, including the Scammells.

The rear towing draw-bar consisted of a multiple-leaf horizontal leaf spring, spanning the rear chassis rails. This coupled the towing forces directly into the chassis, but also allowed jolts to be cushioned.

When winching, the Hathi was fitted with chassis-mounted scotches that hinged down to hold the vehicle in place against the ground. These were stronger than chocking the wheels, quicker to deploy and also carried the winching forces directly into the chassis, rather than through the suspension. These were an innovation of the production Hathi, the prototype vehicle instead having used a precarious arrangement of wheel ramps that lifted the rear of the vehicle off the ground.

== Experimental developments ==
=== 6×6 ===
A single 6×6 Hathi was produced as an experiment. This was a new build vehicle, with a redesigned chassis. Once again, this was produced by P Company of the RASC Experimental Department. It was tested by the MWEE in May 1928. Double wheels were used with optional chains. As would later be used on other 6×4 vehicles, the single rear chains spanned both axles.

Although successful in its trials, the 6×6 bogie suspension was the victim of its own success. The WD's development of its patented rear bogie suspension allowed 6×4 vehicles to be built on a commercial chassis, avoiding the complexity of the Hathi's driven front axle. Such vehicles had almost as good cross-country performance as the all-wheel-drive 6×6, but at lower cost and with the use of mass production commercial lorry factories, not military vehicle specialists.

=== Half-track ===
The Royal Marines also tested a single example of a half-track Hathi conversion, using tracks by the Roadless company. This was a relatively simple conversion, a Roadless speciality, using the existing rear axle of the Hathi as a combined drive sprocket and road wheel, with a two-wheel bogie and roadwheel idler ahead of this.

== Service career ==
Initial production was as an artillery tractor, as at this time the RASC supplied transport to the Royal Field Artillery. Very few Hathi were built, possibly just the original batch of 25. It was used with artillery such as the QF 3-inch 20 cwt anti-aircraft gun.

In 1926, at least one Hathi was converted as a breakdown recovery vehicle. A fixed jib with a small hand-operated winch was mounted on the rear deck, with the frame for a canvas tilt over it. Other examples were converted for the Royal Air Force and the Royal Navy, a naval example from Portsmouth Dockyard being the survivor today.

Eight Hathi gun tractors were procured in 1925 along with five light trucks as part of token move towards mechanisation; Harry Chauvel, Inspector General and 1st Chief of the General Staff of the Australian Army proclaiming that "mechanization has been effected". They were being used in the early 1930s in Northern Australia.

Hathi were still in reserve service in Australia in 1945.

== Surviving units ==
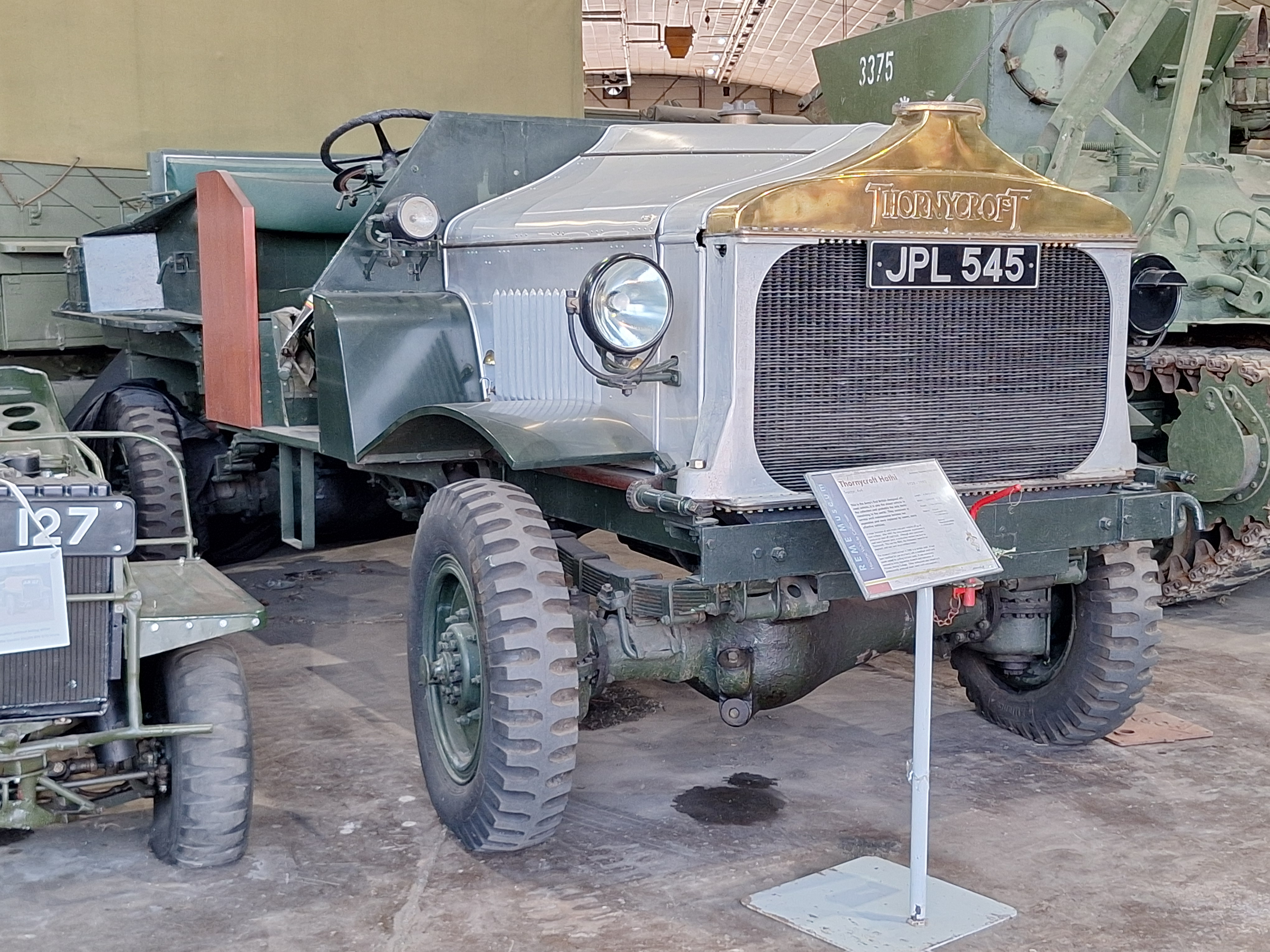
Preserved Thornycroft Hathi at the REME museum reserve collection in 2026

A single example survives today, in the collection of the REME Museum - although it is not on regular display.

== See also ==
- Four Wheel Drive, a contemporary maker of four-wheel drive lorries
