= MOD Lyneham =

Ministry of Defence site in Wiltshire, England

MOD Lyneham Prince Philip Barracks
- Lyneham, Wiltshire in England
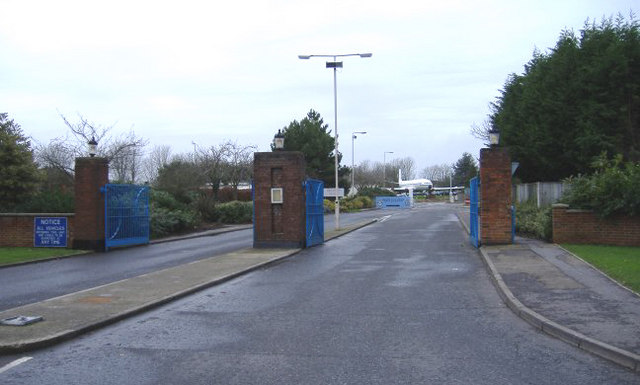
- The main entrance to MOD Lyneham

Site information
- Type: British Army training establishment
- Owner: Ministry of Defence
- Operator: British Army
- Controlled by: Royal Electrical and Mechanical Engineers

Location
- Location in Wiltshire
- Coordinates: 51°30′19″N 001°59′36″W
- Area: 494 hectares

Site history
- Built: 2015
- In use: 1939–2012 (Royal Air Force); 2015–present (British Army)

Garrison information
- Garrison: Defence School of Electronic and Mechanical Engineering (DSEME)

Ministry of Defence Lyneham or MOD Lyneham is a Ministry of Defence site in Wiltshire, England, about 7 miles (11 km) north-east of Chippenham and 10 miles (16 km) south-west of Swindon. The site houses the Defence School of Electronic and Mechanical Engineering. Also here is Prince Philip Barracks, housing the regimental headquarters of the Royal Electrical and Mechanical Engineers (REME), 8 Training Battalion REME and the REME Museum.

Previously, the site was RAF Lyneham which closed on 31 December 2012.

== History ==
=== RAF Lyneham ===
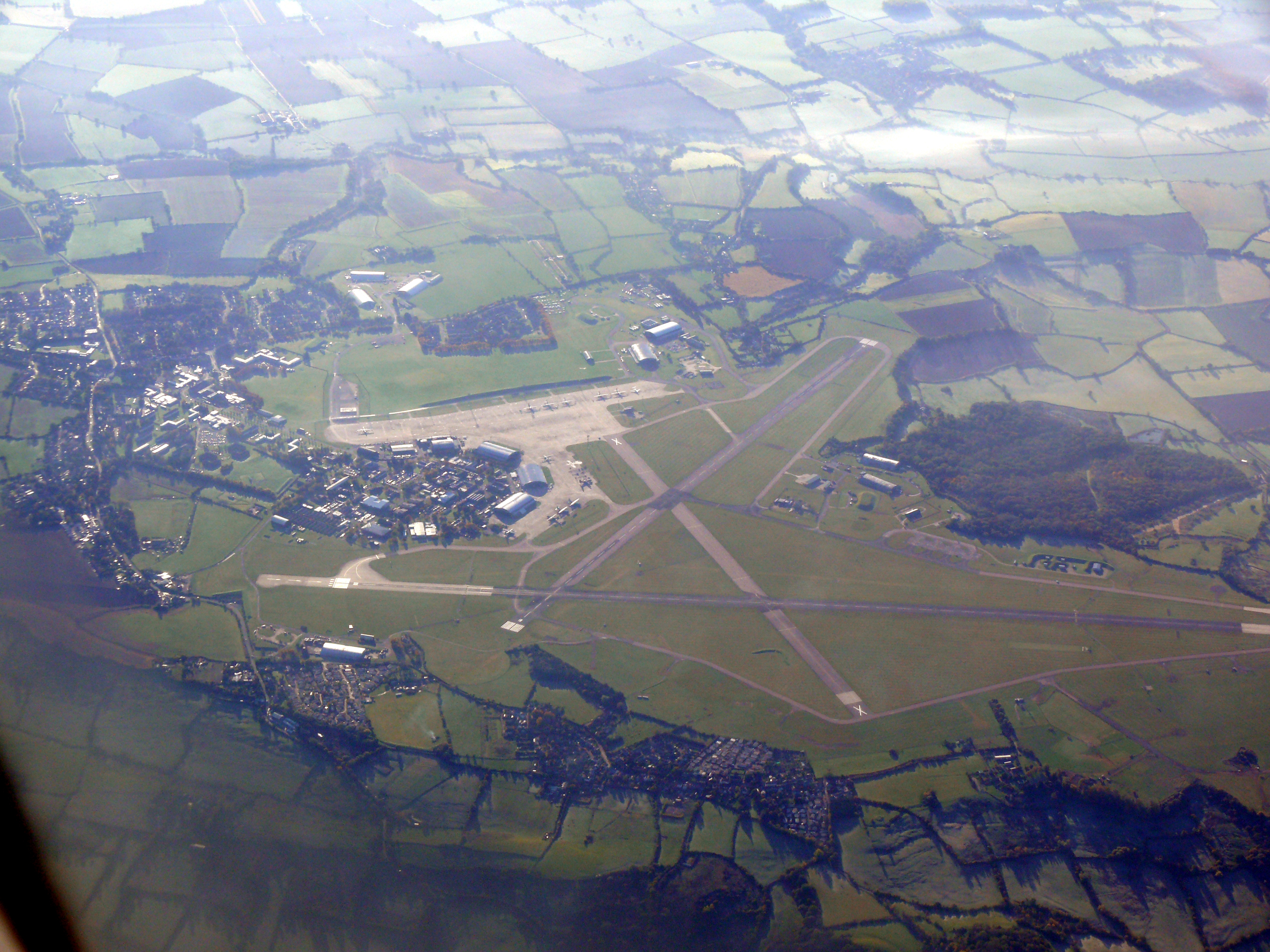
Aerial view in 2010

RAF Lyneham was built in 1939, initially as a grass landing area although the RAF always planned to lay hard runways. Hangars and other buildings were dispersed around the site to avoid creating one large target for an aerial enemy.

The station was opened on 18 May 1940 as No. 33 Maintenance Unit (33MU). During the war, the station's squadrons operated regular transport schedules to Gibraltar.

In 1971 five Hercules squadrons were based at Lyneham, as well as a VIP transport Comet squadron, and in 1976, the station became the largest operational airfield in the RAF with the arrival from Cyprus of Hercules-equipped No. 70 Squadron RAF (LXX Sqn), bringing to seven the station's total of aircraft squadrons.

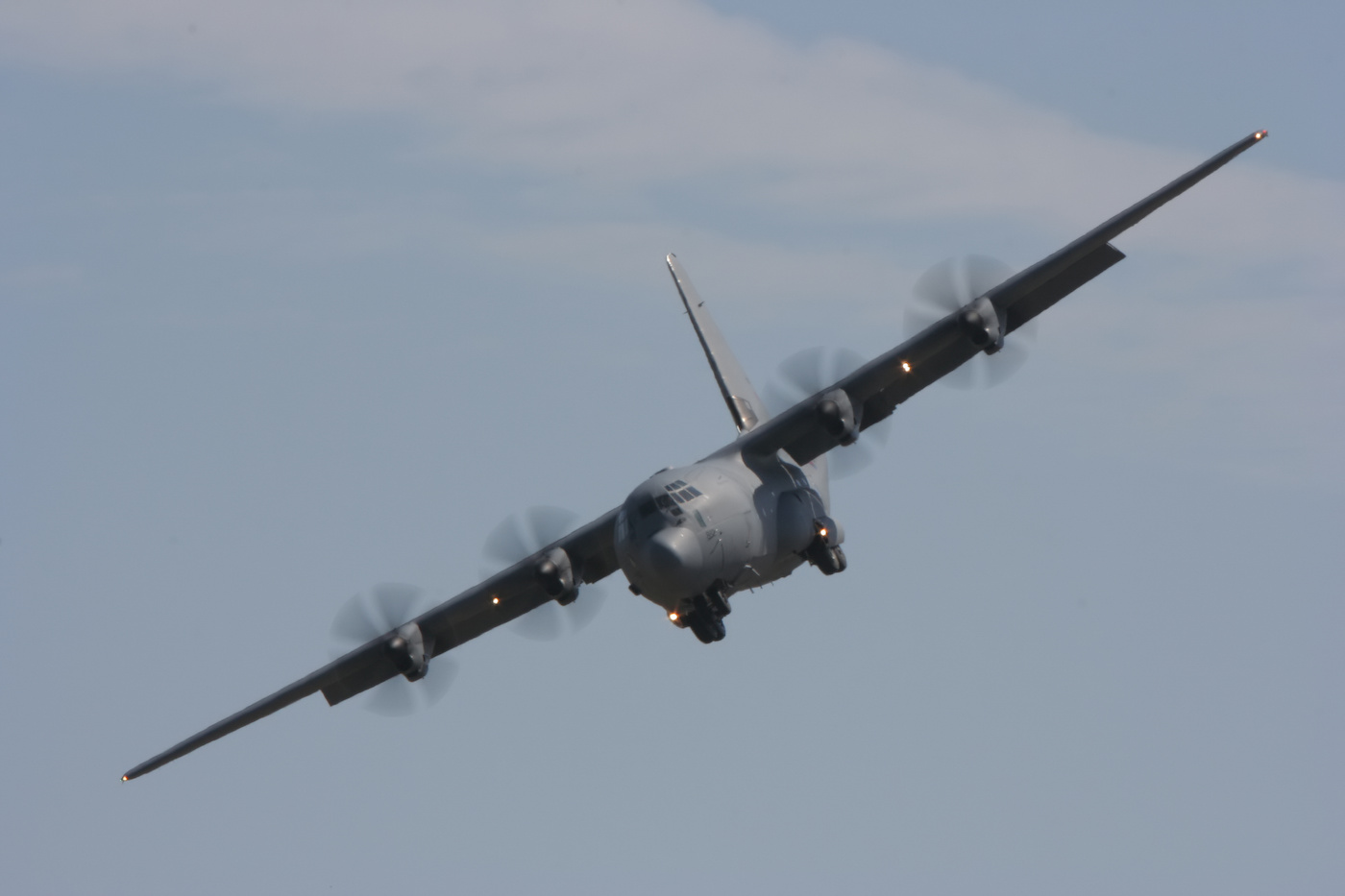
RAF Hercules in flight

=== Closure of RAF station ===
The decision to close RAF Lyneham was made in 2009, with all functions and aircraft relocated to RAF Brize Norton. With the transfer of military units and personnel to Brize Norton complete, around 1,000 members of military and civilian staff remained on site, gradually reducing in numbers until RAF Lyneham closed entirely, on 31 December 2012. Military flying operations from RAF Lyneham ceased on 30 September 2011, at which point the station's air traffic control unit closed.

A stone memorial commemorating the RAF's use of the station for over 70 years was unveiled on 1 June 2012. All remaining RAF Lyneham personnel left the station by December 2012.

=== Transfer to defence training role ===
==== 2011 plans ====
As part of the Defence Technical Training Change Programme, part of the wider Defence Training Review, the MOD announced on 18 July 2011 that the Defence College of Technical Training (DCTT) would relocate to Lyneham. Plans called for the relocation of various British Army, Royal Navy and RAF training facilities to Lyneham, with the aim of modernising technical training and achieving efficiencies. Initially it was planned that the following training functions would relocate to Lyneham.

- Electronic and Mechanical Engineering – training for vehicle mechanics and marine engineers, recovery mechanics, armourers, metalsmiths, control equipment technicians and technical support specialists. As a result of the move to Lyneham, the army's Royal Electrical and Mechanical Engineers (REME) technical training establishments at Arborfield Garrison in Berkshire and Bordon Camp in Hampshire, would both close. No. 4 School of Technical Training based at RAF St. Athan in Vale of Glamorgan and the Defence School of Marine Engineering at HMS Sultan in Gosport, Hampshire, would also relocate.
- Aeronautical Engineering – training for avionics and aircraft technicians. Delivery of training would relocate from Arborfield Garrison, No. 1 School of Technical Training and the Aeronautical Engineering & Management Training School at RAF Cosford in Shropshire and the Royal Naval Air Engineering & Survival Equipment School at HMS Sultan.
- Communications and Information Systems – field based tactical training and classroom/workshop based technical training, relocating from the Royal School of Signals at Blandford Camp in Dorset and No. 1 Radio School at RAF Cosford.

A planning application for the redevelopment of MOD Lyneham was submitted by the Defence Infrastructure Organisation to Wiltshire Council in May 2013 Planning permission was granted in October 2013 for the re-development of the station including the demolition of several existing structures and the construction of new and refurbished buildings to accommodate single living accommodation, dining, mess and welfare facilities, workshops, teaching accommodation and classrooms, offices, stores, medical and dental centre, church, museum, physical and recreational training centre, the creation of outdoor training areas including ground works and ground level alterations, the erection of masts, towers and radars, a forward operating base training facility, obstacle course, assault course, firing range, sports pitches, new roads, footpaths, parking, hard and soft landscaping, lighting, balancing ponds, and access alterations including a new roundabout and ancillary works.

The demolition of some unsafe and redundant buildings commenced in early 2013. The re-development was planned to be undertaken in a series of phases, construction beginning in 2014 and completing in December 2015, with the first units arriving and the start of training taking place in 2016. Further units would arrive in subsequent years with the programme being complete in 2019. The contract for the first phase was valued at between £180m and £230m.

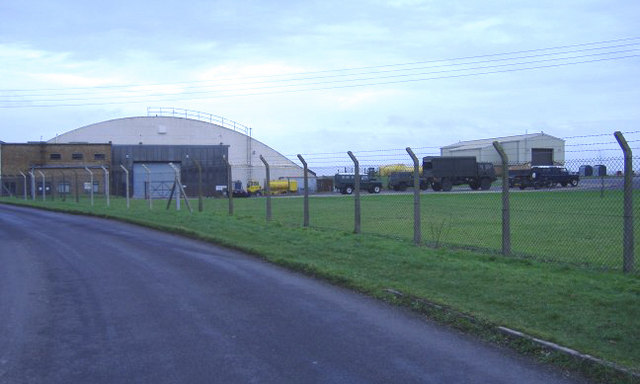
Hangar at MOD Lyneham

In December 2013, a £121m contract for the first phase of work was awarded to Hercules, a 50:50 joint-venture between Kier Group and Balfour Beatty. Construction work commenced in February 2014. Babcock's Defence and Security Division were awarded a contract in August 2014 to supply and support REME training at Lyneham, with a full operating capability programmed for February 2016.

==== 2015 re-evaluation ====
Michael Fallon, Secretary of State for Defence, announced in September 2015 that the relocation of the RAF and Royal Navy training elements to Lyneham would no longer take place. A re-evaluation of the programme determined that the consolidation onto a single site was no longer the best option. The first phase, the relocation of the REME schools from Arborfield and Bordon would still proceed.

REME training at Arborfield and Bordon transferred to Lyneham in September 2015, and was due to begin at Lyneham by November of that year. The School of Army Aeronautical Engineering (SAAE), which moved from Arborfield, started training in October 2015.

The new regimental headquarters of the REME was officially opened on 11 March 2016 by Prince Philip, Duke of Edinburgh and given the name The Prince Philip Barracks.

== Role and operations ==
=== Defence School of Electronic and Mechanical Engineering ===
Lyneham is home to the Defence School of Electronic and Mechanical Engineering (DSEME), part of the Defence College of Technical Training (DCTT) within No. 22 Group RAF. The school trains current and future Royal Electrical and Mechanical Engineers (REME) technicians.

=== Royal Electrical and Mechanical Engineers ===
The REME Museum, previously based in Arborfield, Berkshire, moved into the former Officers' Mess in 2015. The move provided an opportunity to refresh the displays and layout as well as provide new facilities such as a café, archives and a reading/conference room. There are dedicated education facilities to cater for groups of all ages and interests. The new museum opened to the public in June 2017.

The Royal Electrical and Mechanical Engineers also have their corps headquarters on the camp.

== Based units ==
The following notable units are based at MOD Lyneham.

=== Royal Air Force ===
- Headquarters Defence College of Technical Training (DCTT) – under No. 22 Group

=== British Army ===
- Defence School of Electronic and Mechanical Engineering (DSEME)
  - 8 Training Battalion, Royal Electrical and Mechanical Engineers
  - REME Arms School
  - School of Army Aeronautical Engineering (SAAE)

Royal Electrical and Mechanical Engineers (REME)

- Regimental Headquarters Royal Electrical and Mechanical Engineers
- 5 Force Support Battalion
- REME Museum

=== Civilian ===
- Babcock Defence Support Group

== See also ==
- Units of the Royal Electrical and Mechanical Engineers
