= Units of the Royal Electrical and Mechanical Engineers =

This is a list of units of the British Army's Royal Electrical and Mechanical Engineers.

== Division ==
- 1
- 2
- 3
- 4

== Battalion ==
- 1
- 1 Close Support
- 2
- 2 Close Support
- 3
- 3 Close Support
- 4 Close Support
- 5 Force Support
- 6 Close Support
- 7 Air Assault
- 8 Training

== Workshop ==
- 1 (Corps) Field
- 4
- 5
- 6
- 7
- 11
- 12
- 15
- 20
- 20 Corps Electrical
- 23 Base
- 37 (Rhine)
- 70 Aircraft
- 71 Aircraft
