= Royal Electrical and Mechanical Engineers =

Maintenance arm of the British Army

Corps of Royal Electrical and Mechanical Engineers
- Queen Elizabeth II Cap badge of REME
- Active: 1 October 1942 – present
- Country: United Kingdom
- Branch: British Army
- Size: 8,032 personnel
- Garrison/HQ: MoD Lyneham
- Mottos: Arte et Marte (Latin for "By Skill and By Fighting")
- Colours: Blue Yellow Red
- March: "Lillibullero"

Commanders
- Colonel-in-Chief: Sophie, Duchess of Edinburgh
- Master General: Lieutenant General Simon Hamilton

Insignia
- Tactical Recognition Flash

The Corps of Royal Electrical and Mechanical Engineers (REME /ˈriːmiː/ REE-mee) is the arm of the British Army that maintains the equipment that the Army uses. The corps is described as the "British Army's professional engineers".

== History ==
Prior to REME's formation, maintenance was the responsibility of several different corps:

- Royal Army Ordnance Corps—weapons and armoured vehicles
- Royal Engineers—engineering plant and machinery, and RE motor transport
- Royal Corps of Signals—communications equipment
- Royal Army Service Corps—other motor transport
- Royal Artillery—heavy weapons artificers

During World War II, the increase in quantity and complexity of equipment exposed the flaws in this system. Pursuant to the recommendation of a Committee on Skilled Men in the Services chaired by William Beveridge, the Corps of Royal Electrical and Mechanical Engineers was formed on 1 October 1942.

=== Phase I ===
Such a major re-organisation was too complex to be carried out quickly and completely in the middle of a world war. Therefore, the changeover was undertaken in two phases. In Phase I, which was implemented immediately, REME was formed on the existing framework of the RAOC Engineering Branch, strengthened by the transfer of certain technical units and tradesmen from the RE and RASC.

At the same time, a number of individual tradesmen were transferred into REME from other corps. The new corps was made responsible for repairing the technical equipment of all arms with certain major exceptions.

REME did not yet undertake:

- Those repairs that were carried out by unit tradesmen who were driver/mechanics or fitters in regiments and belonged to the unit rather than being attached to it.
- Repairs of RASC-operated vehicles, which remained the responsibility of the RASC; each RASC Transport Company had its own workshop.
- Repairs of RE specialist equipment, which remained the responsibility of the RE.

=== Phase II ===
In 1949, it was decided that "REME Phase II" should be implemented. This decision was published in Army Council Instruction 110 of 1949, and the necessary reorganisation was carried out in the various arms and services in three stages between July 1951 and January 1952. The main changes were:

- The transfer to REME of most of the unit repair responsibilities of other arms (Infantry, Royal Artillery, Royal Armoured Corps etc.).
- The provision of Light Aid Detachments for certain units that had not possessed them under the old organisation.
- The provision of new REME Workshops to carry out field repairs in RASC transport companies. Maintenance of vessels of the RASC fleet whilst in port was given to the fleet repair branch, a civilian organisation which came under the REME umbrella.

This organisation was also responsible for arranging and overseeing ship refits.

=== Cap badges ===
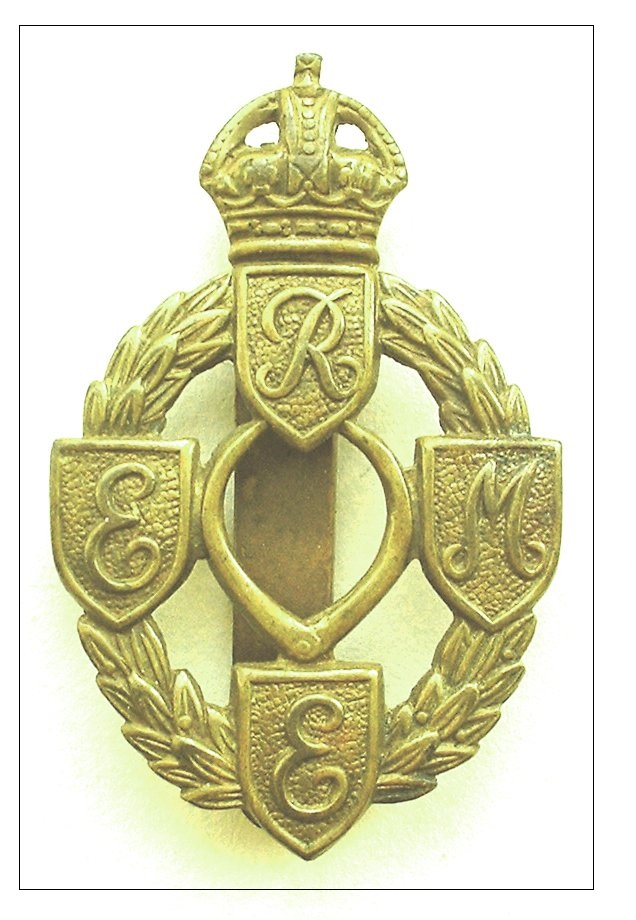
REME cap badge, first version, 1942–1947

After some interim designs, the badge of the Corps was formalised in June 1943 for use as the cap-badge, collar-badge, and on the buttons. It consisted of an oval Royally Crowned laurel wreath; on the wreath were four small shields at the compass points, each shield bearing one of the letters of "REME". Within the wreath was a pair of calipers. Examples of these early badges can be found at the REME Museum. In 1947, the Horse and Lightning was adopted as the cap badge, designed by Stephen Gooden.

=== Major Ivan Hirst REME and Volkswagen ===
At the end of the war, the Allies occupied the major German industrial centres to decide their fate. The Volkswagen factory at Wolfsburg became part of the British Zone in June 1945 and No. 30 Workshop Control Unit, REME, assumed control in July. They operated under the overall direction of Colonel Michael McEvoy at Rhine Army Headquarters, Bad Oeynhausen. Uniquely, he had experience of the KdF Wagen in his pre-war career as a motor racing engineer; whilst attending the Berlin Motor Show in 1939, he was able to test drive one.

After visiting the Volkswagen factory, McEvoy had the idea of trying to get Volkswagen back into production to provide light transport for the occupying forces. The British Army, Red Cross and essential German services were chronically short of light vehicles. If the factory could provide them, there would be no cost to the British taxpayer and the factory could be saved. To do this, a good manager with technical experience would be needed. Maj. Ivan Hirst was told simply to "take charge of" the Volkswagen plant before arriving in August 1945. He had drains fixed and bomb craters filled in; land in front of the factory was given over to food production.

At first, the wartime Kubelwagen was viewed as a suitable vehicle. Once it became clear it could not be put back into production, the Volkswagen saloon or Kaefer (Beetle) was suggested. Hirst had an example delivered to Rhine Army headquarters, where it was demonstrated by Colonel McEvoy. The positive reaction led to the Military Government placing an order for 20,000 Volkswagens in September 1945.

== Museum ==
The REME Museum is based at MoD Lyneham in Wiltshire.

== Training ==
The Defence School of Electronic and Mechanical Engineering at MoD Lyneham meets most of the training needs of the Corps and other parts of Defence including Royal Marines Vehicle Mechanics, Technicians, Metalsmiths and Armourers.

== Units ==
The Corps is structured as follows:

- Regular Army Battalions
  - 1 Close Support Battalion REME
  - 2 Close Support Battalion REME
  - 3 Armoured Close Support Battalion REME
  - 4 Armoured Close Support Battalion REME
  - 5 Force Support Battalion REME
  - 6 Armoured Close Support Battalion REME
  - 7 Aviation Support Battalion REME
  - 8 Training Battalion REME
  - 9 Theatre Support Battalion REME
- Army Reserve Battalions
  - 101 Battalion REME
  - 102 Battalion REME
  - 103 Battalion REME

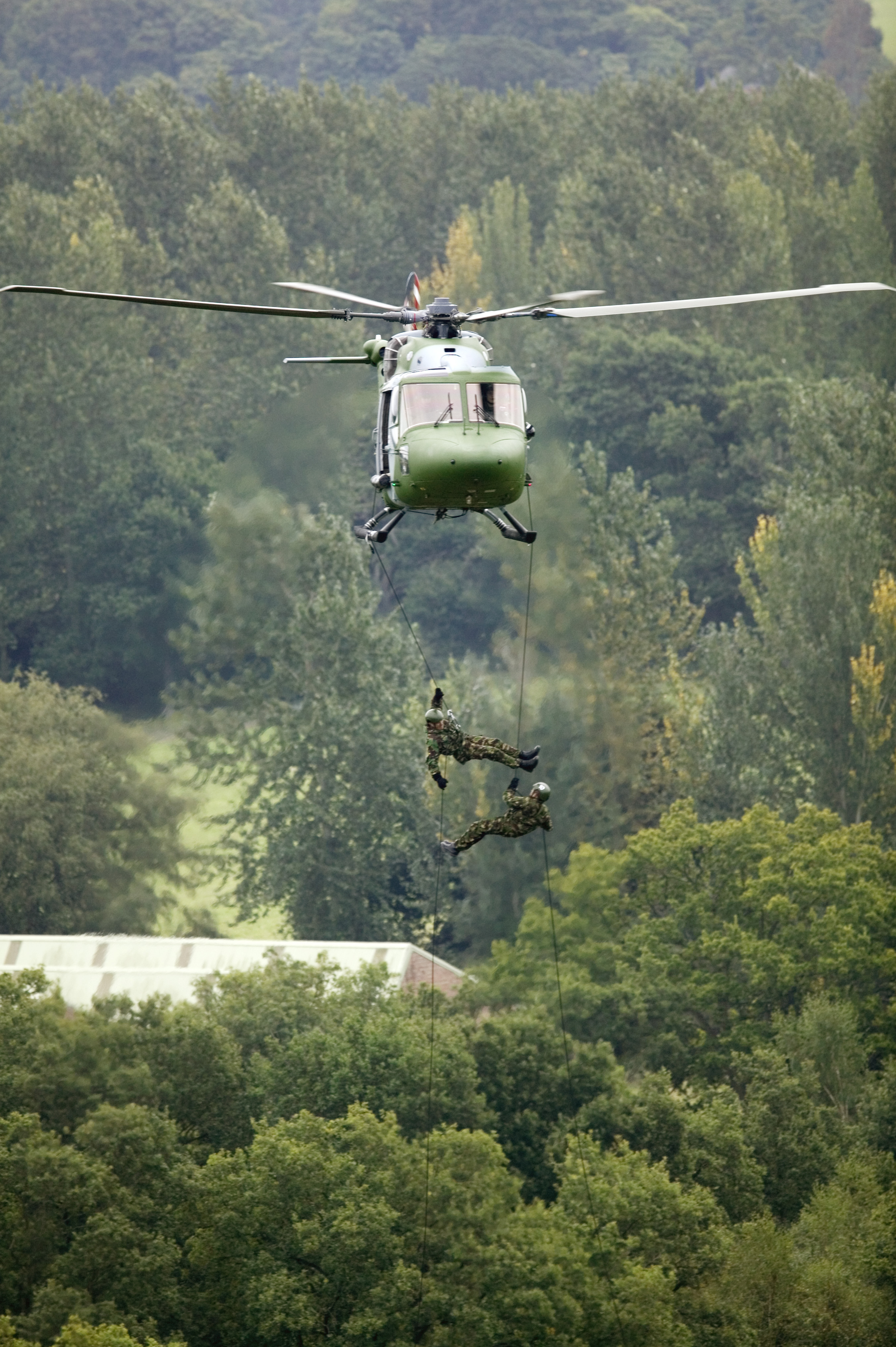
Two soldiers from the Royal Electrical and Mechanical Engineers (REME) abseil from an Army Air Corps Lynx helicopter

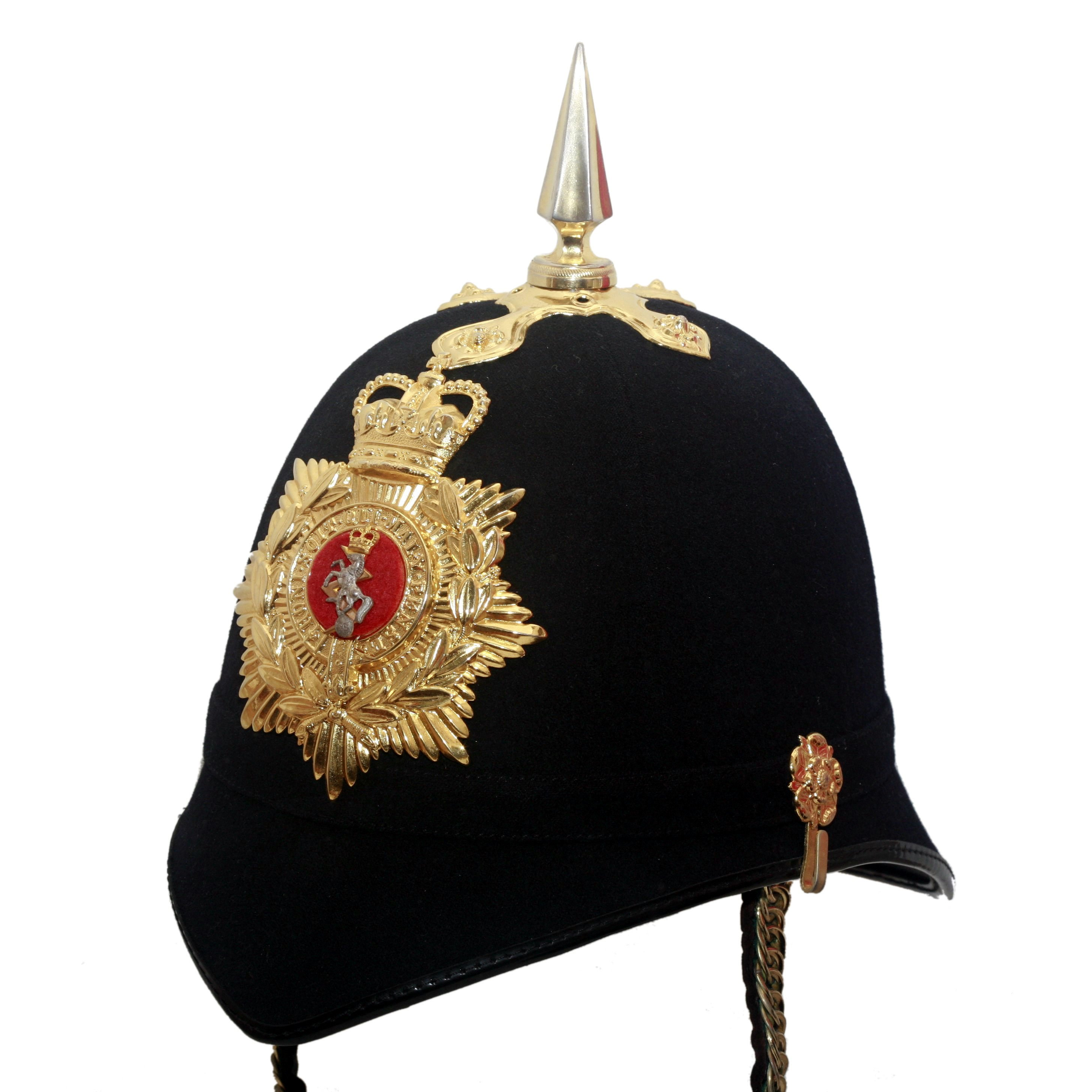
REME full dress home service helmet with Brunswick star cap badge

Separate Units

- Regimental Headquarters, at Prince Philip Barracks, MoD Lyneham
- 8 Field Company (Para), 16 Air Assault Brigade Combat Team, Merville Barracks
- Falkland Islands Motor Transport Workshop
- 24 Commando REME Workshop, Chivenor
- 3rd Regiment Royal Horse Artillery Workshop
- BATUS Workshop
- BATUK Workshop, HQ in Nanyuki (small rear workshop in Nairobi)
- Brunei Garrison Workshop
- Cyprus Force Workshop Company, HQ at RAF Akrotiri (part of the Cyprus Service Support Unit)
- Land Warfare Centre battlegroup light aid detachment, at Harman Lines, Warminster Garrison
- Lightning Bolts Army Parachute Display Team, the parachute display team of REME, one of the four official Army parachute display teams.

== List of Directors of Electrical and Mechanical Engineering / Master General REME ==
The head of REME was officially known as Director of Electrical and Mechanical Engineering (Army) or DEME(A).

- Major-General Eric Rowcroft (1942 to 1946)
- Major-General Wilfred (Bill) S Tope (1947 to 1949)
- Major-General Stanley William Joslin (1950 to 1953)
- Major-General Wilfred Austin Lord (1954 to 1957)
- Major-General Sir Leslie Norman Tyler (1957 to 1960)
- Major General Denis Redman (1960 to 1963)
- Major General Sir Leonard Henry Atkinson (1963 to 1966)
- Major-General A McGill (1966 to 1968)
- Major-General Peter Howard Girling (1969 to 1972)
- Major-General A M McKay (1972 to 1975)
- Major-General Hugh Macdonald-Smith (1975 to 1978)
- Major-General J V Homan (1978 to 1979)
- Major-General Pat Lee (1979 to 1981)
- Major-General T B Palmer (1983 to 1985)
- Major-General J Boyne (1985 to 1988)
- Major-General D Shaw (1988 to 1991)
- Major-General M S Heath (1991 to 1993)
- Major-General P J G Corp (1993 to 1997)
- Major-General Peter V R Besgrove (1997 to 1999)
- Brigadier Roderick J Croucher (1999 to 2002)
- Brigadier Stephen Tetlow (2002 to 2005)
- Brigadier N T S Williams (2005 to 2007)
- Brigadier B W McCall (2007 to 2010)
- Brigadier M J Boswell (2010 to 2012)

In 2012, a new post of Master General REME was created with Lieutenant General Andrew Figgures as the first incumbent.

- Lieutenant General Andrew Figgures (2012 to 2017)
- Lieutenant General Paul Jaques (2017 to 2023)
- Lieutenant General David James Eastman (2023 to 2026)
- Lieutenant General Simon Hamilton (1 April 2026 – present)

=== List of Colonel Commandants ===
- Lieutenant-General Sir Patrick Sanders (until 1 November 2018)
- Major-General G. I. Mitchell, CB (until 2023)
- Major-General David James Eastman (until 2023)
- Lieutenant-General Dame Sharon Nesmith, 1 November 2018–1 November 2023
- Major-General William O'Leary (until 1 June 2024)
- Colonel I. J. Phillips (until August 2024)
- Lt-Gen. Simon Hamilton (until May 2025)
- Major-General Darren Howard Crook, 31 March 2023–present
- Major-General Anna-Lee Reilly, 1 April 2023–present
- Major-General Neil B. Thorpe, 1 April 2023–present
- Major-General Paul Raymond Griffiths, 1 November 2023–present
- Brigadier Ingrid Anne Rolland, 1 June 2024–present
- Colonel I. S. Wallace, 31 August 2024–present
- Major-General Philip David Prosser, 1 June 2025

== Freedoms ==
The Royal Electrical and Mechanical Engineers has received the freedom of several UK local government areas.

Local government areas awarding freedom to the Royal Electrical and Mechanical Engineers or its units
Date	Area	Notes	Refs
21 October 1978	Borough of Wokingham	Berkshire England	
October 1987	Great Aycliffe	Durham England 124 Recovery Company (V)	
12 September 1992	Prestatyn	Denbighshire Wales. 119 (Holywell) Recovery Company (V)	.
2012	Richmond	North Yorkshire England. 1 Close Support Battalion	
5 April 2013	Wrexham	Wales. 101 Force Support Battalion	
27 June 2015	Bordon	East Hampshire England.	
6 July 2017	Royal Wootton Bassett	Wiltshire England. 8 Training Battalion	
23 June 2024	Lenham	Maidstone Kent England.	
25 July 2026	Whitby	North Yorkshire England.	

== See also ==
- Units of the Royal Electrical and Mechanical Engineers

Preceded by Royal Army Medical Service	Order of Precedence	Succeeded by Adjutant General's Corps
