= Dickie Davis (British Army officer) =

Major General Dickie Davis CB CBE
- Born: 2 August 1962 (age 64); Hampshire, England
- Military career
- Allegiance: United Kingdom
- Branch: British Army
- Service years: 1983–2015
- Rank: Major General
- Nickname: "Dickie"
- Service number: 514841
- Unit: Royal Engineers
- Commands: Army Recruiting and Training; 22 Engineer Regiment
- Conflicts: War in Afghanistan
- Awards: Companion of the Order of the Bath; Commander of the Order of the British Empire; Queen's Commendation for Valuable Service; Bronze Star Medal (United States); De Fleury Medal (United States)

Major General Richard Roderick Davis, CB, CBE (born 2 August 1962) is a retired British Army officer and author who has worked extensively in sub-Saharan Africa. He is currently the Managing Director of Nant Enterprises and a Special Advisor to the Johannesburg-based Brenthurst Foundation.

== Military career ==
Davis studied for a degree in civil engineering at the Royal Military College of Science before attending the Royal Military Academy Sandhurst and being commissioned into the Royal Engineers in 1984.

He served as commanding officer of 22 Engineer Regiment in which role he was deployed to Kosovo and subsequently to West Yorkshire to provide firefighting cover as part of Operation Fresco. In June 2003 he set up and led the first UK Provincial Reconstruction Team in Mazar-e-Sharif, Northern Afghanistan. The team established a ceasefire between the rival warlords Atta Muhammad Nur and General Abdul Rashid Dostum and started a disarmament process. Davis subsequently returned to Afghanistan as the ISAF Chief Engineer between 2006 and 2007, and again as Chief of Staff, Regional Command South (Kandahar) between 2009 and 2010. He was awarded the Queen's Commendation for Valuable Service in 2011.

Davis commanded the Army Recruiting and Training Division from 2011 until 2013. His final military appointment was Director General Personnel from which he retired in 2015.

Davis is a Colonel Commandant of the Royal Engineers and Honorary Colonel of the Royal Monmouthshire Royal Engineers (Militia).

== Works ==
Davis has taken to writing in his retirement. His works include:

- Mills, Greg; Herbst, Jeffrey; Obasanjo, Olusegun; Davis, Dickie (2017). Making Africa Work: A Handbook. C Hurst. ISBN 978-1849048736.
- Mills, Greg; Kilcullen, David; Davis, Dickie; Spencer, David (2016). A Great Perhaps? Colombia: Conflict and Convergence. C. Hurst. ISBN 978-1849046282.
- Kerr, Alexandra; Miklaucic, Michael (2017). Effective, Legitimate, Secure: Insights for Defense Institution Building. Journal for Complex Operations. (contributor)

Military offices
Preceded by Gerald Berragan	Director-General, Army Recruiting and Training; 2010–2013	Succeeded by Christopher Tickell
Preceded by Richard Nugee	Director-General, Army Personnel; 2013–2015	Succeeded by James Bashall
