= Sharon Nesmith =

British Army officer (born 1970)

General Dame Sharon Nesmith DCB ADC Gen
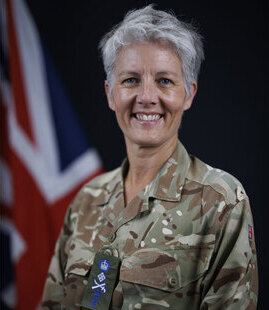
- Nesmith in 2024
- Born: Sharon Patricia Moffat; June 1970 (age 56); Northumberland, England
- Military career
- Allegiance: United Kingdom
- Branch: British Army
- Service years: 1988–present
- Rank: General
- Commands: Army Recruiting and Initial Training Command; 1st Signal Brigade; 22nd Signal Regiment
- Conflicts: United Nations Protection Force; Iraq War
- Awards: Dame Commander of the Order of the Bath

General Dame Sharon Patricia Moffat Nesmith, DCB, ADC Gen (née Moffat; born June 1970) is a senior British Army officer. She has been Vice-Chief of the Defence Staff since June 2024, having served as Deputy Chief of the General Staff from August 2022 to May 2024. She became the first woman to command a British Army brigade in 2014, the first woman to command a British division-level formation in 2021, the first woman to be promoted to lieutenant general in the British Army in 2022 and the first to be promoted to general in 2024.

== Early life and education ==
Nesmith was born in June 1970, and is from Northumberland. Her father was an officer in the Royal Naval Reserve, and her brother served in the British Army for 16 years. She studied biological sciences at the University of Edinburgh. She was sponsored through university by the British Army, having been awarded a university cadetship.

== Military career ==
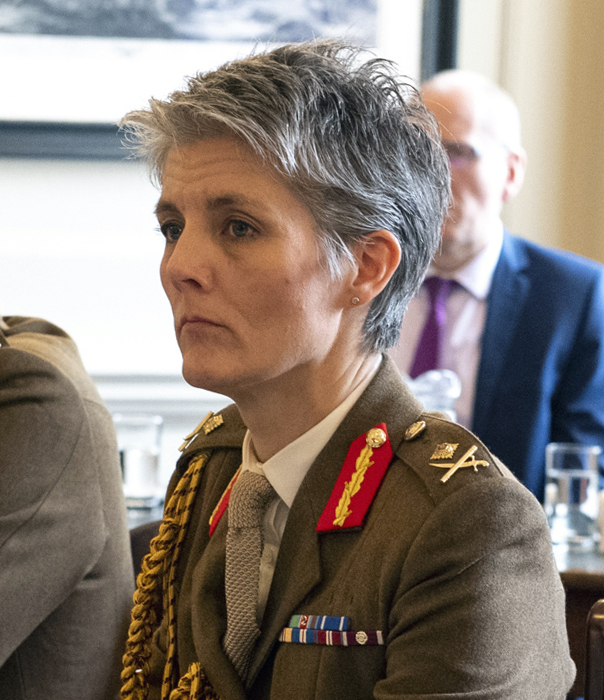
Major General Sharon Nesmith attending the Army Board in 2019

Nesmith was commissioned in the Women's Royal Army Corps of the British Army as a second lieutenant (on probation) on 4 September 1988 as part of her university cadetship. Following university and Sandhurst, she was commissioned a second lieutenant in the Royal Corps of Signals on 11 July 1991, with seniority in that rank from 5 August 1989. She was promoted to lieutenant on 5 August 1991. She served in the Balkans, Iraq and Latvia. She was promoted to captain on 1 April 1995, to major on 30 September 2000. As officer commanding 215 Signal Squadron, she deployed on Op TELIC 10 in 2007. She was promoted to lieutenant colonel on 30 June 2008, and was commanding officer of 22nd Signal Regiment from 2009 to 2011. She was promoted to colonel on 30 June 2012.

In August 2014, Nesmith became the first woman to command a British Army brigade when she was chosen to command the 1st Signal Brigade. She was promoted to brigadier on 30 June 2015. Her role was formally announced by Secretary of State for Defence Michael Fallon in September 2015, almost a year after she started in the role. The brigade consisted of between 1,500 and 5,000 troops. This was the highest role ever taken by a woman in the British Army.

Nesmith was a Colonel Commandant of the Corps of Royal Electrical and Mechanical Engineers from 1 November 2018 to 1 November 2023.

=== General officer ===
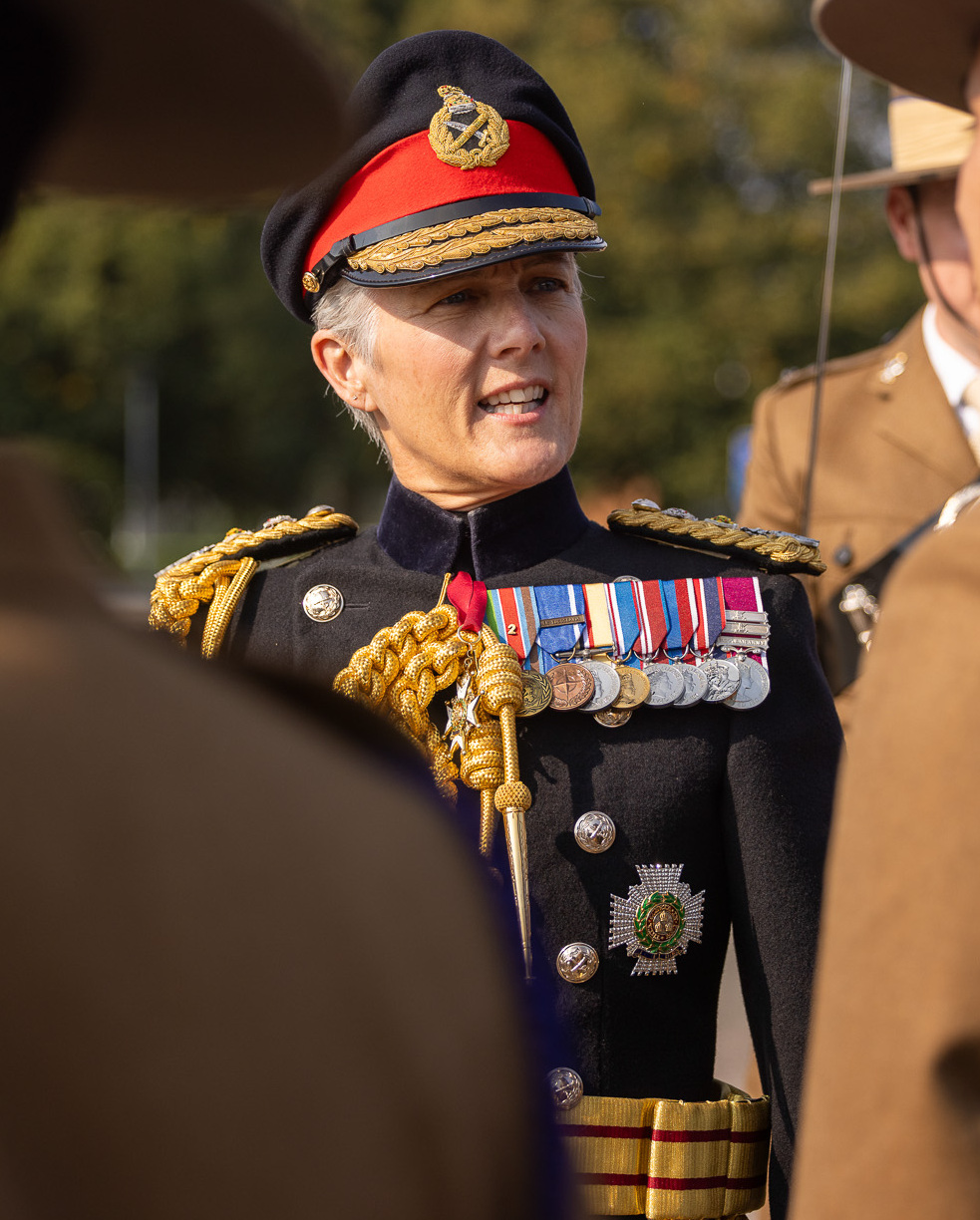
Nesmith inspecting troops in 2024

On 8 March 2019, The Times reported that Nesmith was to be appointed as Director (Personnel) at Army Headquarters and would sit on the Army Board. She assumed the appointment on 14 March 2019 and was promoted to major general. On 15 March 2019, she was appointed to the honorary position of Assistant Colonel Commandant of the Adjutant General's Corps; she relinquished the appointment on 6 November 2019. On 1 August 2019, she was appointed Colonel Commandant of the Royal Corps of Signals, and on 1 October 2020 was appointed Master of Signals, succeeding Lieutenant General Sir Nick Pope. She stepped down from both positions as her tenure expired in June 2025. She became General Officer Commanding of Army Recruiting and Initial Training Command in January 2021.

Nesmith was promoted to lieutenant general and appointed Deputy Chief of the General Staff on 11 August 2022, becoming the first woman to hold lieutenant general rank in the British Army. She was appointed a Dame Commander of the Order of the Bath (DCB) in the 2024 New Year Honours, and thereby granted the title dame.

In May 2024, it was announced that Nesmith would be appointed the next Vice-Chief of Defence Staff in succession to Gwyn Jenkins, and would thus become the first woman to hold the rank of general in the British Army and therefore the highest-ranked female officer in British history. On 10 June 2024, she took up the appointment, was promoted to general, and was made an aide-de-camp general (ADC Gen) to King Charles III.

=== Wear of orders, decorations, and medals ===
Ribbons of Sharon Nesmith
2

	Dame Commander of the Order of the Bath		
United Nations Medal for the UNCRO mission with a two	NATO Medal for the former Yugoslavia	Iraq Medal	Queen Elizabeth II Golden Jubilee Medal
Queen Elizabeth II Diamond Jubilee Medal	Queen Elizabeth II Platinum Jubilee Medal	King Charles III Coronation Medal	Army Long Service and Good Conduct Medal with two bars

== Personal life ==
Between 1995 and 2000, Sharon Patricia Moffat married Walker Nesmith, a tree surgeon. She has two sons.

Nesmith has been a vice-president of the Army Football Association.

Military offices
Preceded by Chris Bell	GOC Army Recruiting and Initial Training Command; 2021–2022	Succeeded by Thomas Bewick
Preceded by Christopher Tickell	Deputy Chief of the General Staff; 2022–2024	Succeeded by David Eastman
Preceded by Gwyn Jenkins	Vice-Chief of the Defence Staff; 2024–present	Incumbent
