= Ewen Green =

Ewen Green may refer to

- E. H. H. Green, British historian
- Ewen Green (chess player), New Zealand chess master
