= Olivia Perks =

British Army officer cadet

- Born: December 17, 1997
- Died: February 6, 2019 (aged 21); Royal Military Academy Sandhurst
- Occupation: officer cadet

Olivia Perks was a 21-year-old officer cadet in the British Army who died by suicide at the Royal Military Academy Sandhurst (RMAS) in February 2019. Her death followed unaddressed mental health crises and rumours and investigations surrounding her relationships with training staff. Subsequent investigations into the circumstances of her death found that Perks suffered gross sexual misconduct from training staff at RMAS. They also found prohibited staff-cadet sexual relationships were frequent, welfare and safeguarding measures were inadequate, and that there had been multiple missed opportunities to prevent Perks' death.

== Life and death ==
Perks was born on 17 December 1997, grew up in Kingswinford, and wanted to become a British Army officer from a young age. She joined the Army Cadet Force as a teenager, where she was well-regarded. She was the youngest of the 180 cadets selected for officer training in her cohort. Those who knew her described her as being "bubbly" and showing "fearless determination".

Perks entered RMAS in May 2018. She initially performed well on the commissioning course and held in high regard but soon suffered mental health crises. Perks made a suicide attempt during a visit to the Royal Engineers in July 2018. It was assessed as having a low risk of reoccurrence, and she was given a "dressing down". She was assessed by mental health professionals and deemed to be well enough to resume training. However, she was not again referred for medical help after the two subsequent episodes.

Before her death, Perks engaged in a prohibited relationship with Staff sergeant Mark Easingwood, who worked as a fitness instructor for the cadets. Perks' friend said she feared she "may be pregnant" with his child. Following a formal ball, Perks stayed overnight in the room of Colour sergeant Lee Griffith, who was also responsible for training her. Although both individuals denied any sexual activity, rumours spread among fellow cadets via WhatsApp. A regimental sergeant major subjected her to persistent and aggressive questioning for forty-eight hours before her death, five days after the ball. As a result, Perks was isolated from her peers, experienced intense career anxiety, and felt as though she was "on trial".

Perks was found dead on the morning of 6 February 2019 after she failed to report to training. She was found hanged in her room, with the coroner recording her death as a suicide caused by asphyxia. Letters to her mother, friends, and the army were found in her room by investigators. In the letter to her mother, she said she "just can’t deal with the false rumours which have ruined my army career".

== Aftermath ==
The Ministry of Defence published a Service Inquiry in November 2022 into the circumstances of Perks' death. The report uncovered nineteen prohibited sexual relationships between staff and cadets in 2018 and concluded Perks suffered gross sexual misconduct from her superiors. It detailed severely under-resourced welfare departments and poor institutional communication. The panel issued sixty-one recommendations. For example, RMAS established a welfare team and introduced emotional intelligence screening for training staff. A subsequent inquest, which took place at Reading Town Hall and lasted 16 days, began in April 2023. The inquest found that the Army missed multiple clear opportunities to prevent Perks' death.

Following the public legal proceedings, Zac Stenning, the commandant of RMAS, apologised outside the courthouse, saying "we are deeply sorry for the systemic and individual failings" at RMAS led to Perks' death and that "much more should and could have been done to support her". Patrick Sanders, Chief of the General Staff, said "We all feel Olivia’s loss deeply" and that he was "utterly determined" to foster the "culture needed to ensure that the British Army remains a great institution". RMAS added new facilties and staff and improved its communications and processes. Perks' mother criticised RMAS, saying her daughter felt pressured to binge drink to conform with peers, she wasn't offered any support, and that the institution had a "boozy and toxic" culture.
