= Army Recruiting and Initial Training Command =

Specialist command of the British Army

- Active: 1 April 2018 – 2025
- Disbanded: 2025
- Country: United Kingdom
- Branch: British Army
- Type: Training command
- Role: Provide training
- Size: 2-star command
- Part of: Home Command
- Command HQ: Trenchard Lines, Upavon

The Army Recruiting and Initial Training Command (ARITC) was a two-star command of the British Army and was responsible for all recruiting, selection, and basic training of soldiers and the recruitment and selection of officers.

== History ==
Army 2020 was the name given to the restructuring of the British Army, in light of the 2010 Strategic Defence and Security Review.

On 1 April 2018, the Army Recruiting and Training Division was disbanded. Before this date, the division (a major-general's command) was tasked with everything from recruiting to initial training to second-level training. The division at this time also controlled the Land Warfare Centre. However, following the Army 2020 Refine, the division was disestablished with the recruiting and initial training given to the new 'Army Recruiting and Initial Training Command', while the second-level and further training given to the Land Warfare Centre. The latter of which is now under direct control of Commander Field Army. During its existence, the command was under the control of Home Command.

In 2025 it was disbanded and replaced with the Army Individual Training Command and the Directorate of Army Recruiting, under the command of Standing Joint Command, which replaced Home Command.

== Structure ==
Army Recruiting and Initial Training Command was established on 1 April 2018. The Commander of this formation was a 2-star Major General.

- Army Recruiting and Initial Training Command, at Trenchard Lines, Upavon
  - Director General, Army Recruiting and Initial Training Command, a Major General
    - Commandant, School of Infantry
    - Commandant, Initial Training Group
    - Commandant, Royal School of Military Engineering
    - Director Recruit Training (Operations)
    - Director Recruit Training (Support)
    - Director Training (Army)
  - Defence College of Logistics and Personnel Administration
  - Army Adventurous Training Group (Army)
  - Initial Training Group, at Trenchard Lines, Upavon – commanded by a brigadier
    - Army Foundation College, Harrogate
    - Army School of Physical Training
    - Army Recruiting and Initial Training Centre Staff Leadership School
    - Army Training Centre, Pirbright
    - Army Training Regiment, Winchester
    - Army Training Regiment, Grantham
    - Army Training Unit North, at Queen Elizabeth Barracks, Strensall
    - Army Training Unit Northern Ireland, at Abercorn Barracks, Ballykinler
    - Army Training Unit Scotland, at Redford Barracks, Edinburgh
    - Army Training Unit West, at Maindy Barracks, Cardiff
      - Detachment, at Wyvern Barracks, Exeter
  - Army Recruiting Group
    - Outreach Team South West, at Wyvern Barracks, Exeter
  - School of Infantry, at Vimy Barracks, Catterick Garrison
    - Infantry Training Centre, at Helles Barracks, Catterick Garrison
      - 1st Infantry Training Battalion
      - 2nd Infantry Training Battalion
      - Infantry Training Centre Support Battalion
        - Army School of Ceremonial
        - Army School of Bagpipe Music and Highland Drumming, at Redford Barracks, Edinburgh
        - 400 Troop, Royal Logistic Corps
      - Parachute Training Support Unit (PTSU), at RAF Brize Norton
      - Pegasus Company
    - Infantry Battle School, at Dering Lines, Brecon
      - Gurkha Company (Mandalay)
    - Specialist Weapons School, at Waterloo Lines, Warminster Garrison
  - Royal School of Military Engineering, at Brompton Barracks, Chatham Station
    - 1st Royal School of Military Engineering Regiment, Royal Engineers
    - 3rd Royal School of Military Engineering Regiment, Royal Engineers, at Gibraltar Barracks, Minley
    - Professional Engineer Wing
    - Royal Engineer Warfare Wing, at Gibraltar Barracks, Minley
    - Defence Animal Training Regiment, Royal Army Veterinary Corps, at the Defence Animal Training Centre, Melton Mowbray
    - Defence Explosive Ordnance Disposal, Munitions and Search Training Regiment, at MoD Bicester, Bicester
    - Royal Military School of Music, at Kneller Hall, Twickenham
    - Defence Chemical, Biological, Radiological and Nuclear Centre, in Winterbourne Gunner

== Commanders ==
Commanders have been:
Army Recruiting and Initial Training Command

- Major-General Paul Nanson (2018–2020)
- Major-General Chris Bell (2020–2021)
- Major-General Sharon Nesmith (2021–2022)
- Major-General Thomas Bewick (2022–2024)
- Major-General Nick Cowley (2024–2025)
