= Paul Nanson =

British Army general (born 1965)

Major General Paul Nanson CB CBE
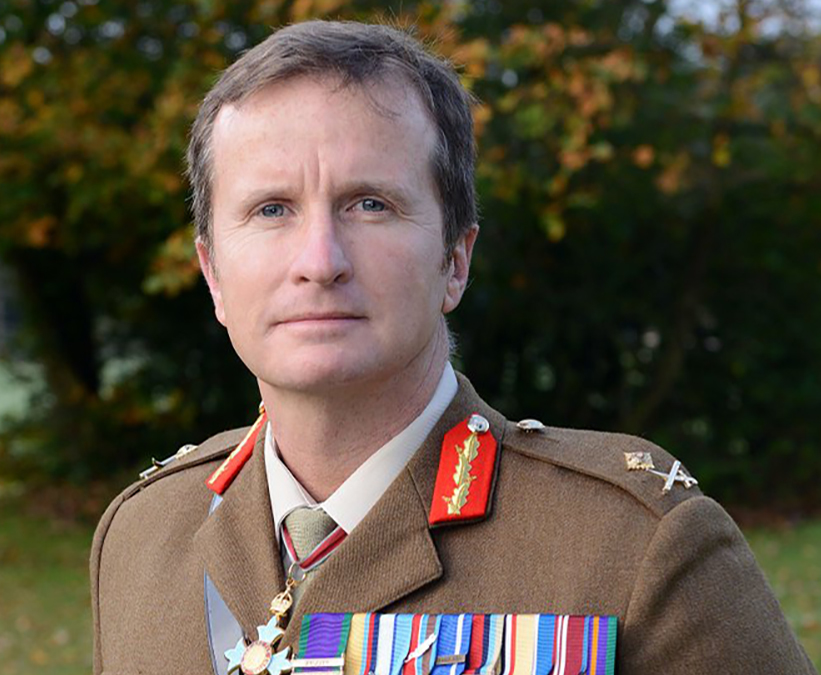
- Born: 10 May 1965 (age 61); Ormskirk, Lancashire, England
- Military career
- Allegiance: United Kingdom
- Branch: British Army
- Service years: 1986–2020
- Rank: Major General
- Service number: 522686
- Unit: Royal Regiment of Fusiliers
- Commands: Royal Military Academy Sandhurst (2015–2020); 7th Armoured Brigade (2011–2013); 1st Battalion, Royal Regiment of Fusiliers (2006–2008)
- Conflicts: The Troubles; Gulf War; Bosnian War; Iraq War; War in Afghanistan
- Awards: Companion of the Order of the Bath; Commander of the Order of the British Empire

Major General Paul Anthony Edward Nanson, CB, CBE (born 10 May 1965) is a retired British Army officer who served as Commander 7th Armoured Brigade, Commandant of the Royal Military Academy Sandhurst and General Officer Commanding Recruiting and Initial Training Command.

== Early life and education ==
Nanson was born in Ormskirk, Lancashire, England. He was educated at Merchant Taylors' Boys' School, Crosby and the Royal Military Academy Sandhurst.

== Military career ==
Nanson was commissioned into the Royal Regiment of Fusiliers in January 1986. He became commanding officer of the 1st Battalion Royal Regiment of Fusiliers in 2006 and was deployed to Iraq. He went on to be chief of staff for 1st (United Kingdom) Armoured Division in Germany in 2008, commander of the 7th Armoured Brigade in March 2011 and Director (Army) at the Joint Services Command and Staff College in April 2014. He was appointed a Commander of the Order of the British Empire on 26 February 2015 for distinguished services in Afghanistan.

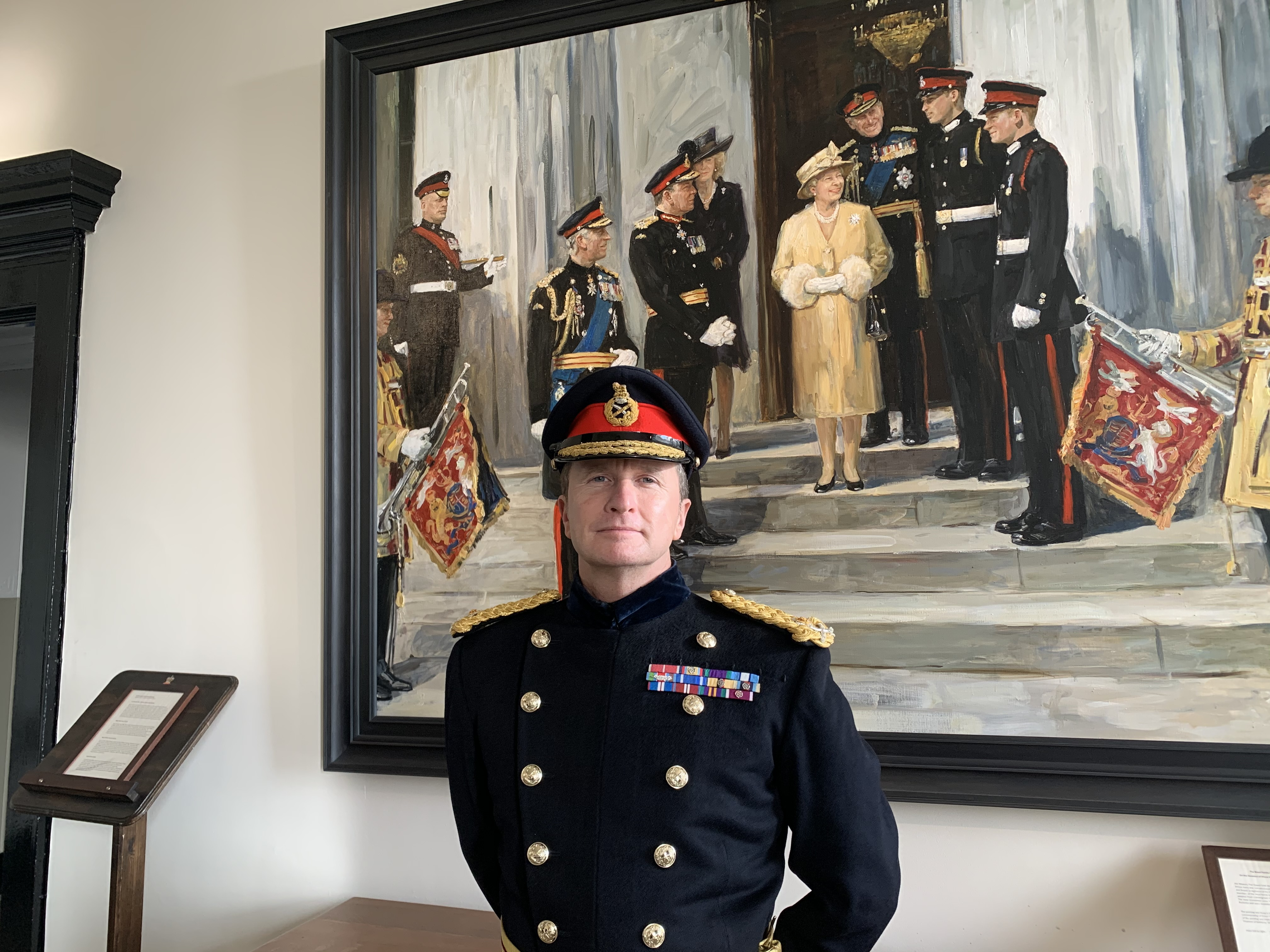
Nanson at Sandhurst in 2019

Nanson became Commandant of the Royal Military Academy Sandhurst in September 2015. He was given the additional appointment of General Officer Commanding Army Recruiting and Initial Training Command in 2018, a post in which he continued after finishing his 5-year term at the Royal Military academy, Sandhurst as commandant. Nanson was appointed a Companion of the Order of the Bath in the 2020 New Year Honours, and retired from the British Army on 4 November that year.

Military offices
Preceded by Stuart Skeates	Commandant of the Royal Military Academy Sandhurst; 2015–2020	Succeeded by Duncan Capps
New title	GOC Army Recruiting and Initial Training Command; 2018–2020	Succeeded by Chris Bell
Preceded by David J. Paterson	Colonel of the Royal Regiment of Fusiliers; 2015–present	Incumbent
