= Directorate of Army Recruiting =

- Active: 2025–present
- Country: United Kingdom
- Branch: British Army
- Role: Recruiting
- Part of: Standing Joint Command

Commanders
- Current commander: Major-General Joseph Fossey

The Directorate of Army Recruiting (DAR) is a two star command of the British Army and is responsible for the recruitment and selection of Soldiers and Officers into both the regular army and Army Reserve. It works in partnership with the private recruitment company Capita.

It is also responsible for transitioning to the new tri service Armed Forces Recruiting Service (AFRS) on behalf of the Army, which will take over recruitment operations for all branches in 2027.

== History ==
Army 2020 was the name given to the restructuring of the British Army, in light of the 2010 Strategic Defence and Security Review.

On 1 April 2018, the Army Recruiting and Training Division was disbanded. Before this date, the division (a major-general's command) was tasked with everything from recruiting to initial training to second-level training. The division at this time also controlled the Land Warfare Centre. However, following the Army 2020 Refine, the division was disestablished with the recruiting and initial training given to the new 'Army Recruiting and Initial Training Command'.

In 2025 the Army Recruiting and Initial Training Command was disbanded with the training functions being transferred to the newly created Army Individual Training Command, and recruiting and training functions transferred to the new Directorate of Army Recruiting.

== Structure ==
Units under the command of the DAR are,

- Directorate of Army Recruiting
  - Recruiting Group
  - Personnel Campaign Office
  - Army Officer Selection Board

== Commanders ==
Director Army Recruiting

- Major-General Joseph Fossey (2025–present)
