= Ian Cave =

British Army general

Lieutenant General Sir Ian Cave KCB
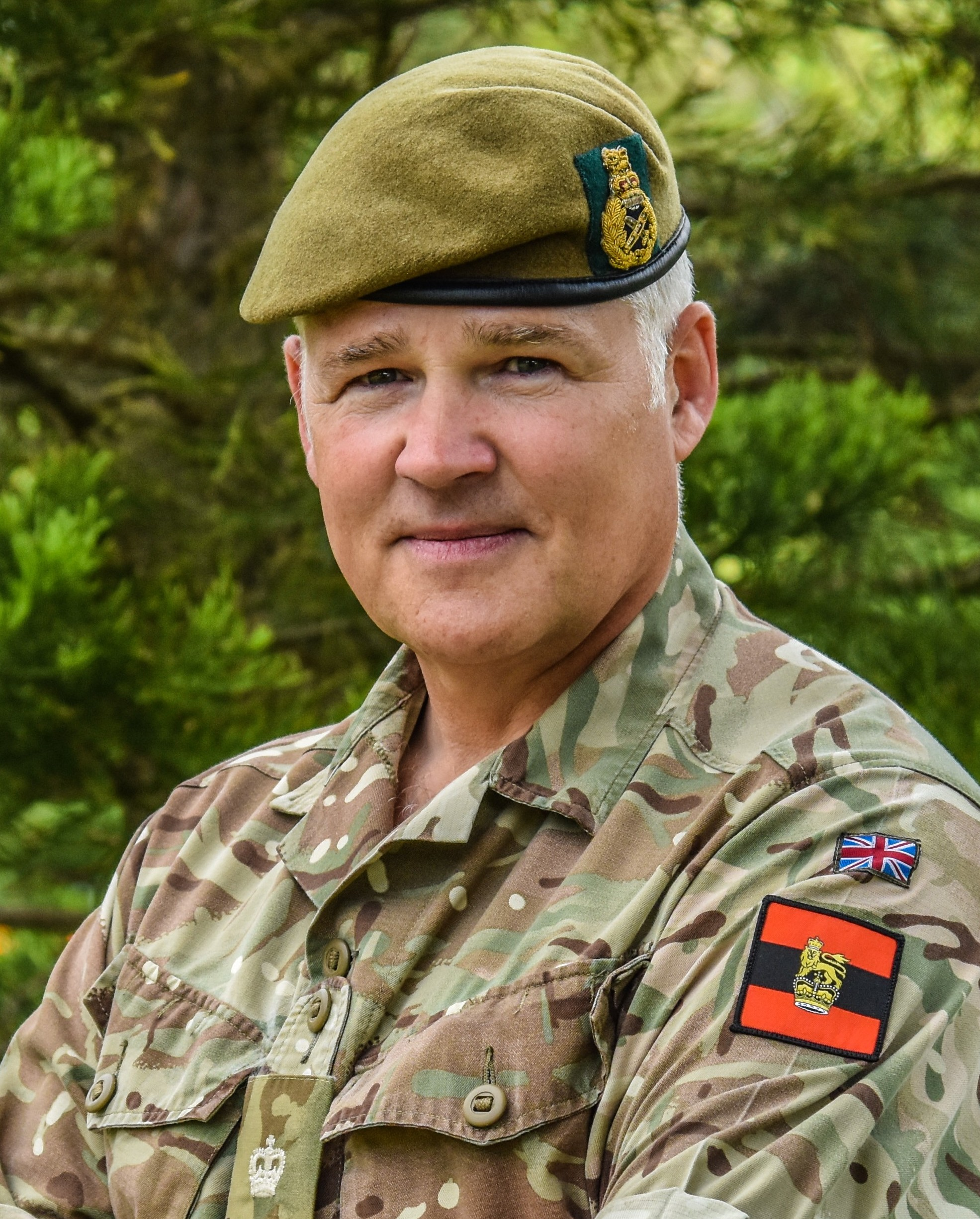
- Born: 1966 (age 59–60)
- Military career
- Allegiance: United Kingdom
- Branch: British Army
- Service years: 1987–2026
- Rank: Lieutenant General
- Commands: UK Military Representative to NATO; Home Command; Initial Training Group; 1st Battalion, Mercian Regiment
- Conflicts: Iraq War; War in Afghanistan
- Awards: Knight Commander of the Order of the Bath; Queen's Commendation for Valuable Service

Lieutenant General Sir Ian John Cave, KCB (born 1966) is a former senior British Army officer who was Commander Home Command from June 2021 to September 2023 and UK Military Representative to NATO and to the European Union from November 2023 to January 2026.

== Military career ==
Cave was commissioned into the Queen's Lancashire Regiment on 4 September 1987. He was subsequently transferred to the Royal Welch Fusiliers on 9 February 1988.

Cave served as commanding officer of the 1st Battalion, the Mercian Regiment and in that capacity saw action in the Iraq War in 2008, for which he was awarded a Queen's Commendation for Valuable Service. He went on to be Commander, Initial Training Group in February 2011, Director of Training, Field Army in February 2014 and Deputy Chief of Staff (Plans), Joint Force Command Naples in July 2015. After that he became Chief of Staff, Field Army in April 2018, Commander Home Command in June 2021 and UK Military Representative to NATO and to the European Union from November 2023 to January 2026. He retired from the British Army on 19 May 2026.

Cave has also been Colonel of the Mercian Regiment since 2018, and was Colonel Commandant of the King's Division, Infantry from December 2021 until December 2022. He was Deputy Colonel Commandant of the Adjutant General's Corps until October 2024.

== Honours ==
He was appointed a Companion of the Order of the Bath (CB) in the 2020 New Year Honours. In the 2024 King's Birthday Honours, he was promoted to Knight Commander of the Order of the Bath (KCB).

Military offices
Preceded by Sir Tyrone Urch	Commander Home Command; 2021–2023	Succeeded by Charles Seymour Collins
Preceded by Sir Ben Bathurst	UK Military Representative to NATO; 2023–2026	Succeeded by Eldon Millar
