= Charles Collins (British Army officer) =

British Army officer

Lieutenant General Sir Charles Collins KBE DSO
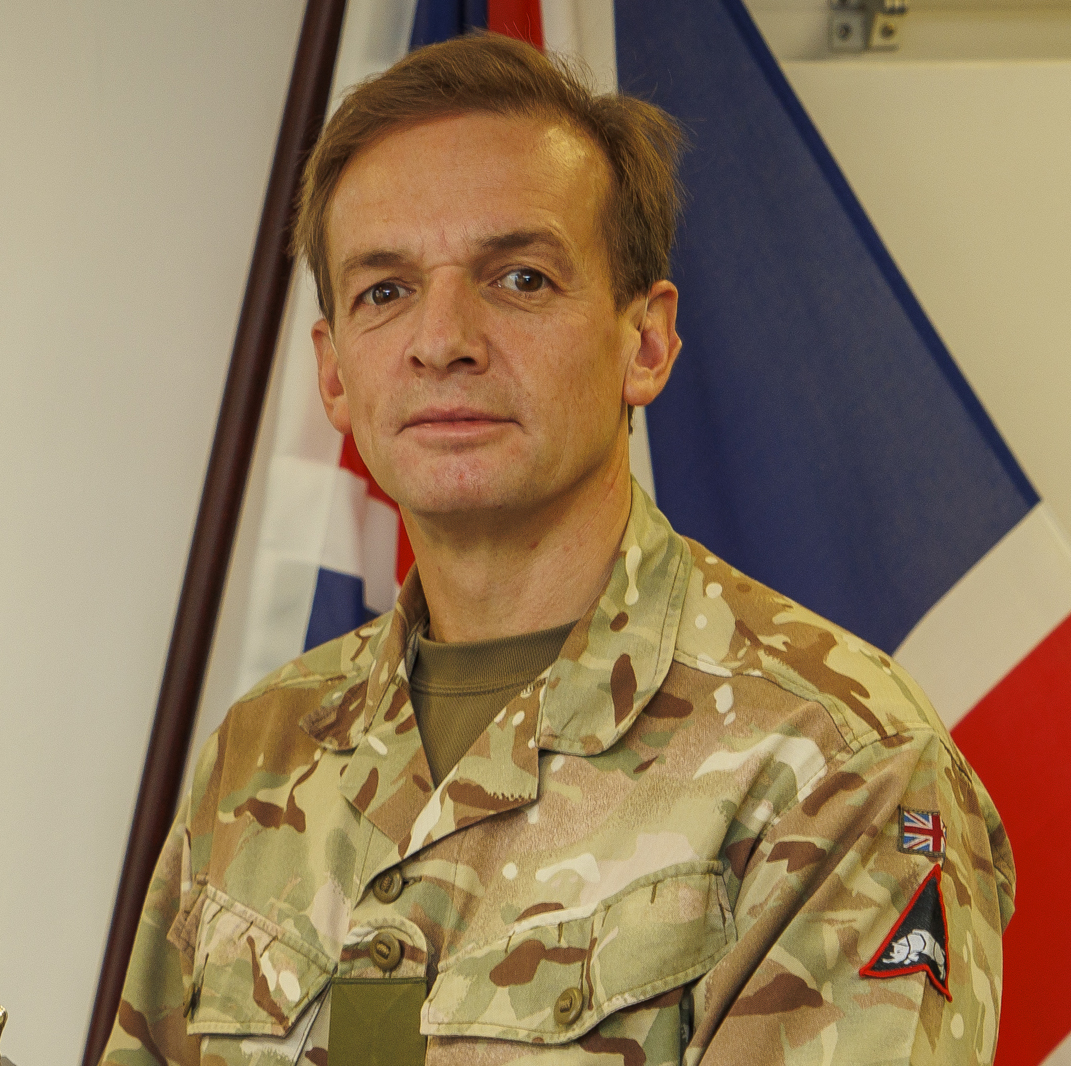
- Collins in 2022
- Military career
- Allegiance: United Kingdom
- Branch: British Army
- Service years: 1995–present
- Rank: Lieutenant General
- Commands: Home Command; Assistant Chief of the General Staff; 1st (United Kingdom) Division; 7th Infantry Brigade; 5th Battalion, The Rifles
- Conflicts: War in Afghanistan
- Awards: Knight Commander of the Order of the British Empire; Distinguished Service Order

Lieutenant General Sir Charles Seymour Collins, KBE, DSO is a senior British Army officer, who currently serves as Deputy Chief of the Defence Staff (Military Strategy and Operations).

== Military career ==
Collins was commissioned into the Royal Green Jackets in 1995. He was appointed commanding officer of the 5th Battalion of The Rifles in 2012 and was deployed in that role to Afghanistan. He went on to be commander of 7th Infantry Brigade in 2016 and was then Assistant Chief of Staff (Plans) at Permanent Joint Headquarters in 2018 before becoming General Officer Commanding 1st (United Kingdom) Division in September 2020. He became Assistant Chief of the General Staff in 2022, and was appointed Commander Home Command with the promotion to lieutenant general on 4 September 2023.

Collins became Deputy Chief of the Defence Staff (Military Strategy and Operations) in September 2025.

Collins was appointed a Member of the Order of the British Empire in the 2010 Birthday Honours, and was awarded the Distinguished Service Order for his service in Afghanistan on 25 March 2011. He was advanced to Officer of the Order of the British Empire on 3 July 2015 and to Knight Commander of the Order of the British Empire in the 2025 Birthday Honours.

== Honorary appointments ==
Collins was appointed Honorary Colonel of the Cambridge University Officers′ Training Corps on 1 June 2024, and a Colonel Commandant of the Adjutant General's Corps on 28 November 2024.

He was Assistant Colonel Commandant of The Rifles from around 2024 to 2026, and was appointed Colonel Commandant of the regiment from 1 May 2026.

Military offices
Preceded by Colin Weir	General Officer Commanding 1st (United Kingdom) Division; 2020–2022	Succeeded by Jean Laurentin acting
Preceded by Nick Perry	Assistant Chief of the General Staff; 2022–2023	Succeeded by Paul Griffiths
Preceded by Ian Cave	Commander Home Command; 2023–2025	Succeeded by Paul Griffiths (as Commander Standing Joint Command)
Preceded by Harv Smyth	Deputy Chief of the Defence Staff (Military Strategy and Operations); 2025–present	Incumbent
