= Churston Ferrers Grammar School =

Academy in Torbay, Devon, England

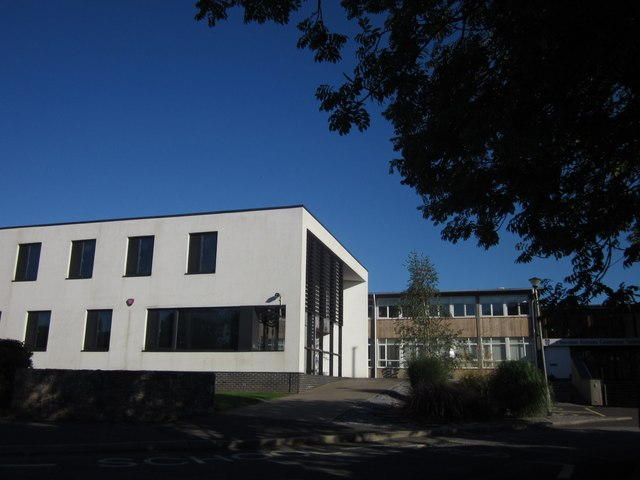

Location
- Greenway Road; Brixham, Devon, TQ5 0LN; England; 50.395948°N 3.557532°W

Information
- Type: Academy; Selective grammar school
- Motto: Learning to create a better world
- Established: 1957
- Specialist: Humanities
- Department for Education URN: 136388 Tables
- Ofsted: Reports
- Gender: Co-educational
- Age: 11 to 18
- Enrolment: 1016
- Website: www.churstongrammar.com

Churston Ferrers Grammar School (also known as CFGS) is a selective coeducational Grammar School with Academy status, situated in the village of Galmpton in Torbay, South Devon, England. It is also a specialist Humanities College. Year 7 annual intake is approximately 160 pupils.

== History ==
The school was founded in 1957 and accommodated around 350 pupils, drawn from the surrounding areas including those of the schools it replaced and as far afield as Totnes. Its first headmaster, Donald W. Carter, was head of the Dartmouth Grammar School until its closing in 1957 when Churston opened. He led the school until 1972 when he retired.

In 2011, the school became an academy.

== Location ==
The school is next to Churston railway station on the Paignton and Dartmouth Steam Railway. Its main playing fields are separated from the remainder of the school by the railway line and are currently accessible via a path under the railway line at the bottom of the main school playing field, or via Dartmouth road and the pavilions which were opened at the start of 2009.

== Buildings ==
The school has occupied its current buildings since opening and was largely unchanged for the first half of its existence. When the school expanded in the late 1980s, a new classroom block and sports facility was added. Later, in 2001, the school expanded further with a Modern Foreign Languages block. In late September 2008, the school had a new block consisting of: a humanities classroom; a study centre; an IT room and two new departmental offices. This building was named 'The Cube' by the students in a poll from a selection of alternative names. For some time, there was a "maths hut", which was a temporary building that housed two Mathematics classrooms. This was eventually demolished in 2011 to make way for the new Sixth Form Centre which was completed in the summer of 2012. Also in 2016 a remodelling and extension of the Modern Foreign Languages block created a new section of the school for Art and Music.

== Academic houses ==
There are currently five academic houses: Brunel, Christie, Gilbert, Singer and Thompson. All of the houses are named after notable individuals with ties to the local area, South Devon. Each house is represented by an individual crest and colour (Brunel - blue, Christie - green, Gilbert - red, Singer - purple, Thompson - yellow) and a head is appointed to ensure the running of the house system.

Each pupil is assigned to a house-based form upon induction and throughout the duration of the pupil's time at CFGS, will compete in both academic and sporting inter-house competitions as determined by an annual calendar of events; house points are subsequently awarded to each form group, contributing towards the yearly House Badge Competition.

== Headteachers ==
Appointment	Name
1957	Donald W. Carter
1972	Ron Beal
1975	David Beresford-Williams
1979	John Parsons
1997	Steven Kings
2007	Robert Owers
2019	Kieran Earley
2023	James Simpson

== Academic ==
There are currently 1016 pupils enrolled.

Churston Ferrers Grammar School is currently ranked "Good" by Ofsted. The most recent Ofsted inspection was on 19 October 2022. Prior to 2022, Churston Ferrers Grammar School had been ranked Ofsted "Outstanding" on 11 February 2009.

Churston A-Level results:

A2	2003	2004	2005	2006
A-E	99.4%	100%	100%	99.74%
A-C	80%	81%	88.6%	90.03%
A-B	49%	59%	65.6%	66.04%

2018 A2 Results:

A*-E	99.53%
A*-D	98.35%
A*-C	91.25%
A*-B	70.69%
A*-A	37.12%

Churston GCSE results:

GCSE	1993	1994	1995	1996
A*-C	94.1%	94.3%	97.8%	95.6%
5D*-E	9%	9%	9.1%	9.4%
D-E*	3.3%	4%	5%	5.8%

The school has no present plans to offer sixth formers the option of either the International Baccalaureate or the Pre-U. It does however currently offer the AQA/English Baccalaureate to sixth form students.

== Sports and extra-curricular ==
=== Basketball ===
Since the establishment of the CFGS team, the school has twice been crowned National Champions.

=== Duke of Edinburgh's Award ===
The Duke of Edinburgh's Award at CFGS has grown increasingly in popularity over the last ten years and CFGS is a Directly Licensed Centre for DofE. Students have the choice to take part in DofE between Years 9 and 13 and approximately 200 students are currently doing either bronze, silver or gold level.

=== Other ===
Churston Ferrers Grammar School has historically had a debating presence both on and off site, from the organisation of hustings events for general elections to active participation in South West Academic Trust (SWAT) competitions.

Students have in the recent past had available the option of attending a 'Listeners' programme that trained senior students in how to offer well-being support to younger students.

== Notable former pupils (Old Churstonians) ==
- Giselle Ansley, Olympic field hockey gold medal athlete
- Tom Bewick, British Army officer
- E. H. H. Green (1958–2006), historian who worked on the history of the 20th-century Conservative Party
- Adam Hart, scientist, broadcaster and author
