= Zac Stenning =

British Army officer

Lieutenant General Zac Stenning CB OBE
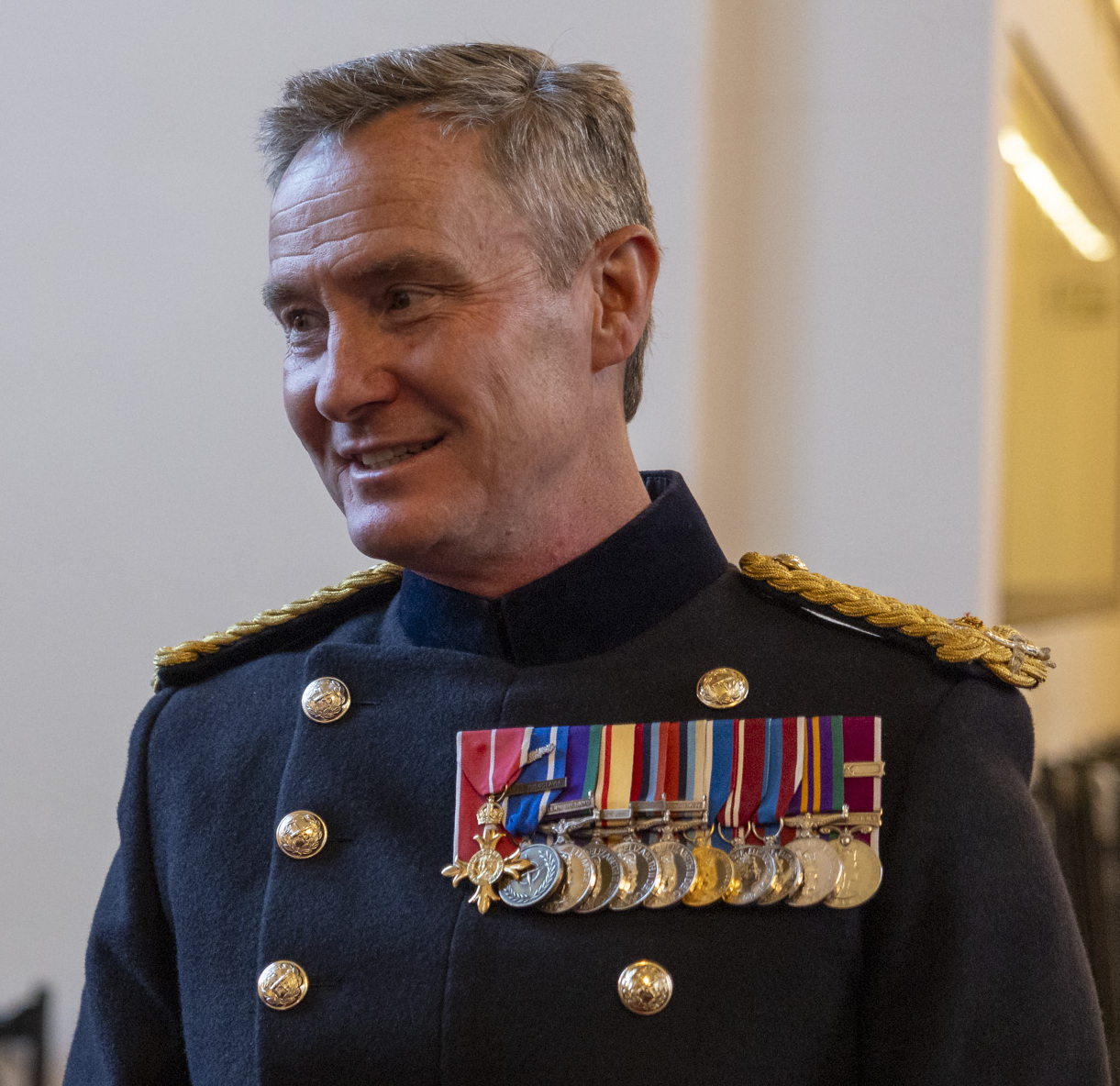
- Stenning in 2024
- Military career
- Allegiance: United Kingdom
- Branch: British Army
- Service years: 1995 – Present
- Rank: Lieutenant General
- Commands: 1st Armoured Infantry Brigade; Commandant of the Royal Military Academy Sandhurst
- Conflicts: Iraq War; War in Afghanistan
- Awards: Companion of the Order of the Bath; Officer of the Order of the British Empire

Lieutenant General Zachary Raymond Stenning, CB, OBE is a senior British Army officer who served as the Commandant of the Royal Military Academy Sandhurst from August 2022 to October 2024. From March 2026 he is Commander Land Forces.

== Early life and education ==
From 1985 to 1990, Stenning was educated at Brighton College, an independent school in Brighton. He undertook a Bachelor of Arts (BA) degree in War Studies at King's College London, graduating in 1994; he was a member of the first cohort for this degree.

== Military career ==
Stenning was commissioned into the Royal Engineers on 4 September 1995. He was transferred to the Green Howards on 1 August 1996. In December 1997, he was awarded the Queen's Commendation for Valuable Service "in recognition of gallant and distinguished services in the former Yugoslavia during the period 21st December 1996 to 20th June 1997". He was promoted to captain on 16 March 1998. In July 2008, he was appointed a Member of the Order of the British Empire (MBE) "in recognition of gallant and distinguished services in Iraq during the period 1st October 2007 to 31st March 2008". In 2012, he saw active service as commanding officer of 3rd Battalion, Yorkshire Regiment in Afghanistan during Operation Herrick. In March 2013, he was advanced to Officer of the Order of the British Empire (OBE) "in recognition of gallant and distinguished services in Afghanistan during the period 1 April 2012 to 30 September 2012".

Stenning became chief of staff of 3rd (United Kingdom) Division in October 2013, and was promoted to brigadier on 30 June 2014. He became commander of 1st Armoured Infantry Brigade in September 2016. In 2018, he was awarded the Medal for Long Service and Good Conduct (Military) with 1 Clasp. He was promoted to major general on 29 July 2022, and appointed Commandant of the Royal Military Academy Sandhurst on 12 August 2022. He was subsequently Director of Cyber and Specialist Operations Command (CSOC). In March 2026 it was announced that he would become Commander Land Forces, taking up the position with promotion to lieutenant-general on 30 April 2026.

On 6 June 2021, Stenning was appointed colonel of the Yorkshire Regiment, an honorary and ceremonial appointment, for a term of five years in succession to Brigadier Andrew Jackson. He was appointed colonel commandant of the Royal Army Veterinary Corps on 1 June 2022, in succession to Lieutenant General Roland Walker. He was made honorary colonel of the University of London Officers' Training Corps on 31 July 2022, in succession to Lieutenant General James Bashall.

Stenning was appointed a Companion of the Order of the Bath in the 2025 Birthday Honours.

Military offices
Preceded by Duncan Capps	Commandant of the Royal Military Academy Sandhurst; 2022–2024	Succeeded by Nick Cowley
Preceded by Mike Elviss	Commander Land Forces; 2026–Present	Incumbent
