= Tom Bewick =

British Army general

Major General Tom Bewick OBE
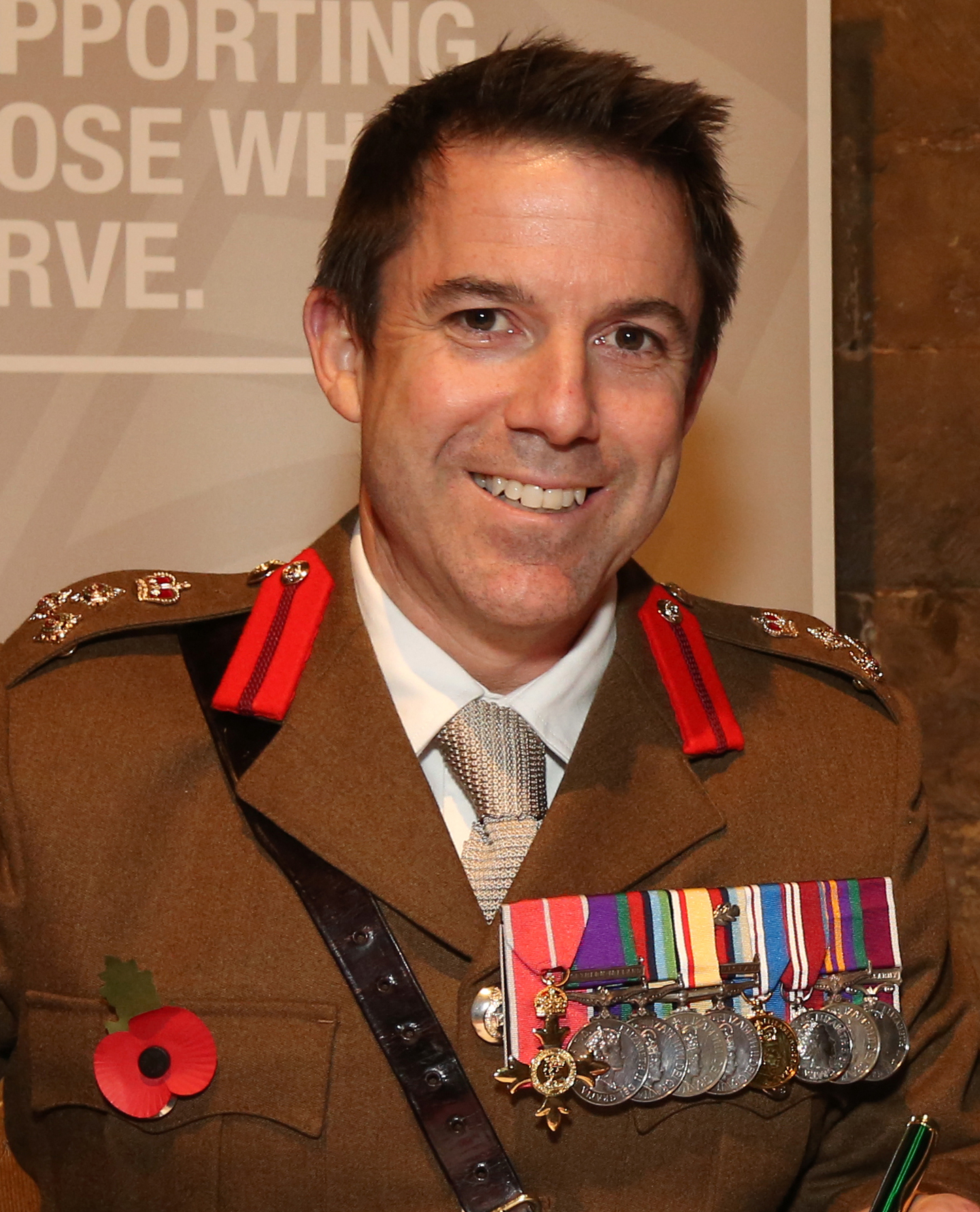
- Brigadier Bewick in 2018
- Military career
- Allegiance: United Kingdom
- Branch: British Army
- Service years: 1996–present
- Rank: Major General
- Commands: British Forces Cyprus; 7th Infantry Brigade; 4th Battalion The Rifles
- Conflicts: Iraq War; War in Afghanistan
- Awards: Officer of the Order of the British Empire

Major General Thomas Howard Bewick, OBE is a senior British Army officer. He has served as Commander of British Forces Cyprus since April 2025.

== Early life and education ==
Bewick grew up in Devon, England. He was educated at Churston Grammar School and University College London.

== Military career ==
Bewick was commissioned into The Light Infantry in 1996. After being deployed to Iraq on Operation Telic 3 as an operational planner, he became commanding officer 4th Battalion The Rifles and was deployed to Afghanistan on Operation Herrick 18. He went on to be commander of 7th Infantry Brigade in September 2018 and then became General Officer Commanding Army Recruiting and Initial Training Command in 2022. After that, he became General Officer Commanding British Forces Cyprus in April 2025.

He was awarded the Queen's Commendation for Valuable Service in recognition of gallant and distinguished services in Afghanistan on 11 September 2009. He was appointed a Member of the Order of the British Empire on 25 March 2011 and was advanced to Officer of the Order of the British Empire on 21 March 2014.

Military offices
Preceded by Sharon Nesmith	GOC Army Recruiting and Initial Training Command; 2022–2024	Succeeded by Nick Cowley
Preceded by P J M Squires	Commander British Forces Cyprus; 2025–present	Incumbent
