= Paul Griffiths (British Army officer) =

British Army officer

Lieutenant General Paul Griffiths CB
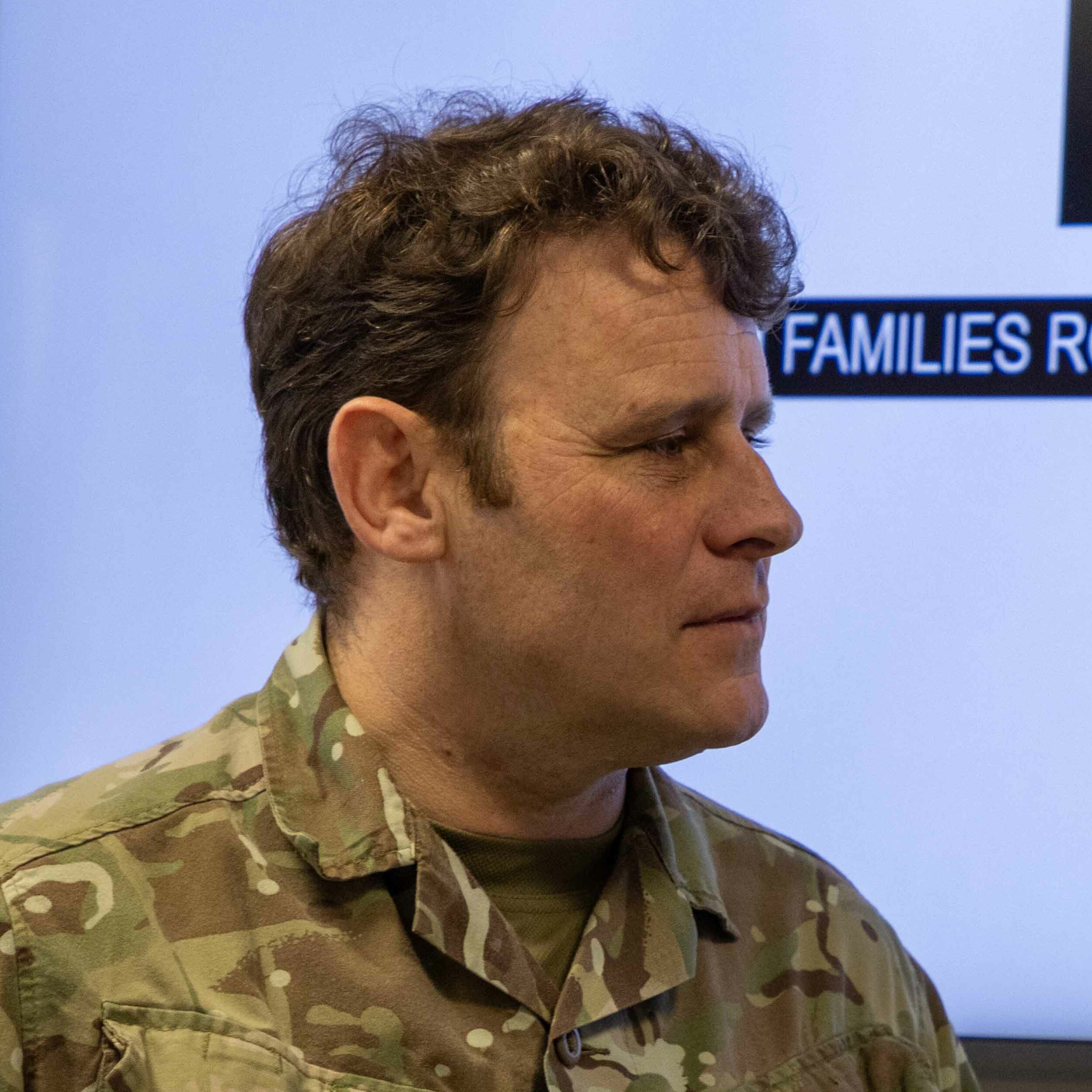
- Griffiths in 2021
- Military career
- Allegiance: United Kingdom
- Branch: British Army
- Service years: 1993–present
- Rank: Lieutenant General
- Commands: 3rd (UK) Division Signal Regiment; 1st Signal Brigade
- Conflicts: War in Afghanistan
- Awards: Companion of the Order of the Bath

Lieutenant General Paul Raymond Griffiths CB is a British Army officer who serves as Commander Standing Joint Command.

== Military career ==
Griffiths was commissioned into the Royal Corps of Signals in 1993. He became commanding officer of 3rd (UK) Division Signal Regiment in 2012 and was deployed to Afghanistan. He went on to be commander of 1st Signal Brigade in August 2016, Director of Personnel Policy at the Ministry of Defence in May 2019 and Director-General, Army Personnel in January 2021. After that, he was Assistant Chief of the General Staff from August 2023 until August 2025. He was promoted to lieutenant-general on 1 September 2025, as he was appointed Commander Standing Joint Command.

He was appointed a Colonel Commandant of the Royal Electrical and Mechanical Engineers on 1 November 2023, and Master of Signals in the Royal Corps of Signals on 21 June 2025.

He was appointed a Companion of the Order of the Bath in the 2023 Birthday Honours.

Military offices
Preceded by Charles Collins	Assistant Chief of the General Staff; 2023–2025	Succeeded by Jonathan Swift
Preceded by Sir Charles Collins	Commander Standing Joint Command; 2025–present	Incumbent
