= Tyrone Urch =

British Army officer (born 1965)

Lieutenant General Sir Tyrone Urch KBE
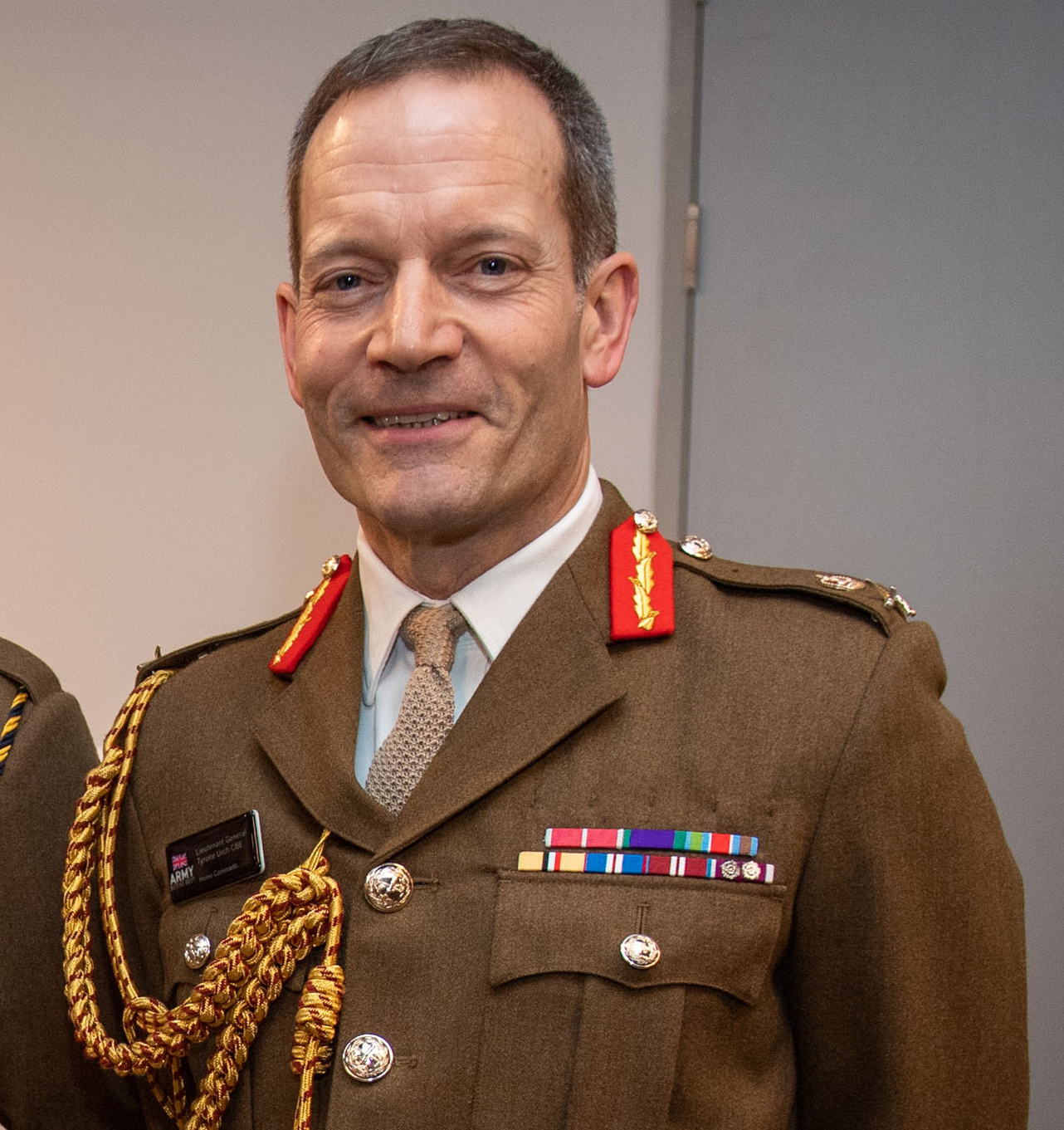
- Urch in 2020
- Born: 12 June 1965 (age 61)
- Military career
- Allegiance: United Kingdom
- Branch: British Army
- Service years: 1984–2021
- Rank: Lieutenant General
- Commands: Home Command; Force Troops Command; 1st Mechanised Brigade; 22 Engineer Regiment
- Conflicts: Iraq War
- Awards: Knight Commander of the Order of the British Empire

Lieutenant General Sir Tyrone Richard Urch, KBE (born 12 June 1965) is a former senior British Army officer who served as General Officer Commanding, Force Troops Command and later Commander, Home Command.

== Early life and education ==
Urch was born on 12 June 1965. He was educated at Lord Weymouth's School, Warminster, and Welbeck College. He studied at Cranfield University (BEng) and King's College London (MA).

== Military career ==
Urch was commissioned into the Royal Engineers on 4 June 1984. In 2001, as officer commanding 20 Field Squadron, he led the construction of two schools, a new hangar at Price Barracks and a jungle research station in Belize. He became Commanding Officer of 22 Engineer Regiment in 2004, and was deployed to Iraq later that year. He went on to be Commander of 1st Mechanised Brigade in December 2008, Assistant Chief of Staff, Operations at the Permanent Joint Headquarters in Northwood in December 2010, and Chief of Staff for Land Forces in October 2012. After that he became General Officer Commanding Force Troops Command in February 2015; he was promoted to lieutenant-general and became Commander Home Command in June 2018. He retired in June 2021.

He was a Colonel Commandant in the Royal Engineers until October 2023, and Chief Royal Engineer from 14 September 2018 until 1 January 2024.

Urch was appointed Commander of the Order of the British Empire (CBE) in the 2011 Birthday Honours, and Knight Commander of the Order of the British Empire (KBE) in the 2021 New Year Honours.

Military offices
Preceded by Tim Radford	General Officer Commanding, Force Troops Command; 2015–2017	Succeeded by Tom Copinger-Symes
Preceded by James Bashall	Commander Home Command; 2018–2021	Succeeded by Ian Cave
Honorary titles
Preceded by Sir Mark Mans	Chief Royal Engineer; 2018–2024	Succeeded by Sir Christopher Tickell
