= Christopher Tickell =

British Army general (born 1964)

Lieutenant General Sir Christopher Tickell KBE
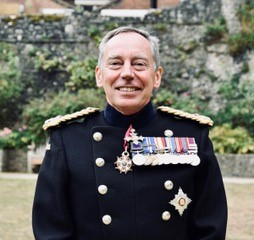
- Tickell in 2023
- Born: 17 March 1964 (age 62); Epsom, England
- Military career
- Allegiance: United Kingdom
- Branch: British Army
- Service years: 1983–2022
- Rank: Lieutenant General
- Service number: 517325
- Unit: Royal Engineers
- Commands: Army Recruiting and Training Division; 8 Force Engineer Brigade; 23 Engineer Regiment (Air Assault)
- Conflicts: The Troubles; Bosnian War; Kosovo War; Iraq War; War in Afghanistan
- Awards: Knight Commander of the Order of the British Empire

Lieutenant General Sir Christopher Linley Tickell, KBE (born 17 March 1964) is a senior British Army officer who served as the Deputy Chief of the General Staff from August 2019 to August 2022.

== Early life and education ==
Tickell was born on 17 March 1964 in Epsom, Surrey, England. He was educated at Wellington College, Berkshire, a private school, and at Cranfield University.

== Military career ==
Tickell was commissioned into the Royal Engineers in December 1983. After deployments as a squadron commander in Bosnia and Kosovo, he became commanding officer of 23 Engineer Regiment (Air Assault) in 2003 and in that role took part in the invasion of Iraq. He went on to be a staff officer in the Directorate of Training in May 2005 and commander of 8 Force Engineer Brigade in November 2007 and in that role was deployed to Afghanistan.

He became Director of the Army Division at the Joint Services Command and Staff College in December 2009, General Officer Commanding of the Army Recruiting and Training Division in August 2013, and Director Capability in November 2016. Tickell was promoted to lieutenant general on 12 August 2019 and assumed the duties of Deputy Chief of the General Staff that same date. He stepped down from this position in August 2022, and retired from the Army on 27 December 2022. He was appointed Chief Royal Engineer on 1 January 2024.

== Honours ==
Tickell was appointed a Member of the Order of the British Empire (MBE) in the 2001 New Year Honours, an Officer of the Order of the British Empire (OBE) on 31 October 2003, a Commander of the Order of the British Empire (CBE) in the 2011 New Year Honours and a Knight Commander of the Order of the British Empire (KBE) in the 2021 Birthday Honours.

He was Honorary Colonel of the Exeter University Officers Training Corps until 1 August 2021.

In the 2024 New Year Honours he was promoted to Commander of the Order of the British Empire (Military Division).

Military offices
Preceded by Dickie Davis	General Officer Commanding, Army Recruiting and Training Division; 2013–2016	Succeeded by Tim Hyams
Preceded by Sir Nick Pope	Deputy Chief of the General Staff; 2019–2022	Succeeded by Sharon Nesmith
Honorary titles
Preceded by Sir Tyrone Urch	Chief Royal Engineer; 2024–present	Incumbent
