= Army Individual Training Command =

- Active: 2025–present
- Country: United Kingdom
- Branch: British Army
- Size: 2-star command
- Part of: Standing Joint Command

Commanders
- Current commander: Major General Nick Cowley

The Army Individual Training Command (AITC) is a two star command of the British Army, responsible for training, education and leadership development. It commands five individual training, education and leadership development focused operations groups.

AITC is commanded by the General Officers Commanding (GOC) AITC, who concurrently holds the titles of Commandant of the Royal Military Academy Sandhurst and Director of Leadership. The current GOC AITC is Major General Nick Cowley OBE.

== History ==
In 2025 the Army Recruiting and Initial Training Command was disbanded with the training functions being transferred to the newly created Army Individual Training Command, and recruiting functions transferred to the new Directorate of Army Recruiting.

== Structure ==
- Army Individual Training Command
  - the Soldier Academy - Soldier Training
  - the Royal Military Academy Sandhurst (RMAS) – Officer Training
  - the Leadership, Education and Development Group (LEDG)
  - Army Adventurous Training Group (AATG) – Adventure Training
  - University Officer Training Corps (UOTC) – Officer Training at Universities

== Commander ==
- 2025 – present: Major General Nick Cowley OBE
