= Chris Bell (British Army officer) =

British Army officer

Major General Chris Bell CBE
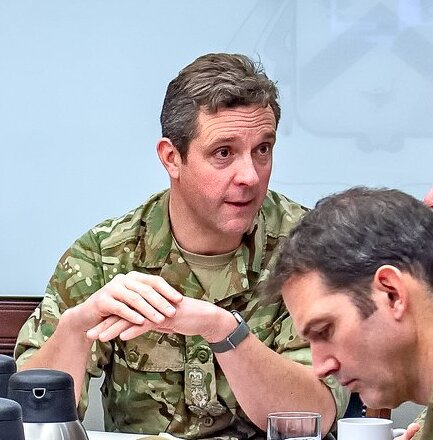
- Brigadier Chris Bell on a visit to the US Army University at Fort Leavenworth, 2019
- Education: University of Oxford
- Military career
- Allegiance: United Kingdom
- Branch: British Army
- Service years: 1994–2021
- Rank: Major General
- Unit: Scots Guards
- Commands: 1st Battalion Scots Guards; 77th Brigade
- Conflicts: Iraq War; War in Afghanistan
- Awards: Commander of the Order of the British Empire

Major General Christopher James Bell, CBE is a British retired senior officer in the British Army. He served in both the Iraq War and the War in Afghanistan.

== Early life and education ==
Bell studied geography at the University of Oxford.

== Military career ==
Bell was commissioned into the Scots Guards, alongside Ben Wallace, later the UK Defence Secretary. Bell's military career began with active service tours and public service. His Northern Irish service led to his promotion to Platoon Commander, Company Second-in-Command, Adjutant and Officer Commanding. His public duties involved acting as an Ensign at Queen Elizabeth II's 1997 birthday parade. He was deployed to Iraq in 2003 where he took part in Operation Telic.

=== Afghanistan ===
At the age of 35 he commanded a Mechanized battalion during the Battle of Musa Qala in Helmand Province. Speaking subsequently to the investigative journalist Stephen Grey, Bell recalled the situation being "in a pretty bad way" on their arrival, British positions being under heavy mortar and rocket fire, while the locals lived in the desert only briefly entering the town. Bell "began to plan ambushes" in response, although these never came to fruition before his company was moved on. Grey reports that Bell measured his success in Hellmund by the extent to which the population returned to a semblance of normality; "that was his own way of measuring their results 'rather than by killing'".

In November 2007, Bell led his company of Warriors as part of the mission to rescue Abdul Salaam Alizai, a former Taliban commander who required protection prior to defecting to the Afghan government later in the month, although at the time Bell had personal doubts as to the usefulness of their objective. His company maintained pressure to the east of Musa Qala which was "having an effect" in spite of the resurgent Taliban, who called Bell's company the "Desert Devils". By now, Bell had recognised the degree to which their American colleagues had improved in skills and tactics. Whereas a few years earlier, Bell suggests, the British were assumed to have learned lessons in urban warfare from multiple historical campaigns, such as The Troubles in Northern Ireland, which would suit them well in Helmand, unlike the inexperienced American forces. By the time of Operation Snakebite, however, Bell saw that US forces "were now, if anything, more attuned and adapted to winning counter-insurgency. Bell recalled, "the British were well ahead in 2003—but five years later the Americans were streets ahead". In 2008 Bell took part in another Operation Telic and commanded Operation Brockdale.

=== Later military career ===
In 2015, Bell was sent to Korea to represent the UK at US military headquarters, Seoul. This was followed by roles in Europe supporting the UK Chief-of-Staff. Two years later, now Brigadier, he attended the Army's Higher Command Course. This led to his taking command of the newly formed 77th Brigade, taking the formation from "concept to capability"; he also directed Programme Castle, a General Staff plan for modernisation.

=== Commands ===
Bell was made chief of staff of 20 Armoured Brigade in 2008, and became commanding officer of 1st Battalion Scots Guards in 2010. He was appointed Commander 77th Brigade — described as an elite "secretive Army unit that focuses on information warfare" — in May 2017, and Programme Director for Project Castle, which aims to develop a modern career structure in the Army, in December 2018. He became General Officer Commanding Army Recruiting and Initial Training Command in June 2020. He attended the United States Army Command and General Staff College between 2004 and 2006. Based at Fort Leavenworth, he completed two Master's degrees.

=== Leaving the military ===
Bell was asked to resign from army service in January 2021, because he was found to have lied to the Army Board about a personal relationship with a female subordinate under his command.

== Awards ==
Bell was awarded the Queen's Commendation for Valuable Service in recognition of his services in Iraq in October 2003. He was also appointed an Officer of the Order of the British Empire (OBE) in recognition of his services in Afghanistan on Operation Herrick in July 2008 and advanced to Commander of the Order of the British Empire (CBE) in the 2020 New Year Honours.

Military offices
Preceded by Paul Nanson	GOC Army Recruiting and Initial Training Command; 2020–2021	Succeeded by Sharon Nesmith
