= Pooley Sword =

Traditional cutler and provider of swords

- Type: Manufacture
- Industry: Sword manufacture
- Founded: November 2005
- Headquarters: Shoreham Airport, Shoreham-by-Sea, England
- Key people: Robert Pooley, Jane Sheridan
- Website: http://pooleysword.com/

Pooley Sword is a traditional cutler and provider of swords, dirks and lances to the British armed forces and also to many Commonwealth and other overseas defence forces. Following the August 2005 closure of Wilkinson Sword's Acton works, Robert Pooley, who had been commissioning swords from Wilkinson’s since 1964, purchased many of the company's drawings, product records, spares, and much of their tooling, including both heavy and light machinery, some dating back to the late 19th century.

== Sheffield workshops ==
Fundamental processes, including casting and blade manufacture, take place at the Sheffield workshops. Blanks are cut from hardened and tempered sheet steel, then ground to shape. Fullering of the blade is followed by polishing. Work in precious metals is carried out in Shoreham as well as in Sheffield.

== Shoreham workshops ==
Craftsmen further polish, silk screen, and acid-etch the blades to traditional standards. Chasing and coin-metal plating are performed at this stage. Strike and bend testing are followed by several stages of inspection before the sword is despatched. The process typically requires six to eight weeks.

== Historical services ==
The firm also offers refurbishment services on military and antique swords, dirks and lances of historical or sentimental value.

== Swords of Honour ==
Swords of Honour are awarded by a number of military colleges and academies to the outstanding cadet of his or her class. Having formerly been supplied by Wilkinson Sword, Swords of Honour currently supplied by Pooley Sword include those for:

- The Royal Military Academy Sandhurst
- The Duke of Westminster's Sword – Army Reserves
- Royal Air Force College Cranwell
- Britannia Royal Naval College – The Queen's Sword
- Commando Training Centre Royal Marines
- Royal Military College, Duntroon – Australia
- Royal Australian Naval College – HMAS Creswell
- Royal Military College Saint-Jean – Canada
- Royal New Zealand Air Force College
- New Zealand Army College
- Royal New Zealand Navy College
- Christ's Hospital School
- Australian Defence Force Academy
- Eton College Combined Cadet Force
- Shrewsbury School Combined Cadet Force

== Materials ==
Materials used in sword production must meet or exceed MOD specification. Blades are made from high-carbon steel. The guards and back plates are made from forged mild steel and hand embellished before nickel-plating. The guards for the RAF and Royal Navy Swords are cast in brass, chased and then gold-plated.

Grips historically made of shark skin are now made with that of rays, related fish species under less threat. The Brown Leather Service Scabbards are hand stitched pigskin.

== Bespoke swords ==
While ceremonial swords are typically crafted to long-standing MOD or regimental specification, a library of historic design elements, including military drawings, patterns and badges of regiments throughout the Commonwealth is also held. The company services private customers, incorporating family crests, mottos or novel blade designs such as Arabic swords and English Mamelukes. It creates bespoke presentation swords for overseas national and military commemorations.

== See also ==
- Sword making
- Forging
- Wilkinson Sword
