= E. H. H. Green =

British historian

Ewen Henry Harvey Green (16 October 1958 − 16 September 2006), known as E.H.H. Green or Ewen Green, was a British historian known for his work on 20th-century Britain and, in particular, the history of the 20th-century Conservative Party.

Born in Torbay and brought up in Brixham, he was educated at Churston Ferrers Grammar School where he developed his taste for history, which he went on to study at University College London where he was awarded the Derby studentship for the best first of 330 candidates. In 1980 he became a graduate student at St John's College, Cambridge, working on politics in the Edwardian period, before taking up a junior research fellowship at Brasenose College, Oxford in 1986.

In 1990, he went to Reading University before, in 1995, returning to Oxford as a tutor and fellow of Magdalen. For the university, he became a lecturer in modern history, rising to the position of reader in 2004.

His first book, The Crisis of Conservatism, focussed on the Edwardian period and appeared in 1995. His second book, Ideologies of Conservatism (2002), disclosed the unexpected long-term continuities in Conservative political thinking. His third, Thatcher (2006), examined the party in recent decades.

He was diagnosed with multiple sclerosis in 1999 but kept up his academic commitments for several years before taking early retirement. He died in 2006 at the age of 47.

== Published works ==
- The Crisis of Conservatism: The Politics, Economics and Ideology of the Conservative Party 1880-1914 (London: Routledge, 1995)
- Ideologies of Conservatism (Oxford: Oxford University Press, 2002).
- Thatcher (London: Hodder Arnold, 2006).
- Balfour (London: Haus Publishing, 2006).
- The Strange Survival of Liberal England: Political Leaders, Moral Values and the Reception of Economic Debate, eds. E. H. H. Green and D. M. Tanner (Cambridge: Cambridge University press, 2007)
