= Nick Cowley =

British Army officer

Major General Nicholas Cowley OBE
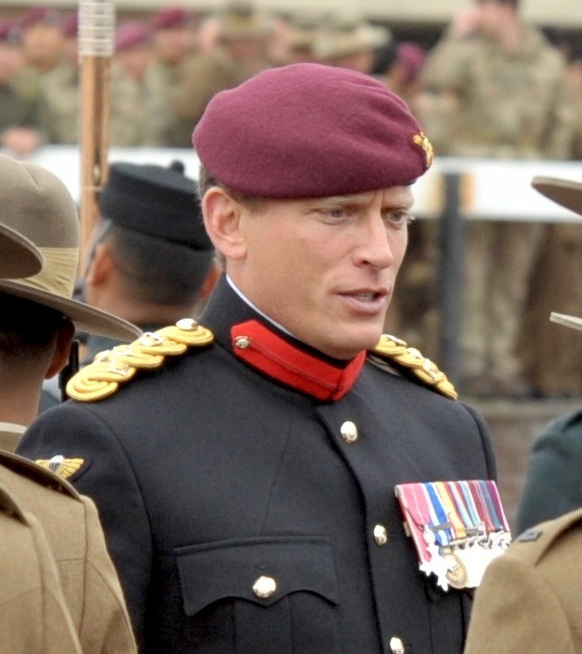
- Brigadier Cowley in 2021
- Military career
- Allegiance: United Kingdom
- Branch: British Army
- Service years: 2000 – present
- Rank: Major-General
- Commands: Queen's Royal Hussars; 16 Air Assault Brigade Combat Team; Commandant of the Royal Military Academy Sandhurst; Army Individual Training Command
- Conflicts: Kosovo War; Iraq War; War in Afghanistan
- Awards: Officer of the Order of the British Empire

Major-General Nicholas David Guise Cowley, OBE is a senior British Army officer who has been serving as the Commandant of the Royal Military Academy Sandhurst since October 2024, he also concurrently serves as the General Officer Commanding Army Individual Training Command.

== Early life ==
Cowley was educated at Ludgrove School.

== Military career ==
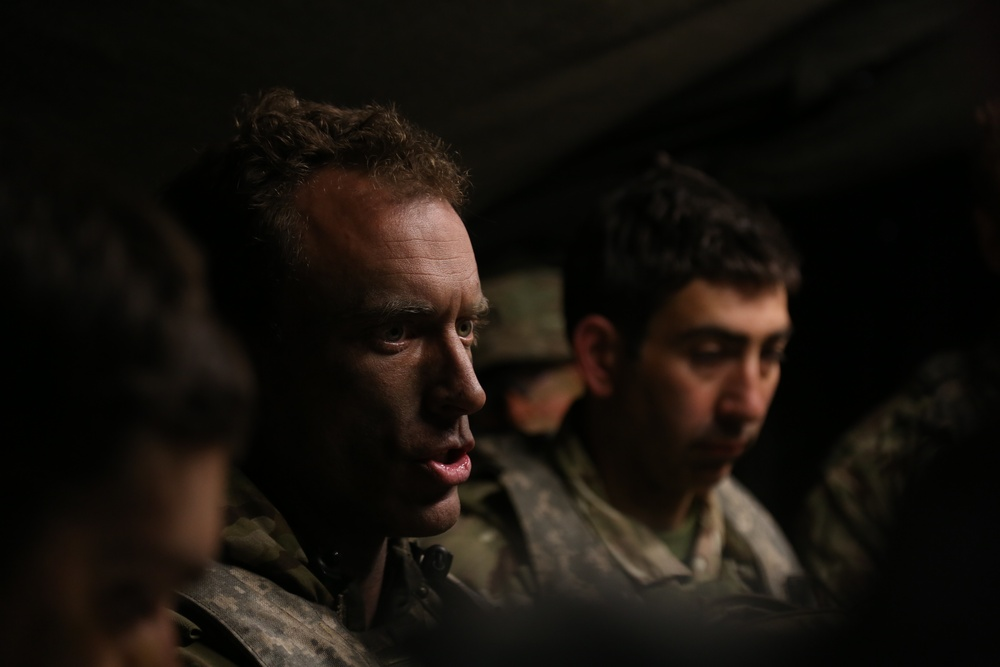
Cowley briefing soldiers during a multinational exercise, 2017

Cowley was commissioned into the Queen's Royal Hussars on 22 September 1997 and was deployed during the Kosovo War and the Iraq War. He was wounded during a tour in Afghanistan in 2013 and was deployed to Iraq again in 2016. He became commanding officer of the Queen's Royal Hussars in Germany in 2017, military assistant to the Chief of the General Staff in 2019, and commander of 16 Air Assault Brigade Combat Team in 2021. He was promoted major general on 18 October 2024, as he was appointed Commandant of the Royal Military Academy Sandhurst and General Officer Commanding Army Recruiting and Initial Training Command.

He was appointed a Member of the Order of the British Empire (MBE) in the 2015 Birthday Honours and advanced to Officer of the Order of the British Empire (OBE) in the 2020 New Year Honours.

Military offices
Preceded by Zachary Stenning	Commandant of the Royal Military Academy Sandhurst; 2024–present	Incumbent
Preceded by Tom Bewick	GOC Army Recruiting and Initial Training Command; 2024–2025	Succeeded by Post disbanded
