= Standing Joint Command =

Personnel support and UK operations command of the British Army

- Badge of Standing Joint Command
- Active: 2025–Present
- Country: United Kingdom
- Branch: British Army
- Type: Regional administrative command
- Role: UK Operations and Support
- Size: Three-star command
- Part of: British Army
- Garrison/HQ: Montgomery House, Aldershot Garrison

Commanders
- Commander, Standing Joint Command: Lieutenant General Paul Griffiths

Standing Joint Command, formerly Home Command, is a UK Operations and personnel support command of the British Army.

Prior to Home Command the formation was known as Personnel and Support Command. The post of Commander PSC previously replaced that of Adjutant-General to the Forces through the re-subordination of Support Command (British Army), adding responsibilities for the British Isles and civil contingencies tasks.

== Subordinate commands ==
- Army Individual Training Command
- Directorate of Army Recruiting
- Regional Command
- London District
- Army Personnel Centre
- Army Personnel Services Group

== Responsibilities ==
=== Commander, Home Command ===
In 2015 the post of the Army's Adjutant-General to the Forces was eliminated, and re-designated Commander Personnel and Support Command. In April 2016, Personnel and Support Command was renamed as Home Command.

Headquarters Home Command was located at Montgomery House in Aldershot and provided the Army’s personnel and institutional support. It assumed responsibility for the delivery elements of the Adjutant General’s portfolio: recruiting; individual training (officers and soldiers); career management and postings. The Command therefore includes the Military Secretary’s Organisation and the Army Personnel Centre (established 1996 at Kentigern House, Glasgow, responsible for records, careers, pay, pensions, documentation etc), the Army Recruiting and Training Division and the Royal Military Academy Sandhurst. Home Command also includes Regional Command to provide the Army’s institutional support, including: civil engagement, cadets, Firm Base and Garrisons, Recovery Capability, welfare, and veterans, including the Regular Reserve. In summary, it "provides personnel and institutional support to the Army."

By September 2020, Home Command consisted of Regional Command, London District, the Army Recruiting and Initial Training Command, the Army Personnel Centre and General Officer Commanding Scotland, and Sandhurst Group. Additional commands under Commander Home Command include Director Children and Young People and Head Personnel Service Group. In early 2017 there were 155 military and 511 civilian personnel making up the Army Personnel Centre. Later, Army Recruiting and Training Division was renamed as Recruiting and Initial Training Command.

=== Commander Standing Joint Command (UK) ===
Commander Home Command was also the Standing Joint Commander (SJC(UK)) responsible for the planning and execution of civil contingency operations within the UK landmass and territorial waters during any required Military Aid to the Civil Authorities. HQ SJC(UK) became Defence’s operational headquarters responsible for resilience operations and contingency planning in support of the civil authorities in the UK. This headquarters was formed in 2004, with the then Commander-in-Chief, Land Forces as the SJC(UK). In the intervening years the post was downgraded to a lieutenant general. When Personnel Support Command was established in 2015, it was decided that the role of SJC(UK) Commander was to transfer to Commander PSC in Aldershot. In due course PSC became Home Command. However, military and civilian personnel remained in Andover, thereby separating the Commander from his Headquarters.

The Territorial Army's Civil Contingency Reaction Forces (CCRFs), broken down by regional brigade, were intended to be a useful tool to provide support to civil authorities. A total of £1.8 million per year was allocated to the Civil Contingency Reaction Force between 2002 and March 2009 to fund role-specific training. But the CCRF was never mobilised, primarily because regular forces have been able to respond to crises in a shorter timescale, and a House of Commons answer on 5 November 2009 said that the concept had been discontinued. The focus was placed instead on a "framework of Joint Regional Liaison Officers and Brigade Reinforcement Teams [which would continue] to ensure effective liaison between regional army headquarters, local authorities and the emergency services."

In 2016 work commenced to relocate HQ SJC(UK) to Aldershot, bringing the Commander together with his staff and thus improving the operational effectiveness of the HQ. It totals 23 personnel from all three services. The transfer to Montgomery House in Aldershot was completed in late October 2017. It is militarily responsible for directing Operation Temperer anti-terrorist guard deployments, if ordered.

In 2020, HQ SJC(UK) organized military aid to the civil authorities to support the British government's response to the 2020 coronavirus epidemic in the United Kingdom, for example in the process of establishing the NHS Nightingale Hospitals. Major-General David Eastman temporarily held the appointment of Commander SJC(UK) from 25 May 2020 to 7 September 2020 during the pandemic.

In 2025, following the Strategic Defence Review, Home Command was renamed to Standing Joint Command to reflect the increased focus on UK Operations. Standing Joint Command "will oversee and command the Army’s contribution to the planning, preparation, and delivery of Defence support to UK national resilience." The role of the commander was re-titled to 'Commander Standing Joint Command'.

== Lists of Commanders ==
=== Commander Personnel and Support Command ===
- 2015 – 2016 Lieutenant-General James Bashall

=== Commander Home Command ===
- 2016 – 2018: Lieutenant-General James Bashall
- 2018 – 2021: Lieutenant-General Tyrone Urch
- 2021 – 2023: Lieutenant-General Ian Cave
- 2023 – 2025: Lieutenant-General Charles Collins

=== Commander Standing Joint Command ===
- 2025 – present: Lieutenant-General Paul Griffiths
