= Royal Military Academy Sandhurst =

British Army officer initial training centre

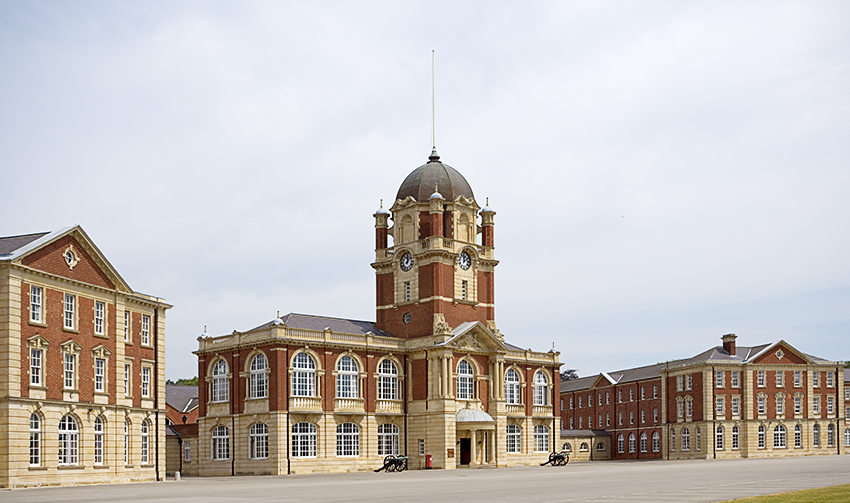
- New College buildings
- Motto: Serve to lead
- Commandant: Major-General Nicholas Cowley
- Commander: Brigadier Nicholas Wight-Boycott
- Type: Military academy
- Established: 1947 (merger of Royal Military Academy, Woolwich, founded 1741, and Royal Military College, Sandhurst, founded 1801)
- Parent institution: Army Individual Training Command
- Affiliations: British Army
- Location: Sandhurst, Berkshire, United Kingdom; 51°20′25″N 00°46′07″W
- March: Scipio (Slow) British Grenadiers (Quick)
- Colours: Red, yellow and blue
- Website: www.army.mod.uk/who-we-are/our-schools-and-colleges/rma-sandhurst/

The Royal Military Academy Sandhurst (RMAS or RMA Sandhurst), commonly known simply as Sandhurst, is one of several military academies of the United Kingdom and is the British Army's initial officer training centre. It is located in the town of Sandhurst, Berkshire, though its ceremonial entrance is in Camberley, Surrey, southwest of London. All British Army officers (including late-entry officers who were previously senior non-commissioned officers (SNCO's) or Warrant Officers) are trained at the academy, alongside other men and women from overseas.

The academy formerly commanded the University Officers' Training Corps (UOTC), which along with the General Staff Centre (GSC) and the Centre for Army Leadership (CAL) were collectively part of the formation known as Sandhurst Group (RMAS Group), part of Home Command. They now, like the academy, fall under the command of the Army Individual Training Command.

Sandhurst is the British Army equivalent of the Britannia Royal Naval College and of the Royal Air Force College Cranwell.

== Location ==
Despite its name, the Royal Military Academy Sandhurst's address is located in Camberley; the boundaries of the academy straddle the counties of Berkshire and Surrey. The county border is marked by a small stream known as the Wish Stream, after which the academy journal is named.

The "Main Gate" is located on the east of the Academy on the London Road in Camberley. The "College Town Gate", which is used for regular access, is located on the west of the Academy on Yorktown Road in Sandhurst.

== History ==
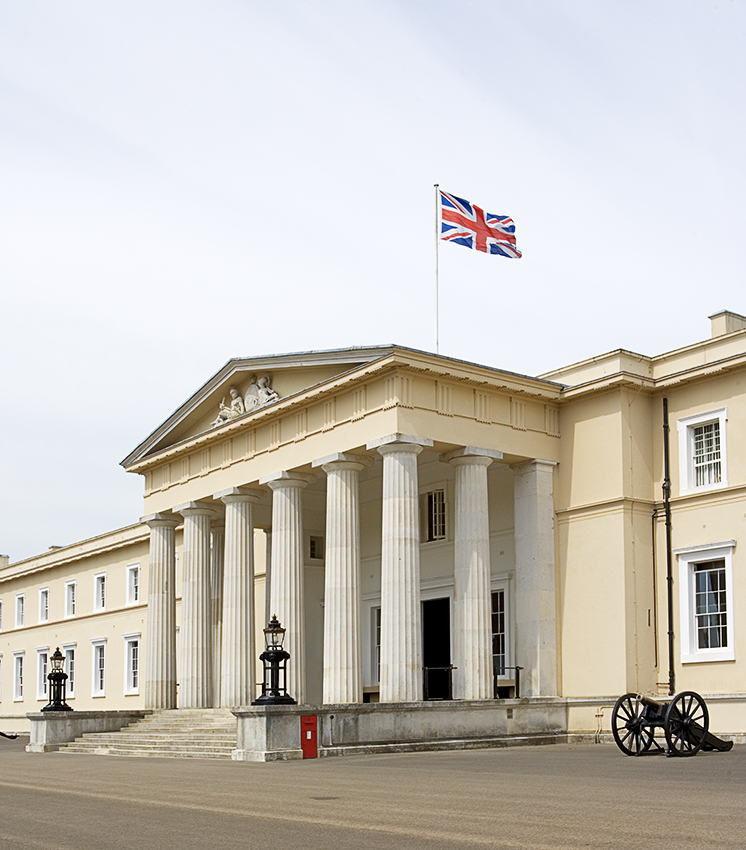
Old College buildings

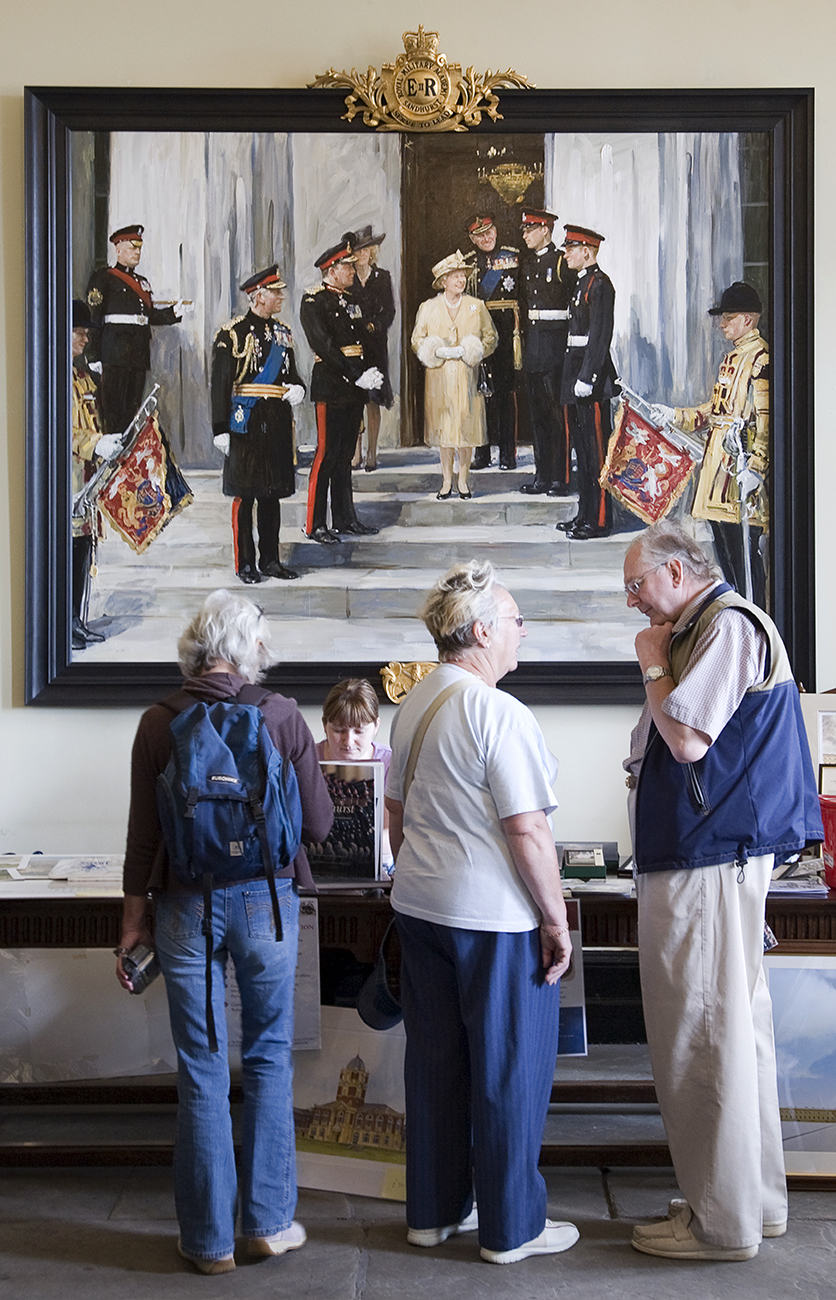
A RMAS community open day

The Royal Military Academy Sandhurst was formed on the site of the former Royal Military College (founded in 1801 for the training of officers for arms other than the Royal Artillery and Royal Engineers) in 1947 when it amalgamated with the Royal Military Academy in Woolwich (founded in 1741 for the training of officers for the Royal Artillery and Royal Engineers).

Following the ending of National Service in the UK and the closing of the Mons Officer Cadet School in Aldershot in 1972, the RMAS became the sole establishment for male initial officer training in the British Army, taking over the responsibilities of Mons for training Short Service Officer Cadets, Territorial Army officers, and those joining the Regular Army as graduates. For nearly half-a-century the welfare of overseas cadets was handled by Sandhurst volunteer Margaret Jones.

In 1984, the Women's Officer Training College Bagshot was also merged into Sandhurst. In 1992, a new Commissioning Course finally unified the training of male, female, and overseas cadets.

The Royal Military Academy Sandhurst Collection illustrates the history of the Royal Military Academy, Woolwich, the Royal Military College, Sandhurst, and the Royal Military Academy Sandhurst. The collection includes the Gentlemen Cadet registers, historic archives, uniforms, paintings, photographs, and other artefacts.

For the 1948 Summer Olympics in London, the newly created Academy hosted the running leg of the modern pentathlon competition.

In 2012, Sandhurst accepted a £15 million donation from the government of United Arab Emirates for the Zayed Building, an accommodation block, named after the UAE's founding ruler. In 2013, Sandhurst accepted a donation of £3 million from the Government of Bahrain for the refurbishment of Mons Hall, named in honour of the men who fell in the Battle of Mons. It was renamed as King Hamad Hall in honour of the King of Bahrain, which generated some controversy in the United Kingdom.

In 2015, Colonel Lucy Giles was appointed as the first female college commander of Sandhurst.

In 2019, Sandhurst gained widespread media attention in Britain after cadet Olivia Perks took her own life after an alleged affair with a superior at Sandhurst and amid fears she was going to be dismissed. In May 2023, an inquest into her death found that the army missed chances to prevent Perks's suicide in failing to recognise signs of stress.

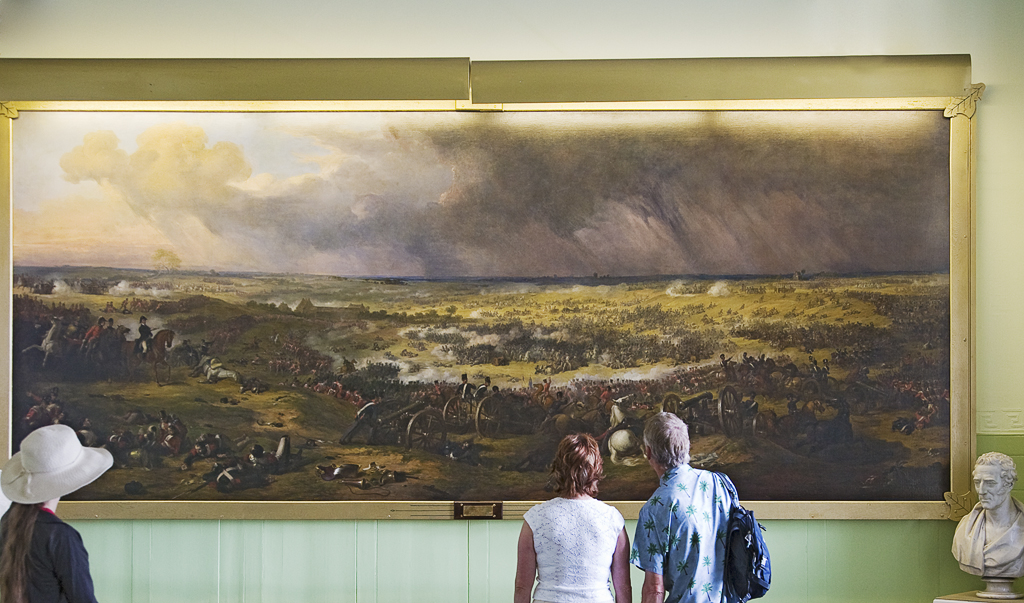
The Wellington Room, named after Field Marshal The Duke of Wellington, showing a depiction of the Battle of Waterloo and the Duke's bust (RMAS Collection)

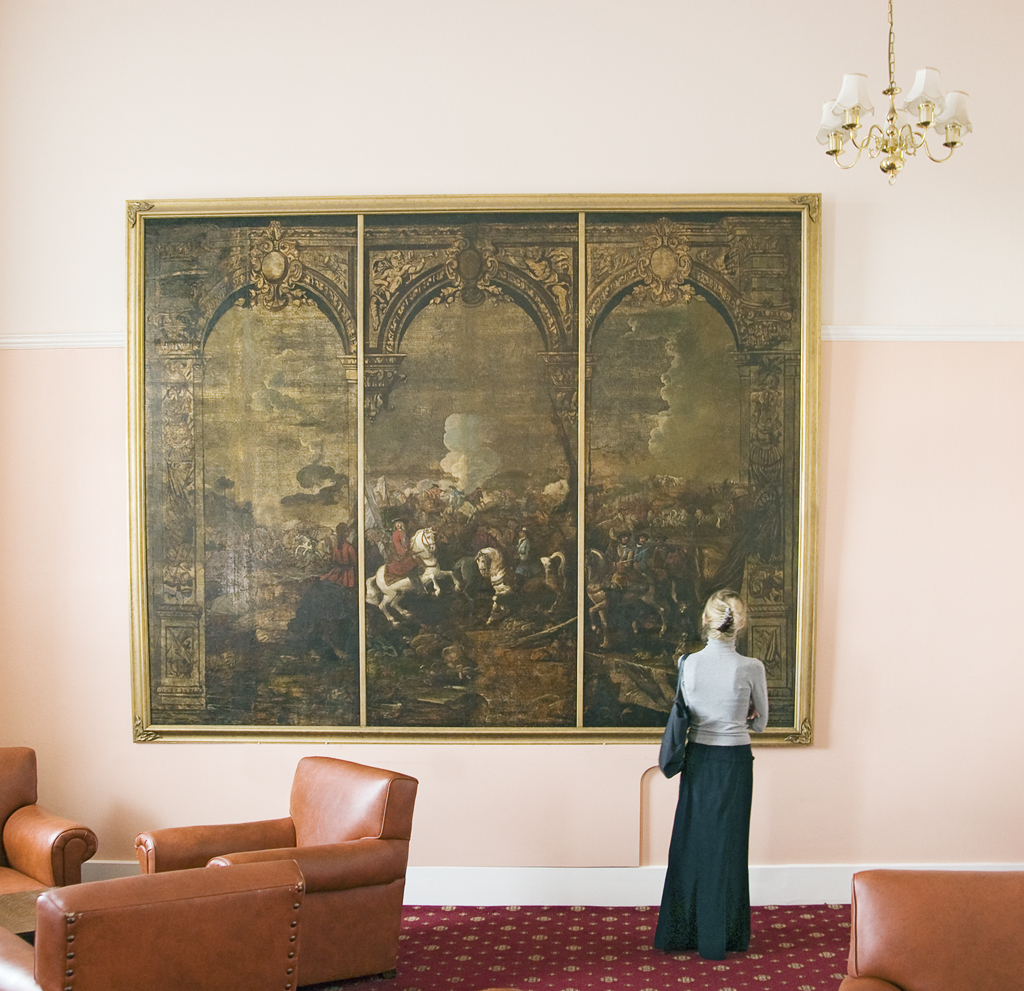
Marlborough Room, showing a triptych painting on leather of the Battle of Blenheim by Jan van Huchtenburg (RMAS Collection)

== Selection ==
Potential officers, for regular, reserve, or professional qualified service, are identified by the Army Officer Selection Board (formerly the Regular Commissions Board, or RCB) situated in Westbury in Wiltshire. Assessment for regular or reserve direct entry service is undertaken at the same time, in the same groups, to the same standard. Nearly 10 per cent of British cadets are female and nearly 10 per cent of all cadets come from overseas. More than eighty percent of entrants are university graduates, although a degree is not required for admission.

== Instructors ==
The Royal Military Academy Sandhurst instructors' cadre (group of trainers) is run once every year. The aim is to select 30 senior non-commissioned officers (SNCOs) from 60 over the course of 3–4 weeks. Instructors can come from any part of the British Army although most are historically from the Infantry. Typically before the 60 candidates arrive on the cadre, they would have had to have passed a 'Divisional pre-selection' course, meaning it would not be unusual for over double the 60 places to be contested. Sergeants, Staff/Colour Sergeants (Colour Sergeants from Infantry units) attend the Instructors Cadre. The Instructors Cadre is known to be demanding, both physically and mentally, compressing all the prominent physical tests and mental assessments that each Officer Cadet undertakes over the year course, into 3/4 weeks. No other instructor posting has a selection to pass in order to be a part of a training team.

== Courses ==
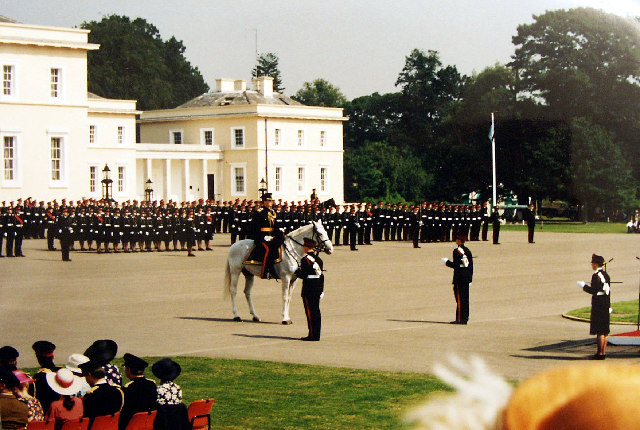
Passing out parade

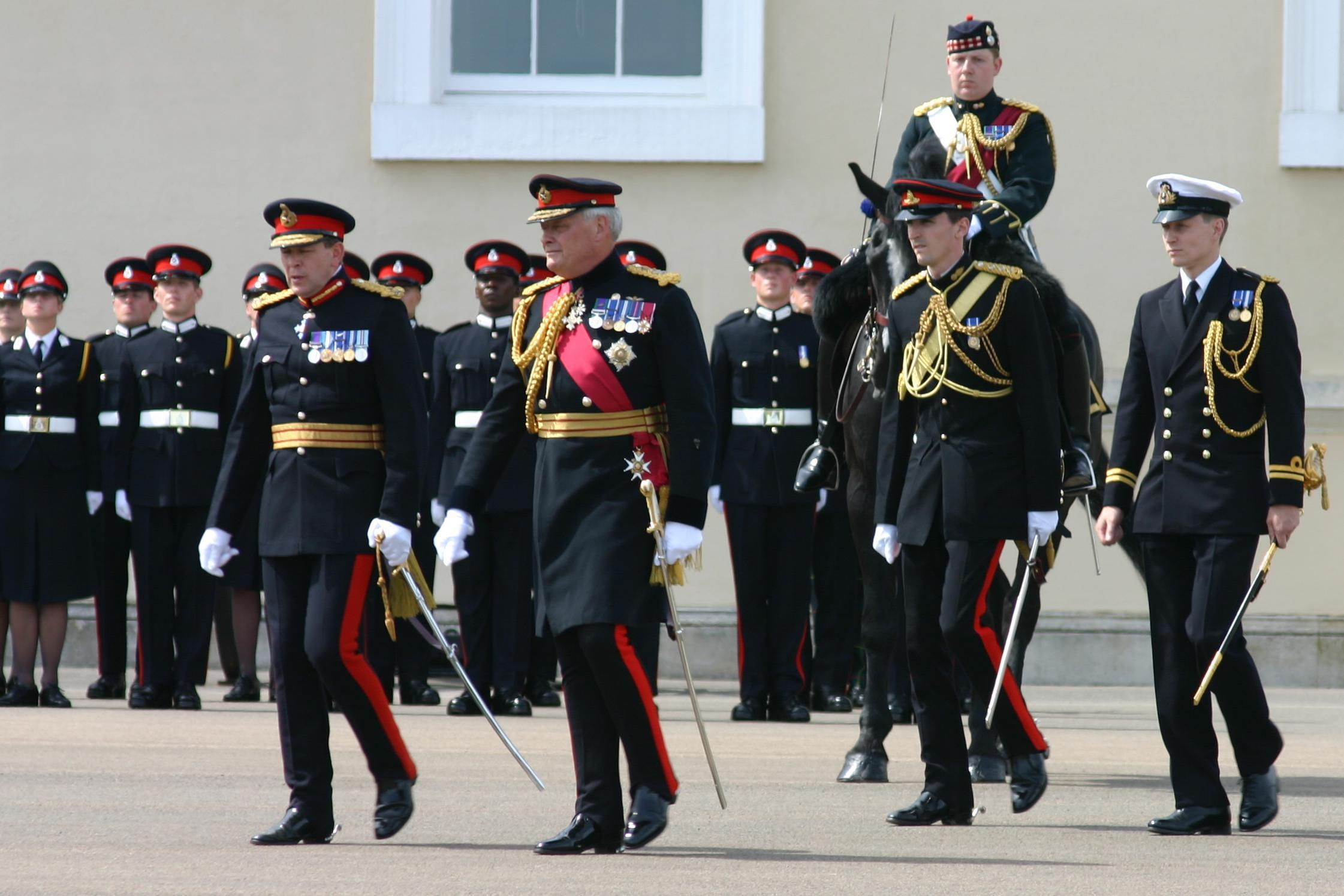
New colours are presented to RMAS, June 2005. Prince Harry (as Officer Cadet Wales at attention, to the left of the horse) is on parade.

There are three commissioning courses run at the academy. All are accredited by various academic and professional institutions, in particular the Chartered Management Institute. The Regular Commissioning Course, and increasingly the Short Course, are attended by international officer cadets from other nations' land forces. The three courses are:

1. The Regular Commissioning Course, which lasts 44 weeks, for Direct Entry officers into the Regular service.

2. The Short Commissioning Course, which is for Army Reserve officers and both regular and reserve service professionally qualified officers (e.g., doctors, dentists, nurses, lawyers, pharmacists, veterinary surgeons and chaplains), which lasts eight weeks. The short course consists of four training modules; the first two, Modules A and B, can be completed under the supervision of RMAS with University Officers' Training Corps over a number of weekends, or at RMAS where each module lasts two weeks. The final two modules, modules C and D, of the Officers' training and assessment must be conducted at Sandhurst. This training can all be completed in an eight-week period at RMAS, or over a number of years. Upon completion, Officer Cadets become Second Lieutenants in the Army Reserve (including Officer Training Corps, OTC/UOTC), or Captains in PQO roles.

3. The Late Entry Officer Course (LEOC) for senior soldiers commissioning from the ranks.

The RMAS has an academic faculty staffed by civilian researchers with expertise in Communication and Applied Behavioural Science, Defence and International Affairs, and War Studies.

Unlike some other national military academies such as the United States Military Academy in the United States, l'École spéciale militaire de Saint-Cyr in France, the Royal Military College of Canada in Canada, the Pakistan Military Academy in Pakistan, the Nigerian Defence Academy in Nigeria or the Australian Defence Force Academy in Australia, Sandhurst is not a university. It only works with the Open University to award the Regular Commissioning Course 120 credit points towards a distance learning Honours Degree in International Studies which ultimately requires 360 points. Graduate entrants can gain a Postgraduate Certificate in Leadership and Conflict Studies from the Regular Commissioning Course and then embark on a pathway post-commissioning to complete a full master's degree from a university through further electives and a dissertation. Alternatively, non-graduate cadets have the opportunity to earn a BSc in Leadership and Strategic Studies through their military service, which is awarded by the University of Reading.

== Sandhurst Group ==
Sandhurst Group Royal Military Academy Sandhurst Group
- Country: United Kingdom
- Branch: British Army
- Type: Training and Leadership Development
- Size: 1 Star Command
- Part of: Standing Joint Command
- Garrison/HQ: RMA Sandhurst

Commanders
- Commander RMAS Group: Brigadier Nick Wight-Boycott

Under the reforms outlined in the British Army's restructuring plan Future Soldier, the Sandhurst Group formation was reorganised, and is under the control of Standing Joint Command. The Commander RMAS Group holds the rank of Brigadier and is the overall commander of the Group and the operations of the Royal Military Academy.

The unit is Headquartered at RMA Sandhurst, and takes its name from the Academy. The insignia used for Sandhurst Group is the same used by the Royal Military Academy and the badge of the Academy features on the Formation Flash for Sandhurst Group.

== Organisation ==
In overall command of the RMAS is the Commander - a post established in January 2025 as part of the Sandhurst Group re-organisation where RMAS became a brigadier post as opposed to a major-general post. Whilst there is still a Commandant above the Commander, their post is now a mainly ceremonial one. The Commandant's day-to-day job is now to be in charge of the new initial training command. The Commander RMAS is supported by a Deputy Commander (colonel). The senior warrant officer, the Academy Sergeant Major (AcSM), is one of the most senior warrant officers in the British Army. The regular commissioning course is split into three terms, each lasting fourteen weeks (referred to as the Junior, Intermediate and Senior Divisions, identified by differently coloured badges). Basic army training is covered in the first five weeks, which, by reputation, are the most gruelling (the families of the cadets are encouraged to support the cadets' morale by maintaining home contacts). The main RMAS Commissioning Courses start in January, May and September of each year. Each intake numbers approximately 200 cadets, each of whom is assigned to a platoon within one of two/three companies. Platoons are commanded by captains, with a colour sergeant who takes the main burden of day-to-day training, especially during the first term (unlike West Point, RMAS entrusts the majority of officer training to Senior Non-Commissioned Officers). There can be as many as seven companies within RMAS at any one time. There can be additional companies of Army Reserve or 'professionally qualified officers' in the Academy who take part in shorter (1–2 months) commissioning courses. Each company is commanded by a major and named after a famous battle or campaign in which the British Army fought.

Officer cadets on the regular commissioning course nominate two regiments or corps that they seek to join during Junior Term. This choice may be influenced by their instructors, by family connections, or by regimental history, among other factors. Each regiment is looking for different qualities in its officers, and each cadet is considered on a case-by-case basis. At the beginning of Senior Term corps and regiments hold interviews, known as Regimental Selection Boards, to assist the corps and regiments in making offers to Officer Cadets. There can be competition among units for strong cadets and, conversely, among cadets for prestigious or specialised units. In the past, cadets might have been offered a so-called "confirmed cadetship", whereby they would effectively accept a commission into a given regiment prior to commencing the Commissioning Course. As of the January 2023 intake, Confirmed Cadetships are no longer offered to Officer Cadets, other than in very rare cases including technical expertise or a cadet being aged 30 or older when they start the commissioning course. Cadets on the short course will have already been sponsored by a reserve unit, a professionally qualified unit, or a University Officers' Training Corps, and will return to their unit post completion of the course.

=== Regular Army ===
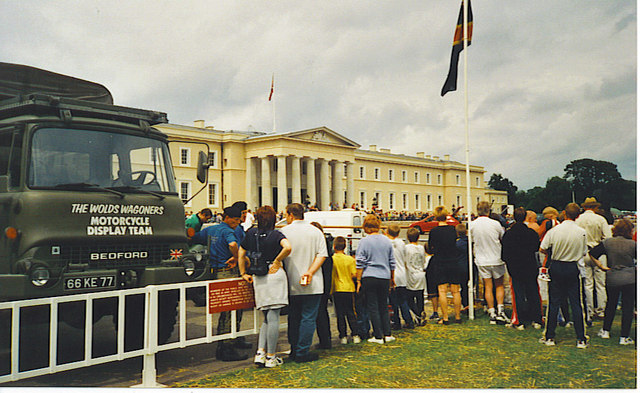
Open Day at the Royal Military Academy Sandhurst

A small number of regular army units are based at the RMAS to provide support for the colleges and their training:

- Gurkha Demonstration Company (Sittang): this is a company-sized unit drawn from all units of the Brigade of Gurkhas, to provide an opposing force in battle training for the cadets.
- 44 Support Squadron, Royal Logistic Corps: this is the RMAS's permanently based transport, logistic and signals support unit.
- Until 1984, the RMAS had its own band—The RMAS Band Corps.

== Sovereign's Parade ==
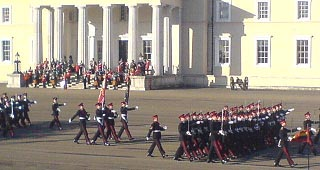
The 149th Sovereign's Parade in front of Old College

The first Sovereign's Parade was held on 14 July 1948, in front of King George VI. Three Sovereign's Parades are held each year outside the Old College to mark the "passing-out" and the final parade at Sandhurst of the Senior Division. All cadets, except for those who have been back-termed through injury or other reasons, are inspected by the Sovereign (or their representative), participate in the Trooping the Colour and parade past the Sovereign (or his representative) and guests. Guests consist of invited dignitaries and friends and families of the graduating cadets.

One of the highlights of the Parade is Trooping the Colour. The Colour trooped is the Sovereign's Banner and the current banner is the third generation of itself, presented by Elizabeth II in March 1999; the first Sovereign's Banner, known as the "King George V's Banner", was presented by George V on 6 November 1918 and the second one was presented by Queen Elizabeth on 27 October 1978.

The honour of Trooping the Colour falls to the Sovereign's Platoon, the then-Champion Company/Platoon. The Sovereign's Platoon, which wears multi-coloured lanyards, using the colours of all three Divisions, is selected on merit and is the best platoon amongst the Division; these officer cadets are chosen from a competition in drill, orienteering, shooting and a cross-country race, ensuring they are of the best in endurance and teamwork.

In the past, the Sovereign's Platoon from the Senior Division formed the Colour Party with the Banner on the left flank of the parade; after the inspecting officer had completed inspection, the Colour Party would move to the centre place of the parade before the Saluting Base, awaiting the new Sovereign's Platoon to take possession of the Banner. The new Sovereign's Platoon would keep the Banner until handing it to the next Sovereign's Platoon in the next Sovereign's Parade; they had the privilege of leaving the parade before other divisions after the Senior Division officer cadets had marched into the Old College and the remainders of the parade would salute the banner while they were leaving the parade square.

Nowadays, the handover of the Sovereign's Banner from the senior Sovereign's Platoon to a new one dissipates. What replaces it is that the Sovereign's Platoon of Senior Division, instead of the new one, marches to receive the Banner. The Ensign, at the end of the parade, also marches into the Old College whilst carrying the Banner.

At the end of the Parade, the Colours and the Senior Division leave the parade ground via the Grand Steps of the Old College building. They are followed by the Academy Adjutant on horseback (the origins of this tradition are unclear).

== Awards ==
Each Commissioning Course has awards granted to outstanding cadets. The following awards are presented during the Sovereign's Parade. Others are merely listed in the Parade programme. A system of Cadet Government also recognises merit by the appointment of Senior Under Officers, Junior Under Officers, Cadet Sergeants and Cadet Corporals.

List of awards
Name	Details	Refs
Sword of Honour	Awarded to the Officer Cadet considered by the Commandant to be the best of the intake. The Sword of Honour is donated and crafted by Pooley Sword.	
King's Medal	Awarded to the Officer Cadet who has achieved the best overall results in military, academic and practical studies. Presented on behalf of The Sovereign.	
International Sword	Awarded to the International Cadet considered by the Commandant to be the best of the intake. Donated by the Ministry of Defence, the State of Kuwait, in memory of Sheikh Ali Al Sabah, the former Defence Minister, the State of Kuwait.	
International Award	Awarded to the International Cadet who has achieved the best overall results in military, academic and practical studies. The International Award is donated by the State of Qatar.	
MacRobert Sword	Awarded to the Officer Cadet considered by the Commandant to be, overall, the best of the Short Commissioning Course. This sword is also donated by the MacRobert Trust and produced by Pooley Sword.	
King Hussein Award	Awarded to the most improved International Cadet. Donated by the Hashemite Kingdom of Jordan in memory of the late King Hussein of Jordan.	
The Hodson's Horse Merit Award	Awarded to the International Cadet who has produced an overall performance of particular merit. Donated by the Hodson's Horse British Officers' Memorial Trust.	
The Commandant's Merit Award	Awarded at the discretion of the Commandant for exceptional achievement.	
The Commandant's Coin	In recognition of sustained and exemplary performance of merit and superb representation of their countries the Royal Military Academy.	
Sandhurst Medal	In December 2016, the academy and its charitable trust created the Sandhurst Medal. Unlike most British medals, it is not awarded or authorised by the Sovereign and is instead awarded privately by the Sandhurst Trust. It may only be awarded to international cadets who have passed out from Sandhurst, not British graduates, and must be purchased for £250. Notable graduates such as Abdullah II of Jordan have mounted the medal on their military uniforms.	

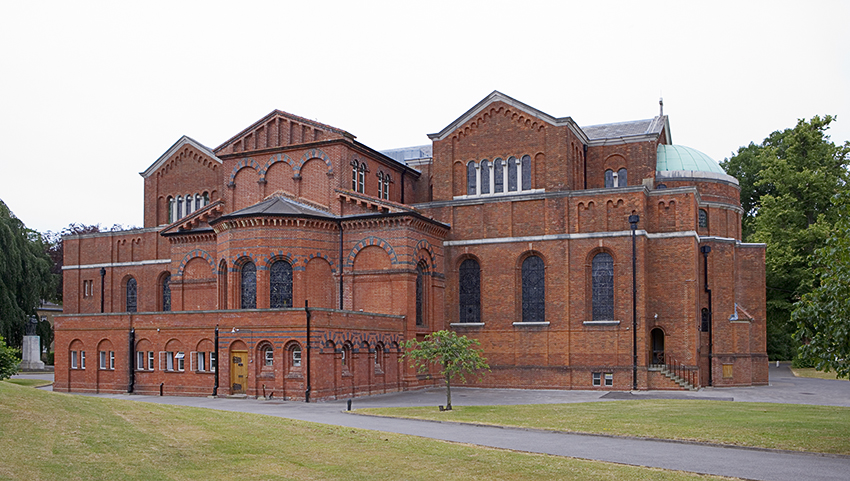
Royal Memorial Chapel south aspect

Sandhurst Medal ribbon bar

== Chapel ==
There are two chapels within the academy, the Roman Catholic Chapel (Christ the King) and the Royal Memorial Chapel, dedicated as Christ Church, which also contains the South Africa Chapel, which was originally the sanctuary of the second Chapel before it was enlarged. The original chapel was what is now known as the British Indian Army Memorial Room. The Royal Engineers designed the original Chapel, which features red brick, terracotta moulding, interlocking pediment copies and corbels in 1879. The chapel was dedicated by King George VI on 2 May 1937, after architect Captain Arthur C. Martin enlarged the building in a Byzantine style. The Memorial stained glass and Windows in the chapel honour the Brigade of Guards, Rifle Brigade, Royal Fusiliers, and the Hampshire Regiment, among other units. Some memorials, including one honouring alumni of the US Military Academy at West Point, are carved into the black marble flooring. On panels devoted to the particular campaigns in which they died, are the names of former cadets killed in action. At intervals above the panels are circular tablets to the memory of College Governors. The names of former cadets who have died on active service in the field, or elsewhere are listed in the spaces between the panels. Other tablets on the walls of the porch of the Church were moved there from the old Chapel. At the nave near the chancel steps, old Regimental colours hang from the pillars.

The college cemetery has (in 2026) 22 graves and headstones from both World Wars, maintained by the Commonwealth War Graves Commission.

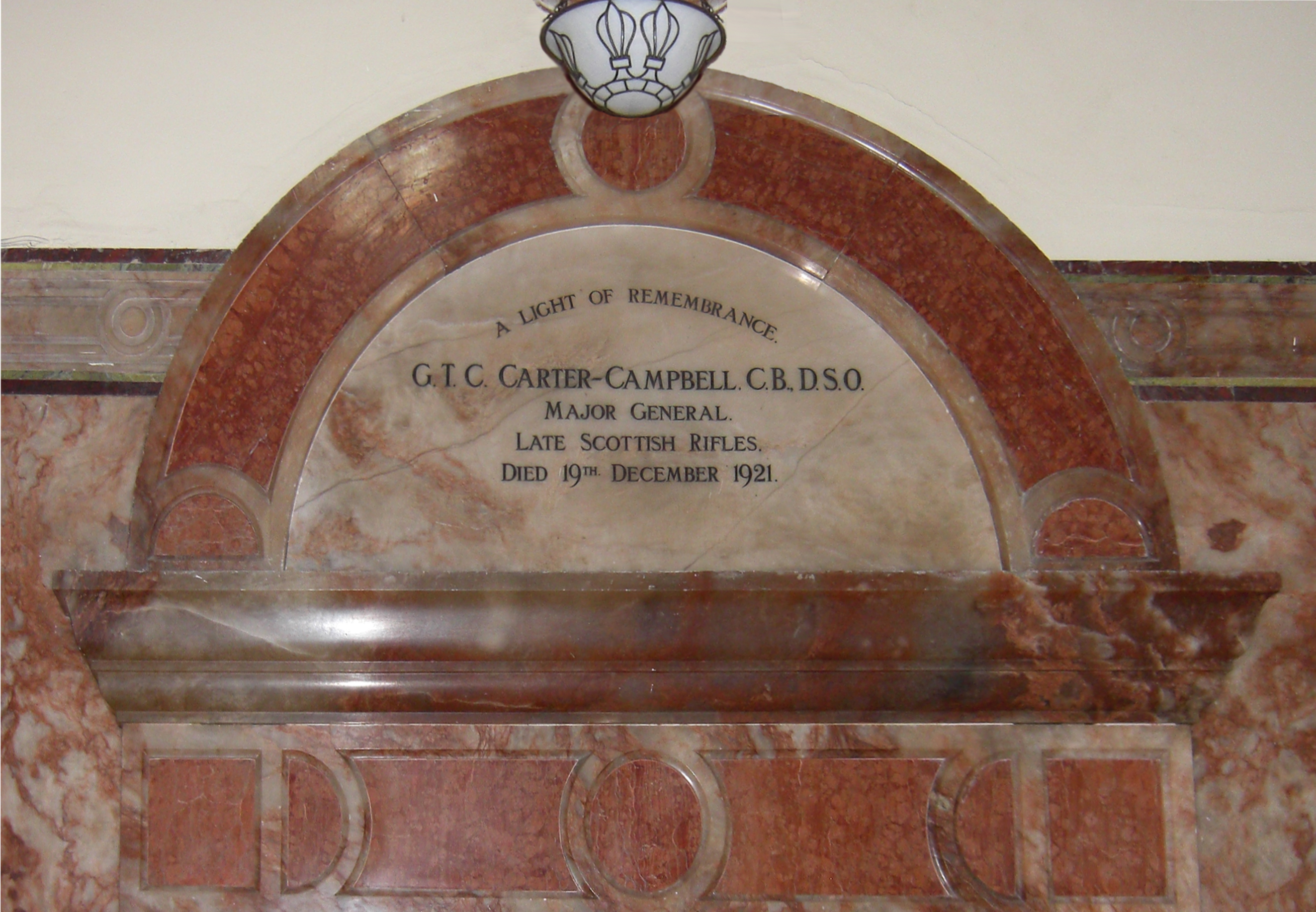
The dedication to Major-General George Carter-Campbell in The Royal Memorial Chapel

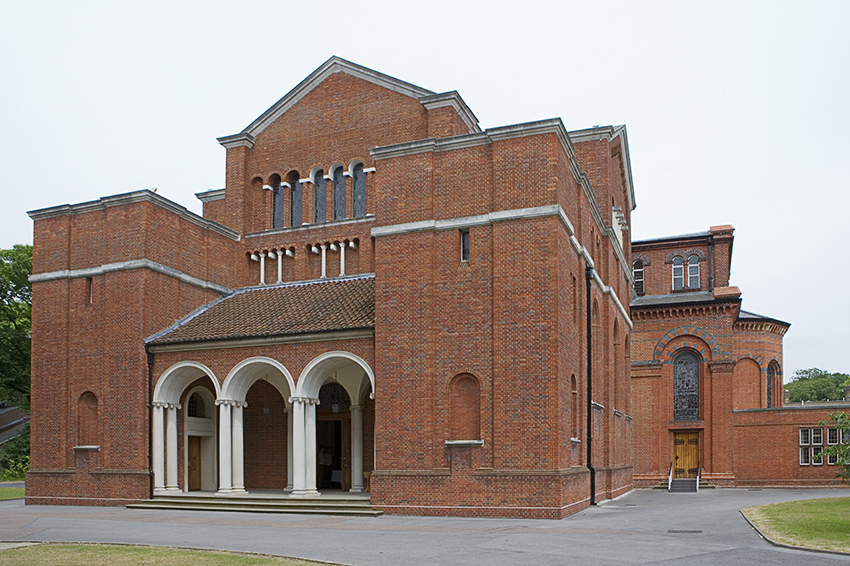
Royal Memorial Chapel portico

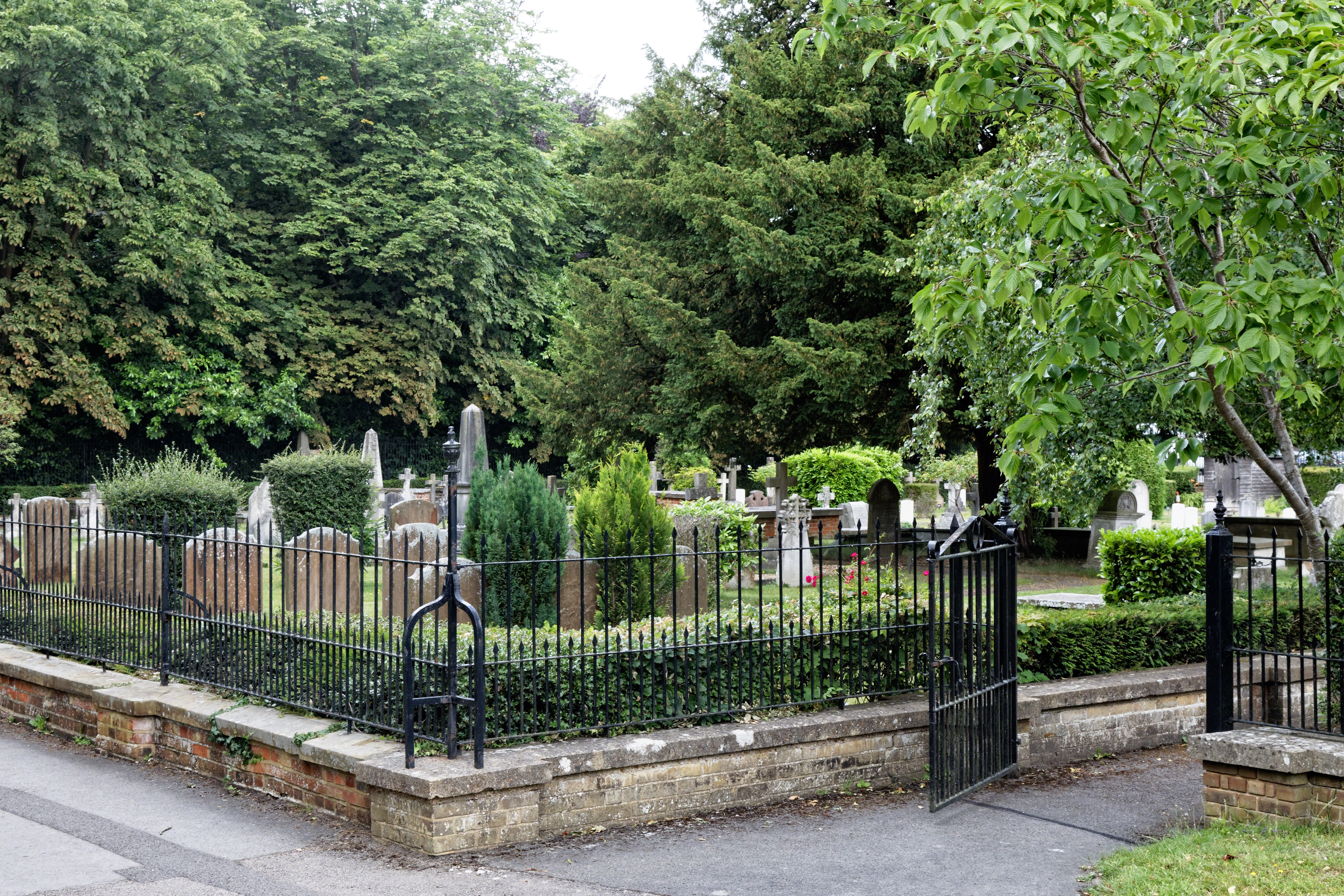
Entrance to the cemetery

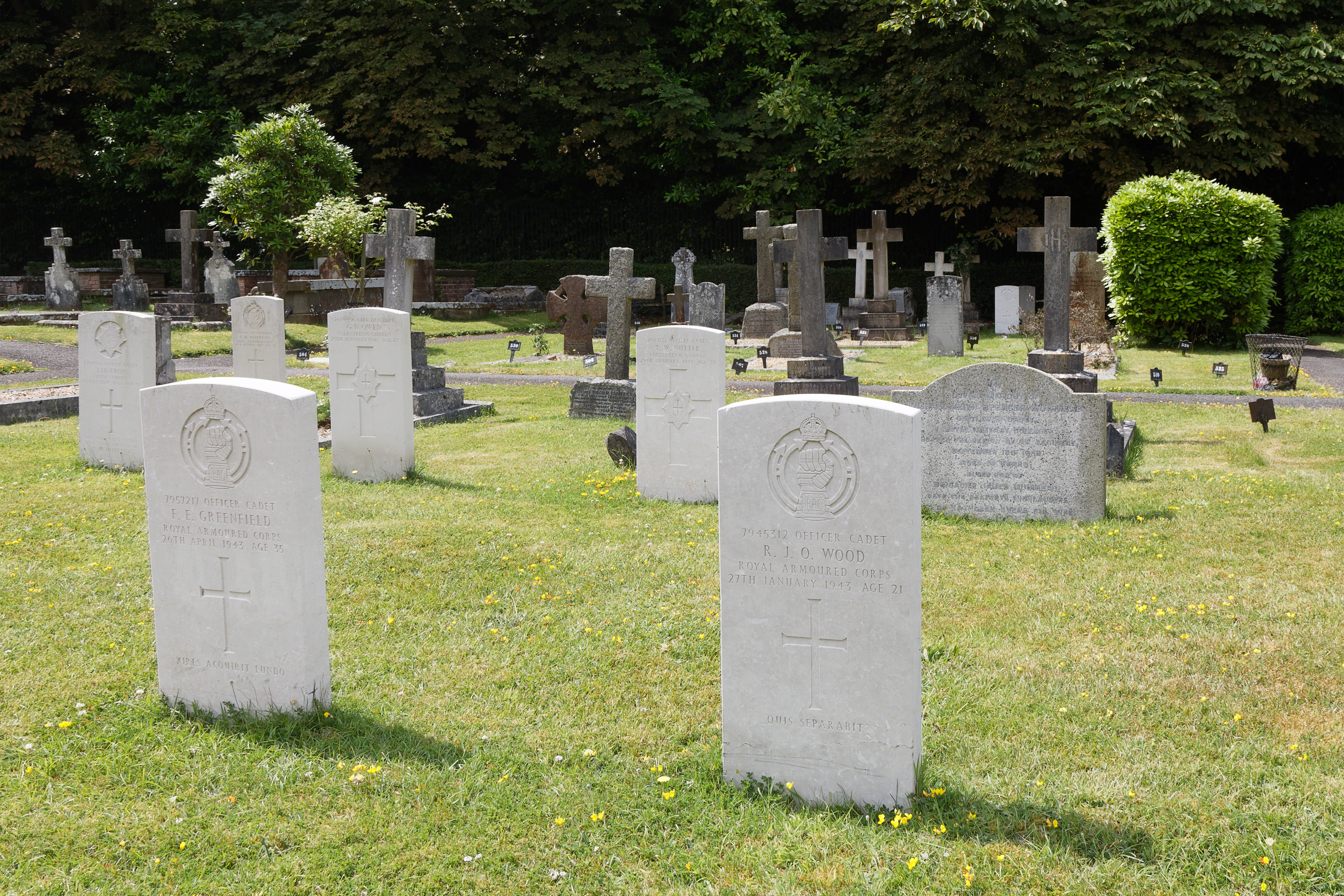
Foreground: some of the Commonwealth War Graves Commission maintained headstones and graves

== Lineage ==
Lineage
Royal Military Academy Sandhurst	Royal Military Academy	Royal Military Academy
Royal Military Academy Sandhurst	Royal Military Academy	East India Company Military Seminary
Royal Military Academy Sandhurst	Royal Military College, Sandhurst	
Royal Military Academy Sandhurst	Mons Officer Cadet School	
Royal Military Academy Sandhurst	Women's Royal Army Corps College	

== See also ==
- List of governors and commandants of Sandhurst
- Sandhurst Competition
