= James Bashall =

British Army general

Lieutenant General James Bashall CB CBE
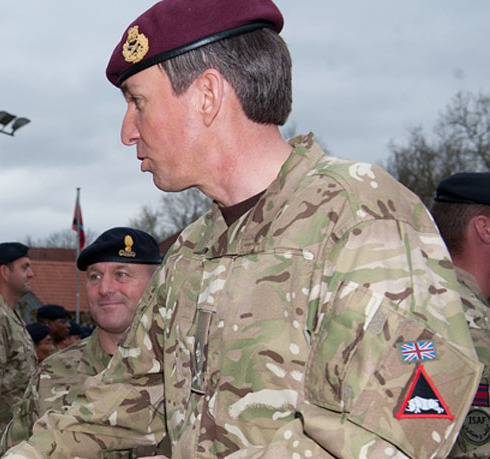
- Major General Bashall in 2012
- Born: 3 April 1962 (age 64); Marlborough, Wiltshire, England
- Military career
- Allegiance: United Kingdom
- Branch: British Army
- Service years: 1984–2018
- Rank: Lieutenant General
- Commands: Home Command; 1st (UK) Armoured Division; 1st Mechanized Brigade; 2nd Battalion The Parachute Regiment
- Conflicts: War in Afghanistan; Iraq War
- Awards: Companion of the Order of the Bath; Commander of the Order of the British Empire; Mentioned in Despatches

Lieutenant General James Ian Bashall, CB, CBE (born 3 April 1962) is a former British Army officer who served as Commander Home Command from 2015 to 2018. From 2019 to 2023 he was the National President of the Royal British Legion.

== Early life and education ==
Bashall was born on 3 April 1962 in Marlborough, Wiltshire, England. He was educated at Marlborough College, a private boarding school.

== Military career ==
Bashall was commissioned in to the Parachute Regiment in 1984. By 2002 he had become Commanding Officer of the 2nd Battalion The Parachute Regiment serving in Afghanistan.

He commanded 1st Mechanized Brigade based in Basra in Southern Iraq during Operation Telic in 2007. He was appointed Director Army Division of the Defence Academy at Shrivenham in January 2009 and went on to be Chief of Joint Force Operations in December 2009: in this capacity he masterminded the covert Special Air Service rescue operations across war-torn Libya in early 2011. He became General Officer Commanding 1st (UK) Armoured Division in April 2011, Chief of Staff, Operations at the Permanent Joint Headquarters, Northwood in August 2012 and Commander Personnel and Support Command in June 2015 (his role was re-designated Commander Home Command in May 2016). Bashall retired from the British Army on 27 October 2018.

== Later life ==
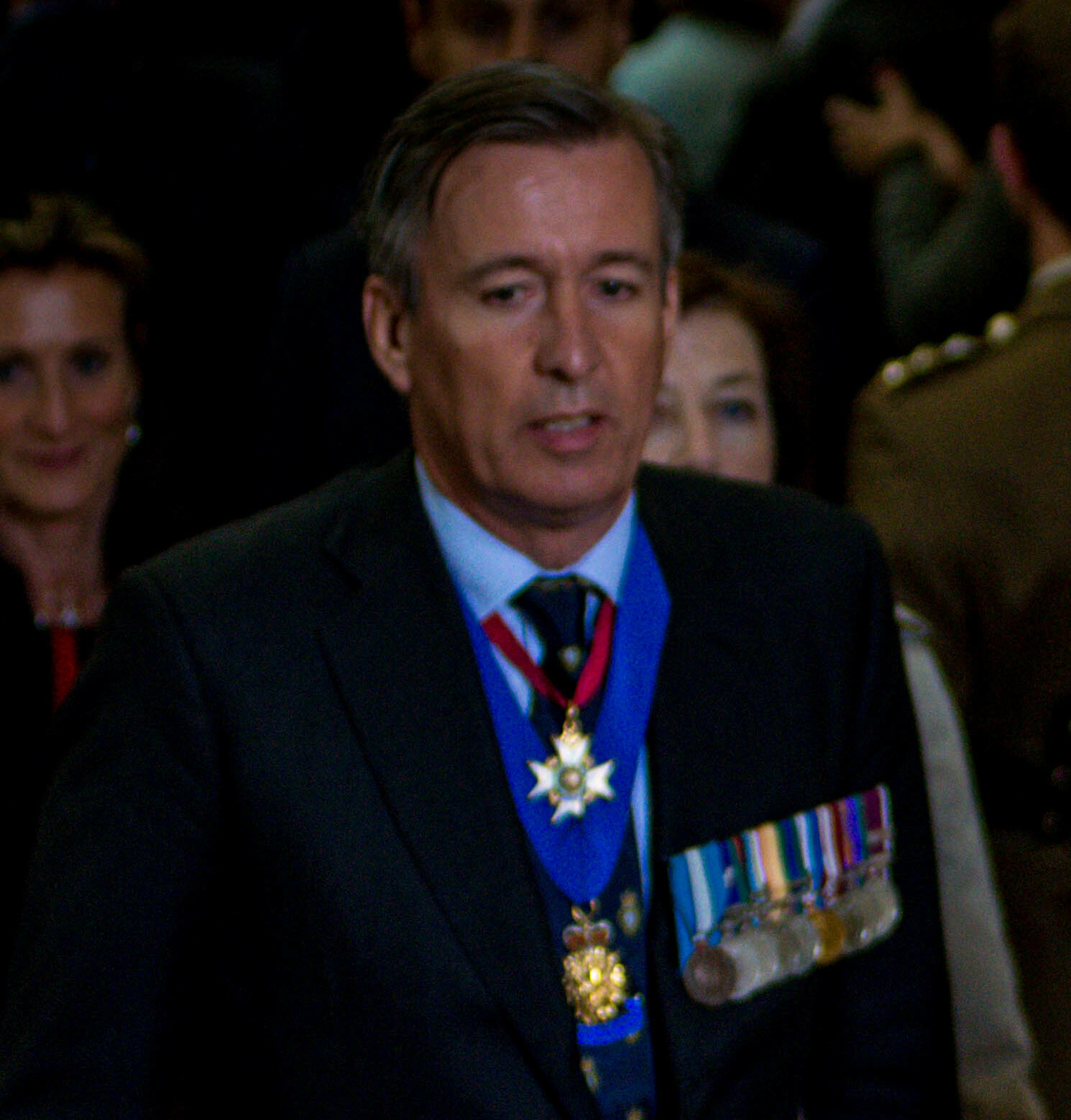
Bashall at the 75th anniversary of D-Day service in 2019

Bashall was appointed as the National President of the Royal British Legion in May 2019. When appointed, Bashall said "It is an honour to be appointed as the National President of The Royal British Legion, a charity with an esteemed history, and one that plays a vital role in today’s Armed Forces community." He served in his position until May 2023.

Military offices
Preceded by Adrian Bradshaw	General Officer Commanding 1st (UK) Armoured Division; 2011–2012	Succeeded by James Chiswell
Preceded by Gerald Berragan	Commander Personnel and Support Command (re-designated Commander Home Command in 2016); 2015–2018	Succeeded by Tyrone Urch
