= No. 22 Group RAF =

Royal Air Force operations group

- Group badge
- Active: 1918–1919; 1936; 1936–1940; 1943–1972; 2006–present
- Country: United Kingdom
- Branch: Royal Air Force
- Type: Group headquarters
- Role: Military education and training
- Size: 3,800 military & 1,900 civilian personnel; 53 locations; 420 aircraft
- Part of: RAF Air Command
- Headquarters: RAF High Wycombe
- Motto: Semper resurgens (Latin for 'Always rising again')
- Website: Official website

Commanders
- Current commander: Air Vice-Marshal Ian Sharrocks

No. 22 Group Royal Air Force (22 Gp) is one of five groups currently active in the Royal Air Force (RAF), falling under the responsibility of Deputy Commander-in-Chief (Personnel) in Air Command. Its previous title up until 2018 was No. 22 (Training) Group. The group is responsible for RAF training policy and controlling the Royal Air Force College and the RAF's training stations. As such, it is the direct successor to Training Group. 22 Group provides training to all three service branches of the British Armed Forces; namely the Royal Air Force, the Royal Navy, and the British Army.

== History ==
Although No. 22 Group was due to be formed on 1 April 1918, the same day as the Royal Air Force was established, it was not activated until 1 July 1918; 108 years ago, in the RAF's North Western Area. It was activated at RAF East Fortune, but moved its headquarters to the Station Hotel, Stirling. The next month, on 8 August 1918, it received the designation 'Operations', making its full title No. 22 (Operations) Group. It controlled No. 78 (Operations) Wing, and stations at East Fortune and Luce Bay. With the post First World War Royal Air Force force reductions, No. 22 Group was disbanded on 30 May 1919; 107 years ago.

The next creation of No. 22 Group came on 12 April 1926; 100 years ago, when the group was re-formed from No. 7 Group within Inland Area. The group's designation was No. 22 (Army Co-operation) Group, and its headquarters was at South Farnborough. On 17 February 1936, No. 22 Group was transferred from the control of Inland Area to that of the Air Defence of Great Britain. Later that same year, on 1 May, the group was raised to command status. However, only just over two months later, on 14 July, the newly created command was reduced back to group status, becoming part of Fighter Command on the day of Fighter Command's creation. In 1938, the group comprised 26 Squadron at RAF Catterick; RAF Hawkinge with 2 Squadron; RAF Odiham and No. 50 (Army Cooperation) Wing, with 4, 13, and 53 Squadrons; RAF Old Sarum with the School of Army Co-operation and 16 and No. 59 Squadron RAFs; and group headquarters and No. 1 Anti-Aircraft Cooperation Unit at South Farnborough.

On 24 June 1940, No. 22 Group was once again raised to command status and later that year, on 1 December, the new command was expanded to become RAF Army Cooperation Command.

On 1 August 1943, the group was re-established as No. 22 (Technical Training) Group in Technical Training Command out of 20 and 72 Groups, with its HQ at Buntingsdale Hall, Market Drayton. The group continued in its training function for nearly thirty years, until it was disbanded 31 January 1972.

=== Training Group Defence Agency ===
Training Group (TG) was formed on 1 April 1994 from the AOC Training Units with Personnel and Training Command its controlling formation. Prior to 1 April 2006 Training Group held British Government agency status, operating as the Training Group Defence Agency (TGDA). Upon the loss of its agency status, the formation became known simply as Training Group. The Group had seven areas of responsibility:

- RAF College Cranwell and Directorate of Recruiting
- Directorate of Flying Training (DFT)
- Directorate of Joint Technical Training (DJTT)
- Royal Air Force Air Cadets (RAFAC)
- Core HQ
- Defence College of Aeronautical Engineering (DCAE)
- Defence College of Communications and Information Systems (DCCIS)

=== Current creation ===
The current creation of No. 22 Group was established on 30 October 2006, once again as No. 22 (Training) Group. This creation was a renaming of Training Group which ceased to exist as No 22 Group was re-established.

22 Group is responsible for:

- Youth engagement across the UK;
- Recruiting, selection and basic training;
- Defence technical training – communications & engineering;
- UK Military Flying Training System;
- RAF Force Development, adventurous training, survival and specialist training;
- RAF-wide training assurance;
- Accreditation and resettlement;
- All RAF sport.

== Component units ==
As of November 2025, No. 22 Group comprises the following elements and units. Unless indicated otherwise, subordinate units are located at the same location as the unit they report to.

=== Directorate of Ground Training ===
The Directorate of Ground Training provides training and education policy, governance, assurance and support. It comprises the following elements:

- Adventure Training
- Air Power Education
- Force Development
- Training Policy and Plans

=== Directorate of Flying Training ===
The Directorate of Flying Training delivers provides trained military aircrew, air traffic controllers and flight operations personnel to meet front line requirements. Flying trying is provided by Ascent Flight Training though the UK Military Flying Training System. It comprises the following units:

- No.1 Flying Training School (RAF Shawbury)
  - 2 Maritime Air Wing
    - No. 202 Squadron (RAF Valley) – Airbus Jupiter HT1
    - No. 660 Squadron Army Air Corps – Airbus Juno HT1
    - 705 Naval Air Squadron – Airbus Juno HT1
  - 9 Regiment Army Air Corps
    - No. 60 Squadron – Airbus Juno HT1
    - No. 670 Squadron Army Air Corps – Airbus Juno HT1
- No. 3 Flying Training School (RAF Cranwell)
  - No. 16 Squadron – Grob Tutor T1
  - No. 45 Squadron – Embraer Phenom T1
  - No. 57 Squadron – Grob Prefect T1 (RAF Wittering)
  - No. 115 Squadron – Grob Tutor T1 (RAF Wittering)
- No. 4 Flying Training School (RAF Valley)
  - No. 4 Squadron – BAE Systems Hawk T2
  - No. 25 Squadron – BAE Systems Hawk T2
  - No. 72 Squadron – Beechcraft Texan T1
- Central Flying School (RAF Cranwell)
  - Central Flying School (Helicopters) (RAF Shawbury)
  - Smith Barry Academy
- Defence College of Air and Space Operations (RAF Shawbury)
  - School of Aerospace Battle Management
  - School of Air Operations Control

=== Directorate of RAF Sport ===
The Directorate of RAF Sport is based at RAF Halton and together with RAF sports associations supports the provision of sport to RAF personnel at an individual, unit, service and inter-service levels.

=== Defence College of Technical Training ===
he Defence College of Technical Training provides technical training and education to around 20,000 members of the RAF, Royal Navy and British Army per annum. Training is delivered through four Defence schools focussed upon specialisations of aeronautical engineering, electronic and mechanical engineering, marine engineering, and communications and information systems engineering. It comprises the following elements:

- Headquarters Defence College of Technical Training (MOD Lyneham)
  - Defence School of Aeronautical Engineering (RAF Cosford)
    - No. 1 School of Technical Training
    - No. 2 School of Technical Training
    - Royal Naval Air Engineering and Survival School (HMS Sultan)
    - School of Army Aeronautical Engineering (MOD Lyneham)
  - Defence School of Communications and Information Systems (Blandford Camp)
    - No.1 Radio School (RAF Cosford)
      - Aerial Erectors School (RAF Digby)
    - 11th (The Royal School of Signals) Signals Regiment
  - Defence School of Electronic and Mechanical Engineering (MOD Lyneham)
    - No. 4 School of Technical Training
    - 8 Training Battalion, Royal Electrical and Mechanical Engineers
    - Royal Electrical and Mechanical Engineers Arms School

=== Royal Air Force Air Cadets ===
The RAF Air Cadets is a youth organisation and the world's largest youth air training organisation, supported by thousands of volunteer staff. It comprises the following elements:

Headquarters RAF Cadets (RAF Cranwell)
  - Air Training Corps
  - Combined Cadet Force (RAF section)
  - No. 2 Flying Training School (RAF Syerston)
    - Central Gliding School – Grob Viking T1
    - No. 611 Volunteer Gliding Squadron – Grob Viking T1 (RAF Honington)
    - No. 615 Volunteer Gliding Squadron – Grob Viking T1 (Kenley Airfield)
    - No. 621 Volunteer Gliding Squadron – Grob Viking T1 (Little Rissington Airfield)
    - No. 622 Volunteer Gliding Squadron – Grob Viking T1 (Trenchard Lines)
    - No. 626 Volunteer Gliding Squadron – Grob Viking T1 (RNAS Predannack)
    - No. 632 Volunteer Gliding Squadron – Grob Viking T1 (Ternhill Airfield)
    - No. 637 Volunteer Gliding Squadron – Grob Viking T1 (Little Rissington Airfield)
    - No. 644 Volunteer Gliding Squadron – Grob Viking T1
    - No. 645 Volunteer Gliding Squadron – Grob Viking T1 (RAF Topcliffe)
    - No. 661 Volunteer Gliding Squadron – Grob Viking T1 (RAF Kirknewton)

=== Royal Air Force College ===
The Royal Air Force College, based at RAF Cranwell, provides recruit and officer training, and oversees University Air Squadrons.

- RAF College Cranwell
  - Aviator Training Academy (RAF Halton)
    - Aviator Command Squadron
    - Recruit Training Squadron
  - RAF Officer Training Academy
  - RAF Recruitment and Selection
  - Robson Academy of Resilience
    - Aircrew SERE Training Centre
    - Defence Aviation Human Factors Training School
    - Defence Fire Training Unit (Fire Service College, Moreton-in-Marsh)
    - Defence Survive, Evade, Resist, Extract Training Organisation (RAF St Mawgan)
    - Resilience Wing (RAF St Mawgan)
    - Stress Management and Resilience Wing (RAF Cranwell and RAF Halton)
  - Specialist Training School (RAF Halton)
  - Tedder Academy of Leadership
  - No. 6 Flying Training School (RAF Cranwell)
    - No. 1 Air Experience Flight – Grob Tutor T1 (MOD St Athan)
    - No. 2 Air Experience Flight – Grob Tutor T1 (MOD Boscombe Down)
    - No. 3 Air Experience Flight – Grob Tutor T1 (Colerne Airfield)
    - No. 4 Air Experience Flight – Grob Tutor T1 (Glasgow Airport)
    - No. 5 Air Experience Flight – Grob Tutor T1 (RAF Wittering)
    - No. 6 Air Experience Flight – Grob Tutor T1 (RAF Benson)
    - No. 7 Air Experience Flight – Grob Tutor T1
    - No. 8 Air Experience Flight – Grob Tutor T1 (RAF Cosford)
    - No. 9 Air Experience Flight – Grob Tutor T1 (RAF Leeming)
    - No. 10 Air Experience Flight – Grob Tutor T1 (RAF Woodvale)
    - No. 11 Air Experience Flight – Grob Tutor T1 (RAF Leeming)
    - No. 12 Air Experience Flight – Grob Tutor T1 (Leuchars Station)
    - No. 13 Air Experience Flight – Grob Tutor T1 (Aldergrove Flying Station)
    - Bristol University Air Squadron – Grob Tutor T1 (MOD Boscombe Down)
    - Cambridge University Air Squadron – Grob Tutor T1 (RAF Wittering)
    - East Midlands Universities Air Squadron – Grob Tutor T1 (RAF Cranwell)
    - East of Scotland Universities Air Squadron – Grob Tutor T1 (Leuchars Station)
    - Liverpool University Air Squadron – Grob Tutor T1 (RAF Woodvale)
    - Manchester and Salford Universities Air Squadron – Grob Tutor T1 (RAF Woodvale)
    - Northern Ireland Universities Air Squadron – Grob Tutor T1 (Aldergrove Flying Station)
    - Northumbrian Universities Air Squadron – Grob Tutor T1 (RAF Leeming)
    - Oxford University Air Squadron – Grob Tutor T1 (RAF Benson)
    - Southampton University Air Squadron – Grob Tutor T1 (MOD Boscombe Down)
    - University of Birmingham Air Squadron – Grob Tutor T1 (RAF Cosford)
    - Universities of Glasgow and Strathclyde Air Squadron – Grob Tutor T1 (Glasgow Airport)
    - University of London Air Squadron – Grob Tutor T1 (RAF Wittering)
    - Universities of Wales Air Squadron – Grob Tutor T1 (MOD St Athan)
    - Yorkshire Universities Air Squadron – Grob Tutor T1 (RAF Leeming)

=== Other elements ===
- RAF Central Training School (RAF Halton)
- International Defence Training (RAF High Wycombe)

== Commanders ==
As of November 2025, No. 22 Group is led by Air Vice-Marshal Ian Sharrocks, who is Chief of Staff Training RAF and Air Officer Commanding No. 22 Group. Sharrocks is responsible to his superior commander, the Air Member for Personnel, who is also deputy commander-in-chief personnel in Air Command.

=== 1918 to 1919 ===
- 1 July 1918 Colonel, later Brigadier General, Edward Masterman

=== 1926 to 1940 ===
- 12 April 1926 Air Commodore Duncan Pitcher
- 9 April 1929 Air Commodore Norman MacEwen
- 14 September 1931 Air Commodore H LeM Brock
- 30 June 1936 Air Commodore, later Air Vice-Marshal Bertine Sutton
- 3 July 1939 Air Vice-Marshal Charles Blount
- 15 September 1939 Air Vice-Marshal Norman MacEwen
- 30 May 1940 Air Vice-Marshal Charles Blount
- 23 October 1940 Not Known
- 20 November 1940 Air Marshal Sir Arthur Barratt

=== 1943 to 1972 ===
- 1 August 1943 Air Vice-Marshal C E V Porter
- 1946 to 1948 Air Vice-Marshal Alick Stevens
- 19 January 1948 Air Vice-Marshal P E Maitland
- 15 June 1950 Air Vice-Marshal Brian Reynolds
- 25 August 1952 Air Vice-Marshal Walter Merton
- 1 December 1953 Air Vice-Marshal James Fuller-Good
- 15 January 1957 Air Vice-Marshal Roy Faville
- 12 September 1960 Air Vice-Marshal Bernard Chacksfield
- 12 November 1962 Air Vice-Marshal A A Case
- 15 January 1966 Air Vice-Marshal Bill Crawford-Crompton
- 1 July 1968 Air Vice-Marshal G R Magill
- 1 January 1970 Air Vice-Marshal E Plumtree

=== 1992 to 2006 ===
- 1992 Air Vice-Marshal Christopher C. C. Coville
- 1994 Air Vice Marshal John A G May
- 8 January 1997 Air Vice-Marshal A. J. Stables
- 17 November 1999 Air Vice-Marshal I. S. Corbitt
- 4 April 2002 Air Vice-Marshal Graham A. Miller
- 2003 Air Vice-Marshal David A. Walker
- 4 January 2005 Air Vice-Marshal John M. M. Ponsonby

=== 2006 onwards ===
- 30 October 2006 Air Vice-Marshal John Ponsonby
- July 2007 Air Vice-Marshal Richard Garwood
- 17 April 2009 Air Vice-Marshal Barry North
- 23 February 2010 Air Vice-Marshal M C Green
- 2011 Air Vice-Marshal Michael Lloyd
- 18 July 2014 Air Vice-Marshal Andrew Turner
- July 2017 Air Vice-Marshall Warren James
- August 2020 Air Vice-Marshal Richard Maddison
- May 2023 Air Vice-Marshal Ian Townsend
- November 2025 Air Vice-Marshal Ian Sharrocks

== See also ==
- List of Royal Air Force groups
