= Herbert Durkin =

RAF commander

Sir Herbert Durkin
- Born: 31 March 1922; Burnley, Lancashire
- Died: 12 April 2004 (aged 82)
- Military career
- Allegiance: United Kingdom
- Branch: Royal Air Force
- Service years: 1941–1978
- Rank: Air Marshal
- Commands: No. 2 School of Technical Training; No. 90 (Signals) Group
- Conflicts: World War II
- Awards: Knight Commander of the Order of the British Empire; Companion of the Order of the Bath

Air Marshal Sir Herbert Durkin KBE CB (31 March 1922 – 12 April 2004) was an expert on signals and communications who joined the Royal Air Force during World War II, rising to become one of its senior commanders in the 1970s.

== Early and personal life ==
Sir Herbert was born and brought up in Burnley, Lancashire, attending Burnley Grammar School and then reading Mathematics at Emmanuel College, Cambridge. He married Dorothy Hope Johnson in 1951, they had a son and two daughters.

== RAF career ==
In 1940 during World War II and while still an undergraduate, Sir Herbert was recruited by C P Snow to work on the newly established Chain Home radar system and he was later commissioned into the technical branch of the RAF Volunteer Reserve on 24 October 1941. He also became involved in the calibration of the Oboe blind bombing system and GEE navigation system. Towards the end of the war, he moved to India to establish a GEE network there, before serving as aide-de-camp to Air Marshal Sir Hugh Walmsley, then Air Officer Commander-in-Chief, RAF India.

Appointed to a Permanent Commission in the rank of Flight Lieutenant on 16 September 1948, he worked at the Central Bomber Establishment until 1950. Then while based at the Atomic Weapons Research Establishment at Fort Halstead, he prepared the electrical systems for Operation Hurricane, the first test of a British atomic bomb.

After attending RAF Staff College in 1953, a year-long posting as Command Signals Officer, AHQ Iraq followed. From 1955–58 he was Chief Instructor of the Signals Division at the RAF Technical College, before spending four years at the Deputy Directorate of Technical Services. He was Assistant Chief of Staff (Communications-Electronics) at the Second Allied Tactical Air Force HQ in Germany from 1962 and then Commandant at the No. 2 School of Technical Training, RAF Cosford 1965–67.

In 1967 Sir Herbert became Director of Engineering Policy (RAF) at the Ministry of Defence, then he was appointed Air Officer Commanding No. 90 (Signals) Group in 1971. In 1973 he returned to the MoD to become Director General of Engineering and Supply Management (RAF), before assuming his most senior appointment, Controller of Engineering and Supply (RAF) as Air Marshal in 1976. He retired from the RAF on 3 June 1978.

Sir Herbert then took a post as technical adviser to the managing director of Plessey Telecoms, also sitting as a non-executive director on the board of a number of companies. He was President of the Institution of Electrical Engineers (IEE) from 1980–1, the first Air Marshal to do so.
