= Stewart Menaul =

Royal Air Force officer (1915–1987)

- Air Vice Marshal Stewart Menaul in the 1960s
- Born: 17 June 1915
- Died: 22 May 1987 (aged 71)
- Military career
- Allegiance: United Kingdom
- Branch: Royal Air Force
- Service years: 1931–1968
- Rank: Air Vice Marshal
- Nickname: Paddy
- Commands: Joint Services Staff College (1965–68); RAF Lindholme (1957–59); RAF Upwood (1944–46); RAF Graveley (1943–44); RAF Gransden Lodge (1943); No. 15 Squadron RAF (1942–43)
- Conflicts: Second World War: Bombing of Germany
- Awards: Companion of the Order of the Bath; Commander of the Order of the British Empire; Distinguished Flying Cross; Air Force Cross; Mentioned in Despatches (5)

Air Vice Marshal Stewart William Blacker Menaul, CB, CBE, DFC, AFC (17 June 1915 – 22 May 1987) was an officer in the Royal Air Force (RAF). During the Second World War he served in RAF Bomber Command with the elite Pathfinder Force. After the war he participated in the British nuclear weapons tests in Australia, and was on board the Vickers Valiant that dropped Britain's first atomic bomb on 11 October 1956 during Operation Buffalo.

== Early life and career ==
Stewart William Blacker Menaul was born on 17 June 1915. He was educated in Laurelvale and Portadown, in County Armagh, Northern Ireland. He joined the Royal Air Force (RAF) in 1931 as an apprentice with No. 2 School of Technical Training at RAF Cranwell. In 1935 he commenced flight training with C Squadron at the Royal Air Force College Cranwell, and on completion of his training, was commissioned as a pilot officer on 19 December 1936.

== Second World War ==
Menaul was posted to No. 21 Squadron RAF, which was then flying the Hawker Hind biplane. He was promoted to flying officer on 19 June 1938, and was granted the acting rank of flight lieutenant on 7 April 1939. He relinquished the rank on 11 May 1939, but was restored to it on 19 June 1940. In 1940 and 1941 he was a flight instructor. He was mentioned in despatches on 1 January 1941.

Menaul's next assignment was to No. 15 Squadron RAF, a bomber squadron flying the Vickers Wellington and later the Short Stirling. He was awarded the Distinguished Flying Cross on 22 August 1941. Promoted to squadron leader on 1 September 1941, he became the squadron commander on 7 January 1942. He was awarded the Air Force Cross on 1 January 1943, and was again mentioned in despatches on 1 January 1943 and 1 June 1943.

In May 1943, with his combat tour completed, Menaul was assigned to the staff of No. 3 Group RAF. He became acting wing commander on 1 July 1943; the rank became substantive on 7 November. He became the commander of RAF Gransden Lodge on 5 June 1943, RAF Graveley on 23 August 1943, and RAF Upwood on 6 December 1944. He was again mentioned in despatches on 1 January 1945 and 1 January 1946.

== Post war ==
After the war, Menaul attended the RAF Staff College, Bracknell, and joined the staff of the RAF Directorate of Organisation (Forecasting and Planning). He attended the Imperial Defence College in 1950, and then became Deputy Director of Operations. He was promoted to group captain on 1 January 1953.

In 1955, Menaul attended US nuclear tests at the Nevada Test Site, and then became the air task group commander for the British nuclear weapons tests in Australia. He flew an English Electric Canberra bomber through the fallout cloud during Operation Mosaic to measure radiation levels, and was on board the Vickers Valiant that dropped Britain's first atomic bomb on 11 October 1956 during Operation Buffalo. He was appointed a Commander of the Order of the British Empire in the 1957 New Year Honours.

Menaul returned to England in 1957, and became the commander of the Bomber Command Bombing School at RAF Lindholme. In April 1959, he became the Air Officer-in-Charge Administration for the British Forces in the Arabian Peninsula. He was promoted to air commodore on 1 July 1959, and air vice-marshal on 3 May 1961. He became Senior Air Staff Officer at Bomber Command on 27 April 1961, and was made a Companion of the Order of the Bath in the 1963 Birthday Honours. His final posting, on 5 July 1965, was as commandant of the Joint Services Staff College. He retired on 29 April 1968.

== Later life ==
After leaving the RAF, "Paddy" Menaul (as he was known), became Director General of the Royal United Services Institute (RUSI). Under his guidance, it transformed from a society of military men with a respected journal into a well-known voice in public policy matters. He retired on 13 August 1976, and became a defence consultant. He achieved widespread public recognition as an Independent Television commentator on the 1982 Falklands War.

Menaul died on 22 May 1987. After his death, documents relating to Menaul from 1950 to 1986 have been compiled in 1997 and stored in King's College London.
