= No. 2 School of Technical Training RAF =

Ground-based training school of the Royal Air Force

- School badge
- Active: 1920–1932; 1938–1994; 2023–present
- Country: United Kingdom
- Branch: Royal Air Force
- Type: Defence training school
- Role: Aircraft engineering training
- Part of: Defence School of Aeronautical Engineering
- Station: RAF Cosford
- Motto: Scientia pons perpetuus est (Latin for 'Knowledge is a lasting bridge')

No. 2 School of Technical Training RAF (also known as No. 2 S of TT) is a current training unit within the Royal Air Force. The school formed at Cranwell in 1920, and was later disbanded before being reformed at a new base, RAF Cosford, in 1938. It was closed in 1994, but in July 2023, it was reactivated as part of the training environment at RAF Cosford.

== History ==
No. 2 School of Technical Training was formed in April 1920 from the Boys Training Wing of the Aircraft Apprentice Scheme at RAF Cranwell, whilst the school at RAF Halton was named as No. 1 School of Technical Training; the original plan had been to amalgamate the schools when accommodation at RAF Halton camp had been built for those from Cranwell. It stayed at Cranwell until the early 1930s, being disbanded there.

The school was reformed at RAF Cosford in July 1938, and all of its equipment was moved from RAF Halton camp by at least three special trains which were loaded at Wendover railway station and transported to RAF Cosford station. The school was housed in a purpose-built structure at Cosford called Fulton Block, which could accommodate 1,000 trainees. This building is still at RAF Cosford and is now grade II listed. Blackout paint was so effectively applied to the glass windows of Fulton Block, that by November 1945, by which time the Second World War had ended, the matter of the wasted electricity and the effect on the eyesight of those working there was raised as a matter of concern in the UK Parliament. Throughout the Second World War, the school trained over 70,000 adult personnel in the engine, airframe and armament trades. During the 1940s and 1950s, the school was part of RAF Technical Training Command. The last boys entrant course passed out of the school in 1965, by which time over 13,000 personnel had been trained since the end of the Second World War; thereafter the school focussed on technical training of men. Besides the aircraft associated roles that technical schools in the RAF trained boys upon, the school also provided training for the radio, photographic and nursing trades.

Some of the former No. 2 S of TT hangars on the airfield site at Cosford became the home of the RAF Museum site at the base. By the 1980s, with the focus on the avionics, radar, and flight systems training, the school had become the largest ground training environment within the RAF. The school was disbanded on 24 November 1994, when it merged into No. 1 School of Technical Training at RAF Halton.

The school was reformed in July 2023, by renaming the Aerosystems Engineer and Management Training School at RAF Cosford during the same parade that saw the 85th anniversary of the RAF Cosford base. The Line Training Flight (LTF) section of the school was rebadged as No. 238 Squadron in 2007. The other units within the school are:

- Engineer Management Training Flight
- Weapons and Survival Equipment Training Flight
- Academic Principles Organisation

== Heritage ==
The school's badge was awarded by Queen Elizabeth II in 1987 and shows a torch behind the Iron Bridge of Ironbridge; Ironbridge being near RAF Cosford. The torch symbolises the teaching from the unit, and the bridge alludes to the link between the as yet unskilled, and the soon to be skilled technician. The badge was formally laid down into the tiled floor of St Clements Dane Church in London in August 1988.

The schools motto is Scientia pons perpetuus est (Latin for 'Knowledge is a lasting bridge').

== Notable personnel ==
- Herbert Durkin was commandant of the school from 1965 to 1967
- Ron Hayward, later a Labour Party activist
- Stewart Menaul, was a student at the school in 1931
- Group captain Neville Ramsbottom-Isherwood commanded the school in the late 1940s
- Frank Whittle trained at the school
