= Defence School of Aeronautical Engineering =

- School logo
- Active: 1 April 2004 – present
- Country: United Kingdom
- Branch: Royal Air Force; British Army; Royal Navy
- Type: Defence training establishment
- Role: Aeronautical engineering training
- Part of: Defence College of Technical Training
- Locations: RAF Cosford (Headquarters); RAF Cranwell; HMS Sultan; MOD Lyneham

The Defence School of Aeronautical Engineering (DSAE) is a Defence Training Establishment (DTEs) of the British Ministry of Defence. It was formed on 1 April 2004 and provides training for aircraft engineering officers and tradesmen across the three British armed forces. The school comprises a headquarters, No. 1 School of Technical Training and the Aerosystems Engineer and Management Training School (now No. 2 School of Technical Training), all based at RAF Cosford, the Royal Naval Air Engineering and Survival Equipment School (RNAESS) at HMS Sultan, with elements also based at RAF Cranwell and MOD Lyneham (School of Army Aeronautical Engineering).

== History ==
Crest of the DCAE

The school was formed on 1 April 2004 as the Defence College of Aeronautical Engineering (DCAE) and was one of five federated defence colleges formed after the Defence Training Review. In 2012, it joined three other technical training colleges under a combined organisation, the Defence College of Technical Training, and reverted in title to being a Defence School.

On 17 January 2007, Secretary of State for Defence Des Browne announced that Metrix UK, a joint venture between Qinetiq and Land Securities, had been selected as preferred bidder for Package One of Defence training. This would locate all Aeronautical Engineering training for all three services at MOD St Athan in 2017. The project was terminated in 2010 as part of the Strategic Defence and Security Review, undertaken by the Conservative-Liberal Democrat coalition government.

== Constituent elements ==
The school comprises a headquarters and four affiliated schools.

=== Headquarters ===
The DSAE headquarters is based at the RAF Cosford in Shropshire. The school reports to the Defence College of Technical Training (DCTT) which, in turn, is part of the Royal Air Force's No. 22 Group. Between 2004 and 2009 the station at Cosford was known as DCAE Cosford.

=== No. 1 School of Technical Training ===
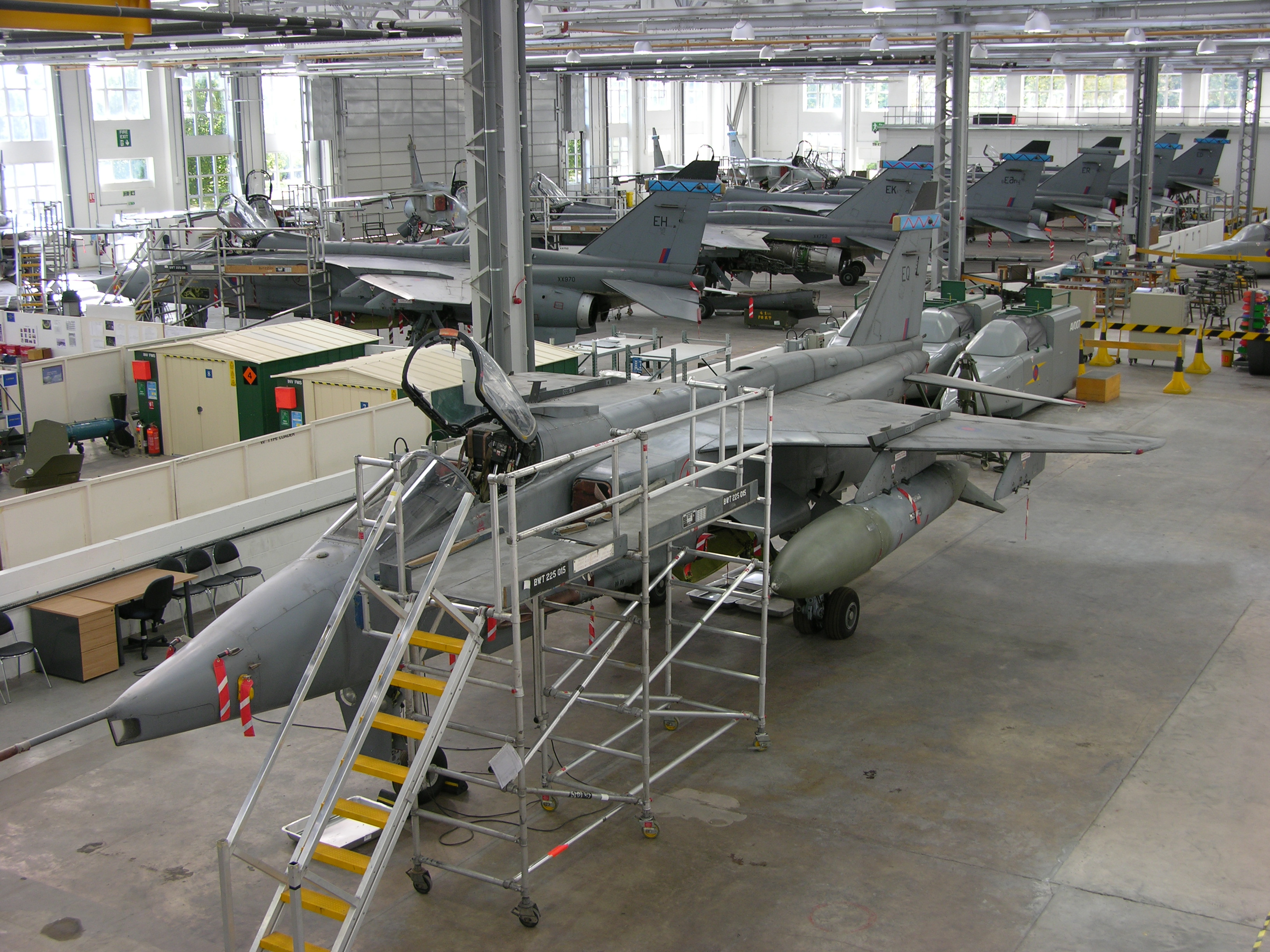
Several SEPECAT Jaguar GR3A used as instructional airframes at No. 1 School of Technical Training at RAF Cosford.

The RAF's No. 1 School of Technical Training is based at RAF Cosford and provides RAF personnel with mechanical, avionics, weapons and survival equipment training. The school trains around 2,000 students per year.

=== No. 2 School of Technical Training ===
Professional and management training is provided to RAF personnel by the Aerosystems Engineer and Management Training School (AE&MTS) based at RAF Cosford.

=== Royal Naval Air Engineering and Survival Equipment School ===
Based at HMS Sultan located at Gosport in Hampshire, the Royal Navy's Air Engineering and Survival Equipment School provides aeronautical engineering and survival equipment training to Royal Navy personnel. The school is divided into six elements – a headquarters, 764 Initial Training Squadron, the Advanced Training Group, the Common Training Group, the Specialist Training Group and the Training Support Group.

=== School of Army Aeronautical Engineering ===
Based at MOD Lyneham in Wiltshire, the Army's aviation engineering school delivers aeronautical engineering training to British Army personnel in the Royal Electrical and Mechanical Engineers (REME). SAAE trains potential aeronautical Technicians, Supervisor, Artificers and Engineering Officers for frontline Joint Helicopter Command roles in order to sustain REME Aviation.
