= Aerial reconnaissance in World War I =

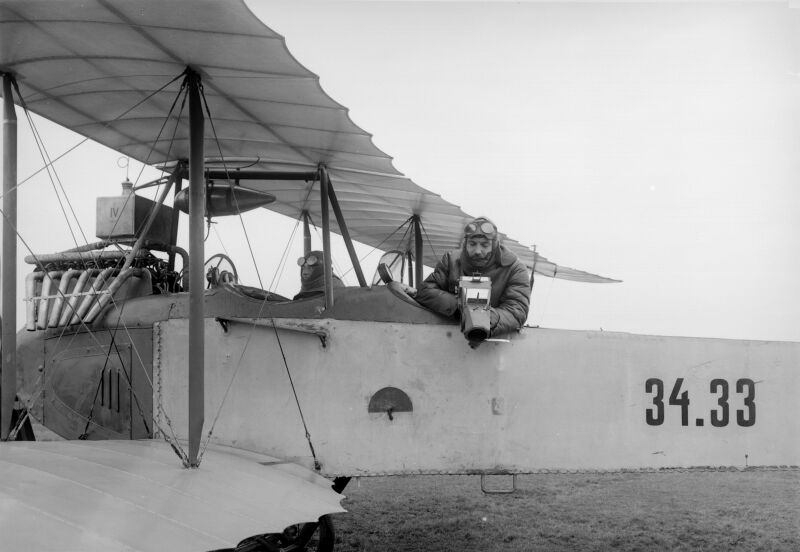
Aviator on ground showing how pictures were taken.

Aerial reconnaissance using heavier-than-air machines was an entirely new science that had to be improvised step-by-step. Early operations were low-level flights with the pilot often dismounting from the plane to report verbally to the nearest officers. Photographic support was urgently developed, initially requiring a full-time photographer on board to handle the heavy, awkward equipment. The interpreting of aerial images was an important new speciality, essential for accurate mapping. By 1915, air-to-ground radio was in use for reconnaissance pilots.

The leader in aeronautics at the outset was France, with its Blériot observation planes, while Germany was more advanced in optics. The British were somewhat behind in the early stages, owing to lack of government backing. America would make valuable contributions in the form of multi-lens cameras for precision spotting.

Reconnaissance remained an under-rated military art, compared with aerial combat, which gained the publicity, but impacted less on the outcome of the war.

== Beginnings ==
The first use of an airplane in war was a reconnaissance flight performed on 23 October 1911 by Captain Carlo Maria Piazza in a Blériot XI during the Italo-Turkish War in Tripolitania. Military aerial photography began that December. The experience in World War I would begin on very similar terms, with French Bleriot and German Taube monoplanes. Reconnaissance was widely perceived as the only practical use of airplanes.

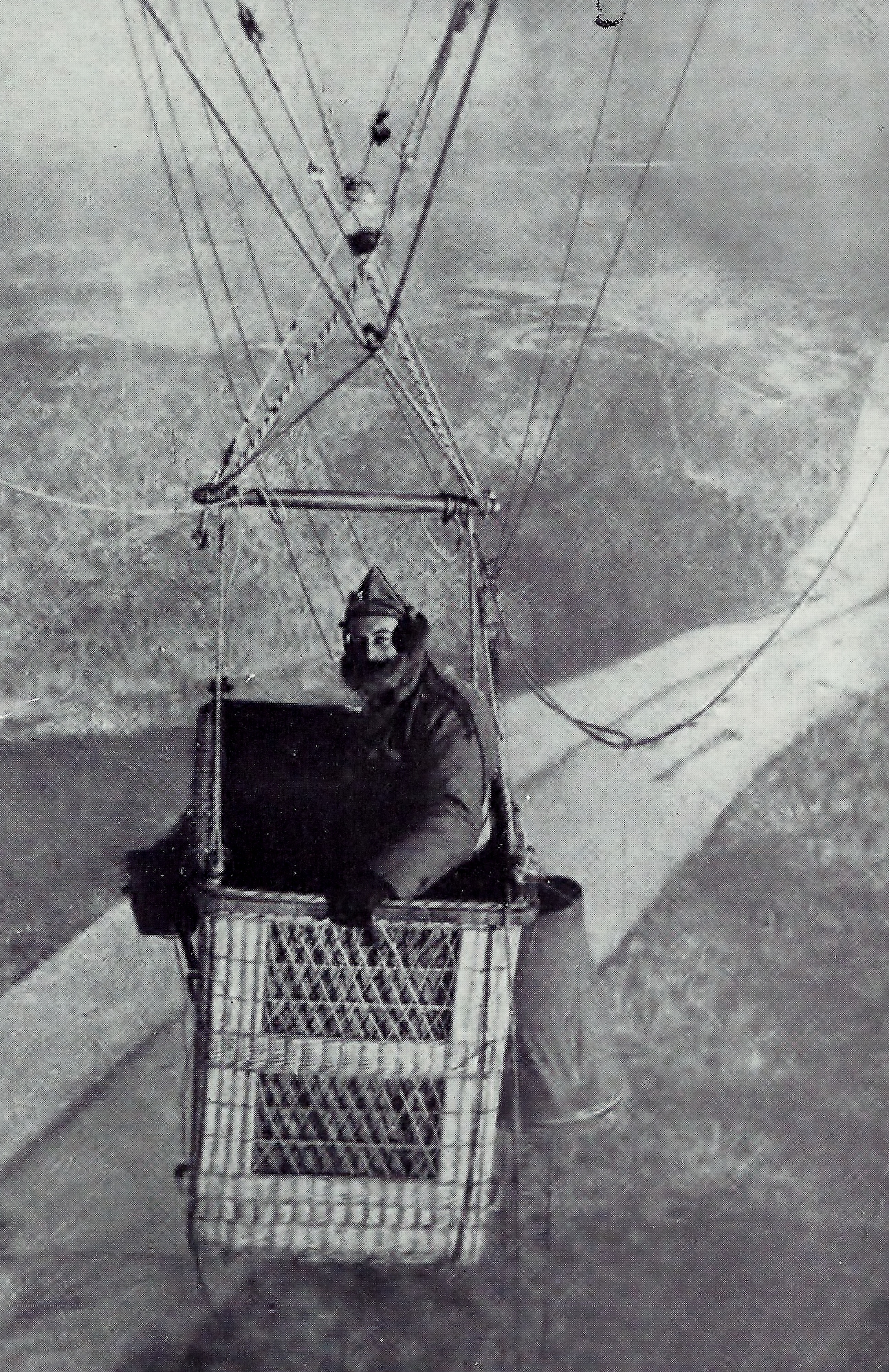
A French balloon observer, 1918

While most of the combatant countries possessed a few military aircraft in August 1914, these were almost exclusively devoted to reconnaissance and artillery spotting, supplementing well-tried and familiar platforms like balloons and kites. Tethered balloons could ascend to as high as a mile, but were easy to shoot down. Furthermore, they were unstable observation platforms in any wind, leading to attempts to stabilize them with kite-tails or drogues attached to the basket. Dirigibles like the huge new German Zeppelins were considered the best reconnaissance platforms and they served effectively for maritime patrols. Vertical camera installations were used from the beginning of the war, but they were too heavy and bulky for light airplanes, and most early reconnaissance from airplanes consisted of visual observation and written reports. Handheld cameras were widely used but with disappointing results. Good photographs required both skilled flying and an operator who could devote time to handle the camera and the unwieldy and heavy glass plates it required. In time, longer focal length lenses were used, cameras and gear grew lighter and bigger, and for survival, operating altitudes increased up to 12,000–18,000 feet (3,700–5,500 m). Driven high, aircrews began to use oxygen and heated clothing items.

The critical discipline of communicating results led to rampant improvisation. At first it was not uncommon for aircraft to land next to command posts so the pilot could personally pass on urgent information. For artillery spotting, time was of the essence, and the French tried air-dropped messaging, colored flares, and pre-arranged aircraft maneuvers to convey information. France was reportedly the first to try airborne radios, often transmitters alone due to the weight penalty; others maintain that Britain preceded with the light-weight Sterling radio set in aircraft by 1915, and yet others claim that the pioneers were Austrians with their shelling of Tarnów railway station with a 420 mm howitzer in January 1915.

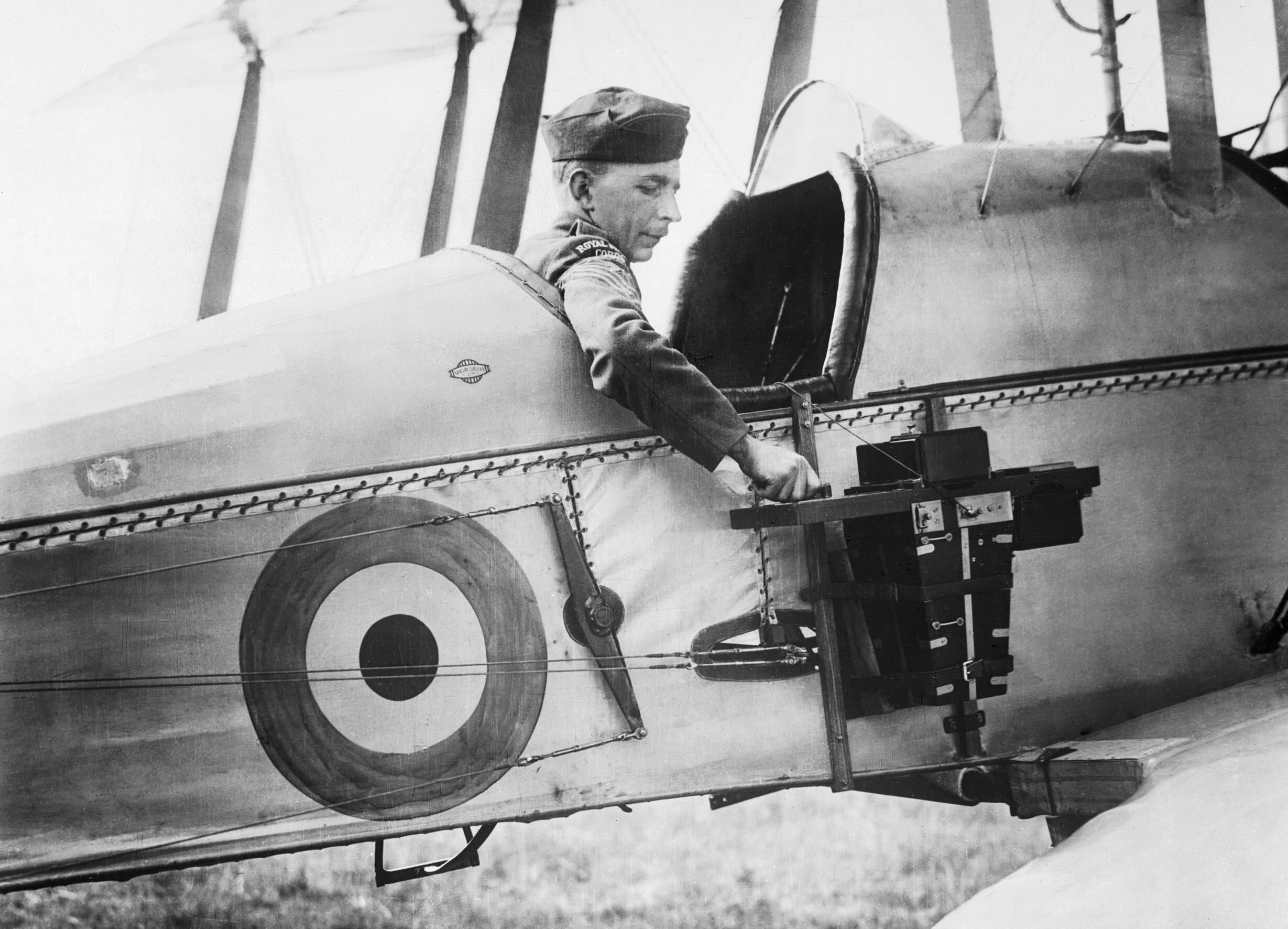
An aerial reconnaissance camera of 1916 as operated by the pilot of a B.E.2c

Germany had a scientific lead and adopted the first aerial camera, a Görz, in 1913. Austria-Hungary followed their lead. Just two weeks into the war, reporters noted of airplanes: "They have ranged constantly over the enemy's positions, so that the French have always known what the Germans have been doing. This has so disconcerted the latter that they are now making efforts to frighten the French air scouts away." By 17 August 1914 and repeatedly thereafter, Belgian "air scouts" reported on German troop movements.

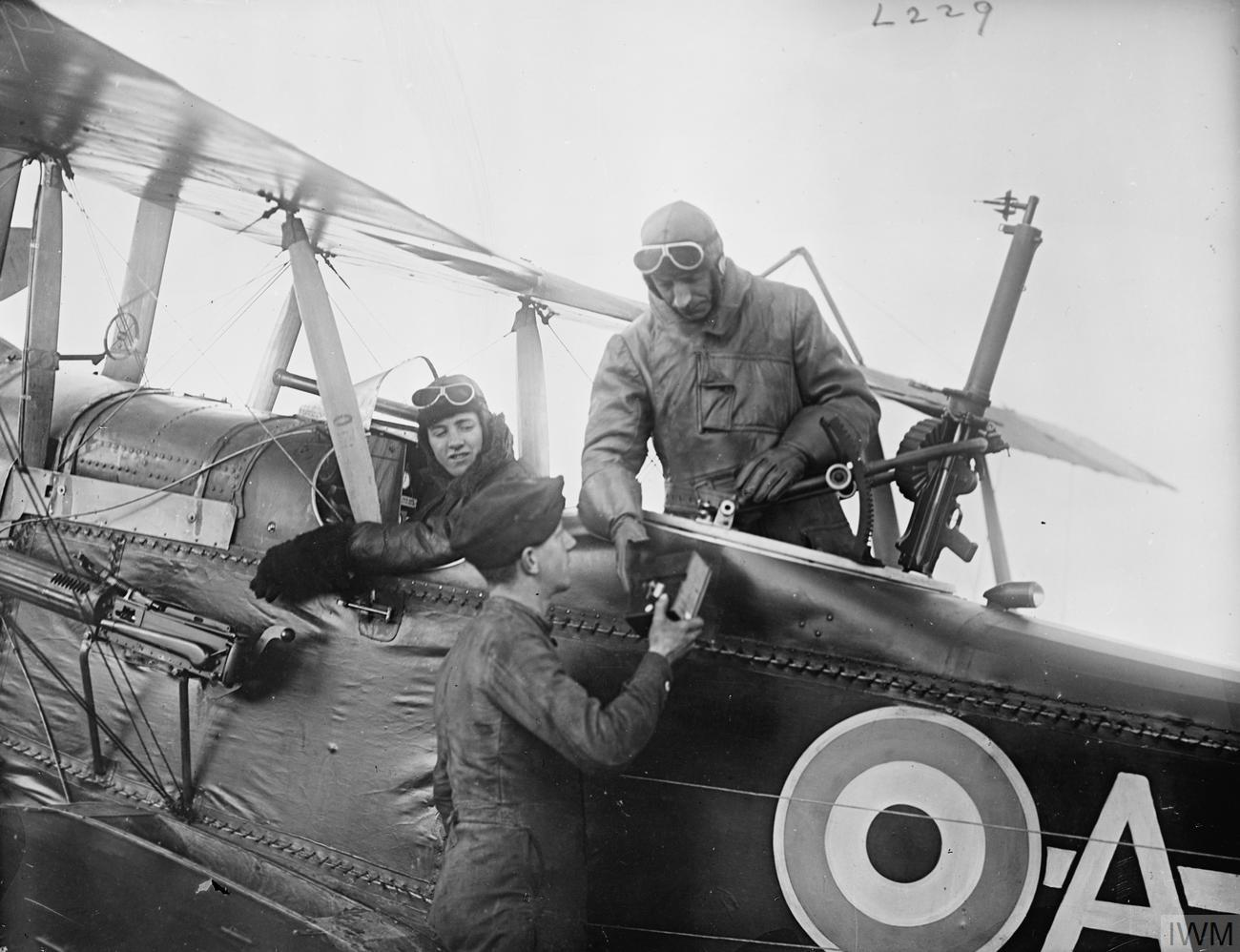
An air mechanic handing photographic plates to an observer in a Royal Aircraft Factory R.E.8 near Arras, 22 February 1918.

France was by far the aeronautical leader at the time, and the French Army had incorporated cameras in airplanes from the beginning. France began the war with several squadrons of Blériot observation planes. The French Army developed procedures for getting prints into the hands of field commanders quickly. In Britain, then lagging far behind in aviation, the reconnaissance pioneer F.C.V. Laws established the first heavier-than-air photography unit at Farnborough in 1913, using a Farman fitted with a Watson camera. In stark contrast with the French, early British reconnaissance was essentially conducted on an amateur basis, lacking in official backing.

The United States played an important role in the last months of the war, using French aircraft and modified cameras. Some techniques and equipment used in civilian surveying and mapping were developed by the US Army Corps of Engineers when the topographic engineer, James W. Bagley, transferred from the US Geological Survey to the army. Major Bagley brought his recently invented tri-lens camera to France, where it was used to make one vertical and two oblique images from airplanes. These images were used to overprint enemy trenches and gun emplacements over existing maps for precision targeting. An example of this camera is held at the Smithsonian Institution: "This object is on display in the Boeing Aviation Hangar at the Steven F. Udvar-Hazy Center in Chantilly, VA. Fairchild Aerial Camera Corporation built the production model of the T-2 and T-2A four-lens camera, which improved upon the T-1 tri-lens mapping camera developed by Maj. James Bagley of the U.S. Army Signal Corps. The T-2A had one vertical lens and three oblique lenses set at 35 degrees, which provided a 120-degree field of view at right angles to the direction of flight. Four lens caps are also displayed."

Italy and Russia had prominent roles as well, with Italy deploying some of the best performing aircraft. The small Ottoman air forces were mostly an extension of German air power. The failure of the Schlieffen Plan offensive in 1914 is attributed in part to French air superiority blinding German reconnaissance, but the German victory at Tannenberg is thought to have been helped by prompt response to air intelligence about Russian movements.

Despite the improvised start, all sides quickly learned the importance of aerial photography, and by 1916 heavier-than-air reconnaissance was a regular practice along the front. This in turn necessitated fighter escorts, and thus drove much of the rapid aeronautical progress of the four years of war. Support of ground forces was almost the sole role of reconnaissance; strategic air war concepts were as yet embryonic. At sea, lighter-than-air photography still dominated; but Zeppelins turned out to be very vulnerable over settled areas. Flying boats and seaplanes ("Hydro-aeroplanes") came into their own for coastal patrol duties. By the end of the war both sides maintained detailed maps of the front derived from mosaics of aerial photographs. Germany alone reportedly generated 4,000 images a day in 1918.

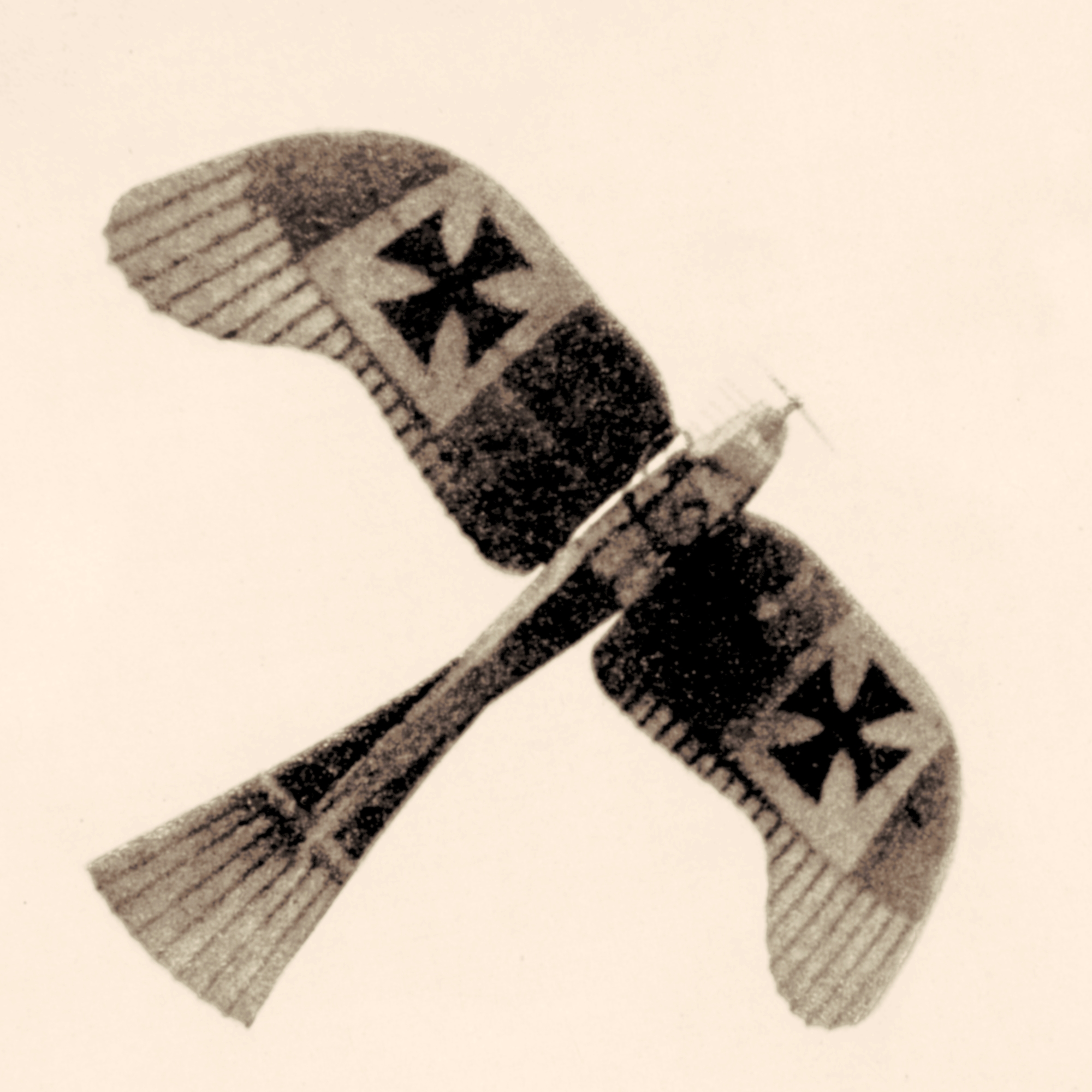
A German observation plane (Rumpler Taube) flies over. Nat. Geog. Jan.18

== Equipment ==
All major combatants maintained traditional units of kite-balloons and airships for point surveillance and reconnaissance. These were vulnerable, and tethered balloon observers were the first to use parachutes. Lighter-than-air platforms would soon be eclipsed, though not replaced, by fixed-wing aircraft.

At the beginning, France had a significant corps of Blériot type observation aircraft, soon replaced by a profusion of more capable types. The Royal Flying Corps entered the war with the slow but stable and reliable B.E.2 reconnaissance aircraft. It served acceptably in the role until new German fighters drove it from the skies in 1915–16. B.E.2 variants typically mounted a vertical camera outside the pilot's (rear) cockpit. The more capable but similar R.E.8 replaced the B.E.2c as the standard RAF reconnaissance aircraft and remained in that role despite requiring escort for survival. British aircraft used the Watson Air Camera, the Type A camera, and later the C, E, L and finally L/B cameras (L for Laws and B for Brabazon) developed specifically for aircraft. The early C-type used the available 12-inch (30 cm) lenses and a 4-by-5-inch (10 cm × 13 cm) plate. The Allies began to standardize on 18×24 cm plates and 25, 50 and 120 cm focal lengths, 50 being the most common.

The Central Powers used many different aircraft but especially Rumpler and Albatros types mounting Görz and ICA cameras. The Germans used also a standard 70 cm focal length and 13×18 cm plates. The radio-equipped unarmed photoship Rumpler C.VII (Rubild) — for Rumpler-Bildflugzeug (picture-aircraft) — distinguished itself for long-range and high-altitude, reaching 21,000 feet. Unusual recon aircraft included the armored Junkers J.I for low-level flights, the gigantic long-range Ilya Muromets from Russia, and the high-performing (at well over 200 km/h top speed) Italian Ansaldo SVA, considered nearly uninterceptable. Italy standardized on the simple 24-plate Lamperti camera.

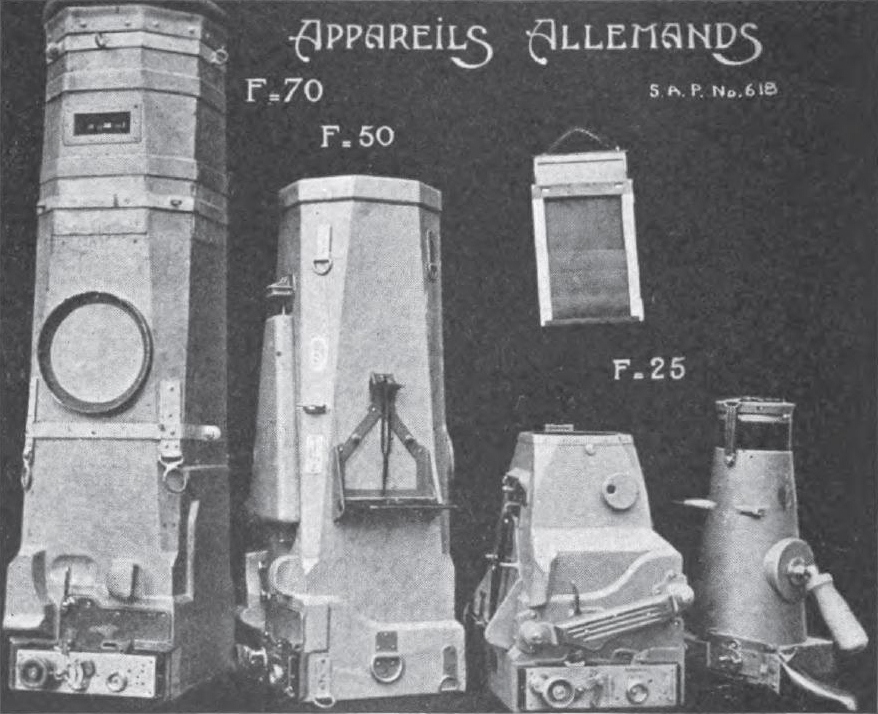
Captured German aerial cameras, France 1918. Ives/1920

German optics was overwhelmingly superior, as exemplified by Carl Zeiss lenses and optical glass. The Allies had to quickly learn to make lenses especially for long foci. In the meantime they had to make do with such short-focus lenses as could be found. When the U.S. entered the war, the Army urgently requested that American civilians turn in their lenses and optics, including telescopes and binoculars, for aerial use, specifically naming several sought-after German manufactures. Cameras quickly became large and mechanically very complex. German and Italian cameras generally used 13×18 cm plates. France standardized on the advanced deMaria cameras of various configurations. For the last two years of the war, Britain used almost exclusively the 35-pound (16 kg), semi-automatic, prop-driven L camera.

As was the case for airplanes, the U.S. made use of French and British cameras. As an example, the semi-automatic American deRam (from the French) weighed 45 kg, had a focal length of 50 cm (standard), and took 18×24 cm plates. The U.S. flew Curtiss Jennys with Folmer-Schwing (Graflex) handheld cameras during the Mexican excursion in 1916. These became the K-1, first in a long line of U.S. aerial cameras. The attempts at Allied interoperability was thus described at the time: “The task of harmonizing the photographic practice as taught in America, following English lines, with French practice as followed in the theater of war, and of adapting planes built on English designs so that they could carry French apparatus, was a formidable one, not likely to be soon forgotten by any who had a part in it.”

Overlapping stereoscopic photos began to be taken, requiring carefully timed exposures. Fully automatic cameras and film cameras came into use. Germany began using electrically heated cameras and devised engine-driven generator power. Wind-driven generators, both venturis and small props, came into use for automation. Suction was used to keep film flat on the plate. Despite the weight penalty, radiotelegraphy gradually replaced earlier “message-in-a-bottle” airdrops. Simple codes for artillery spotting were worked out. Despite some experiments, night photography was unsuccessful due to insufficient flash power and film speed, and inability to precisely time the exposure to the illumination.

At the end of the war, aerial photography was an enormous ongoing project. The number of exposed images numbered in the millions, with many more prints. Large photo-mosaics covering the entire Western Front at scales as low as 1:8000 were created and continuously updated. It is estimated that about one third of sorties were devoted to reconnaissance.

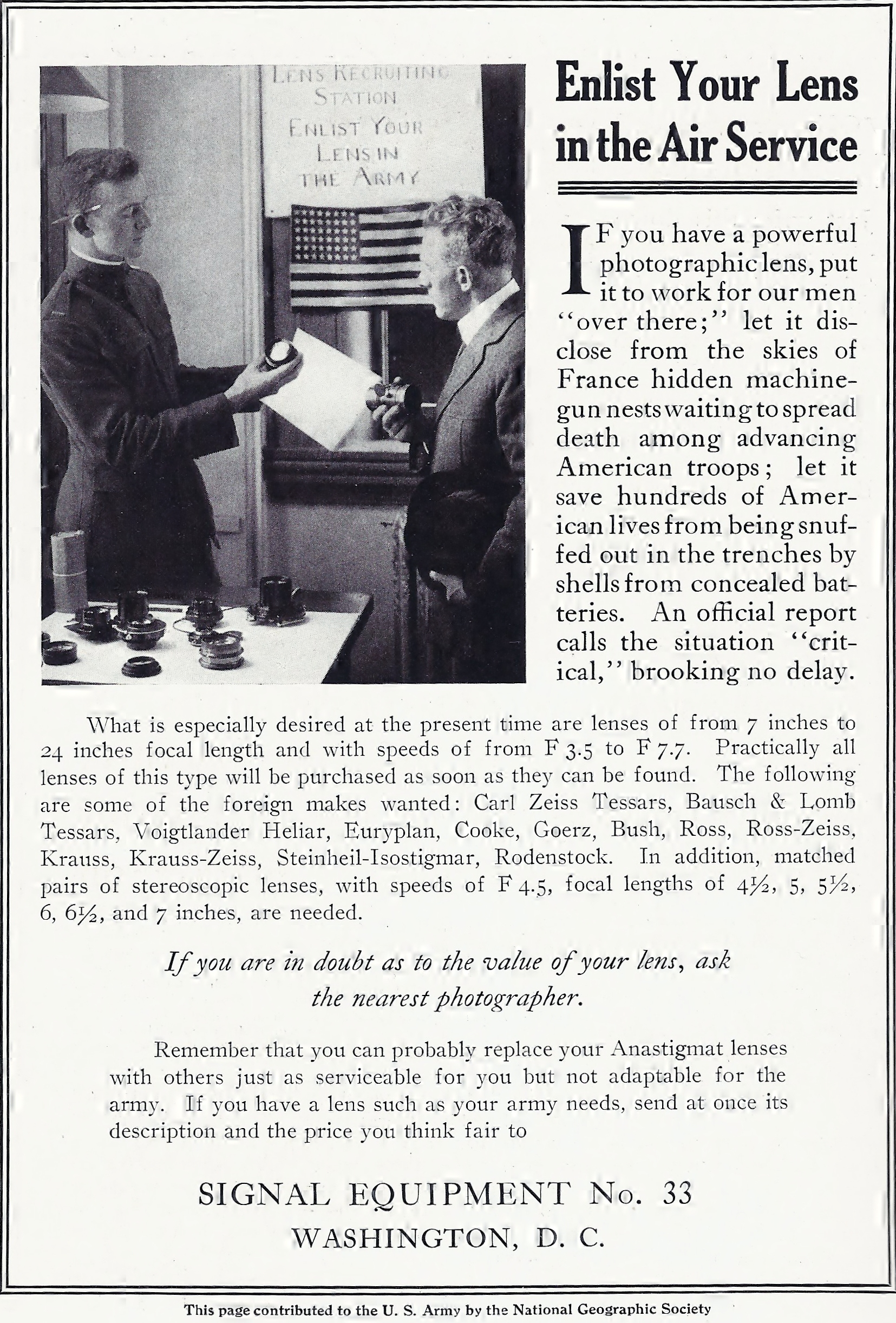
Urgent request for civilian optical gear: note nearly all lenses sought are of German manufacture. U.S.Army/Nat. Geogr./Jan. 1918

== Results ==
From an essentially zero base, armies had to create and train interpretation units, since the aerial view and stereoscopic view was quite alien to what ground-based reconnaissance would see. Interpreters had to have extensive knowledge of military hardware. They had to learn how to use shadows for size estimation, and to detect the increasing use of camouflage and decoys. Equally importantly, interpreters learned to standardize annotations and present comprehensive marked-up imagery to commanders. The static fronts and fixed fortifications in Europe were especially suitable for turning the art of interpretation into a science, while the far-ranging operations in the desert and at sea put a great premium on serendipitous discovery and resourcefulness.

Maritime reconnaissance tended to generate its own separate technology and procedures, aided by the customary sharp separation of the fleet from the armies. In the air, however, the two services overlapped, which began to cause friction in assigning responsibilities, especially for sea powers like the U.K. and the U.S. The use of ship-based observation aircraft (though not true carriers) was already well advanced by the end of the war. This quickly became a force multiplier for the fleet. It complicated offensive sea power; for example, Zeppelin surveillance of the North Sea made it difficult for the Royal Navy to exploit its naval superiority.

In four years, commanders learned that reconnaissance innately favors the defensive, as it reduces surprises and makes it difficult for the opponent to mass forces for attack. Inability to conduct reconnaissance, such as due to weather or enemy air domination, conversely leaves one highly vulnerable, as occurred repeatedly during the War. Commanders learned that in aircraft, there is no substitute for performance, and in cameras, no substitute for focal length. They learned to regularly monitor the opponent in order to detect any changes; and they learned the absolute necessity of maintaining libraries and institutional knowledge of targets and of the visual “signatures” of not only equipment, but the subtle effects thereof – tracks, marks, etc. – on the environment. Experts agree that most of this had to be relearned the hard way two decades later.

Perennial problems included the shortage of trained and experienced photo-interpreters, the difficulty in distributing timely and interpreted prints to exactly the commanders needing them, a lack of overall coordination of effort and centralized interpretation (a common air picture), and the tendency of field commanders to demand risky, repeated flights for objectives only for the photos to languish in files somewhere along the process.

Finally, the recurrent pattern of reconnaissance not gaining recognition commensurate with its importance developed during these years. There were no “reconnaissance aces” and recon pilots were not household names. Air combat gained immense publicity, but – apart from reconnaissance – air operations had negligible military effect. This imbalance in perception would have consequences for preparedness in later years.

== Bibliography ==
- Finnegan, Terrence: Shooting the Front: Allied Aerial Reconnaissance and Photographic Interpretation on the Western Front, World War I. Nat. Def. Intel. College, D.C., 2007
- Ives, Herbert Eugene. Airplane Photography. Lippincott, 1920.
- Ferdinando Pedriali, Aerei italiani in Libia (1911–1912), Storia Militare N° 170/novembre 2007 pag 31–40
- Goddard, George. Overview, 1963/
- National Geographic, January 1918, special issue on the air war.
