= Ian Sharrocks =

Officer of the British Royal Air Force

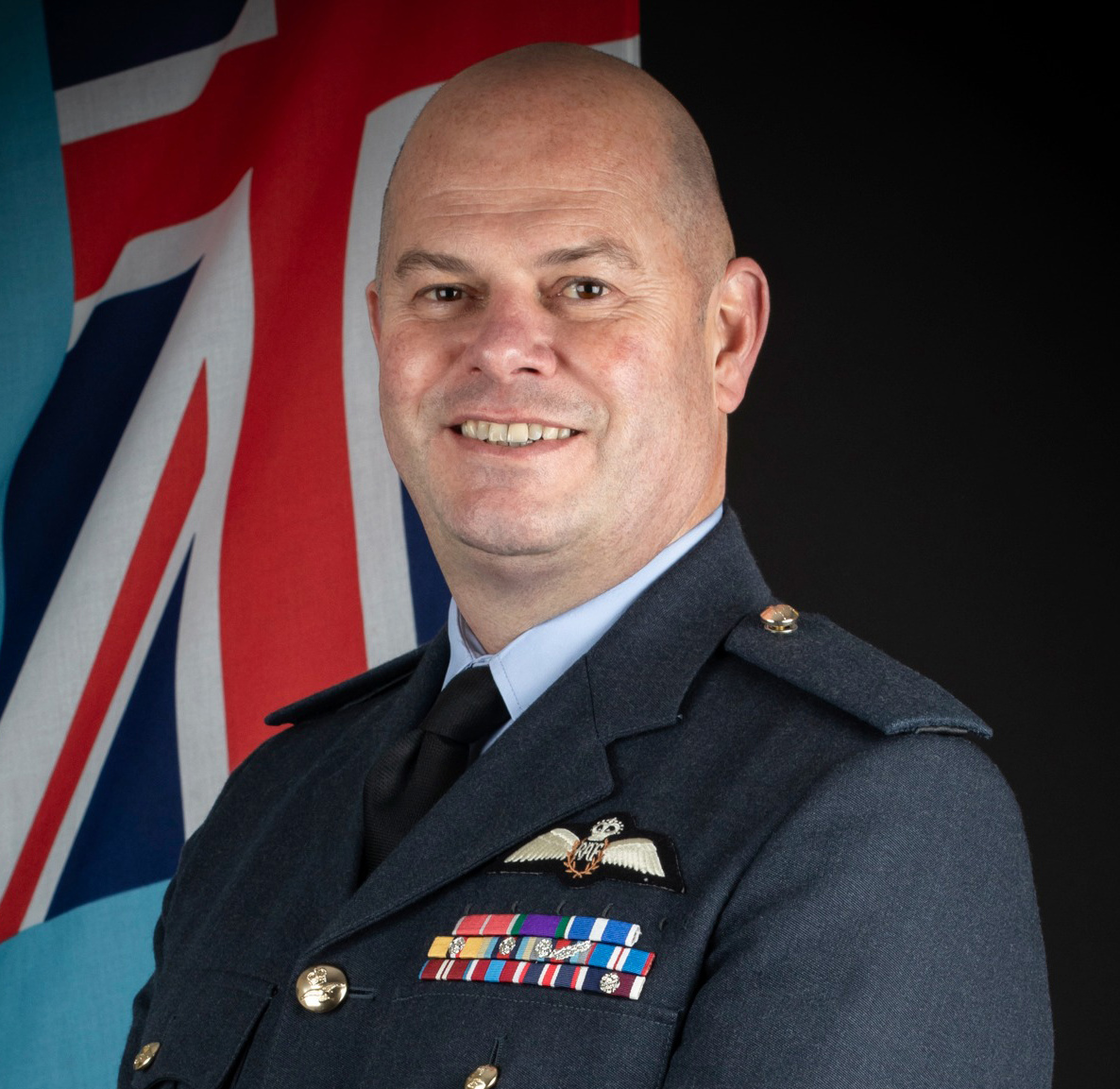
- Sharrocks in 2026
- Military career
- Allegiance: United Kingdom
- Branch: Royal Air Force
- Service years: 1999–present
- Rank: Air Vice Marshal
- Commands: No. 22 Group RAF; No. 6 Flying Training School RAF
- Conflicts: Iraq War; War in Afghanistan; War against the Islamic State
- Awards: Commander of the Order of the British Empire; Queen's Commendation for Valuable Service

Air Vice Marshal Ian James Sharrocks, CBE is a senior Royal Air Force officer. He is the Air Officer Commanding No. 22 Group RAF.

== RAF career ==
Sharrocks joined the Royal Air Force (RAF) on 31 December 1999 and was commissioned on 15 January 2005. He went on to serve as commandant of No. 6 Flying Training School RAF, Royal Air Force College Cranwell before becoming head of flying training at No. 22 Group RAF in February 2022 and director of the Joint Services Command and Staff College in September 2024. He was promoted to air vice-marshal and appointed Air Officer Commanding No. 22 Group RAF on 12 November 2025.

Sharrocks was awarded a Queen's Commendation for Valuable Service in 2016, appointed an Officer of the Order of the British Empire in the 2020 Birthday Honours, and advanced to Commander of the Order of the British Empire in the 2025 Birthday Honours.

Military offices
Preceded by Ian Townsend	Air Officer Commanding No. 22 Group; 2025–present	Incumbent
