= Defence School of Photography =

Joint UK military photographic school

Defence School of Photography (DSoP)
- School badge
- Founded: 1972 (as Joint School of Photography)
- Country: United Kingdom
- Branch: British Army; Royal Air Force; Royal Navy
- Type: Defence training school
- Role: Photographic training
- Part of: Defence Intelligence Academy
- Location: RAF Cosford
- Motto: Luce scribimus (Latin for '(We) Write with light') (Note: Also translates as We write by light. This was the motto of the RAF School of Photography which became the motto of the Joint School of Photography in 1972. Whilst it was a joint school, it retained an approved RAF badge up until its name change to DSoP in 2003.)
- Accreditations: British Institute of Professional Photography; Royal Photographic Society

Commanders
- Current commander: Edwin Hedges

The Defence School of Photography (DSoP) is a training centre for all photographers drawn from the three arms of the British Military and the Civil Service. (Note: The Royal Marines are part of the Royal Navy.) The School has been located at RAF Cosford in Shropshire, England since 1963 and in its own purpose built building at Cosford since 1965. The school has gone through several iterations being firstly a Royal Flying Corps school, then a Royal Air Force School, then a Joint school before becoming the DSoP in 2003.

Its origins lie in the advent of the First World War, with training being developed as far back as 1912; the school lays claim to being the oldest technical training environment in the Royal Air Force, pre-dating the formation of the RAF itself.

In 2003, the school was renamed as the Defence School of Photography which widened the scope on training it could offer across governmental agencies. Since 2006 it has been under the command and control of the Defence Intelligence and Security Centre (DISC) at Chicksands alongside the Defence School of Intelligence (DSI), the Defence School of Languages (DSL) and the Royal School of Military Survey (RSMS). In 2015, DISC was renamed as the Joint Intelligence Training Group (JITG) which the DSoP still works under. In October 2025, the Defence Intelligence Training Group (DITG), the successor of JITG was reformed into the Defence Intelligence Academy (DIA) and DSOP was renamed The 'Photographic Faculty (DSOP)'.

== History ==
=== Background ===
The formation of aerial military photography was down to the determination of a small number of men who were in the Royal Flying Corps (RFC) but it was mostly down to Frederick Charles Victor Laws (affectionately known as 'Daddy Laws' by photographers). Laws was initially a Sergeant in the RFC and had a passion for photography. Despite Field Marshall Haig's reputed maxim that reconnaissance was best achieved by the Cavalry, (Note: There is some doubt that Haig actually said this; in the citation from Air Power Review, it mentions that it is more likely to be attributable to a technophobic officer under Haigh's command or part of his headquarters staff.) Laws and his cohort proved that aerial photography could provide information at a level of accuracy unseen before in theatres of war.

In January 1915, Laws, Lieutenant J T C Moore-Brabazon, Lieutenant C D M Campbell and 2nd Air Mechanic W D Corse were sent to test and report back on aerial photography. They produced such detailed reconnaissance of Neuve Chapelle with its intricate hidden defences that when the attack took place, the eventual human toll was far less than that of previous similar campaigns.

A School of Photography was established in 1915 with a formalised training centre at Farnborough (later RAF Farnborough) in January 1917. Laws came back as Commanding Officer twice; first as a Squadron Leader in 1924 and secondly as a Wing Commander in 1933. Because the school was created in 1915, it is referred to as the oldest technical training environment in the Royal Air Force (even though it is a defence school, it operated primarily for the RAF due to the aerial reconnaissance responsibility). The school was responsible for holding millions of exposed glass-plate negatives from the First World War. 130,000 would be gifted to the Imperial War Museum, whilst many others not considered important enough were simply buried in a hole in the ground at RAF Farnborough.

On the formation of the Royal Air Force on 1 April 1918, all photographers from the Royal Navy and the Royal Flying Corps became part of the RAF Photographic branch. The Royal Navy established its own photographic school at Tipner Ranges (under HMS Excellent) in 1920. This was a dedicated gunnery and torpedo school. During the early 1920s, T. E. Lawrence (under the alias John Hume Ross) was attached to the School of Photography whilst it was at Farnborough.

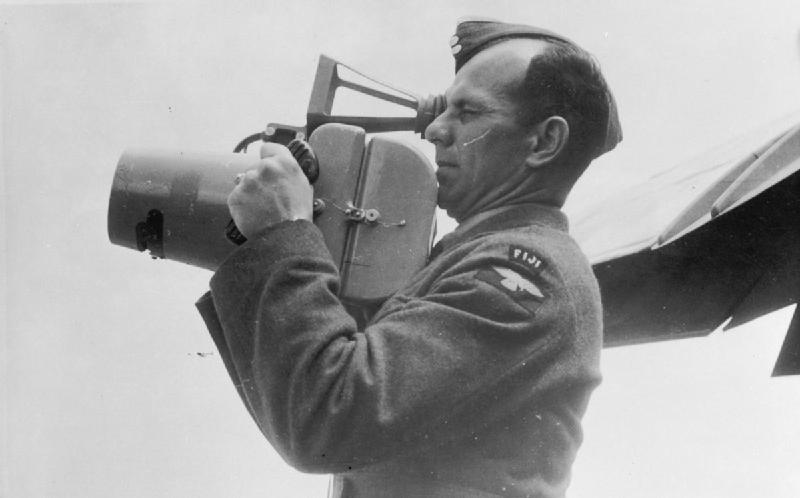
Aerial Photography during the Second World War

During the Second World War the school was renamed No. 1 School of Photography, as the need for reconnaissance and photographic experts became paramount, a second school was opened at a hastily converted technical college in Blackpool, Lancashire to cater for the upsurge in personnel. During this period, the School(s) of Photography came under the Royal Air Force Technical Training Command.

On 17 March 1947, the RAF school moved to Heath End, Hampshire, with the unit being renamed back to School of Photography RAF on 22 August 1949, the unit then moved into RAF Wellesbourne Mountford in Warwickshire on 6 January 1948. It used Avro Anson aircraft in its aerial photography training and stayed for fifteen years at Wellesbourne Mountford before moving on to RAF Cosford in Shropshire on 26 August 1963 as part of No. 2 School of Technical Training. A new building was designed and built specifically for photographic training at Cosford which is supposed to resemble a Rail Camera from the aerial perspective with Bellows as the front doors. Alec Brew in his book of photographs of RAF Cosford, describes the building opened in December 1965 as '...being a drab place enlivened by a marvellous mural.'

During the same period, the Royal Naval School of Photography had moved from Tipner Ranges to Felpham at Bognor Regis (1943), then in 1947 it moved on to HMS Peregrine (Note: The Royal Navy Photographic award is called the Peregrine Trophy.) at RNAS Ford. It moved to HMS Daedalus (Lee-on-Solent) in 1961 and then onto HMS Fulmar. (Note: This base became RAF Lossiemouth in 1972.) (where the Naval aerial photographic training was undertaken).

=== Formation ===
In 1972, the schools combined to become the Joint School of Photography (JSoP) when the Royal Navy closed their school at what was RNAS Lossiemouth. The Royal Navy and Army photographic training was formalised into a new programme at the school in Cosford alongside the Royal Air Force and was the first instance of formalised Joint training at RAF Cosford.

In 2003, the school became the Defence School of Photography which allowed it to train employees from across the military spectrum either enlisted or civilian. In 2015 the school celebrated its centenary with a special open weekend and formal dinner at the RAF Museum Cosford.

== Training ==
Royal Navy and Army trainee professional photographers are drawn from existing strength within their respective services. The Royal Air Force have traditionally taken on recruits as direct entrants with no military experience. (Note: RAF Photographers belong to Trade Group 14 in the non-commissioned branches.) The Royal Navy see being a sailor first as important to its overall ethos. On completion of successful professional photographic training, Royal Marine personnel transfer over to the Royal Navy but are allowed to keep their Green beret.

All three services have now had their training aligned into one professional photographic course which last for eight months. A civilian course with the same content and commensurate qualifications is normally undertaken over two years. All trained professional photographers have the opportunity to come back for further training in courses that enhance their skills.

Professional photographers are given NVQ's in their respective fields and the ability to receive a Modern Apprenticeship. They are also entitled to join the British Institute of Professional Photographers.

The DSoP also operates training for non-professional photographic staff, such as coastal survey and reconnaissance training.

== Military nicknames ==
Photographers in the military are commonly known as 'Phots'. In the Royal Air Force, they were traditionally known as 'Clicky's' whilst the original term for a photographer in the Royal Navy was 'Snaps'.

== Commanders ==
Unless annotated at the end of the name of the Commanding Officer, all are Royal Air Force.

Year	Rank and Name	Year	Rank and name	Year	Rank and name
1915	2nd Lt F C V Laws (RFC)	1941	Wg Cdr J B Newman	1974	Sqn Ldr A A Blain
1917	Lt C Porri (RFC)	1941	Wg Cdr A E Taylor	1976	Sqn Ldr G P Proctor
1917	Major P R Burchall (RFC)	1942	Wg Cdr P R Burchall	1978	Sqn Ldr G C Ashman
1920	Sqn Ldr A R Cooper	1943	Sqn Ldr W H Dunton	1982	Sqn Ldr G J Brown
1922	Sqn Ldr W J Guilfoyle	1945	Wg Cdr C G R Lewis	1985	Lt Cdr M H Larcombe (RN)
1924	Sqn Ldr F C V Laws	1947	Wg Cdr H C Westwood	1989	Sqn Ldr B A Broad
1930	Wg Cdr A H Steele-Perkins	1950	Wg Cdr E T Scott	1991	Lt Cdr C L Hamlin (RN)
1932	Wg Cdr H M Probin	1953	Wg Cdr G J Buxton	1993	Sqn Ldr V Kinnin
1932	Wg Cdr R H Neville	1955	Sqn Ldr S Hoskin	1996	Sqn Ldr S Ivory
1933	Wg Cdr F C V Laws	1955	Sqn Ldr J W Berry	1998	Mr J D Ness (Civil Service)
1933	Wg Cdr G Bowman	1959	Sqn Ldr P R Mayle	2000	Mr G H Sellars (CS) (Note: Former Royal Navy photographer.)
1934	Wg Cdr M L Taylor	1961	Sqn Ldr F R J Richardson	2010	Mr J J Jarvis (CS) (Note: Former Royal Air Force photographer.)
1936	Wg Cdr C Porri	1964	Sqn Ldr J E Bellingham	2018	Mr F Tomlinson (CS)
1938	Sqn Ldr J Silvester	1968	Sqn Ldr K M Hall	2022	Mr E Hedges (CS)
1939	Sqn Ldr R C Sturgiss	1972	Sqn Ldr W H P Brown		
1940	Wg Cdr H G Barrett	1974	Lt Cdr T Marriott (RN)		
