= Royal Air Force boy entrants =

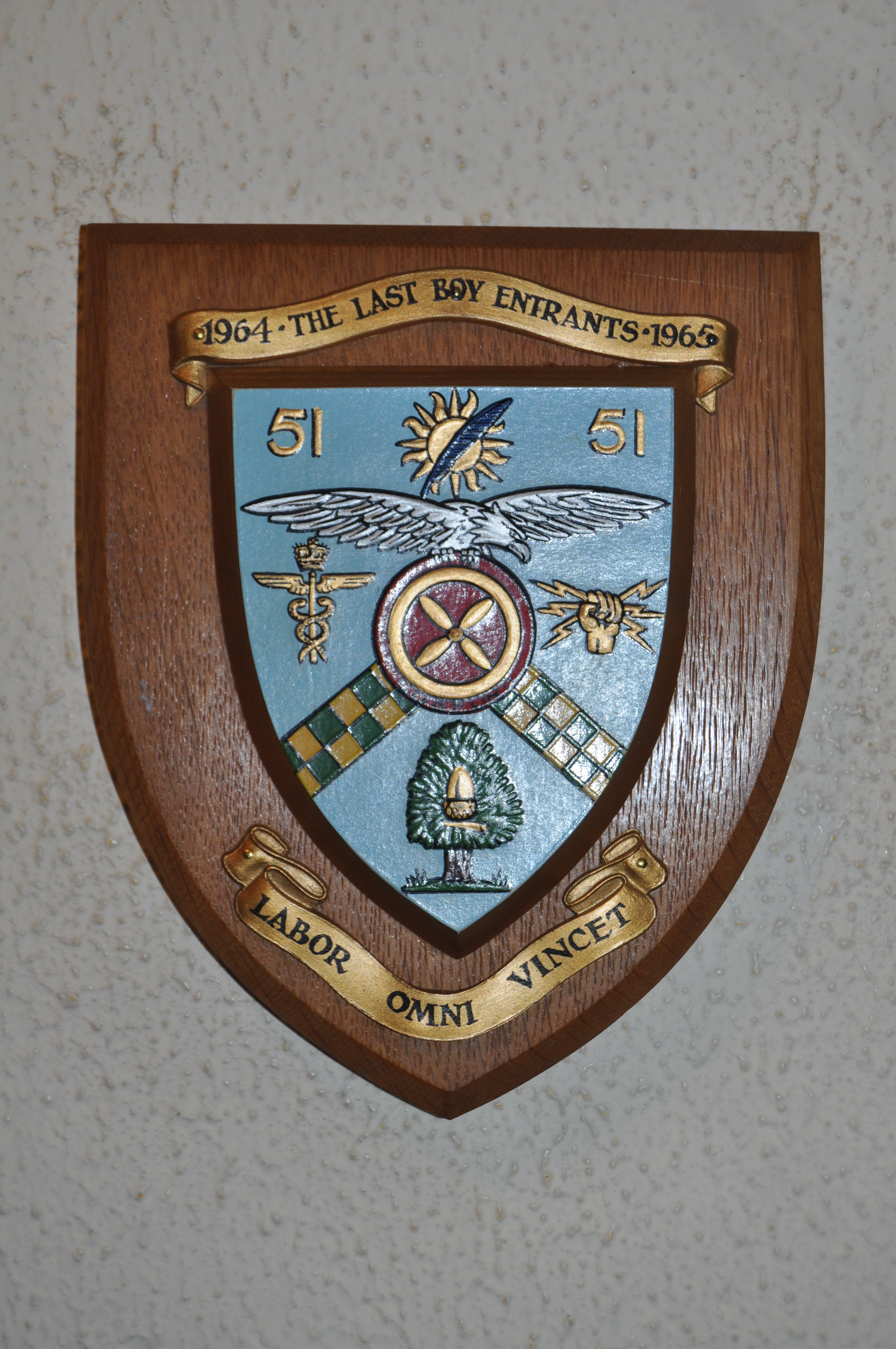
Plaque commemorating the 51st entry, RAF Cosford

Under the RAF boy entrant scheme which ran from the mid-1930s to late 1965, boys joined the Royal Air Force between the ages of 15 and 17 and were trained in various occupations (or trades) which fitted them for employment in the RAF. Training was suspended during World War II but recommenced in May 1947. The final entry was the 51st who commenced training in January 1964 and graduated in July 1965.

Training was undertaken at several RAF stations including RAF Cosford, RAF Yatesbury, RAF Compton Bassett, RAF St Athan, RAF Hereford and RAF Locking. Training took 18 months and included not just the trade and basic training but also more general academic education. After their 18 months of training, they moved to RAF duty stations and commenced employment in the trade they had trained on.

The boy entrant scheme provided training, and a focus in life, for boys that often had poor education. In the early post World War II years, this education had probably been severely disrupted by the war itself. In addition to technical training which focused on repair and maintenance of RAF equipment, there was a regimen of drill instruction where boys were subjected to extreme disciplinary measures and punished for minor offences by confinement to camp (Jankers).

In 1952, the 17th entry applicants, aged 15, were required to enter into a contract with the Air Ministry obligating the successful candidate to serve a minimum of ten years (effective from age 18) plus two years RAF reserve service. No pension payment was offered to those serving until age 28, who were discharged at the end of their contract with one month's paid leave as compensation. The 17th entry were also trained in the operational use and maintenance of firearms and other weapons: rifles with fixed bayonets, machine guns (Bren and Sten guns) and hand grenades.

Thanks to the RAF’s experience with aptitude and intelligence tests, and the knowledge that lack of education did not mean lack of intelligence, the RAF was able to train suitable candidates in appropriate trades and so assisted in creating the backbone of the RAF’s technical services during the years dominated by transient national servicemen.

The boy entrant scheme ran alongside the RAF apprentices scheme, where apprentice boys undertook two or three years training on similar lines.

== Sources ==
- Wg Cdr Joseph (Joe) Northrop, The autobiography of a Trenchard Brat, Square One Publications, 1993.
- RAF Museum Hendon website
- Brian Carlin, Boy Entrant, ISBN 978-1-4116-9433-0
- Wheels Up!: A Former RAF Boy Entrant's Recollections of Life in the Boy's Service in the Early 1960s, Bob Price, ISBN 1-903953-39-1
- Boy Entrants and Young Servicemen: Report (Command 4509), Committee on Boy Entrants and Young Servicemen, Stationery Office Books, November 1970 ISBN 0-10-145090-7
