= RAF Cosford =

Royal Air Force training base in Shropshire, England

RAF Cosford
- Near Cosford, Shropshire in England
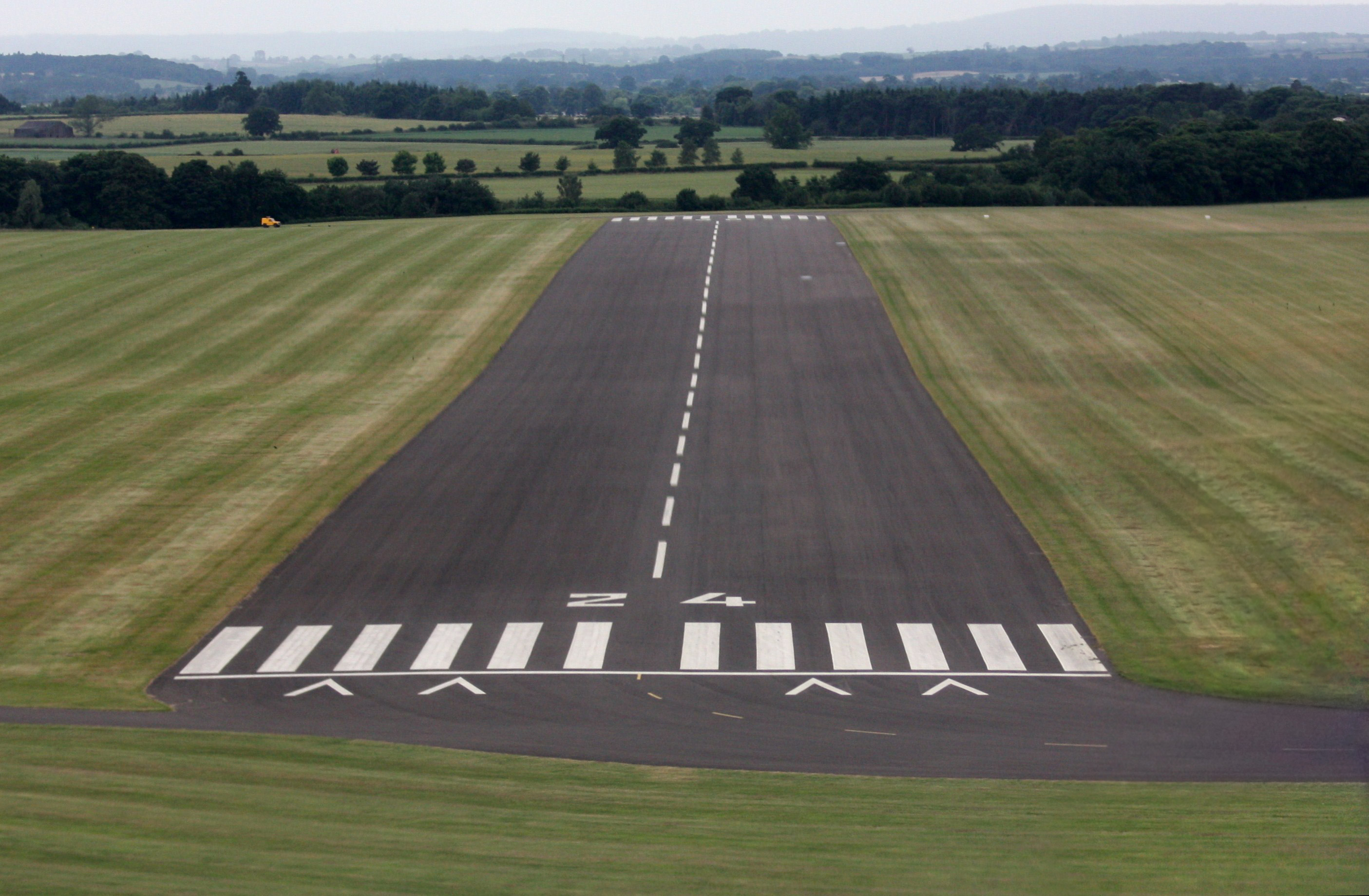
- Runway 24 at RAF Cosford

- Seul le premier pas coute (French for 'Only the first step is difficult.')

Site information
- Type: Royal Air Force station
- Owner: Ministry of Defence
- Operator: Royal Air Force
- Controlled by: No. 22 Group
- Open to the public: RAF Museum only
- Website: Official website www.rafmuseum.org.uk/midlands/

Location
- Shown within Shropshire
- Coordinates: 52°38′42″N 002°15′20″W

Site history
- Built: 1938
- In use: 1938–present

Garrison information
- Current commander: Wing Commander Ruth Wilson
- Occupants: HQ Defence School of Aeronautical Engineering; No. 1 School of Technical Training; No. 2 School of Technical Training; No. 1 Radio School; Defence School of Photography; RAF School of Physical Training; University of Birmingham Air Squadron; No. 8 Air Experience Flight

Airfield information
- Identifiers: ICAO: EGWC
- Elevation: 83 metres (272 ft) AMSL
Runways
Direction	Length and surface
06/24	1,127 metres (3,698 ft) Asphalt

Royal Air Force Cosford or RAF Cosford (formerly DCAE Cosford) (ICAO: EGWC) is a Royal Air Force station near the village of Cosford, Shropshire, England just to the northwest of Wolverhampton and next to Albrighton.

It is a training station, home to the Defence School of Aeronautical Engineering headquarters, the Defence School of Photography, No. 1 Radio School, and the RAF School of Physical Training. Thousands of Royal Air Force Boy Entrants were trained at the station in the 1950s and 1960s.

== History ==
=== Origins ===
RAF Cosford opened in 1938 as an aircraft maintenance, storage and technical training station. It was originally intended to be opened as RAF Donington (the parish in which it is located) but to avoid confusion with the nearby army camp at Donnington it was named after Cosford Grange House which was located at the south western edge of the airfield. To this day, it has remained mainly a training station. The Fulton barrack block was built just before the Second World War as the largest single building barrack block in the UK. The block was named after Captain Fulton (an early Air Force pioneer) and paid for by his widow, Lady Fulton. It is a listed building and is now used for technical training.

No. 2 School of Technical Training was formed in 1938. During the Second World War it trained 70,000 airmen in engine, airframe and armament trades. No 2 School of Technical Training was subsumed into the No 1 School of Technical Training when it moved to Cosford from RAF Halton in Buckinghamshire.

In March 1939 No. 9 Maintenance Unit RAF took up residence at Cosford. It was initially tasked to store, maintain, modify, repair and, ultimately, issue aircraft to operational units. Many Spitfires were prepared for operational service here.

In the Second World War No. 12 Ferry Pool ATA (Air Transport Auxiliary) was formed at Cosford. This unit delivered Spitfires from the station, returning with bombers or fighters for No 9 Maintenance Unit. Ferry flights were often flown by women pilots. Amy Johnson came to Cosford on more than one occasion.

In 1940 after the Fall of France a depot was established at RAF Cosford for Free Czechoslovak personnel joining the Royal Air Force Volunteer Reserve.

The airfield runway was originally a grass strip. During the bad winter of 1940–41 landing heavy aircraft, such as Vickers Wellingtons and Avro Ansons, turned the strip into a mudbath. This prompted the construction of a paved runway of 1,146 yards (1,048 m) long and 46 yards (42 m) wide.

The substantial RAF Hospital Cosford, staffed by the Princess Mary's Royal Air Force Nursing Service, was established at the station in 1940. It was the most westerly such RAF hospital in the UK. It consisted of wooden spurred huts. It was the main centre for repatriated prisoners of war, processing more than 13,000 by 1948. Many from the Far East had to remain for long-term treatment. The hospital was open to the general public as well as servicemen and women. It was closed on 31 December 1977 and demolished in 1980.

No. 9 Maintenance Unit closed in 1956. Its place was taken by No. 236 Maintenance Unit RAF which received and issued mechanical transport vehicles. This unit was to remain at Cosford for 10 years. In 1959 an air experience flight was established. It was primarily to give air experience to ATC cadets, although this was soon expanded to include Boy Entrants. This flight replaced the old station flight with an odd assortment of Tiger Moths, Ansons and Chipmunks.

In 1963 the RAF School of Photography moved to Cosford. In 1977, the RAF School of Physical Training returned to Cosford.

The extensive sports facilities at Cosford, located around a banked indoor running track, became well known nationally through televised annual indoor championships that featured top athletes from all over the world.

=== Defence Training Review ===
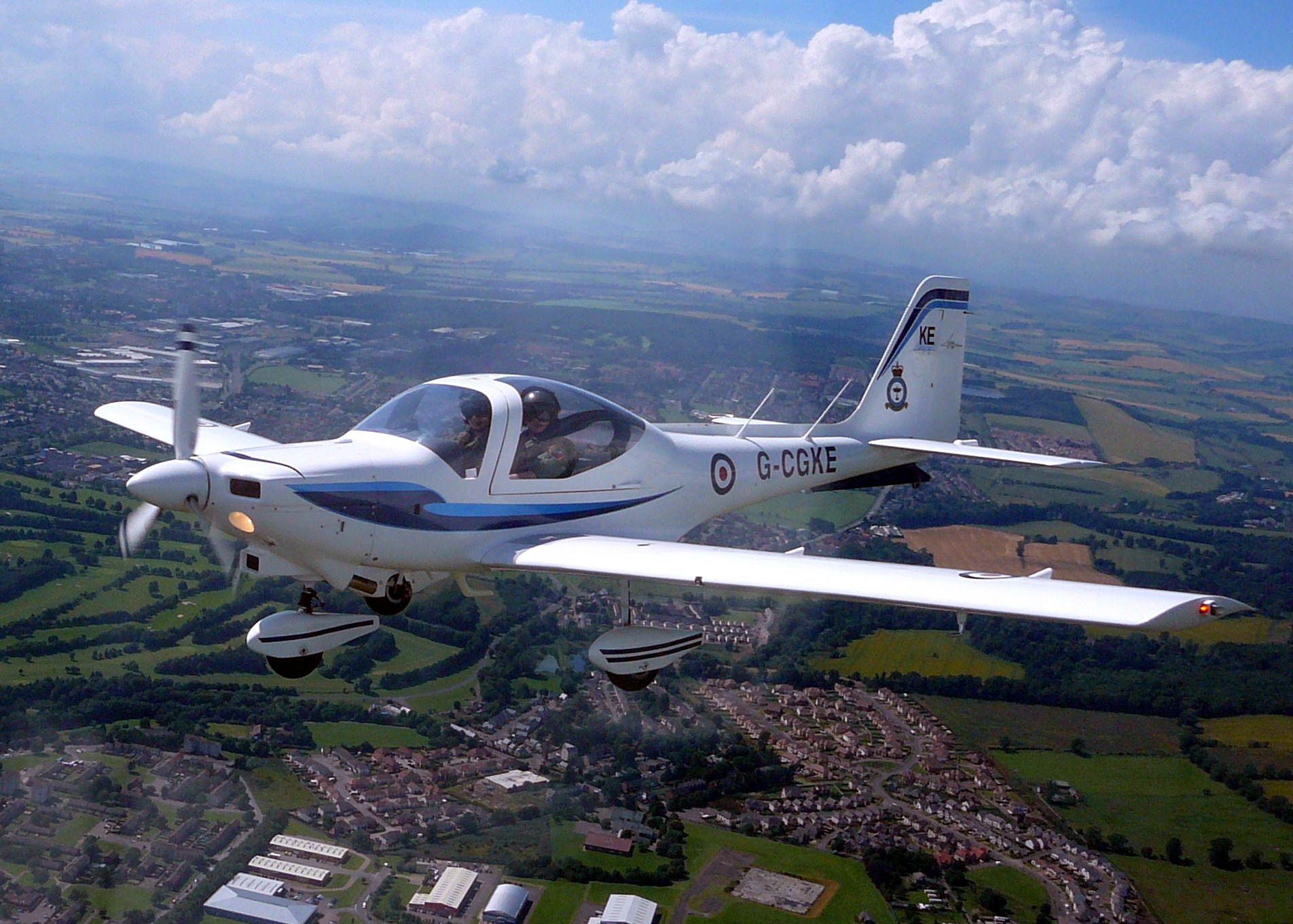
A Grob G 115E Tutor operated by No. 8 Air Experience Flight RAF posted to RAF Cosford.

Following the UK Government's 2001 Defence Training Review (DTR), the Ministry of Defence proposed handing over armed forces skills training to a private sector bidder for a 25-year term, and it was announced on 17 January 2007 that the Metrix consortium had been awarded Preferred Bidder status for Package 1 of this programme. As a consequence, it was anticipated that all technical training would move from Cosford to Metrix's main campus to be built on the RAF St Athan site over a 5-year period from 2008. This in turn was deferred with no anticipated move from Cosford to St Athan for DCAE and No1 RS staff and trainees before 2014–15 at the earliest. For those other training schools, headquarters and units then at Cosford, decisions were yet to be made about their future location.

On 31 January 2008, the Government announced that when 1 Signal Brigade and 102 Logistics Brigade withdrew from Germany they would move to Cosford. It was also noted that Metrix proposed to establish a Learning Centre and Design facility at the Cosford site.

In December 2012 the Government announced that training facilities from RAF Cosford would be moved by the end of 2015 to the site of the former RAF Station at Lyneham as part of the projected tri-service Defence College of Technical Training, in common with Army and Royal Navy training facilities that would also be consolidated on the site. However, on 15 September 2015, the Defence Secretary, Michael Fallon announced in Parliament by written statement that: the Lyneham site would be used only by the army; that Cosford would not be closed and would remain as a separate RAF training establishment; that it would be given extra work, with a fourth training school (No 4 School of Technical Training) moving to Cosford from MoD St Athan in south Wales. The announcement was described in local media as "a Government U-turn".

No. 633 Volunteer Gliding Squadron, which operated the Grob Vigilant T1, was disbanded in November 2016.

No. 2 School of Technical Training reformed on 20 July 2023 and took responsibility for the activities of the Aerosystems Engineer and Management Training School.

== Based units ==
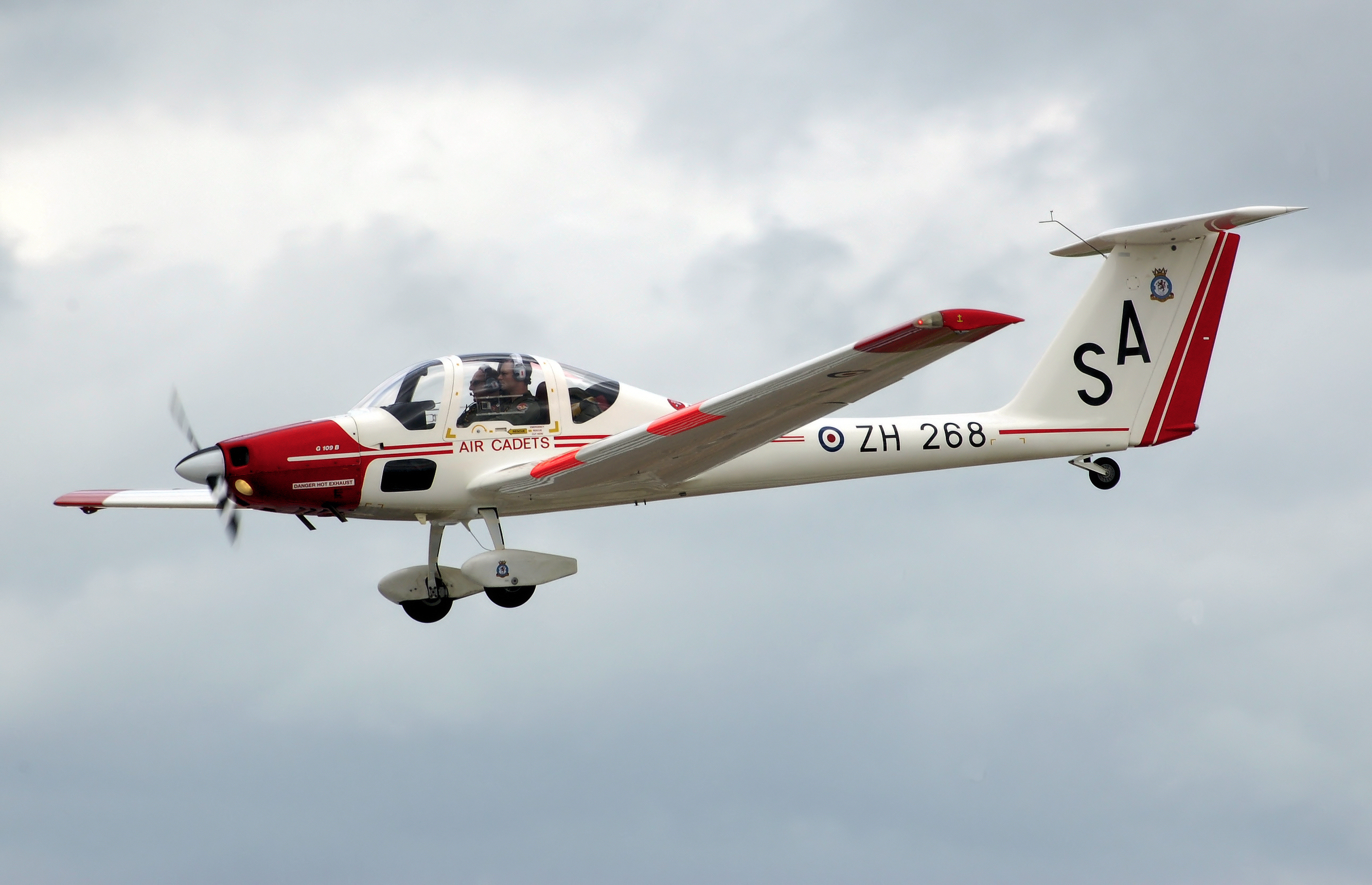
A Grob G 109B Vigilant Motor Glider which was operated by No. 633 Volunteer Gliding Squadron at RAF Cosford.

Flying and notable non-flying units based at RAF Cosford.

=== Royal Air Force ===
No. 22 (Training) Group

- Defence College of Technical Training
  - Defence School of Aeronautical Engineering
    - Defence School of Aeronautical Engineering Headquarters
    - No. 1 School of Technical Training
      - Headquarters No. 1 School of Technical Training
      - Aerosystems Training Squadron
      - Mechanical Training Squadron
      - Trenchard Squadron
    - No. 2 School of Technical Training
      - Headquarters No. 2 School of Technical Training
      - No. 238 Squadron
      - Academic Principles Organisation
      - Engineer Management Training Flight
      - Weapons and Survival Equipment Training Flight
- Defence School of Communications and Information Systems
  - No. 1 Radio School
- Defence College of Intelligence
  - Joint Intelligence Training Group
    - Defence School of Photography
- RAF School of Physical Training
- No. 6 Flying Training School
  - University of Birmingham Air Squadron – Grob Tutor T1
  - No. 8 Air Experience Flight – Grob Tutor T1
- Royal Air Force Air Cadets
  - Wales and West Region Headquarters
    - Air Training Corps
      - West Mercian Wing
        - West Mercian Wing Headquarters
        - No. 2497 (Cosford) Squadron
      - Staffordshire Wing
        - Staffordshire Wing Headquarters
    - Combined Cadet Force (RAF)
      - TEST Wales and West Area Headquarters

No. 2 Group (Air Combat Support)

- Reserves Logistics Support Wing
  - No. 605 (County of Warwick) Squadron (Royal Auxiliary Air Force)

RAF Voluntary Bands Association

- RAF Cosford Voluntary Band
- RAF Cosford Pipes and Drums

=== RAF Museum ===
- RAF Museum Cosford

=== Civilian ===
- Midlands Air Ambulance – Airbus Helicopters H145

== Role and operations ==
=== Training ===
Cosford became part of the Defence College of Aeronautical Engineering (DCAE), which was formed on 1 April 2004. The Defence College at RAF Cosford came under the Defence Technical Training Change Programme (DCTTP) and as such, with effect from 1 October 2012, was renamed the Defence School of Aeronautical Engineering (DSAE).

=== Air Ambulance ===
RAF Cosford's airfield site is home to one of the Midlands Air Ambulance helicopters. The first aircraft arrived on site in October 1991 with two other platforms based elsewhere in the region. Cosford remains the operations hub for the service.

== RAF Museum Cosford ==
The site is also home to the Aerospace Museum, which is a branch of the Royal Air Force Museum. Amongst the large collection of military aircraft is a unique collection of research and development aircraft, including one of two existing examples of the TSR2, a multi-role combat aircraft, controversially scrapped by the Wilson Government and still a point of discussion within the RAF.

The Cold War Exhibition was opened on 7 February 2007 by former prime minister Baroness Thatcher and HRH Princess Anne. Exhibits include the only collection of three V bombers (Valiant, Victor and Vulcan) in the same place in the world.

== RAF Cosford Air Show ==
Cosford Air Show
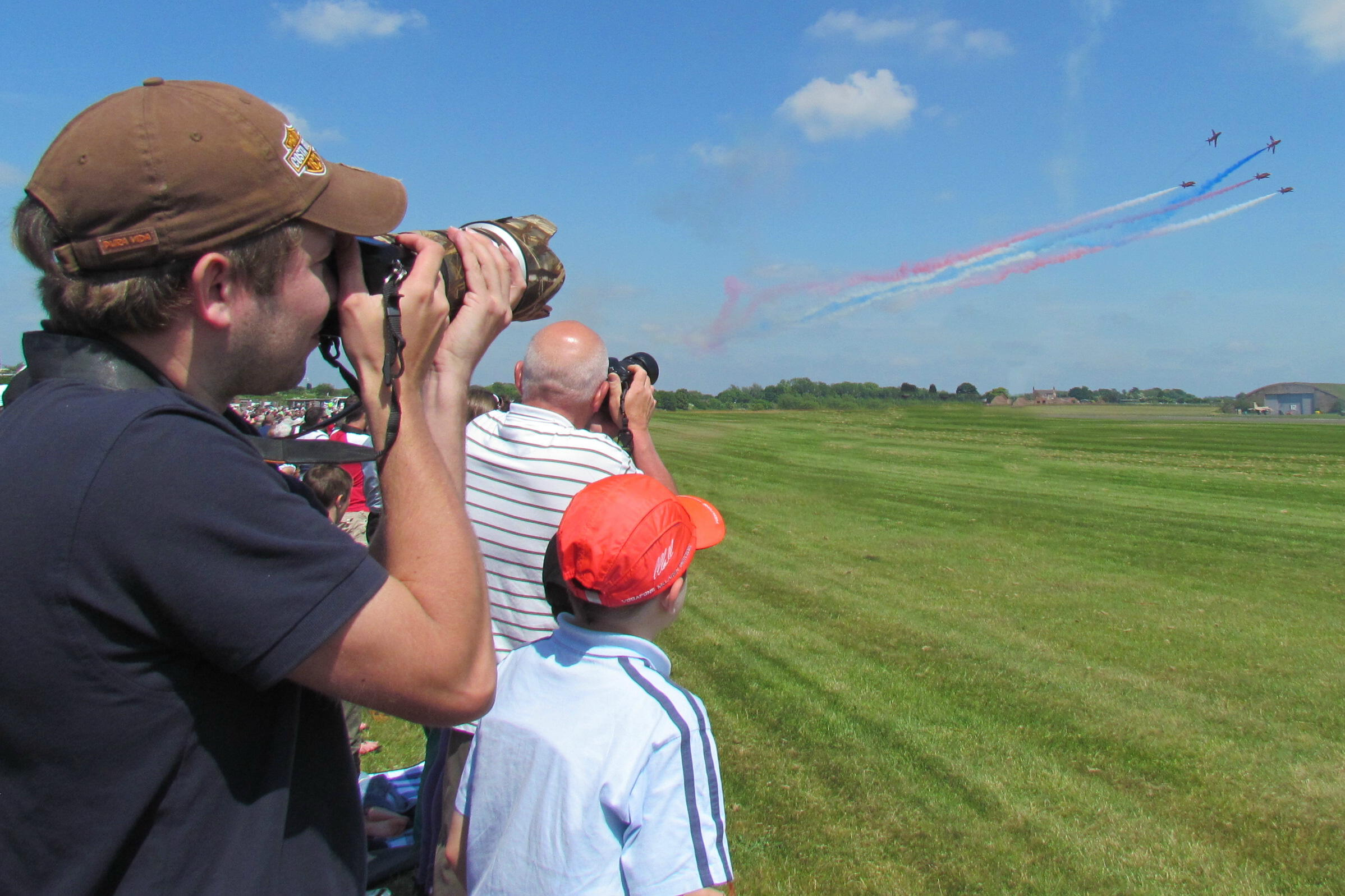
- The Red Arrows performing at the 2013 Airshow
- Status: active
- Genre: air show
- Date: Second Sunday in June
- Frequency: annually
- Venue: RAF Cosford airfield site
- Country: England
- Previous event: Cosford Air Show 2026
- Next event: Royal Air Force Air Show 2027
- Attendance: 50,000+
- Sponsor: Royal Air Force
- Website: CosfordAirShow.co.uk

The Cosford Air Show is now the only Royal Air Force (RAF) air show that is officially supported by the Royal Air Force in the United Kingdom, following the closure of RAF Leuchars, and the runway resurfacing at RAF Waddington. (Note: The airshow at Waddington was cancelled and has been reborn at RAF Scampton; however, the Air Force Board only support the Cosford Air Show directly within the RAF.) The latter events led to the ending of air shows at those RAF stations. The event at RAF Cosford regularly hosts flying and static displays which attract more than 50,000 people.

An airshow at Cosford was first proposed in 1978 and has continued to the present day. The event was cancelled in 2003 owing to an inability to secure enough operational military aircraft. The war in Iraq meant that RAF aircraft were fully committed, and none could be allocated for the air show. The runway at RAF Cosford is only 1,200 yards (1,100 metres) in length. Consequently, most flying displays necessitate aircraft being flown in either direct from their home stations, or after a temporary overnight deployment to RAF Shawbury which has a 300 yards (270 metres) longer runway.

The airshow varies in detail from year to year, but comprises the typical mix of flying and static displays, fun-fair rides, concession stands, food outlets, and trade stands. It also serves to raise money for charity, whilst also being seen by the Royal Air Force as a recruitment event, as part of its wider public engagement. Recent years have seen the promotion of science, technology, engineering, and mathematics (STEM) events, with guests such as Carol Vorderman highlighting the STEM approach. All profits raised at the event go to supporting charities officially recognised by the air show committee. The event in 2016 raised £115,000 for RAF charities.

In 2013, Prince Harry, as a member of No. 662 Squadron of the Army Air Corps, took part in the Apache helicopter demonstration at the air show, and, in 2018, Cosford hosted an RAF airshow marking the centenary of the Royal Air Force.

As there is restricted access by motor vehicle, all roads into the Cosford site are one-way during events, with traffic flow inwards in the morning and outwards in the afternoon and evening. Occasionally, there are tailbacks and queuing on the M54 motorway and the slip and access roads have to be closed on the site reaching its 18,000 vehicle parking limit. The local train operator, Arriva Trains Wales, offers a combined rail and air show ticket at a discount, allowing users direct access to the airshow on foot. Cosford railway station is next to the main crash gate access point at the eastern edge of the airfield.

There are hopes that the airshow might be extended to take place over two days, to rival to the Royal International Air Tattoo (RIAT), which attracts 150,000 spectators.

In June 2026, the airshow was rebranded from the Royal Air Force Cosford Airshow to the Royal Air Force Show, to reflect that it was the only RAF show remaining.

== Heritage ==
=== Station badge and motto ===
The RAF Cosford Badge is adorned with an oak tree and the motto is Seul Le Premier Pas Coute, which translates as Only the Beginning is Difficult. The oak tree is symbolic of the nearby oak at Boscobel which King Charles II took refuge in after the Battle of Worcester. The idea behind this association is that from little acorns, great oak trees grow (from trainees the airmen of the future grow). This badge was shared with the No. 2 School of Technical Training until 1986, when the School adopted a new badge depicting the iron bridge of Ironbridge and the motto, Scientia Pons Perpetuus Est which translates as Knowledge is a Lasting Bridge.

=== Built heritage ===
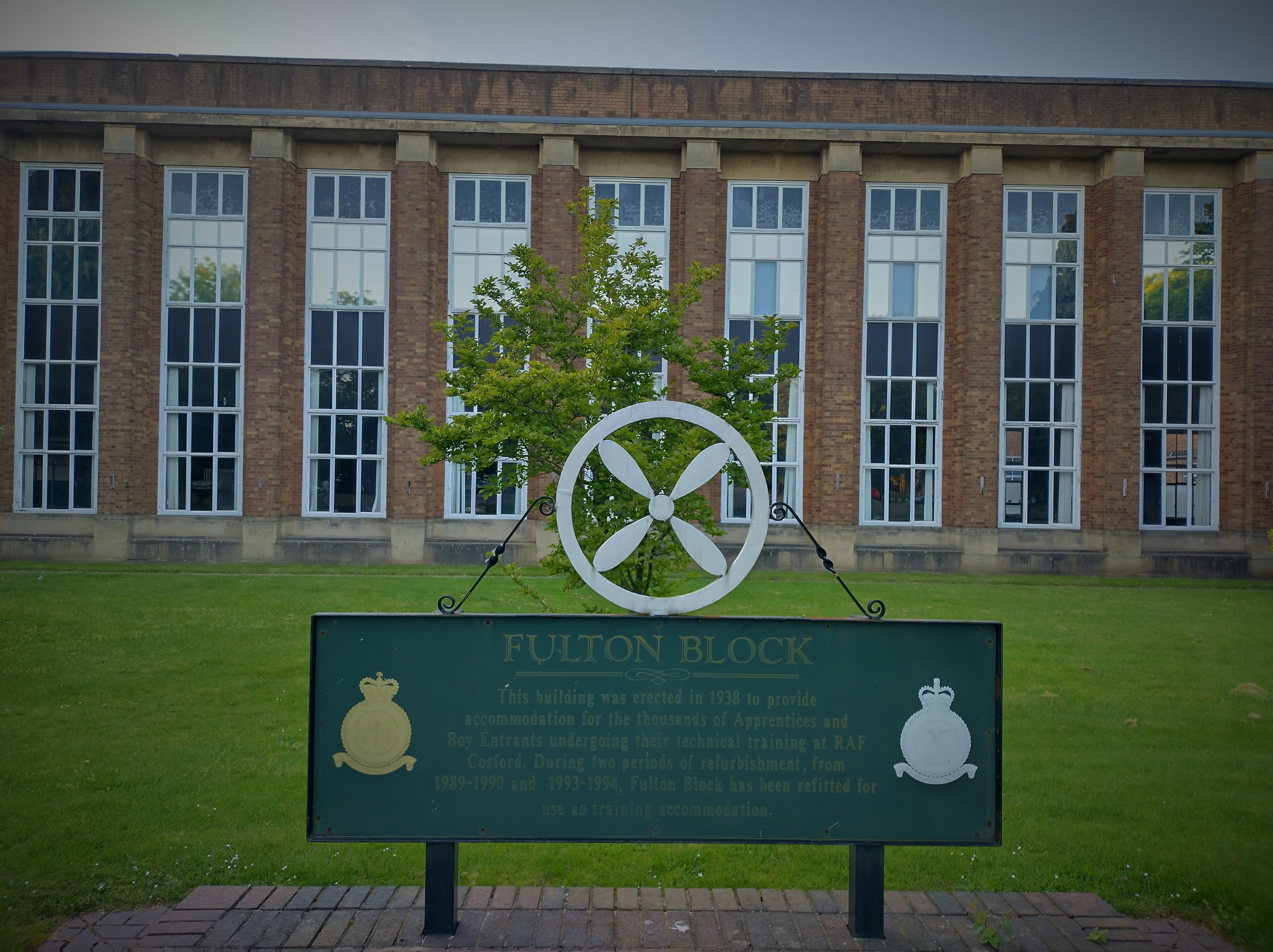
Fulton Block Cosford

The station's Fulton Block, a combined barracks block, institute and mess, was grade II listed in December 2005. Built between 1938 and 1939 as permanent accommodation for 1,000 personnel, it was designed in the Moderne architectural style by J H Binge, of the Air Ministry's Directorate of Works and Buildings.

== Station Commanders ==
The following are the Station Commanders for RAF Cosford, DCAE and DSAE Cosford.

Date	Name	Date	Name	Date	Name
July 1938	Group Captain W J Guilfoyle	August 1978	Group Captain D G Campbell	July 2020	Group Captain G J Bryant
November 1939	Group Captain W Budgen	October 1980	Group Captain W F Mullen	July 2022	Group Captain C Gibb
November 1940	Group Captain J McCrae	October 1982	Group Captain T J Morgan	January 2024	Wing Commander P Brady
February 1942	Group Captain W D Clappen	September 1984	Group Captain M W Windle	July 2025	Wing Commander Ruth Wilson BSC RAF
February 1943	Air Commodore C E H Allen	September 1986	Group Captain R M Best		
September 1946	Air Commodore P S Blockley	October 1988	Group Captain M Van Der Veen		
June 1948	Air Commodore R J Rodwell	October 1990	Group Captain M G Yeates		
January 1952	Air Commodore W L Freebody	November 1992	Group Captain M J Gilding		
October 1953	Air Commodore R J Pilgrim-Morris	April 1995	Group Captain S B Schofield		
April 1956	Air Commodore J R Mutch	February 1997	Group Captain A J Smith		
May 1956	Air Commodore R Harston	September 1998	Group Captain D N Williams		
March 1959	Group Captain A W Caswell, OBE	July 2000	Group Captain A J Burrell		
November 1961	Group Captain L H Moulton	July 2002	Group Captain A J Young		
May 1963	Group Captain C S Thomas	April 2004	Air Commodore S R Sims		
November 1965	Group Captain H Durkin	October 2006	Air Commodore N W Gammon		
July 1967	Group Captain H A J Mills	March 2009	Air Commodore C H Green†		
April 1970	Group Captain W M Smedley	May 2011	Group Captain J B Johnston		
August 1972	Group Captain C L Parkinson	April 2013	Group Captain A M Sansom		
January 1975	Group Captain A Thirkettle	July 2015	Group Captain M Hunt		
August 1976	Group Captain R L Smith	June 2017	Group Captain A J Baker		

† Died in office May 2011.

== Accidents and incidents ==
On 4 March 2000, Julian Paszki of Wrekin Gliding Club was killed when his Ex-RAF Chipmunk aircraft crashed. The aircraft was seen to veer left and dive into the ground despite being only 30 feet (9.1 m) in the air at the time. Mr Paszki was pulled alive from the wreckage but died at Selly Oak Hospital later that same day.

== In popular culture ==
RAF Cosford is the location for James May's Toy Stories, where the BBC's Top Gear presenter constructed a 1:1 scale Supermarine Spitfire in the style of an Airfix kit with the help of students from the Thomas Telford school and Air Cadets from the ATC.

== See also ==
- List of Royal Air Force stations

== Bibliography ==
- Brooks, Robin. Shropshire Airfields in the Second World War. Newbury, Countryside Books, 2008. ISBN 978-1-84674-105-0.
- Brew, Alec. RAF Cosford. Stroud, History Press, 2009. ISBN 978-0-7524-5211-1.
- McLelland, Tim. Action Stations Revisited: Wales and the Midlands No. Manchester, Crecy Publishing, 2010. ISBN 978-0-85979-111-3.
