= No. 8 Air Experience Flight RAF =

No. 8 Air Experience Flight
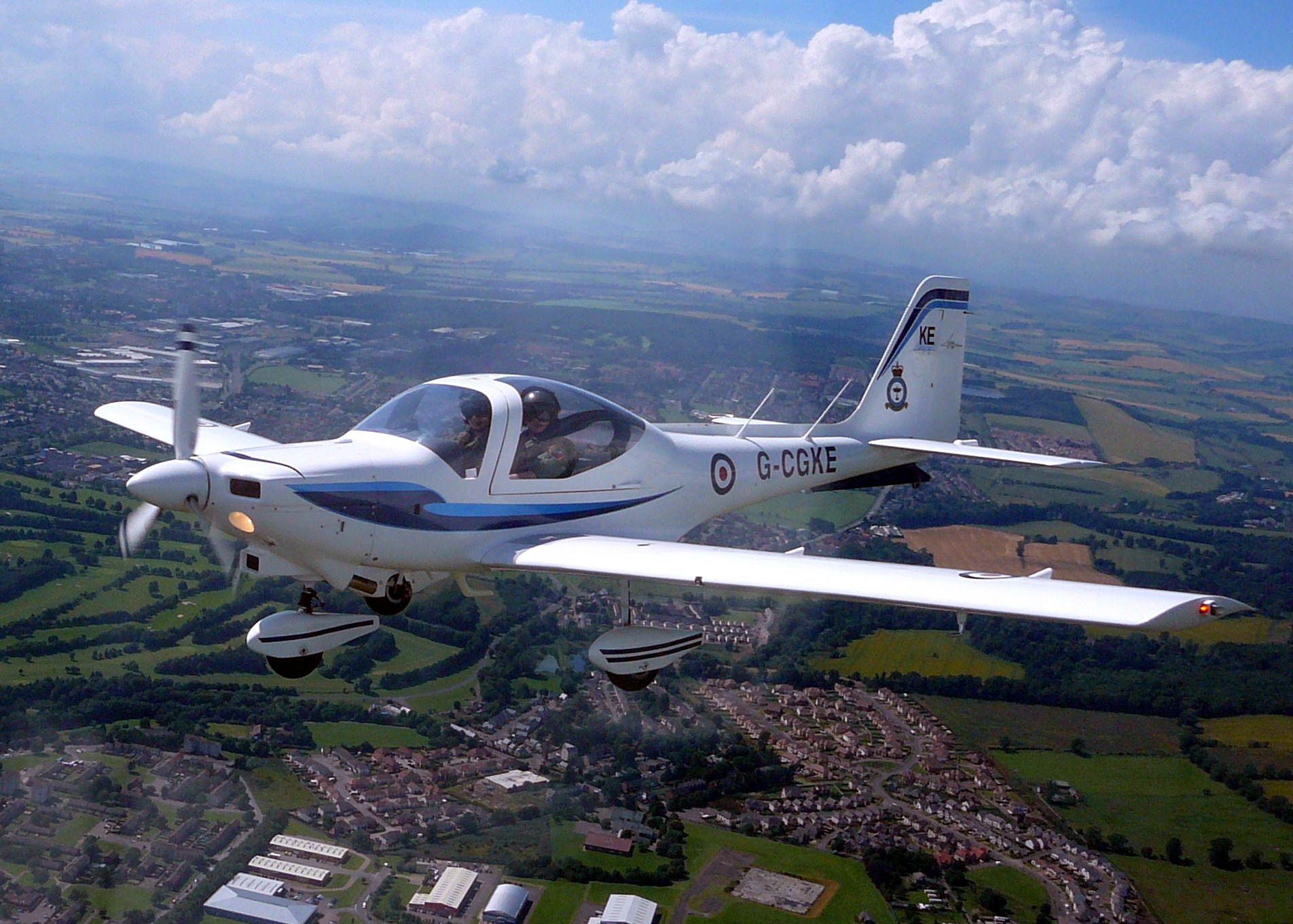
- Grob Tutor aircraft flown by 8 AEF
- Active: 8 September 1958 - Present
- Country: United Kingdom
- Allegiance: Royal Air Force
- Branch: Air Cadet Organisation
- Role: Training
- Part of: No. 6 Flying Training School RAF
- Garrison/HQ: RAF Cosford

Commanders
- Officer Commanding June 2012 - Present: Flight Lieutenant Jonathan Price
- Former Officer Commanding 2001 - 2012: Flight Lieutenant David Fowler

Aircraft flown
- Trainer: Grob Tutor

No. 8 Air Experience Flight (8 AEF) is an Air Experience Flight based at RAF Cosford.

== History ==
8 AEF was formed in October 1958 at Cosford, later moving to RAF Shawbury in 1960. It then returned to Cosford in 1978, moved again to Shawbury in 1979 and finally back to Cosford, where it has remained since April 1996. From 1 April 1996, it has been parented by the University of Birmingham Air Squadron, and they are equipped with 5 civil registered, Grob Tutor 115EA Mk 1s which are provided and maintained by Babcock, formally VT Aerospace.

== Background ==
No. 8 Air Experience Flight is one of thirteen Air Experience Flights run by the Air Cadet Organisation of the Royal Air Force. It was formed in the 1950s, along with the other AEFs, with the aim of teaching basic flying to members of the Air Training Corps, Combined Cadet Force (RAF Section) and occasionally, the Girls Venture Corps Air Cadets and the Air Scouts. It is based at DCAE Cosford and is used primarily and is parented by the University of Birmingham Air Squadron (UBAS).
