= University of Birmingham Air Squadron =

University flying squadron of the Royal Air Force

University of Birmingham Air Squadron RAFVR
- UBAS badge
- Active: 1941–present
- Role: Training, Recruiting
- Part of: No. 6 Flying Training School RAF
- Garrison/HQ: RAF Cosford
- Motto: Scientia Dabit Alas (Latin: Knowledge Will Give Us Wings)
- Equipment: Grob Tutor T1

Commanders
- Officer Commanding: Sqn Ldr M Holland
- Senior Student: APO Dominic French

Insignia
- Identification symbol: One blue, double headed lion rampant

The University of Birmingham Air Squadron, commonly known as UBAS, is a squadron within the Royal Air Force established on 3 May 1941. It is based at RAF Cosford, Shropshire, and flies a fleet of six Grob Tutors. In 2009 the squadron upgraded the aircraft to the Grob Tutor EA, which has an advanced avionics suite. The squadron has three flights, A, B and C; each with a student flight commander who holds the rank of acting pilot officer. UBAS is also the parent squadron of 8 Air Experience Flight, who jointly fly UBAS' Tutor fleet.

A squadron leader is the commanding officer, while UBAS also has several other qualified flying instructors, a ground training instructor, 15 civilian support staff who are contracted from Babcock, plus an adjutant and two civilian admin staff. There are some 70 members from the University of Birmingham, Birmingham City University, Aston University, Coventry University, Warwick University, Keele University, Wolverhampton University Staffordshire University, Worcester University, and Harper Adams University.

Students volunteer to join UBAS at their university's Freshers' Fair and then undergo a selection process. In case of selection, they are attested and join the Royal Air Force Volunteer Reserve. All students are given the rank of officer cadet, and are issued with a uniform. UBAS activities include flight, sports, military and leadership training, adventurous training, charity and community work and a vibrant social scene. The scope of UBAS, like other university air squadrons is to let young people experience life in the Royal Air Force and to develop their skills in the fields mentioned.

== History ==
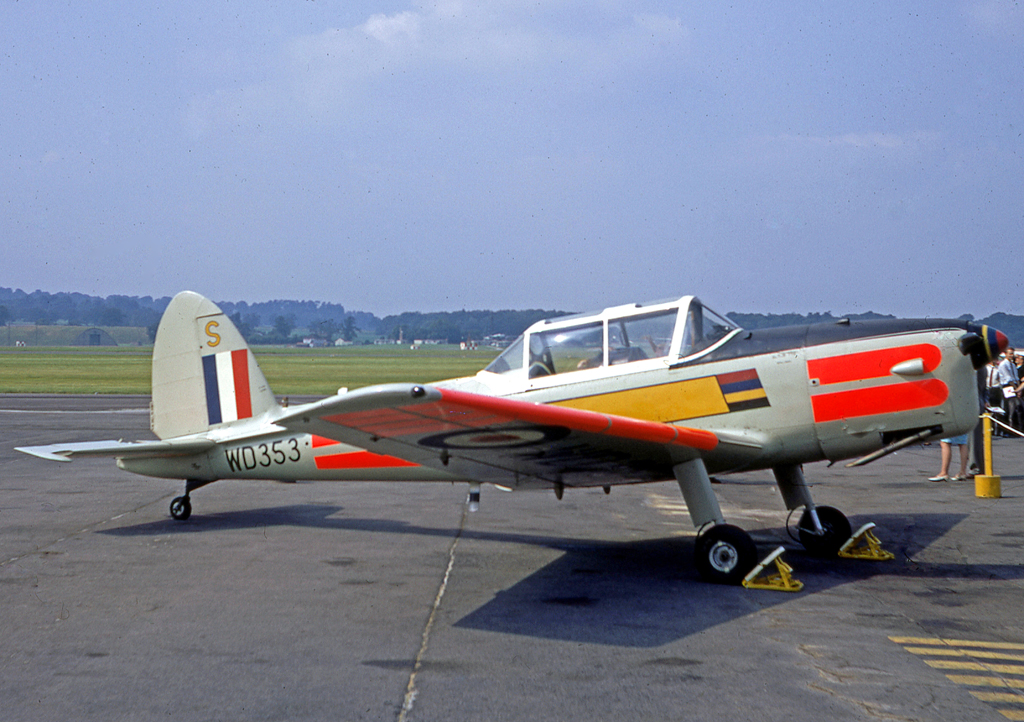
UBAS Chipmunk T.10 at RAF Shawbury in 1968

Birmingham University Air Squadron was formed on 3 May 1941 and began its first undergraduate initial officer training course in October 1942. In October 1946 it began flying training at RAF Castle Bromwich on the DH Tiger Moth T Mk 2 aircraft. The Squadron re-equipped with the DHC-1 Chipmunk T10 in July 1950 and was renamed the University of Birmingham Air Squadron (UBAS) on 15 October 1951.

The squadron was featured on BBC TV on Sunday 2 May 1954 at 7.45pm on 'Student Pilots', which showed the preparation for the De Havilland Trophy Competition, an annual aerobatics competition, on 15 May 1954, introduced by Squadron Leader A J Ogilvie DFC.

In March 1958 UBAS was relocated to RAF Shawbury. The Chipmunks served for 25 years until the SA Bulldog T1's replaced them in June 1975. UBAS moved "temporarily" to RAF Cosford in March 1978, and it has remained based there ever since. The Bulldogs were retired in 2001 and were replaced with the Austrian-built Grob G-115E Tutor aircraft. In November 2009 the Grob 115E's were partly replaced with the higher specification Grob 115 EA.

== Commanding officers ==
- Sqn Ldr Mark Holland 2026 - present
- Sqn Ldr Jamie Watson 2023-2025
- Sqn Ldr Colin Massy - 2021–2023
- Sqn Ldr Craig Finch 2019 - 2021
- Sqn Ldr Ged Sheppeck 2015–2019
- Sqn Ldr Phil Atkinson 2013 - 2015
- (Acting) Sqn Ldr Ian Grogan 2012 - 2013
- Sqn Ldr Mark Richardson 2009 – 2012
- Sqn Ldr Chris Parkinson 2007 - 2009
- Sqn Ldr Laurie Dunn 2005 - 2007
- Sqn Ldr Ged Sheppeck 2003 - 2005
- Sqn Ldr Andy Baker 2000 - 2003
- John Aiken (Royal Air Force officer) 1950-1953, later Air Chief Marshal

== Alumni ==
- Sqn Ldr Michael Child, University of Birmingham Environmental Geoscience, joined the RAF in 2001, Red Arrows from 2012
- Flt Lt Mandy Hickson, joined RAF in 1997, Author of: An Officer, Not a Gentleman: The Inspirational Journey of a Pioneering Female Fighter Pilot Paperback – 2 Jun. 2020
- Jed Mercurio, Medicine
- Sqn Ldr Martin Withers DFC, Joined RAF in 1968, Captain of Vulcan bomber that took part in the Black Buck 01 raid, Falklands war 1982

== Flying ==
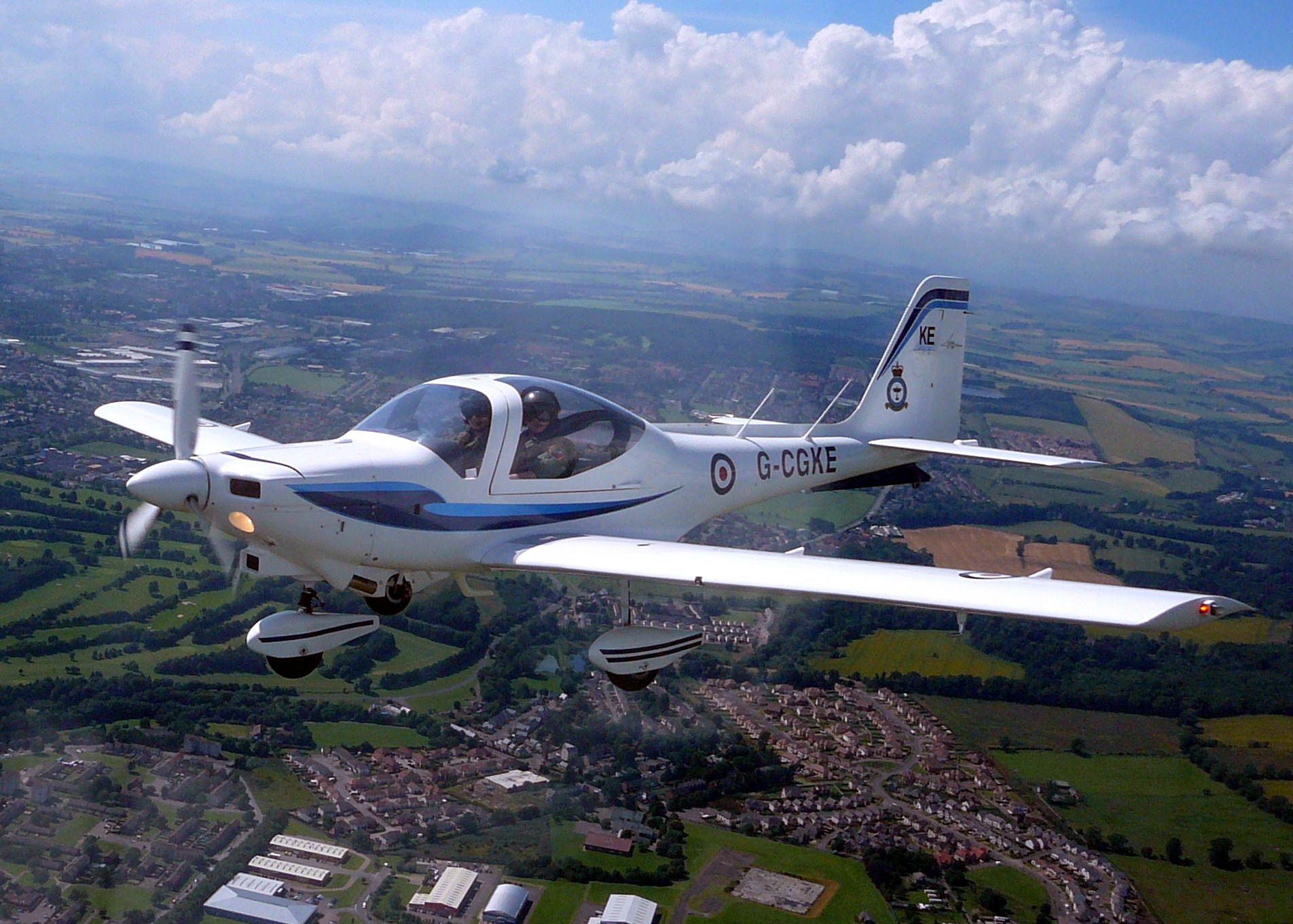
One of UBAS's Grob Tutors.

All of the cadets have the opportunity to participate in the flying syllabus for the University Air Squadrons.

Successful completion of the Core Syllabus qualifies the student pilot for the award of the Preliminary Flying Badge, or 'Budgie Wings' as they are sometimes called.

== Student Leadership Team ==
Squadron activities are largely run by students who take on various executive roles within UBAS. The squadron is split into three flights, each commanded by a Flight Commander who holds the rank of Acting Pilot Officer.

The squadron also has a Senior Student who is in overall command of all students, serving as a link between the student body and the staff. The current senior student is Acting Pilot Officer Dominic French.

== Incidents ==
- Friday 2 November 1962, 'WP922' crashed at Moreton, Staffordshire, took off 3.30pm, crashed 4.10pm, with Christopher Charles Butler, aged 20, of Byeways, Golf Links Road, Ferndown in Dorset; he joined in December 1960, a third year civil engineering undergraduate with 70 hours flying experience; he took off at Shawbury; the helicopter took off from Ternhill
- Thursday 23 June 1966, three were killed, in a mid-air collision at Tibberton, Shropshire from Shawbury; in 'WK631' was Pilot Officer Geoffrey Wallace Dowd, aged 25, from Upton, Merseyside, and the pilot was Pilot Officer Robert Anthony Spooner, aged 26, from Ackland, Middlesbrough; in 'WP834' was Michael David Fox, aged 21, from Rhodesia, of the University Air Squadron, from 'High Hall', Church Road, in Edgbaston, who was found to have coronary heart disease

== See also ==
- University Air Squadron units
- University Royal Naval Unit, the Royal Navy equivalent
- Officers Training Corps, the British Army equivalent
- List of Royal Air Force aircraft squadrons
