= List of de Havilland Canada DHC-1 Chipmunk operators =

The following countries and squadrons operated the de Havilland Canada DHC-1 Chipmunk:

== Civilian operators ==
Today, the Chipmunk remains popular with specialized flying clubs and is also operated by private individuals located in many countries worldwide.

== Military operators ==
Belgium

- Belgian Air Force In 1948, the Belgian Air Force acquired two DHC-1s for evaluation as a possible replacement for their de Havilland Tiger Moth trainers. In the end, they chose the Stampe-Vertongen SV.4 instead and the two Chipmunks were sold off to the civilian market in 1955. (retired)

Burma

- Burma Air Force (retired)

Canada

- Royal Canadian Air Force (retired)

(Sri Lanka) Ceylon

- Royal Ceylon Air Force (retired)

Denmark

- Royal Danish Air Force (retired)

Egypt

- Egyptian Air Force (retired)

Ghana

- Ghana Air Force (retired)

Ireland

- Irish Air Corps (retired)

Iraq

- Iraqi Air Force (retired)

Israel

- Israeli Air Force – One aircraft only. (retired)

Jordan

- Royal Jordanian Air Force (retired)

Kenya

- Kenya Air Force (retired)

Lebanon

- Lebanese Air Force (retired)

Malaysia

- Royal Malaysian Air Force (retired)

Portugal

- Portuguese Air Force (six in use)
  - Squadron 802, Águias (Sintra)
  - Air Force Academy (Academia de Força Aérea, Sintra)

Saudi Arabia

- Royal Saudi Air Force - 12 Chipmunk T.10s received in 1955. (retired)

Spain

- Spanish Air Force – One aircraft only. (retired)

Syria

- Syrian Air Force (retired)

Southern Rhodesia

- Rhodesian Air Training Group 4 Flying Training School. (retired)

Thailand

- Royal Thai Air Force, developed as RTAF-4. (retired)

United Kingdom

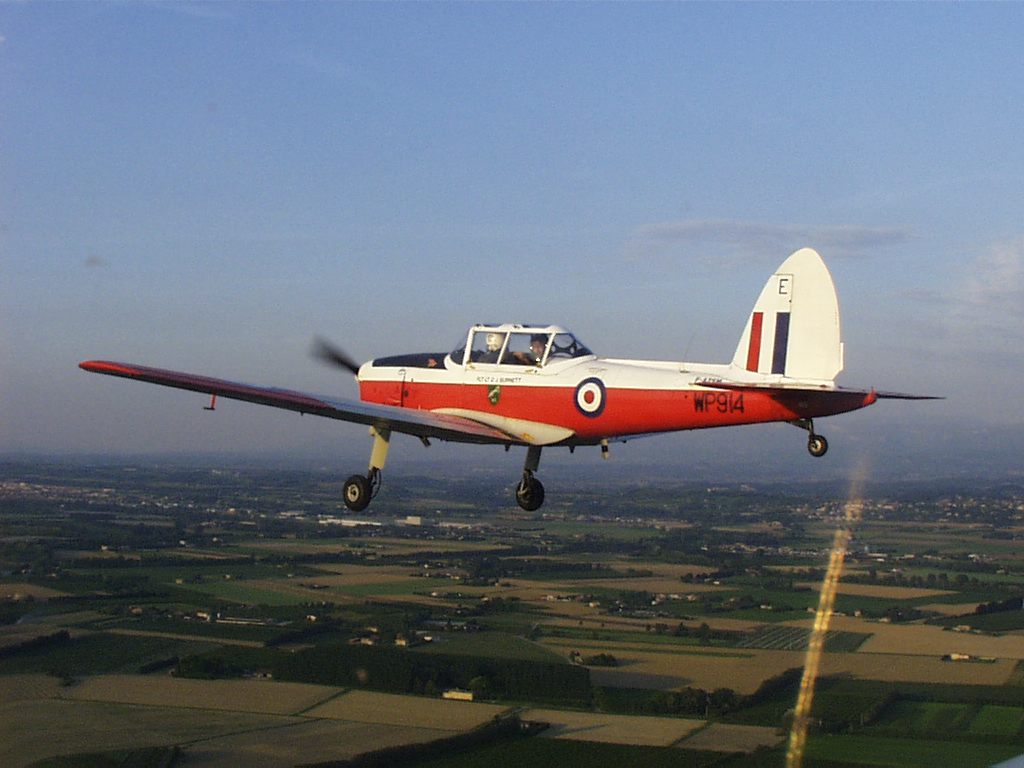
Privately owned DHC-1 Chipmunk F-AZSM

- British Army – Army Air Corps (retired)
  - Basic Fixed Wing Flight
  - Army Air Corps Historic Aircraft Flight
- Royal Air Force (retired, in use with Battle of Britain Memorial Flight)

Squadrons

- No. 31 Squadron RAF (1953-55)
- No. 114 Squadron RAF (1958-59)
- No. 275 Squadron RAF (1954-56)
- No. 613 Squadron RAuxAF
- No. 663 Squadron RAuxAF

Flights

- Aircrew Selection Centre
- No. 1 Air Electronics School
- The Air Observation Post School
- No. 1 Basic Flying Training School (1950-53)
- No. 2 Basic Flying Training School (1951-53)
- No. 3 Basic Flying Training School (1951-53)
- No. 4 Basic Flying Training School (1951-53)
- No. 5 Basic Flying Training School (1952-53)
- Battle of Britain Memorial Flight
- Bomber Command Communication Squadron

Air Experience Flights

- No. 1 Air Experience Flight RAF
- No. 2 Air Experience Flight RAF
- No. 3 Air Experience Flight RAF
- No. 4 Air Experience Flight RAF
- No. 5 Air Experience Flight RAF
- No. 6 Air Experience Flight RAF
- No. 7 Air Experience Flight RAF
- No. 8 Air Experience Flight RAF
- No. 9 Air Experience Flight RAF
- No. 10 Air Experience Flight RAF
- No. 11 Air Experience Flight RAF
- No. 12 Air Experience Flight RAF
- No. 13 Air Experience Flight RAF

Reserve Flying Schools

- No. 1 Reserve Flying School RAF
- No. 2 Reserve Flying School RAF
- No. 3 Reserve Flying School RAF
- No. 5 Reserve Flying School RAF
- No. 6 Reserve Flying School RAF
- No. 8 Reserve Flying School RAF
- No. 9 Reserve Flying School RAF
- No. 10 Reserve Flying School RAF
- No. 11 Reserve Flying School RAF
- No. 12 Reserve Flying School RAF
- No. 14 Reserve Flying School RAF
- No. 15 Reserve Flying School RAF
- No. 17 Reserve Flying School RAF
- No. 18 Reserve Flying School RAF
- No. 19 Reserve Flying School RAF
- No. 22 Reserve Flying School RAF
- No. 23 Reserve Flying School RAF
- No. 25 Reserve Flying School RAF

University Air Squadrons

- Aberdeen University Air Squadron
- Belfast (Queens) University Air Squadron
- Birmingham University Air Squadron
- Bristol University Air Squadron
- Cambridge University Air Squadron
- Durham University Air Squadron
- East Lowlands University Air Squadron
- East Midlands University Air Squadron
- Edinburgh University Air Squadron
- Glasgow University Air Squadron
- Hull University Air Squadron
- Leeds University Air Squadron
- Liverpool University Air Squadron
- University of London Air Squadron
- Manchester & Salford University Air Squadron
- Northumbrian Universities Air Squadron
- Nottingham University Air Squadron
- Oxford University Air Squadron
- St. Andrews University Air Squadron
- Southampton University Air Squadron
- University of Wales Air Squadron
- Yorkshire Universities Air Squadron

Station Flights

- RAF Aberporth
- RAF Acklington
- RAF Ahlhorn
- RAF Andover
- RAF Aston Down
- RAF Bassingbourn
- RAF Benson
- RAF Biggin Hill
- RAF Binbrook
- RAF Bircham
- RAF Brawdy
- RAF Bruggen
- RAF Buckeburg
- RAF Celle
- RAF Chatham (flying from Rochester)
- RAF Chivenor
- RAF Church Fenton
- RAF Colerne
- RAF Coltishall
- RAF Coningsby
- RAF Cottesmore
- RAF Debden
- RAF Detling
- RAF Dishforth
- RAF Driffield
- RAF Duxford
- RAF Dyce
- RAF Eastleigh (Kenya)
- RAF Edzell
- RAF Farnborough
- RAF Filton
- RAF Finningley
- RAF Gatow
- RAF Gaydon
- RAF Geilenkirchen
- RAF Gutersloh
- RAF Halton
- RAF Hemswell
- RAF Henlow
- RAF Honiley
- RAF Honington
- RAF Hornchurch
- RAF Horsham St. Faith
- RAF Hucknall
- RAF Jever
- RAF Jurby
- RAF Kinloss
- RAF Kuala Lumpur
- RAF Laarbruch
- RAF Leconfield
- RAF Leuchars
- RAF Lichfield
- RAF Little Rissington
- RAF Lyneham
- RAF Manston
- RAF Marham
- RAF Middleton St. George
- RAF Mildenhall
- RAF Odiham
- RAF Old Sarum
- RAF Oldenburg
- RAF Ouston
- RAF Penang
- RAF Rufforth
- RAF St. Athan
- RAF St. Eval
- RAF St. Mawgan
- RAF Scampton
- RAF Schwechat
- RAF Shawbury
- RAF South Cerney
- RAF Grantham
- RAF Stradishall
- RAF Swanton Morley
- RAF Ta Kali
- RAF Tangmere
- RAF Turnhouse
- RAF Upavon
- RAF Upwood
- RAF Waddington
- RAF Waterbeach
- RAF Wattisham
- RAF West Malling
- RAF West Raynham
- RAF Wildenrath
- RAF Wittering
- RAF Woodvale
- RAF Wunstorf
- RAF Wymeswold
- RAF Wyton
- RAF Yeadon
- Royal Navy – Fleet Air Arm (retired, in use with Fly Navy Heritage Trust)
  - 771 Naval Air Squadron (1983-93)
  - 781 Naval Air Squadron (1971-81)
  - Royal Navy Historic Flight (1993-)
  - RNAS Culdrose Station Flight (1972-74)
  - RNAS Lossiemouth Station Flight (1971-72)
  - RNAS Yeovilton Station Flight (1971-93)
  - Britannia Flight (1966-94)

Uruguay

- Uruguayan Air Force (retired)

Zambia

- Zambian Air Force (retired)

== See also ==
- de Havilland Canada DHC-1 Chipmunk
