= No. 1 Air Experience Flight RAF =

1 Air Experience Flight
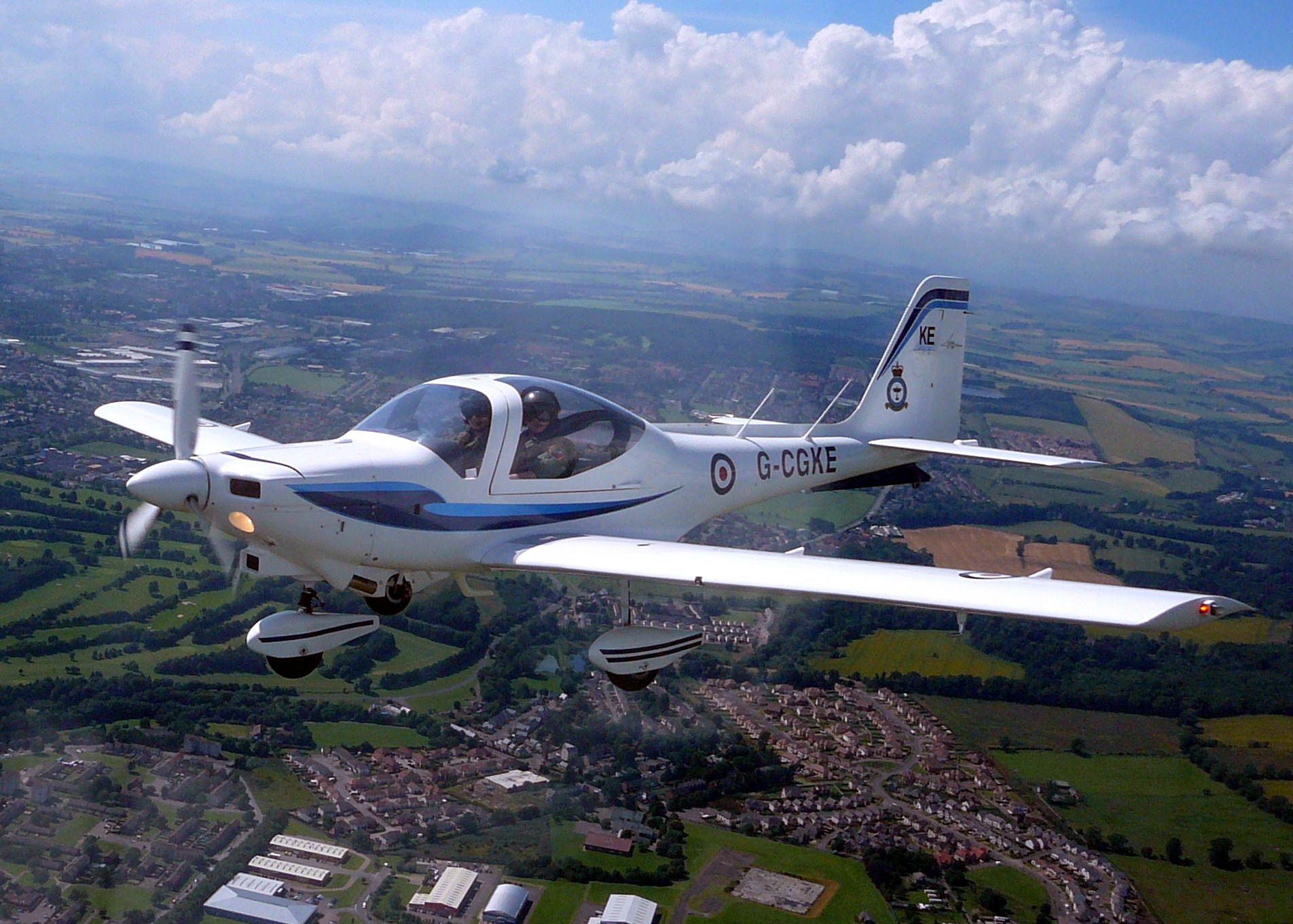
- Grob Tutor aircraft similar to that flown by 1 AEF
- Active: 8 September 1958 - Present
- Country: United Kingdom
- Allegiance: Royal Air Force
- Branch: Air Cadet Organisation
- Role: Training
- Part of: No. 6 Flying Training School RAF
- Garrison/HQ: MoD St Athan

Aircraft flown
- Trainer: Grob Tutor

No. 1 Air Experience Flight (1 AEF) is one of thirteen Air Experience Flights (AEFs) run by the Air Cadet Organisation of the Royal Air Force. The primary purpose of the AEF organisation is to provide air experience to members of the Air Training Corps, Combined Cadet Force (RAF) Section and occasionally, the Girls Venture Corps Air Cadets and the Air Scouts.

== History ==
No. 1 AEF formed on 8 September 1958 at RAF Biggin Hill in Kent, equipped with de Havilland Chipmunk T Mk 10 aircraft. It later moved to RAF White Waltham followed by RAF West Malling and then to RAF Manston.

=== RAF Manston (1963–1995) ===

No. 1 AEF Flight Emblem whilst based at RAF Manston in Kent

==== Introduction ====
The Flight HQ and Crew Room was based for many years just north of the main runway (29L/11R) on the B2190 in corrugated World War II buildings adjacent to the Western Taxiway (as it was known then). The accommodation was shared at the time with the Bristow Helicopters civilian SAR Flight which flew the Westland Whirlwind. In the late 70s the Flight moved a little further north toward the cross roads (B2190 and B2050) at the centre of the airfield relocating to the former ASF (Air Servicing Flight) building near the old AVPIN store where it remained until the Flight closed in the mid-90s.

Throughout the Flight's thirty-two-year tenure at RAF Manston, No. 1 AEF primarily served the Kent and London Wings of the Air Training Corps whilst also being used by schools in the region, like The Judd School, Dulwich College, Alleyn's School and Haberdashers' Aske's Boys' School who had Combined Cadet Force (RAF) Sections.

==== Commanding Officers and staff ====
All the Flight Commanders at RAF Manston were regular serving RAF Officers initially of Flight Lieutenant rank and latterly of Squadron Leader rank who commanded in the main a pilot staff of RAFVR(T) Officers, many of whom were retired former RAF Officers. It was not uncommon for former Air Commodores, Group Captains, Wing Commanders and Squadron Leaders to return to uniform following retirement from the RAF as Flying Officers and Flight Lieutenants with the RAFVR(T) to carry on flying at weekends. The pilot staff comprised many experienced aircrew, some of whom had served operationally during the latter part of World War II, including one who flew with 617 Squadron but did not fly on the Dams Raid, and during the heightened tensions of the Cold War. A few of the pilot staff were ex-members of No. 500 Squadron RAF (County of Kent) RAuxAF who flew Gloster Meteor F8's then based at RAF West Malling before the Squadron closed in 1957.

The Flight also provided facilities for aircrew officers in ground appointments in London and the South East the ability to retain current flying practice on the Chipmunks. In addition the pilot staff included from time to time officers "holding" at RAF Manston prior to taking up flying posts elsewhere.

==== Flight operations ====
The Flight typically operated at weekends with four Chipmunk T Mk 10 aircraft flying five or six, thirty-minute, sorties during the morning wave and the same again for the afternoon wave. During the summer months, this could be extended especially during Air Cadet Summer Camps. CCF Flying was mainly conducted from Wednesdays to Fridays during school term time.

A typical AEF flight from RAF Manston would either be a "south below one", which would last approximately thirty minutes inland down to Dover (seeing the Shakespeare Cliff Channel Tunnel Site, Dover Castle, along with the location of the former Battle of Britain radar masts) and return up the coast for a "rejoin" at Sandwich, Kent (with a quick peer down the top of the Richborough Power Station cooling towers) or "west below one", again thirty minutes duration, inland to Canterbury (seeing Canterbury Cathedral) and return along the north Kent coast for a "rejoin" at Reculver (of Sir Barnes Wallis Bouncing bomb fame). If the weather was particularly unkind for the visiting cadets, then Plan B was known as "round the island" (a reference to the Isle of Thanet) either clockwise or anti-clockwise depending on the wind direction, with sorties lasting approximately twenty minutes. If the weather really "clamped" then Plan C was ground based, with a tour of Air Traffic and the Station Fire Section.

==== Unofficial emblem ====
It was in the late 80s that the Flight adopted an informal emblem depicting a grey elephant on a green shield background, which took inspiration from the elephants at Howletts Wild Animal Park at Bekesbourne, Canterbury which could clearly be seen against the green of the surrounding countryside.

==== Flying pigs ====
No. 1 AEF was "scrambled" in December 1976 to locate and track an inflatable "Pink Pig" that had become untethered in blustery conditions. In fact, it was the "Pink Pig" that was being used on the photoshoot for the cover of the Pink Floyd album "Animals" (linked to the "Pigs on the Wing" track). Nothing was seen as by the time the CAA lost radar contact on the pig near Chatham in Kent, it was at a height of 18,000 feet and still flying East.

==== A notable achievement ====
The Chipmunks of No. 1 AEF would typically tally circa 3,500 flight hours a year (equating to circa 7,000 cadet sorties), which means that in the thirty two years the Flight was at RAF Manston, nearly a quarter of a million cadets were flown, which is an enormous achievement by any standard.

==== Fleet technical information ====
In the early years, before the move to RAF Manston, the No. 1 AEF fleet was painted in an overall silver fuselage livery with distinctive yellow bands on the wings and the rear fuselage section which then evolved into an overall silver scheme with fluorescent orange dayglow panels (which faded quickly). This scheme further evolved into an overall grey fuselage with dayglow panels on the outer wings, fuselage, and engine cowls of the then RAF Training Command. A local modification was approved to stick the last digit (in dayglow) of the aircraft serial number to the nose of the aircraft just below the spinner to aid "front on" early identification when on the ground. By the mid-70s the fleet was then painted in the red, white and grey "Raspberry Ripple" colour scheme of Training Command, with their "flashing" black and white props, which the aircraft retained until their retirement. In the final years at RAF Manston the aircraft sported the "grey elephant on green shield" emblem just forward of the front cockpit on both sides of the fuselage. At this time the aircraft also carried a tail identification number in orange dayglow which usually consisted of the last digit of the aircraft serial number or if that was ambiguous, the second to last digit was used.
