= No. 9 Air Experience Flight RAF =

9 Air Experience Flight
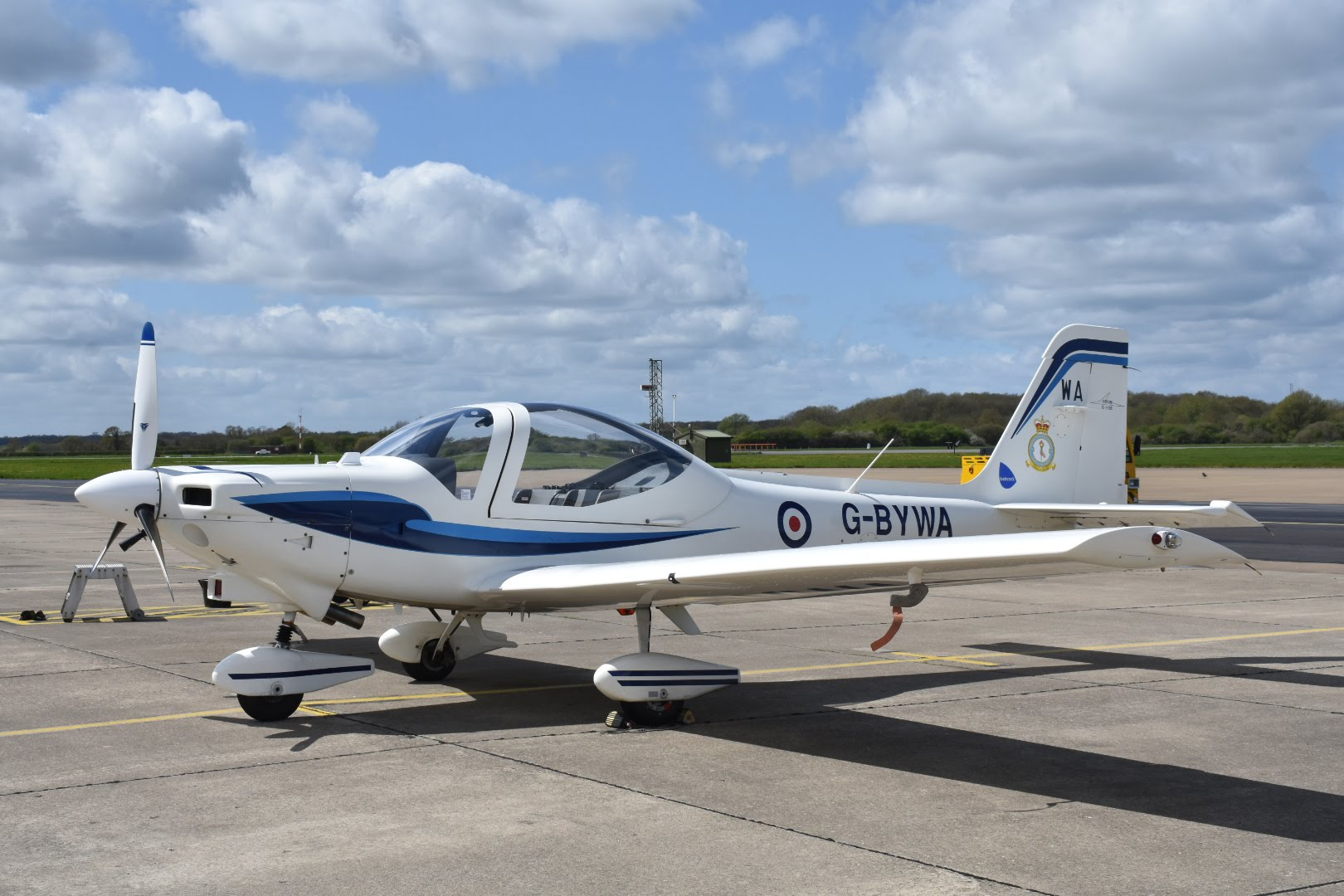
- Grob Tutor aircraft flown by 9 AEF at Linton On Ouse in 2018
- Country: United Kingdom
- Allegiance: Royal Air Force
- Branch: Air Cadet Organisation
- Role: Training
- Part of: No. 6 Flying Training School RAF
- Garrison/HQ: RAF Leeming

Aircraft flown
- Trainer: Grob Tutor T.1

No. 9 Air Experience Flight (9 AEF) is one of thirteen Air Experience Flights (AEFs) run by the Royal Air Force for the Air Cadet Organisation. The primary purpose of an AEF is to provide air experience to members of the Air Training Corps, Combined Cadet Force (RAF) Section and occasionally, the Girls Venture Corps Air Cadets and the Air Scouts.

== The Pilots and Staff ==
No. 9 AEF, like the other twelve AEFs employs a range of civilian and military staff; the pilots are all current or former RAF pilots. All civilian ground crew are provided by Babcock International under a private finance initiative (PFI).

== The aircraft ==
No. 9 AEF currently operate the Grob Tutor T1, a 2-seat light training aircraft, shared with the co-located Yorkshire Universities Air Squadron (YUAS), from RAF Leeming in North Yorkshire. Previously, No. 9 AEF were based at;

RAF Finningley before the airfield was decommissioned in 1996, with the de Havilland Canada DHC-1 Chipmunk T.10.

RAF Church Fenton before the airfield was decommissioned in 2013.

RAF Linton-On-Ouse as the last unit to serve at the station when it was decommissioned in 2020.

== Flying ==
Air experience flying provides a basic flying experience for cadets of the Air Cadet Organisation and other aviation related organisations, flying up to four or five training sorties a day for twenty five minutes at a time, including aerobatics.
