= No. 11 Air Experience Flight RAF =

11 Air Experience Flight
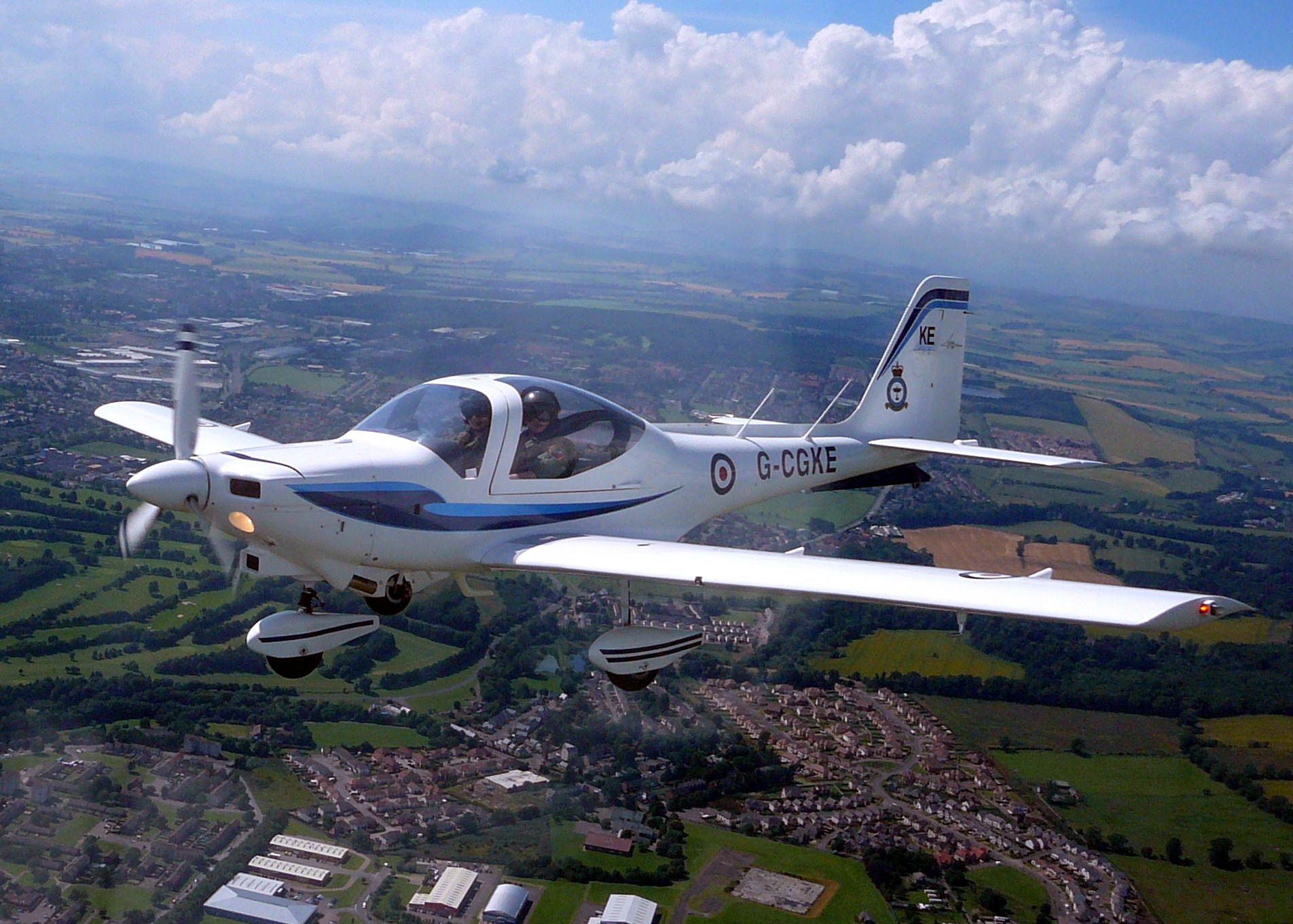
- Grob Tutor aircraft similar to that flown by 11 AEF
- Active: 8 September 1958 - Present
- Country: United Kingdom
- Allegiance: Royal Air Force
- Branch: Air Cadet Organisation
- Role: Training
- Part of: No. 6 Flying Training School RAF
- Garrison/HQ: RAF Leeming

Aircraft flown
- Trainer: Grob Tutor T.1

No. 11 Air Experience Flight (11 AEF) is one of thirteen Air Experience Flights (AEFs) run by RAFAC of the Royal Air Force. The primary purpose of the AEF organisation is to provide air experience to members of the Air Training Corps, Combined Cadet Force (RAF) Section and occasionally, the Girls Venture Corps Air Cadets and the Air Scouts.

== History ==
No. 11 AEF formed on 8 September 1958 at RAF Ouston in Northumberland, equipped with de Havilland Chipmunk T.10 aircraft.

It later moved to RAF Leeming then Teesside International Airport before returning to Leeming with the Grob Tutor T.1.
