= No. 5 Air Experience Flight RAF =

5 Air Experience Flight
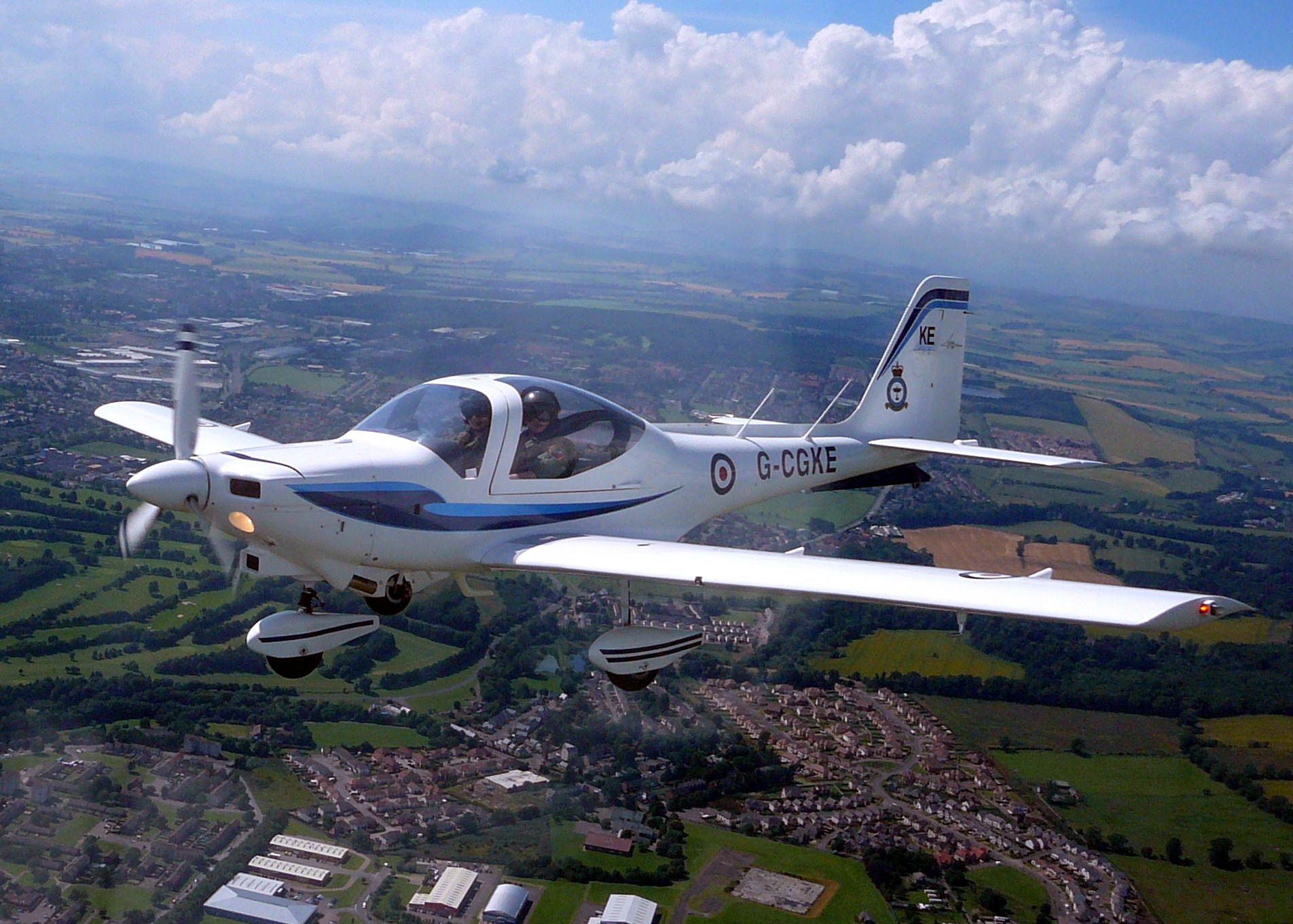
- Grob Tutor aircraft similar to that flown by 5 AEF
- Active: July 1958 - Present
- Country: United Kingdom
- Allegiance: Royal Air Force
- Branch: Air Cadet Organisation
- Role: Training
- Part of: No. 6 Flying Training School RAF
- Garrison/HQ: RAF Wittering

Aircraft flown
- Trainer: Grob Tutor T.1

No. 5 Air Experience Flight (5 AEF) is one of thirteen Air Experience Flights (AEFs) run by the Air Cadet Organisation of the Royal Air Force. The primary purpose of the AEF organisation is to provide air experience to members of the Air Training Corps, Combined Cadet Force (RAF) Section and occasionally, the Girls Venture Corps Air Cadets and the Air Scouts.

== History ==
No. 5 AEF was formed during July 1958 at Cambridge Airport in Cambridgeshire, equipped with de Havilland Chipmunk T.10 aircraft.

In 1969, Sir Billy Butlin presented a Beagle Husky (XW635) to the Air Training Corps which he had won in a raffle. It flew with 5 AEF, flying Air Cadets from Cambridge Airport until it was retired in 1989 and sold to a civilian user.

It later moved to RAF Swanton Morley but shortly afterwards it moved back to Cambridge it then moved to RAF Wyton and in 2014 it moved to its present home at RAF Wittering operating the Grob Tutor T.1.
