= No. 4 Air Experience Flight RAF =

4 Air Experience Flight
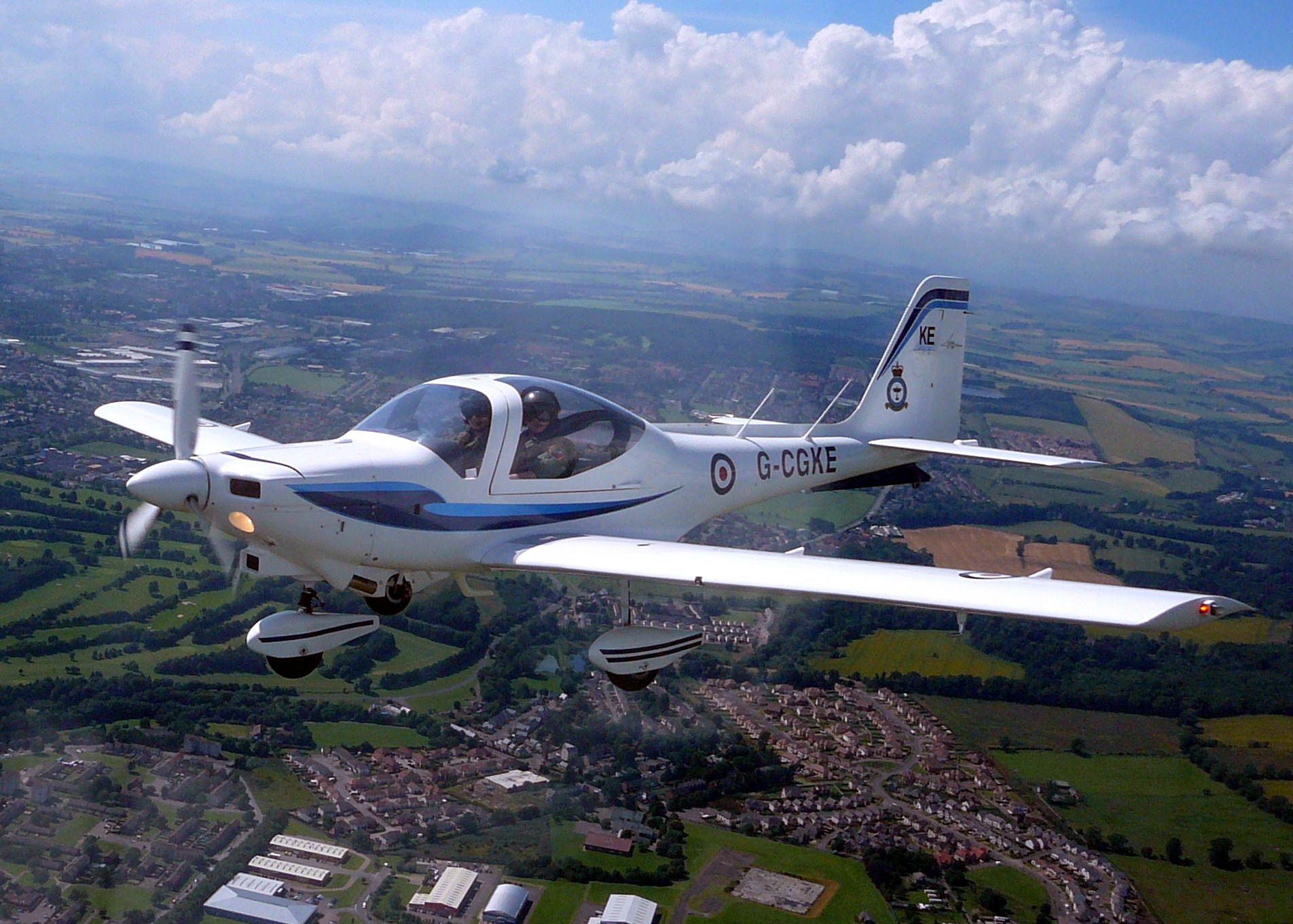
- Grob Tutor aircraft similar to that flown by 4 AEF
- Active: 8 September 1958 - Present
- Country: United Kingdom
- Allegiance: Royal Air Force
- Branch: Air Cadet Organisation
- Role: Training
- Part of: No. 6 Flying Training School RAF
- Garrison/HQ: Glasgow Airport

Aircraft flown
- Trainer: Grob Tutor T.1

No. 4 Air Experience Flight (4 AEF) is one of thirteen Air Experience Flights (AEFs) run by the Air Cadet Organisation of the Royal Air Force. The primary purpose of the AEF organisation is to provide air experience to members of the Air Training Corps, Combined Cadet Force (RAF) Section and occasionally, the Girls Venture Corps Air Cadets and the Air Scouts.

== History ==
No. 4 AEF formed on 8 September 1958 at Exeter International Airport in Devon, equipped with de Havilland Chipmunk T.10 aircraft until 27 December 1997 when it was disbanded.

It was reformed at Glasgow Airport during January 1998 initially with the Scottish Aviation Bulldog and latterly with Grob Tutor T.1's when the AEF's updated their aircraft in 2000/2001.
