= Royal Air Force Volunteer Reserve =

- Active: 1 April 1936–present
- Country: United Kingdom
- Allegiance: King Charles III
- Branch: Royal Air Force
- Type: Volunteer Reserve
- Website: Royal Air Force Reserves

Insignia
- RAF Ensign

The Royal Air Force Volunteer Reserve (RAFVR) was established in 1936 to support the preparedness of the U.K. Royal Air Force (RAF) in the event of another war. The Air Ministry intended it to form a supplement to the Royal Auxiliary Air Force (RAuxAF), the active reserve for the RAF, by providing an additional non-active reserve. However, during the Second World War, the high demand for aircrew absorbed all available RAuxAF personnel and led the RAFVR to quickly become the main pathway of aircrew entry into the RAF. It was initially composed of civilians recruited from neighbourhood reserve flying schools, run by civilian contractors with largely RAF-trained flying instructors as well as other instructors in related air war functions, such as observers and wireless operators.

After the war, and with the end of conscription in the early 1960s, the RAFVR considerably reduced in size and most functions were absorbed into the RAuxAF. The RAFVR now forms the working elements of the University Air Squadrons and the Defence Technical Undergraduate Scheme. It has a secondary function of managing groupings of Royal Air Force reservists for the management and operation of the RAF's Volunteer Gliding Squadrons and Air Experience Flights of the Royal Air Force Air Cadets.

== Early years of the RAFVR ==
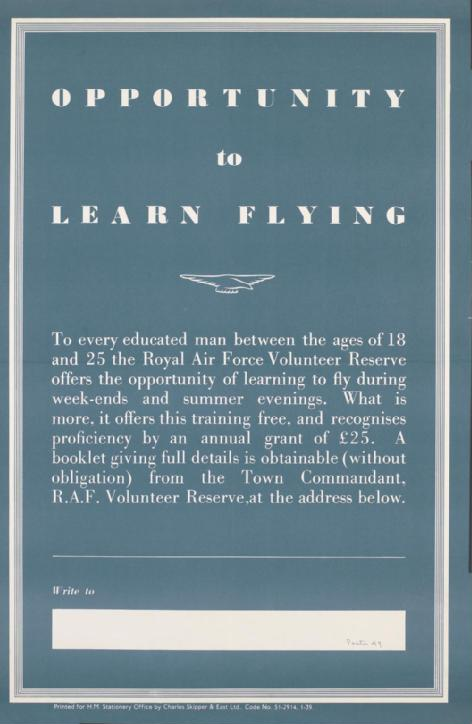
RAFVR recruitment poster, 1939

The RAF Volunteer Reserve was formed in July 1936 to provide individuals to supplement the Royal Auxiliary Air Force. The purpose was to provide a reserve of aircrew to draw upon in the event of war. The Auxiliary Air Force, which had been formed in 1925 by the local Territorial Associations, was organised by squadron and used local recruitment similar to the Territorial Army Regiments.

Initially the RAFVR was composed of civilians recruited from neighbourhood reserve flying schools. The flying schools were run by civilian contractors who mainly employed instructors who were members of the Reserve of Air Force Officers (RAFO) who had completed a four-year service commission as pilots in the RAF. Navigation instructors were mainly former master mariners without any air experience. Recruits were confined to men of between 18 and 25 years who had been accepted for part-time training as pilots, observers or wireless operators. When a civilian volunteer was accepted for aircrew training they took an oath of allegiance ('attestation') and were then inducted into the RAFVR. Normally they returned to their civilian job for several months until they were called up for aircrew training. During this waiting period they could wear a silver RAFVR lapel badge to indicate their status.

During the 1930s the RAFVR also began an informal association with the Air Cadet Organisation with members of the RAFVR arranging and implementing the cadet training.

=== The RAFVR during the Second World War ===
When the Second World War broke out in September 1939 the RAFVR comprised 6,646 pilots, 1,625 observers and 1,946 wireless operators. During the war, the Air Ministry used the RAFVR as the principal means of entry for aircrew to serve with the RAF. All those called up for Air Force Service with the RAF, both commissioned officers and other ranks, did so as members of the RAFVR under the National Service (Armed Forces) Act 1939.

By the end of 1941 more than half of Bomber Command aircrew were members of the RAFVR. Most of the pre-war pilot and observer Non-Commissioned Officers (NCO) aircrew had been Commissioned and the surviving regular officers and members of the RAFO filled the posts of flight and squadron commanders. Eventually of the "RAF" aircrew in the Command probably more than 95 per cent were serving members of the RAFVR.

During 1943, the decision was taken by the Air Ministry to raise an order for members of the RAFVR to remove the brass and cloth 'VR's worn on the collars and shoulders of officers and other ranks, as these were viewed as being divisive. No similar order was raised for members of the Auxiliary Air Force, who retained their 'A's on uniforms at that time.

== After the Second World War ==
After the end of the Second World War in 1945, the RAFVR was reconstituted in 1947 and continued to act as a focus for individuals who had a continuing obligation under the Acts. Its activities peaked at the end of the 1950s.

Following the end of conscription in 1962/63, the war-appointable RAFVR reduced in size to a small number of specialist support flights. In 1997 these were absorbed into the RAuxAF as the non-conscriptive RAF became an increasingly professionalised organisation. However the RAFVR continued in the Training Branch, RAFVR(T), and the University Air Squadrons, RAFVR(UAS). Many decades later they were joined by the Defence Technical Undergraduate Scheme, RAFVR(DTUS).

Members of both the RAFVR(UAS) and RAFVR(DTUS) are eligible (in exactly the same manner as for members of the RAF's active volunteer reserve, the RAuxAF) for published daily rates of pay when on duty, and also the annual reservist bounty or Proficiency Grant, as long as they maintain the required levels of personal fitness tested via the RAF, successfully complete the requirements of Common Core Skills in terms of military capability, and attend the required number of Man Training Days and Annual Continuous Training periods. This is evidenced by a Certificate of Efficiency signed off by the commanding officer of the individual concerned.

=== Association with the Royal Air Force Air Cadets ===
The association with the Royal Air Force Air Cadets (formerly the Air Cadet Organisation) was maintained by members of the RAFVR(T) who coordinated and administered at various levels of the command structure. This included CCF and ATC Squadron Officers, some CCF Contingent Commanders, ATC Wing and Regional Staff Officers, VGS and Air Experience Flight Pilots and Instructors. In December 2017, the Air Force Board determined that RAFVR(T) ranks within the Royal Air Force Air Cadets be removed. This was to make way for the introduction within all MOD-sponsored cadet forces of the Cadet Forces Commission (CFC), which was introduced in 2017.

RAFVR Officer Cadets and Acting Pilot Officers within the UAS continue in their capacity as members of the University Air Squadrons. Following the advent of the Marston Report, and the removal of the requirement to follow the RAF Elementary Flying Training syllabus (replaced instead by an extended syllabus that includes value-added flying), there has been a much greater emphasis on the development of military skills, building existing leadership abilities and expanding the officer potential within the current membership.

RAFVR Officer Cadets are also members of the Defence Technical Undergraduate Scheme, a scheme which marries the benefits of studying science and engineering degrees with leadership and teamwork, under RAF sponsorship, whilst attending one of a small number of designated universities. During this period of study, members of the RAFVR(DTUS) are associated with their university's DTUS Squadron which provides members with a varied syllabus of activities including military and leadership training, physical fitness, adventure training and attachments to RAF units both in the UK and overseas. DTUS is to shut down over a five year transition period following the announced closure of Welbeck Defence Sixth Form College (DSFC), scheduled for 2021.

== See also ==
- University Air Squadrons
- Royal Air Force Volunteer Reserve (Training Branch)
- Royal Air Force Air Cadets
  - Air Training Corps
  - Combined Cadet Force
- Air Experience Flight
- Volunteer Gliding Squadrons

== Bibliography ==
- Terraine, John (1985). The Right of the Line. London: Hodder and Stoughton. ISBN 0-340-26644-9.
