= No. 2 Air Experience Flight RAF =

RAF military unit

2 Air Experience Flight
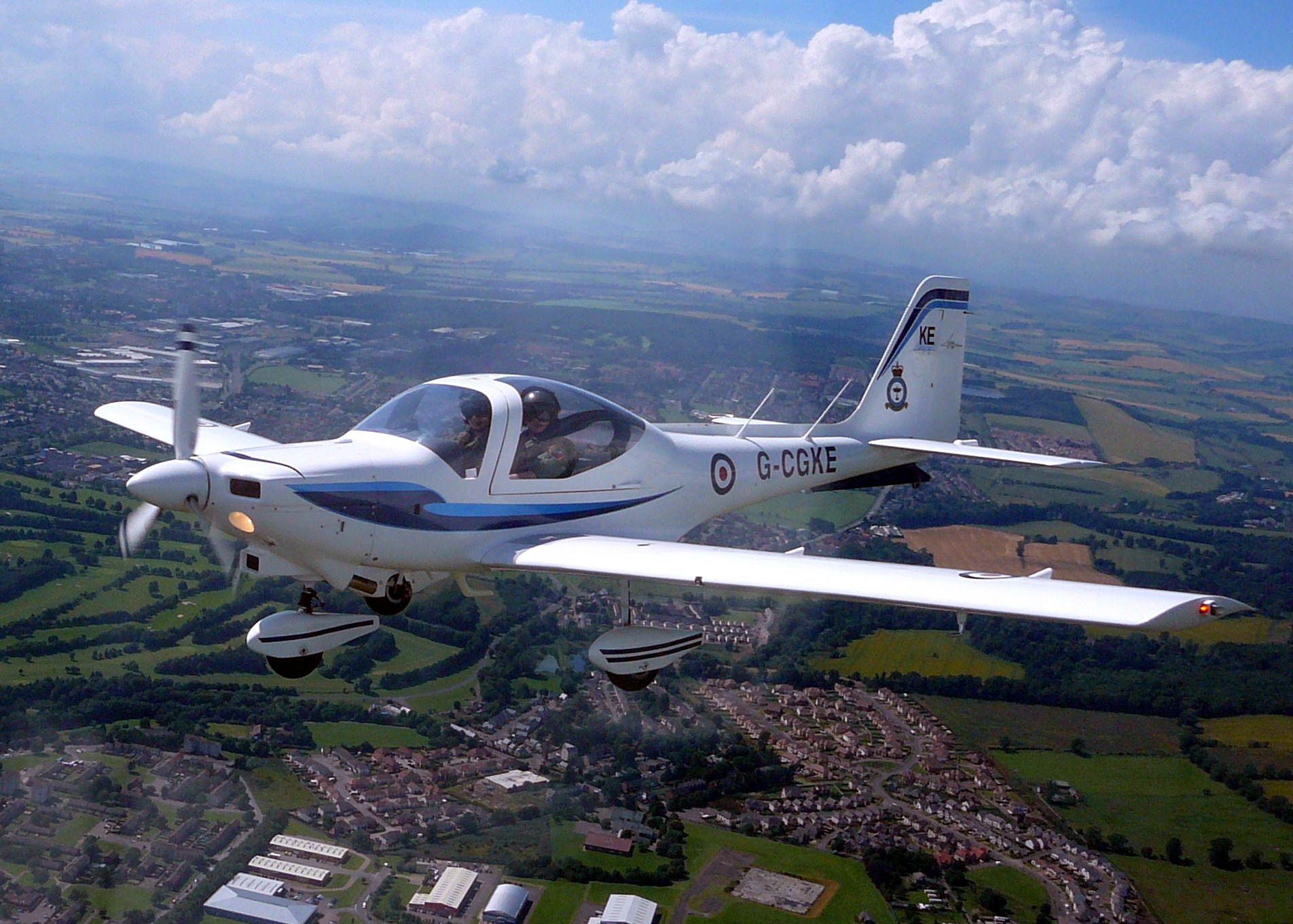
- Grob Tutor aircraft similar to that flown by 2 AEF
- Active: 8 September 1958 - Present
- Country: United Kingdom
- Allegiance: Royal Air Force
- Branch: Air Cadet Organisation
- Role: Training
- Part of: No. 6 Flying Training School RAF
- Garrison/HQ: MoD Boscombe Down

Aircraft flown
- Trainer: Grob Tutor T.1

No. 2 Air Experience Flight (2 AEF) is one of thirteen Air Experience Flights (AEFs) run by the Air Cadet Organisation of the Royal Air Force. The primary purpose of the AEF organisation is to provide air experience to members of the Air Training Corps, Combined Cadet Force (RAF) Section and occasionally, the Girls Venture Corps Air Cadets and the Air Scouts.

== History ==
No. 2 AEF formed on 8 September 1958 at Hamble Aerodrome in Hampshire, equipped with de Havilland Chipmunk T.10 aircraft.

In 1978 it moved to Hurn and in 1996 to MoD Boscombe Down.
