= Air Experience Flight =

An Air Experience Flight (AEF) is a training unit of the Royal Air Force Volunteer Reserve (Training Branch) whose main purpose is to give introductory flying experience to cadets from the Air Training Corps and the Combined Cadet Force. As of 2019, thirteen AEFs are active.

== History ==
The AEFs, numbered from 1 to 13, were formed across the United Kingdom in 1958, all but two forming on the same day, 8 September. All were equipped with the de Havilland Canada DHC-1 Chipmunk T.10 trainer. An exception was No. 5 AEF, which also operated a single Beagle Husky (XW635) from 1969 to 1989.

In the mid-1990s they were merged with co-located University Air Squadrons (UASs), the Chipmunks being replaced by the existing UAS Scottish Aviation Bulldog T.1s. No. 13 AEF at RAF Aldergrove was disbanded in 1996. In 1999, the Grob Tutor T.1 began to replace the Bulldog.

On 10 March 2016, Julian Brazier, Parliamentary Under-Secretary (Ministry of Defence), announced the return of 13 AEF and a new 14 AEF.

== Role and operations ==
The Royal Air Force (RAF) Air Experience Flights (AEF) are co-located with University Air Squadron (UAS) units; the co-located AEF and UAS units pool resources and share aircraft. Air Experience Flights provide basic flying experience, and aerobatics to eligible members of Royal Air Force Air Cadets (RAFAC), otherwise known as the Air Training Corps (ATC), along with the RAF section of the Combined Cadet Force (CCF-RAF), and other air-minded youth groups such as Air Scouts and the Girls Venture Corps Air Cadets (GVC-AC).

When two separate AEFs are co-located at the same airfield, such as No. 9 Air Experience Flight ( 9AEF) and No. 11 Air Experience Flight (11 AEF) at RAF Leeming, the two individual AEFs share the same fleet of aircraft. Just like the University Air Squadrons, all Air Experience Flights are currently commanded by No. 6 Flying Training School RAF (6 FTS).

== Current flights ==
- No. 1 Air Experience Flight RAF – MoD St Athan
- No. 2 Air Experience Flight RAF – MoD Boscombe Down
- No. 3 Air Experience Flight RAF – MoD Boscombe Down
- No. 4 Air Experience Flight RAF – Glasgow Airport
- No. 5 Air Experience Flight RAF – RAF Wittering
- No. 6 Air Experience Flight RAF – RAF Benson
- No. 7 Air Experience Flight RAF – RAF Cranwell
- No. 8 Air Experience Flight RAF – RAF Cosford
- No. 9 Air Experience Flight RAF – RAF Leeming
- No. 10 Air Experience Flight RAF – RAF Woodvale
- No. 11 Air Experience Flight RAF – RAF Leeming
- No. 12 Air Experience Flight RAF – Leuchars Station
- No. 13 Air Experience Flight RAF – Aldergrove Flying Station

== Aircraft ==
Aircraft	In fleet	Order	Notes
Grob Tutor T.1	88	0	RAF "Tutor" designation with flight stick instead of yoke.

Previously operated:

- Scottish Aviation Bulldog T.1
- Beagle Husky
- de Havilland Canada DHC-1 Chipmunk T.10
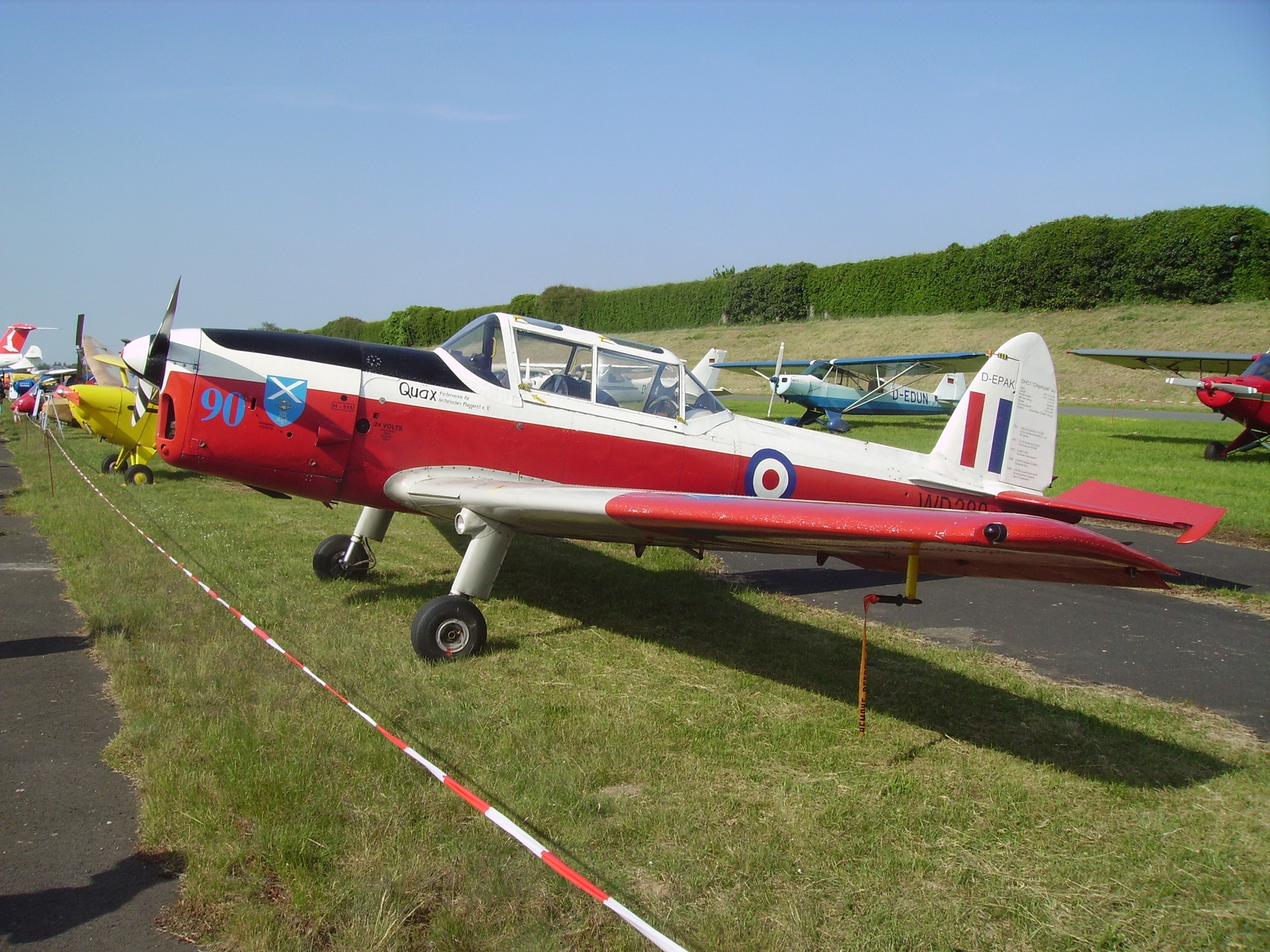
Chipmunk T.10 in RAF colours

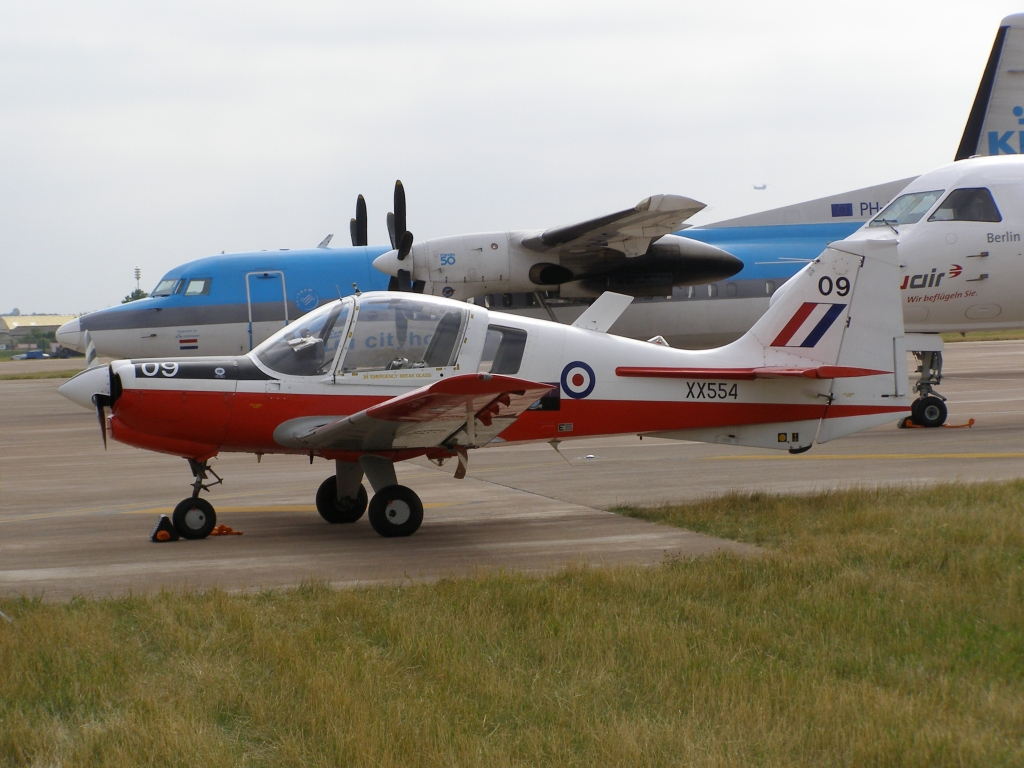
Bulldog T.1 in RAF colours

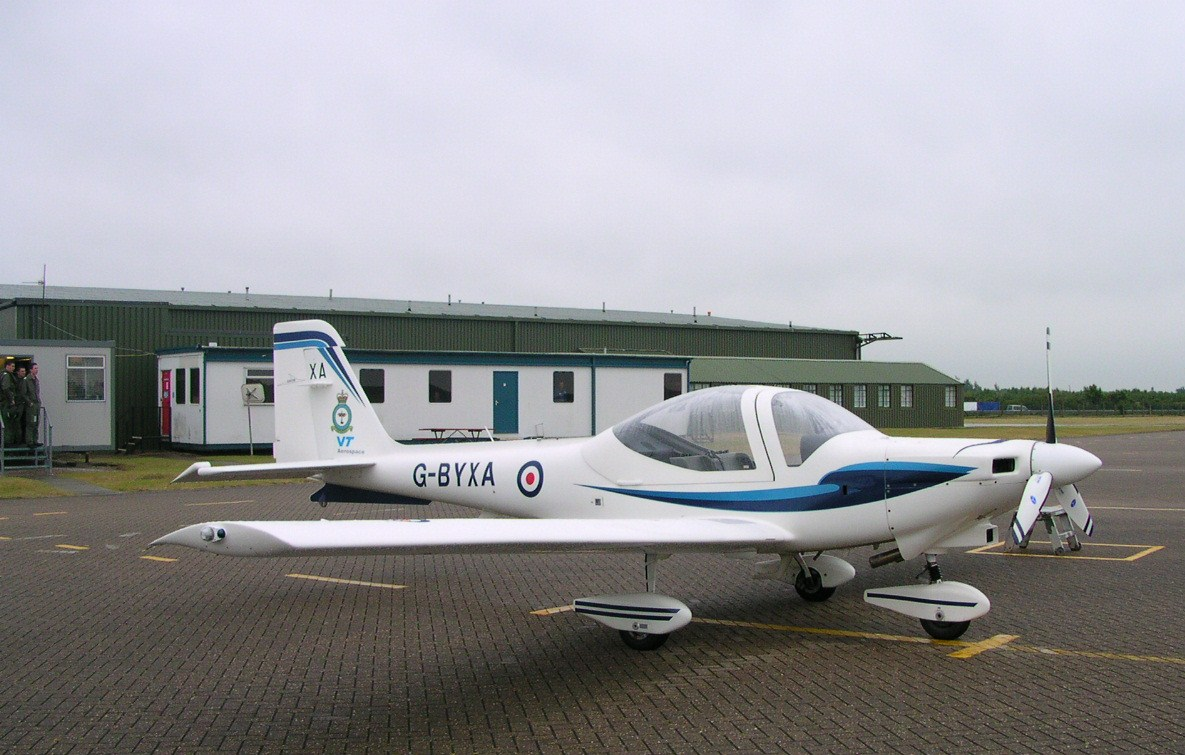
10 AEF Grob Tutor and hangar at RAF Woodvale

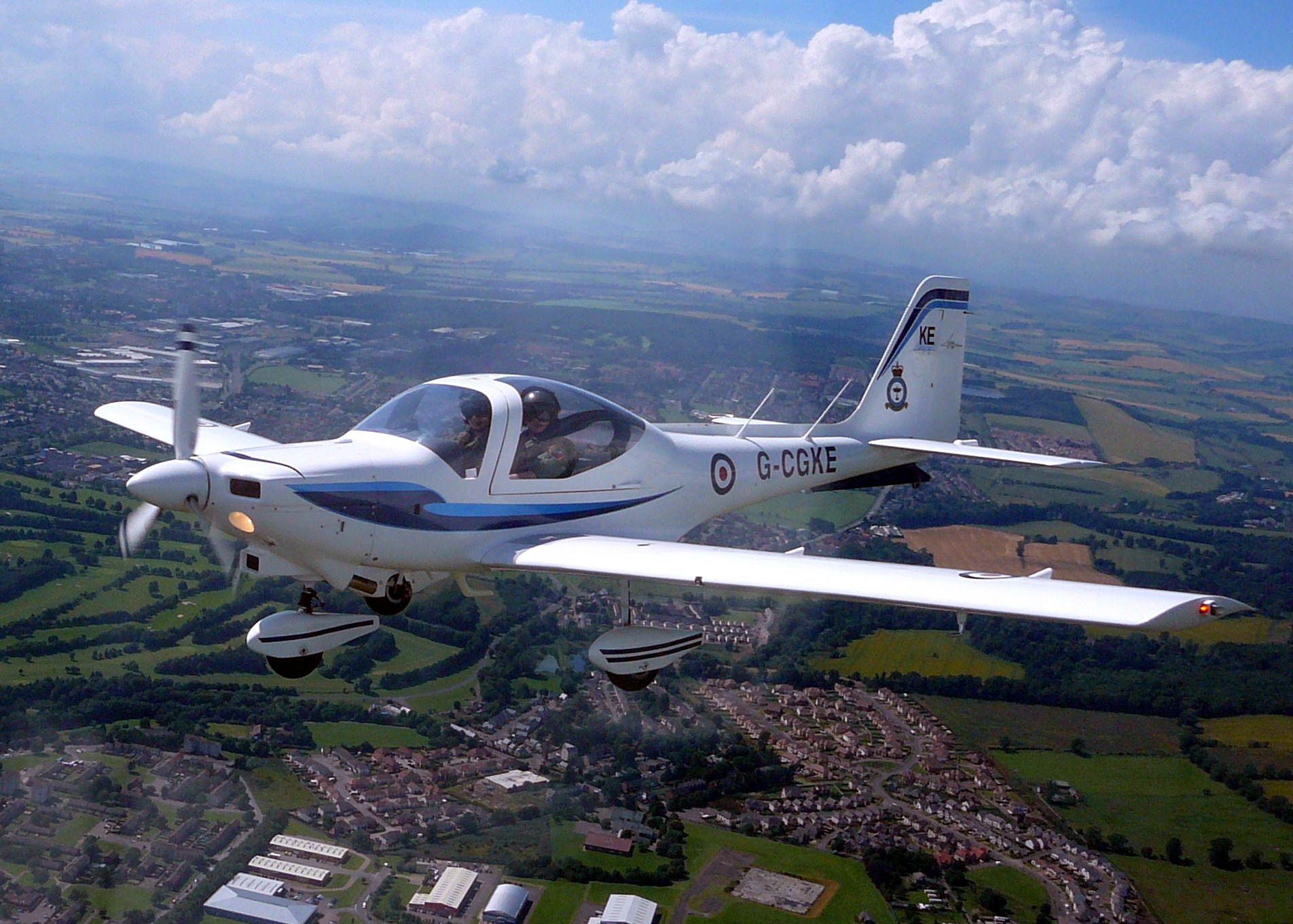
No. 8 Air Experience Flight Grob Tutor in flight
