= International Air Cadet Exchange =

Annual student exchange program

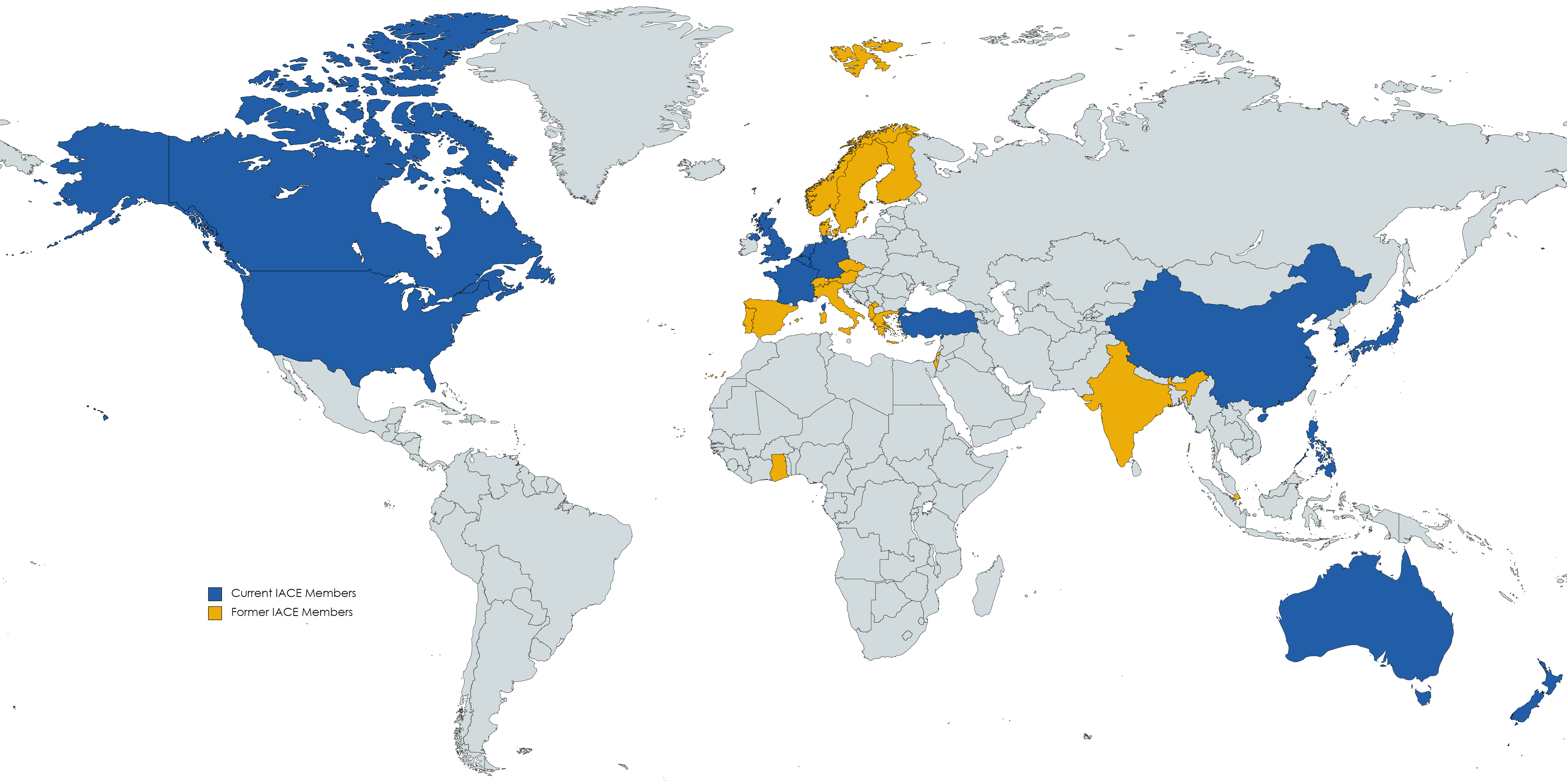
- IACE Official Members 2023 Current and former member nations
- Abbreviation: IACE
- Formation: 11 April 1946
- Legal status: Active
- Purpose: To foster international understanding, goodwill and friendship among young people who have an interest in aviation
- Location: Worldwide
- Fields: Aviation
- Members: 16 Official member Countries (2023)
- President: Squadron Leader Rob Foley (New Zealand)
- Vice President: Hille Vita (Canada)
- Secretary General: Brent Wolfe (Canada)
- Volunteers: 500+ (2017)
- Website: www.iacea.com

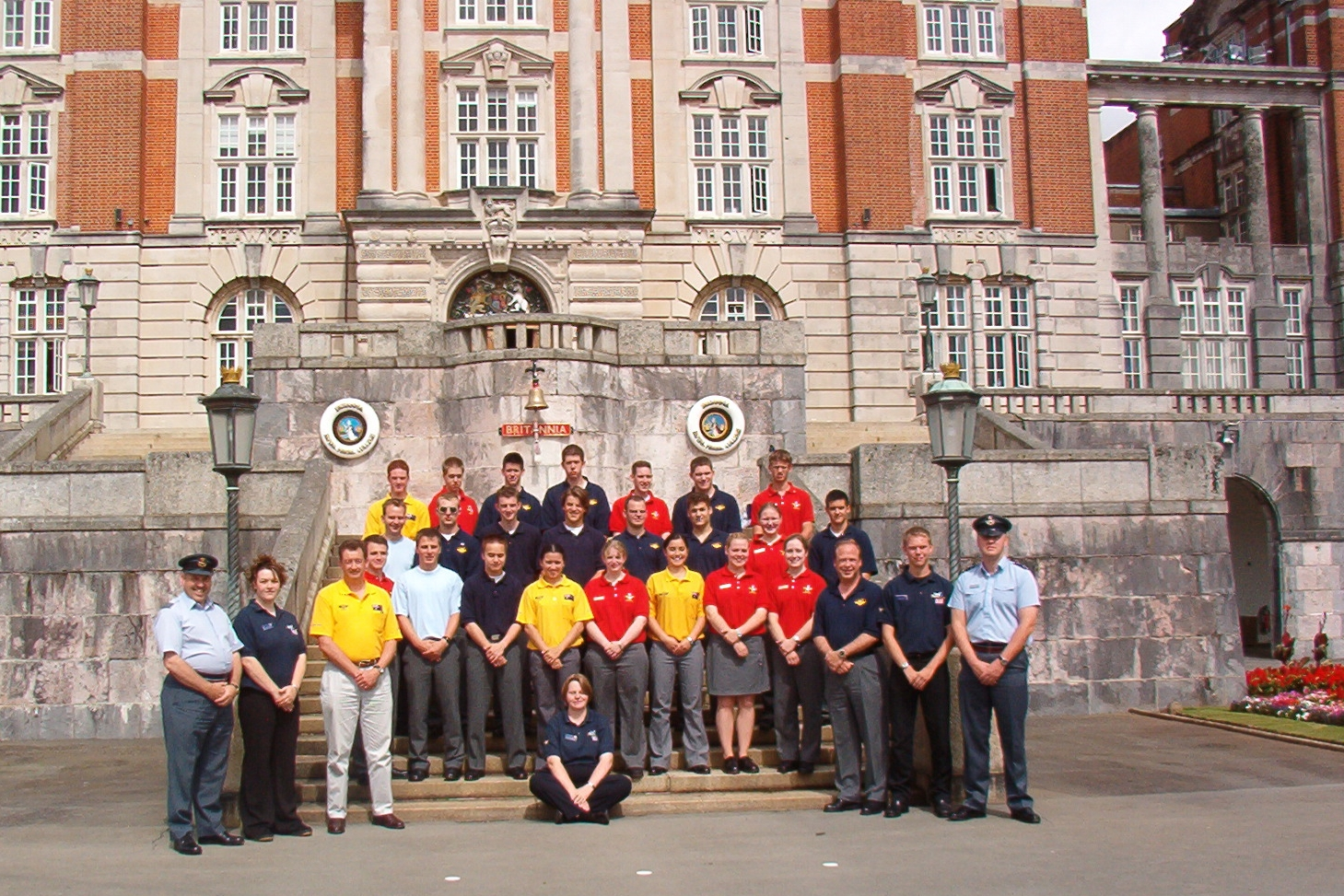
International air cadets at the Britannia Royal Naval College (2003)

The International Air Cadet Exchange is an annual student exchange program designed to promote character, good-will, and cooperation among the world's civilian auxiliary aviation programs.

Participants come from organizations such as the Royal Air Force Air Cadets, Girls Venture Corps Air Cadets, Civil Air Patrol, German Society for Aeronautics and Astronautics, Royal Canadian Air Cadets, Turkish Aeronautical Association, Hong Kong Air Cadet Corps, Singapore National Cadet Corps, along with equivalent groups in other nations.

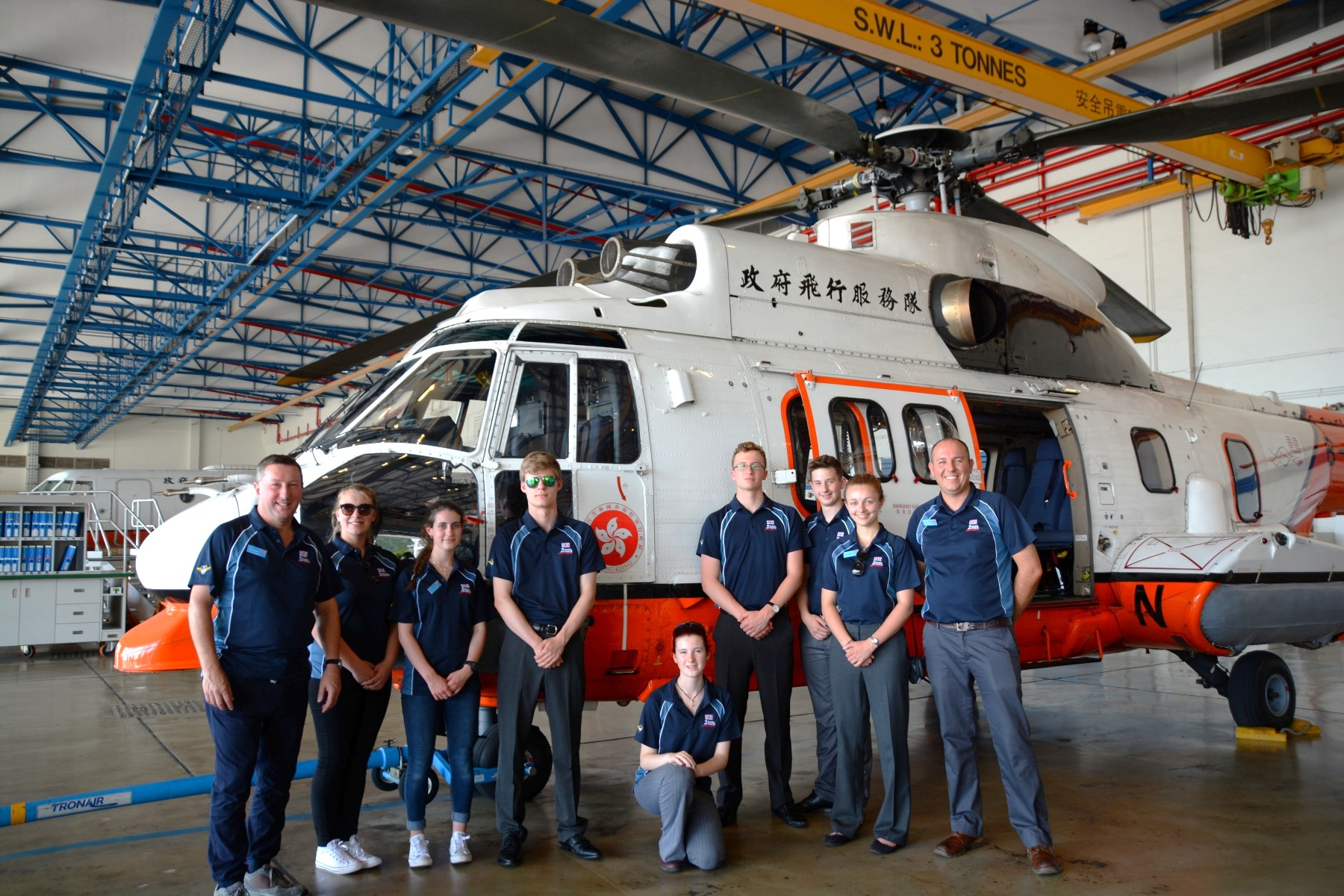
UK IACE Delegates visiting the Government Flying Service in 2016

== Exchange Format ==
Cadets spend approximately two weeks every July/August with their foreign counterparts. The first exchange occurred in 1947 between the United Kingdom and Canada.

During the exchange, cadets are provided housing by volunteer families and on military installations in their host nation. Scheduled activities vary depending on the host nation, but often include tours of famous landmarks and cultural institutions, tours of local aviation facilities or factories, lectures with local aviation figures and visits to military units. Financially, each nation is responsible for its own cadets, and often comes from governments, civilian aviation enthusiasts, or aerospace industry.

According to its mission statement, the Exchange exists to promote more than a love of aviation. Character development is equally important. Cadets develop a better perspective on the challenges other countries face. The friendships they make through the Exchange help the world combat hatred and intolerance. Through the Exchange, cadets grow to understand and appreciate the roles different nations play in aerospace, as well as build international understanding, goodwill, and friendship among young people who have a common interest in aviation.

== Official Members List ==
As it is generally agreed that expansion of the Air Cadet Exchange Programme is desirable, invitations are regularly extended to additional countries. As a result, there has been a gradual expansion in the number of participating countries. Currently, membership fluctuates annually based on each country’s ability to participate.

Each member organisation is responsible for the exchange costs in its own country and for transporting their cadets and escorts to and from the host country or assembly point. Based on the value and importance governments attach to the IACE programme, military air transportation is frequently provided although some countries transport their cadets and escorts by civil aircraft, and others by ground transportation.

- Australia Australian Air Force Cadets
- Belgium German Society for Aeronautics and Astronautics
- Canada Royal Canadian Air Cadets
- China
- France Aéro-Club de France
- Germany German Society for Aeronautics and Astronautics
- Hong Kong Hong Kong Air Cadet Corps
- Japan
- Luxembourg
- Netherlands
- New Zealand New Zealand Air Training Corps
- Philippines Philippine Military Academy
- South Korea
- Turkey Turkish Aeronautical Association
- United Kingdom Royal Air Force Air Cadets
- United States of America Civil Air Patrol

== Past exchange locations ==
- Albania
- Austria
- Czech Republic
- Denmark
- Finland
- Ghana
- Greece
- India
- Israel
- Italy
- Kosovo
- Norway
- Peru
- Portugal
- Singapore
- Spain
- Sweden
- Switzerland

== Australian Participants ==
The AAFC exchanges with the following countries – United States, Canada, United Kingdom, Hong Kong, Singapore, New Zealand, France, South Korea, Turkey and the Netherlands.

Each year up to 35 cadets and instructors (escorts) are selected to represent the AAFC on various overseas visits. The people chosen act as ambassadors for Australia and the AAFC. Once exchange members are met at the designated entry city, they are the guests of the host organisation which will provide all accommodation, food and travel during the course of the program. The itinerary will give visitors the experience of places and cultural events not usually available to ordinary tourists.

Australia also hosts a reciprocal visit each year from the air cadet organisations AAFC visited. HQAAFC organises the event and, in addition to the visitors, a cadet from each of the other Wings is selected to attend. These tours include visits to such places as the city of Canberra, ADFA, Australian War Memorial, Australia Zoo, Gold Coast, Brisbane, Blue Mountains, Sydney Harbour, and local defence bases (which often include the opportunity to fly in Service Aircraft).

== US Participants ==
CAP Cadets who attend IACE are awarded this ribbon

IACE is a National Cadet Special Activity of the Civil Air Patrol. The activity is an opportunity for two weeks of international travel to countries around the world and meet cadets of other cadet aerospace organizations. A CAP Cadet must have a minimum grade of Cadet Captain (Amelia Earhart award) to apply for IACE. CAP, the U.S. Air Force, and the host country cover the cost of meals, lodging, and airfare. Each participant is responsible for the cost of parts of his/her IACE uniform, an activity fee, and other incidentals.
