= Royal Air Force Volunteer Reserve (Training Branch) =

Former reserve element of the RAF

The Royal Air Force Volunteer Reserve (Training Branch), often abbreviated to RAFVR(T), is a Volunteer Reserve element of the Royal Air Force specifically appointed in a cadet training role within the Royal Air Force Volunteer Reserve. Members of the RAFVR(T) have no call-up liability and is now significantly smaller due to the introduction of the Cadet Forces Commission (see below). The commission is now exclusively used for members of the Air Experience Flights, which provide flight experience for the Royal Air Force Air Cadets, as their role requires them to fall under the Armed Forces Act.

In December 2017, the Air Force Board determined that RAFVR(T) ranks as part of the Royal Air Force Air Cadets would be removed, with the exception of the Officers of the Air Experience Flights. This was to make way for the introduction within all MOD-sponsored cadet forces of the Cadet Forces Commission (CFC), which was introduced in 2017 and restated in 2018.

== Recruitment and selection ==
=== Initial selection ===
The majority of the pilots who staff the Air Experience Flights (AEF) are former regular service aircrew (RAF, Army or RN), some of them at Air rank serving as supernumerary Flying Officers RAFVR(T); adding much to the wealth and professional experience of the Air Cadet organisation. A few commercial and airline pilots are selected by recommendation. Those with previous military service are not required to undergo selection at the Officer and Aircrew Selection Centre (OASC).

Unlike the formal process for regular service, selection is based upon relevant experience and the arm in which the candidate initially wants to serve. This interview is usually chaired by the OC Wing who holds the rank of Wing Commander in the RAF Air Cadets. Others present at the filter interview may include the Wing Executive Officer who is nowadays a civil servant that may also hold the rank of Squadron Leader RAFAC, and one or more Wing Staff Officers in the rank of Squadron Leader/Flight Lieutenant RAFAC.

=== Assessment ===
The OASC assessment lasts for two days and consists of the following assessments. However, the OASC conducted by RAFVR(T) and RAFAC applicants is shorter, focusing on elements of the Air Cadet Organisation.

1. Group Discussion: Candidates will be assessed on their participation in a group discussion covering a number of contemporary issues.
2. Group Planning Exercise: Candidates will be assessed on their contribution to a classroom based group planning exercise requiring them to solve a theoretical scenario-based problem.
3. Hangar Familiarisation: Candidates will be given an unassessed introduction to the OASC hangar where they will complete a series of physical leadership tasks.
4. Leaderless Exercise: Candidates will be assessed on their contribution to a practical exercise as a group in the OASC hangar, without a nominated leader.
5. Command Situation Exercise: Each candidate will be given the opportunity to lead the other members of their syndicate in tackling a practical exercise in the OASC hangar. Candidates will be assessed as both leaders and team members.
6. Individual Planning Exercise: Candidates will be assessed in a classroom-based individual planning exercise requiring them to solve a theoretical scenario-based problem as individuals.
7. Interview: Candidates will be interviewed individually by a board of senior officers, including a senior member of the ACO. This will determine their motivation, suitability and understanding of the ACO and its parent service.

=== Officer Cadets ===
Candidates who passed the OASC boarding process were appointed as Officer Cadets in the VR(T). Candidates joining a Combined Cadet Force unit were recommended by the relevant headmaster and Section Commander to Headquarters Air Cadets before being interviewed by the Regional TEST Squadron Leader serving in the RAFR. Since October 2007, all candidates that passed their relative selection process were appointed as Officer Cadets until successful completion of the Officers' Initial Course (OIC) at RAF Cranwell.

As an Officer Cadet VR(T), they wore a completely white rank slide with gilt VRT insignia in the centre. This was accompanied by standard officers' headdress (complete with white band whilst at ATF). Following completion of their OIC, a newly appointed Pilot Officer Air Cadets would then receive their rank slide. Since Air Cadets officers would generally be responsible for running either a CCF(RAF) section or an Air Training Corps squadron/detached flight, successful applicants were required to demonstrate qualities of commitment, motivation, and some knowledge of the RAF and military/civil aviation, all underpinned by a willingness and aptitude to work with young people in an instructional environment. Many had educational or youth work experience and qualifications in specialist areas of outward bound youth work.

Other members of the Air Cadets served as flying instructors on the Volunteer Gliding Squadrons or as pilots on Air Experience Flights; the latter were in most cases former military pilots who have left the regular service and were commissioned into the RAFVR(T) on appointment to the AEF.

== Uniform ==
Air Cadets members wear the same uniform as Royal Air Force commissioned Officers, with the exception that gilt VRT insignia is worn on the lapels of formal dress uniforms, and gilt VRT insignia on top of the rank braid on the epaulettes and tabs of working dress uniforms and combat uniforms. Air Cadets Officers are required to still wear gilt VRT badges on top of rank braid when wearing No.2 dress uniform (or other working dress) at all times (excepting those in the CCF who are not permitted under Joint Service Regulations (JSP 313) to wear metal titles on combat uniform). However, when there is a FOD (Foreign object debris) risk the entire rank badge should be removed.

=== Flying badges ===
Similar to pilots in the regular RAF, those in the RAFVR are given their own unique flying badges based on the nature of their flying.

- Air Experience Pilots wear a badge styled on the RAF Pilot badge, but with blue swift's wings instead of white, and the central lettering 'RAF' is replaced with 'VR' for Volunteer Reserve.
- Glider Pilot badges are also near identical, though with a blue laurel wreath surrounding the letter 'G' for glider.

== Training ==
All RAFAC officers are required to attend and pass the Officers' Initial Course (OIC) held at the Adult Training Facility (ATF), a lodger unit at RAF Cranwell in Lincolnshire, usually within the first 12 months of their appointment. This week-long course covers the basic roles and responsibilities of an RAFAC Officer and very few fail the course. Those completing the course are awarded a Cadet Forces Commission. A second 1-week course at the ATF, the Squadron Commanders' Course, is required for those seeking to command an Air Cadets squadron.

Air Cadets officers involved in RAFAC units may undertake extra training before becoming appointed as an Officer Commanding of their unit, although this training is not compulsory for officers associated with the CCF. Some also take specialist training for certain activities: physical training (PT) or shooting, for example.

They are supported at RAFAC unit level by fellow Air Cadets officers, as well as uniformed RAFAC Warrant Officers and Non-Commissioned Officers and a cadre of Civilian Instructors. Although not in the chain of command, the wings are supported by a Wing Executive Officer of Sqn Ldr Rank in the RAFR. At CCF(RAF) contingents, Air Cadets officers are able to call upon the support of the regular RAF Squadron Leader tasked with looking after their area, and also upon the services of the regular RAF 'TEST' sergeants mapped to their specific school. Volunteer Gliding Squadron (VGS) and Air Experience Flight (AEF) officers are supported directly by HQ Air Cadet Staff, and the unit's parent RAF station.

== Ranks ==
RAFVR(T) Ranks
Commissioned Officer Ranks	Insignia	Notes
Officer Cadet (Off Cdt)		Officer Cadet – NOTE: The rank VRT badge is no longer used and is replaced with a gilt badge stating "AIR CADETS" for Air Cadet Staff on the Officers’ Initial Course.
Pilot Officer (Plt Off)		Junior Officer – Usually a bespokely commissioned AEF pilot without previous military service.
Flying Officer (Fg Off)		Junior Officer – Pilots attached to the Air Experience Flights are typically commissioned into the RAFVRT at Fg Off rank. Promotion to Fg Off is automatic on completion of two years' service in the RAFVR(T) for those without previous Military service.
Flight Lieutenant (Flt Lt)		Junior Officer – Senior AEF pilots and Adjutants are usually appointed at Flt Lt rank in the VR(T). However, OC AEF's are typically FTRS billets, and as such are commissioned into the RAFR. Promotion to Flt Lt is automatic after 9 years of service as a Fg Off.
Squadron Leader (Sqn Ldr)		First Senior Officer Rank – Usually serves as the OC of a large Volunteer Gliding Squadron or as an ATC Wing Staff Officer.
Wing Commander (Wg Cdr)		Senior Officer Rank – Often serves as the commanding officer of an ATC wing, Regional Staff Officer (conditional to position), Corps Staff Officer (CSO) posts (e.g. the Corps D of E Officer).
Group Captain (Gp Capt)		Most Senior Rank – NOTE: The gilt VRT badge is no longer used and is replaced with a gilt badge stating "AIR CADETS"

== Notable members ==
- Sir Patrick Moore – joined the RAFVR(T) post-World War II, reaching the rank of Squadron Leader

== See also ==
- Air Cadet Organisation
  - Air Training Corps
  - Combined Cadet Force
- Air Experience Flight
- Volunteer Gliding Squadrons
