= Girls Venture Corps Air Cadets =

Voluntary uniformed youth organisation in the United Kingdom

- The Girls Venture Corps flag
- Active: 1940–2023 (Note: As a national organisation and charity. Individual units continue to operate as independent charities.)
- Role: Volunteer Youth Organisation
- Headquarters: Sheffield
- Patron: Princess Alexandra

Commanders
- Final Corps Commandant: Yvonne McCarthy

The Girls Venture Corps Air Cadets (GVCAC) was a national voluntary uniformed youth organisation in the United Kingdom for girls aged between 11 and 20. It was a registered charity, and a member of The National Council for Voluntary Youth Services (NCVYS). the Corps Commandant was Yvonne McCarthy. The GVCAC received no funding from the Ministry of Defence (MoD). All adult staff members were subject to DBS checks. In 2022, the national organisation was disbanded, with the individual units continuing as independent charities.

== History ==
The GVC was founded in 1940 as part of the National Association of Training Corps for Girls. This umbrella organisation was responsible for the Girls' Training Corps (GTC), Girls' Nautical Training Corps (GNTC) and Women's Junior Air Corps (WJAC).

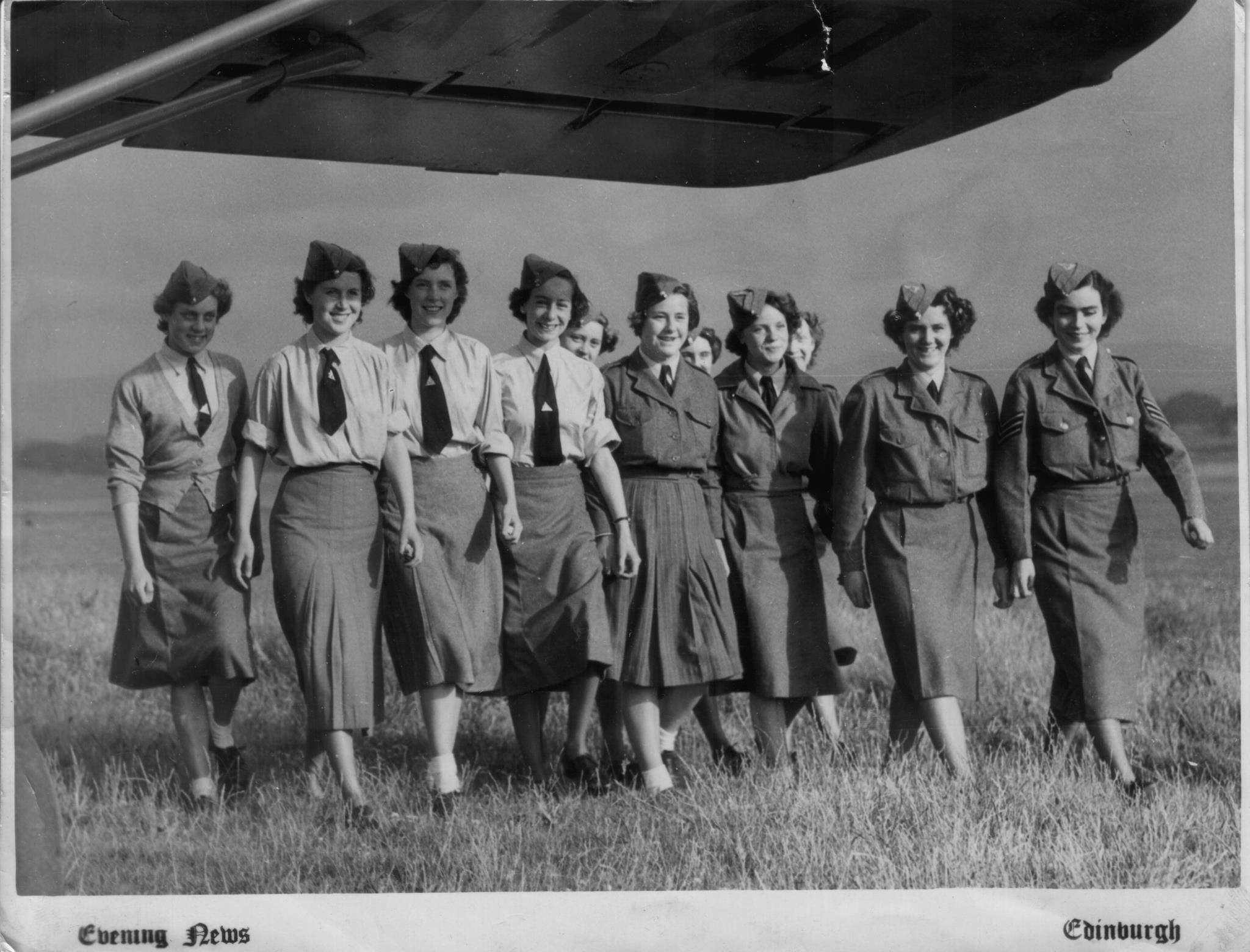
Edinburgh based WJAC members in the 1950s.

=== First woman to break sound barrier ===
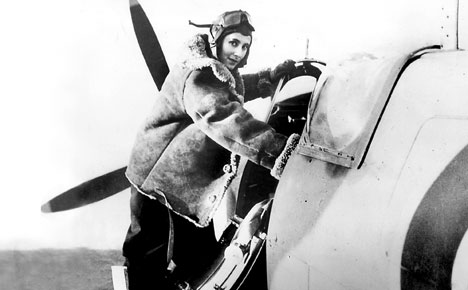
Diana Barnato Walker climbing into the cockpit of a Spitfire whilst serving with the Air Transport Auxiliary

Former Air Transport Auxiliary pilot, Diana Barnato Walker, became a pilot for the Women's Junior Air Corps (WJAC) shortly after the war, giving cadets training and air-experience flights to air-minded teenage girls to encourage them to enter the aviation industry. In July 1948, an aircraft that she was flying caught fire near White Waltham. Rather than bail out and lose the WJAC's aircraft, she switched off the fuel and glided the aircraft back. In 1963 she undertook a flight in an English Electric Lightning, attaining 1,262 mph (Mach 1.65) in a two-seat T.4 trainer and thus became the first British woman to exceed the speed of sound.

=== Girls Venture Corps ===
In 1964, the Girls Venture Corps replaced the GTC and WJAC. The previous year, the Girls' Nautical Training Corps became more closely involved with the Sea Cadet Corps and in 1980 became an integral part of the Sea Cadets and ceased to be a separate organisation. The Girls Venture Corps had two wings corresponding to the former GTC and WJAC; it was common at this time for former GTC units to share premises with Army Cadet Force units and for former WJAC units to share premises with Air Training Corps units. In 1983, girls were admitted to the ACF and ATC, prompting many GVC cadets to transfer to their respective counterparts. It was decided that the GVC would focus on air activities and in 1987, at the request of its membership, the organisation was renamed the Girls Venture Corps Air Cadets.

In 2022, the national organisation was disbanded, the charity was deregistered in 2023, and the individual units continue as independent charities.

== Activities ==
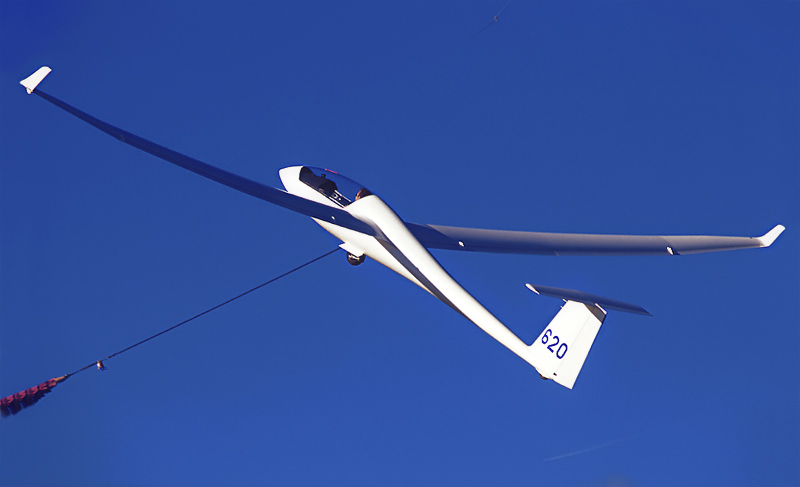
Gliding

=== Duke of Edinburgh Award ===
The Duke of Edinburgh's Award Scheme is a voluntary, non-competitive programme of practical, cultural, and adventurous activities for young people aged 14 to 25. The Award programme has three levels, Bronze, Silver, and Gold, and Cadets are often encouraged to achieve these awards as they progress through their cadet careers. The Award is widely recognised by employers as it helps demonstrate that holders are keen to take on new challenges, have a higher level of self-confidence than their counterparts, and have leadership qualities with experience of teamwork.

Until 2008, some cadets aged 16 or over participated in the Duke of Edinburgh's Millennium Volunteers Award.

=== Aviation awards ===
There is an opportunity for all Cadets to undertake practical gliding and powered flying, underpinned by training courses in aviation subjects.

- Air Discovery (from age 11 onwards)
  - Basic study and practical experiments
- Air Ability (ages 12–13) provides an introduction to:
  - Air Traffic Control
  - Weather
  - Engines
  - Flight and Navigation Theory
- Air Proficiency (age 13+)
  - Air Traffic Control & Radio
  - Meteorology
  - Air Navigation
  - Propulsion & Theory of Flight
- Air Brevet

To gain this qualification, a single specialist subject is studied:

- Aeronautical Engineering (Engines)
- Air Navigation

=== Challenge Award ===
The Challenge Award has drill and etiquette, service to the community, life skills, outdoor/adventure activities, interests/skills, and physical recreation sections.

==== Drill and etiquette ====
The GVCAC, as a uniformed youth organization, sets itself and its members very high standards, including dress and behaviour. Drill (marching) is a vital part of encouraging teamwork, discipline, co-operation and self-confidence. Drill practice is a means of instilling discipline and teamwork; it is also used in formal parades, for moving around military bases, and for moving cadets in a smart and orderly fashion. The Corps instills good manners and customs (etiquette) into cadets' behaviours; this transfers into having respect for each other, their family and is often well received by prospective employers.

=== Other activities ===
GVCAC Cadets can also take part in the International Air Cadet Exchange (I.A.C.E), and Nijmegen Marches.

GVCAC units could become affiliated with RAF Stations, which would support them in activities.

== Flying and Gliding Scholarships ==
=== RAFA Flying Scholarship ===
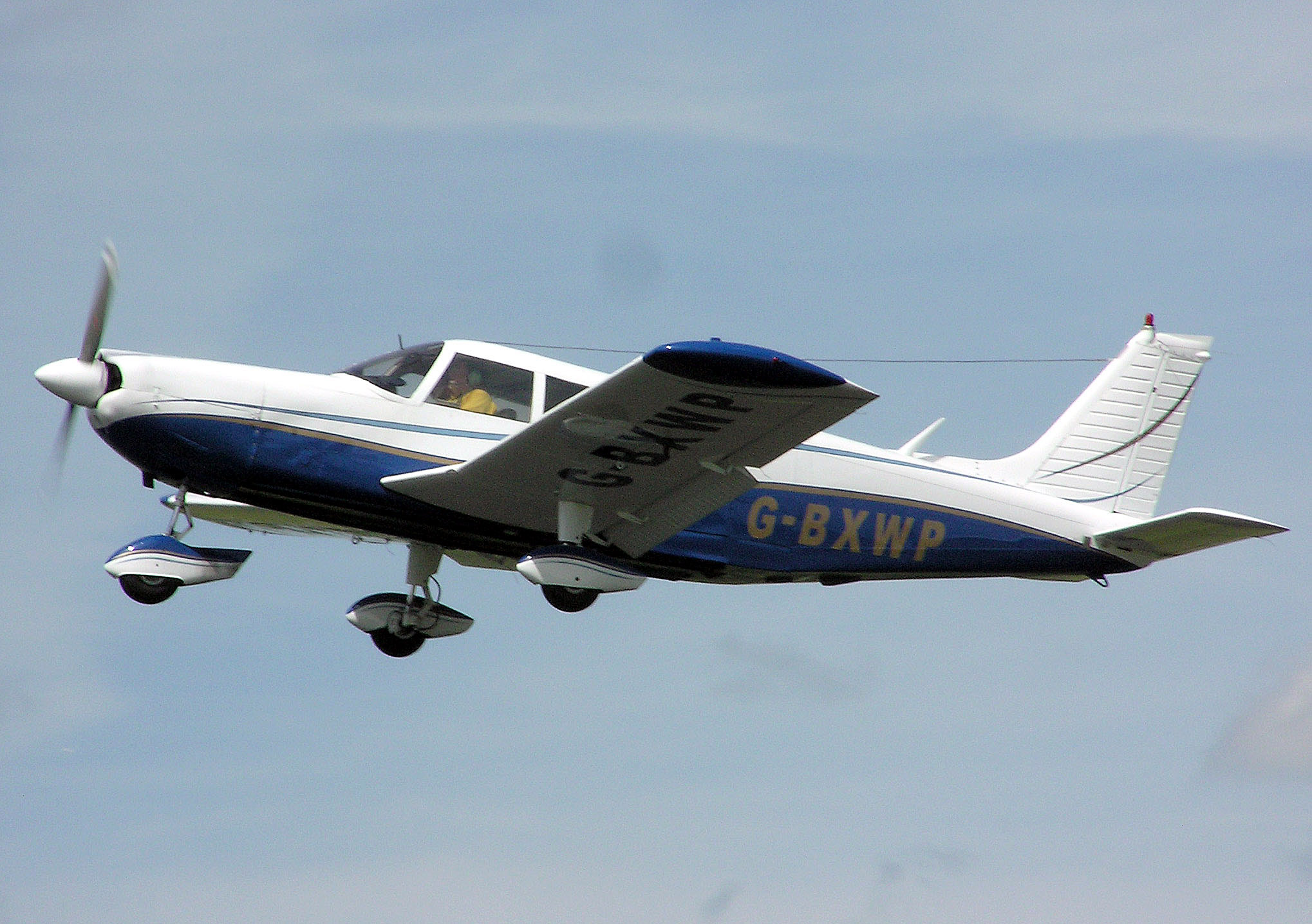
Piper PA-32-300 Cherokee Six at Kemble Airfield, Gloucestershire

The Royal Air Force Association each year invites applications from both the ATC and GVCAC for a limited number of flying scholarships.

=== Ducat-Amos Gliding Scholarships ===
In 2007, six grants were awarded to GVCAC Cadets, enabling them to attend a weekend course at a local gliding club. The scholarships were named after Air Commandant Barbara Ducat-Amos CB RRC (1921–2008), Director of the Royal Air Force Nursing Service.

== Structure ==
The headquarters were in Tinsley, South Yorkshire, east of the Tinsley Viaduct at junction 34 of the M1 motorway, off the Tinsley Roundabout at the start of the A631. The Meadowhall Centre is located to the west of the location.

== Ranks ==
=== Cadet ranks ===
In addition to learning new skills by working through the GVCAC syllabus, experienced cadets can be awarded a rank. The GVCAC allowed its cadets to take on responsibility and leadership as non-commissioned Officers or NCOs.

Girls Venture Corps Air Cadets
Girls Venture Corps Air Cadets	Officer cadet	Cadet unit sergeant	Cadet sergeant	Cadet corporal	Cadet lance corporal	Leading cadet	Cadet	Recruit
Girls Venture Corps Air Cadets	OFFCDT	CDTUSGT	CDTSGT	CDTCPL	CDTLC	LCDT	CDT	RCT

=== Staff ranks ===
Insignia						
Rank	Honorary Corps Commandant	Senior Officer	Unit Officer	Assistant Unit Officer	Section Officer	Potential/Acting Section Officer

== Uniform ==
- Unit
  - Cap
  - Black tie
  - Blue shirt
  - Blue RAF jumper
  - Brassard
  - Lightweight green trousers
  - Black shoes
  - Stable belt

- Formal (As above but with)
  - RAF skirt
- Camp uniform
  - Blue shirt or polo shirt
  - Navy blue sweatshirt
  - Lightweight green trousers
  - Black trainers

== Unit locations ==
Region 1	Region 7	Region 9	Region 11	Region 12	Region 18	Region 25
South Shields (Tyne & Wear)	Huntingdon (Cambridgeshire)	Culver (Isle of Wight)	RAF Marham (King's Lynn, Norfolk)	Feltham (Middlesex)	Hednesford (Staffordshire)	Ollerton (Nottinghamshire)
Gateshead (Tyne & Wear)	St Ives (Cambridgeshire)	Ryde (Isle of Wight)	King's Lynn (Norfolk)	Greenford (Middlesex)	Smethwick (Oldbury, West Midlands)	Rotherham (South Yorkshire)
	Wisbech (Cambridgeshire)	Newport (temporarily Closed)		Southend (Leigh on Sea, Essex)	Stafford (Staffordshire)	Sheffield (South Yorkshire)
	Yaxley (Cambridgeshire)				Walsall (West Midlands)	Wigston (Leicestershire)

== See also ==
- Sea Cadet Corps
- Army Cadet Force
- Air Training Corps
- Air Experience Flight
- Pilot licensing in the United Kingdom
