= Royal Air Force Air Cadets =

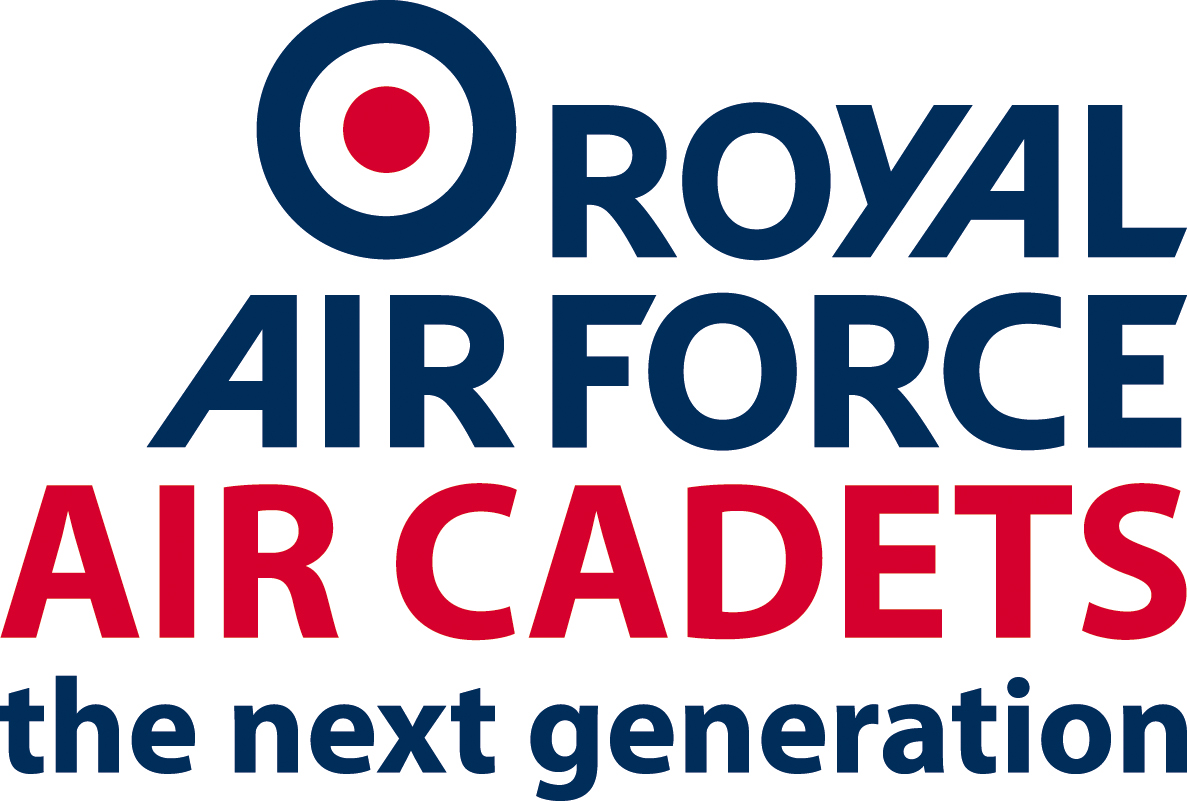
- Active: 5 February 1941 – present
- Country: United Kingdom
- Branch: Royal Air Force (sponsor)
- Type: Volunteer youth organisation
- Role: Youth development; military aviation education and training
- Part of: No. 22 Group RAF
- Headquarters: RAF Cranwell
- Patron: The Princess of Wales
- Motto: the next generation
- Website: www.raf.mod.uk/aircadets/

Commanders
- Commandant Air Cadets: Air Commodore David-Allen 'Al' Lewis
- Warrant Officer: Warrant Officer Alex Corbin
- Honorary Ambassador: Wing Commander Emma Wolstenholme
- National Chair: Mr S.J. Ensor
- National Chaplain: Reverend Gareth Jones

Insignia
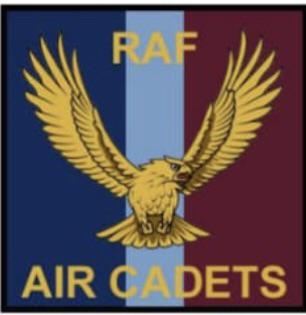
- Tactical recognition flash

Aircraft flown
- Trainer: Tutor T1; Viking T1

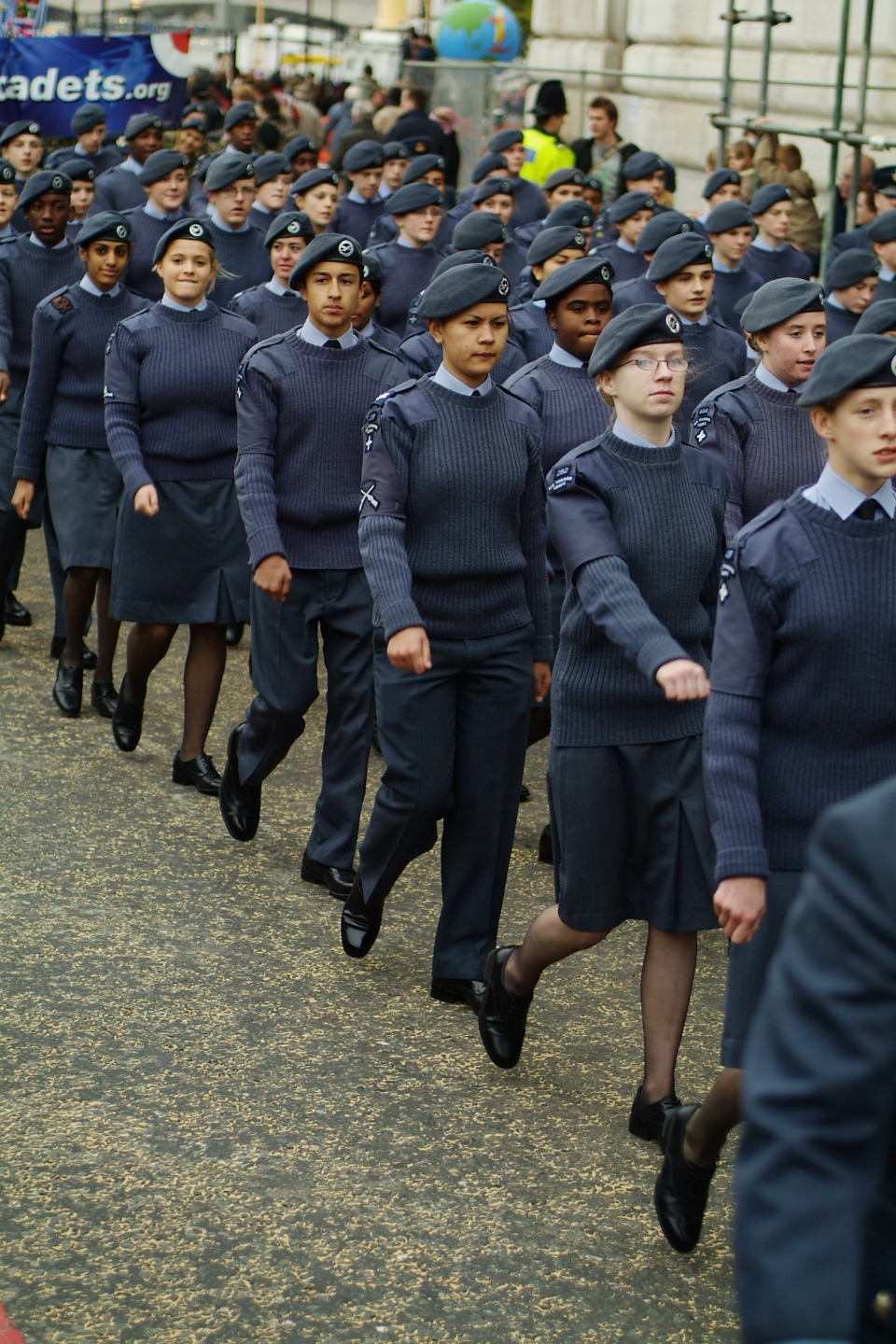
RAF Air Cadets marching in a parade at the Lord Mayor's Show London 2006.

The Royal Air Force Air Cadets (RAFAC) is the name of the organisation in charge of the combined volunteer-military youth organisations sponsored by the Royal Air Force (RAF); which is formed by both the Air Training Corps (ATC), and RAF Sections of the Combined Cadet Force (CCF). The organisation is headed by a serving RAF officer, Commandant Air Cadets. The current commandant is Air Commodore Al Lewis. In addition to the Commandant, who is responsible for the organisation’s uniformed activities, RAFAC also has a National Chair, who serves as the senior representative of the trustee pillar; the incumbent is Mr Stuart J. Ensor OBE.

Prior to 1 October 2017, the RAFAC was called the Air Cadet Organisation. As of 1 April 2023, the RAFAC had a strength of 42,190 cadets and 10,070 Cadet Force Adult Volunteers (CFAVs), along with ~5,000 trustees. Cadets are aged between 12 and 17 years on entry to the organisation, and can remain until they are 18, or with special permission, until they are 20.

== Organisation ==
The Royal Air Force Air Cadets consists of:

- Headquarters RAF Air Cadets (HQRAFAC) at RAF Cranwell, Lincolnshire
- 6 Regions (analogous to Royal Air Force groups)
- 35 Wing Headquarters
- Two National Air Cadet Adventure Training Centres, at Windermere (in the Lake District) and in Wales
- Over 900 Air Training Corps Squadrons in the UK and overseas
- Around 500 RAF contingents of the Combined Cadet Force, administratively managed from 5 CCF regions.

=== Air Training Corps Regions ===
The six regions, and their subordinate wings are:

1. London and South East region (LaSE)
2. South West region (SW)
3. Central and East region (C&E)
4. Wales and West region (W&W)
5. North region
6. Scotland and Northern Ireland region (S&NI)

Each region is commanded by a 'Regional Commandant' (RC), who holds the rank of Group Captain, and is usually a retired regular Royal Air Force Air Officer. The region is additionally staffed by a number of Cadet Forces Adult Volunteers, who maintain the day-to-day operations of each of the regions. Examples of these posts include Region Staff Officer, Region Training Officer, and Region STEM Officer.

=== RAF sections of the Combined Cadet Force ===
RAF sections within the Combined Cadet Force usually follow their own chain of command within their school's unit. Above their school unit, they diverge into a similar chain of command as the Air Training Corps, administratively managed from five CCF regions.

=== Trustee governance ===
In addition to the uniformed command structure, the Air Training Corps squadrons are supported by a parallel trustee pillar, responsible for managing non-public funds, and ensuring lawful governance. Trustees operate at squadron, wing, regional, and national levels. The National Chair, who is the senior representative of the trustee pillar, is Mr Stuart J. Ensor OBE.

== Activities ==
Air Cadet activities vary greatly, but commonly include:

- First aid
- Radio
- NavEx (Navigational Exercise)
- Physical activities
- Drill and discipline
- Band and music
- Camps
- Leadership

There are also less frequent, but enriching, activities; examples include:

- Gliding, at a Volunteer Gliding Squadron
- Flying, Air Experience Flights (on an RAF base)
- RAF base visits
- Shooting
- International trips, such as visits to RAF Akrotiri
- International Air Cadet Exchange, an exchange programme within the cadets of other countries
- The Duke of Edinburgh's Award (Bronze, Silver, and Gold award levels to achieve)

== See also ==
- Royal Air Force Volunteer Reserve (Training Branch) (RAFVR(T))
- Air Experience Flight (AEF)
- Volunteer Gliding Squadrons (VGS)
- Air Defence Cadet Corps (ADCC, 1938–1941)
- Royal Air Force boy entrants
- Air Squadron Trophy Competition
