= Air Scout =

Part of the Scout movement

- Country: Worldwide

Air Scouts are a part of the Scout movement with a particular emphasis on aviation-themed programmes and/or flying-based activities. Air Scouts follow the same basic programme as other Scouts, but they devote certain amounts of time focused on their air activities.

Air Scouts often wear a slightly different uniform from the rest of the Scouting movement and/or may have additional badges/insignia.

Most air activities are ground-based like focusing on aviation-related activities, modelling aeroplanes, aircraft knowledge, and flight techniques. Depending on the age group, country and Scout group, the activities can also include parachuting or flights in light aircraft, helicopters, gliders or hot air balloons.

== History ==
There are claims that Major Baden Fletcher Smyth Baden-Powell, youngest brother of the founder of The Boy Scouts Association of the United Kingdom, Robert Baden-Powell and an aviator, first brought flying-based activities into Scouting. However, as late as July, 1932, Baden Baden-Powell wrote, in the Scouter:

"...it has been suggested that Air Scouts should be organised in the same way as Sea Scouts."

"Though the air is 'ever with us', access to aerodromes is not common and though Sea Scouts can mess about 'in any old boat', a Scout is unlikely to be able to get access to an aeroplane, and even if he did he would not be able to fly it. ...it seems hardly feasible to have special 'Air Scouts', yet a great deal may be accomplished by troops specialising in air-work... I shall always be pleased to give what advice I can."

An Airman's badge was introduced by The Boy Scouts Association in December 1911. However, these did not introduce Air Scouts.

Suggestions to have an Air Scout Branch within The Boy Scouts Association were first put forward in May 1927. They were not accepted for fear the Branch might be 'led away by attractive non-essentials' and there was insufficient manpower in the Movement to maintain it. However, by the late 1930s, Scout Troops in the vicinity of airfields and gliding clubs were encouraged to include air activities in their programmes and an 'Air Patrols' pamphlet was produced. In the Scouter of December 1937, there was an announcement about 'Air Patrols' by L A Impey, Headquarters Commissioner for Scouts:

"From time to time rumours reach me of troops that are co-operating with ground staff at certain aerodromes, but with the exception of the 30th Plymouth Troop, I have received no definite information."

"Let me add here quickly that there is no intention of starting a new branch of Scouting, namely Air Scouts..."

The Boy Scouts Association eventually introduced Air Scouts in 1941.

The 4th World Scout Jamboree in 1933 was the first international gathering where Air Scouts were represented. On 9 August, Robert Baden-Powell visited the Air Scouts, in the company of Pál Teleki, a Hungarian Chief Scout and László Almásy (known as The English Patient), who was a leader of the Hungarian Air Scouts.

== Worldwide ==
=== Austria ===
Austrian scouts were forerunners of Air Scouting in Europe. Air Scouts attended the 4th World Scout Jamboree held in Hungary (1933), in front of the contingent was Robert Kronfeld, prioneering of Austrian gliding and Rover Scout leader from Innsbruck.

=== Australia ===
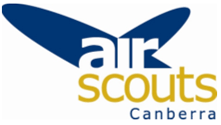
Air Scouts Canberra

Scouts Australia has a few active Air Scout groups. Air Scouts Canberra is located in Deakin, Australian Capital Territory. The Morley Group is currently the only Air Scout Group in Western Australia as of the closing of the Bullsbrook Air Scout Group. There is one Air Scout Group in Victoria, 3rd Chelsea Air Scouts, located in Melbourne bayside suburb of Chelsea. There are also Air Scouts in individual Scout Groups. There is one Air Activities Centre at Camden airport, Sydney, New South Wales. While the group does not include any youth members, there are many adult members.

=== Bangladesh ===
Bangladesh Scouts has an Air Scouts programme and is a branch of Scouting for all scouting sections. Organisationally there is a separate region for Air Scout among its 11 regions There are Air Rover Units in Bangladesh. All Scouting sections in Bangladesh follow the same programme for their section but Air Scouts sections then add an aeronautical flavour to the programme and activities. It is patronized by the Bangladesh Air Force. Every school which is run by the Bangladesh Air Force has an air scout section. There are also some open air scout groups in Bangladesh. Most air activities are ground based like visits to airports and air museums, radio controlled model flight, aero modelling and camping on airfields. The activities can also include parachuting or flights in light aircraft, helicopters, gliders or hot air balloons. That adds an Air Force flavour to the programme.

=== Barbados ===
In March 2014, members of the newly formed 160th Barbados Deighton Griffiths Air Scout Troop where invested by the Chief Commissioner of the Barbados Boy Scout Association at the Barbados Concorde Experience. These are the only Air Scouts in Barbados.

=== Belgium ===
Only one Group exists, which is hosted by a Belgian Paragliding Club.

=== Brazil ===
Brazil and Chile vie for the first officially recorded Air Scout Groups in South America.

União dos Escoteiros do Brasil has an Air Scouting programme for its Air Scouts (Escoteiros do Ar), known in Portuguese as "Modalidade do Ar".

The first Air Scout Group in Brazil, named 'Captain Ricardo Kirk' was founded on 28 April 1938, and hosted by the local Brazilian 5th Army Aviation Regiment in Curitiba, PR which currently operates the Integrated Air Defense and Air Traffic Control Centre. The original founding was initiated by Army Aviator Lt. Col Vasco Alves Secco.

Subsequently, recognising the value of Air Scouting, the Brazilian Ministry of Aviation has issued decrees to all its units to provide support to Air Scout Groups at all its bases, as needed.

Besides the standard activities of Scouting, Air Scouts in Brazil have additional air activities and learn suitable technical aviation related skills.

=== Brunei ===
Brunei Air Scouts is an extension programme run under Brunei Scout Federation (PPNBD). It was formed on 29 April 1999. The current appointed commissioner is Skipper Zakaria Mohamad Nor. There are a few schools that already have air scout troops namely,

Troop 1001 Sekolah Menengah Sultan Jamalul Alam,

Troop 1002 Maktab Sultan Omar Ali Saifuddien,

Troop 1012 Sekolah Menengah Saiyyidina Husain,

Troop 1099 IGS College (Air Rovers).

=== Cambodia ===
Although only a recent member of WOSM, The National Association of Cambodian Scouts is reported to have some Air Scout Groups.

=== Chile ===
Chile and Brazil vie for the first officially recorded Air Scout Groups in South America. The first Air Scout Group in Chile, "Rodolfo Marsh", was established on 17 September 1936 at the Chilean Air Force base at Quintero. The founder and first Scoutmaster was Don Leopoldo Sánchez.

=== Colombia ===
At present, only one Air Scout Group—'Tigres Del Aire'—is known in Colombia. It is a member of Asociación Scouts de Colombia.

=== Cyprus ===
Air Scouting in Cyprus is an active part of the Cyprus Scouts Association programme.

=== Czech Republic ===
An Air Scouting troop exists within Junák, the Czech Scouting organisation.

=== Egypt ===
Egyptian Federation for Scouts and Girl Guides is structured into 4 central associations – Scouts, Sea Scouts, Air Scouts and Guides. The Air Scouts section headed is by the Commissioner for Air Scouts, Mohamed Abdel-Hamid.

Each of these four central associations has a corresponding regional association in the twenty-six governorates of Egypt; a coordination committee in each governorate organises the activities and the cooperation between the associations.

The first Air Scouts in Egypt where formed early in 1954, and in the same year the executive committee of the Air Scouts was formed and held its first meeting in the office of the Director-General of the Egyptian Civil Aviation Authority on 17 February 1954.

In January 2007, the first Air Scout Festival was held in Ismalia.

=== Finland ===
Symbol of Finnish Air Scouting

Current Finnish Air Scouting started in 2015 by a group based at the Helsinki-Malmi airport. However, aerial activities have existed in Finnish Scouting since the 1930s. By 2023 there are three active Air Scout groups.

=== France ===
Air Scouts (Scouts de L'Air) started in the north of France in the mid-1930s. The first documented French Air Scout camp was held at Saint Cyr, 25 August to 1 September 1935. After World War II it was restarted by a few groups and at the 1947 Peace Jamboree many full-sized gliders built by various Air Scouts where shown to participants and demonstrated as well as activities such as aeromodelling.

Currently only two practising Air Scout Troops are known – one based in southeast France and one of the smaller French Associations.

=== Greece ===
Air Scouting in Greece is an active specialist branch of the Soma Hellinon Proskopon (Scouts of Greece) programme. Air Scouts are called Aeroproskopoi. There is a Region for Air Scouts of approximately 57 Air Scout groups. The Greek Air Scouting branch was founded in 1945.

=== Hong Kong ===
Air Scouting in Hong Kong started in 1967, when a Jesuit priest, Father Cunningham formed an Air Scout Troop in the 11th Kowloon Scout Group of Wah Yan College, Kowloon during the 5-year expansion plan of the Scout Association of Hong Kong. The 11th Kowloon Group (Wah Yan College, Kowloon) is a "closed school Scout Group" with Scout membership open only to students of this college in the Kowloon Peninsula of Hong Kong. As a result, there was only one Air Scout Unit in the territory from 1967 to 1972. In 1974, a Venture Air Scout Unit was added to the Group.

In 1972, the Chief Scout of Hong Kong appointed Francis Yiu Cheong Chin as the first Air Scout Commissioner to develop and expand Air Scouting. Mr. Chin is a Queen's Scout, a Trainer, and a member of the Hong Kong Chin Brothers aviators with the long-distance flying record of successfully completed "The First 100 horsepower Single-engine England to Hong Kong Long Distance Cross-Country Flight in History". As a result, Air Scouting spread and flourished after 1972. There are 18 Air Scout units in 5 Regions of Scout Groups in Hong Kong.

=== Hungary ===
Hungarian scouts were forerunners of Air Scouting in Europe. During the 1933 World Jamboree held in Hungary, they organized an air show with gliders. On August 9, there was a special Air Scout reception with Robert Baden-Powell, Pál Teleki, Hungarian Chief Scout, and László Almásy, Chief of the Hungarian Scout Air Squads. With the advent of democracy, after the years of communist rule when Scouting was banned, Magyar Cserkészszövetség (Hungarian Scout Association), a WOSM member, had not officially started an Air Scouting programme. Still, recently, an Air Scout Group – Repülőcserkész – has been formed in Gyor in the western region of Hungary and is believed to be the only one in Hungary (as of October 2014). The local flying organisations around Gyor Regional Airport have supported them with access to appropriate activities. The Group is adapting their Air Scouting Programme from a various of sources, including Poland, Ireland, Spain and the UK.

=== India ===
The Bharat Scout and Guide organisation of India have Air Scouting and Air Guiding branches.

=== Indonesia ===
"Saka Dirgantara" is the Air Scout specialism programme of the Indonesian Scout Association – Gerakan Pramuka aimed at the Rover Scout section (16–20) known as Satuan Karya. This aeronautical skills programme focuses on three different aspects:

- Aero Sport: Motorized Flight, Non Motorized Flight, Aeromodelling, Sky Diving, Hang Gliding
- Aero Knowledge: Aerodynamics, Air Traffic Control (ATC), Meteorology, Flight Supporting Facility, Air Navigation
- Aero Service: Aircraft Mechanical engineering, Flight Communication, Aerial SAR, Aero Structure

Air Scouting in Indonesia is supported by the Indonesian Air Force TNI AU and other aero club organisations.

=== Ireland ===
Air Scouting was a branch of Scouting Ireland which combines the normal Scouting activities such as camping and hiking with an interest in aviation and space. Since the re-launch of their "One" Scouting programme, a separate Air Scout branch has been absorbed, but with a strengthening of an Air Activities programme.

=== Italy ===
In 1949, CNGEI started activities with Air Scouting, which were followed by the organisation of a first course in aeronautical culture, organised at the Air War School in Florence-Cascina, but, at the end of the sixties, clear material and logistics difficulties blocked the development and the activities of the Air Scouts inside the institution.

=== Kenya ===
Air Scouting programme in Kenya is currently being renewed and with the 'Young Aviators Air Scouts Open Troop' in Langata District operating successfully.

=== Malaysia ===
The first Air Scout patrol was established in the Victoria Institution in 1951 and ceased to exist in 1955. The 10th Kuala Lumpur Group in the Methodist Boys' School was established circa 1915, converted to Air Scouts in 1951 and remains active. Air Scouts Troops exist in Kuala Lumpur and Johor Bahru.

=== Malta ===
Malta currently only has one Air Scout Group who runs an adapted Air Scouting Program, which was originally based on the UK scheme. The Air Scout Group is attached to St Augustine's College. The group has for a number of years participated in JOTA/JOTI. Malta previously had a number of other Air Scout Groups which are now defunct.

=== Netherlands ===
Air Scouting (luchtscouting) in the Netherlands is an active part of the programme. There are currently 15 Air Scout groups. They wear a grey shirt.

=== New Zealand ===
The New Zealand Air Scouts are part of the national Scouts New Zealand association, affiliated with the World Organization of the Scout Movement. There are multiple Air Scout groups based in New Zealand, including: Whenuapai Air Scouts, Taiaotea Air Scout Group Browns Bay, Pearse Air Scouts, and Captain Musick Air Scouts.

=== Nigeria ===
The Airscout Wing of the Scout Association of Nigeria (formerly Boy Scouts of Nigeria) was established in 1978 by an aeronautical engineer working for Nigerian Airways. The initial objectives where to cater for the young people in the science and art of airmanship/aviation trades, discipline and citizenship. However, the Air Scouts made their first national appearance at Makurdi in 1987, with the very first Rover Air Crew led by Segun Ige (of the Nigerian Air Force).

Their Air Scout Training Methods are published here:

=== Pakistan ===
Pakistan Air Scouts Association under Pakistan International Airlines and Pakistan Aviation Clubs as well as Pakistan Air Force is an active organisation of Pakistan Boy Scouts Association came into being on 7 September 1970 under the order of POR Policy Organisation Rules of Pakistan Boy Scouts Association. First Air Scouts Association to be divided into Squadrons and to be equipped with, state of the art aircraft and gliders, which include Karakoram-8, PAC MFI-17 Mushshak, Stemme S6, DG-808, Para Glider and much more. Founder Air Chief Marshal Anwar Shamim NI(M), SJ.

Pakistani Air Scouts training methods inspire them to join the aviation industry of Pakistan whether it be Pakistan Air Force, PIA or any other Civilian Flying Clubs. Their Main Training branches are Paf Colleges, Scouts Global Village, Islamabad & Air Commanders School, Islamabad (A.C.S).

In 2020 the first graduation ceremony was held at Pakistan Boy Scouts National Headquarters located at Scouts Global Village, Sumbol Park Islamabad. In this ceremony one Air Scout namely Flying Cadet Sameer Shah (Prince Of Air Scouting) was decorated with the prestigious Sword of Honor for being the best Air Scout of Pakistan Air Scouts Association. Sqn Ldr Sameer Shah has been now promoted to the rank of Wing Commander and is currently the Officer Commanding of PASA's No.5 Squadron named the Falcons stationed at Islamabad and side by side he has been appointed the ACS Instructor at PASA's Air Commanders School where he is training young Air Scouts with Aviation activities as well as scouting activities. He has also rendered services in No.1 Squadron (Raffiques), No.4 Squadron (Cobras), No.9 Squadron (Griffins) and currently in No.5 Squadron (Falcons) as well as Air Commanders School.

=== Paraguay ===
A single member Scout Group of the Confederación Interamericana Scouts Independientes (CISI) in Asunción, Paraguay has both Sea and Air Scout sections. This is probably due to it being supported by the local Naval Air Force Base.

Air Scout Section Tropa Nº2 "Aviadores del Chaco", of the scout group Nº1 Capitan Figari, founded in 1975, member of the ANBSP.

=== Peru ===
A small number of Air Scout Groups exist in Peru as part of the Asociación de Scouts del Perú (ASP, Scout Association of Peru).

=== Poland ===
Air Scouting (harcerskie lotnictwo) in Poland is an active part of the programme. The Air Scouting branch was founded in 1928. There are currently Scout Balloon Club, 1 Air Scout Group and 9 Air Scout Troops.

=== Portugal ===
The "Escotismo do Ar" activities began in the 1930s. In 1935, an Air Scouting Group from Associação dos Escoteiros de Portugal was created in Lisbon. Same year, Corpo Nacional de Escutas in Angola (then part of Portuguese empire) establish the same scouting model in Moçâmedes. Both groups ended in the following year. Only in 2015, at Montijo, Corpo Nacional de Escutas (Portuguese Catholic Scouts) opened a new one.

=== Singapore ===
The city-state of Singapore has an Air Scout Group, the Soaring Eagles Air Scout Wing, originally started in 1998 as Cub Pack attached to Woodlands Ring Primary School but has expanded over the years and moved its base location to Endeavour Primary School. The Group now has over 100 members including Cub Scouts, Scouts and Ventures and involves itself in a wide range of community and Scouting activities.

In 2012 the group "piloted" the first Young Aviator Course for Cub Scouts in Singapore as part of a revamp of the Air Scouting Programme, supported by an educational donation from the Civil Aviation Authority of Singapore. This event led to an additional aviation focused Cub Pack to start up.

=== South Africa ===
Air Scouting in South Africa is an active part of the Scouts South Africa programme. Since 2005 Air Scouting has expanded, especially in Gauteng, where the first Airjamborally since the 1980s was held during August 2005. The Gauteng Area Air Scouts has 5 of the 8 Air Scout Groups.

=== Spain ===
Air Scouting activity had been extremely poor up to date, just a few single troops merged in ASDE (Scouts de España, WOSM) from Valencia and Tenerife (Canary Islands), both experiencing a period of activity of about two or three years during the late 1970s. Today, there's a revival on the way with two active groups in the ASDE Madrid area, one more in the ASDE Castilla-Le Mancha area (in Albacete) and the older group active in Barcelona belonging to the Associació Catalana de Scouts (Catalan Association of Scouts, WFIS).

=== Sri Lanka ===
Supported by the Sri Lankan Air Force, the 57th Colombo is a member of the Sri Lanka Scouts Association and has over 90 members. The group, which was originally started in 1972, holds its meetings at three Sri Lankan Air Force bases but is classed an 'Open Group'. As well as providing a standard Scouting Programme, they additionally have aviation based activities. (The sections are Junior Air Scouts aged 11 to 15 years and 15 to 18 years for Senior Air Scouts)

=== Sudan ===
The Sudanese Air Scout and Girl Guides Group is an active part of the Sudan Scouts Association and Girl Guides Association of Sudan. It was founded in 1975 by Isam Kamel and Alladeen Hassan Abas as part of the National Aviation Institute. In 1976, they transferred the Air Scout activities to the Sudanese Air Scout club in Nile Street Khartoum. Sudanese Air Scout members attend local activities, in addition to activities organised outside of the Sudan, such as Arab and International Jamborees. Also, Sudanese Air Scouts send some members to study plane models in the Czech Republic.

=== Thailand ===
Air Scouting in Thailand was established on 21 July 1965.

=== Trinidad and Tobago ===
The Trinidad & Tobago Scout Association states that there are two Air Scout Groups in their membership, the 2nd Guaico Air Scouts based at Guaico Secondary School and the 1st Arouca Air Scouts based at the Arouca Anglican Church. The First Arouca Scout Group was started at the Arouca Anglican School in the 1930s. In 1986 it was converted into an Air Scout Group under the watch of Mr. John Morris and Dr. Stephen V. Blizzard.

First Arouca Air Scout Group;

Milestones

- 1986 Conversion to Air Scouts.
- 1989 Members attended and took part as volunteers at an Air Show at Piarco International Airport.
- 1989-90 Leaders and senior Scouts engage in a series of Air experience flights at a recognised flying club.
- 1990 First Air Display set up at national youth rally.
- 1991 Members participated as volunteers at the Air disaster drill at Piarco Airport.
- 2004 Members participated as volunteers at the Air disaster drill at Piarco Airport.
- 2004 Venture Scouts and leaders introduced to computer simulated flight.
- 2004 Members took part in the International Patrol Camp at pleasant vile San Fernando.
- 2006 Leaders of the group took up the challenge of revising the Air Scout Programme under the guidance of Dr. Stephen V. Blizzard.
- 2008 Final draft of the new Air Scout Programme completed.
- 2010 Representation was made at a recognised flight school for the resumption of Air experience flights.
- 2016 The group was featured at an Air Scout Exhibition at Scout Headquarters in Port of Spain.
- 2016 December, the group celebrated 30 years of Air Scouting by hosting a dinner and awards ceremony with presentations of memorabilia.
- 2017 First Aviation camp held in April at the D'Abadie Government School. 98 Campers attended.

=== Turkey ===
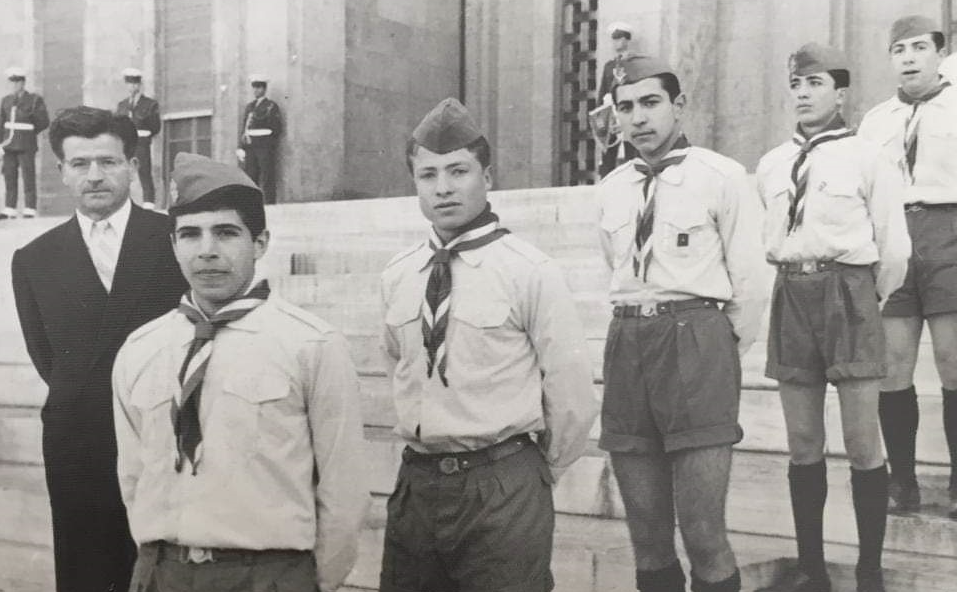
Air scouts in Ankara

The Scout movement in Turkey dates back to 1909, marking the beginning of organised scouting activities in the country. Air Scouting was introduced in November 1959 by Turgut Kurdaş, a teacher in Ankara. This new branch of scouting provided young people with specialised training and experiences in aviation.

=== United Kingdom ===
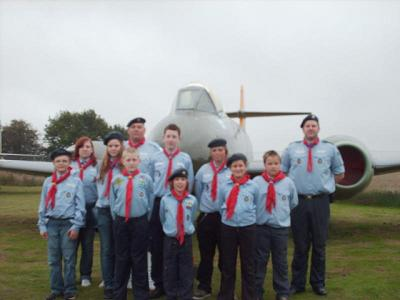
Air Scouts of the Baden-Powell Scouts' Association, July 2008

British Scouts have been involved in aviation since the early days of aviation. The first UK Scout Group known to have built and flown their glider were East Grinstead who flew for 200 feet at an altitude of 25 feet, in 1912. The first powered aircraft to be owned by UK Scouts was an Airco DH.6 presented to 3rd Hampton (Middlesex) Scouts in 1921.

The idea of Air Scouts as a distinct unit was resisted for many years, becoming an official branch of Scouting in 1941. The first National Air Scout camp took place in Avington Park in July 1942 and in December 1942 a National Air Scout exhibition was held in Dorland Hall, London. The Scout Association bought their first glider in 1959, and operated an Air Activity Centre at Lasham, near Alton in Hampshire, until 1978.

Currently around 1% of all Scouts in the Scout Association are in one of the 120 Air Scout Troops or Explorer Units. An Air Scout Troop can apply to become recognised with the Royal Air Force and thus can receive special opportunities and trips. This RAF Recognition is subject to a regular 18-month inspection by a designated RAF Reserve Officer. Air Scouting is also provided for within the Baden-Powell Scouts' Association.

==== Aircraft owned by UK Scouts ====
Several aircraft have been owned by Scouts in the United Kingdom, including:

- Airco DH.6 – owned by 3rd Hampton Scout Troop, Middlesex in 1921
- Auster J/1N Alpha, G-AGYH, owned Scout Association between 1968 and 1971
- Slingsby Falke G-AYYK, owned Scout Association, and used at Lasham airfield
- Scheibe Falke, G-BODU – owned by Hertfordshire Scouts, in use at Cambridge Gliding Centre
- Pegasus Quik GT450 G-CFFN, owned by Kent County Scout Council since 2008.
- Thunder Ax7-77 Hot air balloon G-BCAS, owned Scout Association 1979 to 1981.
- Cameron O-84 Hot air balloon G-STAV, owned by Blenheim Scout Group since 2009.
- Vickers Valetta C2, VX580, formerly owned by Norfolk Scout County – now at the Norfolk and Suffolk Aviation Museum
- Avro York C1, G-ANTK, registered to Dan Air and formerly used as a bunk house by Air Scouts at Lasham – now at the Imperial War Museum
- de Havilland Comet, G-APDK, registered to Dan Air and formerly used as a bunk house by Air Scouts at Lasham – now scrapped

=== United States ===
Air Scouts was a programme of the Boy Scouts of America (BSA). The Air Scouts programme had four ranks Apprentice, Observer, Craftsman, and Ace (later under the Explorer program the ranks were Apprentice, Bronze, Gold, and Silver Award). The Ace (Silver Award) cloth knot and medal may still be worn by anyone who earned them before the program was dropped.

The name is also used as a derogatory reference to members of the U.S. Air Force, typically used by combat troops of the U.S. Army and U.S. Marine Corps.

== Bibliography ==
- Air Scout Manual. Proof edition. Boy Scouts of America. First printing, December 1942.
- J. da Silva Matz (2003), Guía de progreso para SCOUTS, con suplemento para Scouts Aéreos. (Advancement guide for SCOUTS, with supplement for Air Scouts). ISBN 978-84-17733-73-5 (in Spanish)
- J. da Silva Matz (2024), Guía de progreso aéreo, Scouts Mayores y Rover Scouts. (Air advancement guide, Senior Scouts and Rover Scouts), ISBN 978-84-10319-98-1 (in Spanish]
