= Outline of the British Royal Air Force at the end of the Cold War =

Organisation and equipment in 1989

At the end of the Cold War in 1989, the structure of the Royal Air Force (RAF) was as follows:

The Chief of the Air Staff (CAS) was an air chief marshal (ACM), who was the professional head in command the Royal Air Force. He was a member of the Chiefs of Staff Committee, the Defence Council, and the Air Force Board, which administered the Royal Air Force. The following positions were part of the Air Force Board:

- Secretary of State for Defence – as Chairman
- Minister of State for the Armed Forces – as Vice-chairman
- Minister of State for Defence Procurement
- Under-Secretary of State for the Armed Forces
- Under-Secretary of State for Defence Procurement
- Chief of the Air Staff – with the rank of air chief marshal (generally the Chief of Air Staff would be promoted to the rank of Marshal of the Royal Air Force upon retirement at the conclusion of their term as CAS)
- Air Member for Personnel – with the rank of air marshal
- Air Member for Supply and Organisation – with the rank of air marshal
- Controller of Aircraft – usually an RAF officer with the rank of air marshal, though in 1989 it was held by a member of the Civil Service
- Second Permanent Under-Secretary of State and Controller R & D Establishments, Research and Nuclear

The manned strength of the Royal Air Force in 1989 was 93,300 personnel.

== RAF Strike Command ==
Royal Air Force Strike Command (RAF Strike Command, or RAF STC), was the main and primary command of the Royal Air Force, and was in charge of all operational (front-line or combat) Royal Air Force units and assets in the United Kingdom. Its Commander-in-Chief (C-in-C) was Air Chief Marshal Sir Patrick Hine, who double-hatted as NATO, Commander-in-Chief United Kingdom Air Forces (CINCUKAIR), which was a major subordinate command under NATO's Supreme Allied Commander Europe. In 1989, RAF Strike Command consisted of three major operational groups, along with its subordinate wings, squadrons and minor units; and also had administrative control of the Royal Observer Corps (ROC), which was tasked with nuclear warfare analysis and manned the UK's nuclear fallout warning service.

- UK Regional Air Operations Centre, RAF High Wycombe
  - Headquarters No. 1 Group, RAF Upavon
  - Headquarters No. 11 (Air Defence) Group, RAF Bentley Priory
  - Headquarters No. 18 (Maritime) Group, Northwood Headquarters, doubled as NATO Commander Maritime Air Eastern Atlantic (COMAIREASTLANT) and Commander Allied Maritime Air Force Channel (COMAIRCHAN)
  - Royal Observer Corps, RAF Bentley Priory, administrative control, but financed mostly by the Home Office under UK Warning and Monitoring Organisation
  - Central Tactics and Trials Organisation, RAF High Wycombe
  - Strike Command Air-to-Air Missile Establishment, RAF Valley
  - Strike Command Integrated Communications System.

=== No. 1 Group ===
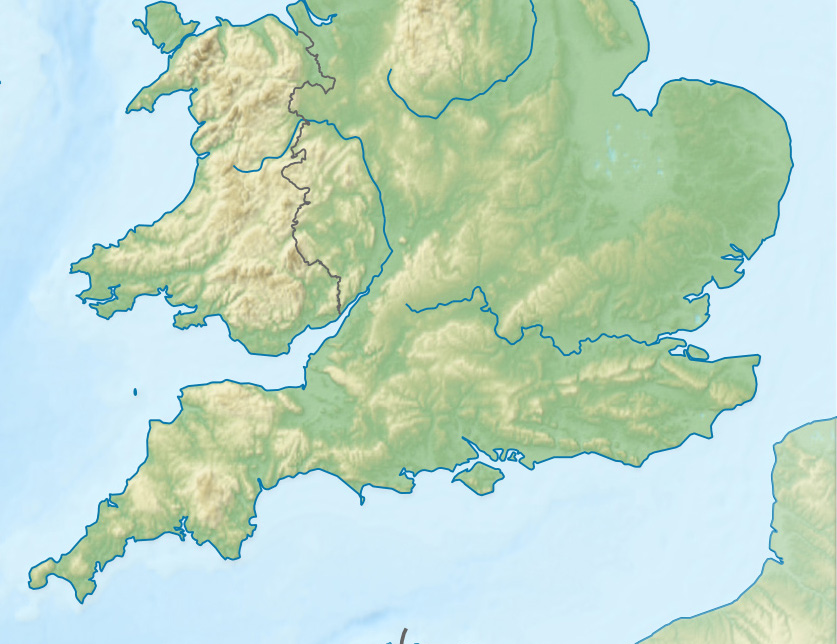
No. 1 Group RAF bases in the UK in 1989
Group HQ
Tornado GR1 & GR1A
Harrier GR5
Jaguar GR1 & GR1A
Hawk T1A
other bases (★ RAF Benson)

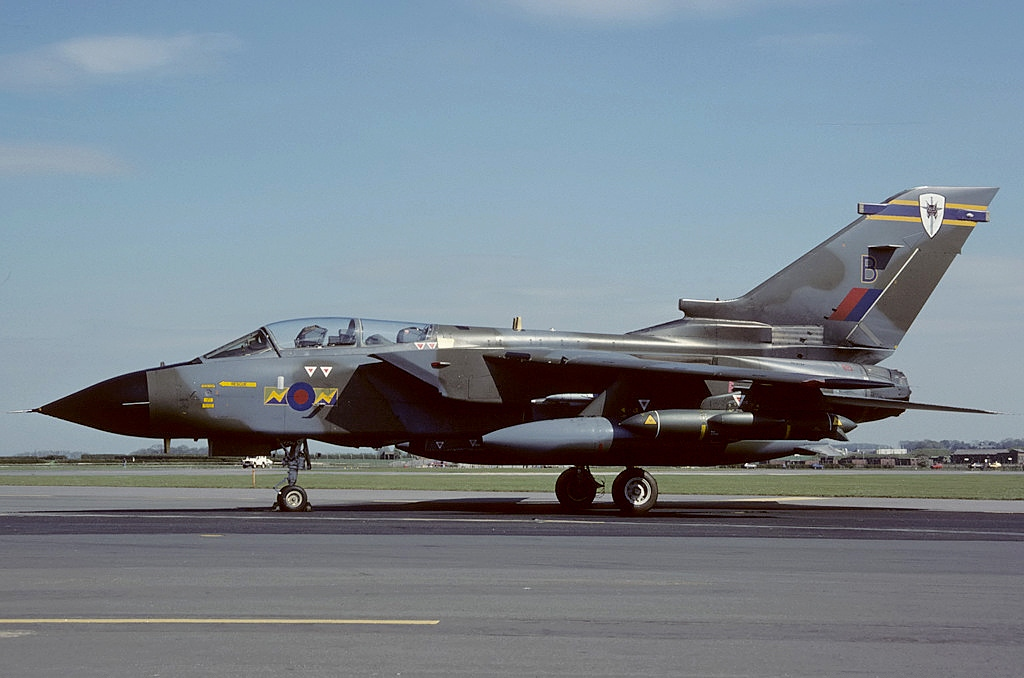
Tornado GR1A of No. 13 Squadron.

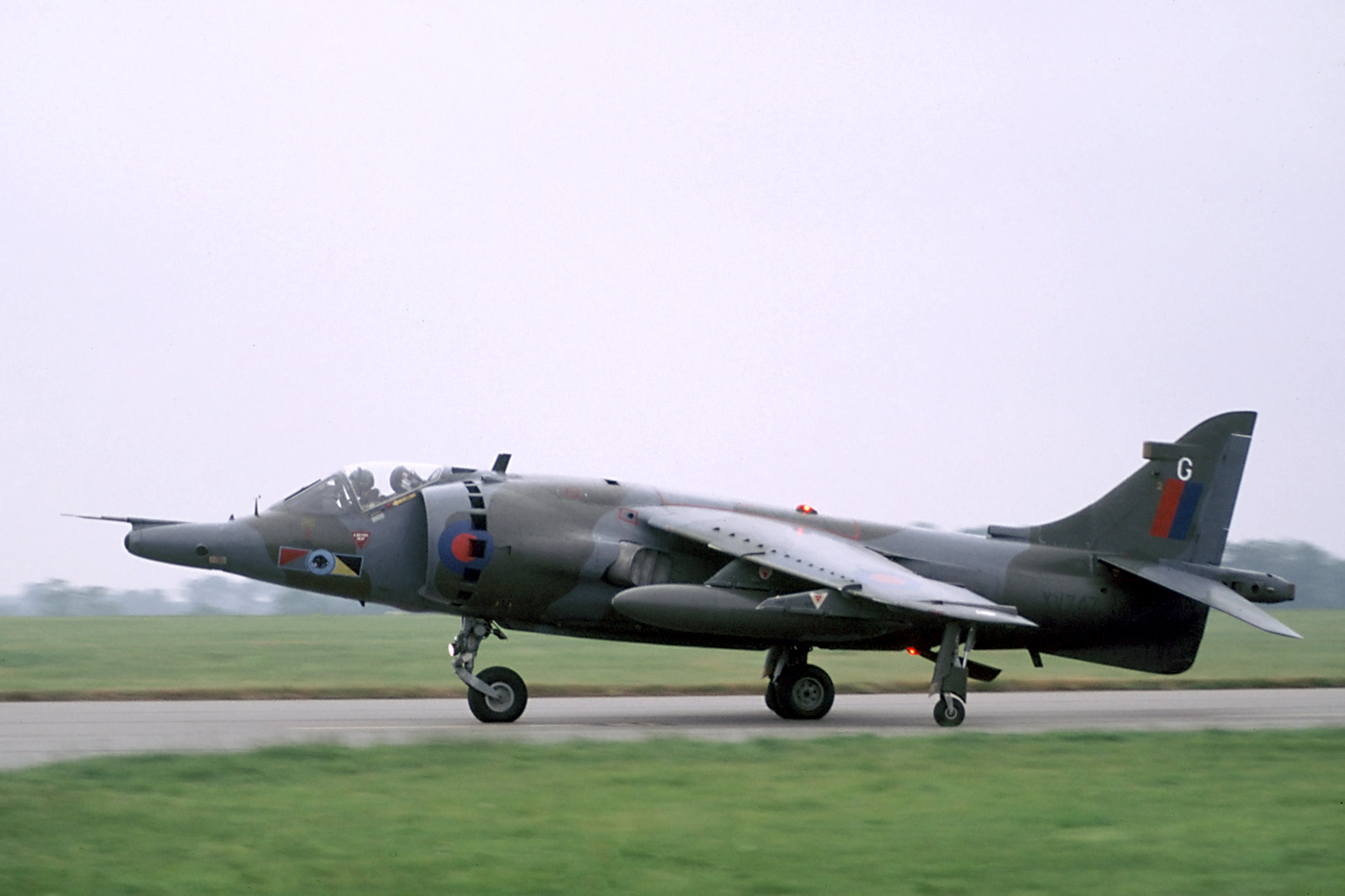
Harrier GR3 of No. 233 Operational Conversion Unit.

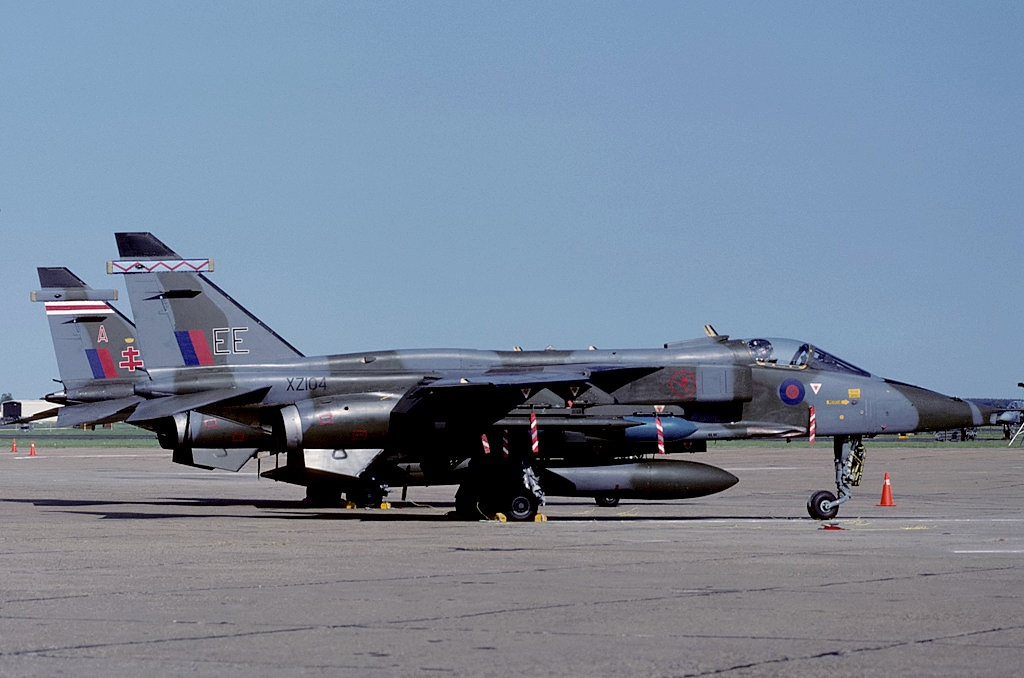
Jaguar GR1A of No. 6 Squadron (foreground) and No. 41 Squadron (background).

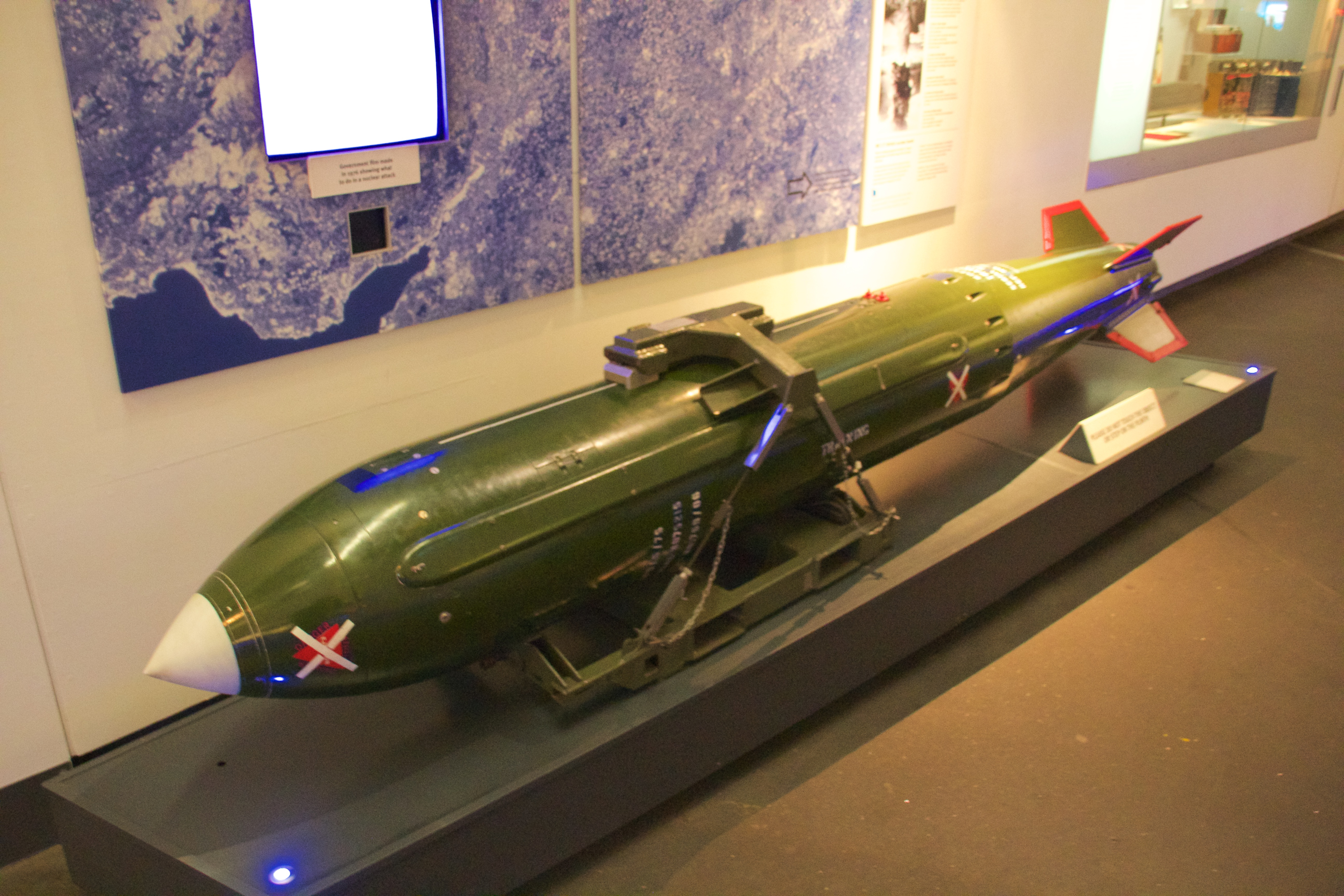
WE.177 free-fall nuclear bomb (training example), as available for the tactical nuclear strike role.

No. 1 Group Royal Air Force (1 Gp RAF) was the Royal Air Force group commanded by Air Vice-Marshal (AVM) Charles John Thomson (until February 1989), then AVM Ronald Andrew Fellowes Wilson (from February 1989), headquartered at RAF Upavon in Wiltshire. 1 Group contained varied aircraft, with the majority being strike aircraft. The group's main focus would have been bombing raids on advancing Soviet ground forces in Northern Germany as directed by NATO's Supreme Allied Commander Europe (SACEUR). The group fielded six squadrons of bomber aircraft, which could be armed with WE.177 free-fall tactical nuclear bombs, along with aerial refuelling tanker aircraft to ensure that the armed aircraft could deliver nuclear strikes deep inside enemy territory.

- No. 1 Group, group headquarters, RAF Upavon
  - Mobile Air Operations Team, 244 Signal Squadron, Royal Corps of Signals, RAF Upavon
  - RAF Aldergrove — under operational control of Headquarters Northern Ireland
    - No. 72 Squadron RAF — Wessex HC2
    - No. 3 Squadron RAF Regiment — field
  - RAF Benson
    - No. 115 Squadron RAF — radio and airport navigation aid calibration, Andover C1 / E3 / E3A
    - Queen's Flight — Royal Flight, BAe 146 CC2, Wessex HCC4
  - RAF Brize Norton
    - No. 10 Squadron RAF — transport, 13x Vickers VC10 C1
    - No. 101 Squadron RAF — aerial refuelling, 9x Vickers VC10 K2 / K3
    - No. 216 Squadron RAF — aerial refuelling, transport, and cargo, 9x Tristar K1 / KC1
    - No. 241 Operational Conversion Unit RAF — trained Vickers VC10 and Tristar crews
    - No. 19 Squadron RAF Regiment — air defence, Rapier launch stations, defending RAF Upper Heyford and RAF Fairford
  - RAF Coltishall
    - No. 6 Squadron RAF — tactical nuclear strike, ground attack / reconnaissance, 12x Jaguar GR1A^{note 1}
    - No. 41 Squadron RAF — reconnaissance, 12x Jaguar GR1A
    - No. 54 Squadron RAF — tactical nuclear strike, ground attack / reconnaissance, 12x Jaguar GR1A^{note 1}
  - RAF Honington
    - No. 13 Squadron RAF — reconnaissance, Tornado GR1A (activated 1 January 1990)
    - No. 45 Squadron RAF — Tornado Weapons Conversion Unit, Tornado GR1^{note 1}
    - No. 20 Squadron RAF Regiment — air defence, Rapier launch stations, defending RAF Alconbury, RAF Mildenhall, and RAF Lakenheath
  - RAF Lyneham
    - No. 24 Squadron RAF — tactical airlift, Hercules C1 / C3
    - No. 30 Squadron RAF — tactical airlift, Hercules C1 / C3
    - No. 47 Squadron RAF — tactical airlift, Hercules C1 / C3
    - No. 70 Squadron RAF — tactical airlift, Hercules C1 / C3
    - No. 242 Operational Conversion Unit RAF — Hercules C1 / C3
  - RAF Marham
    - No. 27 Squadron RAF — tactical nuclear strike, ground attack / reconnaissance, Tornado GR1
    - No. 617 Squadron RAF — tactical nuclear strike, ground attack / reconnaissance, Tornado GR1
    - No. 55 Squadron RAF — aerial refuelling, 14x Victor K2
  - RAF Northolt
    - No. 32 Squadron RAF — VIP flight, 12x BAe 125 CC2 / CC3, Andover CC2, Gazelle HCC4
  - RAF Odiham
    - No. 7 Squadron RAF — air assault, Chinook HC1
    - No. 33 Squadron RAF — tactical airlift, Puma HC1
    - No. 240 Operational Conversion Unit RAF — Puma HC1, Chinook HC1
    - Support Helicopter Standards and Evaluation Flight
  - RAF Wittering
    - No. 1 Squadron RAF — tactical nuclear strike, ground attack / reconnaissance, Harrier GR5
    - No. 233 Operational Conversion Unit RAF — Harrier GR5
  - RAF Brawdy
    - No. 1 Tactical Weapons Unit RAF
      - No. 79 (R) Squadron RAF — Hawk T1A
      - No. 234 (R) Squadron RAF — Hawk T1A
  - RAF Chivenor
    - No. 2 Tactical Weapons Unit RAF
      - No. 63 (R) Squadron RAF — Hawk T1A
      - No. 151 (R) Squadron RAF — Hawk T1A

Note 1: Unit had a nuclear strike role with WE.177 tactical nuclear weapons.

No. 1 Group RAF also administered the flying units detached to Belize and the Falkland Islands:

- British Forces Belize, Belize City, Belize
  - RAF Belize, Airport Camp, Ladyville
    - No. 1417 Flight RAF — ground attack / reconnaissance, Harrier GR3
    - No. 1563 Flight RAF — Puma HC1
- British Forces Falkland Islands, RAF Mount Pleasant, Falkland Islands
  - RAF Mount Pleasant
    - No. 78 Squadron RAF — air assault, Chinook HC1; Search & Rescue, Sea King HAR3
    - No. 1435 Flight RAF — air defence and reconnaissance, 4x Phantom FGR2
    - No. 1312 Flight RAF — aerial refuelling, 1x Hercules C1K.

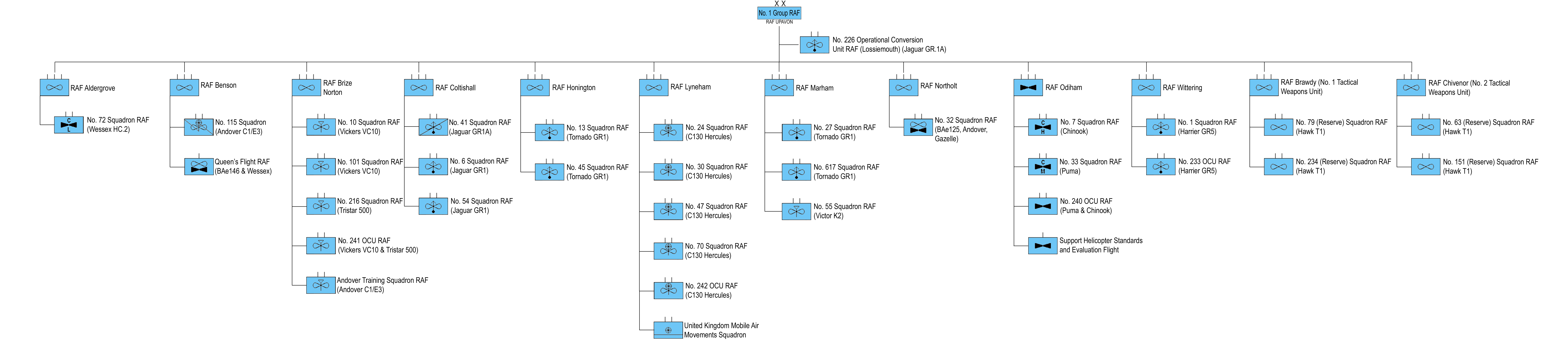
Graphical overview of No. 1 Group RAF in 1989. Note: only the states under the operational control of the group are shown.

=== No. 11 (Air Defence) Group ===
No. 11 Group RAF bases in 1989
Group HQ
Tornado F3
Phantom
Bloodhound Mk II

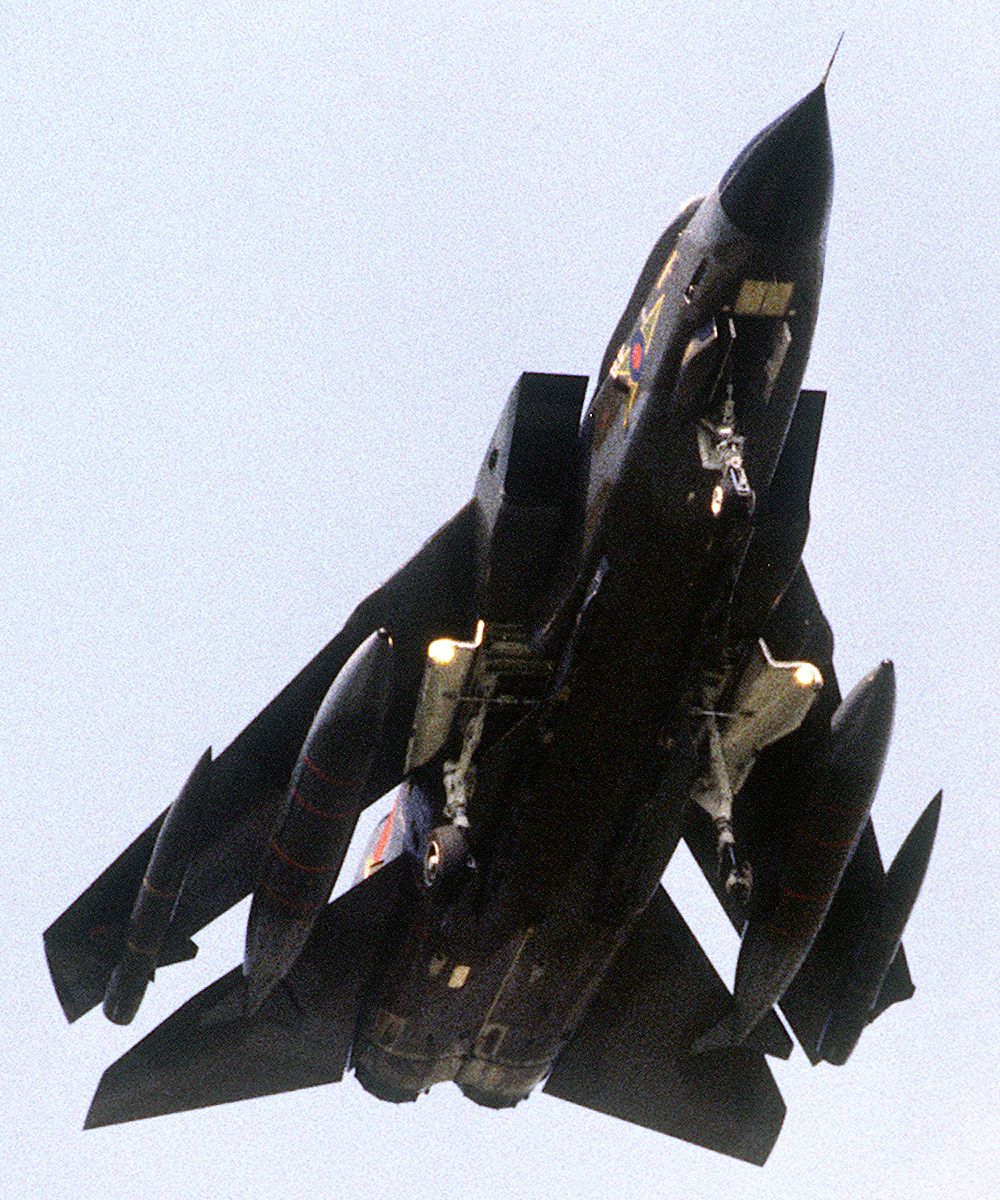
Tornado GR1 of No. 27 Squadron.

No. 11 (Air Defence) Group Royal Air Force (11 Gp RAF) was the Royal Air Force group commanded by Air Vice-Marshal Roger Hewlett Palin (until March) then William (Bill) John Wratten (from March), headquartered at RAF Bentley Priory. 11 Group was to defend the United Kingdom against all aerial threats, and fielded exclusively fighter aircraft and one air defence missile squadron. In 1989, the Royal Air Force was speedily replacing its ageing Phantom air defence fighter aircraft with the more modern and more capable Tornado F3, whose superior supersonic acceleration, powerful radar and beyond-visual-range missiles made it the ideal platform to intercept and destroy Soviet bombers intent on attacking the United Kingdom. In case of war, No. 11 (Air Defence) Group would have taken command of the five UK-based Hawk T1 training squadrons, which, armed with AIM-9L Sidewinder missiles would have become the last line of defence against Soviet air attacks.

- No. 11 (Air Defence) Group, group headquarters, RAF Bentley Priory
  - RAF Coningsby
    - No. 5 Squadron RAF — fighter, Tornado F3
    - No. 29 Squadron RAF — fighter, Tornado F3
    - No. 229 Operational Conversion Unit RAF — Tornado F3 (In case of war would have formed No. 65 Squadron RAF)
    - Battle of Britain Memorial Flight — historic aircraft memorial, Lancaster B1, Hurricane, Spitfire
  - RAF Leeming
    - No. 11 Squadron RAF — fighter, Tornado F3
    - No. 23 Squadron RAF — fighter, Tornado F3
    - No. 25 Squadron RAF — fighter, Tornado F3 (operational from 1 August 1989)
  - RAF Leuchars
    - No. 43 Squadron RAF — fighter, Tornado F3 (conversion from Phantom FG1 to Tornado F3 completed in September 1989)
    - No. 111 Squadron RAF — fighter / ground attack, Phantom FG1 (began to receive Tornado F3s in January 1990)
    - No. 228 Operational Conversion Unit RAF — Phantom FGR2 (In case of war would have formed No. 64 Squadron RAF)
    - No. 27 Squadron RAF Regiment — air defence, Rapier launch stations
  - RAF Wattisham
    - No. 56 Squadron RAF — fighter / ground attack / reconnaissance, Phantom FGR2
    - No. 74 Squadron RAF — fighter, Phantom F-4J(UK) F3
  - RAF West Raynham
    - No. 66 Squadron RAF Regiment — air defence, Rapier launch stations, defending RAF Bentwaters and RAF Woodbridge
    - No. 85 Squadron RAF — Bloodhound Mk II surface-to-air missiles; D, E and F flights joined the squadron when No. 25 Squadron converted to Tornado F3 on 1 August 1989.
      - A Flight, at RAF West Raynham
      - B Flight, at RAF North Coates
      - C Flight, at RAF Bawdsey
      - D Flight, at RAF Barkston Heath
      - E Flight, at RAF Wattisham
      - F Flight, at RAF Wyton
  - RAF Fylingdales
    - UK Ballistic Missile Early Warning System.

=== No. 18 (Maritime) Group ===
No. 18 (Maritime) Group RAF bases in 1989
Group HQ
Nimrod MR2
Buccaneer / Jaguar
other bases

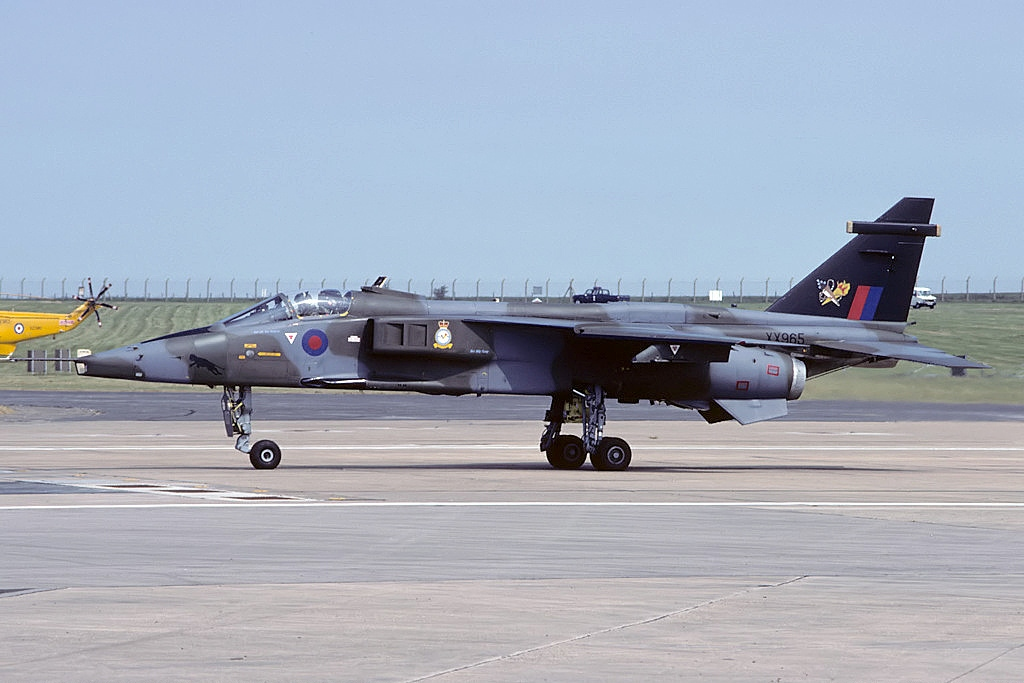
Jaguar GR1A of No. 226 Operational Conversion Unit RAF.

No. 18 (Maritime) Group Royal Air Force (No. 18 Group RAF, or 18Gp RAF) was the Royal Air Force group commanded by Air Marshal Andrew L. Roberts (until August) then David Emmerson (from August), headquartered at the Northwood Headquarters. During war, the Commander of No. 18 Group would also assume the titles of Commander Maritime Air Eastern Atlantic (COMAIREASTLANT) and Commander Allied Maritime Air Force Channel (COMAIRCHAN). In case of war, No. 18 Group's Maritime Air Region North would have assumed the titles of NATO Commander Maritime Air Northern Sub-Area (COMMAIRNORLANT) and NATO Commander Maritime Air Nore Sub-Area Channel (COMAIRNORECHAN), and taken command of Norwegian Air Force and US Navy P-3 Orion anti-submarine aircraft at Andøya Air Station and Naval Air Station Keflavik respectively, as well as the Keflavik-based US Air Force F-15C/D Eagles to prevent vessels of the Soviet Navy's Northern Fleet from passing through the GIUK gap.

The Maritime Headquarters units provided additional reserve personnel to man the operations rooms and communications centres that directed 18 Group and the Royal Navy.

The two Maritime Air Regions were amalgamated in 1987, and Pitrevie became the backup to Northwood HQ, becoming the location of Air Officer Scotland and Northern Ireland only.

- No. 18 (Maritime) Group, group headquarters, Northwood Headquarters, doubled as NATO Commander Maritime Air Eastern Atlantic (COMAIREASTLANT) and Commander Allied Maritime Air Force Channel (COMAIRCHAN)
  - Maritime Air Region North, RAF Pitreavie Castle, Rosyth, commanded by an Air Vice-Marshal, who doubled as RAF Air Officer Scotland and Northern Ireland, and NATO Commander Maritime Air Northern Sub-Area (COMMAIRNORLANT) and Commander Maritime Air Nore Sub-Area Channel (COMAIRNORECHAN)
    - RAF Kinloss
      - No. 120 Squadron RAF — maritime patrol, Nimrod MR2
      - No. 201 Squadron RAF — maritime patrol, Nimrod MR2
      - No. 206 Squadron RAF — maritime patrol, Nimrod MR2
    - RAF Lossiemouth
      - No. 8 Squadron RAF — airborne early warning and control, Avro Shackleton AEW2 (being replaced by 7x Sentry AEW1 aircraft, squadron was part of No. 11 (Air Defence) Group)
      - No. 12 Squadron RAF — maritime attack, Buccaneer S2B^{note 1}
      - No. 208 Squadron RAF — maritime attack, Buccaneer S2B^{note 1}
      - No. 226 Operational Conversion Unit RAF — land strike, Jaguar GR1 (unit was part of No. 1 Group)^{note 1}
      - No. 237 Operational Conversion Unit RAF — maritime attack, Buccaneer S2B^{note 1}
      - No. 48 Squadron RAF Regiment — air defence, Rapier launch stations
  - Maritime Air Region South, Admiralty House, Mount Wise, Plymouth, commanded by an Air Vice-Marshal, who doubled as NATO Commander Maritime Air Central Sub-Area (COMMAIRCENTLANT) and Commander Maritime Air Plymouth Sub-Area Channel (COMAIRPLYMCHAN)
    - RAF St Mawgan
      - No. 42 Squadron RAF — maritime patrol, Nimrod MR2
      - No. 236 Operational Conversion Unit RAF — Nimrod MR2 (In case of war would have formed No. 38 Squadron RAF)
    - RAF Wyton
      - No. 51 Squadron RAF — signals intelligence, 3x Nimrod R1
      - No. 100 Squadron RAF — electronic countermeasures, Canberra T17
      - No. 360 Squadron RAF — electronic countermeasures, Canberra T17
      - No. 231 Operational Conversion Unit RAF — Canberra T17
      - No. 1 Photographic Reconnaissance Unit RAF — Canberra PR9
      - Electronic Warfare and Avionic Unit
  - Search and Rescue Wing, RAF Finningley
    - No. 22 Squadron RAF — SAR, four flights of 2x Wessex HC2 at RAF Chivenor, RAF Leuchars, RAF Valley, RAF Coltishall
    - No. 202 Squadron RAF — SAR, squadron moved to RAF Boulmer in 1989, five flights of 2x Sea King HAR3 at RAF Boulmer, RAF Leconfield, RAF Brawdy, RAF Lossiemouth, RAF Manston (flight moved to RAF Wattisham in 1989)
    - Search and Rescue Training Unit
    - Search and Rescue Engineering
  - No. 1 (County of Hertford) Maritime Headquarters Unit, RAF Northwood (augmented HQ 18 Group)
  - No. 2 (City of Edinburgh) Maritime Headquarters Unit, Edinburgh (augmented HQ Northern Maritime Air Region and RAF Pitreavie Castle operations centre after 1987)
  - No. 3 (County of Devon) Maritime Headquarters Unit, RAF Mount Batten (augmented Southern Maritime Air Region)

Note 1: Unit had a nuclear strike role with WE.177 tactical nuclear weapons.

=== Royal Observer Corps ===
The Royal Observer Corps (ROC) was commanded by the Commandant Royal Observer Corps with the rank of Air Commodore, and headquartered at RAF Bentley Priory. The corps was tasked with detecting and reporting nuclear explosions and associated fallout as the field force for the United Kingdom Warning and Monitoring Organisation, (UKWMO). By the late 1980s, the ROC comprised 69 professional full-time officers, approximately 10,500 civilian part-time volunteers, and over 100 Ministry of Defence (MoD) civilian support staff.

== RAF Germany ==
Royal Air Force Germany stations in 1989 (all located in North Rhine-Westphalia)
RAF Germany HQ
Tornado GR1
Harrier GR5
Phantom FGR2

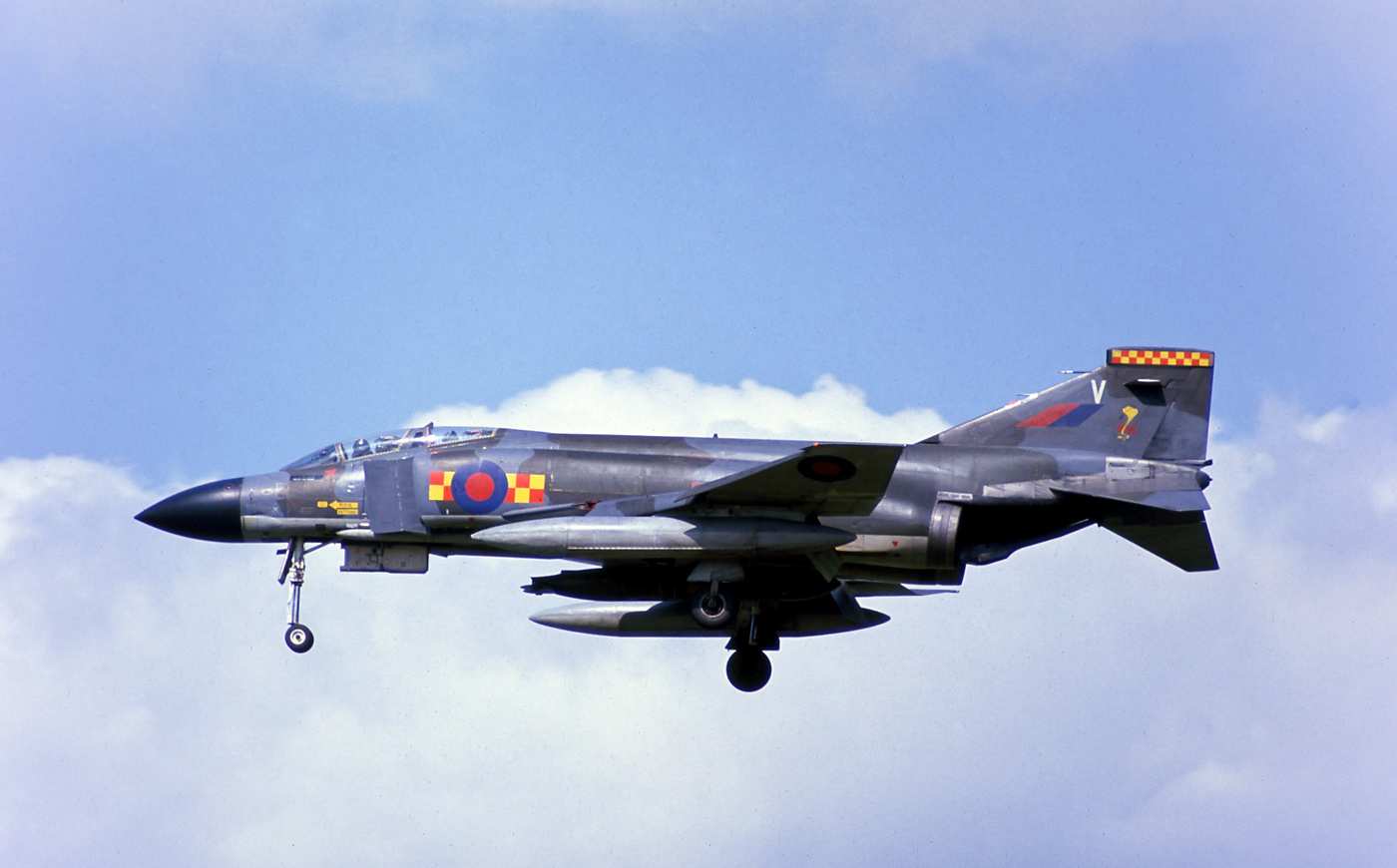
Phantom FGR2 of No. 92 Squadron RAF prior to landing at RAF Wildenrath in the mid-1980s

Royal Air Force Germany (RAF Germany, or RAFG), a major command of the Royal Air Force, consisted of Royal Air Force units located in West Germany as part of the United Kingdom's commitment to the defence of Western Europe during the Cold War. In wartime, the air marshal in command of RAFG would also have assumed the command of NATO's Second Allied Tactical Air Force. RAFG's main missions were to protect the British Army of the Rhine from Warsaw Pact air attacks, and bomb hostile armour formation. In case Soviet spearheads would have breached the Weser-line on the western side of the Upper Weser Valley, RAF Germany was trained and equipped to attack enemy troop concentrations to the east of the Weser with tactical nuclear weapons.

To fulfil its mission, RAFG had a varied mix of fixed-wing jet aircraft and rotary-wing aircraft under its command: Phantom FGR2 (fighter / ground attack / reconnaissance), Tornado GR1 (fighter-bomber / reconnaissance), helicopters, and Harrier GR5 vertical/short takeoff and landing (V/STOL) (ground attack / reconnaissance). As the most forward deployed units, the Harriers would have dispersed to auxiliary airfields, forest clearings, and road runways, during the transition to war to protect them from Soviet air attacks. The British Army's 38th Engineer Regiment and the Royal Auxiliary Air Force (RAuxF) Regiment's No. 2624 (County of Oxford) Field Squadron would have supported the Harrier Force at these dispersed locations.

- Royal Air Force Germany, command headquarters, RAF Rheindahlen, doubles as commander of NATO's Second Allied Tactical Air Force
  - RAF Germany Photographic Reproduction Unit, RAF Rheindahlen
  - RAF Bruggen
    - No. 9 Squadron RAF — tactical nuclear strike, ground attack / reconnaissance, 12x Tornado GR1^{note 1}
    - No. 14 Squadron RAF — tactical nuclear strike, ground attack / reconnaissance, 12x Tornado GR1^{note 1}
    - No. 17 Squadron RAF — tactical nuclear strike, ground attack / reconnaissance, 12x Tornado GR1^{note 1}
    - No. 31 Squadron RAF — tactical nuclear strike, ground attack / reconnaissance, 12x Tornado GR1^{note 1}
    - No. 37 Squadron RAF Regiment — air defence, Rapier launch stations
    - No. 51 Squadron RAF Regiment — light armour, Spartan, Scorpion
    - No. 11 Signals Unit
    - No. 431 Maintenance Unit RAF — airframe repair
      - No. 431 Maintenance Unit Detachment, RAF Laarbruch
  - RAF Gütersloh
    - No. 3 Squadron RAF — ground attack / reconnaissance, Harrier GR5
    - No. 4 Squadron RAF — ground attack / reconnaissance, Harrier GR5
    - No. 18 Squadron RAF — Chinook HC1, supporting British Army of the Rhine
    - No. 230 Squadron RAF — Puma HC1, supporting British Army of the Rhine
    - No. 63 Squadron RAF Regiment — air defence, Rapier launch stations
  - RAF Laarbruch
    - No. 2 Squadron RAF — reconnaissance, Jaguar GR1A / T2A, (replaced with Tornado GR1A from January 1989)
    - No. 15 Squadron RAF — tactical nuclear strike, ground attack / reconnaissance, 12x Tornado GR1^{note 1}
    - No. 16 Squadron RAF — tactical nuclear strike, ground attack / reconnaissance, 12x Tornado GR1^{note 1}
    - No. 20 Squadron RAF — tactical nuclear strike, ground attack / reconnaissance, 12x Tornado GR1^{note 1}
    - No. 1 Squadron RAF Regiment — light armour, Spartan, Scorpion
    - No. 26 Squadron RAF Regiment — air defence, Rapier launch stations
  - RAF Wildenrath
    - No. 19 Squadron RAF — fighter / ground attack / reconnaissance, Phantom FGR2
    - No. 60 Squadron RAF — transport, Andover CC2, Pembroke C1
    - No. 92 Squadron RAF — fighter / ground attack / reconnaissance, Phantom FGR2
    - No. 16 Squadron RAF Regiment — air defence, Rapier launch stations
  - No. 4 Wing RAF Regiment, RAF Wildenrath, administrative control of West Germany-based Rapier squadrons defending Royal Air Force Germany airfields
  - No. 33 Wing RAF Regiment, RAF Gütersloh, administrative control of West Germany-based light armour squadrons defending Royal Air Force Germany airfields
  - No. 54 Signals Unit, Celle — co-located with 14th Signal Regiment (Electronic Warfare), Royal Signals
  - No. 735 Signals Unit, Borgholzhausen

Note 1: Unit with nuclear strike role with 18x WE.177 tactical nuclear weapons.

== RAF Support Command ==
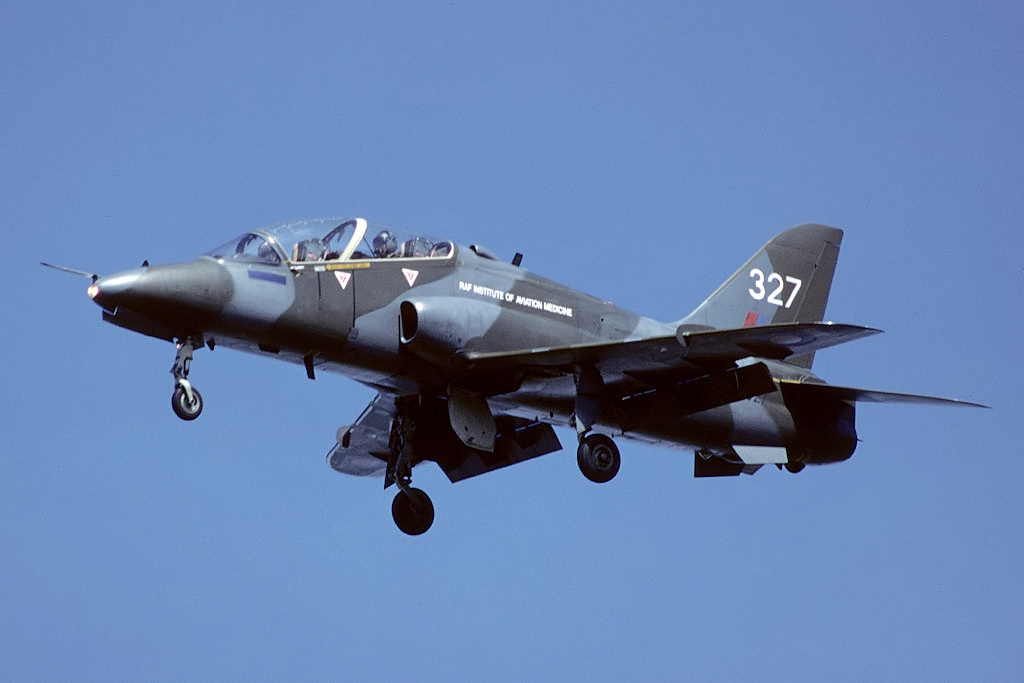
Hawk T1 of the RAF Institute of Aviation Medicine prior to landing at RAF Farnborough.

Royal Air Force Support Command (RAF Support Command, or RAF SupC), a main command of the Royal Air Force, was commanded by an air marshal, and headquartered at RAF Brampton in Cambridgeshire. During war, the command would have moved to its Emergency War Headquarter to a bunker at RAF Holmpton. Support Command had been created in 1973 by merging RAF Maintenance Command, with No. 90 (Signals) Group. In 1977, Support Command absorbed Training Command making it additionally responsible for all RAF ground and aircrew training.

In 1989, RAF Support Command was responsible for all signals under, logistics (Movements), maintenance (Air Officer Commanding Maintenance Units and Air Officer Maintenance, RAF Support Command), personnel management, ground transport (MT), supply, basic flying training, ground crew training (Air Officer Commanding Training Units and Air Officer Training, RAF Support Command), ordnance, recruitment, medical services, airbase services, IT systems, etc. Air Officer Commanding (AOC) were air vice-marshals. Below follows a provisional, unverified, partial listing of this large part of the Royal Air Force.

=== AOC Training Units and AO Training ===
The Air Officer Commanding (AOC) Training Units and Air Officer (AO) Training was an air vice-marshal (AVM) responsible for all training establishments of the Royal Air Force. The AOC Training Units and AO Training administered the following training establishments and units:

- Air Officer Commanding Training Units and Air Officer Training
  - Royal Air Force Staff College Bracknell, commanded by an air vice-marshal
  - RAF Scampton
    - Central Flying School — instructor training, Bulldog T1, Hawk T1, Gazelle HT3
    - Royal Air Force Aerobatic Team (RAFAT, the Red Arrows) — 10x Hawk T1
  - RAF Linton-on-Ouse
    - No. 1 Flying Training School — Jet Provost T5A (replaced by Tucano T1)
  - RAF Shawbury
    - No. 2 Flying Training School — helicopter flying training, Gazelle HT3, Wessex HC2
    - Central Flying School (Gazelle) — Gazelle HT3
    - Central Air Traffic Control School RAF
  - RAF Cranwell
    - Royal Air Force College Cranwell, commanded by an air vice-marshal
      - Initial Officer Training (IOT)
    - Engineering and Supply Officer Specialist Training
    - No. 3 Flying Training School — activated 1 February 1989, Jet Provost T3A (replaced by Tucano T1)
  - RAF Valley
    - No. 4 Flying Training School — Hawk T1
    - Central Flying School Advanced Training Unit — Hawk T1
    - Search and Rescue & Mountain Rescue Training Unit — 2x Wessex HC2
  - RAF Finningley
    - No. 6 Flying Training School
      - Low Level and Air Defence Training Squadron — low level navigation training, Jet Provost T5B
    - Multi-engine Training Squadron — operational navigation training for multi-engine pilots, Jetstream T1
  - RAF Church Fenton
    - No. 7 Flying Training School — Jet Provost T3A (replaced by Tucano T1)
    - Refresher Flying Squadron
  - RAF Brize Norton
    - No. 1 Parachute Training School
    - RAF Movements School
  - RAF Locking
    - No. 1 Radio School
  - RAF Halton
    - No. 1 School of Technical Training (1SofTT)
  - RAF Cosford
    - No. 2 School of Technical Training (2SofTT)
    - RAF School of Physical Training
    - Joint Services School of Photography
  - RAF St Athan
    - No. 4 School of Technical Training (4SofTT)
    - SG Ground Defence
  - RAF Boscombe Down
    - Empire Test Pilots' School — RAF element
  - RAF Mount Batten
    - Combat Survival and Rescue School
  - RAF Digby
    - Aerial Erector School
  - RAF West Drayton
    - Flight Control School, (moved to RAF Boulmer in 1990)
  - RAF Rochester
    - Defence Explosive Ordnance Disposal School
  - RAF Wyton
    - Joint Photographic Interpretation School
  - RAF Lossiemouth
    - Buccaneer and Jaguar Ground Servicing
  - RAF Odiham
    - Chinook Ground Servicing
    - Support Helicopter Standardisation and Evaluation Unit
  - RAF Wittering
    - Harrier Ground Servicing
  - RAF Kinloss
    - Nimrod Ground Servicing
  - RAF Cottesmore
    - Tri-National Tornado Training Establishment — 19x Tornado GR1 (UK), 6x Tornado IDS (Italy), 23x Tornado IDS (West Germany); 12x per flying squadron
      - A-Squadron — German Air Force squadron commander
      - B-Squadron — Royal Air Force squadron commander
      - C-Squadron — Italian Air Force squadron commander
      - S-Squadron — follow-on and instructor pilot training
      - Ground School — theory lessons and simulator training
    - Tornado Ground Servicing
  - RAF Marham
    - Victor Ground Servicing
  - RAF Sealand
    - Civilian Technical Training
  - RAF Hereford
    - Airmens' Command School
  - RAF Henlow
    - Officers' Command School
  - RAF Biggin Hill
    - Personnel Selection Training School
  - RAF Swinderby
    - Elementary Flying Training School — Chipmunk T10 elementary trainer
    - RAF School of Recruit Training
  - RAF Newton
    - RAF School of Education and Training Support
  - Amport House
    - RAF Chaplains School
  - RAF Uxbridge
    - RAF School of Music
  - RAF Aldershot
    - RAF School of Catering
  - RAF Manston
    - RAF Fire Services Central Training Establishment
  - RNAS Culdrose
    - Sea King Training Unit — joint unit of Royal Air Force and Royal Navy Fleet Air Arm
  - RAF Shawbury
    - Area Radar Training School
  - RAF Jurby Head — air weapons range.

==== AOC Air Cadets & Commandant Air Training Corps ====
- Air Officer Commanding Air Cadets & Commandant Air Training Corps, air commodore, RAF Syerston
  - Air Cadet Organisation (ACO)
    - Girls Venture Corps Air Cadets (GVC AC)
    - Air Training Corps (ATC)
      - Air Experience Flights (AEFs) — Chipmunk T10 elementary trainer
        - No. 1 Air Experience Flight RAF (1 AEF), RAF Manston
        - No. 2 Air Experience Flight RAF (2 AEF), RAF Hurn
        - No. 3 Air Experience Flight RAF (3 AEF), RAF Filton (moved to RAF Hullavington in June 1989)
        - No. 4 Air Experience Flight RAF (4 AEF), RAF Exeter
        - No. 5 Air Experience Flight RAF (5 AEF), Cambridge Airport
        - No. 6 Air Experience Flight RAF (6 AEF), RAF Abingdon
        - No. 7 Air Experience Flight RAF (7 AEF), RAF Newton
        - No. 8 Air Experience Flight RAF (8 AEF) RAF Shawbury
        - No. 9 Air Experience Flight RAF (9 AEF), RAF Finningley
        - No. 10 Air Experience Flight RAF (10 AEF), RAF Woodvale
        - No. 11 Air Experience Flight RAF (11 AEF), RAF Leeming
        - No. 12 Air Experience Flight RAF (12 AEF), RAF Turnhouse
        - No. 13 Air Experience Flight RAF (13 AEF), RAF Aldergrove
      - RAF Syerston
        - Air Cadet Central Gliding School (AC CGS)
        - Central Glider Maintenance Flight
      - Volunteer Gliding Squadrons (VGS)
        - 28x Volunteer Gliding Schools
      - University Air Squadrons (UAS) (all with Bulldog T.1)
        - East Lowlands Universities Air Squadron
        - Aberdeen, Dundee and St Andrews Universities Air Squadron
        - University of Birmingham Air Squadron
        - Bristol University Air Squadron
        - Cambridge University Air Squadron
        - Northumbrian Universities Air Squadron
        - East Midlands Universities Air Squadron
        - Edinburgh University Air Squadron
        - Universities of Glasgow and Strathclyde Air Squadron
        - Yorkshire Universities Air Squadron
        - Liverpool University Air Squadron
        - University of London Air Squadron
        - Manchester and Salford Universities Air Squadron
        - Northern Ireland Universities Air Squadron
        - Oxford University Air Squadron
        - Southampton University Air Squadron
        - Universities of Wales Air Squadron.

=== AOC Signals Units and AO Signals ===
The Air Officer Commanding (AOC) Signals Units and Air Officer (AO) Signals was an air vice-marshal (AVM) responsible for all signals units of the Royal Air Force. Besides Royal Signals Air Support Signals Units at operational RAF airbases and stations, the AOC Signals Units and AO Signals administered the following units.

- Air Officer Commanding Signals Units and Air Officer Signals
  - RAF Bampton Castle — high frequency radio communications
    - No. 2 Signals Unit
    - No. 81 Signals Unit
      - No. 81 Signals Unit (Detachment), RAF Kinloss
      - No. 81 Signals Unit (Detachment), RAF St Mawgan
  - RAF Boddington — computerised relay communications
    - No. 9 Signals Unit
  - RAF Digby — communications security
    - No. 399 Signals Unit
    - No. 591 Signals Unit
  - RAF Gibraltar
    - No. 291 Signals Unit
  - RAF Henlow
    - HQ RAF Support Command Signals Staff
    - RAF Signals Engineering Establishment
    - Radio Engineering Unit
    - Exhibition Production Flight
  - RAF Lindholme — automatic routing
    - No. 840 Signals Unit
  - RAF Rudloe Manor
    - HQ Fixed Telecommunications System
    - Controller Defence Communication Network
    - No. 6 Signals Unit
  - RAF Spadeadam — electronic warfare training
    - No. 721 Signals Unit
  - RAF Wattisham
    - No. 144 Signals Unit
  - RAF Woolwich
    - Special Signals Unit

Additional specialised signals units (SU) were detached to Royal Air Force Germany, British Sector Berlin, British Forces Gibraltar, British Forces Falkland Islands, and British Forces Cyprus.

=== AOC Maintenance Units and AO Maintenance ===
- Air Officer Commanding (AOC) Maintenance Units and Air Officer (AO) Maintenance
  - RAF Kemble
    - No. 5 Maintenance Unit RAF (5 MU)
  - RAF Quedgeley
    - No. 7 Maintenance Unit RAF (7 MU) — equipment supply depot
  - RAF Chilmark
    - No. 11 Maintenance Unit RAF (11 MU) — ammunition supply depot
  - RAF Carlisle
    - No. 14 Maintenance Unit RAF (14 MU) — equipment storage depot
  - RAF Stafford
    - No. 2 Mechanical Transport Squadron (2 MT)
    - No. 16 Maintenance Unit RAF (16 MU) — equipment storage depot
  - RAF St Athan
    - No. 19 Maintenance Unit RAF (19 MU) — equipment storage depot
  - RAF Aldergrove
    - No. 23 Maintenance Unit RAF (23 MU)
  - RAF Hartlebury
    - No. 25 Maintenance Unit RAF (25 MU)
  - RAF Sealand
    - No. 30 Maintenance Unit RAF (30 MU)
  - RAF Leconfield
    - No. 60 Maintenance Unit RAF (60 MU)
  - RAF Bicester
    - No. 71 Maintenance Unit RAF (71 MU)
  - RAF Cardington
    - No. 217 Maintenance Unit RAF (217 MU)
  - RAF Abingdon
    - Aircraft Maintenance Squadron — servicing Hawk, Jaguar, and Buccaneer
    - Repair and Salvage Squadron
  - RAF Coltishall
    - Adour Servicing Unit — servicing Rolls-Royce Adour engines for the Jaguar
  - RAF Kinloss
    - Nimrod Major Servicing Unit
  - RAF Marham
    - Victor Major Maintenance Unit
  - RAF Scampton
    - Tornado Radar Repair Unit
  - RAF Wildenrath
    - No. 402 Air Stores Park
  - RAF Hendon
    - RAF Supply Control Centre
  - RAF Swanton Manor
    - Maintenance Analysis and Computing Establishment
  - RAF Swanton Morley
    - Central Servicing Development Establishment.

=== AO Administration and AO Directly Administered Units ===
- Air Officer (AO) Administration and Air Officer (AO) Directly Administered Units
  - RAF Benson
    - RAF Support Command Flight Checking Unit
  - RAF Farnborough
    - Royal Aerospace Establishment
    - RAF Institute of Aviation Medicine
    - Meteorological Research Flight
  - RAF Boscombe Down
    - Aeroplane and Armament Experimental Establishment
  - RAF North Luffenham
    - No. 5131 (BD) Squadron RAF — explosive ordnance demolition
  - RAF Ascension Island
    - Hercules Flight
  - RAF Uxbridge
    - Queen's Colour Squadron of the RAF
    - Military Air Traffic Organisation
  - RAF Woolwich
    - Air Publications and Form Store.

== RAF Regiment ==
The Royal Air Force Regiment (RAF Regiment, or RAF Rgt) was headed by the Commandant-General, RAF Regiment and Director-General of Security with the rank of air vice-marshal, who was responsible for security at all Royal Air Force installations. The RAF Regiment served as the Royal Air Force's airbase defence corps. The regiment administered, trained, and maintained its squadron, which operationally were under the commanders of the airfields (Station Commander) they were assigned to. There were four types of squadron: Field (Light Infantry) and Light Armour squadrons as airfield ground defence forces, Air Defence squadrons, and one Light Armour / Paratroopers Squadron to seize and secure enemy airfields. The regiment fielded 16 squadrons and the Royal Auxiliary Air Force Regiment (RAuxAF) fielded eight reserve squadrons. The Regiment also provided the RAF Fire Service sections at all RAF airfields and trained firefighters and rescue personnel at its main base RAF Catterick in North Yorkshire.

The list below only lists squadrons that were under command of the regiment in 1989; the squadrons assigned to other units are listed under the RAF stations and airfields where they were based.

- RAF Regiment, RAF Catterick
  - RAF Fire Service, RAF Catterick
  - No. 3 Wing RAF Regiment, RAF Catterick — administrative control of unassigned UK-based squadrons
    - No. 58 Squadron RAF Regiment, RAF Catterick — Light Armour, Spartan, Scorpion
  - No. 5 Wing RAF Regiment, RAF Hullavington — administrative control of light armour squadrons supporting the UK's Harrier Force
    - No. 2 Squadron RAF Regiment, RAF Hullavington — Light Armour / Paratroopers, Spartan, Scorpion
    - No. 15 Squadron RAF Regiment, RAF Hullavington — Light Armour, Spartan, Scorpion
  - No. 6 Wing RAF Regiment, RAF West Raynham — administrative control of UK-based Rapier squadrons defending US Air Force Third Air Force airfields in the UK.

== Royal Auxiliary Air Force ==
The Royal Auxiliary Air Force (RAuxAF) was commanded by an air vice-marshal (AVM) and provided reinforcements to the Royal Air Force, which were manned by civilians and called upon in times of need or war. Although all RAuxAF units had previously been disbanded in 1957, it lived on in three Maritime Headquarter Units, which provided augmentation personnel for No. 18 (Maritime) Group Royal Air Force. In 1979, three Field Squadrons were formed to provide ground airfield defence. During the 1980s, additional squadrons and flights were raised, and by 1989, the RAuxAF fielded three Maritime Headquarter Units, two administrative wings, seven RAuxAF Regiment squadrons, two support squadrons, and three airfield defence flights.

- Royal Auxiliary Air Force
  - No. 4624 (County of Oxford) Movements Squadron RAuxAF, RAF Brize Norton
  - No. 4626 (County of Wiltshire) Aeromedical Evacuation Squadron RAuxAF, RAF Hullavington
  - No. 1310 Wing RAuxAF Regiment, RAF Catterick — administrative control of RAuxAF Regiment Field squadrons, formed 13 June 1989
    - No. 2503 (County of Lincoln) Squadron RAuxAF Regiment, RAF Waddington — Field
    - No. 2620 (County of Norfolk) Squadron RAuxAF Regiment, RAF Marham — Field
    - No. 2622 (Highland) Squadron RAuxAF Regiment, RAF Lossiemouth — Field
    - No. 2623 (East Anglian) Squadron RAuXAF Regiment, RAF Honington — Field
    - No. 2624 (County of Oxford) Squadron RAuxAF Regiment, RAF Brize Norton — Field, assigned to support the Harrier Force in West Germany
    - No. 2625 (County of Cornwall) Squadron RAuXAF Regiment, RAF St Mawgan — Field
  - No. 1339 Wing RAuxAF Regiment, RAF Waddington — administrative control of RAuxAF Regiment SHORAD squadrons, formed 1 October 1989
    - No. 2729 (City of Lincoln) Squadron RAuXAF Regiment, RAF Waddington — SHORAD
    - No. 2890 Squadron RAuXAF Regiment, RAF Waddington — SHORAD, formed 1 October 1989
  - RAF Brampton Airfield Defence Force Flight — tasked to defend RAF Support Command
  - RAF High Wycombe Airfield Defence Force Flight — tasked to defend RAF Strike Command
  - RAF Lyneham Airfield Defence Force Flight — tasked to defend the Hercules Force
  - RAF St Athan Royal Auxiliary Air Force Support Force Flight — trial formation

Note: The Royal Hong Kong Auxiliary Air Force was responsible to Commander, British Forces Hong Kong.

== Royal Air Force Volunteer Reserve ==
The Royal Air Force Volunteer Reserve (RAF Volunteer Reserve, or RAFVR) was a volunteer formation providing the RAF with specialists for a limited number of positions.

- Royal Air Force Volunteer Reserve
  - No. 7006 Flight RAF Volunteer Reserve, RAF High Wycombe — linguists
  - No. 7010 Flight RAF Volunteer Reserve, RAF Wyton — photographic interpretation
  - No. 7630 Flight RAF Volunteer Reserve, RAF Waddington — intelligence analysis
  - No. 7644 Flight RAF Volunteer Reserve, RAF Halton — media operations
  - Royal Air Force Volunteer Reserve (Training Branch) (RAFVR(T)) — providing volunteer personnel for the Air Training Corps (Royal Air Force Air Cadets)
  - Royal Air Force Volunteer Reserve (Defence Technical Undergraduate Scheme).

== RAF Provost & Security Services ==
The Royal Air Force Provost Marshal of the Royal Air Force Provost & Security Services (RAF P&SS) had the rank of air commodore, and was headquartered in the Metropole building in Whitehall, central London. At each RAF airbase and station, an RAF Police flight was tasked with guarding and securing the airbase or station. The flights were administered by the following higher commands:

- RAF Provost & Security Services (RAF P&SS) Provost Marshal, Whitehall
  - HQ P&SS (UK), RAF Rudloe Manor
    - HQ P&SS (Southern Region), RAF Rudloe Manor
    - HQ P&SS (Northern Region), RAF Newton
    - HQ P&SS (Northern Ireland), RAF Aldergrove
    - HQ P&SS (Scotland), RAF Turnhouse
    - RAF Police Support Squadron, RAF Rudloe Manor — deployable RAF Police unit
  - HQ P&SS (Germany), RAF Rheindahlen — part of RAF Germany
  - HQ P&SS (Cyprus), RAF Akrotiri — part of British Forces Cyprus
  - HQ P&SS (Gibraltar), RAF Gibraltar — part of British Forces Gibraltar
  - HQ P&SS (Hong Kong), RAF Sek Kong — part of British Forces Hong Kong
  - RAF Police Training School, RAF Newton
  - RAF Police Dog Training School, RAF Newton

== Women's Royal Air Force ==
The Women's Royal Air Force (WRAF) was the women's branch of the Royal Air Force, which provided the RAF with trained female personnel.

== Princess Mary's Royal Air Force Nursing Service ==
The Princess Mary's Royal Air Force Nursing Service (PMRAFNS) was the nursing branch of the Royal Air Force. The military nurses of the PMRAFNS staffed The Princess Mary's Hospital, RAF Akrotiri, RAF Hospital Ely, RAF Hospital Halton, RAF Hospital Uxbridge, RAF Hospital Wegberg, and RAF Hospital Wroughton.

== Royal Air Force Chaplains Branch ==
The Royal Air Force Chaplains Branch (RAF CB) provided military chaplains for the Royal Air Force. Chaplains and chaplain candidates were trained in military theology at the Royal Air Force Chaplains' School at Amport House.

== RAF Legal Branch ==
The Royal Air Force Legal Branch (RAFLB) was the uniformed legal service provider for the Royal Air Force. The RAFLB consisted of solicitors and barristers qualified in military law in a Commonwealth jurisdiction.

== RAF Medical Services ==
The Royal Air Force Medical Services (RAFMS) provided healthcare at home and on deployed operations to Royal Air Force personnel. Medical officers (MOs) were the doctors of the RAF, and had specialist expertise in aviation medicine to support aircrew and their protective equipment.

== Royal Air Force inventory 1989 ==
The airframe inventory of the Royal Air Force in 1989 consisted of the following aircraft:

Combat aircraft

- 229x Tornado GR1 / GR1A — additional 26x GR1 on order
- 165x Tornado F2 / F3 — additional 15x F3 on order
- 100+ Phantom FG1 / FGR2
- 14x Phantom F-4J(UK) F3
- 100+ Jaguar GR1 / GR1A / T2
- 80+ Harrier GR3 / T4
- 94x Harrier GR5 / GR7 — deliveries ongoing
- 65+ Buccaneer S2B
- 36x Nimrod MR2

Special mission

- 3x Nimrod Nimrod R1
- 6x Avro Shackleton AEW2
- Sentry AEW1 — 7x on order
- 40+ Canberra PR9 / T17
- 7x Andover E3 / E3A

Cargo and aerial refuelling

- 14x Victor K2
- 13x Vickers VC10 C1
- 4x/5x Vickers VC10 K2 / K3
- 9x Tristar K1 / KC1
- 6x Hercules C1K
- 24x Hercules C1 / C1P
- 30x Hercules C1 / C3
- 6x Andover C1
- 6x Andover CC2 — VIP Flight
- 2x BAe 146 CC2 — 1x on order, Queen's Flight
- 4x/2x/6x BAe 125 CC1 / CC2 / CC3
- 2x Pembroke C1

Helicopters

- 36x Chinook HC1
- 41x Puma HC1
- 18x Sea King HAR3
- 65x Wessex HC2
- 2x Wessex HCC4 — Queen's Flight
- 27x Gazelle HT2 / HT3
- 3x Gazelle HCC4 — VIP Flight

Trainers

- 117x Bulldog T1
- 62x Chipmunk T10
- 163x Provost T3A / T5A
- 160+ Hawk T1 / T1A
- 12x Hunter T7 / T8
- 20x Dominie T1 — navigation trainer
- 2x Jetstream T1
- Tucano T1 — 130x on order, deliveries beginning in December 1989

Royal Air Force flights were typically equipped with four aircraft. Royal Air Force flying squadrons consisted of two to four flights, with fighter squadrons in general consisting of three flights.

== See also ==
- Structure of the British Armed Forces in 1989
- Structure of the British Army in 1989
- Structure of the Royal Navy in 1989
