= Grob G 115 =

German trainer aircraft

G 115 (Tutor)
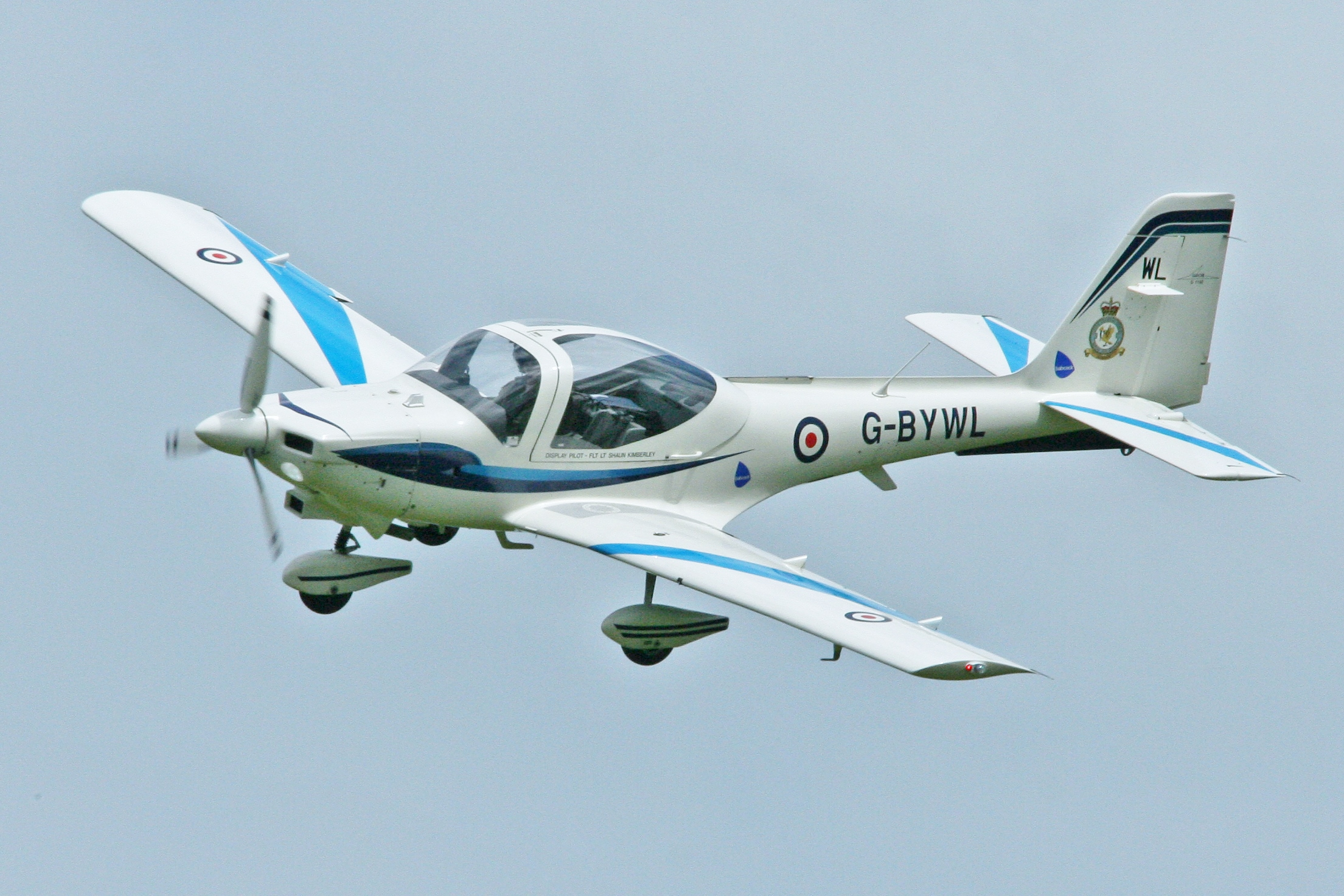
- Grob Tutor T1 of No. 16(R) Squadron, Royal Air Force

General information
- Type: Basic trainer
- Manufacturer: Grob Aircraft
- Status: active
- Primary users: Royal Air Force Egyptian Air Force; Finnish Air Force; Royal Navy; Army Air Corps (UK)

History
- Manufactured: 1985–present
- Introduction date: 1999
- First flight: November 1985

The Grob G 115 is a general aviation fixed-wing aircraft, primarily used for flight training. It is built in Germany by Grob Aircraft (Grob Aerospace before January 2009). The E variant with a 3-blade variable pitch propeller is in service with the Finnish Air Force, the Royal Navy and Army Air Corps for Flying Grading (a pre-EFT flying course) and in the Royal Air Force as part of No. 6 Flying Training School (6 FTS) which provides flying to both University Air Squadrons and Air Experience Flights to Cadets of the Royal Air Force Air Cadets. As of 2020, the Tutor is still being used by the RAF for some Elementary Flying Training (3FTS) but is due to be phased out in favour of its replacement, the more advanced Prefect T1.

== Design ==
The aircraft is constructed of carbon composite materials. The main fuselage and each wing spar is a single piece. It has a fixed (sprung steel) tricycle undercarriage with spatted wheels, a short nose housing the 180 horsepower (130 kilowatts) piston engine, and a 3-bladed variable-pitch propeller. The aircraft was re-certified in 2013 with a new MT Propeller following issues with the previous design. The inverted oil system was also redesigned to improve lubrication during aerobatics. The cockpit features a broad canopy arch and spine. Forward visibility is good. The side-by-side seats are fixed, and pilot seating is adjusted with cushions as well as a rudder bar adjuster. The wings are tapered with square tips, and the empennage consists of a large fin and rudder, with an oblong tailplane with square tips mid-set to the fuselage.

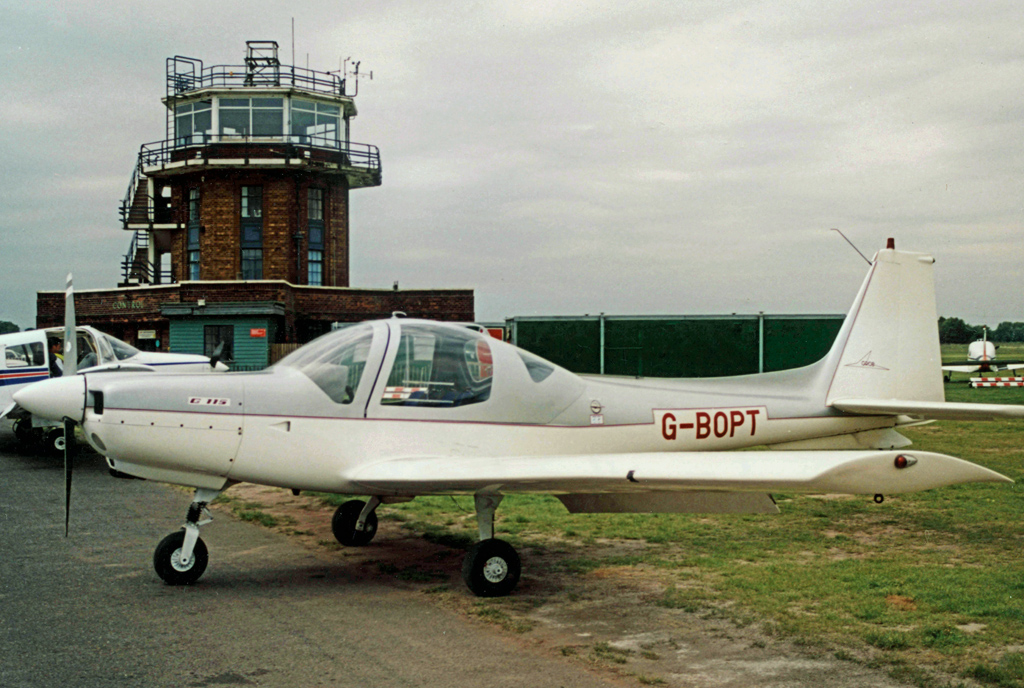
Grob G 115A of the Lancashire Aero Club at Manchester (Barton) Aerodrome in 2004 showing the vertical fin of this early version.

The initial Grob G 115 and G 115A models had an upright fin and rudder, and were mainly sold to civilian aeroplane clubs in Germany, the United Kingdom, and several other countries.

The aircraft is capable of basic aerobatic manoeuvres (limited to +6G and −3G).

== Grob 115D2 (Heron) ==
The Grob Heron was first bought by the Royal Navy. After its use, five were bought by Tayside Aviation. There are only six recorded Herons in existence; two (to be sold) operated by Tayside Aviation, three privately owned, and one in Germany. One was reported as written off after an accident.

== Grob 115E (Tutor) ==
With the retirement of the Scottish Aviation Bulldog T1 from Royal Air Force University Air Squadrons (UASs) and Air Experience Flights (AEFs), a new system was put in place for the provision of the UAS and AEF flying tasks. Aircraft were to be owned and operated by private industry, contracted to the Ministry of Defence (MoD). The aircraft chosen for this task was the Grob 115E, designated Tutor T1 by the MoD. The Tutor fleet is owned and maintained by a civilian company, Babcock International, and carries British civilian registrations under a Private Finance Initiative (PFI) scheme, painted overall white with blue flashes and UK military aircraft roundels.

Royal Navy, British Army, and Royal Air Force Elementary Flying Training (EFT), where students streamed according to ability: Fast Jet, Rotary Wing, Multi-Engine or non-pilot roles, was previously taught on the Grob Tutor at RAF Cranwell and RAF Barkston Heath by the joint 3 Flying Training School, with 703 Naval Air Squadron, 674 Squadron Army Air Corps, and 57 RAF Reserve Squadron, before being replaced in 2018 by the more advanced turboprop trainer, the Grob G120TP Prefect. Some 3FTS EFT training for various pipelines still continues on the Tutor on 16 Squadron at RAF Wittering.

Until 2005, the Tutor was used by UASs to provide EFT to university students, many sponsored by the RAF. From 2006, UAS students are no longer taught EFT; they follow an unassessed flying syllabus similar to EFT, but with only a 36 hour course and the possibility of progression to more advanced training on merit. The Tutor is also used by AEFs to provide flying experience for cadets of the Air Training Corps (ATC) and Combined Cadet Force (CCF), replacing the Bulldog in these roles at the turn of the century. The final AEF to receive the Tutor was 10 AEF, based at RAF Woodvale in Merseyside, in 2001. 10 AEF was incidentally also the last AEF to receive the Bulldog in 1996, replacing the Chipmunk T10.

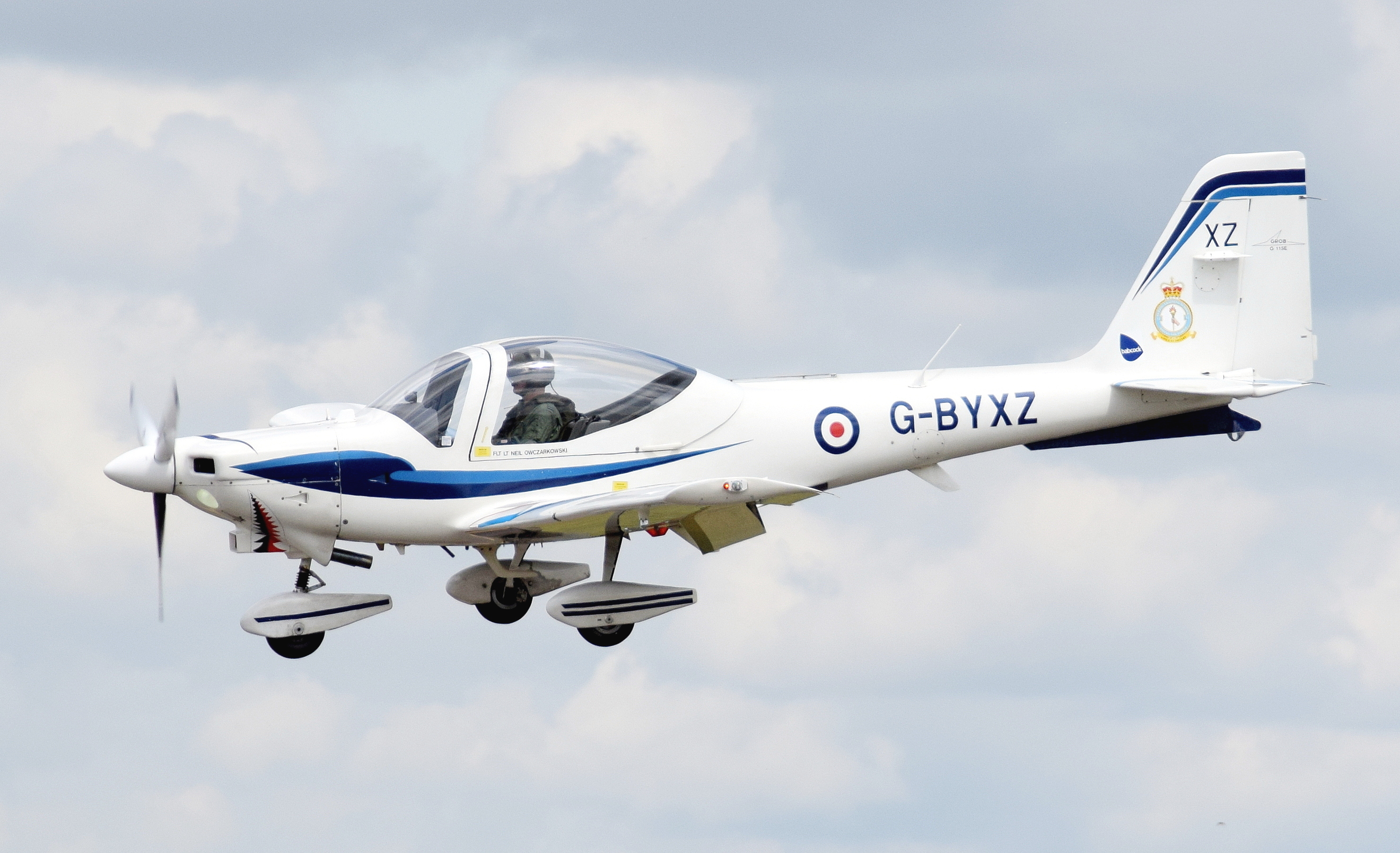
Grob G 115E Tutor T1 of the RAF arrives at the 2019 RIAT, England.

Five Tutor T1s are also operated by 727 Naval Air Squadron of the Royal Navy's Fleet Air Arm (FAA) for trainee pilot grading at RNAS Yeovilton.

In 2009, some Tutor squadrons began to receive new Enhanced Avionics (EA) Tutors, with an updated and enhanced instrument panel, featuring a Garmin GNS 430W GPS system, digital HSI, and digital engine instruments. These aircraft are the same as the standard Tutors, with the exception of an extra VHF aerial for the new GPS system and the cockpit modifications.

== Operators ==
Australia

- Flight Training Perth — 3 aircraft
- Royal Aero Club of Western Australia — 3 aircraft
- Flight Training Adelaide – 2 aircraft
- Australian Flying School – 8 aircraft
- China Southern West Australian Flying College – 38 aircraft (closed 2021, aircraft auctioned off.)
- Airspeed Flight School – 4 aircraft

Bangladesh

- Bangladesh Air Force - 3 aircraft.

Belgium

- Ostende Aviation college – 3 aircraft
- Aeroclub Keiheuvel – 1 aircraft

Canada

- Ottawa Aviation Services – 3 aircraft
- Journey Air, Windsor Ontario - 1 aircraft

Egypt

- Egyptian Air Force – 74 aircraft

Finland

- Finnish Air Force – 28 aircraft, bought from UK stocks

Kenya

- Kenyan Air Force – 3 aircraft

Norway

- Norwegian Aviation College – 4 aircraft

Portugal

- Aeronautical Web Academy – 6 aircraft

United Arab Emirates

- United Arab Emirates Air Force – 12 aircraft

United Kingdom

- Royal Air Force – 89 aircraft
  - No. 3 Flying Training School RAF – RAF Cranwell
    - No. 16 Squadron RAF – RAF Wittering
  - No. 6 Flying Training School RAF – RAF Cranwell
    - University of Birmingham Air Squadron – RAF Cosford
    - Bristol University Air Squadron – MoD Boscombe Down
    - Cambridge University Air Squadron – RAF Wittering
    - East Midlands Universities Air Squadron – RAF Cranwell
    - East of Scotland Universities Air Squadron – Leuchars Station
    - Universities of Glasgow and Strathclyde Air Squadron – Glasgow Airport
    - Liverpool University Air Squadron – RAF Woodvale
    - University of London Air Squadron – RAF Wittering
    - Manchester and Salford Universities Air Squadron – RAF Woodvale
    - Northumbrian Universities Air Squadron – RAF Leeming
    - Northern Ireland Universities Air Squadron – Aldergrove Flying Station
    - Oxford University Air Squadron – RAF Benson
    - Southampton University Air Squadron – MoD Boscombe Down
    - Universities of Wales Air Squadron – MoD St Athan
    - Yorkshire Universities Air Squadron – RAF Leeming
    - No. 1 Air Experience Flight RAF – MoD St Athan
    - No. 2 Air Experience Flight RAF – MoD Boscombe Down
    - No. 3 Air Experience Flight RAF – Colerne Airfield
    - No. 4 Air Experience Flight RAF – Glasgow Airport
    - No. 5 Air Experience Flight RAF – RAF Wittering
    - No. 6 Air Experience Flight RAF – RAF Benson
    - No. 7 Air Experience Flight RAF – RAF Cranwell
    - No. 8 Air Experience Flight RAF – RAF Cosford
    - No. 9 Air Experience Flight RAF – RAF Linton-on-Ouse
    - No. 10 Air Experience Flight RAF – RAF Woodvale
    - No. 11 Air Experience Flight RAF – RAF Leeming
    - No. 12 Air Experience Flight RAF – Leuchars Station
    - No. 13 Air Experience Flight RAF – Aldergrove Flying Station
    - No. 115 Squadron RAF - RAF Wittering
- Royal Navy - 5 aircraft
  - 727 NAS – RNAS Yeovilton - used for Flying Grading
- British Army - withdrawn from service
  - Army Flying Grading School, Middle Wallop
- Almat Aviation - withdrawn from service
- Lancashire Aero Club
- Tayside Aviation – withdrawn from service
- Air Midwest - 1 aircraft, call sign G-GPSI, leased through Swift Air

== Specifications (G 115E) ==
Data from Jane's All the World's Aircraft 2004–2005

General characteristics

- Crew: 2
- Length: 7.79 m (25 ft 7 in)
- Wingspan: 10.00 m (32 ft 10 in)
- Height: 2.82 m (9 ft 3 in)
- Wing area: 12.21 m^{2} (131.4 sq ft)
- Aspect ratio: 8.2:1
- Airfoil: Eppler 696
- Empty weight: 670 kg (1,477 lb)
- Max takeoff weight: 990 kg (2,183 lb)
- Fuel capacity: 143 L (31 imp gal; 38 US gal) usable
- Powerplant: 1 × Lycoming AEIO-360-B1F/B 4-cylinder air-cooled horizontally-opposed piston engine, 130 kW (180 hp)
- Propellers: 3-bladed Hoffmann HO-V343K-V/183GY Constant-speed propeller, 1.83 m (6 ft 0 in) diameter

Performance

- Maximum speed: 250 km/h (160 mph, 130 kn)
- Cruise speed: 178 km/h (111 mph, 96 kn) (long range cruising speed)
- Stall speed: 91 km/h (57 mph, 49 kn) (60 degree flap)
- Never exceed speed: 341 km/h (212 mph, 184 kn)
- Range: 1,150 km (710 mi, 620 nmi) (45% power at FL80, 45 min reserves)
- Service ceiling: 6,095 m (20,000 ft)
- g limits: +6.0/-3.0
- Rate of climb: 5.3 m/s (1,050 ft/min)

== Incidents and accidents ==
- On 29 June 2004, an RAF Tutor (G-BYXJ) lost a propeller blade and its canopy in flight. The aircraft was landed unpowered in a field, where damage was also sustained to the undercarriage. Subsequent investigation revealed cracking in the propeller blade roots across the fleet, which was grounded for modifications. No-one was injured in the incident.
- On 11 February 2009, two RAF Tutors (G-BYUT and G-BYVN) operating air experience flights from RAF St Athan collided in mid-air. All four occupants were killed, an RAF pilot and a female Air Training Corps cadet in each aircraft. The two cadets killed were cousins aged 13 and 14, both were members of 1004 (Pontypridd) Squadron Air Training Corps.
- In June 2009, a Grob Tutor (G-BYXR) collided in mid-air with a civilian glider (G-CKHT). The two people in the Grob Tutor were killed. The glider pilot parachuted and survived.

== See also ==
Aircraft of comparable role, configuration, and era

- Aquila A 210
- Scottish Aviation Bulldog
- PAC CT/4 (Pacific Aerospace Limited)
- Slingsby Firefly

Related lists

- List of active United Kingdom military aircraft
- List of aircraft of the Royal Air Force
- List of civil aircraft
