= Manchester and Salford Universities Air Squadron =

University flying squadron of the Royal Air Force

- Active: 1941–present
- Country: United Kingdom
- Branch: Royal Air Force
- Role: Training
- Part of: No. 6 Flying Training School
- Garrison/HQ: RAF Woodvale

Aircraft flown
- Trainer: Grob Tutor T1

Manchester and Salford Universities Air Squadron, abbreviated MASUAS, forms part of the Royal Air Force Volunteer Reserve. MASUAS is one of fifteen University Air Squadrons that are spread out across Great Britain and it recruits from the universities in Manchester (University of Manchester and Manchester Metropolitan University) and Salford University.

== History ==
In June 1958, it won the De Havilland trophy, for the third time, in which university air squadrons competed for, with aerobatics skills.

== Alumni ==
- Sqn Ldr John Peters, UMIST Building Technology, Gulf War pilot, shot down in Tornado ZD791 on 17 January 1991 with John Nichol
- Sqn Ldr Brian Mercer AFC, leader of the 92 Sqn 'Blue Diamonds', formerly leader of the Treble-One Black Arrows
- Flt Lt Richard Walker, modern languages at the University of Manchester, Red Arrows
- Flt Lt Nick Critchell aerospace business systems at Salford University, joined the RAF in 2008, Red Arrows from 2020, aged 33
- Flt Lt Tom Bould, University of Manchester, Aerospace Engineering, joined the RAF in 2005, Red Arrows from 2015, aged 32, team leader until 2023
- Flt Lt Andrew McEwen, Red Arrows from 2025, University of Manchester, Architecture

== Incidents ==
- Saturday 27 June 1953 10.45am, from Woodvale, 'WD326' crashed at Malham Moor, killing both, instructor 35 year old Flying Officer Kenneth Bernard Vallance, a lecturer in Botany at the University of Liverpool, of Great Crosby who had attended Burnley Grammar School, and 27 year old Pilot Officer Frank Reddish, of Rocky Lane in Monton. Some University of Liverpool students were on an ecology field survey in the area. He performed a roll, but lost height, and crashed inverted. The pilot had only been authorised to fly within 15 miles of Woodvale, at most. Vallance had flown, non-combat, in the war.
- A training aircraft XX712 crashed on Wednesday 2 March 1988 at Southport seafront, killing the pilot. 20 yr Mark Davies was from Southport, at Salford University, studying aircraft engineering The pilot who trained Mark to fly was Flt Lt John Burge; his son Robert would be killed in a crash on 16 October 1992, when his son was the commanding officer of the Northern Ireland Universities Air Squadron.

== See also ==
- University Air Squadron units
- University Royal Naval Unit, the Royal Navy equivalent
- Officers Training Corps, the British Army equivalent
- List of Royal Air Force aircraft squadrons
