= No. 13 Air Experience Flight RAF =

Air Experience Flight of No. 6 Flying Training School RAF

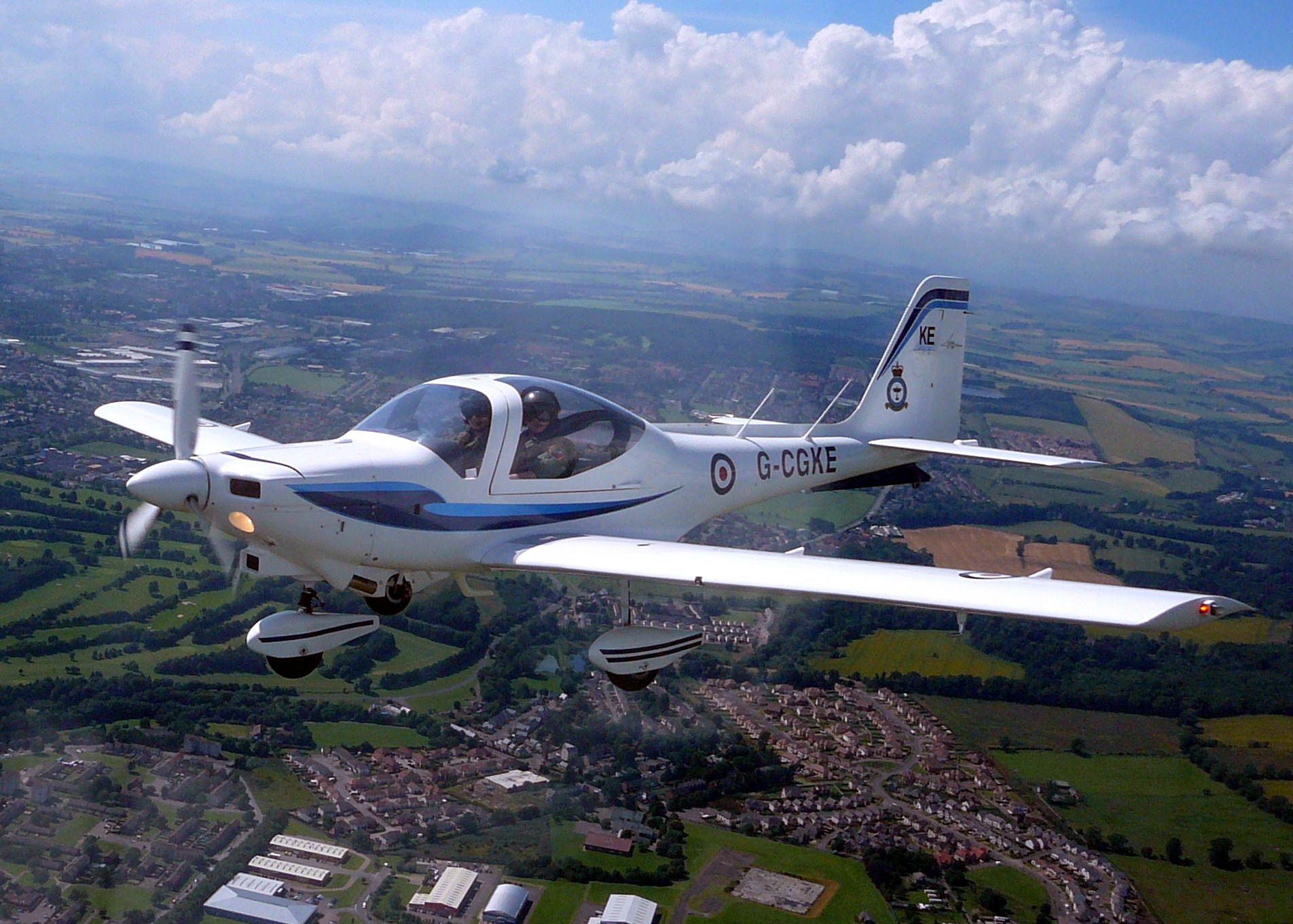
- Grob Tutor aircraft similar to that flown by 13 AEF
- Country: United Kingdom
- Allegiance: Royal Air Force
- Role: Training
- Part of: No. 6 Flying Training School RAF
- Garrison/HQ: Aldergrove Flying Station

Aircraft flown
- Trainer: Grob Tutor

No. 13 Air Experience Flight (AEF) is an Air Experience Flight of No. 6 Flying Training School RAF, based at Aldergrove Flying Station in Northern Ireland. Sharing three Grob Tutor T1 trainer aircraft with the Northern Ireland Universities Air Squadron it offers flight experiences to cadets of the Air Training Corps and the RAF elements of the Combined Cadet Force. It was established in 2019, more than 22 years after the previous Northern Ireland AEF had been disbanded.

== Operational role ==
13 AEF's role is to provide experience of flying to Royal Air Force Air Cadets (which includes the Air Training Corps and the RAF elements of the Combined Cadet Force). The AEF allows cadets to control the flight of an aircraft, under supervision of its commander, at heights above 1,000 feet (300 m).

It currently flies three Grob Tutor T1 trainer aircraft, which it shares with Northern Ireland Universities Air Squadron (NIUAS). 13 AEF uses Royal Air Force Volunteer Reserve pilots and had 17 pilots on its staff in 2020. It aims to offer an air experience flight every year to every cadet in Northern Ireland.

== History ==
An Air Experience Flight had operated in Northern Ireland until the late 1990s but was disbanded. After this air cadets wishing to take part in a powered flight had to travel to No. 10 Air Experience Flight RAF (at RAF Woodvale, Merseyside), No. 4 Air Experience Flight RAF (Glasgow Airport) or No. 12 Air Experience Flight RAF (RAF Leuchars, Fife). The University Air Squadron in Northern Ireland was previously Queen's University Air Squadron and was also disbanded in the late 1990s. It was reformed as NIUAS in November 2015.

Alternative cadet flying provision in the UK was provided via the Volunteer Gliding Squadron. Airworthiness concerns grounded the gliding fleet in 2014 and it was decided that thereafter a reduced gliding provision would be offered. In March 2016 Julian Brazier, Parliamentary Under Secretary of State for Reserves, announced that the AEF and University Air Squadron programme would be expanded to make up the shortfall. An additional 25 Grob Tutor aircraft would be procured and two new AEFs established, 13 AEF and 14 AEF. At this point, it was considered that 14 AEF would be the Northern Ireland flight. Actually the Northern Ireland AEF was established as No. 13 Air Experience Flight RAF. It reached full operating capacity, alongside NIUAS, on 25 February 2019. It was more than 22 years since an AEF had operated in Northern Ireland. The occasion was marked with flypasts of Typhoon and F-35 aircraft.
