= No. 7 Air Experience Flight RAF =

Air Cadets air experience flight

7 Air Experience Flight
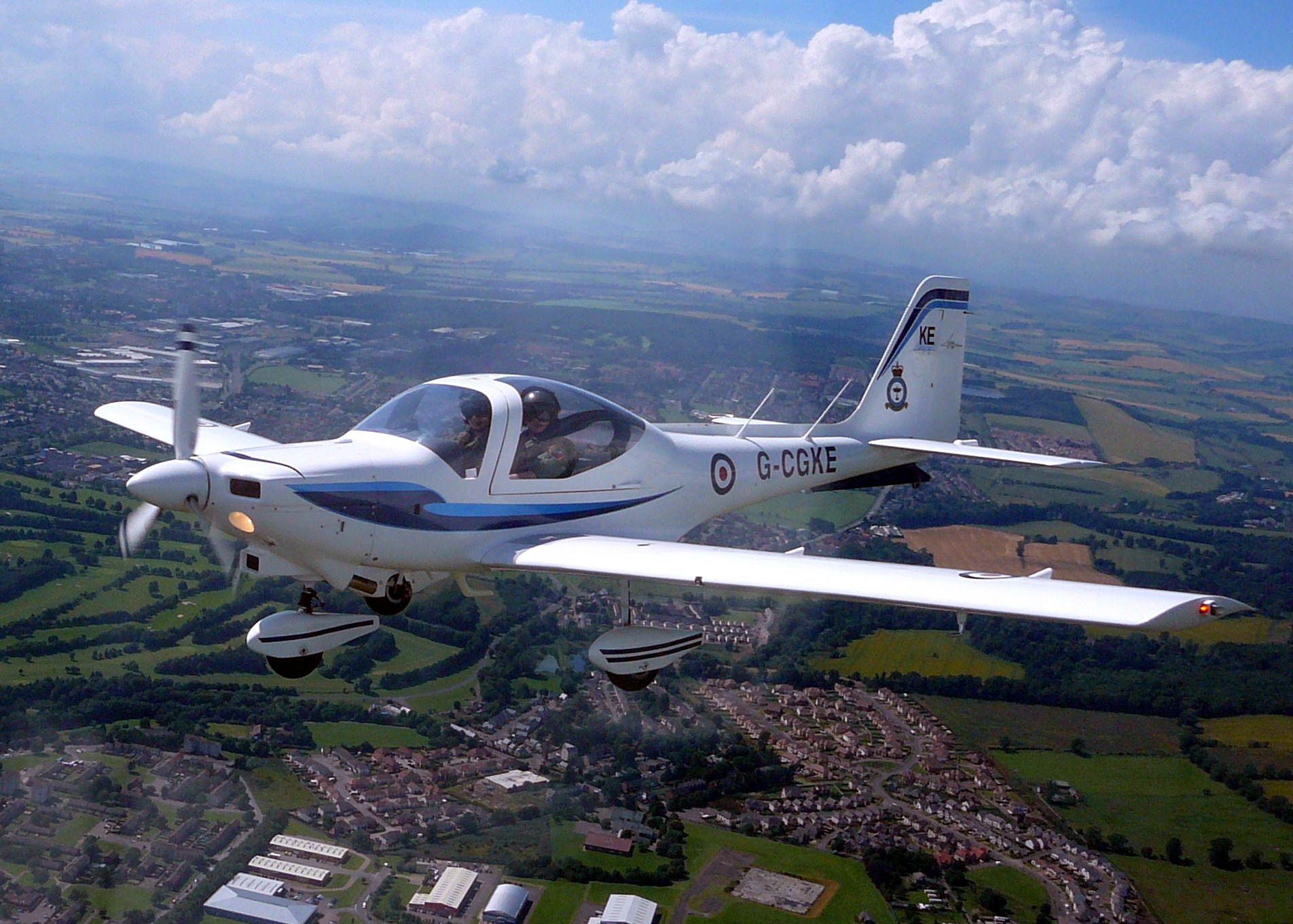
- Grob Tutor aircraft similar to that flown by 7 AEF
- Active: 8 September 1958 - Present
- Country: United Kingdom
- Allegiance: Royal Air Force
- Branch: Air Cadet Organisation
- Role: Training
- Part of: No. 6 Flying Training School RAF
- Garrison/HQ: RAF Cranwell

Aircraft flown
- Trainer: Grob Tutor T.1

No. 7 Air Experience Flight (7 AEF) offers air experience flights to the air training corps the combined cadet force and is a university air squadron.].

== History ==
No. 7 AEF formed on 8 September 1958 at RAF Newton in Nottinghamshire, equipped with de Havilland Chipmunk T.10 aircraft.

It later moved to RAF Cranwell with the Grob Tutor T.1.
