= Aldergrove Flying Station =

British Army Flying Station in Northern Ireland

- Aldergrove, County Antrim in Northern Ireland
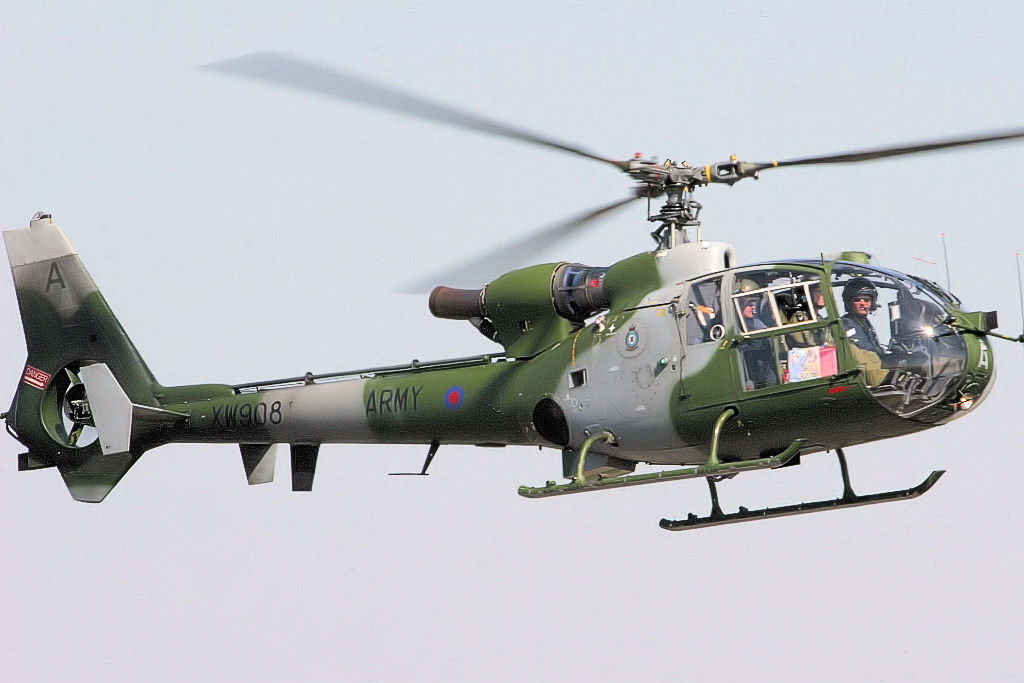
- Westland Gazelle AH1 of the type formerly based at Aldergrove.

Site information
- Type: Military airport
- Code: JV
- Owner: Ministry of Defence
- Controlled by: Joint Aviation Command formerly: RAF Fighter Command * No. 13 Group RAF; RAF Coastal Command * No. 17 Group RAF
- Condition: Operational
- Website: Official website

Location
- Location within Northern Ireland Aldergrove Flying Station (the United Kingdom)
- Coordinates: 54°38′58″N 006°13′31″W
- Area: 96 hectares (240 acres)

Site history
- Built: 1918
- In use: Royal Air Force (1918–2009); British Army (2009 – present)
- Battles/wars: First World War; European theatre of World War II; Cold War; Operation Banner (1969–2007)

Airfield information
- Identifiers: IATA: BFS, ICAO: EGAA, WMO: 03917
- Elevation: 69 metres (226 ft) AMSL
Runways
Direction	Length and surface
07/25	2,780 metres (9,121 ft) asphalt
17/35	1,891 metres (6,204 ft) asphalt
- Source: UK AIP Belfast Aldergrove; Airfield shared with Belfast International Airport

Aldergrove Flying Station, also known previously as JHC FS Aldergrove, is a British military base located 4.4 miles (7.1 km) south of Antrim, Northern Ireland and 18 miles (29 km) northwest of Belfast, and adjoins Belfast International Airport. It is sometimes referred to simply as Aldergrove which is the name of a nearby hamlet.

The military flying units share Aldergrove's runways with Belfast International Airport, but have their own separate facilities and helipad.

The site was formerly RAF Aldergrove, a Royal Air Force station which was in operation between 1918 and 2009.

== History ==
=== Interwar period ===
RAF Aldergrove first opened in 1918 but was not designated as an operational RAF station until 1925.

Various squadrons were posted here during this time:

- A detachment of No. 4 Squadron RAF between 30 April 1920 and 26 September 1922 again with the Bristol F2B.
- No. 2 Squadron RAF initially at full strength between 2 June 1922 and 27 September 1922 and then as a detachment until 17 September 1923 flying the Bristol F2B Fighter.
- No. 502 Squadron RAF was formed here on 15 May 1925 and used various aircraft types including Vickers Vimy's, Handley Page Hyderabad's, Virginia X's, Westland Wallace's, Hawker Hind's, Avro Anson I's, Blackburn Botha I's and Armstrong Whitworth Whitley V's until 27 January 1941.
- A detachment of No. 214 Squadron RAF between 15 October 1935 and 1 October 1936 with the Virginia X.
- No. 9 Squadron RAF between 15 January 1936 and 1 October 1936 initially flying the Vickers Virginia X until April 1936 when they started converting to the Handley Page Heyford III.
- No. 85 Squadron RAF with the Hawker Hurricane I between 18 October 1938 and 4 November 1938.

=== Second World War ===
Aldergrove's location made it an important station of RAF Coastal Command in the Battle of the Atlantic, during the Second World War. From the base, long-range reconnaissance aircraft were able to patrol the Eastern Atlantic Ocean for U-boats. Some of these patrols ranged as far out as the distant islet of Rockall.

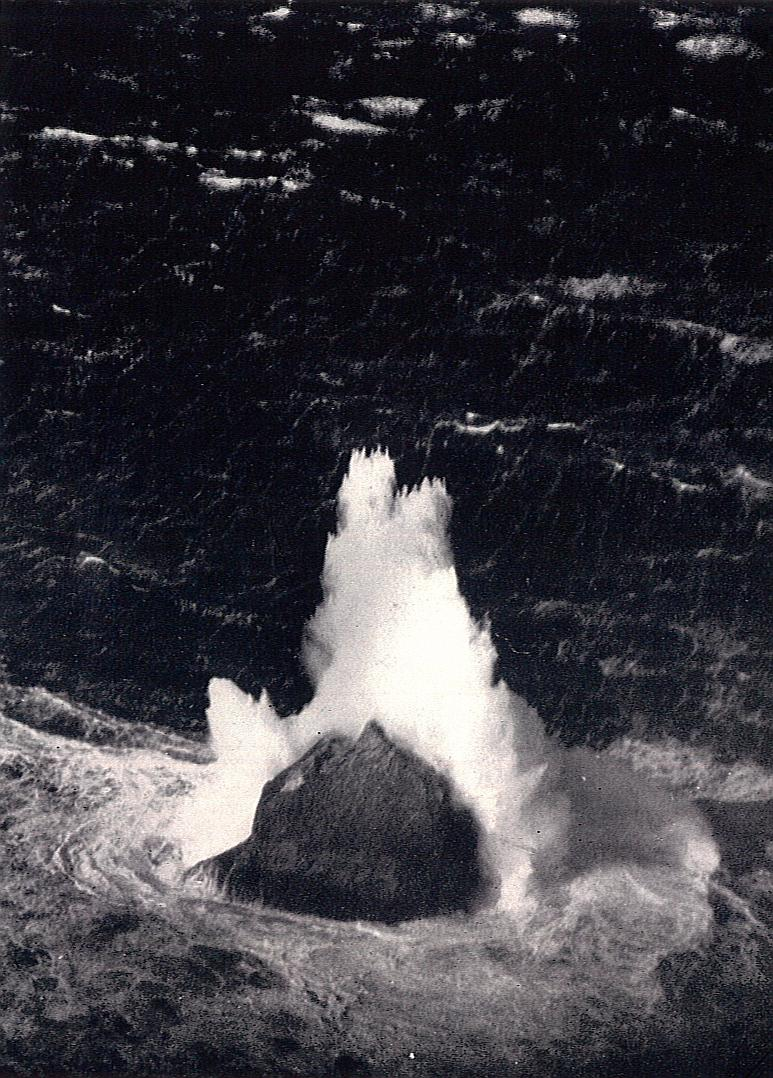
A picture taken of Rockall by an RAF crew based at Aldergrove on 11 March 1943

Various squadrons were posted here during this time:

- A detachment of No. 224 Squadron RAF between 1 September 1938 and 15 April 1941 with Lockheed Hudson I and III version's.
- A detachment of No. 235 Squadron RAF with the Bristol Blenheim IVF between 24 June 1940 and 4 June 1941.
- No. 231 Squadron RAF between 1 July 1940 and 15 July 1940 with the Westland Lysander II.
- No. 245 Squadron RAF with Hurricane I between 20 July 1940 and 14 July 1941.
- No. 233 Squadron RAF between 3 August 1940 and 14 September 1940 with the Hudson I.
- No. 102 Squadron RAF with the Whitley V between 1 September 1940 and 10 October 1940.
- No. 272 Squadron RAF reformed here on 18 November 1940 with the Blenheim IVF and stayed until 3 April 1941.
- No. 252 Squadron RAF between 6 April 1941 and 15 June 1941 with Beaufighter IC.
- No. 254 Squadron RAF using Blenheim IVF between 29 May 1941 and 12 December 1941.
- No. 143 Squadron RAF reformed here on 15 June 1941 with the Bristol Beaufighter IC, and stayed here until 24 March 1944.
- A detachment of No. 48 Squadron RAF between 3 August 1941 and 20 October 1941 with the Lockheed Hudson V & III's.
- No. 206 Squadron RAF between 12 August 1941 and 1 July 1942 using various versions of the Hudson, including the I/II/III/IV and V.
- No. 311 Squadron RAF between 28 April 1942 and 12 June 1942 with the Vickers Wellington IC.
- A detachment of No. 120 Squadron RAF between 21 July 1942 and 24 March 1944 with the Liberator III.
- No. 220 Squadron RAF with Boeing Fortress II between 14 February 1943 and 30 March 1943.
- No. 86 Squadron RAF between 18 March 1943 and 6 September 1943 using the Liberator IIIA & V versions.
- No. 59 Squadron RAF between 11 May 1943 and 15 September 1943 with the Consolidated Liberator V's.
- A detachment of No. 547 Squadron RAF between 25 October 1943 and 13 June 1944 with Wellington XI and XIII's and Liberator V's.

=== Post war ===
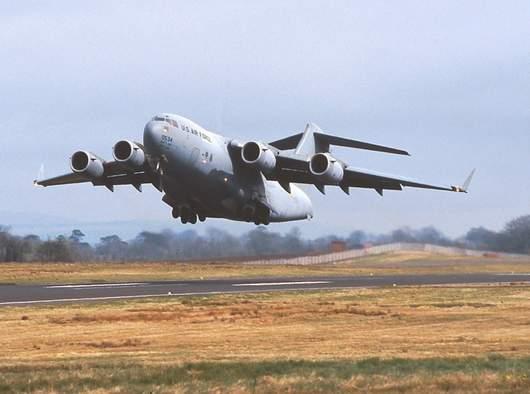
United States Air Force (USAF) Boeing C-17 Globemaster III operating from Aldergrove in support of U.S. presidential visit, 2003.

Aldergrove was designated as a dispersal airfield for the RAF's V bomber force in the 1950s and was included in a reduced list of 26 airfields in 1962. In 1968 No. 23 Maintenance Unit RAF was responsible for the maintenance of McDonnell Douglas F-4 Phantom IIs in RAF service, with 116 aircraft passing through on their way to front-line service. Aldergrove was also the main servicing and reconditioning station for the English Electric Canberra from its introduction in 1951. In 1976, the station had a staff of 2,500 RAF personnel and 1,500 civilians.

Various squadrons were posted here between 1945 and 1985:

- No. 518 Squadron RAF operated the Halifax III, Hurricane IIC, Spitfire VII and Halifax VI between 18 September 1945 and 1 October 1946 when the squadron was disbanded here.
- A detachment of No. 280 Squadron RAF between 3 November 1945 and 21 June 1946 when it was disbanded. It operated the Vickers Warwick I.
- No. 502 Squadron RAF reformed here on 10 May 1946 and operated various aircraft types including de Havilland Mosquito B.25 & NF.30's, Supermarine Spitfire F.22's and de Havilland Vampire F.3's, FB.5's and FB.9's until 10 March 1957.
- No. 202 Squadron RAF with the Halifax GR.6, A.9 and Met 1 version's from 1 October 1946 and 28 August 1964 when it was disbanded.
- No. 214 Squadron RAF reformed here on 1 March 1948 and operated the Handley Page Halifax GR.6 until 18 October 1948.
- No. 240 Squadron RAF reformed here on 1 May 1952 with the Avro Shackleton MR.1 and stayed until 27 May 1952.
- A detachment of No. 275 Squadron RAF between 18 November 1954 and 1 September 1959 when it was disbanded. The detachment operated the Hiller HTE-2, Anson T.21, de Havilland Canada DHC-1 Chipmunk T.10, Sycamore HR.14, Westland Whirlwind HAR.4 & 2.
- No. 1913 Light Liaison Flight of No. 651 Squadron RAF between 1 November 1955 and 4 April 1957 operated the Taylorcraft Auster AOP.6. The flight was renamed 13 Flight No. 651 Squadron AAC on 1 September 1957 and stayed here until November 1952 when it was replaced by 2 Reconnaissance Flight, 2 Royal Tank Regiment.
- No. 118 Squadron RAF reformed here on 1 September 1959 with Bristol Sycamore HR.14 before being disbanded here on 31 August 1962.

==== Royal Air Force operations ====
No. 72 Squadron operated Westland Wessex HC.2 helicopters from Aldergrove from 12 November 1981 until its disbandment in 2002.

No. 230 Squadron RAF was re-deployed from Germany to RAF Aldergrove in 1992, where it operated Westland Puma HC.1 helicopters until its relocation to RAF Benson in November 2009.

No. 18 Squadron RAF also operated detachments of Boeing Chinook during the late 80s in support of the British Army in Northern Ireland.

The following units were here at some point:

- No. 1 Armament Training Camp RAF (November 1941 - September 1945)
- No. 1 (Coastal) Engine Control Demonstration Unit RAF (December 1943 - April 1944)
- Liberator Conversion Flight from No. 1 (Coastal) Operational Training Unit RAF (September 1943 - October 1943)
- No. 2 Armament Training Camp RAF (October 1936 - April 1938) became No. 2 Armament Training Station RAF (April 1938 - April 1939) became No. 3 Air Observers School RAF (April 1939 - December 1939) became No. 3 Bombing & Gunnery School RAF (December 1939 - July 1940)
- No. 4 Coastal Patrol Flight RAF (December 1939)
- Advanced Training Squadron from No. 5 Service Flying Training School RAF (October 1939 - November 1939)
- No. 9 (Coastal) OTU RAF (June 1942 - September 1942)
- No. 15 Group Communication Flight RAF
- No. 22 Air Crew Holding Unit RAF
- No. 23 Maintenance Unit RAF (December 1939 - April 1978)
- No. 61 Group RAF (July 1940) became HQ RAF Northern Ireland
- No. 67 Group Communication Flight RAF (April 1950 - January 1957)
- No. 67 (Northern Ireland Reserve) Group RAF (April 1950 - June 1950)
- No. 203 Gliding School RAF (June 1949 - Speptember 1949)
- A detachment from No. 226 Maintenance Unit RAF
- No. 278 Maintenance Unit RAF (May 1948 - September 1957)
- No. 402 Meteorological Flight RAF (January 1941 - March 1941) became No. 1402 (Meteorological) Flight RAF (March 1941 - December 1944)
- No. 1405 (Meteorological) Flight RAF then absorbed by No. 1402 Met Flight. (March 1941 - February 1942)
- No. 665 Squadron AAC
- No. 671 Volunteer Gliding Squadron RAF (1958 - January 1959)
- No. 1361 (Meteorological) Flight RAF absorbed by No. 521 Squadron RAF (January - February 1946)
- No. 1362 (Meteorological) Flight RAF (January - February 1946)
- No. 1363 (Meteorological) Flight RAF (January - February 1946)
- No. 1364 (Meteorological) Flight RAF(January - February 1946)
- No. 1674 Heavy Conversion Unit RAF (October 1943)
- No. 2707 Squadron RAF Regiment
- No. 2850 Squadron RAF Regiment
- Queens University Air Squadron (October 1946 - March 1947 & January 1992 - July 1996)
- RAF Northern Ireland Communication Flight RAF (December 1946 - March 1950)

==== Army Air Corps operations ====
The Army Air Corps also operated Westland Lynx and Westland Gazelle helicopters as well as de Havilland Canada DHC-2 Beaver aircraft in its joint operations with the RAF's Reconnaissance Intelligence Centre (Northern Ireland); the Beaver was replaced by the Britten-Norman Islander late in 1988.

The 17/21st Lancers Air Squadron based at RAF Aldergrove from 1969 to 1971 operating with Sioux Helicopters and a Fixed Wing Beaver aircraft.

During 1991, No. 655 Squadron AAC moved from RAF Ballykelly to Aldergrove with the Westland Lynx AH Mk 7 helicopter.

On 1 October 1993, the Northern Ireland Regiment Army Air Corps was retitled 5 Regiment Army Air Corps.

On 4 August 2008, 651 Squadron Army Air Corps moved back to Northern Ireland from RAF Odiham almost 50 years after its first deployment there.

==== Post Operation Banner ====
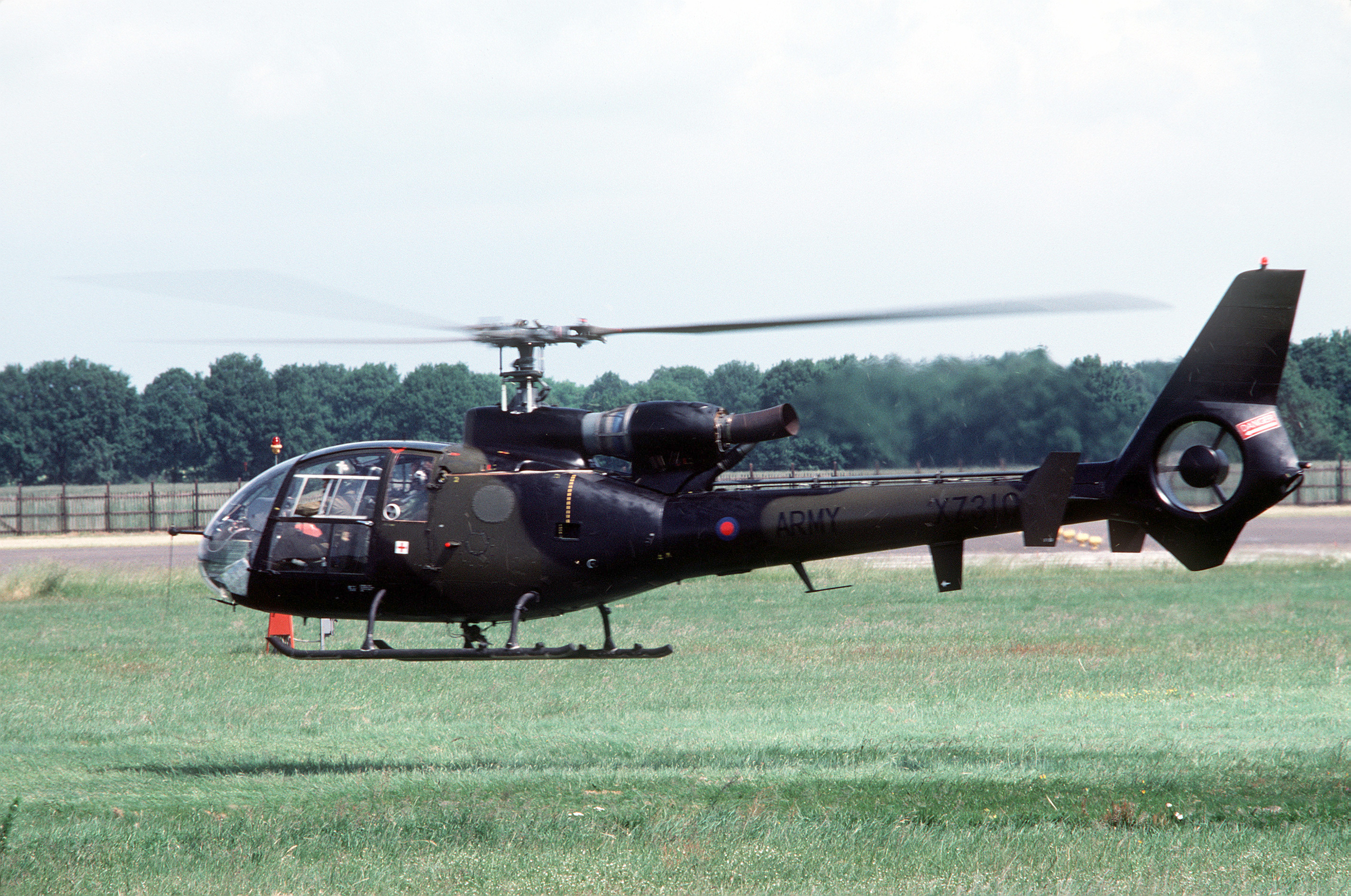
A British Army Air Corps Gazelle helicopter.

During the latter years of Operation Banner, 5 Regiment Army Air Corps and 230 Squadron RAF came under the control of the Joint Helicopter Command (JHC) and formed the Joint Helicopter Force Northern Ireland (JHF(NI)). As the site was no longer a major RAF establishment it became Joint Helicopter Command Flying Station Aldergrove.

After the end of Operation Banner, a number of other Army units were relocated to Aldergrove. The base was no longer therefore administered by the JHC and on 1 Apr 2013 became Aldergrove Flying Station under command of 38 (Irish) Brigade.

5 Regiment Army Air Corps continued to operate at Aldergrove, providing Gazelle, Defender and Islander aircraft in support of the Police Service of Northern Ireland (PSNI) and military units for Operation Helvetic, and for other operations abroad.

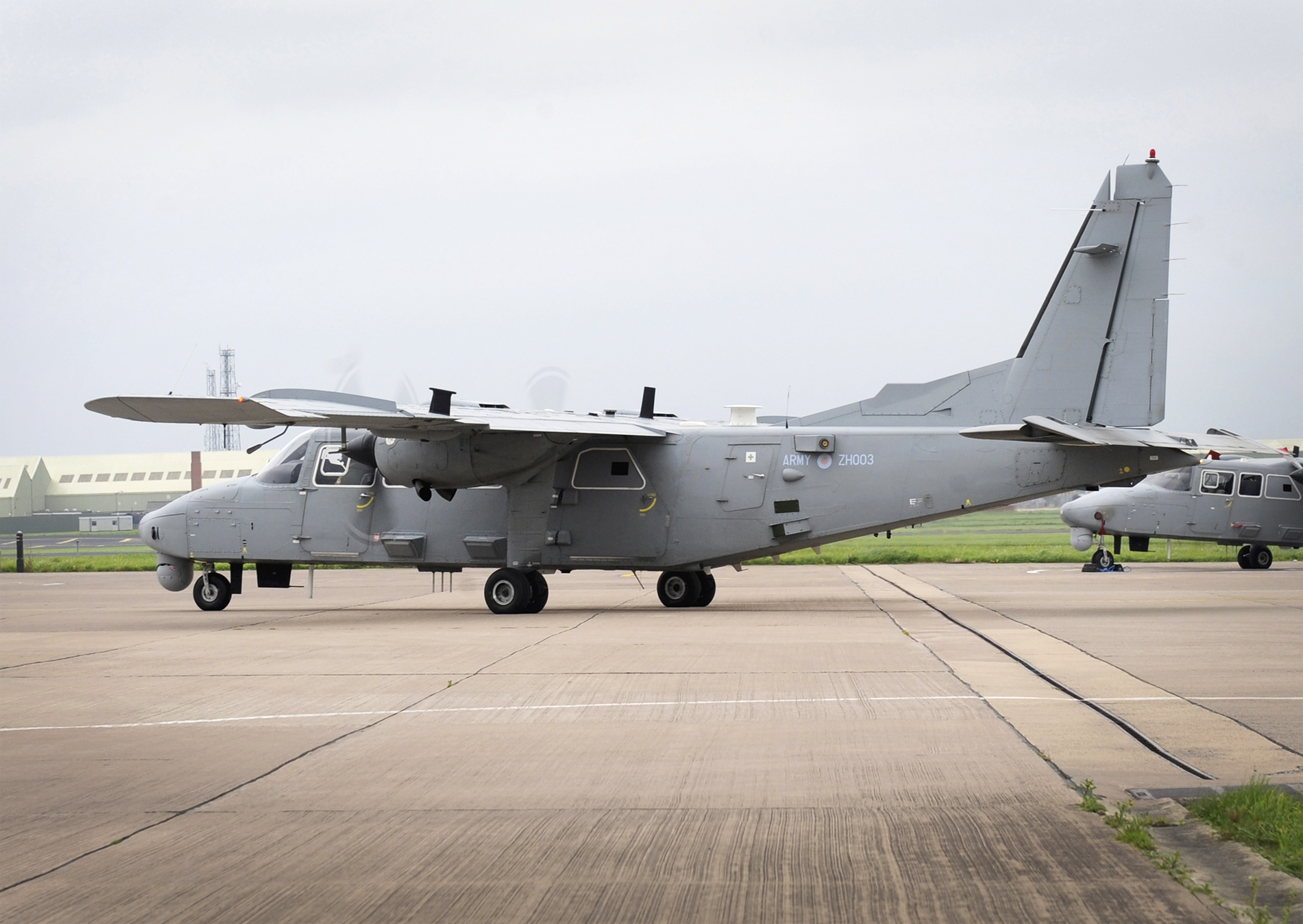
Britten-Norman Defender landing at Aldergrove in 2013.

Due to the closure of RAF Machrihanish, the base is now used for University Air Squadron and Air Training Corps cadets as a training camp, where cadets from Scotland and Northern Ireland gather for flying experiences, fieldcraft, shooting, first aid and other activities.

In 2003, Air Force One arrived at the airport in support of U.S. presidential visits to Northern Ireland.

Aldergrove officially ceased to be an RAF Station on 20 September 2009 when, after the annual Battle of Britain parade, the RAF ensign was lowered for the last time and the Joint Helicopter Command flag was hoisted in its place.

No. 651 Squadron's Britten-Norman Islander and Defender aircraft were retired from service in June 2021. In August 2021, No. 651 Squadron was transferred to the command of 1 Regiment, AAC.

No. 665 Squadron was the final Army Air Corps squadron based at Aldergrove. It formerly operated the Gazelle helicopter in a manned surveillance role, until it was retired from service in October 2023. By November 2024, the squadron had moved to Middle Wallop Flying Station.

== Based units ==
Units based at Aldergrove:

=== British Army ===
Royal Logistics Corps

- 11 Explosive Ordnance Disposal and Search Regiment
  - 321 Explosive Ordnance Disposal & Search Squadron

=== Civilian ===
- Police Service of Northern Ireland
  - Air Support Unit – Eurocopter EC135 and Eurocopter EC145

=== Royal Air Force ===
No. 1 Group (Air Combat)

- No. 1 Intelligence Surveillance and Reconnaissance (ISR) Wing
  - No. 3 ISR Squadron (Regional Intelligence Geographic Centre-Northern Ireland)
- No. 502 (Ulster) Squadron (Royal Auxiliary Air Force)

No. 22 Group (Training) RAF

- No. 6 Flying Training School
  - Northern Ireland Universities Air Squadron – Grob Tutor T1
  - No. 13 Air Experience Flight RAF – Grob Tutor T1

== See also ==
- List of former Royal Air Force stations
- RAF Nutts Corner
- List of airfields of the Army Air Corps (United Kingdom)
