= Tayside Aviation =

Flight school in Scotland

Tayside Aviation was one of Scotland’s leading flight schools. Founded in February 1968, the Dundee-based aviation school was a UK CAA Approved Flight Training Organisation and trained pilots for over five decades before it ceased trading on 20 April 2023.

The flight school delivered a range of aviation courses including a Private Pilot Level (LAPL PPL) to Commercial Pilot Level (CPL, MEP, IR and MCC) AND Flight Instructor Training (FIC, IRI, CRI) on a full-time or part-time basis.

Tayside Aviation was the first flight school to be awarded an RAF Flying Scholarship in 1978 and in 1994 the school became the sole UK contractor for the Flying Scholarship Scheme, training over 500 cadets per year with the support of seven sub-contractors throughout the UK. The school was awarded the prestigious Royal Air Force Central Flying School Trophy by the Honourable Company of Air Pilots for demonstrating excellence in flight training.

Tayside Aviation’s Dundee base had 20 light aircraft, classroom training facilities and engineering support services. The flight school was unique in that it was one of only a few ATO’s in the UK where all training could be completed on the one site.

In December 2021 Tayside Aviation was bought by ARB Aviation, a company set up by business man Tony Banks.

In 2022, Tayside Aviation become the official sponsor of Celtic FC Women’s team with the aim of encouraging more females into aviation and sport.

== Collapse of business ==
In April 2023 the company was placed into administration causing trainee pilots to suffer significant financial loss.
