= RAF Newton =

Former Royal Air Force station in Nottinghamshire, England

RAF Newton
- Near Bingham, Nottinghamshire in England
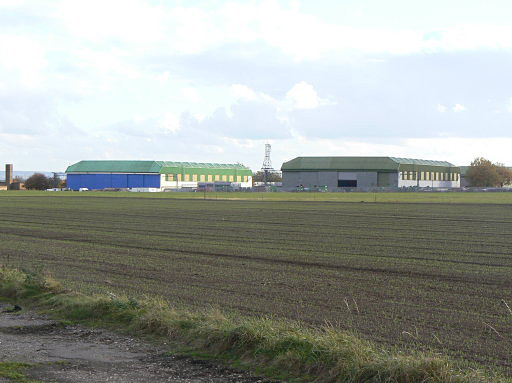
- Aircraft hangars at former RAF Newton during 2009

- Docemus et discimus (Latin for 'We teach and we learn')

Site information
- Type: Royal Air Force station
- Owner: Ministry of Defence
- Operator: Royal Air Force
- Condition: Closed

Location
- Location in Nottinghamshire
- Coordinates: 52°57′59″N 000°59′22″W

Site history
- Built: 1939
- In use: 1939 – 2000
- Fate: Site sold and redeveloped for residential-led mixed-use development, former aircraft hangars retained

Airfield information
- Identifiers: IATA: EGXN, WMO: 035905
- Elevation: 55 metres (180 ft) AMSL
Runways
| Direction | Length and surface |
|---|---|
| 07/25 | 1,230 metres (4,035 ft) Grass |
| 13/31 | 770 metres (2,526 ft) Grass |
| 01/19 | 770 metres (2,526 ft) Grass |

Royal Air Force Newton or more simply RAF Newton (ICAO: EGXN) is a former Royal Air Force station located 7 miles (11 km) east of Nottingham, Nottinghamshire and 10.7 miles (17.2 km) south west of Newark-on-Trent, Nottinghamshire, England. It was used briefly as a bomber base for squadrons to re-equip after the Battle of France and then as a flying training school during the Second World War and beyond until 2000.

== History ==
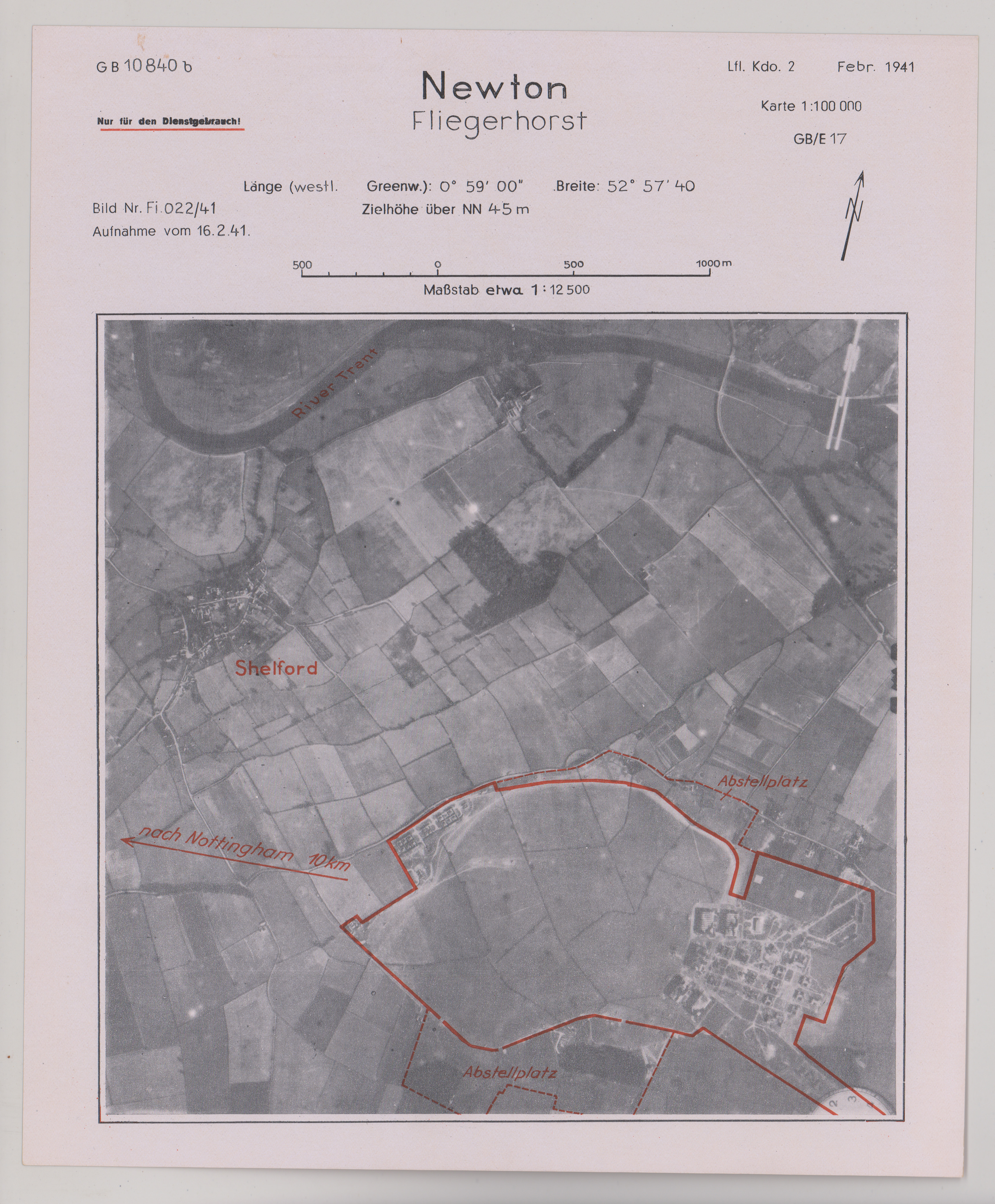
RAF Newton on a target dossier of the German Luftwaffe, 1941

=== Second World War ===
Built in 1939, Newton was assigned to No 1 Group in June 1940. On 3 July 1940 No. 103 Squadron RAF moved from RAF Honington with their Fairey Battles before changing to the Vickers Wellington IC in October 1940. On 11 July 1941 the squadron moved to RAF Elsham Wolds, also on 3 July 1940 (the same date when 103 Squadron arrived) No. 150 Squadron RAF arrived from RAF Stradishall again initially with the Battle before changing to Wellington IA during October 1940 however later in the month the Wellington IC was introduced to the squadron. The squadron left on 10 July 1941 going to RAF Snaith.

Newton then became a training base, and for the next five years between July 1941 and December 1946 No. 16 (Polish) Service Flying Training School provided basic and advanced training for Polish airmen serving with the RAF, using RAF Tollerton as a satellite landing ground.

The following units were posted to Newton during this time:

- Ground Defence Sqn between April and 19 December 1941.
- No. 722 Ground Defence Sqn between 19 December 1941 and 1 February 1942.
- No. 2722 between 1 February 1942 and unknown.
- Detachment, No. 2 Flying Instructors School between 10 September 1943 and 9 February 1944.

=== Post-war ===
The station became the headquarters of No 12 Group, Fighter Command from 1946 until 1958, when Technical Training Command took over the station for electronic fitters courses.

Later the station became the home of the RAF School of Education, who moved from RAF Upwood in 1972, and the RAF Police Training School, who moved from RAF Debden in 1974 bringing their gate guardian – a Hawker Hunter F1, WT694 (now at Caernarfon Air World) – with them. Both of these units transferred to RAF Halton in the 1990s.

The station has been home to the Headquarters Air Cadets (HQAC) (which included the Air Training Corps, and the RAF Sections of the Combined Cadet Force) which later moved to RAF Cranwell in 1995, the same year, the RAF Police Dog School based there since 1975 was amalgamated with the RAVC to form the Defence Animal Centre (DAC) at Melton Mowbray.

The station badge featured the Polish Eagle holding a flaming torch in each talon with the motto "Docemus et Discimus" which translates as "We teach and we learn", reflecting the Polish training role in the Second World War.

The station had also become the home of the newly formed Nottingham University College Air Squadron in 1941, providing newly trained pilots for the RAF. During the 1960s Newton was home to an Air Experience Flight of de Havilland Canada DHC-1 Chipmunk aircraft which were used by local squadrons of the Air Training Corps and cadets of the RAF Sections of the Combined Cadet Force. The East Midlands University Air Squadron continued flying at Newton, with Scottish Aviation Bulldog aircraft, until moving its flying activities to RAF Cranwell in 2001. In the latter years, civilian-operated Slingsby Fireflies were also based at Newton for basic military training on behalf of RAF Cranwell.

=== Other units ===
The following units were posted to Newton during this time:

- HQ, No 12 Group between 20 December 1946 and 14 August 1959.
- No. 12 Group Communications Flt between December 1946 and 14 August 1959.
- No. 47 Gliding School between 1947 and 1 September 1955.
- No. 58 Maintenance Unit between 1 April 1947 and 15 May 1950.
- Relief Landing Ground for No. 22 SFTS between 1 February 1948 and 15 November 1951.
- No. 93 Maintenance Unit between 8 January 1951 and 31 January 1959.
- Detachment – 504 Sqn between September 1952 and unknown.
- No. 13 Group Communications Flt between 1 June and 1 November 1955.
- No. 2 Home Command Gliding Centre between 1 July 1958 and 31 March 1959.
- No. 2 Gliding Centre between 31 March and 1 September 1959.
- No. 9 School of Technical Training between 1 December 1959 and 17 May 1974.
- Nottingham University Air Sqn between June and 1 November 1946 also between 9 June 1947 and 24 November 1967.

== Closure ==
By December 1994, the station was noted by the Ministry of Defence (MOD) as being considered for alternative defence requirements.

In June 1995, as part of changes to RAF ground training the MOD announced the relocation of Headquarters Air Cadets from RAF Newton to RAF Cranwell in Lincolnshire and the reduction of Newton to an enclave for the East Midlands Universities Air Squadron (EMUAS) and No. 7 Air Experience Flight. The airfield was also used by the Joint Elementary Flying Training School and by the British Army's 73 Engineer Regiment (Volunteers) for vehicle storage.

In March 2000 it was announced that RAF Newton would be disposed of. The MOD considered that Newton was under-utilised and relatively costly to operate, concluding that disposal would offer substantial cost savings.

== Post-military use ==
Today the site is a private industrial estate and the buildings are being converted into offices and storage space. The old control tower still stands and is being converted into offices; the grass airfield has reverted to agriculture. Nottinghamshire Police use parts of the site for public order, method of entry and big police dog training.

Outside the former RAF Station main gate, the old NAAFI building is home to 1936 (Newton) Squadron of the Air Training Corps, which is currently commanded by Flt Lt David Francis RAFAC, thus creating continued RAF presence to the village since its initial formation during the early years of the Second World War.

The abandoned houses on the base were used to film scenes from the film This is England. It has also been used for the television series Robot Wars during the 6th series on the BBC and after it transferred to the commercial UK channel Five.

The site is located within Nottingham's Green Belt.

Proposals for building a large number of homes on-site are well developed with at least 550 earmarked for the former base site.

== Radioactive contamination ==
The RAF Newton site is, according to the Ministry of Defence, contaminated with radium that was used to coat the dials of aircraft and other equipment so that they could be seen in the dark. It was in scrap burned and dumped in the 1940s and 1950s, and remains radioactive for thousands of years.

== See also ==
- List of former Royal Air Force stations
