= Northern Ireland Universities Air Squadron =

University flying squadron of the Royal Air Force

- Active: 1941-1996, 2015–present
- Country: United Kingdom
- Branch: Royal Air Force
- Role: Training, Recruiting
- Part of: No. 6 Flying Training School
- Garrison/HQ: Aldergrove Flying Station
- Mottos: Latin: Novos Finis Usque Petentes "Always Seeking New Horizons"
- Equipment: Grob Tutor T1

Northern Ireland Universities Air Squadron is a University Air Squadron connected to the Queen’s University Belfast and Ulster University, Northern Ireland, United Kingdom.

== History ==
Queens University Air Squadron (QUAS) the predecessor organization to Northern Ireland Universities Air Squadron was set up in January 1941 following a large loss of airman during the Battle of Britain. QUAS undertook the training of 587 Officer Cadets during The Second World War.

QUAS had flown out of RAF Sydenham since 1941. However, in the 1970s, Sydenham transitioned away from an active RAF airfield into a heavy aircraft servicing base, ceasing being an active duty base in 1973. QUAS maintain flight operations at RAF Sydenham throughout the 1980s, relocating to RAF Aldergrove in 1992 and operating there until disbandment in 1996.

Member of Parliament John Wilkinson (British politician) asked Minister of State for the Armed Forces (Hon) Nicholas Soames about the closure of the University Air Squads in Northern Ireland in parliament at a debate on 25th Oct 1995. The Secretary of State argued that "The Department has proposed the closure of Queen's University Air Squadron at the end of the 1995–96 academic year" and should Queens close No. 13 Air Experience Flight, which shares accommodation with the UAS, would also close.

Previous to this, the Ulster Unionist Party (UUP), alongside some Labour members, had tabled a motion supported by the new leader of the UUP David Trimble. The motion demanded that "this House calls upon Her Majesty's Government to retain the Queen's University Air Squadron to afford equality of opportunity to all regions within the United Kingdom" . Despite the Confidence and Supply agreement the UUP had with John Major the appeal was unsuccessful. The squadrons closed in July 1996. This meant a pause in UAS coverage of Northern Ireland for nearly 20 years, until the squadron was re-founded in 2015.

== Aircraft ==
Historic Aircraft used: - Moth, Tutor, Tiger Moth II, Harvard T Mk 2b, Oxford, Provost T Mk 1, Chipmunk T Mk 10, Anson T Mk 21, Prentice T Mk 1, Bulldog T Mk 1.

Current Aircraft used: Grob 115E (Tutor) The Squadron has a fleet of 3 Grob Tutor aircraft based at RAF Aldergrove Flying Station. Any Officer Cadet (Off Cdt) who completes the flying syllabus will be awarded a Preliminary Flying Badge or Wings, known as Budgie wings.

== Incidents ==
- On Sunday 5 March 1950, 1.25pm, Proctor 'NP389' crashed at Sydenham, with Flying Officer Sidney Thomas Bryans, aged 30, of 84 Northland Road, Derry, who attended Foyle College, with William Angus Lister Morrison, aged 21, of Killowen, and Ernest Harold Porter, aged 21, studied engineering, of 418 Lisburn Road, Belfast, who died in the Royal Victoria Hospital, Belfast after five minutes, who attended the Methodist College Belfast
- On Sunday 30 May 1954 at Loughgall at 4.25pm, Harvard 'KF751' crashed, with Brian McClay, aged 24, of White Lodge on Balmoral Avenue, who gained a Mechanical Engineering degree in 1953
- On Wednesday 3 March 1976 XX612 crashed at Balloo, County Down, after taken off from RAF Sydenham
- Squadron Leader Robert John Burge was killed on Friday 16 October 1992; he had been the commanding officer for only two weeks. Burge had taken off on a training flight from Belfast City Airport with a female student aboard. The aircraft crashed at Comber during a forced landing. The occupants were taken to Ulster Hospital. The student occupant sustained major injuries but survived. Burge was the son of John and Brenda Burge of Birkdale.

== Alumni ==
- Air Commodore Paddy Forsythe CBE DFC (1920-2009), Station Commander of RAF Acklington, he flew 30 sorties with Avro Lancasters with 625 Sqn during the war, he attended Methodist College Belfast and studied Law at QUB

== See also ==
- University Air Squadron units
- University Royal Naval Unit, the Royal Navy equivalent
- Officers Training Corps, the British Army equivalent
- List of Royal Air Force aircraft squadrons
