= List of mid-air collisions and incidents in the United Kingdom =

A number of mid-air collisions and incidents have taken place in the United Kingdom.

== 1910s ==
1914

- 12 May 1914 two Royal Flying Corps Sopwith Three-seaters collided at Aldershot, two killed.

1915

- 12 September 1915 A Royal Naval Air Service Short S.38 was destroyed in a mid-air collision with a Caudron G.III at Eastchurch, both pilots killed.

1916

- 10 May 1916 – two civil aircraft collide at Hendon, one killed.
- 10 August 1916 – an Armstrong Whitworth FK.3 crashes after a collision near Lilbourne, two killed.
- 8 September 1916 – Bristol Scout Type D of the RNAS collides with another Bristol Scout near Cranwell, one killed.
- 26 September 1916 – Bristol Scout Type C of the RNAS collides with another aircraft near Cranwell, one killed.
- 5 October 1916 – Two B.E.2cs collide at Upavon, two killed including Keith Lucas.

1917

- 12 February 1917 – A RFC B.E.2c collides with a Martinsyde at Upavon, two killed.
- 15 March 1917 – A RFC B.E.2c collides with a Bristol Scout in the Barnet area, two killed.
- 23 March 1917 – Two Sopwith 1½ Strutters of the Central Flying School collide at Upavon, two killed.
- 23 April 1917 – A RFC Maurice Farman Shorthorn collides with another aircraft in the Edinburgh area, two killed.
- 22 May 1917 – Two B.E.12s collide while breaking formation near Hove, two killed.
- 16 June 1917 – A B.E.2e collides with another aircraft at Scampton, Lincolnshire, one killed.
- 17 July 1917 – A RNAS Sopwith Baby crashed into sea after a collision with a Curtiss H.12 near Felixstowe, one killed.
- 10 August 1917 – An Avro 504A collided with a B.E.12 at Catterick, two killed.
- 17 August 1917 – An Avro 504J crashed into the River Thames after colliding with another Avro 504J near Purfleet, one killed.
- 20 August 1917 – Two B.E.2e collide near Godmanchester, two killed.
- 20 August 1917 – An R.E.8 collides with another R.E.8 while formation flying near Yatesbury Aerodrome, two killed.
- 30 August 1917 – A B.E.2e collides with a B.E.12 at Catterick, two killed.
- 23 October 1917 – An Avro 504J collides with a Nieuport 20 at Colehurst, two killed.
- 26 October 1917 – A Sopwith Triplane collides with another aircraft near Manston, Kent, one killed.
- 3 November 1917 – Two Avro 504Js collide near Scampton, two killed.
- 4 November 1917 – Two Avro 504Js collide in Ayrshire, Scotland, one killed.
- 4 November 1917 – An Avro 504J collides with another aircraft at Gosport, one killed.
- 12 November 1917 – Two Sopwith Camels collide at Wallington, Surrey, two killed.
- 14 November 1917 – A Sopwith Camel and B.E.2e collide at Edinburgh, Scotland, two killed.
- 12 December 1917 – A B.E.2e crashed after a collision with another aircraft near Appleshaw, Andover, one killed.
- 20 December 1917 – A RNAS Sea Scout Zero airship collided with another airship at Jevington, Sussex, one killed.
- 23 December 1917 – Two De Havilland DH.6s collide on take-off at Stamford, two killed.
- 24 December 1917 – Two B.E.2es collide at Lake Down, two killed.

1918

- 7 March 1918 - Captain AB Kynoch in a Be12 of 37 (HD) Sqn collides with Captain HC Stroud in a SE5a of 61 (HD) Sqn and both crash near Shotgate, Essex; two killed

== 1930s ==
1931

- On 6 May 1931 Bristol Bulldog K1081 of 17 Squadron RAF collided with another Bulldog, pilot killed.
- On 26 October 1931 two RAF Armstrong Whitworth Atlas of 13 Squadron RAF collide in Wiltshire, two killed in K1017 and one in J9526, a passenger survived.

1939

- On 1 August 1939 two RAF Airspeed Oxfords of No. 15 Flying Training School collide near RAF Lossiemouth, Scotland and both crash into the sea.

== 1940s ==
1940

- On 10 June 1940 an RAF North American Harvard and an Airspeed Oxford collide, Oxford crashes.
- On 9 July 1940 two RAF Airspeed Oxfords collide and crash near Fawler, Oxfordshire.
- On 17 July 1940 an RAF Airspeed Oxford collides with a Miles Master.
- On 23 September 1940 two RAF Airspeed Oxfords collide near RAF Shawbury, both crash.
- On 29 December 1940 two out of a section patrol of three Westland Whirlwinds of 263 Squadron collide over Dartmoor.

1941

- On 28 April 1941 two RAF Airspeed Oxfords collide on approach to RAF South Cerney.
- On 17 June 1941 an RAF Fairey Battle and an Airspeed Oxford collide on approach to RAF Shawbury.
- On 18 July 1941 two RAF Airspeed Oxfords collide on approach to RAF Shawbury.
- On 14 September 1941 two RAF Airspeed Oxfords collide during formation flying near RAF South Cerney, one crashed in flames.
- On 9 October 1941 two out of a formation of six Westland Whirlwinds of 263 Squadron collide over Saltford, Somerset.
- On 27 October 1941 an RAF Airspeed Oxford and a Percival Proctor collide, Oxford crashed near RAF Upper Heyford.

1942

- On 17 May 1942 two RAF Airspeed Oxfords collide on approach to Bridleway Gate.
- On 19 May 1942 two RAF Airspeed Oxfords collide while formation flying, one aircraft crashes near RAF Driffield.

1943

- On 23 October 1943 two RAF Supermarine Spitfire Vbs of 66 Squadron collide near Perranporth.
- On 27 October 1943 two RAF Supermarine Spitfire Vbs of 340 Squadron collide in East Lothian, Scotland.
- On 19 October 1943 two RAF Hawker Hurricane IVs of 186 Squadron collide near Alloa, Clackmannan.
- On 7 November 1943 an RAF Miles Master of 5 PAFU collides with an Avro Anson of the same unit near Longford, Shropshire.
- On 7 November 1943 two RAF Vickers Wellingtons (one from 26 OTU and the other from 27 OTU) collide near Abbots Ripton, Huntingdonshire.

1944

- On 19 May 1944 two RAF North American Mustang IIIs of 122 Squadron collide in cloud new Honeywood House in Surrey.
- On 18 August 1944 an RAF North American Mustang III of 306 Squadron and an RAF Supermarine Spitfire collide near Han Street, Kent.

1945

- On 23 March 1945 two RAF North American Mustang IIIs 126 Squadron collide and near West Raynham.
- On 11 April 1945 two RAF North American Mustang IIIs of 316 Squadron collide near Andrews Field.
- On 16 May 1945 two RAF North American Mustang IIIs of 309 Squadron collide 45 miles east of Bradwell Bay.
- On 23 May 1945 two RAF North American Mustang IIIs of 64 Squadron collide during a practice dogfight near Cantley in Norfolk.
- On 13 July 1945 two RAF North American Mustang IIIs of 315 Squadron collide near Wickham Bishops, Essex.
- On 2 October 1945 two Royal Air Force (RAF) Supermarine Spitfires of 695 Squadron collide over Norfolk while in formation.
- On 11 October 1945 a RN Fairey Swordfish of the Air Torpedo Development Unit collided with an RAF Bristol Beaufighter over the Solent and crashed into the sea.
- On 28 November 1945 two RAF de Havilland Tiger Moths of No. 24 Elementary Flying Training School collide at RAF Sealand causing one to fatally crash.
- On 13 December 1945 two RAF Supermarine Spitfires of No. 80 Operational Training Unit collided over County Durham while in formation.

1946

- On 15 January 1946 two Royal Air Force (RAF) Gloster Meteor IIIs of 124 Squadron collided at Bentwaters, Suffolk.
- On 18 January 1946 two RAF North American Harvard IIs collided at RAF Cranwell.
- On 23 January 1946 an RAF Miles Martinet of RAF Spilsby collides with another Martinet and crashes.
- On 16 April 1946 two RAF de Havilland Mosquitos of 85 Squadron collided at RAF Tangmere, Sussex.
- On 30 April 1946 two RAF Bristol Beaufighters of 254 Squadron collided over Suffolk.
- On 30 April 1946 two RAF Supermarine Spitfires collide while in formation near RAF Digby, Lincolnshire.
- On 25 April 1946 two RAF Airspeed Oxfords collided near Longcot, Berkshire.
- On 16 May 1946 two RAF Hawker Tempests collided at Chilbolton.
- On 10 July 1946 an RAF Gloster Meteor of 74 Squadron hit another Meteor while flying in formation and crashed into the ground.
- On 27 June 1946 an RAF Supermarine Spitfire collided with a Vickers Wellington over east Yorkshire during a practice attack.
- On 26 July 1946 an RAF Supermarine Spitfire collided with a Vickers Wellington over east Yorkshire during a practice attack, both aircraft were from the Central Gunnery School.
- On 14 September 1946 two RAF Hawker Tempests of 3 Squadron collided over Kent.
- On 17 October 1946 an RAF Airspeed Oxford collided with a de Havilland Tiger Moth near Sandridge, Hertfordshire.

1947

- On 11 November 1947 a de Havilland Hornet of No. 19 Squadron RAF collided with an Avro Lancaster of No. 115 Squadron RAF near Stanford during a practice attack.
- On 7 December 1947 two RAF Supermarine Spitfire LF.16s of 614 Squadron collided near Long Sutton in Somerset.

1948

- On 17 March 1948 two RAF Vickers Wellingtons of the No.1 Air Navigation School collided near Topcliffe, Yorkshire.
- On 25 May 1948 an RAF de Havilland Mosquito NF36 of 141 Squadron collided at night near Saxlingham Green, Norfolk with a Percival Proctor.
- On 31 May 1948 an RAF de Havilland Dominie C1 collided with an RAF Avro Anson near Bulford, Wiltshire.
- On 4 July 1948 an Avro York of the RAF and a Scandinavian Airlines System-operated Douglas DC-6 were involved in a collision over Northwood, London. Both aircraft crashed into a wooded area and the aircraft were destroyed. All 32 passengers and crew on the DC-6 and all seven crewmembers of the York were killed.
- On 9 July 1948 an RAF Airspeed Oxford landed safely after collided with a Tiger Moth on approach to Perth, Scotland but the aircraft was not repaired.
- On 13 September 1948 two RAF de Havilland Mosquitos collided near West Malling.
- On 24 September an RAF Gloster Meteor of 1 Squadron collided with a, RAF Tiger Moth at RAF Tangmere, both aircraft fatally crashed.
- On 29 October 1948 two RAF Supermarine Spitfire LF16s collided near Hartland Point, Devon.
- On 17 November 1948 two RAF de Havilland Tiger Moths collided near RAF Leuchars, Scotland.
- On 30 November 1948 two RAF Supermarine Spitfire LF16s collided near Braunton, Devon.

1949

- On 3 February 1949 two RAF North American Harvards collided while in formation and one crashed near RAF Marham, Norfolk.
- On 16 February 1949 two RAF Supermarine Spitfire F.16s of 631 Squadron collide near Merioneth, Wales, one aircraft crashed into sea and one landed safely but was not repaired.
- On 19 February 1949 a British European Airways Douglas Dakota on a flight from Glasgow to London collided with an RAF Avro Anson over the village Exhall killing all 14 passengers and crew on both aircraft.
- On 1 March 1949 two RAF Avro Ansons collide and crash near Uffington, Berkshire.
- On 15 June 1949 two RAF Supermarine Spitfire F.16s of 601 Squadron collide while in formation over Surrey, one force landed and the other crashed with the loss of the pilot.
- On 28 June 1949 two RAF Gloster Meteors of 257 Squadron collide near RAF Finningley, Yorkshire and both are abandoned.
- On 23 August 1949 two RAF Supermarine Spitfires of 541 Squadron collide while in formation over Berkshire and are abandoned.
- On 15 September 1949 two RAF De Havilland Mosquitos of 109 Squadron collide during a Battle of Britain flypast at RAF Snettisham in Lincolnshire, both crash land.
- On 26 September 1949 two RAF Avro Lincolns on a night exercise collide with a loss of seven crew on each aircraft.
- On 20 October 1949 an RAF de Havilland Tiger Moth was hit from behind by a civil Auster in the circuit at Wolverhampton aerodrome and crashed.
- On 3 November 1949 an Avro Lancaster of No. 148 Squadron RAF collides south of Selsey Bill, Sussex with a No. 29 Squadron RAF de Havilland Mosquito during a night interception exercise.
- On 23 November 1949 an RAF Gloster Meteor collides with a Percival Proctor over Norfolk, both aircraft fatally crash.

== 1950s ==
1951

- On 27 January 1951 two RAF De Havilland Tiger Moths of 17 RFS collided near South Ockendon, Essex.
- On 26 April 1951 two RAF North American Harvard T.2Bs of the Central Flying School collide near Moreton-in-Marsh.
- On 18 May 1951 two RAF North American Harvards of 6 Flying Training School collide near Ledbury, Herefordshire, two killed.
- On 18 June 1951 two RAF Gloster Meteors of 600 Squadron collide near RAF Biggin Hill.
- On 2 July 1951 two RAF North American Harvards of 1 FTS collide near Graveley.
- On 3 July 1951 two RAF Gloster Meteors collided near RAF Strubby.
- On 13 August 1951 an AF Miles Martinet TT.1 of No. 228 OCU collided with a Vickers Wellington over North Yorkshire and spun in, eight were killed, with one survivor. Flight Lieutenant John Quinton DFC was awarded a posthumous George Cross for his gallantry in the aftermath of the crash, in which he died.
- On 15 September 1951 two RAF Gloster Meteors collided during a formation roll near RAF Waterbeach.
- On 1 November 1951 two RAF Gloster Meteors collided on landing at RAF Waterbeach.

1952

- On 7 January 1952 two RAF Gloster Meteors collided in the circuit at RAF Linton-on-Ouse.
- On 20 January 1952 two RAF Gloster Meteors collided near RAF Linton-on-Ouse, Yorkshire.
- On 29 February 1952 two RAF Gloster Meteors collided near York, Yorkshire.
- On 6 March 1952 two RAF de Havilland Vampires collided during a formation take-off at RAF Valley.
- On 18 April 1952 two Sabre 2 jets collided near the bombing range at RAF Wainfleet in Lincolnshire
- On 5 May 1952 a Royal Air Force Gloster Meteor collided with a United States Air Force (USAF) North American F-86 Sabre near Guildford, Surrey.
- On 20 May 1952 two RAF Gloster Meteors collided 20 miles east of Great Yarmouth, Norfolk.
- On 20 June 1952 an RAF Gloster Meteor collided with a Vickers Wellington six miles north-west of RAF Newton.
- On 16 July 1952 two RAF Gloster Meteors collided near Ottringham, Yorkshire.
- On 31 July 1952 two RAF Gloster Meteors collided near Rayne, Essex.
- On 19 August 1952 two RAF Gloster Meteors collided near Debenham, Suffolk.
- On 19 August 1952 two RAF Gloster Meteors collided near Stanhope, County Durham.
- On 15 September 1952 to RAF Avro Ansons collided near Widdrington, Essex.
- On 17 October 1952 two RAF Gloster Meteors collided near Witham, Essex.
- On 4 November 1952 two RAF Gloster Meteors collided over Norwich, Norfolk.
- On 14 November 1952 two RAF Gloster Meteors collided over Norwich, Norfolk.
- On 11 December 1952 two RAF Gloster Meteors collided 23 miles north-north-east of Whitby, Yorkshire.
- On 18 December 1952 two RAF Gloster Meteors collided near Alpheton, Suffolk.

1953

- On 9 February 1953 two RAF Gloster Meteors collided at RAF Weston Zoyland.
- On 18 March 1953 two RAF Gloster Meteors collided in formation, three miles south-west of Duxford.
- On 28 April 1953 two RAF de Havilland Chipmunks collided near Kirby Muxloe, Leicestershire.
- On 24 July 1953 two RAF de Havilland Vampires collided on approach to Meryfield.
- On 1 September 1953 two RAF de Havilland Vampires collided 1 mile south west of Hartland Point, Devon.
- On 11 September 1953 two RAF Gloster Meteors collided Woolwich, London.
- On 7 November 1953 two RAF Gloster Meteors collided near Headcorn, Kent.
- On 30 November 1953 two RAF Gloster Meteors collided near Horham, Suffolk.

1954

- On 5 March 1954 two RAF Gloster Meteors collided four miles east of Deal, Kent.
- On 24 July 1954 two RAF Gloster Meteors collided near RAF Leuchars, Scotland.
- On 20 February 1954 two RAF Gloster Meteors collided five miles south of North Weald, Essex.
- On 3 April 1954 two RAF Gloster Meteors collided near Chipping Ongar, Essex.
- On 16 June 1954 two Royal Air Force Canadair Sabres collided near Hornsea, Yorkshire.
- On 24 July 1954 two RAF Gloster Meteors collided one mile north-west of RAF Leuchars, Scotland.
- On 26 July 1954 two Royal Air Force Percival Provosts collided at RAF Ternhill, Shropshire.
- On 9 September 1954 two RAF Gloster Meteors collided near Neatishead, Norfolk.
- On 4 October 1954 two RAF Gloster Meteors collided north of Chelmsford, Essex.
- On 4 October 1954 a Royal Air Force Gloster Meteor collided with a USAF North American F-86 Sabre near RAF Wattisham, Suffolk.
- On 28 November 1954 two Royal Air Force de Havilland Venoms collided near Hamble.

1955

- On 3 March 1955 a Royal Air Force Gloster Meteor collided with a Royal Navy de Havilland Sea Vampire near Paines Wood, Sussex.
- On 19 April 1955 two RAF Gloster Meteors collided in formation, five miles east of Peterborough, Lincolnshire.
- On 15 August 1955 two RAF Gloster Meteors collided near Barmston, Yorkshire.
- On 17 August 1955 a Royal Air Force Canadair Sabre collided with a Royal Navy Hawker Sea Hawk three miles east of Yeovilton, Somerset.
- On 26 August 1955 two RAF Gloster Meteors collided seven miles north of Ipswich, Suffolk.
- On 2 September 1955 two RAF Hawker Hunters collided at RAF Chivenor, Devon.
- On 13 September 1955 two RAF Percival Provosts collided at RAF Hullavington.
- On 21 September 1955 two RAF Gloster Meteors collided near Church Broughton, Derbyshire.
- On 24 October 1955 two RAF Percival Provosts collided near Yatton Keynell, Wiltshire.

1956

- On 11 January 1956 two RAF Percival Provosts collided in circuit at RAF Ternhill, Shropshire.
- On 26 February 1956 two RAF Percival Provosts in formation collided near Tuxford, Nottinghamshire.
- On 24 August 1956 an RAF Hawker Hunter collided with a Gloster Javelin over Wotton-under-edge, Gloucestershire.
- On 22 October 1956 a Royal Air Force Boulton Paul Balliol collided with a de Havilland Chipmunk in the circuit at Middle Wallop.

1957

- On 3 January 1957 two RAF Gloster Meteors collided near Hales, Norfolk.
- On 14 January 1957 two RAF Gloster Meteors collided in formation near Worms Head, Glamorgan.
- On 7 June 1957 two RAF Hawker Hunters collided during formation aerobatics near North Weald, Essex.
- On 10 September 1957 an RAF Hawker Hunter collided with a Royal Navy Westland Whirlwind near East Stratton, Hampshire.
- On 25 November 1957 a Royal Air Force Gloster Meteor collided with a USAF Republic F-84 Thunderjet near Newmarket, Suffolk.

1958

- On 16 January 1958 two RAF de Havilland Vampires collided near Nottingham.
- On 4 March 1958 two RAF Gloster Meteors collided in the circuit at RAF Church Fenton, Yorkshire.
- On 5 May 1958 two RAF Hawker Hunters collided during a practice dogfight off Selsey Bill, Sussex.
- On 13 June 1958 a Royal Air Force English Electric Canberra collided with a United States Air Force Lockheed T-33 near Spaldwick, Huntingdonshire.

1959

- On 31 January 1959 two RAF de Havilland Vampires collided at RAF Cranwell.
- On 25 August 1959 two RAF Hawker Hunters collided near Langley Street, Norfolk.
- On 1 September 1959 two RAF Gloster Javelins collided near Brundall, Norfolk.
- On 6 October 1959 two RAF Percival Provosts collided.
- On 15 October 1959 two RAF de Havilland Vampires collided during formation aerobatics near Oakington.

== 1960s ==
1960

- On 21 May 1960 two RAF Gloster Javelins collided four miles north-west of West Hartlepool, County Durham.
- On 10 June 1960 two RAF Hawker Hunters collided during formation aerobatics near RAF Wattisham.
- On 24 November 1960 two RNAS Hawker Sea Hawks collided over the sea off the coast of Scotland.

1961

- On 24 March 1961 two RAF de Havilland Vampires collided during a formation loop near RAF Binbrook.

1962

- On 14 August 1962 two RAF Percival Provosts collided near Ouston, four killed.
- On 4 November 1962 a Royal Air Force de Havilland Chipmunk collided with a civil Beagle Terrier two miles south of Reading, Berkshire.

1963

- On 29 January 1963 two RAF BAC Jet Provosts collided while landing at RAF Church Fenton.
- On 7 March 1963 two RAF Hawker Hunters collided during formation aerobatics near Hartland Point, Devon.
- On 6 June 1963 two RAF English Electric Lightnings collided near Great Bricett, Suffolk.
- On Monday July 15, 1963 at 12.45pm, two North American F-100 Super Sabre aircraft from the 492nd Fighter Squadron at RAF Lakenheath had a mid-air collision at RAF Holbeach. One pilot was killed, First Lt Donald Ware, 27, from Idaho. The other pilot, First Lt Marshall, 26, was picked up by an RAF helicopter from RAF Coltishall; he lived at Isleham in Cambridgeshire, from Coquille, Oregon. The Skegness lifeboat searched for four hours.

1964

- On 12 March 1964 two RAF BAC Jet Provosts collided near Moreton-in-Marsh.

1965

- On 20 April 1965 two RAF BAC Jet Provosts collided near Northallerton, North Yorkshire.

1966

- On 26 May 1966 two RAF BAC Jet Provosts collided and one then collided with another Jet Provost over Woodborough, Nottinghamshire, one with Flying Officer Tim Thorn.
- 14 June 1966 an RAF Vickers Varsity collides with a civilian Cessna 337 near Ulceby, Lincolnshire.
- On 23 June 1966 two RAF de Havilland Chipmunks collided near Tibberton Grange, Shropshire.
- On 17 December 1966 a Royal Air Force and a civil de Havilland Chipmunk collided on approach to Hamble airfield, Hampshire.

1967

- On 15 May 1967 two RAF Hawker Hunters collided near Tintagel, Cornwall.
- On 12 September 1967 two RAF de Havilland Chipmunks in formation collided two miles south-west of Portishead, Somerset.

1968

- On 26 February two RAF BAC Jet Provosts collided over Gloucestershire.
- On 19 August two RAF planes collided over Holt. Seven airmen were killed. A Victor aircraft and a Canberra collided.

== 1970s ==
1971

- On 20 January 1971 two RAF Hawker Siddeley Gnats collided over RAF Kemble,
- On 29 January 1971 two RAF English Electric Canberras collided near Mansfield, Nottinghamshire.
- On 2 March 1971 a Royal Air Force BAC Jet Provost collided with a Royal Navy Percival Sea Prince near Selby, Yorkshire.

1972

- On 16 February 1972 two RAF English Electric Lightnings collided 60 miles east of Harwich, Essex.
- On 10 August 1972 two RAF Hawker Hunters collided on approach to RAF Valley.

1973

- On 7 May 1973 two RAF BAC Jet Provosts collided near RAF Dishforth, Yorkshire.

1974

- On 9 August 1974 an RAF McDonnell-Douglas Phantom FGR2 of 41 Sqn collided at low-level with a Piper Pawnee crop-spraying aircraft at Fordham, Norfolk, near Downham Market.

1976

- On 19 January 1976 two RAF Hawker Siddeley Harriers collided near Nantwich, Cheshire.
- 30 April 1976 two RAF Hawker Siddeley Gnats collided near Dolgellau, Wales.

1979

- On Friday 20 April 1979 at 10.40am, General Dynamics F-111 Aardvark '73-0714' had a mid-air collision, and both ejected, Capt Joe Peluso, the pilot, and Capt Timothy Schlitt, the WSO, from Affton, Missouri. The aircraft was from the 492nd Tactical Fighter Squadron at RAF Lakenheath, all were aged 28. All landed in the Dornoch Firth, and an RAF Nimrod watched the scene. F-111 '70-2367' had flown into the other F-111, with Capt Stephen Ruttman, pilot, from Oklahoma, and Capt Roger Webb, the WSO, from Staunton, Virginia.
- On 21 September two RAF Hawker Siddeley Harriers collided above Wisbech One of them crashed, killing three people on the ground.

== 1980s ==
1982

- On 14 April 1982 two RAF McDonnell-Douglas Phantoms collided on take-off from RAF Coningsby, Lincolnshire.

1983

- On 23 February 1983 two RAF Hawker Siddeley Harriers collided near Peterborough, Norfolk.
- On 29 July 1983 two RAF Hawker Siddeley Hawks collided over Devon.
- On 12 July 1984 a Royal Air Force SEPECAT Jaguar and a Panavia Tornado collided two miles west of Sheringham, Norfolk.

1985

- On 7 October 1985 two RAF SEPECAT Jaguars collided while in formation over Cumbria.

1986

- On 25 May 1986 the Vintage Pair, a Gloster Meteor and de Havilland Vampire of the Royal Air Force's Central Flying School, collided during a display at RAF Mildenhall.
- On 6 June 1986 two RAF BAC Jet Provosts collided near Helmsley, North Yorkshire.

1987

- On 17 June 1987 a Royal Air Force SEPECAT Jaguar and Panavia Tornado collided off Cumbria.
- On 7 September 1987 two RAF McDonnell-Douglas Phantoms collided 55 miles east of RAF Leuchars, Scotland.
- On 2 November 1987 two RAF Hawker Siddeley Harriers collided during a practice attack at Otterburn ranges, Northumberland.
- On 16 November 1987 two RAF Hawker Siddeley Hawks of the Red Arrows aerobatic team collided during a practice display near RAF Scampton.

1989

- On 14 June 1989 two RAF Hawker Siddeley Hawks collided near Dyfed, Wales.

== 1990s ==
1990

- On 9 January 1990 a Royal Air Force SEPECAT Jaguar collided with a Royal Air Force PANAVIA Tornado near Hexham.

1991

- On 29 August 1991 a Royal Air Force SEPECAT Jaguar collided with a civil Cessna 152 near Carno, Powys.

1993

- On 24 July 1993 two Mikoyan MiG-29s of the Russian Air Force collided in midair during a display at the Royal International Air Tattoo at Fairford, Gloucestershire.

== 2000s ==
2007

- On 16 December 2007 a Luscombe 8E Silvaire Deluxe collided with a Pacific Aerospace PAC 750XL near Rugeley, Staffordshire.

2009

- On 11 February 2009 two Grob Tutor aircraft collided above Porthcawl, South Wales, killing the four people on board the two aircraft.
- On 14 June 2009 a Grob Tutor and a Cirrus Glider collided near Drayton, Oxfordshire.

== 2010s ==
2012

- On 3 July 2012 two Royal Air Force PANAVIA Tornados collided over the Moray Firth.

2017

- 17 November 2017, mid air collision between a light aircraft and helicopter, over Waddesdon, near Aylesbury in Buckinghamshire

== Bibliography ==
- Ray Sturtivant and Gordon Page Royal Navy Aircraft Serials and Units 1911–1919 Air-Britain, 1992. ISBN 0-85130-191-6
