= RAF Benson =

Royal Air Force main operating base in Oxfordshire, England

RAF Benson
- Near Wallingford, Oxfordshire in England
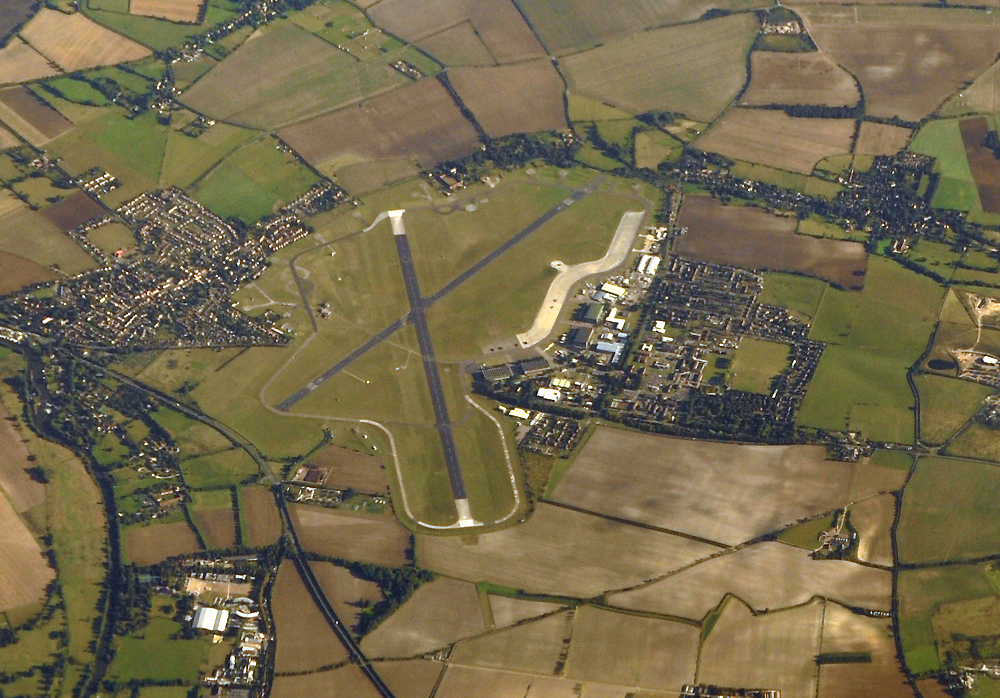
- Benson village (left) and RAF Benson (centre and right) from the air

- Spectemur agendo (Latin for 'Let us be judged by our acts')

Site information
- Type: Main Operating Base
- Code: EB
- Owner: Ministry of Defence
- Operator: Royal Air Force
- Controlled by: Joint Aviation Command; No. 2 Group RAF
- Condition: Operational
- Website: Official website

Location
- Shown within Oxfordshire RAF Benson (the United Kingdom)
- Coordinates: 51°36′59″N 001°05′45″W
- Area: 261 hectares (640 acres)

Site history
- Built: 1938–1939
- Built by: John Laing & Son Ltd
- In use: April 1939 – present
- Battles/wars: European theatre of World War II; Cold War

Garrison information
- Current commander: Wing Commander Alice Tierney
- Occupants: No. 22 Squadron; No. 28 Squadron; Oxford University Air Squadron; No. 6 Air Experience Flight; See Based units section for full list.

Airfield information
- Identifiers: IATA: BEX, ICAO: EGUB, WMO: 3658
- Elevation: 61.8 metres (203 ft) AMSL
Runways
Direction	Length and surface
01/19	1,825 metres (5,988 ft) Asphalt and concrete
- Source: RAF Benson Defence Aerodrome Manual

Royal Air Force Benson or RAF Benson (IATA: BEX, ICAO: EGUB) is a Royal Air Force station located at Benson, near Wallingford, in South Oxfordshire, England. It is a front-line station and from 2009 to 2025 was home to the RAF's fleet of Westland Puma HC2 support helicopters, which were used primarily for the transportation of troops & equipment. Flying squadrons comprise No. 22 Squadron which provides operational test, evaluation, tactics and training for all aviation in Joint Aviation Command and No. 28 Squadron, which is the Boeing Chinook HC6A training unit. Other units include the Oxford University Air Squadron and No. 6 Air Experience Flight, both flying the Grob Tutor T1 light training aircraft used for student and cadet flying training. The National Police Air Service and the Thames Valley Air Ambulance are also based at the station, both operating Airbus H135 helicopters.

RAF Benson opened in 1939 and during the Second World War it was tasked with training aircrews on the Fairey Battle light bomber and Avro Anson training aircraft. It was later home to squadrons flying the Supermarine Spitfire and de Havilland Mosquito which operated in the photographic reconnaissance role. Benson operated under RAF Transport Command throughout the 1950s and 1960s. During the 1970s, various communications and administrative units were present and in the early 1990s the station began its association with the support helicopter force.

== History ==
=== Early years and the Second World War ===
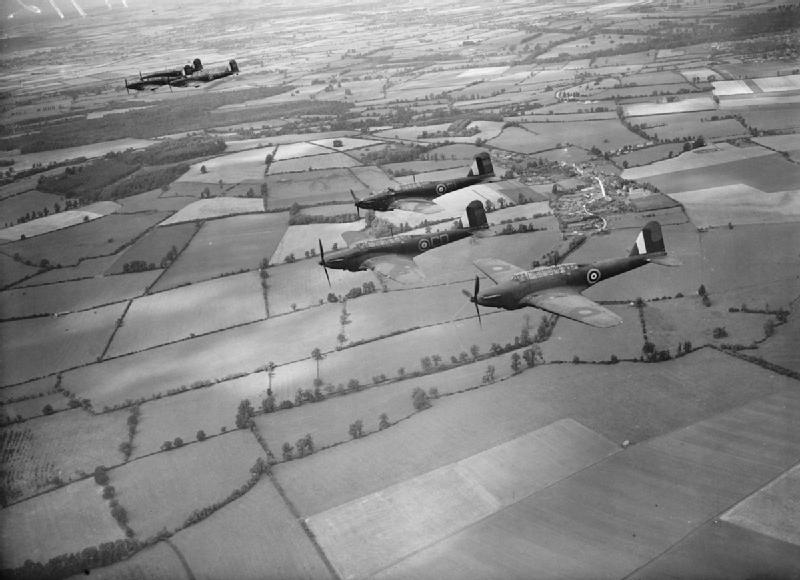
Fairey Battles of No. 12 Operational Training Unit based at RAF Benson during July 1940

Construction of RAF Benson began in 1937 as part of the 1930s RAF expansion programme which was largely a response to the threat of war with Nazi Germany. Construction was undertaken by contractors John Laing & Son. Benson was officially opened as an RAF station under No. 6 Group in early 1939. (Note: There are discrepancies amongst sources regarding the opening date of the station, with both 1 February and 1 April 1939 quoted in RAF and other publications.)

The station's first tenants were two squadrons of Fairey Battle light bombers. No. 103 Squadron started flying in on 3 April 1939, to be joined over the next few months by No. 150 Squadron. Once the Second World War started, both squadrons moved to France as part of the Advanced Air Striking Force. 1939 also saw the establishment of No. 12 Operational Training Unit (No. 12 OTU), tasked with training pilots, observers and air gunners on the Fairey Battle and Avro Anson. In the early hours of 2 August 1940, a Battle took off from Benson for a cross-country training exercise but crashed into a nearby hill. The crew included Richard Ormonde Shuttleworth, founder of the Shuttleworth Collection, who was killed.

Benson's long association with royalty began in September 1940, when the King's Flight relocated to the station. This initial association was short-lived, as the flight was disbanded in 1942 to form the core of No. 161 Squadron at RAF Newmarket, to which responsibility for the transportation of royalty was transferred. The Battles and Ansons of No. 12 OTU were replaced in December 1940 with Vickers Wellington medium bombers.

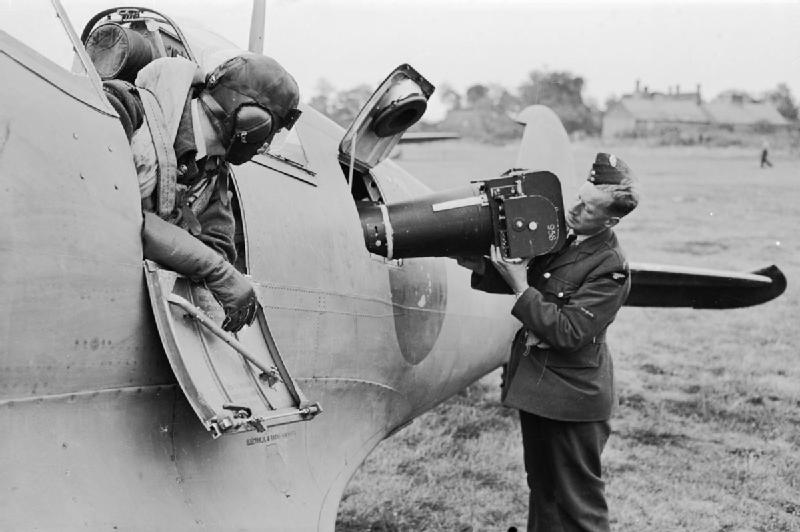
A Type F.8 Mark II (20-inch lens) aerial camera being loaded into a Supermarine Spitfire PR.IV at RAF Benson during the Second World War

Benson was selected in 1941 as the home station of No. 1 Photographic Reconnaissance Unit (No. 1 PRU), an experimental unit tasked with evaluating and developing new methods of obtaining photographic intelligence over enemy territory, led by pioneer in the field Squadron Leader Sidney Cotton. Utilising Supermarine Spitfires, the unit found that their camouflage and operating altitude allowed them to remain virtually invisible to enemy defences and avoid interception. Additional fuel tanks on the Spitfires allowed missions to take place deep into enemy territory. Analysis of imagery was undertaken by the intelligence unit at nearby Ewelme Manor, a short distance from the station. The unit was the first to discover the Germany Navy battleship Bismarck, near Bergen in May 1941. Later that month the vessel was destroyed by the Allies in the North Atlantic. As a result of such work, the station gained considerable fame as the home of photographic reconnaissance for the remainder of the war.

New paved runways were built in 1942, one of which required the permanent closure of the Old London Road in Benson. As a result, the Royal Engineers built the present road (part of the A4074) between Benson and Crowmarsh.

In June 1943, No. 1 PRU was formed into No. 106 Wing, with five units (No. 540, No. 541, No. 542, No. 543 and No. 544 Squadrons). The wing was elevated to the status of No. 106 (Photo Reconnaissance) Group in April 1944, with two de Havilland Mosquito and two Spitfire squadrons (No. 543 Squadron having been disbanded when the aircraft strength per squadron was increased). The group was assigned to Coastal Command's photo reconnaissance assets, with the whole of Northern Europe as its operational area. Spitfire and Mosquito aircraft flew missions over occupied Europe, including the provision of battle damage assessment images after Operation Chastise, the attack on German dams by No. 617 Squadron in May 1943.

By December 1944, Benson had two runways extending to 609 metres (666 yd; 1,998 ft) which had been constructed using concrete and wood-chips. There was a selection of hangar types, including four C-type hangars, four over-size (O) blister hangars and fourteen extra-over-size (EO) blister hangars. Ten concrete hard-standings were available, and a total of 3,198 personnel were based at the station.

During the war Vera Lynn, known as 'the forces Sweetheart', visited Benson to entertain the troops, reportedly singing "The White Cliffs of Dover" at the station.

=== Post-war ===
Post-war demobilisation saw the disbandment of No. 542 Squadron and No. 544 Squadron in August and October 1945 respectively, with No. 540 and No. 541 Squadrons following in September 1946. The King's Flight reformed at Benson in 1946 and received four Vickers Vikings during the following year. The unit was renamed the Queen's Flight on the coronation of Elizabeth II in June 1953.

Benson retained a photographic reconnaissance role into the early 1950s. No. 58 Squadron reformed in October 1946 to fly the Mosquito and Anson, No.541 Squadron reformed in November 1947 with the Spitfire PR.19 and No. 540 Squadron reformed in December 1947 to fly the Mosquito. No. 541 Squadron received the Gloster Meteor in December 1950, before relocating to Germany in June 1951. No. 540 Squadron re-equipped with the English Electric Canberra PR.3 in late 1952 and relocated to RAF Wyton in 1953 along with No. 58 Squadron.

==== Transport Command ====
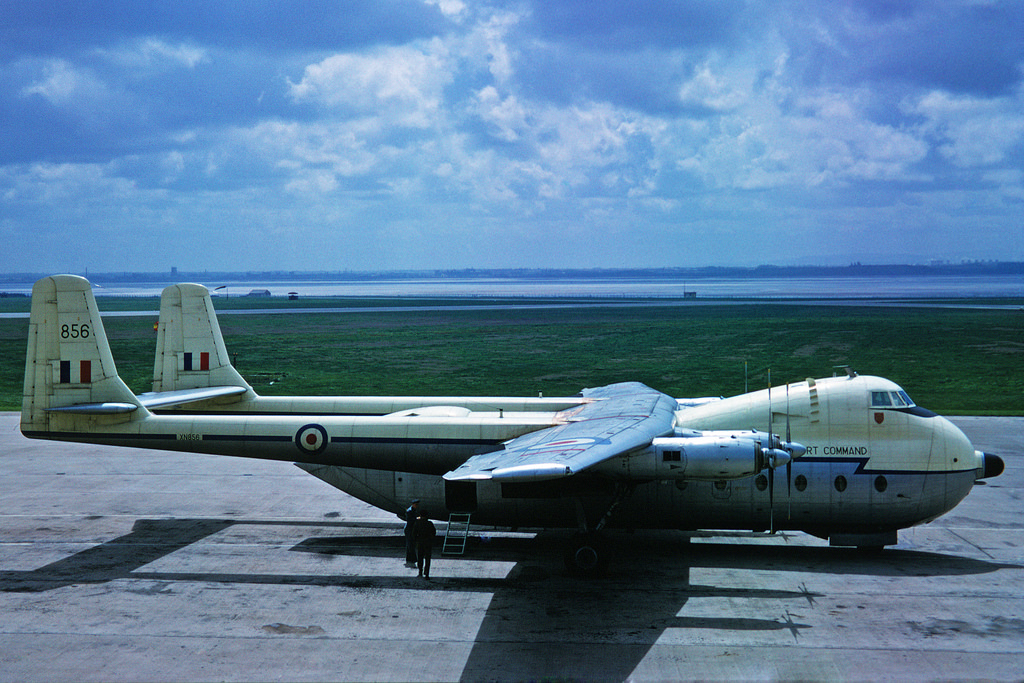
An RAF Armstrong Whitworth Argosy C.1 of the type based at RAF Benson during the 1960s

In 1953, Benson came under the control of Transport Command. No. 147 Squadron and No. 167 Squadron formed what was known as The Ferry Wing, which was responsible for the ferrying of aircraft across the globe. It was disbanded in 1960 when RAF squadrons became responsible for the collection and ferrying of their own aircraft.

Thereafter, Benson became the focus of the RAF's medium-range tactical transport fleet, operating the Armstrong Whitworth Argosy C.1. The first of six aircraft arrived on 20 November 1961 to form the Operational Conversion Unit (OCU) which trained Argosy crews. The OCU later moved to RAF Thorney Island. In February 1962, No. 105 Squadron formed to establish the first front-line unit for the type. It was soon followed by No. 215 Squadron. By the end of 1963 both units had departed for the Middle East and Far East respectively. Two further Argosy units were established, No. 114 Squadron and No. 267 Squadron, both operating from Benson until the early 1970s.

==== Support role ====
With the departure of the Argosys, the only flying unit which remained at Benson was the Queen's Flight. This remained the case throughout the 1970s and early 1980s. Notwithstanding, the station remained busy with several administrative and support units taking up residence. These included the headquarters of No. 38 Group (part of RAF Support Command which relocated from RAF Odiham) and the Tactical Communications Wing (TCW), both of which arrived in 1972. They remained until 1976 when No. 38 Group was subsumed into RAF Strike Command and relocated to RAF Upavon, whereas the TCW moved to nearby RAF Brize Norton. They were replaced by the RAF Support Command Signals Headquarters (SCSHQ) and the Radio Introduction Unit, which arrived from RAF Medmenham during 1977. SCSHQ remained at Benson until 1981.

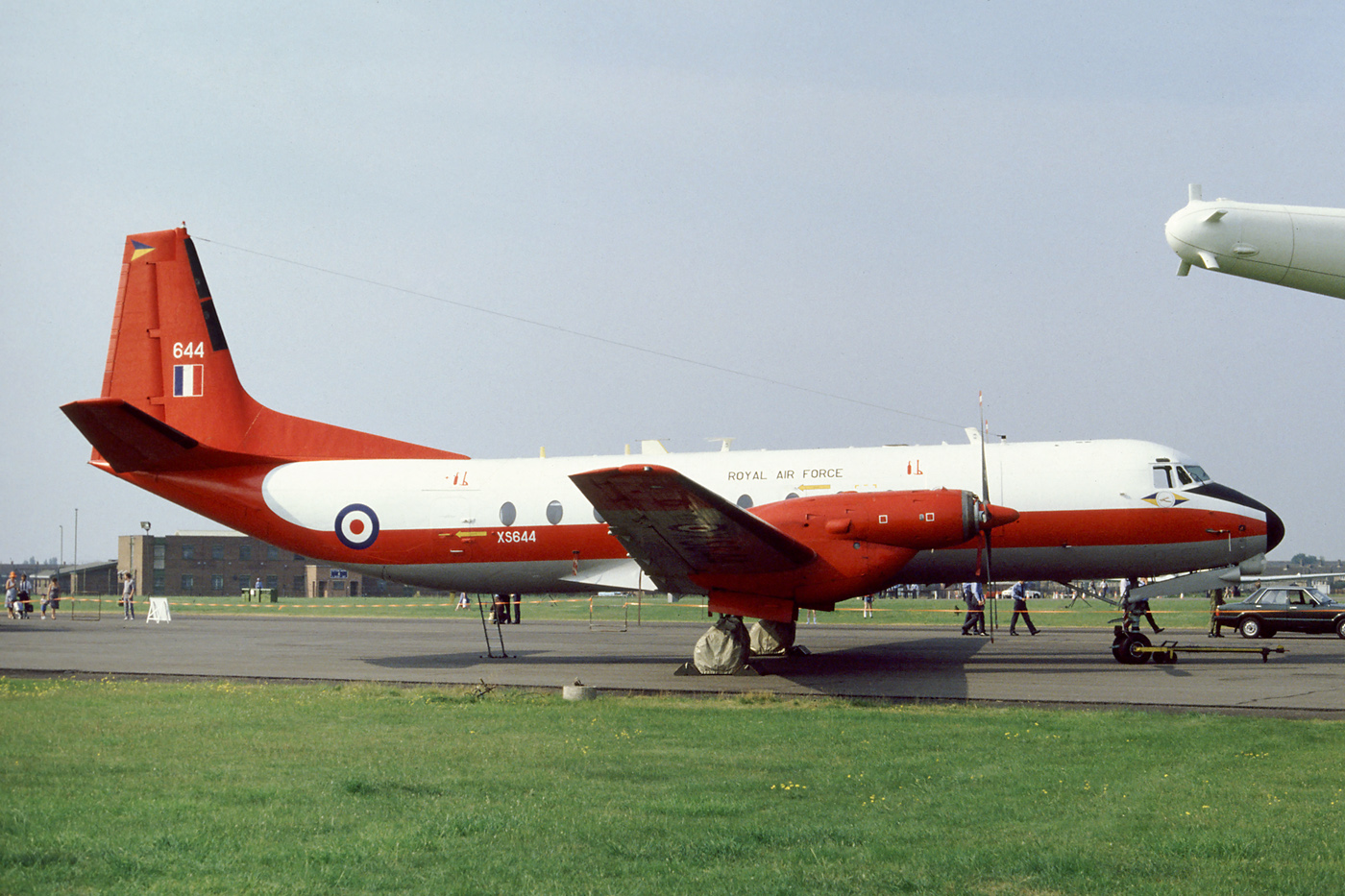
A Hawker Siddeley Andover E.3A of No. 115 Squadron which was based at RAF Benson during the 1980 and 90s

Flying activity increased in January 1983 when the Hawker Siddeley Andover arrived from RAF Brize Norton. Operated by No. 115 Squadron and supported by the Andover Training Flight, the Andover Serving Flight and the Support Command Flight Checking Unit, the Andovers were used in the radio and navigation-aid calibration role. The Support Command Flight Checking Unit disbanded in early 1987, with its role transferred to No. 115 Squadron.

The Queen's Flight received its first BAe 146 in May 1986, with a second in July 1986 and a final aircraft in late 1990.

==== Support helicopters ====
Benson's current support helicopter role began in 1992, when No. 60 Squadron reformed at the station, flying the Westland Wessex HC2.

In July of that year, the closure of nearby RAF Abingdon, resulted in several new units moving to Benson, namely the University of London Air Squadron and Oxford University Air Squadron both flying the Scottish Aviation Bulldog T.1 and No. 6 Air Experience Flight with the De Havilland Chipmunk T.1. The Mobile Catering Support Unit (MCSU), featuring a training facility and three Air Combat Support Units, returned in November 1992, having previously been stationed at Benson during the 1970s.

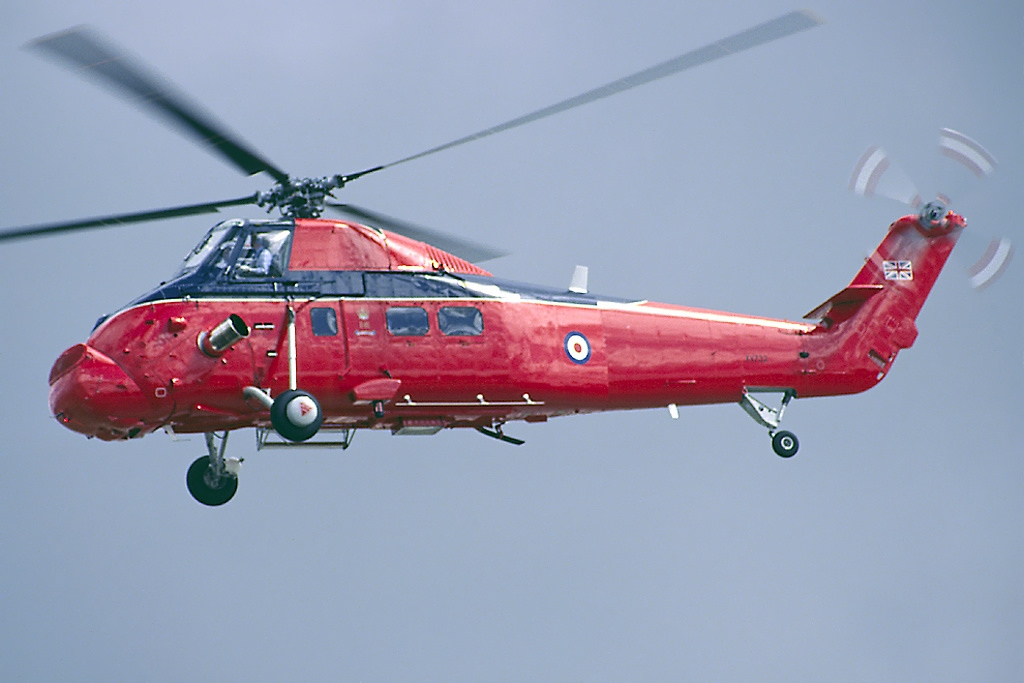
A Westland Wessex HCC.4 of the Queen's Flight seen in July 1993

The headquarters of the Support Helicopter Force (SHFHQ) relocated to Benson from RAF Gütersloh in 1993, after the German station's closure that year. The headquarters of No. 1 Group was located at Benson between 1993 and 1996.

On 1 April 1995, the Queen's Flight, then equipped with the BAe 146 CC2 and Wessex HCC.4, merged with No. 32 Squadron and moved to RAF Northolt in London to become No. 32 (The Royal) Squadron, bringing Benson's long association with VIP transport to an end.

June 1997 saw the Westland Puma HC1 introduced at Benson, when No. 33 Squadron arrived from RAF Odiham. The Puma Operational Conversion Flight, previously part of No. 27 Squadron at Odiham moved in during February 1998. Due to the increased level of helicopter activity at Benson, it was necessary to relocate the University of London Air Squadron to RAF Wyton during 1999.

In October 1999, as a result of the Strategic Defence Review, the RAF's Support Helicopter Force was amalgamated into the newly formed tri-service Joint Helicopter Command, now called the Joint Aviation Command. The new command, reporting to the British Army's Land Command, combined the battlefield support helicopters operated by the RAF, Fleet Air Arm and Army Air Corps.

=== 21st century ===
No. 28 Squadron reformed at Benson in July 2001 to equip with the new AgustaWestland Merlin HC3 support helicopter. To accommodate the new aircraft and personnel, a £25 million investment at Benson saw the refurbishment of the four C-type hangars, upgrading of station services & infrastructure and construction of engineering facilities and 100 homes. By July 2003, approximately 1,400 military personnel, 166 Ministry of Defence civilians and 150 contractors were employed at Benson. A further Merlin unit, No. 78 Squadron, reformed in late 2007 to operate six Merlin HC3As which had been purchased from the Royal Danish Air Force.

Doubt was cast over the future of RAF Benson during a review of Joint Helicopter Command's (JHC) airfields, known as Programme Belvedere. Consideration was given to closing at least one JHC airfield, with Benson's support helicopters potentially relocating to RAF Lyneham. The programme was abandoned in May 2009, when it was decided to largely retain the existing JHC basing arrangements. However, in November of that year, the Puma force was brought together when No. 230 Squadron relocated from JHC Flying Station Aldergrove to Benson.

The 2010 Strategic Defence and Security Review recommended that to replace the Navy's ageing Westland Sea King HC4, the RAF's Merlin HC3/3A fleet should be transferred to the Royal Navy's Commando Helicopter Force. To gain experience of operating and maintaining the Merlin, Royal Navy aircrew and engineers were integrated into the Merlin force at Benson during 2012.

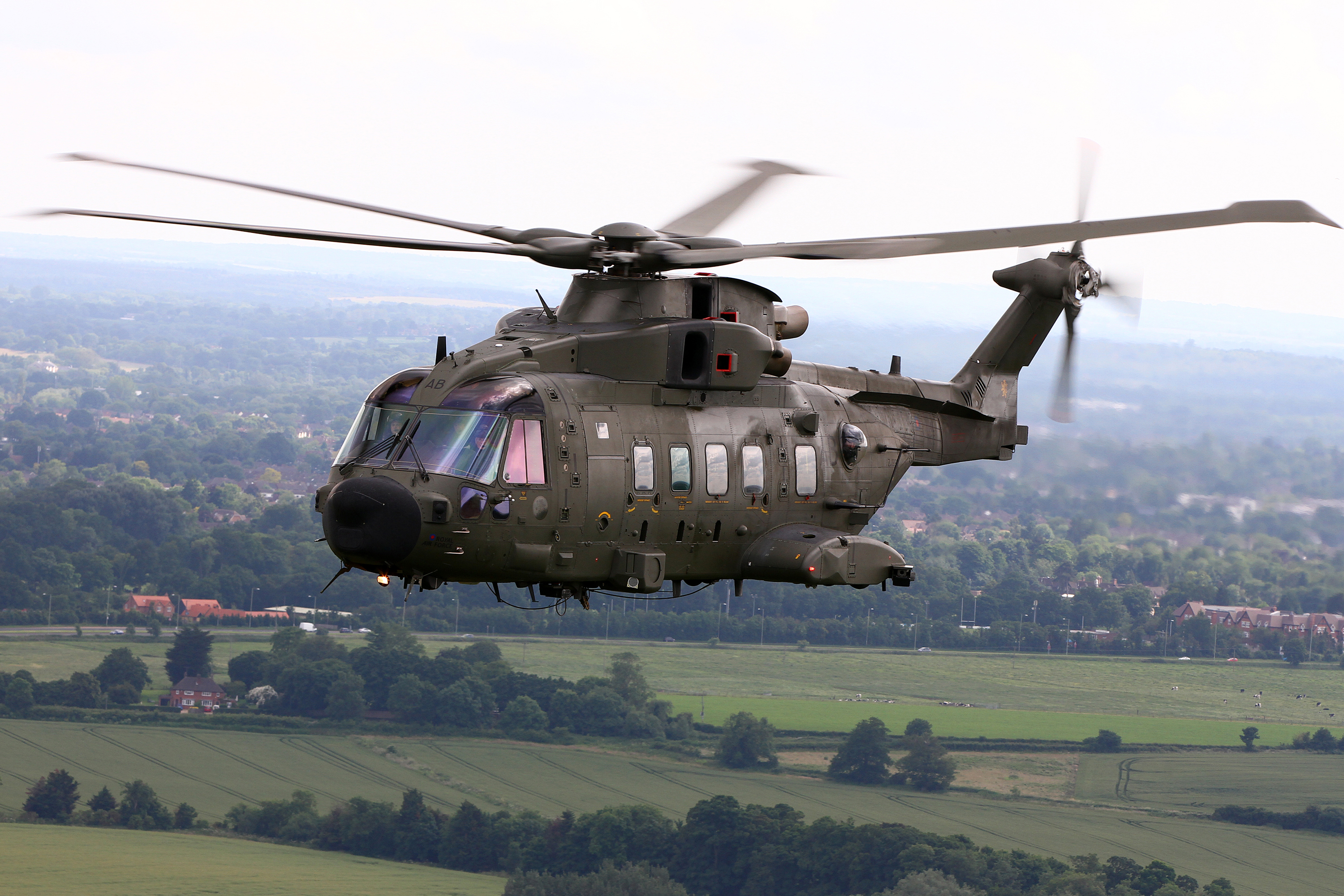
An RAF AgustaWestland Merlin HC3A

The Merlin fleet was officially handed over to the navy during a ceremony at Benson on 30 September 2014. It was attended by the then Prince Andrew, Duke of York (later Andrew Mountbatten-Windsor, who was then Commodore-in-Chief of the Fleet Air Arm), and Prince Michael of Kent (Honorary Air Marshal of RAF Benson). Air Chief Marshal Sir Andrew Pulford and Admiral Sir George Zambellas were also present. The ceremony marked the disbandment of No. 78 Squadron and its replacement by 846 Naval Air Squadron (NAS).

During July 2015, 845 Naval Air Squadron reformed and replaced No. 28 Squadron which disbanded. The last phases of the transition began when 846 NAS moved to RNAS Yeovilton on 26 March 2015. The final Merlin along with 845 NAS departed on 16 June 2016, bringing nearly 15 years of Merlin operations at Benson to a close.

In May 2015, it was announced that the Chinook Operational Conversion Flight, comprising six Boeing Chinooks and 150 personnel would transfer from RAF Odiham to Benson, to form a joint Puma and Chinook OCU, training crews on both aircraft types. The move began in December 2015 as the unit joined their Puma counterparts under a reformed No. 28 Squadron.

During 2016, the Joint Helicopter Support Squadron moved from RAF Odiham to Benson.

BAe 146 aircraft of No. 32 (The Royal) Squadron temporarily relocated to Benson between 15 April 2019 and late October 2019 due to the resurfacing of the runway at RAF Northolt. In May 2020, the Rotary Wing Operational Evaluation and Training Unit, which had been at Benson since 1997, adopted the No. 22 Squadron nameplate and took on the operational testing and evaluation role for the whole of Joint Helicopter Command.

== Infrastructure and facilities ==
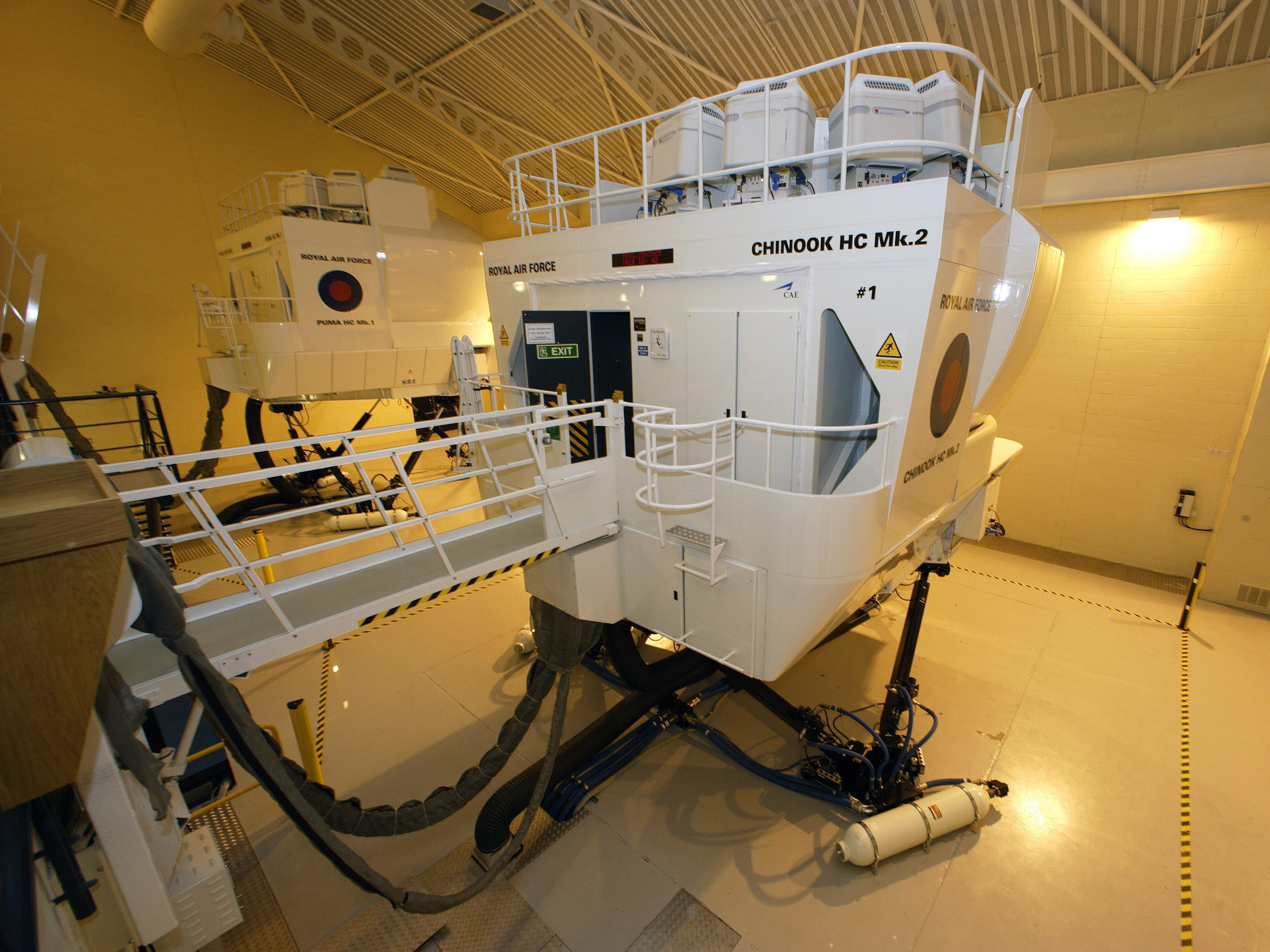
A Boeing Chinook flight simulator at RAF Benson

The RAF Benson site extends to 261 hectares (640 acres). It has one runway (01/19) which is 1,825 metres (5,988 ft) long and is constructed from asphalt and concrete. A second runway (06/24) along with the western taxiways are no longer in use, The airfield features two areas known as load parks (north and south), which are used by helicopters for practising under-slung load operations.

Aircraft hangars at Benson date from the Second World War and comprise four C-type (known as hangars A to D) and a T2 hangar.

=== Medium Support Helicopter Aircrew Training Facility ===
The Medium Support Helicopter Aircrew Training Facility (MSHATF) is home to six helicopter flight simulators (three Chinook, two Merlin and a Puma version). The facility was established in October 1997 and is operated by CAE Aircrew Training Services through a Private Finance Initiative contract. It employs around 70 personnel and trains RAF, Royal Navy, British Army, NATO and foreign crews. As well as the simulators, there are also four computer-based ground school training classrooms and a tactical control centre, allowing for operational mission training. In October 2017, the MOD announced it would invest £90 million in the facility over eight years.

== Role and operations ==
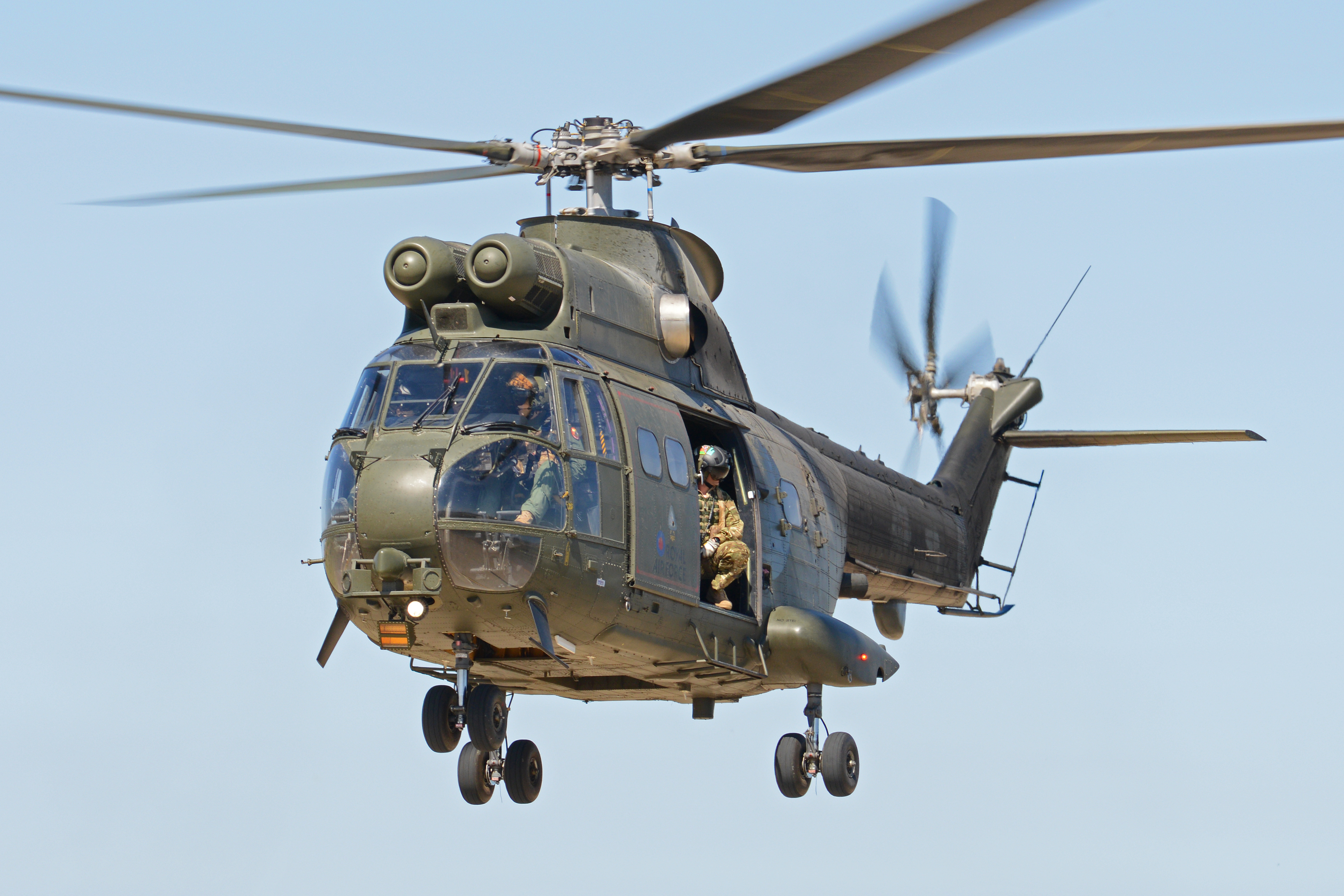
A Westland Puma HC2 of No. 230 Squadron formerly based at RAF Benson

=== Command ===
Group Captain Chris Royston-Airey was appointed as Benson station commander in November 2022. Prince Michael of Kent was appointed Honorary Air Commodore of RAF Benson in 2002 and was promoted to Honorary Air Marshal of the RAF in 2012. The Support Helicopter Force is under the direction of Joint Helicopter Command, whereas other elements on the station are under the RAF's No. 2 Group (Air Combat Support).

=== Support Helicopter Force (SHF) ===
The station is home to No. 33 Squadron forming part of the RAF's Support Helicopter Force.

No. 28 Squadron is the Boeing Chinook HC6A OCU. It receives crews from No. 1 Flying Training School at RAF Shawbury and builds on their existing skills learnt from basic and advanced helicopter training to qualify them on the Chinook. Flying operations are supported by units such as No. 22 Squadron (the Operational Evaluation Unit for all helicopter types within Joint Aviation Command) and Medium Support Helicopter Aircrew Training Facility which operates a variety of simulators.

No. 606 (Chiltern) Squadron (RAuxAF) is a reserve unit that provides personnel in ground-support roles to assist the Support Helicopter Force.

=== Basic flying training ===
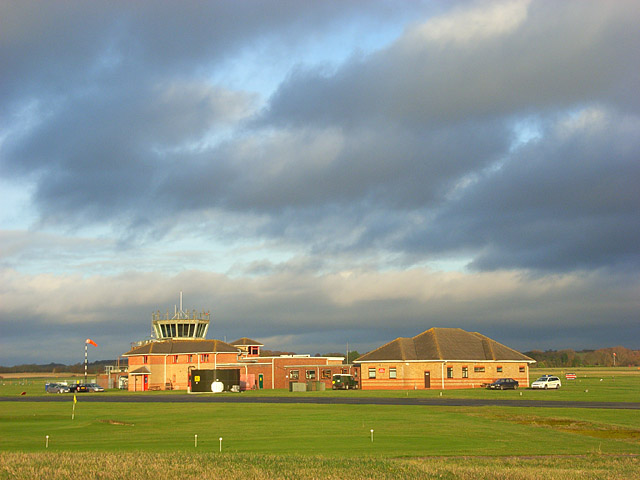
RAF Benson control tower and associated buildings in 2008

RAF Benson is also home to the Grob Tutor T1 light training aircraft of the Oxford University Air Squadron and No. 6 Air Experience Flight. The units offer basic flying training to University undergraduates and graduates and encourage members to embark upon a career in the RAF.

=== Civilian flying ===
The National Police Air Service (NPAS) operate an Airbus H135 helicopter from Benson. Prior to the establishment of the NPAS in October 2012, a Eurocopter Squirrel of the Chiltern Air Support Unit had been based at Benson since March 1998. Thames Valley Air Ambulance (TVAA) which moved from White Waltham Airfield in January 2007 and also operates the Airbus H135.

RAF Benson Flying Club (RAFBFC) operate a number of civilian registered light aircraft from the site. The club is open to current and former members of the regular armed forces, current and former members of the reserves, MOD civil servants, MOD contractors, current members of UAS, URNU or UOTCs, members of other nation's armed forces serving in the UK as well as spouses and dependants of armed forces personnel. The club conducts both flying training activity and private, pleasure flying.

== Based units ==
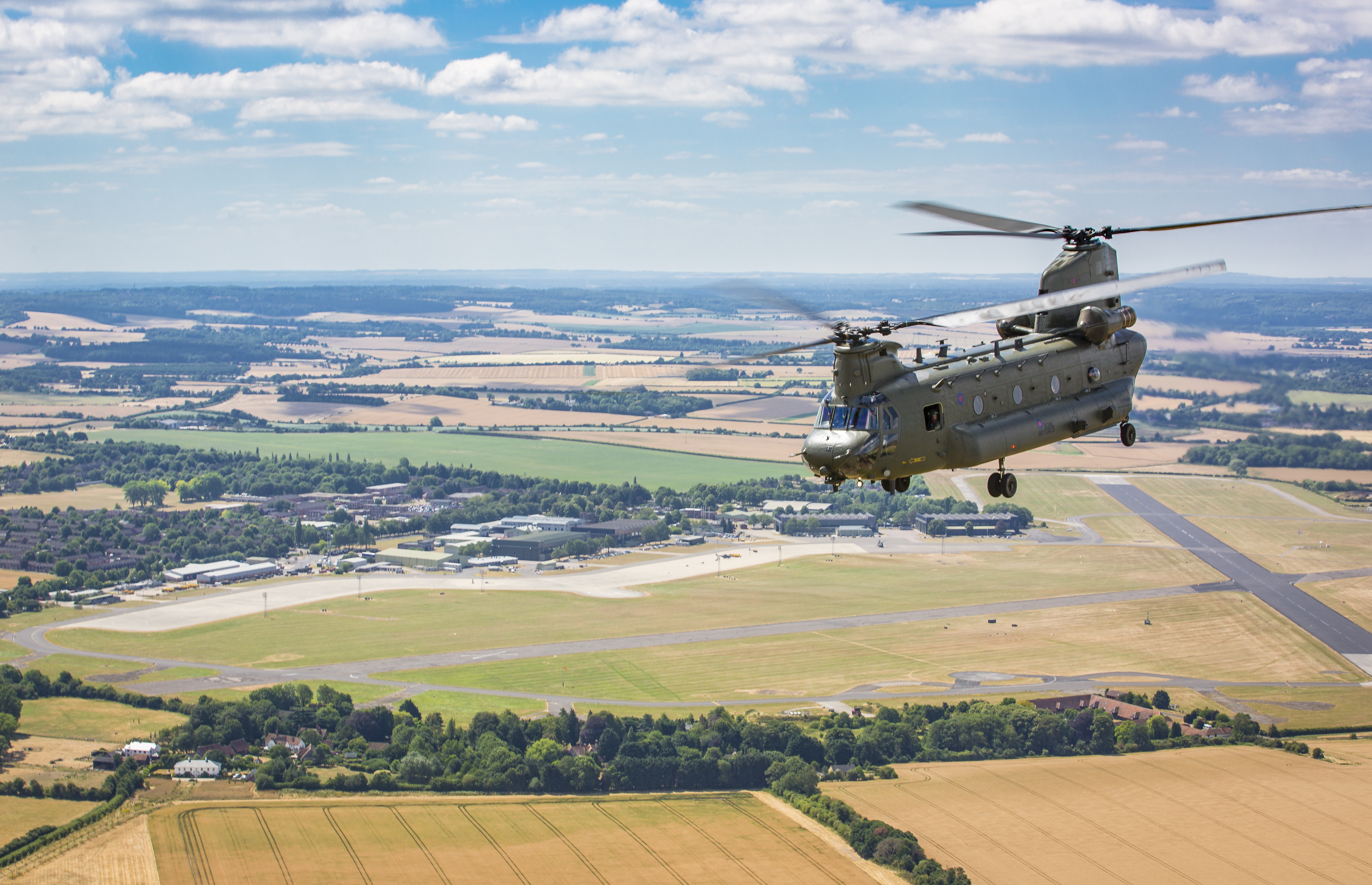
A Boeing Chinook HC4 of No. 28 Squadron departing RAF Benson during 2018

Flying and notable non-flying units based at RAF Benson.

=== Royal Air Force ===
Joint Aviation Command (JAC)

- Support Helicopter Force
  - No. 22 Squadron – JAC Operational Evaluation Unit
  - No. 28 Squadron – Chinook HC6A
  - No. 606 (Chiltern) Squadron (Royal Auxiliary Air Force)
  - Joint Helicopter Support Squadron
  - Medium Support Helicopter Aircrew Training Facility
  - Support Helicopter Standards Evaluation Wing

No. 22 Group (Training) RAF

- No. 6 Flying Training School
  - Oxford University Air Squadron – Grob Tutor T1
  - No. 6 Air Experience Flight – Grob Tutor T1

=== Civilian ===
- National Police Air Service – Airbus H135
- RAF Benson Flying Club – Slingsby T67 Firefly, de Havilland Canada DHC-1 Chipmunk, Diamond DA40 and Piper PA-28
- Thames Valley Air Ambulance – Airbus H135

== Heritage ==
=== Station badge and motto ===
RAF Benson's badge, awarded in August 1955, features a red rampant lion against the backdrop of an escallop. The lion relates to the Manor of Benson, having been granted in the 13th century to the Earl of Cornwall in whose Armorial Bearings a lion appears. The escallop, which is symbolic of early pilgrims, refers to the mobility function of this station.

The station's motto (Spectemur agendo) is in Latin and translates as "Let us be known by our actions".

=== Gate guardian ===
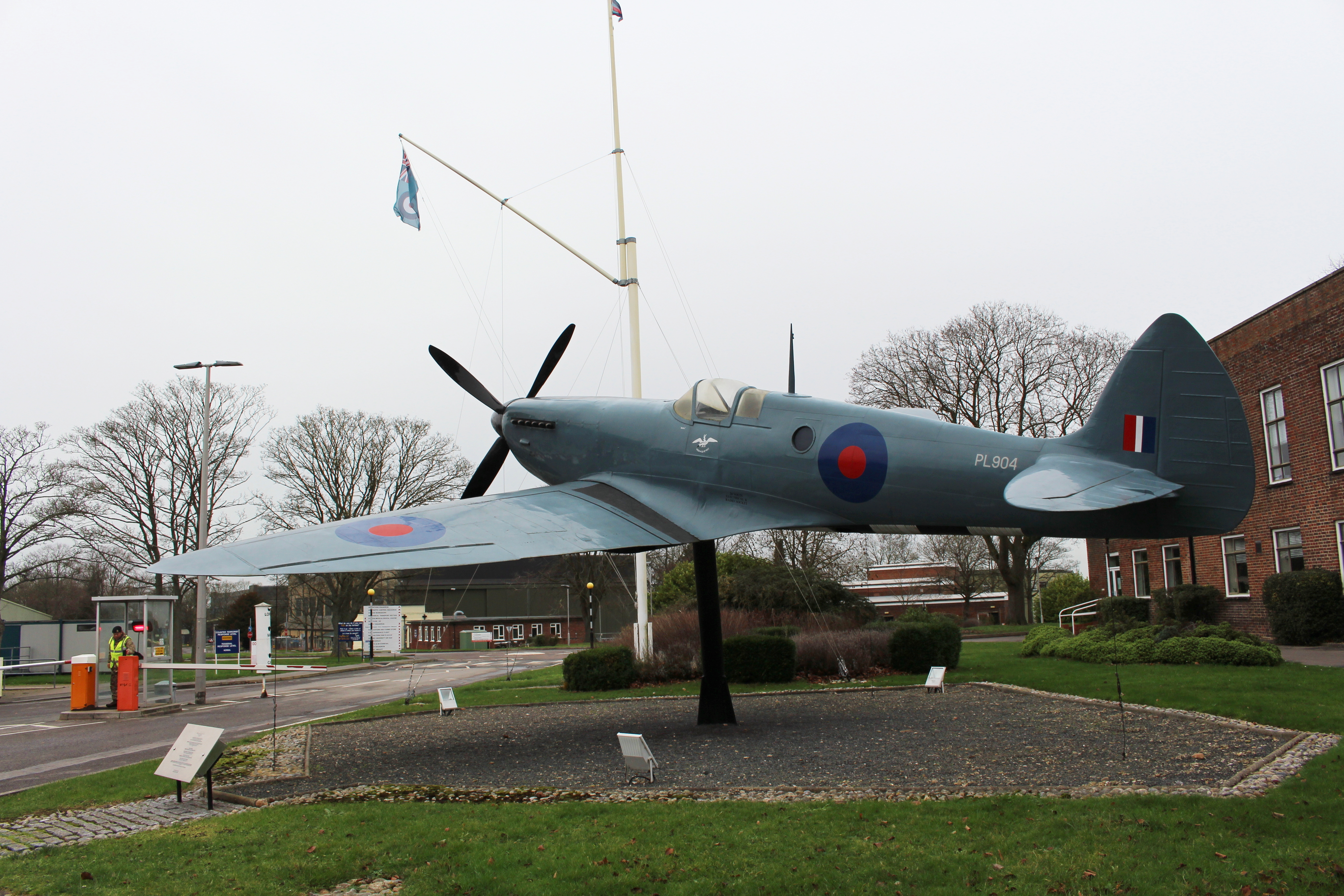
A replica Supermarine Spitfire PR.Mk XI which acts as RAF Benson's gate guardian

Since 2012, Benson's gate guardian has been a full-scale replica of a wartime Supermarine Spitfire PR.Mk XI. It carries the markings of Flight Lieutenant Duncan McCuaig who died while conducting a photographic reconnaissance mission over Bremen in Germany as part of Operation Crossbow. This aircraft replaced a genuine Spitfire PR.Mk XIX that was being restored to flying status.

=== Built heritage ===
The station is home to two K8 telephone kiosks which are grade II listed. They are described by Historic England as "intact examples of the K8 model kiosk, an inventive modernist adaptation of Sir Giles Gilbert Scott's classic K6 design".

== See also ==
- List of Royal Air Force stations

== Sources ==
- Falconer, J (2012). RAF Airfields of World War 2. UK: Ian Allan Publishing. ISBN 978-1-85780-349-5.
- Lambert, Mark (1993). Jane's All The World's Aircraft 1993–94. Coulsdon, UK: Jane's Data Division. ISBN 0-7106-1066-1.
- Marriott, Leo (1997). British Military Airfields – Then and Now. Shepperton, Surrey: Ian Allan Publishing. ISBN 978-0-7110-2515-8.
- Ritchie, Berry (1997). The Good Builder: The John Laing Story. London: James & James. OCLC 60198571.
- Sweetman, John (1982). Operation Chastise. London: Jane's. ISBN 978-0-86720-557-2.
