= Oxford University Air Squadron =

University flying squadron of the Royal Air Force

- Active: 1925–1939; 1940–present
- Country: United Kingdom
- Branch: Royal Air Force
- Role: Training
- Part of: No. 6 Flying Training School RAF
- Garrison/HQ: RAF Benson
- Mottos: Αεροβατω Και Περιφρονω Τον Ηλιον (Ancient Greek: "I walk on air and contemplate the sun")

Commanders
- Current commander: Sqn Ldr E. R. Hoogewerf

Aircraft flown
- Trainer: Grob Tutor T1

The Oxford University Air Squadron, abbreviated Oxford UAS, or OUAS, formed on 11th October 1925, is the training unit of the Royal Air Force at the University of Oxford and forms part of the Royal Air Force Volunteer Reserve. OUAS is one of fifteen University Air Squadrons that are spread out across Great Britain and it recruits from the universities at Oxford (Oxford University and Oxford Brookes), Reading University and Buckinghamshire New University.

== Present day ==
University Air Squadrons offer basic flying training and adventure training to undergraduates and graduates and encourage members to take up a career as an officer in one of the branches of the Royal Air Force.

Some members of OUAS hold the title of Officer Cadet, which carries the privileges, but not the rank, of a commissioned officer, while some other members are also granted commissions in the RAF Volunteer Reserve, with the rank of Acting Pilot Officer. Officer Cadets are required to attend a minimum of one training night a week during full term, usually a lecture by a guest speaker on an aspect of the Royal Air Force or another military unit. They are also expected to take part in two weeks of continuous training during the Long Vacation. There are also camps during all university vacations for sports, flying and adventure training.

OUAS is based at RAF Benson alongside its daughter unit 6 Air Experience Flight, and is equipped with the Grob Tutor T1. Each officer cadet is offered a Summer Vacation Attachment of one week at another RAF base, seconded to an active regular unit.

== History ==
The Squadron was founded on 11 October 1925 (the second oldest after Cambridge University Air Squadron) and initially had 24 students. The first summer camps were based at RAF Manston from 1925 up to 1931. The squadron disbanded just before the Second World War broke out in September 1939 but then was reformed in September 1940 to provide flying training to students. OUAS was an important source of pilots in the lead up to the Battle of Britain. As members of the RAFVR, cadets were called up for active service before completing their degrees.

Having first been based at Upper Heyford, then from 1932 at Abingdon, OUAS operated from Bicester Airfield until 1975, when it returned to Abingdon. Its present base is at RAF Benson where it has been since 1992.

In June 1951 Aidan Crawley the then Under-Secretary of Air presented the squadron its new badge to the Vice-Chancellor Dr J.Lowe (Dean of Christ Church, Oxford) just before the students headed for its annual camp.

Notable past members include Leonard Cheshire, Dinghy Young, Julian Amery, Lord Lyell VC, and the actors Richard Burton, Robert Hardy and Warren Mitchell. The 2012 RAF Aerobatic Display Team 'Red Arrows' Synchro Leader, Flt Lt Ben Plank, is also a former member.

Having originally been open only to members of the University of Oxford, in 1986 the Squadron was opened to members from the Oxford Polytechnic, which became Oxford Brookes University in 1993 and the University of Reading.

The squadrons' motto is 'Αεροβατω Και Περιφρονω Τον Ηλιον' (Greek: I walk on air and contemplate the sun.)

The unit previously flew the Avro 504N, Bristol F2b, DH9A, Atlas, Tutor, Hart, Audax, Hind, Tiger Moth II, Oxford, Chipmunk T Mk 10, Harvard T Mk 2b, Scottish Aviation Bulldog T.1. and currently flies the Grob Tutor T Mk 1

== Early history 1925–39 ==
In 1919 Hugh Trenchard, 1st Viscount Trenchard had the idea of forming squadrons at the universities with the object of encouraging an interest in flying and promoting and maintaining liaison with the universities in technical and research problems affecting aviation. The squadron was a civilian organization with a blazer and squadron tie as the only uniform.

1925

On 11 October a squadron was formed at Oxford with the object of attracting the first candidates for commissions to the Royal Air Force, the Royal Air Force Reserve and the Auxiliary Air Force, to simulate interest in air matters generally and to maintain liaison with the university.

Wing Commander H R Raikes, Sub Rector of Exeter College, was appointed as Commanding Officer and Chief Instructor with Squadron Leader A G Weir to help him. Courses of practical instruction were provided during term time but actual flying was only practised in the long vacation. An entrance fee of only £1 was charged and the total cost of setting up the squadron was £4000. The first headquarters was built at Manor Road which remained the HQ for many years.

1926

The success of the squadron was guaranteed by the enthusiasm with the first members embarked on their ground instruction on the various types of engines, instruments and accessories under the guidance of Sgt J B Acres and Sgt T I Devison. In July the squadron set off for its first annual camp at RAF Manston where the members were flown in Avro 504 loaned, with instructions by the air force. These early Avros were the 504k model with rotary engine which were reported to cover the pilot with castor oil and smell so badly that many a novice pilot felt very sick. It is obvious from early flying program that squadron members were very keen enough to be in the air by 6 am flew until 1pm and then took part in sporting activities until dinner. The squadron achieved a total of 205 hours in the camp period. The camp was judged to be a great success not only with the pilots but with the station and locals as well; the annual camp was held at Manston for a few more years.

1927

There had been so much interest in flying shown by undergraduates that when an aircraft landed on the Ferry Hinksey Road in Oxford and offered joy rides the undergraduates flocked out. Only a few were able to fly before the university authorities intervened and banned any further flying by undergraduates. Members of the UAS, however, were allowed to fly with the squadron provided their experiences were restricted to dual flying out of term time. It was not until several years later that solo flying was eventually permitted during term time. The universities were afraid that undergraduates were not taking aviation seriously and indeed one of the reasons for banning flights over the city of Oxford was that the embryo pilots might indulge in some 'dangerous aerial gymnastics'. Towards the end of the year, the authorities allowed dual flying in term time for members of the squadron and 4 Avro 504N aircraft were accordingly installed at Upper Heyford for their use. Membership had now risen to 75 members and some 400 hours had been flown in the year.

The annual camp was held again at Manston and on average each member was receiving about 1.5 hours flying per day interspersed with lectures on rigging, engines and airmanship. Improvements over the camp of the previous year were reported, one of which was the Hucks starter. this device stood on a movable base - Ford Model T and then driven out to an aircraft awaiting to be started up.

The aircraft flown in 1927 was the Avro 504N's, with the Lynx engine, the radial engine which was a great improvement on the model of the previous year. The squadron also had the use of a single Bristol F.2 Fighter.

In these early days at camp there were occasional accidents including a collision on the ground between an Avro and a Vickers Virginia but the general tone of the reports was that such misfortunes were inevitable and it was "fortunate that none of the undergraduates was really hurt".

At the end of the year 2 Napier engines were presented to the Squadron by H T Vance and Sir Harry Britten, directors of Napiers, for instructional purposes.

1928

In January Wing Commander Garrod took over as Chief Instructor, at the halfway point of his distinguished service career. Shortly afterwards, Miss Round was engaged as squadron secretary, a post she was to hold for 34 years. Already around this time friendly rivalry with Cambridge University Air Squadron was starting with plans of an air navigation contest and talk of "Aerial Blues" and the athletic ability of the squadron was formidable, including such names as Hugh Edwards (rower), the oarsmen, and his brother E C Edwards who won the King's Cup when he just left the squadron. Other early members were W Rathbone, Douglas Dodds-Parker, later Member of Parliament, and P Yorke who was so taken with first solo flight at the 1927 camp that he refused to land. When he eventually alighted mechanics were sent out to seize the wing-tips of his aircraft but he took off again.

The squadron was well established in its 'hangar' headquarters at Manor Road, Oxford where ground instruction was given on 2 aeroplanes and 6 engines which members dismantled and put together again.

1929

The squadron was recognized by the university as a 'permanent institution' thus putting it on an equal footing with the Officers' Training Corps, by approving a statue to add the name of the Commanding Officer of the squadron as a member of the Delegacy of Military Instruction (DMI). Even more hours were flown at Manston during camp (1105) and the press were invited to visit. For the camp the squadron had 8 Lynx Avros, 2 Bristol Fighters (service type) and one Bristol Fighter dual control with slotted wing. Back in Oxford a new lecture hall adjoining the hangar was opened at Manor Road by Secretary of State for Air, Christopher Thomson, 1st Baron Thomson.

The squadron had 10 Rhodes scholars on its strength, 2 Rugby Blues, a Rowing Blue and 2 Boxing Blues. Three members decided to make the RAF their permanent career and completed their initial training with distinction.

1930–31

These 2 years saw an increase in the number and variety of outside lectures who visited the squadron at Manor Road, Major Scott on handling of airships and Mr D R Pye on the development of aero engine. In 1931 the squadron went to RAF Eastchurch for the first time on what was described an 'annual holiday training'. Wing Commander R M Hill has now taken over the squadron which was conferred the privilege of bearing the university arms on the aircraft.

1932

The squadron visited Eastchurch again for summer camp and flew over 1300 hours, some of which were on the newly introduced Armstrong Whitworth Atlas. This aircraft replaced the Bristol fighter as an advanced 2-seat trainer. However the year was really singled out by the move, in November from Upper Heyford to RAF Abingdon as the permanent flying base. The squadron aircraft were led in formation by the squadron commander Wing Commander Keith Park in an Atlas carrying as passenger the Vice-Chancellor, Rev F J Lys, who, at the age of 70, was reported to be reluctant to leave the machine. The squadron's 5 Avro Lynx followed behind.

1933–35

To give special incentive to squadron members to gain proficiency in flying John Siddeley, 1st Baron Kenilworth presented the squadron with a magnificent trophy to be won by the member who has judged to be the best all-round pilot, this trophy is still presented today. In the spring of 1934 the Avro Tutor was introduced by which time the squadron had trained some 240 pilots and flown 15,000 hours.

At the end of 1934 with the expansion of the Air Force the established strength of the squadron was increased to allow those who were seeking permanent commission to join the squadron without restricting the number of ordinary members. These recruits would then go to a special course at RAF Cranwell after completing 70 hours flying with the air squadron.

For summer camp in 1935 the squadron again went to Eastchurch under the command of Wing Commander C N Lowe.

1936–38

For the 1936 camp at Eastchurch the squadron had 3 Harts or 'service types' for flying the more advanced members. In the spring of 1937 Flight Lieutenant H J Fitzpatrick joined the staff as the first returning ex-member as instructor and adjutant. The squadron went to Ford, West Sussex for camp and accommodated for the first time in tents.

With a total of 80 members, the squadron needed extra aircraft for the camp in 1938, again at Ford, and 3 Harts, 2 Hinds, 1 Audax and 14 Tutors were brought on strength. The extra flying had its penalties in incidents which seem curious nowadays; one Tutor was damaged while taxying because the student's goggles were blurred by rain, one Hart burst a tyre on landing because of flints on the airfield and the aircraft were saved from wind damage on one blustery day by parking Military Transport vehicles in front of them to form a wind break. During the camp members visited the aircraft carrier HMS Courageous (50) at sea.

1939

In the year of the outbreak of war the squadron was more active than ever. Some of the senior members were sent to the RAFVR Flying School at Kidlington to gain flying experience on Harts during term time. The Annual Dinner was the largest so far with 300 people at present and was a great success. There were now familiar incidents of forced landings and an undershoot by a student 'trying to prolong his glide by pulling his nose up'. Camp was held at Lympne Airport just before the squadron closed down on 16 September on the outbreak of hostilities.

== The War Years 1940–45 ==
1940

In September 1940 the squadron was re-opened to take in the short courses for ground training to the standard of the RAF Initial Training School "Wings" syllabus. About 100 members were taken in, under the commander of Squadron Leader H R A Edwards.

1941–45

The pattern of training on the squadron was similar throughout the war. Large courses of short duration were organized for the undergraduates to give them a grounding in many of the subjects they would need as RAF pilots. Up to 300 were eventually taken on each course of some 6 months duration.

It was thought a good idea to give potential fighter pilots some practice at shooting in preparation for air to air combat and so a clay pigeon shoot was organized every Saturday. This grew to become a match against Cambridge UAS and eventually the squadron rented (for a nominal sum) Lord Hardcourt's shoot at Nuneham.

In May 1943 the squadron marched through Oxford as part of the parade for the Wings for Victory Week and was contributing to the war effort by training ever increasing numbers on the short courses, even giving the potential aircrew practice dinghy drill in the Cherwell off the lawn of the squadron headquarters. The effort expended on training can well be imagined when it is realized that over 2000 members passed through the squadron during the war, these include famous people Richard Burton, Robert Hardy and Warren Mitchell.

== Location ==
- 1925-1932 RAF Upper Heyford
- 1932-1939 RAF Abingdon
- 1940-1949 RAF Abingdon
- 1949-1958 RAF Kidlington (now Oxford Airport)
- 1958-1975 RAF Bicester (now Bicester Airfield)
- 1975-1992 RAF Abingdon
- 1992–Present RAF Benson

== Commanding officers ==
- 1925–1928: Wing Commander Humphrey Raikes
- 1932: Wing Commander K. R. Park
- 1940: Squadron Leader H. R. A. Edwards
- 1948–1951: Christopher Foxley-Norris
- 1951–1953: Frank Willan
- 1953–1956: Wing Commander Nelson Edwards
- 1956–1958: Wing Commander Constable Maxwell
- 1958–1960: Wing Commander A. J. Douch
- 1960–1963: Wing Commander R. P. Harding
- 1963–1965: Wing Commander R. Whittain
- 1965–1967: Wing Commander H. B. Iles
- 1967–1969: Wing Commander M. R. Williams
- 1969–1971: Squadron Leader D. C. E. England
- 1971–1974: Squadron Leader A. N. S. Parker-Ashley
- 1974-1976 Squadron Leader W. A. Bell
- 1976-1979 Squadron Leader J. R. Day
- 1979-1982 Squadron Leader H. G. Harvey
- 1982-1985 Squadron Leader G. L. Margiotta
- 1985-1988 Squadron Leader P. F. Heatley
- 1988-1990 Squadron Leader P. J. Lander
- 1990-1994 Squadron Leader J. D. Smithson
- 1994-1997 Squadron Leader J. E. Robinson
- 1997-1999 Squadron Leader K. R. H. Girdwood
- 1999-2003 Squadron Leader P. Q. Hallett
- 2003-2005 Squadron Leader D. F. Goodman
- 2005-2010 Squadron Leader P. J. Barrett
- 2010-2013 Squadron Leader G. M. Militis
- 2013-2014 Squadron Leader R. D. Stookman
- 2014 Squadron Leader M. Palmer
- 2015 Squadron Leader A. Robertson
- 2015-2017 Squadron Leader A. M. Duncan
- 2017-2019 Squadron Leader P. A. Butterfield
- 2019-2023 Squadron Leader S. D. Martin
- 2023-2025 Squadron Leader C. Aston
- 2025- Squadron Leader E. R. Hoogewerf

== Notable members ==
Military:
- Gp Capt Leonard Cheshire, Baron Cheshire, RAF Officer and Victoria Cross holder
- Capt Lord Lyell VC, Army Officer and Victoria Cross holder
- MRAF David Craig, Baron Craig of Radley, Marshal of the Royal Air Force and Chief of the Defence Staff
- Air Chf Mshl Johnny Stringer (RAF officer), RAF Officer, and Supreme Allied Commander Europe
- Air Chf Mshl John Day (RAF officer), RAF Officer and Military advisor to BAE Systems
- Air Chf Mshl Roderic Hill, RAF Officer, former Rector of Imperial College and Vice-Chancellor of University of London.
- Air Chf Mshl Guy Garrod, RAF Officer and Former OUAS Chief instructor
- Air Mshl Timothy Garden, Baron Garden, RAF air marshal, Assistant Chief of the Defence Staff (Programmes) and Commandant of the Royal College of Defence Studies
- Air Mshl John Curtiss (RAF officer), RAF Officer, First navigator to reach the rank of Air marshal
- Gp Capt Hugh Verity, RAF Officer and SOE Pilot
- Gp Capt Sir Archibald Hope, 17th Baronet, RAF Officer
- Wg Cdr Andy Green, RAF Officer and Land Speed Record Holder in ThrustSSC
- Wg Cdr James Blackburn (RAF officer), RAF Officer
- Wg Cdr Archie Boyd, RAF Officer
- Wg Cdr Hugh John Beazley, RAF Officer
- Sqn Ldr Dinghy Young, RAF Officer and Distinguished Flying Cross (United Kingdom) holder
- Flt Lt Jeff Glover, Only British pilot to be captured by the Argentinians during the Falklands in Harrier XZ972
- Flt Lt Richard Hillary, RAF Officer and Author
- Flt Lt Will Cambridge, RAF Officer and Former Red Arrow
- Flt Lt Oliver Philpot, RAF Officer, Businessman and one of the three men to successfully escape from Stalag Luft III
- Flt Lt Colin Rawlins, RAF Officer and Director of Zoos of the Zoological Society of London from 1966 to 1984
- Fg Off Noel Agazarian, RAF Officer

Actors:

- Richard Burton, Actor
- Robert Hardy, Actor
- Warren Mitchell, Actor

Politicians:

- Julian Amery, Baron Amery of Lustleigh and Politician
- John Gorton, Prime Minister of Australia (1968–71)
- Bob Hawke, Prime Minister of Australia (1983–91)
- Douglas Dodds-Parker, Sir and Politician
- Rory Stewart, Diplomat, Politician, Broadcaster, Author, Academic
- Richard Graham (politician), Politician
- John Profumo, Politician
- Timothy Garden, Baron Garden, RAF Officer and Politician
- Hardwicke Holderness, RAF Officer and Politician
- Hugh Beadle, Lawyer, Politician and Judge
- Robin Hooper, WWII RAF Pilot and career diplomat

Athletes:

- Hugh Edwards (rower), Olympic Rower
- Nicole Burger, RAF Officer, First South African Olympian to qualify for the winter games in skeleton
- Cyril Lowe, English rugby union footballer who held England's international try scoring record for over sixty years and Former OUAS Chief instructor
- Reggie Tongue (racing driver), RAF Officer and British racing driver

Other:

- Chris and Alex van Tulleken, TV Personalities/Doctors
- David Beaty (author), Author and Pioneer of Human Factors Training
- Godfrey Smith (journalist), Journalist
- Bill Bradfield, Australian civil and aviation engineer
- Geoffrey Gaut, Scientist
- James R. A. Bailey, RAF Officer and Founder of DRUM (South African magazine)
- James Chadwin, Barrister, whose cases included defending Peter Sutcliffe, the "Yorkshire Ripper"

== See also ==
- University Air Squadron units
- University Royal Naval Unit, the Royal Navy equivalent
- Officers Training Corps, the British Army equivalent
- List of Royal Air Force aircraft squadrons
