= Joint Helicopter Support Squadron =

- Squadron badge
- Active: 1982 – present
- Country: United Kingdom
- Branch: British Army; Royal Air Force
- Type: Joint service unit
- Role: Helicopter support
- Part of: Joint Aviation Command
- Home station: RAF Benson
- Motto(s): Together we deliver
- Website: Official website

The Joint Helicopter Support Squadron (JHSS) is a joint organisation of the British Army and the Royal Air Force, located at RAF Benson in Oxfordshire.

== History ==
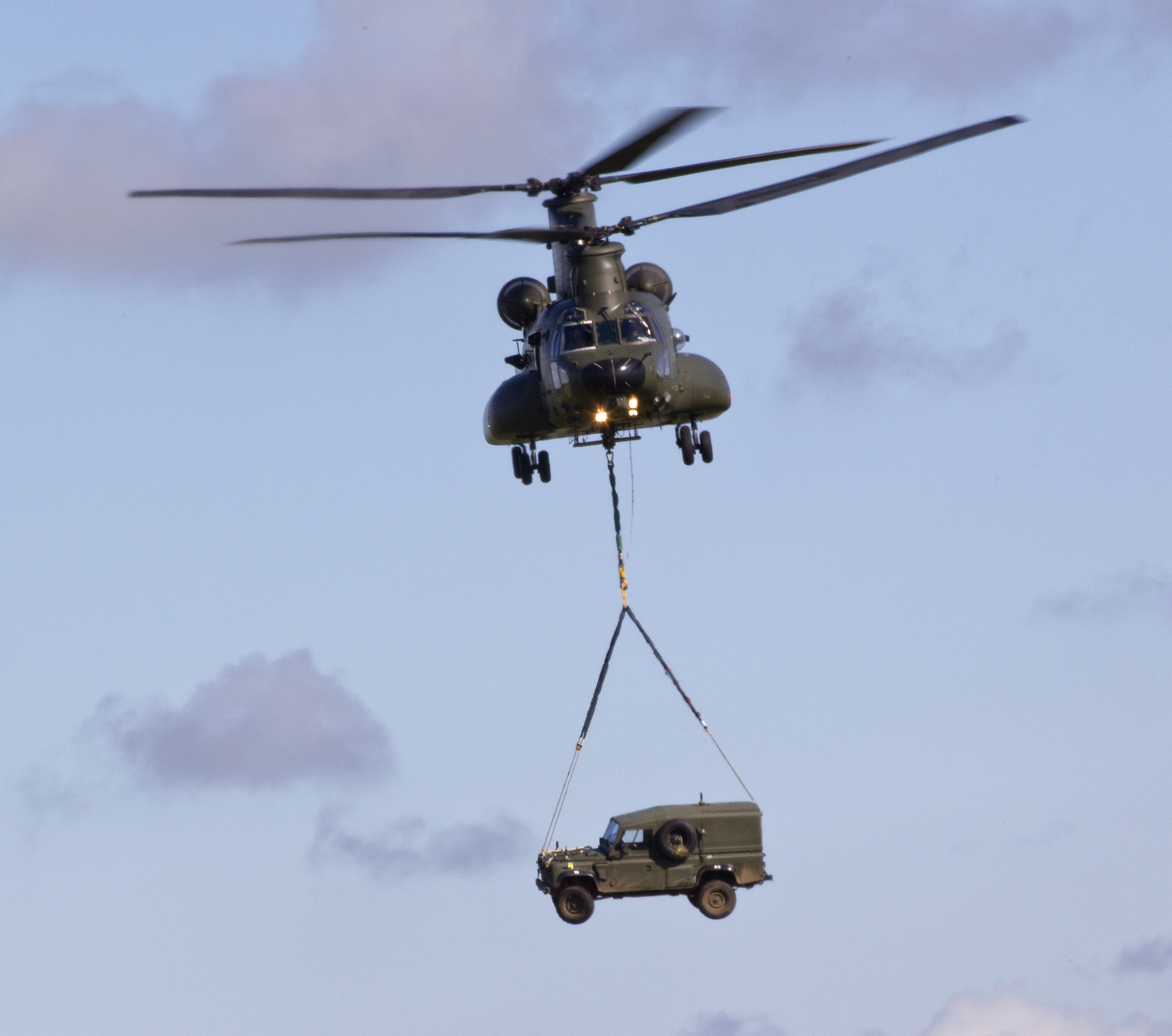
A Royal Air Force Chinook carrying a British Army Land Rover as an under slung load.

Following the introduction of the Boeing Chinook HC.1, the unit was formed in July 1982 during the Falklands War as the Joint Helicopter Support Unit (JHSU). Personnel were drawn from the Royal Corps of Transport and Royal Army Ordnance Corps (both now amalgamated into the Royal Logistic Corps) plus the Royal Corps of Signals and the Royal Air Force. After the war the unit was officially formed at RAF Odiham in Hampshire and RAF Gütersloh in Germany.

In September 2009, the unit became the Joint Helicopter Support Squadron (JHSS) following its merger with the RAF's Mobile Air Operations Team (MAOT).

During 2016 the squadron moved from RAF Odiham to RAF Benson in Oxfordshire.

== Role and operations ==
The squadron is tasked with providing a ground support capability to Joint Aviation Command's support helicopter force, including specialist skills in under-slung load operations and preparation of landing sites. It has two teams on very high readiness which are able to contribute to contingency (largely unforeseen) operations at short notice, such as natural disaster relief.
