= No. 606 Squadron RAuxAF =

No. 606 (Chiltern) Squadron RAF
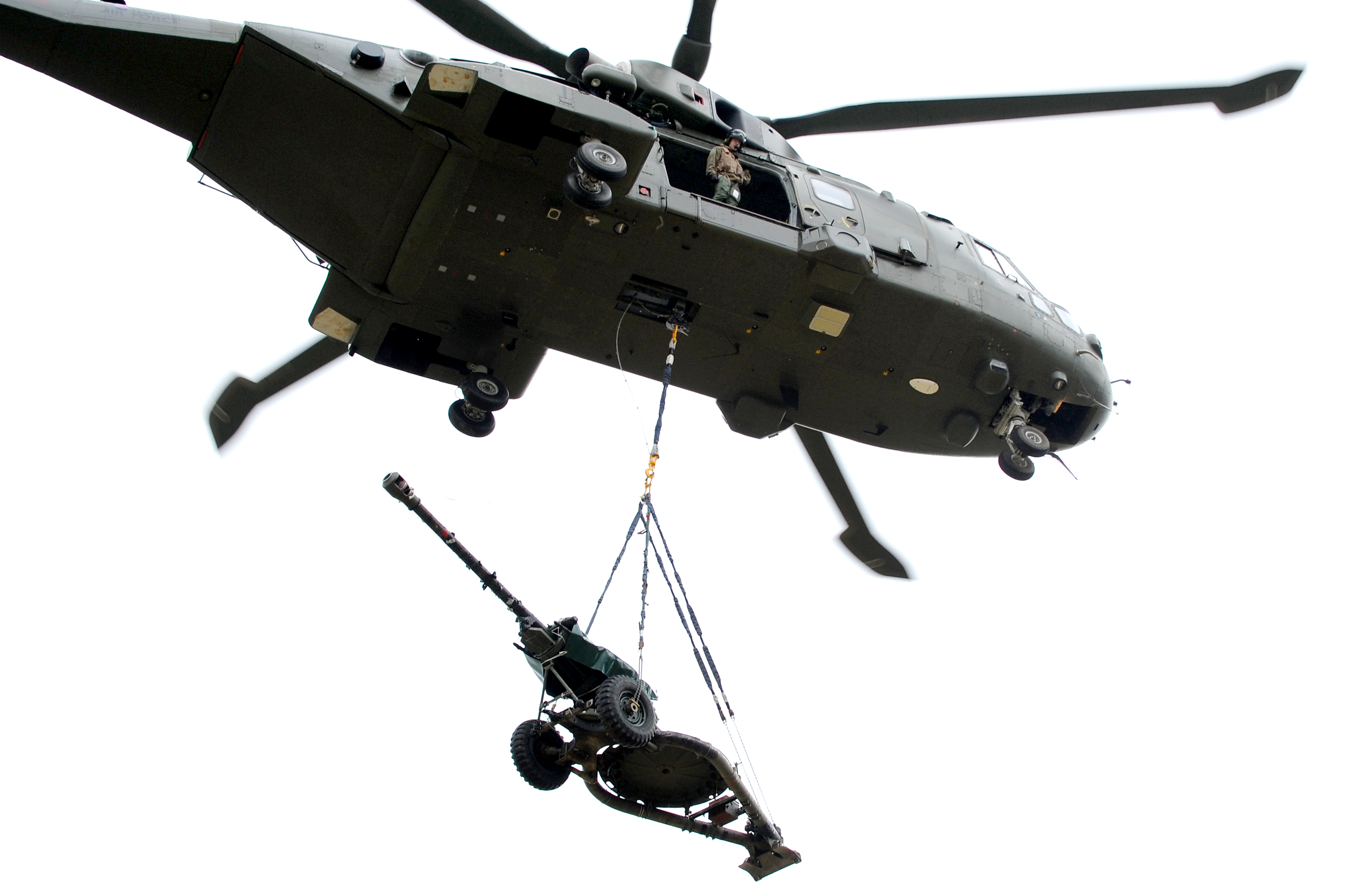
- Merlin Helicopter carrying 105mm Light Gun with staff from No. 606 Squadron
- Active: 1 October 1999 – present
- Country: United Kingdom
- Branch: Royal Air Force
- Part of: Royal Auxiliary Air Force
- Garrison/HQ: RAF Benson
- Motto(s): Steadfast in support

Commanders
- Honorary Air Commodore: Lynda Atkins, DL

Insignia
- Squadron Badge heraldry: A red kite grasping a lightning flash
- Squadron Codes: BG (Apr 1939 – Sep 1939)

No 606 (Chiltern) Squadron was formed as a Royal Auxiliary Air Force helicopter support squadron in 1996 at RAF Benson and gaining its official number three years later on 1 October 1999. It provides personnel for the RAF tactical support helicopter fleet and does not operate any aircraft itself.

== History ==
The squadron code 'BG' was allocated to No 606 Squadron RAuxAF in 1939, but it was never activated during the Second World War.

Since its reformation in 1996, personnel from the squadron have deployed on Operations across the globe including Afghanistan, the Falkland Islands, Cyprus and Iraq.

No. 606 was deployed to Brunei, to assist No. 1563 Flight RAF in their move from temporary home base in Rimba Air Force Base to Medicina Lines.
