= Dinghy Young =

Royal Air Force officer (1915–1943)

Squadron Leader Dinghy Young DFC & Bar
- Born: 20 May 1915; Belgravia, London, England
- Died: 17 May 1943 (aged 27) near Castricum, German-occupied Netherlands
- Military career
- Allegiance: United Kingdom
- Branch: Royal Air Force
- Service years: 1938–1943
- Rank: Squadron leader
- Nickname: Dinghy
- Conflicts: Second World War: European air campaign; Operation Chastise †
- Awards: Distinguished Flying Cross & Bar

Squadron Leader Henry Melvin "Dinghy" Young, DFC & Bar (20 May 1915 – 17 May 1943) was a bomber pilot in the Royal Air Force Volunteer Reserve during the Second World War.

== Early life ==
Young was born in Belgravia, London, to Henry George Melvin Young, a British solicitor, and Fannie Rowan Young. He was educated at Amesbury School in Hindhead, Westminster School class of 1933, Kent School in Kent, Connecticut class of 1932, and Trinity College, Oxford, where he was part of the winning crew of the 1938 Boat Race.

Though going normally by the name Melvin, he acquired the nickname "Dinghy" after coming down in the sea twice and surviving in inflatable dinghies.

== Royal Air Force service ==
Young qualified as a pilot as a member of the Oxford University Air Squadron, although the officer who trained him described him as "not a natural pilot". He joined the Royal Air Force Volunteer Reserve in 1938. After the outbreak of war in 1939, he began operational training. In June 1940, he joined No. 102 Squadron RAF, flying Armstrong Whitworth Whitley bombers. It was during this tour that he twice had to ditch his aircraft and take to a dinghy. The first occasion was on 7 October, when he was flying on a convoy escort mission over the Atlantic from a base in Northern Ireland. Young was forced to ditch his aircraft because of engine failure and the crew spent 22 hours in an inflatable dinghy before being rescued. The second occasion was in the English Channel, south of Plymouth. Young completed his tour in February 1941 and was awarded the Distinguished Flying Cross (DFC).

After serving in a training unit, Young was promoted to squadron leader and, in September 1941, began a tour with 104 Squadron, flying Vickers Wellingtons. He served in Egypt and Malta and, on completing his tour of duty, received a Bar to his DFC. In July 1942, he was sent to Washington, D.C. to serve as part of the RAF Delegation. Upon his return to the United Kingdom, he began training to fly the Avro Lancaster with a new crew. They all joined 57 Squadron in March 1943, where Young became a flight commander.

== Operation Chastise ==
Soon after joining No. 57 Squadron, he was transferred to No. 617 Squadron, specially formed for the purpose of carrying out Operation Chastise, the raid to attack German dams in the Ruhr Valley. Young, together with Henry Maudslay, carried out much of the organising work needed to form a new squadron but remained popular with his fellow officers.

On the night of the 16/17 May 1943, the raid took place. Young flew Avro Lancaster ED877 / AJ-A (code-named "A-Apple"). The other crew were Flight Sergeant Charles Walpole Roberts (Navigator), Flying Officer Vincent Sandford MacCausland (Bomb Aimer), Sergeant David Taylor Horsfall (Flight Engineer), Sergeant Lawrence William Nichols (Wireless Operator), Sergeant Gordon Arthur Yeo (Front Gunner) and Sergeant Wilfred Ibbotson (Rear Gunner). A-Apple flew as part of the first wave which attacked the Möhne Dam. Young was second in command of the raid, which was led by Wing Commander Guy Gibson flying G-George.

The first three aircraft to attack, Gibson (G-George), Hopgood (M-Mother) and Martin (P-Popsie), all missed the target. A-Apple was fourth to attack and hit the dam, causing a small breach. As this breach was not apparent, a fifth aircraft of Maltby (J-Johnny) subsequently attacked the dam and achieved a hit, causing a larger breach.

On the return journey, A-Apple was brought down by anti-aircraft fire, probably by gunners at Castricum-aan-Zee, who reported shooting down an aircraft at 2.58 am. The bodies of all seven crewmen washed up on the Dutch coast over the subsequent days and were buried in the Bergen General Cemetery, Bergen, North Holland.

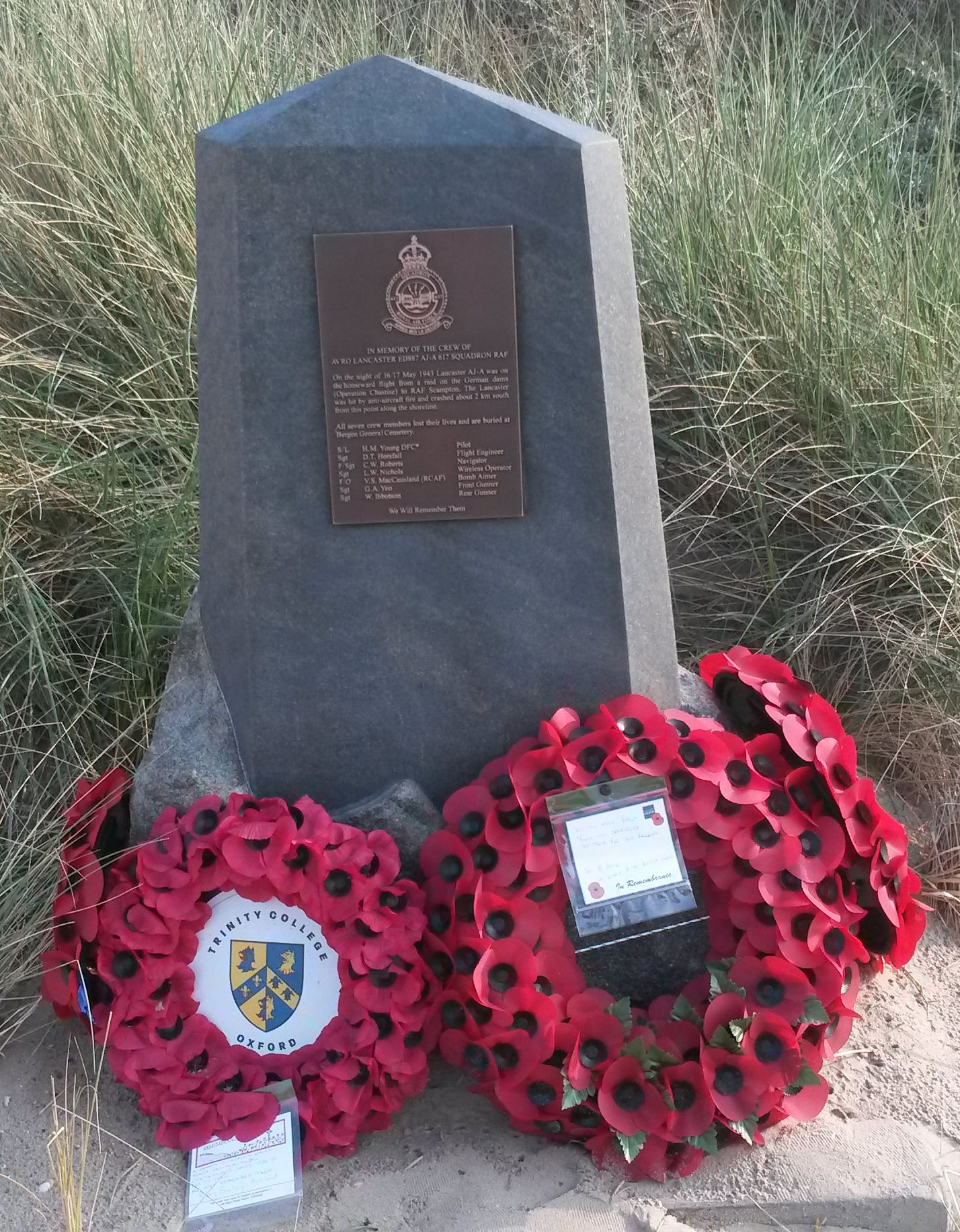
Memorial at Castricum aan Zee

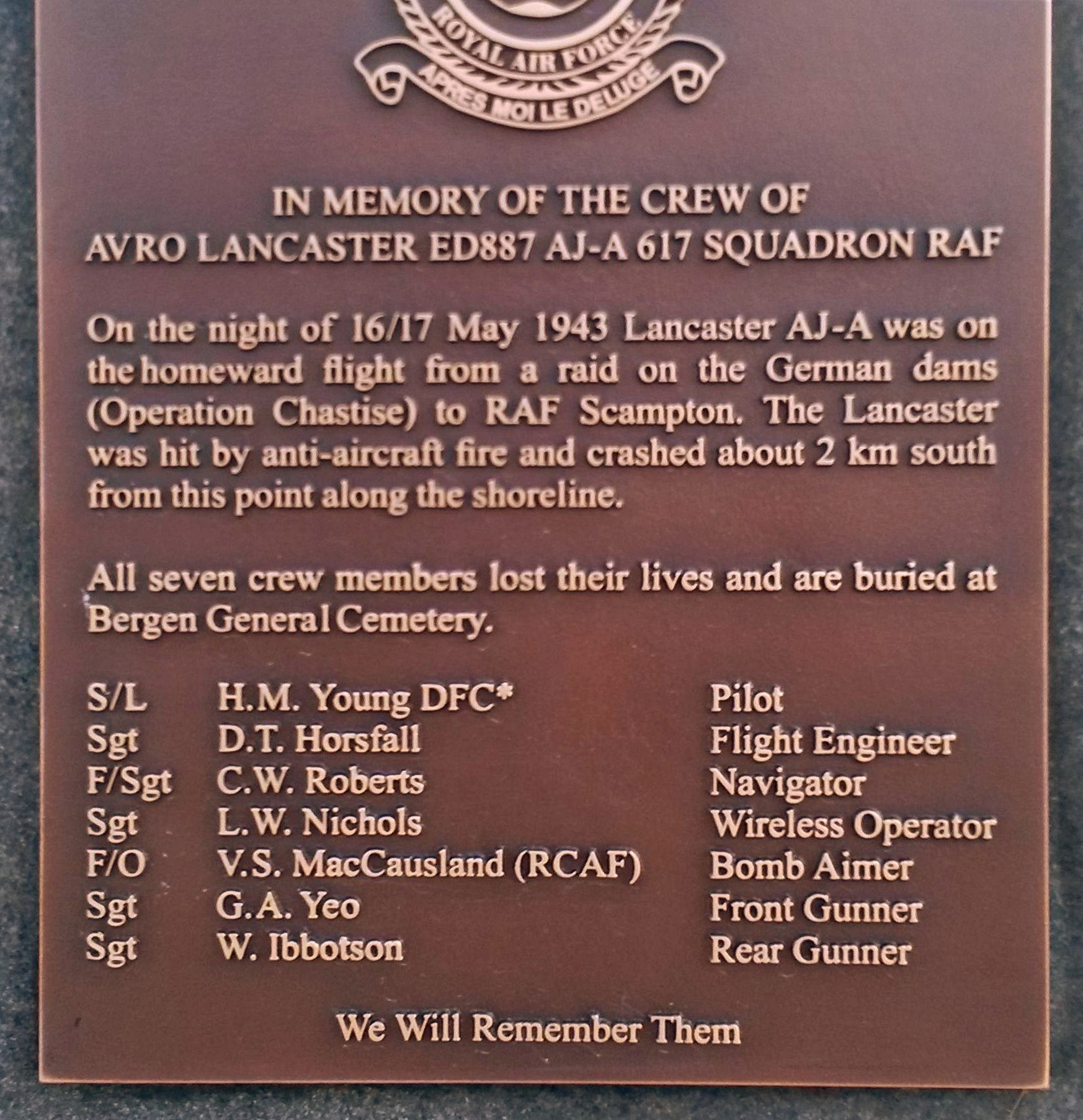
Memorial at Castricum aan Zee

== Personal life ==
Young married an old family friend, Priscilla Rawson, in 1942 while he was in Washington. He had previously met Priscilla during his time at Kent College. She remained in the United States when he returned to the United Kingdom.

== Honours and awards ==
- 9 May 1941 – Distinguished Flying Cross (DFC) – Acting Flight Lieutenant Henry Melvin Young (72478), Royal Air Force Volunteer Reserve, No. 102 Squadron.
- 18 September 1942 – Bar to the Distinguished Flying Cross – Squadron Leader Henry Melvin Young, DFC (72478), Royal Air Force Volunteer Reserve, No. 104 Squadron.

== Film portrayal ==
In the 1955 film The Dam Busters, Young was portrayed by Richard Leech.

== Citations ==
=== General references ===
- Leach, Ray (1991). "Who Was 'Dinghy' Young?". Air Enthusiast. No. 44. pp. 50–55. ISSN 0143-5450.
- Thorning, Arthur G. (2008). The Dambuster Who Cracked the Dam: The Story of Melvin 'Dinghy' Young. Casemate Publishers. ISBN 978-1-84468-212-6.
