= Hardwicke Holderness =

Lawyer and politician in Southern Rhodesia

Harold Hardwicke Clake Holderness, DSO, DFC, AFC (6 January 1915 – 21 March 2007) was a lawyer and liberal politician in Southern Rhodesia and a highly decorated wartime pilot in RAF Coastal Command.

== Background ==
Hardwicke Holderness was born in Salisbury (now Harare), Southern Rhodesia (now Zimbabwe). He was educated at Rhodes University College (now Rhodes University) and won a Rhodes Scholarship to Magdalen College, Oxford, where he joined the Oxford University Air Squadron and trained as a pilot.

== Second World War ==
At the outbreak of the Second WOrld War, he joined the RAF and served as a pilot, firstly in RAF Training Command and then later in RAF Coastal Command, serving in No. 502 Squadron RAF. He was awarded the Distinguished Service Order (DSO), Distinguished Flying Cross (United Kingdom) and Air Force Cross (United Kingdom), and finished the war with the rank of a wing commander. .

His DSO citation read:

Wing Cdr. Holderness has commanded his squadron for a considerable period. He has taken part in many of the sorties completed by the squadron. These have been mainly anti-shipping patrols over the Bay of Biscay and the Atlantic. In October, 1944, Wing Cdr. Holderness attacked an enemy vessel in the Skagerrak, and in November, 1944, he bombed a beached U boat. He has completed many other attacks on enemy ships, some of them in the face of intense opposition. As a pilot and as squadron commander this officer has always displayed outstanding determination, leadership and courage.

After the war he returned to Southern Rhodesia and became a leading lawyer, and in 1948 married Elspeth Macdiarmid with whom he had two daughters.

== Politics ==
He was a strong advocate for full racial equality, founding in 1953 the Interracial Association of Southern Rhodesia.

In the 1954 general election he was elected as an MP for Garfield Todd's ruling United Rhodesia Party, and was considered to be the most liberal member of the party. He served as an MP until Garfield Todd was forced out of government in 1958.

== Later life ==
In 1975, he left Rhodesia and settled first in Oxford before moving to Cheltenham, where in the 1980s he wrote his memoir about postwar Rhodesia Lost Chance: Southern Rhodesia 1945–1958 (1985).
