= No. 6 Air Experience Flight RAF =

No. 6 Air Experience Flight
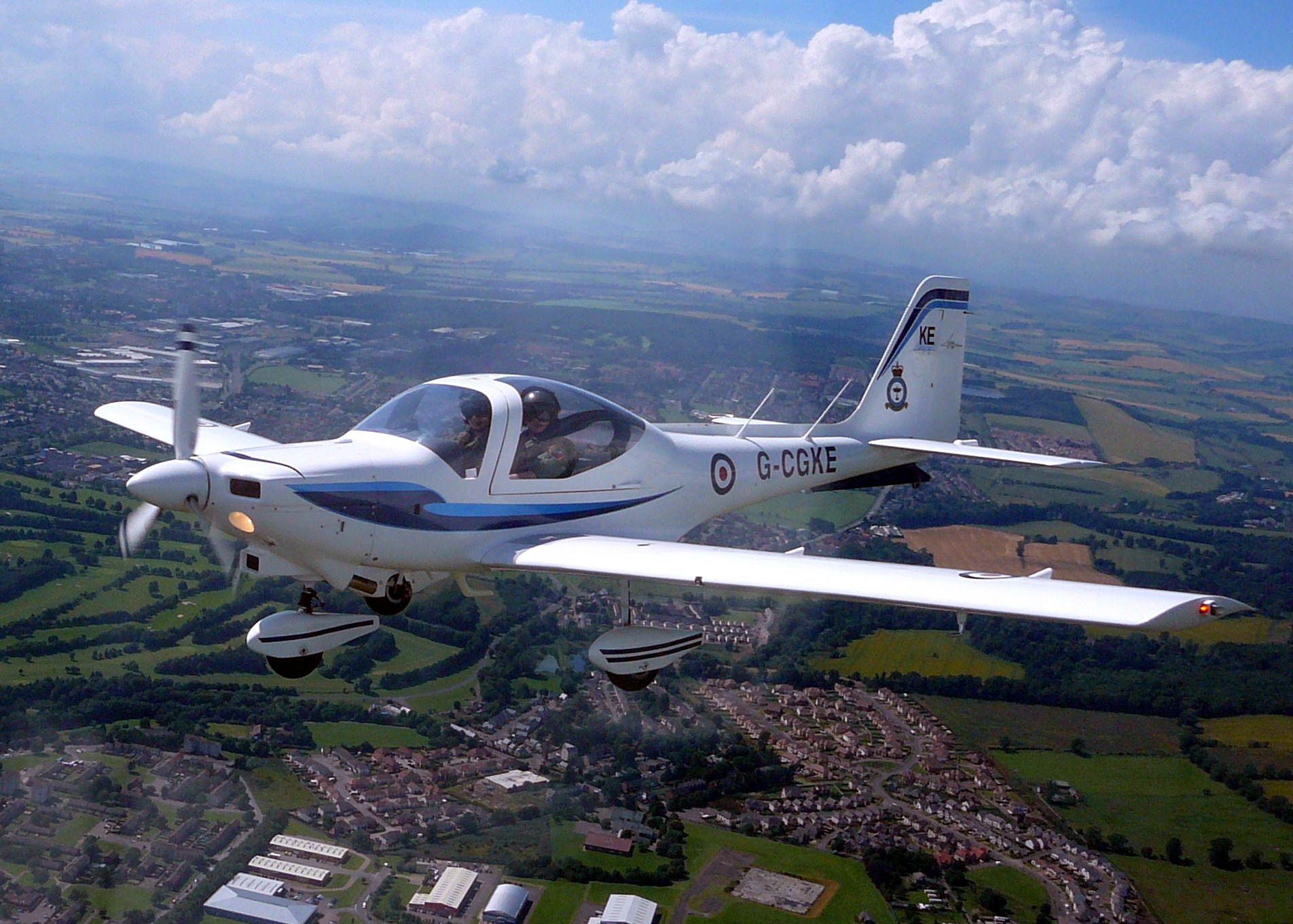
- Grob Tutor aircraft similar to that flown by 6 AEF
- Active: 8 September 1958 - Present
- Country: United Kingdom
- Allegiance: Royal Air Force
- Branch: No. 6 Flying Training School RAF
- Role: Training
- Part of: Oxford University Air Squadron
- Garrison/HQ: RAF Benson

Aircraft flown
- Trainer: Grob Tutor

No. 6 Air Experience Flight (6 AEF) is an Air Experience Flight based at RAF Benson.

It is one of twelve Air Experience Flights run by the Air Cadet Organisation of the Royal Air Force.

It was formed in the 1950s, along with the other AEFs, with the aim of teaching basic flying to members of the Air Training Corps, Combined Cadet Force (RAF Section) and occasionally, the Girls Venture Corps Air Cadets and the Air Scouts. It has been based at RAF Benson since 1992. It is used primarily to deliver Air Experience Flights to cadets and is parented by the Oxford University Air Squadron.

== History ==
Formed on 8 September 1958 at White Waltham Airfield, the squadron moved to RAF Abingdon in 1973 and then to RAF Benson in 1992. From 26 November 1995 it was parented by London University Air Squadron but when London UAS moved to RAF Wyton, 6 AEF remained at RAF Benson with parenting being taken over by Oxford University Air Squadron, both units being equipped with Grob Tutor T Mk 1s.

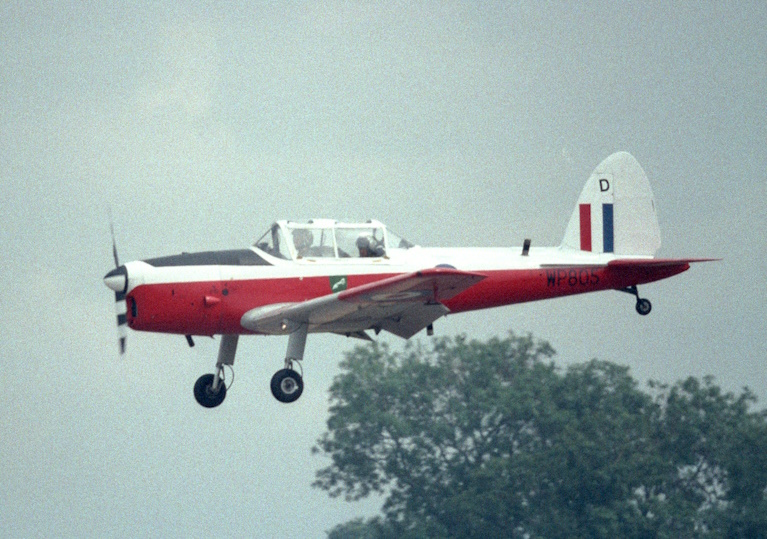
No. 6 Air Experience Flight Chipmunk T.10 WP805 at RAF Fairford 1987

The unit previously operated the de Havilland Canada DHC-1 Chipmunk T.10.

=== June 2009 air collision incident ===
At approximately 2.30pm on Sunday, 14 June 2009, an RAF Grob Tutor (G-BYXR) and a civilian Standard Cirrus glider (G-CKHT) collided above Sutton Courtenay, Oxfordshire.

The two-seater Grob Tutor, took off from RAF Benson in Oxfordshire and was part of No 6 AEF's fleet of planes. Flight Lieutenant Michael Blee was a retired Wing Commander with 38 years' service in the RAF before becoming a Royal Air Force Volunteer Reserve Officer at 6 Air Experience Flight in 2005, where he assumed the rank of Flight Lieutenant. He was killed in the crash along with CCF cadet Nicholas Rice. Nicholas Rice, who was 15 years old, was a student of the Elvian School in Reading, and was from Calcot, Reading, Berkshire. The pilot of the glider survived, having bailed out before his aircraft crashed.

=== Current operations ===
The Air Experience Flight is currently commanded by a Flight Lieutenant on Full-Time Reserve Service and like the University Air Squadron, comes under No. 6 Flying Training School.

== See also ==
- List of mid-air collisions and incidents in the United Kingdom
