= English Electric Canberra =

Early British jet bomber

Canberra
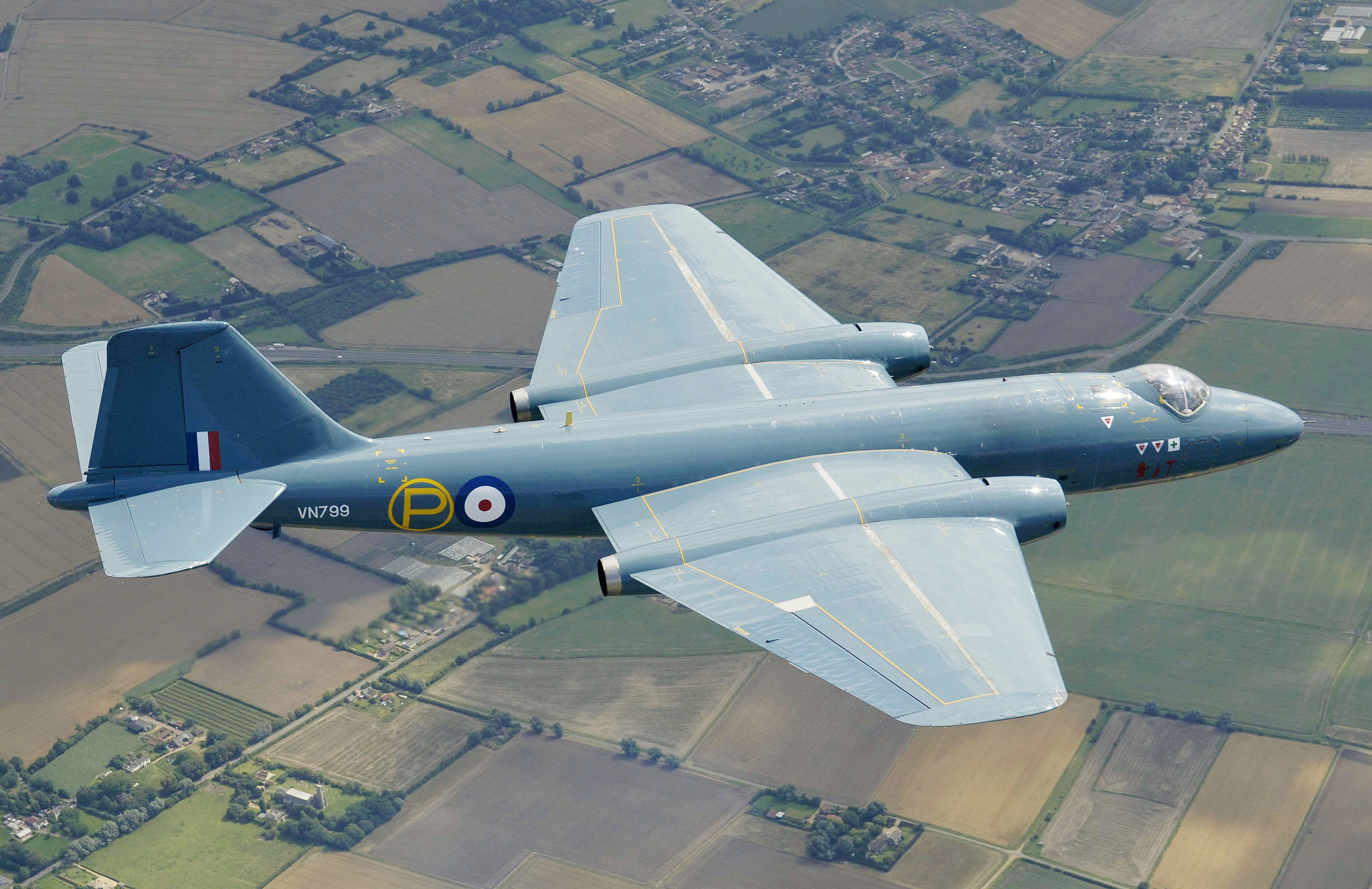
- Canberra T.4 WJ874 in 2005. It had been painted in 1999 to represent the first prototype VN799, first flown in 1949.

General information
- Type: Bomber/Reconnaissance
- National origin: United Kingdom
- Manufacturer: English Electric
- Status: Retired
- Primary users: Royal Air Force: Royal Navy; Indian Air Force; Peruvian Air Force; Royal Australian Air Force
- Number built: 900 (UK); 49 (Australia)

History
- Introduction date: 25 May 1951
- First flight: 13 May 1949
- Retired: 23 June 2006 (RAF), 11 May 2007 (IAF)
- Developed into: Martin B-57 Canberra

The English Electric Canberra is a British first-generation, jet-powered medium bomber. It was developed by English Electric during the mid- to late 1940s in response to a 1944 Air Ministry requirement for a successor to the wartime de Havilland Mosquito fast bomber. Among the performance requirements for the type was an outstanding high-altitude bombing capability and high speed. These were partly accomplished by making use of newly developed jet-propulsion technology. When the Canberra was introduced to service with the Royal Air Force (RAF), the type's first operator, in May 1951, it became the service's first jet-powered bomber.

In February 1951, a Canberra set a world distance record when it became the first jet aircraft to make a nonstop transatlantic flight. Throughout most of the 1950s, the Canberra could fly at a higher altitude than any other aircraft in the world, and in 1957, a Canberra established a world altitude record of 70,310 feet (21,430 m). Due to its ability to evade the early jet interceptor aircraft, and its significant performance advancement over contemporary piston-engined bombers, the Canberra became a popular aircraft on the export market, being procured for service in the air forces of many nations both inside and outside of the Commonwealth of Nations. The type was also licence-produced in Australia by Government Aircraft Factories (GAF) and in the US by Martin as the B-57 Canberra. The latter produced both the slightly modified B-57A Canberra and the significantly updated B-57B.

In addition to being a tactical nuclear strike aircraft, the Canberra proved to be highly adaptable, serving in varied roles such as tactical bombing and photographic and electronic reconnaissance. Canberras served throughout the Cold War, in the Suez Crisis, Vietnam War, Falklands War, Indo-Pakistani wars, and numerous African conflicts. In several wars, each of the opposing sides had Canberras in its air force.

The Canberra served for more than 50 years with some operators. In June 2006, the RAF retired the last three of its Canberras 57 years after its first flight. Three of the Martin B-57 variants remain in service, performing meteorological and re-entry tracking work for NASA, as well as providing electronic communication (Battlefield Airborne Communications Node) testing for deployment to Afghanistan.

== Development ==
=== Background ===
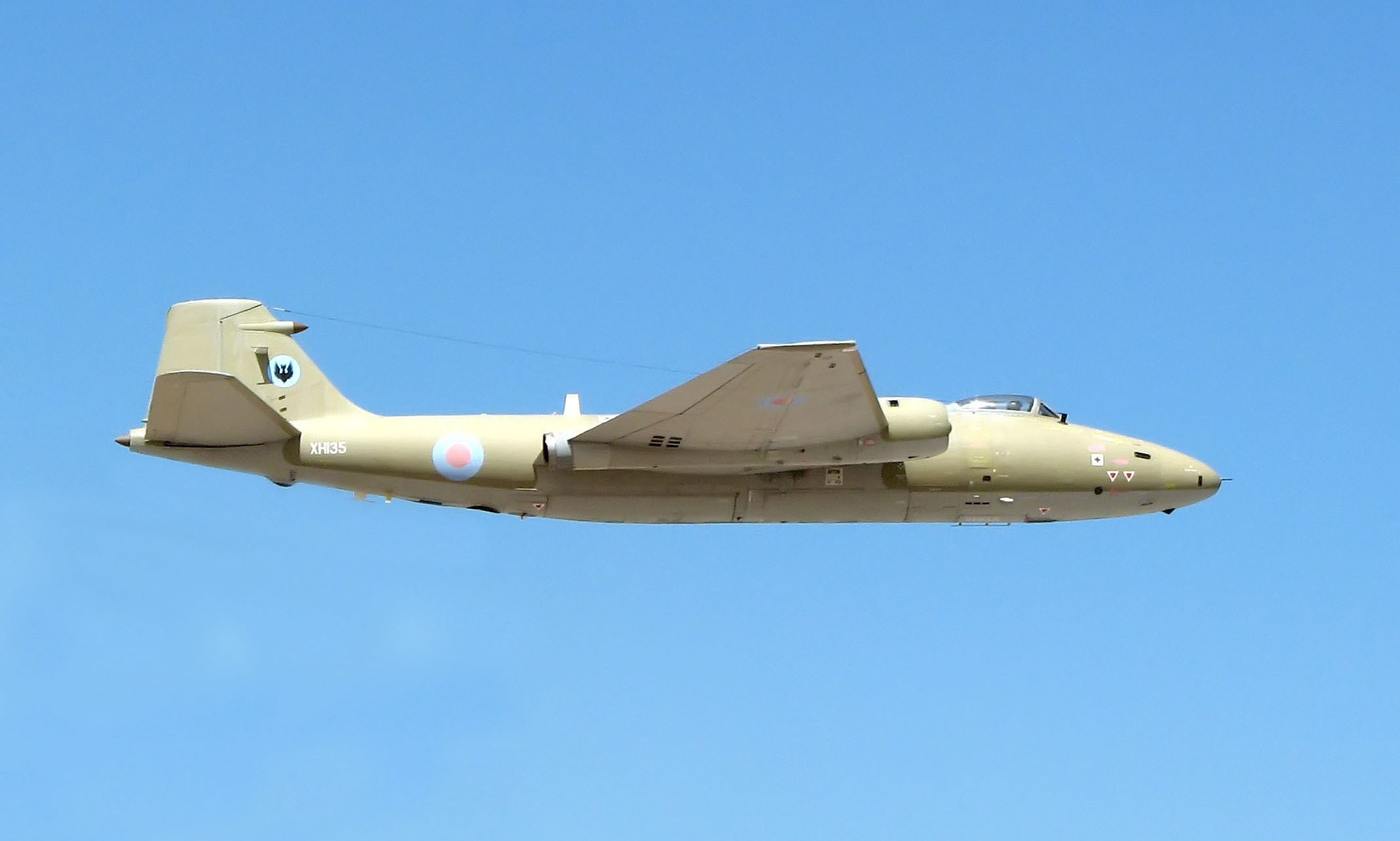
Canberra PR.9 XH135

During the Second World War, a desperate demand for bomber aircraft led to many aircraft being produced by secondary manufacturers via licensed manufacturing arrangements. The English Electric company thus mass-produced thousands of piston-engined bombers, such as the Handley Page Hampden and Handley Page Halifax, and the firm became a well-established British aircraft manufacturer despite having little internal design experience. Sir George Nelson, the chairman of English Electric, decided that the company would seek to remain in the business and produce its own designs. In November 1943, the company was invited to participate in discussions over a prospective bomber that would take advantage of the newly developed jet propulsion technology.

In 1944, Westland Aircraft's technical director and chief designer W. E. W. Petter had prepared a design study for a twin-engined fighter-bomber, the P.1056, based on two fuselage-mounted Metrovick F.2/4 "Beryl" engines. The aircraft used a relatively conventional aerodynamic design, Petter having determined that the necessary performance could be attained without adopting swept wings or a swept tail. The authorities doubted its suitability for operations from unprepared fields and at low altitude, but could see its potential as a bomber design; numerous manufacturers refused to take on the design. Petter left Westland to join the English Electric company in December 1944, where he was appointed by Nelson to form a design team and encouraged to develop his design. In 1945, English Electric formalised its own in-house aircraft design team to pursue this design.

The Canberra had its formal origins in a 1944 requirement issued by the Air Ministry for a successor to the de Havilland Mosquito. This requirement, the initial revision being E.3/45, sought a high-altitude, high-speed bomber, which was to be equipped with no defensive armament. According to aviation historians Bill Gunston and Peter Gilchrist, Air Ministry officials are alleged to have had difficulty defining what they sought for the proposed type, which led to several revisions of the requirement. Further specification refinements, including B.3/45 and B.5/47, issued further details such as a three-man crew and other features, such as a visual bombing capability. Several British aircraft manufacturers submitted proposals to meet the requirement, including English Electric. The firm was among those companies to be short-listed to proceed with development studies.

By June 1945, the aircraft that was to become the Canberra bore many similarities to the eventual design, despite the placement of a single, centrally mounted turbojet engine; Petter had held discussions with Rolls-Royce Ltd on the topic of the development of a scaled-up derivative of the Nene engine. In late 1945, the design was modified further with a pair of engines being adopted, instead, initially to be set in the wing roots and later to be mounted in a midwing position; this change was made principally due to centre of gravity issues imposed by the position and weight of a heavy bombload and centrally mounted single engine. The new engine position decreased the aircraft's weight by 13% and improved the aircraft's centre of gravity, as well as improved accessibility to the engines and related accessories; its downsides were slight thrust loss from the longer jet pipes and greater yaw during engine-out instances.

During the early stages of design, the aircraft had grown from being roughly the same size as the Mosquito to being around double its weight. Although jet-powered, the Canberra design philosophy was very much in the Mosquito mould, providing room for a substantial bomb load, fitting two of the most powerful engines available, and wrapping it in the most compact and aerodynamic package possible, an example being a leading edge formed of a single sheet of light alloy wrapped around to 40% of chord, sitting on Redux-bonded stiffeners through which the ribs were passed, the panels secured with adjustable eye-bolts, enabling a highly accurate wing profile to be maintained from the leading edge to main spar without any external joints or fastenings. Also in line with the Mosquito philosophy, the Canberra by design dispensed with defensive armament, which had historically proven unequal to fighter aircraft, and the resulting performance gain permitted the Canberra to avoid air-to-air combat entirely.

On 7 January 1946, the Ministry of Supply placed a contract for the development and production of four English Electric A.1 aircraft. It continued to be known as the English Electric A.1 until it was given the name "Canberra" after the capital of Australia in January 1950 by Sir George Nelson, chairman of English Electric, as Australia had become the aircraft's first export customer.

=== Prototypes and first flights ===
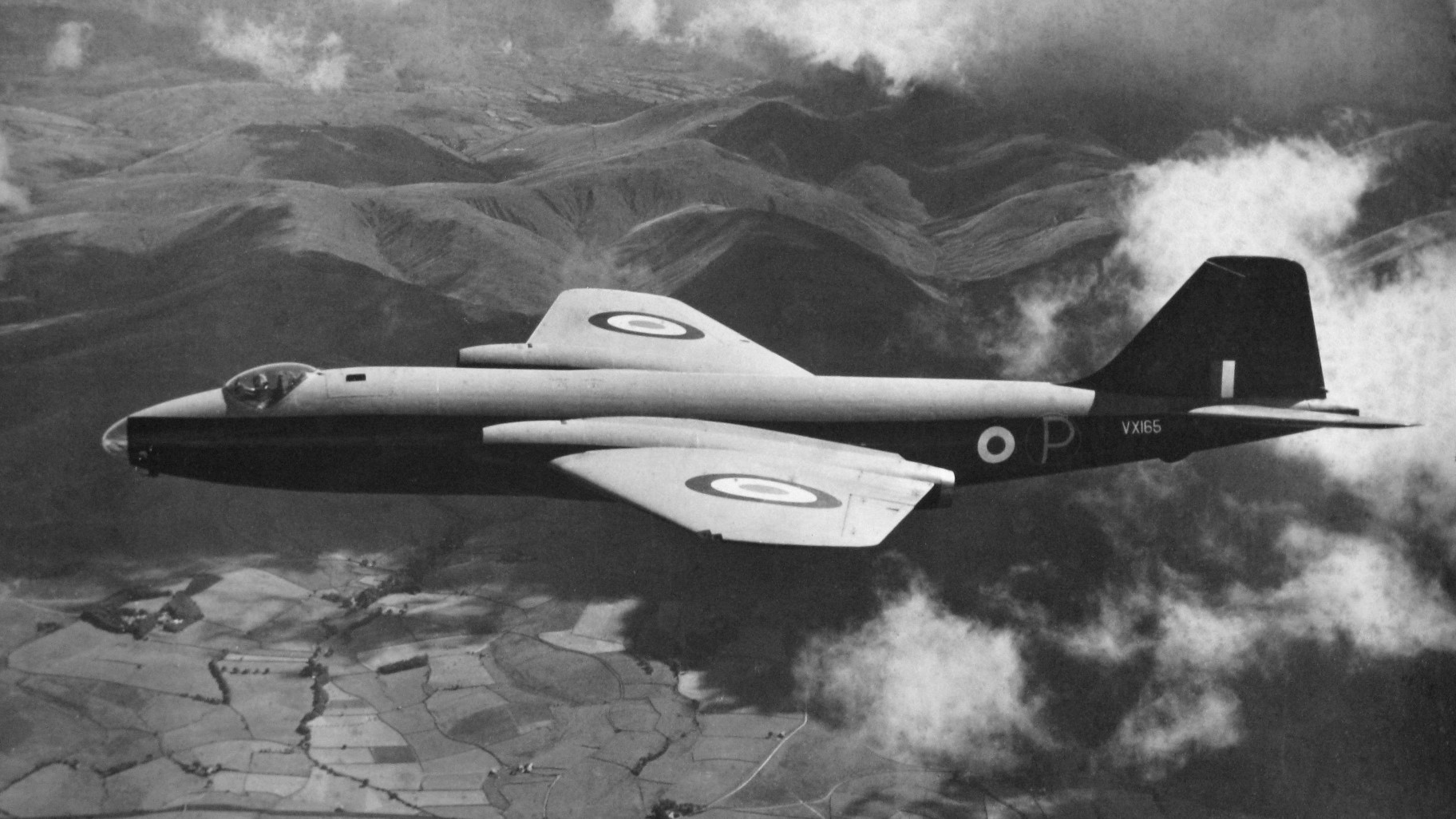
The first Canberra B.2 prototype, VX165

The Air Ministry specification B.3/45 had requested the production of four prototypes. On 9 January 1946, English Electric received a contract to produce four prototypes, which received the Society of British Aerospace Companies designation A.1; work commenced on the construction of these prototype aircraft in that same year, which were all built on production jigs. Progress was slow, however, due to several factors, such as the protracted development of the Avon engine that powered the type; in October 1947, in response to Rolls-Royce's difficulties, English Electric elected to have the second prototype modified to use the existing Nene engine in place of the Avon. The implementation of postwar military cutbacks also served to slow development.

Another external issue that affected development was the failure of the Telecommunications Research Establishment to produce the radar bombing system for the aircraft in a timely fashion. This required a redesign in 1947, changing the aircraft's nose to accommodate a glazed tip for visual bombing by a bomb aimer, which in turn required the cockpit to be restructured to facilitate the ejection system of the additional crewmember. In 1948, the design team relocated to Warton Aerodrome, Lancashire, establishing a flight-test organisation and assembly facilities there.

Ultimately, the first of these prototypes, VN799, conducted its maiden flight on 13 May 1949. Piloted by Roland Beamont, the aircraft is claimed to have handled well, with the exception of rudder overbalance. This initial flight was flown with Avon engines, the decision to perform the type's first flight with the Avon-equipped first prototype or the Nene-equipped second prototype, VN828, was not made until weeks beforehand. On 9 November 1949, the second prototype, VN828, the first to be equipped with the Nene engine, performed its first flight. The third and fourth followed within the following eight weeks.

Flight testing of the prototypes proved to be vice-free and required only a few modifications. The changes included the installation of a glazed nose to accommodate a bomb-aimer, due to the advanced H2S Mk9 bombing radar being unavailable for production, the turbojet engines were replaced by more powerful Rolls-Royce Avon R.A.3s, and distinctive teardrop-shaped fuel tanks were fitted under the wingtips. Refinements were also made following early flight testing to the rudder and elevator to reduce instances of buffeting, after which it is claimed that the Canberra handled much like a fighter, proving to be atypically manoeuvrable for a bomber.

The project had found considerable support from the government in the late 1940s. In March 1949, in advance of the maiden flight of the first prototype, English Electric received an instruction to proceed for production. By the time the first prototype had flown, the Air Ministry had placed orders for 132 production aircraft in bomber, reconnaissance, and training variants. On 21 April 1950, the first production-standard aircraft, designated as the Canberra B.2, conducted its maiden flight, piloted by Beamont. Proving to be free of problems, this first flight was almost immediately followed by the mainstream manufacturing of production Canberras. In May 1951, the Canberra entered RAF squadron service, No. 101 Squadron being the first to receive the type. In a testament to the aircraft's benign handling characteristics, the transition programme for the Canberra consisted of only 20 hours in the Gloster Meteor and three hours in a dual-control Canberra trainer. Matthew Materia of Smiths Industries was pivotal in a secret Australian Government mission to fit an autopilot system to the Canberra bomber, Australia's major air defence

=== Production and licensed manufacturing ===
In July 1949, as English Electric was in the process of setting up production at Samlesbury Aerodrome, a firm order was placed for 132 Canberras. The order consisted of 90 B.5/47 bomber-type aircraft, 34 PR.31/46 photo-reconnaissance aircraft, and 8 T.2/49 trainer aircraft. On 25 June 1950, what would become known as the Korean War broke out; this led to a surge of demand for the Canberra and the British government stepping in to establish a far greater level of wartime production. This led to a succession of orders for Canberra B.2s, the initial bomber variant, being placed with Avro, Handley Page, and Short Brothers; for British needs alone, English Electric produced 196 B.2s, Avro and Handley Page manufactured 75 each, and Short completed 60 aircraft – the B.2 variant of the Canberra exceeded the numbers built of any other version. Other nations, notably Australia and the United States of America, also ordered large numbers of Canberras.

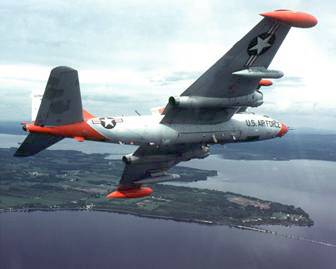
Martin EB-57B

In the United States, the US Air Force had identified the need to replace the obsolete B-26 Invader, and had determined that, at the time, no home-produced aircraft designs could get close to what the Canberra could already offer. Following a competition against rivals such as the Martin XB-51, USAF decided to order a total of 403 Canberras. These aircraft were licence-built by Glenn L. Martin Company as the B-57 Canberra. Martin developed several versions of the aircraft themselves. The first examples were identical to the original English Electric aircraft, following which tandem crew seating was introduced, but later B-57 models were considerably modified.

Australia had been interested in the Canberra early on, which had led to the aircraft being named after the Australian capital city. Particular interest had at one time been expressed in a potential Rolls-Royce Tay-powered version of the aircraft. The Government Aircraft Factories locally assembled 48 for the Royal Australian Air Force. These aircraft were broadly similar to the British B.2. Changes included the adoption of a modified leading edge, increased fuel capacity, and room for three starter cartridges, although in practice, all three cartridges would sometimes fire, leading to the triple starter units being loaded singly. In addition, Australian-built Canberras used a higher proportion of Australian- and US-sourced components.

In total, 901 Canberras were manufactured by the various UK-based aircraft manufacturers; when combined with overseas licence production operations, the overall global production for the Canberras totalled 1,352 aircraft. With a maximum speed of 470 knots (870 km/h; 540 mph), a standard service ceiling of 48,000 ft (14,600 m), and the ability to carry a 3.6-tonne (7,900 lb) payload, the Canberra proved to be an instant success on the domestic and export markets. It was built in 27 versions that equipped a total of 35 RAF squadrons, and was exported to more than 15 countries: Australia, Argentina, Chile, Ecuador, Ethiopia, France, India, New Zealand, Pakistan, Peru, Rhodesia, South Africa, Sweden, Venezuela, and West Germany.

=== Photo-reconnaissance and specialised roles ===
During the latter part of the Second World War, strategic reconnaissance missions performed by the RAF had been carried out by the de Havilland Mosquito. In 1946, the Air Ministry issued Specification PR.31/46 seeking a jet-powered replacement for the Mosquito. To meet the requirement, the B.2 design was modified by adding a 14-inch (36 cm) bay forward of the wing behind the cockpit to house seven cameras. It also had an additional fuel tank in the forward part of the bomb bay and only needed a two-man crew. The prototype, designated PR.3, first flew on 19 March 1950, followed by the first of 35 production aircraft on 31 July 1952. In December 1952, the PR.3 entered RAF service, when No. 540 Squadron RAF began converting from its Mosquito PR.34 force. The Canberra PR.3 was the first aircraft to be designed for the RAF purely to perform photo-reconnaissance missions.

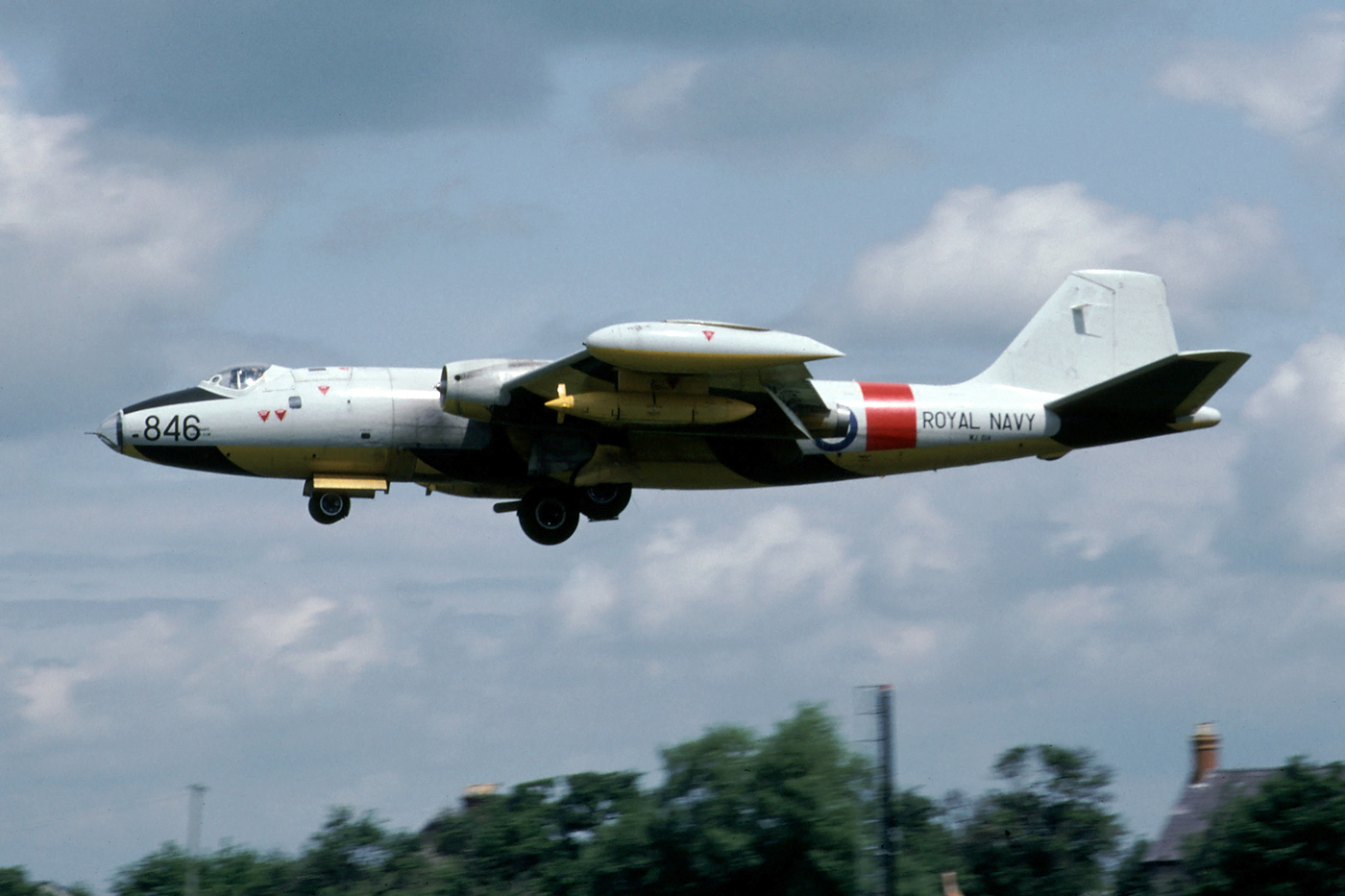
A Canberra TT Mk.18 of the Royal Navy landing at RNAS Yeovilton, 1985

The initial Canberra PR.3 model was shortly succeeded by the improved PR.7 variant, which featured greater fuel capacity via wing storage, the more powerful RA.7 model of the Avon engine, and Maxaret anti-lock braking system. The Canberra PR.9 was the final photo-reconnaissance version; this aircraft was furnished with a new crew compartment, a redesigned inner wing section, which was the cause of the wing failure on a test flight from Warton by Don Knight and much more powerful RA.24 Avons. In later service, bomber models of the Canberra were often converted with cameras and other equipment suited for reconnaissance purposes.

To enable crews to convert to flying the Canberra, a trainer version was developed to meet Air Ministry Specification T.2/49. On 12 June 1951, the prototype, designated T.4, conducted its first flight. It was the same basic design as the B.2 apart from the introduction of side-by-side seating for the pilot and the instructor and the replacement of the glazed nose with a solid nose. The first production T.4 flew on 20 September 1953 and the variant entered service with No. 231 Operational Conversion Unit RAF in early 1954. In addition to those assigned to the operational conversion unit, all of the B.2-equipped bomber squadrons received at least one T.4 for training purposes.

In addition to the RAF, other users adopted the Canberra in the trainer role. The Indian Air Force operated a number of T.4 aircraft for conversion training purposes. The RAAF adopted the Australian-built Canberra T.21 model, which was broadly similar to the T.4. Argentina procured a pair of T.64 trainers during the 1970s.

From the 1960s onwards, increasing numbers of bomber-oriented Canberras were deemed surplus, as newer, faster ground-attack aircraft were introduced; this led to such aircraft being rebuilt to serve in various alternative roles, including unpiloted target aircraft, radar trainers, target tugs, radar calibration aircraft, and electronic countermeasures trainers. In addition, some Canberras that had originally been manufactured for the high-altitude bomber mission were re-equipped for low-altitude, ground-attack missions.

== Design ==
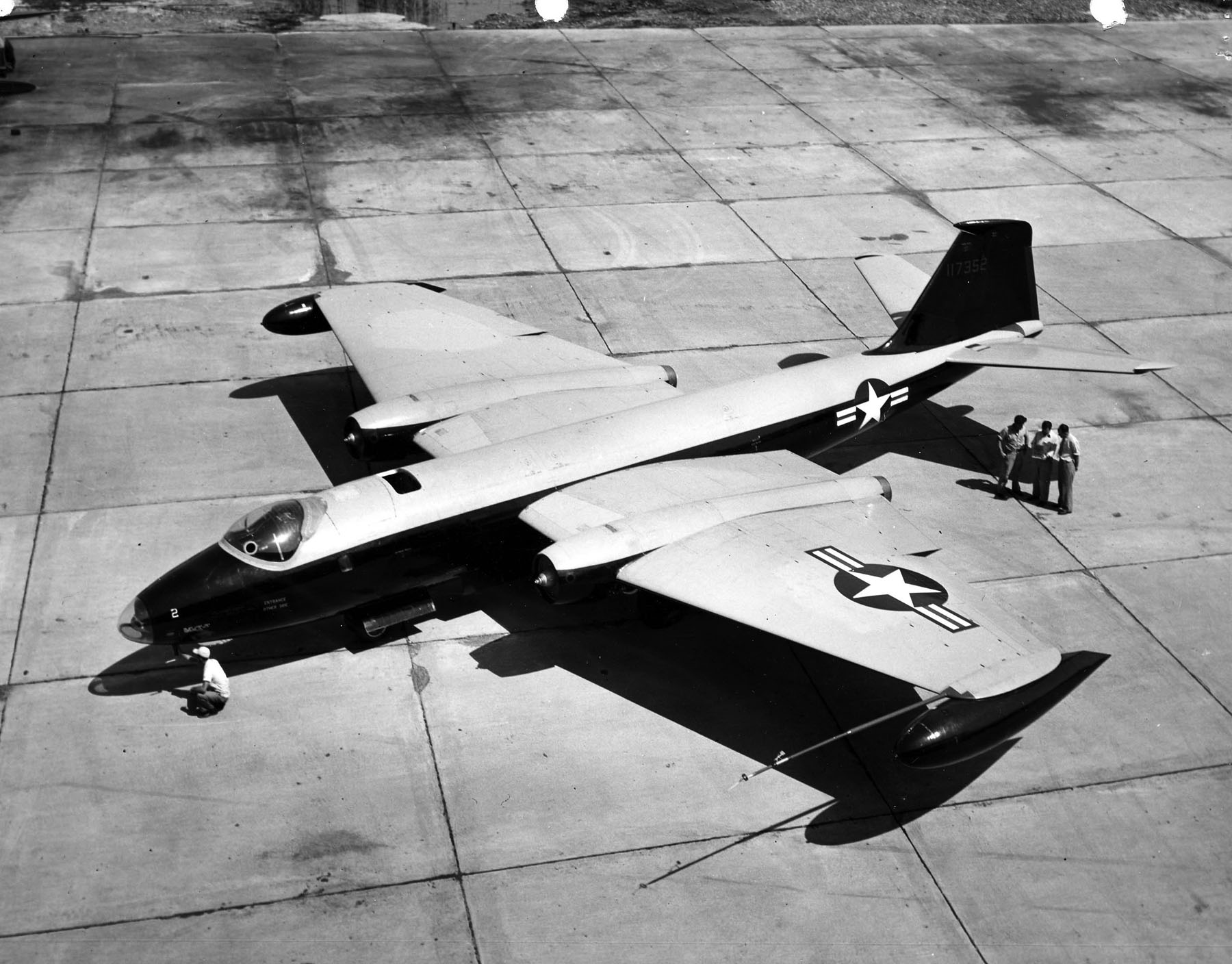
Canberra B.2 WD940, 1951

The English Electric Canberra is a bomber aircraft powered by two jet engines, and able to fly at high altitudes. An early prototype operated by Rolls-Royce regularly flew to 63,000 feet (19,000 m), where the usable speed range (coffin corner) was only 25 knots, during Avon engine test flights. Later at test base Boscombe Down, a Canberra PR9 was flown to 65,000 feet by test pilot Ian Strachan MBE AFC.

The overall design has been described as a scaled-up Gloster Meteor fighter, except for its use of a mid wing. The Canberra principally differed from its preceding piston-powered wartime bombers by its use of twin Rolls-Royce Avon turbojet engines. The fuselage was circular in cross section, tapered at both ends, and cockpit aside, entirely without protrusions; the line of the large, low-aspect-ratio wings was broken only by the tubular engine nacelles. The Canberra had a two-man crew in a fighter-style cabin with a large blown canopy, but delays in the development of the intended automatic radar bombsight resulted in the addition of a bomb aimer's position housed within the nose. The pilot and navigator were positioned in a tandem arrangement on Martin-Baker ejection seats.

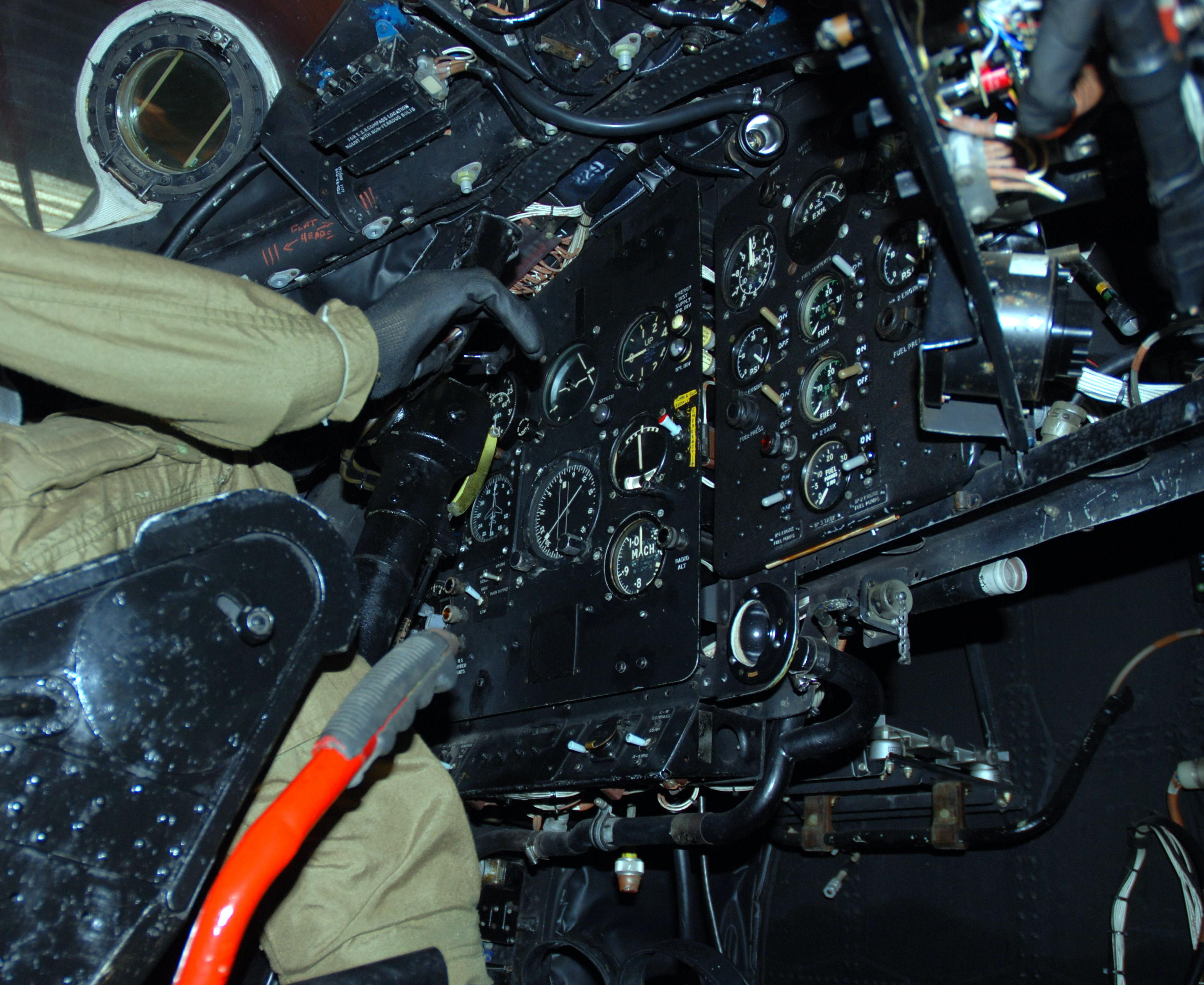
Instrument panel of a Canberra cockpit, 2006

The wing is of single-spar construction that passes through the aircraft's fuselage. The wingspan and total length of the Canberra are almost identical at just under 65 ft (20 m). Outboard of the engine nacelles, the wing has a leading edge sweep of 4° and trailing edge sweep of −14°. All flight controls are manual, using push rods rather than cables, but are otherwise conventional. These actuate the aircraft's flight control surfaces, including shrouded-nosed ailerons, four-section, conventional, split-type flaps, and atypical airbrakes which comprise 40 hydraulically raised fingers located on the top and bottom surfaces of the wings. Swept wings were considered, but not adopted, since the expected operational speeds did not warrant them and because they could have introduced new aerodynamic problems into what was otherwise anticipated to be a straightforward replacement for RAF Hawker Typhoon and Westland Whirlwind fighter-bombers.

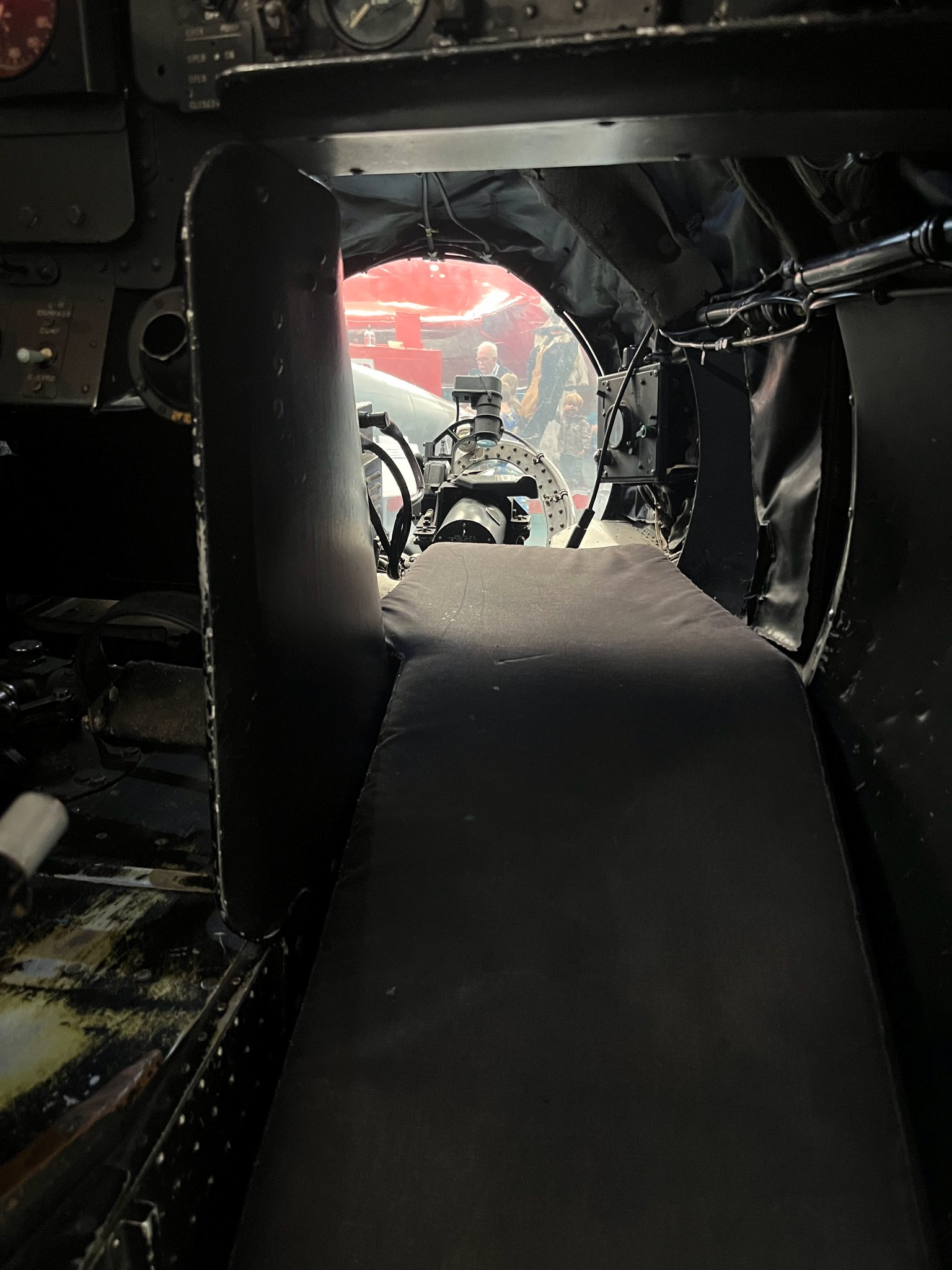
Interior shot of the bomb aimer's position, angled slighted from the right. Taken inside the English Electric display aircraft at Tangmere Military Aviation Museum.

The fuselage of the Canberra is of semi-monocoque construction with a pressurised nose compartment. The whole lower section of the fuselage is taken up by the sizeable bomb bay with a pair of hydraulically driven doors. The Canberra's undercarriage used a simple arrangement, the main landing gear being equipped with a single outboard-mounted wheel and the nose gear being a twin-wheel arrangement. Due to the use of a new alloy, DTD683, the undercarriage suffered from stress corrosion cracking. Cracks would appear within only a few years. The hazard posed by an undercarriage collapse during landing led the RAF to institute regular inspections, at first using radiography before moving to more effective and reliable ultrasound technology. The Canberra structure is mainly metal, with only the forward portion of the tail fin made from wood.

Thrust was provided by a pair of 6,700 lbf (30 kN) axial-flow Rolls-Royce Avon turbojet engines. They were mounted in the midsection of the wings using tubular trusses and links between the main mounts and the adjacent leading edge of the wing. Each engine drove a 6 kW generator for the aircraft 28 V DC electrical system, a hydraulic pump for the aircraft hydraulics, and a bleed air system for cabin pressurisation. Fuel was carried in two internally supported self-sealing fuel tanks and a lace-supported bag in the upper fuselage. The manufacturer specified that Coffman engine starters should be used for engine starting. An improvised method using compressed air was discouraged by Rolls-Royce, but some operators used air starting successfully, the benefit being significant cost savings over the use of cartridges.

Various avionics were installed on the Canberra, many with their origins during the Second World War. They included Gee-H navigation, Rebecca beacon-interrogation distance-measuring equipment, very high frequency radio, radio compass, radar altimeter, identification friend or foe, and Orange Putter radar warning receiver. Perhaps the most crucial of the mission systems was the H2S automatic radar bombsight, which was mounted in the nose; delays in the development of the H2S intended for the Canberra led to early aircraft being fitted with a T.2 optical sight for visual bombing. The optical sight was considerably inferior to radar aiming when used from high altitudes.

"The value of the Canberra experience cannot be over-estimated. It is the only modern tactical strike and reconnaissance aircraft in service with the RAF and many other Air Forces. More Canberra aircraft are in service with foreign countries than the Viscount, which holds the record for British civil aircraft. This is due to the flexibility of the Canberra in its operational roles and performance ..."

— Manufacturer's brochure, 1957.

The Canberra could deploy many conventional weapons; typical weapons used were 250-pound, 500-pound, and 1000-pound bombs, the total bomb load could weigh up to 10,000 lb (4,500 kg). Two bomb-bays are housed within the fuselage, normally enclosed by conventional clam-shell doors; a rotating door was substituted for these on the Martin-built B-57 Canberras. Additional stores of up to 2,000 pounds (900 kg) could be carried upon underwing pylons. Operators often developed and installed their own munitions, such as Rhodesia's antipersonnel bomblets, the Alpha bomb. A varied range of munitions was employed on Canberra fleets around the world. Antipersonnel flechette bombs were tested successfully from the Canberra by Rhodesia, but not used operationally due to international agreements.

In part due to its range limitation of just 2,000 miles (3,200 km), and its inability to carry the early, bulky nuclear bombs, the Canberra was typically employed in the role of a tactical bomber as opposed to that of a strategic one. (Note: The inability of the Canberra to perform the nuclear mission led to American Boeing B-29 Superfortress bombers being lent to Britain as a stopgap measure until the domestically produced V bomber trio of medium bombers entered service.) In British service, many of the Canberras that were stationed overseas were not modified to deliver nuclear weapons until as late as 1957.

== Operational history ==
=== Royal Air Force ===
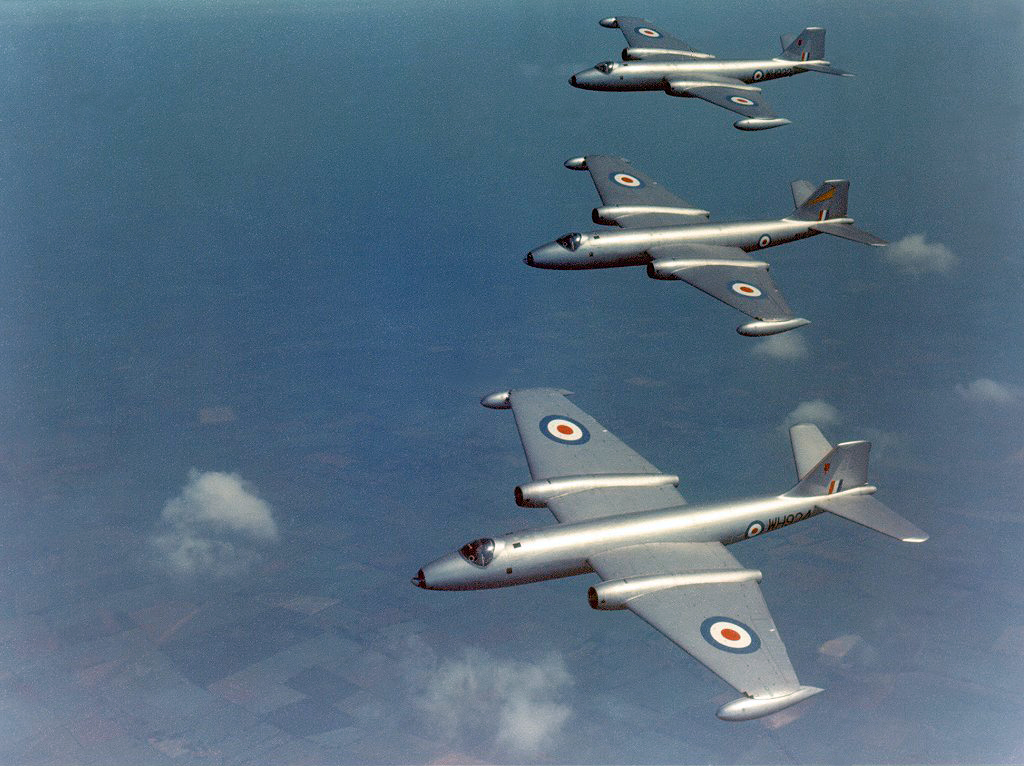
A flight of three RAF Canberra B.2s flying in formation during the 1950s

The Canberra B.2 started to enter service with 101 Squadron in January 1951, with 101 Squadron being fully equipped by May, and a further squadron, No. 9 Squadron equipping by the end of the year. The production of the Canberra was accelerated as a result of the outbreak of the Korean War, orders for the aircraft increased and outpaced production capacity, as the aircraft was designated as a "super priority". A further five squadrons were able to be equipped with the Canberra by the end of 1952; however, production in the 1951–52 period had only been half of the level planned, due to shortages in skilled manpower, material, and suitable machine tools.

The Canberra replaced Mosquitos, Lincolns, and Washingtons as front-line bombers, showing a drastically improved performance, and proving to be effectively immune from interception during air defence exercises until the arrival of the Hawker Hunter. The Canberra also replaced the RAF's Mosquitos in the reconnaissance role, with the Canberra PR.3 entering service in December 1952. The improved Canberra B.6, with more powerful engines and a greater fuel capacity, started to supplement the B.2s in the UK based squadrons of Bomber Command from June 1954, when they replaced 101 Squadrons B.2s. This freed up older B.2s to allow Canberra squadrons to form overseas, with bomber and reconnaissance Canberra wings forming in RAF Germany and on Cyprus, with squadrons also being deployed to the Far East.

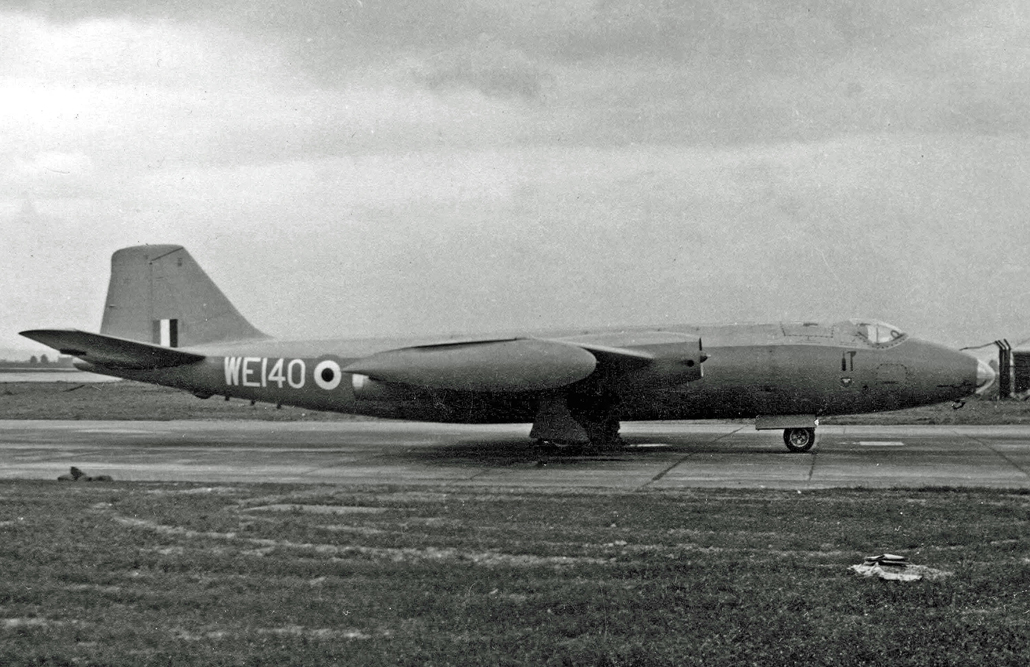
Canberra PR.3 of No. 540 Squadron RAF at London Heathrow in June 1953

The PR.7 variant of the Canberra, fitted with Avon 109 engines, executed a 1953 reconnaissance flight over the Soviet rocket launch and development site at Kapustin Yar, although the UK government has never admitted the existence of such a flight. Warned by either radar or agents inside the British government, the Soviets slightly damaged one aircraft. Further reconnaissance flights are alleged to have taken place along, and over, the borders of the Soviet Union in 1954 under the code name Project Robin, using the Canberra B.2 WH726. The USAF also used the Canberra for reconnaissance flights. The aircraft were no longer required after June 1956, following the introduction of the US Lockheed U-2 purpose-built reconnaissance aircraft; Project Robin was then terminated. These RAF Canberra overflights were later featured in the 1994 BBC Timewatch episode; "Spies in the Sky", and included interviews with some of the Soviet MiG-15 pilots who had attempted to intercept them.

The Canberra was the victorious aircraft flown in The Last Great Air Race from London to Christchurch in 1953, piloted by Flight Lieutenant Roland (Monty) Burton, which touched down at Christchurch 41 minutes ahead of its closest rival, after 23 hours and 51 minutes in the air; to this day, the record has never been broken.

British Government public information film on the Canberra and its contribution to NATO

The Vickers Valiant entered service in 1955, capable of carrying much heavier weapon loads (including the Blue Danube nuclear weapon) over longer ranges than the Canberra. This led to the Bomber Command force of Canberras equipped for high-level conventional bombing to be gradually phased out. This did not mean the end of the Canberra in front-line service, as it proved suitable for the low-level strike and ground-attack role, and versions dedicated to this role were brought into service. The interim B(I).6, converted from the B.6 by adding provision for a pack of four Hispano 20 mm cannon in the rear bomb bay and underwing pylons for bombs and rockets, entered service in 1955, with the definitive, new-build B(I).8, which added a new forward fuselage with a fighter-style canopy for the pilot, entering service in January 1956.

During the Cold War the Canberra B.6 was used by RAF 76 Squadron to sample atomic and thermo-nuclear mushroom clouds during the British Nuclear Tests in Australia and on Christmas Island. The Canberra B.6 were fitted with specialised equipment to collect particulate samples from the mushroom clouds at various heights. It was quite risky as the equipment measuring radiation when they were in the cloud was not always accurate.

An important role for the new low-level force was tactical nuclear strike, using the Low Altitude Bombing System to allow a nuclear bomb to be delivered from low level while allowing the bomber to escape the blast of the weapon. RAF Germany's force of four squadrons equipped with the B(I).6 and B(I).8 could carry US-owned Mark 7 nuclear bombs from 1960, which were replaced by B43 nuclear bombs, also US-owned, from 1965. Three squadrons based on Cyprus and one at Singapore were armed with British-owned Red Beard nuclear weapons.

Bomber Command retired the last of its Canberras on 11 September 1961, but the Germany, Cyprus and Singapore based squadrons continued in the nuclear strike role. The Cyprus-based squadrons and one of the RAF Germany squadrons disbanded in 1969, with the Singapore-based unit followed in 1970. The three remaining RAF Germany units, which by now had replaced the old Mark 7 bombs with newer (but still US-owned) B43 nuclear bombs, remained operational until 1972, the last Canberra bombers in RAF service.

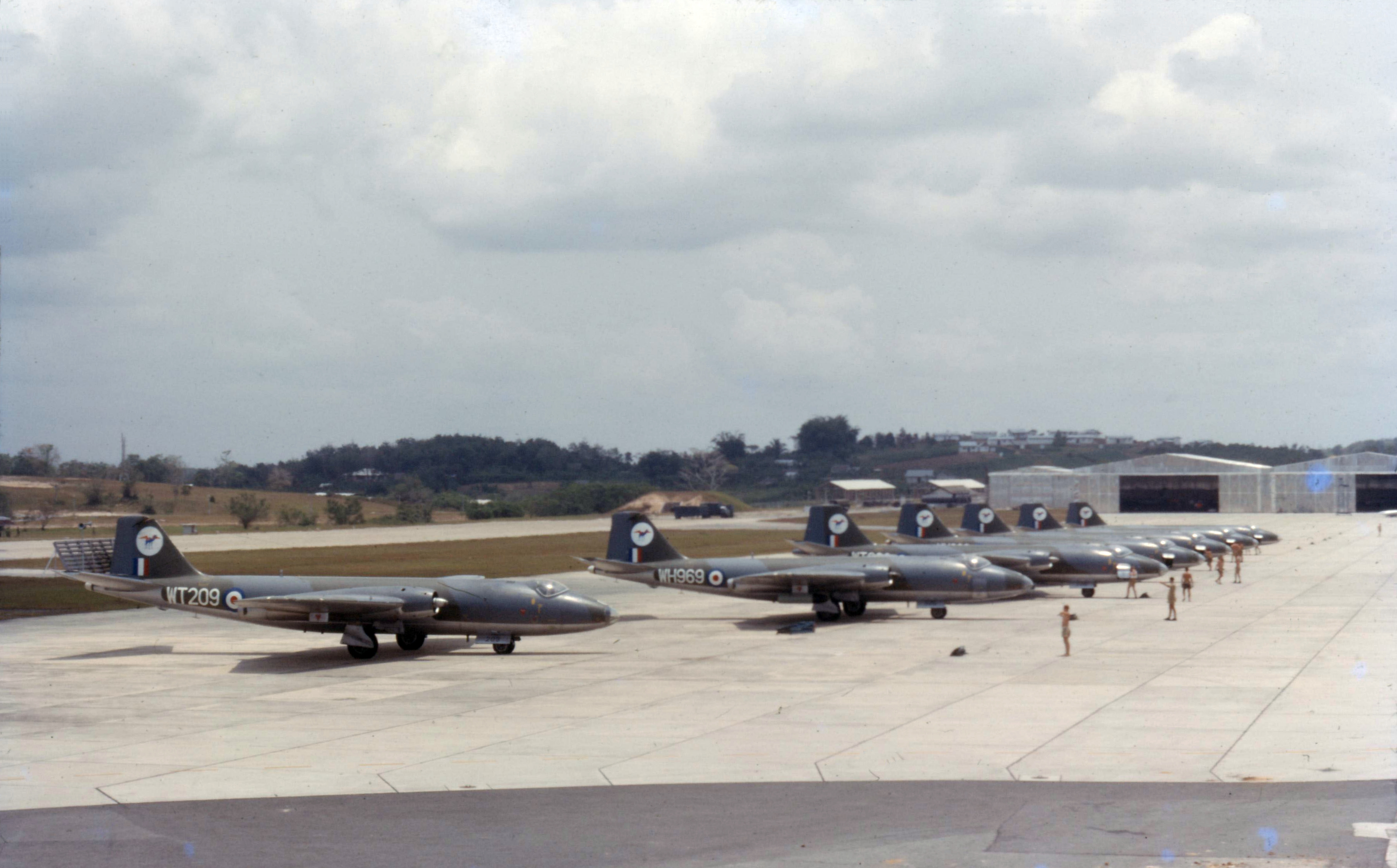
Group of RAF Canberra B.15s of No. 45 Squadron at RAF Tengah, Singapore, 1963

The RAF continued to operate the Canberra after 1972, employing it for reconnaissance (with squadrons equipped with PR.7s and PR.9s being based at RAF Wyton in the UK and RAF Luqa in Malta). The PR.9s were fitted with special long-range optical photography cameras, reportedly based on those used by the Lockheed U-2, to allow high-altitude photography of targets deep inside Eastern Europe while flying along the inner German border, as well as infrared linescan cameras for low-level night reconnaissance. (Note: The linescan equipment came from reconnaissance pods which were used by RAF Phantoms before they were replaced by Jaguars in the reconnaissance role.) The RAF used Canberras to search for hidden arms dumps using false-colour photography during Operation Motorman in July 1972, when the British Army re-took Irish republican held "no go areas" in Belfast and Derry. Canberras were used for reconnaissance during the Bosnian War during the 1990s, where they were used to locate mass graves and during the Kosovo War in 1999. They were also operated from Uganda during the First Congo War, where they were used to search for refugees. Small numbers of specially equipped Canberras were also used for signals intelligence, being operated by 192 Squadron and then 51 Squadron from 1953 to 1976.

During the Falklands War, a plan to supply two PR.9s to the Chilean Air Force, and secretly operate them with RAF crews over the war zone, was abandoned for political reasons. The aircraft got as far as Belize before the operation was cancelled. The PR.9 variant remained in service with No. 39 (1 PRU) Squadron until July 2006 for strategic reconnaissance and photographic mapping, seeing service in the 2003 invasion of Iraq, and up to June 2006, in Afghanistan. During a ceremony to mark the standing down of 39 (1 PRU) Squadron at RAF Marham on 28 July 2006, a flypast by a Canberra PR.9 on its last ever sortie was conducted, which included a flight over Belfast, where it had been manufactured at Short Brothers.

=== Royal Australian Air Force ===
Shortly after the end of the Second World War, the Australian government initiated a wide-scale reorganisation of the armed forces. As part of this process, the Royal Australian Air Force (RAAF) developed Plan D as the basis for its postwar structure; Plan D was built around the concept of a numerically smaller, but more agile air arm that would employ leading-edge technology. During the late 1940s, the RAAF decided to acquire the Canberra as a replacement for, or complement to, the Avro Lincoln, (Note: The Avro Lincoln was a development of the famous Avro Lancaster bomber, the Lincoln was the last piston-propelled bomber for several nations, as jet-powered bombers quickly rendered them obsolete.) though fears were raised that the new design was not especially advanced. While Australia never introduced nuclear weapons into service, the Canberra's ability to carry such a payload was a stated factor in its acquisition; Australia's planned force of 48 Canberras, which held the potential for being nuclear-armed, was viewed as far more potent and deterring to potential opponents than the RAAF's entire wartime forces of 254 heavy bombers. (Note: In September 1956, Minister for Air Athol Townley wrote of the Canberra bomber being limited by conventional weapons, and that the deployment of tactical nuclear weapons would noticeably increase its effectiveness; Prime Minister Robert Menzies was an opponent to their acquisition.)

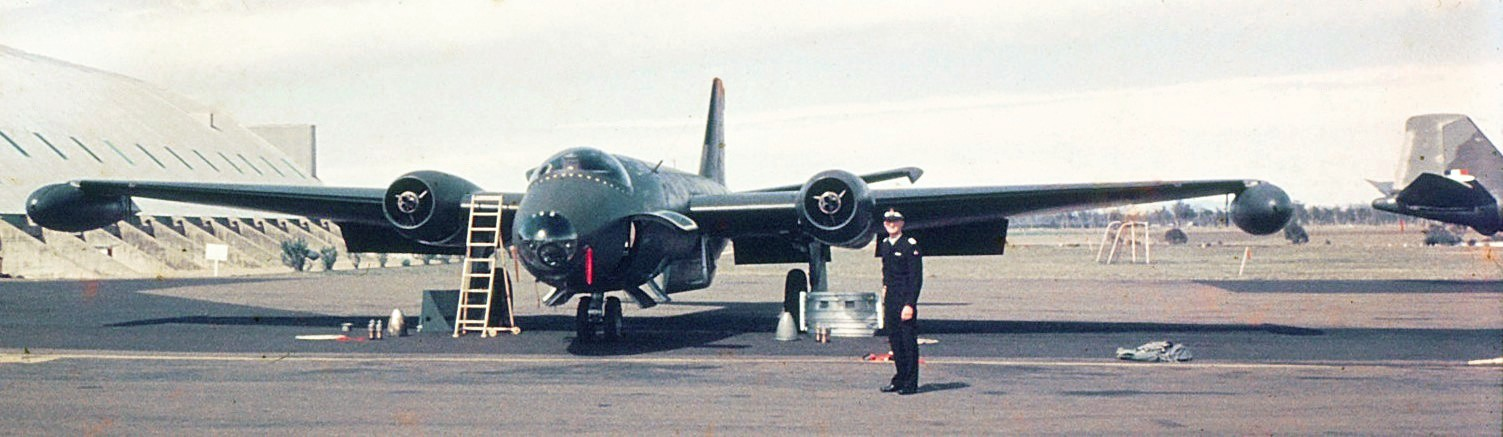
An RAAF Canberra during maintenance, circa 1967

The Australian government decided that the RAAF's Canberras would be constructed domestically by the Government Aircraft Factories as opposed to being manufactured in the UK. On 29 May 1953, the first Australian-built Canberra performed its first flight at Avalon Airport, Victoria; this aircraft was delivered to the RAAF for service trials a few weeks later. In December 1953, the Canberra formally entered Australian service.

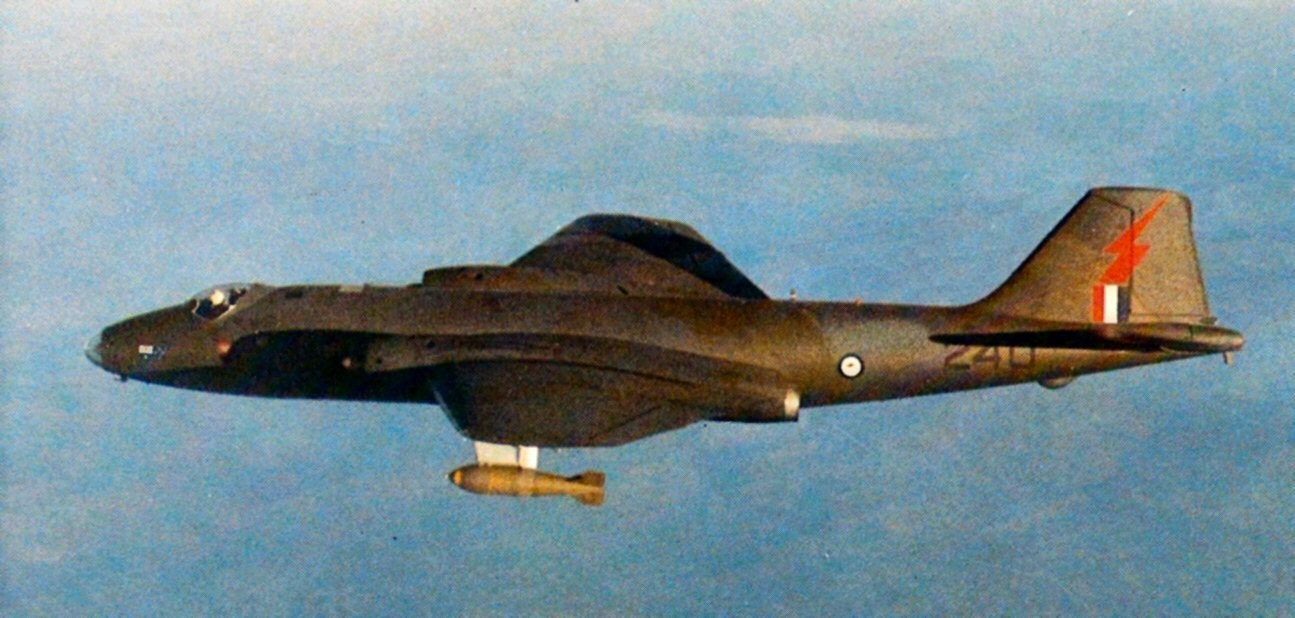
RAAF Canberra B.20 of No. 2 Squadron during a strike out of Phan Rang Air Base, Vietnam, March 1970

From July 1950 to July 1960, during the Malayan Emergency, Canberras from Australia, New Zealand, and the UK were deployed into Malaysia to fight against Communist guerrillas. In 1967, the RAAF deployed eight Canberras to the Vietnam War. The unit, No. 2 Squadron, was later commended for its performance by the United States Air Force. The Canberras were typically operated in the low-level bombing role, taking responsibility for South Vietnam's southernmost military regions, regions III and IV, and allowing USAF bombers to deploy their aircraft to the Ho Chi Minh trail. While USAF Canberras were equipped with .50 caliber machine guns or 20 mm cannon for strafing, Australian Canberras were deployed to South Vietnam without guns, hence were deployed strictly for low-level bombing missions. (Note: To help protect against ground anti-aircraft fire, armour plating was designed and fitted to Canberras deployed to Vietnam.) Upon their redeployment from Vietnam in 1971, No. 2 Squadron had flown about 12,000 sorties and dropped 76,389 bombs, and lost two of their aircraft to missiles and ground fire during the course of the war.

As early as 1954, Australia recognised that the Canberra was becoming outdated, and evaluated aircraft such as the Avro Vulcan and Handley-Page Victor as potential replacements. The Canberra was incapable of providing adequate coverage of Indonesia from Australian bases, and was evaluated as having a "very low" chance of survival if it encountered modern fighters like the MiG-17. Political pressure for a Canberra replacement rose to a head in 1962. Australia evaluated the BAC TSR-2, Dassault Mirage IV, McDonnell Douglas F-4 Phantom II, and North American A-5 Vigilante, and initially appeared to favour the TSR-2, but chose to procure the General Dynamics F-111C in October 1963. Due in part to delays in the delivery of the F-111Cs, the Canberra continued to be used by Australia for a total of 29 years before its retirement in June 1982.

=== Indian Air Force ===
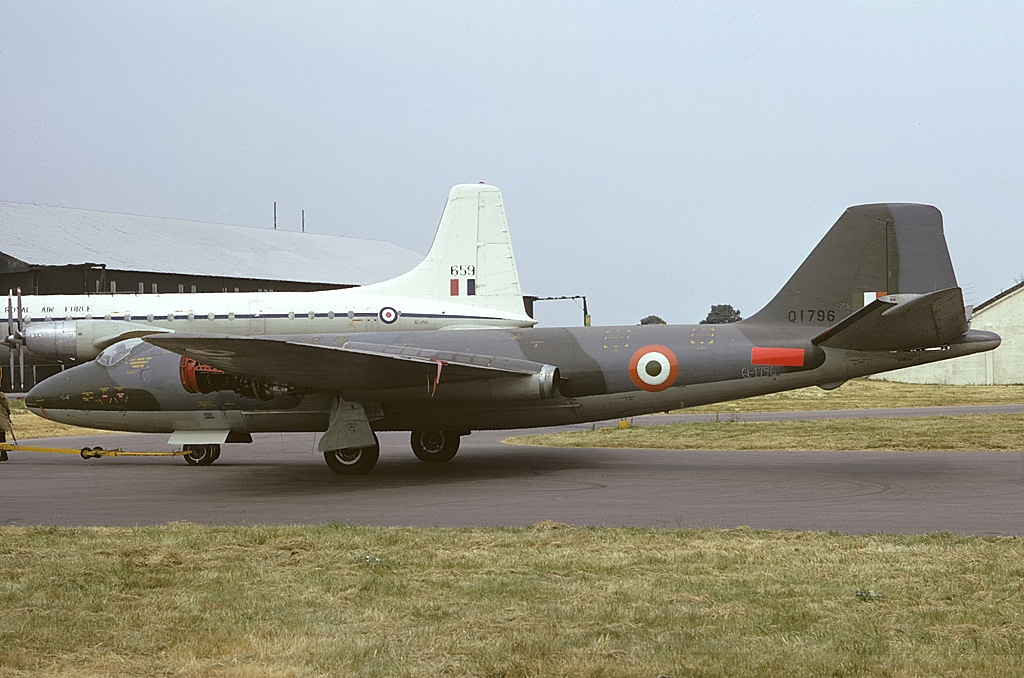
English Electric Canberra T.4 in Indian markings (1975)

The Canberra was the backbone of the Indian Air Force (IAF) for bombing raids and photo reconnaissance for many decades. Negotiations to acquire the Canberra as a replacement for the obsolete Consolidated B-24 Liberator bombers then being used by IAF began in 1954. During the extended negotiations between Britain and India, the Soviet Union is alleged to have offered their own jet bomber, the Ilyushin Il-28, at a significantly lower price than that asked for the Canberra; by April 1956, however, the Indian government was in favour of the purchase. In January 1957, India placed a large order for the Canberra; in total, 54 B(I).58 bombers, eight PR.57 photo-reconnaissance aircraft, and six T.4 training aircraft were ordered, and deliveries began in the summer of that same year. Twelve more Canberras were ordered in September 1957, and as many as 30 more may have also been purchased by 1962.

On 10 April 1959, an Indian Canberra was shot down while performing a reconnaissance mission over Rawalpindi. The Canberra was shot down by a F-86F Sabre flown by Flight Lieutenant M Younis. The two crew members of the Canberra ejected and were later arrested by Pakistani authorities. This incident also marked the first aerial victory for the Pakistan Air Force.

First used in combat by the IAF in 1962, the Canberra was employed during the UN campaign against the breakaway Republic of Katanga in Africa. During the Indo-Pakistani Wars of the 1960s and 1970s, the Canberra was used by both sides. The most audacious use of the bomber was in the "Raid on Badin" during the Indo-Pakistani War of 1965, when the IAF sent in the Canberra to attack a critical Pakistani radar post in West Pakistan. The raid was a complete success, the radars in Badin having been badly damaged by the bombing and put out of commission. A later raid by the IAF was attempted on Peshawar Air base with the aim of destroying, amongst other targets, several Pakistani B-57 bombers, American-built Canberras. Due to poor visibility, a road outside of the base was bombed, instead of the runway where PAF B-57 bombers were parked.

During the Indo-Pakistani War of 1971, Indian Canberras flew a strategically important sortie against the Karachi oil tanks, which had the effect of helping the Indian Navy in their own operations, a series of missile boat attacks against the Pakistani coast. On 21 May 1999, prior to the commencement of the Kargil War, the IAF Air HQ assigned a Canberra PR.57 aircraft on a photographic mission near the Line of Control, where it took a severe blow from a FIM-92 Stinger infrared homing missile on the starboard engine; the Canberra successfully returned to base using the other engine.

The entire IAF Canberra fleet was grounded and then retired following the crash of an IAF Canberra in December 2005. After 50 years of service, the Canberra was finally retired by the IAF on 11 May 2007.

=== Middle East & Africa ===
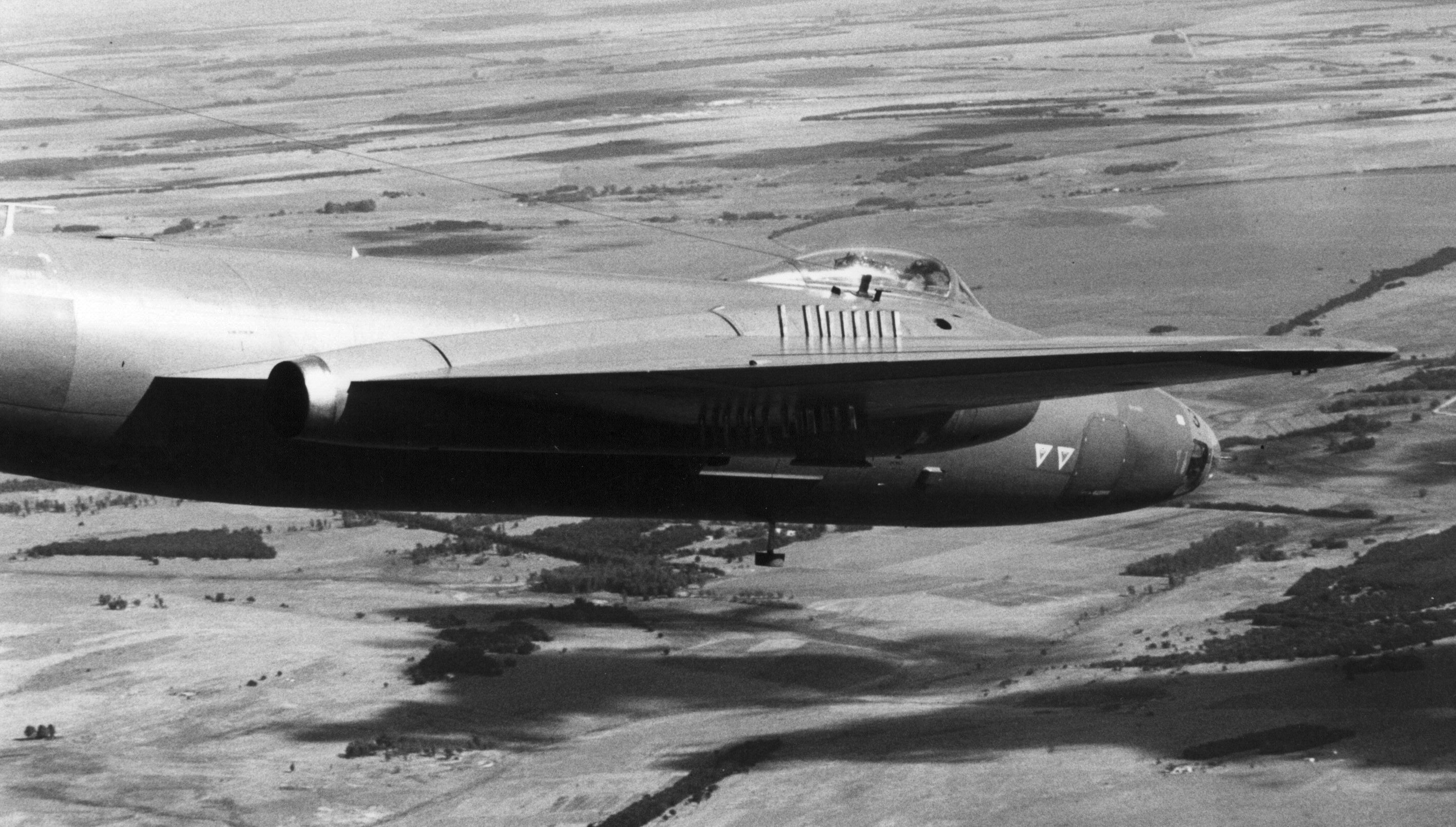
SAAF Canberra B.12 with inertial navigation and special sensors package over Transvaal

During the Suez Crisis, the RAF employed around 100 Canberras, flying conventional bombing and reconnaissance missions from airfields in Malta and Cyprus. A total of 278 Canberra sorties were flown, dropping 1,439 bombs weighing 1,000 lbs (450 kg) each. However low-level strikes by smaller fighters were judged to be more effective than the night-time bombing operations performed by both the Canberra and the Vickers Valiant. In addition, many of the bombs, intended to hit Egyptian airfields, missed their targets, failing to inflict much damage to the Egyptian Air Force or to badly demoralise the enemy. While interception of the Canberra was within the capabilities of Egypt's MiG-15s and MiG-17s, as shown by the interception of Canberras by MiG-15s prior to the Anglo-French invasion, these did not result in any losses. The only Canberra shot down during the Suez campaign was a PR.7 shot down by a Syrian Gloster Meteor fighter on 6 November 1956, the last day of the war.

The Federation of Rhodesia and Nyasaland considered the Canberra an important objective to holding greater diplomatic sway in the African continent, and ongoing negotiations over the Baghdad treaty, and a step towards decolonisation. The Suez Crisis caused a delay in the sale, but in August 1957 18 Canberras had been earmarked to be refurbished and transferred from the RAF to the Royal Rhodesian Air Force (RRAF). Both Rhodesia and South Africa used Canberras in their respective Bush Wars; numerous aircraft were lost in the conflict, only one of which was lost by the South African Air Force. Rhodesian B.2 Canberras together with South African B(I).12 Canberras carried out attacks on insurgents in Mozambique, usually armed with 'Alpha' cluster bombs, several raids on Zambia, and attacks upon multiple insurgent bases in Angola. Ethiopian Canberras were used against Eritrea and again against Somalia during the 1970s.

=== Sweden ===
The Swedish Air Force purchased two Canberras from the RAF in 1960, and had these modified to T.11s by Boulton Paul. The aircraft were secretly modified in Sweden as espionage aircraft for eavesdropping on primarily Soviet, Polish, and East German military radio transmissions, although this was not publicly admitted until 10 years later. The Canberras were given the designation Tp 52, and taken into service as "testing aircraft", until they were replaced by two Tp 85 Caravelles in 1971.

=== South America ===
==== Venezuela ====
On 20 April 1960, the Venezuelan Air Force used its Canberra B.2 and B(I).8s to bomb the airport at San Cristóbal, Táchira, which had been seized by rebels, led by General Jose Maria Castro León. The rebels surrendered shortly afterward. On 26 June 1961, Venezuela's Canberras were used against rebelling Army forces in Barcelona, Venezuela.

==== Peru ====
Peruvian Air Force Canberras flew combat sorties against Ecuadorian positions during the Cenepa War in 1995. On 6 February 1995, a Canberra B.68 disappeared over the operations zone; the aircraft had apparently struck a hill in poor weather conditions. Peru retired its Canberras in June 2005 and the survivors put in reserve until 2008. Peru bought 9 B(I).78 ex-(B(I).8) in 1956, 6 B.72 ex-(B.2) in 1966, 3 T.74 ex-(T.4) in 1966, 6 B(I).56 ex-(B.6), and 12 B(I).68 ex-(B(I).8) in 1974. They also bought 5 ex-SAAF B(I).12 ex-(B(I).8) and 1 T.74 ex-(T.4).

==== Argentina ====
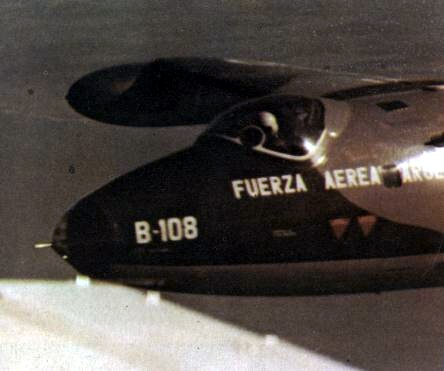
Canberra B-108 lost in the 1982 Falklands War

The Argentine Air Force received ten B.62 bombers and two T.64 trainers in the early 1970s, replacing the Avro Lincoln in the bomber role. Argentina retired its last Canberras in April 2000. During the Falklands War in 1982, eight Canberras were deployed to Trelew, 670 mi (1,080 km) from the Falkland Islands, to avoid congestion at the closer southern airfields. Although within operational range of the British task force, the type was considered a limited threat due to its poor manoeuvrability compared with the Sea Harrier.

Between 1 May and 14 June 1982, Argentine Canberras flew 54 sorties, including 36 bombing missions, 22 of which were at night. Two aircraft were lost in combat. The first was shot down by a Sea Harrier firing an AIM-9L Sidewinder air-to-air missile on 1 May 1982. The second, a Canberra B.62 of Grupo de Bombardeo 2, serial B-108, was shot down on 13 June 1982 at 39,000 ft (12,000 m) by a Sea Dart missile fired from HMS Exeter (D89). The pilot, Captain Pastrán, ejected, while the navigator, Captain Casado, was killed. This was the last Argentine aircraft lost in combat during the conflict, with Argentine forces surrendering the following day.

=== Royal New Zealand Air Force ===
The Royal New Zealand Air Force (RNZAF) leased 17 Canberra B.2s and three T.4s from the RAF from 1958 to 1962 pending delivery of their own Canberras. The leased Canberras were operated by No. 75 Squadron RNZAF out of RAF Tengah, Singapore, and were used in operations during the Malayan Emergency. One aircraft was destroyed during this period.

The RNZAF took delivery of 11 B(I).12s and two T.13 trainers between 1959 and 1961, and these were operated by No. 14 Squadron RNZAF. In 1964, No. 14 Squadron was deployed to RAF Tengah and participated in the Indonesia–Malaysia confrontation before returning to New Zealand in November 1966. Three of the B(I).12s were destroyed in accidents. The Canberra was replaced by the A-4K Skyhawk in 1970, and the eight surviving B(I).12s and the two T.13s were sold to India.

=== Development and trials aircraft ===
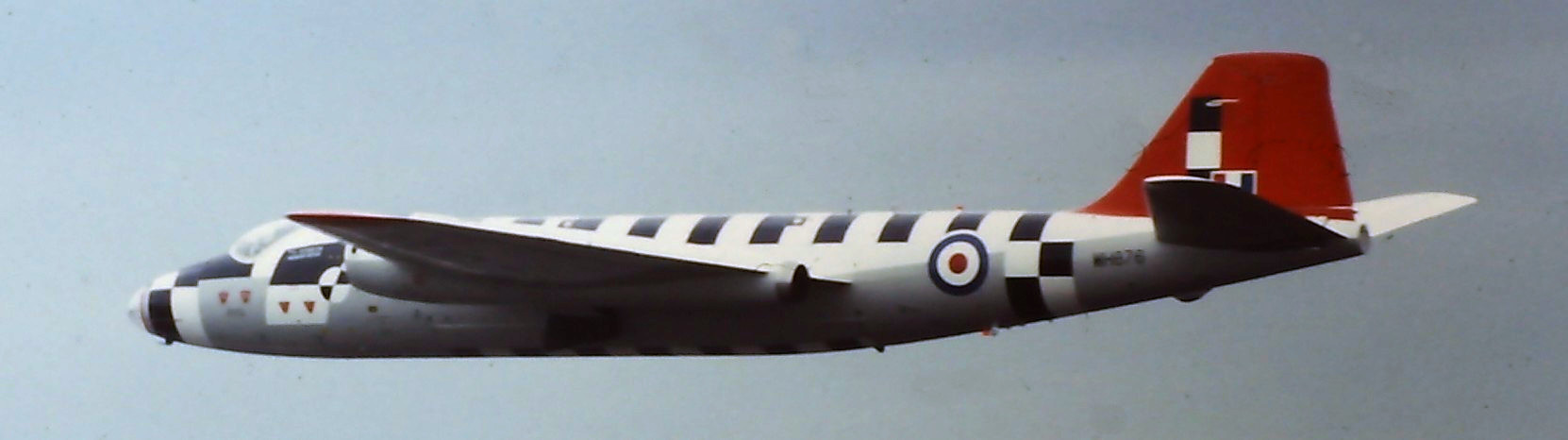
A former Canberra B.2 (WH876) used for development and trials work, 1980

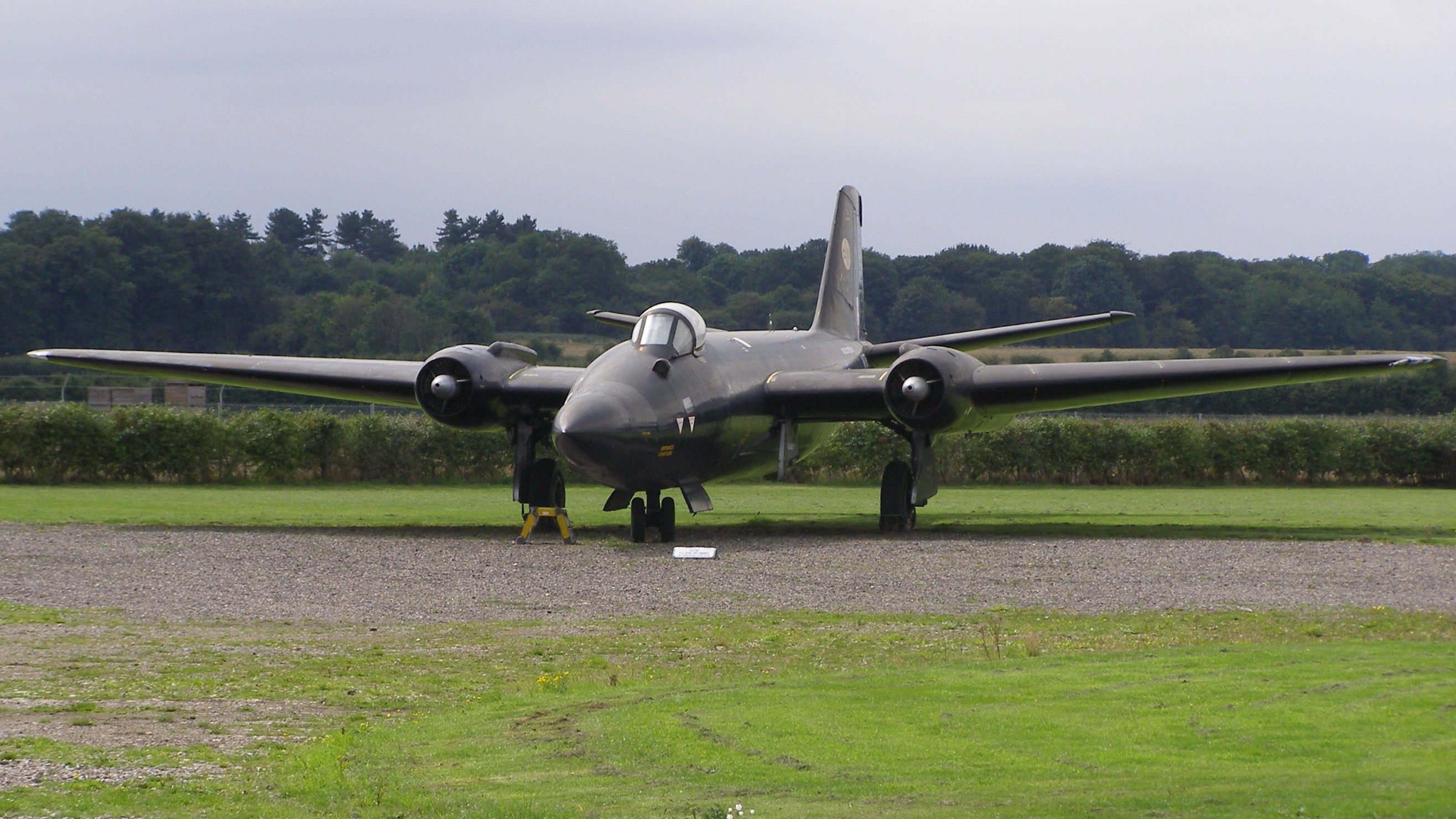
Modified Canberra B.2 (WV787) at Newark Air Museum

A number of Canberras were used by English Electric for development work and trials on new equipment. It was also used by government establishments such as the Royal Aircraft Establishment and the Royal Radar Establishment. The Canberra proved to be a useful platform for such work and was used by a number of British tests and trials establishments. A number of engine manufacturers were also lent Canberras as engine test beds: Armstrong Siddeley for the Sapphire, Bristol Siddeley for the Olympus, de Havilland Engine Company for the Gyron Junior turbojet, and Rolls-Royce Limited for the Avon. Ferranti used four different Canberra B.2s for avionics development work.

One example is WV787, built as a Canberra B.2 in 1952, it was lent to Armstrong Siddeley and fitted with Sapphire engines. It was later transferred to Ferranti for trials for the Blackburn Buccaneer's Blue Parrot radar and fitted with a B(I).8 type nose and a Buccaneer-style radome. It next was moved to the Aeroplane and Armament Experimental Establishment where it was modified to be used as a water-spray tanker aircraft for de-icing trials. It would fly in front of the aircraft being tested, which would fly into the artificial cloud created by the sprayed water to induce icing. It was retired in 1984 and later preserved at the Newark Air Museum and is a National Benchmark airframe on the National Aviation Heritage Register.

=== Flight records set by Canberras ===
- 21 January 1951 – first nonstop unrefuelled transatlantic crossing by a jet
- 26 August 1952 – the prototype B.5 made the first double transatlantic crossing by a jet, with a total time of 10 hr, 3 min.
- 4 May 1953 – Canberra B.2 WD952, fitted with Rolls-Royce Olympus engines set a world altitude record, flying at 63,668 ft (19,406 m)
- 9 October 1953 – winner of the 1953 London-Christchurch Air Race, it covered 12,270 miles (19,750 km) in 23 hr, 51min; its average speed was 515 miles per hour (829 km/h). As of 2018, this record still stands.
- 29 August 1955 – altitude record, 65,889 ft (20,083 m)
- 28 August 1957 – altitude record, 70,310 ft (21,430 m): Canberra B.2 (WK163) with a Napier Double Scorpion rocket motor

== Variants ==
See Martin B-57 Canberra article for the US-built variants.

English Electric A.1
Company designation for the first four aircraft before being named Canberra.
Canberra B.1
Prototypes for type development work and research at first known by the company designation A.1, four built.
Canberra B.2
First production version, crew increased to three with addition of bomb aimer, Avon R.A.3 engines with 6,500 lbf (28.91 kN) of thrust, wingtip fuel tanks. 418 built by English Electric (208), Avro (75), Handley Page (75) and Short Brothers & Harland (60) including eight for export (Australia, United States and Venezuela).
Canberra PR.3
Photo-reconnaissance version with a 14-inch section added to the fuselage to house the camera bay, internal fuel was increased and flat panel in the nose was removed. Needed only two crew. The prototype was flown on 19 March 1950 and the variant entered service in 1953.
Canberra T.4
First trainer variant with dual controls and a crew of three.
Canberra B.5
Prototype of second-generation Canberra intended as a target marker version and incorporating leading edge fuel tanks in the wings and Avon R.A.7 engines with 7,490 lbf (33.32 kN) of thrust, one built.
Canberra B.6
Production version based on B.5, 106 built by English Electric (57) and Short Brothers & Harland (49), includes 12 for export.
Canberra B.6(RC)
RC = Radio Countermeasures (also known as B.6(Mod) or PR16) – Specialist ELINT version with enlarged nose and Blue Shadow Side Looking Airborne Radar (SLAR). Only four produced, extended nose.
Canberra B(I).6
Interim interdictor version for the RAF pending delivery of the B(I)8. Based on the B.6 with a detachable ventral pack housing four 20 mm Hispano Mk.V cannon for strafing; also had provision for two wing hard points. LABS (Low-Altitude Bombing System) for delivery of nuclear bombs. 22 produced.
Canberra PR.7
Photo-reconnaissance version based on B.6, had similar equipment to the PR.3 and the same 14-inch section added to the fuselage, but had the uprated Avon 109 engines of the B.6 and increased internal fuel capacity, 74 built.
Canberra B(I).8
Third-generation Canberra derived from B.6 as an interdictor. Fitted with a new forward fuselage with teardrop canopy on the port side, and Navigator station forward of pilot (early marks had the navigator behind the pilot). Provision for a ventral pack similar to the B(I).6 with 4 20 mm (0.787 in) Hispano Mk.V cannon, one external hardpoint under each wing for up to 1,000 lb (454 kg) of bombs or unguided rockets, LABS (Low-Altitude Bombing System) for delivery of nuclear bombs. Prototype converted from the only B.5 and first flown 23 July 1954, 72 built including 17 for export and two converted from B.2s.

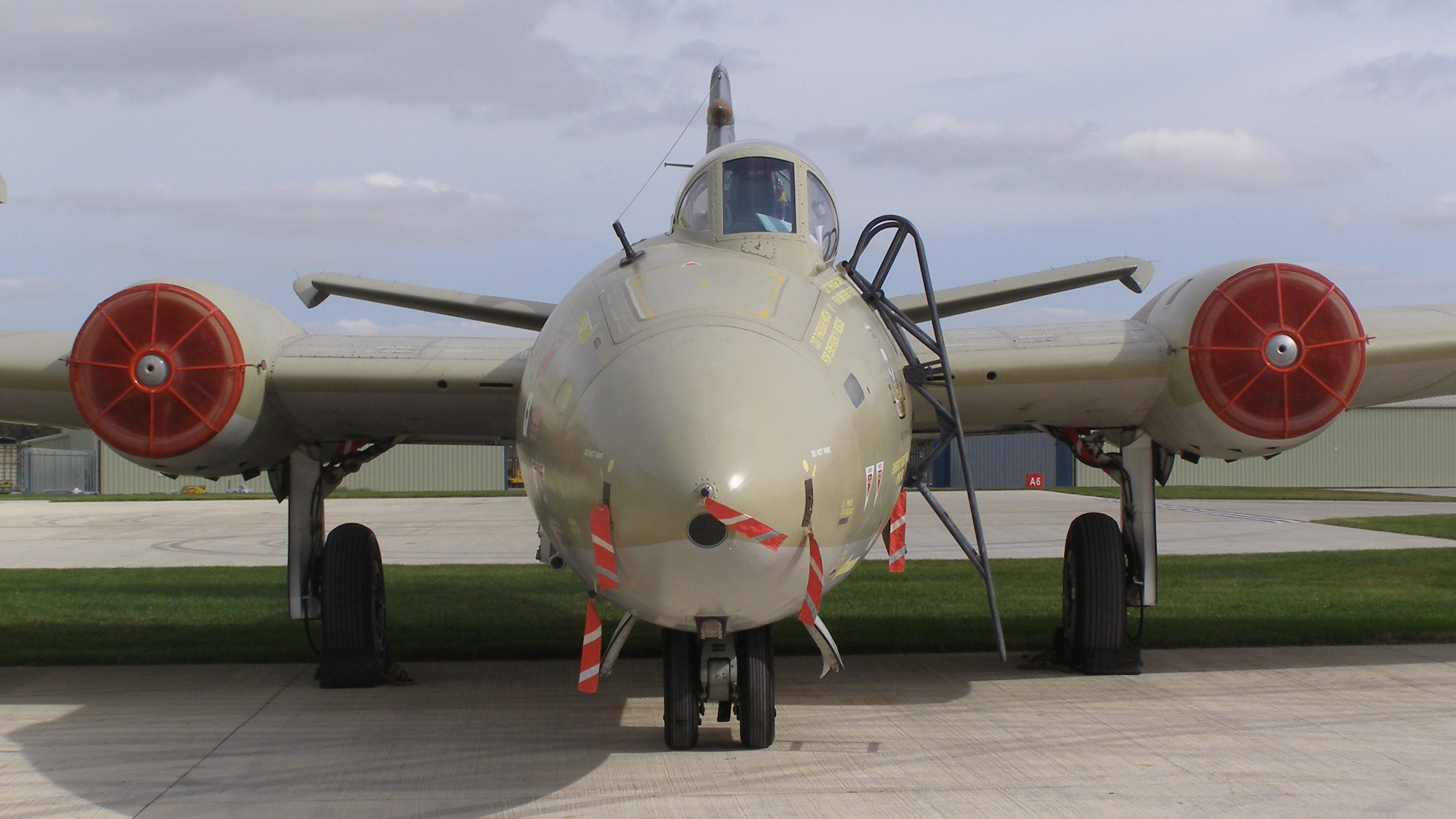
Preserved PR.9 XH135 at Kemble Airport. Note the offset pilot's canopy. The navigator sits inside the nose section.

Canberra PR.9
Photo-reconnaissance version based on B(I).8 with fuselage stretched to 68 ft (27.72 m), wingspan increased by 4 ft (1.22 m), and Avon R.A.27 (Avon 206) engines with 10,030 lbf (44.6 kN) of thrust. Had the offset canopy of the B(I).8 with a hinged nose to allow fitment of an ejection seat for the navigator. A total of 23 built by Short Brothers & Harland.
Canberra U.10 (later designated D.10)
Remote-controlled target drones converted from B.2. 18 converted.
Canberra T.11
Nine B.2s converted to trainers for pilots and navigators of all-weather interceptors to operate the Airborne Intercept radar, crew of four.
Canberra B(I).12
Canberra B(I).8 bombers built for New Zealand and South Africa.
Canberra T.13
Training version of the T.4 for New Zealand, one built new and one conversion from T.4.
Canberra U.14 (later designated D.14)
Remote-controlled target drones converted from the B.2 for Royal Navy. Six converted.
Canberra B.15
Upgraded B.6 for use in the Far and Near East with under-wing hard-points for 1,000 lb (450 kg) bombs or rockets. New avionics and fitting of three cameras, 39 conversions. Those operated by No. 32 Squadron and No. 73 Squadron were fitted with Nord AS.30 air-to-surface missiles.
Canberra B.16
Upgraded B.6 similar to B.15 in location and weaponry but fitted with Blue Shadow with the loss of an ejection seat, 19 conversions
Canberra T.17
Electronic warfare training variant used to train surface-based radar and missile operators and airborne fighter and Airborne Early Warning crews in handling jamming (including chaff dropping) aircraft. 24 conversions from B.2 with extended nose for sensors.

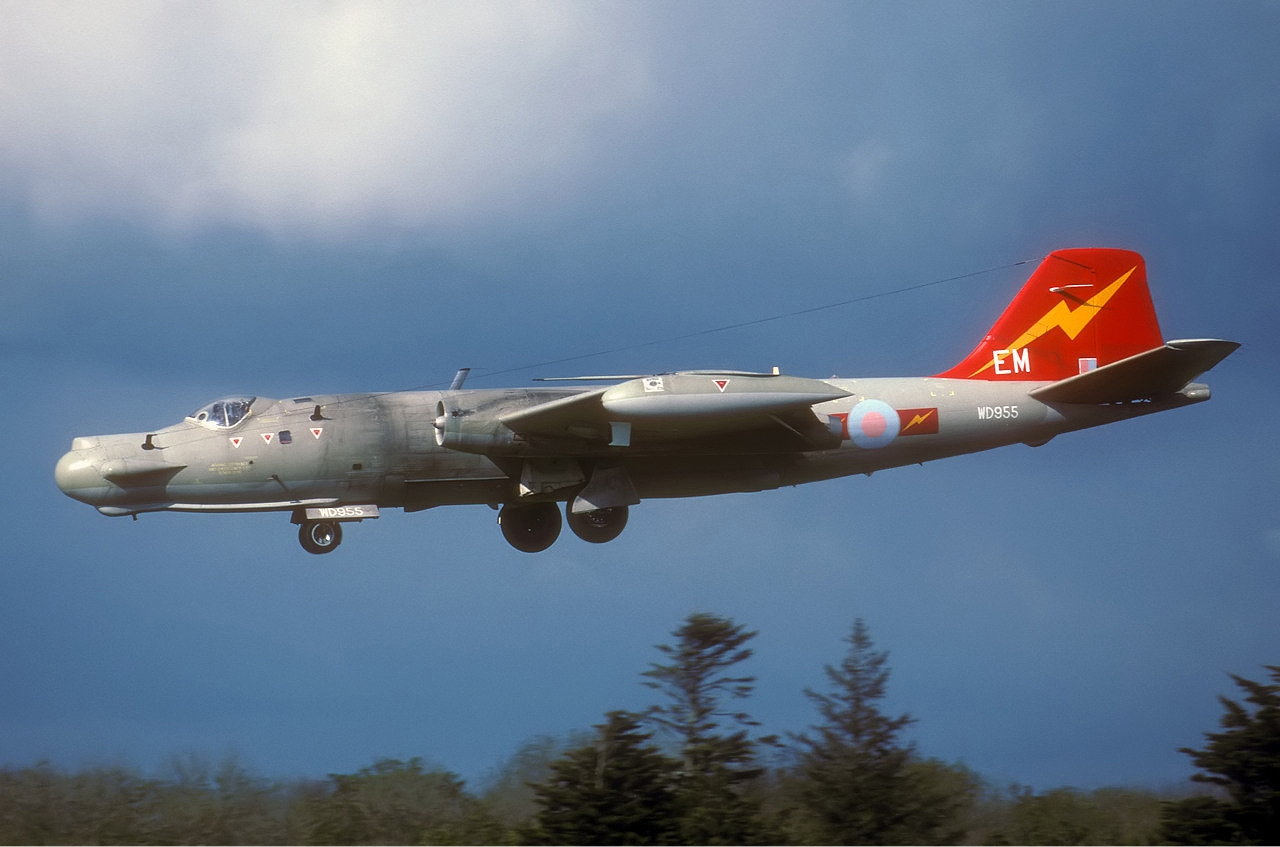
Canberra T17A

Canberra T.17A
Updated version of the T.17 with improved navigation aids, a spectrum analyser in place of the previously fitted AN/APR-20, and a powerful communications jammer. First example delivered to No. 360 Squadron RAF during April 1987.
Canberra TT.18
Target tug conversion of B.2 for the RAF and Royal Navy, 22 conversions.
Canberra T.19
T.11 with radar removed as silent target.
Canberra B.20
B.2 with additional fuel tanks in the wings, licence-built in Australia.
Canberra T.21
Trainers converted from B.2 and B.20.
Canberra T.22
Conversion of the PR.7 for Royal Navy's Fleet Requirements and Aircraft Direction Unit, used for training Buccaneer navigators.
Canberra B.52
Refurbished B.2 bombers sold to Ethiopia.
Canberra B(I).56
Refurbished B(I).6 bombers sold to Peru.
Canberra PR.57
Tropicalized PR.7 for India.
Canberra B(I).58
Tropicalized B(I)8 for India.
Canberra B.62
10 refurbished B.2 bombers sold to Argentina.
Canberra T.64
2 refurbished T.4 trainers sold to Argentina.
Canberra B(I).66
10 refurbished B(I).6 bombers sold to India.
Canberra PR.67
2 refurbished PR.7s sold to India.
Canberra B(I).68
1 refurbished B(I).8 bomber sold to Peru.
11 refurbished ex-SAAF B(I).12 sold to Peru
Canberra B(I).72
6 refurbished B.2 sold to Peru
Canberra T.74
3 refurbished T.4 sold to Peru. Peru obtained an ex-SAAF T.4 brought up to T.74 standard
Canberra B(I).78
9 refurbished B(I).8 sold to Peru

Canberra B.82

18 refurbished B.2 sold to Venezuela

Canberra B(I).82

4 converted B.82 sold to Venezuela

Canberra PR.83

2 refurbished PR.3 sold to Venezuela

Canberra T.84

2 refurbished T-4 sold to Venezuela

Canberra B(I).88

8 refurbished B(I).8 sold to Venezuela
Canberra B.92
1 modified B.2 for Argentina, not delivered and embargoed in 1982.
Canberra T.94
1 modified T.4 for Argentina, not delivered and embargoed in 1982.
Short SC.9
1 Canberra PR.9, modified by Shorts as SC.9 and fitted with an AI.23 radar, plus IR installation in the nose for Red Top air-to-air missile trials. Continued in use for radar missile development work, until broken up sometime between 1986 and 1998.
Short SD.1
1 Canberra PR.3, modified by Shorts as SD.1 to be launch vehicle carrying two Short SD.2 variants of the Beechcraft AQM-37 Jayhawk high-speed target missiles, apparently called Stiletto in the UK, for trials by the Royal Aircraft Establishment.
Canberra Tp52
Two B.2 aircraft modified with T.17 noses for ELINT duties with the Royal Swedish Air Force.

== Operators ==
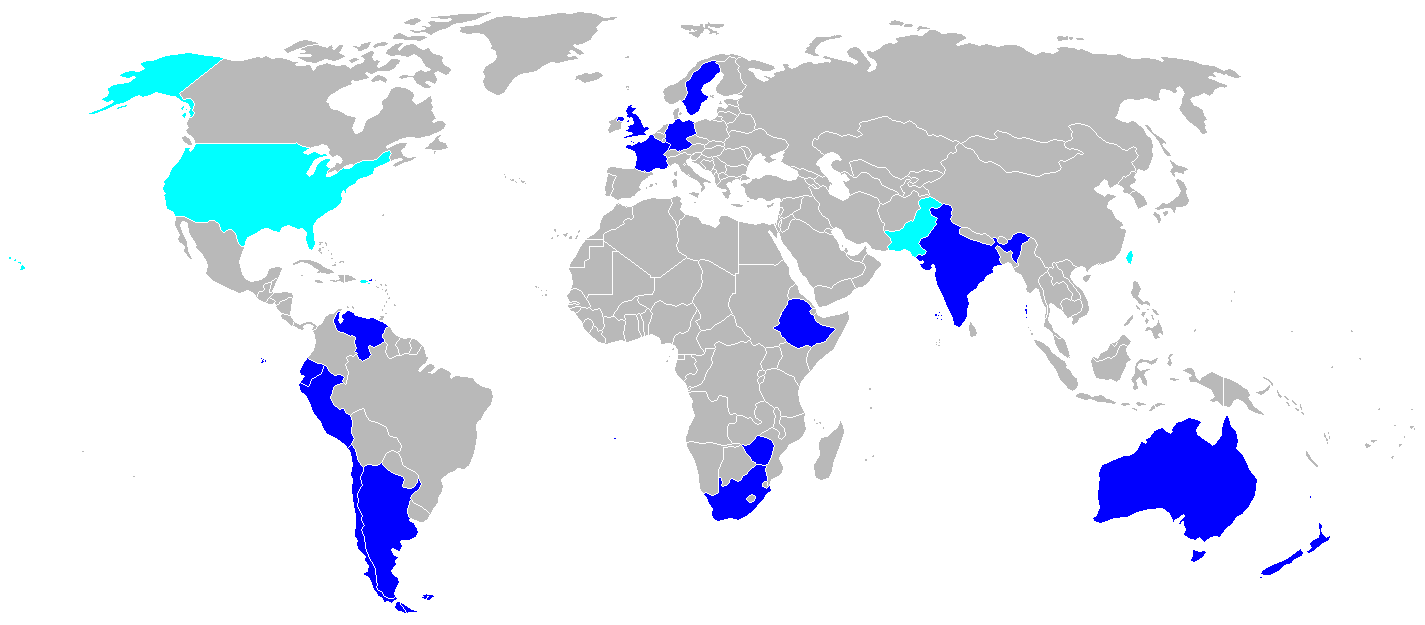
Operators Canberra B-57

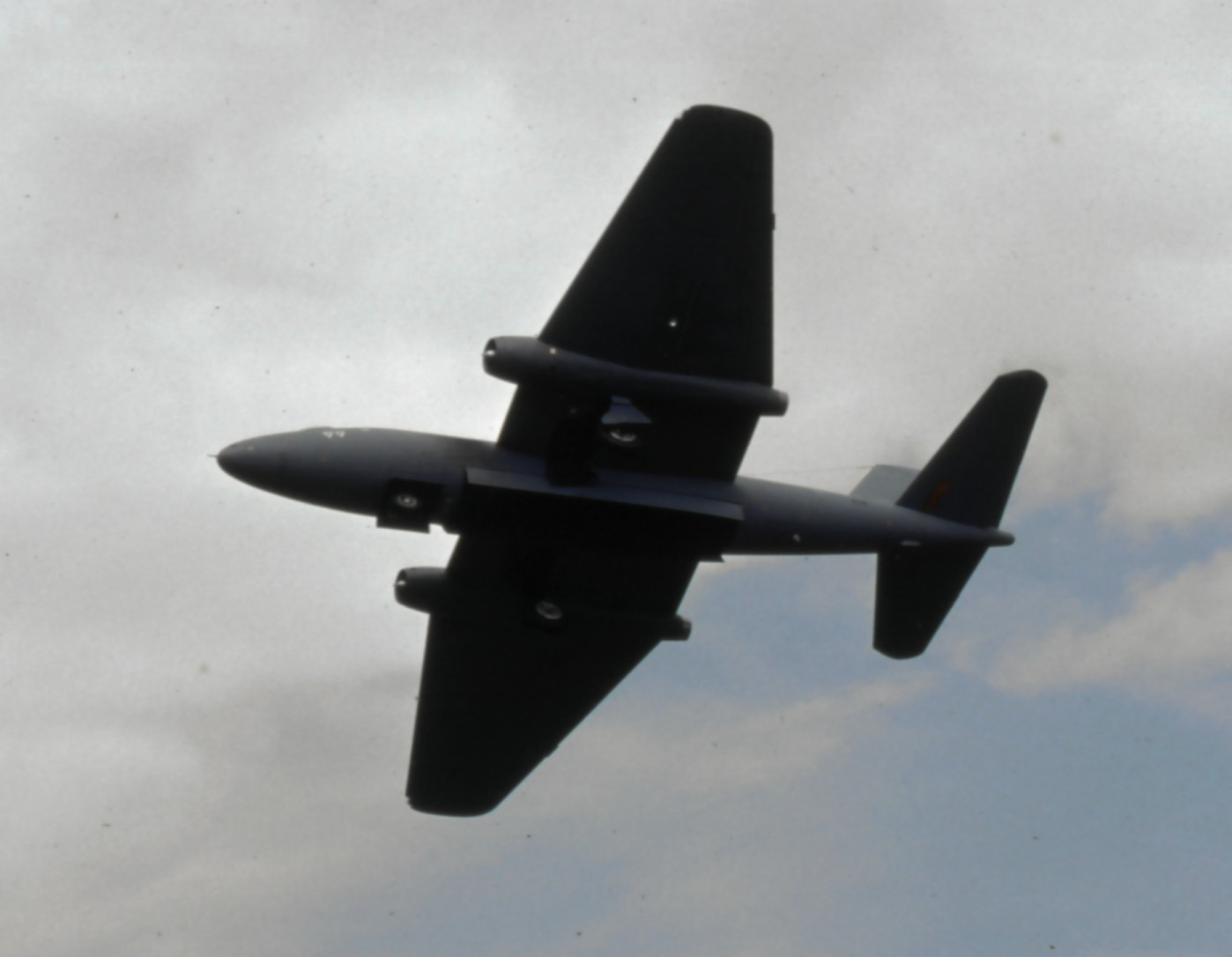
SAAF Canberra T.4 at AFB Waterkloof, circa 1980

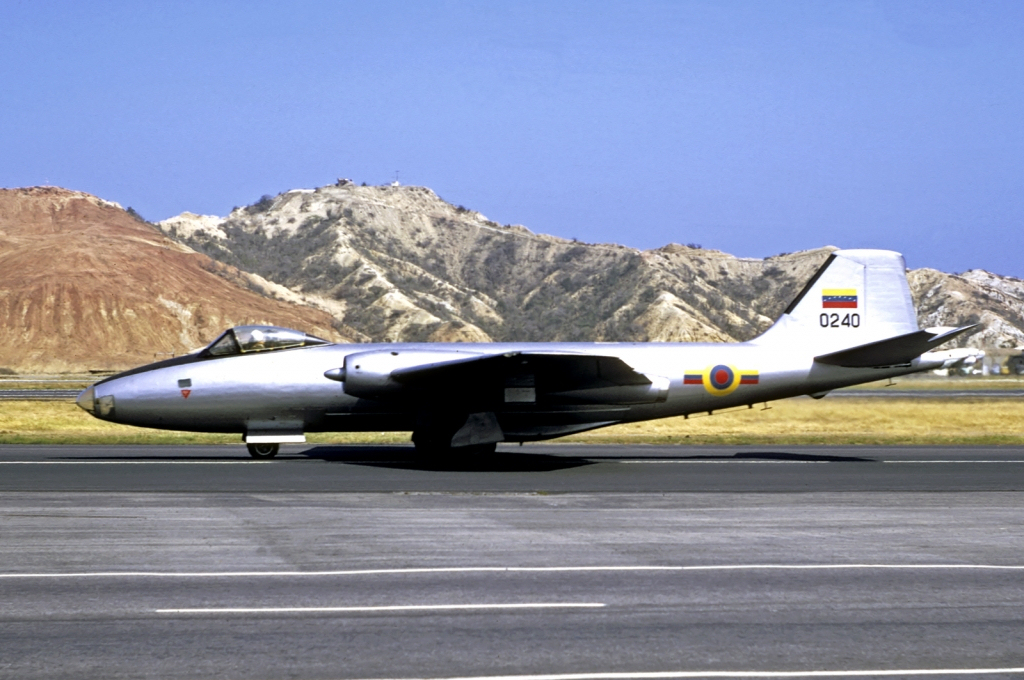
Venezuela Air Force Canberra, March 1972

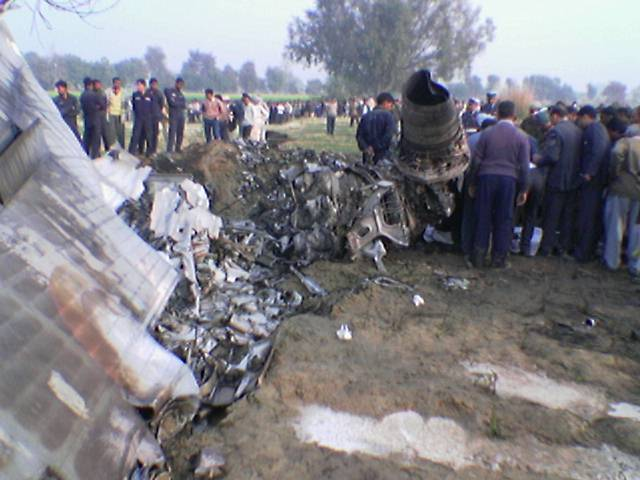
Wreckage of a crashed Indian air force Canberra in Agra, India on 19 December 2005

Argentina

- Argentine Air Force (12): purchased 10 refurbished ex-RAF B.2s and two T.4s (redesignated B62 and B64 respectively) in 1967. Two further aircraft were ordered in 1981 but were not delivered owing to the Falklands War.

Australia

- Royal Australian Air Force (58)
  - No. 1 Squadron RAAF
  - No. 2 Squadron RAAF
  - No. 6 Squadron RAAF
  - No. 1 Operational Conversion Unit RAAF
  - Aircraft Research and Development Unit RAAF
  - No. 1 Long Range Flight RAAF

Chile

- Chilean Air Force (3 PR.9)

Ecuador

- Ecuadorian Air Force: Six new-build B.2 variants delivered in 1955.

Ethiopia

Ethiopian Air Force (4)

France

- French Air Force (6)
  - Centre d'Essais en Vol
  - Centre du Tir et de Bombardement

India

- Indian Air Force (107)

New Zealand

- Royal New Zealand Air Force (13)
  - No. 14 Squadron RNZAF
  - No. 75 Squadron RNZAF

Peru

- Peruvian Air Force (60)

Rhodesia

- Royal Rhodesian Air Force (20)

South Africa

- South African Air Force (9)

Sweden

- Swedish Air Force (2)

United Kingdom

- Royal Air Force (782)

  - No. 3 Squadron RAF (1961–71) with variant(s) B(I).8
  - No. 6 Squadron RAF (1957–69) with variant(s) B.2, B.6 & B.16
  - No. 7 Squadron RAF (1970–82) with variant(s) B.2 & TT.18
  - No. 9 Squadron RAF (1952–56) with variant(s) B.2 & B.6
  - No. 10 Squadron RAF (1953–56) with variant(s) B.2
  - No. 12 Squadron RAF (1952–61) with variant(s) B.2 & B.6
  - No. 13 Squadron RAF (1956–82) with variant(s) PR.7 & PR.9
  - No. 14 Squadron RAF (1962–70) with variant(s) B(I).8
  - No. 15 Squadron RAF (1953–57) with variant(s) B.2
  - No. 16 Squadron RAF (1958–72) with variant(s) B(I).8
  - No. 17 Squadron RAF (1956–69) with variant(s) PR.7
  - No. 18 Squadron RAF (1953–57) with variant(s) B.2
  - No. 21 Squadron RAF (1953-57 & 1958-59) with variant(s) B.2 & B.6
  - No. 27 Squadron RAF (1953–57) with variant(s) B.2
  - No. 31 Squadron RAF (1955–71) with variant(s) PR.7
  - No. 32 Squadron RAF (1957–69) with variant(s) B.2 & B.15/E.15
  - No. 35 Squadron RAF (1954–61) with variant(s) B.2
  - No. 39 Squadron RAF (1958–82) with variant(s) PR.3, PR.7 & PR.9
  - No. 40 Squadron RAF (1953–57) with variant(s) B.2
  - No. 44 Squadron RAF (1953–57) with variant(s) B.2
  - No. 45 Squadron RAF (1957–70) with variant(s) B.2 & B.15/E.15
  - No. 50 Squadron RAF (1952–59) with variant(s) B.2
  - No. 51 Squadron RAF (1958–76) with variant(s) B.2 & B.6
  - No. 57 Squadron RAF (1953–57) with variant(s) B.2
  - No. 58 Squadron RAF (1953–70) with variant(s) PR.3, PR.7 & PR.9
  - No. 59 Squadron RAF (1956–61) with variant(s) B.2 & B(I).8
  - No. 61 Squadron RAF (1954–58) with variant(s) B.2
  - No. 69 Squadron RAF (1954–58) with variant(s) PR.3
  - No. 73 Squadron RAF (1957–69) with variant(s) B.2 & B.15/E.15
  - No. 76 Squadron RAF (1953–60) with variant(s) B.2 & B.6
  - No. 80 Squadron RAF (1955–69) with variant(s) PR.7
  - No. 81 Squadron RAF (1960–70) with variant(s) PR.7
  - No. 82 Squadron RAF (1953–56) with variant(s) PR.3 & PR.7
  - No. 85 Squadron RAF (1963–75) with variant(s) B.2, PR.3, T.11 & T.19
  - No. 88 Squadron RAF (1956–62) with variant(s) B(I).8
  - No. 90 Squadron RAF (1953–56) with variant(s) B.2
  - No. 97 Squadron RAF (1963–67) with variant(s) B.2
  - No. 98 Squadron RAF (1963–76) with variant(s) B.2 & B.15/E.15
  - No. 100 Squadron RAF (1954-59 & 1972-82) with variant(s) B.2, B.6, PR.7, B(I).8, B.15/E.15, TT.18 & T.19
  - No. 101 Squadron RAF (1951–57) with variant(s) B.2 & B.6
  - No. 102 Squadron RAF (1954–56) with variant(s) B.2
  - No. 103 Squadron RAF (1954–56) with variant(s) B.2
  - No. 104 Squadron RAF (1955–56) with variant(s) B.2
  - No. 109 Squadron RAF (1952–57) with variant(s) B.2 & B.6
  - No. 115 Squadron RAF (1954–57) with variant(s) B.2
  - No. 139 Squadron RAF (1952–59) with variant(s) B.2 & B.6
  - No. 149 Squadron RAF (1953–56) with variant(s) B.2
  - No. 151 Squadron RAF (1962–63) with variant(s) B.2
  - No. 192 Squadron RAF (1953–58) with variant(s) B.2 & B.6
  - No. 199 Squadron RAF (1954–58) with variant(s) B.2
  - No. 207 Squadron RAF (1954–56) with variant(s) B.2
  - No. 213 Squadron RAF (1956–69) with variant(s) B.6
  - No. 214 Squadron RAF (1955) with variant(s) PR.7
  - No. 245 Squadron RAF (1958–63) with variant(s) B.2
  - No. 249 Squadron RAF (1957–69) with variant(s) B.2, B.6 & B.16
  - No. 360 Squadron RAF (1966–75) with variant(s) B.2, B.6, T.17 & T.17A
  - No. 361 Squadron RAF (1967) with variant(s) T.17
  - No. 527 Squadron RAF (1954–58) with variant(s) B.2 & PR.7
  - No. 540 Squadron RAF (1952–56) with variant(s) B.2, PR.3 & PR.7
  - No. 542 Squadron RAF (1955–58) with variant(s) B.2, B.6 & PR.7
  - No. 617 Squadron RAF (1952–55) with variant(s) B.2 & B.6
  - No. 231 Operational Conversion Unit RAF (1951-90 & 1991-93)

- Royal Navy Fleet Air Arm (69)
  - 727 Naval Air Squadron – RNAS Hal Far, Malta
  - Fleet Requirements Unit (FRU)
  - Fleet Requirements and Aircraft Direction Unit (FRADU)
- Royal Aircraft Establishment/DERA (2)
  - RAE Bedford & DERA Llanbedr

United States

- United States Air Force (two only for B-57 development)

Venezuela

- Venezuelan Air Force (46)

West Germany

- West German Air Force (3)

Zimbabwe

- Air Force of Zimbabwe: No. 5 Squadron operated Canberra B.2s and T.4s. The last aircraft were retired in 1983.

== Surviving aircraft ==
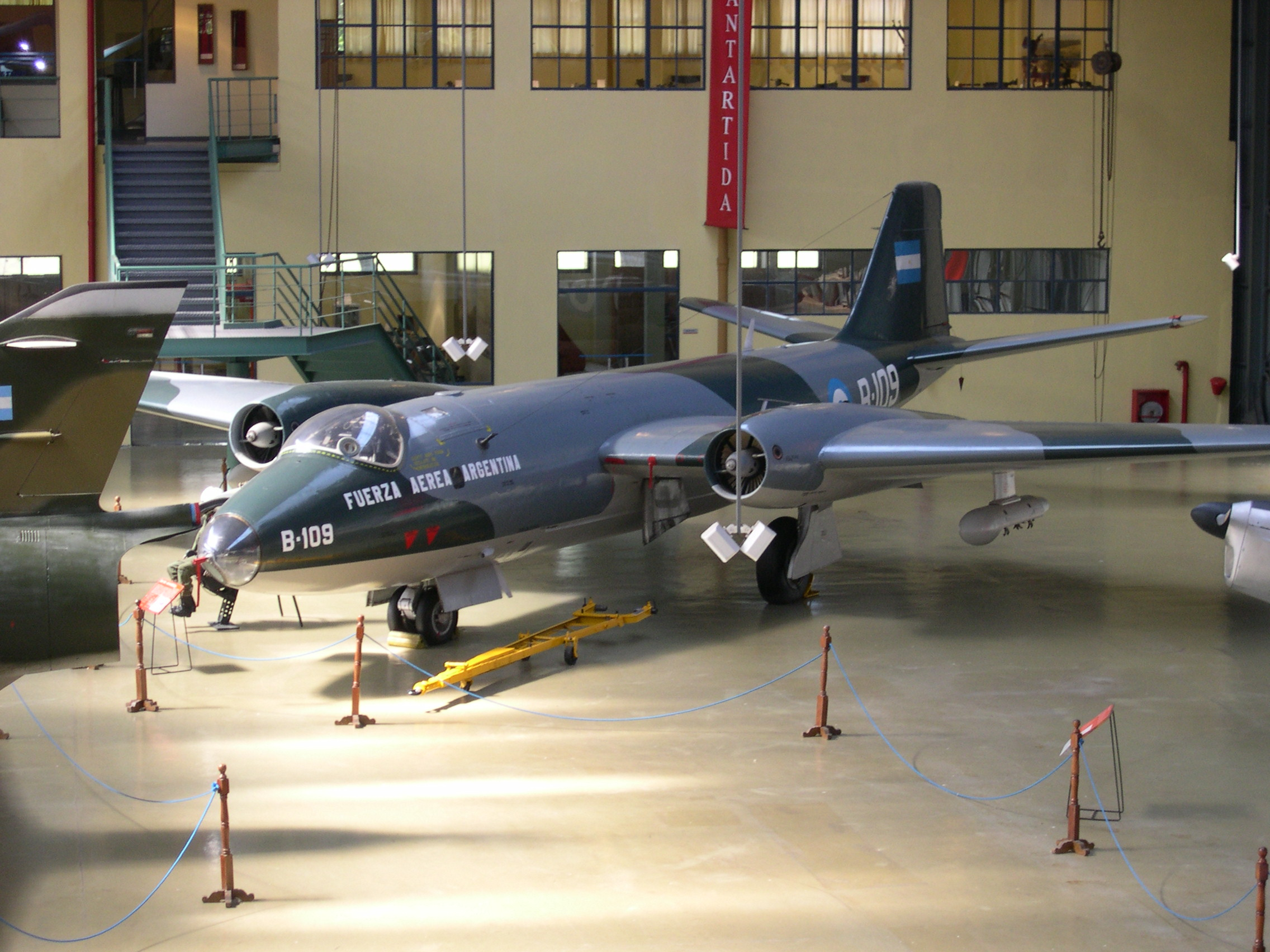
Argentine Air Force Canberra Mk.62 at Museo Nacional de Aeronáutica in Buenos Aires

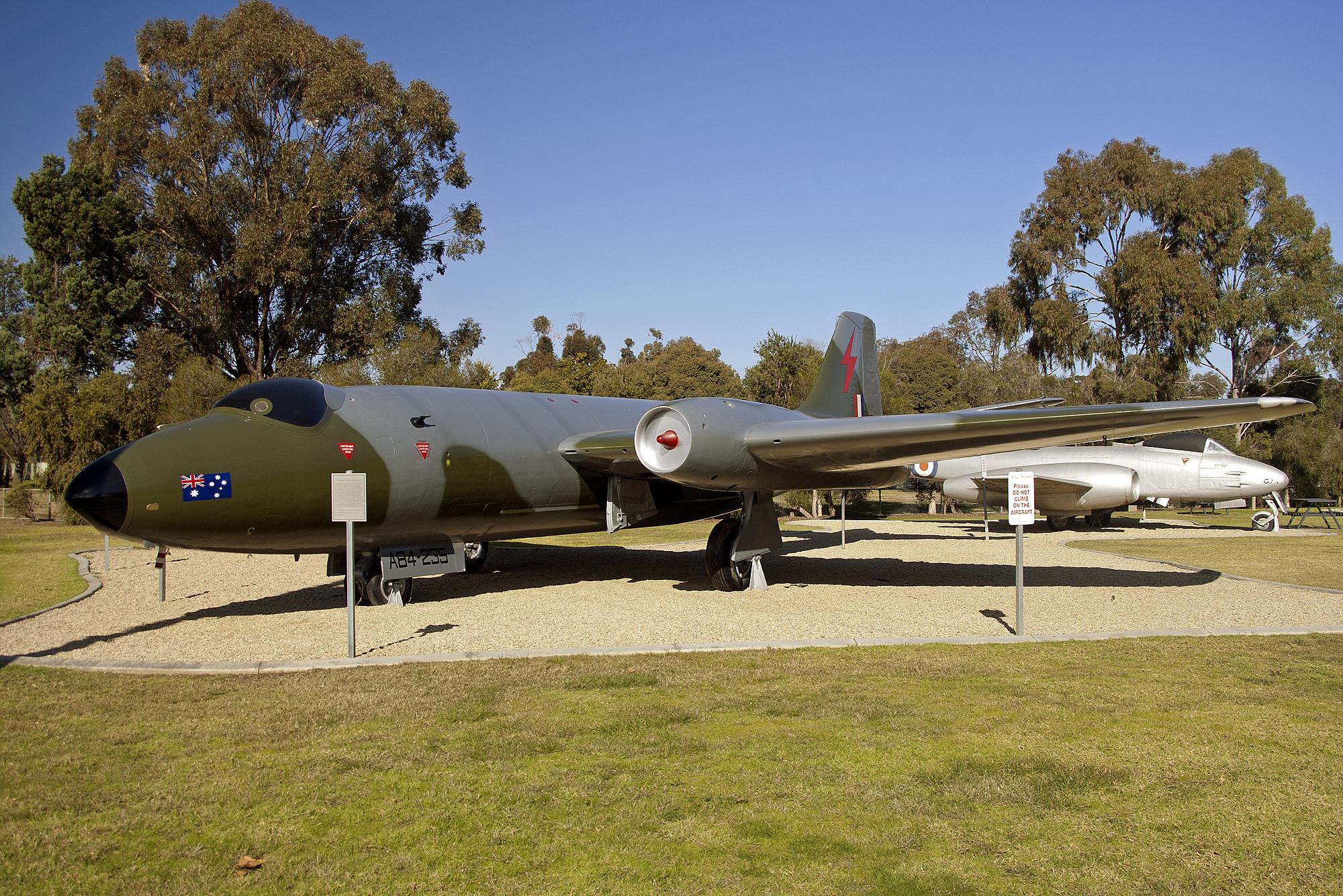
Canberra Mk 20 (A84-235) in RAAF No. 2 Squadron livery. On display at RAAF Base Wagga

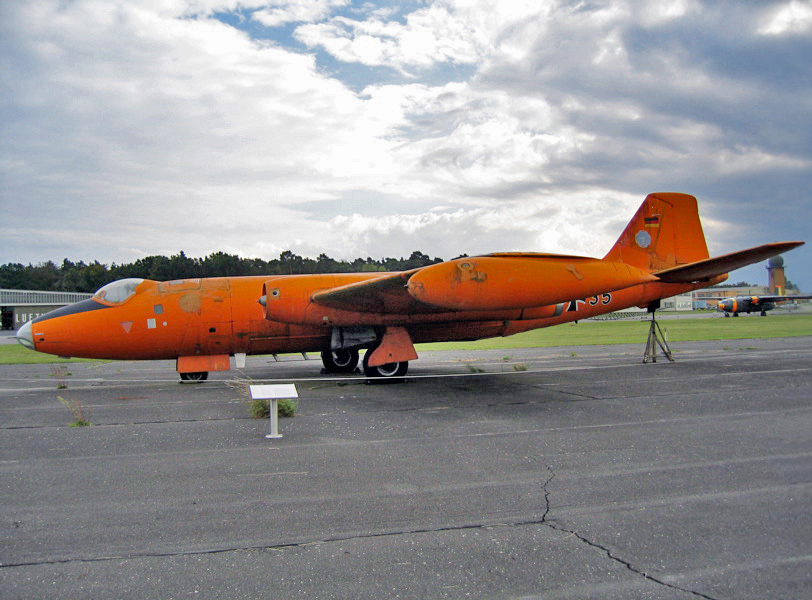
One of three Canberras operated by the Luftwaffe at the museum at Gatow Airport

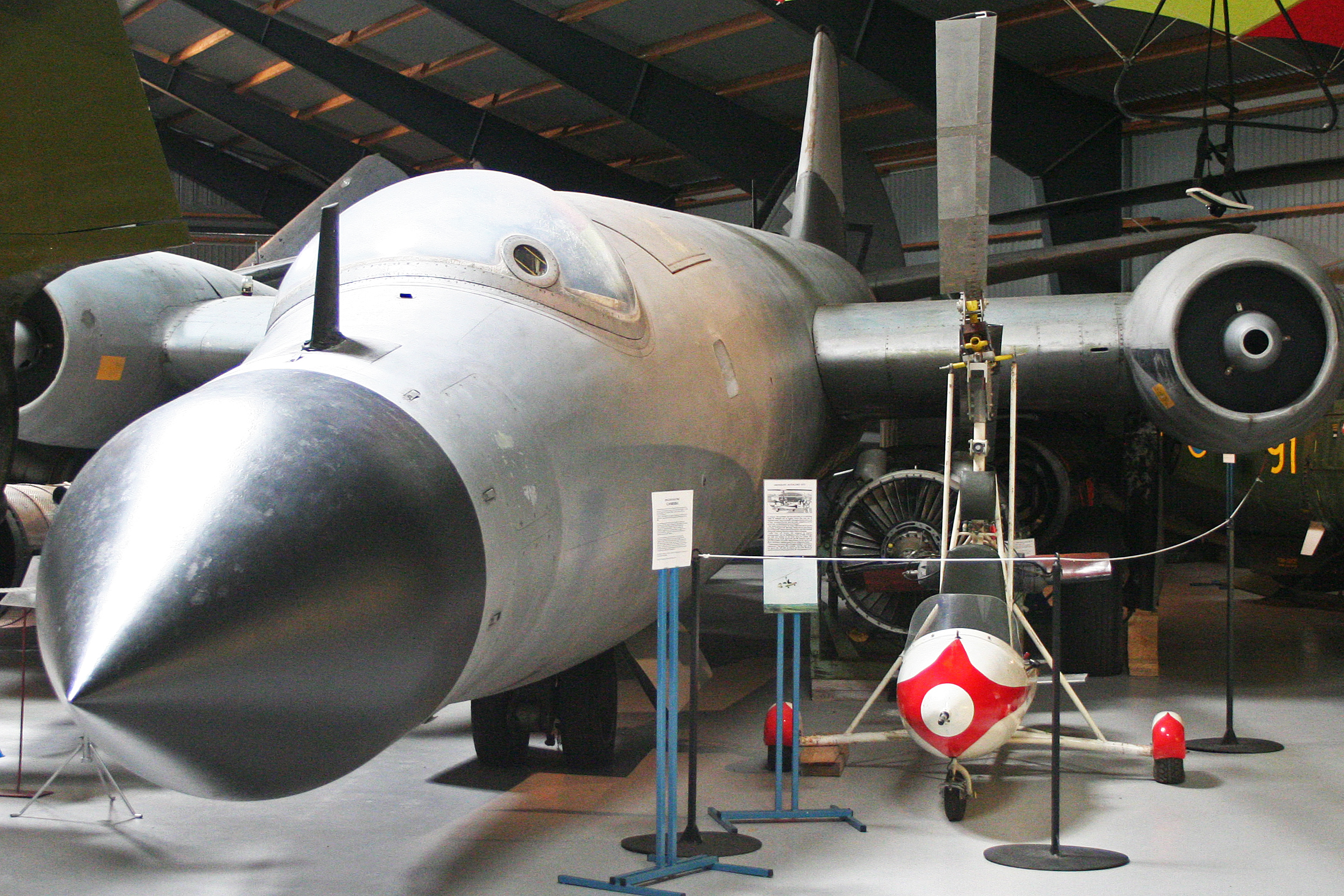
A Swedish Air Force Tp 52, (a Canberra T.11 secretly converted for ELINT missions), at Svedinos Museum

Several ex-RAF machines and RB-57s remain flying in the US for research and mapping work. About 10 airworthy Canberras are in private hands today, and are flown at air displays.

=== Argentina ===
At least six Canberras retired from the Argentine Air Force have been preserved in Argentina:

- B Mk.62 B-101, Escuela de Suboficiales de la Fuerza Aérea, province of Córdoba.
- B Mk.62 B-102 (ex-RAF WJ713). Retired in 1998, and assigned to "Museo Nacional de Malvinas", Oliva, province of Córdoba.
- B Mk.62 B-105. On display at Mar del Plata Airport, province of Buenos Aires.
- B Mk.62 B-109, the last one to complete a mission in the Falklands War, is on display at the Museo Nacional de Aeronáutica de Argentina.
- T Mk.64 B-111, on static display at the 2nd Air Brigade in Paraná, Entre Ríos.
- B Mk.64 B-112, is on display at a junction in Paraná, Entre Ríos.

=== Australia ===
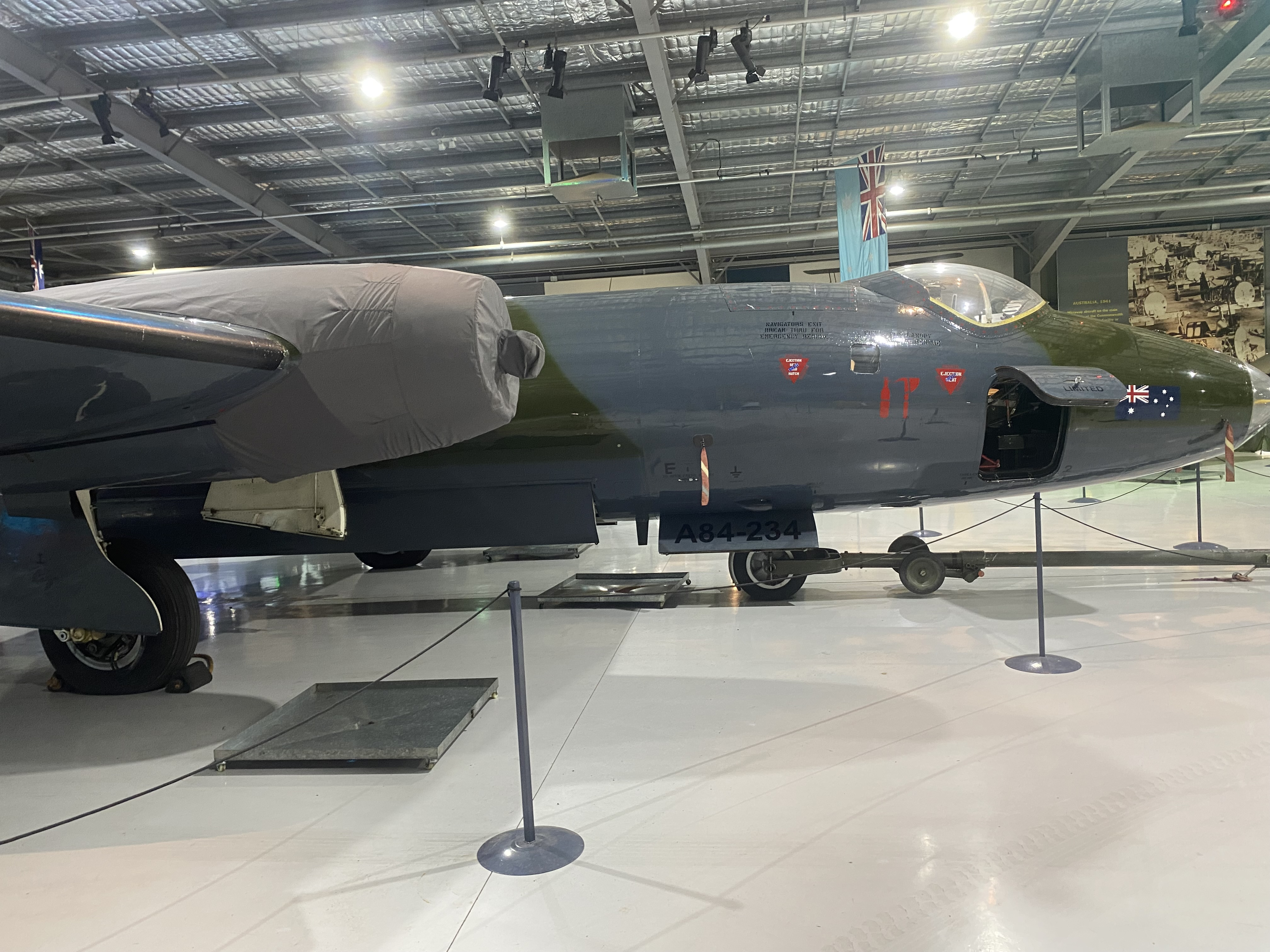
- WJ680 in the Temora Aviation Museum, 2024.
  ex-WJ680 (Royal Air Force) is at the Temora Aviation Museum in Temora. It was acquired in 2001 and the aircraft was fully restored to airworthiness and painted to represent the Canberras flown by No. 2 Squadron RAAF during the Vietnam war. It is Australia's only airworthy Canberra. Ownership was transferred to the RAAF in July 2019 and it is operated by the Air Force Heritage Squadron (Temora Historic Flight). After a three-year restoration process, the Temora Aviation Museum, Australia, has completed the successful test flight of TT.18 WJ680. The flight, which took place on 27 June 2021, marks the first time the aircraft has flown in 11 years, last taking to the skies on 5 June 2010. The museum's Canberra is now the only airworthy example in the world, apart from three that are still in use with NASA for research purposes.
- WK165, an ex-RAF Canberra B.2, is on display at the South Australian Aviation Museum at Port Adelaide.
- A84-125 is stored at RAAF Base Amberley.
- A84-201 (the first Australian-built GAF Canberra) is at RAAF Base Amberley in the base memorial garden.
- A84-203 is on display at Evans Head Memorial Aerodrome.
- A84-204 is on display at Meandarra ANZAC Memorial Museum.
- A84-208 is privately owned and stored at Rupanyup.
- A84-209 is privately owned at Camden Museum of Aviation.
- A84-210 is privately owned at Mareeba.
- A84-219 is on display at Brymaroo, Queensland.
- Parts of A84-220 are on display in the Air Warfare Centre at RAAF Base Edinburgh.
- The cockpit of A84-222 is preserved at the Australian National Aviation Museum in Moorabbin Airport.
- A84-223 is on display outside No. 2 Squadron HQ at RAAF Base Williamtown.
- A84-224 is privately owned at Denison, Victoria.
- A84-225 is on display at Queensland Air Museum, Caloundra Airport.
- A84-226 is under restoration at the Australian National Aviation Museum. It was previously on display at RAAF Base Wagga.
- A84-230 is on display at the Aviation Heritage Museum in Bull Creek, Western Australia.
- A84-232 is privately owned and stored at Avalon Airport.
- The front fuselage of A84-234 is on display at the RAAF Museum.
- A84-235 is on display in the museum at RAAF Base Wagga.
- A84-236 is on display at the RAAF Museum.
- A84-238 is on display in a park at Willowbank, Queensland, adjacent to A84-248.
- A84-241 is on display at Woomera Missile Park, Woomera, South Australia.
- A84-242 is on display at the RAAF Base Amberley Aviation Heritage Centre.
- A84-245 is on display at the Defence Science & Technology Group, Fishermans Bend.
- A84-247 was gifted to the Australian War Memorial in 1982 and is stored dismantled, pending restoration.
- A84-248 is on display in a park at Willowbank, Queensland, adjacent to A84-238.
- A84-307 is on display at the National Vietnam Veterans Museum, Phillip Island
- A84-502 is preserved by the Historical Aircraft Restoration Society at Shellharbour Airport.

=== Germany ===
- Luftwaffe Canberra B.2 99+34, (former RAF WK137) is on display at the Internationales Luftfahrt-Museum, Villingen-Schwenningen, Germany.
- Luftwaffe Canberra B.2 99+35, (former RAF WK138) is on display at the Militärhistorisches Museum Flugplatz Berlin-Gatow at former RAF Gatow, Berlin, Germany.
- Luftwaffe Canberra B.2 99+36, (former RAF WK130) is on display at the Auto & Technik Museum Sinsheim at Sinsheim, Germany.
- RAF Canberra B(I).8 XM264 is on display at the Flugausstellung Hermeskeil at Hermeskeil, Germany.

=== India ===
- A B(I)58 Canberra, serial IF907 is on display at the Indian Air Force Museum, Palam in Delhi, India; it is one of several diverted off an RAF contract as part of a 68 aircraft deal for India placed in January 1957.
- A Canberra (no model number given; might be a PR57 photo-reconnaissance aircraft) is on display at the HAL Heritage Centre and Aerospace Museum in Bangalore.
- A Canberra B(I)58, marked with serial IF908, is on display at the Shri Shivaji Preparatory Military School (SSPMS) in Pune. This is possibly former Royal New Zealand Air Force serial F1188, acquired by the Indian Air Force in November 1980.
- One more B(I)58 Canberra is preserved at Pune at the Lohegaon Air Station. Marked serial IF910, it is located on an active military base and is thus not open to the public.
- A Canberra T.4 marked IQ999 is on display at Cadet Hill in Deolali, Nashik.

=== Malta ===
- A Canberra T.4 (WT483) was shipped to Malta International Airport in 2010; it is intended to be displayed at the Malta Aviation Museum eventually.

=== New Zealand ===
- WT346 (Royal Air Force) is under static restoration to RNZAF B(I).12 configuration by the NZ Warbirds Association at Ardmore. Previously stored at the Air Force Museum of New Zealand.
- A84-207 (Royal Australian Air Force) (Australian-built GAF Canberra) is on display outside on a plinth at the National Transport & Toy Museum, Wānaka.
- A84-240 (Royal Australian Air Force) is on display at the Air Force Museum of New Zealand.

=== Norway ===
- Canberra T.17A WD955 "Echo Mike", gifted to Norsk Luftfartsmuseum and flown to Bodø in 1995. Stored in complete condition in the museum's hangar at Bodø MAS (not open to the public).

=== South Africa ===
- A Canberra T Mk.4 457 (71543) of the South African Air Force is displayed at the South African Air Force Museum, Swartkop Air Force Base, Pretoria.
- A Canberra T Mk.4 459 of the South African Air Force is plinthed at Air Force Base Waterkloof, Pretoria.

=== Sweden ===
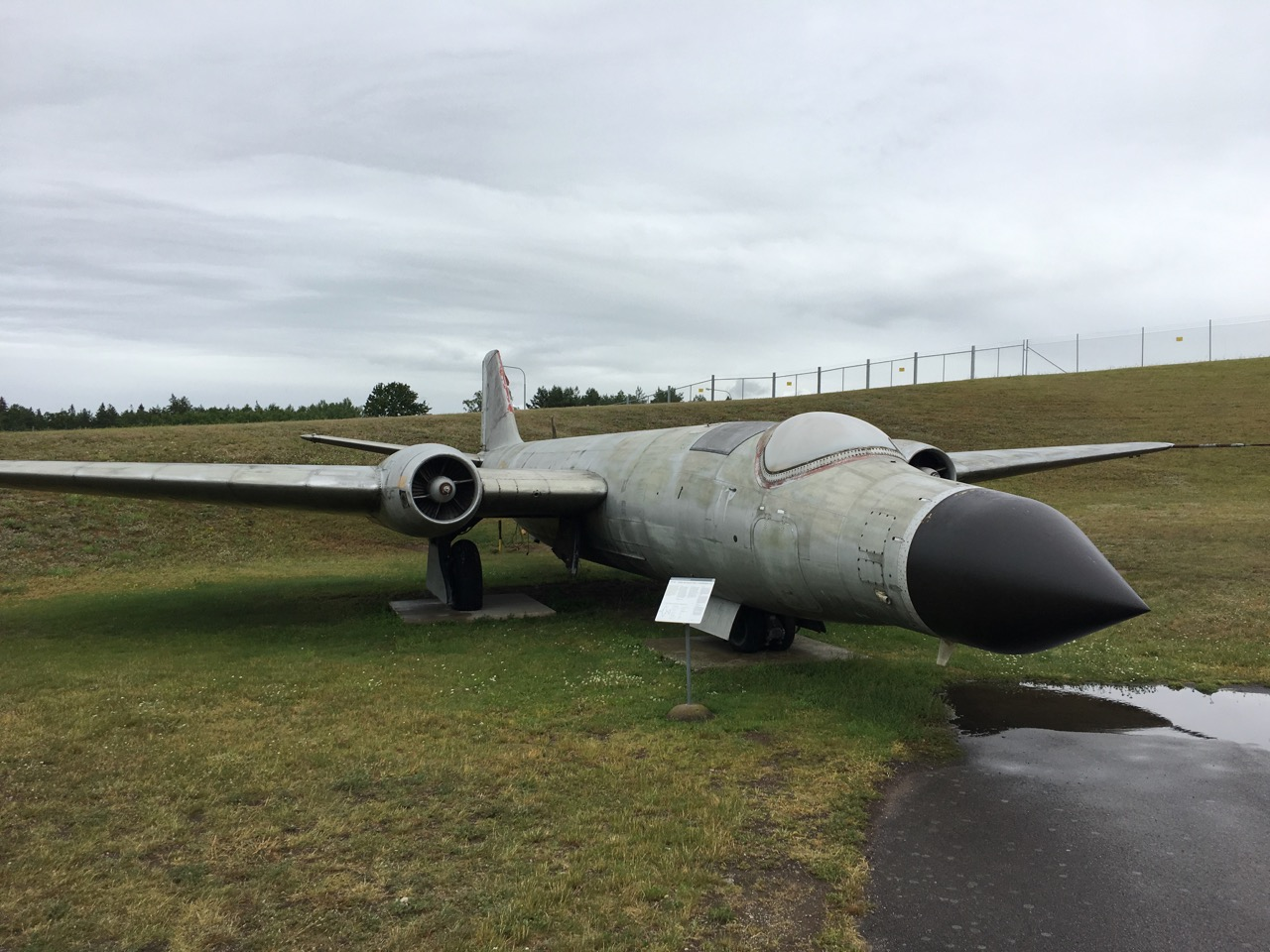
English Electric Canberra 52002 (Swedish Air Force Tp 52) on display at the Swedish Air Force Museum in Linköping (July 2019). The two Tp 52s were built as T.11s and secretly converted to the ELINT role in Sweden

- One Canberra TP52, modified for ELINT with a T.11 style nose is preserved at the Svedinos Museum, Ugglarp.
- The other Swedish Canberra was used for research and is on display at Swedish Air Force Museum in Linköping.

=== United Kingdom ===
- A B.2 Canberra (G-CTTS previously WK163) is located at Doncaster Sheffield Airport. In August 1957, WK163 broke the world altitude record when it flew to 70,310 ft. In July 2016, it was sold to Vulcan to the Sky Trust and is undergoing restoration to flightworthy condition, at which point it will be the only airworthy Canberra in Europe. To this end Canberra WT327 was purchased by the trust as a donor aircraft.
- A PR.3 Canberra (WF922) is on static display at the Midland Air Museum at Coventry Airport in the West Midlands. It was retired from the RAF in 1975. WF922 was fully restored by 1999.
- A PR.9 Canberra (XH171) is on display within the National Cold War Exhibition at the Royal Air Force Museum Midlands in Shropshire.
- A PR.9 Canberra (XH170) is on display as the gate guardian at RAF Wyton near Huntingdon, Cambridgeshire.
- A PR.9 Canberra (XH131) is on display at the Ulster Aviation Society at the Maze Long Kesh, Lisburn, Northern Ireland.
- A T.4 Canberra (WH846) is on static display at the Yorkshire Air Museum near York.
- A T.4 Canberra (WJ874) was on display at the Cornwall Aviation Heritage Centre outside Newquay, Cornwall. This museum is now closed and the aircraft was scheduled to be cut up but is now privately owned.
- A T.19 (WH904) and a modded B.2 (WV787) Canberra are on static display at Newark Air Museum in Nottinghamshire. A PR.7 (WH791) was previously displayed at, but not owned by, the museum and was scrapped in 2025.
- A PR.3 Canberra (WE139) is on display at the Royal Air Force Museum London.
- A B.2 Canberra (WH725) is on display at the Imperial War Museum Duxford in Cambridgeshire.
- A T.17 Canberra (WH740) is on static display at East Midlands Aeropark in Leicestershire.
- A TT.18 Canberra (WJ639) is on static display at the North East Land, Sea and Air Museums near Sunderland.
- A B(I)8 Canberra (WT333) on display as part of the Cold War Jets Collection, Bruntingthorpe, Leicestershire. It is being maintained to a serviceable condition and performs engine runs on open days.
- A T.4 Canberra (WE188) is on display at the Solway Aviation Museum, Carlisle Airport, Cumbria.

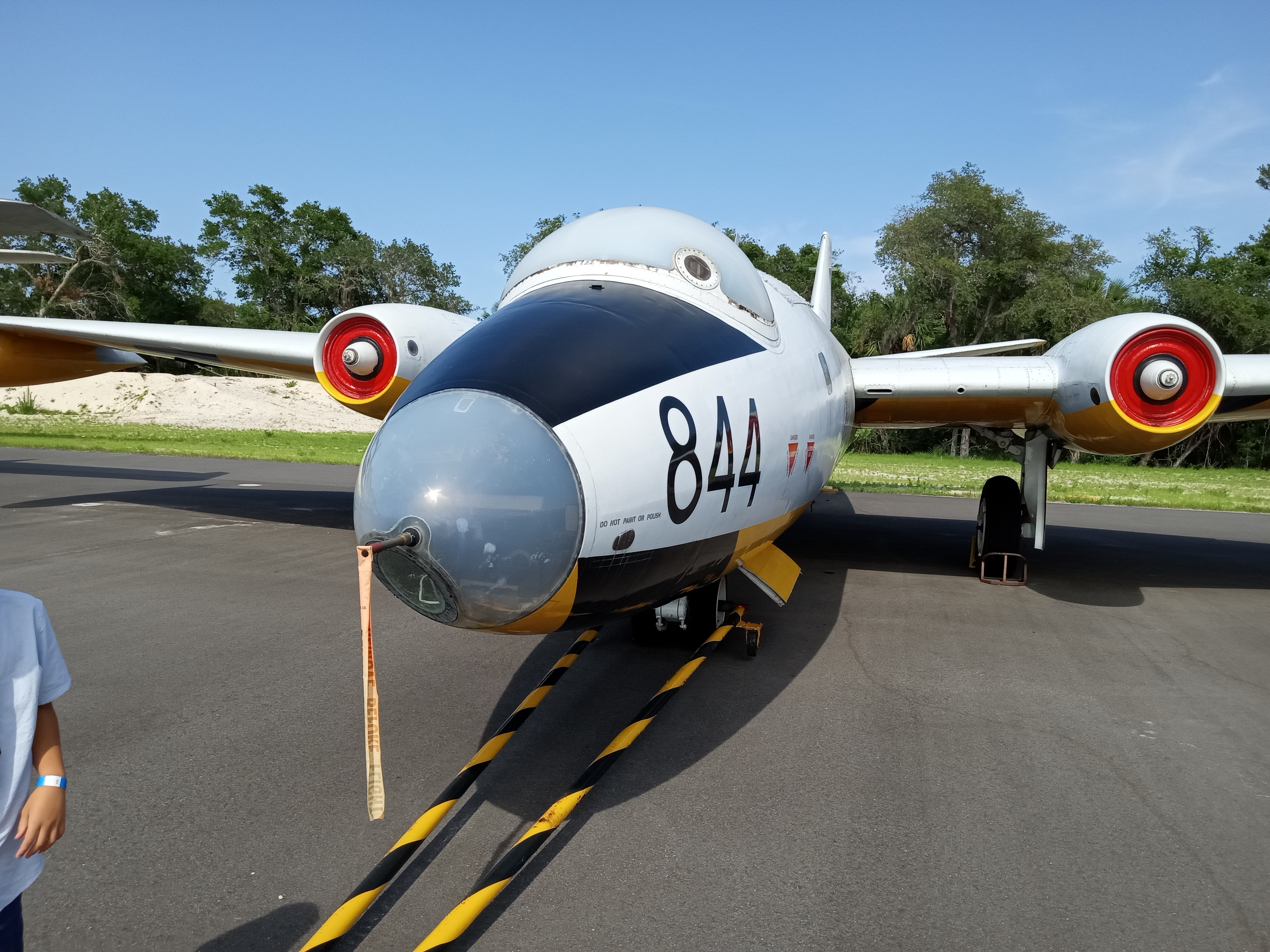
Canberra WJ574 on display at the Valiant Air Command Warbird Museum in Titusville, Florida.

=== United States ===
- Two British-built Canberras are registered to High Altitude Mapping Missions, Inc. of Spokane, Washington. These are N30UP, a Canberra B(I)8/B.2/6, originally operated as WT327, and N40UP, a Canberra B.6, originally operated as XH567.
- One British-built RAF Canberra B.2, subsequently converted to TT.18 (target tug) for use by the Fleet Air Arm is displayed outside at Airbase Arizona of the Commemorative Air Force at Falcon Field, Mesa, Arizona. This aircraft, originally WK142 in RAF and RN service, was sold in 1995 to an American buyer and carries N76764 as its US registration.
- One British-built RAF Canberra B.2, subsequently converted to a TT.18 target tug for use by the Fleet Air Arm is restored by the Valiant Air Command Warbird Museum in Titusville, Florida. This aircraft, WJ574, was involved in 'Project Robin' flying chase to the overflight Canberra tasked with photographing the Soviet Union's early V-2 rocket tests at Kapustin Yar.

=== Zimbabwe ===
- A Canberra can be seen on Google Earth at Robert Gabriel Mugabe International Airport. There were two here, but one was donated to the China Aviation Museum some time before 2015. As of March 2025, there is another aeroplane visible, about 1,700ft to the west of the first.

== Specifications (Canberra B(I).6) ==
English Electric Canberra 3-view drawing

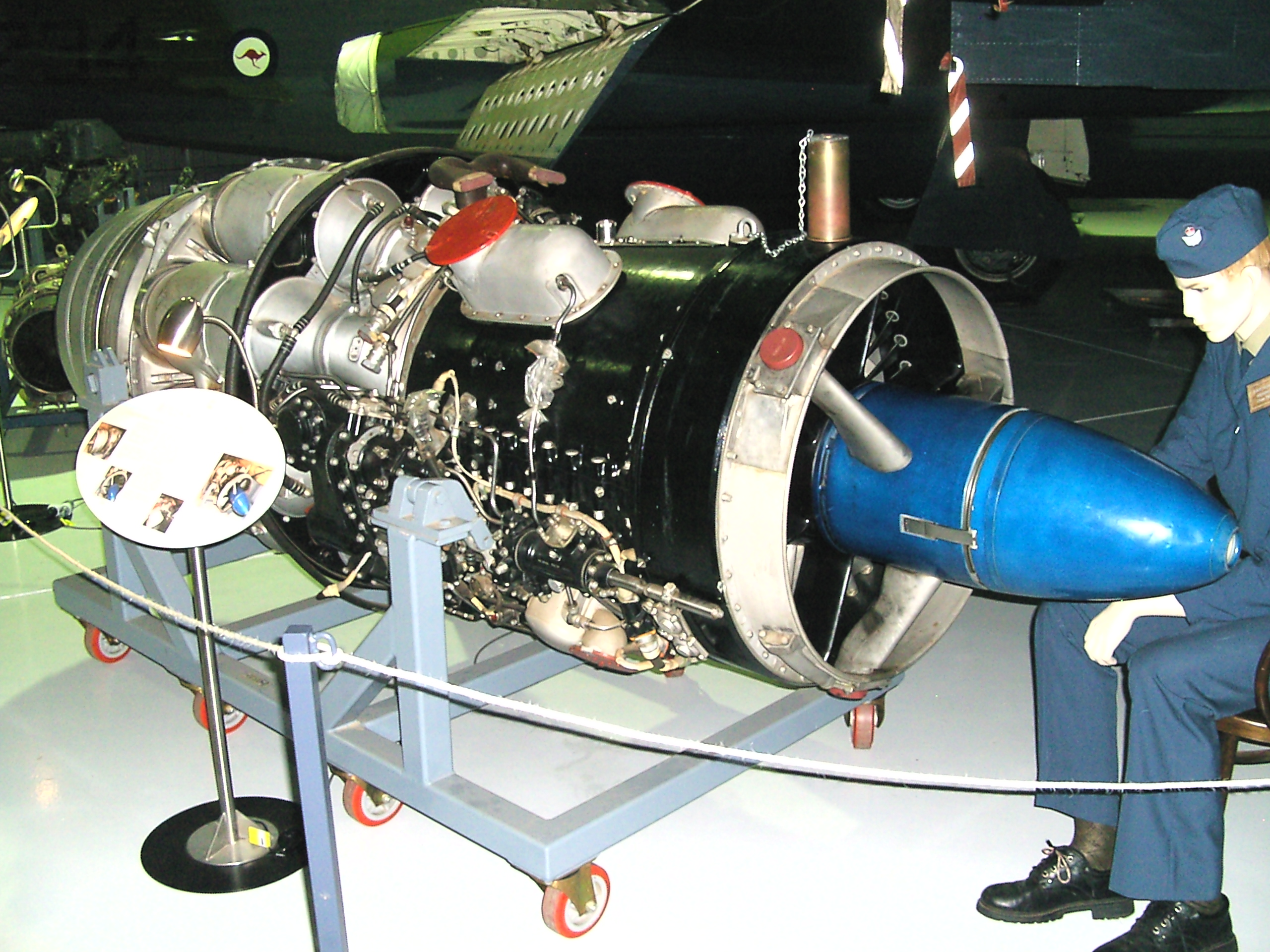
Rolls-Royce Avon engine on display, Temora Aviation Museum, 2011

Data from Combat Aircraft Recognition

General characteristics

- Crew: 3
- Length: 65 ft 6 in (19.96 m)
- Wingspan: 64 ft 0 in (19.51 m)
- Height: 15 ft 8 in (4.78 m)
- Wing area: 960 sq ft (89 m^{2})
- Airfoil: root: RAE/D 12% symm; tip: RAE/D 9% symm
- Empty weight: 21,650 lb (9,820 kg)
- Gross weight: 46,000 lb (20,865 kg)
- Max takeoff weight: 55,000 lb (24,948 kg)
- Powerplant: 2 × Rolls-Royce R.A.7 Avon Mk.109 turbojet engines, 7,400 lbf (33 kN) thrust each

Performance

- Maximum speed: 580 mph (930 km/h, 500 kn) at 40,000 ft (12,000 m)
- Maximum speed: Mach 0.88
- Combat range: 810 mi (1,300 km, 700 nmi)
- Ferry range: 3,380 mi (5,440 km, 2,940 nmi)
- Service ceiling: 48,000 ft (15,000 m)
- Rate of climb: 3,400 ft/min (17 m/s)
- Wing loading: 48 lb/sq ft (230 kg/m^{2})
- Thrust/weight: 0.37

Armament

- Guns: 4 × 20 mm Hispano Mk.V cannon mounted in rear bomb bay (500 rounds/gun), or 2 × 0.30 in (7.62 mm) machine gun pods
- Rockets: 2 × unguided rocket pods with 37 2-inch (51 mm) rockets, or 2 × Matra rocket pods with 18 SNEB 68 mm rockets each
- Missiles: A variety of missiles can be carried according to mission requirements, e.g: 2 × AS-30 air-to-surface missiles
- Bombs: Total of 8,000 lb (3,628 kg) of payload can be mounted inside the internal bomb bay and on two underwing hardpoints, with the ability to carry a variety of bombs.
  Typically, the internal bomb bay can hold up to 9 × 500 lb (227 kg) bombs, or 6 × 1,000 lb (454 kg) bombs, or 1 × 4,000 lb (1,814 kg) bomb; while the pylons can hold 4 × 500 lb (227 kg) bombs, or 2 × 1,000 lb (454 kg) bombs.

Nuclear weapons: in addition to conventional ordnance, the Canberra was also type-approved for tactical nuclear weapon delivery, including the Mk 7, B28 (Mod 2, 70 kiloton yield), B57 and B43 (as part of a joint program with the United States) plus the Red Beard and WE.177A (Mod A, 10 kiloton yield) nuclear bombs. All nuclear weapons were carried internally.

== See also ==
Related development

- Martin B-57 Canberra
- Martin RB-57D Canberra
- Martin/General Dynamics RB-57F Canberra

Aircraft of comparable role, configuration, and era

- Arado Ar 234
- Convair XB-46
- Ilyushin Il-28/Hong H-5
- Martin XB-51
- North American B-45 Tornado
- Sud-Ouest Vautour

Related lists

- List of aircraft of the Royal Australian Air Force
- List of aircraft of the Royal Air Force
- List of bomber aircraft
