= List of Royal Air Force aircraft squadrons =

Royal Air Force squadrons directory

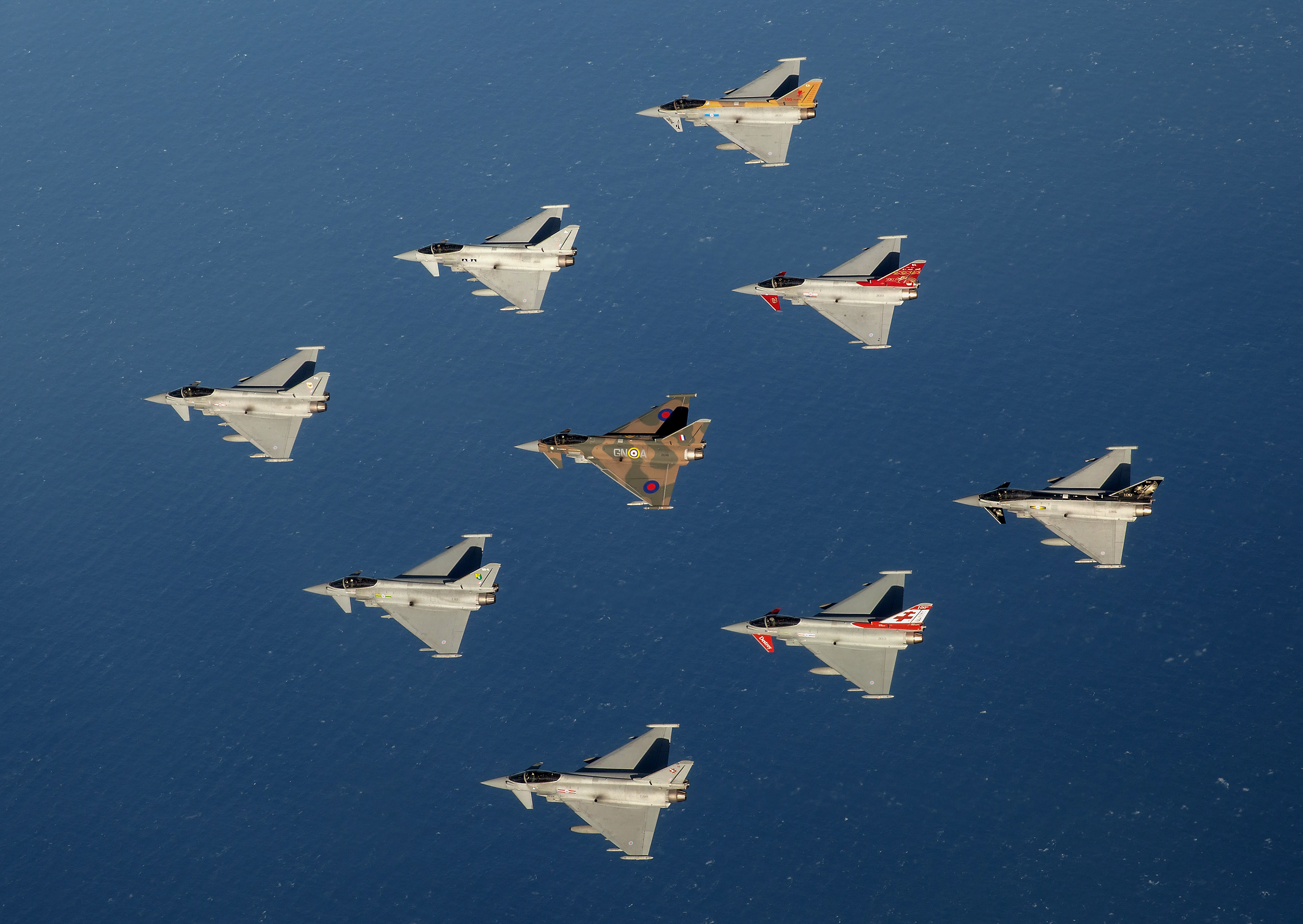
Typhoons representing the RAF Typhoon squadrons – 1 Sqn, 2 Sqn, 3 Sqn, 6 Sqn, 29 Sqn, 11 Sqn, 41 Sqn, 1435 Flight, and BOB75 in the centre to commemorate the Battle of Britain

Squadrons are the main form of flying unit of the Royal Air Force (RAF). These include Royal Flying Corps (RFC) and Royal Naval Air Service (RNAS) squadrons incorporated into the RAF when it was formed on 1 April 1918, during the First World War. Other squadrons of the RAF include those from Commonwealth air forces which have served within the RAF structure and squadrons of the Fleet Air Arm before it transferred to the Royal Navy in 1939.

Some squadrons have an individual tradition of presenting their squadron number in Roman numerals or using a suffix to their squadron number (such as "(F)" for "Fighter", "(B)" for "Bomber" or "(AC)" for "Army Co-operation") to indicate a past or present role. An example would be No. 18 (Bomber) Squadron RAF which currently actually operates the heavy-lift Chinook helicopter. However, these practices have, at least in the past, been deprecated at higher levels and generally only apply to certain squadrons with long traditions, especially those numbered from 1 to 20. Historical Squadrons can choose to 'lay up' their standards at RAF Cranwell or in places of worship following disbandment.

Flying training units and operational evaluation squadrons have generally been (Reserve) squadrons, although they are regular active-duty units. The policy of the (Reserve) numberplate was rescinded in February 2018, to coincide with the renaming of 22 (Training) Group to just 22 Group in line with other RAF Groups.

Some Squadron names include the location they were originally formed.

== Regular RFC, RNAS, and RAF squadrons (Nos. 1–299) ==
Squadrons in Bold Type are currently active

=== Nos. 1–50 ===
- No. 1 (Fighter) Squadron –Typhoon FGR4
- No. II (Army Cooperation) Squadron – Typhoon FGR4
- No. 3 (Fighter) Squadron – Typhoon FGR4
- No. IV Squadron – Hawk T2
- No. V (Army Cooperation) Squadron
- No. 6 Squadron – Typhoon FGR4
- No. 7 Squadron – Chinook HC5, HC6, HC6A
- No. VIII Squadron – E-7 Wedgetail
- No. IX (Bomber) Squadron – Typhoon FGR4
- No. 10 Squadron – Voyager KC2/KC3
- No. XI (Fighter) Squadron – Typhoon FGR4
- No. 12 Squadron (Joint UK Qatari Sqn) – Typhoon FGR4/T3
- No. 13 Squadron – Protector RG.1 (MQ-9B)
- No. 14 Squadron – Shadow R1/R1A
- No. XV Squadron
- No. 16 Squadron – Tutor T1
- No. XVII Test and Evaluation Squadron – F-35B Lightning (OEU)
- No. 18 Squadron – Chinook HC5, HC6, HC6A
- No. XIX Squadron – Control and Reporting Centre
- No. 20 Squadron – UK Air Surveillance and Control System (OCU)
- No. 21 Squadron
- No. XXII Squadron – Various helicopters (Joint Aviation Command OEU)
- No. 23 Squadron
- No. XXIV (Commonwealth) Squadron – C-17 Globemaster & Atlas C1 (OCU)
- No. XXV (Fighter) Squadron – Hawk T2
- No. 26 (South African) Squadron
- No. 27 Squadron – Chinook HC5, HC6, HC6A
- No. 28 (Army Cooperation) Squadron – Chinook HC5, HC6, HC6A OCU
- No. 29 Squadron – Typhoon FGR4/T3 (OCU)
- No. 30 Squadron – Atlas C1
- No. 31 Squadron – Protector RG.1 (MQ-9B)
- No. 32 (The Royal) Squadron – Envoy IV CC1 and AW109SP GrandNew
- No. 33 Squadron
- No. 34 Squadron
- No. 35 (Madras Presidency) Squadron
- No. 36 Squadron
- No. 37 Squadron
- No. 38 Squadron
- No. 39 Squadron
- No. 40 Squadron
- No. 41 Test and Evaluation Squadron – Typhoon FGR4/T3
- No. 42 (Torpedo Bomber) Squadron – Poseidon MRA1 and Wedgetail AEW1 (OCU)
- No. 43 (China-British) Squadron
- No. 44 (Rhodesia) Squadron
- No. 45 Squadron – Phenom T1
- No. 46 (Uganda) Squadron
- No. 47 Squadron
- No. 48 Squadron
- No. 49 Squadron
- No. 50 Squadron

=== Nos. 51–66 ===
- No. 51 Squadron – RC-135W Rivet Joint
- No. 52 Squadron
- No. 53 Squadron
- No. 54 Squadron – RC-135W Rivet Joint and Shadow R1/R1A (OCU)
- No. 55 Squadron
- No. 56 (Punjab) Squadron – Air C2ISR Test & Evaluation
- No. LVII Squadron – Prefect T1
- No. 58 Squadron
- No. 59 Squadron
- No. 60 Squadron – Juno HT1
- No. 61 Squadron
- No. 62 Squadron
- No. 63 Squadron
- No. 64 Squadron
- No. 65 (East India) Squadron
- No. 66 Squadron

=== Nos. 67–71 ===
During the First World War, in order to avoid confusion with similarly numbered British flying squadrons, units of the separate Australian Flying Corps were known for administrative purposes as 67, 68, 69, and 71 squadrons. Since the Second World War these numbers have always been used by RAF units.

However, the designation 70 (or LXX) Squadron has always been used for RFC/RAF units.

- No. 67 Squadron
  - 1916–18: No. 1 Squadron, Australian Flying Corps
  - From 1941: No. 67 Squadron
- No. 68 Squadron
  - 1916–18: No. 2 Squadron, Australian Flying Corps
  - From 1941: No. 68 Squadron
- No. 69 Squadron RAF
  - 1916–18: No. 3 Squadron Australian Flying Corps
  - From 1941: No. 69 Squadron
- No. LXX Squadron (Atlas C1)
- No. 71 Squadron
  - 1916–18: No. 4 Squadron Australian Flying Corps
  - From 1940: No. 71 Squadron (staffed by US volunteers in 1940–42)

=== Nos. 72–100 ===
- No. 72 (Basutoland) Squadron – Texan T1
- No. 73 Squadron
- No. 74 (Trinidad) Squadron
- No. 75 (New Zealand) Squadron
- No. 76 Squadron
- No. 77 Squadron
- No. 78 Squadron – London Area Control Centre
- No. 79 (Madras Presidency) Squadron
- No. 80 Squadron – Australia, Canada and United Kingdom Reprogramming Laboratory
- No. 81 Squadron
- No. 82 (United Provinces) Squadron
- No. 83 Squadron
- No. 84 Squadron – Puma HC2
- No. 85 Squadron
- No. 86 Squadron
- No. 87 (United Provinces) Squadron
- No. 88 (Hong Kong) Squadron
- No. 89 Squadron
- No. 90 Squadron
- No. 91 (Nigeria) Squadron
- No. 92 (East India) Squadron – Tactics and Training
- No. 93 Squadron
- No. 94 Squadron
- No. 95 Squadron
- No. 96 Squadron
- No. 97 (Straits Settlements) Squadron
- No. 98 Squadron
- No. 99 (Madras Presidency) Squadron – C-17 Globemaster
- No. 100 Squadron

=== Nos. 101–150 ===
- No. 101 Squadron – Voyager KC2/KC3
- No. 102 (Ceylon) Squadron
- No. 103 Squadron
- No. 104 Squadron
- No. 105 Squadron
- No. 106 Squadron
- No. 107 Squadron
- No. 108 Squadron
- No. 109 Squadron
- No. 110 (Hyderabad) Squadron
- No. 111 Squadron
- No. 112 Squadron
- No. 113 Squadron
- No. 114 (Hong Kong) Squadron
- No. 115 Squadron – Tutor T1
- No. 116 Squadron
- No. 117 Squadron
- No. 118 Squadron
- No. 119 Squadron
- No. 120 Squadron – Poseidon MRA1
- No. 121 (Eagle) Squadron later 335th Fighter Squadron USAAF
- No. 122 (Bombay) Squadron
- No. 123 (East India) Squadron
- No. 124 (Baroda) Squadron
- No. 125 (Newfoundland) Squadron
- No. 126 (Persian Gulf) Squadron
- No. 127 Squadron
- No. 128 Squadron
- No. 129 (Mysore) Squadron
- No. 130 (Punjab) Squadron
- No. 131 (County of Kent) Squadron
- No. 132 (City of Bombay) Squadron
- No. 133 (Eagle) Squadron
- No. 134 Squadron
- No. 135 Squadron
- No. 136 Squadron
- No. 137 Squadron
- No. 138 Squadron
- No. 139 (Jamaica) Squadron
- No. 140 Squadron
- No. 141 Squadron
- No. 142 Squadron
- No. 143 Squadron
- No. 144 Squadron
- No. 145 Squadron
- No. 146 Squadron
- No. 147 Squadron
- No. 148 Squadron
- No. 149 (East India) Squadron
- No. 150 Squadron

=== Nos. 151–200 ===
- No. 151 Squadron
- No. 152 (Hyderabad) Squadron
- No. 153 Squadron
- No. 154 (Motor Industries) Squadron
- No. 155 Squadron
- No. 156 Squadron
- No. 157 Squadron
- No. 158 Squadron
- No. 159 Squadron
- No. 160 Squadron
- No. 161 Squadron
- No. 162 Squadron
- No. 163 Squadron
- No. 164 (Argentine British) Squadron
- No. 165 (Ceylon) Squadron
- No. 166 Squadron
- No. 167 (Gold Coast) Squadron
- No. 168 Squadron
- No. 169 Squadron
- No. 170 Squadron
- No. 171 Squadron
- No. 172 Squadron
- No. 173 Squadron
- No. 174 (Mauritius) Squadron
- No. 175 Squadron
- No. 176 Squadron
- No. 177 Squadron
- No. 178 Squadron
- No. 179 Squadron
- No. 180 Squadron
- No. 181 Squadron
- No. 182 Squadron
- No. 183 (Gold Coast) Squadron
- No. 184 Squadron
- No. 185 Squadron
- No. 186 Squadron
- No. 187 Squadron
- No. 188 Squadron
- No. 189 Squadron
- No. 190 Squadron
- No. 191 Squadron
- No. 192 Squadron
- No. 193 (Fellowship of the Bellows) Squadron
- No. 194 Squadron
- No. 195 Squadron
- No. 196 Squadron
- No. 197 Squadron
- No. 198 Squadron
- No. 199 Squadron
- No. 200 Squadron

=== Nos. 201–250 ===
The first squadrons to carry numbers above 200 were former RNAS squadrons that were renumbered upon amalgamation with 200 added to their RNAS squadron number. Independent flights of the RNAS were grouped together in squadrons and given numbers in the 200 series.

- No. 201 Squadron – Poseidon MRA1
- No. 202 Squadron – Jupiter HT1
- No. 203 Squadron – Poseidon MRA1 and Wedgetail AEW1 line engineering
- No. 204 Squadron
- No. 205 Squadron
- No. 206 Squadron – Atlas C1 (OEU)
- No. 207 Squadron – F-35B Lightning (OCU)
- No. 208 Squadron
- No. 209 Squadron
- No. 210 Squadron
- No. 211 Squadron
- No. 212 Squadron
- No. 213 (Ceylon) Squadron
- No. 214 (Federated Malay States) Squadron
- No. 215 Squadron
- No. 216 Squadron – drone swarm technology testing
- No. 217 Squadron
- No. 218 (Gold Coast) Squadron
- No. 219 (Mysore) Squadron
- No. 220 Squadron
- No. 221 Squadron
- No. 222 (Natal) Squadron
- No. 223 Squadron
- No. 224 Squadron
- No. 225 Squadron
- No. 226 Squadron
- No. 227 Squadron
- No. 228 Squadron
- No. 229 Squadron
- No. 230 Squadron
- No. 231 Squadron
- No. 232 Squadron
- No. 233 Squadron
- No. 234 (Madras Presidency) Squadron
- No. 235 Squadron
- No. 236 Squadron
- No. 237 Squadron second formation as No. 237 (Rhodesia) from No. 1 Squadron Southern Rhodesian Air Force
- No. 238 Squadron
- No. 239 Squadron
- No. 240 Squadron
- No. 241 Squadron
- No. 242 (Canadian) Squadron
- No. 243 Squadron
- No. 244 Squadron
- No. 245 (Northern Rhodesia) Squadron
- No. 246 Squadron
- No. 247 (China-British) Squadron
- No. 248 Squadron
- No. 249 (Gold Coast) Squadron
- No. 250 (Sudan) Squadron

=== Nos. 251–299 ===
- No. 251 Squadron
- No. 252 Squadron
- No. 253 (Hyderabad State) Squadron
- No. 254 Squadron
- No. 255 Squadron
- No. 256 Squadron
- No. 257 (Burma) Squadron
- No. 258 Squadron
- No. 259 Squadron
- No. 260 Squadron
- No. 261 Squadron
- No. 262 Squadron
- No. 263 (Fellowship of the Bellows) Squadron
- No. 264 (Madras Presidency) Squadron
- No. 265 Squadron
- No. 266 (Rhodesia) Squadron
- No. 267 (Malta) Squadron
- No. 268 Squadron
- No. 269 Squadron
- No. 270 Squadron
- No. 271 Squadron
- No. 272 Squadron
- No. 273 Squadron
- No. 274 Squadron
- No. 275 Squadron
- No. 276 Squadron
- No. 277 Squadron
- No. 278 Squadron
- No. 279 Squadron
- No. 280 Squadron
- No. 281 Squadron
- No. 282 Squadron
- No. 283 Squadron
- No. 284 Squadron
- No. 285 Squadron
- No. 286 Squadron
- No. 287 Squadron
- No. 288 Squadron
- No. 289 Squadron
- No. 290 Squadron
- No. 291 Squadron
- No. 292 Squadron
- No. 293 Squadron
- No. 294 Squadron
- No. 295 Squadron
- No. 296 Squadron
- No. 297 Squadron
- No. 298 Squadron
- No. 299 Squadron

== Nos. 300–352 ==
Squadrons in the 300–352 series were staffed during the Second World War by volunteers from countries in occupied Europe. In some cases, these RAF squadrons and personnel were regarded by a relevant government-in-exile as serving concurrently with its air force.

Similarly, in 1940–42, three "Eagle Squadrons" were composed of volunteers from the US: No. 71 (Eagle) Squadron, later 334th Fighter Squadron USAAF; No. 121 (Eagle) Squadron, later 335th Fighter Squadron USAAF and No. 133 (Eagle) Squadron, later 336th Fighter Squadron USAAF.

=== Polish (300–309) ===
See also Squadrons Nos. 315–318, 663 and Polish Fighting Team (under Other)

- No. 300 "Land of Masovia" Polish Bomber Squadron (Ziemi Mazowieckiej)
- No. 301 "Land of Pomerania" Polish Bomber Squadron (Ziemi Pomorskiej)
- No. 302 "City of Poznań" Polish Fighter Squadron (Poznański)
- No. 303 "Kosciuszko" Polish Fighter Squadron (Warszawski im. Tadeusza Kościuszki)
- No. 304 "Land of Silesia" Polish Bomber Squadron (Ziemi Śląskiej im. Ks. Józefa Poniatowskiego)
- No. 305 "Land of Greater Poland" Polish Bomber Squadron (Ziemi Wielkopolskiej im. Marszałka Józefa Piłsudskiego)
- No. 306 "City of Toruń" Polish Fighter Squadron (Toruński)
- No. 307 "City of Lwów" Polish Fighter Squadron (Lwowskich Puchaczy)
- No. 308 "City of Kraków" Polish Fighter Squadron (Krakowski)
- No. 309 "Land of Czerwień" Polish Fighter-Reconnaissance Squadron (Ziemi Czerwieńskiej)

=== Czechoslovak (310–313) ===
- No. 310 (Czechoslovak) Squadron
- No. 311 (Czechoslovak) Squadron
- No. 312 (Czechoslovak) Squadron
- No. 313 (Czechoslovak) Squadron

(Note: the RAF has never had a flying unit named 314 Squadron, although it has used the number for No. 314 Technical Services Unit. A proposed 314 Squadron was allocated squadron code "UY" during the period April to September 1939, but was never formed.)

=== Polish (315–318) ===
See also Squadrons Nos. 300–309, 663 and Polish Fighting Team (under Other)

- No. 315 "City of Dęblin" Polish Fighter Squadron (Dębliński)
- No. 316 "City of Warsaw" Polish Fighter Squadron (Warszawski)
- No. 317 "City of Wilno" Polish Fighter Squadron (Wileński)
- No. 318 "City of Gdańsk" Polish Fighter-Reconnaissance Squadron (Gdański)

Note: the RAF never had a No. 319 Squadron; the "Polish Fighting Team" was attached to No. 145 Fighter Squadron. A proposed 319 Squadron was allocated squadron codes VE for the period April to September 1939. There was also 663 Artillery Observation Squadron; No. 138 Special Duty Squadron Polish Flight "C" and No. 1586 Polish Special Duty Flight.

=== Dutch (320–325) ===
- No. 320 (Netherlands) Squadron
- No. 321 (Netherlands) Squadron
- No. 322 (Dutch) Squadron

Note: Nos. 323 to 325 Squadrons were not formed, but allocated Squadron Codes GN, PQ and EA respectively for the period April to September 1939. However these numbers were used for post-war Royal Netherlands Air Force squadrons.

=== French (326–329) ===
See also Nos. 340–347 Squadron

- No. 326 (GC 2/7 Nice)
- No. 327 (GC 1/3 Corse)
- No. 328 (GC 1/7 Provence)
- No. 329 (GC 1/2 Cigognes)

=== Norwegian (330–334) ===
- No. 330 Squadron
- No. 331 Squadron
- No. 332 Squadron
- No. 333 Squadron
- No. 334 Squadron

=== Greek (335–339) ===
- No. 335 Squadron
- No. 336 Squadron

Note: Nos: 337–339 never formed, but were allocated Squadron Codes OK, ML and KN respectively for the period April to September 1939. The Royal Hellenic Air Force 13th Light Bomber Squadron was also under RAF command in World War II.

=== French (340–347) ===
See also Nos. 326–329 Squadron

- No. 340 (GC 4/2 Île-de-France)
- No. 341 (GC 3/2 Alsace)
- No. 342 (GB 1/20 Lorraine)
- No. 343 (Flotille 7E)
- No. 344 (Flotille 1E)
- No. 345 (GC 2/2 Berry)
- No. 346 (GB 2/23 Guyenne)
- No. 347 (GB 1/25 Tunisie)

Note: No. 348 Squadron was not formed, but Squadron codes letters FR were allocated for the period April to September 1939.

=== Belgian (349–350) ===
- No. 349 Squadron
- No. 350 Squadron

=== Yugoslavian (351–352) ===
- No. 351 (Jugoslav) Squadron
- No. 352 (Jugoslav) Squadron

== Nos. 353–361 ==
- No. 353 Squadron
- No. 354 Squadron
- No. 355 Squadron
- No. 356 Squadron
- No. 357 Squadron
- No. 358 Squadron
- No. 360 Squadron
- No. 361 Squadron

Note: Nos. 362–399 Squadrons were not formed.

== Article XV squadrons of World War II (Nos. 400–490) ==
Under Article XV of the British Commonwealth Air Training Plan, the air forces of Australia, Canada and New Zealand formed squadrons for service under RAF operational control. Most were new formations, however some had already existed prior to the creation of Article XV and had already been operational during the war, including combat operations.

=== Royal Canadian Air Force (400–443) ===
- 400 (City of Toronto)
- 401 (Ram)
- 402 (City of Winnipeg)
- 403 (Wolf)
- 404 (Buffalo)
- 405 (Vancouver)
- 406 (Lynx)
- 407 (Demon)
- 408 (Goose)
- 409 (Nighthawk)
- 410 (Cougar)
- 411 (Grizzly Bear)
- 412 (Falcon)
- 413 (Tusker)
- 414 (Sarnia Imperials)
- 415 (Swordfish)
- 416 (City of Oshawa)
- 417 (City of Windsor)
- 418 (City of Edmonton)
- 419 (Moose)
- 420 (Snowy Owl)
- 421 (Red Indian)
- 422 (Flying Yachtsman)
- 423 (Bald Eagle)
- 424 (Tiger)
- 425 (Alouette)
- 426 (Thunderbird)
- 427 (Lion)
- 428 (Ghost)
- 429 (Bison)
- 430 (City of Sudbury)
- 431 (Iroquois)
- 432 (Leaside)
- 433 (Porcupine)
- 434 (Bluenose)
- 435 (Chinthe)
- 436 (Elephant)
- 437 (Husky)
- 438 (Wildcat)
- 439 (Westmount)
- 440 (City of Ottawa and Beaver)
- 441 (Silver Fox)
- 442 (Caribou)
- 443 (Hornet)

Note: Although squadron numbers 444 to 449 were also reserved for the RCAF, it did not use them during the Second World War.

=== Royal Australian Air Force (450–467) ===
- No. 450 Squadron RAAF
- No. 451 Squadron RAAF
- No. 452 Squadron RAAF
- No. 453 Squadron RAAF
- No. 454 Squadron RAAF
- No. 455 Squadron RAAF
- No. 456 Squadron RAAF
- No. 457 Squadron RAAF
- No. 458 Squadron RAAF
- No. 459 Squadron RAAF
- No. 460 Squadron RAAF
- No. 461 Squadron RAAF
- No. 462 Squadron RAAF
- No. 463 Squadron RAAF
- No. 464 Squadron RAAF
- No. 466 Squadron RAAF
- No. 467 Squadron RAAF

Note: Although squadron numbers 465 and 468 to 479 were also reserved for the RAAF during the Second World War, it did not use them.

=== Royal New Zealand Air Force (485–490) ===
- No. 485 Squadron RNZAF
- No. 486 Squadron RNZAF
- No. 487 Squadron RNZAF
- No. 488 Squadron RNZAF
- No. 489 Squadron RNZAF
- No. 490 Squadron RNZAF

Note: Although the squadron numbers 491 to 499 were reserved for RNZAF units during the Second World War, no such squadrons were formed.

== Royal Auxiliary Air Force squadrons (Nos. 500–509) ==
Formed as "Special Reserve" squadrons but absorbed into the Royal Auxiliary Air Force

- No. 500 (County of Kent) Squadron
- No. 501 (County of Gloucester) Squadron
- No. 502 (Ulster) Squadron
- No. 503 (City of Lincoln) Squadron
- No. 504 (County of Nottingham) Squadron
- No. 505 (Wessex) Squadron

Note: No. 505, 506, 507, 508 and 509 Squadrons allocated Squadron codes YF, FS, GX, DY and BQ respectively for the period April to September 1939, but were never formed. A non-flying 505 Squadron was formed as a General Support Squadron in 2015.

== Regular RAF squadrons (Nos. 510–598) ==
- No. 510 Squadron
- No. 511 Squadron
- No. 512 Squadron
- No. 513 Squadron
- No. 514 Squadron
- No. 515 Squadron
- No. 516 Squadron
- No. 517 Squadron
- No. 518 Squadron
- No. 519 Squadron
- No. 520 Squadron
- No. 521 Squadron
- No. 524 Squadron
- No. 525 Squadron
- No. 526 Squadron
- No. 527 Squadron
- No. 528 Squadron
- No. 529 Squadron
- No. 530 Squadron
- No. 531 Squadron
- No. 532 Squadron
- No. 533 Squadron
- No. 534 Squadron
- No. 535 Squadron
- No. 536 Squadron
- No. 537 Squadron
- No. 538 Squadron
- No. 539 Squadron
- No. 540 Squadron
- No. 541 Squadron
- No. 542 Squadron
- No. 543 Squadron
- No. 544 Squadron
- No. 547 Squadron
- No. 548 Squadron
- No. 549 Squadron
- No. 550 Squadron
- No. 567 Squadron
- No. 569 Squadron
- No. 570 Squadron
- No. 571 Squadron
- No. 575 Squadron
- No. 576 Squadron
- No. 577 Squadron
- No. 578 Squadron
- No. 582 Squadron
- No. 586 Squadron
- No. 587 Squadron
- No. 595 Squadron
- No. 597 Squadron
- No. 598 Squadron

Note: No No. 599 Squadron seems to have been formed. There were to have been Reserve squadrons using numbers 551–566 which would have been created by adding 500 to existing Operational Training Unit designations. In the event the plan was never put into effect, although there was some desultory use of some of the numbers by some of the OTUs for a short period. Despite their lack of formal activation, this block of numbers has never been re-allocated for use by other units.

== Advanced Training Squadrons (550–565) ==
In the event of a German Invasion the Operational Training Units would have been re-formed into the Squadrons below, under plans as part of Operation Saracen, formulated in Spring 1940, which were later revised as Operation Banquet. Some reserve Squadron numbers were used by their respective OTU's during operational tasks until at least May 1944.

- No. 550 Squadron – Air Fighting Development Unit (Banquet)
- No. 551 Squadron – 51 Operational Training Unit (Saracen and Banquet)
- No. 552 Squadron – 51 Operational Training Unit (Saracen and Banquet)
- No. 553 Squadron – 53 Operational Training Unit (Saracen and Banquet)
- No. 554 Squadron – 53 Operational Training Unit (Saracen and Banquet)
- No. 555 Squadron – 55 Operational Training Unit (Saracen and Banquet)
- No. 556 Squadron – 56 Operational Training Unit (Saracen and Banquet)
- No. 557 Squadron – 57 Operational Training Unit (Saracen and Banquet)
- No. 558 Squadron – 58 Operational Training Unit (Saracen and Banquet)
- No. 559 Squadron – 59 Operational Training Unit (Saracen and Banquet)
- No. 560 Squadron – 56 Operational Training Unit (Banquet)
- No. 561 Squadron – 61 Operational Training Unit (Saracen and Banquet)
- No. 562 Squadron – 57 Operational Training Unit (Banquet)
- No. 563 Squadron – 58 Operational Training Unit (Banquet)
- No. 564 Squadron – 59 Operational Training Unit (Banquet)
- No. 565 Squadron – 61 Operational Training Unit (Banquet)

== Royal Auxiliary Air Force Squadrons (600–616) ==
- No. 600 (City of London) Squadron
- No. 601 (County of London) Squadron
- No. 602 (City of Glasgow) Squadron
- No. 603 (City of Edinburgh) Squadron
- No. 604 (County of Middlesex) Squadron
- No. 605 (County of Warwick) Squadron
- No. 606 (Chiltern) Squadron
- No. 607 (County of Durham) Squadron
- No. 608 (North Riding) Squadron
- No. 609 (West Riding) Squadron
- No. 610 (County of Chester) Squadron
- No. 611 (West Lancashire) Squadron
- No. 612 (County of Aberdeen) Squadron
- No. 613 (City of Manchester) Squadron
- No. 614 (County of Glamorgan) Squadron
- No. 614A Squadron
- No. 615 (County of Surrey) Squadron
- No. 616 (South Yorkshire) Squadron

Note: No. 606 Squadron RAF was allocated Squadron codes BG for the period April to September 1939, but was not formed. A non-flying No. 606 Helicopter Support Squadron of the RAuxAF was later formed in 1999.

== Regular RAF squadrons (Nos. 617–650) ==
- No. 617 Squadron (The Dambusters) ) – F-35B Lightning
- No. 618 Squadron
- No. 619 Squadron
- No. 620 Squadron
- No. 621 Squadron
- No. 622 Squadron now RAuxAF unit
- No. 623 Squadron
- No. 624 Squadron
- No. 625 Squadron
- No. 626 Squadron
- No. 627 Squadron
- No. 628 Squadron
- No. 630 Squadron
- No. 631 Squadron
- No. 635 Squadron
- No. 639 Squadron
- No. 640 Squadron
- No. 644 Squadron
- No. 650 Squadron

Note: Nos. 629, 632–634, 636–638, 641–643 and 645–649 were never formed, but some were allocated Squadron codes for the period April to September 1939 – 629 (LQ), 632 (LO), 636 (VZ), 637 (UK), 638 (PZ), 641 (EV), 645 (KF), 646 (YG), 647 (ZS), 648 (YT) and 649 (HA). However a fictional "633 Squadron" was featured in the eponymous novel and film. In addition, a fictional 641 Squadron featured in the film "Mosquito Squadron". Also, RAF Volunteer Gliding Squadrons (formerly Volunteer Gliding Schools until 2005) have been numbered in the range 611 to 671 since 1955.

== Air observation post squadrons ==
These squadrons were formed during the Second World War to perform artillery spotting and liaison roles, in co-operation with Army units. Most AOP squadron aircrew were provided by the Army. Nos. 661–664 and 666 Squadron were re-formed as Royal Auxiliary Air Force units in 1949. Nos. 651, 652 and 656 Squadron were transferred to the Army Air Corps in 1957.

- No. 651 (AOP) Squadron
- No. 652 (AOP) Squadron
- No. 653 (AOP) Squadron
- No. 654 (AOP) Squadron
- No. 655 (AOP) Squadron
- No. 656 (AOP) Squadron
- No. 657 (AOP) Squadron
- No. 658 (AOP) Squadron
- No. 659 (AOP) Squadron
- No. 660 (AOP) Squadron
- No. 661 (AOP) Squadron
- No. 662 (AOP) Squadron
- No. 663 (AOP) Squadron (Polish)
- No. 664 (AOP) Squadron RCAF (Canadian) – reformed in 1949 as No. 664 Squadron RAuxAF
- No. 665 (AOP) Squadron RCAF (Canadian)
- No. 666 (AOP) Squadron RCAF (Canadian) – reformed in 1949 as No. 666 Squadron RAuxAF

== Regular RAF squadrons (Nos. 667–695) ==
- No. 667 Squadron
- No. 668 Squadron
- No. 669 Squadron
- No. 670 Squadron
- No. 671 Squadron
- No. 672 Squadron
- No. 673 Squadron
- No. 679 Squadron
- No. 680 Squadron
- No. 681 Squadron
- No. 682 Squadron
- No. 683 Squadron
- No. 684 Squadron
- No. 691 Squadron
- No. 692 (Fellowship of the Bellows) Squadron
- No. 695 Squadron

Note: Nos. 693–694 and 696–699 Squadrons were never formed.

== Fleet Air Arm squadrons ==
While still under the control of the Royal Air Force, flights of the Fleet Air Arm (FAA) were organised into squadrons with numbers in the 700 and 800 range. The range 700 to 750 had been previously used for Fleet Air Arm Catapult Flight numbers.

- No. 712 Squadron
- No. 715 Squadron
- No. 718 Squadron
- No. 800 Squadron
- No. 801 Squadron
- No. 802 Squadron
- No. 803 Squadron
- No. 810 Squadron
- No. 811 Squadron
- No. 812 Squadron
- No. 813 Squadron
- No. 814 Squadron
- No. 820 Squadron
- No. 821 Squadron
- No. 822 Squadron
- No. 823 Squadron
- No. 824 Squadron
- No. 825 Squadron

These squadrons were transferred to the Royal Navy (RN) in 1939, becoming Royal Naval Air Squadrons (RNAS). The 700 and 800 range of squadron numbers continued to be used by the Royal Navy for newly formed Royal Naval Air Squadrons.

== Training Depot Stations ==
Training Depot Stations (TDS) were still in use after the formation of the Royal Air Force in 1918.

- No. 1 Training Depot Station (1917-19)
- No. 2 Training Depot Station (1917-18 & 1918-19)
- No. 3 Training Depot Station (1917-19)
- No. 4 Training Depot Station (1917-19)
- No. 5 Training Depot Station (1917-19)
- No. 6 Training Depot Station (1917-19)
- No. 7 Training Depot Station (1917-19)
- No. 8 Training Depot Station (1918-19)
- No. 9 Training Depot Station (1918-19)
- No. 10 Training Depot Station (1918-19)
- No. 11 Training Depot Station (1918-19)
- No. 12 Training Depot Station (1918-19)
- No. 13 Training Depot Station (1918-19)
- No. 14 Training Depot Station (1918-19)
- No. 15 Training Depot Station (1918-19)
- No. 16 Training Depot Station (1918-19)
- No. 17 Training Depot Station (1918-19)
- No. 18 Training Depot Station (1918-19)
- No. 19 Training Depot Station (1918-19)
- No. 20 Training Depot Station (1918-19)
- No. 21 Training Depot Station (1918-19)
- No. 22 Training Depot Station (1918-19)
- No. 23 Training Depot Station (1918-19)
- No. 24 Training Depot Station (1918-19)
- No. 25 Training Depot Station (1918-19)
- No. 26 Training Depot Station (1918-19)
- No. 27 Training Depot Station (1918-19)
- No. 28 Training Depot Station (1918-19)
- No. 29 Training Depot Station (1918-19)
- No. 30 Training Depot Station (1918-19)
- No. 31 Training Depot Station (1918-19)
- No. 32 Training Depot Station (1918-19)
- No. 33 Training Depot Station (1918-19)
- No. 34 Training Depot Station (1918-19)
- No. 35 Training Depot Station (1918-19)
- No. 36 Training Depot Station (1918-19)
- No. 37 Training Depot Station (1918-19)
- No. 38 Training Depot Station (1918-19)
- No. 39 Training Depot Station (1918-19)
- No. 40 Training Depot Station (1918-19)
- No. 41 Training Depot Station (1918-19)
- No. 42 Training Depot Station (1918-19)
- No. 43 Training Depot Station (1918-19)
- No. 44 Training Depot Station (1918-19)
- No. 45 Training Depot Station (1918-19)
- No. 46 Training Depot Station (1918-19)
- No. 47 Training Depot Station (1918-19)
- No. 48 Training Depot Station (1918-19)
- No. 49 Training Depot Station (1918-19)
- No. 50 Training Depot Station (1918-19)
- No. 51 Training Depot Station (1918-19)
- No. 52 Training Depot Station (1918-19)
- No. 53 Training Depot Station (1918-19)
- No. 54 Training Depot Station (1918-19)
- No. 55 Training Depot Station (1918-19)
- No. 56 Training Depot Station (1918-19)
- No. 57 Training Depot Station (1918-19)
- No. 58 Training Depot Station (1918-19)
- No. 59 Training Depot Station (1918-19)
- No. 60 Training Depot Station (1918-19)
- No. 61 Training Depot Station (1918-19)
- No. 98 Depot Squadron (1917)
- No. 99 Depot Squadron (1917)
- No. 190 (Depot) Squadron (1917)
- No. 191 (Depot) Squadron (1917)
- No. 192 (Depot) Squadron (1917)
- No. 198 (Depot) Squadron (1917 - ?)
- No. 199 (Depot) Squadron (1917-18)
- No. 201 Training Depot Station (1918 & 191-19)
- No. 202 Training Depot Station (1918)
- No. 203 Training Depot Station (1918)
- No. 204 Training Depot Station (1918-19)
- No. 205 Training Depot Station (1918)
- No. 206 Training Depot Station (1918)
- No. 207 Training Depot Station (1918)
- No. 208 Training Depot Station (1918)
- No. 209 (Seaplane) Training Depot Station (1918-19)
- No. 210 Training Depot Station (1918-19)
- No. 211 Training Depot Station (1918)
- No. 212 Training Depot Station (1918)
- No. 213 Training Depot Station (1918)

== University Air Squadrons ==
The majority of Universities in the United Kingdom are, or have been, represented by Royal Air Force (RAF) University Air Squadrons (UAS), where under-graduates can sample elements of the Royal Air Force, and learn to fly, as well as take advantage of scholarship schemes. Previously operating the Bulldog T.1, they now all currently operate the Tutor T.1. Although each UAS retain their own identity an activities, when two are co-located at the same airfield, such as Cambridge UAS and London UAS at RAF Wittering, and Liverpool UAS and Manchester and Salford UAS at RAF Woodvale, the two individual UAS share the same fleet of aircraft. All University Air Squadrons are currently commanded by No. 6 Flying Training School RAF (6FTS).

Squadrons below listed in bold are currently active, others are disbanded, or otherwise amalgamated into a current existing UAS.

- Aberdeen University Air Squadron
- Aberystwyth University Air Squadron
- Aberdeen, Dundee and St. Andrews University Air Squadron
- Belfast University Air Squadron
- **University of Birmingham Air Squadron** – RAF Cosford
- **Bristol University Air Squadron** – MOD Boscombe Down
- **Cambridge University Air Squadron** – RAF Wittering
- Cardiff University Air Squadron
- Derby University Air Squadron
- Durham University Air Squadron
- East Lowlands University Air Squadron
- **East Midlands Universities Air Squadron** – RAFC Cranwell
- **East of Scotland Universities Air Squadron** – Glasgow Airport
- Edinburgh University Air Squadron
- Exeter University Air Squadron
- Glasgow University Air Squadron
- **Universities of Glasgow and Strathclyde Air Squadron** – Leuchars Station
- Hull University Air Squadron
- Leeds University Air Squadron
- **Liverpool University Air Squadron** – RAF Woodvale
- **University of London Air Squadron** – RAF Wittering
- **Manchester and Salford Universities Air Squadron** – RAF Woodvale
- **Northern Ireland Universities Air Squadron** – Aldergrove Flying Station
- **Northumbrian Universities Air Squadron** – RAF Leeming
- Nottingham University Air Squadron
- **Oxford University Air Squadron** – RAF Benson
- Perth University Air Squadron
- Queen's University Air Squadron
- St. Andrews University Air Squadron
- St. Andrews and Dundee Universities Air Squadron
- **Southampton University Air Squadron** – MOD Boscombe Down
- Swansea University Air Squadron
- **Universities of Wales Air Squadron** – MOD St Athan
- Wolverhampton University Air Squadron
- Yatesbury University Air Squadron
- **Yorkshire Universities Air Squadron** – RAF Linton-on-Ouse

== Air Experience Flights ==
Air Experience Flights are co-located with University Air Squadrons and operate the Tutor T1 training aircraft.

- No. 1 Air Experience Flight
- No. 2 Air Experience Flight
- No. 3 Air Experience Flight
- No. 4 Air Experience Flight
- No. 5 Air Experience Flight
- No. 6 Air Experience Flight
- No. 7 Air Experience Flight
- No. 8 Air Experience Flight
- No. 9 Air Experience Flight
- No. 10 Air Experience Flight
- No. 11 Air Experience Flight
- No. 12 Air Experience Flight
- No. 13 Air Experience Flight

== Volunteer Gliding Squadrons ==
Initially formed as Gliding Schools (GS), and then renamed Volunteer Gliding Schools (VGS), these squadrons retained their gliding school numbers when reformed as squadrons. Conflicts with the main squadron numbers resolved by the VGS suffix. The currently active squadrons, now part of 2 Flying Training School (2FTS) headquartered at RAF Syerston along with the Central Gliding School, all operate the Viking T1 winch-launched sailplane glider.

- 611 Volunteer Gliding Squadron formerly 102 GS – (RAF Honington)
- 612 Volunteer Gliding Squadron formerly 104 GS
- 613 Volunteer Gliding Squadron formerly 122 GS
- 614 Volunteer Gliding Squadron formerly 142 GS, 146 GS and 147 GS
- 615 Volunteer Gliding Squadron formerly 141 GS and 168 GS – (RAF Kenley)
- 616 Volunteer Gliding Squadron formerly 106 GS
- 617 Volunteer Gliding Squadron
- 618 Volunteer Gliding Squadron formerly 146 GS and 168 GS
- 621 Volunteer Gliding Squadron – (RAF Little Rissington)
- 622 Volunteer Gliding Squadron formerly 89 GS – (Upavon Airfield)
- 624 Volunteer Gliding Squadron formerly 84 GS
- 625 Volunteer Gliding Squadron formerly 83 GS
- 626 Volunteer Gliding Squadron formerly 82 GS – (RNAS Predannack)
- 631 Volunteer Gliding Squadron formerly 186 GS – (RAF Woodvale)
- 632 Volunteer Gliding Squadron formerly 45 GS – (RAF Ternhill)
- 633 Volunteer Gliding Squadron
- 634 Volunteer Gliding Squadron formerly 68 GS
- 635 Volunteer Gliding Squadron
- 636 Volunteer Gliding Squadron
- 637 Volunteer Gliding Squadron – (RAF Little Rissington)
- 642 Volunteer Gliding Squadron formerly 23 GS
- 643 Volunteer Gliding Squadron formerly 107 EGS (merged with 644 VGS)
- 644 Volunteer Gliding Squadron formerly 29 EGS – (RAF Syerston)
- 645 Volunteer Gliding Squadron formerly 26 GS – (RAF Topcliffe)
- 661 Volunteer Gliding Squadron formerly 1 EGS – (RAF Kirknewton)
- 662 Volunteer Gliding Squadron formerly 2 GS and 5 GS
- 663 Volunteer Gliding Squadron
- 664 Volunteer Gliding Squadron

== Independent Flights ==
The Royal Air Force (RAF) maintains a number of independent flights; some on a permanent basis, others on an ad-hoc basis as required. Historically, some flights were alphabetically named. For a full list, see the list of Royal Air Force aircraft independent flights. Bold listings are currently active RAF flights.

- Battle of Britain Memorial Flight (BBMF) – at RAF Coningsby – 6x Spitfire (various marks), 2x Hurricane, 1x Lancaster, 1x Dakota, 2x Chipmunk T10
- No. 1310 Flight – 2x Chinook HC5, HC6, HC6A
- No. 1312 Flight – at RAF Mount Pleasant – 1x Voyager KC2, 1x Atlas C1
- No. 1435 Flight – at RAF Mount Pleasant – 4x Typhoon FGR4

== Dormant Squadrons ==
RAF College Cranwell stores some Standards for disbanded Squadrons that have the potential to be re-activated in the future, preserving the heritage of historic units. Once a Squadron Standard is 'laid up' in a place of worship, upon the disbandment of the Squadron, that Standard can no longer be reactivated. Many UK churches have Standards from the RAF following a service of Disbandment. However, some Squadrons choose to lay up their Standards in College Hall at RAF Cranwell, the spiritual home of the RAF, and may be reactivated as active Squadrons in the future. Old disbanded squadrons that have laid up their Standards can be presented new Standards to reactivate them, but this is currently extremely rare.

Squadron Standards (and their last operated aircraft) that are on display in the College Hall Rotunda in order of seniority are:

- No. 47 Squadron – Hercules C4/5
- No. V (Army Cooperation) Squadron – Sentinel R1
- No. 100 Squadron – Hawk T1
- No. 39 Squadron – MQ-9A Reaper
- No. XV Squadron – Tornado GR4
- No. 203 Squadron – Sea King HAR3
- No. 50 Squadron – Vulcan B.2/K.2
- No. 44 Squadron – Vulcan B.2
- No. 3 Squadron RAF Regiment
- No. 58 Squadron RAF Regiment

== Other Squadrons ==
The Royal Air force and Royal Flying Corps has always comprised a certain number of non-numbered Squadrons to fulfil special duties, experimental or one-off tasks.

- Air Command Southeast Asia (Internal Air Service) Squadron (1945–46)
- Air Council Inspection Squadron (1918–1920) – became No. 24 Squadron
- Air Despatch Letter Service Squadron (1944–46)
- Air Training Squadron (1971–72) – became No. 240 Operational Conversion Unit
- All-Weather Development Squadron (1956–59)
- Andover Training Squadron (1983–93)
- Antler Squadron (1956–1957) became No. 1321 Lincoln Conversion Flight
- Arrow Squadron (1956–1957) became No. 1321 Lincoln Conversion Flight
- Artillery Co-operation Squadron (1917–20) became School of Army Co-operation
- Auxiliary Fighter Squadron (Malaya) (1950) became Penang Fighter Squadron
- Auxiliary Fighter Squadron (Singapore) (1950–51) became Singapore Fighter Squadron
- B-29 Training Squadron (1950) became Washington Conversion Unit
- Burmese Conversion Squadron (1952-?)
- Composite Fighting Squadron RFC (1917)
- Composite Royal Naval Air service/Royal Flying Corps Squadron (1916)
- Communications Electronics Basic Training Squadron
- Demonstration Squadron (1918-?)
- Development Squadron, Gosport (1918) became No. 186 Squadron
- Elementary Flying Training Squadron (1987-?) became Joint Elementary Flying Training School
- Experimental Armament Squadron (1916–20)
- Far East Air Force Examining Squadron (1950–51) became Far East Air Force Training Squadron
- Far East Air Force Training Squadron (1951–55)
- Ferry Squadron (1958)
- Ferry Support Squadron (1956–1958) became Ferry Squadron
- Floatplane Training Squadron (1939–1940)
- Flying Selection Squadron (1979–1987) became Elementary Flying Training Squadron
- Glider Exercise Squadron (1941–42) became No. 296 Squadron
- Glider Training Squadron (1940) became No. 1 and No. 2 Glider Training School
- Ground Controlled Approach Squadron (1944–46)
- Guided Weapons Development Squadron (1957–59) became Guided Weapons Trials Squadron
- No. 1 Guided Weapons Trials Squadron (1959–62) became Fighter Command Missile Practice Camp
- Headquarters Service Ferry Pools/Squadron (1940–1941)
- Home Defence Squadron (1916) became No. 16 (Home Defence) Wing
- Hong Kong Auxiliary Squadron (1950–53) became Hong Kong Fighter Squadron
- Hong Kong Fighter Squadron (1953)
- Javelin Instrument Rating Squadron (1957–66)
- Joint Trials and Training Squadron (1966) became No. 360 Squadron
- Kuala Lumpur Fighter Squadron (1950–1952) became Kuala Lumpur Squadron
- Kuala Lumpur Squadron (1952-?)
- Low Level and Air Defence Training Squadron (No. 6 Flying Training School)
- Low Flying Operations Squadron
- Multi-Engine Training Squadron (See No. 6 Flying Training School) (1977–92) became No. 45 Squadron
- Nimrod Line Squadron
- Parachute Exercise Squadron (1941–42) became No. 297 Squadron
- Penang Squadron (1950–1951 & 1955–58) became Penang Fighter Squadron
- Penang Fighter Squadron (1951–55) became Penang Squadron
- Radar Research Squadron (1977–88)
- Refresher Flying Squadron (1977–84) became Refresher Flying Flight
- Reserve Training Squadron (1952–53)
- Royal Air Force College Air Squadron (1992–95)
- Royal Naval Fighter Squadron (1941–42)
- Seaplane Squadron, Alexandria
- Seaplane Squadron, Port Said
- Seaplane Training Squadron (1931–41)
- Sentry Training Squadron (1990–96) became No. 23 Squadron
- Service Ferry Squadron (1940–41)
- Service Ferry Training Squadron (1941) became Ferry Training Unit
- Signals Command Development Squadron (??-1962)
- Signals Squadron (1942) became No. 162 Squadron
- Singapore Squadron (1955–60)
- Special Transport Squadron (1949–50) became Special Communication Squadron
- No. 1 Torpedo Training Squadron (1918) became No. 201 Training Depot Station
- Training Squadron, Sylt (1946–48)
- Western Union Examining Squadron (1950–51)
- No. 1435 Squadron (1942–45)
- 'B' Squadron (1920) became No. 1 Squadron
- 'B' Squadron, Aegean (1918) became No. 223 Squadron
- 'C' Squadron, Aegean (1918) became No. 220 Squadron
- 'D' Squadron, Aegean (1918) became No. 221 Squadron
- 'S' Squadron (1915 & 1939–40) became No. 244 Squadron
- 'T' Squadron, Egypt (1919)
- 'X' (Canadian) Reserve Squadron (1917)
- 'X' Squadron (1943) became No. 617 Squadron
- 'X' Squadron, Egypt (1919)
- 'Y' (Canadian) Reserve Squadron (1917)
- 'Y' Squadron, Egypt – See No. 4 Flying Training School (1919)
- 'Y' Squadron, Iraq – See No. 4 Flying Training School (1940)
- 'Z' Squadron, Aegean (1918) became No. 222 Squadron
- 'Z' Squadron, Egypt (1919)

=== Communication Squadrons ===
To allow rapid transport of Air Officers, staff and other important people many units and Headquarters operated communication Sections, Flights, Squadrons or wings.

== Squadron codes ==
Most units of the Royal Air Force are identified by alphabetical (or similar) characters, known as a "squadron code", that is painted on all aircraft belonging to that unit. When individual units are assigned unusually large numbers of aircraft, multiple squadron codes have been used.

Other air forces, especially those from other Commonwealth countries, have often used similar systems of identification. During the Second World War, when units from other air forces were attached to the RAF – such as the Article XV squadrons (also known as "400 series squadrons") – their squadron codes were often changed, to avoid confusion with RAF units.

Historically, the codes have usually been two letters of the alphabet, painted on the rear fuselage next to the RAF roundel. These formed a suffix or prefix to the call sign of each aircraft (on the other side of the roundel) which was usually a single letter (e. g. "G for George"). In general, when an aircraft is lost or withdrawn from use, its call sign has been applied to its replacement or another aircraft.

== See also ==
Royal Air Force

- List of Royal Air Force aircraft squadrons
- List of Royal Air Force aircraft independent flights
- List of conversion units of the Royal Air Force
- List of Royal Air Force Glider units
- List of Royal Air Force Operational Training Units
- List of Royal Air Force schools
- List of Royal Air Force units & establishments
- List of RAF squadron codes
- List of RAF Regiment units
- List of Battle of Britain squadrons
- List of wings of the Royal Air Force
- Royal Air Force roundels

Army Air Corps

- List of Army Air Corps aircraft units

Fleet Air Arm

- List of Fleet Air Arm aircraft squadrons
- List of Fleet Air Arm groups
- List of aircraft units of the Royal Navy
- List of aircraft wings of the Royal Navy

Others

- List of Air Training Corps squadrons
- University Air Squadron
- Air Experience Flight
- Volunteer Gliding Squadron
- United Kingdom military aircraft registration mark
- United Kingdom aircraft test serials
- British military aircraft designation systems
