= RAF Witchford =

Former Royal Air Force station in Cambridgeshire, England

RAF Witchford
- Near Witchford, Cambridgeshire in England

Site information
- Type: Royal Air Force satellite station
- Code: EL
- Owner: Air Ministry
- Operator: Royal Air Force
- Controlled by: RAF Bomber Command * No. 3 Group RAF

Location
- Shown within Cambridgeshire RAF Witchford (the United Kingdom)
- Coordinates: 52°22′52″N 000°13′51″E

Site history
- Built: 1942/43
- In use: June 1943 - March 1946
- Battles/wars: European theatre of World War II

Airfield information
- Elevation: 14 metres (46 ft) AMSL
Runways
Direction	Length and surface
04/22	Asphalt
10/28	Asphalt
16/34	Asphalt

Royal Air Force Witchford, or more simply RAF Witchford, is a former Royal Air Force satellite station about 2 miles (3 km) southwest of Ely, Cambridgeshire, England and 13 miles (21 km) north of Cambridge, Cambridgeshire.

== History ==
Units:

- No. 115 Squadron RAF first started using RAF Witchford from 26 November 1943 with the Avro Lancaster II before changing to the Mk I and III Lancasters in March 1944 before moving to RAF Graveley on 10 September 1945
- No. 195 Squadron RAF reformed at the airfield on 1 October 1944 with the Lancaster I and III before moving to RAF Wratting Common on 13 November 1944 where the squadron disbanded on 14 August 1945
- No. 196 Squadron RAF started using the airfield on 19 Jul 1943 with the Vickers Wellington X until these were replaced with the Short Stirling III during their stay. The squadron left on 18 November 1943 moving to RAF Leicester East
- No. 513 Squadron RAF formed at Witchford on 15 September 1943 with the Stirling III before disbanding on 21 November 1943 at the airfield
- No. 29 Air Crew Holding Unit between October 1945 and March 1946
- An element of No. 3 Lancaster Finishing School RAF between May and July 1944

A total of 99 bombers despatched on operations from Witchford were lost, 8 being Stirlings and 91 Lancasters.

RAF Witchford was at first included among the initial sites for the Project Emily deployment of PGM-17 Thor intermediate range ballistic missiles, at the instigation of the Americans in 1958, but the land was owned by the Church Commissioners, and nearby RAF Mepal was substituted. The main selection criterion was the condition of the road network connecting the bases; a grade of more than one in seventeen was considered an unacceptable risk of grounding the missile transport.

== Current use ==
Most of the site is now the Lancaster Way Business Park, with the rest used for farming.

== See also ==
- List of former Royal Air Force stations
