= Liverpool University Air Squadron =

University flying squadron of the Royal Air Force

- LUAS badge
- Active: 13 January 1941–present
- Country: United Kingdom
- Branch: Royal Air Force
- Role: Officer Training, Ab Initio Flying Training, Recruiting
- Part of: No. 6 Flying Training School RAF
- Garrison/HQ: RAF Woodvale
- Nickname: LUAS
- Mottos: Latin: Studiis Divisi Volando Sociati "By Studies they be divided, yet by flying they are united"

Commanders
- OC LUAS: Squadron Leader A Jenkins
- Notable commanders: Air Marshal Edward Stringer

Aircraft flown
- Trainer: Grob Tutor T1

Liverpool University Air Squadron (LUAS /luˈæs/) is a training unit of the Royal Air Force which provides basic flying training, adventurous training and personal development skills to undergraduate students of the University of Liverpool, University of Lancaster, Edge Hill University, Bangor University and Liverpool John Moores University.

== History ==
Liverpool University Air Squadron (LUAS) was established on 12 January 1941 and initially operated from RAF Speke during the Second World War. It was disbanded on 30 June 1946 following the end of hostilities.

The squadron was reformed on 1 December 1950 at RAF Hooton Park, before relocating to RAF Woodvale on 13 July 1951, which remains its current base.

Throughout its history, LUAS has operated a variety of training aircraft. The de Havilland DH.82 Tiger Moth was used between 1941 and 1952, followed by the de Havilland Chipmunk from 1952 to 1975. The Scottish Aviation Bulldog replaced the Chipmunk in 1975.

Since 1999, the squadron has been equipped with the Grob 115 Tutor, which continues to serve as its primary training aircraft.

== Rationale ==
The University Air Squadrons are a training program designed for prospective RAF officers to experience air service prior to joining the RAF. UAS training can offer a direct stream for its student pilots to RAF programs. Students participating in UAS are not obliged to enter into the RAF, unless a bursary has been awarded to them by the OASC. LUAS is parented by RAF Woodvale where it flies Grob Tutor aircraft.

== Flight Training ==
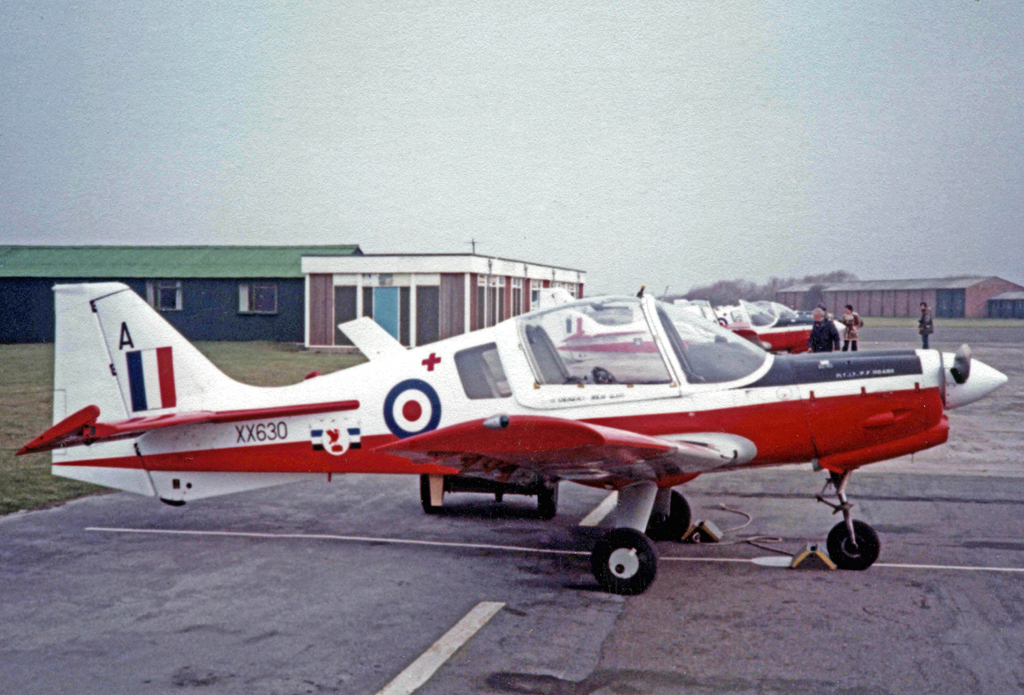
Liverpool UAS Bulldog T.1 wearing the unit's Liver Bird emblem on its rear fuselage, at RAF Woodvale in 1983

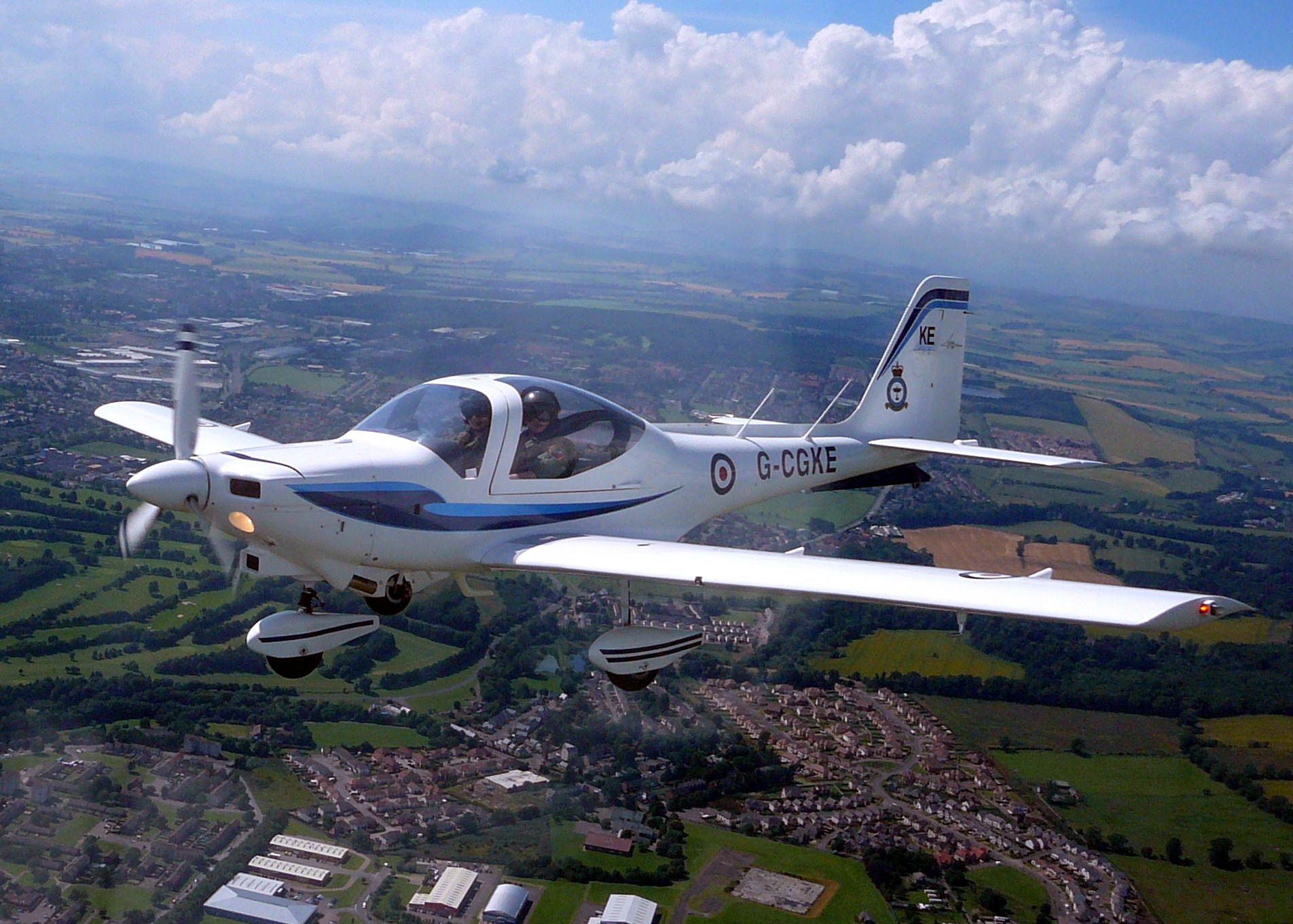
A Grob Tutor T2, in flight over Scotland

Students follow the Elementary Flying Syllabus covering the basics of flight including first solo, navigation, aerobatics, low flying and formation flying. Some individuals apply for a PPL from their flying experience on the UAS.

The flying aspect of the LUAS is overseen by the commanding officer (OC LUAS) and the chief flying instructor (CFI) as well as two qualified flying instructors (QFI), all of which are RAF qualified flying instructors (QFI).

All flying is based at RAF Woodvale where the Grob Tutor is used as the instructional aircraft.

== Adventurous Training ==
LUAS participates in many forms of adventurous training, including climbing, canoeing, kayaking, mountaineering, sailing, ski touring and mountain biking. The squadron's Ground Training Instructor (GTI), an NCO, facilitates most of the above activities.

LUAS relies heavily on student instructors for adventurous training. Qualifications can be gained by attending a Joint Services Adventure Training (JSAT) course. Students attending will be taught the necessary techniques for successful and safe instruction in their chosen discipline, and can then lead others on AT.

== Joining ==
Students can join LUAS in any year at university, and students from higher education establishments around the North West may apply to join. After completing the joining process a successful student would be attested and become a member of the Volunteer Reserve.

== Staff Structure ==
The commanding officer (OC LUAS) has overall responsibility, supported by the adjutant, who oversees administrative tasks and is supported by office staff at the squadron's headquarters.

The student body has a senior student, usually an acting pilot officer (APO), who organises activities and acts as a liaison to the permanent staff. The senior student is supported by APOs, who oversee the students participation.

== Incidents ==
- On Sunday 15 April 1956 'WD351' crashed at Downholland; Sq Ldr Leslie Jack Cooke, 31, the commanding officer, was killed, of 67 Preston New Road, Southport.
- On Monday 21 July 1997 at 5.15pm, the aircraft XX710 crashed at RAF Woodvale, with the two occupants killed. The male pilot was killed instantly, and the 20 year old female occupant was taken to Southport and Formby District General Hospital with terrible injuries. The pilot was the commanding officer, Sqn Ldr Mike Murphy, aged 33, from Wiltshire. At 1.30pm on Wednesday 23 July, after surviving for 44 hours, the second year biochemistry student, from Sutton Coldfield Grammar School for Girls, died in hospital.

== Notable alumni ==
- Donald Braben, Chemistry
- Air Chief Marshal Michael Knight (RAF officer), English
- Sqn Ldr Chris McCann, Aerospace Engineering, Red Arrows

== See also ==
- University Air Squadron units
- University Royal Naval Unit, the Royal Navy equivalent
- Officers Training Corps, the British Army equivalent
- List of Royal Air Force aircraft squadrons
