= Universities of Glasgow and Strathclyde Air Squadron =

University flying squadron of the Royal Air Force

- Badge of UGSAS
- Active: 13 January 1941 – present
- Country: United Kingdom
- Branch: Royal Air Force
- Role: Officer Training, Ab Initio Flying Training, Recruiting
- Part of: No. 6 Flying Training School RAF
- Garrison/HQ: Glasgow / Glasgow Airport
- Mottos: In Utrumque Paratus; Latin: prepared for either event - giving the link between the sword of war and the dove of peace.
- Colors: Black & Gold
- Equipment: 2x Grob Tutor T1

Insignia
- Group badge: The Squadron badge, approved in 1948, is described in heraldic terms "In front of a sword erect argent hilted up, a grey dove volant in bend holding in the beak a sprig of olive vert fructed sable".
- Identification symbol: UGSAS

A Royal Air Force University Air Squadron recruiting within Scotland, Universities of Glasgow and Strathclyde Air Squadron (commonly known as UGSAS) draws its members from six higher education establishments within Glasgow and its surrounding areas.

Its headquarters are in the West End of Glasgow in the Park District and is equipped with three Grob Tutor aircraft which are based at the flying element of the squadron at Glasgow Airport.

The Squadron has approximately 65 student members—the majority of whom hold the rank of Officer Cadet as members of the RAF Volunteer Reserve, and is split into three flights—Clydesdale, Houston and MacIntyre. The Squadron also hosts all DTUS students attending Strathclyde University, who form Everest Flight

The Squadron is a remote unit of 6 FTS.

== History ==
=== Formation and World War Two ===
The Squadron was formed as Glasgow University Air Squadron on 13 January 1941, initially recruiting only from the University of Glasgow and during the war years was actively engaged in the pre-entry training of students for the Royal Air Force. By the end of hostilities, some 400 members had entered the service in various aircrew categories though the Squadron did not operate aircraft during this period.

=== Post war changes ===
In 1946 the RAFVR was re-organised and the squadron was equipped with the de Havilland Tiger Moth and the Miles Magister and flying was carried out initially at the Royal Naval Air Station at Abbotsinch (HMS Sanderling), now Glasgow Airport, but when the airfield was having its runway's relaid in 1950, a move was made to Scone airfield at Perth, some 70 miles (110 km) away from Glasgow. The squadron operated there on and off until 1993. At the same time the Squadron was re-equipped with the De Havilland Chipmunk. In 1965 when the Royal College of Science and Technology became Strathclyde University the squadron was renamed to its current name to reflect this change. In 1969 the Squadron moved back to the now Glasgow Airport. The Scottish Aviation Bulldog replaced the Chipmunk in 1974.

=== The modern squadron ===
More recently students from the University of Strathclyde, University of Stirling, Glasgow School of Art, Glasgow Caledonian University and The University of the West of Scotland have been eligible for Squadron membership and as of 1996 the Squadron became parent to No.4 Air Experience Flight and in March 2000 the squadron was equipped with its current aircraft, the Grob Tutor. In January 2008 the Squadron was re-organised into two flights – Clydesdale and MacIntyre – named in honour after Lord Clydesdale and David MacIntyre, both were prominent aviators in the 1930s in 602 (City Of Glasgow) Sqn RAuxAF. The Squadron detaches up to three times a year for a period of three to four weeks at a time, formerly to either RAF Kinloss or RAF Leuchars, but since those bases have closed, more normally they deploy to RAF Lossiemouth. Whilst deployed, the squadron undertakes a period of intensive flying and adventure training.

== Aircraft operated ==
- De Havilland Tiger Moth T.2 (1946–1950)
- Miles Magister (1946–1950)
- De Havilland Chipmunk T.10 (1950–1974)
- Scottish Aviation Bulldog T.1 (1974–2000)
- Grob 115E Tutor T.1 (2000–2010)
- Grob 115EA Tutor T.2 (2010 – present)

== Incidents ==
- 9 July 1951, at Creampoke Woods at Stainfield, Lincolnshire, 'WD360' crashed, with JK McIntyre killed
- 11 December 2002, a Grob Tutor crashed into a field in Gartocharn, near Loch Lomond, after engine failure. Both the student pilot and instructor managed to walk away from the crash unharmed.
- 4 November 2022, a Grob Tutor operated by the air squadron declared pan-pan and squawked 7700 over Glasgow after experiencing low oil pressure and low RPM with the aircraft's engine. The aircraft returned safely to Glasgow airport with both crew members unharmed.

== Alumni ==
- Don Cameron (balloonist), built Britain's first hot air balloon in 1967, the Bristol Belle

== See also ==
- University Air Squadron units
- University Royal Naval Unit, the Royal Navy equivalent
- Officers Training Corps, the British Army equivalent
- List of Royal Air Force aircraft squadrons
