= No. 360 Squadron RAF =

Defunct flying squadron of the Royal Air Force

- Active: 1 April 1966 – 31 October 1994
- Country: United Kingdom
- Branch: Royal Air Force
- Role: Electronic countermeasures training
- Motto(s): Latin: Confundemus (Translation: "We shall throw into confusion")

Insignia
- Squadron Badge heraldry: In front of a trident erect, a moth, wings displayed
- Squadron Roundel

Aircraft flown
- Electronic warfare: English Electric Canberra

No. 360 Squadron RAF was an electronic countermeasures (ECM) squadron of the Royal Air Force.

== History ==
The squadron was created from the merger of the personnel of 831 Naval Air Squadron of the Fleet Air Arm (previously operating the Fairey Gannet ECM.6) and 'B' Flight, No. 97 Squadron RAF (flying English Electric Canberras) at RAF Watton on 1 April 1966. Initially it was known as Joint Electronic Warfare Trials and Training Force before being given its official designation of No. 360 [RN/RAF] Squadron on 23 September 1966. The squadron flew a number of Canberra types: B.2s, T.4s (for pilot training); a B.6; PR.7s and E.17s. The first Canberra T.17 was delivered just before Christmas 1966 and this type soldiered on until disbandment in 1994.

A sister squadron, No. 361 Squadron RAF was also formed in January 1967 for deployment to the Far East. However, following the 1967 Defence Review, 361 Squadron became redundant and was officially disbanded in July the same year.

No. 360 Squadron moved to RAF Cottesmore in April 1969. The official squadron badge was awarded in 1973: the trident represents the Royal Navy involvement, whilst the moth (of the species Melese laodamia) depicts the unique role of the Squadron (this particular moth avoids predatory bats by jamming their prey-finding "radar" system). 360 Squadron moved again in September 1975 to RAF Wyton where it remained until being disbanded in October 1994, its work being taken over by Flight Refuelling Ltd.

In 1991 360 Squadron achieved 25 years of service, and was presented with a Squadron Standard. No. 360 Squadron had many unique aspects: its role, its number had not been previously issued, and it is the only squadron to have been formed, awarded a Standard, and disbanded during Queen Elizabeth II's reign.

== Aircraft operated ==
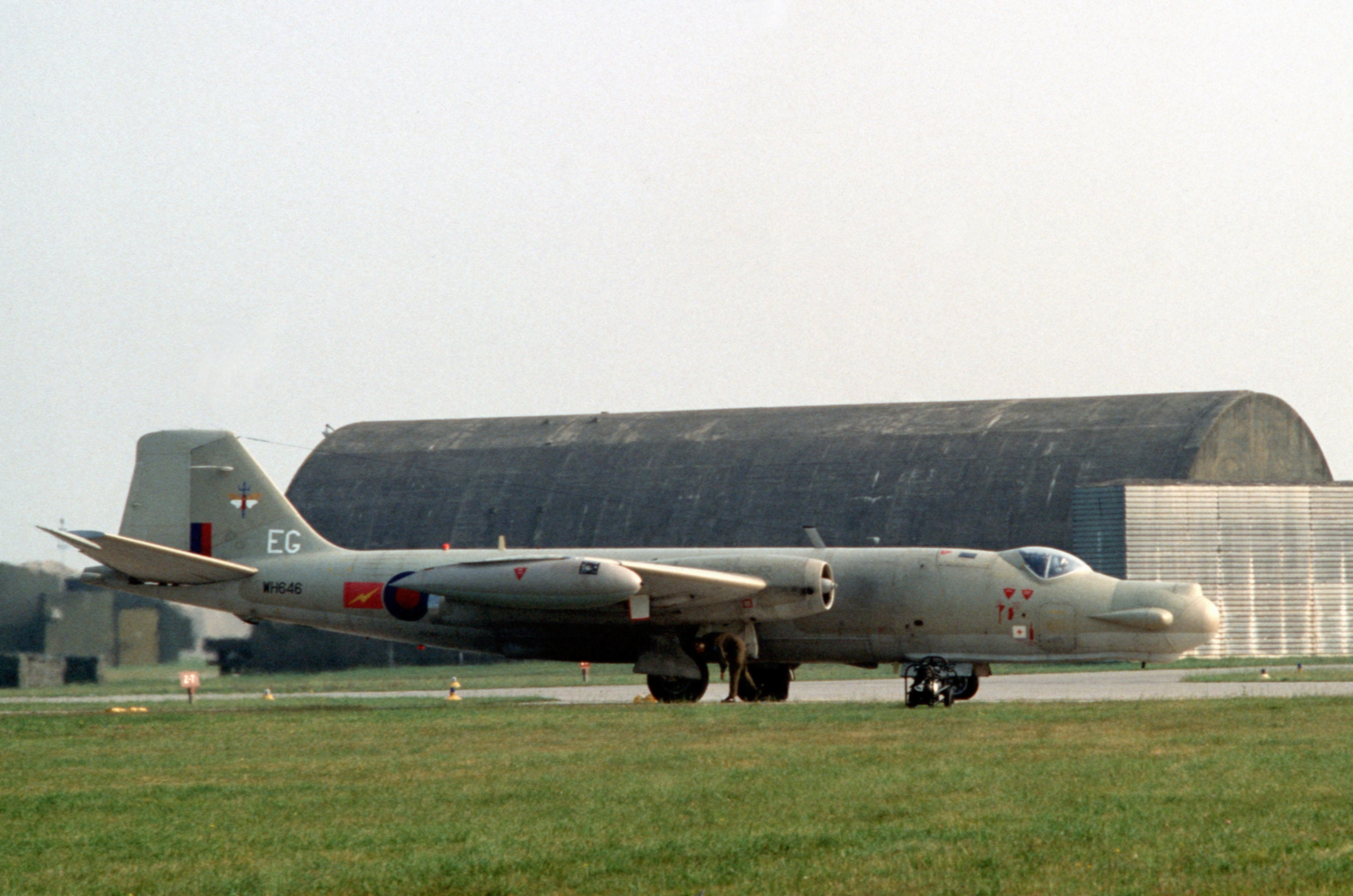
An English Electric Canberra T17 of No. 360 Sqn at Aviano Air Base, Italy

Aircraft operated by no. 360 Squadron RAF, data from
From	To	Aircraft	Version
April 1966		English Electric Canberra	T.4
September 1966	May 1967	English Electric Canberra	B.6
September 1966	August 1967	English Electric Canberra	B.2
December 1966	October 1994	English Electric Canberra	T.17
February 1987	October 1994	English Electric Canberra	T.17A
September 1991	October 1994	English Electric Canberra	E.15 PR.7

== Squadron bases ==
Bases and airfields used by no. 360 Squadron RAF, data from
From	To	Base
1 April 1966	21 April 1969	RAF Watton
21 April 1969	1 September 1975	RAF Cottesmore
1 September 1975	31 October 1994	RAF Wyton

== See also ==
- list of RAF squadrons
