= Melese laodamia =

Scientific classification
- Domain: Eukaryota
- Kingdom: Animalia
- Phylum: Arthropoda
- Class: Insecta
- Order: Lepidoptera
- Superfamily: Noctuoidea
- Family: Erebidae
- Subfamily: Arctiinae
- Genus: Melese
- Species: M. laodamia

Binomial name
- Melese laodamia (H. Druce, 1884)

Synonyms
- Neritos laodamia H. Druce, 1884; Neritos cutheans H. Druce, 1896

Species of moth

Melese laodamia is a moth of the family Erebidae. It was described by Herbert Druce in 1884. It is found in Mexico, Panama, Colombia, Venezuela and Trinidad.

This moth was used in the insignia of the RAF 360 Squadron, whose task was to develop equipment and tactics to jam enemy radars during the Cold War period. The inspiration was the observation that Melese laodamia produces ultrasound when handled. The ultrasound was thought to jam the sonar of insectivorous bats.
