= No. 358 Squadron RAF =

Defunct flying squadron of the Royal Air Force

- Squadron badge for No. 358 Squadron RAF
- Active: 8 November 1944 – 19 November 1945
- Country: United Kingdom
- Branch: Royal Air Force
- Role: Bomber squadron Special duties
- Part of: No. 231 Group RAF, South East Asia Command
- Motto(s): Latin: Alere flammam (Translation: "To feed the flame")

Insignia
- Squadron Badge heraldry: An arm embowed, holding in the hand a torch The torch represents the spirit of freedom and the arm upholding it the role played by the squadron
- Squadron Codes: TA (Nov 1944 – Dec 1944)

Aircraft flown
- Bomber: Consolidated Liberator
- Trainer: Vickers Wellington

No. 358 Squadron RAF was a Bomber and Special duties squadron of the Royal Air Force flying with South East Asia Command from 1944 to 1945.

== History ==
The squadron was formed on 8 November 1944 at Kolar, India with personnel of the disbanded 1673 Heavy Conversion Unit. Its role was as a heavy bomber unit flying the Consolidated Liberator. The squadron performed only one bombing mission on 13 January 1945, bombing Mandalay and by then flying from Digri. Thereafter the squadron role changed to a special duties squadron, starting operations as such in the night from 22 to 23 January 1945, when 11 of the squadron's Liberators were dispatched on missions around Hanoi. Three aircraft were lost, with only two successfully completing their missions. On 10 February 1945 the squadron moved to Jessore. For the rest of the war the squadron dropped agents and supplies to resistance groups in Japanese-held territory. After the Japanese surrender the squadron then dropped supplies to POW camps and repatriated released prisoners. It was disbanded on 21 November 1945 at Bishnupur.

== Aircraft operated ==
Aircraft operated by no. 358 Squadron RAF, data from
From	To	Aircraft	Version
November 1944	December 1944	Vickers Wellington	Mk.X
December 1944	November 1945	Consolidated Liberator	Mk.VI

== Squadron bases ==
Bases and airfields used by no. 358 Squadron RAF, data from
From	To	Base
8 November 1944	3 January 1945	RAF Kolar, Karnataka, British India
3 January 1945	10 February 1945	RAF Digri, Bengal, British India
10 February 1945	19 November 1945	RAF Jessore, Bengal, British India
19 November 1945	21 November 1945	RAF Bishnupur, Bengal, British India

== See also ==
- List of Royal Air Force aircraft squadrons
