= No. 586 Squadron RAF =

- Active: 10 December 1943 – 30 December 1943
- Country: United Kingdom
- Branch: Royal Air Force
- Role: electronic warfare

No. 586 Squadron RAF was a proposed electronic warfare squadron of the Royal Air Force during the Second World War.

== History ==
The squadron was formed on paper on 10 December 1943. It was going to be an electronic warfare unit flying the Boeing Fortress Mk.II. It was decided to use 214 Squadron in this role and the squadron creation was cancelled on 30 December 1943, without it ever having any aircraft or personnel.

== See also ==
- List of Royal Air Force aircraft squadrons
