= No. 361 Squadron RAF =

Defunct flying squadron of the Royal Air Force

- Active: 2 January 1967 - 14 July 1967
- Country: United Kingdom
- Branch: Royal Air Force
- Type: Flying squadron
- Role: ECM training
- Garrison/HQ: RAF Watton
- Mottos: We formed, They fumbled, It failed (unofficial)
- Equipment: English Electric Canberra T.17

No. 361 Squadron RAF was a squadron of the Royal Air Force which disbanded in July 1967 having only been operational since January 1967.

== History ==
It was formed on 2 January 1967 at RAF Watton, in Norfolk, as a joint RAF/Royal Navy unit, to provide ECM training for the two services, initially sharing the English Electric Canberra T.17 aircraft, an electronic warfare training variant, of No. 360 Squadron RAF. Unlike its sister squadron, it was intended to operate in the Middle and Far East regions. However, following the Defence Review of early 1967 and the subsequent withdrawal from the overseas commitments, the squadron effectively ceased to exist within weeks of its formation, its crews returning to No. 360 Squadron. The new squadron was officially disbanded on 14 July 1967.
