= No. 628 Squadron RAF =

- Active: 21 March 1944 – 1 October 1944
- Country: United Kingdom
- Branch: Royal Air Force
- Type: Inactive
- Role: Meteorological and air-sea rescue squadron
- Part of: No. 225 Group RAF, Air Command, South East Asia
- Base: Red Hills Lake, Madras

Aircraft flown
- Patrol: Consolidated Catalina; Two-engined Flying Boat

No. 628 Squadron RAF was a meteorological and air-sea rescue squadron of the Royal Air Force during the Second World War.

== History ==
The squadron was formed at Red Hills Lake in Madras, India, on 21 March 1944, by redesignating 'B' Flight of No. 357 Squadron RAF. The unit was equipped with Consolidated Catalina Mks.Ib and Mk.IV flying boats, and operated as part of No. 225 Group RAF, Air Command, South East Asia. Although intended for special duties, the squadron spent most of its time with meteorological reconnaissance and ASR (air-sea rescue) flights over the Indian Ocean. It was disbanded at Red Hills Lake on 1 October 1944.

== Aircraft operated ==
Aircraft operated by No. 628 Squadron RAF
From	To	Aircraft	Variant
March 1944	September 1944	Consolidated Catalina	Mk.Ib
July 1944	September 1944	Consolidated Catalina	Mk.IV

== See also ==
- List of Royal Air Force aircraft squadrons
