= No. 357 Squadron RAF =

Defunct flying squadron of the Royal Air Force

- Active: 1 February 1944 – 15 November 1945
- Country: United Kingdom
- Branch: Royal Air Force
- Role: Special operations
- Part of: No. 231 Group RAF, South East Asia Command
- Mottos: Latin: Mortem hostibus (Translation: "We bring death to the enemy")

Insignia
- Squadron Badge heraldry: A crocodile
- Squadron Codes: No specific identity markings are known to have been carried

No. 357 Squadron was a special operations squadron of the Royal Air Force. During the Second World War it was involved in supplying Allied ground forces operating behind enemy lines, in the South-East Asian theatre.

== History ==
The squadron was formed on 1 February 1944 at Digri, Bengal, from No. 1576 (Special Duties) Flight as an expansion of the Royal Air Force Special Duty Service. The squadron was equipped with Consolidated Liberator and Lockheed Hudson aircraft, which formed "A" Flight, whilst "B" Flight consisted of four Consolidated Catalina aircraft operated by the squadron from Red Hills Lake, Madras. The Catalina flight became No. 628 Squadron on 21 March 1944. On 15 September 1944, No. 357 Squadron moved to Jessore, Bengal. Operational flights dropping small numbers of agents and equipment into Malaya began in November 1944 using the squadrons Liberators. The flights in early 1945 were to locations in Kelatan and Perak. Later flights were reaching as far south as Batu Pahat and Kota Tinggi and covering 3,500 air miles with a flying times of over 22 hours - near the aircraft's maximum range.

Also early in 1945, the Hudsons were replaced by Douglas Dakotas, and "C" Flight was equipped with Westland Lysanders joined the squadron. The squadron disbanded on 15 November 1945.

== Aircraft operated ==
Aircraft operated by no. 357 Squadron RAF, data from
From	To	Aircraft	Version
February 1944	March 1944	Consolidated Catalina	Mk.IV
February 1944	December 1944	Lockheed Hudson	Mk.IIIa
February 1944	December 1944	Consolidated Liberator	Mk.III
September 1944	October 1945	Consolidated Liberator	Mk.VI
December 1944	November 1945	Douglas Dakaota	Mks.III, IV
January 1945	March 1945	Stinson Sentinel	
March 1945	November 1945	Westland Lysander	Mk.IIIa

== Squadron bases ==
Bases and airfields used by no. 357 Squadron RAF, data from
From	To	Base	Remark
1 February 1944	15 September 1945	Digri, Bengal, British India	Dets. at RAF China Bay, Ceylon and RAF Redhills Lake, Madras, British India
15 September 1945	15 November 1945	RAF Jessore, Bengal, British India	Dets. at RAF Meiktila, Burma and RAF Mingaladon, Burma

== Commanding officers ==
Officers commanding no. 357 Squadron RAF, data from
From	To	Name
February 1944	December 1944	W/Cdr. J.R. Moore
December 1944	July 1945	W/Cdr. L.M. Hodges, DSO, DFC
July 1945	November 1945	W/Cdr. P.R. Gaskell, DFC
