= No. 513 Squadron RAF =

Defunct flying squadron of the Royal Air Force

- Active: 15 Sep 1943 – 21 Nov 1943
- Country: United Kingdom
- Branch: Royal Air Force
- Role: Bomber squadron
- Part of: No. 3 Group RAF, Bomber Command

Insignia
- Squadron Badge heraldry: No badge authorised
- Squadron Codes: CS (Oct 1943 – Nov 1943)

Aircraft flown
- Bomber: Short Stirling

No. 513 Squadron RAF was a non-operational bomber squadron of the Royal Air Force in 1943.

== History ==
No. 513 squadron was formed from a flight of No. 218 Squadron on 15 September 1943 at RAF Witchford, Cambridgeshire. It worked up for the Short Stirling bomber, but did not obtain operational status, as its aircraft were more needed at the Stirling conversion units and was disbanded on 21 November 1943.

== Aircraft operated ==
Aircraft operated by no. 513 Squadron RAF, data from
From	To	Aircraft	Variant
October 1943	November 1943	Short Stirling	Mk.III

== Squadron bases ==
Bases and airfields used by no. 513 Squadron RAF, data from
From	To	Base
15 September 1943	21 November 1943	RAF Witchford, Cambridgeshire

== Commanding officers ==
Officers commanding no. 513 Squadron RAF, data from
From	To	Name
15 September 1943	21 November 1943	W/Cdr. G.E. Harrison, DFC

== See also ==
- List of Royal Air Force aircraft squadrons
