= No. 195 Squadron RAF =

Defunct flying squadron of the Royal Air Force

- Active: 1942-1944; 1944-1945
- Country: United Kingdom
- Branch: Royal Air Force
- Motto(s): Velocitate Fortis (Latin: Strong by speed)

No. 195 Squadron was a Royal Air Force aircraft squadron that operated during the Second World War, at first in the ground attack role and later as heavy bomber unit with the Avro Lancaster.

== History ==
No. 195 Squadron was formed at RAF Duxford on 16 November 1942 with the Hawker Typhoon. After a long training phase the squadron became operational at RAF Ludham with the Typhoon operating offensive Rhubarb sorties and from the end of the year was involved with Roadstead operations using the Typhoons as bombers. The squadron was disbanded at RAF Fairlop on 15 February 1944.

On 1 October 1944 the squadron was reformed at RAF Witchford mainly from the former C Flight of 115 Squadron. Part of No. 3 Group it operated the Avro Lancaster in the heavy bomber role and operated from RAF Wratting Common until the end of the war in Europe. At the end of the European war the squadron was involved in supply drops over the Netherlands and transporting Prisoners of War to the UK from Germany and Italy. The squadron was disbanded for the final time on 14 August 1945.

== Aircraft operated ==
Dates	Aircraft	Variant	Notes
1942-1944	Hawker Typhoon	IB	
1944-1945	Avro Lancaster	I and III	

=== Squadron Code Letters ===
Dates	Letters	Aircraft
1942-1944	JE	JEK NG452
1944-1945	A4	A4C PB858 A4E HK868 A4F NN740 A4G NF995 A4H NG166 A4J HK660 A4T ? A4W ? A4X HK690
