= RAF Woodvale =

Royal Air Force station in Merseyside, England

RAF Woodvale
- Woodvale Aerodrome
- Near Woodvale, Merseyside in England
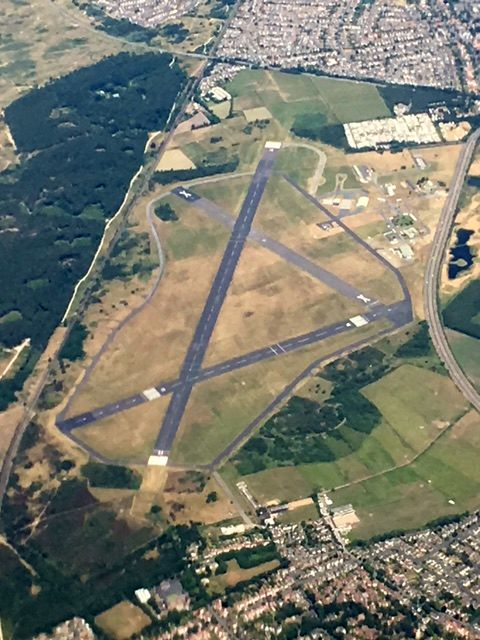
- RAF Woodvale

- Ut Aquilae volent (Latin for 'That Eagles May Fly')

Site information
- Type: Royal Air Force station
- Owner: Ministry of Defence
- Operator: Royal Air Force
- Controlled by: No. 22 Group (Training)
- Condition: Active
- Website: https://www.raf.mod.uk/our-organisation/stations/raf-woodvale/

Location
- Shown within Merseyside
- Coordinates: 53°34′54″N 003°03′20″W
- Area: 173 hectares

Site history
- Built: 1941
- In use: 1941–present

Garrison information
- Current commander: Squadron Leader M Barrett
- Occupants: Liverpool University Air Squadron; Manchester and Salford Universities Air Squadron; No. 10 Air Experience Flight; No. 631 Volunteer Gliding Squadron; No. 611 (West Lancashire) Squadron (RAuxAF).

Airfield information
- Identifiers: ICAO: EGOW
- Elevation: 11 metres (36 ft) AMSL
Runways
Direction	Length and surface
03/21	1,647 metres (5,404 ft) Asphalt
08/26	1,068 metres (3,504 ft) Asphalt

Royal Air Force Woodvale or more simply RAF Woodvale (ICAO: EGOW) is a Royal Air Force station located 4 mi (6.4 km) next to the towns of Formby and Ainsdale in an area called Woodvale which is located to the south of Southport, Merseyside. Woodvale was constructed as an all-weather night fighter airfield for the defence of Liverpool. However, it did not open until 7 December 1941 which was just after the Liverpool Blitz which peaked in May of that year.

== History ==
=== Second World War ===
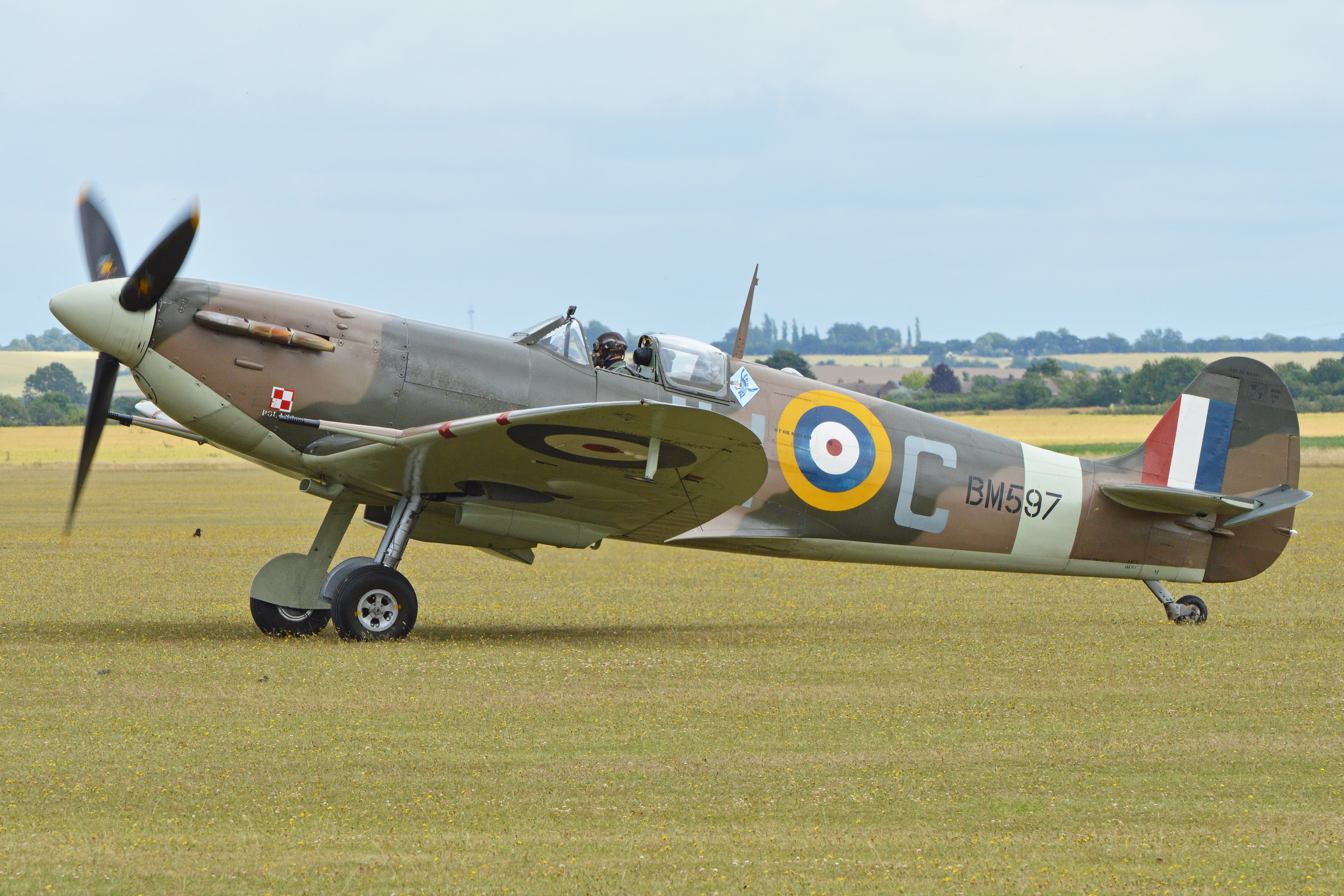
Combat veteran Spitfire Mk Vb BM597 flew from RAF Woodvale during the Second World War.

Woodvale opened in December 1941, six months after the end of the Liverpool Blitz. It was used for short periods by RAF squadrons that were rotated out of the zones in southern of England closest to German-occupied Europe. During their time at Woodvale, squadrons defended Merseyside. Polish 308 (Krakowski) Squadron was the first to arrive, on 12 December 1941, from RAF Northolt before leaving on 1 April 1942. Squadrons were rotated regularly. Several were Polish, including 315 (Dęblinski) Squadron and 317 (Wilenski) Squadron. Spitfire IIs and Vbs were operated by these units.

Support units working with all three Services also served there, calibrating anti-aircraft guns and towing targets for the Royal Navy. In April 1945, Woodvale briefly became a Tender for the Royal Navy's Fleet Air Arm airfield at Burscough, HMS Ringtail, being given the name HMS Ringtail II.

=== Cold war ===
After a period of inactivity, Woodvale reopened on 22 July 1946, when the Spitfire Mk.14s of No. 611 (West Lancashire) Squadron, Royal Auxiliary Air Force, moved here from Liverpool Airport at Speke. The squadron re-equipped with Spitfire Mk.22s in February 1949.

Gloster Meteor F.4 and F.8 jets were flown between May 1951 until 9 July 1951. Because of the need for better facilities, the Squadron moved to RAF Hooton Park, joining No. 610 Squadron, where it remained until its disbandment on 10 March 1957. The Temperature and Humidity Flight, operating Spitfires and Mosquitos, was based there from 1953 to 1958.

The last operational flight by an RAF Spitfire was flown from Woodvale in 1957. Its mission was related to the work of a meteorological unit stationed at the base.

No. 5 Civilian Anti-Aircraft Co-Operation Unit moved to Woodvale on 1 January 1958, and operated target-towing Meteors until 30 September 1971 when the unit was disbanded.

=== Training station ===
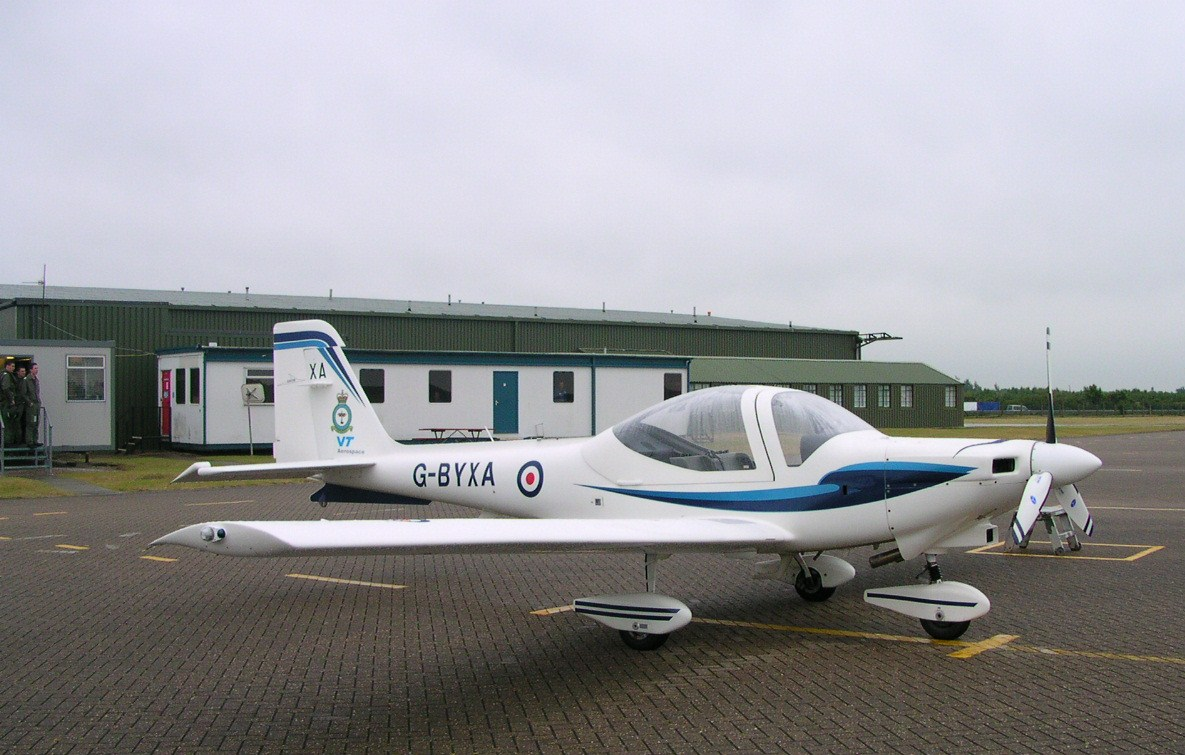
10 AEF Grob Tutor and hangar at RAF Woodvale.

Since 1971, RAF Woodvale has remained a training station. Liverpool University Air Squadron- LUAS moved in from RAF Hooton Park on 2 July 1951. Manchester and Salford University Air Squadron (then named Manchester University Air Squadron) (MUAS) (now MASUAS) moved in from Manchester's Barton Aerodrome in March 1953. 10 Air Experience Flight was formed at RAF Woodvale on 25 August 1958 and 631 Volunteer Gliding Squadron moved in from RAF Sealand in March 2006.

The current station commander is Squadron Leader Mark Barrett.

A BAe Hawk T1A, number XX247, was installed as the site's gate guardian in November 2017, replacing an earlier Jet Provost.

== Based units ==
Flying and notable non-flying units based at RAF Woodvale.

=== Royal Air Force ===
No. 2 Group (Air Combat Support) RAF

- No. 611 (West Lancashire) Squadron Royal Auxiliary Air Force

No. 22 Group (Training) RAF

- No. 2 Flying Training School
  - No. 631 Volunteer Gliding Squadron – Grob Viking TX1
- No. 6 Flying Training School
  - No. 10 Air Experience Flight – Grob Tutor T1
  - Liverpool University Air Squadron – Grob Tutor T1
  - Manchester and Salford Universities Air Squadron – Grob Tutor T1
- Air Training Corps
  - Merseyside Wing
    - Headquarters Merseyside Wing
    - 611 (Woodvale) Squadron (Air Training Corps)

=== Civilian ===
- Woodvale Aircraft Owners Limited - WAOL.

== Woodvale Rally ==
In 1971, RAF Woodvale hosted the first annual Woodvale International Rally. The event was a charitable event, that originally began as a model aircraft show. It grew over the years to include car clubs with both classic cars, vintage cars and other vehicle displays. It usually occupied the first weekend in August. The 2012 rally had to be re-located and rescheduled to nearby Victoria Park, Southport, Merseyside, on safety grounds, on what would later on become a permanent move for the rally. Asbestos was discovered from old World War II structures that had been buried long ago. After the 50th rally was held in 2018, a disagreement with the park's management led to the permanent cancellation of the rally in 2019.

== Merseyside Police Air Support Group ==
Basing the Merseyside Air Support Group at RAF Woodvale made the station something of a target for criminals. Just before 2230 on Friday 9 October 2009 a window of the helicopter was smashed and petrol poured inside causing the helicopter to be grounded.

On 17 May 2010 the Merseyside Police helicopter was again attacked and grounded, after four masked intruders broke into the airbase at around 04:00 causing what was described as minor damage.

As part of the reorganisation of Police Air Support in England and Wales and the formation of the National Police Air Service, Merseyside operationally retired its dedicated Police helicopter G-XMII in July 2011. Cover would then be provided with four aircraft from Cheshire, Lancashire, North Wales and Greater Manchester, the nearest to Merseyside being based at Hawarden Airport with G-XMII providing back up. From 1 June 2012, Merseyside Police signed a four-year deal to lease the helicopter to the Norwegian Police Service in response to the 2011 terrorist attacks in Norway.

== Freedom of the Borough ==
RAF Woodvale was granted the Freedom of the Metropolitan Borough of Sefton on 17 May 2011.

== See also ==
- List of Royal Air Force stations
