= RAF Watton =

Former Royal Air Force station in Norfolk, England

RAF Watton USAAF Station 376
- Watton, Norfolk in England
- RAF Watton station badge

Site information
- Type: Royal Air Force station
- Owner: Ministry of Defence
- Operator: Royal Air Force; United States Army Air Forces
- Controlled by: RAF Bomber Command; RAF Signals Command; Eighth Air Force

Location
- Shown within Norfolk
- Coordinates: 52.564°N 0.863°E

Site history
- Built: 1937
- Built by: John Laing & Son Ltd.
- In use: 1937–1978 or 1992.
- Battles/wars: Second World War; Cold War

Garrison information
- Garrison: 25th Bombardment Group (Reconnaissance)

Airfield information
- Elevation: 57 metres (187 ft) AMSL
Runways
Direction	Length and surface
11/29	1,829 metres (6,001 ft) Concrete

Royal Air Force Watton or more simply RAF Watton is a former Royal Air Force station located 9 mi (14 km) southwest of East Dereham, Norfolk, England.

Opened in 1937 it was used by both the Royal Air Force (RAF) and United States Army Air Forces (USAAF) during the Second World War. During the war it was used primarily as a bomber airfield, being the home of RAF Bomber Command squadrons until being used by the United States Army Air Forces Eighth Air Force as a major overhaul depot for Consolidated B-24 Liberator bombers and as a weather reconnaissance base.

After the war, it was returned to RAF use until being turned over to the British Army in the early 1990s. It was closed then put up for sale.

== History ==
=== RAF Bomber Command use ===
RAF Watton was a permanent RAF station built by John Laing & Son in 1937, and first used as a light bomber airfield housing for varying periods by RAF Bomber Command.

The following squadrons and units were based at Watton at some point during this time:

- No. 18 Squadron RAF between 21 May 1940 and 26 May 1940. The squadron operated the Bristol Blenheim IV before moving to RAF Gatwick.
- No. 21 Squadron RAF from 2 March 1939 with the Blenheim I before upgrading to the Blenheim IV in September 1939. The squadron had detachments at RAF Bassingbourn, RAF Horsham St Faith and RAF Bodney before all of the squadron moved to RAF Lossiemouth on 24 June 1940 however this was not for long as on 30 October 1940 the squadron moved back to Watton and had detachments at RAF Bodney, RAF Manston, RAF Lossiemouth and RAF Luqa. The squadron moved to Luqa on 25 December 1941.
- No. 34 Squadron RAF was based at Watton between 2 March 1939 and 12 August 1939 with the Blenheim I before leaving for the Far east.
- No. 82 Squadron RAF between 22 August 1939 and 21 March 1942. The squadron operated the Blenheim I alongside the Mk IV until September 1939 when the Mk I was discontinued and the Mk IV started as the main type, 82 Squadron had detachments at RAF Odiham, RAF Lossiemouth, RAF Tangmere and RAF Luqa. The squadron then moved to the Far east.
- No. 90 Squadron RAF reformed here on 3 May 1941 with the Boeing Fortress I with an detachment at RAF Great Massingham before moving to RAF West Raynham on 15 May 1941.
- No. 105 Squadron RAF between 10 July 1940 and 31 October 1940 operating the Blenheim IV before moving to RAF Swanton Morley.
- No. 17 (Pilots) Advanced Flying Unit RAF until July 1943.

=== USAAF use ===
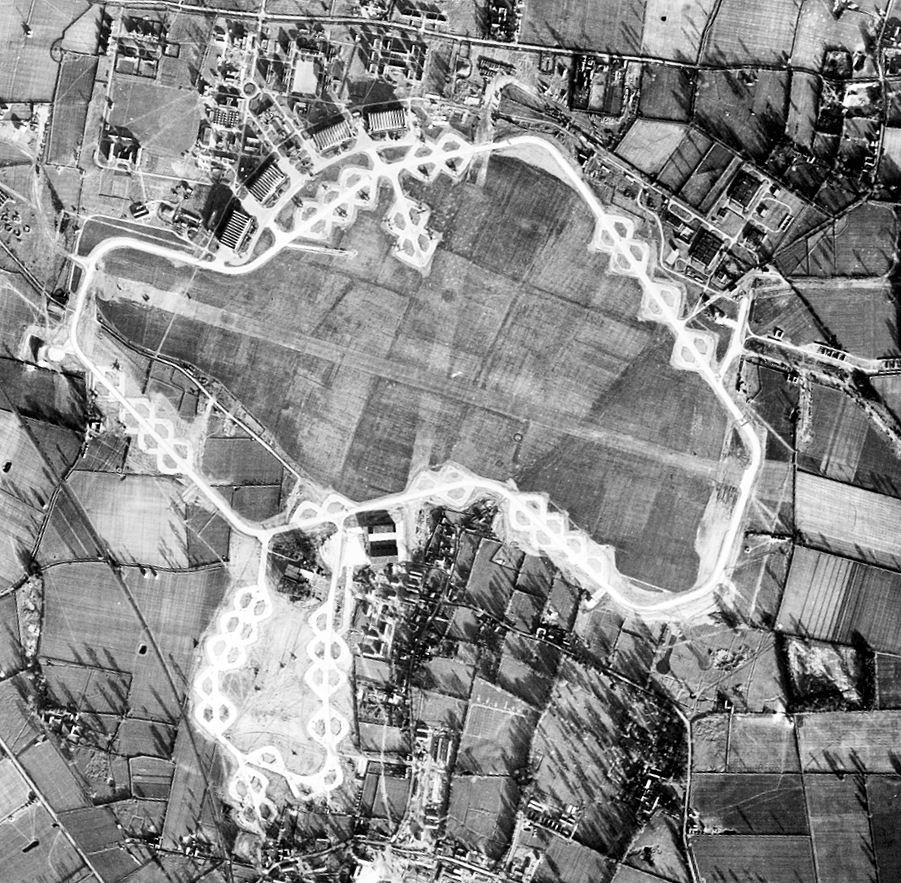
25 January 1944 aerial photograph of the RAF Watton airfield and the USAAF 3d Strategic Air Depot. The bomb dump to the right of the perimeter track; the 3d SAD is at the bottom (south) of the image.

In 1943 Watton was turned over to the United States Army Air Forces Eighth Air Force for use as an air depot. The airfield was originally grass surfaced but, during the American tenure, the airfield had a 2,000 yd (1,829 m) long concrete runway constructed. A concrete perimeter track was built and a total of fifty-three hardstandings, of which forty-one were spectacle and twelve of the frying-pan type.

The four original C-type hangars, arranged in the usual crescent on the northern side of the airfield, were backed by the permanent buildings of the pre-war RAF camp. Additional hangars were added and three blister hangars at dispersals. The construction of the airfield necessitated the closure of two public roads.

Watton was given USAAF designation Station 376.

==== 3rd Strategic Air Depot ====
Under the American tenancy, Watton was expanded to become the 3rd Strategic Air Depot, which was the major overhaul and repair of the Consolidated B-24 Liberators of the 2nd Air Division. The air depot complex was adjacent to Watton airfield and built in the village of Griston to the south, bordering the B1077 road. However, the depot was known officially as Neaton, given USAAF designation Station 505, a village located to the north of Watton town.

The 3rd Strategic Air Depot remained operational until the American departure in July 1945.

==== 25th Bombardment Group (Reconnaissance) ====
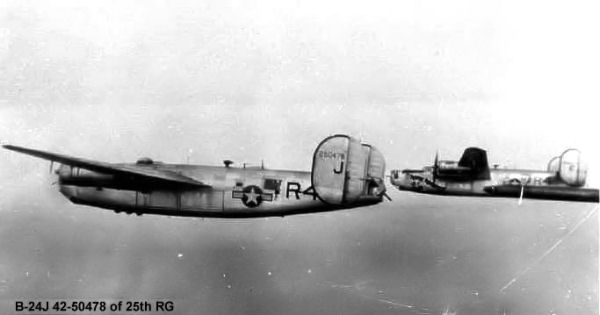
Consolidated B-24J-401-CF Liberator of 25th BG.

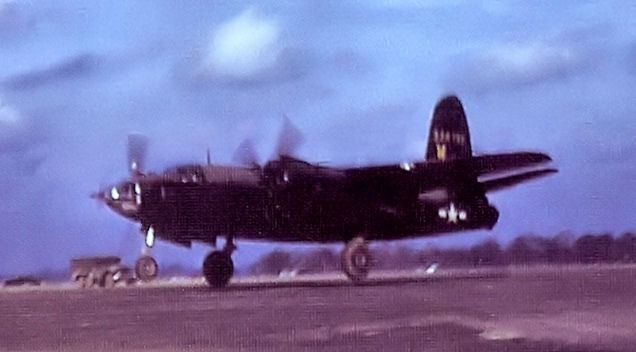
Martin B-26G-1-MA Marauder painted black for night reconnaissance missions of the 654th Bomb Squadron.

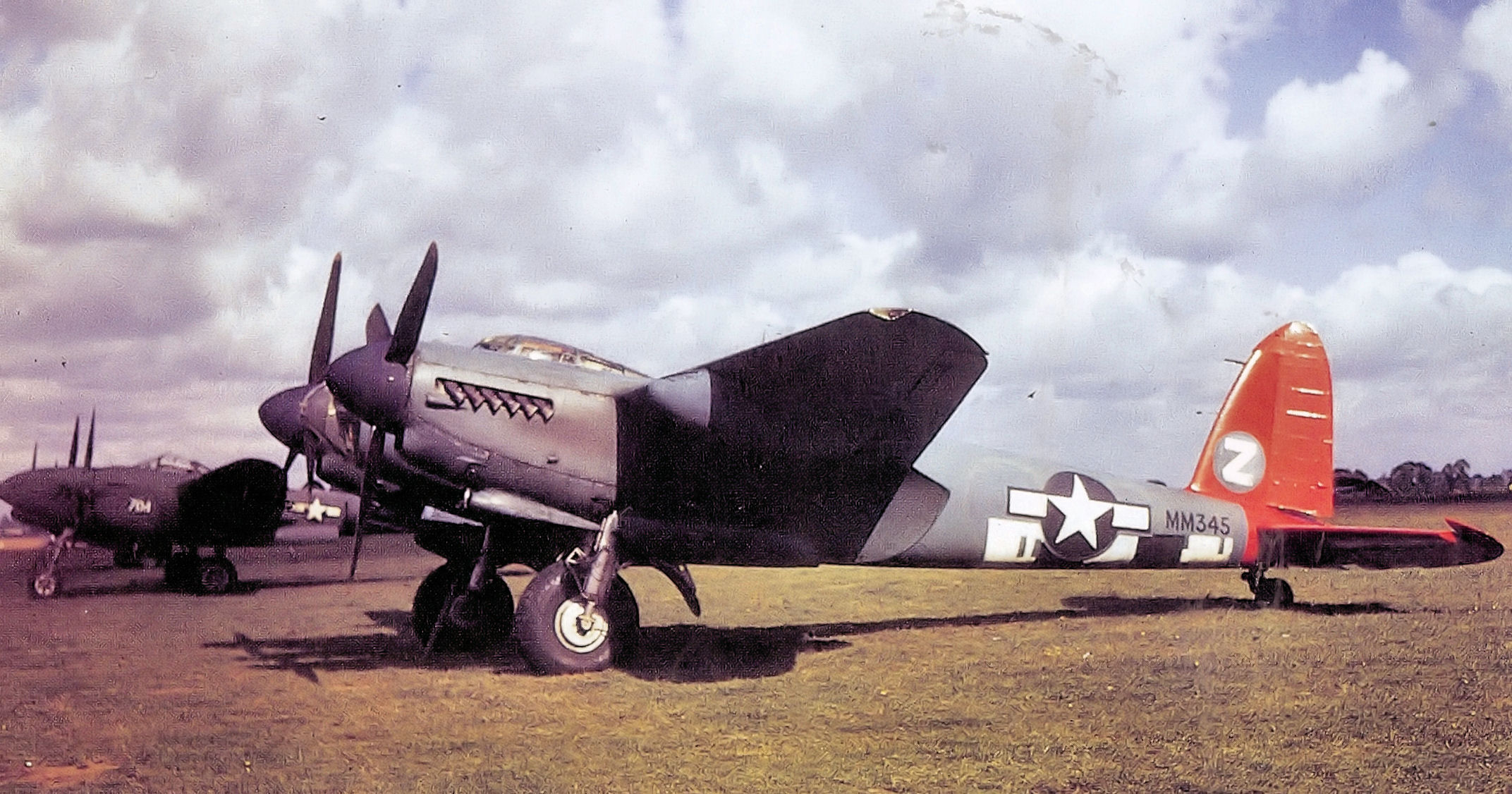
A de Havilland Mosquito XVI of the 654th Bomb Squadron.

Watton was also the home of the 25th Bombardment Group (Reconnaissance) which was formed at Watton as the 802nd Reconnaissance Group in February 1944. The unit was renamed the 25th on 9 August 1944.

Its operational units were:

- 652d Bombardment Squadron (Heavy) B-17F/G, B-24J.
- 653d Bombardment Squadron (Light) de Havilland Mosquito Mk XVI.(WX)
- 654th Bombardment Squadron (Special) de Havilland Mosquito Mk XVI (BA), North American B-25 Mitchell, Martin B-26G Marauder, Douglas A-26 Invader.

The 652d Bomb Squadron originated as a provisional weather reconnaissance unit that was formed at RAF St Eval in Cornwall with Boeing B-17 Flying Fortresses on 8 September 1943 for conducting meteorological fights over the Atlantic Ocean. In November 1943 the unit moved to RAF Bovingdon after flying 231 weather sorties. At Bovington, the squadron was reorganized as the 8th Weather Reconnaissance Squadron on 28 March 1944, then transferred to Watton on 12 April 1944.

The 653d and 654th Bomb Squadrons were established at Watton on 12 April for special weather reconnaissance missions over enemy-occupied territory in advance of bomber formations and visual coverage of target strikes. Pilots for the Mosquitos came from former Lockheed P-38 Lightning pilots of the 50th Fighter Squadron transferred from the 342d Composite Group based in Iceland.

From Watton the 25th continued weather flights over the waters adjacent to the British Isles and occasionally to the Azores to obtain meteorological data along with night photographic missions to detect enemy activity; and daylight photographic and mapping missions over the Continent.

Also, the group occasionally engaged in electronic-countermeasure missions in which chaff was spread to confuse enemy defences during Allied attacks.

The 25th Bomb Group moved to Drew AAF, Florida during July–August 1945 and was inactivated on 8 September 1945. The group flew a total of 3,370 sorties for the loss of 15 aircraft.

=== Postwar RAF use ===
After the war, Watton reverted to RAF control on 27 September 1945. It was used by various flying units of RAF Signals Command, No. 199 Squadron RAF, for example being based at Watton in the early 1950s with Mosquito NF36s operating with the Central Signals Establishment, and in 1953 116 Squadron operated with Avro Lincolns, a Hasting and a number of MkII Avro Ansons. The last three Lincolns serving with No. 151 Squadron on signals duties were withdrawn in March 1963.

The following squadrons and units were based at Watton at some point during this time:

- No. 51 Squadron RAF reformed at Watton on 21 August 1958 with the English Electric Canberra Mks B.2 and B.6 and the de Havilland Comet C.2(R). The squadron also started the Handley Page Hastings C.1 from February 1963 however shortly after this on 31 March 1963 the squadron moved to RAF Wyton.
- No. 97 Squadron RAF reformed here on 25 May 1963 with the Vickers Varsity T.1, Canberra Mk B.2 and the Hastings C.2. On 2 January 1967 the squadron was disbanded here.
- No. 98 Squadron RAF between 1 October 1963 and 17 April 1969 with the Canberra B.2 before moving to RAF Cottesmore.
- No. 115 Squadron RAF between 1 October 1963 and 9 April 1969 when the squadron moved to RAF Cottesmore. The squadron operated the Varsity T.1, Vickers Valetta C.1, Hastings C.2 and Armstrong Whitworth AW.660 Argosy E.1.
- No. 116 Squadron RAF between 1 August 1952 and 21 August 1958. The squadron reformed here when 'N' Calibration Squadron was redesignated with the Avro Anson C.19, Avro Lincoln B.2, Hastings C.1 and the Varsity T.1. 116 Squadron was renumbered to 115 Squadron on 21 August 1958.
- No. 151 Squadron RAF reformed here on 1 January 1962 being designated from the Signals Development Squadron. 151 Squadron operated the Lincoln B.2, Hastings C.1 & C.2, Varsity T.1 and the Canberra B.2 before being disbanded on 25 May 1963 still at Watton.
- No. 192 Squadron RAF reformed at Watton on 15 July 1951. The squadron operated the Mosquito PR 34, Lincoln B.2, Boeing Washington B.1, Canberra B.2 & B.6, Varsity T.1 and the Comet C.2(R). 192 Squadron were disbanded on 21 August 1958 still at Watton.
- No. 199 Squadron RAF reformed here on 15 July 1951 operating the Lincoln B.2 and the Mosquito NF 36 before moving to RAF Hemswell on 17 April 1952.
- No. 245 Squadron RAF reformed at Watton on 21 August 1958 with the Canberra B.2 before moving to RAF Tangmere on 25 August 1958.
- No. 263 Squadron RAF operated Bristol Bloodhound I anti-aircraft missiles from 1 June 1959 to 30 June 1963.
- No. 360 Squadron RAF formed here on 23 September 1966 with the Canberra B.2, B.6 and T.17 before moving to RAF Cottesmore on 21 April 1969.
- No. 527 Squadron RAF reformed here on 1 August 1952 as a redesignation of 'R' Calibration Squadron. The squadron operated the Mosquito B.35, Anson C.19, Lincoln B.2, Gloster Meteor NF 11 & NF 14, Varsity T.1, Canberra B.2 & PR 7 and the Meteor NF 11 before being disbanded here on 21 August 1958.
- No. 24 (Air Defence Missile) Wing RAF
- No. 2724 Squadron RAF Regiment
- No. 4038 Anti-Aircraft Flight RAF Regiment
- No. 4179 Anti-Aircraft Flight RAF Regiment
- No. 4183 Anti-Aircraft Flight RAF Regiment
- No. 4219 Anti-Aircraft Flight RAF Regiment
- No. 4220 Anti-Aircraft Flight RAF Regiment
- Air Defence Missile Operations Training School (January 1960 – January 1961) became the Surface-to-Air Missile Operational Training School (June 1961 – January 1964)
- Electronic Warfare Engineering and Training Unit (January 1971)
- Electronic Warfare Support Wing (July 1965 – April 1969) became Electronic Warfare Support Unit (April 1969 – January 1971)
- Ground Controlled Approach Operators School (September 1946 – March 1952)
- Radio Warfare Establishment (April 1945 – September 1946) became CSE
- RAF Watton Flying Club.
- Signals Command Air Radio Laboratories (July 1965 – January 1969) became Signals Air Radio Laboratories (January 1969 – January 1971)

By the 1970s, the aircraft at Watton had been replaced by technology and, at the beginning of 1973, the Matelo system of HF communication was supplied to Strike Command by Marconi Communications Systems.

In 1969, 1970, 1989 and 1990 RAF Watton was the location of the annual Royal Observer Corps summer training camps when up to 400 observers per week attended specialist training. For the latter two years Watton had already closed for active RAF use and was on a care and maintenance basis, temporary support catering and security staff being drafted in from nearby stations to support the ROC presence.

With the installation of secondary surveillance radar (SSR) at Watton, the station became one of the five units in the joint military/civil National Air Traffic Services Organisation with Eastern Radar until the 1980s. Then in the 1990s, the airfield came into use by the Army in connection with the nearby Stanford Training Area (STANTA). In December 1990 Hockley Estate Agents on behalf of Defence Estates put up for sale the entire 157 post war NCO Married Quarter site located on the south side of the Norwich Road. The successful tenderer was Roger Byron-Collins' Welbeck Estate Group who, since 1980, has acquired 36 former MOD sites from HM Government including near to Watton the MOD sites at RAF West Raynham and RAF Sculthorpe. This entire married quarter estate were subsequently developed by Wallsend Properties.

The site was home to 611 VGS (Volunteer Gliding Squadron) flying Viking Gliders for the Air Cadet Organisation. 611 VGS ceased operations in April 2012, following the sale of most of the airfield to private landowners.

== Current use ==
A large part of the site has been developed into the Blenheim Grange housing estate, which is actually officially part of Carbrooke.

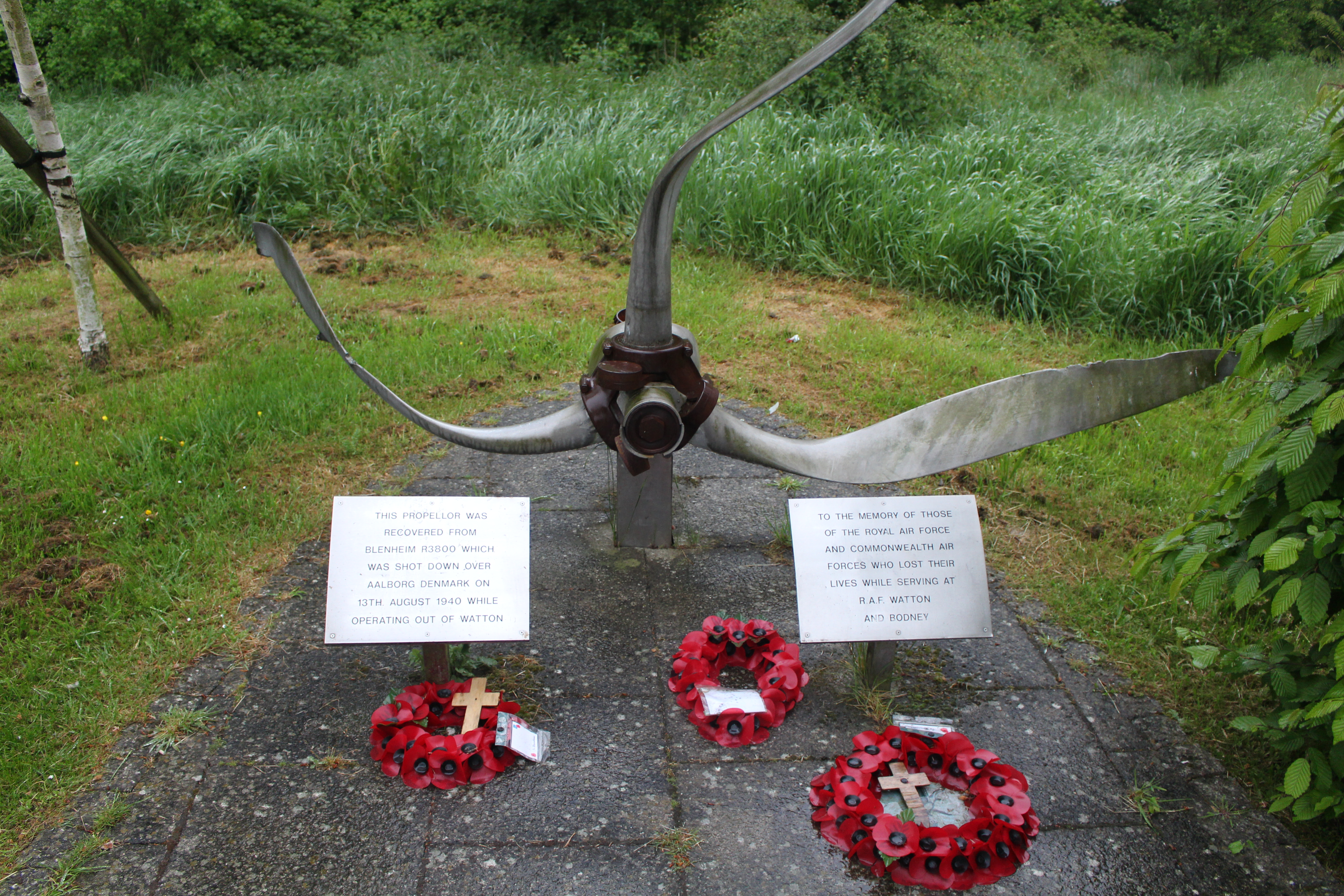
A memorial to airmen at the entrance to the former Watton RAF base, Washington Drive, Watton, Norfolk, UK

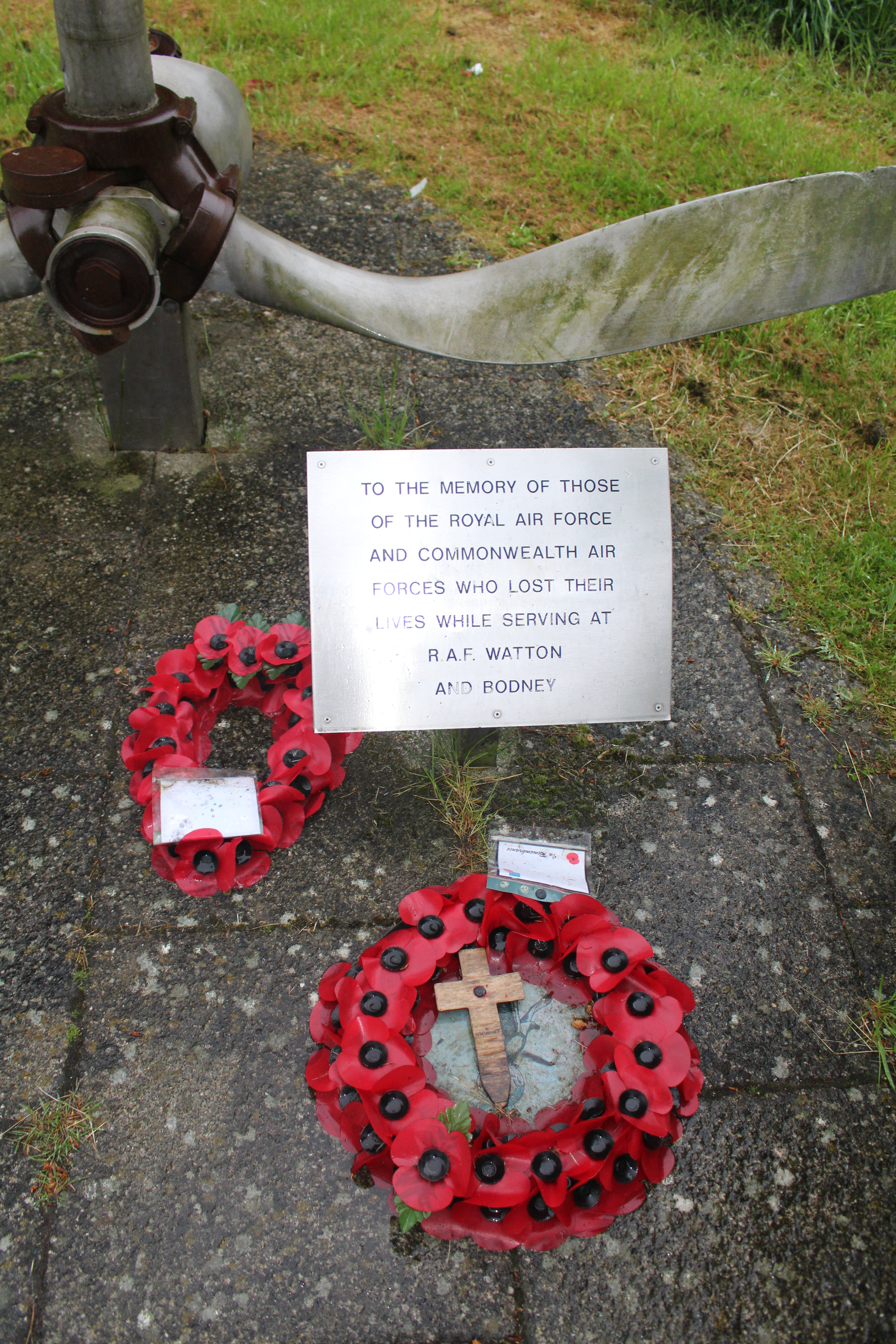
A memorial to airmen at the entrance to the former Watton RAF base, Washington Drive, Watton, Norfolk, UK

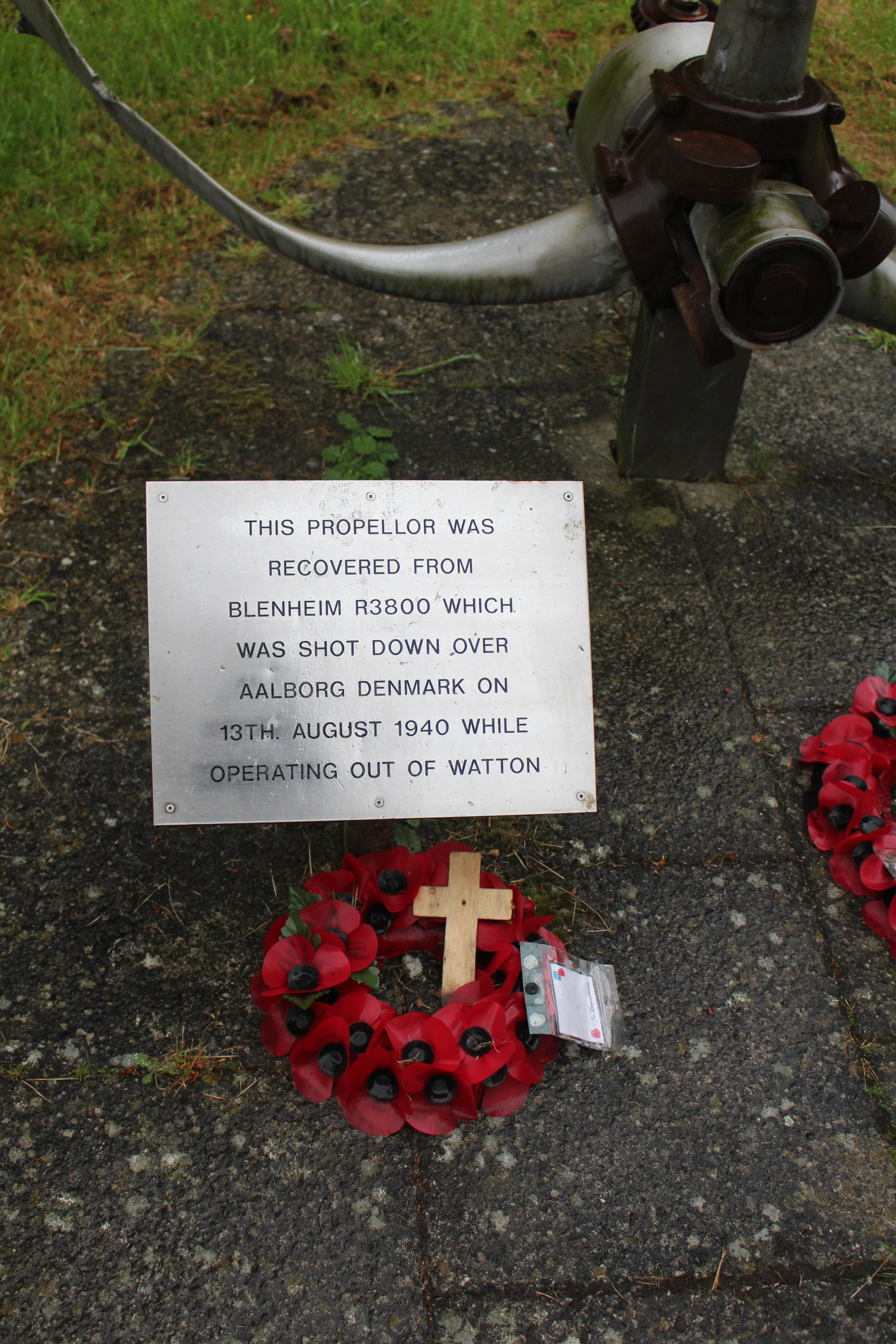
A memorial to airmen at the entrance to the former Watton RAF base, Washington Drive, Watton, Norfolk, UK

== See also ==
- List of former Royal Air Force stations
