= No. 10 Air Experience Flight RAF =

10 Air Experience Flight
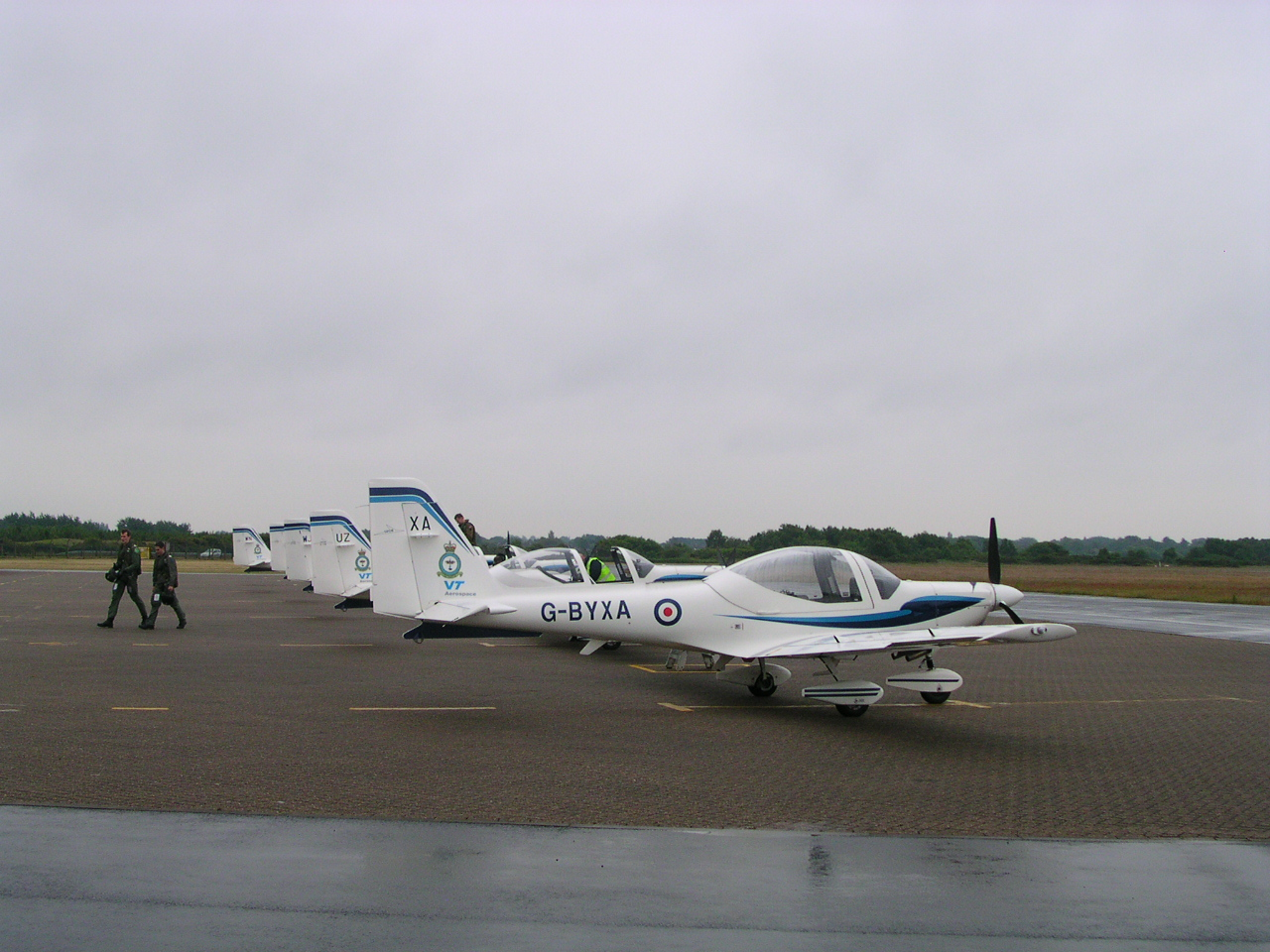
- Grob Tutor aircraft of 10 Air Experience Flight in June 2008 at RAF Woodvale
- Active: 8 September 1958 - Present
- Country: United Kingdom
- Allegiance: Royal Air Force
- Branch: No. 6 Flying Training School RAF
- Role: Training
- Garrison/HQ: RAF Woodvale

Commanders
- Station Commander: Squadron Leader M Barrett
- OC 10 AEF: Gapped

Aircraft flown
- Trainer: Grob Tutor

10 Air Experience Flight (AEF) is one of thirteen such units run by 6 Flying Training School of the Royal Air Force. It was formed in the 1950s, along with other AEFs, to teach basic flying to members of the Air Training Corps (ATC), Combined Cadet Force (CCF) (Royal Air Force) Section. (Note: It has been known for cadets from other sections of the CCF to fly with the AEFs if space allows and occasionally to allow the Girls Venture Corps Air Cadets and the Air Scouts to participate) It mainly flies cadets from the local wings of Cumbria and Lancashire Wing (the Lancashire sectors only as the Cumbrian sectors use 11 AEF at RAF Leeming, due to the distance from RAF Woodvale), Greater Manchester Wing, Merseyside Wing, No. 2 Welsh Wing and CCF contingents.

== History ==
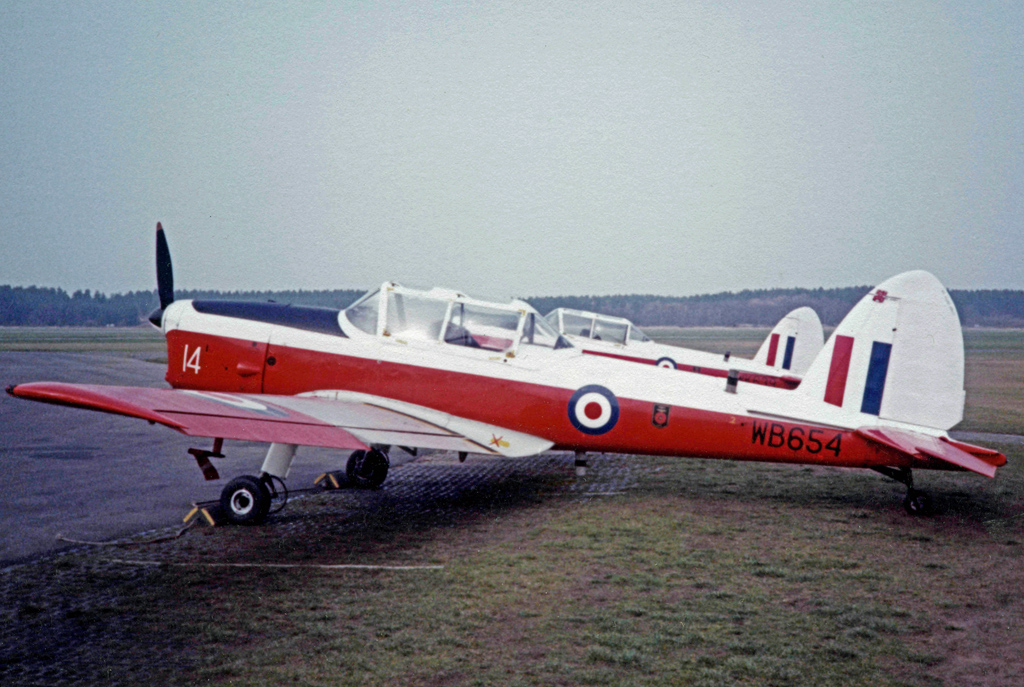
No.10 AEF Chipmunk T.10 aircraft at RAF Woodvale in 1983

10 AEF was raised on 8 September 1958 at RAF Woodvale, which is located near Southport. It is one of the few AEFs that has not been moved to another location or temporarily disbanded and later reformed. In 1996 10 AEF was placed under the command of Manchester and Salford Universities Air Squadron (UAS), one of the two UAS' to operate out of Woodvale, the other being Liverpool University Air Squadron.

10 AEF fly the Grob Tutor aircraft, which it gained in 2001; prior to that it was equipped with the Scottish Aviation Bulldog from 1996 and the de Havilland Canada DHC-1 Chipmunk from 1958 - 1996. In both cases where the Air Experience Flights have updated their aircraft, 10 AEF has been the last to receive their new mounts. 10 AEF, like all AEFs, no longer own their own aircraft but use other machines from the two UAS' at RAF Woodvale.

From April 2017 to May 2019 flying was suspended due to infrastructure issues. The main runway was rebuilt in early 2019 and flying resumed in May.

== Permanent staff ==
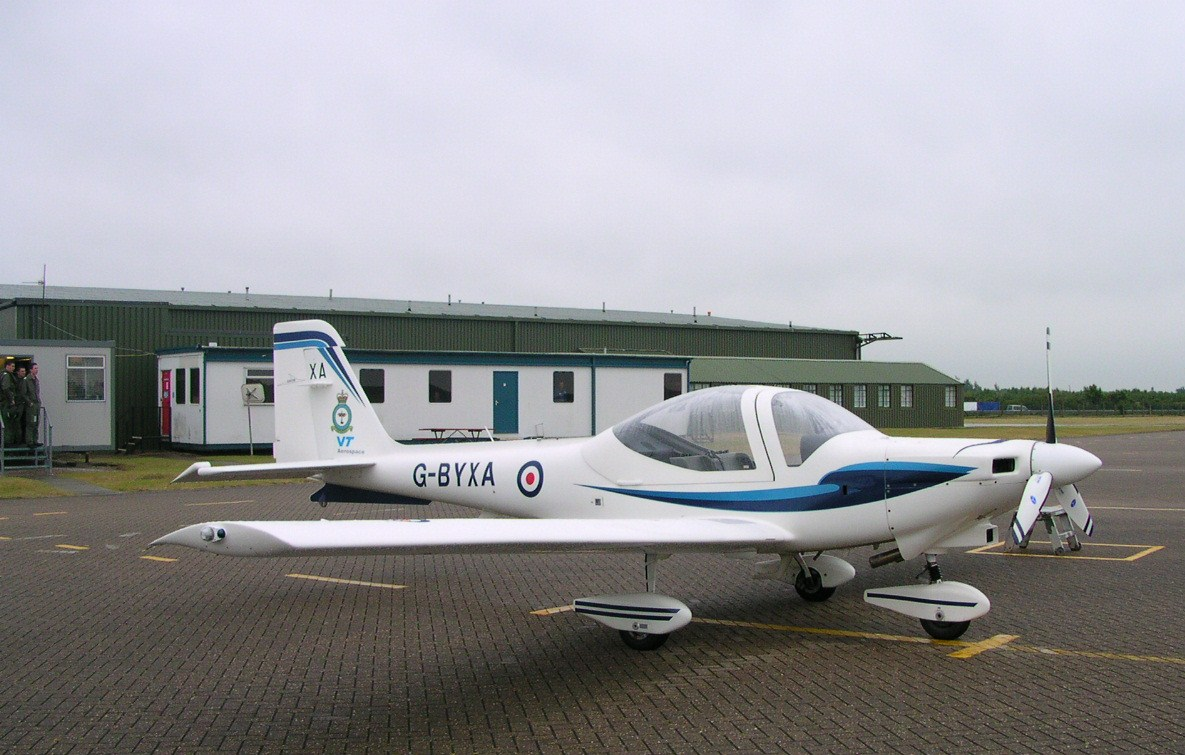
A 10 AEF Grob Tutor with hangar in the background at RAF Woodvale.

10 AEF has a team of professional pilots both military and civilian, who fly the cadets. Pilots apply to join an AEF through Headquarters Air Cadets and undergo security and Criminal Records Bureau checks (which all ACO adult staff have every five years). A pilot may continue with an AEF until he or she is aged 65. On appointment pilots will be commissioned (if not regular pilots) as Flying Officers in the RAF Reserve, resulting in retired senior and air officers holding the rank of Flying Officer for work with AEFs and a much higher rank for other duties. 10 AEF also has several Flight Lieutenants, one of whom is appointed the Officer Commanding (OC). Past AEF flight commanders have held the rank of Squadron Leader, the last being Sqn Ldr Martin Mayer RAF(R), a former OC of the Empire Test Pilot School at MoD Boscombe Down. Sqn Ldr Mayer was responsible for updating the aircraft from Chipmunks to Bulldogs in 1996 and Bulldogs to Tutors in 2001, in both cases 10AEF was the last unit to be upgraded. 10 AEF is unique in being the first to have a Squadron Adjutant in post.

10 AEF is assisted by a team of Survival Equipment Fitters (occasionally referred to as Squippers), from Babcock International; all have previous regular military service. Their responsibilities are to service the aircraft, issue the cadets their flying equipment and to check the cadets are secured into the aircraft.

Occasionally 10 AEF receives holding officers from the RAF waiting for their trade course to start. For their tenure at the AEF they are generally placed on the Flight Staff Team, or if an officer is undergoing pilot training and has already completed some of their pilot training, they will sometimes fly cadets.

== Flight staff ==
In addition to pilots and Survival Equipment Fitters, there are also a team of Flight Staff Cadets (FSCs) and Adult Flight Staff, who are commanded by the Officer in Charge Flight Staff (OICFS), a RAFAC officer/SNCO who answers to the OC. The OICFS organises the daily rota for the duty flight staff, he is also responsible for the selecting of new flight staff and making sure former members return their kit.

Potential flight staff usually have to be of at least Cadet Corporal rank and Master Cadet Classification (for ATC cadets) and Cadet Junior Corporal and Proficiency 3 Classification (For CCF RAF Cadets), some exceptions to this rule have been made in the past, but are rare. They are normally drawn from the local ATC squadrons or CCF units within a reasonable traveling distance. Applications are to be made in writing and potential Flight Staff are interviewed by the OC Flight Staff or sometimes the OC; if appointed they will serve a probationary period of about three months.

After a probationary period flight staff are issued a set of flying kit, comprising flight jacket/cold weather jacket (olive green), white knee-boards and clear plastic covers (for recording details in the aircraft or on the taxiway), flying gloves (white), flying suit, aircrew socks and aircrew roll neck top and no1 RAF airmans/ airwomens cap. Boots (not necessarily the flying type, but these are preferred) and unit/name badges are worn by both Pilots and Flight Staff. The 10 AEF unit badge is worn on the upper right arm and the name tape is worn on the left hand side of the chest.

Members of the Flight Staff Team attend the days when 10 AEF are flying cadets; it will usually be at the weekend, where a group of 50 cadets from an ATC Wing will fly per day. Non-AC flights are usually smaller and generally serve CCF units or ATC Sqnadrons organised special slots. These run from Tuesday to Friday and are less likely to be assisted by flight staff who are usually either in education or work. Their responsibilities are to conduct the briefing before any cadets fly, assist with the running of the flight, maintain the flying log, make sure the cadets get to the aircraft safely and look after the safety and maintain the discipline of visiting cadets and staff whilst on the ground.
