= RAF Wratting Common =

Former Royal Air Force station in Suffolk, England

RAF Wratting Common RAF West Wickham
- Near West Wickham, Cambridgeshire in England

Site information
- Type: Royal Air Force station
- Code: WW
- Owner: Air Ministry
- Operator: Royal Air Force
- Controlled by: RAF Bomber Command * No. 3 Group RAF * No. 7 (T) Group RAF

Location
- Shown within Cambridgeshire RAF Wratting Common (the United Kingdom)
- Coordinates: 52°07′30″N 000°24′05″E

Site history
- Built: 1942/43
- In use: May 1943 - April 1946
- Battles/wars: European theatre of World War II

Airfield information
- Elevation: 119 metres (390 ft) AMSL
Runways
Direction	Length and surface
00/00	Concrete
00/00	Concrete
00/00	Concrete

Royal Air Force Wratting Common or more simply RAF Wratting Common is a former Royal Air Force station in Suffolk, north of Haverhill and southeast of Cambridge, England.

== Units ==
The following units were here at some point:

- No. 24 Heavy Glider Maintenance Section
- No. 90 Squadron RAF between May and October 1943 with the Short Stirling III and the Avro Lancasters I and III
- No. 195 Squadron RAF between November 1944 and August 1945 with the Lancasters I and III
- No. 116 Storage Sub Site of No. 273 Maintenance Unit RAF between July 1946 and September 1947
- No. 2 Section of No. 1552 Radio Aids Training Flight between March and July 1946
- No. 1651 Heavy Conversion Unit RAF between November 1943 and November 1944
