= Universities of Wales Air Squadron =

University flying squadron of the Royal Air Force

Universities of Wales Air Squadron RAFVR
- Active: 1963–present
- Role: Training, Recruiting
- Part of: No. 6 Flying Training School
- Garrison/HQ: MOD St Athan
- Equipment: Grob Tutor T1

The Universities of Wales Air Squadron is a University Air Squadron of the Royal Air Force's Volunteer Reserve for students from Cardiff University, Cardiff Metropolitan University, Swansea University, University of Wales Trinity Saint David, University of South Wales, Glamorgan University, and Aberystwyth University. It was founded in 1963.

== Alumni ==
- Flt Lt Keren Cavaciuti, of Usk, had qualified with Flying Officer Helen Dobbs, formerly of the East Midlands Universities Air Squadron, the RAF's first fighter pilot in June 1993 from RAF Chivenor, when aged 25; as Squadron Leader Keren Watkins she was the only British female Jaguar pilot, with 54 Sqn, later rejoining the RAF as a flight instructor
- Flt Lt Michael Bowden, Cardiff University, joined the RAF in 2002, Red Arrows from 2014, aged 33

== See also ==
- University Air Squadron units
- University Royal Naval Unit, the Royal Navy equivalent
- Officers Training Corps, the British Army equivalent
- List of Royal Air Force aircraft squadrons
