= East of Scotland Universities Air Squadron =

University flying squadron of the Royal Air Force

- ESUAS badge
- Active: 2003–present
- Part of: No. 6 Flying Training School RAF
- Garrison/HQ: Leuchars Station
- Motto: Cuide Laidire (Gaelic: Together Stronger)
- Equipment: Grob Tutor T.1

Insignia
- Identification symbol: Two lions rampant holding an open book with the Saltire in the background

The East of Scotland Universities Air Squadron (Scottish Gaelic: Sguadron Adhair Oilthighean Taobh an Ear na h-Alba), commonly known as ESUAS, is a squadron within the Royal Air Force established in 2003 as an amalgamation of "East Lowlands Universities Air Squadron" (ELUAS) and "Aberdeen, Dundee and St Andrews Universities Air Squadron" (ADStAUAS). It is based at Leuchars Station (Royal Air Force Leuchars until 31 March 15 when it was transferred to Army control), in Fife and flies a fleet of six Grob Tutor aircraft. ESUAS is the parent Squadron of No. 12 Air Experience Flight RAF, who share the aircraft.

A squadron leader is the commanding officer and ESUAS has another two qualified flying instructors, one of whom is the chief ground instructor, and the other is the ground training instructor. There are some 90 students, 20 civilian support staff who are contracted from Babcock, plus an adjutant and two civilian admin staff.

Students apply to join ESUAS at their university's Freshers' Fair and then undergo a selection process. If successful they are attested and join the Royal Air Force Volunteer Reserve as an Officer Cadet symbolised by a white rank tab. Normally, students are recruited for a period of two years. Currently, ESUAS recruit from ten academic institutions in Eastern Scotland: Aberdeen, Abertay, Dundee, Edinburgh, Heriot-Watt, Napier, Perth, QMU, RGU, and St Andrews.

ESUAS' flying syllabus allows students to progress to achieve their PFB (Preliminary Flying Badge), along the way flying solo. Other activities include Sports, Adventurous Training, Charity, Engagement, Green's Training and a healthy social scene.

The aim of ESUAS, like other University Air Squadrons is to let young people experience life in the Royal Air Force, without commitment to regular service and to provide training in the fields mentioned. ESUAS also parents sponsored students, on cadetships or bursaries, who will go on to join the RAF.

== History ==
In 1925, as part of the creation of reserve forces for the relatively new Royal Air Force, Lord Trenchard instituted a Volunteer Reserve air squadron at Cambridge University to encourage suitable young men of good education to join the newly formed Royal Air Force – or at least look upon it with favour when they formed the ranks of government or occupied other high echelons of society. That was followed three weeks later by the creation of a similar squadron at Oxford and in 1935 a third squadron at the University of London. Then, in 1940, because of the attrition of aircrew and the need to recruit replacements and expand their numbers, Aberdeen University Air Squadron was created, along with those at the other three ancient Scottish universities and some older English ones, as part of the expansion of the RAF Reserve to prepare undergraduate men volunteering for aircrew duties for call-up for war service. At least two of these squadrons, Aberdeen and St Andrews, also provided short direct entry initial (officer) aircrew training course centres for non-undergraduates – mainly older and mainly English public schoolboys – who did not attend university as such but went on to aircrew training centres at the end of their six-month course.

After discussions with the university’s newly created Military Education Committee headed by the principal, recruiting for AUAS began in earnest under its first CO, Wing Commander Streatfield, temporarily rested from his post as CO of one of the Blenheim bomber squadrons then based at the newly created RAF Dyce. Among others to join him later as instructors were Professor Edward M. Wright, later principal of the university and at the time the head of the university’s Maths Department and himself ex-Oxford UAS who later joined the codebreakers at Bletchley Park, and Dr Potter, one of his Maths Department staff. Before long, several of the university’s undergraduates had joined the squadron and were duly called up into active service – mainly as pilots or navigators or flight engineers. Some, a number of whose names appear in the Squadron history and photo albums now held in the university library, were killed in action. Many others returned at the end of the war to complete their studies and graduate. At least three of the young men who joined as soon as they were able to on 23 January 1941 after being founded at Marischal College of Aberdeen University, flying from Dyce airport before moving in December 1941 to Leuchars and combining with Edinburgh and Glasgow UASs on 26 July 1944 before reforming at Dyce in October 1946 as part of 66 Group before moving to Leuchars again on 3 October 1981 while part of 25 Group.

After the war, the Air Ministry decided to disband all University Air Squadrons since the Service now had too many aircrew and recruits were no longer needed. However, the University of Aberdeen’s Military Education Committee, led by the principal, Sir William Fyffe-Hamilton, strongly disagreed with that proposal, believing that the UAS was a good thing for the university. Sir William went to London and persuaded the Air Ministry with much conviction that they were wrong, therefore almost single-handedly saving the entire University Air Squadron part of the Royal Air Force Volunteer Reserve, which now reverted to its role of encouraging young men of good education to consider joining the RAF as pilots or navigators or at least to become air-minded. Flying training up to the standard of the rest of the RAFVR was instituted and resulted in many members joining the full-time service.

Over the years, many able personnel, male and female, of several disciplines entered the Service in greater numbers than many other UASs - many achieving the highest ranks - and flew almost all the aircraft ever to have been operated by it. In recognition of that, in 1966 virtually the entire Air Staff, led by the Chief of the Air Staff, Air Chief Marshal Sir Charles Elworthy, attended the squadron’s 25th Anniversary Dinner in Elphinstone Hall, a rare honour, arriving together at Dyce from London in an RAF Transport Command Comet IV.

In 1957 the rest of the RAFVR was finally disbanded, leaving the University Air Squadrons as the sole remaining part of the RAFVR.

In 1980, Aberdeen Airport was getting too busy, and the Aberdeen unit was looking to move. In November 1980 the unit moved to Leuchars, when it had four aircraft.

In 1981, because of the reduction of the Service generally, Aberdeen UAS was amalgamated with the resurrected St Andrews – now including the new Dundee University – University Air Squadron and then in 2003 was further amalgamated with the UAS serving the Edinburgh universities to form the current squadron East of Scotland UAS, now based at RAF Leuchars.

== Incidents ==
- November 1947, squadron instructor Flt Lt Donald James Ott Loudon DFC crashed Spitfire 'SL611' on Great End in the Lake District; the aircraft was only recovered in May 1997 by a RAF Puma
- On Saturday 10 May 1952 DHC-1 Chipmunk aircraft WB729 crashed two miles north of Tarves near Haddo House. Both occupants were killed, 21 year old John Lawrie, and Sqn Ldr Hallam, who had been at Stalag Luft III, and the commanding officer of Aberdeen University Air Squadron.
- Saturday 3 May 1975, a 37 year old died, of Kirk Brae, of Cults, Aberdeen
- Saturday 20 February 1982 at 9.30am, both pilots from Aberdeen and Dundee Air Squadron abandoned the aircraft, 'XX662', which crashed 300 yds from Radernie Primary School in Cameron, Fife. Sqn Ldr Martin Common, of 11 Lochside, Denmore Park, Bridge of Don, the Commanding Officer, and Flt Lt Duncan Ross were picked up by a Westland Wessex at Peat Inn

== Alumni ==
=== East Lowlands Universities Air Squadron ===
- Air Vice-Marshal Fin Monahan DFC
- Air Marshal Iain McNicoll CBE FRAeS, Station Commander of RAF Bruggen in 1998

=== Edinburgh University Air Squadron ===
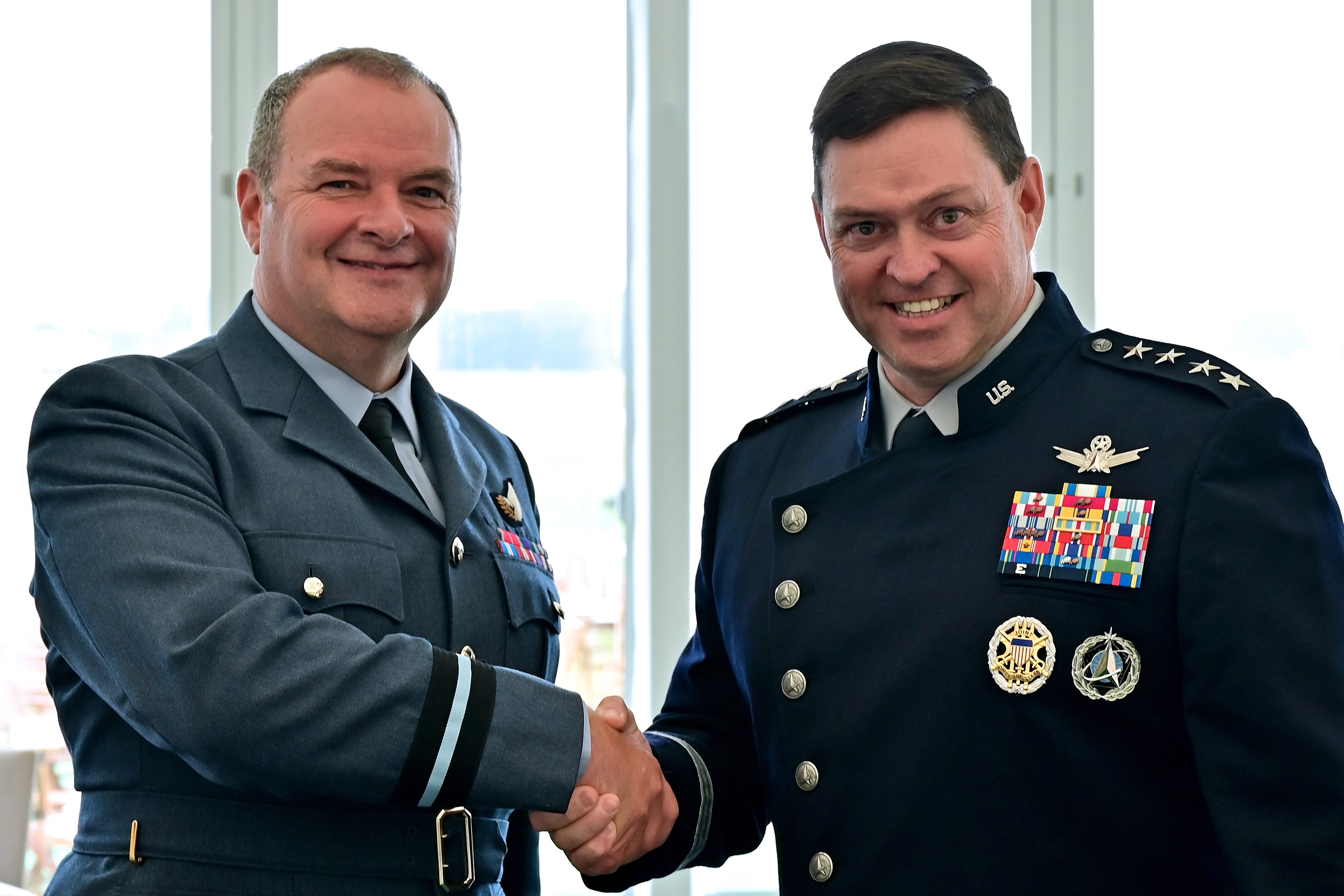
Blythe Crawford (left)

- Stephen Blizzard
- Air Commodore Blythe Crawford CBE, Commandant of the Air and Space Warfare Centre, when a Flt Lt in 1998, he flew as a navigator with Sqn Ldr Andy Green, shortly after the land speed record had been broken by Sqn Ldr Green, on the Tornado F3 with 111 Sqn at RAF Leuchars
- Ron Flockhart (racing driver) in 1940, studied Engineering at the University of Edinburgh, a REME officer in the war
- Sqn Ldr Elle Hillard, a female Tornado squadron leader at 31 Sqn at RAF Marham

== Staff ==
The Principal of the University of Aberdeen, Sir E. M. Wright flew with the unit

== See also ==
- Armed forces in Scotland
- Military history of Scotland
- University Air Squadron units
- List of Royal Air Force aircraft squadrons

=== Affiliate Organisations ===
- University Service Units, the umbrella that the URNU, UOTC and UAS fall under
  - University Royal Naval Unit, the Royal Navy equivalent
    - University Royal Naval Unit East Scotland, the Royal Navy counterpart
  - Officers Training Corps, the British Army equivalent
    - Tayforth UOTC, the British Army counterpart in St Andrews, Dundee and Stirling
