= Pilot officer =

Military rank

Pilot officer (Plt Off) is a junior officer rank used by some air forces, with origins from the Royal Air Force. The rank is used by air forces of many countries that have historical British influence.

Pilot officer is the lowest ranking commissioned officer immediately below flying officer. It is usually equivalent to the rank of second lieutenant in other services.

The equivalent rank in the Women's Auxiliary Air Force (WAAF) was "company assistant", later renamed to "assistant section officer".

== Canada ==
The rank was used in the Royal Canadian Air Force until the 1968 unification of the Canadian Forces, when army-type rank titles were adopted. Canadian pilot officers then became second lieutenants. In official Canadian French usage, the rank title was sous-lieutenant d'aviation.

== United Kingdom ==
Pilot officer
- Shoulder and sleeve insignia
- Country: United Kingdom
- Service branch: Royal Air Force
- Abbreviation: Plt Off / PLTOFF
- Rank group: Junior officers
- NATO rank code: OF-1
- Formation: August 1919 (RAF)
- Next higher rank: Flying officer
- Next lower rank: Acting pilot officer
- Equivalent ranks: Second lieutenant (British Army; RM); Midshipman (RN) (Note: Junior to both military and air force rank)

Related articles
- History: Royal Naval Air Service

=== Origins ===
In the Royal Flying Corps, officers were designated pilot officers at the end of pilot training. As they retained their commissions in their customary ranks (usually second lieutenant or lieutenant), and many of them had been seconded from their ground units, the designation of pilot officer was a position title rather than a rank.

On 1 April 1918, the newly created RAF adopted its officer rank titles from the British Army, with Royal Flying Corps second lieutenants becoming second lieutenants in the RAF. Consideration was given to renaming second lieutenants as ensigns. However, when the RAF's own rank structure was introduced in August 1919, RAF second lieutenants who were qualified pilots were re-designated as pilot officers, a rank which has been in continuous use ever since. Those who were not qualified pilots were redesignated observer officers, but this was later phased out and all officers of this rank became pilot officers.

=== RAF usage ===
The rank of pilot officer does not imply that the officer is aircrew. Following reforms to the Royal Air Force's promotion system, wherein previously, university graduates passed out of RAF Cranwell at a higher substantive rank than their non-graduate peers, pilot officer rank is now only applicable to ground branches. Aircrew and engineers receive their commissions as flying officers and skip the rank altogether. A ground branch officer will remain in the pilot officer rank for six months following commissioning, before an automatic promotion to flying officer. Because of the nature of phase II training (professional training after the phase I initial officer training), a pilot officer will generally spend time in rank on a further training course, and is not likely to be operationally active.

Some students in the University Air Squadrons are promoted to the rank of acting pilot officer (which includes a week-long course at RAF Cranwell) as part of the leadership element of their squadron. UAS students wear pilot officer rank insignia with officer's headdress and are commissioned into the Volunteer Reserve. Pilot officers are more likely to be found in the CCF and Air Training Corps organisations of the VR(T) branch, because they are likely to spend far longer in rank than those serving in the RAF.

=== Insignia ===
The rank insignia consists of a thin blue band on slightly wider black band. This is worn on both the lower sleeves of the tunic or on the shoulders of the flying suit or the casual uniform.

Although no current Royal Navy rank has an insignia of a single half width ring, a pilot officer's mess insignia of one thin band of gold running around each cuff is similar to the insignia formerly worn by Royal Navy warrant officers. As with the mess insignia for other RAF officer ranks, the band of gold does not have the Royal Navy's loop.

An RAF pilot officer's sleeve/shoulder insignia

An RAF pilot officer's sleeve mess insignia

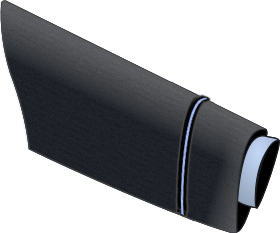
An RAF pilot officer's sleeve on No.1 best dress uniform

== Gallery ==
(Royal Australian Air Force)

(Bangladesh Air Force)

(Ghana Air Force)

(Indian Air Force)

(Namibian Air Force)

(Nigerian Air Force)

(Pakistan Air Force)

(Sri Lanka Air Force)

(Royal Air Force)

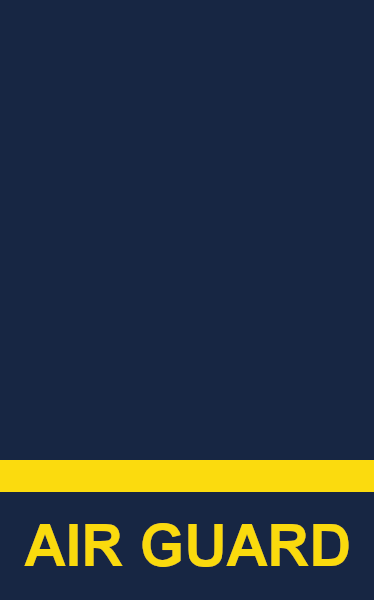
(Trinidad and Tobago Air Guard)

== See also ==
- Air force officer rank insignia
- British and U.S. military ranks compared
- Comparative military ranks
- RAF officer ranks
- Ranks of the RAAF
