= Acting pilot officer =

Rank of commissioned officer in the UK RAF

- Shoulder and sleeve insignia
- Country: United Kingdom
- Service branch: Royal Air Force
- Abbreviation: APO
- Rank group: Junior officers
- NATO rank code: OF-1
- Non-NATO rank: O-1(A)
- Formation: 1 April 1918 (RAF)
- Next higher rank: Pilot officer
- Next lower rank: Warrant officer
- Equivalent ranks: Second lieutenant (British Army; RM) (Note: Senior to air force rank); Midshipman (RN)

Related articles
- History: Royal Naval Air Service

Acting pilot officer (APO) is the lowest commissioned grade in the Royal Air Force. Acting pilot officer is not an actual military rank; therefore, acting pilot officers are regraded to pilot officer instead of receiving a promotion. Unlike other RAF ranks that officers may hold in an acting capacity, acting pilot officer is maintained as a separate grade.

Although acting pilot officer has a NATO ranking code of OF(D), neither the British Army, Royal Marines nor Royal Navy has an exactly equivalent rank. As acting pilot officers are junior to second lieutenants in the British Army or the Royal Marines and to Royal Navy midshipmen, the rank is the most junior commissioned rank in the British Armed Forces.

On a University Air Squadron, students can apply for the position of acting pilot officer in order to undertake a senior student or flight commander role, usually four per each UAS. In order to be awarded a Volunteer Reserve commission they have to complete a course run by the Officer and Aircrew Cadet Training Unit at RAFC Cranwell. On graduation, Royal Air Force Volunteer Reserve acting pilot officers hold a full commission for one year. This can be extended if serving for more than one year in a senior position on squadron or retained if serving the RAF reserves.

Up to 2012, 3 Flying Training School (3FTS) was responsible for the training of UAS APOs. However, starting in 2013 OACTU took over the duties of training acting pilot officers with a course aligned with the commissioning course of the RAF reserves.

The rank insignia is identical to that of a pilot officer, consisting of a thin blue band on slightly wider black band. This is worn on both the lower sleeves of the tunic or on the shoulders of the flying suit or the casual uniform. RAFVR APOs have a VR marking on their rank slides, either a small brass VR pin mounted on the stripe or embroidered underneath.

Officers of the Royal Air Force Air Cadets are ranked as acting pilot officers until completion of their Officers' Initial Course at RAFC Cranwell.

An RAF acting pilot officer's sleeve insignia

An RAF acting pilot officer's sleeve mess insignia

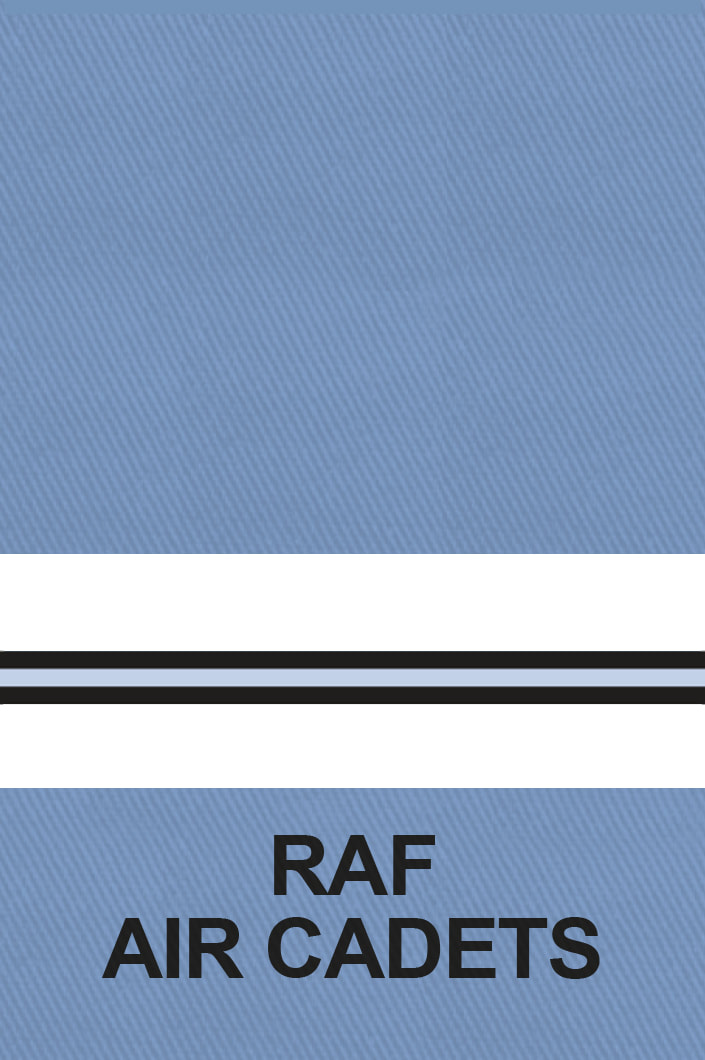
A RAFAC Acting Pilot Officer's shoulder insignia

== See also ==
- Air force officer rank insignia
- British and U.S. military ranks compared
- Comparative military ranks
- RAF officer ranks
- Ranks of the RAAF
