= Windrush =

Windrush may refer to:

== Places in England ==
- Windrush Square, precinct in south London
- River Windrush, a river in Gloucestershire
- Windrush, Gloucestershire, a village in Gloucestershire
  - RAF Windrush, a Royal Air Force station in World War II

== Other uses ==
- HMT Empire Windrush, a ship emblematic of postwar immigration of West Indian people to the UK
- Windrush Day, a commemoration in the United Kingdom held on 22 June to honour the contributions of migrants to the post-war economy.
- "Windrush generation", people of British African-Caribbean heritage
- Windrush line, a railway line in London named for the Windrush generation
- Windrush scandal, 2018, in which some of the "Windrush generation" were wrongly deported from Britain as illegal immigrants
- Windrush (TV series), 1998, a BBC TV documentary marking the 50th anniversary of the first immigration disembarkation to Britain from the ship
