= No. 6 Flying Training School RAF =

Flying Training School of the Royal Air Force

No. 6 Flying Training School
- School badge
- Active: 1920 – present
- Country: United Kingdom
- Branch: Royal Air Force
- Type: Flying training school
- Role: University Air Squadrons and Air Experience Flights
- Part of: RAF College Cranwell
- Headquarters: RAF Cranwell
- Mottos: Aspice et imitare (Latin for 'Look and imitate')
- Aircraft: Grob Tutor T1

Commanders
- Current commander: Group Captain Jake McAllister

No. 6 Flying Training School RAF is a Flying Training School (FTS) within No. 22 (Training) Group of the Royal Air Force that delivers flying training to University Air Squadrons and Air Experience Flights.

== History ==
The school was formed by renaming No. 39 Training School RAF at RAF Spitalgate on 26 April 1920 under No. 3 Group RAF, using Avro 504Ks and other aircraft until moving to RAF Manston on 21 September 1920 under control of the School of Technical Training RAF. The school was disbanded on 1 April 1922.

The school was reformed on 1 April 1935 upon No. 23 Group RAF. After moving from RAF Netheravon, the school became the first flying unit at RAF Little Rissington in August 1938 with Hawker Audaxes, Hawker Furies, Hawker Harts and Avro Ansons. It was renamed to No. 6 Service Flying Training School on 3 September 1939 and North American Harvards joined. The School's Advanced Training Squadron used various airfields for armament training such as RAF Penrhos and RAF Warmwell. The School's Initial Training Squadron used RAF Kidlington, RAF Windrush, RAF Chipping Norton and RAF Hullavington. Airspeed Oxfords joined from November 1940 and the unit was disbanded by being redesignated No. 6 (Pilots) Advanced Flying Unit RAF on 1 April 1942.

=== No. 6 (Pilots) Advanced Flying Unit RAF ===
The unit was formed at Little Rissington under 23 Group and used Ansons, Oxfords, Harvard and Blackburn Bothas. The unit used multiple airfields such as RAF Windrush, RAF Chipping Norton, RAF Akeman Street and RAF Moreton Valence as relief landing grounds along with RAF Honiley and RAF Chedworth for detachment locations. It became 6 SFTS on 17 December 1945.

The unit was reformed back to No. 6 SFTS at RAF Little Rissington on 17 December 1945 with Harvards, Ansons and Miles Magisters. From 30 April 1946, 6 FTS was based at RAF Ternhill equipped with North American Harvards and de Havilland Tiger Moths and unit was renamed back to 6 FTS on 14 May 1947. The school received Percival Prentices in late 1948; from July 1953 Percival Provost T.1 piston engine training aircraft replaced both types. During this period the school used RAF Akeman Street, RAF Southrop, RAF Chetwynd, RAF Sleap and RAF High Ercall. On 24 July 1961 the school moved out to RAF Acklington where the Hunting Aircraft Jet Provost T.3 was introduced and RAF Ouston was the satellite airfield.The school was renamed to No. 6 (Advanced) Flying School RAF during December 1966, it closed again on 30 June 1968.

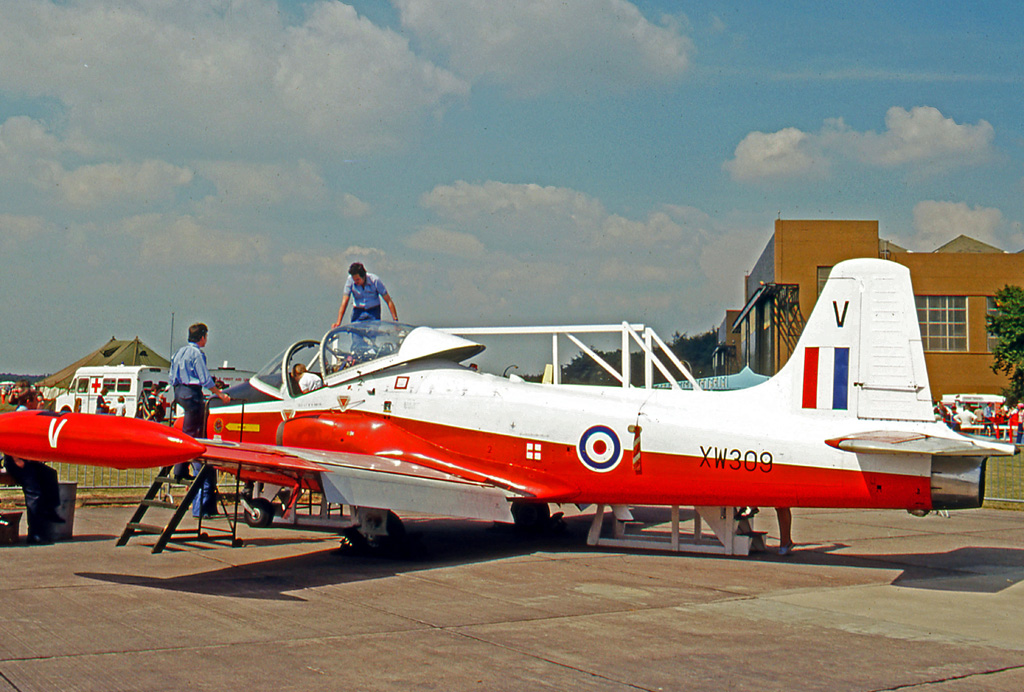
Operational Jet Provost T.5 of No.6 Flying Training School in 1977

=== No. 6 Flying Training School RAF ===
The School reformed on 1 May 1970 at RAF Finningley, within No. 23 Group RAF as an Air Navigation School (ANS). This was an amalgamation of the Hawker Siddeley Dominie T.1 s of No. 1 ANS from RAF Stradishall and the Vickers Varsities of No. 2 ANS from RAF Gaydon, along with the Airmen Aircrew Initial Training School RAF. In 1996 the Dominie squadron was re-designated as No. 55 Squadron RAF until the retirement of the Dominie in 2011.

Low-level Weapons Systems Officer (at the time known in the RAF as 'Navigators') training took place on the Jet Provost from August 1970, eventually using the T.5B variant which had extra fuel capacity in the form of wingtip tanks due to the extra fuel burn at low level. This part of the school was known as the Low Level and Air Defence Training Squadron (LLADTS). Scottish Aviation Bulldogs were added from January 1976 with Short Tucanos joining later.

During the 1960s and 1970s each of the RAF's Colleges and Flying Training Schools had their own Jet Provost aerobatics team. One of the less known and publicised display teams was flown by 6 FTS. They flew a team for five seasons between 1962 and 1966 and it was unofficially christened the "Cocks O'the North".

On 14 August 1993, the LLADTS made its final farewell to the Jet Provost in the navigation training role when four aircraft staged a "dying swan" formation over the airfield.

6 FTS also played host to the Multi-engine Training Squadron (METS) and was responsible for Operational Navigation training of all RAF multi-engine pilots, using twin-turboprop Handley Page Jetstream T1 aircraft. METS was granted the No. 45 (R) Squadron number plate in June 1992 before leaving 6 FTS and moving to 3 FTS at RAF Cranwell in October 1995. During April 1995, the Tucano element moved to RAF Topcliffe.

The school was disbanded on 31 March 1996 with the closure of RAF Finningley.

Structure:

No. 6 FTS Basic Navigation Wing (Wing created October 1992):

- No. 1 Basic Navigation Training Squadron – Bulldog T.1 and Tucano T.1
- No. 2 Basic Navigation Training Squadron – Dominie T.1
- Ground School
- Officer Training Squadron

No. 6 FTS Advanced Navigation Wing (Wing created October 1992):

- No. 100 Squadron – Hawk T.1
- Air Navigation Training Squadron Dominie T.1
- Navigation School Standards Squadron
- Multi-Engine Training Squadron (No. 45 Squadron)

=== Reformation ===
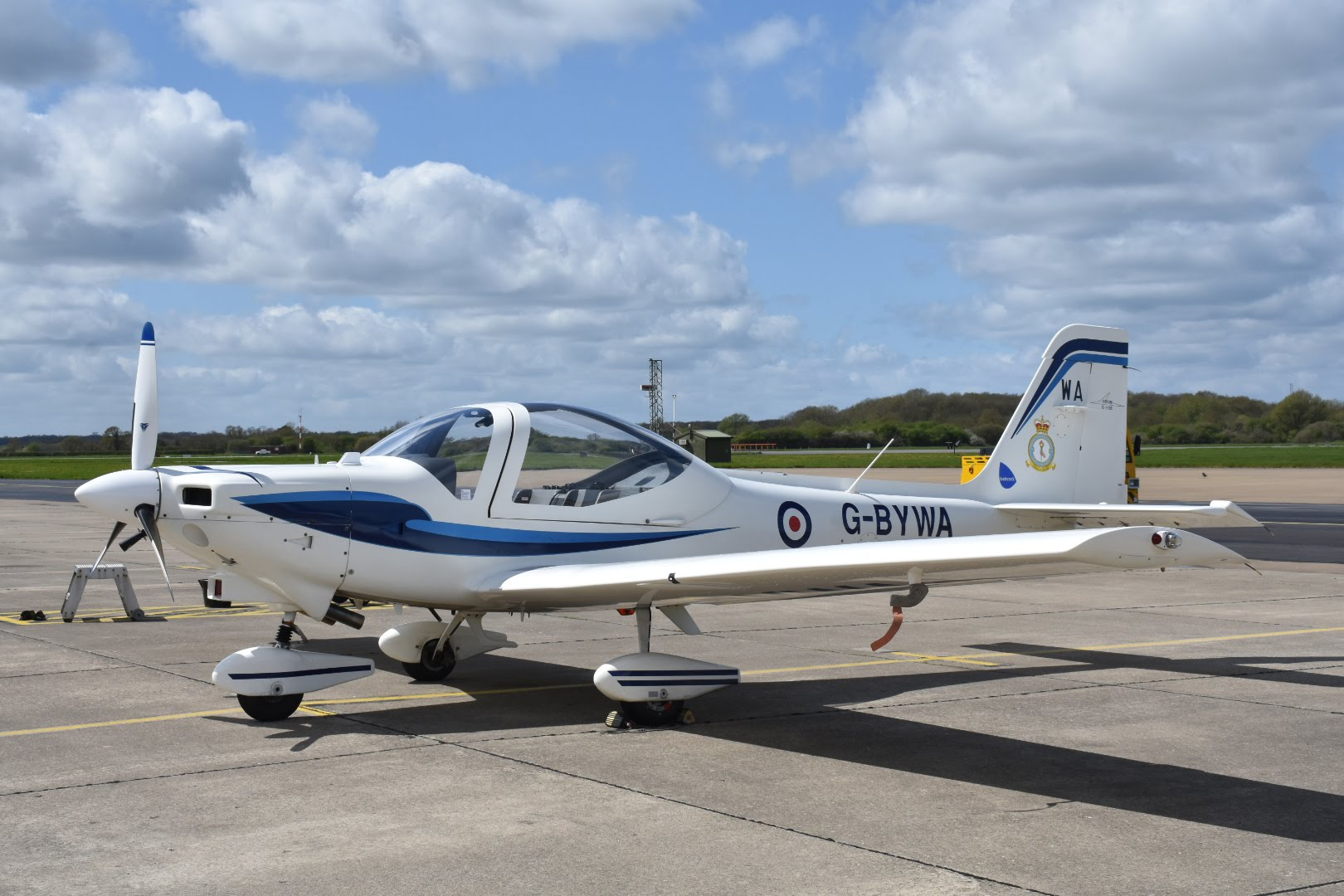
Operational Tutor T.1 of No. 6 Flying Training School in 2018

On 7 September 2015, 6 FTS was reborn to command and manage the University Air Squadrons and their associated Air Experience Flights across the UK. This role was transferred from 3 FTS due to the implementation of the Military Flying Training System. The Elementary Flying Training (EFT) units in the Royal Air Force and the other services upgraded to the Grob Prefect T.1 in 2017, while the University Air Squadrons and Air Experience Flights will remain on the Tutor T.1.

The task of 6 FTS is also to ensure continual recruitment of UAS cadets into the Royal Air Force proper; those who do not join will have a better appreciation for the military, which they will take forward into their careers.

== Current units ==
University Air Squadron (UAS) and
Air Experience Flight (AEF) bases in the United Kingdom

RAF Cosford

- University of Birmingham Air Squadron
- No. 8 Air Experience Flight RAF (8 AEF)

Colerne Airfield

- No. 3 Air Experience Flight RAF (3 AEF)

RAF Wittering

- No. 115 Squadron RAF
- Cambridge University Air Squadron
- University of London Air Squadron
- No. 5 Air Experience Flight RAF (5 AEF)

RAF Cranwell

- East Midlands Universities Air Squadron
- No. 7 Air Experience Flight RAF (7 AEF)

Leuchars Station

- East of Scotland Universities Air Squadron
- No. 12 Air Experience Flight RAF (12 AEF)

Glasgow Airport

- Universities of Glasgow and Strathclyde Air Squadron
- No. 4 Air Experience Flight RAF (4 AEF)

RAF Woodvale

- Liverpool University Air Squadron
- Manchester and Salford Universities Air Squadron
- No. 10 Air Experience Flight RAF (10 AEF)

RAF Leeming

- Northumbrian Universities Air Squadron
- Yorkshire Universities Air Squadron
- No. 11 Air Experience Flight RAF (11 AEF)
- No. 9 Air Experience Flight RAF (9 AEF)

RAF Benson

- Oxford University Air Squadron
- No. 6 Air Experience Flight RAF (6 AEF)

MoD Boscombe Down

- Bristol University Air Squadron
- Southampton University Air Squadron
- No. 2 Air Experience Flight RAF (2 AEF)

MOD St Athan

- Universities of Wales Air Squadron
- No. 1 Air Experience Flight RAF (1 AEF)

Aldergrove Flying Station

- Northern Ireland Universities Air Squadron
- No. 13 Air Experience Flight RAF (13 AEF)

With the reduction in the gliding fleet for Air Cadets of the Air Training Corps (ATC) and the RAF section of the Combined Cadet Force (CCF), the Ministry of Defence (MoD) announced in 2016 they intend to create two additional AEFs; No. 13 and No. 14, the latter is penned to be based in Northern Ireland.
