= 51st Infantry Brigade and Headquarters Scotland =

Headquarters 51st Infantry Brigade & Headquarters Scotland 51st (Scottish) Brigade 51st (Highland) Infantry Brigade 51st Brigade
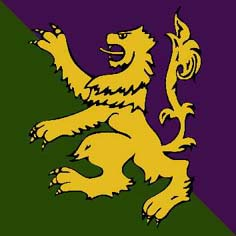
- Insignia of HQ 51st Infantry Brigade
- Active: 1914–1918; 1983–present
- Country: United Kingdom
- Branch: British Army
- Type: Infantry
- Size: Brigade
- Part of: Regional Command (British Army)
- Garrison/HQ: Redford Barracks, Edinburgh
- Nickname: The Fighting 51st
- Engagements: First World War

Commanders
- Current commander: Brigadier Jody Davies MBE

HQ 51st Infantry Brigade and Headquarters Scotland is a Regional Point of Command, Brigade of the British Army.

Although it takes its name and identity directly from, the 51st (Highland) Division, it is also a descendant of the 52nd Lowland Division.

== History ==
=== World War I ===
The 51st Brigade began as a formation of the 17th (Northern) Division during the First World War. It spent the entirety of the war with the Division on the Western Front.

=== Cold War ===
Following the complete reorganisation of the Territorial Army into the Territorial and Army Volunteer Reserve (TAVR) in 1967 following the 1966 Defence White Paper, the old regional brigades and divisions were disbanded. Among the formations which disappeared was the 51st (Highland) Division/District, which had overseen the Scottish Highlands.

The brigade level of command for the Territorial Army, was eliminated in the 1967 reforms, leaving little or no direction in doctrine or training from above. This was resolved in 1982 with the recreation of several territorial brigades, however these new formations were purely administrative headquarters for training. In 1982, the 51st (Highland) Infantry Brigade was formed with headquarters at Queen's Barracks, Perth taking control overall all the TA units within the Scottish Highlands.

If mobilised, 51st (Highland) Infantry Brigade would oversee Highland Zone, which encompassed the following TAORs: Orkney, Shetland, Western Isles, Highland (region), Grampians, Tayside, Fife, and Central Region. These TAORs were further divided into several Key Points (KPs), which would nominally be guarded by Home Defence battalions, but also the new Home Service Force. 51st (Highland) Brigade encompassing the Scottish Highlands: Argyll (part of Strathclyde), Central Scotland, Kingdom of Fife, Tayside, Grampian, Highland, Western Isles, Orkney, and Shetland. 51st Infantry Brigade's primary role was that of mobile defence of the UK, with a particular emphasis on defending the military infrastructure at the UK end of the Greenland-Iceland-UK (G-I-UK) Gap alongside 52 Brigade.

=== Twenty-First Century ===
On 1 April 2002, 51 (Scottish) Brigade took on the regional responsibility for the whole of Scotland, instead of just the Highlands, with its headquarters originally at Forthside Barracks in Stirling and its Regional Training Centre situated at Redford Barracks in Edinburgh. This enabled 52 (Lowland) Brigade, which previously administered all Lowland TA units, to be specifically reorganised to parent Regular light role infantry battalions for operational deployments. 51st (Scottish) Brigade also co-ordinated operational deployments within its regional area of responsibility, such as in scenarios requiring Military Aid to the Civil Community.

In April 2012, with the disbandment of 2nd Division, the brigade came under the control of the new Support Command based in Aldershot. On 31 March 2014, it was renamed 51st Infantry Brigade and Headquarters Scotland, and took on regional responsibilities as part of the Army 2020 reorganisation. It is now located at Redford Barracks, Edinburgh.

== Current structure ==
=== Units under Operational Command of HQ 51st Infantry Brigade and Headquarters Scotland ===
These include:

- Balaklava Company, 5th Battalion, The Royal Regiment of Scotland at Redford Barracks, Edinburgh
- Edinburgh Garrison
- Leuchars Station Support Unit
- Kinloss Support Unit

=== Other Regular units in Scotland ===
- Royal Scots Dragoon Guards, at Leuchars Station, Fife.
- 2nd Battalion, The Royal Regiment of Scotland at Glencorse.
- 3rd Battalion, The Royal Regiment of Scotland at Fort George, Inverness .
- 3rd Battalion, The Rifles at Dreghorn, Edinburgh.
- 39 Engineer Regiment, at Kinloss Barracks.
- 2nd Battalion Royal Electrical and Mechanical Engineers, at Leuchars Station, Fife.
- 27 Army Education Centre, Redford Barracks, Edinburgh.
- 110 Provost Company Royal Military Police, at Leuchars Station, Fife.
- Army Personnel Centre, Glasgow.
- Scottish and North Irish Personal Recovery Centre, Edinburgh.

=== Reserve Forces ===
- Scottish and North Irish Yeomanry, at Redford Barracks, Edinburgh
- 6th Battalion, The Royal Regiment of Scotland based in Glasgow
- 7th Battalion, The Royal Regiment of Scotland at Queen's Barracks, Perth
- A Company, 4th Battalion the Parachute Regiment
- 71 Engineer Regiment, Leuchars
- 105 Regiment Royal Artillery, Edinburgh
- 153 Company, 102 Close Support Battalion Royal Mechanical Engineer, Grangemouth
- 215 (Scottish) Multi-Role Medical Regiment
- 154 Regiment Royal Logistic Corps, Dunfermline
- 157 Company 102 Battalion Royal Electrical Mechanical Engineers
- Army Training Unit (Scotland), Edinburgh

University Officers' Training Corps

- Highland Officers Training Regiment, at Gordon Barracks, Aberdeen
- City of Edinburgh University Officers' Training Corps, in Edinburgh
- Glasgow and Strathclyde University Officers' Training Corps, in Glasgow

=== Affiliated Cadet Units ===
- Glasgow and Lanarkshire Battalion, Army Cadet Force, in Cambuslang
- Lothian and Borders Battalion, Army Cadet Force, in Broxburn
- West Lowland Battalion, Army Cadet Force, in Ayr
- Black Watch Battalion, Army Cadet Force, at Queen's Barracks, Perth
- Angus and Dundee Battalion, Army Cadet Force, in Carnoustie
- 1st Battalion, The Highlanders Army Cadet Force, in Dingwall
- 2nd Battalion, The Highlanders Army Cadet Force, in Boddam
- Argyll and Sutherland Highlanders Battalion, Army Cadet Force, in Dumbarton
- There are also 16 Combined Cadet Force (CCF) located in Independent Schools in Scotland.

== See also ==
- Armed forces in Scotland
- Military history of Scotland

== External links and sources ==
- 51st Infantry Brigade and HQ Scotland (Official Website)
