= Akeman Street (disambiguation) =

Akeman Street is a Roman road from Cirencester, Gloucestershire to St Albans, Hertfordshire, England.

Akeman Street may also refer to:

- Akeman Street railway station, a former railway station at Woodham, Buckinghamshire, England
- RAF Akeman Street, a former airfield near Minster Lovell, Oxfordshire, England
- Akeman Street (Cambridgeshire), a Roman road from Wimpole Hall, Cambridgeshire to Brancaster, Norfolk, England
- MS Akeman Street, original name of the former passenger ferry MS Norman Atlantic
