= Flying officer =

Junior commissioned rank in the Royal Air Force and the air forces of many countries

Flying officer (Fg Off or F/O) is a junior officer rank used by some air forces, with origins from the UK Royal Air Force. The rank is used by air forces of many countries that have historical British influence.

Flying officer is one rank above pilot officer and one below flight lieutenant.

It is equivalent to the rank of sub-lieutenant in the navy and lieutenant in other services.

The equivalent rank in the Women's Auxiliary Air Force was "Section Officer" before this organisation adopted common ranks with male officers.

== Canada ==
The rank was used in the Royal Canadian Air Force until the 1968 unification of the Canadian Forces, when army-type rank titles were adopted. Canadian flying officers then became lieutenants. In official Canadian French usage, the rank title was lieutenant d'aviation.

== United Kingdom ==
Flying officer
- Shoulder and sleeve insignia
- Country: United Kingdom
- Service branch: Royal Air Force
- Abbreviation: Fg Off / FLGOFF / FGOFF
- Rank group: Junior officers
- NATO rank code: OF-1
- Formation: August 1919
- Next higher rank: Flight lieutenant
- Next lower rank: Pilot officer
- Equivalent ranks: Lieutenant (British Army; RM); Sub-lieutenant (RN) (Note: Junior to both military and air force rank)

Related articles
- History: Royal Naval Air Service

=== Origins ===
The term "flying officer" was originally used in the Royal Flying Corps as a flying appointment for junior officers, not a rank.

On 1 April 1918, the newly created RAF adopted its officer rank titles from the British Army, with Royal Naval Air Service sub-lieutenants (entitled flight sub-lieutenants) and Royal Flying Corps lieutenants becoming lieutenants in the RAF. However, with the creation of the RAF's own rank structure in August 1919, RAF lieutenants were re-titled flying officers, a rank which has been in continuous use ever since.

=== Usage ===
The rank title does not imply that an officer in the rank of flying officer flies. Some flying officers are aircrew, but many are ground branch officers. Amongst the ground branches some flying officers have command of flights.

In the RAF, aircrew and engineer officers are commissioned directly into the rank of flying officer, while ground branches are commissioned as pilot officers for an initial period of six months. Time served in the rank of flying officer varies depending on branch before automatic promotion to flight lieutenant; aircrew and BEng qualified officers will serve for a period of 2½ years, MEng qualified engineers for 1½ years, and all other ground branches for 3½ years. A graduate entrant who has an MEng but is joining a ground branch other than engineer will serve 3½ years as a flying officer – the early promotion for MEng engineers is designed as a recruitment incentive. The starting salary for a flying officer is £39,671 per year.

In many cases the rank of flying officer is the first rank an air force officer holds after successful completion of his professional training. A flying officer might serve as a pilot in training, an adjutant, a security officer or an administrative officer and is typically given charge of personnel and/or resources. By the time aviators have completed their training, they will have served their 2½ years and typically join their frontline squadrons as flight lieutenants.

=== Insignia ===
The rank insignia consists of one narrow blue band on slightly wider black band. This is worn on both the lower sleeves of the tunic or on the shoulders of the flying suit or the casual uniform. The rank insignia on the mess uniform is similar to the naval pattern, being one band of gold running around each cuff but without the Royal Navy's loop.

An RAF flying officer's shoulder insignia

An RAF flying officer's sleeve mess insignia

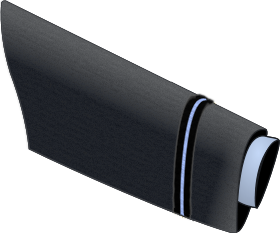
An RAF flying officer's sleeve on No.1 dress uniform

== Gallery ==
(Royal Australian Air Force)

(Bangladesh Air Force)

(Ghana Air Force)

(Indian Air Force)

(Namibian Air Force)

(Nigerian Air Force)

(Pakistan Air Force)

(Sri Lanka Air Force)

(Royal Air Force)

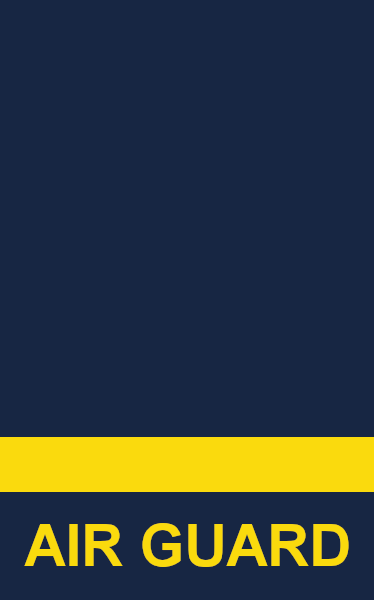
(Trinidad and Tobago Air Guard)

== See also ==
- Air force officer rank insignia
- British and U.S. military ranks compared
- Comparative military ranks
- RAF officer ranks
- Ranks of the RAAF
- Flight officer
