= No. 12 Air Experience Flight RAF =

12 Air Experience Flight
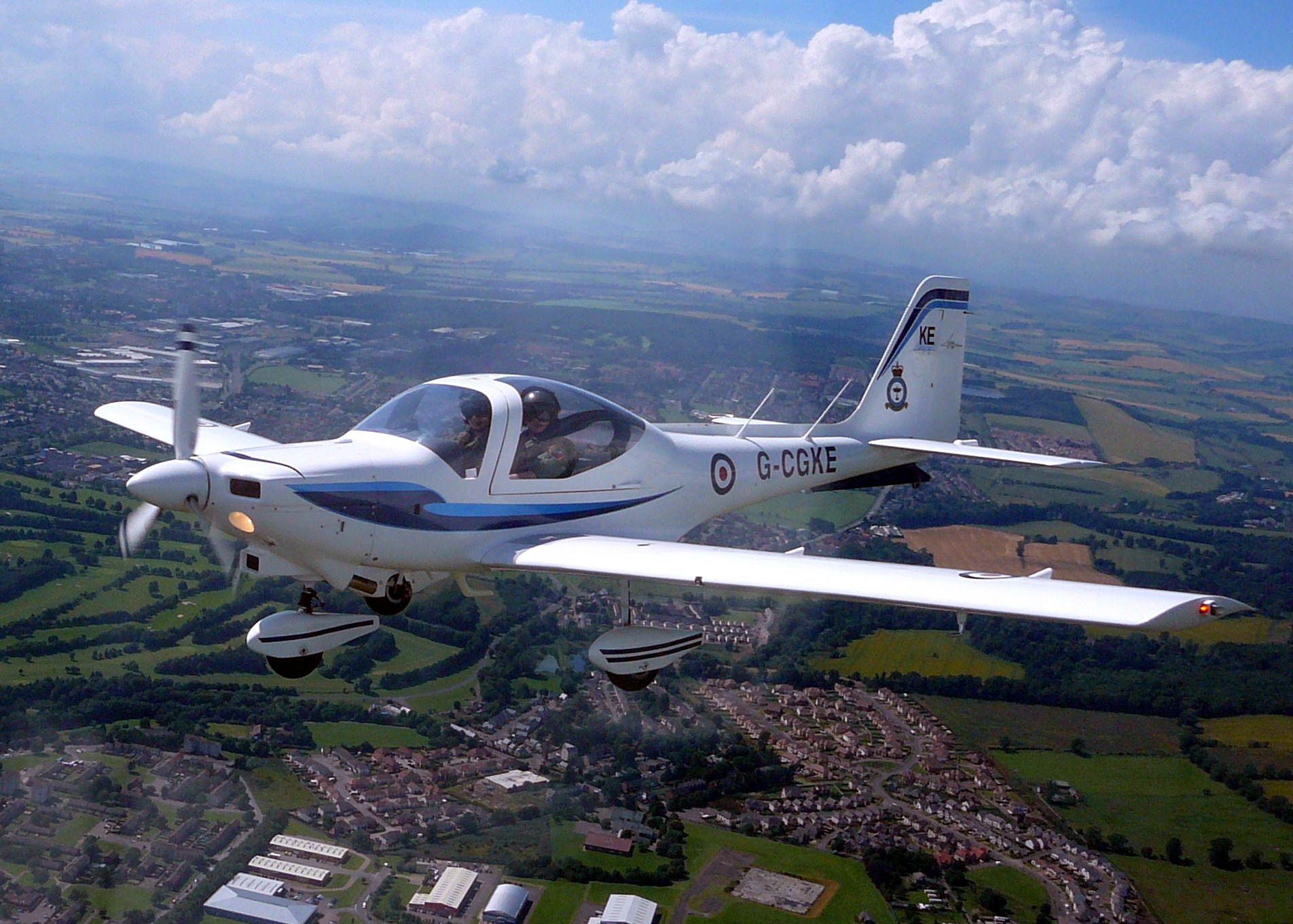
- Grob Tutor aircraft similar to that flown by 12 AEF
- Active: 8 September 1958 - Present
- Country: United Kingdom
- Allegiance: Royal Air Force
- Branch: Royal Air Force Volunteer Reserve
- Type: Flying Training
- Role: Air Experience Flying
- Part of: East of Scotland Universities Air Squadron and No. 6 Flying Training School RAF
- Garrison/HQ: Leuchars Station

Commanders
- OC 12 AEF: Flt Lt I A Torrance

Aircraft flown
- Trainer: Grob Tutor

12 Air Experience Flight (12 AEF) is a sub unit of East of Scotland Universities Air Squadron based at Leuchars Station.

== Operational role ==
The Royal Air Force (RAF) Air Experience Flights (AEF) are integrated with University Air Squadron (UAS) units to pool resources and share aircraft. Air Experience Flights provide basic flying experience, and aerobatics to eligible members of Royal Air Force Air Cadets (RAFAC), otherwise known as the Air Training Corps (ATC), along with the RAF section of the Combined Cadet Force (CCF-RAF), and other air-minded youth groups such as Air Scouts and the Girls Venture Corps Air Cadets (GVC-AC).

12 AEF primarily flies cadets from North Scotland, Central Scotland and South East Scotland Wings of the RAF Air Cadets (RAFAC), as well as Combined Cadet Force (RAF) cadets from independent schools in Aberdeen, Edinburgh, Dollar and Perthshire.

12 AEF also provides flying opportunities for UAS Officer Cadets who are part of the Air Experience Stream (AES) as well as delivering the Air Cadet Pilot Scheme (ACPS) and Air Cadet Pilot Navigation Scheme (ACPNS) on behalf of 6 FTS.

== History ==
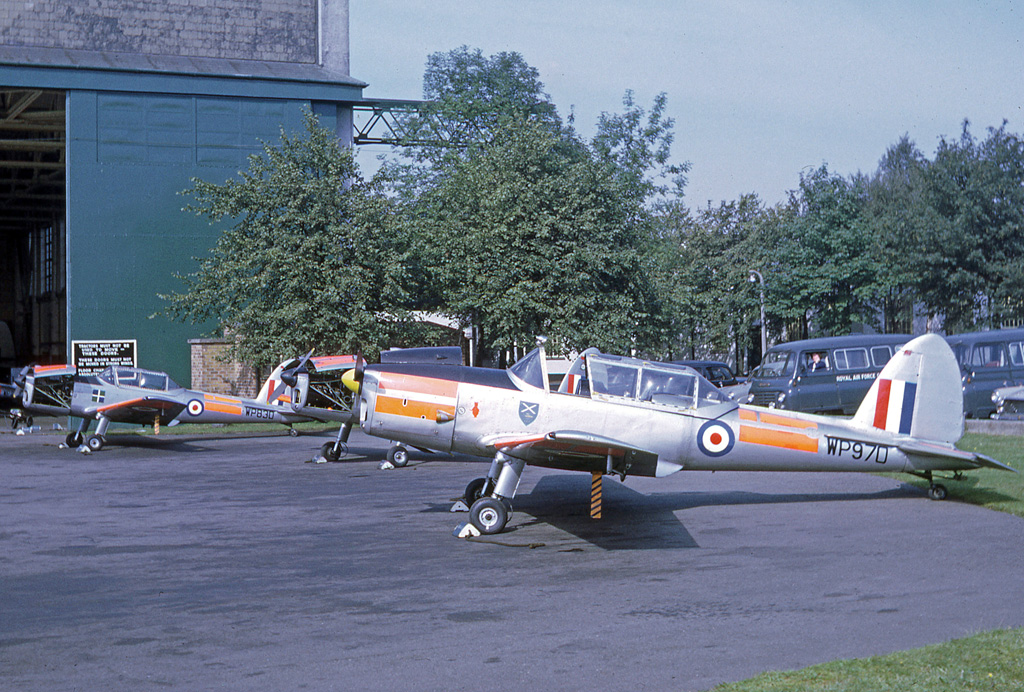
DH Chipmunk T.10 of 12 AEF wearing the units marking on its forward fuselage at its RAF Turnhouse base in 1967

12 AEF was formed on 8 September 1958 at RAF Turnhouse, Edinburgh, equipped with Chipmunk T10 aircraft. On 1 April 1996, the unit moved its operational base to RAF Leuchars, where it became parented by East Lowlands Universities Air Squadron (ELUAS) and retired its Chipmunks in favour of sharing ELUAS's Bulldog T.1 aircraft.

When East Lowlands UAS (ELUAS) and Aberdeen, Dundee and St Andrews UAS (ADStAUAS) merged in 2003, 12 AEF became an integral flight of the newly formed East of Scotland Universities Air Squadron, flying the Grob Tutor T1.
