= RAF Windrush =

Former Royal Air Force station in Gloucestershire, England

RAF Windrush
- Near Windrush, Gloucestershire in England
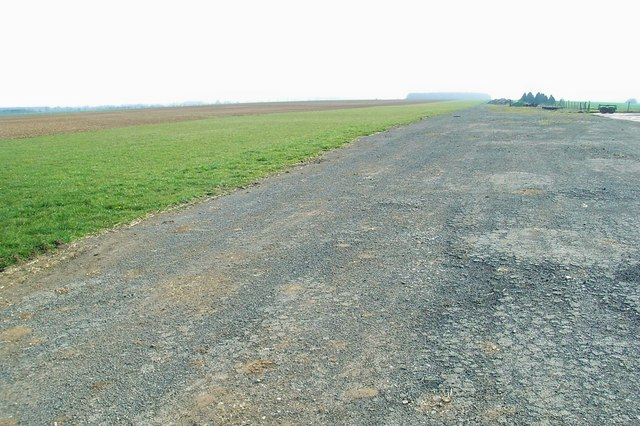
- Landing Strip, Windrush Airfield

Site information
- Type: Royal Air Force satellite station
- Owner: Air Ministry
- Operator: Royal Air Force
- Controlled by: RAF Flying Training Command

Location
- Shown within Gloucestershire RAF Windrush (the United Kingdom)
- Coordinates: 51°48′16″N 001°44′09″W

Site history
- Built: 1940/42
- In use: 1940 - 1945
- Battles/wars: European theatre of World War II

Airfield information
Runways
Direction	Length and surface
00/00	Sommerfeld Tracking
00/00	Sommerfeld Tracking

Royal Air Force Windrush, or more simply RAF Windrush, is a former Royal Air Force satellite station near Windrush, Gloucestershire, England. It was opened in 1940 and closed on 12 July 1945. Initially it was a Relief Landing Ground for RAF Chipping Norton, later coming under the control of RAF Little Rissington.

== History ==
The airfield consisted of two Sommerfeld tracking runways, a concrete perimeter track, 1 T1 building and 8 Blister Hangars amongst many others. Most of this infrastructure was added in 1942. Some of the original buildings remain in situ though the site has been returned to agricultural use. The Watch Tower was restored in the 1990s. The airfield is partly in the ownership of the National Trust.

The following units were here at some point:

- No. 6 (Pilots) Advanced Flying Unit RAF
- No. 6 Service Flying Training School RAF
- No. 15 Service Flying Training School RAF

== Memorial ==
A memorial at the church in Windrush village describes Sgt Pilot Bruce Hancock RAFVR who died on 18 August 1940 when downing a German Heinkel bomber by ramming it with his unarmed training Avro Anson aircraft.

== Postwar ==
Following closure in 1945 the airfield history has not been fully recorded but the then landowner Lord Sherborne purchased the airfield in 1969 back from the MOD and over time either demolished many of the hundred or so RAF buildings, or else established conifer plantations around them seeking to hide them from view. Many bomb shelters, ancillary buildings and concrete access tracks remain in these plantations. The Midland Parachuting Club was granted a lease of a strip of grass for use as a runway from 1992 until 1997 and used the Watch Tower as their base for Parachuting during that period.

== Current ownership ==
The western portion of the airfield came under the ownership of the National Trust in March 1987 as part of the bequest of the Lodge Park and Sherborne Estate by the 7th Baron Sherborne. It is currently part of a let agricultural holding on the estate. Apart from two public bridleways there is currently no public access to the site.

The National Trust Estate Office is in the nearby village of Sherborne, Gloucestershire.

== See also ==
- List of former Royal Air Force stations
