= RAF Chipping Norton =

Former Royal Air Force station in Oxfordshire, England

RAF Chipping Norton
- Near Chipping Norton, Oxfordshire in England

Site information
- Type: Royal Air Force Satellite station
- Owner: Air Ministry
- Operator: Royal Air Force

Location
- Shown within Oxfordshire
- Coordinates: 51°55′28″N 001°31′35″W

Site history
- Built: 1940
- In use: 1941-1945

Airfield information
- Elevation: 207 metres (679 ft) AMSL
Runways
Direction	Length and surface
10/28	1,000 metres (3,281 ft) Sommerfeld Tracking
05/23	900 metres (2,953 ft) Sommerfeld Tracking

Royal Air Force Chipping Norton or more simply RAF Chipping Norton is a former Royal Air Force satellite station located near Chipping Norton, Oxfordshire, England. It was operational from 10 July 1940 to 1945 and returned to agricultural use when disposed of in 1953.

== History ==
The following units were posted to this airfield at some point:

- No. 3 Maintenance Unit RAF.
- No. 6 (Pilots) Advanced Flying Unit RAF renamed No. 6 Service Flying Training School RAF.
- No. 11 Service Flying Training School RAF.
- No. 15 Service Flying Training School RAF.
- No. 1517 (Beam Approach Training) Flight RAF.

Airspeed Oxfords and North American Harvard I's flew from this airfield.

The station was bombed on two occasions in October and November 1940. Little damage was done and on the second attempt the Luftwaffe missed the airfield by about a mile to the East.

== Current use ==
The site is currently farmland, partly owned by Jeremy Clarkson and used for his show, Clarkson's Farm. Part of the site is used for airsoft.

== See also ==
- List of former Royal Air Force stations
