= Lothian and Borders Battalion, Army Cadet Force =

Cadet force county of the United Kingdom

- Active: April 1992–present
- Country: United Kingdom
- Type: Registered Volunteer Youth Organisation
- Role: To inspire and develop 12-18 year olds
- Size: Battalion
- Part of: Army Cadet Force; Headquarters Scotland
- County HQ: Broxburn
- Website: Lothian and Borders Battalion, Army Cadet Force

Insignia
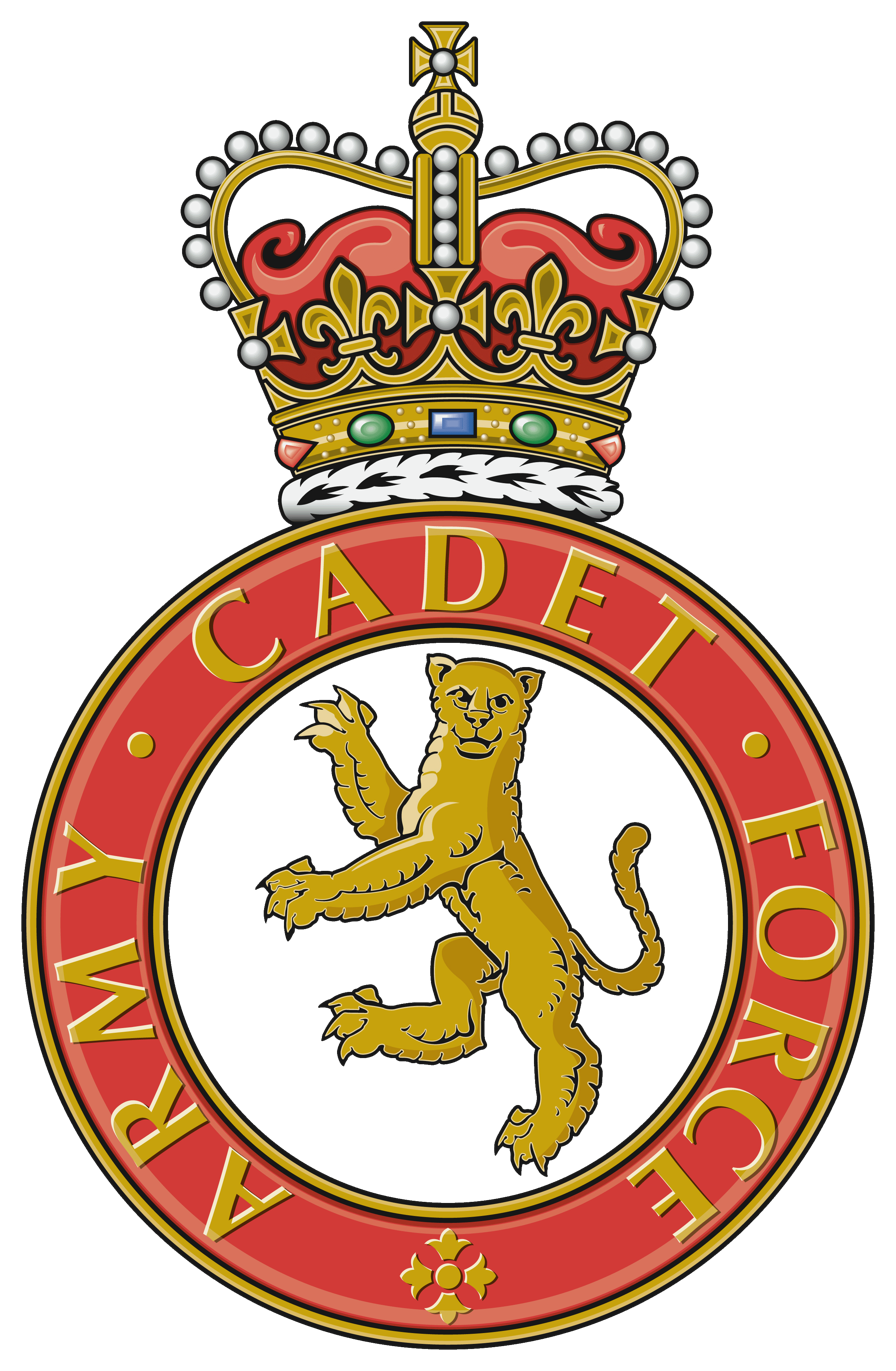
- Army Cadet Force Badge

The Lothian and Borders Battalion, Army Cadet Force (Lothian & Borders Bn, ACF) is a cadet battalion forming part of the Army Cadet Force operating within the Scottish Lowlands. Since 2014, the county has been part of Headquarters Scotland and is currently divided into five companies and includes a regimental band and pipes and drums.

== Background ==
In 1863, along with the formation of the Volunteer Force, the first government sanctioned cadet groups were allowed to be formed. These groups would mostly be formed in connection with existing volunteer companies and battalions. Following the Territorial and Reserve Forces Act 1907 which organised the former Volunteer Force into a coherent organisation, known as the Territorial Force (TF), the cadets were expanded. Each company consisted of no less than 30 cadets, and four of these companies formed a "Cadet Battalion", the predecessors to the modern "Cadet County".

Unlike their modern successors, the first cadet battalions were administered by their local County Territorial Force Associations, and rarely ever came under an "army command". However, following changes to the organisation of the Cadets, in 1923 all cadet forces were taken under complete control of the County Associations.

Following the Options for Change announced following the Dissolution of the Soviet Union and subsequent End of the Cold War, the Lothian Battalion and King's Own Scottish Borders Battalions of the Army Cadet Force were merged into the new Lothian and Borders Battalion, Army Cadet Force. The first mention of the battalion was for a Second Lieutenant on probation appointed to be Lieutenant in the battalion from 23 November 1996. This battalion however had been formed in 1992.

In 2013, the battalion was reorganised from six companies (lettered A-F) into four companies named after battle honours of the Royal Scots Borderers. Following this reorganisation, the battalion's structure was revamped and the below structure is that of 2021 after the reforms.

As of December 2021, each Army Cadet Force county reports to their local brigade deputy commander, or in the case of independent regional headquarters the commander. However, for administrative duties each cadet county reports to Commander Cadets, who is a senior 1* Brigadier part of Headquarters, Regional Command.

== Organisation ==
As of January 2022, the Lothian and Borders Battalion ACF consists of appx. 700 cadets and 150 adult volunteers in 34 detachments spread throughout the Lothians and Border areas. Each Army Cadet Force 'county' is in-fact a battalion, and each 'detachment' is equivalent to that of a platoon.

Detachment	Affiliation	Location	County	Postal Code
Alma Company
Company Headquarters	Encompassing Midlothian and the City of Edinburgh (minus the North detachments)	Eastfield Farm Road, Penicuik	Midlothian	EH26 8EZ
No. 10 Bonnyrigg Platoon	Royal Scots Borderers, Royal Regiment of Scotland	Eldindean Road, Bonnyrigg	Midlothian	EH19 2HQ
No. 11 Penicuick Platoon	Royal Scots Borderers, Royal Regiment of Scotland	Eastfield Farm Road, Penicuick	Midlothian	EH26 8EZ
No. 12 Dalkeith Platoon	Royal Scots Borderers, Royal Regiment of Scotland	East Houses Industrial Estate, Dalkeith	Midlothian	EH22 4DJ
No. 19 Gilmerton Troop	Royal Scots Dragoon Guards	Ferniehill Drive, Gilmerton, Edinburgh	Midlothian	EH17 7AR
Lothian and Borders Battalion ACF Pipes and Drums (No. 20 Troop)	E (Lothian and Borders Horse) Squadron, Scottish and North Irish Yeomanry	301 Colinton Road, Edinburgh	Midlothian	EH13 0LA
Lothian and Borders Battalion ACF Band (No. 21 Troop)	Royal Scots Dragoon Guards	Army Cadet Force Hut, Chesser Crescent, Edinburgh	Midlothian	EH14 1RA
No. 22 Lanark Road Troop	Royal Corps of Signals	Lanark Road, Edinburgh	Midlothian	EH14 2NA
No. 35 Alnwickhill Troop	E (Lothian and Borders Horse) Squadron, Scottish and North Irish Yeomanry	Alnwickhill Road, Alnwickhill, Edinburgh	Midlothian	EH16 6NQ
No. 36 Loanhead Platoon	Royal Scots Borderers, Royal Regiment of Scotland	King George V Park, Loanhead	Midlothian	EH20 9LA
Kohima Company
Company Headquarters	Encompassing Northern Edinburgh and East Lothian	Goosegreen, Musselburgh	East Lothian	EH21 7SN
No. 14 Musselburgh Troop	E (Lothian and Borders Horse) Squadron, Scottish and North Irish Yeomanry	Goosegreen, Musselburgh	East Lothian	EH21 7SN
No. 16 Dunbar Troop	E (Lothian and Borders Horse) Squadron, Scottish and North Irish Yeomanry	Castle Park Barracks, Bayswell Road, Dunbar	East Lothian	EH42 1EU
No. 17 Granton Square Platoon	Royal Scots Borderers, Royal Regiment of Scotland	Granton Square, Edinburgh	Midlothian	EH5 1HE
No. 18 Claremont Street Platoon	Royal Scots Borderers, Royal Regiment of Scotland	East Claremont Street, Edinburgh	Midlothian	EH7 4HU
No. 23 MacDonald Road Detachment	Royal Scots Borderers, Royal Regiment of Scotland	124 MacDonald Road, Edinburgh	Midlothian	EH7 4NQ
No. 24 South Queensferry Platoon	Royal Scots Borderers, Royal Regiment of Scotland	Roseberry Avenue, South Queensferry, Edinburgh	West Lothian	EH30 9NX
No. 31 Tranent Platoon	Royal Scots Borderers, Royal Regiment of Scotland	Old School House, Sandersons Wynd, Tranent	East Lothian	EH33 1DA
No. 32 Prestonpans Platoon	Royal Scots Borderers, Royal Regiment of Scotland	Rope Walk, Prestonpans	East Lothian	EH32 9BN
No. 33 Haddington Troop	E (Lothian and Borders Horse) Squadron, Scottish and North Irish Yeomanry	Pencaitland Road, Haddington	East Lothian	EH41 4EW
No. 34 North Berwick Platoon	Royal Scots Borderers, Royal Regiment of Scotland	Dunbar Road, North Berwick	East Lothian	EH39 4DG
Minden Company
Company Headquarters	Encompassing the Eastern Scottish Borders (Berwickshire, Peeblesshire, Roxburghshire, and Selkirkshire)	Paton Street, Galashiels	Roxburghshire	TD1 3AT
No. 1 Eyemouth Platoon	Royal Scots Borderers, Royal Regiment of Scotland	Acredale Industrial Estate, Eyemouth	Berwickshire	TD14 5AN
No. 2 Duns Platoon	Royal Scots Borderers, Royal Regiment of Scotland	Volunteer Hall, Duns	Berwickshire	TD11 3AF
No. 4 Kelso Platoon	Royal Scots Borderers, Royal Regiment of Scotland	Eschiehaugh, Kelso	Roxburghshire	TD5 7BS
No. 5 Jedburgh Platoon	Royal Scots Borderers, Royal Regiment of Scotland	Jedburgh	Roxburghshire	
No. 6 Hawick Platoon	Royal Scots Borderers, Royal Regiment of Scotland	Union Street, Hawick	Roxburghshire	TD9 9LF
No. 8 Galashiels Platoon	Royal Scots Borderers, Royal Regiment of Scotland	Paton Street, Galashiels	Roxburghshire	TD1 3AT
No. 9 Selkirk Platoon	Royal Scots Borderers, Royal Regiment of Scotland	Dovecot Park, Selkirk	Selkirkshire	TD7 4ER
No. 15 Peebles Platoon	Royal Scots Borderers, Royal Regiment of Scotland	Walkers Haugh, Peebles	Peeblesshire	EH45 8AU
Somme Company
Company Headquarters	West Lothian	Beveridge Square, Dedridge, Livingston	West Lothian	EH54 6QF
No. 25 Linlithgow Troop	E (Lothian and Borders Horse) Squadron, Scottish and North Irish Yeomanry	52 Barrowshill Avenue, Linlithgow	Linlithgowshire (West Lothian)	EH49 7SQ
No. 26 Livingston Platoon	243 Provost, Royal Military Police	Beveridge Square, Dedridge, Livingston	West Lothian	EH54 6QF
No. 27 Bathgate Platoon	Royal Scots Borderers, Royal Regiment of Scotland	Torphichen Street, Bathgate	West Lothian	EH48 4HH
No. 28 Broxburn Platoon	Royal Scots Borderers, Royal Regiment of Scotland	Pyot Hall Road, Port Buchan, Broxburn	West Lothian	EH52 6HN
No. 29 Whitburn Platoon	Royal Scots Borderers, Royal Regiment of Scotland	264 West Main Street, Whitburn	West Lothian	EH47 0JB
Broxburn Academy Detachment	Royal Scots Borderers, Royal Regiment of Scotland	Broxburn Academy, Cardross Road, Broxburn	West Lothian	EH52 6AG
Broxburn Academy Detachment	Royal Scots Borderers, Royal Regiment of Scotland	Broxburn Academy, Cardross Road, Broxburn	West Lothian	EH52 6AG

== Lord-Lieutenant's Cadets ==
Lord-Lieutenant's Cadet
- Incumbent; Cdt LCpl Jake Burnside since 2022
- Abbreviation: LLCofMACF
- Appointer: Lord-Lieutenant of Midlothian
- Term length: One Year
- Succession: Cdt Sgt Zoe Watson

The Lord-Lieutenant's Cadet is seen as the aide and representative of the cadet forces to the British royal family and the Lord-lieutenant in an administrative county Scotland. Typically, one is chosen from each of the main cadet forces, the Army Cadet Force, Air Training Corps and Sea Cadets (United Kingdom). Occasionally, one may also be chosen from the Combined Cadet Force. They are selected each year at the Spring Lord-lieutenant's awards in each county.

They provide an essential link between the armed forces and the local community, assist with recruiting within the cadet forces and assist the county's Reserve Forces and Cadets Association. The cadet from each arm of the cadet forces is selected and appointed based on their outreach and participation within their squadron, detachment or unit, and is seen as one of the highest achievements in the Cadet Forces.

== See also ==
- List of Army Cadet Force units
- Combined Cadet Force
