= Squadron leader =

OF-3 rank in the Royal Air Force and other air forces

Squadron leader (Sqn Ldr or S/L) is a senior officer rank used by some air forces, with origins from the Royal Air Force. The rank is used by air forces of many countries that have historical British influence.

Squadron leader is immediately senior to flight lieutenant and immediately below wing commander. It is usually equivalent to the rank of lieutenant commander in the navy and of the rank of major in other services.

The equivalent rank in the Women's Auxiliary Air Force, Women's Royal Air Force (until 1968) and Princess Mary's Royal Air Force Nursing Service (until 1980) was "squadron officer".

Squadron leader has also been used as a cavalry command appointment (UK) and rank (France) since at least the nineteenth century. In Argentina it is used as a command appointment by both the army's cavalry and by the air force's flying units. The cavalry rank of squadron leader in France is equivalent to a major, and the cavalry appointment of squadron leader in the UK generally corresponds to this rank as well.

== Canada ==
The rank was used in the Royal Canadian Air Force from 1920 until the 1968 unification of the Canadian Forces, when army-type rank titles were adopted. Canadian squadron leaders then became majors. In official Canadian French usage, the rank title was commandant d'aviation. However, in 2015, the insignia for Canadian air force majors reverted to two and half strips of braid in pearl grey on black.

== United Kingdom ==
Squadron leader
- Shoulder and sleeve insignia

- Masthead distinguishing flag
- Country: United Kingdom
- Service branch: Royal Air Force
- Abbreviation: Sqn Ldr / SQNLDR
- Rank group: Senior officers
- NATO rank code: OF-3
- Formation: August 1919
- Next higher rank: Wing commander
- Next lower rank: Flight lieutenant
- Equivalent ranks: Lieutenant commander (RN); Major (British Army; RM)

Related articles
- History: Royal Naval Air Service

=== Origins ===
The rank originated in the British Royal Air Force and was adopted by several other air forces which use, or used, the RAF rank system.

On 1 April 1918, the newly created RAF adopted its officer rank titles from the British Army, with Royal Naval Air Service lieutenant commanders and Royal Flying Corps majors becoming majors in the RAF. In response to the proposal that the RAF should use its own rank titles, it was suggested that the RAF might use the Royal Navy's officer ranks, with the word "air" inserted before the naval rank title. For example, the rank that later became squadron leader would have been air lieutenant commander. However, the Admiralty objected to this modification of their rank titles. The rank title squadron leader was chosen as squadrons were typically led by RAF majors and the term squadron commander had been used in the Royal Naval Air Service. The rank of squadron leader was introduced in August 1919 and has been used continuously since then.

=== RAF usage ===
From 1 April 1918 to 31 July 1919, the RAF used major as the equivalent rank to squadron leader. Royal Naval Air Service lieutenant-commanders and Royal Flying Corps majors on 31 March 1918 became RAF majors on 1 April 1918. On 31 August 1919, the RAF rank of major was superseded by squadron leader which has remained in continuous usage ever since. Promotion to squadron leader is strictly on merit, and requires the individual to be appointed to a Career Commission, which will see them remain in the RAF until retirement or voluntary resignation.

Before the Second World War, a squadron leader commanded a squadron of aircraft. Today, however, a flying squadron is usually commanded by a wing commander, with each of the two flights under a squadron leader. However, ground-operating squadrons which are sub-divisions of a wing are ordinarily commanded by a squadron leader. This includes squadrons of the RAF Regiment and University Air Squadrons.

=== Insignia and command flag ===
The rank insignia consists of a thin blue band on a slightly wider black band between two narrow blue bands on slightly wider black bands. This is worn on both the lower sleeves of the tunic or on the shoulders of the flying suit or the casual uniform.

Squadron leaders are the lowest ranking officers that may fly a command flag. The flag may be depicted on the officer's aircraft or, should the squadron leader be in command, the flag may be flown from a flagpole or displayed on an official car as a car flag. If the squadron leader is in command of a numbered squadron, then the number of the squadron is also shown on the flag.

An RAF squadron leader's sleeve/shoulder insignia

An RAF squadron leader's sleeve mess insignia

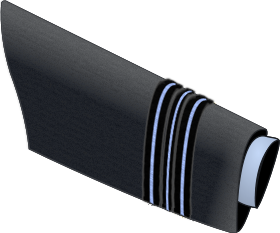
An RAF squadron leader's sleeve on No.1 service dress uniform

=== Land forces ===
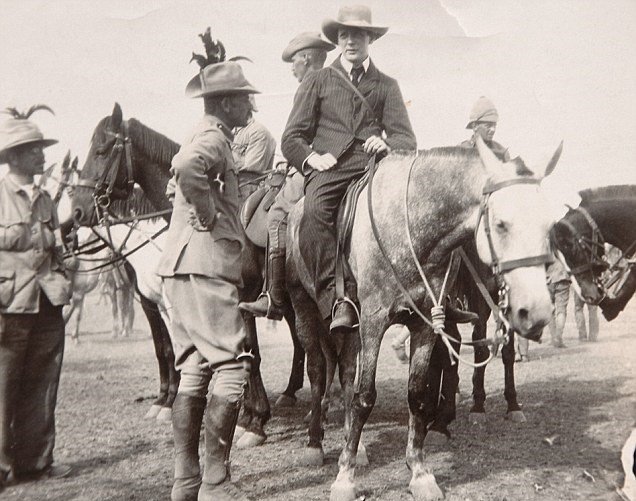
Winston Churchill served as a subaltern Squadron Leader in the South African Light Horse.

In the British Household Cavalry and Royal Armoured Corps, "squadron leader" is the title (but not the rank) often given to the commander of a squadron of armoured fighting vehicles. The squadron leader is usually a major (thus the equivalent rank to an RAF squadron leader), although in the Second World War the post was often held by a captain.

Before the modern cavalry and the invention of tanks and helicopters, the squadron leader led cavalry squadrons. This position was held by the South African Light Horse, and other similar cavalry units throughout the British Empire.

Squadron Leader is specifically the name for this position in the modern English language, but equivalent positions can be found in the Phylarch of Ancient Greece or the Decurion of Ancient Rome.

== Gallery ==
(Royal Australian Air Force)

(Bangladesh Air Force)

(Ghana Air Force)

(Indian Air Force)

(Namibian Air Force)

(Nigerian Air Force)

(Pakistan Air Force)

(Sri Lanka Air Force)

(Royal Air Force)

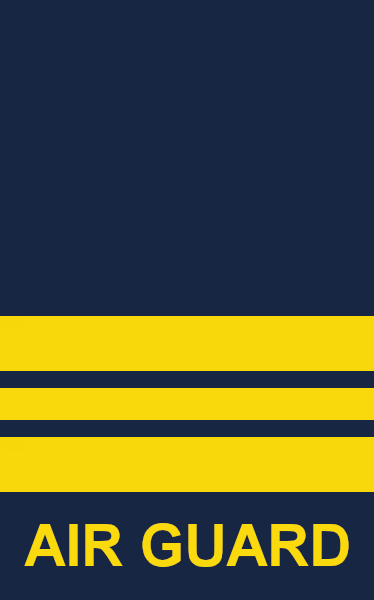
(Trinidad and Tobago Air Guard)

(Air Force of Zimbabwe)

== See also ==
- Air force officer rank insignia
- British and U.S. military ranks compared
- Comparative military ranks
- RAF officer ranks
- Ranks of the RAAF
