= RAF Akeman Street =

Former RAF Relief Landing Ground in Oxfordshire, England

RAF Akeman Street
- Minster Lovell, Oxfordshire in England

Site information
- Owner: Air Ministry
- Operator: Royal Air Force

Location
- Shown with Oxfordshire
- Coordinates: 51°49′22″N 1°31′01″W

Site history
- Built: 1939
- In use: 1940-1947

Airfield information
- Elevation: 134 metres (440 ft) AMSL
Runways
Direction	Length and surface
00/00	Grass field

Royal Air Force Akeman Street or more simply RAF Akeman Street is a former Royal Air Force Relief Landing Ground located 2 miles (3.2 km) north east of Minster Lovell, Oxfordshire, England. It was named after the Roman road which crosses the airfield.

The airfield was a Relief Landing Ground (RLG) for RAF Brize Norton, with building starting in 1939 and opening on 10 July 1940. Active flying stopped on 15 August 1945, and the site was closed on 1 February 1947.

== Based units ==
Units that used the airfield were No. 2 Service Flying Training School RAF (2 SFTS) from Brize Norton with Airspeed Oxford aircraft and then No. 6 (Pilots) Advanced Flying Unit RAF based at RAF Little Rissington (later became 6 SFTS) between 1942 and 1945.

Other units posted to the site included a sub site of No. 3 Maintenance Unit RAF between 9 April 1938 and January 1947 and a sub site of No. 21 Heavy Glider Conversion Unit RAF.

A German bombing raid on Brize Norton on 16 August 1940 forced the Advanced Training Squadron to move to Akeman Street.

The station closed on 1 February 1947.

== Current use ==
Little of the 10 Blister hangars and single large Bellman hangar remain today.

== See also ==
- List of former Royal Air Force stations
