= Ranks and insignia of the officers of the RAF =

The officer ranks of the Royal Air Force, as they are today, were introduced in 1919. Prior to that Army ranks were used.

== Insignia ==
=== Uniform insignia ===
Rank insignia of the commissioned officers of the Royal Air Force
Rank group	Officers of air rank					Senior officers			Junior officers			Officer cadets
NATO code	OF-10	OF-9	OF-8	OF-7	OF-6	OF-5	OF-4	OF-3	OF-2	OF-1		N/A
Insignia												
Rank	Marshal of the Royal Air Force	Air chief marshal	Air marshal	Air vice-marshal	Air commodore	Group captain	Wing commander	Squadron leader	Flight lieutenant	Flying officer	Pilot officer	Officer cadet
Abbreviation	MRAF	Air Chf Mshl	Air Mshl	AVM	Air Cdre	Gp Capt	Wg Cdr	Sqn Ldr	Flt Lt	Fg Off	Plt Off	Off Cdt

=== Masthead distinguishing flags ===
Diagram of an RAF flagstaff, showing the distinguishing flag of a group captain at the masthead and the RAF Ensign at the gaff/peak.

Officers of the rank of squadron leader and above in command of a unit may fly a 3 ft × 2 ft (0.91 m × 0.61 m) distinguishing flag at the masthead of the flagstaff at the unit headquarters.

RAF masthead distinguishing flags
Marshal of the Royal Air Force	Air chief marshal	Air marshal	Air vice-marshal
Air commodore	Group captain	Wing commander	Squadron leader

=== Motor car insignia ===
==== Star plates ====
Motor cars carrying officers of air rank (and their equivalents in the Royal Navy, Royal Marines and British Army) on official duties may bear a star plate, with the number of stars reflecting the rank of the officer. The plates must be covered when the officer is not in the vehicle. The colour of the star plate is air force blue for officers of the RAF, although RAF officers in joint service appointments use a star plate in the joint service colours, which consists of three vertical bands of royal blue, red and air force blue.

RAF star plates
Marshal of the Royal Air Force	Air chief marshal	Air marshal	Air vice-marshal	Air commodore

==== Car flags ====
RAF officers in certain appointments may fly a 12 in × 6 in (300 mm × 150 mm) flag appropriate to their position from the front of the bonnet of their car when on official duties and it is necessary for the car or its occupant to be recognised. The flag is not normally used on long journeys but may be hoisted when close to the destination. In foreign and Commonwealth countries, officers must seek the permission of its British ambassador or high commissioner in order to use the car flag.

RAF car flags
Chief of the air staff (Note: In felt for the chief of the air staff and in bunting for the following officers abroad only: air attachés/advisers, heads of RAF missions and delegations, commanders-in-chief, air officers commanding-in-chief and air commanders)	RAF members of the Air Force Board	AOC-in-Cs commands at home	AOCs groups and air headquarters (Note: Air officers commanding groups and air headquarters; Air Officer Scotland and Northern Ireland; AOC and Commandant, RAF College; Commandant-General, RAF Regiment (only when visiting RM, Army and RAF units in their official capacity); AO Wales (only when making official visits to service units or attending municipal functions in Wales); Air officers of Command Headquarters (only when making official inspections); Commandant Central Flying School (only when making official visits to service units))	Station commanders (Note: Within the bounds of their station or when attending municipal functions as the RAF representative.)

== Origins ==
Lieutenant General David Henderson originally proposed that Royal Air Force officers use a combination of British Army and Royal Navy ranks. However, the War Office argued that the RAF should have its own ranks and the Admiralty opposed any use of their rank titles.

=== Badges of rank ===
On 1 April 1918, Air Force Memorandum 2 specified rank insignia for the newly established independent force. Rank was to be worn on the jacket cuff and was derived from the Royal Navy's rings, each equivalent rank having the same number of rings. However, second lieutenants (now pilot officers) displayed a crowned eagle only and the Navy's loop was not used for any rank. Depending on the uniform, either gold or pale blue on grey braid was worn.

In August 1918, Air Ministry Weekly Order 617 added a single band of 1/4-inch (6 mm) braid below the second lieutenant's eagle and all other officer ranks also received a crowned eagle above their braid on the left arm only.

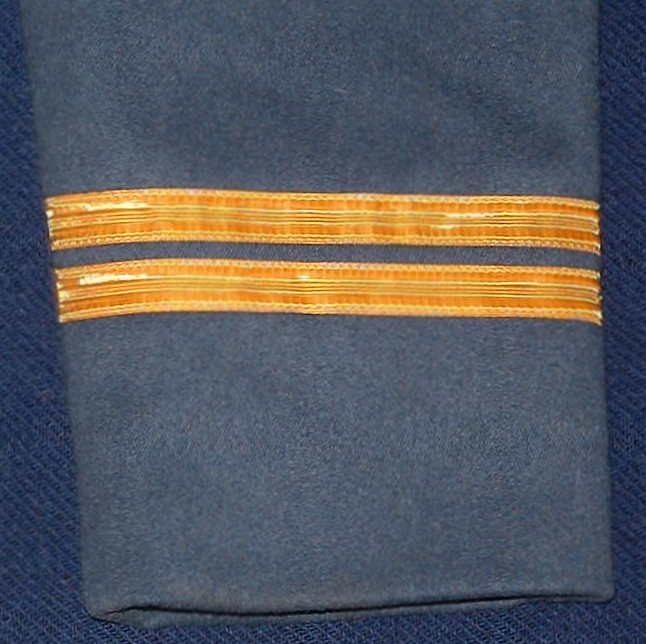
RAF mess dress cuff insignia for a flight lieutenant

In 1919 the colour of the rank braid was changed to black with a central pale blue stripe. However, on RAF mess dress rank continued to be displayed in gold.

=== Sleeve ranks ===
The ranks worn on the sleeve are common to all RAF uniform variants incorporating the Jacket. The centre of the rank (measured from the bottom of the lowest braid to the top of the highest) should be 3 3/4 inches (9.5 cm) from the cuff and each row of braiding should have a space of 1/8 inch (3 mm) from other rows. The thinnest braid, as found on the pilot officer's rank (and in the middle of the squadron leader's rank), is 1/4 inch (6 mm); the flying officer's braid common to all the ranks except air commodore and pilot officer, is 1/2 inch (1.3 cm), and the thickest braid, as found on all air officer ranks, is 2 inches (5.1 cm).

=== Shoulder boards ===
Air officers' ceremonial shoulder board

Shoulder board of marshal of the RAF

Shoulder boards (as shown) are worn by officers of air rank (air commodore and above). Officers entitled to wear aiguillettes or the Royal Cypher, AVMs and above, the Director of Nursing Services, and those officers assigned to certain one-star posts, wear plain blue shoulder boards when in No 1 Service Dress. AVMs and above and those officers assigned to the one-star posts of commandant RAFC Cranwell, Air Officer Wales and Air Officer Scotland wear distinctive unranked ceremonial shoulder boards when in No 1A (ceremonial day) dress. If these officers wear a greatcoat, gold ranked shoulder straps in Crombie material are used. Marshals of the Royal Air Force have a distinctive set of shoulder boards which show the air officer's eagle and wreath, two crossed marshal's batons and the Royal Crown.

=== Rank titles ===
It was initially proposed that each RAF officer rank would be either the equivalent army rank (used by the Royal Flying Corps) or the naval rank (used by the Royal Naval Air Service (RNAS)). However, when the Royal Navy and British Army were consulted they made differing objections: the navy was unhappy that another service might use the names of its higher ranks, such as admiral, and the army objected to the RAF sharing the ranks assigned to junior officers. This resulted in a second proposed system, which made frequent use of the neologism ardian, which was derived from the Gaelic ard "chief" and eun "bird". Under this proposal the names were to have been: ensign, lieutenant, flight leader, squadron leader, reeve, banneret, fourth ardian, third ardian, second ardian, ardian and air marshal. A further proposal was: ensign, lieutenant, flight-leader, squadron-leader, wing-leader, leader, flight ardian, squadron ardian, wing ardian, ardian, air marshal. However, this system was rejected within the RAF, due in part to dislike of the neologism ardian.

On 1 August 1919, Air Ministry Weekly Order 973 introduced the official rank titles for RAF officers. Initially, the highest air officer rank was named marshal of the air. However, a few days after this was promulgated, it was changed to marshal of the Royal Air Force; the original name was rejected by King George V, who believed it was as useless as "Admiral of the Atlantic" These were often modified versions of Royal Navy terms and in many cases represented a continuation of particular RNAS appointment titles, i.e. a role/command specific to a particular rank. For example, the new RAF rank of flight lieutenant had previously been the name of an RNAS appointment, held only by qualified pilots with the naval rank of lieutenant; a RNAS observer with the same rank was instead known as an observer lieutenant. The RAF rank of squadron leader was derived from an RNAS appointment, squadron commander, which had been held by either a naval lieutenant-commander or lieutenant.

=== Composite braid ===
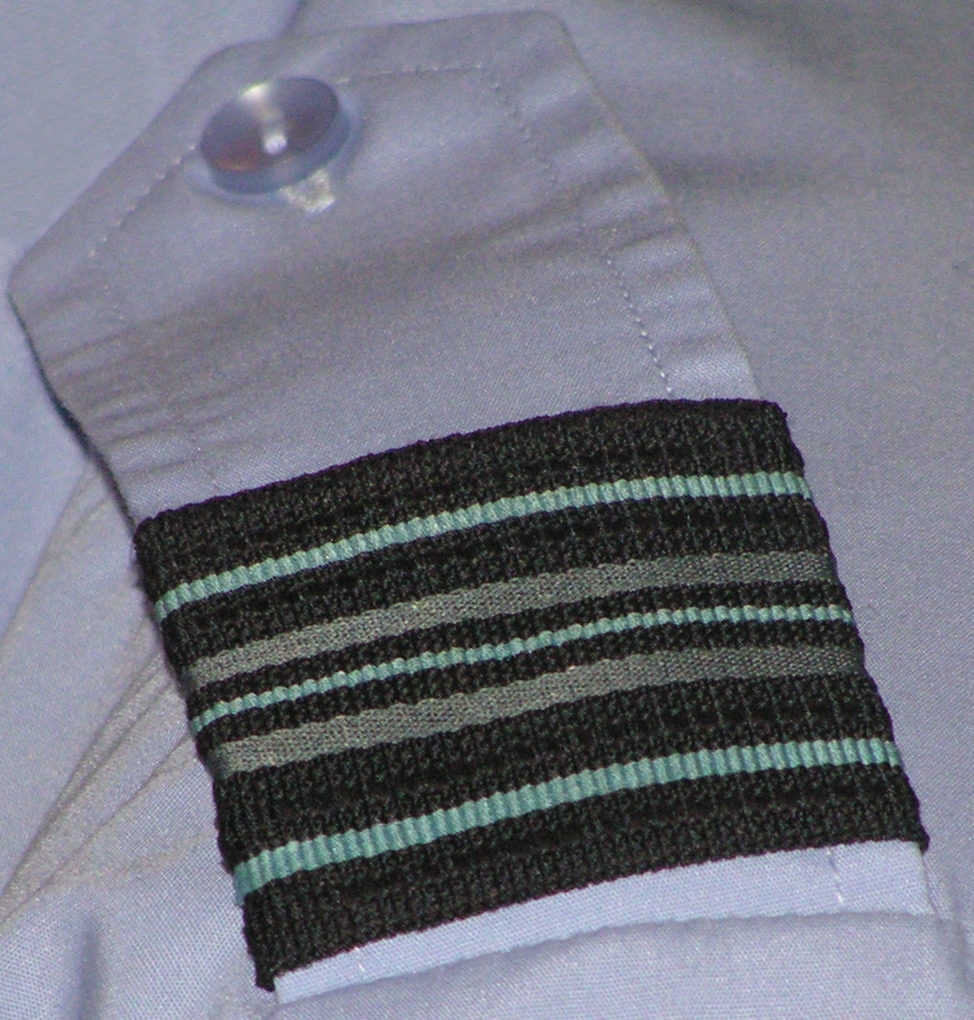
Composite braid as worn by a squadron leader

RAF officers typically wear composite braid rank slides with their working and operational uniforms. Composite braid consists of a single piece of fabric, where the "background" between the rank rings is made from blue-grey or olive green material. Composite braid rank slides are often referred to as "bar-code" in RAF slang.

== Distinction between ranks and appointments ==
Many RAF ranks do not imply the appointment or duties of an officer. For example, a pilot officer may well not be trained to pilot an aircraft. In fact, pilots skip the rank of pilot officer and go from officer cadet to flying officer on graduation from officer training school at RAF Cranwell. A squadron leader does not necessarily command a squadron, nor a wing commander necessarily command a wing, nor a group captain command a group.

A group will usually be commanded by an AVM. 'Flying' wings will be commanded by a group captain, with ground-based wings commanded by a wing commander. 'Flying' squadrons are commanded by wing commanders, and ground-based squadrons are typically commanded by squadron leaders.

== RAF Air Cadets (Air Training Corps and Combined Cadet Force) ==
The majority of officers in the Royal Air Force Air Cadets (the Air Training Corps and the RAF section of the Combined Cadet Force) are volunteers commissioned into RAF Air Cadets and then appointed to service with the Air Training Corps or Combined Cadet Force (RAF). They are no longer Royal Air Force Volunteer Reserve (Training Branch) (RAFVR(T)) commissioned officers. They are identified by the gold badge stating: "RAFAC" on the lapels of the No. 1 uniform, and in others forms of dress "RAF Air Cadets" embroidered underneath the rank insignia, in a manner similar to RAF Regiment rank slides. Volunteer officers who are members of an air experience flight (AEF) and who are pilots of aircraft providing air experience flying to air cadets and university air squadrons (UAS) continue to hold a VR(T) or VR(UAS) commission respectively.

RAF Air Cadets officers use the rank system identical to the regular RAF, but the highest substantive rank is Flying Officer. Other senior ranked appointments are generally full-time staff positions (such as regional commandants and commandant air cadets) held by regular and reserve (RAFR/FTRS) RAF officers. In certain circumstances, honorary appointments within the RAF Air Cadets may be made, however the rank may vary. After the Death of Queen Elizabeth II, new rank insignia with King Charles III's Royal Cypher is expected to be created.

== Timeline of changes ==
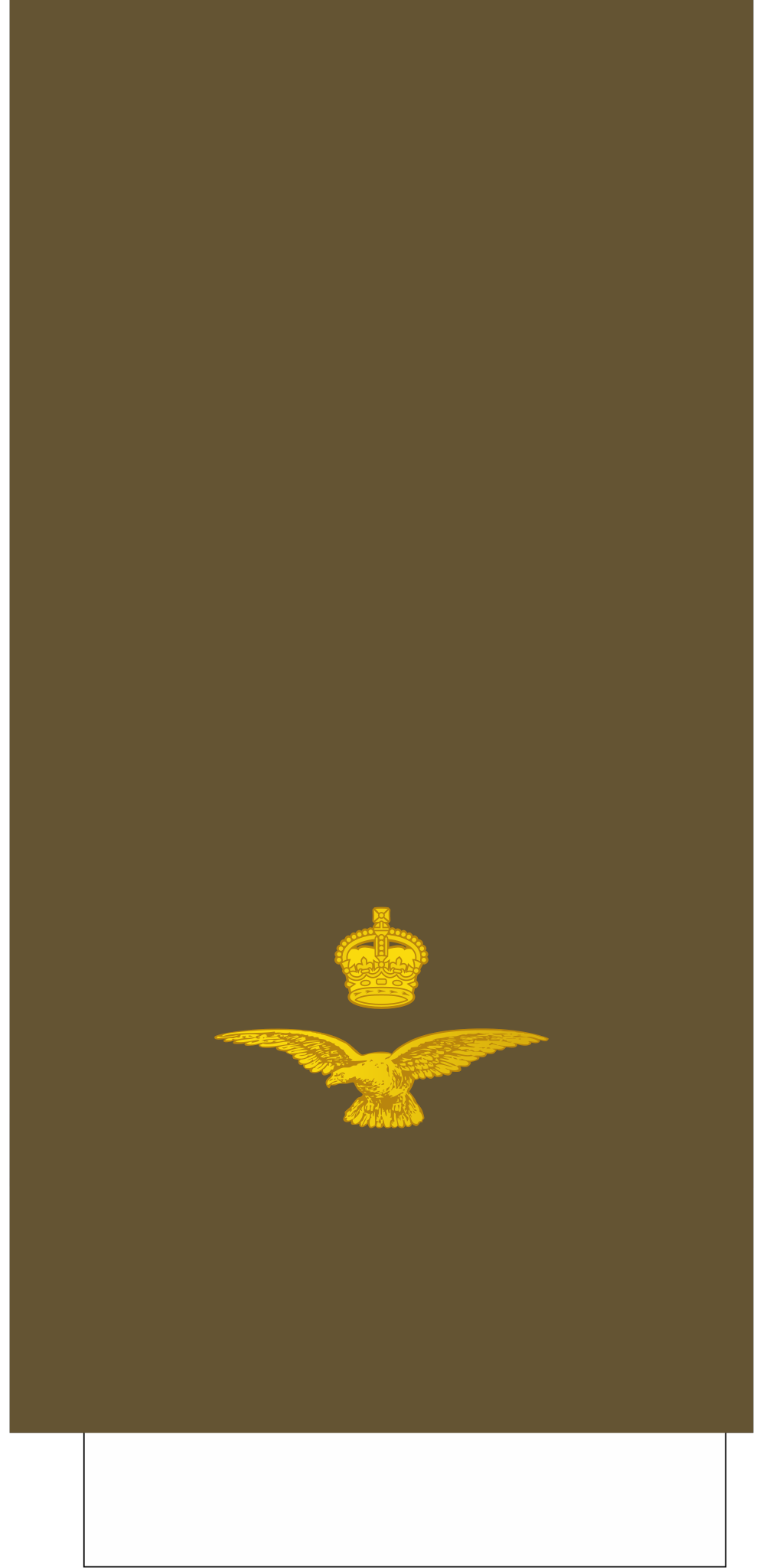
Rank group	General / flag officers					Senior officers					Junior officers
Royal Flying Corps (1912–April 1918)
Royal Flying Corps (1912–April 1918)			Lieutenant-General	Major-General	Brigadier-General	Colonel	Lieutenant Colonel		Major		Captain		Lieutenant	2nd lieutenant
Royal Naval Air Service (1914–April 1918)
Royal Naval Air Service (1914–April 1918)						Wing captain	Wing commander in the role of wing captain	Wing commander	Squadron commander (>8 years seniority)	Squadron commander (<8 years seniority)	Flight commander	Flight lieutenant	Flight sub-lieutenant	Flight midshipman
April 1918–August 1918
August 1918–1919
August 1918–1919		General	Lieutenant-General	Major-General	Brigadier-General	Colonel	Lieutenant Colonel		Major		Captain		Lieutenant	2nd lieutenant
1919–present
1919–present	Marshal of the RAF	Air chief marshal	Air marshal	Air vice-marshal	Air commodore	Group captain	Wing commander		Squadron leader		Flight lieutenant		Flying officer	Pilot officer /acting pilot officer
Royal Observer Corps (1925–1996)
Royal Observer Corps (1925–1996)					Air commodore	Observer captain	Observer commander		Observer lieutenant commander		Observer lieutenant		Observer officer
NATO code	OF-10	OF-9	OF-8	OF-7	OF-6	OF-5	OF-4		OF-3		OF-2		OF-1

== See also ==
- Aircrew brevet
- Comparative military ranks of World War I
- Comparative military ranks of World War II
- Comparative military ranks
- List of Royal Air Force members
- Military rank
- RAF other ranks
- Ranks and insignia of officers in NATO air forces
- Ranks of the cadet forces of the United Kingdom
- Royal Observer Corps ranks
- Women's Auxiliary Air Force ranks

== General references ==
- Hobart, Malcolm. Badges and Uniforms of the Royal Air Force. London/Barnsley, England: Leo Cooper/Pen & Sword Books Ltd., 2000. ISBN 0-85052-739-2.
