= Windrush, Gloucestershire =

Village in England

Coordinates: 51.804°N 1.735°W

Windrush
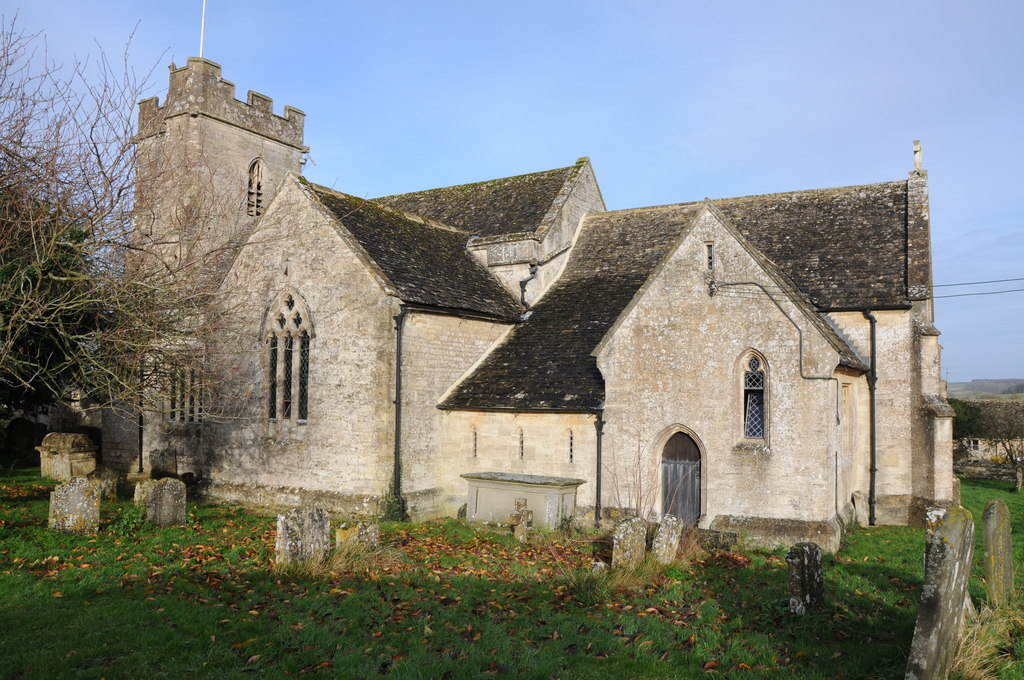
- Windrush church

- Location within Gloucestershire
- District: Cotswold
- Shire county: Gloucestershire
- Region: South West
- Country: England
- Sovereign state: United Kingdom
- Post town: CHELTENHAM
- Postcode district: OX18
- Dialling code: 01451
- Police: Gloucestershire
- Fire: Gloucestershire
- Ambulance: South Western
- UK Parliament: North Cotswolds

Windrush is a village and civil parish in Gloucestershire, England, approximately five miles southeast of Northleach. It lies in the Cotswolds on the River Windrush, from which it derives its name. The village name is first attested in the Domesday Book of 1086, where it appears as Wenric.

== History ==
The National Gazetteer of Great Britain and Ireland (1868) says:

WINDRUSH, a parish in the lower division of Slaughter hundred, county Gloucester, 5 miles S.E. of Northleach. The village is situated on the Windrush rivulet, which rises among the Cotswold hills, and joins the Thames near Standlake. There is a valuable quarry of white oolite building stone belonging to Lord Sherborne. The living is a vicarage, united to that of Sherborne in 1776. The church, dedicated to St. Peter, contains some old tombs. There are day and Sunday schools, chiefly supported by Lord Sherborne. The charities produce about £24 per annum, besides 10 acres of poor's land.

During the Second World War, the parish hosted RAF Windrush, a Royal Air Force Relief Landing Ground. Although it closed for military purposes in 1945, the airfield remains in use for light aircraft and still has its control tower.

== Governance ==
Windrush forms part of the Cotswold District, which together with Gloucestershire County Council provides local government services. It is part of the parliamentary constituency of North Cotswolds represented in parliament by the Conservative Sir Geoffrey Clifton-Brown.

== Notable people ==
Thomas Keble, the younger brother of John Keble and also a notable Church of England clergyman, had charge of the parish of Windrush in the early 19th century.
