= East Midlands Universities Air Squadron =

University flying squadron of the Royal Air Force

- Active: 1941 – present
- Country: United Kingdom
- Branch: Royal Air Force
- Type: Flying training school
- Role: University Air Squadrons and Air Experience Flights
- Part of: RAF College Cranwell
- Headquarters: RAF Cranwell
- Aircraft: Grob Tutor T1

Commanders
- Current commander: Sqn Ldr O. Thornton (2024-present)

The East Midlands Universities Air Squadron (EMUAS) is the Nottinghamshire-centred University Air Squadron for the East Midlands.

== History ==
It was formed on 26 February 1941 as University College Nottingham Air Squadron then became Nottingham University Air Squadron in 1948; the unit's regalia has consequent echoes of Robin Hood.

In the 1950s there were 17 university air squadrons. With the advent of ground-breaking jet aircraft in the 1960s, places for the unit were much sought after. In November 1967 the unit took its present name, to include the University of Leicester and Loughborough University. It held its annual dinner at the University of Nottingham, often with one of the university vice-chancellors present.

== Structure ==
Training is delivered by No. 6 Flying Training School RAF in south Lincolnshire, off the A17, also the home of the Central Flying School (CFS) where all UK military pilots first train.

Prior to 2001, training was in Nottinghamshire. It takes around 35 students a year, from September to early October. The unit has 8 staff, and meets each week, close to the west entrance of the University of Nottingham.

== Commanding Officers ==
- A/Wg Cdr C.M. Attlee (1941-1945)
- Sqn Ldr E.J.C. Richardson (1945-1946)
- Sqn Ldr E. Cornish (1946-1948)
- Sqn Ldr R. Hewitt AFC (1948-1952)
- Sqn Ldr R.P. Elliott DFC (1952-1955)
- Sqn Ldr N. Fletcher (1955-1957)
- Sqn Ldr W.D. Hooper AFC (1957-1958)
- Sqn Ldr H.S. Horth AFC (1958-1962)
- Sqn Ldr D.R. Atkinson (1962-1965)
- Sqn Ldr R.D. Williamson (1965-1967)
- Sqn Ldr M.S. Wild (1967-1970)
- Sqn Ldr A.R.P. Phipps (1970-1973)
- Sqn Ldr M.B.M. Canavan (1973-1975)
- Sqn Ldr M. Dales (1975-1978)
- Sqn Ldr Brookes (1978-1981)
- Sqn Ldr A.J. Thorpe (1981-1984)
- Sqn Ldr R.B.G. Milton (1984-1986)
- Sqn Ldr M.J. Hunt (1986-1990)
- Sqn Ldr R.D. Gregory (1990-1993)
- Sqn Ldr S.J. Orwell (1993-1994)
- Sqn Ldr I.A. Torrance (1994-1996)
- Sqn Ldr J.Q. Hallwood (1996-1999)
- Sqn Ldr S.J.R. Harcourt (1999-2002)
- Sqn Ldr D.J. Middleton (2002-2005)
- Sqn Ldr (Retd) R.D. Gregory (2005)
- Sqn Ldr R.J. Bousfield (2005-2006)
- Flt Lt C. Nicol (2006)
- Sqn Ldr I.G. Kirkby (2006-2009)
- Sqn Ldr J.D. Leighton (2009-2011)
- Flt Lt R. Marston (2011)
- Sqn Ldr J.W. Clark (2011-2014)
- Sqn Ldr A.M. Tagg (2014-2017)
- Sqn Ldr G.W. MacInnes (2017-2018)
- Sqn Ldr D. Berris (2018-2021)
- Sqn Ldr M.W. Waring (2021-2024)
- Sqn Ldr O. Thornton (2024-present)

== Alumni ==
- Sqn Ldr Jon Bond from Epping in Essex, Red Arrows pilot 2018–2021 and leader from 2024, Air Transport Management at Loughborough University in 2005, joined the RAF in 2007
- Air Chief Marshal Simon Bryant, Geography at the University of Nottingham
- Flt Lt Sean Cunningham, Red Arrows pilot, he studied Electrical and Electronic Engineering at Nottingham Trent University
- Helen Gardiner who, aged 27, made the first interception by a female RAF pilot on Tuesday 10 September 1996 at RAF Leuchars, with navigator Martin Harris in 43 Sqn. Helen, educated at Worksop College, had joined the squadron in May 1995, after studying Economics from 1987-90 at the University of Nottingham; as Flying Officer Helen Dobbs, she was the RAF's first female fighter pilot in 1993; aged 24, she had qualified in June 1993 from RAF Chivenor; by May 1998 there were four RAF female fast jet pilots; Helen was the only one to fly the Tornado F3
- Flt Lt Patrick Kershaw, Business Administration at De Montfort University, joined the RAF in 2006, Red Arrows from 2022
- Air Vice-Marshal Suraya Marshall, Law at the University of Nottingham, navigator from 1994 on the Tornado F3, Commandant from December 2019 to October 2021 of Royal Air Force College Cranwell
- Desmond Penrose FRAeS (1930-2025), de Havilland test pilot in the early 1960s, on the development of the Hawker Siddeley Trident, Aeronautical Engineering, Loughborough 1951
- Sqn Ldr Henry Prince, Loughborough College (joined the Nottingham University Air Squadron), Red Arrows from 1965 in the first team and Yellowjacks
- Merlyn Rees, the former student leader of Goldsmiths College, being evacuated to Nottingham around 1942, and later joined 324 Squadron in Italy, as an intelligence officer, where he served under Group Captain W. G. G. Duncan Smith, the father of Conservative MP Sir Iain Duncan Smith; Merlyn was Labour Home Secretary from 1976-79

== See also ==
- University Air Squadron units
- University Royal Naval Unit, the Royal Navy equivalent
- Officers Training Corps, the British Army equivalent
- List of Royal Air Force aircraft squadrons
