= No. 15 Flying Training School RAF =

Former Royal Air Force flying training school

No. 15 Flying Training School
- Active: 1 May 1939 - 1 March 1942; 23 February 1952 – 12 May 1952
- Country: United Kingdom
- Branch: Royal Air Force
- Role: Military Pilot training

No. 15 Flying Training School (15 FTS) is a former Royal Air Force flying training school that operated between 1939 and 1952.
