= Leuchars Station =

British Army installation and airfield in Fife, Scotland

Leuchars Station
- Near Leuchars, Fife in Scotland
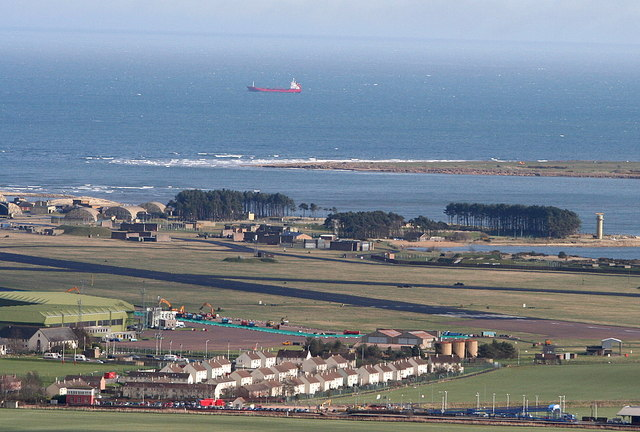
- Aerial view looking east over Leuchars.

Site information
- Type: Army barracks and airfield
- Owner: Ministry of Defence
- Operator: British Army
- Open to the public: No

Location
- Location in Fife
- Coordinates: 56°22′23″N 002°52′07″W

Site history
- Built: 1916
- In use: 1916–2015 (Royal Air Force); 2015 – present (British Army)

Garrison information
- Current commander: Lieutenant Colonel Chris Majcher

Airfield information
- Identifiers: IATA: ADX, ICAO: EGQL, WMO: 03171
- Elevation: 12 metres (39 ft) AMSL
Runways
Direction	Length and surface
08/26	2,586 metres (8,484 ft) Asphalt

Leuchars Station (IATA: ADX, ICAO: EGQL) is a British Army installation located in Leuchars, Fife, on the east coast of Scotland, near to the historic town of St Andrews.

Formerly RAF Leuchars, it was the second most northerly air defence station in the United Kingdom (the most northerly being RAF Lossiemouth). The station ceased to be an RAF station in April 2015 when control of the site was transferred to the Army.

== History ==
=== RAF Leuchars ===
The Royal Air Force station at Leuchars opened on 16 March 1920, although its association with the military can be traced back to 1911 when military balloons were operated at the site. During its history the site was used as a RNAS fleet fighter station and later as a RAF Coastal Command airfield. Throughout the Cold War and beyond, the station was home to fighter aircraft which policed northern UK airspace. The station also hosted an annual International Airshow.

=== Transfer to the Army ===
On 18 July 2011, Defence Secretary Liam Fox announced that RAF Leuchars would close as part of the Strategic Defence and Security Review 2010, with the station being transferred to British Army control in 2015 and the Typhoon aircraft based at Leuchars moving to RAF Lossiemouth in Moray.

In preparation for the closure, RAF Leuchars Mountain Rescue Team disbanded in November 2013 whilst No. 58 Squadron of the RAF Regiment and No. 6 Force Protection Wing disbanded on 10 May 2014. No. 6 Squadron was the first Typhoon unit to depart Leuchars, heading for its new home at Lossiemouth in June 2014. No. 1 Squadron followed on 8 September 2014, at which point responsibility for Quick Reaction Alert (North) was transferred from Leuchars to Lossiemouth.

Control of Leuchars was transferred to the British Army on 31 March 2015, when it was renamed Leuchars Station. The term 'station' was used as the size of the installation is smaller than a garrison but larger than a barracks and to reflect the range of army and RAF occupants. The Royal Scots Dragoon Guards gradually relocated from Germany in the spring and summer of 2015 along with 2 Close Support Battalion of the Royal Electrical and Mechanical Engineers and 110 Provost Company, Royal Military Police. The transition from RAF to Army control was considered to have gone smoothly by Fife Council in terms of its impact on the local community.

In February 2018, local councillors suggested that the name of the installation be changed as it could be confused with Leuchars Railway Station.

RAF Typhoon FGR4 aircraft and the Quick Reaction Alert (Interceptor) North capability operated from Leuchars between 10 August and the week commencing 16 October 2020 whilst the intersection of RAF Lossiemouth's two runways was resurfaced.

== Role and operations ==
In December 2018, there were approximately 750 members of the UK regular armed forces, 30 members of the full time reserve service personnel and 100 civil servants based at Leuchars.

=== British Army ===
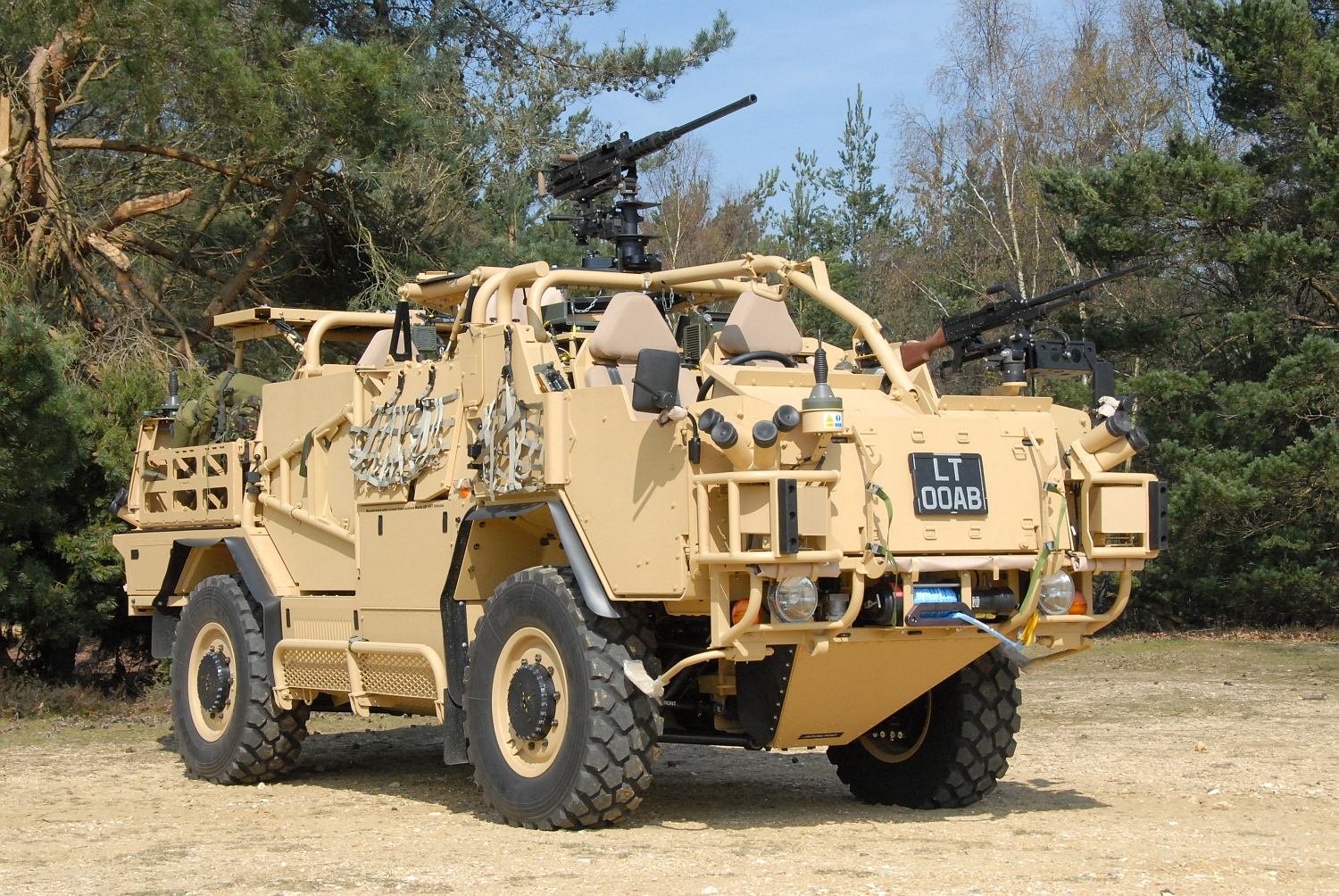
A Jackal 2 armoured wheeled vehicle as used by the Royal Scots Dragoon Guards based at Leuchars

The primary Army unit based at Leuchars is the Royal Scots Dragoon Guards. It is a cavalry regiment which specialises in the reconnaissance role. It is equipped with the Jackal 2 armoured fighting vehicle and the Coyote tactical support vehicle.

Other army units included 2 Close Support Battalion of the Royal Electrical and Mechanical Engineers (REME).

=== Royal Air Force ===
The station continues to be home to several RAF units, including No. 612 (County of Aberdeen) Squadron RAuxAF, the East of Scotland Universities Air Squadron incorporating No. 12 Air Experience Flight, and the headquarters of Scotland and Northern Ireland Region and Central Scotland Wing of the Air Training Corps.

The airfield is maintained by the RAF as a diversion airfield for military aircraft.

=== Airfield use ===
Although the Ministry of Defence explored options in 2020 to increase mixed civilian and military usage, Leuchars ended all civilian and executive aircraft operations following the retirement of the airfield's primary and secondary radar systems on 1 July 2026. The station had previously handled executive flights primarily tied to golf events in nearby St Andrews, logging 100 private movements between October 2023 and October 2025. Military air traffic control and light training operations remain active.

== Based units ==
The following notable units are based at Leuchars Station.

=== British Army ===
Royal Engineers (8 Engineer Brigade, 12 (Force Support) Engineer Group)

- 71 Engineer Regiment (Army Reserve)
  - Regimental Headquarters
  - 124 Field Squadron (Air Support)
    - 2 Troop

Royal Electrical and Mechanical Engineers (102 Logistics Brigade)

- 2 Close Support Battalion
  - Battalion Headquarters
  - 7 Close Support Company
  - 11 Close Support Company
  - Echelon Company

Royal Armoured Corps (7th Light Mechanised Brigade (United Kingdom))

- Royal Scots Dragoon Guards

=== Royal Air Force ===
- RAF Airfield Operations

No. 22 Group (Training) RAF

- East of Scotland Universities Air Squadron – Grob Tutor T1
- No. 12 Air Experience Flight – Grob Tutor T1
- Royal Air Force Air Cadets (RAFAC)
  - Scotland & Northern Ireland Region Headquarters
  - Central Scotland Wing Headquarters
  - Regional Activity Centre
  - No. 2345 Squadron

No. 38 Group (Air Combat Service Support) RAF

- Tactical Medical Wing
  - No. 612 (County of Aberdeen) Squadron (Royal Auxiliary Air Force)

== See also ==
- Armed forces in Scotland
- Military history of Scotland
- List of British Army installations
- List of Royal Air Force stations
