= University Air Squadron =

- Country: United Kingdom
- Branch: Royal Air Force
- Type: Training establishment University Service Units
- Role: Officer Training
- Size: 15 Squadrons
- Part of: No. 6 Flying Training School RAF; RAF Volunteer Reserve
- Website: Official website

Insignia
- Abbreviation: UAS

Aircraft flown
- Trainer: Tutor T1

University Air Squadrons (UAS), are Royal Air Force Volunteer Reserve units under the command of No. 6 Flying Training School RAF. They offer training and flight training to university students, with the goal of attracting students into a career as an RAF officer after university. Primarily its goal is achieved through delivery of this training as well as force development, adventure training and leadership development to its members. These provide a taste of life in the service and to give experience to their members in preparation for taking up a career as an officer in one of the RAF's many branches. Members are under no obligation to continue service after university and may resign at any time.

Members of the UAS are attested personnel of the RAF Volunteer Reserve (RAFVR) and are paid for their service. Upon joining students hold the rank of Officer Cadet (OF-D). Some go on to obtain commissions in the RAF Volunteer Reserve while still studying for their degree, Others may choose to seek a commission in the Regular or Reserve forces of the RAF after their degree, while some others choose to stop training with the RAF after leaving university.

On the run-up to World War II the squadrons were an important source of pilots for the RAF during the Battle of Britain. Officer Cadets, who were already members of the RAFVR, were called up for active service in the middle of studying for their degrees.

Many UAS squadrons are parents to Air Experience Flights (AEF) which provide an experience of flying to Air Cadets.

== Training and selection ==
To apply for the UAS a person must be enrolled on an undergraduate course at a British University, and express an interest to their local UAS squadron at their freshers fair, following this a prospective candidate will then submit an application. From there selection interviews take place to pick candidates who will move forward to join the UAS. Candidates must also pass a RAF entry fitness test and medical. After completing the selection process successfully candidates are formally attested and mustered at the rank of Officer Cadet, and their training can commence.

Members are expected to attend training nights, usually on a weekly basis, as well as attending several annual training camps. The flying syllabus of 56 sorties follows Elementary Flying Training (EFT). The flying training is supplemented with ground training and adventure training, both in the UK and abroad.

=== Flying Training ===
Most UAS training is a cut-down version of EFT and focuses on training the student to various levels of solo standard.

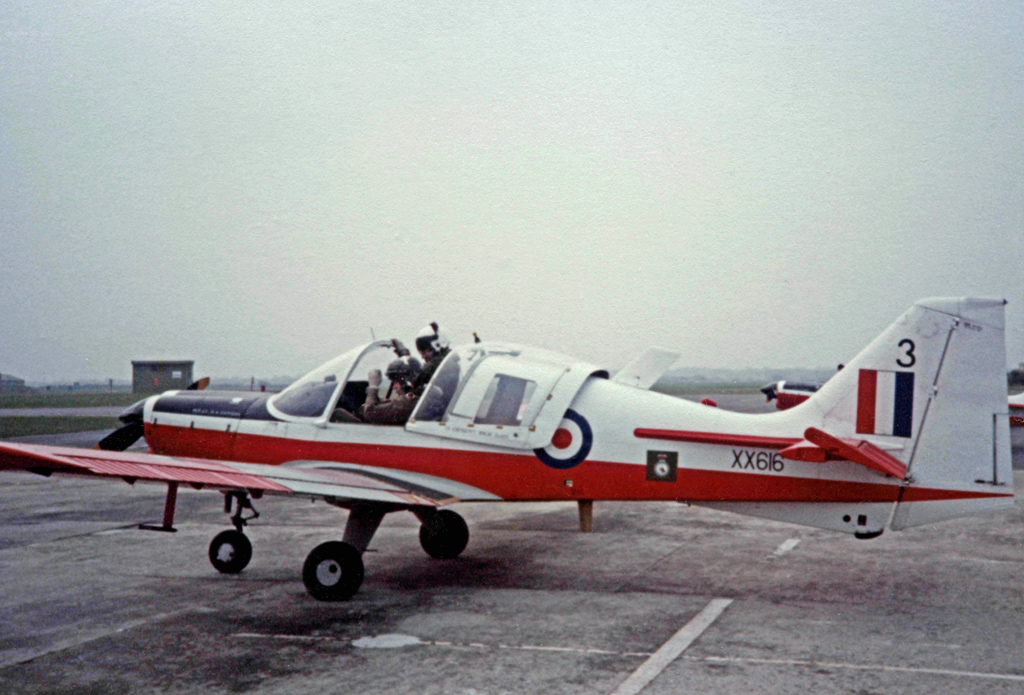
Manchester University Air Squadron Scottish Aviation Bulldog at RAF Woodvale in 1983

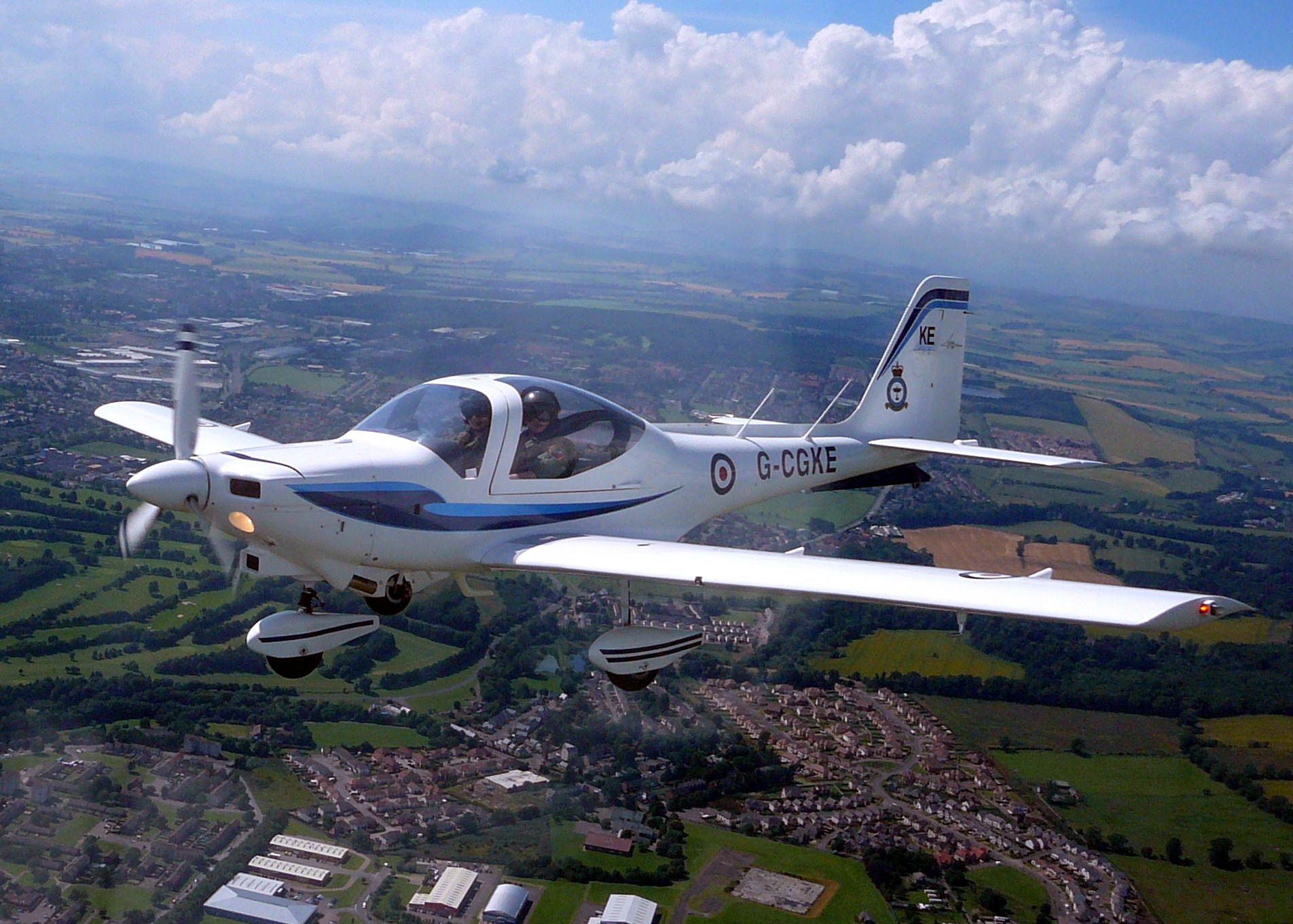
A Grob Tutor T1, belonging to the University of Birmingham Air Squadron, in flight over Scotland

Successful completion of the Core Syllabus qualifies the student pilot for the award of the Preliminary Flying Badge (PFB), or 'Budgie Wings' as they are sometimes called.

For those Officer Cadets who finish the Core syllabus with time remaining on the squadron, an advanced syllabus has recently been introduced consisting of Aerobatics, Formation Flying and Low Level Navigation. There is no specific time requirement as with the core syllabus, as progress in the advanced phase is made at a rate by which the student pilot is able to achieve the desired results.

=== Ground Training ===
Beyond flying, UASs follow a loose Ground Training syllabus. Although squadrons generally do not follow the syllabus as a training plan, the majority of subjects are covered at some point through the students' academic year. These can include attending Adventure Training expeditions, both overseas and within the UK, learning drill, undertaking a fieldcraft exercise such as the recent 'STRIKE' exercises run from RAFC Cranwell, understanding the principles of air power and developing leadership skills. Air Power Force Development Experiences are also undertaken to encourage an understanding of air power in both a historical and contemporary context.

As the UAS continues to move beyond its former role of providing Elementary Flying Training to RAF Direct Entry students and UAS Students, more and more ground training opportunities are becoming available, making the UASs more suitable for Officer Cadets pursuing careers in the military other than as aircrew. However, the emphasis and priority remain on flying as the core function of each UAS. In 2003 it was estimated that 60% of pilots recruited into the Royal Air Force came through the UAS system.

In addition to a two-week period of continuous training in the summer, UAS Officer Cadets are typically required to participate in one training night a week during the university terms. This usually entails a guest speaker presenting on an aspect of the RAF or the military to develop service knowledge. Most squadrons also offer camps at Easter, Christmas, and September for Officer Cadets to undertake intensive periods of sport, flying and adventure training.

A limited number of week-long Summer Vacation Attachments (SVA) at another RAF base are offered to cadet, where they are seconded to an active regular RAF unit to learn more about their role.

=== Adventurous Personal Development Training (APDT) ===
In accordance with the ground training syllabus, there are opportunities for Officer Cadets to participate in APDT.

There are frequent squadron expeditions in areas within the UK and overseas in Europe as well as Peru, Canada and Mongolia. Expeditions can include all manner of adventurous training, such as mountain biking, parachuting, alpine sports, rock climbing, abseiling, white water rafting, coasteering, gorge walking and canoeing.

=== Sports ===
In accordance with the ground training syllabus, there are many opportunities for Officer Cadets to participate in inter-UAS sports competitions.

The UASs hold annual sporting competitions such as;

- Superteams - mixed events whereby squadron's compete in a test of physical strength and courage.
- Swimming
- Football - The Broadgate Cup (named after the Town Headquarters location of East Midlands Universities Air Squadron)
- Hockey - The Balti & Korma Cup
- Volleyball
- Netball
- Cross-country running

== Units and base locations ==
University Air Squadrons

Name	Acronym	Flying Base
University of Birmingham Air Squadron	UBAS	RAF Cosford
Bristol University Air Squadron	BUAS	MoD Boscombe Down
Cambridge University Air Squadron	CUAS	RAF Wittering
East Midlands Universities Air Squadron	EMUAS	RAF Cranwell
East of Scotland Universities Air Squadron	ESUAS	Leuchars Station
Universities of Glasgow and Strathclyde Air Squadron	UGSAS	Glasgow Airport
Liverpool University Air Squadron	LUAS	RAF Woodvale
University of London Air Squadron	ULAS	RAF Wittering
Manchester and Salford Universities Air Squadron	MASUAS	RAF Woodvale
Northumbrian Universities Air Squadron	NUAS	RAF Leeming
Northern Ireland Universities Air Squadron	NIUAS	Aldergrove Flying Station
Oxford University Air Squadron	OUAS	RAF Benson
Southampton University Air Squadron	SUAS	MoD Boscombe Down
Universities of Wales Air Squadron	UWAS	MoD St Athan
Yorkshire Universities Air Squadron	YUAS	RAF Leeming

=== Former squadrons ===
Previously there have been other UAS, with some merging overtime and others disbanding.

UAS	Formed	Disbanded	Airfields used	Notes
Aberdeen Universities Air Squadron	1941	1981		Became Aberdeen, Dundee & St. Andrews Universities Air Squadron
Aberdeen, Dundee & St. Andrews Universities Air Squadron	1981	2003		Became East of Scotland Universities Air Squadron
Aberystwyth University Air Squadron	1941	1945		
Queens University Air Squadron	1941	1996		
Cardiff University Air Squadron	1941	1943		
Durham University Air Squadron	1941	1963		Became Northumbrian Universities Air Squadron
East Lowlands Universities Air Squadron	1969	2003		Became East of Scotland Universities Air Squadron
Edinburgh Universities Air Squadron	1941	1969		Became East Lowlands Universities Air Squadron
Exeter University Air Squadron	1941	1943		
Hull University Air Squadron	1941	1969		Became Yorkshire Universities Air Squadron
Leeds University Air Squadron	1941	1969		Became Yorkshire Universities Air Squadron
Nottingham University Air Squadron	1941	1967		Became East Midlands Universities Air Squadron
St. Andrews University Air Squadron	1941	1969		Became East Lowlands Universities Air Squadron
Sheffield University Air Squadron	1941	1943		
Swansea University Air Squadron	1941	1946		

== See also ==
- University Royal Naval Unit, the Royal Navy equivalent
- Officers Training Corps, the British Army equivalent
- Air Force Reserve Officer Training Corps, the United States Air Force equivalent
- List of Royal Air Force aircraft squadrons
- Defence Technical Undergraduate Scheme
