= Junior officer =

Lowest operational commissioned officer

Junior officer, company officer or company grade officer refers to the lowest operational commissioned officer category of ranks in a military or paramilitary organization, ranking above non-commissioned officers and below senior officers.

== Duties ==
Junior officers are responsible for commanding small groups of enlisted personnel. Depending on their branch and specialty, junior officers may operate and maintain complex systems, such as weapons, vehicles, communication systems, or aircraft. They manage teams, oversee daily operations, and ensure the welfare and discipline of their subordinates. Junior officers are often tasked with planning, coordinating, and supervising tasks or missions. This might involve logistics, tactical oversight, or administrative tasks. Since junior officers are in the early stages of their careers, they are expected to develop leadership, strategic thinking, and operational expertise through experience and formal training.

== Countries ==
=== United States ===
The terms company officer or company-grade officer are used more in the Army, Air Force, or Marine Corps as the ranks of captain, lieutenant grades and other subaltern ranks originated from the officers in command of a company or equivalent (Cavalry troop and artillery battery). In many armed forces, a junior officer is specifically a commissioned officer holding rank equivalent to a naval lieutenant, an army captain or a flight lieutenant or below. In the United States Armed Forces, the term junior officer is used by the Navy, Coast Guard, Public Health Service, and NOAA Corps for officers in the ranks of chief warrant officer (W-2 to W-4), ensign (O-1), lieutenant (junior grade) (O-2), and lieutenant (O-3).

== See also ==
- Enlisted rank
  - Non-commissioned officer
- Officer (armed forces)
  - Field officer
  - General officer
  - Lieutenant grades
  - Subaltern
- Warrant officer
