= Trevor Freeman =

Royal New Zealand Air Force officer

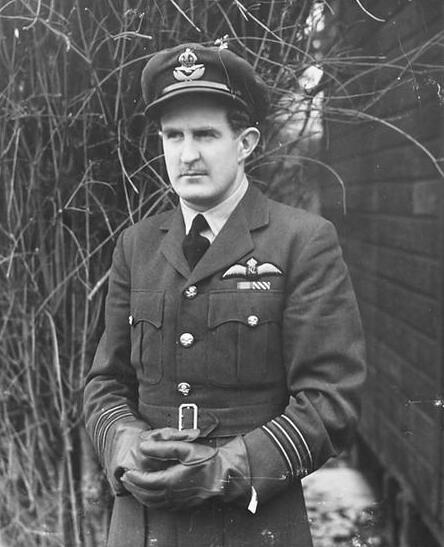
- Born: 5 June 1916; Lawrence, New Zealand
- Died: 17 December 1943 (aged 27) (MIA); Near New Ireland, Solomon Islands
- Military career
- Allegiance: New Zealand
- Branch: Royal Air Force; Royal New Zealand Air Force
- Service years: 1936–1939 (RAF); 1939–1943 (RNZAF)
- Rank: Wing Commander
- Commands: No. 115 Squadron; RNZAF Fighter Wing
- Conflicts: Second World War: Bombing campaign against Germany; Solomon Islands campaign
- Awards: Distinguished Service Order; Distinguished Flying Cross & Bar

Trevor Owen Freeman DSO, DFC & Bar (5 June 1916 – 17 December 1943) was an officer in the Royal New Zealand Air Force (RNZAF) during the Second World War.

From Lawrence in New Zealand, Freeman joined the Royal Air Force in 1936 but transferred to the RNZAF in July 1939. He was part of the New Zealand Flight, organised to ferry several Vickers Wellington medium bombers to New Zealand later that year. Following the outbreak of the Second World War, the flight was the basis of No. 75 Squadron and became operational in March 1940. Freeman served with the squadron for the next several months as it carried out bombing raids to mainland Europe and was awarded the Distinguished Flying Cross (DFC). The following year he was given command of No. 115 Squadron, another bomber unit involved in the raids to Europe. By the end of his second tour of operations in October 1942 he had been awarded a Bar to his DFC and the Distinguished Service Order. He returned to New Zealand in early 1943 to serve in a staff role with the Air Department and then in September was sent to the Southwest Pacific. He led the RNZAF Fighter Wing from mid-October as it was engaged in the aerial suppression of the Japanese base at Rabaul as part of the Solomon Islands campaign. He went missing in action on 17 December 1943, after leading the wing in an engagement with Japanese fighters.

== Early life ==
Born on 5 June 1916 at Lawrence in Otago in New Zealand, Trevor Owen Freeman was educated at Macandrew School in Dunedin. He was interested in aviation as a teenager and gained his pilot's licence at the age of 17, while flying with the Otago Aero Club at Taieri Aerodrome. He subsequently travelled to the United Kingdom and in early 1936 joined the Royal Air Force (RAF). After completing his training, he was posted to No. 74 Squadron. Based at Hornchurch, this was equipped with Gloster Gauntlet fighters but in early 1939 commenced conversion to the Supermarine Spitfire fighter.

In July 1939, Freeman transferred to the Royal New Zealand Air Force (RNZAF) as a pilot officer and joined the New Zealand Flight. This had been established at Marham the previous month for the purpose of delivering Vickers Wellington medium bombers that had been purchased by the New Zealand government for the RNZAF. The aircrew, all pilots and navigators, were personnel of the RNZAF as well as several New Zealanders who were serving in the RAF at the time. The next few weeks were spent in training and preparing for the delivery flight to New Zealand.

== Second World War ==
On the outbreak of the Second World War, the Wellingtons of the New Zealand Flight were put at the disposal of the RAF, and the flight and its personnel subsequently became No. 75 Squadron. It spent several weeks working to become operational as well as coming up to strength with aircrew. Freeman flew as co-pilot to Squadron Leader Cyrus Kay on the squadron's first operational mission, on 27 March 1940; this was a sortie to Brunswick to drop propaganda pamphlets. He went on to fly several bombing missions to targets in Belgium, France, the Netherlands and Germany, and in October, he was awarded the Distinguished Flying Cross (DFC).

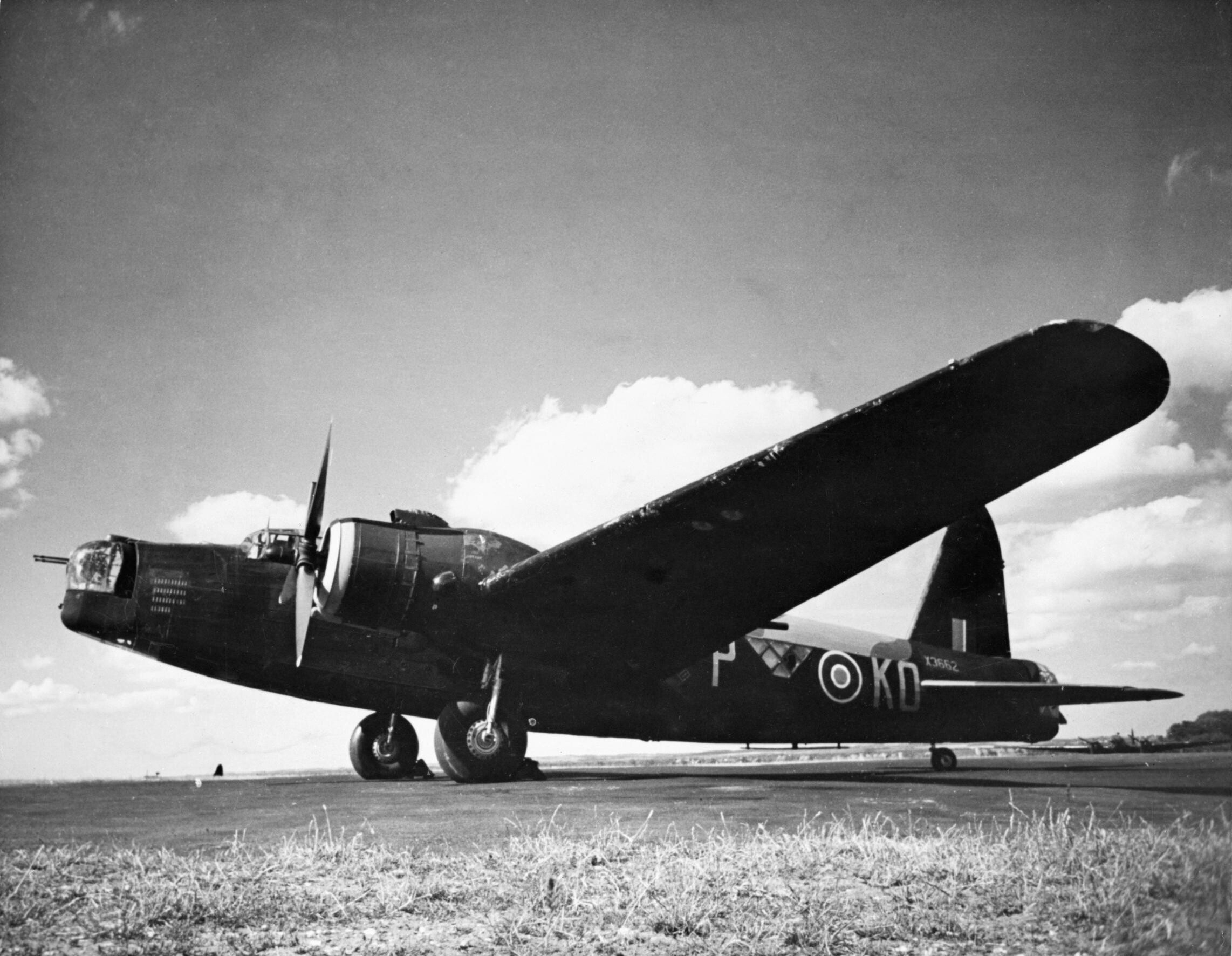
A Vickers Wellington medium bomber of No. 115 Squadron

Freeman was posted to the headquarters of No. 3 Group, where for the next few months he would organise navigational training. He was highly skilled in this field, being one of the few pilots in the RAF to hold a No. 1 Civil Navigator's Licence. Even though he was on training duties, he also flew operationally with inexperienced crews. In early 1941, Freeman was posted to No. 57 Squadron, which also operated Wellingtons, as a flight commander. He led the squadron's flight that was involved in the over one hundred bomber sortie on 24 July that targeted the German capital ships Gneisenau and Prinz Eugen docked at Brest.

Later in the year Freeman was appointed commander of No. 115 Squadron and flew extensively over the next several months. In December, he was awarded the Distinguished Service Order. He helped in the development of the 'Gee' navigation aid, which was seen as a major tool in Bomber Command's bombing offensive against Germany. His No. 115 Squadron was one of the first units to use 'Gee' on operations when it entered service in March 1942. On one sortie, bombing an aircraft factory at Warnemünde, his Wellington was damaged by anti-aircraft fire. He had to make the return flight to the United Kingdom on a single engine. Having completed two operational tours, involving 58 sorties, he was awarded a Bar to his DFC in August.

In February 1943 Freeman returned to New Zealand and the following month took up the post of Director of Operations at the Air Department in Wellington where he served for seven months. By this time he was married to Juliet Edwards, the daughter of Brigadier Maitland Edwards. The wedding had taken place the previous year.

=== Southwest Pacific ===
On 4 September Freeman was posted to the Southwest Pacific, to serve on the staff of the RNZAF's No. 1 (Islands) Group. Although a staff officer, he flew combat operations during the Solomon Islands campaign and on 11 October, he was wingman to Squadron Leader Guy Newton on a sortie with No. 17 Squadron. This involved escorting American Douglas SBD Dauntless dive bombers that were targeting Japanese positions on Bougainville Island. Flying south of Shortland Island, Newton led his section in attacking some Mitsubishi A6M Zero fighters that were harassing a lone Curtis P-40 Kittyhawk fighter. In the resulting engagement, Freeman damaged one Zero.

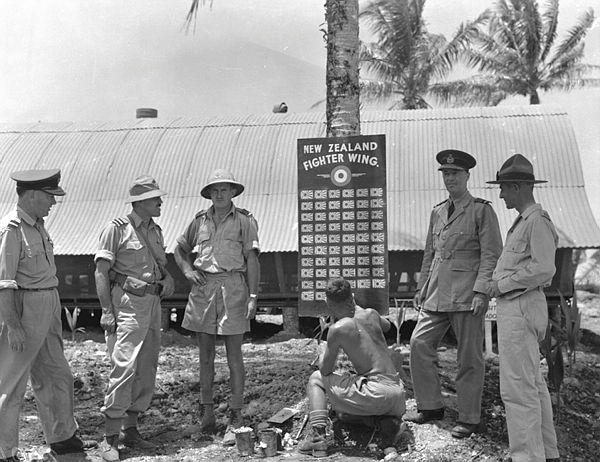
A group of officers beside the New Zealand Fighter Wing scoreboard at Ondonga, New Georgia; Freeman stands to the immediate left of the scoreboard

On 15 October Freeman was appointed commander of the newly established RNZAF station at Ondonga Airfield on the island of New Georgia in the Solomons. He also became commander of the RNZAF Fighter Wing, which comprised Nos. 15 and 18 Squadrons, both of which being based at Ondonga. Initially, operational control of the Fighter Wing rested with the United States Marine Corps, but the following month Freeman assumed responsibility for this, as well as the American 70th Fighter Squadron and Marine Fighter Squadron 17. The extent of his duties was such that on 8 December he relinquished command of the station.

By December, a foothold had been established at Empress Augusta Bay on Bougainville Island and airstrips constructed there. This brought the Japanese naval base at Rabaul within range of Allied fighters. On 17 December, 80 fighters sortied to Rabaul, with Freeman leading 24 Kittyhawks of the Fighter Wing. They staged to Torokina Airfield, one of the airstrips at Empress Augusta Bay, and then onto Rabaul. They were engaged by Japanese fighters, and in the ensuing combat, Freeman is believed to have shot down a Zero fighter. However his own aircraft may have been damaged in the engagement. Other pilots in his section saw him flying at low level, possibly making a crash landing, on New Ireland, but became distracted by the appearance of Japanese fighters and lost sight of Freeman. Despite an aerial search in the area he was last seen, no trace of him or his aircraft was found.

With no known grave, Freeman is commemorated on the Bourail Memorial at the Commonwealth War Graves Commission's Bourail New Zealand War Cemetery near Bourail in New Caledonia. At the time of his death, he held the rank of wing commander.
