= Douglas St George =

New Zealand aviator and military leader (1919–1985)

- Born: Douglas Fitzclarence St George; 7 September 1919; Nelson, New Zealand
- Died: 25 October 1985 (aged 66); Heretaunga, New Zealand
- Spouse: Minnie Darrow (m. 1953)
- Children: 2
- Military career
- Allegiance: New Zealand
- Branch: Royal New Zealand Air Force
- Service years: 1940–1974
- Rank: Air Vice-Marshal
- Commands: No. 17 Squadron; No. 14 Squadron; No. 75 Squadron; Flying Wing, Ohakea; RNZAF Ohakea; RNZAF Training Group; Chief of the Air Staff
- Conflicts: Second World War: Solomon Islands campaign
- Awards: Companion of the Order of the Bath; Commander of the Order of the British Empire; Distinguished Flying Cross; Air Force Cross

Douglas Fitzclarence St George CB, CBE, DFC, AFC (7 September 1919 – 25 October 1985) was a New Zealand aviator and military leader who served with the Royal New Zealand Air Force (RNZAF) during the Second World War and in the postwar period.

Born in Nelson, he joined the RNZAF in 1940 and became a fighter pilot in No. 17 Squadron. He flew operationally with the squadron during 1943 and 1944, including a period as its commander. He remained in the service after the war and in his later career, he held a series of staff postings, including an appointment as Deputy Chief of Air Staff in 1970. He became Chief of the Air Staff in 1971. Appointed a Companion of the Order of the Bath in January 1974, he retired as an air vice-marshal later the same year. He died in 1985, aged 66.

== Early life ==
Douglas Fitzclarence St George was born in Nelson, New Zealand, on 9 September 1919. He was educated at Auckland Grammar School before going onto Seddon Memorial Technical College.

== Second World War ==
St George enlisted in the Royal New Zealand Air Force (RNZAF) in February 1940. He was subsequently posted to No. 17 Squadron. This was formed at Ohakea in October 1942, training on North American Harvards before receiving Curtiss P-40 Kittyhawks. It moved to Espiritu Santo in July 1943 and then on to Kukum Field at Guadalcanal in mid-September to relieve No. 16 Squadron. On 23 September St George, now holding the rank of flight lieutenant, was flying as an escort to United States Navy Grumman Avenger TBFs on a sortie to Kahili on Bougainville Island, when he shared in the destruction of a Mitsubishi A6M Zero fighter. A second was credited to him as probably destroyed.

No. 17 Squadron's tour of operations ended in October 1943 and its flying personnel were repatriated back to New Zealand. It returned to the South West Pacific in December 1943. By this time, the New Zealand Fighter Wing, of which No. 17 Squadron was part, was engaged in fighter sweeps to Rabaul, where a significant Japanese presence remained, from Ondonga Airfield on New Georgia. On 24 December St George was involved in the Fighter Wing's most successful engagement of the war; above Rabaul, a total of twelve Japanese aircraft were destroyed with St George credited with the destruction of a Zero fighter. The squadron's tour of operations was curtailed due to its losses, both in combat operations and due to illness, and in late January 1944 it was repatriated to New Zealand for a rest.

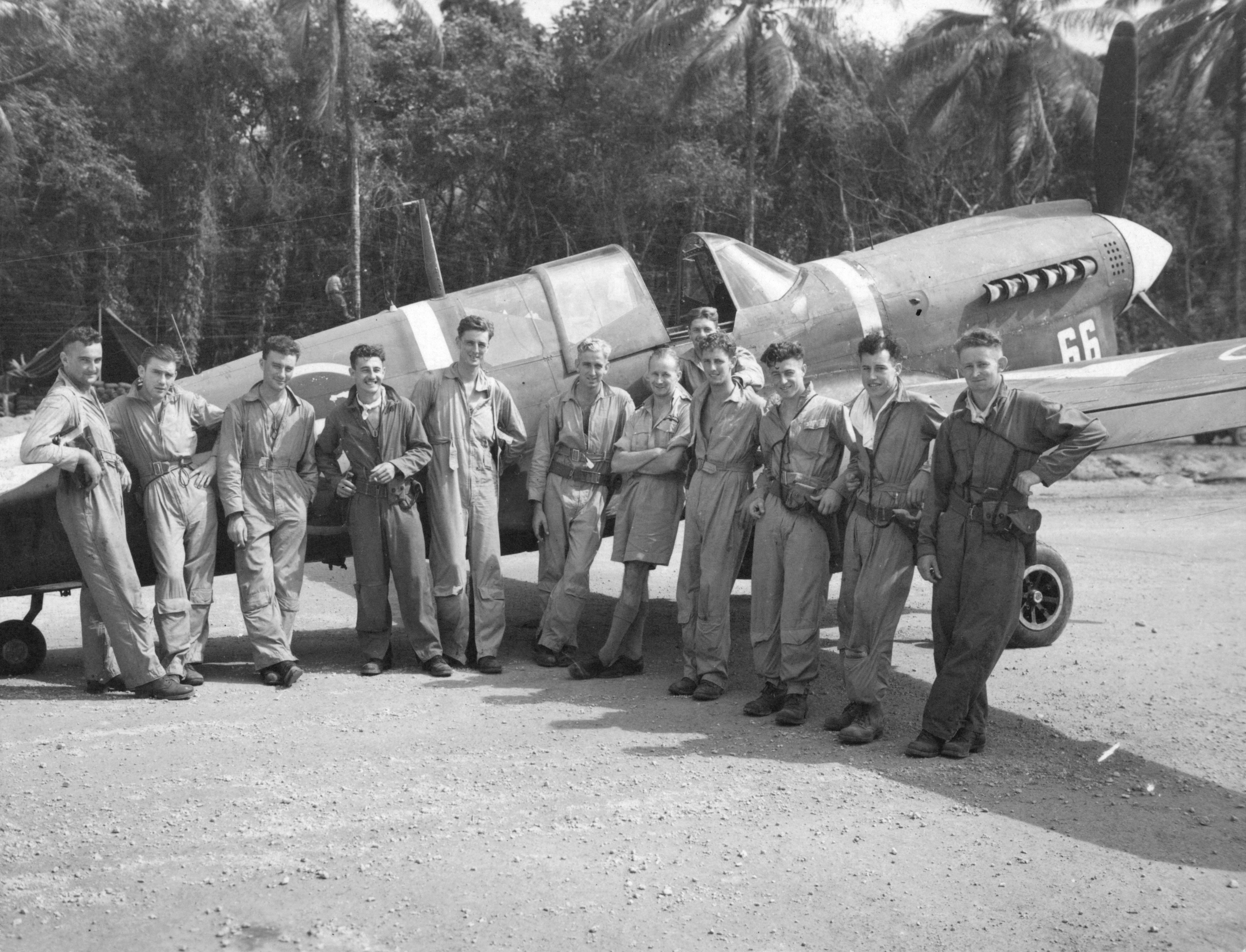
Pilots of No. 17 Squadron at Ondonga Airfield, December 1943

=== Squadron command ===
In April 1944 St George, promoted to squadron leader, was appointed commander of No. 17 Squadron. By this time, Japanese air activity had largely been suppressed and the unit, like the other RNZAF fighter squadrons in the area, was operating in a fighter-bomber role. After overseeing its conversion of the Vought F4U Corsair fighter, St George led the squadron back to Bougainville Island, where it served from April to June and again from September to November. He then relinquished command of the squadron and returned to New Zealand.

The following year he was appointed commander of the Fighter Leaders School at Ardmore. His service with No. 17 Squadron was recognised on 20 April 1945, with an award of the Distinguished Flying Cross (DFC); the announcement stated the DFC was "in recognition of gallantry and devotion to duty in the execution of air operations in the South-West Pacific Area."

== Post-war period ==
St George was granted a permanent commission in the RNZAF in December 1946. In April 1947 he succeeded Squadron Leader Jesse de Willimoff as commander of No. 14 Squadron, then on occupation duties at Hōfu in Japan. Much of its work at this time involved patrolling the coastline to catch Korean smugglers. He led the squadron through its remaining period of service in Japan, which ended in November 1948.

In June 1953, St George was commander of the RNZAF contingent sent to London for the Queen's Coronation Parade there, and he was awarded the Queen Elizabeth II Coronation Medal. Also in 1953, St George married Patrine Darrow, and the couple went on to have two sons.

Promoted to wing commander in 1954, St George was commander of No. 75 Squadron, equipped with the de Havilland Vampire jet fighter, from May to August 1954, before being appointed to lead the Flying Wing at Ohakea. In June 1956, he was sent on attachment to the Royal Australian Air Force (RAAF) for two years. In the 1957 New Year Honours he was awarded the Air Force Cross. This recognised his service in the various flying posts that he had occupied over the preceding years. With his attachment to the RAAF concluded, in 1958 he was promoted to group captain and appointed the commander of the RNZAF station at Ohakea.

St George, promoted to air commodore, was New Zealand's representative at the South East Asia Treaty Organisation in Bangkok from 1963 to 1965. During his time there, he went to South Vietnam to discuss the potential use of RNZAF personnel and equipment with American officials of the Military Assistance Command. Their preference was for pilots to fly transport and liaison aircraft since this would free up personnel of the South Vietnam Air Force for combat duties. In the event, RNZAF squadrons carried out regular supply flights from Singapore and New Zealand to South Vietnam but personnel only operated within the country itself on attachment to units of other Allied countries.

Returning to New Zealand in 1966, St George served as the commander of RNZAF's Training Group for two years before being appointed Air Member for Personnel on the Air Board in 1969. The following year, he served as the deputy to the Chief of the Air Staff (CAS), Air Vice-Marshal William Stratton.

=== Chief of the Air Staff ===
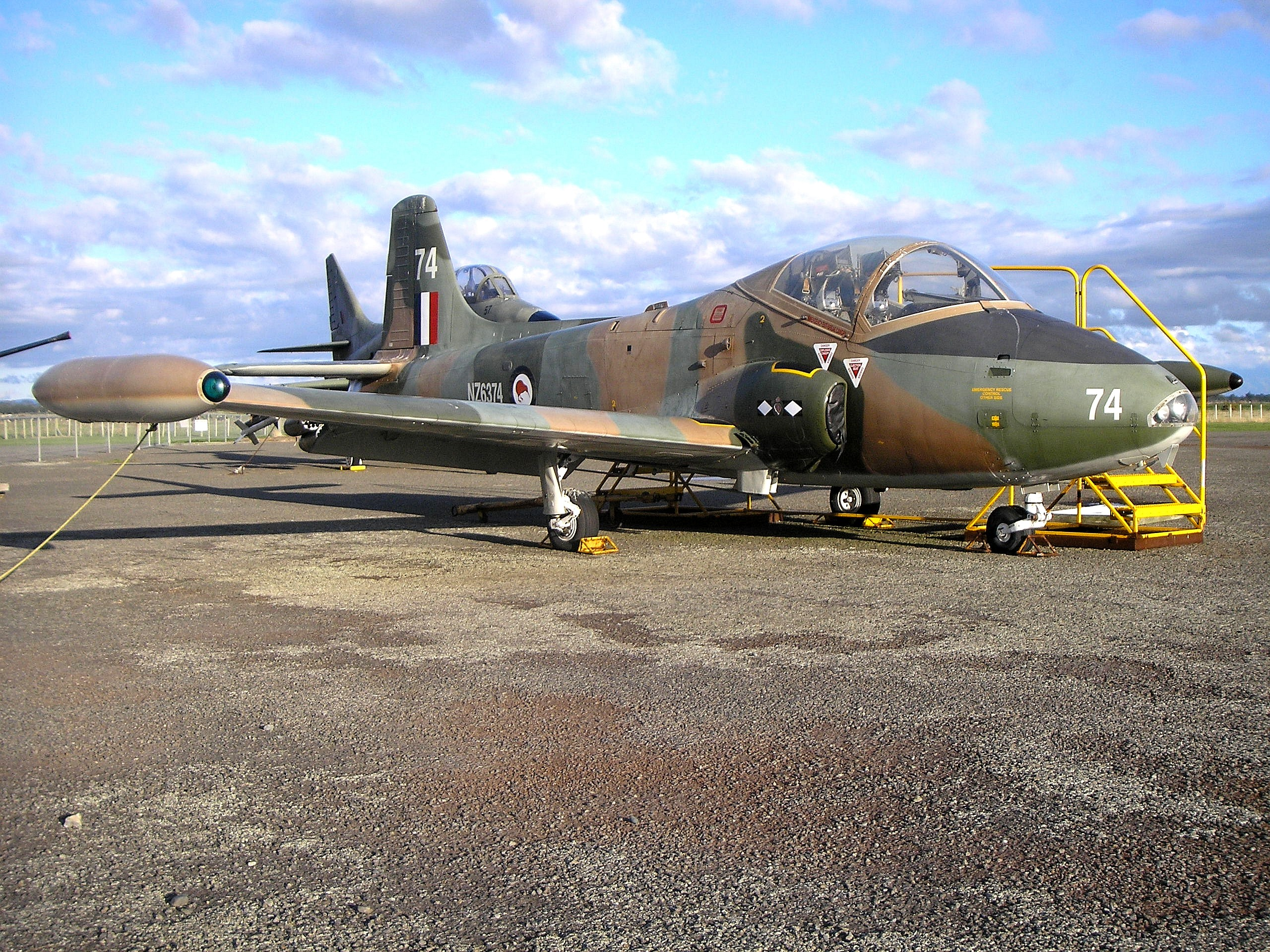
During St George's tenure as Chief of the Air Staff, the BAC Strikemaster entered service with the Royal New Zealand Air Force

In the Birthday Honours of 1971, St George was appointed a Commander of the Order of the British Empire. The next month, he was promoted to air vice-marshal and appointed CAS, replacing Stratton as the commander of the RNZAF. St George had to deal with limited financial resources but during his tenure, the BAC Strikemaster trainer entered service with the RNZAF and work on implementing into service of Pacific Aerospace Corporation's PAC CT/4 Airtrainer trainer commenced. His services as CAS was rewarded in the 1974 New Year Honours with an appointment as a Companion of the Order of the Bath. Succeeded by Richard Bolt, he retired from the RNZAF as an air-vice marshal the following September.

== Later life ==
In his retirement, St George was one of a number of former senior officers of the New Zealand military to protest the 1984 Labour Government's decision to make New Zealand nuclear-free, raising concern at the potential impact on the ANZUS Treaty. He died at Heretaunga, near Wellington, on 25 October 1985, at the age of 66. His wife, Patrine St George, died on 31 December 1994.

== Notes ==
Military offices
Preceded by William Stratton	Chief of the Air Staff (RNZAF); 1971–1974	Succeeded by Richard Bolt
