= Bill Hamilton (agricultural scientist) =

Agricultural scientist, scientific administrator (1909–1992)

William Maxwell Hamilton CBE (2 July 1909 – 14 August 1992) was a New Zealand agricultural scientist and scientific administrator. He joined the Department of Scientific and Industrial Research (DSIR) in 1936 and led the organisation from 1963 to 1971, turning it into an internationally recognised research institute during his career.

== Early life and education ==
Hamilton was born in Warkworth, New Zealand, on 2 July 1909. His parents were William Hamilton and Isabella Hamilton (née Wilson). We went to Warkworth School by dinghy across the Mahurangi River. His school became Warkworth District High School in 1923 (since renamed to Mahurangi College), when he was one of the initial 20 students. After he matriculated in 1927, he took over his ill father's farm. He went to Massey Agricultural College in 1930 for a course on dairy farm management after having built up a herd of Holstein Friesians. Having done well academically, he attended Auckland University College studying towards a medical degree but went back to Massey after a year, from where he graduated with a bachelor in agricultural science. He completed a masters of agricultural science and his thesis dealt with Little Barrier Island: Hauturu, or, Little Barrier : its history, geology and botany He later went back to Massey and completed a doctoral degree in 1943 about the domestic citrus industry.

== Career ==
Hamilton joined the Department of Scientific and Industrial Research (DSIR) in 1936 in the Plant Research Bureau. As part of his work, he undertook the research for his doctorate. He also went to Samoa to provide advice for growers of cocoa. He went to London in 1937 to temporarily replace New Zealand's science liaison officer but due to the WW2, he remained there until 1940. This period proved instrumental for the future of the DSIR due to the many contacts that he made in England.

Back in New Zealand, he helped develop the flax industry in support of the war effort and undertook economic research on the country's dairy industry. When Frank Callaghan, the CEO of the Plant Research Bureau, fell ill and went on long-term leave, he stood in for him. After the war, the DSIR was restructured and Hamilton took a leading role in shaping the organisation. He took on more responsibilities over time and provided managerial leadership. Together with Charles Watson-Munro, he developed a payment scheme for their scientists linked to their scientific output; this was adopted by the State Services Commission and later applied across most of the public sector. In 1953, Hamilton took on the leadership of the DSIR. Faced with significant budget cuts, he worked with the government on achieving a transparent accountability, with scientific research geared towards what was useful for industry and the country. He grew the DSIR to an internationally recognised organisation with strong scientific output, and maintained the trust and confidence of successive government ministers. Hamilton retired in 1971.

== Family and death ==
On 22 September 1945 at St Columba's Presbyterian Church in Warkworth, Hamilton married Alice Annie Morrison. She was a school teacher. They were to have two sons and one daughter. His daughter Lyn (married name Wade) first accompanied him to Little Barrier Island on one of his research trips in 1956. After his retirement, the Hamiltons returned to Warkworth. He died at his home on 14 August 1992, only six weeks after the DSIR had been disestablished.

== Honours, awards and commemoration ==
In 1953, Hamilton was awarded the Queen Elizabeth II Coronation Medal. In the 1970 Queen's Birthday Honours, he was appointed a Commander of the Order of the British Empire, for services as director-general of the Department of Scientific and Industrial Research. In 1971, Hamilton was conferred an honorary Doctor of Science degree by Massey University for his economic work on the dairy industry during the war.

Plant & Food Research, a Crown Research Institute, has a Hamilton building at its Mount Albert head office that is named after him. The Hamilton Track on Little Barrier Island is also named to commemorate him.

His daughter later chaired the Little Barrier Island (Hauturu) Supporters' Trust and was awarded a Queen's Service Medal in the 2018 Birthday Honours for her conservation work; mainly on Little Barrier Island.
