= The New Zealand Squadron =

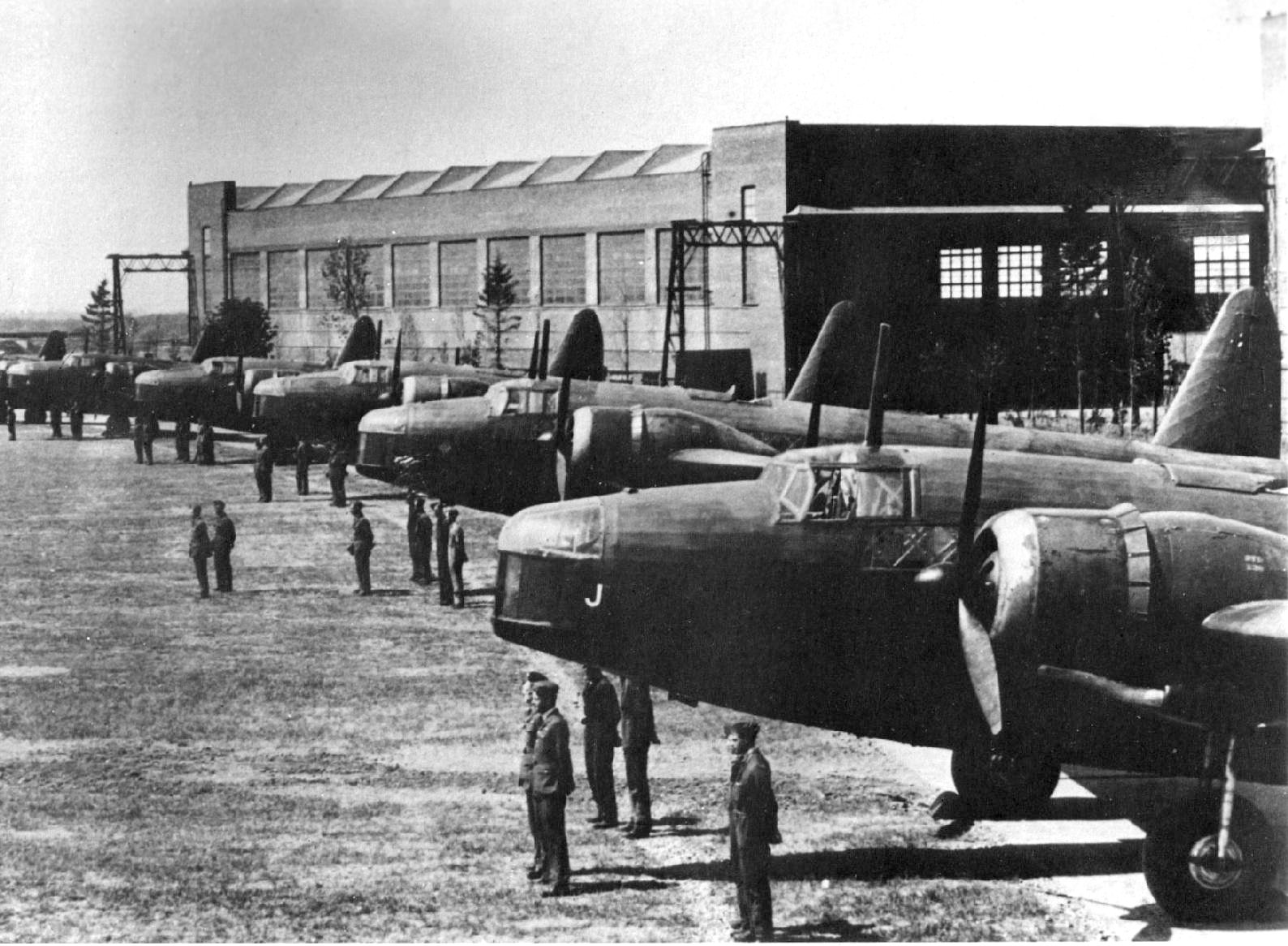
New Zealand crewed Wellington bombers at Stradishall on 10 July 1939

The New Zealand Squadron was the name given by the Royal Air Force to the men of the Royal New Zealand Air Force (RNZAF) in the United Kingdom to train on the 30 Vickers Wellington Mk IC bombers the New Zealand Government ordered in 1938 to introduce the latest in military aviation technology to the RNZAF. Some RNZAF aircrew had been sent to the United Kingdom and others already there were posted to the group training on the new aircraft based at RAF Marham in Norfolk commencing on 1 June 1939 under the command of Squadron Leader Maurice Buckley. The crews were to fly the aircraft to New Zealand in batches of six, to their new airbase, RNZAF Base Ohakea in the country's North Island, that was being built to receive them.

RAF official records name this group of airmen as "The New Zealand Squadron", and shared RAF Marham with No. 38 and No. 115 Squadrons. They moved to RAF Harwell, and then to RAF Feltwell on 12 February 1940. Those aircraft initially delivered and being used by the New Zealand crews had their RNZAF serial numbers painted under the wings, "NZ301" to "NZ305".

As a result of Britain declaring war against Germany, the New Zealand Government made the airmen and the aircraft – that had so far been delivered and those still on the production line – available to the RAF to help with the new war effort. Also called or known as The New Zealand Flight, they completed several operations of their own across to various European destinations. The New Zealand airmen were concerned that they would be split up and posted to existing RAF squadrons, however a decision by the Air Ministry to give them the defunct No. 75 Squadron numberplate on 4 April 1940, meant that the nucleus of The New Zealand Squadron personnel remained together but under the command of the RAF as No. 75 (NZ) Squadron.

== Bibliography ==
- Thompson, H. L. (1953). New Zealanders with the Royal Air Force. Official History of New Zealand in the Second World War 1939–45. Vol. I. Wellington: War History Branch. OCLC 270919916.
