= William Stratton (RNZAF officer) =

William Hector Stratton
- Born: 22 July 1916; Hastings, New Zealand
- Died: 27 December 2005 (aged 89); Perth, Australia
- Military career
- Allegiance: New Zealand
- Branch: Royal Air Force; Royal New Zealand Air Force
- Service years: 1937–44 (RAF); 1944–1971 (RNZAF)
- Rank: Air Vice Marshal
- Nickname: Stratters
- Commands: Chief of Air Staff (1969–71); No. 213 Squadron RAF; No. 134 Squadron RAF
- Conflicts: Second World War; Battle of France; North African campaign; Burma campaign
- Awards: Companion of the Order of the Bath; Commander of the Order of the British Empire; Distinguished Flying Cross & Bar; Mention in Despatches

Air Vice Marshal William Hector Stratton, CB, CBE, DFC & Bar (22 July 1916 – 27 December 2005) was a New Zealand aviator and military leader during the Second World War and the postwar period.

Born in Hastings, he joined the Royal Air Force in 1937 and served as a fighter pilot in the Second World War, initially with No. 1 Squadron during the Battle of France. He later performed instructing duties in Rhodesia until given command of No. 134 Squadron in June 1943. He transferred to the Royal New Zealand Air Force in 1944 and remained in the service after the war. In his later career, he held a series of staff postings, including an appointment as Assistant Chief of Air Staff in 1961. He became Chief of Air Staff in 1969. Appointed a Companion of the Order of the Bath in 1970, he retired the following year. He died in 2005, aged 89.

== Early life ==
Born on 22 July 1916 in Hastings in New Zealand, William Hector Stratton was interested in flying from an early age. In 1935 he gained his pilot's licence from the Western Federated Flying Club in Hāwera. After a period of farming, in 1937 he entered the Royal Air Force (RAF) on a short service commission. Nicknamed 'Stratters', on completion of his training in May 1939, he was posted to No. 1 Squadron. Based at Tangmere, his new unit was a fighter squadron which was equipped with the Hawker Hurricane.

== Second World War ==
As tensions escalated between Britain and Germany, No. 1 Squadron was mobilised for war and shortly after the declaration of hostilities on 3 September 1939, it went to Octeville in France as part of the Air Component of the British Expeditionary Force (BEF). It began flying offensively between the borders of France and Germany in October, occasionally engaging with the Luftwaffe. Stratton was promoted to flying officer in February 1940. On 29 March, he shared in the destruction of a Messerschmitt Bf 110 heavy fighter when the section that he was part of encountered nine of the German aircraft to the northeast of Metz. This was the first Bf 110 to be destroyed by pilots of the RAF and he and the other pilots of his section were rewarded with a dinner at Maxim's in Paris.

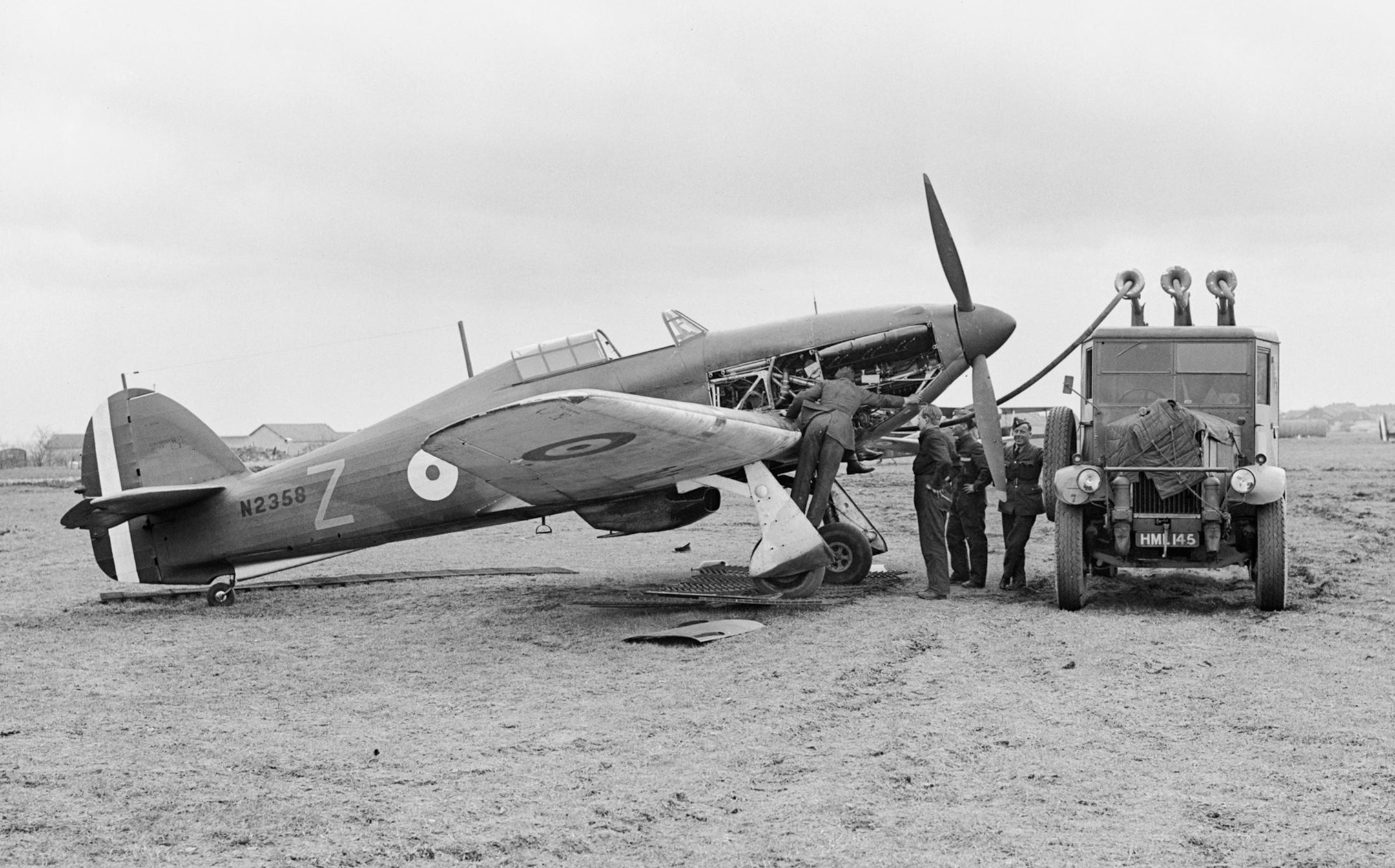
A Hawker Hurricane of No. 1 Squadron being refuelled at Vassincourt

On 10 May 1940, the German forces launched their blitzkrieg through the Low Countries and France. The fighter squadrons attached to the BEF immediately mounted a defence despite their scarce numbers relative to the Luftwaffe. On 14 May Stratton shot down a Junkers Ju 87 dive bomber, followed a day later by a Bf 110. He damaged a Heinkel He 111 medium bomber on 19 May. Despite its best efforts, the squadron had to abandon base after base as it was forced to withdraw, and by late June was back in the United Kingdom, at Northolt. Stratton was subsequently awarded the Distinguished Flying Cross (DFC) for his service during the Battle of France. The citation noted that he had shot down five aircraft, although only the details of three of these are known.

Stratton did not participate in the Battle of Britain, being instead posted to Rhodesia as an instructor under the Empire Air Training Scheme. This work was to occupy him for the next three years. In February 1941, he was promoted to flight lieutenant. The following year, in March, he was promoted to squadron leader. In June 1943 Stratton returned to operations as commander of No. 134 Squadron, which operated Supermarine Spitfires and was stationed in the Middle East as part of the Desert Air Force. Flying mostly convoy patrols and interception missions, it rarely encountered Axis aircraft. Following the collapse of Fascist Italy, the squadron participated in operations against the Germans stationed on Crete. At the end of the year, the squadron was transferred to India to strengthen the RAF presence there. Now using the Hurricane fighter, they carried out strafing and bombing attacks on the Japanese positions and communication infrastructure.

Stratton relinquished command of No. 134 Squadron in May 1944, shortly before it was taken off operations to begin converting to the Republic P-47 Thunderbolt, and returned to New Zealand. In recognition of his "gallantry in flying operations" while in the Middle East and in India, he was awarded a bar to his DFC, the citation noting that he had destroyed four enemy aircraft. He was mentioned in despatches the following month for his services as commander of the squadron. Stratton's short service commission in the RAF had ended at the start of the year and by this time he had formally transferred to the Royal New Zealand Air Force (RNZAF).

Stratton was credited with at least three German aircraft destroyed, with one damaged. According to aviation historians Christopher Shores and Clive Williams, in some sources he is credited with nine aerial victories. However, Shores and Williams believe this to be in error, possibly arising out of a handwritten 4 being interpreted as a 9.

== Postwar service ==
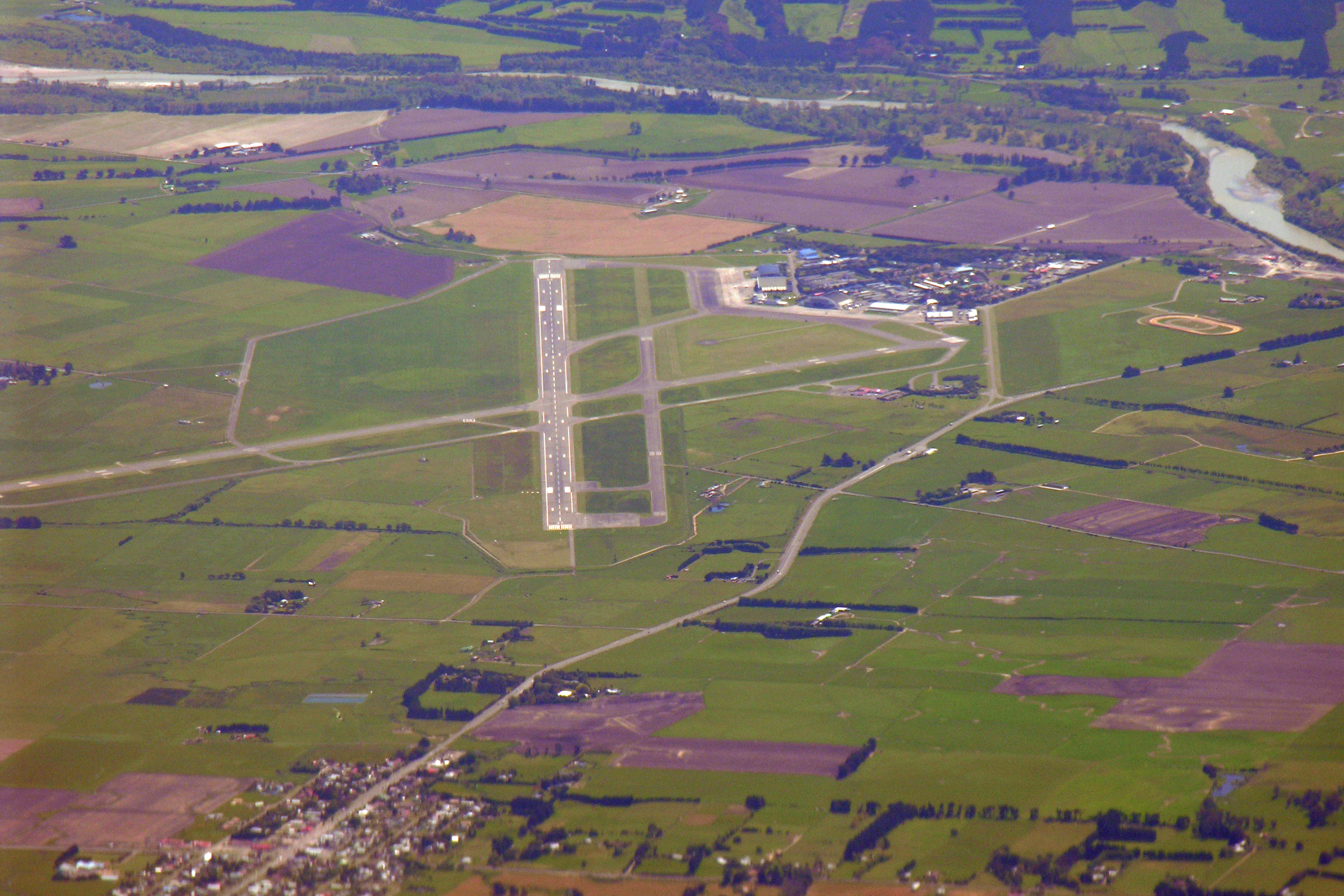
Ohakea Air Base, which Stratton commanded in 1948

In the initial postwar period, Stratton was commander of the Flying Training Wing at the RNZAF Wigram Air Base before being posted in 1947 to the operations staff of British Commonwealth Air Forces as part of the occupation force in Japan. On his return to New Zealand in 1948 he was appointed commander of the Ohakea Air Base. He spent three years in Australia as the head of the New Zealand joint services liaison staff before taking up a post as Group Captain, Operations at the headquarters of the RNZAF in Wellington.

Appointed Assistant Chief of the Air Staff in 1961, the following year Stratton led an evaluation team to the United States to assess aircraft suitable for replacing the obsolete Short Sunderland flying boats that served the RNZAF in a maritime reconnaissance role. He concluded that the Lockheed P-3 Orion anti-submarine aircraft was the best for the task and these were duly purchased after he persuaded his superior, Air Vice Marshal Ian Morrison, of the type's merits.

In the 1963 Birthday Honours, Stratton was appointed Commander of the Order of the British Empire. In January 1964 he took up a three-year posting in the United Kingdom as Air Officer Commanding, RNZAF Headquarters in London. Now holding the rank of air commodore, he then served as the Air Member for Personnel on the Air Board, the controlling body of the RNZAF. In July 1969 he was appointed Chief of Air Staff (CAS). During his tenure as CAS, a fleet of Douglas A-4 Skyhawks entered service with the RNZAF, improving its offensive capabilities. In the 1970 Birthday Honours, he was appointed Companion of the Order of the Bath. He formally retired from the RNZAF on 1 November 1971 as an air vice marshal, his term as CAS having ended a few months prior.

== Later life ==
Stratton died in Perth, Australia, on 27 December 2005. Survived by his wife, he was cremated and his remains buried at Karrakatta Cemetery in Perth.

== Notes ==
Military offices
Preceded by Cameron Turner	Chief of the Air Staff (RNZAF); 1969–1971	Succeeded by Douglas St George
