= Guy Newton (RNZAF officer) =

New Zealander flying ace

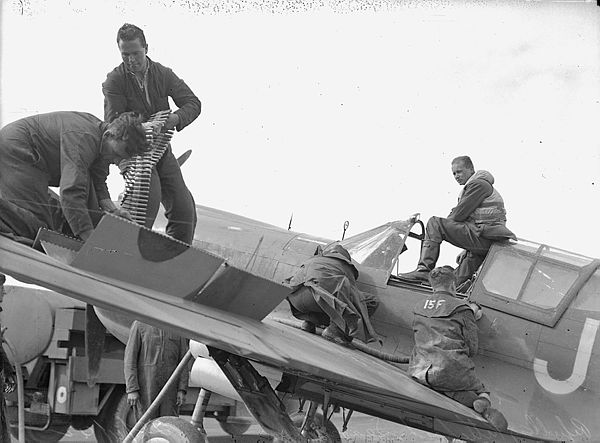
- Newton in his Kittyhawk, which is being rearmed, November 1942
- Born: 27 September 1917; Christchurch, New Zealand
- Died: 24 July 2018 (aged 100); Melbourne, Australia
- Military career
- Allegiance: New Zealand
- Branch: Royal New Zealand Air Force
- Service years: 1939–1946
- Rank: Wing Commander
- Commands: No. 17 Squadron
- Conflicts: Second World War; Guadalcanal campaign; New Georgia campaign
- Awards: Distinguished Flying Cross; Mention in Despatches
- Other work: Businessman

Percival Guy Haig Newton, DFC (29 September 1917 – 24 July 2018) was a flying ace of the Royal New Zealand Air Force (RNZAF) during the Second World War. He was credited with the destruction of at least five enemy aircraft.

Born in Christchurch, Newton joined the Royal Air Force in 1939 but did his flying training in New Zealand with the RNZAF. By the time his training was complete, the Second World War had started and he transferred to the RNZAF. He spent several months on instructing duties before being posted to No. 17 Squadron as a flight commander. In July 1943 he became commanding officer of the squadron and served in the South West Pacific theatre for several months before returning to New Zealand. He spent the rest of the war on staff duties, and was promoted to wing commander in 1945. On returning to civilian life, he worked in the engineering industry and later joined General Motors New Zealand. He subsequently held senior roles with subsidiaries of General Motors before retiring to Melbourne, Australia, in 1980. He died there in 2018, aged 100.

== Early life ==
Percival Guy Haig Newton, known as Guy, was born in Christchurch, New Zealand, on 29 September 1917, one of seven children of Arthur and Margaret Newton. He was educated at Rangiora High School and went on to study at Christ's College in Christchurch for his final year of secondary school. He worked as an engineering draughtsman for the Christchurch branch of the Department of Public Works while attending night school at the University of Canterbury. Keenly interested in flying, he enlisted in the Civil Reserve of Pilots in 1937.

Subsequently, Newton applied for a short service commission in the Royal Air Force (RAF). His application was accepted and, in April 1939, he began his flight training with the Royal New Zealand Air Force (RNZAF). He trained at Wigram Aerodrome and received a temporary commission as a pilot officer in June.

== Second World War ==
Following the outbreak of the Second World War, Newton was transferred to the RNZAF on a short-service commission instead of proceeding to the United Kingdom to serve with the RAF. Initially retained on the staff at the RNZAF base at Wigram, he was subsequently posted to No. 2 Intermediate Flying Training School after training as an instructor in early 1940 and having been confirmed in the rank of pilot officer. He was promoted to flying officer in January 1941.

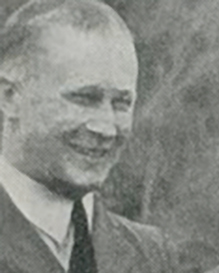
Newton in 1941

A Fighter Operational Training Unit (OTU) was formed at Okahea in March 1942 and Newton was sent there as an instructor. The OTU was equipped with North American Harvard trainer aircraft when established but these were supplemented with P-40 Kittyhawk fighters when they became available to the RNZAF from May. The month after his arrival at the OTU he was promoted to flight lieutenant. In August, he married Majorie Hutton, a clerk in the Royal New Zealand Navy, at the Wellington Cathedral of St Paul.

In October 1942, No. 17 Squadron was formed at Ohakea and Newton was appointed one of its flight commanders. Equipped with Kittyhawks, the squadron trained in New Zealand for several months until, in July 1943, it deployed to the South West Pacific, initially based at Espiritu Santo.

=== Service in South West Pacific ===
By this time Newton was commanding officer of No. 17 Squadron, having been promoted to squadron leader. At Santo, the squadron took over the defence duties for the region from another RNZAF unit, No. 14 Squadron. In mid-September, No. 17 Squadron deployed to Guadalcanal to relieve No. 16 Squadron, which returned to New Zealand for rest. Arriving on Guadalcanal on 11 September, No. 17 Squadron was to be engaged in operations supporting the United States and New Zealand ground forces in the region. It also carried out bomber-escort missions and patrols over Allied shipping. On his first sortie from Guadalcanal, on 12 September, the engine of Newton's Kittyhawk caught fire and he had to bail out. Landing near Wana Wana Island, he was picked up by natives in a canoe and was able to return to the squadron the next day.

On 11 October 1943, flying south of Shortland Island while escorting American Douglas SBD Dauntless dive bombers that had attacked targets on Bougainville Island, Newton led his section in attacking some Mitsubishi A6M Zero fighters that were harassing a lone Kittyhawk. In the resulting engagement, he destroyed one Zero, which was observed crashing into the sea by Wing Commander Trevor Freeman who was flying as Newton's wingman. No. 17 Squadron left its area of operations on 20 October to return to New Zealand. This ended Newton's first tour of operations, for which he was mentioned in despatches.

No. 17 Squadron returned to Santo in November 1943 and then moved forward to Ondonga on New Georgia. It began to be involved in operations against Rabaul as part of the New Zealand Fighter Wing. On 24 December, a large attack was mounted on Rabaul and No. 17 Squadron, along with No. 16 Squadron, was tasked with carrying out a sweep as a precursor to a bombing attack. It would prove to be the most successful day, in terms of enemy aircraft shot down, in the history of the RNZAF. Newton destroyed two Zeroes and claimed another as probably destroyed. Other aircraft of his squadron shot down seven more Japanese aircraft during the operation; those of No. 16 Squadron shot down three. While No. 17 Squadron was escorting Dauntless bombers attacking Tobera Airfield on 9 January, Newton destroyed two Zeroes.

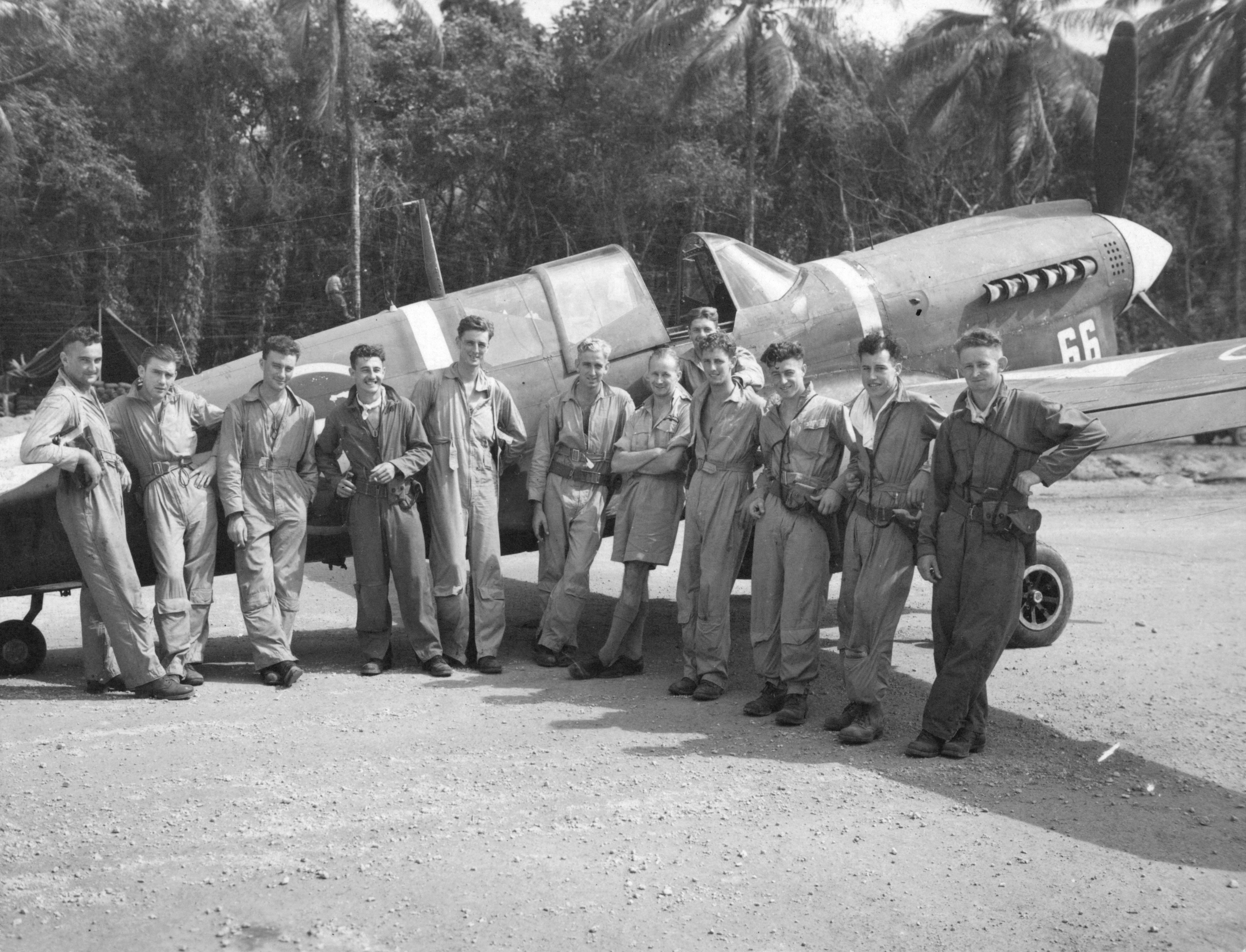
No. 17 Squadron RNZAF pilots at Ondonga on New Georgia, December 1943; Newton stands fifth from the right, in shorts

=== Later war service ===
No. 17 Squadron's second tour of operations completed prematurely at the end of January, owing to several casualties and a high sickness rate among its personnel. Newton was posted back to New Zealand to serve in the Directorate of Operations at the Air Department in Wellington. He was awarded the Distinguished Flying Cross in April 1944 "in recognition of gallantry displayed in flying operations against the enemy in the South West Pacific area". In April 1945, he was promoted to wing commander. He became the RNZAF's Director of Operations in August but the war ended shortly afterwards. He was credited with five Japanese aircraft shot down and another probably destroyed. He and Geoffrey Fisken, who also destroyed five Japanese aircraft, were the most successful fighter pilots of the RNZAF in the Southwest Pacific area of operations.

== Later life ==
Newton's service in the RNZAF ceased in April 1946 and he went on to the Reserve of Pilots, where he remained until December 1950. In the meantime, he returned to the engineering profession, working in Christchurch. In 1952, he began to work for General Motors New Zealand, becoming chief engineer for the company three years later. He relocated to Melbourne in Australia in 1957, and rose to become general manager of the Frigidaire Division in 1963. A few years later he moved again, this time to London as managing director of GM Limited. He also held senior positions with Vauxhall Motors and the German company Adam Opel AG and was later president of GM France. At the time, he was the most senior non-American in the company.

Newton retired in 1980, settling back in Melbourne. He died on 24 July 2018, survived by his three children. His wife had predeceased him in 1998.
