= 1970 Birthday Honours (New Zealand) =

Awards list for New Zealand

The 1970 Queen's Birthday Honours in New Zealand, celebrating the official birthday of Elizabeth II, were appointments made by the Queen on the advice of the New Zealand government to various orders and honours to reward and highlight good works by New Zealanders. They were announced on 13 June 1970.

The recipients of honours are displayed here as they were styled before their new honour.

== Knight Bachelor ==
- The Honourable Roy Emile Jack. For outstanding services as Speaker of the House of Representatives.
- Dove Myer Robinson. For outstanding services as mayor of Auckland from 1959 to 1965 and again from 1968.
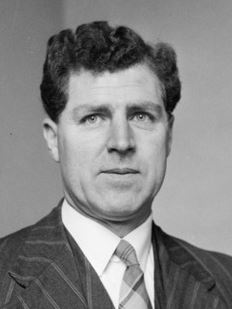
Sir Roy Jack

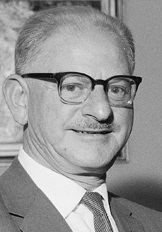
Sir Dove Myer Robinson

== Order of the Bath ==
=== Companion (CB) ===
Military division

- Air Vice-Marshal William Hector Stratton CBE DFC – Royal New Zealand Air Force.

== Order of Saint Michael and Saint George ==
=== Knight Grand Cross (GCMG) ===
- The Right Honourable Keith Jacka Holyoake CH – Prime Minister.
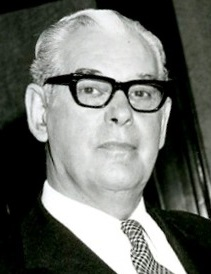
Sir Keith Holyoake

=== Companion (CMG) ===
- Samuel Lawrence Ludbrook MB ChB – of Auckland. For most valuable services to paediatrics and child health.
- The Honourable John Kenneth McAlpine – of Christchurch. For most valuable services to politics.
- The Honourable Arnold Henry Nordmeyer – of Wellington. For most valuable services to politics.
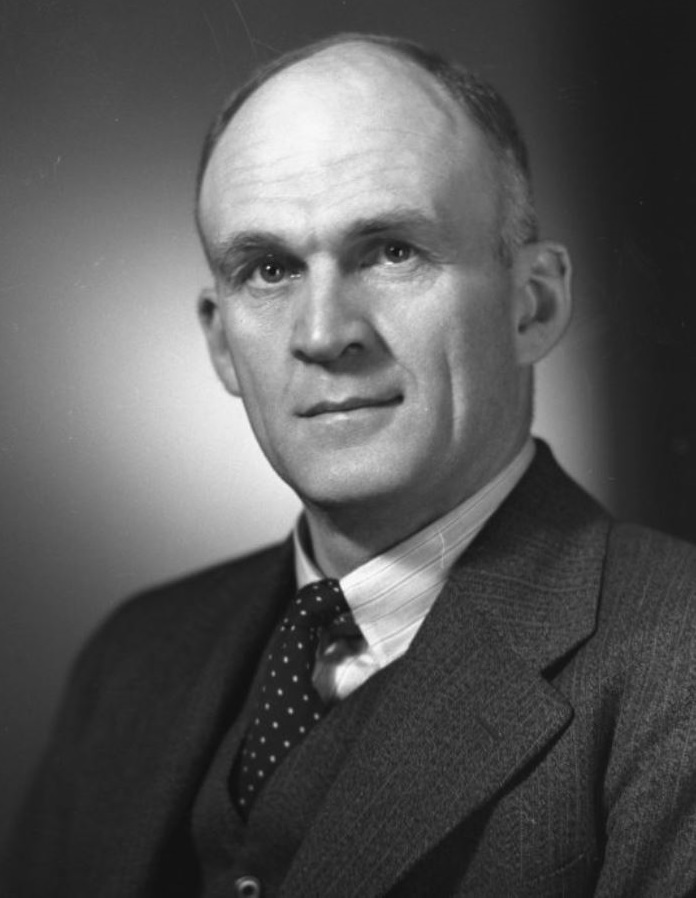
John McAlpine

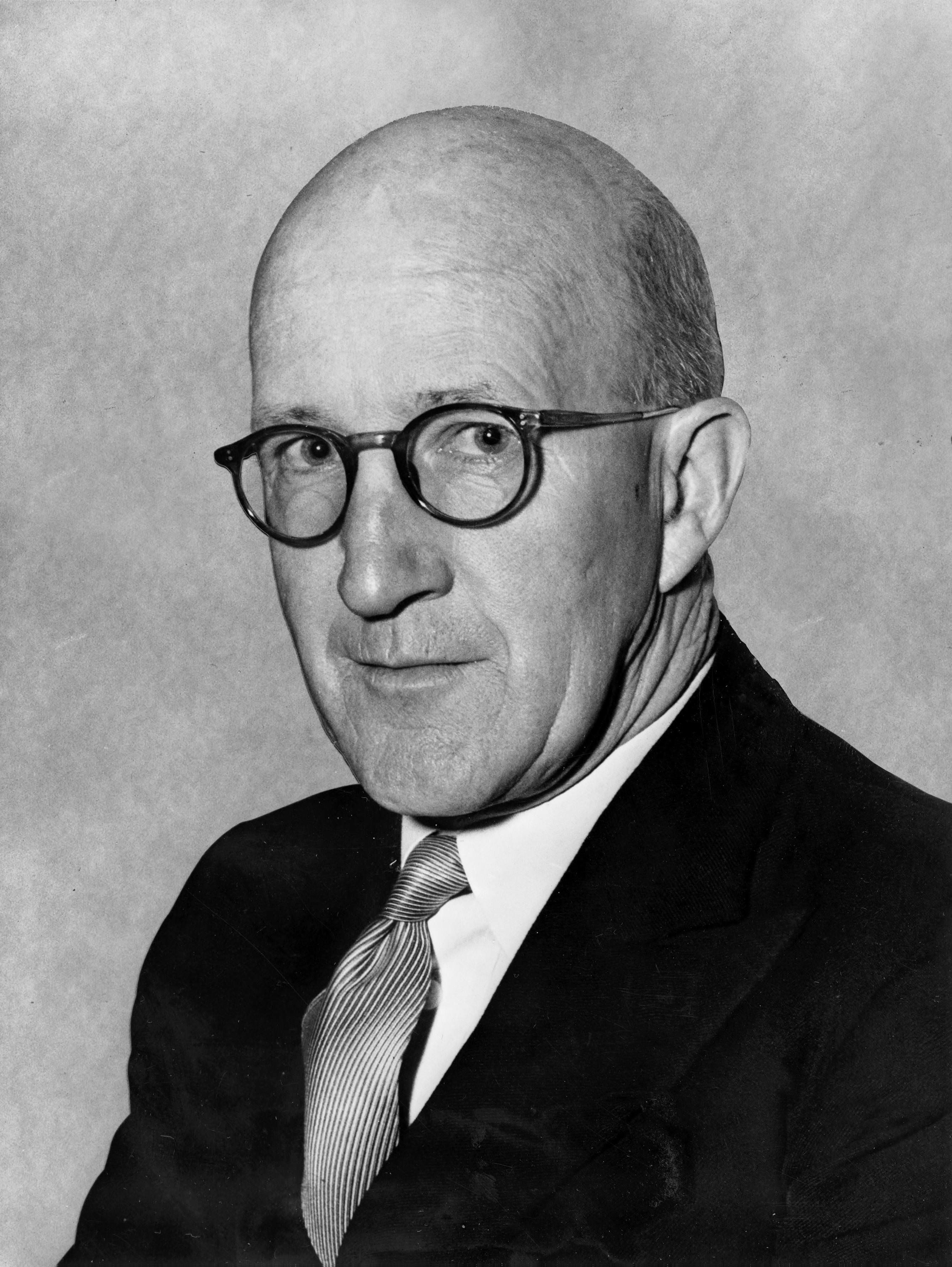
Arnold Nordmeyer

== Order of the British Empire ==
=== Knight Commander (KBE) ===
Civil division

- Alan John Danks. For outstanding services as chairman of the University Grants Committee.

=== Commander (CBE) ===
Civil division

- William Patteson Pollock Gordon MB FRCS – of Stratford. For very valuable services to medicine.
- Bernard David Arthur Greig – of Wellington. For very valuable services as Controller and Auditor-General.
- William Maxwell Hamilton – of Wellington. For very valuable services as director-general of the Department of Scientific and Industrial Research.
- Geoffrey John Jeune – of Wellington. For very valuable services as chief judge of the Māori Land Court.

Military division

- Major-General Richard James Holden Webb MBE – Chief of General Staff.

=== Officer (OBE) ===
Civil division

- Horace Ernest Carter. For valuable service to the community of Tauranga, especially as chairman of the Tauranga Harbour Board.
- Neill Thomas Gillespie – of Lower Hutt. For valuable services to local and national bodies.
- John Parry James – of Hamilton. For valuable services in the field of veterinary research.
- Brian James Lochore – of Eketāhuna. For valuable services to the sport of rugby football.
- Allan Joseph McDonald JP – of Wellington. For valuable services as secretary, New Zealand Labour Party.
- Eric Percy Salmon JP – of Auckland. For valuable services to the community and the printing industry.
- David Thomas Spring JP – of Palmerston North. For valuable services to the community, particularly education.
- Andrew Shirlaw Murray JP – of Cheviot. For valuable services to education.
- Hanara Tangiawha (Arnold) Reedy – of Ruatoria. For valuable services to the Māori people.
- Neil Lachlan Watson – of Invercargill. For valuable services to local government.
- James Busby Williams – of Gisborne. For valuable services to the community, particularly in local-body affairs.
- Ralph Frederick Wilson – of Wellington. For valuable services as general director of the New Zealand National Party.
- Herbert Jenner Wily JP – of Auckland. For valuable services as a magistrate.

Military division

- Commander Peter Ronald Silk – Royal New Zealand Navy.
- Colonel Robertson Harvey Smith – Colonels' List (Regular Force).
- Group Captain Bertram Collin Thomas Fitzgerald MBE – Royal New Zealand Air Force.
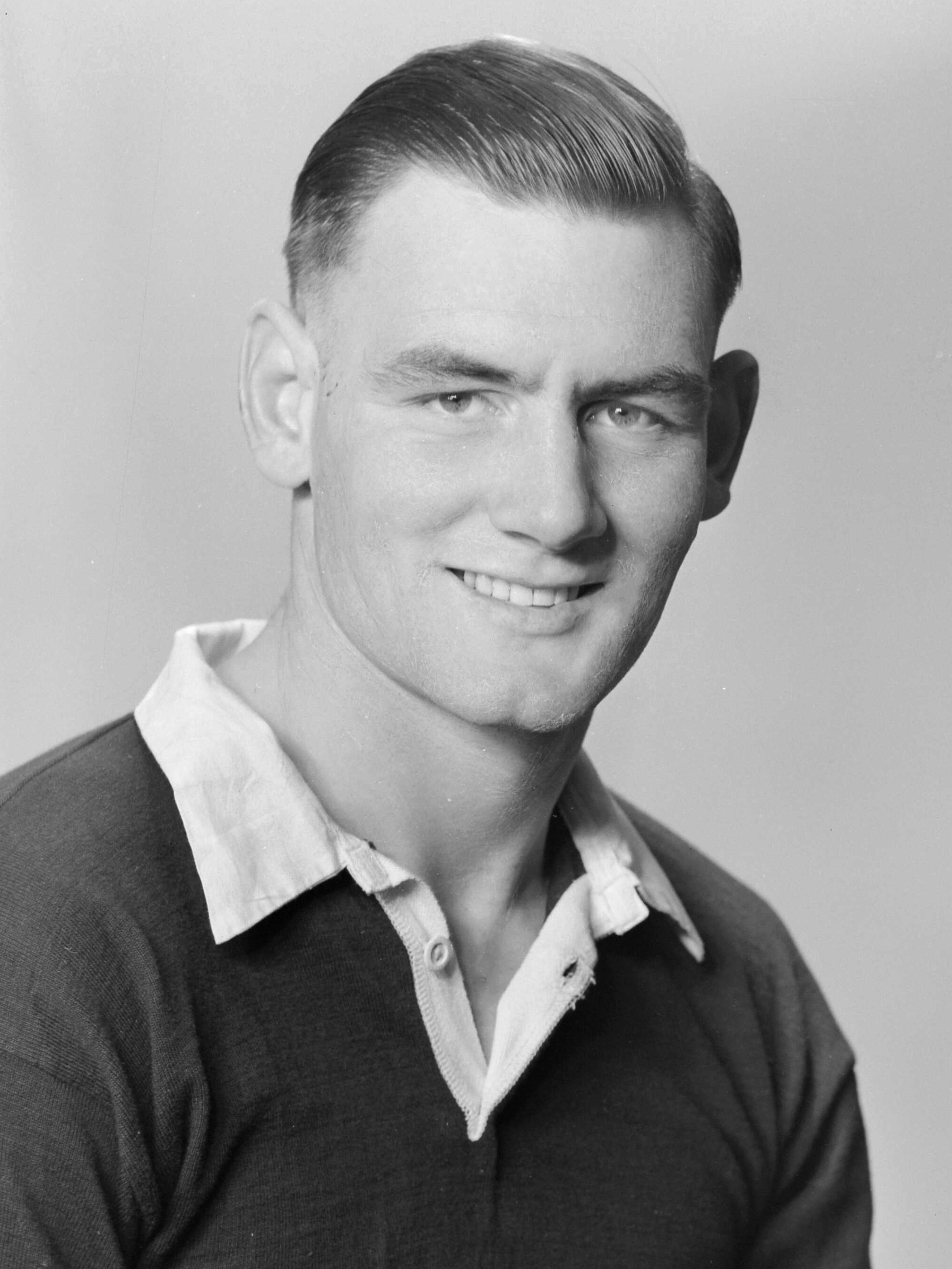
Brian Lochore

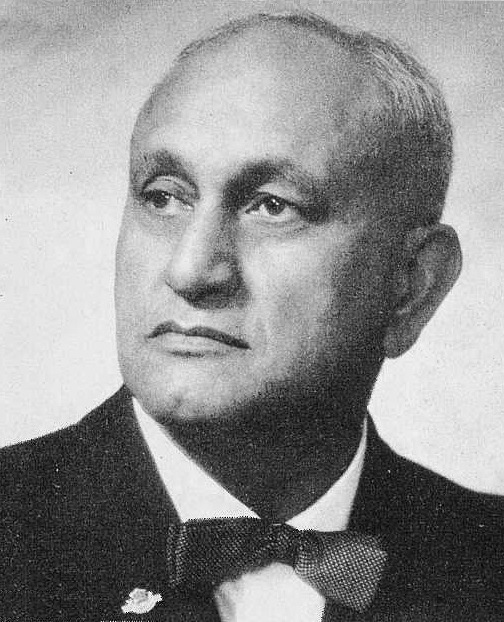
Arnold Reedy

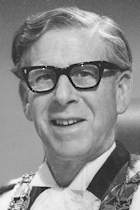
Neil Watson

=== Member (MBE) ===
Civil division

- Victor James Alexander – of Hamilton. For services to the community.
- Laura Catherine Ambury – of Dargaville. For services to the community.
- George John Wedgwood Boon – of Stratford. For services to local-body affairs as mayor of Stratford since 1957.
- Helen Campbell – of Christchurch. For services to the nursing profession.
- William Arthur Gordon Craddock JP – of Westport. For services to the community, particularly in the field of sports administration.
- The Reverend Murray Holman Feist – of Auckland. For services as secretary for New Zealand of the Mission to Lepers.
- Richard Noel Fickling JP – of Auckland. For services to local government and to sport.
- Betty Phyllis Hanson JP – of Auckland. For services to education administration.
- The Reverend Kingi Matutaera Ihaka – of Auckland. For services to the Anglican Māori Church.
- Patrick Kearins – of Taihape. For services to local affairs.
- Mary Timpany (Sister Mary Louise) – of Dunedin. For services to the education of deaf children.
- Walter James Ganley Parker – of Dannevirke. For services to the Boy Scout movement.
- Henry Trevor Parry JP – of Auckland. For services to the community.
- David Holt Rawson JP – of New Plymouth. For services to the community, especially in the field of mountain search and rescue.
- Arthur Henry Richards JP – of Napier. For services to the community, particularly to the welfare of the aged.
- Arthur Laurence Richardson JP – of Tāneatua. For services in local government.
- Robert Thomas Scott JP – of Morrinsville. For services to local-body affairs.
- Maora Tamihana – of Wellington. For services to Māori welfare.
- Herbert Henry Thomason MM JP – of Motueka. For services to local-body affairs.
- Donald Alexander Thompson – of Masterton. For services to the community, particularly to cultural organisations.
- Arthur William Thomson – of Balclutha. For services to the community.

Military division

- Lieutenant Commander Reginald Samuel Hurden – Royal New Zealand Navy.
- Major James Richard Millton Barker – Royal New Zealand Infantry Regiment (Regular Force).
- Major Fancis Edward Hopkinson – Royal Regiment of New Zealand Artillery (Territorial Force).
- Warrant Officer First Class Graeme Joseph Brighouse – Royal New Zealand Infantry Regiment (Regular Force).
- Warrant Officer First Class Andrew Gilmour McNearnie – Royal New Zealand Infantry Regiment (Regular Force).
- Squadron Leader James William Crook – Royal New Zealand Air Force.
- Squadron Leader William Ross Donaldson – Royal New Zealand Air Force.
- Warrant Officer Walter Thomas Ryde – Royal New Zealand Air Force.
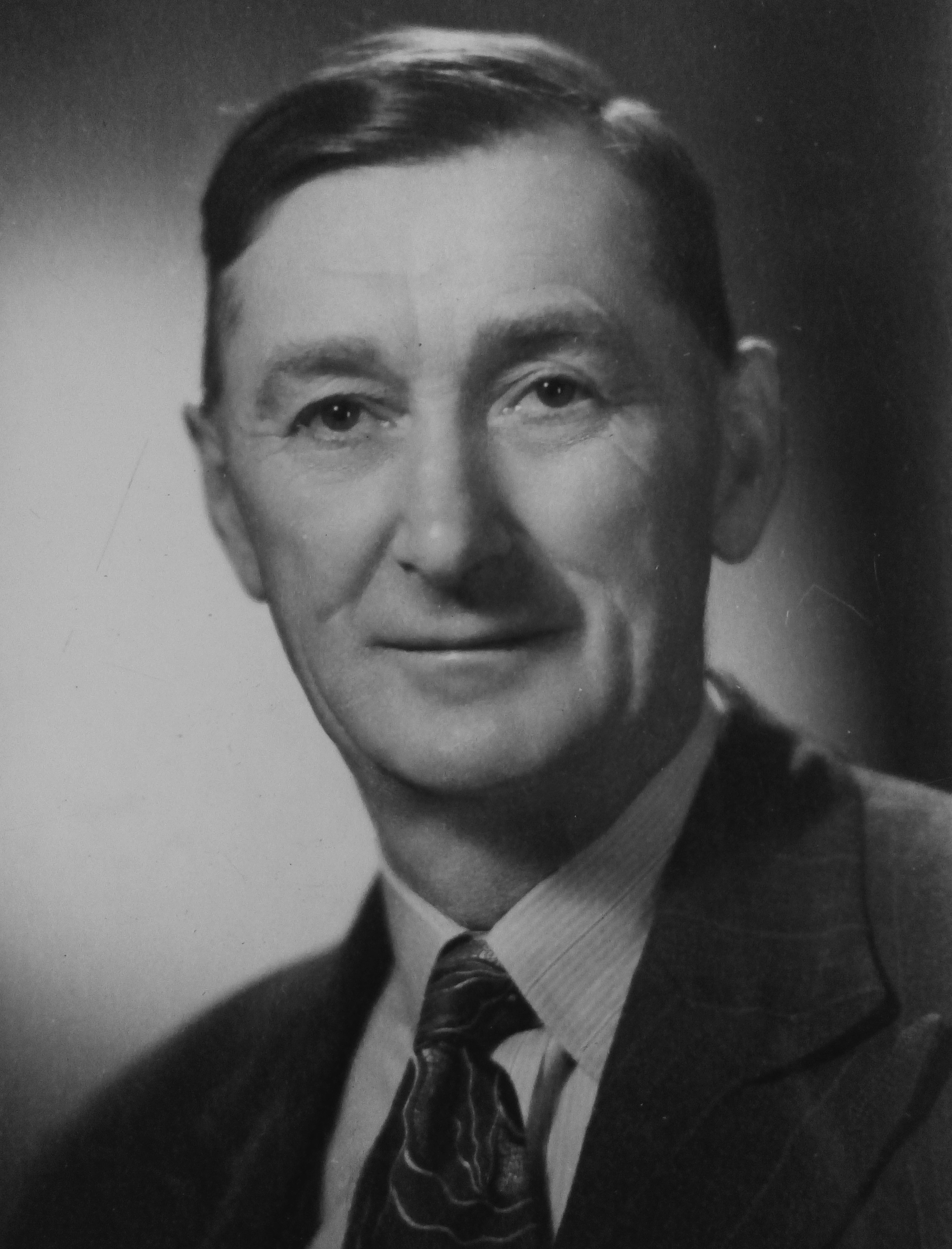
Paddy Kearins

== Companion of the Imperial Service Order (ISO) ==
- Philip Arthur Barnes JP – of Wellington. For valuable services as ministerial secretary.

== British Empire Medal (BEM) ==
Civil division

- Eric Raymond Clark – of Taumarunui. For services to the community and interest in the education of the Māori people.
- Hilda Frame – of Lyttelton. For services to the community.
- Richard Geoffrey Groves – of Ōpōtiki. For services as a sports coach.
- Frederick Arthur Halldane – of Christchurch. For services in voluntary defence training.
- Susannah Hoggard – of Paraparaumu. For services to the community.
- Frederick Livingstone Irving – of Nelson. For services to psychiatric nursing.
- William Arthur Lindsay. For services as manager of the Waitangi National Trust at Paihia since 1951.
- Private Leslie William Louisson JP – of New Plymouth. For services to the blind.
- Harold Allan Ben Pattenden – of Hamilton. For services as a foreman fitter with the New Zealand Electricity Department since 1944.
- Walter William Soal – of Ashburton. For services as a member of the St John Ambulance Brigade since 1940.
- Dorothy Steel JP – of Dunedin. For services to CORSO.
- Floyd Davis West – of Hokitika. For services as a line overseer, New Zealand Electricity Department.

Military division

- Chief Marine Engineering Mechanician Arthur James Thomas Curry – Royal New Zealand Navy.
- Chief Petty Officer Bryan Thomas Barlow – Royal New Zealand Volunteer Reserve.
- Chief Petty Officer Arthur James Thomas Peacock – Royal New Zealand Navy.
- Staff Sergeant Bernt Ludolf Sweder Fernand van Asbeck – Royal New Zealand Infantry Regiment (Territorial Force).
- Staff Sergeant Temporary Warrant Officer Second Class John Thomas Bennett – Royal New Zealand Engineers (Regular Force).
- Staff Sergeant Thomas Hippolite Rangi – Royal New Zealand Infantry Regiment (Regular Force).
- Corporal Peihopa Brown – New Zealand Special Air Service (Regular Force).
- Flight Sergeant James Halligan – Royal New Zealand Air Force.
- Flight Sergeant Dennis Owen Huggard – Royal New Zealand Air Force.

== Bar to Air Force Cross (AFC) ==
- Squadron Leader John Clark Buckmaster AFC – Royal New Zealand Air Force.

== Queen's Police Medal (QPM) ==
- Frank Laurence Diggle – superintendent, New Zealand Police Force.
- Bernard George Waller – senior sergeant, New Zealand Police Force.
