= Kīngi Īhaka =

New Zealand Anglican priest (1921–1993)

The Venerable Sir Kīngi Īhaka MBE JP

Personal life
- Born: 18 October 1921 Te Kao, New Zealand
- Died: 1 January 1993 (aged 71)
- Resting place: Purewa Cemetery
- Spouse: Manutūkē Sadlier (m. 1945; died 1972)
- Other name: Matu Īhaka

Religious life
- Religion: Anglicanism

Sir Kīngi Matutaera Īhaka MBE JP (18 October 1921 – 1 January 1993), known to his family as Matu Īhaka, was a New Zealand clerk, interpreter, Anglican priest, broadcaster and Māori Language Commissioner.

Of Māori descent, Īhaka identified with the Te Aupōuri iwi. He was born in Te Kao, Northland, on 18 October 1921, the 13th of 14 children.

Īhaka was appointed a Member of the Order of the British Empire in the 1970 Queen's Birthday Honours, for services to the Anglican Māori Church. In the 1989 New Year Honours, he was made a Knight Bachelor, for services to the Māori people. In 1990, he was awarded the New Zealand 1990 Commemoration Medal. He was buried at Purewa Cemetery in the Auckland suburb of Meadowbank.

== Pūkeko in a Ponga Tree ==
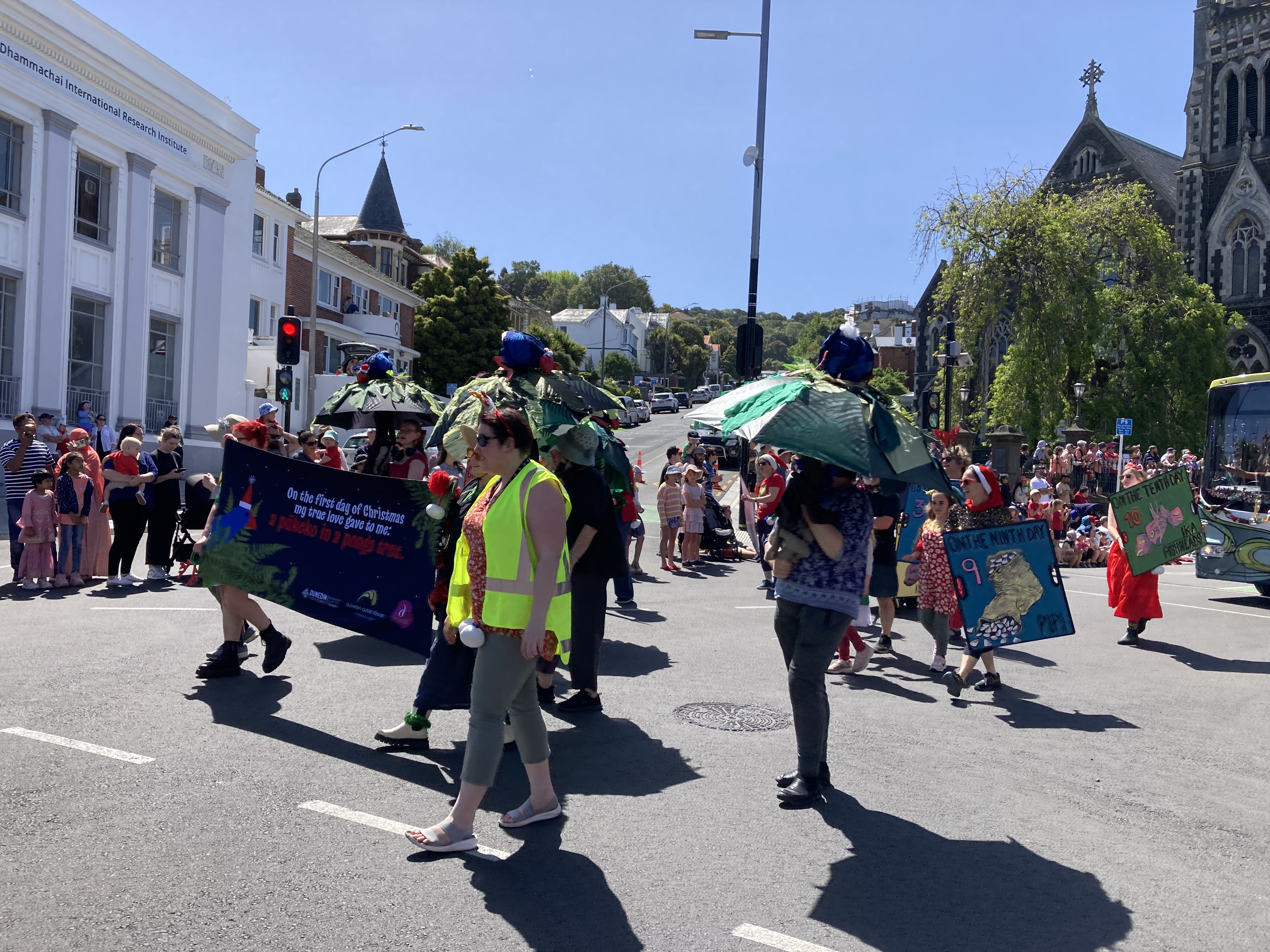
Participants in the 2024 Dunedin Santa Parade illustrating Pūkeko in a ponga tree. Several pūkeko are visible, as well as the illustrations for nine sacks of pipi and ten juicy fishheads.

Īhaka wrote a New Zealand version of the carol "Twelve Days of Christmas", which was published as a picture book in 1981 with illustrations by Dick Frizzell. Pukeko in a Ponga Tree became well-known and widely performed, and a fortieth anniversary edition was published by Penguin in 2021. Also in 2021, the Auckland Harbour Bridge Christmas lights were based on the song.

The song's verses describe the gifting of a pūkeko in a ponga tree, two kūmara, three flax kits, four huhu grubs, five big fat pigs, six poi a-twirling, seven eels a-swimming, eight plants of pūhā, nine sacks of pipi, ten juicy fish heads, eleven haka lessons, and twelve piupiu swinging.
