= No. 115 Squadron RAF =

Flying squadron of the Royal Air Force

- Squadron badge
- Active: 1 December 1917 – 1 April 1918 (RFC); 1 April 1918 – 18 October 1919 (RAF); 15 June 1937 – 1 March 1950; 13 June 1950 – 1 June 1957; 21 August 1958 – 1 October 1993; 1 October 2008 – present
- Country: United Kingdom
- Branch: Royal Air Force
- Type: Flying training squadron
- Role: Qualified flying instructor training
- Part of: No. 6 Flying Training School
- Home station: RAF Wittering
- Motto: Despite the elements
- Aircraft: Grob Tutor T1
- Battle honours: Independent Force & Germany (1918)*; Channel & North Sea (1939–1943)*; Norway (1940)*; France & Low Countries; German Ports (1940–1945)*; Ruhr (1940–1945)*; Fortress Europe (1940–1945)*; Invasion Ports (1940); Berlin (1940–1945)*; Biscay Ports 1940–1943; Baltic (1943); Normandy (1944)*; France & Germany (1944–1945); Rhine; * Honours marked with an asterisk may be emblazoned on the Squadron Standard

Insignia
- Squadron badge heraldry: A dexter hand erased at the wrist holding a tiller. The squadron laid great stress on the importance of navigation and the hand on the tiller is symbolic of this. Approved by King George VI in February 1938.
- Squadron codes: BK (Apr 1939 – Sep 1939); KO (Sep 1939 – Mar 1950, Jun 1950 – Apr 1951); A4 Nov 1943 – Oct 1944 (only used by 'C' Flt); IL Nov 1944 – Aug 1945

Number 115 Squadron is a Royal Air Force squadron operating the Grob Tutor T1, training QFIs for the RAF's Elementary Flying Training (EFT) squadrons and the University Air Squadrons, as well as undertaking evaluation and standardisation duties.

No. 115 Squadron was formed during the First World War. It was then equipped with Handley Page O/400 heavy bombers. During World War II the squadron served as a bomber squadron and after the war it flew in a similar role till 1958, when it was engaged as a radio calibration unit. The squadron disbanded for the last time as an operational unit in 1993, but reformed in 2008 at RAF Cranwell as No. 115(Reserve) Squadron, part of No. 22 Group, operating the Grob Tutor T.1 before moving to their present base at RAF Wittering.

== History ==
=== Formation and First World War ===
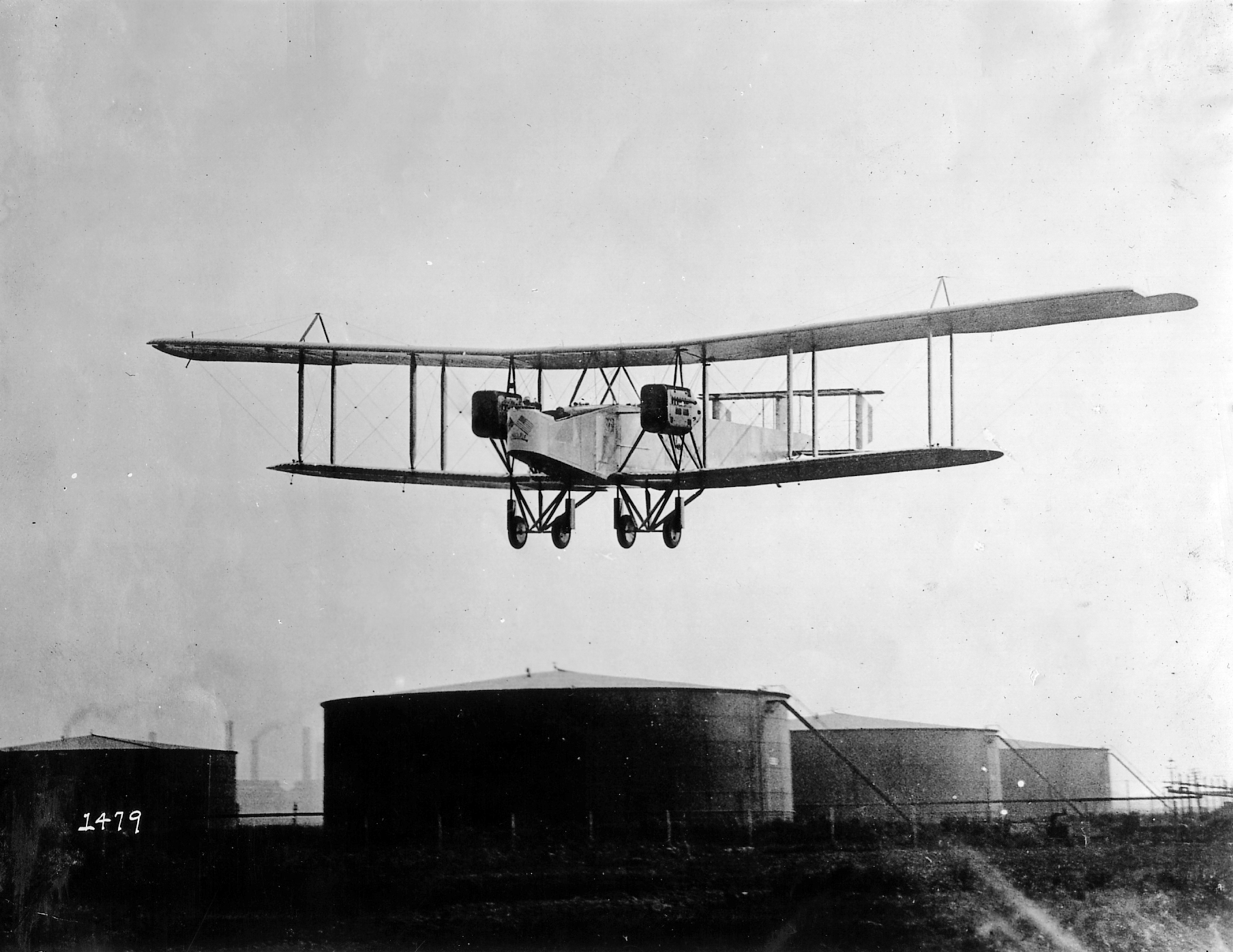
Handley Page O/400 as used by No. 115 Squadron

No. 115 Squadron, RFC, was formed at Catterick, Yorkshire, on 1 December 1917 from a nucleus provided by No. 52 Training Squadron. At the end of August 1918, after having been equipped with Handley Page O/400 twin-engined bombers, it joined the Independent Air Force in France. Its first raid was made in the night of 16/17 September when nearly 4 tons of bombs were dropped on Metz-Sablon. For this raid the squadron was congratulated by Major-General Sir Hugh Trenchard and the OC 83rd Wing who described the raid as "the finest piece of work which has ever been done by a new squadron". Its most successful raid was made against Morhange airfield when five O/400s, making double trips, dropped 6 1/2 tons of bombs on their objective. During its service in France, No. 115 made fifteen raids, the longest being to Baden and dropped 26 tons of bombs. From November 1918, 115 Squadron was based at Saint-Inglevert Aerodrome. The squadron returned to England on 4 March 1919 and disbanded on 18 October 1919 at RAF Ford Junction.

=== Reformation ===
The squadron was reformed from "B" Flight of No. 38 Squadron at RAF Marham, as No. 115 (Bomber) Squadron on 15 June 1937. It was now one of only two units to operate -temporarily- the Fairey Hendon monoplane bomber, but these were soon replaced by their intended equipment, the Handley Page Harrow. As these proved unsuited in the bomber role they were replaced from March 1939 with Wellingtons.

=== Second World War ===
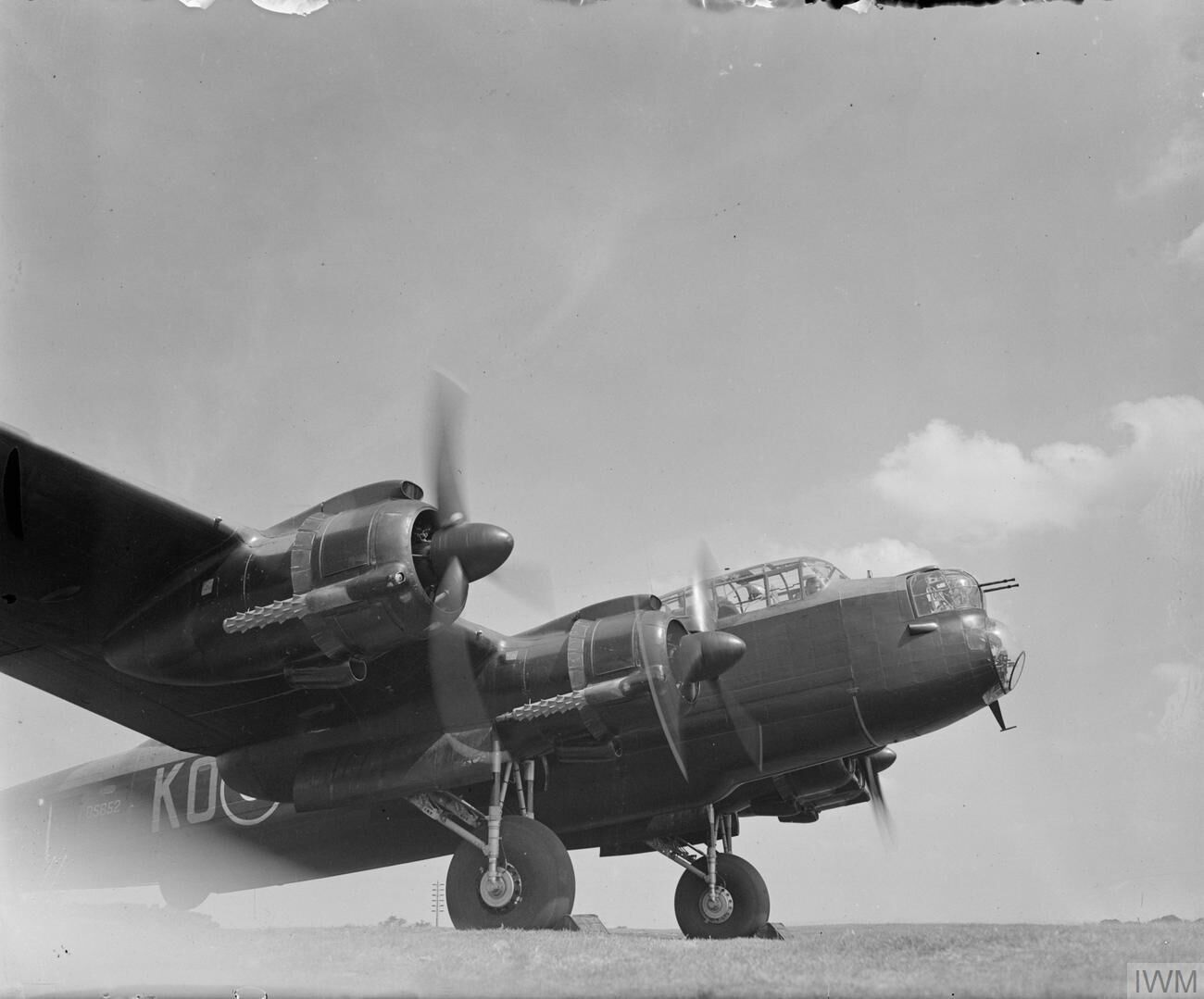
Engine testing on a Lancaster B.II of No. 115 Squadron at RAF East Wretham, 1943

In the Second World War, the squadron took part in scores of raids and also played an active part in Gardening (minelaying) for victory. In April 1940, while flying Wellingtons (and while on temporary loan to RAF Coastal Command) it gained the distinction of making the RAF's first bombing raid of the war on a mainland target - the enemy-held Norwegian airfield of Stavanger Airport, Sola. Sixteen months later, in August 1941, under the command of Trevor Freeman, it undertook the initial Service trials of Gee, the first of the great radar navigational and bombing aids. As a result of its subsequent report on these trials Gee was put into large-scale production for RAF Bomber Command.

The memoirs of Sydney Percival Smith, a Royal Canadian Air Force Wellington pilot, contain detailed personal descriptions of 115 Squadron missions in late 1942 from its base in RAF East Wretham. These were directed at targets in Germany (including Bremen, Stuttgart, Frankfurt and Munich) and Italy (Turin), as well as mine laying in French ports (Le Havre, Brest, St. Nazaire, and Lorient) and the Bay of Biscay.

Hercules-engined Avro Lancaster B.IIs replaced the Wellingtons in March 1943 and these were replaced by Merlin-engined Lancaster B.Is and B.IIIs in March 1944. The squadron relocated from RAF Little Snoring to RAF Witchford from 26 November 1943, moving to RAF Graveley on 10 September 1945.

=== Post-War (1945–1957) ===
The squadron was retained as part of the post-war RAF and received Avro Lincolns in September 1949. The squadron was linked to No. 218 Squadron from 1 February 1949 until 1 March 1950, when the squadron was disbanded at RAF Mildenhall.

The squadron was reformed on 13 June 1950, it became a Boeing Washington unit at RAF Marham, again having No. 218 Squadron linked to it. English Electric Canberras replaced the Washingtons in February 1954 and continued in use until disbanding on 1 June 1957.

=== Calibration (1958–1993) ===
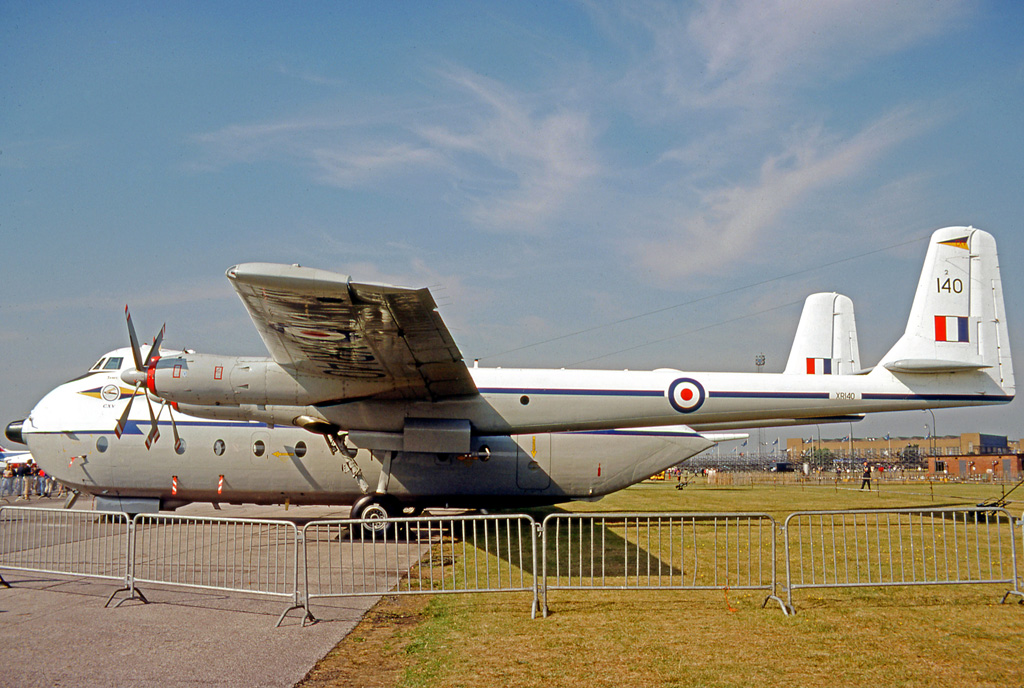
Argosy E.1 of No. 115 Squadron, based at RAF Brize Norton, displayed at the Queen's Silver Jubilee Review at RAF Finningley in July 1977.

The squadron came back on 21 August 1958, when No. 116 Squadron at RAF Tangmere was renumbered. It was now a Radar Calibration unit operating Vickers Varsitys, Valettas and briefly the Handley Page Hastings. Armstrong Whitworth Argosies began arriving in February 1968 and when the last Varsity was retired in August 1970, the unit was solely equipped with this type. No. 115 Squadron moved to RAF Cottesmore in 1968 (or possibly earlier). The squadron moved to RAF Brize Norton in 1976. Hawker Siddeley Andovers were added to the strength there in November 1976 and the last Argosy left in January 1978. In 1982, No. 115 Squadron was moved to RAF Benson, the Andovers continuing until disbanding there on 1 October 1993.

=== Flying training (2008–present) ===
The squadron was reformed on 1 October 2008 at RAF Cranwell as part of the reorganisation of the RAF's elementary flying training units, including the withdrawal of RAF students from the Defence Elementary Flying Training School at nearby RAF Barkston Heath. While three other dormant squadrons, Nos. 16, 57 and 85 Squadrons, were reinstated to carry out ab initio elementary flying training, No. 115(Reserve) Squadron was given the task of the Central Flying School (Elementary) Squadron of conducting the flying stages of the training of new Qualified Flying Instructors (QFIs). There are two courses run at the Squadron; for new instructors, the 'Main Course' includes 3 weeks of ground school and 80 flying hours, taking approximately 6 months in all. The 'Refresher Course', for previously qualified instructors of any background who have either spent time away from instructional duties or are changing the type of aircraft they instruct on, is 2 months long with 40 flying hours. The majority of graduates of the CFS courses will then work on one of the RAF EFT Squadrons, the University Air Squadrons or with the Army and Navy EFT Squadrons (674 Squadron Army Air Corps and 703 Naval Air Squadron respectively) at RAF Barkston Heath.

== Aircraft operated ==
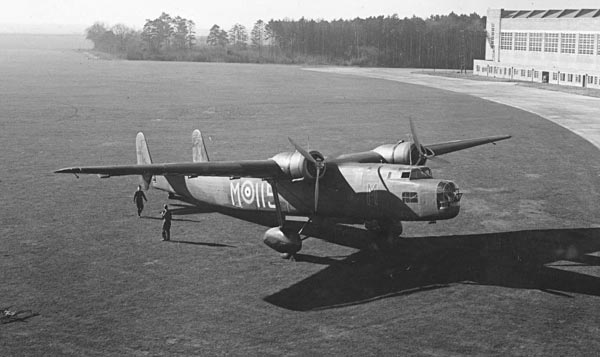
Handley Page Harrow of No. 115 Squadron, 1939

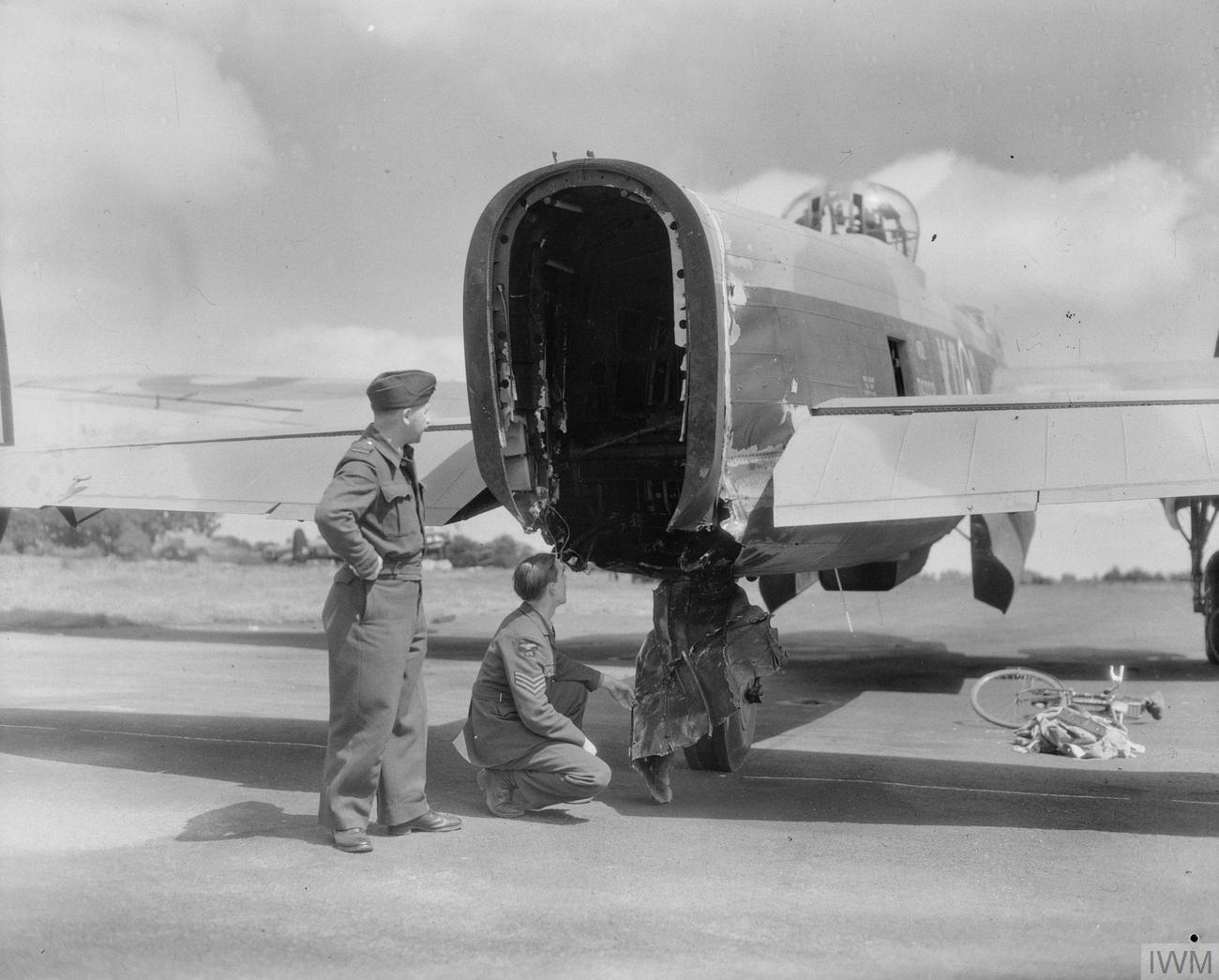
Crewmembers inspect tail of 115 Squadron Lancaster Mark II which had its rear turret sheared off by bombs dropped from above during a raid on Cologne, June 1943

Aircraft operated by No. 115 Squadron RAF
From	To	Aircraft	Variant	Remark
Jul 1918	Mar 1919	Handley Page Type O	O/400	
Jun 1937	Aug 1937	Fairey Hendon	Mk.II	(on loan from No. 38 Squadron RAF)
Jun 1937	Sep 1939	Handley Page Harrow	Mk.II	
Apr 1939	Nov 1939	Vickers Wellington	Mk.I	
Sep 1939	Aug 1940	Vickers Wellington	Mk.Ia	
Apr 1940	Mar 1942	Vickers Wellington	Mk.Ic	
Nov 1941	Mar 1943	Vickers Wellington	Mk.III	
Mar 1943	May 1944	Avro Lancaster	Mk.II	
Mar 1944	Nov 1949	Avro Lancaster	Mks.I, III	
Sep 1949	Mar 1950	Avro Lincoln	B.2	
Aug 1950	Feb 1954	Boeing Washington	B.1	
Feb 1954	Jun 1957	English Electric Canberra	B.2	
Aug 1958	Aug 1970	Vickers Varsity	T.1	
Oct 1963	May 1964	Vickers Valetta	C.1	
Jan 1967	Jan 1969	Handley Page Hastings	C.2	
Feb 1968	Jan 1978	Armstrong Whitworth Argosy	E.1	
Nov 1976	Oct 1993	Hawker Siddeley Andover	C.1, E.3	
Oct 2008	present	Grob Tutor	T.1	

== Orders, decorations, and medals ==
Members of the squadron have received the following orders, decorations, and medals.

- 142 DFC and 2 Bars to DFC
- 68 DFM
- 6 BEM
- 4 DSO
- 4 MBE
- 3 AFC
- 2 AFM and 1 Bar to AFM plus 1 CGM.

== See also ==
- Nicholas Alkemade who survived a freefall of 18,000 feet (5,490 m) without a parachute after abandoning his out-of-control, burning Lancaster over Germany.
