= No. 17 Squadron RNZAF =

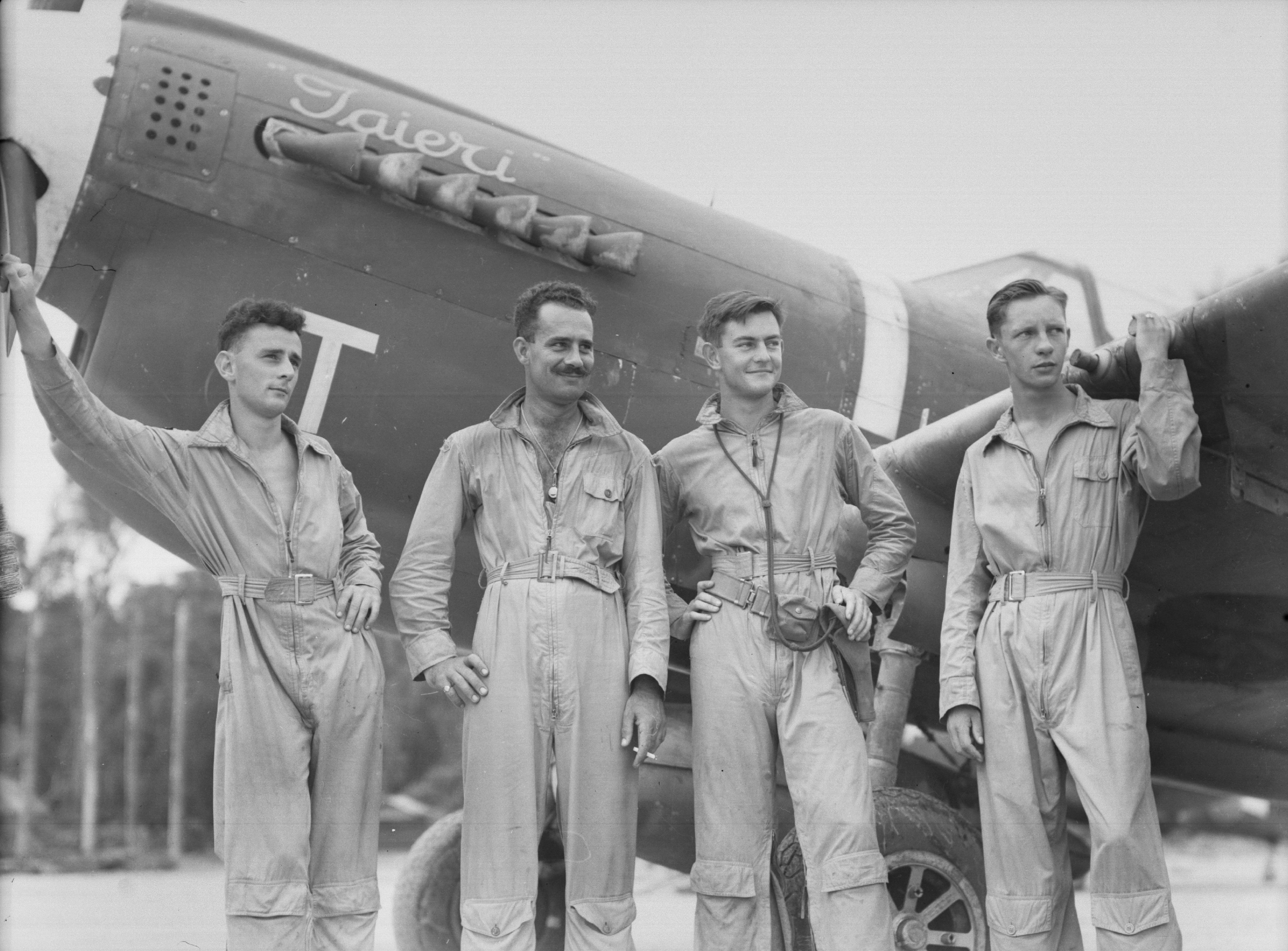
- Group of No. 17 Squadron pilots with a P-40 Kittyhawk at Torokina Airfield, Bougainville Island
- Active: October 1942 – September 1945
- Country: New Zealand
- Branch: Royal New Zealand Air Force
- Role: Fighter
- Equipment: P-40 Kittyhawk; F4U Corsair
- Engagements: World War II

No. 17 Squadron was a fighter squadron of the Royal New Zealand Air Force. Formed in October 1942 at Ohakea, the squadron was initially equipped with Curtiss P-40 Kittyhawks, before converting to F4U-1 Corsairs in 1944. The squadron fought in the Pacific theatre during World War II, flying combat operations against Japanese forces until it was disbanded in late 1945.

== History ==
The Squadron formed at Ohakea, New Zealand in October 1942 on North American Harvards and Curtiss P-40 Kittyhawks; after a period of training it moved to New Georgia in January 1943, Santo in July and then Guadalcanal in September and Bougainville in January 1944, rotating between these bases and serving largely in an air-to-air role, in which it enjoyed considerable success. By mid-1944 when the squadron converted to more potent Vought Corsairs, Japanese aerial activity had all but ceased in the South West Pacific, and the unit was largely deployed in a ground attack role, despite moving to Green Island in January 1945, and Los Negros in May.

The squadron was still in Los Negros when disbanded in September 1945.

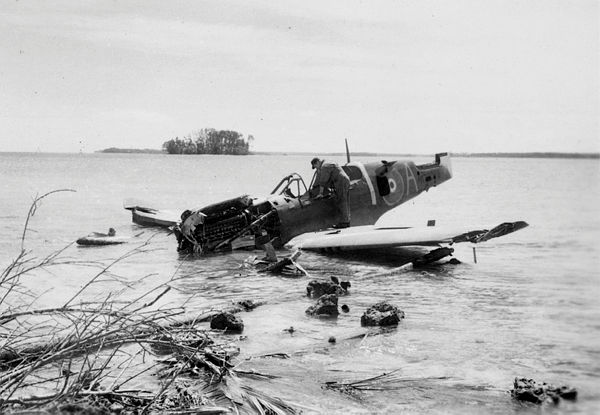
A crashed Kittyhawk of No. 17 Squadron in the shallow waters on the approach to Munda airstrip, New Georgia; September 1943

== Commanding officers ==
The following officers commanded the squadron:

- Squadron Leader J. V. A. Reid (October 1942–July 1943);
- Squadron Leader P. G. Newton (July 1943–January 1944);
- Squadron Leader D. F. St. George (April–November 1944);
- Squadron Leader B. V. Le Pine (November 1944–September 1945).
