= Ondonga Airfield =

Airfield

- Ondonga Island, New Georgia

Site information
- Type: Military Airfield
- Controlled by: Royal New Zealand Air Force; United States Navy
- Condition: abandoned

Location
- Coordinates: 08°15′54″S 157°12′00″E

Site history
- Built: 1943
- Built by: Seebees
- In use: 1943-4
- Materials: Coral
- Battles/wars: Bougainville Campaign; Operation Cartwheel

Ondonga Airfield is a former World War II airfield on New Georgia in the Solomon Islands archipelago.

== History ==
=== World War II ===
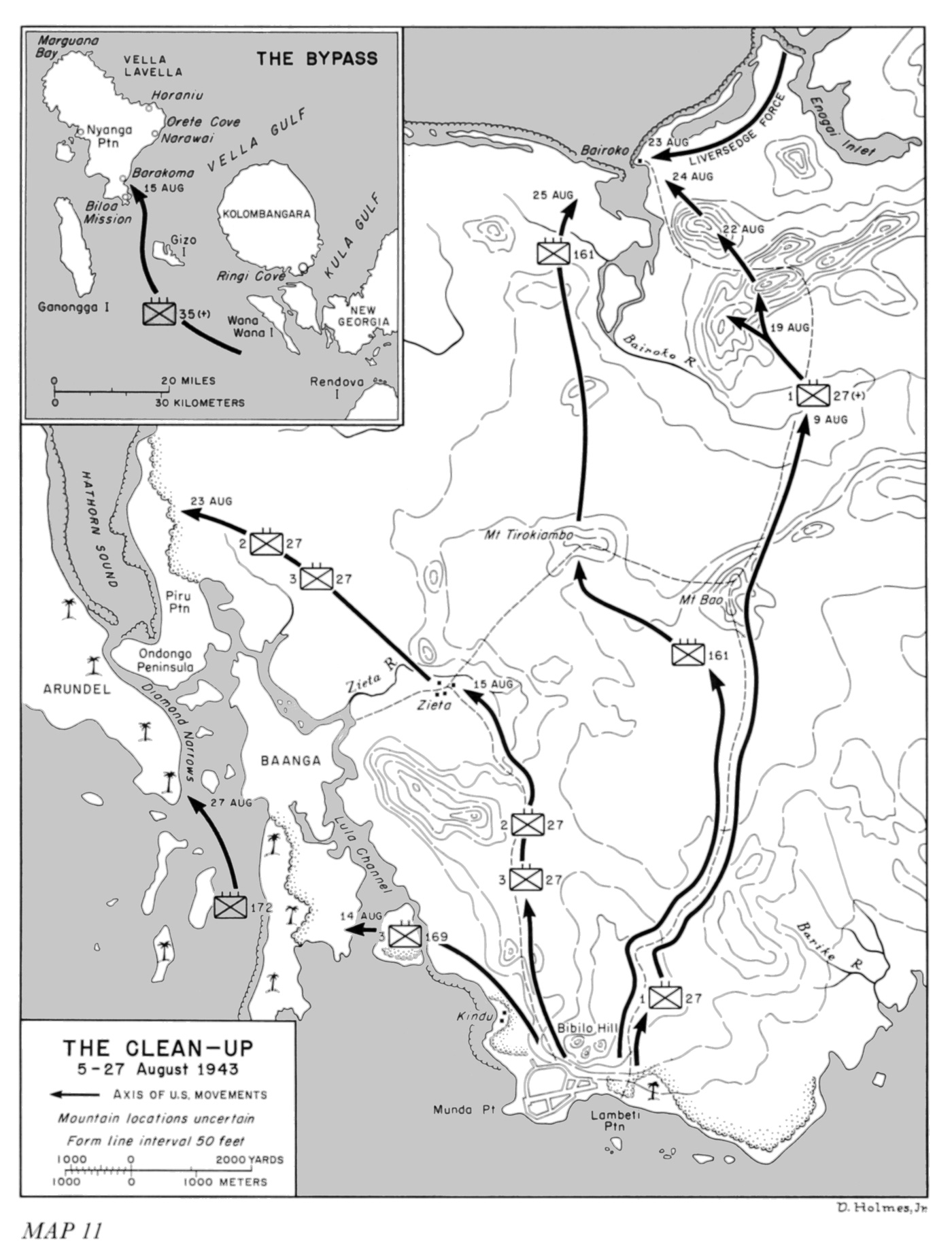
Map of Allied operations on New Georgia 5–27 August 1943

The Munda Point area was secured on 5 August 1943. While the rehabilitation and expansion of Munda Point Airfield was the first priority for the Seebees, the 37th and 82nd Naval Construction Battalions soon began building another fighter airfield on Ondonga Island across from Munda Point. Construction proceeded with difficulty as the island was covered with dense jungle over bog and the site was periodically shelled by Japanese artillery on Kolombangara Island and bombed by Japanese aircraft flying from Bougainville. After 25 days the Seebees had completed a coral-surfaced 4,500 feet (1,400 m) by 200 feet (61 m) fighter runway. By February 1944 the Seebees had completed a second parallel runway, roads, taxiways, hardstands, a control tower and a 12,000 barrel tank farm.

Royal New Zealand Air Force units based at Ondonga included:

- 14 Squadron operating P-40 Kittyhawks from November–December 1943
- 15 Squadron operating P-40s from October–November 1943 and December 1943-January 1944
- 16 Squadron operating P-40s from November 1943-January 1944
- 17 Squadron operating P-40s January 1944
- 18 Squadron operating P-40s from October–November 1943

US Navy units based at Ondonga included:

- VF-17 operating F4Us
- VF-33 operating F6Fs
- VP-12 operating PBYs

USMC units based at Ondonga included:

- VMF-216 operating F4Us

=== Postwar ===
The airfield is abandoned and overgrown with vegetation.

== See also ==
- Barakoma Airfield
- Munda Airport
- United States Army Air Forces in the South Pacific Area
