= Caretaker =

Caretaker may refer to:

== Occupations ==
- Janitor (chiefly in the United States), a person who cleans and maintains buildings such as hospitals and schools
- Property caretaker, a person who cares for a property
- Caregiver or carer (UK), a person who cares for another person
- Caretaker manager, someone who takes temporary charge of team affairs of a football club

== Film, television and theatre ==
- The Caretaker (play), a 1960 play by Harold Pinter
- The Caretaker (1963 film), a British adaptation of Pinter's play
- The Caretakers (2025 film), a British independent psychological horror thriller
- The Caretakers (1963 film), an American drama film
- The Caretakers (2025 film), a Philippine horror film
- Caretaker, a character in the 1974 film The Longest Yard and the 2005 remake

=== Television episodes ===
- "Caretaker" (Law & Order: Special Victims Unit), 2018
- "Caretaker" (Not Going Out), 2006
- "Caretaker" (Star Trek: Voyager), 1995
- "The Caretaker" (Doctor Who), 2014
- "The Caretaker" (Motherland), 2017

== Literature ==
- Caretaker (comics), a Marvel Comics character who appeared in Ghost Rider and the Marvel Cinematic Universe series Helstrom
- The Caretaker (Pelevin novel), a 2015 novel by Victor Pelevin
- The Caretaker (Rash novel)
- The Caretaker Trilogy, a 2006–2009 series of science-fiction novels by David Klass

== Music ==
- Caretaker (band), an English rock band
- The Caretaker (musician), James Leyland Kirby (born 1974), English ambient musician
- The Caretaker (album), a 2020 album by Half Waif

== Other uses ==
- Caretaker (military), a detachment assigned to maintain an inactive facility
- Caretaker gene, a group of tumour suppressor genes
- Caretaker government, a temporary government
- Caretaker Ministry (disambiguation), one of three short-lived governments of Great Britain

== See also ==
- Caretakers Cottage, an Australian organisation which assists homeless kids
