= Caretaker government =

Type of provisional or temporary government

A caretaker government, also known as a caretaker regime, is a temporary ad hoc government that performs some governmental duties and functions in a country until a regular government is elected or formed. Depending on specific practice, it consists of either randomly selected members of parliament or outgoing members until their dismissal.

Caretaker governments in representative democracies are usually limited in their function (except certain scenarios), serving only to maintain the status quo, rather than truly govern and propose new legislation. Unlike the government it is meant to temporarily replace, a caretaker government does not have a legitimate mandate (electoral approval) to exercise aforementioned functions.

== Definition ==
Caretaker governments may be put in place when a government in a parliamentary system is defeated in a motion of no confidence, or in the case when the house to which the government is responsible is dissolved, to be in place for an interim period until an election is held and a new government is formed. In this sense, in some countries which use a Westminster system of government, the caretaker government is simply the incumbent government, which continues to operate in the interim period between the normal dissolution of parliament for the purpose of holding an election and the formation of a new government after the election results are known. Unlike in ordinary times, the caretaker government's activities are limited by custom and convention.

In systems where coalition governments are frequent a caretaker government may be installed temporarily while negotiations to form a new coalition take place. This usually occurs either immediately after an election in which there is no clear victor or if one coalition government collapses and a new one must be negotiated. Caretaker governments are expected to handle daily issues and prepare budgets for discussion, but are not expected to produce a government platform or introduce controversial bills.

A caretaker government is often set up following a war until stable democratic rule can be restored, or installed, in which case it is often referred to as a provisional government.

== Caretaker governments associated with elections ==
Many countries are administered by a caretaker government during election periods, such as:

- Caretaker government of Australia
- Caretaker government of Bangladesh
- Caretaker government of Canada
- Demissionary cabinet, a Dutch caretaker cabinet
- Caretaker government of Malaysia
- Caretaker government of Pakistan

Other countries that use similar mechanisms include New Zealand, and Finland

== Caretakers ==
Heads of caretaker governments are often referred to as a "caretaker" head, for example "caretaker prime minister".

Similarly, but chiefly in the United States, caretakers are individuals who fill seats in government temporarily without ambitions to continue to hold office on their own. This is particularly true with regard to United States senators who are appointed to office by the governor of their state following a vacancy created by the death or resignation of a sitting senator. Sometimes governors wish to run for the seat themselves in the next election but do not want to be accused of unfairness by arranging their own appointments in the interim. Also, sometimes they do not wish to be seen as taking sides within a group of party factions or prejudicing of a primary election by picking someone who is apt to become an active candidate for the position.

In some cases, appointment of a caretaker is an opportunity for a Governor to appoint a chief of staff, party leader, counsel, or other senior adviser to the position, as a reward for service or to boost their résumé. Examples include Deval Patrick appointing Paul G. Kirk, Chris Christie appointing Jeffrey Chiesa, and Phil Murphy appointing George Helmy as Senators, the latter two from New Jersey.

At one time, widows of politicians were often selected as caretakers to succeed their late husbands; in a phenomenon known as "widow’s succession." At the beginning of the 20th century, it was one of the most effective ways of getting women into Congress, even though the widow may have originally only been supposed to act as a placeholder for her dead husband and was only expected to serve for a brief period. The widows may have been selected to honor the deceased member, tap voters’ sympathy, or exploit name recognition to hold onto a seat while more conventional candidates prepared for the real campaign. It also may have helped some of the women grieve and make up for the sudden loss of income in a world where few worked outside the home. Among first-time candidates for the US House of Representatives from 1916 to 1993, 84% of the widows won, while only 14% of other women were victorious. The trend was strongest when women were rarer in politics; 35 of the 95 women who served in Congress through 1976 were congressional wives first. Political scientist Diane Kincaid wrote that "statistically, at least, for women aspiring to serve in Congress, the best husband has been a dead husband." Academics Lisa Solowiej and Thomas L. Brunell called it "arguably the single most important historical method for women to enter Congress."

Nevertheless, this custom is rarely exercised today, as it could be viewed by some as nepotism.

In Canada and most other English-speaking countries, the more widely accepted term in this context is interim, as in interim leader. In Italy, this kind of premier is the President of Government of Experts.

=== List of caretaker individuals ===
The following is a list of individuals who have been considered caretaker (or provisional or interim) heads of state or heads of government:

==== Heads of state ====
- Pehr Evind Svinhufvud, Regent of Finland in 1917–1918
- Carl Gustaf Emil Mannerheim, Regent of Finland in 1918–1919
- José Linhares (Brazil, October 1945 – January 1946)
- Nereu Ramos (Brazil, November 1955 – January 1956)
- Pascoal Ranieri Mazzilli (Brazil, August – September 1961)
- Win Maung (Burma/Myanmar, 1962)
- V. V. Giri (India, May – July 1969)
- Mohammad Hidayatullah (India, July – August 1969)
- Alain Poher (France, April – June 1969 and April – May 1974)
- Basappa Danappa Jatti (India, February – July 1977)
- Émile Jonassaint (Haiti, June 1993 – October 1994)
- Wasim Sajjad (Pakistan, December 1997 – January 1998)
- Eduardo Duhalde (Argentina, January 2002 – May 2003)
- Sir Guy Green (Australia, May – August 2003)
- Eduardo Rodríguez (Bolivia, June 2005 – January 2006)
- Muhammad Mian Soomro (Pakistan, August 2008 – September 2009)
- Kgalema Motlanthe (South Africa, September 2008 – May 2009)
- Bronisław Komorowski (Poland, April – July 2010)
- László Kövér (Hungary, April – May 2012 and February – March 2024)
- Jens Böhrnsen (Germany, May – June 2010)
- Horst Seehofer (Germany, February – March 2012)
- Alejandro Maldonado Aguirre (Guatemala, September 2015 – January 2016)
- Francisco Sagasti (Peru, November 2020 – July 2021)
- Richard Wagner (Canada, January – July 2021)
- Delcy Rodríguez (Venezuela, 3 January 2026 – now)

==== Heads of government ====
===== 19th century and earlier =====
- Arthur Wellesley, 1st Duke of Wellington (United Kingdom, second term, Nov – Dec 1834)

===== 20th century =====
- John Chalker Crosbie (caretaker Prime Minister of Newfoundland from 31 December 1917 – 5 January 1918)
- Albert Hickman (caretaker Prime Minister of Newfoundland 10 May 1924 – 9 June 1924)
- Jorge B. Vargas (as Chairman of the Philippine Executive Commission, 1942 – 43)
- Winston Churchill (United Kingdom, May – July 1945)
- Vincent Auriol (France, Nov – Dec 1946)
- General Ne Win (Burma/Myanmar, 1962)
- Gulzarilal Nanda (India, 1964 and 1966)
- Jelle Zijlstra (Netherlands, Nov 1966 – April 1967)
- Walter Scheel (West Germany, May 1974)
- Malcolm Fraser (Australia, first term only, 1975)
- Mehdi Bazargan (Iran, 1979)
- Mohammad-Reza Mahdavi Kani (Iran, Sep – Oct 1981)
- Ghulam Mustafa Jatoi (Pakistan, Aug – Nov 1990)
  - Jatoi caretaker government
- Waldemar Pawlak (Poland, first term, 1992)
- Moeenuddin Ahmad Qureshi (Pakistan, Jul – Oct 1993)
  - Qureshi caretaker government
- Balakh Sher Mazari (Pakistan, Apr – May 1993)
  - Mazari caretaker government
- Jean Kambanda (Rwanda, April – July 1994)
- Jozef Moravčík (Slovakia, March – Dec 1994)
- Muhammad Habibur Rahman (Bangladesh, 1996)
- Malik Meraj Khalid (Pakistan, Nov 1996 – Feb 1997)
- Hashim Thaçi (Kosovo, first term, 1999–2000)

===== 21st century =====
- Latifur Rahman (Bangladesh, 2001)
- Iajuddin Ahmed (Bangladesh, 2007)
- Fakhruddin Ahmed (Bangladesh, 2007–2009)
- Muhammad Mian Soomro (Pakistan, 2007–2008)
- Madhav Kumar Nepal (Nepal, 2009–2010)
- Yves Leterme (Belgium, 2009 – 2011)
- Brian Cowen (Ireland, Jan – Mar 2011)
- Marin Raykov (Bulgaria, Mar – May 2013)
  - Raykov Government
- Mir Hazar Khan Khoso (Pakistan, Mar – Jun 2013)
  - Khoso caretaker government
- Vassiliki Thanou-Christophilou (Greece, Aug – Sep 2015)
  - Caretaker Cabinet of Vassiliki Thanou-Christophilou
- Ahmet Davutoğlu (Turkey, Aug – Nov 2015)
  - 63rd cabinet of Turkey
- Mariano Rajoy (Spain, 2015 – 16)
- Enda Kenny (Ireland, 2016)
- Emil Dimitriev (North Macedonia, 2016–17)
- Angela Merkel (Germany, third term, Oct 2017–March 2018)
- Nasirul Mulk (Pakistan, Jun – Aug 2018)
  - Mulk caretaker government
- Oliver Spasovski (North Macedonia, 2020)
- Mahathir Mohamad (Malaysia, February 2020)
- Leo Varadkar (Ireland, 2020, Mar – Apr 2024)
- Brigitte Bierlein (Austria, Jun 2019 – Jan 2020)
  - Bierlein government
- Min Aung Hlaing (Myanmar, since February 2021)
- Stefan Löfven (Sweden, 2021)
- Stefan Yanev (Bulgaria, May – Dec 2021)
  - First Yanev Government
  - Second Yanev Government
- Muhyiddin Yassin (Malaysia, August 2021)
- Erna Solberg (Norway, Sep – Oct 2021)
- Angela Merkel (Germany, fourth term, Oct – Dec 2021)
- Yair Lapid (Israel, 2022)
- Galab Donev (Bulgaria, Aug 2022 – Jun 2023)
  - First Donev Government
  - Second Donev Government
- Mario Draghi (Italy, Draghi Cabinet, 2022)
- Ismail Sabri Yaakob (Malaysia, 2022 Malaysian general election)
- Eduard Heger (Slovakia, Heger's Cabinet, Dec 2022 – May 2023)
- Ľudovít Ódor (Slovakia, May – Oct 2023)
  - Cabinet of Ľudovít Ódor
- Prayut Chan-o-cha (Thailand, 2023 Thai general election)
- Ioannis Sarmas (Greece, May – Jun 2023)
  - Caretaker Cabinet of Ioannis Sarmas
- Mark Rutte (Netherlands, 2023 – 2024)
- Anwaar ul Haq Kakar (Pakistan, 2024 Pakistani general election)
  - Kakar caretaker ministry
- Élisabeth Borne (France, 2024)
- Sama Lukonde (DR Congo, February – June 2024)
- Dimitar Glavchev (Bulgaria, April 2024 – January 2025)
  - First Glavchev Government
  - Second Glavchev Government
- António Costa (Portugal, 2024 Portuguese legislative election)
- Alexander De Croo (Belgium, 2024 Belgian federal election)
- Gabriel Attal (France, 2024 French legislative election)
- Muhammad Yunus (Bangladesh, 2024 – 2026)
  - Yunus ministry
- Michel Barnier (France, December 2024)
- Mohammad Ghazi al-Jalali (Syria, 2024)
- Olaf Scholz (Germany, Mar – May 2025)
- Mohammed al-Bashir (Syria, 2024 – 2025)
  - Syrian caretaker government
- Anutin Charnvirakul (Thailand, 2026 Thai general election)
- Evika Siliņa (Latvia, 14 May 2026 – 28 May 2026)
- Darline Graham (United States, South Carolina, July 14, 2026 - current)
- Benjamin Netanyahu (Israel, 2026 Israeli legislative election)
- Christopher Luxon (New Zealand, 2026 New Zealand general election)

== See also ==
- Acting (law), in law, a person acting in a position temporarily, not serving in the position on a permanent basis
- Caretaker ministry (disambiguation), in British politics
- Demissionary cabinet, in Dutch politics
- Lame duck (politics)
- Provisional government
- Rump cabinet, in Dutch politics
