= RAF Lossiemouth =

Royal Air Force main operating base in Moray, Scotland

RAF Lossiemouth
- Near Lossiemouth, Moray in Scotland
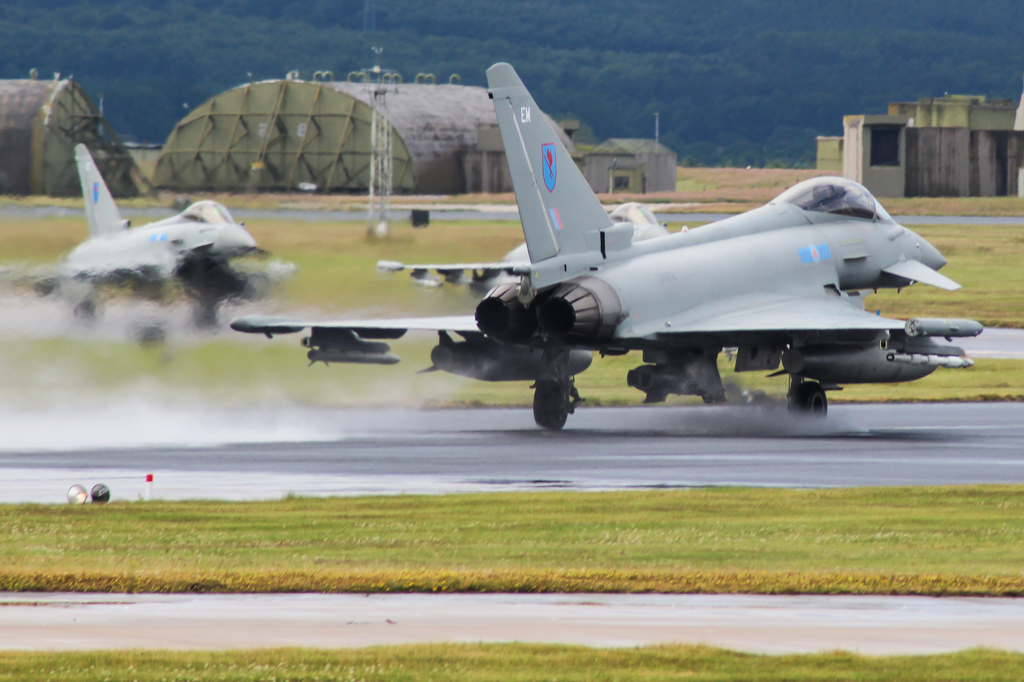
- A Typhoon FGR4 in No. 6 Squadron markings taking off from runway 23 at Lossiemouth

- Thoir an aire (Scottish Gaelic for 'Watch Out')

Site information
- Type: Main Operating Base
- Owner: Ministry of Defence
- Operator: Royal Air Force
- Controlled by: No. 1 Group (Air Combat)
- Condition: Operational
- Website: Official website

Location
- Shown within Moray RAF Lossiemouth (the United Kingdom)
- Coordinates: 57°42′19″N 003°20′21″W
- Grid reference: NJ210695
- Area: 580 hectares (1,400 acres)

Site history
- Built: 1938–1939
- In use: 1939–1946 (Royal Air Force); 1946–1972 (Fleet Air Arm); 1972 – present (Royal Air Force)

Garrison information
- Current commander: Group Captain Rob Croft
- Occupants: Flying units: No. 1 Squadron; No. 2 Squadron; No. 6 Squadron; No. 8 Squadron; No. 9 Squadron; No. 120 Squadron; No. 201 Squadron; See Based units section for full list.

Airfield information
- Identifiers: IATA: LMO, ICAO: EGQS, WMO: 03068
- Elevation: 42 feet (13 m) AMSL
Runways
Direction	Length and surface
05/23	2,764 metres (9,068 ft) Asphalt
10/28	1,850 metres (6,070 ft) Asphalt
- Source: UK MIL AIP Lossiemouth

Royal Air Force Lossiemouth or RAF Lossiemouth (IATA: LMO, ICAO: EGQS) is a Royal Air Force station located on the western edge of the town of Lossiemouth in Moray, north-east Scotland.

Since the closure of RAF Leuchars in 2015, Lossiemouth is the only operational RAF station in Scotland. It is one of two main operating bases for the Eurofighter Typhoon FGR4 in the United Kingdom. It is home to four front-line fast jet units which operate the Typhoon: No. 1 Squadron, No. 2 Squadron, No. 6 Squadron and No. 9 Squadron. All four Squadrons contribute to the Quick Reaction Alert (Interceptor) North capability which provides continuous protection of UK airspace.

The station is also home to No. 120 Squadron and No. 201 Squadron, both flying the Boeing Poseidon MRA1 in the maritime patrol role. No. 8 Squadron will operate the RAF's new fleet of three Boeing Wedgetail AEW1 airborne early warning and control aircraft, with aircrew training expected to commence in 2025. No. 42 Squadron is the operational conversion unit for the Poseidon and Wedgetail. There are some non-flying units at RAF Lossiemouth, including No. 5 Force Protection Wing and a Royal Air Force Mountain Rescue Service team.

The airfield opened in 1939 and was operated by the RAF, predominantly as part of RAF Bomber Command, until 1946 when it transferred to the Fleet Air Arm (FAA) and became known as RNAS Lossiemouth or HMS Fulmar. Lossiemouth was used as a training station by the FAA until it was handed back to the RAF in September 1972, after which it has largely operated as a fast-jet base.

== History ==
=== Construction (1938–1939) ===
Construction started during the summer of 1938, when 220 hectares (540 acres) of agricultural land were acquired to accommodate the airfield. Five farms were requisitioned: Newlands, Coulardbank, Greens, Smithfield and Kinnedar. The land was cleared of vegetation and buildings, and by spring 1939, several wooden huts had been constructed. Group Captain P.E. Maitland was the first station commander and took up post in March 1939, with the station formally opening on 1 May 1939.

The first unit to take up residence at Lossiemouth was No. 15 Flying Training School (No. 15 FTS), initially equipped with thirteen Airspeed Oxfords and five Hawker Harts. Aircraft were stored in the open until the first hangars were completed in August 1939. That same month, tragedy struck when three crew members were killed during a mid-air collision between two Oxfords.

=== Second World War (1939–1945) ===
At the outbreak of the Second World War, a detachment of Seaforth Highlanders was sent to Lossiemouth to guard the station, and anti-aircraft defences were installed. Flying activity increased, with No. 15 FTS receiving further aircraft, including Oxfords and Harts; the introduction of the North American Harvard; and eleven Fairey Battles delivered for storage. The first front-line aircraft to operate from Lossiemouth were a detachment of twelve Vickers Wellington medium bombers belonging to No. 99 Squadron. The squadron arrived in November 1939 to take part in attack missions targeting the German cruiser Deutschland, which was operating between Iceland and the Shetland Isles. January 1940 saw detachments from No. 44 Squadron and No. 50 Squadron operating the Handley Page Hampden medium bomber arriving to take part in offensive patrols over the North Sea. However, the operation was short-lived due to adverse weather, with the aircraft departing in mid-February.

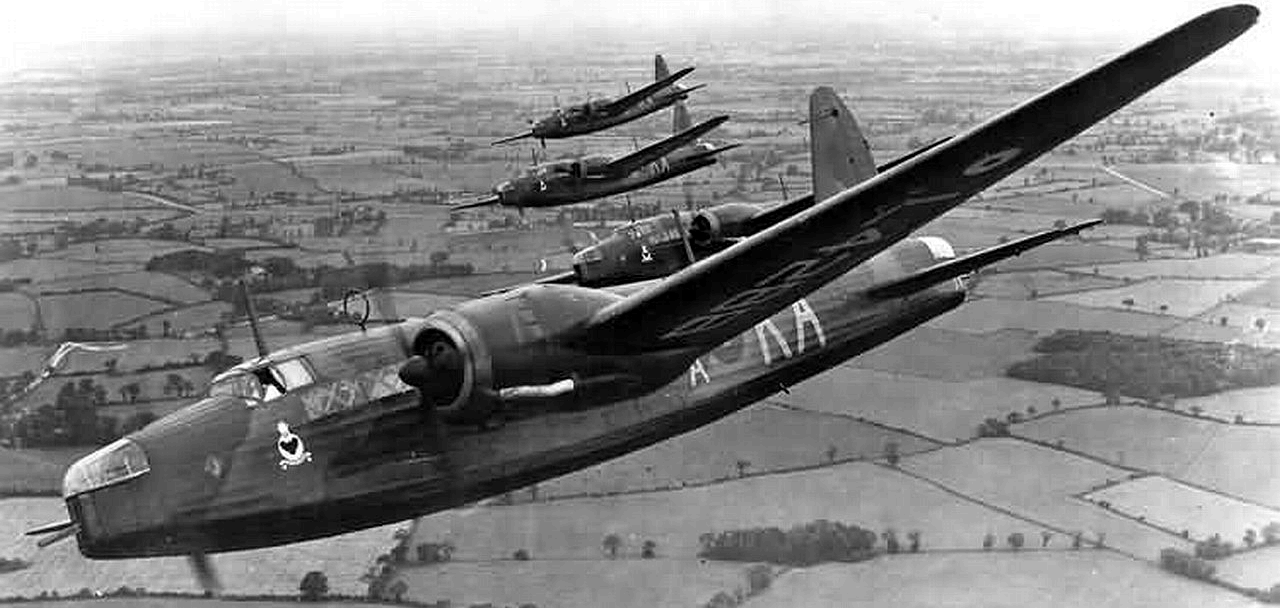
Wellington bombers of No. 9 Squadron which operated from Lossiemouth during 1940

A detachment of No. 9 Squadron spent a short period operating Wellingtons during April 1940, before their replacement by No. 107 Squadron and No. 110 Squadron, both equipped with the Bristol Blenheim light bomber. The first loss to enemy action of an aircraft operating from Lossiemouth occurred during this period, when three Blenheims were shot down over Norway.

It became apparent that the frequent detachments of bomber aircraft were disrupting the training programme at Lossiemouth. Therefore, due to the strategic importance of the station as a base for bomber aircraft, it was decided to relocate No. 15 FTS to RAF Middle Wallop in Hampshire. On 27 April 1940, after the unit's departure, Lossiemouth transferred to No. 6 Group of RAF Bomber Command and No. 20 Operational Training Unit (No. 20 OTU) was established, initially operating Wellingtons and Avro Ansons.

No. 46 Maintenance Unit (No. 46 MU) was also formed in April 1940. The unit's role was to modify and fit out new aircraft before they were forwarded to front-line squadrons. A variety of aircraft were serviced, including Hawker Hurricanes, de Havilland Tiger Moths, Hawker Audaxes, and a de Havilland Hornet Moth. The unit primarily used six Robin and eight Super Robin hangars; however, due to a shortage of space, many aircraft were stored in fields outside the station. Lossiemouth's first satellite airfield, located at Bogs of Mayne 10 miles (16 km) to the south and known as RAF Elgin, opened in June 1940.

One officer and two aircrew were killed on 26 October 1940 when RAF Lossiemouth was attacked by the Luftwaffe for the first time. The attack by three Heinkel He 111 medium bombers destroyed two Blenheims and damage to two Miles Magisters, two Tiger Moths and a Hurricane. Three hangars were also damaged, the resultant holes from cannon fire still visible today. One of the Heinkels crashed on the airfield, having either been hit by ground fire or destroyed by its own bombs. All four of the crew are buried in a Lossiemouth churchyard. To protect the area from further attacks, Hurricanes of No. 232 Squadron were deployed to RAF Elgin.

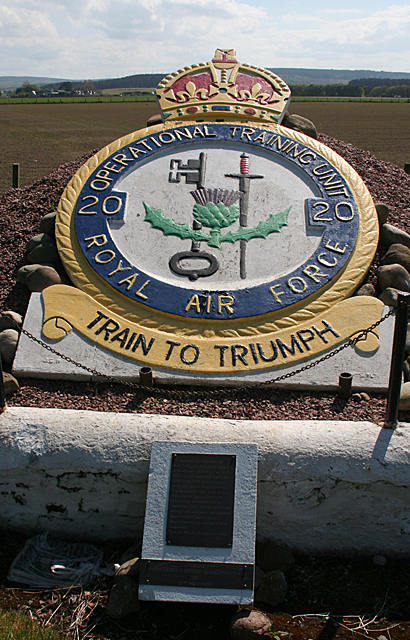
The No. 20 Operational Training Unit memorial at Bogs of Mayne

Flying activity in early 1941 was limited due to the poor condition of the airfield; however, improved weather in the spring saw increased flying activity by No. 20 OTU and No. 46 MU, as well as from continued bomber detachments. Operational sorties were predominantly undertaken by Blenheims of No. 21 Squadron, No. 82 Squadron, No. 110 Squadron and No. 114 Squadron. By the winter of 1941, the airfield had become so muddy that the Wellingtons of No. 20 OTU were temporarily relocated to RAF Lakenheath in Suffolk. The increased activity by No. 46 MU resulted in two satellite landing grounds (SLG) being established to store aircraft off-site. These were at RAF Black Isle (No. 42 SLG), where Bristol Beaufighters were kept and RAF Leanach (No. 43 SLG) near Culloden, where Hurricanes and Supermarine Spitfires were stored.

Lossiemouth was used during 1942 as a base to launch several unsuccessful missions to sink the German battleship Tirpitz, which at the time was operating in Norwegian fjords. The first missions were undertaken in January 1942 by a detachment of thirteen Short Stirlings of No. 15 Squadron and No. 149 Squadron and thirteen Handley Page Halifaxes of No. 10 Squadron and No. 76 Squadron. Further attempts were made during April by Avro Lancasters of No. 44 Squadron and No. 97 Squadron and Halifaxes of No. 10 Squadron. Lancasters of No. 9 Squadron later joined the operation. 1942 also saw numerous accidents involving No. 20 OTU aircraft, many of which resulted in death and serious injuries. These accidents were attributed to a combination of fatigued aircraft, inexperienced crews and poor weather. Wellingtons of No. 20 OTU were also involved in strategic bombing raids on German cities throughout 1942, the training aircraft being required to help reach the target number of 1,000 bombers per raid.

The airfield's first surfaced runways, (06/24 5,997 ft (1,828 m); 09/27 4,498 ft (1,371 m); 01/19 4,200 ft (1,280 m)), were constructed by an engineering battalion of the US Army Air Force in late 1942 and helped to reduce interruptions to flying as a result of the grass strips being affected by poor weather. A new control tower was also constructed.

In September 1943, Wellingtons of No. 20 OTU's 'C' Flight moved to the second of the Lossiemouth satellite airfields, RAF Milltown, located 3 miles (4.8 km) to the south-east. By 1943, maintenance work by 46 MU concentrated on Bristol Beaufighters and Lancasters. The SLG at RAF Leanach had been replaced with a new site at Dornoch golf course, which became known as RAF Dornoch (No. 40 SLG).

No. 20 OTU received its official crest in 1943, with two examples cast in concrete being constructed at Lossiemouth and RAF Elgin. The crest at Lossiemouth no longer exists, and although little now remains of the airfield at Elgin, the concrete crest is a war memorial for those who served there.

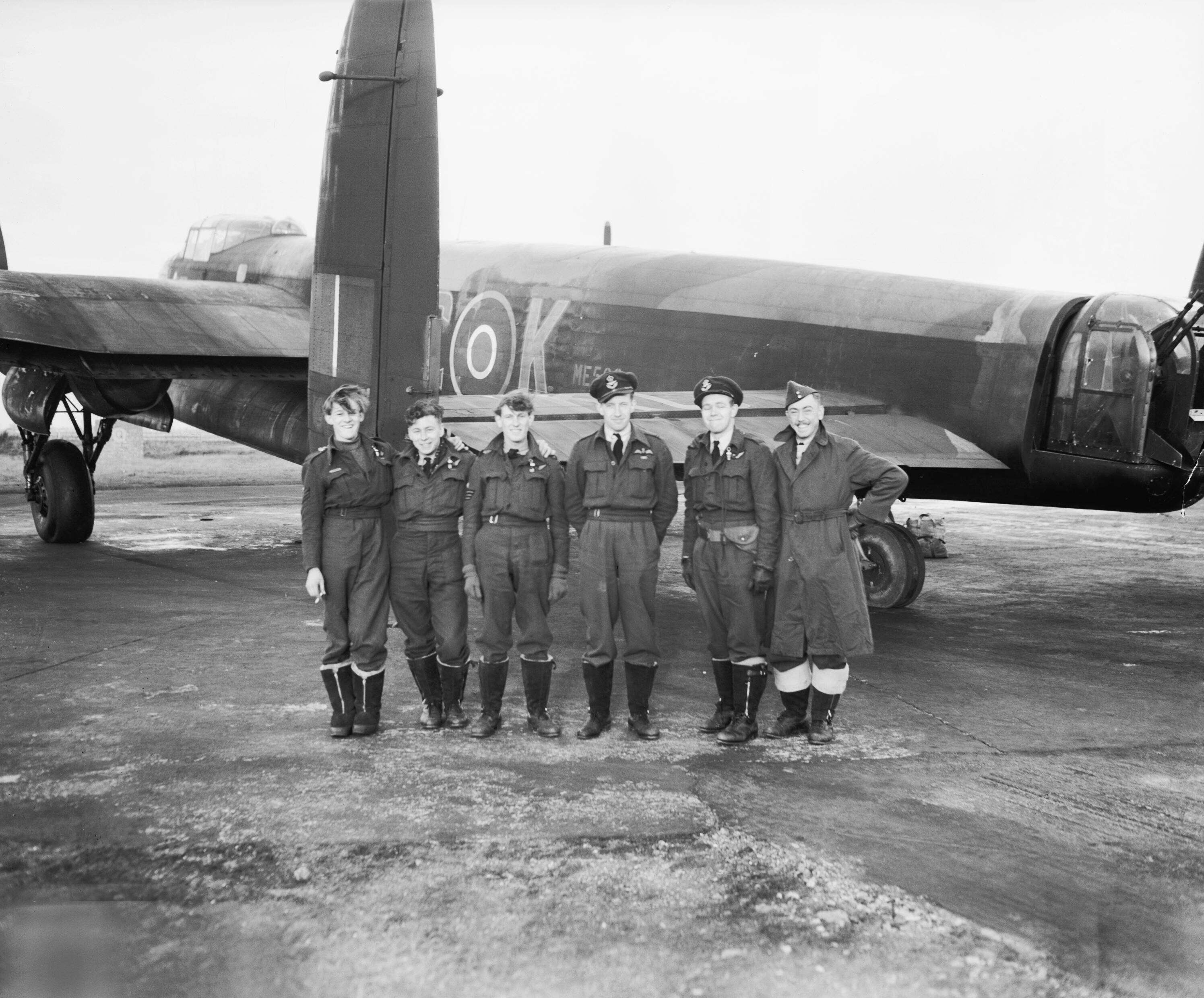
A No. 617 Squadron crew and their Lancaster bomber following the successful operation launched from Lossiemouth against the German battleship Tirpitz on 12 November 1944

Further operations against Tirpitz took place between September and November 1944. Operation Catechism finally resulted in the battleship being sunk near Tromsø on 12 November 1944. Thirty-eight Lancasters of No. 9 Squadron and No. 617 Squadron launched from Lossiemouth, Kinloss and Milltown and destroyed the vessel with Tallboy bombs. Nearly 50 years later, No. 617 Squadron transferred to Lossiemouth and was based there between 1993 and 2014. During that time, examples of the Tallboy, Grand Slam and Up Keep (bouncing bomb) were on display within the squadron site.

In July 1945, after the end of hostilities in Europe, No. 20 OTU was disbanded, and No. 46 MU continued to prepare aircraft for operations in the Far East. After the war ended, No. 46 MU began the enormous task of breaking up surplus aircraft for scrap. At one point, there were around 900 aircraft on the airfield awaiting disposal. On 28 July 1945, Lossiemouth was transferred to No. 17 Group of RAF Coastal Command, with the arrival of No. 111 (Coastal) Operational Training Unit from the Bahamas occurring shortly thereafter. By August 1945, the unit was operating forty-one Consolidated Liberators, ten Halifaxes and a North American Mitchell. The unit was disbanded in July 1946.

=== HMS Fulmar (1946–1972) ===
Lossiemouth transferred from the Royal Air Force to the Fleet Air Arm (FAA) on 2 July 1946 and became known as Royal Naval Air Station (RNAS) Lossiemouth or HMS Fulmar. On the FAA taking control, No. 46 MU moved to RAF Elgin. Lossiemouth was used as a basic training station for FAA pilots who then moved on to RNAS Culdrose (HMS Seahawk) in Cornwall for instrument training. RAF Milltown also transferred to the FAA and became known as HMS Fulmar II. It operated as a Deck Landing Training School, where students carried out the last stage of training before landing on aircraft carrier HMS Theseus in the Moray Firth. The first FAA squadron, No. 766 Naval Air Squadron, arrived at Lossiemouth in August 1946 and operated Supermarine Seafires and Fairey Fireflies until its departure to RNAS Culdrose in 1953. In the late 1940s, to replace poor quality war-era facilities, seven hundred new married living-quarters were constructed in the nearby towns of Lossiemouth and Elgin, with the first opening in September 1949. The practice of constructing living-quarters off-station differed from that of the RAF, which typically constructed such accommodation within the boundaries of their airfields. In 1952 and early 1953, Lossiemouth's runways were upgraded and extended to their present lengths; during that time aircraft temporarily operated from Milltown.

The Naval Air Fighter and Strike Training School transferred to the station in 1953 and over the next decade a wide range of aircraft types operated from Lossiemouth in the training role, including Supermarine Seafires, Fairey Fireflys, Hawker Sea Hawks, Hawker Sea Furys, Supermarine Scimitars, de Havilland Sea Venoms and Hawker Hunters. Four Gloster Meteors were used as target-towers. One of the first squadrons of the recently established Federal Germany Navy was formed at Lossiemouth in May 1958 under the NATO cooperative policy. No. 764 Naval Air Squadron was responsible for training German crews on twelve Sea Hawks, which operated in German Navy markings. A commissioning ceremony was attended by British and German naval and political figures. In 1958, it was announced that station facilities were to be upgraded for £3 million, including the refurbishment of living accommodation and the creation of the Fulmar Club social club. Princess Alexandra opened a new officers mess in July 1965.

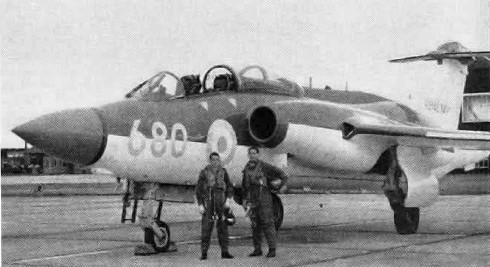
A Buccaneer S.1 of No. 700Z Squadron at RNAS Lossiemouth circa 1961

The Blackburn Buccaneer arrived in March 1961 when No. 700Z Naval Air Squadron was created as an Intensive Flying Trials unit to evaluate the aircraft's weapons, systems and performance. Initially, the squadron operated two aircraft, increasing to five by the end of 1961. The first operational Buccaneer squadron, No. 801 Naval Air Squadron, was established on 17 July 1962, followed by No. 809 Naval Air Squadron in January 1963 and No. 800 Naval Air Squadron in March 1964. The Buccaneer was capable of delivering nuclear weapons as well as conventional weapons for anti-shipping warfare and was typically active over the North Sea during its service. Buccaneers also embarked on aircraft carriers HMS Victorious, Eagle, Ark Royal and Hermes. On 28 March 1967, Buccaneers from Lossiemouth bombed the shipwrecked supertanker Torrey Canyon off the western coast of Cornwall, to ignite the oil and avoid an environmental disaster. The mid-1960s saw further investment in facilities at Lossiemouth, including new living quarters and messes.

The 1966 Defence White Paper saw the withdrawal of most British military forces stationed East of Suez during the 1970s, reducing the need for aircraft carriers and fixed-wing naval aviation such as the Buccaneer. The aircraft had been considered by the RAF for a medium-range interdictor and tactical strike aircraft. As a result, No. 736 Naval Air Squadron began training RAF air and ground crews on the Buccaneer in 1969. Between September 1967 and March 1970, the Fleet Air Arm's most decorated pilot, Captain Eric 'Winkle' Brown was station commander; it was his last command. The late 1960s saw the FAA reduce its activities at Lossiemouth, although Fairey Gannets of No. 849 Naval Air Squadron were transferred from RNAS Brawdy to Lossiemouth on 13 November 1971. The Buccaneer force was reduced in size with several squadrons departing or disbanding in the late 1960s and early 1970s. The last Buccaneers, of No. 809 Naval Air Squadron, left on 25 September 1972, leaving the only Fleet Air Arm aircraft left being the Gannets and search and rescue helicopters.

=== Return of the Royal Air Force (1972–1991) ===
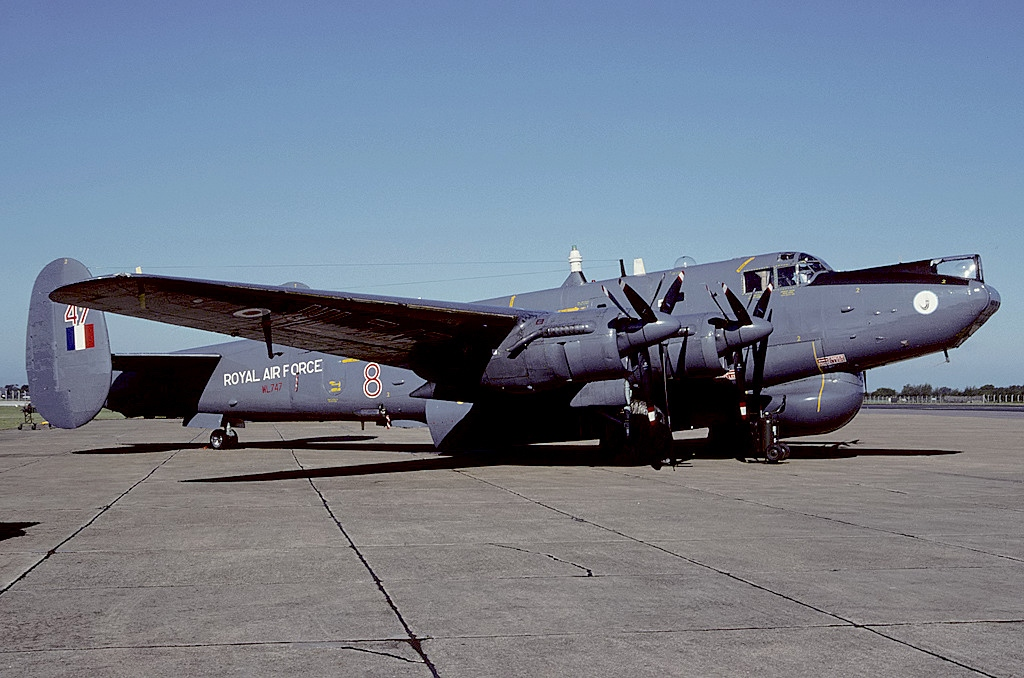
A Shackleton AEW.2 of No. 8 Squadron which was based at Lossiemouth from 1973 to 1991

The station was returned to Royal Air Force control on 28 September 1972, with the first RAF squadron operating from the new RAF Lossiemouth being 'D' Flight of No. 202 Squadron in the helicopter search and rescue role. The Jaguar Conversion Team arrived in May 1973 to train the RAF's first SEPECAT Jaguar crews. It was later designated No. 226 Operational Conversion Unit on 1 October 1974. By late 1974, No. 6 Squadron and No. 54 Squadron were both operating the Jaguar.

In August 1973, No. 8 Squadron, which operated the Avro Shackleton AEW.2, moved to Lossiemouth from nearby RAF Kinloss. The squadron's twelve Shackletons operated in the airborne early warning (AEW) role and were an interim solution for the UK's AEW requirement. The Shackleton gradually replaced the Fleet Air Arm's Fairey Gannets, culminating in the disbandment of No. 849 Naval Air Squadron in November 1978. Towards the end of the 1970s, two non-flying defence units took up residence at the station, with No. 48 Squadron RAF Regiment equipped with Rapier surface-to-air missiles arriving in December 1978 and the formation of No. 2622 (Highland) Royal Air Force Auxiliary Regiment in the ground defence occurring in July 1979. From 1978 to 1980, No. 2 Tactical Weapons Unit operated the Hawker Hunter from Lossiemouth.

The Buccaneer made a return to Lossiemouth in the 1980s as an RAF maritime strike aircraft, the first arriving in November 1980 when No. 12 Squadron transferred from RAF Honington in Suffolk, followed by No. 208 Squadron in July 1983. The RAF Buccaneer fleet was consolidated at Lossiemouth in October 1984 when No. 237 Operational Conversion Unit (OCU) arrived. Although the training unit for the Buccaneer, No. 237 OCU also had a reserve role of overland laser designation in support of RAF Jaguars.

=== Operation Granby ===
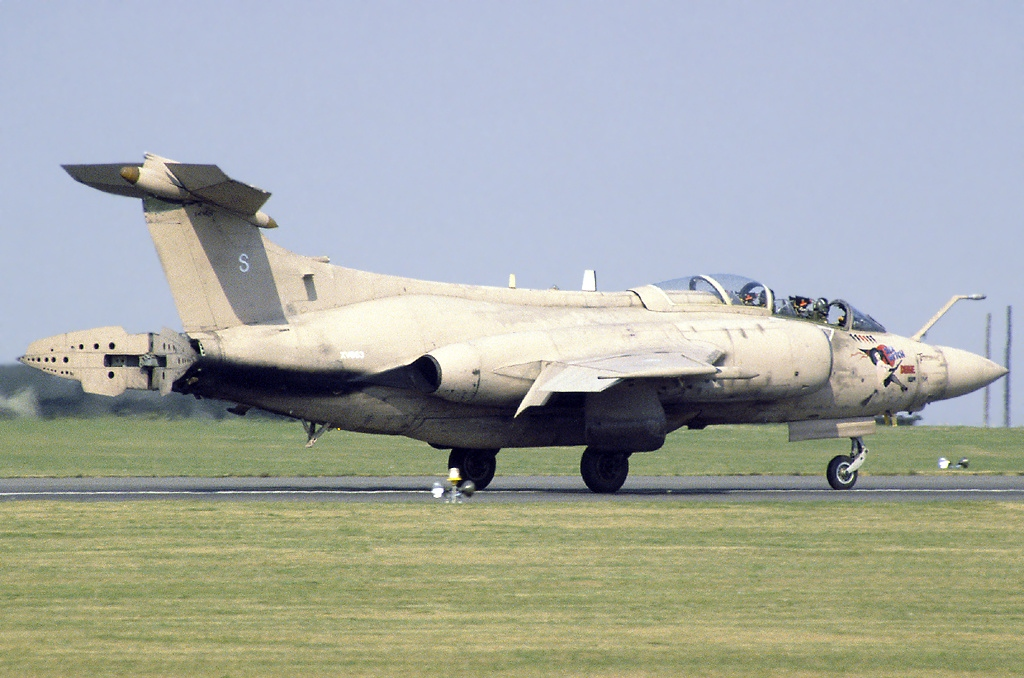
A Buccaneer S.2B in Gulf War colours

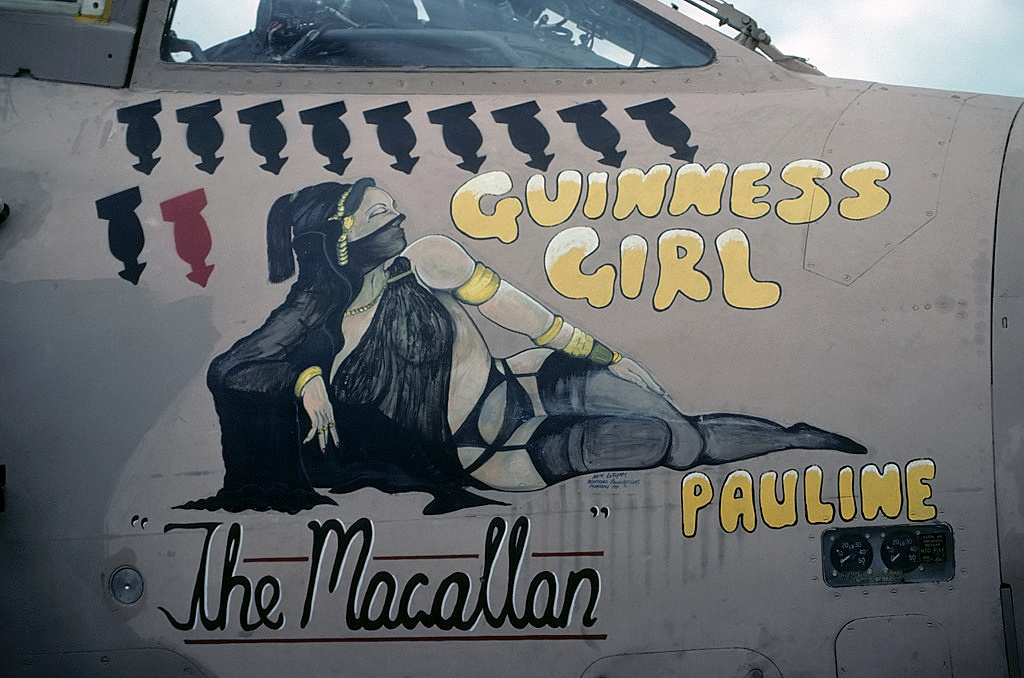
Gulf War nose art on a Buccaneer S.2B

During the 1991 Gulf War, personnel from all three Buccaneer squadrons took part in Operation Granby, the aircraft's first combat operation. Following a short-notice decision to deploy to the Middle East, the first batch of six aircraft were brought to readiness in under 72 hours, including the adoption of desert-pink paint scheme and additional war-time equipment. The first six aircraft departed from Lossiemouth for Muharraq in Bahrain at 04:00 on 26 January 1991. Twelve Buccaneers operated as laser designators, and it became common for each attack formation to comprise four Tornados and two Buccaneers; each Buccaneer carrying a Pave Spike laser targeting pod, one as a spare in case of equipment failure. The Buccaneer force became known as the 'Sky Pirates' in reference to the maritime history of the Buccaneer. Each aircraft had a Jolly Roger flag painted on its port side, alongside nose art featuring female characters. In recognition of their Scottish roots, the Buccaneers were also named after Speyside whisky such as Glenfiddich, Glen Elgin and The Macallan. Hostilities ended in late February 1991, the Buccaneers having flown 218 sorties without loss, designating targets for other aircraft and later dropping 48 of their own Paveway II laser-guided bombs.

=== Transition to Tornado (1991–1999) ===
The replacement for the ageing Shackleton AEW.2, the British Aerospace Nimrod AEW.3, suffered considerable development difficulties which culminated in the aircraft being cancelled during 1986. The RAF instead opted for an off-the-shelf purchase of the Boeing Sentry AEW1. The last Shackletons were retired in July 1991, and No. 8 Squadron transferred to RAF Waddington in Lincolnshire, to equip with their new aircraft.

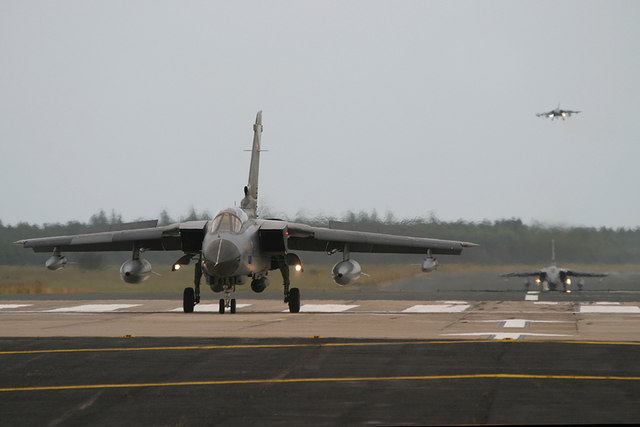
Several Tornado GR4 landing at RAF Lossiemouth

It was intended that the Buccaneer would remain in service until the end of the 1990s, having been extensively modernised in a process lasting up to 1989; however, the end of the Cold War resulted in major changes in British defence policy, with many aircraft being deemed surplus to requirements. As a consequence, to allow for the early retirement of the Buccaneer, twenty-six Panavia Tornados were modified from GR1 to GR1B variant to enable the use of the BAe Sea Eagle missile for maritime strike operations. The reduction of the Buccaneer fleet began on 1 October 1991 when No. 237 OCU was disbanded, followed by No. 12 Squadron in September 1993. No. 27 Squadron, then at RAF Marham, disbanded and re-formed at Lossiemouth as No.12 Squadron, operating the Tornado GR1B.

In 1992, No. 237 Field Squadron of the Territorial Army was formed with responsibility for Airfield Damage Repair (ADR). This squadron became part of No. 76 Engineer Regiment (Volunteers) of the Royal Engineers, responsible for ADR in the north of England and across Scotland. The Tornado Weapons Conversion Unit, renamed No. 15 (Reserve) Squadron, arrived from RAF Honington in Suffolk on 1 November 1993. The last Buccaneers were withdrawn in April 1994 when No. 208 Squadron disbanded. No. 617 Squadron then transferred to Lossiemouth from RAF Marham in Norfolk, with the Tornado GR1B. No. 48 Squadron RAF Regiment and their Rapiers left Lossiemouth for RAF Honington on 1 July 1996. Group Captain Graham Miller was station commander between 1995 and 1998 and later achieved the rank of Air Marshal, holding the post of Deputy Commander at Allied Joint Force Command in Naples from 2004 until his retirement in 2008.

After the closure of the Tri-National Tornado Training Establishment (TTTE) at RAF Cottesmore in 1999, the number of aircraft operated by No. 15 (R) Squadron increased. The squadron became the RAF Tornado GR4 Operational Conversion Unit, training pilots and weapon systems operators before posting to front-line Tornado squadrons at Lossiemouth and RAF Marham. The squadron accepted aircrew straight from advanced flying training at RAF Leeming and RAF Valley to provide refresher courses for experienced aircrew returning to the Tornado GR4, following other tours of duty. The squadron also trained aircrew officers from foreign nations posted to the UK on two to three-year exchange tours.

=== 21st century ===
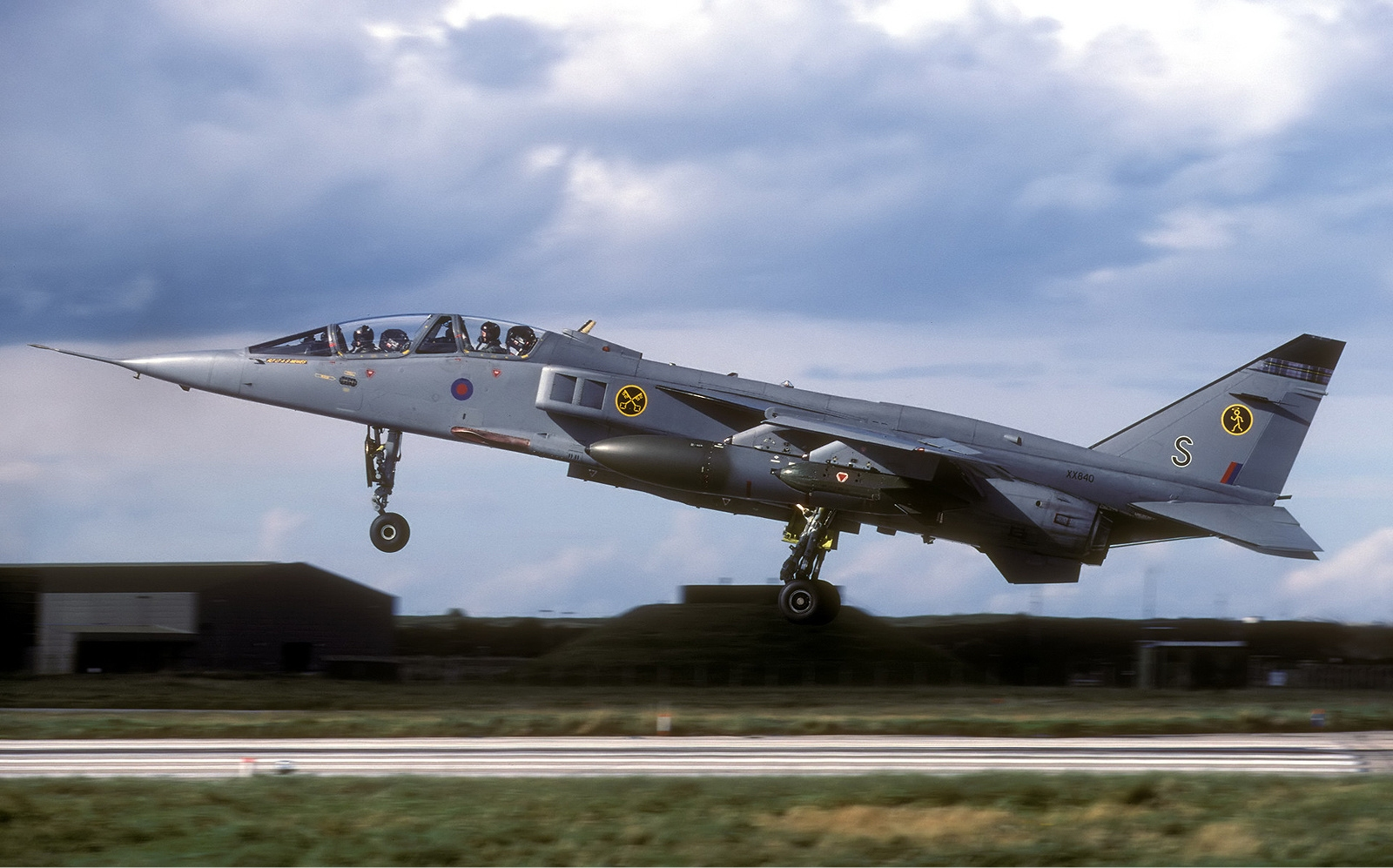
A SEPECAT Jaguar T4 of No. 16(R) Squadron landing at Lossiemouth

To consolidate the Jaguar fleet in one location, No. 16(R) Squadron with eleven aircraft and around 100 personnel departed Lossiemouth for RAF Coltishall in Norfolk in July 2000, bringing to an end Lossiemouth's 27-year association with the Jaguar. No. 14 Squadron operating the Tornado GR1 arrived from RAF Brüggen in Germany during January 2001, making Lossiemouth the busiest RAF fast-jet station. In May 2001, No. 51 Squadron RAF Regiment was re-established, to join No. 2622 RAuxAF Squadron, under the new No. 5 Force Protection Wing Headquarters.

==== F-35 Lightning II and threat of closure ====
The Ministry of Defence (MOD) announced in November 2005 that Lossiemouth would be the main operating base for the RAF's new F-35 Lightning II fleet, which was expected to enter service in 2013. In 2010, the Strategic Defence and Security Review cast doubt on whether the F-35 would be based at Lossiemouth raising fears in the local community that the station could close. Up to 7,000 people, including Scotland's First Minister Alex Salmond and other politicians, took part in a march and rally in Lossiemouth on 7 November 2010 in support of retaining the RAF station. The local economy was heavily dependent on military spending. It was feared the closure of the station combined with the confirmed closure of nearby RAF Kinloss, would lead to economic uncertainty and unemployment. A petition with more than 30,000 signatures was delivered to 10 Downing Street by campaign members on 11 January 2011.

In July 2011, the MOD announced that Lossiemouth would remain open, with the Tornados moving to RAF Marham. RAF Leuchars in Fife would close and transfer to the British Army, with Leuchar's Eurofighter Typhoon FGR4s and responsibility for Quick Reaction Alert (Interceptor) North (QRA) moving to Lossiemouth. In March 2013, the MOD confirmed that the F-35 would be based at Marham.

==== From Tornado to Typhoon ====
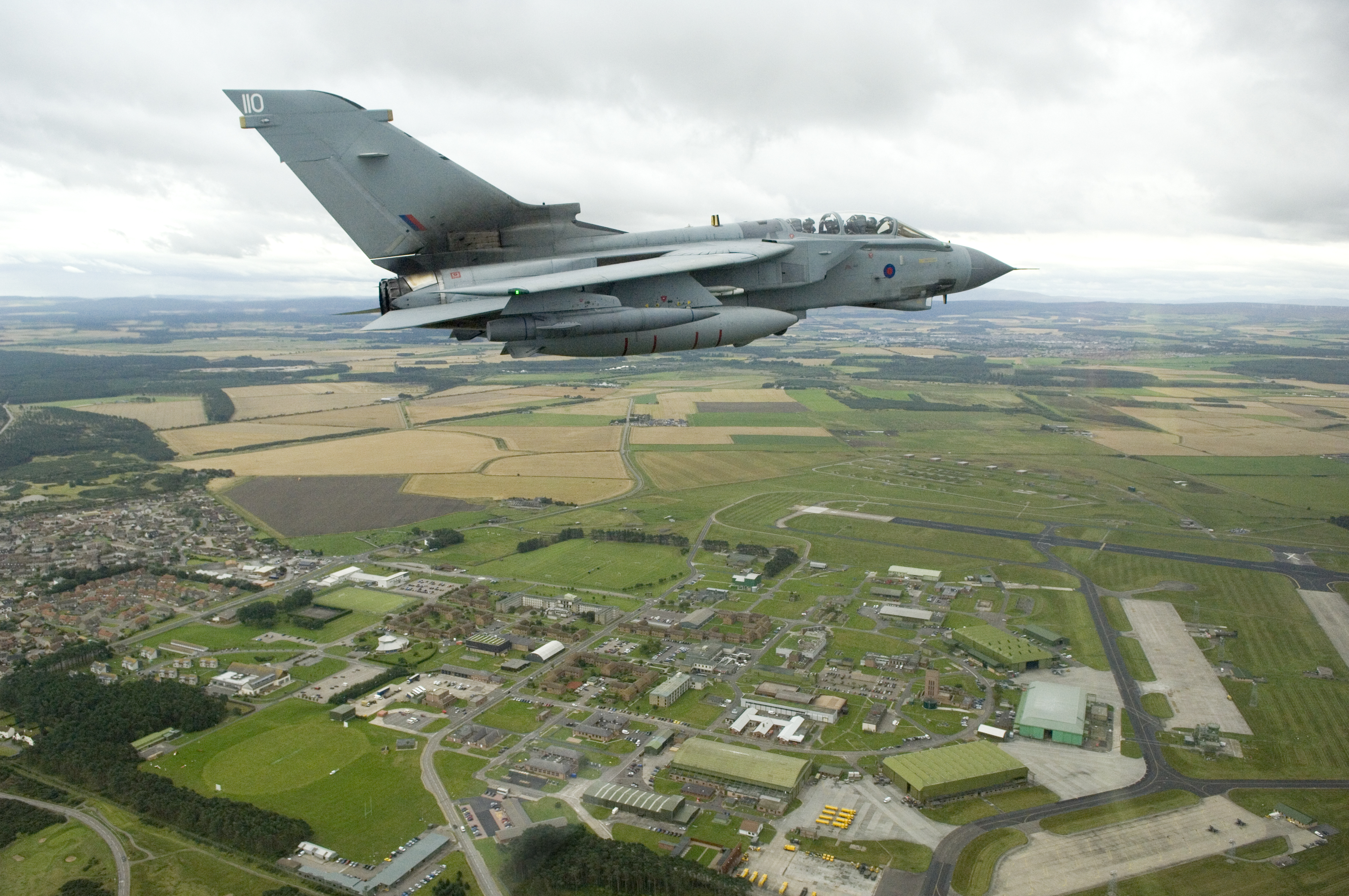
A Tornado GR4 of No. 617 Squadron over RAF Lossiemouth during 2009

After the Strategic Defence and Security Review, No. 14 Squadron disbanded on 1 June 2011, reducing the number of Tornados based at Lossiemouth. In 2012, a new combined mess for junior ranks and senior non-commission officers was completed, replacing separate buildings constructed in the 1960s, which were demolished.

Following the announcement in 2011 that Lossiemouth would remain open, £17 million was spent in 2013 refurbishing the airfield for the arrival of the Typhoon, with a further £70 million set aside for future developments. Quick Reaction Alert facilities were built in the northern hardened aircraft shelter (HAS) complex; alterations were made to hangars 1 and 3; and new ground-support IT and communication systems installed. In March 2014, three Typhoons from RAF Leuchars arrived at Lossiemouth to take part in Exercise Moray Venture, a week-long operation to test new facilities ahead of the aircraft's arrival later that year.

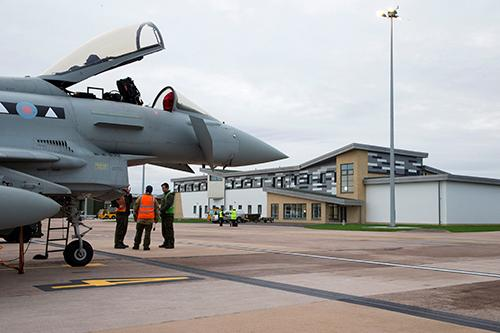
The No. 2 (AC) Squadron building with a Eurofighter Typhoon on the flight-line

In preparation for the transition to the Typhoon, No.12 Squadron and No.617 Squadron disbanded on 1 April 2014, leaving No.15 (R) Squadron as the only remaining Tornado unit at Lossiemouth. The first Typhoon unit, No. 6 Squadron, transferred from RAF Leuchars to Lossiemouth on 20 June 2014. Nine aircraft arrived in formation in the shape of a number 6. No. 1 Squadron followed on 8 September 2014, when responsibility for Quick Reaction Alert (North) was transferred from RAF Leuchars to Lossiemouth.

The third Typhoon squadron based at Lossiemouth, No. 2 Squadron, arrived in January 2015. In preparation of the squadron's arrival, work commenced in October 2014 to refurbish the southern HAS complex, which was formerly occupied by No. 617 Squadron. Nine aircraft shelters were refurbished, a hard-standing for a flight-line capable of accommodating eight aircraft was built, new floodlighting was installed, and the dining facilities improved. A headquarters building was constructed on the site of a Second World War-era K-type hangar (K20). The building accommodates engineering and logistics facilities, a survival equipment section, classrooms and office space. This allowed No. 2 Squadron to operate independently from other squadrons at Lossiemouth.

In May 2015, construction began on a new 250 m × 16 m (273 yd × 17 yd) section of taxiway to provide improved access between the QRA facilities in the northern HAS site and runway 23/05. The new taxiway was constructed by 53 Field Squadron, part of 39 (Air Support) Engineer Regiment, Royal Engineers, based at nearby Kinloss Barracks. The project was completed in September 2015.

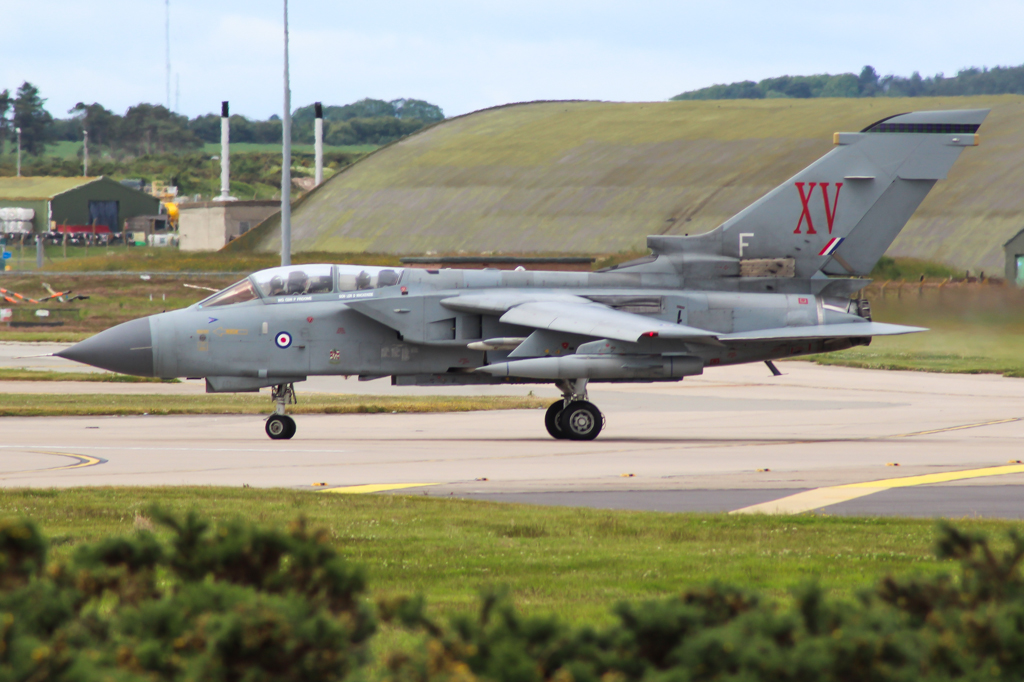
Tornado GR4 ZA602 F 'MacRoberts Reply' of No.15(R) Squadron taxiing at Lossiemouth

No. 15 (R) Squadron disbanded on 31 March 2017. Aircraft and crews were absorbed into front-line squadrons at RAF Marham where refresher training on the Tornado was carried out. To mark the occasion, on 17 March 2017, five Tornados from the squadron carried out a flypast of the Leuchars Station, Tain Air Weapons Range and Aberdeen International Airport, before performing a simulated airfield strike on RAF Lossiemouth in front of base personnel, families and friends. A disbandment parade was held on 31 March 2017, signifying the end of twenty-four years of Tornado operations at Lossiemouth. Over 750 current and former squadron personnel attended the ceremony where the "Sands of Kuwait", a tune written to commemorate the 1991 Gulf War (the squadron's last battle honour), was played on the bagpipes and a Tornado fly-past took place.

The final infrastructure required to support the Typhoons was completed in June 2017, when Rolls-Royce opened its Typhoon Propulsion Support Facility. The facility is operated by a combination of civilian and RAF personnel and provides engineering support for Typhoon Eurojet EJ200 engines.

On 4 March 2016, Lossiemouth was announced as the preferred option to accommodate an additional Typhoon squadron and 400 personnel. Four Typhoons were assigned to No. 9 Squadron (Designate) at Lossiemouth in February 2019. The unit re-equipped as an aggressor and air defence squadron on 1 April 2019, thereby continuing in unbroken service upon the Tornado's retirement at RAF Marham.

==== End of search and rescue (SAR) operations ====
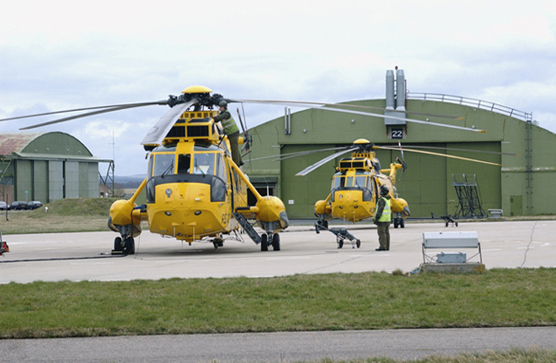
Two 'D' Flight No. 202 Squadron Sea King HAR3 outside their hangar at Lossiemouth

In 2006, the government announced its intentions to privatise the RAF Search and Rescue (SAR) Force. A £1.6 billion ten-year contract to run the search and rescue service with new AgustaWestland AW189 and Sikorsky S-92 helicopters was agreed with Bristow Helicopters in March 2013. SAR helicopter operations ceased at Lossiemouth and moved to Inverness Airport, located 30 miles (48 km) to the west. 'D' flight of No. 202 Squadron disbanded on 1 April 2015, bringing nearly 43 years of search and rescue operations at Lossiemouth to an end. The Sea Kings had been a familiar sight in the skies above Scotland, having been involved in high-profile events such as the Piper Alpha disaster and Lockerbie bombing and regularly appearing in the media.

A farewell party to be held by 'D' Flight personnel to thank the local community for their support was cancelled by RAF officials. There was widespread criticism of the decision but the RAF considered that the event could contravene campaigning rules for the UK general election, as it could be perceived as being political. Morayvia, a local charity bought the former Lossiemouth Sea King 'XZ592' from the Ministry of Defence in March 2015. The aircraft is now on display as part of Morayvia's aviation museum at Kinloss.

In March 2015, the UK government ruled out Lossiemouth as well as nearby RAF Kinloss as candidates for a new spaceport due to opposition from the Ministry of Defence, which cited over-riding operational factors. The decision was criticised by local politicians.

==== Arrival of Poseidon ====
On 23 November 2015, the UK announced its intention to order nine new Boeing MRA1 Poseidon maritime patrol aircraft. In June 2017, it was announced that No. 120 Squadron would be the first Poseidon squadron. The unit reformed in early 2018 and by February 2019 air and ground crews from the unit and the Poseidon Line Squadron had commenced training with the US Navy at Naval Air Station Jacksonville, Florida.

To provide the infrastructure to support the Poseidon, the Defence Infrastructure Organisation launched the Lossiemouth Development Programme in October 2016. The programme involved £350 million being invested in RAF Lossiemouth to upgrade buildings and airfield infrastructure to allow No. 9 Squadron and the Poseidon fleet to operate from Lossiemouth. Projects included:

- Construction of a new hangar and support facility for the Poseidon fleet, known as the Poseidon Strategic Facility, begun in April 2018 and was completed in July 2020. The 33,000 square metres (360,000 sq ft) facility was built on the northern side of the airfield and includes maintenance facilities capable of accommodating three aircraft simultaneously, a tactical operations centre, training & simulation facilities and accommodation for two squadrons. The building was constructed by Robertson Group with a contract value of £132m. In August 2021, it was named the 'Atlantic Building', reflecting its maritime warfare role.
- As Lossiemouth's airfield was largely set up for fast-jet operations, the runways and associated operating surfaces required resurfacing and alterations to safely accommodate regular Poseidon operations. Work on the £75 million contract commenced in May 2020, with the airfield being closed between 10 August and 16 October 2020 whilst the intersection of the two runways was resurfaced. During the closure, routine Typhoon training operations were relocated to the airfield at Kinloss Barracks and the Quick Reaction Alert (QRA) Force for the north of the UK temporarily relocated to Leuchars Station.
- Construction of a new Crash, Fire and Rescue building to replace the existing building dating from the 1960s was completed in November 2022. Alongside the introduction of Oshkosh Striker fire fighting vehicles, the new facilities for the Defence Fire and Rescue Service provide the increased level of emergency cover required by the larger aircraft operating from Lossiemouth.
- Seven new single living accommodation blocks were constructed to provide 426 en-suite bedrooms, with the final block being completed in April 2024. Each block is named after a former RAF airfield in the north east of Scotland: Brackla, Dalcross, Dallachy, Dyce, Inverness, Milltown and Peterhead.
- New waste water treatment plant, drainage and utility infrastructure.

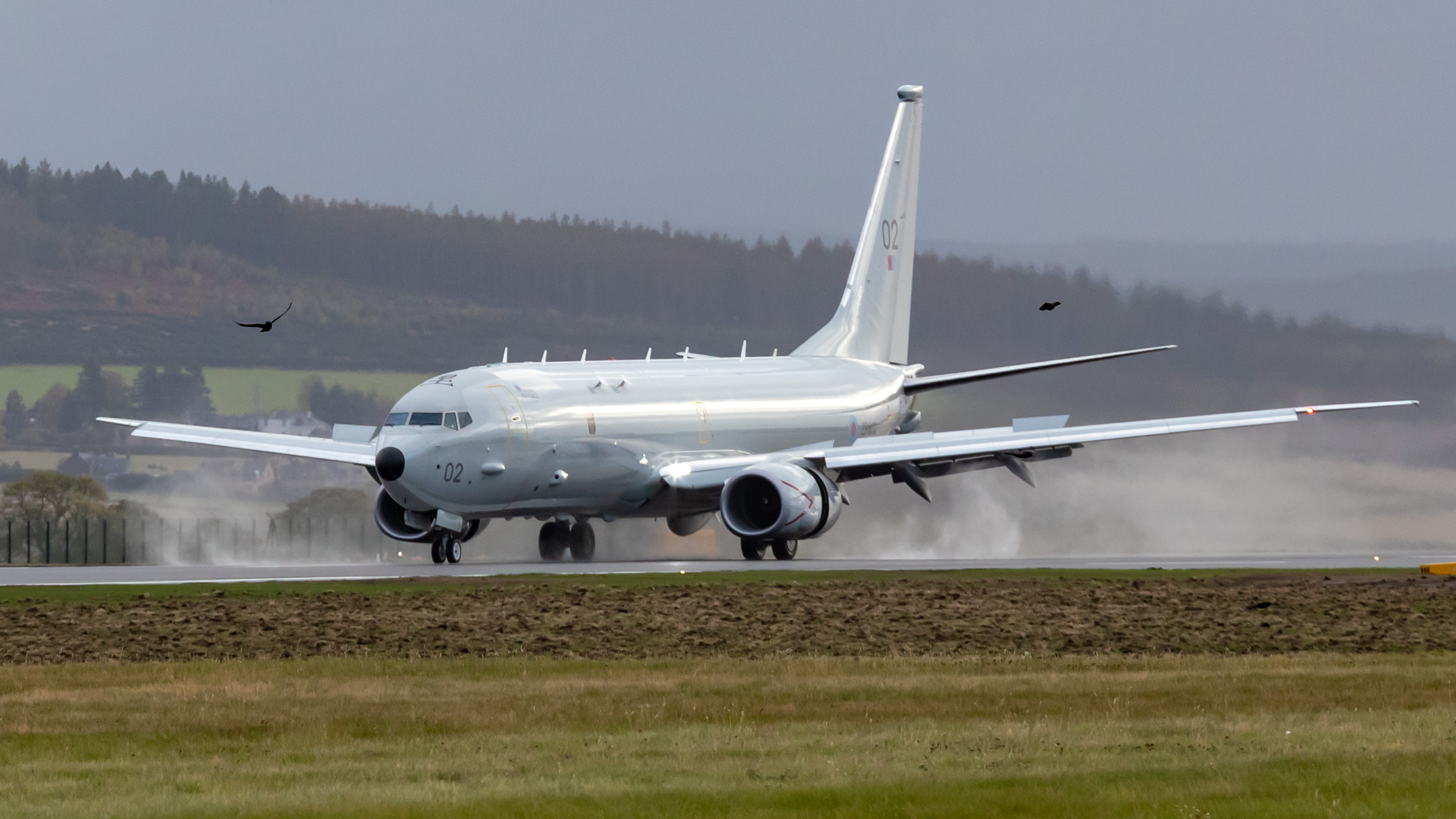
The RAF's second Poseidon MRA1 arrives at Lossiemouth on 13 October 2020

The RAF's first Poseidon arrived in the UK from the US in February 2020, initially operating from Kinloss. It was later joined by a second aircraft before both moved to their new home at Lossiemouth in October 2020. The fleet was completed in January 2022 when the ninth aircraft was delivered to Lossiemouth. No. 201 Squadron reformed at Lossiemouth during 2021 as the second unit operating the Poseidon, sharing the fleet with No. 120 Squadron.

A basing agreement between the UK and US governments was reached in 2017 to allow the US Navy to routinely operate their own Poseidons from Lossiemouth. To facilitate the arrangement, the US Department of Defense contributed £60m ($82m) to the Lossiemouth Development Programme, including towards the runway and apron works. A hangar wash facility and austere barracks for the US Navy were opened in May 2024, which are operated by Commander Task Force 67 (CTF-67), part of the navy's Sixth Fleet.

In October 2024, as part of a wider defence agreement between Germany and the UK, it was announced that German Navy Poesidons will periodically operate from Lossiemouth whilst conducting patrols of the North Atlantic.

The Poseidon Line Squadron was rebadged as No. 203 Squadron in July 2025 to provide line engineering to the Poseidon fleet the Boeing Wedgetail AEW1 once it is introduced into service.

== Facilities ==
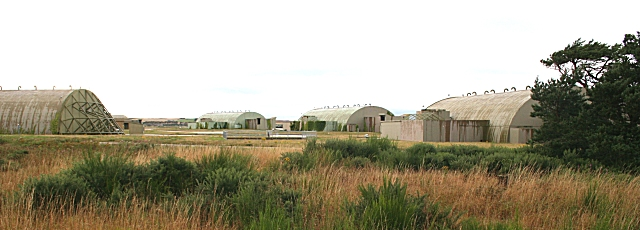
The southern hardened aircraft shelter complex in 2006

The RAF Lossiemouth site extends to 580 ha (1,400 acres) and accommodates two runways, the main runway (05/23) is 2,764 m (9,068 ft; 3,023 yd) long and the secondary runway (10/28) is 1,850 m (6,070 ft; 2,020 yd) long. Hangars at Lossiemouth date from the Second World War and consist of three C-type, one J-type, six L-type, four K-type and a Bellman type. The northern HAS complex has nine shelters and QRA facilities and the southern complex has a further nine shelters. Both HAS complexes were constructed in the 1970s.

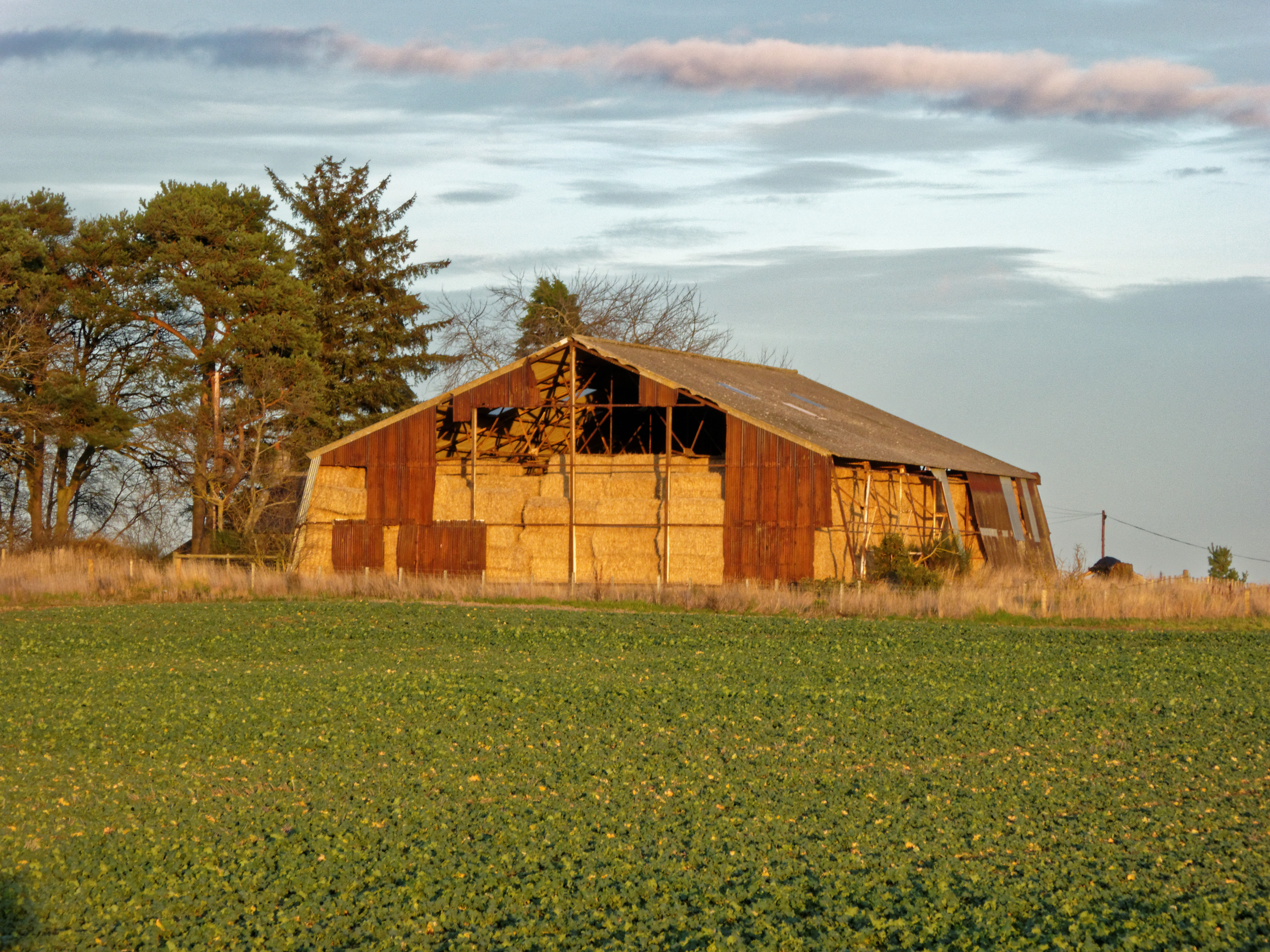
Former Super Robin hangar now in agricultural use at Silverhills Farm.

The airfield boundary has changed over the years, and several former Super Robin hangars, dating from the Second World War are outside the current airfield boundary, although they are no longer in military use. An example is within the grounds of Gordonstoun School. Former airfield dispersals are also evident in the same vicinity. During the Second World War the airfield was defended with eight pillboxes, at least six of them Type 27 pillboxes, one rectangular and the other Type 22 or Type 24.

BAE Systems operates the Typhoon Training Facility (North), which is home to four Emulated Deployable Cockpit Trainer (EDCT) flight simulators. The expansion of the facility from two to four EDCTs was completed in April 2018. During the Tornado's tenure at Lossiemouth, the station was home to two Tornado GR4 flight simulators, operated by Thales UK.

Aviation fuel is supplied to Lossiemouth through a 40.6 mi (65.3 km)-stretch of the CLH Pipeline System which connects the airfield to a fuel depot in Inverness.

== Role and operations ==
RAF Lossiemouth's mission statement is "Sustain Quick Reaction Alert (Interceptor) North and deliver global operations".

The Engineering & Logistics Wing is responsible for providing engineering support and supply, including weapons and survival equipment on aircraft. It is also responsible for the maintenance and repair of aircraft not currently in service on squadrons, and the station support equipment and vehicles. The Operations Wing plans and controls all flying and major exercises on station and manages all activities that have a direct impact on flying operations. This includes intelligence gathering, weather forecasting and communications systems. The Base Support Wing manages all support functions for the station's infrastructure and personnel, such as health and safety, medical centre, non-flying training, accommodation, family support and the deployment of Station personnel.

Moray Flight of No. 602 (City of Glasgow) Squadron (Royal Auxiliary Air Force) was established in 2013 to support NATO maritime patrol aircraft and the UK Maritime Air Operations Centre when deployed to Lossiemouth. The unit is also supporting the introduction of the P-8A Poseidon at Lossiemouth.

RAF Lossiemouth is the parent station of Tain Air Weapons Range which is located approximately 40 kilometres (25 mi) to the north west.

With the closure of nearby RAF Kinloss and the transfer of the station to the British Army in July 2012, the RAF Kinloss Mountain Rescue Team (MRT) became the RAF Lossiemouth MRT. The team continued to operate from their purpose-built base at Kinloss Barracks for over two years, until they moved into a 'D' Flight No. 202 Squadron hangar in February 2015.

=== Command ===
Group Captain Sarah Brewin was appointed as the Station Commander of RAF Lossiemouth on 19 July 2024, taking over from Group Captain Jim Lee.

In July 2017, a spaniel named Dee was made the official station mascot and given the rank of Sergeant. Dee is a former RAF Police working dog and specialised in explosives detection. He retired from operational duties when his leg was amputated as a result of an injury.

=== Typhoon operations ===
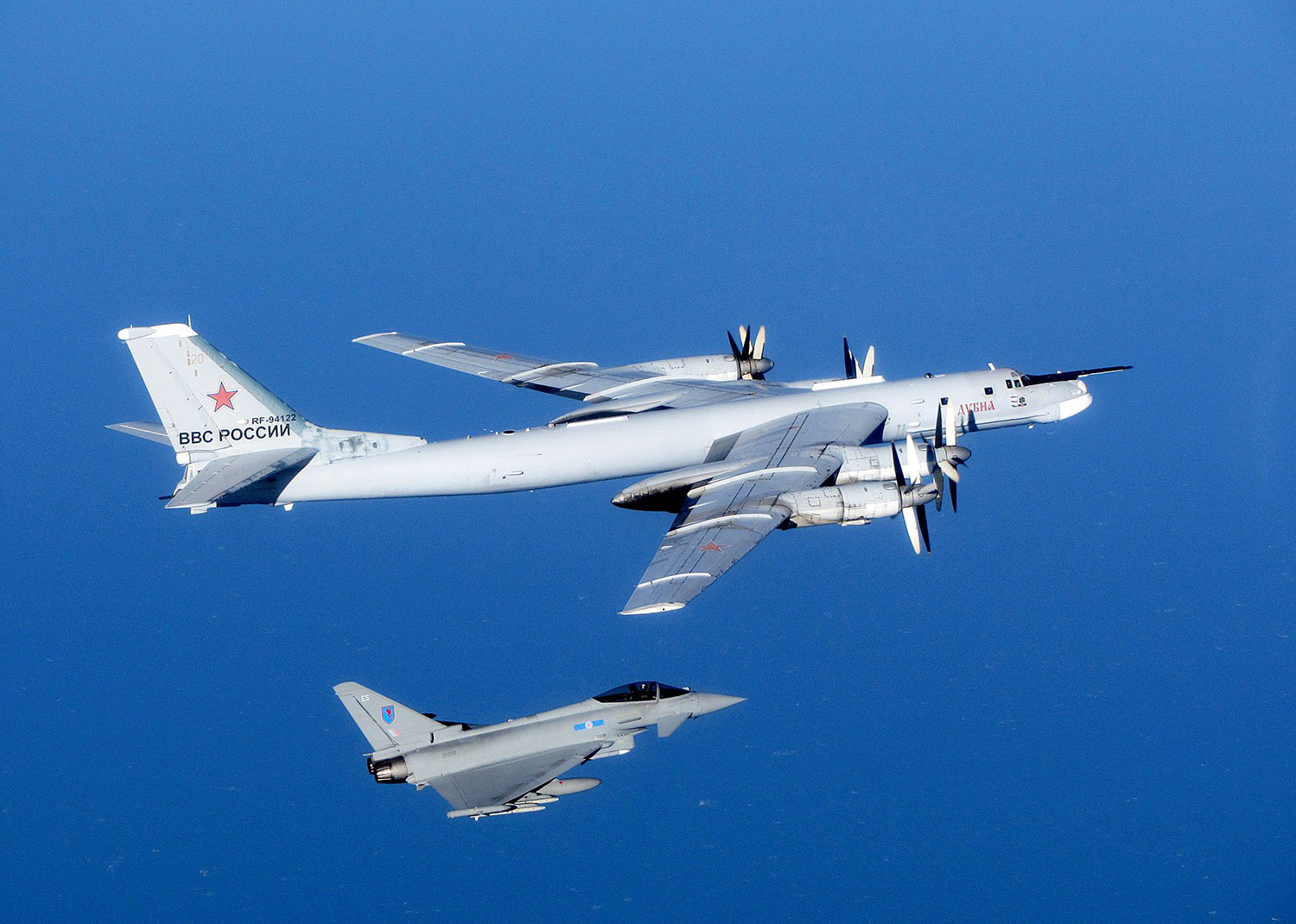
A No. 6 Squadron Typhoon FGR4 intercepts a Russian Air Force Tupolev Tu-95 'Bear'

The Typhoon FGR4 provides the RAF with a multi-role combat capability for air policing, peace support and high-intensity conflict. Lossiemouth Typhoon squadrons have operated against ISIS in Iraq and Syria as part of Operation Shader and have participated in the NATO Baltic Air Policing mission where they operated from Ämari air base in Estonia.

Lossiemouth's four Typhoon squadrons are responsible for maintaining the Quick Reaction Alert (Interceptor) North mission (QRA(I)N). Aircraft and crews are held at a high state of readiness, 24 hours a day, 365 days a year, to respond to unidentified aircraft approaching UK airspace. QRA missions range from civilian airliners which have stopped responding to air traffic control, to intercepting Russian aircraft such as the Tupolev Tu-95 Bear and Tu-160 Blackjack.

=== No. 5 Force Protection Wing ===
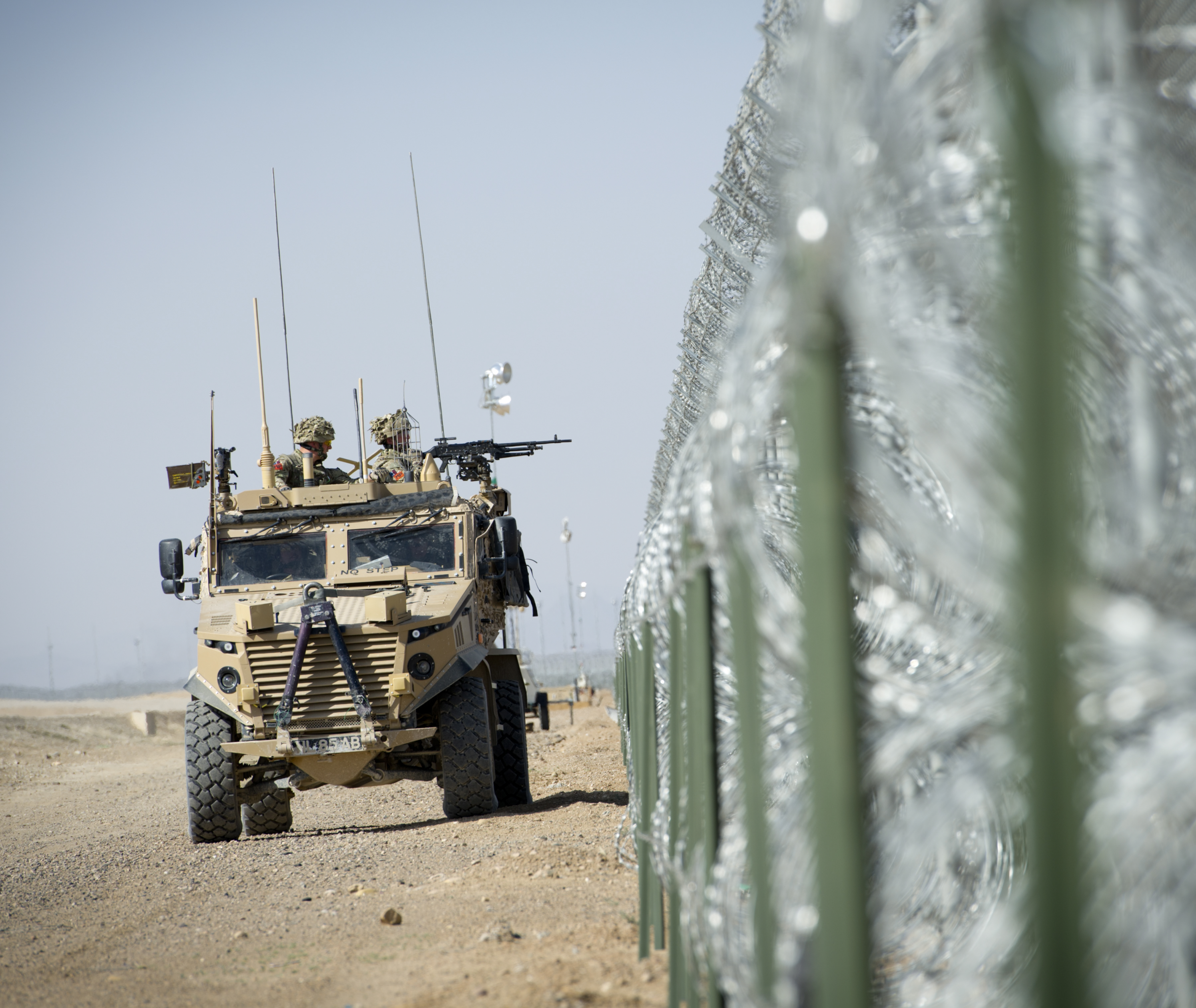
No. 51 Squadron RAF Regiment Foxhound vehicle on patrol at the perimeter of Camp Bastion, Afghanistan in 2014

No. 5 Force Protection Wing HQ provides operational planning, command and control to two RAF Regiment field squadrons attached to the wing, No. 51 Squadron RAF Regiment and No. 2622 (Highland) Squadron (RAuxAF), whose purpose is to protect RAF bases at home and abroad from ground attack. No. 2622 Squadron consists primarily of RAF Regiment gunners, also trained as infantry and has a limited number of personnel in support duties. The unit provides officers and gunners to supplement the regular RAF Regiment on overseas operations and exercises. It is the only squadron in the RAF or RAuxAF to have its own Pipes and Drums band, which was formed in 1999 and is open to both Service and civilian members. It is also the only operational squadron to have spent its existence based at Lossiemouth. Both squadrons have seen action on Operation Telic in Iraq and Operation Herrick in Afghanistan, with No. 51 Squadron also involved in Operation Shader against ISIS.

No. 4 RAF Police Squadron also falls under the command of the wing and has responsibility for policing and security in Scotland and northern England.

=== Air Training Corps – North Scotland Wing ===
Lossiemouth is home to the North Scotland Wing of the Air Training Corps. A new Air Cadet Regional Centre was opened in October 2014, housing the Highland Wing headquarters, activity centre with a flight simulator, radio communications training room, IT Suite and several briefing rooms. Overnight residential accommodation for 48 cadets and 8 adult staff is also provided. The centre was named after and opened by retired Group Captain Phil Dacre.

== Based units ==
Flying and notable non-flying units based at RAF Lossiemouth.

=== Royal Air Force ===
No. 1 Group

- Combat Air Force
  - No. 1 Squadron – Typhoon FGR4
  - No. 2 Squadron – Typhoon FGR4
  - No. 6 Squadron – Typhoon FGR4
  - No. 9 Squadron – Typhoon FGR4
- ISTAR Force
  - ISTAR Air Wing
    - No. 8 Squadron – Wedgetail AEW1 (from 2026)
    - No. 42 (TB) Squadron - Poseidon MRA1 & Wedgetail AEW1 (OCU)
    - No. 120 Squadron – Poseidon MRA1
    - No. 201 Squadron – Poseidon MRA1
    - No. 203 Squadron – Poseidon and Wedgetail line engineering
    - Poseidon Tactical Operations Centre (TOC)

No. 2 Group

- Air Security Force
  - No. 2 RAF Police & Security Wing
    - No. 4 RAF Police (Typhoon) Squadron Headquarters
- Combat and Readiness Force
  - No. 5 RAF Force Protection Wing
    - No. 5 Force Protection Wing Headquarters
    - No. 51 Squadron RAF Regiment
    - No. 2622 (Highland) Squadron Royal Auxiliary Air Force Regiment
- Support Force
  - 85 Expeditionary Logistics Wing
    - RAF Lossiemouth Mountain Rescue Team
- RAF Music Services
  - RAF Lossiemouth Voluntary Band

No. 22 (Training) Group RAF

- Air Training Corps – Highland Wing Headquarters

== Future ==
=== E-7 Wedgetail ===
In December 2020, the RAF announced that its new fleet of Boeing E-7 Wedgetail AEW1 aircraft were to be based at Lossiemouth. The Airborne early warning and control aircraft will replace the E-3D Sentry AEW1 fleet which was retired in 2021 and was operated by No. 8 Squadron at RAF Waddington in Lincolnshire. On 21 May 2026, the first of three E-7s was delivered to No. 8 Squadron.

Construction of technical facilities to support Wedgetail operations started in October 2022. Two new single living accommodation blocks, to be named Tain and Alness, are to be built.

== Previous units and aircraft ==
List of past, present and future flying units and major non-flying units permanently based at Lossiemouth.

Source: Unless otherwise indicated details sourced are from: Hughes, Jim. (1993), Airfield Focus 11: Lossiemouth. Peterborough, GMS Enterprises. ISBN 1 870384 24 5, pp. 22–23

Service	Unit	Aircraft / Role	From	Date From	Date To	To
RAF	No. 15 Flight Training School (15 FTS)	North American Harvard, Airspeed Oxford, Hawker Hart, Miles Master	Formed	1 May 1939	20 April 1940	RAF Middle Wallop
RAF	No. 46 Maintenance Unit	Various	Formed	15 April 1940	15 February 1947	Disbanded
RAF	No. 20 Operational Training Unit	Vickers Wellington, Avro Anson, Westland Lysander, Miles Martinet	Formed	27 May 1940	17 July 1945	Disbanded
RAF	No. 57 Squadron	Bristol Blenheim	RAF Wyton	24 June 1940	13 August 1940	RAF Elgin
RAF	No. 21 Squadron	Bristol Blenheim	RAF Watton	24 June 1940	29 October 1940	RAF Watton
RAF	No. 82 Squadron	Bristol Blenheim	RAF Bodney	18 April 1941	3 May 1941	RAF Bodney
RAF	No. 21 Squadron	Bristol Blenheim	RAF Watton	27 May 1941	14 June 1941	RAF Watton
RAF	No. 21 Squadron	Bristol Blenheim	RAF Watton	7 September 1941	21 September 1941	RAF Watton
RAF	No. 111 Operational Training Unit	Consolidated Liberator, Handley Page Halifax, Vickers Wellington	The Bahamas	27 July 1945	1946	Disbanded
FAA	Station Flight	Various	Formed	June 1946	February 1973	Disbanded
FAA	No. 766 Naval Air Squadron	Fairey Firefly, Hawker Sea Fury, Supermarine Seafire, North American Harvard, Miles Martinet	RNAS Rattray	4 August 1946	3 October 1953	RNAS Culdrose
FAA	No. 764 Naval Air Squadron	Supermarine Sea Fire, Fairey Firefly	Re-formed	18 May 1953	23 September 1953	RNAS Yeovilton
FAA	No. 804 Naval Air Squadron	Hawker Sea Hawk	RNAS Lee-on-Solent	30 October 1953	10 May 1955	HMS Eagle (R05)
FAA	No. 736 Naval Air Squadron	Hawker Sea Hawk, Supermarine Scimitar	RNAS Culdrose	4 November 1953	26 March 1965	Disbanded
FAA	No. 738 Naval Air Squadron	Hawker Sea Fury, Hawker Sea Hawk, De Havilland Sea Venom	RNAS Culdrose	9 November 1953	1 January 1964	RNAS Brawdy
FAA	No. 802 Naval Air Squadron	Hawker Sea Hawk	RNAS Lee-on-Solent	23 November 1953	13 September 1956	RNAS Ford
FAA	No. 759 Naval Air Squadron	Supermarine Sea Fire, Hawker Sea Fury, Gloster Meteor, De Havilland Sea Vampire	RNAS Culdrose	28 November 1953	12 October 1954	Disbanded
FAA	No. 801 Naval Air Squadron	Hawker Sea Hawk	Re-formed	14 March 1955	10 October 1956	HMS Centaur (R06)
FAA	No. 811 Naval Air Squadron	Hawker Sea Hawk	Re-formed	16 March 1955	16 May 1956	Disbanded
FAA	No. 810 Naval Air Squadron	Hawker Sea Hawk	Re-formed	4 July 1955	6 August 1956	HMS Bulwark (R08)
FAA	No. 804 Naval Air Squadron	Hawker Sea Hawk	Re-formed	6 February 1956	27 January 1958	HMS Ark Royal (R09)
FAA	No. 803 Naval Air Squadron	Hawker Sea Hawk	Re-formed	14 January 1957	31 March 1958	Disbanded
FAA	No. 806 Naval Air Squadron	Hawker Sea Hawk	Re-formed	14 January 1957	13 April 1959	HMS Eagle (R05)
FAA	No. 764 Naval Air Squadron	Hawker Sea Hawk, Westland Wyvern, Supermarine Scimitar, Hawker Hunter	RNAS Ford	24 June 1957	27 July 1972	Disbanded
FAA	No. 803 Naval Air Squadron	Supermarine Scimitar	Re-formed	3 June 1957	1 October 1966	Disbanded
FAA	No. 807 Naval Air Squadron	Supermarine Scimitar	Re-formed	1 October 1958	15 May 1961	Disbanded
FAA	No. 800 Naval Air Squadron	Supermarine Scimitar	Re-formed	1 July 1959	25 February 1964	Disbanded
FAA	No. 804 Naval Air Squadron	Supermarine Scimitar	Re-formed	1 March 1960	15 September 1961	Disbanded
FAA	No. 700Z Naval Air Squadron	Blackburn Buccaneer	Formed	7 March 1961	15 January 1963	Re-designated 809 NAS
FAA	No. 801 Naval Air Squadron	Blackburn Buccaneer	Re-formed	17 July 1962	27 May 1965	Disbanded
FAA	No. 809 Naval Air Squadron	Blackburn Buccaneer	Former 700Z NAS	15 January 1963	26 March 1965	Re-designated 736 NAS
FAA	No. 800 Naval Air Squadron	Blackburn Buccaneer	Re-formed	18 March 1964	23 February 1972	Disbanded
FAA	No. 800B Naval Air Squadron	Supermarine Scimitar	Formed	9 September 1964	25 May 1965	HMS Eagle (R05)
FAA	No. 764B Naval Air Squadron	Supermarine Scimitar	Formed	26 Match 1965	23 November 1965	Disbanded
FAA	No. 700B Naval Air Squadron	Buccaneer	Formed	9 April 1965	30 September 1965	Disbanded
FAA	No. 750 Naval Air Squadron	Sea Venom	RAF Hal-Far, Malta	23 June 1965	26 September 1972	RNAS Culdrose
FAA	No. 801 Naval Air Squadron	Blackburn Buccaneer	Re-formed	14 October 1965	21 July 1970	Disbanded
FAA	No. 809 Naval Air Squadron	Blackburn Buccaneer	Re-formed	27 January 1966	5 October 1971	RAF Honington
FAA	No. 803 Naval Air Squadron	Blackburn Buccaneer	Re-formed	3 July 1967	18 December 1969	Disbanded
FAA	No. 849 Naval Air Squadron	Fairey Gannet	RNAS Brawdy	19 November 1970	15 December 1978	Disbanded
FAA	No. 849D Naval Air Squadron	Fariey Gannet	RNAS Brawdy	9 December 1970	26 January 1972	Disbanded
FAA	No. 849B Naval Air Squadron	Fariey Gannet	RAF Luqa, Malta	16 December 1970	15 December 1978	Disbanded
RAF	Jaguar Conversion Team	SEPECAT Jaguar	Formed	30 May 1973	1 October 1974	Re-designated No. 226 OCU
RAF	No. 8 Squadron	Avro Shackleton AEW2	RAF Kinloss	14 August 1973	1 July 1991	RAF Waddington
RAF	No. 54 Squadron	SEPECAT Jaguar	Re-formed	29 March 1974	15 August 1978	RAF Coltishall
RAF	No. 226 Operational Conversion Unit (OCU)	SEPECAT Jaguar	Former Jaguar Conversion Team	1 October 1974	November 1991	Re-designated as No. 16 (Reserve) Sqn
RAF	No. 6 Squadron	SEPECAT Jaguar	Re-formed	2 October 1974	15 November 1974	RAF Coltishall
RAF	No. 2 Tactical Weapons Unit	Hawker Hunter, Hawker Siddeley Hawk	Formed	31 July 1978	1 August 1980	RAF Chivenor
RAF	No. 202 Squadron (D Flight)	Westland Whirlwind HAR10, Westland Sea King HAR3	RAF Finningley	August 1978	1 April 2015	Disbanded
RAF Regt.	No. 48 Squadron (RAF Regiment)	BAe Dynamics Rapier Anti-Aircraft Missile	Re-formed	December 1978	1 July 1996	Disbanded
RAuxAF	No. 2622 RAuxAF Squadron	Airfield Ground Defence	Formed	July 1979		
RAF	No. 12 Squadron	Blackburn Buccaneer	RAF Honington	1 November 1980	1993	Disbanded
RAF	No. 208 Squadron	Blackburn Buccaneer	RAF Honington	July 1983	31 March 1994	Disbanded
RAF	No. 237 Operational Conversion Unit (OCU)	Blackburn Buccaneer	RAF Honington	18 October 1984	1 October 1991	Disbanded
RAF	No. 16 (Reserve) Squadron	SEPECAT Jaguar	Former 226 OCU	November 1991	20 July 2000	RAF Coltishall
TA	No. 237 Field Squadron (Territorial Army)	Airfield Damage Repair	Formed	1992	21 May 1999	Disbanded
RAF	No. 12 Squadron	Panavia Tornado GR1B/4	Re-formed	1 October 1993	1 April 2014	Disbanded
RAF	No. 15 (Reserve) Squadron	Panavia Tornado GR1/4	Former 45(R) Squadron at RAF Marham	1 November 1993	31 March 2017	Disbanded
RAF	No. 617 Squadron	Panavia Tornado GR1B/4	RAF Marham	April 1994	1 April 2014	Disbanded
RAF	No. 14 Squadron	Panavia Tornado GR4	RAF Brüggen, Germany	January 2001	1 June 2014	Disbanded
RAF Regt.	No. 51 Squadron (RAF Regiment)	Airfield Ground Defence	RAF Honington	June 2001	Present	
RAF	Moray Flight - No. 602 RAuxAF Squadron	Maritime Operations Support	Formed	2013	Present	
RAF	No. 6 Squadron	Eurofighter Typhoon FGR4	RAF Leuchars	January 2015	Present	
RAF	No. 1 Squadron	Eurofighter Typhoon FGR4	RAF Leuchars	September 2014	Present	
RAF	No. 2 Squadron	Eurofighter Typhoon FGR4	Re-formed	12 January 2015	Present	
RAF	RAF Lossiemouth Mountain Rescue Team	Mountain Rescue Team	Former RAF Kinloss Mountain Rescue Team	February 2015	Present	
RAF	No. 120 Squadron	Boeing Poseidon MRA1	Re-formed	1 April 2018	Present	
RAF	No. 9 Squadron	Eurofighter Typhoon FGR4	Re-formed	1 April 2019	Present	
RAF	No. 201 Squadron	Boeing Poseidon MRA1	Re-formed	2021	Present	
RAF	No. 8 Squadron	Boeing Wedgetail AEW1	RAF Waddington	2021	Present	

== Heritage ==
=== Station badge and motto ===
RAF Lossiemouth's badge, awarded in May 1974, features a snowy owl facing forwards with expanded wings pointed downwards. The owl sits on two crossed claymore swords. The snowy owl can be found in Scotland, and, unlike humans, it has a well-developed ability to see in low-light conditions. This symbolised the use radar for the airborne early warning mission carried out by No. 8 Squadron, which was based at Lossiemouth when the badge was awarded. The owl also reflects the wisdom being provided by the Jaguar Operational Conversion Unit at the time. The claymores, a type of historic Scottish sword, represent the location of the station in Scotland and the potential for attack.

The station's motto, Thoir an aire, translates from Scottish Gaelic as "Be careful".

== Community relations and media ==
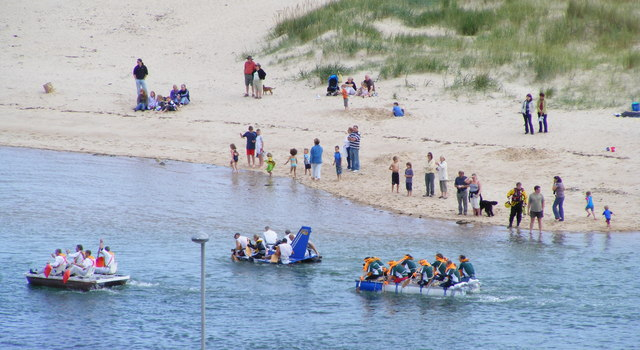
The 2009 Lossiemouth Raft Race

The RAF and local community of Moray enjoy good relations, as demonstrated in 1992 by the station receiving the Freedom of Moray from the then Moray District Council. The freedom was granted in recognition of the role RAF Lossiemouth has played in the defence of the nation and, in particular, the greatly valued contribution which the station has made to the day-to-day life of Moray. The connections between RAF Lossiemouth and Moray were further strengthened on the signing of the Armed Forces Covenant between Moray Council, other community partners and the RAF in 2012 and again in 2016. The co-operation was recognised in November 2016 when the Ministry of Defence awarded Moray Council an award for its supportive attitude towards the armed forces. The RAF contributes to the local community in spending, employment and activities in the wider community. In 2010, Highlands and Islands Enterprise wrote that RAF Lossiemouth contributed £90.3m to the local economy and supported 3,370 jobs in Moray.

The RAF organise the annual charity Lossiemouth Raft Race, in which military and civilian teams race home-made rafts along the River Lossie, adjacent to Lossiemouth's East Beach. The race was established in 1976 and is attended by thousands of onlookers. A Family and Friends Day also takes place where military families and civilians with connections to the station are invited to a small air-show, held each May. The RAF have also provided photo opportunities for aviation enthusiasts during exercises such as Joint Warrior.

The RAF Lossiemouth station magazine is called the Lossie Lighthouse, in reference to the nearby Covesea Skerries Lighthouse. The magazine is distributed to station personnel, their families and the local community. It is also available online at the RAF Lossiemouth web page.

RAF Lossiemouth has featured in several television and radio documentaries –

- Shackleton – The End of an Era was a 1984 programme produced for Granada TV examining the history of the Shackleton aircraft and featuring No. 8 Squadron whilst at Lossiemouth.
- The Old Grey Ladies of Lossiemouth produced by Grampian TV, captured the final months of Shackleton operations in 1990 before their withdrawal from service.
- Rescue was a thirteen-part series which followed the Sea Kings of No. 202 Squadron 'D' Flight for a year and was shown on Grampian TV in 1990.
- 'Gloria Hunniford at RAF Lossiemouth' was a BBC Radio 2 programme broadcast in 1993 in which TV and radio presenter Gloria Hunniford talked to personnel from Lossiemouth and accompanied a helicopter crew on an air sea rescue training exercise.
- JetSet was a six-part series produced by STV in 2006, which followed trainee Tornado GR4 crews as they passed through a six-month operational conversion course with No.15 Squadron. The programme was narrated by Scottish actor Ewan McGregor, whose brother Colin McGregor was a Tornado pilot at Lossiemouth prior to his retirement in 2007.
- Top Guns: Inside the RAF is a six-part series that first aired on Channel 4 in 2023, featuring RAF Lossiemouth's crucial role in safeguarding the UK's airspace and seas.

== See also ==
- Armed forces in Scotland
- Military history of Scotland
- List of Royal Air Force stations
- List of air stations of the Royal Navy

== Bibliography ==
- No. 1 Aeronautical Information Documents Unit (No.1 AIDU) (2016). UK Military Aeronautical Information Publication. Volume 2 (UK Aerodromes Volume). RAF Northolt
- Birtles, Philip (2012). UK Airfields of the Cold War. Midland Publishing. ISBN 978-1-85780-346-4.
- Bishop, Chris and Chris Chant (2004). Aircraft Carriers: The World's Greatest Naval Vessels and Their Aircraft. Minneapolis, Minnesota: Zenith Imprint. ISBN 978-0-7603-2005-1
- Hughes, Jim (1993). Airfield Focus 11: Lossiemouth. Peterborough, GMS Enterprises. ISBN 978-1-870384-24-7
- Hughes, Jim (1999). A Steep Turn to the Stars. Peterborough, GMS Enterprises. ISBN 978-1-870384-71-1
- Jefford, C.G (ed.). "Seminar – Maritime Operations" Royal Air Force Historical Society, 2005. ISSN 1361-4231.
- Pine, L.G. (1983). A Dictionary of Mottoes. 1st edition. London: Routledge & Kegan Paul. ISBN 978-0-7100-9339-4
- Smith, David (1983). Action Stations 7: Military Airfields of Scotland, the North-East and Northern Ireland Cambridge, UK: Patrick Stephens Publishing. ISBN 978-0-85059-563-5
- UK Military Aeronautical Information Publication – Brize Norton (EGVN)
