= No. 2622 Squadron RAuxAF Regiment =

- Squadron badge
- Active: July 1979 – present
- Country: United Kingdom
- Branch: Royal Air Force
- Type: Air Force Infantry
- Role: Force protection
- Part of: No. 5 Force Protection Wing
- Home station: RAF Lossiemouth
- Mottos: Seasaidh sinn ar tir (Scottish Gaelic: We stand our ground)

Insignia
- Squadron badge: A bull
- Squadron badge heraldry: Approved in 1985. Derived from the 'Burghead Bull' archaeological find at the Pictish Fort of Burghead, four miles west of RAF Lossiemouth.

No. 2622 (Highland) Squadron RAuxAF Regiment, is a Royal Auxiliary Air Force RAF Regiment reserve squadron based at RAF Lossiemouth. It is the northernmost RAuxAF Unit in the United Kingdom and was formed in 1979 to assist with the ground defence of that airfield. Initially, personnel were recruited solely from the local area but recruiting now extends as far south as Edinburgh and Glasgow and to the North, East and West Coasts of Scotland. The Squadron is established for 116 Auxiliary personnel plus a small contingent of regular RAF personnel.

The badge of 2622 (Highland) Squadron, approved in 1985, depicts the Burghead Bull, derived from stone carvings found within the Pictish Fort of Burghead, seven miles west of Lossiemouth. The badge carries the Gaelic Motto "Seasaidh Sinn Ar Tir" which is translated as "We stand our ground". Auxiliary officers of the Squadron are entitled to wear the Grey Douglas tartan kilt as part of their mess uniform, a privilege granted to all Scottish RAuxAF officers by King Edward VIII.

Initial recruiting was fairly rapid and the Squadron soon established a solid training regime. In addition to the Squadron's RAF personnel providing trade expertise and support, a small cadre of auxiliary NCOs worked full-time to ensure that the recruiting and training efforts were delivered successfully. Many of the recruits from the 1980s rose through the ranks and served on through the following decades, providing experience and continuity. Throughout the 1980s the Squadron trained specifically for its role in the defence of RAF Lossiemouth. Although not equipped with the manoeuvrability, protection and firepower of the regular RAF Regiment squadrons, there was certainly an abundance of local knowledge, experience and dedication that could have been brought to bear. A number of personnel also participated in a trial to determine the viability of employing Auxiliaries on the Rapier surface-to-air missile system.

In the 1990s the Squadron provided its first volunteers for operational duties with the RAF Regiment in Bosnia, Cyprus and Kuwait. The number of volunteers grew steadily until 2000, when a total of 13 personnel completed operational tours in Kuwait during the year. In 1996 the Squadron moved from its Portakabin headquarters and a hangar shared with the Station Car Club into the hangar and offices vacated by 48 Squadron RAF Regiment on their departure from Lossiemouth. Within 4 years the establishment of 51 Squadron RAF Regiment at RAF Lossiemouth resulted in another move for the Squadron Headquarters and the establishment of joint Armoury, MT and Supply facilities.

Training during the 1990s became aligned with the need for providing sustainment of the regular RAF Regt field squadrons. The focus on collective training and exercise deployments at flight and squadron level was replaced with much greater emphasis on the maintenance of individual skills and currency. Overseas exercises were conducted in Germany and in the United States – the latter in 1999 as part of an exchange programme with the 421st Ground Combat Readiness Squadron of the USAF, at Fort Dix, New Jersey.

January 2003 saw the first large-scale compulsory mobilisation for Operation TELIC. The Squadron provided trained manpower to augment the regular RAF Regiment Field Squadrons Since the end of the war-fighting phase of Operation TELIC further members of the Squadron have served with regular RAF Regiment Squadrons at Basrah Air Station, Bosnia, Afghanistan and the Falkland Islands.

2622 Squadron was presented with its Standard on 30 September 2006.

The 2622sqn RAuxAF Regiment standard is presented to an officer on 30 September 2006

In 2007 saw the first deployment from the Squadron to Afghanistan where eighteen members deployed on operations alongside its sister 51 Squadron RAF Regiment.

2622 Squadron is the only squadron in the entire Royal Air Force with its own Pipe band.

== See also ==
- Armed forces in Scotland
- Military history of Scotland
