= Budget purdah =

Period before the United Kingdom Chancellor of the Exchequer's annual budget is announced

Budget purdah, in the United Kingdom, is the period after plans have been prepared but before the Chancellor of the Exchequer's annual budget is announced, when they refrain from discussing any matters which have relevance to the forthcoming budget.

Traditionally, the non-disclosure of any budget information being available before the Chancellor of the Exchequer delivered the budget speech was highly enforced in government. For example, Hugh Dalton had to resign after he made "an off-the-cuff remark to a journalist, telling him of some of the tax changes" in the autumn 1947 budget speech. However, during the 21st century the practice has substantially been reduced with government routinely preannouncing budget policy before official publication.

== See also ==
- Purdah (pre-election period), the pre-election period in the United Kingdom
