= Caretaker government of Canada =

In Canadian political and constitutional terminology, a caretaker government is a government of Canada or provincial government from when Parliament or the provincial legislature is dissolved by the governor general or provincial lieutenant governor prior to a general election to a period after the election, until the next ministry is appointed. A caretaker government is expected to conduct itself in accordance with a series of well-defined conventions administered by the Privy Council Office or equivalent provincial agency, but there is no law compelling the caretaker government to do so.

There is no separate appointment of a caretaker government. The incumbent prime minister of Canada or provincial premier simply puts the government into "caretaker mode".

== Caretaker conventions ==
Canadian constitutional practice calls for a government to continue in office even after parliament has been dissolved, during the election period and then into the next parliament only until the next government can be formed. The Prime Minister or Premier can however resign office and advise the Governor General or Lieutenant Governor at any time to appoint a new government. The operation of the Canadian political system ensures that a Cabinet is always maintained and that caretaker governments abide by the conventions.

A document entitled "Guidelines on the conduct of Ministers, Ministers of State, exempt staff and public servants during an election" is administered by the Privy Council Office. This states that a caretaker government operates until the election result clearly indicates that either the incumbent party has retained power, or in the case where there is to be a change of government, until the new government has sworn into office.

There are occasions when major appointments or decisions cannot wait until after the election, and the opposition would normally be consulted about them.

== Caretaker government conduct ==
Caretaker provisions explicitly recognise that after the dissolution of parliament, the business of government must continue and that "routine operation of government" must be addressed. Provisions allow for the routine operations of all government departments. However, the caretaker conventions impose some restrictions on the conduct of the caretaker government. The Privy Council Office Guidelines state that government activity during a caretaker period should be restricted to matters that are:

- routine, or
- non-controversial, or
- urgent and in the public interest, or
- reversible by a new government without undue cost or disruption, or
- agreed to by opposition parties (in those cases where consultation is appropriate).

== Post-election ==
If the incumbent prime minister or premier will after an election continue to command a majority of seats in the House of Commons or the provincial legislature, the incumbent government ceases to operate in a caretaker mode.

When an opposition party wins enough seats at a general election to be able to command a majority in the House of Commons or the provincial legislature, the convention is for the incumbent Prime Minister or Premier to publicly concede defeat and, still in caretaker mode, give formal advice to the Governor General or Lieutenant Governor of no longer being able to govern and advising who should be invited to form government, which is usually the leader of the party who now commands a majority of votes in the House of Commons or the provincial legislature.

If after a general election where the opposition obtained the majority at the polls the government refused to resign and clung to office, it would thereby commit a fundamental breach of convention, one so serious indeed that it could be regarded as tantamount to a coup d'état. The remedy in this case would lie with the Governor General or the Lieutenant Governor as the case might be who would be justified in dismissing the ministry and in calling on the opposition to form the government.

— Supreme Court of Canada, Re: Resolution to amend the Constitution

The Governor General or Lieutenant Governor requests the incumbent Prime Minister or Premier and his or her Ministers to remain in office on a caretaker basis until a new government is sworn in, and contacts the nominated successor and invites them to form a government. The nominated successor accepts the invitation and undertakes to inform the Governor General or Lieutenant Governor when the new Ministry is in a position to be sworn in. In the meantime, the caretaker government continues in office until the new government is sworn in.

If it is unclear to the incumbent prime minister or premier who will be able to command a majority in the House of Commons or provincial legislature, they may delay advising the Governor General or Lieutenant Governor as to a potential change of government, and may negotiate an agreement with non official opposition parties as to whether they will vote with a future government on questions of confidence and supply, and may even delay a final decision until the next House of Commons or Provincial Legislature sits, to let the House "test the numbers" by a formal vote in the House.

In most cases, several weeks can elapse between an election and the swearing-in of a new government.

== See also ==
- Purdah (pre-election period) – similar concept in British parliamentary system
- Caretaker government of Australia – Australian parliamentary system equivalent
- Lame duck (politics)
