= No. 51 Squadron RAF Regiment =

Royal Air Force Regiment Squadron

- Squadron badge
- Active: 21 August 1947 – September 1957; 13 July 1964 – 31 March 1993; 8 May 2001 – present
- Country: United Kingdom
- Branch: Royal Air Force
- Type: Air Force Infantry
- Role: Force protection
- Part of: No. 5 Force Protection Wing
- Home station: RAF Lossiemouth
- Mottos: Celeriter defendere (Latin for 'Swift to defend')
- Battle honours: France and Low Countries (1944–1945); Iraq (2003–2011)*; *Honours marked with an asterisk may be emblazoned on the Squadron Standard

Insignia
- Badge: In front of a curved sword with a notched blade is a cheetah depicted at full stride.
- Badge heraldry: Approved in November 1975. The cheetah, a swift, aggressive animal capable of being controlled, is depicted in full stride and the sword with its cutting edge to the right emphasises its military use and refers to the County of Middlesex where the unit was formed.

No. 51 Squadron RAF Regiment is a field squadron of the RAF Regiment in the Royal Air Force. Its mission is protection of RAF bases from ground attack.

== History ==
The history of No. 51 Squadron goes back to 1947 when it was formed at RAF Celle near the Lüneburg Heath in Germany by the redesignation of No. 2713 Squadron RAF Regiment. Its initial role was as a rifle squadron, protecting RAF facilities from ground attack. In 1955 it changed to the light anti-aircraft role which it retained until disbanded in 1957.

In 1964 the squadron reformed, switching back to the rifle role, at the RAF Regiment Depot. The first assignments of the unit after reforming were overseas to Cyprus and Aden where it undertook internal security roles. After Rhodesia unilaterally declared independence in 1965 it was sent to Africa to protect Gloster Javelin aircraft which were deployed in Zambia. After returning to Catterick the unit's next deployment was back to Aden in the immediate period before the British withdrawal from there in 1967. Its service in Aden was mainly spent at the many isolated airfields dotting that colony.

In 1968 the squadron shifted bases with a move to RAF Wittering. This move was undertaken to support the Hawker Siddeley Harrier force which was then becoming operational. With the start of the troubles in Northern Ireland in 1969, No. 51 Squadron deployed to the province, a process which it would repeat at regular intervals for the next 18 years. This period also saw deployments to RAF Salalah and Hong Kong.

In 1982 the squadron moved back to Catterick from Wittering to re-role. It emerged operating the Combat Vehicle Reconnaissance (tracked) family and in wartime it would have moved to Germany to defend airfields there. However its next war service was not to be in Europe but in the Middle East. In aftermath of the Iraqi invasion of Kuwait the squadron deployed to Arabia and detachments saw service at Dharan, Muharraq and Tabuk during the war. Following the Options for Change defence cuts, the squadron was disbanded in 1993.

The dawn of a new century saw a return to active service for the squadron. Once again operating in a field squadron role, it reformed at RAF Honington in 2001 before moving to RAF Lossiemouth. It was not long before war beckoned again and the squadron was deployed in the 2003 invasion of Iraq. Following the invasion the squadron had several roulements back in the region. The squadron deployed three times to Afghanistan; twice to Kandahar Airfield and once to Camp Bastion. Whilst on Force Protection (FP) duties at Kandahar, the squadron suffered a casualty in Senior Aircraftman Christopher Bridge, who was killed when the vehicle he was travelling in struck an IED. The squadron was on FP duties at Camp Bastion when the Taliban launched an attack on the base popularly known as "The Battle of Bastion". This involved squadron personnel actively engaging and repelling enemy forces as part of a wider force including other UK forces and the US Marines. Some weeks after the attack, controversy raged when images of 51 squadron personnel were released showing them kneeling next to dead Taliban fighters with their thumbs up.

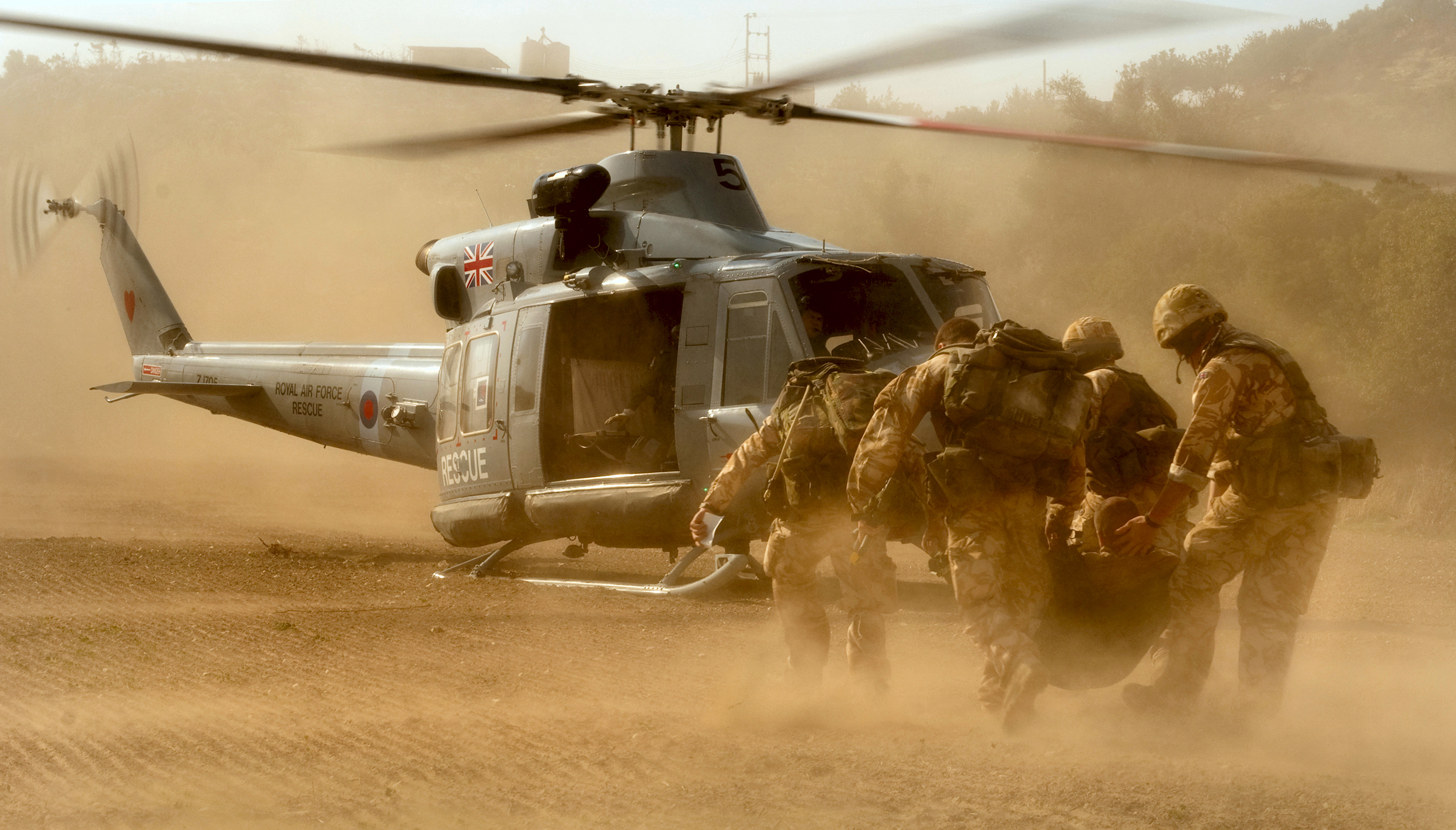
No. 51 Squadron personnel practicing casualty evacuation in Cyprus prior to deployment

Most recently, 20 personnel from the Regiment deployed in support of Operation Shader.

In 2016, the squadron celebrated its 75th anniversary with a parade at their home base of RAF Lossiemouth. Whilst the squadron was formed in 1940, it did not become an official RAF Defence Squadron until 1941.

In April 2021 51 Sqn was highlighted for potential disbandment under new forces cuts.
