= The Caretaker (2025 film) =

2026 psychological horror-thriller film by Luke Tedder

- Official release poster
- Directed by: Luke Tedder
- Written by: Luke Tedder
- Produced by: Andy Luther
- Starring: Ben Probert; Mackenzie Larsen; Scott Hume; P G Pearson; Lauren Shotton; Chris McQuire; Livvy Dawson
- Cinematography: Luke Tedder
- Edited by: Luke Tedder
- Music by: Ollie Rann
- Production company: Landa Pictures
- Distributed by: Ajamax Productions
- Release date: 2025
- Running time: 114 minutes
- Country: United Kingdom
- Language: English

The Caretaker is a British independent psychological horror thriller produced by Landa Pictures. The film is written and directed by Luke Tedder and stars Ben Probert in the lead role of Eddie Hartwood.

== Synopsis ==
The Caretaker is a character-driven horror-thriller set at Lockbridge Academy, an isolated school on the coast, run by the powerful aristocratic Aberdeen family. Eddie is a mute, burdened with caring for his cruel ailing mother. While on the cusp of losing his home, he takes a caretaker position at Lockbridge. There, he meets a cleaner named Marie, sparking a connection that will alter the trajectory of his life, while unraveling a sinister mystery lurking within the school, that could shatter the Aberdeen's family legacy forever.

== Cast ==
- Ben Probert as Eddie Hartwood
- Mackenzie Larsen as Marie
- Scott Hume as Charles Aberdeen III
- P G Pearson as Charles Aberdeen II
- Lauren Shotton as Lisa Aberdeen
- Chris McQuire as George Wallace
- Livvy Dawson as Holly Mansford

Liz Rogers, Dave Morris, Emma Graveling, Noah Carr-Kingsnorth, Hector Baldwin, Heather Cairnes and Alice Corrigan also feature in supporting roles.

== Production ==
The film was shot by Landa Pictures with Luke Tedder both directing and writing.

== Release ==
The film debuted in 2025 at several international festivals, including the Fortean Film Festival, where it received critical acclaim for Probert's nuanced nonverbal performance and cinematic storytelling. It went on to win over twenty international film awards on the festival circuit.

Scheduled at FrightFest 2025 on August 23, 2025, at the Odeon Luxe in the West End of London as part of the United Kingdom genre festival's main showcase.

Rights for the United Kingdom and Ireland theatrical and VOD distribution have been secured by Ajamax Productions, scheduled for a theatrical release in February 2026.

== Reception ==
Vocal Media commented that the film has "big‑budget vibes" and an "impeccable" lead performance.
