= Caretaker ministry =

In the United Kingdom, caretaker ministry may refer to the following short-lived British caretaker governments:

- 1757 caretaker ministry
- Wellington caretaker ministry (1834)
- Salisbury caretaker ministry (1885–1886)
- Churchill caretaker ministry (1945)
