= Caretaker government of Malaysia =

In Malaysian political and constitutional terminology, a caretaker government is a government of Malaysia during a period that starts when the parliament is dissolved by the Yang di-Pertuan Agong (King of Malaysia) before a general election and continues for a period after the election until the next cabinet is formed. A caretaker government is expected to conduct itself under a series of well-defined conventions in maintaining the neutrality of the policy decisions, although there is no law mandating it to do so.

== Caretaker conventions ==
Malaysian constitutional practice calls for a government to continue in office even after parliament has been dissolved, during the election period and then into the next parliament only until the next government can be formed. The prime minister can, however, resign office and advise the Yang di-Pertuan Agong at any time to appoint a new federal government. The operation of the Malaysian political system ensures that a Cabinet is always maintained and that caretaker governments abide by the conventions.

A caretaker government operates until the election result clearly indicates that either the incumbent party or coalition has retained power, or in the case where there is to be a change of government, until the new government is appointed by the Yang di-Pertuan Agong. These conventions are not legally binding, and do not constitute "hard and fast rules." In practice, any flouting of the conventions by a caretaker government would immediately come to light, and could go against them in the election campaign.

== Caretaker government conduct ==
The Caretaker provisions explicitly recognise that, after the dissolution of parliament, the business of government must continue and that "ordinary matters of administration" must be addressed. Hence the provisions allow for the normal operations of all government departments. However, the caretaker conventions impose some restrictions on the conduct of the caretaker government. The conventions broadly include the following:

- Major policy decisions. The Government will cease taking major policy decisions except on urgent matters and then only after formal consultation with the Opposition. The conventions apply to the making of decisions, not to their announcement. Accordingly, the conventions are not infringed where decisions made before dissolution are announced during the caretaker period. However, where possible, decisions would normally be announced ahead of dissolution.
- Significant appointments. The Government will cease making major appointments of public officials, but may make acting or short-term appointments.
- Major contracts or undertakings. The Government will avoid entering major contracts or undertakings during the caretaker period. If it is not possible to defer the commitment until after the caretaker period, for legal, commercial or other reasons, a minister could consult the Opposition, or agencies could deal with the contractor and ensure that contracts include clauses providing for termination in the event of an incoming government not wishing to proceed. Similar provisions cover tendering.
- International negotiations and visits. The Government ordinarily seeks to defer such major international negotiations, or adopts observer status, until the end of the caretaker period.
- Avoiding PSC involvement in election activities. The Public Services Commission of Malaysia adopts a neutral stance while continuing to advise the Government. There are several cases, notably the pricing of Opposition election promises, in which the PSC conducts an investigation and report for the benefit of the electorate at large.

== Change of government ==
When an opposition party or coalition wins enough seats at a general election to be able to command a majority in the Dewan Rakyat, the convention is for the incumbent prime minister (still in caretaker mode) to formally advise the Yang di-Pertuan Agong that they are no longer able to govern, and that the Leader of the Opposition should be invited to form a government. The Yang di-Pertuan Agong then requests the incumbent prime minister and other ministers to remain in office on a caretaker basis until a new government is sworn in. The Yang di-Pertuan Agong then contacts the Leader of the Opposition and invites them to form a government. The Leader of the Opposition accepts the invitation, and undertakes to inform the Yang di-Pertuan Agong when the new Cabinet is in a position to be sworn in. This can be delayed by the counting of votes in closely contested seats, or by the processes by which ministers are chosen under the relevant party's rules. In the meantime, the caretaker government continues in office.

== Caretaker government at state level ==
The same condition of caretaker government also apply to the thirteen states of Malaysia. A caretaker government at state level is a state government during a period that starts when the state assembly is dissolved by the sultan / raja / governor prior to a state election, and continues for a period after the election, until the next executive council (known as cabinet in Sabah and Sarawak) is appointed. A caretaker government at state level is expected to conduct itself in accordance with a series of well-defined conventions that are administered by the State Secretariat, although there is no law compelling the caretaker government at state level to do so.

Malaysian constitutional practice calls for a state government to continue in office even after state assembly has been dissolved, during the election period and then into the next state assembly only until the next state government can be formed. The Menteri Besar (or chief minister) can, however, resign office and advise the sultan / raja / governor at any time to appoint a new state government. The operation of the Malaysian political system ensures that an executive council (or cabinet) is always maintained and that caretaker governments at state level abide by the conventions.

A caretaker government at state level operates until the election result clearly indicates that either the incumbent party or coalition has retained power, or in the case where there is to be a change of government, until the new state government is appointed by the sultan / raja / governor. These conventions are not legally binding, and do not constitute "hard and fast rules." In practice, any flouting of the conventions by a caretaker government at state level would immediately come to light, and could go against them in the election campaign.

=== Caretaker government conduct at state level ===
The Caretaker provisions explicitly recognise that, after the dissolution of state assembly, the business of government must continue and that "ordinary matters of administration" must be addressed. Hence the provisions allow for the normal operations of all state government departments. However, the caretaker conventions impose some restrictions on the conduct of the caretaker government at state level. The conventions broadly include the following:

- Major policy decisions. The State Government will cease taking major policy decisions except on urgent matters and then only after formal consultation with the Opposition. The conventions apply to the making of decisions, not to their announcement. Accordingly, the conventions are not infringed where decisions made before dissolution are announced during the caretaker period. However, where possible, decisions would normally be announced ahead of dissolution.
- Significant appointments. The State Government will cease making major appointments of public officials, but may make acting or short-term appointments.
- Major contracts or undertakings. The State Government will avoid entering major contracts or undertakings during the caretaker period. If it is not possible to defer the commitment until after the caretaker period, for legal, commercial or other reasons, a minister could consult the Opposition, or agencies could deal with the contractor and ensure that contracts include clauses providing for termination in the event of an incoming government not wishing to proceed. Similar provisions cover tendering.
- International negotiations and visits. The State Government ordinarily seeks to defer such major international negotiations, or adopts observer status, until the end of the caretaker period.
- Avoiding PSC involvement in election activities. The Public Services Commission of Malaysia adopts a neutral stance while continuing to advise the State Government. There are several cases, notably the pricing of Opposition election promises, in which the PSC conducts an investigation and report for the benefit of the electorate at large.

=== Change of government at state level ===
When an opposition party or coalition wins enough seats at a state election to be able to command a majority in the Dewan Undangan Negeri, the convention is for the incumbent Menteri Besar / chief minister (still in caretaker mode) to formally advise the sultan / raja / governor that he or she is no longer able to govern, and that the Leader of the Opposition should be invited to form a state government. The sultan / raja / governor then requests the incumbent Menteri Besar / chief minister and his or her executive council (or cabinet) members to remain in office on a caretaker basis until a new state government is sworn in. The sultan / raja / governor then contacts the Leader of the Opposition and invites them to form a state government. The Leader of the Opposition accepts the invitation, and undertakes to inform the sultan / raja / governor when the new executive council is in a position to be sworn in. This can be delayed by the counting of votes in closely contested seats, or by the processes by which executive council (or cabinet) members are chosen under the relevant party's rules. In the meantime, the caretaker government at state level continues in office.
