= Purdah (pre-election period) =

Election rules in the United Kingdom

Purdah (/ˈpɜːrdə/) is the period in the United Kingdom between the announcement of an election and the formation of the new elected government. It affects civil servants, who must be politically impartial, preventing central and local government from making announcements about any new or controversial government initiatives that could be seen to be advantageous to any candidates or parties in the forthcoming election. Purdah does not apply to candidates for political office. Where a court determines that actual advantage has been given to a candidate, this may amount to a breach of Section 2 of the Local Government Act 1986.

The name has been criticised for its connection to the sexist practice of purdah, and various public bodies and departments have dropped it in favour of terms like "pre-election period" and "heightened sensitivity".

== Etymology ==
The word purdah is Hindustani in origin and literally refers to a curtain or veil. Purdahs were traditionally used to screen women from male view, and the word came to be a general term for the South Asian practices of segregating the sexes and keeping women's bodies concealed. In English use, the word has the extended sense of "a period of seclusion or isolation", hence its use in politics.

== Practice and legal status ==
The purdah period typically begins six weeks before the scheduled election, in each authority on the day the notice of election is published; for the 2017 elections to Combined Authority Mayors, purdah began on 23 March. For the 8 June 2017 general election, purdah began on 22 April, and for the 12 December 2019 general election, purdah commenced on 6 November. For the 4 July 2024 general election, purdah began on 25 May.

Purdah has been imposed in ministerial guidance since at least the early 20th century reflecting an earlier "self-denying ordinance", and has considerable moral authority, its breach carrying with it in worst cases the possibility of actions for abuse of power and misconduct in public office. Otherwise its lack of statute or common law means different local authorities adopt different standards as to the extent to which they observe the convention, and executives are always mindful of the possibility of decisions being open to judicial review on the grounds of legitimate expectations, breach of natural justice, or procedural impropriety if purdah is breached. Where observed by executive officers, purdah bars entering into any transactions or carrying out any works which would clearly or directly conflict with the stated intentional commitments (manifesto) of the cabinet or shadow cabinet in any authority. When local elections are being held at the same time as a general election, this higher standard is usually applied.

At the national level, major decisions on policy are postponed until after purdah, unless it is in the national interest to proceed, or a delay would waste public money. The Cabinet Office issues guidance before each election to civil servants, including those in the devolved national parliaments and assemblies. The period also continues after the election during the time in which new MPs and ministers are sworn in. In the event of an inconclusive election result, purdah does not end until a new government forms. When no party has an overall majority, it may take some time before a minority or coalition government is formed.

Section 2 of the Local Government Act 1986 prohibits the publication by local authorities of material which, in whole or in part, appears to be designed to affect public support for a political party.

== Local government ==
For local elections in England and Wales, the activities of local authorities in purdah are governed by the Recommended code of practice for local authority publicity, Circular 01/2011, issued as part of the provisions of the Local Government Act 1986. Section 39 of the Local Audit and Accountability Act 2014 inserted sections 4A and 4B into the Local Government Act 1986 which provide powers for the Secretary of State to issue a notice to comply or explain, followed after non-compliance, by a direction; and to issue a more general Order if approved by Parliament across multiple authorities to comply in some respects with provisions of the recommendatory, good practice, code. The code mentions at the outset that it in no way detracts from the section 2 offence of the Act.

Care during periods of heightened sensitivity

33. Local authorities should pay particular regard to the legislation governing publicity during the period of heightened sensitivity before elections and referendums – see paragraphs 7 to 9 of this code. It may be necessary to suspend the hosting of material produced by third parties, or to close public forums during this period to avoid breaching any legal restrictions.

34. During the period between the notice of an election and the election itself, local authorities should not publish any publicity on controversial issues or report views or proposals in such a way that identifies them with any individual members or groups of members. Publicity relating to individuals involved directly in the election should not be published by local authorities during this period unless expressly authorised by or under statute. It is permissible for local authorities to publish factual information which identifies the names, wards and parties of candidates at elections.

35. In general, local authorities should not issue any publicity which seeks to influence voters. However this general principle is subject to any statutory provision which authorises expenditure being incurred on the publication of material designed to influence the public as to whether to support or oppose a question put at a referendum. It is acceptable to publish material relating to the subject matter of a referendum, for example to correct any factual inaccuracies which have appeared in publicity produced by third parties, so long as this is even-handed and objective and does not support or oppose any of the options which are the subject of the vote.

The purdah period in local government ends on the close of polls which, for ordinary elections, is usually on the first Thursday in May.

== National Health Service ==
Although NHS staff are not generally regarded as civil servants, purdah is increasingly enforced on NHS bodies. In 2017 it was decided that the financial result of the NHS provider sector, normally published in May each year, should be postponed until after the General Election. This was controversial, and was seen by many as an attempt by the government of the day to gag NHS bodies from publishing information it saw as a threat to its general election campaign.

== Referendum on elected mayors ==
In the 2012 referendum on elected mayors for the core cities of Birmingham, Bradford, Bristol, Coventry, Leeds, Manchester, Newcastle, Nottingham, Sheffield, and Wakefield an extra purdah restriction was introduced, namely that from 6 April councils were not able to promote in an opinionated manner the referendum by publishing articles or issuing press releases. However, public information in the form of questions and answers was still permitted to be on the council's website, and press officers were able to respond to enquiries from the media.

== Social media ==
In the 2010 United Kingdom general election, specific guidance was issued to executive departments about their use of social media, as opposed to that of political representatives, for example "Use of Twitter may continue for publishing factual information only in line with guidance on news media".

Civil servants are urged not to post anything political on social media. In the 2015 United Kingdom general election, general guidance about use of websites, blogs and social media was provided.

== See also ==
- Budget purdah
- Caretaker government of Australia – similar concept in the Australian parliamentary system
- Caretaker government of Canada – similar concept in the Canadian parliamentary system
- Election Commission of India's Model Code of Conduct
- Election silence – general concept of banning or restricting politically charged expression prior to and/or during an election
