= Thomas Brunell =

American political scientist

Thomas L. Brunell
- Born: 1968; California
- Education: University of California, Irvine
- Scientific career
- Thesis: Short-term versus Long-term Forces in U.S. Senate Elections (1997)
- Academic advisors: Bernard Grofman

Thomas L. Brunell is an American political scientist and professor of political science at the University of Texas at Dallas (UT Dallas). His research focuses on American politics, congressional elections, redistricting, political representation, and partisan polarization.

== Education ==
Brunell earned a B.A. (1991), M.A. (1993), and Ph.D. (1997) in political science, all from the University of California, Irvine. As a graduate student he received the University of California Regents Dissertation Fellowship and the Order of Merit for Outstanding Graduate Scholarship from UC Irvine’s School of Social Sciences.

== Career ==
After finishing his Ph.D., Brunell received a Congressional Fellowship from the American Political Science Association that allowed him to work for a year on Capitol Hill. He worked for the Subcommittee on the Census in the U.S. House of Representatives in 1998-99. Later he published several academic articles on the statistical adjustment of the decennial census. Brunell began his academic career as an assistant professor of political science at Binghamton University, State University of New York, where he taught from 1999 to 2003. He then served as an assistant professor of political science at Northern Arizona University from 2003 to 2005. In 2005, Brunell joined the University of Texas at Dallas as an associate professor of political science and was promoted to professor in 2009.

At UT Dallas he has served as director of graduate studies for the Political Science Program (2007–2010), senior associate dean (2010–2012), program head for Political Science and for Public Policy and Political Economy, and interim director of the Texas Schools Project.

Brunell has held visiting fellowships at the Australian National University and the University of Sydney. In November 2017, news outlets reported that the Trump administration intended to appoint Brunell deputy director of the United States Census Bureau, a position that serves as the bureau’s chief operating officer and oversees the administration of the decennial census.

The reported appointment drew public commentary from journalists and academics. In February 2018, Brunell withdrew from consideration for the position. In 2020, Brunell was appointed to the Census Scientific Advisory Committee by the Director of the U.S. Census Bureau.

== Research and scholarship ==
Brunell’s research examines American political institutions and electoral politics, with particular emphasis on congressional elections, redistricting, representation, political parties, and polarization. His work on redistricting has explored the relationship between electoral competitiveness and political representation, including the effects of district boundaries on congressional elections.

His research on polarization has examined the development and consequences of ideological divisions in the United States Congress. He has also studied congressional voting behavior, the effects of state-level policy on national legislators, minority representation, and the use of comparative legislative data to identify partisan realignments. Brunell is the author of Redistricting and Representation: Why Competitive Elections Are Bad for America (Routledge, 2008), which argues that highly competitive congressional elections do not necessarily produce better representation. With Robert Lowry, Banks Miller, and Thomas Gray, he co-authored the textbooks Introduction to American Government and Introduction to State and Local Government, both published by TopHat in 2021. In 2023, he co-authored How Polarization Begets Polarization: Ideological Extremism in the US Congress (Oxford University Press) with Samuel Merrill III and Bernard Grofman, which examines the relationship between ideological polarization and political behavior in Congress.

Brunell’s articles have appeared in journals including the American Political Science Review, the Journal of Politics, Legislative Studies Quarterly, PS: Political Science & Politics, Social Science Quarterly, and the Journal of Race, Ethnicity, and Politics.

== Public commentary ==
Brunell has frequently provided political analysis to news organizations and broadcast media, particularly on elections, redistricting, congressional politics, and the Republican Party. He has been quoted or interviewed by outlets including Fox Business, the Associated Press, Newsweek, The New York Times, The Daily Beast, HuffPost, The Dallas Morning News, The Philadelphia Inquirer, and the Pittsburgh Tribune-Review. In 2016, he was quoted by Fox Business in coverage of Ted Cruz’s Texas campaign ahead of Super Tuesday and was interviewed by Dallas-area radio and television outlets about presidential election issues, turnout, and the future of the Republican Party.

His research on special elections was discussed in The Daily Beast and by Nate Silver in The New York Times’ FiveThirtyEight column in 2011. In 2010, he was quoted by the Associated Press in an article on vulnerable Democratic members of the U.S. House of Representatives. He has also appeared on local television and radio programs, including McCuistion, a PBS-affiliated public affairs program in Texas, where he discussed redistricting, the Tea Party movement, and the 2010 elections, and KERA’s Think with Krys Boyd, where he discussed Redistricting and Representation.

Brunell has also written newspaper commentary, including a 2008 op-ed in The Dallas Morning News on redistricting and representation and a 2004 op-ed in Newsday on the effect of the timing of events on presidential elections.

== Grants and fellowships ==
Brunell’s research has been supported by academic and philanthropic organizations. With Sarah Maxwell, he received a $50,000 grant from the Rita & Alex Hillman Foundation for research on the prevention and detection of vector-borne illness among migrant and seasonal farmworkers. He held a visiting fellowship at the University of Sydney’s United States Studies Centre and the Election Integrity Project in 2013 and a visiting fellowship at the Australian National University in 2014.

He has also received grants from the UT Dallas EPPS Advisory Board for research on redistricting and from Northern Arizona University’s Intramural Grants Program for research on the effects of redistricting on House elections. Earlier awards include a Dean’s Research Semester Award from Binghamton University and a Scaife Foundation Fellowship to attend the ICPSR Summer Program in statistical methods.

== Publications ==
=== Selected books ===
- Merrill, S., III, Grofman, B., & Brunell, T. L. (2023). How polarization begets polarization: Ideological extremism in the US Congress. Oxford University Press.
- Brunell, T. L., Lowry, R., Miller, B., & Gray, T. (2021). Introduction to American government. TopHat.
- Brunell, T. L., Lowry, R., Miller, B., & Gray, T. (2021). Introduction to state and local politics. TopHat.
- Brunell, Thomas L. (2008). Redistricting and Representation: Why Competitive Elections Are Bad for America. Routledge. ISBN 978-0415964531.

=== Selected journal articles ===
- Lublin, D., Handley, L., Brunell, T. L., & Grofman, B. (2020). Minority success in non-majority minority districts: Finding the “sweet spot.” Journal of Race, Ethnicity, and Politics, 5, 275–298.
- Brunell, T. L., & Cease, B. (2019). How do state-level environmental policies impact the voting behavior of national legislators? Social Science Quarterly, 100(1), 289–306.
- Brunell, T. L., & Grofman, B. (2018). Using U.S. Senate delegations from the same state as paired comparisons: Evidence for a Reagan realignment. PS: Political Science & Politics, 51(3), 512–516.
- Brunell, T. L., Grofman, B., & Merrill, S., III. (2016). Components of party polarization in the U.S. House of Representatives. Journal of Theoretical Politics, 28(4), 598–624.
- Brunell, T. L., Grofman, B., & Merrill, S., III. (2016). Replacement in U.S. House: An outlier-chasing model. Party Politics, 22(4), 427–439.
- Brunell, T. L., Grofman, B., & Merrill, S., III. (2016). The volatility of median and supermajoritarian pivots in the U.S. Congress and the effects of party polarization. Public Choice, 166, 183–204.
- Bowler, S., Brunell, T., Donovan, T., & Gronke, P. (2015). Election administration and perception of fair elections. Electoral Studies, 38, 1–9.
- Brunell, T. L., & Manzo, W. R. (2014). The impact of Cox v. Larios on state legislative population deviations. Election Law Journal, 13(3), 351–361.
- Merrill, S., III, Brunell, T. L., & Grofman, B. (2014). Modeling the electoral dynamics of party polarization in two-party legislatures. Journal of Theoretical Politics, 26(4), 548–572.
- Stone Sweet, A., & Brunell, T. L. (2013). Trustee courts and the judicialization of international regimes: The politics of majoritarian activism in the European Convention on Human Rights, the European Union, and the World Trade Organization. Journal of Law and Courts, 1(1), 61–88.
- Brunell, T. L. (2012). The one person, one vote standard in redistricting: The uses and abuses of population deviations in legislative redistricting. Case Western Reserve Law Review, 62(4), 1057–1077.
- Grofman, B., Brunell, T. L., & Feld, S. L. (2012). Towards a theory of bicameralism: The neglected contributions of the calculus of consent. Public Choice, 152(1–2), 147–161.
- Brunell, T. L., Grofman, B., & Merrill, S., III. (2012). Magnitude and durability of electoral change: Identifying critical elections in the U.S. Congress, 1854–2010. Electoral Studies, 31(4), 816–828.
