= List of Royal Air Force schools =

List of schools within the Royal Air Force

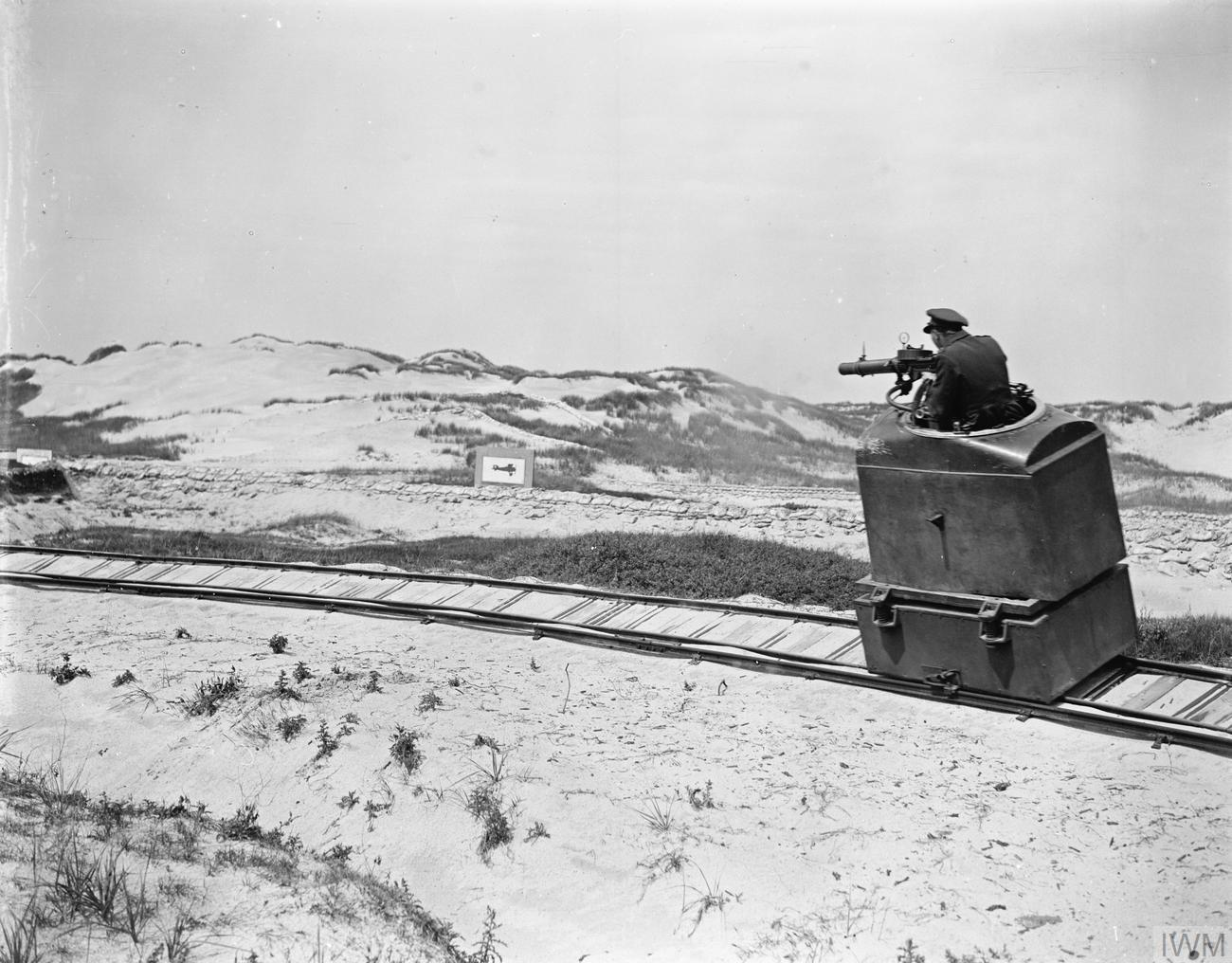
The RAF Gunnery School between Rang-du-Fliers and Verton. A Pilot Officer firing at fixed targets representing German aircraft from a 'cockpit' moving along curving rails, 17 July 1918

This is a list of schools within the Royal Air Force, including the empire flying training scheme, civilian and service elementary training schemes, and gliding schools.

== Schools ==
The Royal Air Force operated many schools to train aircrew in the many and various skills required to operate an air force.

Air Gunners School
- No. 1 Air Gunners School RAF (1941–45)
- No. 2 Air Gunners School RAF (1941–45)
- No. 3 Air Gunners School RAF (1942–45)
- No. 4 Air Gunners School RAF (1942–44)
- No. 6 Air Gunners School RAF (1942)
- No. 7 Air Gunners School RAF (1941–44)
- No. 8 Air Gunners School RAF (1941–44)
- No. 9 Air Gunners School RAF (1941–42)
- No. 10 Air Gunners School RAF (1941–46, 1946–47)
- No. 11 Air Gunners School RAF (1943–47)
- No. 12 Air Gunners School RAF (1943–45)
- No. 13 Air Gunners School RAF (1943–45)

Air Navigation School

- No. 1 Air Navigation School RAF (1947–54, 1957–70)
- No. 2 Air Navigation School RAF (1947–70)
- No. 3 Air Navigation School RAF (1948–51, 1952–54)
- No. 4 Air Navigation School RAF (1952) became No. 5 Air Navigation School RAF
- No. 5 Air Navigation School RAF (1945–47, 1951–52, 1952–53)
- No. 6 Air Navigation School RAF (1952–53)
- No. 7 Air Navigation School RAF (1947) became No. 2 Air Navigation School RAF
- No. 10 Air Navigation School RAF (1945–48)
- No. 31 Air Navigation School RAF (1940–45)
- No. 32 Air Navigation School RAF (1941–42)
- No. 33 Air Navigation School RAF (1941–44)

Air Observers School

- No. 1 Air Observers School RAF (1938–39, 1941–42) became No. 1 (Observers) Advanced Flying Unit RAF
- No. 2 Air Observers School RAF (1938–39, 1941–42) became No. 2 (Observers) Advanced Flying Unit RAF
- No. 3 Air Observers School RAF (1939, 1941–42) became No. 3 (Observers) Advanced Flying Unit RAF
- No. 4 Air Observers School RAF (1939, 1941–43) became No. 4 (Observers) Advanced Flying Unit RAF
- No. 5 Air Observers School RAF (1939, 1941–44) became Air Navigation and Bombing School RAF
- No. 6 Air Observers School RAF (1942–43) became No. 6 (Observers) Advanced Flying Unit RAF
- No. 7 Air Observers School RAF (1939, 1943–44) became No. 7 (Observers) Advanced Flying Unit RAF
- No. 8 Air Observers School RAF (1939) became No. 8 Bombing and Gunnery School RAF
- No. 9 Air Observers School RAF (1939, 1941–42) became No. 9 (Observers) Advanced Flying Unit RAF
- No. 10 Air Observers School RAF (1939–40, 1941–42) became No. 10 (Observers) Advanced Flying Unit RAF
- No. 24 Combined Air Observers School RAF (1941–43) became No. 24 Bombing, Gunnery and Navigation School RAF

Air Observers Navigation School

- No. 1 Air Observers Navigation School RAF (1939–41)
- No. 2 Air Observers Navigation School RAF (1939–40)
- No. 3 Air Observers Navigation School RAF (1939–40, 1941) became No. 3 Air Observers School RAF
- No. 4 Air Observers Navigation School RAF (1939–41)
- No. 5 Air Observers Navigation School RAF (1939–40, 1940) became No. 45 Air School, SAAF
- No. 6 Air Observers Navigation School RAF (1939–40) became No. 6 Air Observers School RAF
- No. 7 Air Observers Navigation School RAF (1939–40)
- No. 8 Air Observers Navigation School RAF (1939)
- No. 9 Air Observers Navigation School RAF (1939–40)
- No. 10 Air Observers Navigation School RAF (1939)
- No. 11 Air Observers Navigation School RAF (1939–41)

Bombing and Gunnery School

- No. 1 Bombing and Gunnery School RAF (1939–41) became No. 1 Air Gunners School RAF
- No. 2 Bombing and Gunnery School RAF (1941) became No. 2 Air Observers School RAF
- No. 3 Bombing and Gunnery School RAF (1939–40)
- No. 4 Bombing and Gunnery School RAF (1939–41) became No. 4 Air Observers School RAF
- No. 5 Bombing and Gunnery School RAF (1939–41) became No. 5 Air Observers School RAF
- No. 7 Bombing and Gunnery School RAF (1939–41) became No. 7 Air Gunners School RAF
- No. 8 Bombing and Gunnery School RAF (1939–41) became No. 8 Air Gunners School RAF
- No. 9 Bombing and Gunnery School RAF (1939–41) became No. 9 Air Observers School RAF
- No. 10 Bombing and Gunnery School RAF (1940–41) became No. 10 Air Observers School RAF
- No. 31 Bombing and Gunnery School RAF (1941–44)

Civil Air Navigation School

- No. 1 Civil Air Navigation School RAF (1938–39) became No. 1 Air Observers Navigation School RAF
- No. 2 Civil Air Navigation School RAF (1938–39) became No. 2 Air Observers Navigation School RAF
- No. 3 Civil Air Navigation School RAF (1938–39) became No. 3 Air Observers Navigation School RAF
- No. 4 Civil Air Navigation School RAF (1938–39) became No. 4 Air Observers Navigation School RAF
- No. 5 Civil Air Navigation School RAF (1939) became No. 5 Air Observers Navigation School RAF
- No. 6 Civil Air Navigation School RAF (1939) became No. 6 Air Observers Navigation School RAF
- No. 7 Civil Air Navigation School RAF (1939) became No. 7 Air Observers Navigation School RAF
- No. 8 Civil Air Navigation School RAF (1939) became No. 8 Air Observers Navigation School RAF
- No. 9 Civil Air Navigation School RAF (1939) became No. 9 Air Observers Navigation School RAF
- No. 10 Civil Air Navigation School RAF (1939) became No. 10 Air Observers Navigation School RAF

Fighting School

- No. 1 Fighting School RAF (1918–19)
- No. 2 Fighting School RAF (1918–19)
- No. 3 Fighting School RAF (1918–19) became No. 7 Training Squadron RAF
- No. 4 Fighting School RAF (1918–20)
- No. 5 Fighting School RAF (1918–19)

Lancaster Finishing School

- No. 1 Lancaster Finishing School RAF (1943–44)
- No. 3 Lancaster Finishing School RAF (1943–45)
- No. 5 Lancaster Finishing School RAF (1943–45)
- No. 6 Lancaster Finishing School RAF (1945) became No. 1384 (Heavy Transport) Conversion Unit RAF

Middle East Training School

- No. 1 Middle East Training School RAF (1942–43) became No. 1 (Middle East) Central Gunnery School RAF
- No. 2 Middle East Training School RAF (1942–43)
- No. 3 Middle East Training School RAF (1942–44)
- No. 4 Middle East Training School RAF (1942–44)
- No. 5 Middle East Training School RAF (1942–44)

Radio School

Signals School

Technical Training schools

- No. 1 School of Technical Training RAF (1920–93 & 1994–)
- No. 2 School of Technical Training RAF (1920–21) became Boys Wing, Cranwell & (1938–1995) merged into No. 1 School of Technical Training RAF. Reformed on 20 July 2023 and took responsibility for the activities of the Aerosystems Engineer and Management Training School.
- No. 3 School of Technical Training RAF (1935–39 & 1939–44 & 1959–74)
- No. 4 School of Technical Training RAF (1938-present)
- No. 5 School of Technical Training RAF (1939–50 & 1967–68) became No. 3 Squadron of No. 228 Operational Conversion Unit RAF
- No. 6 School of Technical Training RAF (1939–48)
- No. 7 School of Technical Training RAF (1940–44)
- No. 8 School of Technical Training RAF (1940–65)
- No. 9 School of Technical Training RAF (1939–42 & 1959–74)
- No. 10 School of Technical Training RAF (1940–58)
- No. 11 School of Technical Training RAF (1940–45 & 1945–47)
- No. 12 School of Technical Training RAF (1940–65); was at RAF Melksham in 1961
- No. 13 School of Technical Training RAF (1940) became No. 14 School of Technical Training RAF
- No. 14 School of Technical Training RAF (1940–44) became No. 14 (Polish) School of Technical Training RAF (1951–52)
- No. 14 (Polish) School of Technical Training RAF (1945–48)
- No. 15 School of Technical Training RAF (1948–53)
- No. 16 (Polish) School of Technical Training RAF (1945–46)
- No. 21 School of Technical Training RAF (1941–43 & 1943–46)

Aerial Fighting and Gunnery schools

- No. 1 School of Aerial Fighting and Gunnery RAF (1918) became No. 1 Fighting School RAF
- No. 2 School of Aerial Fighting and Gunnery RAF (1918) became No. 2 Fighting School RAF
- No. 3 School of Aerial Fighting and Gunnery RAF (1918) became No. 3 Fighting School RAF
- No. 4 School of Aerial Fighting and Gunnery RAF (1918) became No. 4 Fighting School RAF

Navigation and Bomb Dropping schools

- No. 1 School of Aerial Navigation and Bomb Dropping RAF (1918) became No. 1 School of Navigation and Bomb Dropping RAF
- No. 2 School of Aerial Navigation and Bomb Dropping RAF (1918) became No. 2 School of Navigation and Bomb Dropping RAF
- No. 3 School of Aerial Navigation and Bomb Dropping RAF (1918) became No. 3 School of Navigation and Bomb Dropping RAF
- No. 4 School of Aerial Navigation and Bomb Dropping RAF (1918) became No. 4 School of Navigation and Bomb Dropping RAF
- No. 1 School of Navigation and Bomb Dropping RAF (−1919) became School of Air Pilotage RAF
- No. 2 School of Navigation and Bomb Dropping RAF (−1919) became School of Air Pilotage RAF
- No. 3 School of Navigation and Bomb Dropping RAF (−1919)
- No. 4 School of Navigation and Bomb Dropping RAF (−1919)

Recruit Training schools

- No. 1 School of Recruit Training RAF (1948-51 at Melksham/Henlow/Cardington)
- No. 2 School of Recruit Training RAF (1948-50 at Cardington)
- No. 3 School of Recruit Training RAF (1948-57 at Padgate)
- No. 4 School of Recruit Training RAF (1948-57 at Wilmslow)
- No. 5 School of Recruit Training RAF (1948-58 at West Kirby)
- No. 6 School of Recruit Training RAF (1950-52 at Hereford)
- No. 7 School of Recruit Training RAF (1948-70 at Bridgnorth/Innsworth/Swinderby)
- No. 8 School of Recruit Training RAF (1950-52 at Kirkham)
- No. 9 School of Recruit Training RAF (1950-52 at Weeton)
- No. 10 School of Recruit Training RAF (1950-53 at Melksham)
- No. 11 School of Recruit Training RAF (1950-56 at Hednesford)
- No. 12 School of Recruit Training RAF (1950-51 at Cosford)
- No. 13 School of Recruit Training RAF (1950-52 at Innsworth)
- No. 14 School of Recruit Training RAF (-1952 at Henlow)

Various schools

- No. 1 (Auxiliary) School of Aerial Gunnery RAF (1917–18) became No. 1 (Observer) School of Aerial Gunnery RAF
- No. 1 (Coastal) Engine Control Demonstration Unit RAF (1943–44) became Engine Control Instruction Flight RAF
- No. 1 (Middle East) Central Gunnery School RAF (1943) became Royal Air Force (Middle East) Central Gunnery School RAF
- No. 1 (Observers) School of Aerial Gunnery RAF (1918–19, 1919)
- No. 1 (Training) Wireless School RAF (1917–19) became Electrical and Wireless School RAF
- No. 1 Air Armament School RAF (1937–44)
- No. 1 Air Electronics School RAF (1957–60) became Air Electronics School RAF
- No. 1 Air Signallers School RAF (1951–57) became No. 1 Air Electronics School RAF
- No. 1 Basic Air Navigation School RAF (1951–53)
- No. 1 Beam Approach School RAF (1941–46)
- No. 1 Blind Approach School RAF (1941) became No. 1 Beam Approach School RAF
- No. 1 Coastal Defence Training Unit RAF (1933–35) became Coastal Defence Development Unit RAF
- No. 1 Electrical and Wireless School RAF (1938–40) became No. 1 Signals School RAF
- No. 1 Grading School RAF (1951–52) became Airwork Grading Unit RAF
- No. 1 Ground Defence Gunners School RAF (1939–42) became No. 3 RAF Regiment School
- No. 1 Initial Training School RAF (??-1947, 1948–53, 1953–66) became Aircrew Officers Training School RAF
- No. 1 Marine Observers School RAF (1919)
- No. 1 Observers School RAF (1918) became No. 2 Marine Observers School RAF
- No. 1 Officers Advanced Training School RAF (1944–46) became Officers Advanced Training School RAF
- No. 1 Parachute and Glider Training School RAF (1947–50) became No. 1 Parachute School RAF
- No. 1 Parachute School RAF (1950–53) became No. 1 Parachute Training School RAF
- No. 1 Parachute Training School RAF (1944–47, 1953–)
- No. 1 School of Aerial Fighting (1917–18) became No. 1 School of Aerial Fighting and Gunnery RAF
- No. 1 School of Air Navigation RAF (1940) became No. 31 Air Navigation School RAF
- No. 1 School of Army Co-operation RAF (1939–41) became No. 41 OTU
- No. 1 School of General Reconnaissance RAF (1940) became No. 61 Air School SAAF
- No. 1 School of Photography RAF (1942–45) became School of Photography RAF
- No. 1 Torpedo Refresher School RAF (1943–44)
- No. 2 (Auxiliary) School of Aerial Gunnery (1917–18) became No. 1 School of Aerial Fighting and Gunnery RAF
- No. 2 Air Armament School RAF (1937–38, 1938–40) became No. 3 Ground Armament School RAF
- No. 2 Air Signallers School RAF (1952–53)
- No. 2 Aircrew Grading School RAF (1951–52)
- No. 2 Basic Air Navigation School RAF (1951–53)
- No. 2 Electrical and Wireless School RAF (1938–40) became No. 2 Signals School RAF
- No. 2 Grading School RAF (1951–52) became Airwork Grading Unit RAF
- No. 2 Marine Observers School RAF (1918–19)
- No. 2 Observers School RAF (1918–19) became No. 1 (Observers) School of Aerial Gunnery RAF
- No. 2 Officers Advanced Training School RAF (??-1946)
- No. 2 School of Aerial Fighting (1917–18) became No. 2 School of Aerial Fighting and Gunnery RAF
- No. 2 School of Air Navigation RAF (1940–42) became Central Navigation School RAF. Advance air party proceeded from St Athan to RAF Cranage in October 1940; courses commenced within a few days; disbanded by redesignation in 1942.
- No. 2 School of Army Co-operation RAF (1939–41) became No. 6 OTU
- No. 2 School of General Reconnaissance RAF (1940)
- No. 2 Torpedo Refresher School RAF (1943)
- No. 2 Wireless School RAF (1917–19)
- No. 24 Bombing, Gunnery and Air Navigation School RAF (1943–45)
- No. 29 Elementary Navigation and Air Gunnery School (Southern Rhodesia) RAF (1941–45)
- No. 3 (Auxiliary) School of Aerial Gunnery (1917–18) became No. 1 (Observer) School of Aerial Gunnery
- No. 3 Electrical and Wireless School RAF (1940) became No. 3 Signals School RAF
- No. 3 Radio Direction Finding School RAF (1942) became No. 11 Radio School RAF
- No. 9 Radio Direction Finding School RAF (1942) became No. 9 Radio School RAF
- No. 3 School of General Reconnaissance RAF (1940–46) became School of General Reconnaissance RAF
- No. 4 (Auxiliary) School of Aerial Gunnery RAF (1917–18) became No. 2 School of Aerial Fighting and Gunnery RAF
- No. 4 Parachute Training School RAF (1944–45)
- No. 93 Group Screened Pilots School RAF (1943–44)
- Advanced Air Firing School (1917–18)
- Advanced Bombing and Gunnery School (Middle East) RAF (1943–45)
- Aerial Erector School RAF
- Aerial Fighting and Gunnery School (1918–19)
- Aerial Fighting School, Heliopolis (1917–18) became No. 5 Fighting School RAF
- Air Armament School (1932–37) became No. 1 Air Armament School RAF
- Air Electronics and Air Engineers School (1967–76)
- Air Electronics School (1960–67) became Air Electronics and Air Engineers School
- Air Electronics, Engineer and Loadmaster School (1983–97) became Navigator and Airmen Aircrew School
- Air Fighting School (Middle East) (1941–42)
- Air Landing School (1941–44)
- Air Navigation and Bombing School (1944–45) became No. 5 Air Navigation School RAF
- Air Navigation School (1935–36) became School of Air Navigation
- Air Observation Post School (1950–53) became Light Aircraft School
- Air Observers School, North Coates (1936–37) became No. 2 Air Armament School RAF
- Air Pilotage School (1919–23, 1931–32, 1933–35) became Air Navigation School
- Airborne Interception School (1952) became No. 238 Operational Conversion Unit RAF
- Airborne Interception/Air-to-Surface Vessel School (1940) became No. 3 Radio School RAF
- Aircrew Officers Training School (1967–67)
- Airfield Controllers School (1942–48)
- All-Weather Fighter Leaders School (1950–58) became All-Weather Fighter Combat School
- Armament and Gunnery School (1922–32) became Air Armament School
- Artillery and Infantry Co-operation School (1917–18) became Royal Air Force and Army Co-operation School RAF
- Artillery Observation School, Egypt (1918–19)
- Artillery Observation School (1917–18) became Artillery Observation School, Egypt
- Blind Approach School (1940–??) became No. 1 Blind Approach School RAF
- Bomber Command Bombing School (1952–68) became Strike Command Bombing School
- Central Air Traffic Control School RAF (1963–)
- Central Gunnery School (1939–54) became Fighter Weapons School RAF and the Coastal Command Gunnery School RAF
- Central Landing School (1940) became Central Landing Establishment
- Central Navigation and Control School RAF (1950–63) became Central Air Traffic Control School RAF
- Central Navigation School RAF (1942–44, 1949–50) became Central Navigation and Control School RAF
- Central Squadron and Flight Commanders School (1945–46)
- Coastal Command Anti U-Boat Devices School RAF (1945)
- Coastal Command Flying Instructors School RAF (1945) became Coastal Command Instructors School RAF
- Coastal Command Gunnery School RAF (1955)
- Coastal Command Instructors School RAF (1945–46)
- Coastal Command Landplane Pilots Pool RAF (1939–40) became No. 1 (Coastal) Operational Training Unit RAF
- Coastal Command Tactical Development Unit RAF (1940) became Coastal Command Development Unit RAF
- Coastal Defence Development Unit (1935–36)
- Electrical and Wireless School (1919–38) became No. 1 Electrical and Wireless School RAF
- Empire Air Armament School (1944–49)
- Empire Air Navigation School (1944–49) became Central Navigation School RAF
- Empire Central Flying School (1954–46) became Empire Flying School
- Empire Flying School (1946–49)
- Empire Radio School, RAF Debden, (1946–49) became Royal Air Force Technical College, Signals Division
- Empire Test Pilots' School (1944–)
- Fighter Command Control and Reporting School (1945–53) became School of Control and Reporting RAF
- Fighter Leaders School (1943–44)
- Fighter Weapons School (1955–1958)
- Fleet School of Aerial Fighting and Gunnery (1918–20) became RAF Base, Leuchars
- Franco-Belgium Air Training School (1940–41)
- Grand Fleet School of Aerial Fighting and Gunnery (1918–??) became Fleet School of Aerial Fighting and Gunnery
- Ground Defence Gunners School (1939) between No. 1 Ground Defence Gunners School RAF
- Light Aircraft School RAF (1953–57) Control Passed to the Army Air Corps
- Machine Gun School (1915–16) became School of Aerial Gunnery
- Marine Observers School RAF, Aldeburgh (1918–19) became No. 1 Marine Observers School RAF
- Marine Observers School RAF, Leysdown (??-1918)
- Navigation School (1926–36) became School of Air Navigation RAF
- Navigation Training School RAF (1939–40)
- Observers School of Reconnaissance and Aerial Photography RAF (1918–19)
- Officers Advanced Training School (1944) became No. 1 Officers Advanced Training School RAF
- Parachute Training Centre (1940) became Central Landing School RAF
- Rhodesian Central Flying School (1941–42) became No. 33 Flying Instructors School RAF
- Royal Air Force (Belgian) Training School (1944–46) transferred to Belgian Air Force control
- Royal Air Force (Middle East) Central Gunnery School (1943–45)
- Royal Air Force and Army Co-operation School RAF (1918–19) became School of Army Co-operation RAF
- Royal Air Force and Navy Co-operation School (1919) became Royal Air Force Seaplane Establishment
- Royal Air Force School of Army Co-operation (1943–44) became School of Air Support RAF
- School for Anti-Submarine Inshore Patrol Observers RAF (1918) became Marine Observers School RAF
- School for Marine Operational Pilots RAF (1918–19)
- School for Wireless Operators (1916–17) became Wireless School
- School of Aerial Co-operation with Coastal Artillery RAF (1918–19) became Coastal Battery Co-operation School RAF
- School of Aerial Fighting (Canada) (1918)
- School of Aerial Fighting and Bomb Dropping RAF (1918) became No. 4 School of Aerial Fighting and Gunnery RAF
- School of Aerial Gunnery and Bombing (1921–22) became Armament and Gunnery School RAF
- School of Aerial Gunnery, (Canada) (1917–18) became School of Aerial Fighting (Canada)
- School of Aerial Gunnery, Aboukir (1917–18) became No. 5 Fighting School RAF
- School of Aerial Gunnery, Hythe (1916–17) became No. 1 (Auxiliary) School of Aerial Gunnery
- School of Aerial Gunnery, Loch Doon (1917–18)
- School of Aerial Navigation RAF (1920) became School of Naval Co-operation and Aerial Navigation RAF
- School of Air Navigation (1936–40) became No. 1 School of Air Navigation RAF
- School of Air Pilotage (1919) became Air Pilotage School RAF
- School of Air Sea Rescue (1943–45) became Survival and Rescue Training Unit RAF
- School of Air Support (1944–47) became School of Land/Air Warfare RAF
- School of Air Traffic Control (1946–50) became Central Navigation and Control School RAF
- School of Air Transport (1944–46)
- School of Army Co-operation (1919–20, 1920–39) became No. 1 School of Army Co-operation RAF
- School of Artillery Co-operation (Canada) (1918)
- School of Aviation Medicine RAF (1945–50) became RAF Institute of Aviation Medicine
- School of Control and Reporting RAF (1953–57) became School of Fighter Plotting RAF
- School of Fighter Control RAF (1957–61)
- School of General Reconnaissance (1938–40, 1946–47)
- School of Land/Air Warfare (1947–63) became Joint Warfare Establishment
- School of Naval Co-operation and Aerial Navigation (1920–28)
- School of Naval Co-operation (1919–20, 1923–39)
- School of Photography, Maps and Reconnaissance (1917–19) became Photographic Park, Farnborough RAF
- School of Photography RAF (1919–41, 1945–72)
- Specialised Low Attack Instructors School RAF (1942–44) became Fighter Leaders School RAF
- Staff Navigators School (Middle East) RAF (1944–45)
- Strike Command Bombing School RAF (1968–74)
- Temporary Air Observer's School RAF (1938)
- Test Pilots School RAF (1944) became Empire Test Pilots' School
- The Officers Advanced Training School RAF (1946–62) became Junior Command and Staff School
- Torpedo Aeroplane School RAF (1918) became No. 201 Training Depot Station RAF
- Torpedo Bombing School (1942) became No. 5 Middle East Training School RAF
- Torpedo Training School (1919–20)
- Wireless and Observers School, Brooklands (1916–17) became Artillery and Infantry Co-operation School
- Wireless and Observers School, Eqypt (1919)
- Wireless School, Brooklands (1916) became Wireless and Observers School, Brooklands
- Wireless School, Egypt (1918–19) became Wireless and Observers School, Eqypt
- Wireless Telephony School (1918)

Indian units

- No. 1 Air Gunnery School (India) RAF (1943–45)
- No. 3 Parachute Training School RAF (1944–47) passed to Indian Control
- Air Navigation School, India (1942) became General Reconnaissance and Air Navigation School RAF
- General Reconnaissance and Air Navigation School (India) (1942–44)
- General Reconnaissance School (1942) became General Reconnaissance and Air Navigation School (India)
- India Detachment, Chinese Air Force Cadet School (??-1946)
- Parachute Training School (India) (1941–42)
- Royal Air Force School, India (1921–22)
- Specialised Low Attack Instructors School (India) RAF (1943–45) became Ground Attack Training School RAF
- No. 1 School of Air Force Technical Training (India) RAF (1939-45)
- No. 2 School of Technical Training (India) RAF (1940 & 1943-46) became No. 2 School of Ground Training RAF
- No. 3 (Civilian) School of Technical Training (India) RAF (1943-44)
- No. 4 (Civilian) School of Technical Training (India) RAF (1943-44) became No. 4 School of Air Force Technical Training (India) RAF (1944-45)
- No. 5 (Civilian) School of Technical Training (India) RAF (1943-??) became No. 5 School of Technical Training (India) RAF (?-1945)
- No. 6 (Civilian) School of Technical Training (India) RAF (1943-44)
- No. 7 School of Technical Training (India) RAF (1943-44 & 19??-45) became No. 7 School of Air Force Technical Training (India) RAF (1944-??)
- No. 8 School of Air Force Technical Training (India) RAF (1944-45)
- No. 9 School of Air Force Technical Training (India) RAF (1943-44)
- No. 10 School of Air Force Technical Training (India) RAF (1944-46)
- No. 11 School of Air Force Technical Training (India) RAF (1943-45)
- No. 12 School of Air Force Technical Training (India) RAF (1943-45)
- No. 13 School of Air Force Technical Training (India) RAF (1943-44)
- No. 14 School of Technical Training (India) RAF (1944-46)
- No. 15 School of Air Force Technical Training (India) RAF (1945)

== Flying training schools ==
To train pilots for the Royal Air Force, there have been many flying training schools, which are listed here.

=== Numbered schools ===
British Flying Training School
- No. 1 British Flying Training School RAF (1941-45) [Mainly operated by contractors]
- No. 2 British Flying Training School RAF (1941-42) [Mainly operated by contractors]
- No. 3 British Flying Training School RAF (1941-45) [Mainly operated by contractors]
- No. 4 British Flying Training School RAF (1941-45) [Mainly operated by contractors]
- No. 5 British Flying Training School RAF (1941-45) [Mainly operated by contractors]
- No. 6 British Flying Training School RAF (1941-44) [Mainly operated by contractors]
- No. 7 British Flying Training School RAF (1942) [Mainly operated by contractors]

Central Flying School

- No. 2 Central Flying School RAF (1940–42) became No. 1 Flying Instructors School RAF

Advanced Flying School

- No. 201 Advanced Flying School RAF (1947–54) became No. 11 Flying Training School RAF
- No. 202 Advanced Flying School RAF (1947, 1951–54) became No. 7 Flying Training School RAF
- No. 203 Advanced Flying School RAF (1947–49, 1949–54) became No. 8 Flying Training School RAF
- No. 204 Advanced Flying School RAF (1947–52) became 'D' Squadron of No. 231 Operational Conversion Unit RAF
- No. 205 Advanced Flying School RAF (1950–54) became No. 4 Flying Training School RAF
- No. 206 Advanced Flying School RAF (1951–54) became No. 5 Flying Training School RAF
- No. 207 Advanced Flying School RAF (1951–54)
- No. 208 Advanced Flying School RAF (1951–54) became No. 10 Flying Training School RAF
- No. 209 Advanced Flying School RAF (1952–54) became No. 12 Flying Training School RAF
- No. 210 Advanced Flying School RAF (1952–54)
- No. 211 Advanced Flying School RAF (1952–54) became No. 211 Flying Training School RAF
- No. 215 Advanced Flying School RAF (1952–54)

Basic Flying Training School

- No. 1 Basic Flying Training School RAF (1950–53)
- No. 2 Basic Flying Training School RAF (1951–53)
- No. 3 Basic Flying Training School RAF (1951–53)
- No. 4 Basic Flying Training School RAF (1951–53)
- No. 5 Basic Flying Training School RAF (1952–53)

(Basic) Flying Training School

- 2 (Basic) (1966-70) & 3 (Basic) (1966-84)

(Advanced) Flying Training School

- 4 (Advanced) (1966-), 5 (Advanced) (1966-74), 6 (Advanced) (1966-68), 8 (Advanced) (1951-53), 9 (Advanced) (1951-53), 10 (Advanced) (1952-54), 14 (Advanced) (1952-53)

Elementary and Reserve Flying Training School

Elementary Flying Training School

Flying Instructors School

- 1 (1942) became 1 (Advanced) (1942) became No. 18 (Pilots) Advanced Flying Unit RAF
- 2 (1940, 1942) became 2 (Advanced) (1942–45)
- 3 (Advanced) (1942–45)
- 4 (Supplementary) (1940–42) became 4 (1942) became 4 (Elementary) (1942–43)
- 5 (Supplementary) (1941–42) became 5 (1942) became 5 (Elementary) (1942)
- 6 (Supplementary) (1941–42) became 6 (1942) became 6 (Elementary) (1942) became No. 2 Elementary Flying Training School RAF
- 7 (1942) became 7 (Advanced) (1942–46) became Central Flying School
- 10 (Elementary) (1942–46) became Central Flying School
- 11 (1944–47)
- 12 (Operational) (1944–45) became Coastal Command Flying Instructors School RAF
- 33 Southern Rhodesia (1942–44) became Central Flying School, Southern Rhodesia

Flying Refresher School

- No. 101 Flying Refresher School RAF (1951–52) became No. 215 Advanced Flying School RAF
- No. 102 Flying Refresher School RAF (1951) became No. 207 Advanced Flying School RAF
- No. 103 Flying Refresher School RAF (1951) became No. 207 Advanced Flying School RAF
- No. 104 Flying Refresher School RAF (1951–52) became No. 6 Air Navigation School RAF

Flying Training School

- 1, 2, 3, 4, 5, 6, 7, 8, 9, 10, 11, 12, 13, 14, 15, 19, 20, 21, 22, 207, 211

Refresher School

- No. 1 Refresher School RAF (1946–47) became No. 1 (Pilots) Refresher Flying Unit RAF
- Refresher Flying Training School RAF (1942) became No. 1 Refresher Flying Training School RAF
- No. 1 Refresher Flying Training School RAF (1942)

Reserve Flying School

School of Special Flying

- No. 1 School of Special Flying RAF (1918) became Southwestern Area Flying Instructors School RAF
- No. 2 School of Special Flying RAF (1918) became Northeastern Area Flying Instructors School RAF

Service Flying Training School

- 1 (1939-42), 2 (1939-42), 3 (1939-42 & 1945-47), 4 (1939-41), 5 (1939-42), 6 (1939-42 & 1945-47), 7 (1939-41 & 1944-48), 8 (1939-42), 9 (1939-42),
  10 (1939-40), 11 (1939-42), 12 (1939-42), 13 (1939), 14 (1939-42), 15 (1939-42), 16 (Polish) (1941-46), 17 (1944-46), 20 (1946-47), 21 RATG (1940-45),
  22 (1942-48), 22 RATG (1941-45), 23 RATG (1941-45), 31, Canada (1940-44), 32, Canada (1940-44), 33, Canada (1940-44), 34, Canada (1941-44),
  35, Canada (1941-44), 36, Canada (1941-44), 37, Canada (1941-44), 38, Canada (1942-44), 39, Canada (1941-44), 41, Canada (1942-44)

=== Other schools ===
- Central Flying School (Southern Rhodesia) RAF (1944–45)
- Defence Helicopter Flying School (1997–2020)
- Elementary and Reserve Flying Training School, Kenya RAF (1940) became No. 30 Elementary Flying Training School RAF
- Empire Flying School (1946–49) became Royal Air Force Flying College
- Flying Instructors School, El Khanka RAF (1918–19)
- Flying Instructors School, The Curragh RAF (1918–19)
- Flying Instructors School, Upavon RAF (1919–20) became Central Flying School
- Flying Instructors Training School RAF (1943–44) became No. 11 Flying Instructors School RAF
- Flying Refresher School RAF (1949–51) became No. 101 Flying Refresher School RAF
- Joint Elementary Flying Training School (1993–)
- Midland Area Flying Instructors School (1918–19)
- Midland Area School of Special Flying RAF (1918) became Midland Area Flying Instructors School RAF
- Netheravon Flying School (1919) became No. 1 Flying Training School RAF
- Northeastern Area Flying Instructors School RAF (1918–19)
- Northern Area Flying Instructors School RAF (1919–20)
- Northwestern Area Flying Instructors School RAF (1918–19)
- Refresher Flying Training School RAF (1942) became No. 1 Refresher Flying Training School RAF
- Reserve Flying School, Brough (1924–35) became No. 4 Elementary and Reserve Flying Training School RAF
- Reserve Flying School, Coventry (1923–31) became Reserve Flying School, Hamble
- Reserve Flying School, Filton (1923–35) became No. 2 Elementary and Reserve Flying Training School RAF
- Reserve Flying School, Hamble (1931–35) became No. 3 Elementary and Reserve Flying Training School RAF
- Reserve Flying School, Renfrew (1924–28)
- Reserve Flying School, Stag Lane (1923–35) became No. 1 Elementary and Reserve Flying Training School RAF
- Royal Air Force College Service Flying Training School (1939–44) became No. 17 Service Flying Training School RAF
- Royal Air Force Liaison Office, Chinese Elementary Flying Training School (1943–46)
- Royal Navy Elementary Flying Training School (1973–93) became Joint Elementary Flying Training School
- School of Refresher Flying RAF (1962–77) became Refresher Flying Squadron RAF
- School of Special Flying (Canada) RAF (1918)
- School of Special Flying, Gosport RAF (1917) became No. 1 School of Special Flying RAF
- Southeastern Area Flying Instructors School RAF (1918–19)
- Southwestern Area Flying Instructors School RAF (1918–19)

Indian Flying training schools

- No. 1 (Indian) Flying Training School RAF (1940-41) became No. 1 (Indian) Service Flying Training School RAF (1941-46)
- Advanced Flying School (India) RAF (1946–47)
- Central Flying School (India) RAF (1944–45)
- Flying Instructors School (India) RAF (1944) became Central Flying School (India) RAF

== Gliding schools ==
As well as powered aircraft, the Royal Air Force has operated a large number of gliders both for military tasks and for Cadet training.

- Central Gliding School

== See also ==
Royal Air Force

- List of Royal Air Force aircraft squadrons
- List of Royal Air Force aircraft independent flights
- List of conversion units of the Royal Air Force
- List of Royal Air Force Glider units
- List of Royal Air Force Operational Training Units
- List of Royal Air Force units & establishments
- List of RAF squadron codes
- List of RAF Regiment units
- List of Battle of Britain squadrons
- List of wings of the Royal Air Force
- Royal Air Force roundels

Fleet Air Arm

- List of Fleet Air Arm aircraft squadrons
- List of Fleet Air Arm groups
- List of aircraft units of the Royal Navy
- List of aircraft wings of the Royal Navy

Others

- List of Air Training Corps squadrons
- University Air Squadron
- Air Experience Flight
- Volunteer Gliding Squadron
- United Kingdom military aircraft registration number
- United Kingdom aircraft test serials
- British military aircraft designation systems
