= List of de Havilland Vampire operators =

List of operators of the de Havilland Vampire:

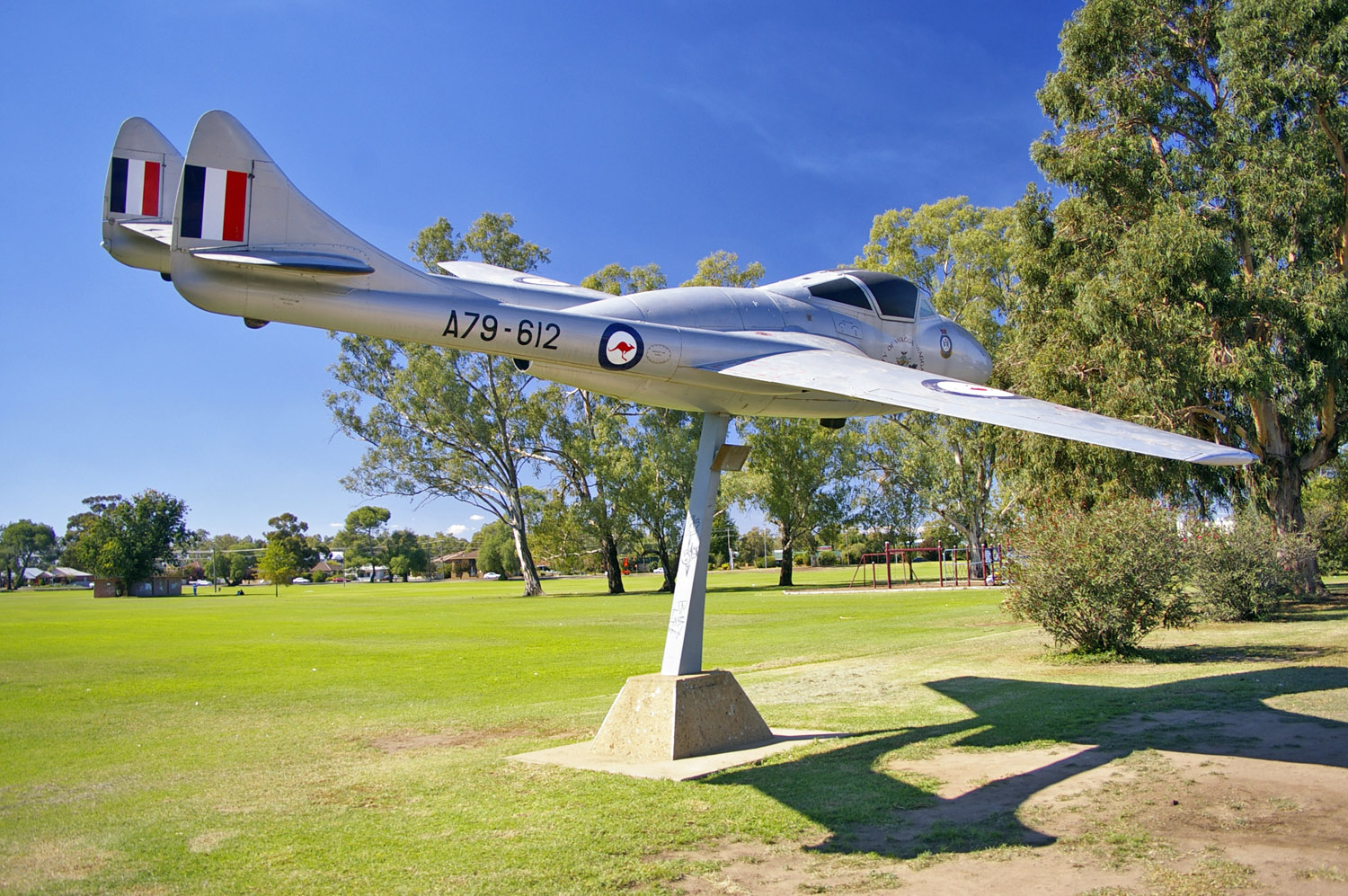
de Havilland Vampire T.35 (A79-612) in Wagga Wagga, New South Wales, Australia

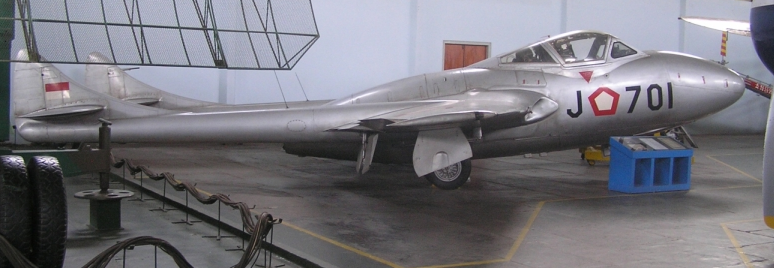
Vampire T.11 in Indonesian Air Force markings at Dirgantara Mandala Museum

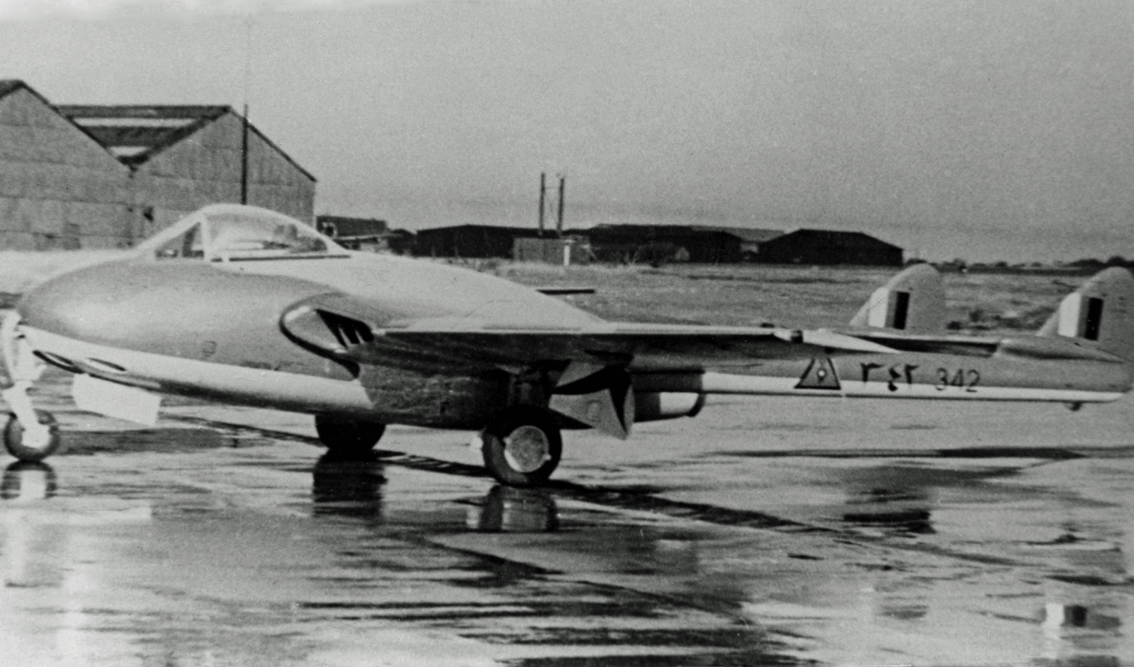
An Iraqi Air Force De Havilland Vampire FB.52, before delivery in 1953

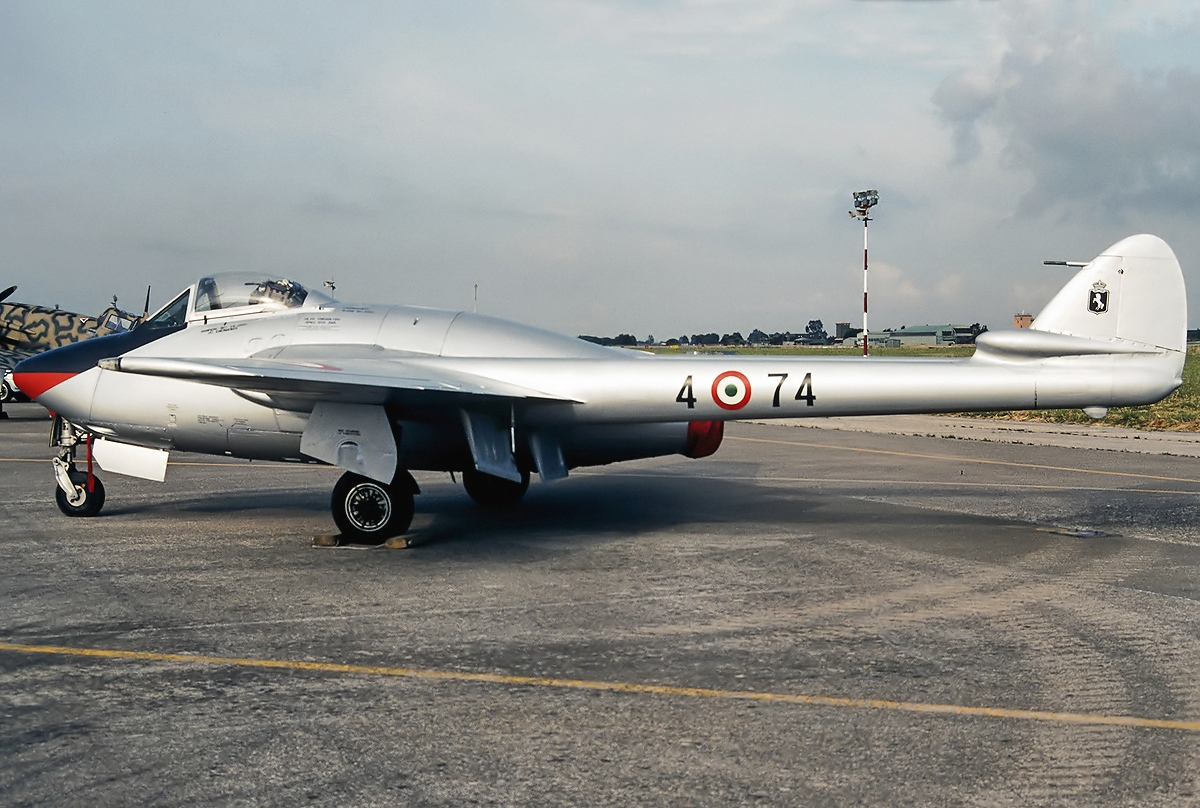
Italian Air Force De Havilland DH-100 Vampire

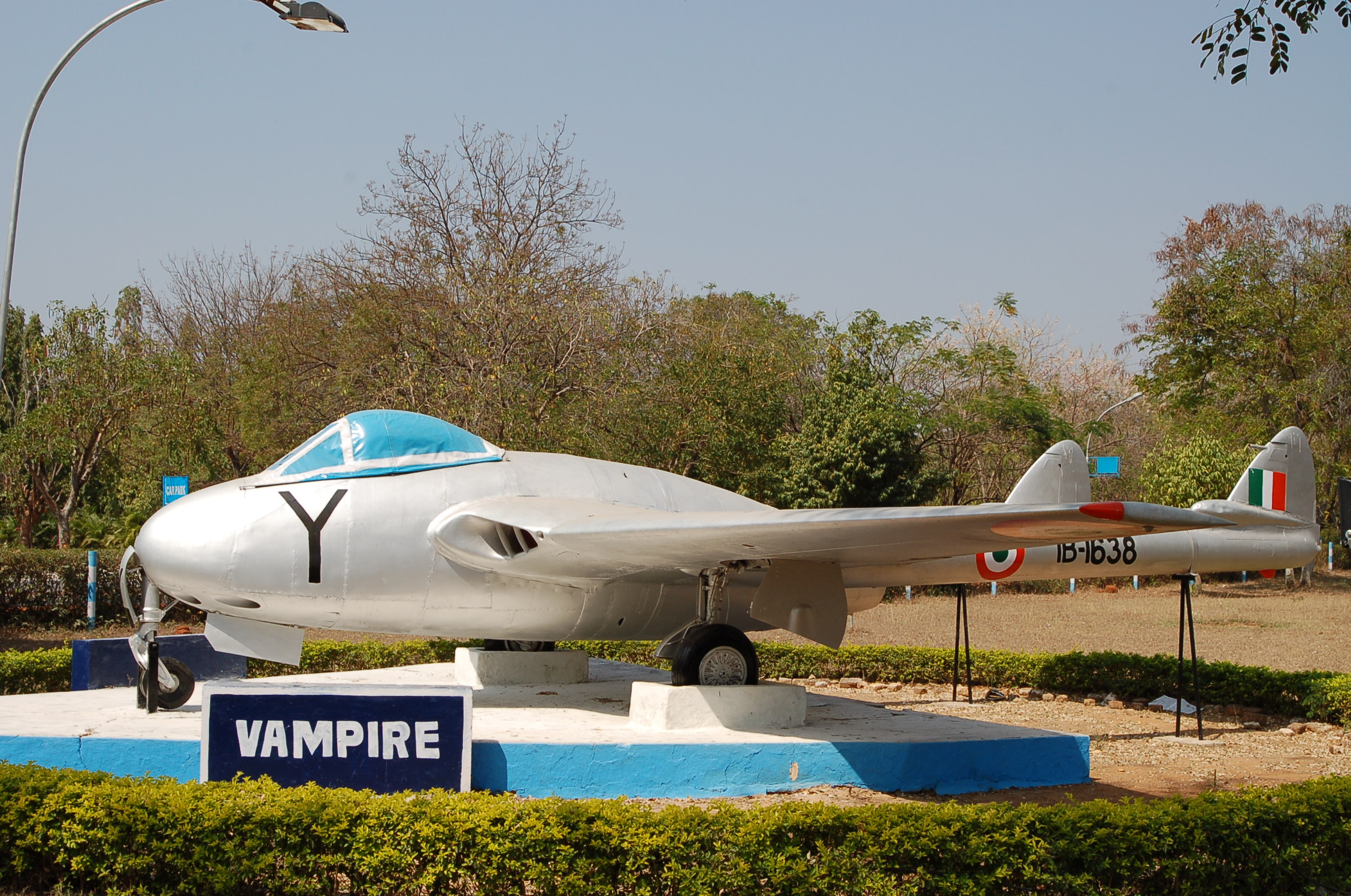
Hindustan DH-100 Vampire preserved at the Indian Air Force Academy Museum at Dundigal, Hyderabad, India

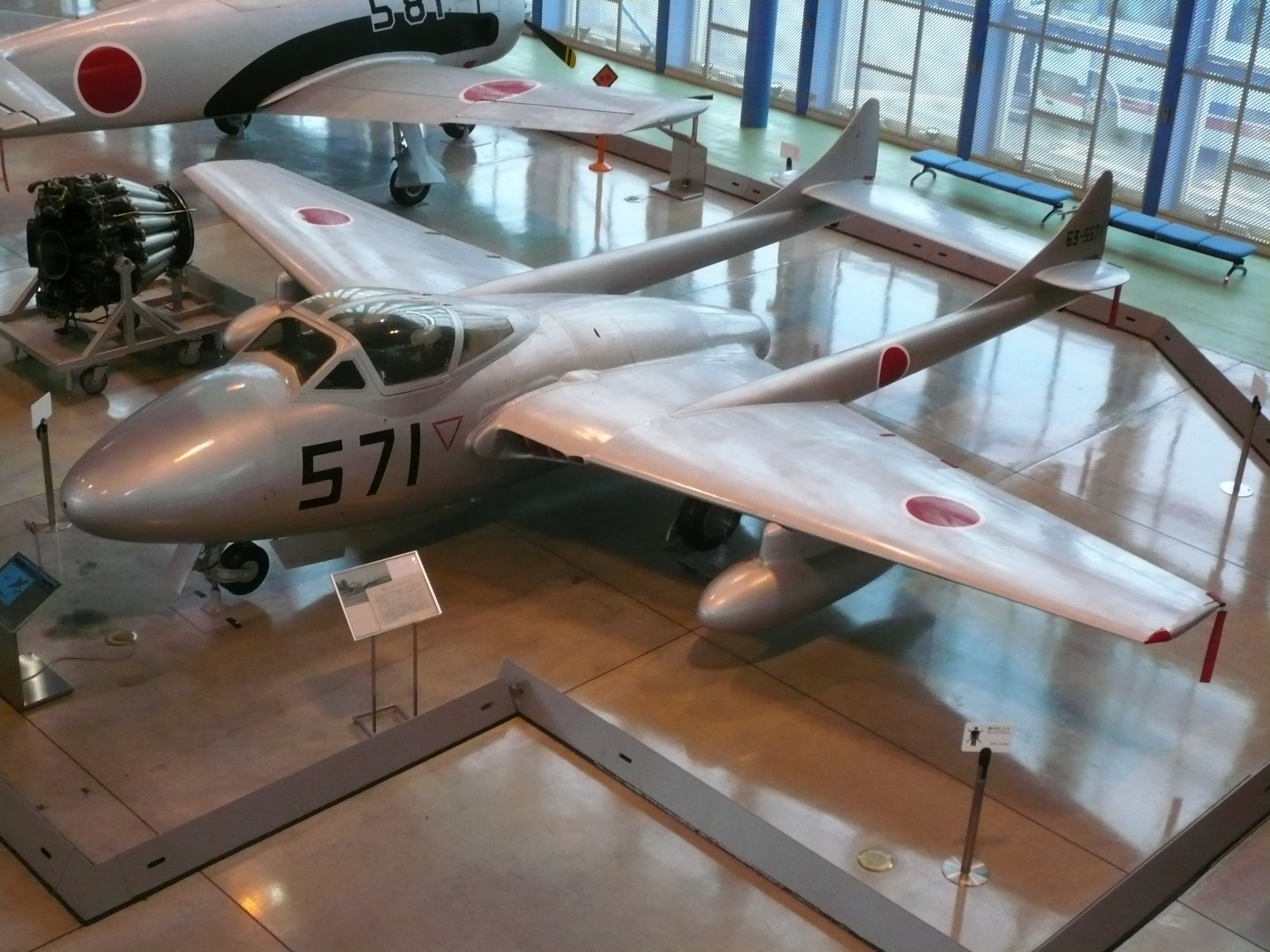
Vampire at Hamamatsu Air Base Publication Center

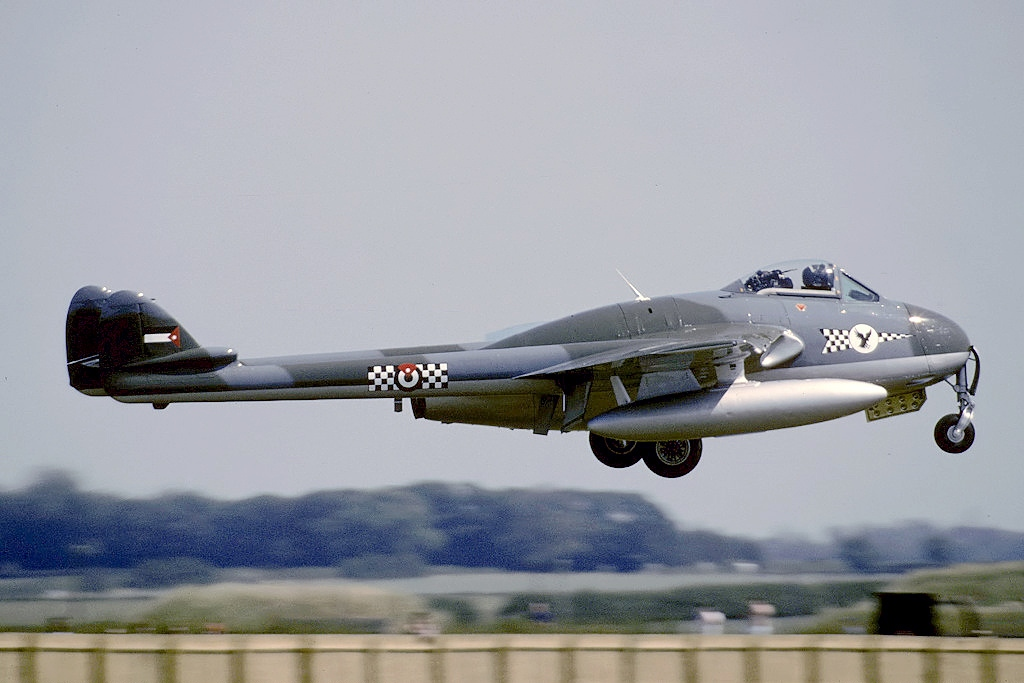
Markings of the Royal Jordanian Air Force

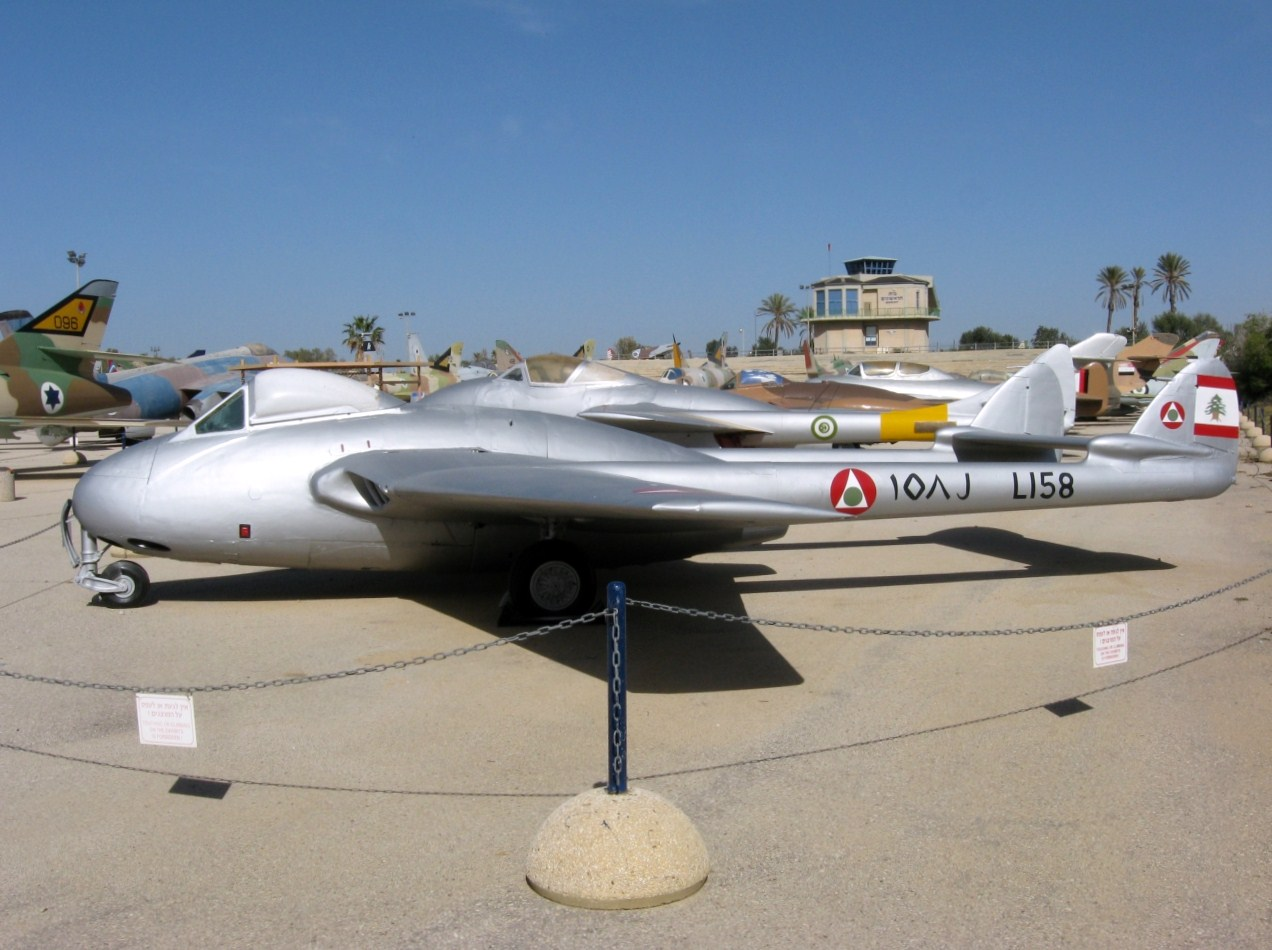
Vampire bearing Lebanese colours at Hatzerim, Israel

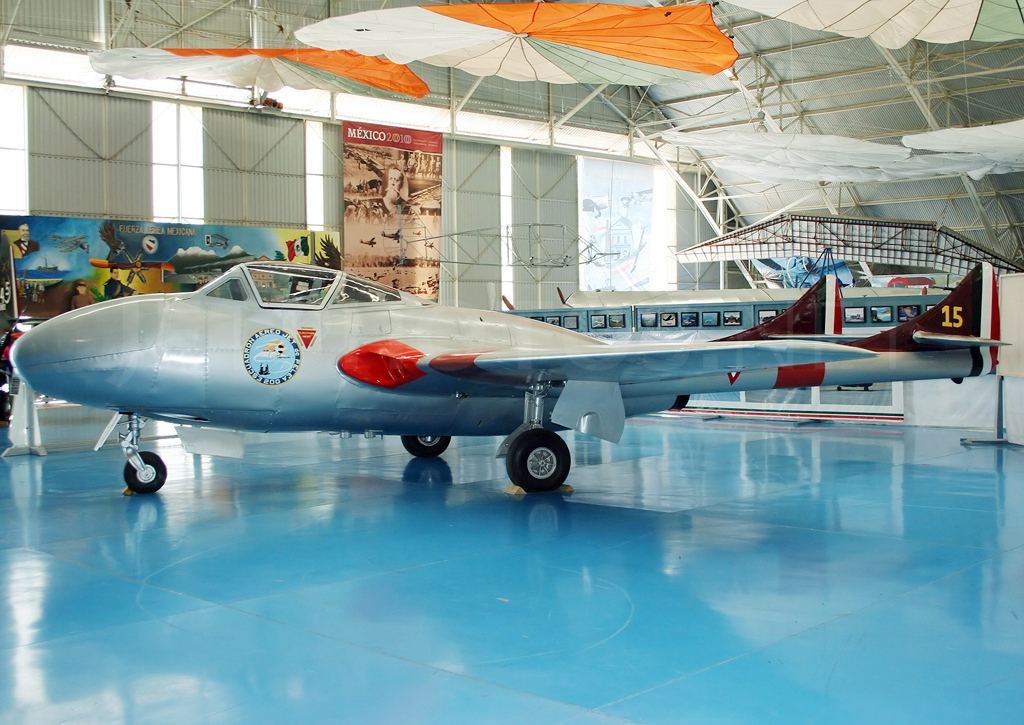
Mexico Air Force Vampire

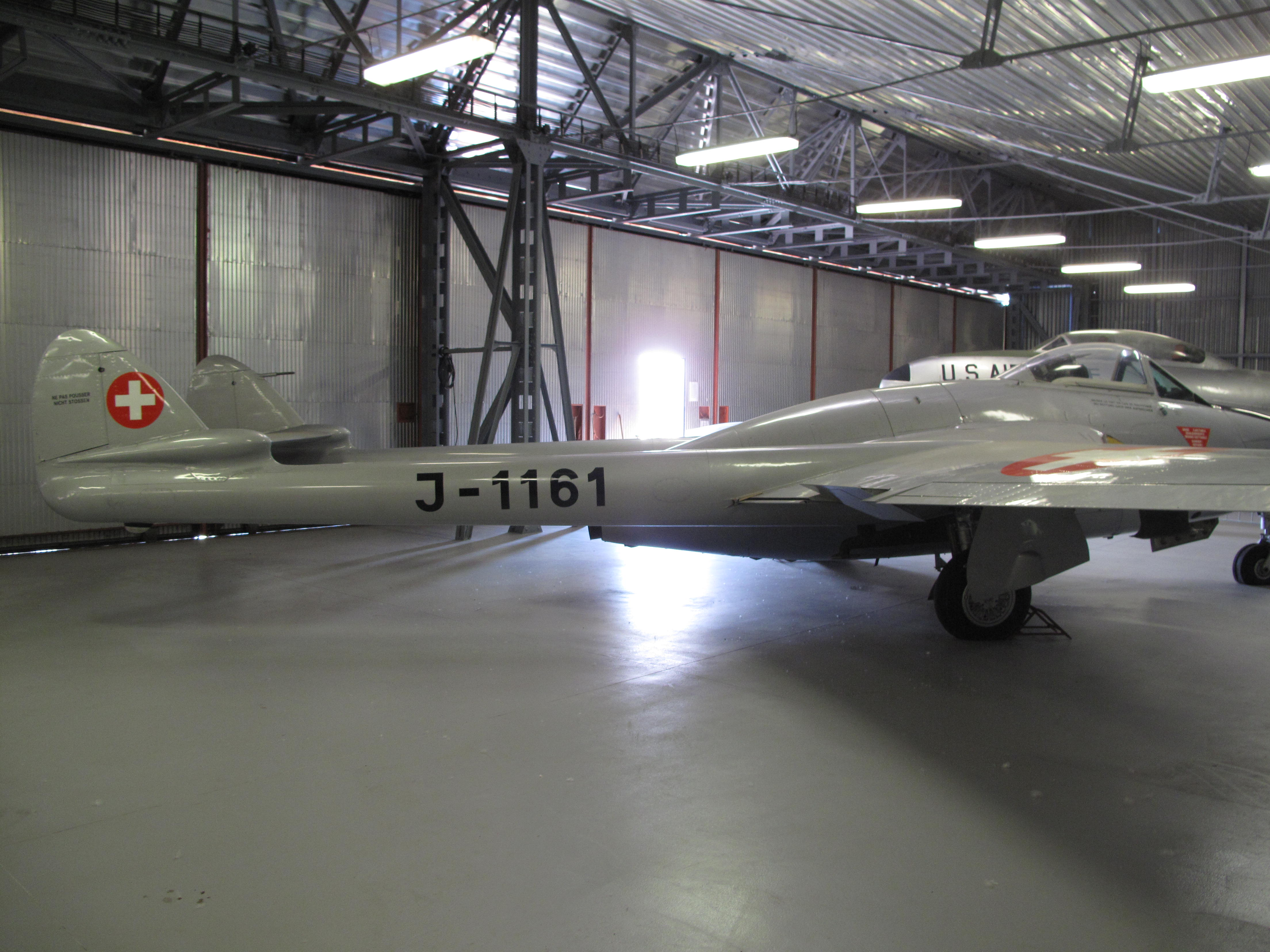
Swiss Air Force Vampire at Letecké muzeum Kbely

Austria

- Österreichische Luftstreitkräfte

Australia

- Royal Australian Air Force
  - No. 21 Squadron RAAF
  - No. 22 Squadron RAAF
  - No. 23 Squadron RAAF
  - No. 25 Squadron RAAF
  - No. 75 Squadron RAAF
  - No. 76 Squadron RAAF
  - No. 1 Advanced Flying Training School RAAF
  - No. 2 Operational Conversion Unit RAAF
  - No. 5 Operational Training Unit RAAF
  - Central Flying School RAAF
- Fleet Air Arm
  - 723 Squadron RAN
  - 724 Squadron RAN

Burma

- Burmese Air Force 1954–1978, 8 x T.55s

Canada

- Royal Canadian Air Force (operational and air reserve units: 400, 401, 402, 411, 438, 442 squadrons and Central Flying School)
  - No. 421 Squadron RCAF
  - No. 442 Squadron RCAF

Ceylon

- Royal Ceylon Air Force 1954, 3 x T.55s delivered but not used and returned to de Havilland still crated, order for further T.55s and FB.52s cancelled.

Chile

- Fuerza Aérea de Chile

Congo

Dominican Republic

- Fuerza Aérea de Republica Dominicana operated 25 ex-Swedish F.1s and 17 ex-Swedish FB.50s.

Egypt

- Egyptian Air Force

Finland

- Suomen Ilmavoimat

France

- Armee de l'Air
- Aeronavale

India

- Indian Air Force
- Indian Naval Air Arm

Indonesia

- Indonesian Air Force operated eight T.55s between 1956 and 1963. All aircraft were sold to Indian Air Force in 1963.
  - 11th Air Squadron

Iraq

- Iraqi Air Force took delivery of 12 FB.52s fighters and 10 T.55 trainers between 1953 and 1955. These aircraft were affected to No. 5 Squadron. At least one T.55 was donated to Somalia in 1964.

Ireland

- Irish Air Corps operated six T.55 trainers between 1956 and 1976

Italy

- Italian Air Force operated 268 Vampire from 1949 until 1960

Japan

- Japan Air Self-Defense Force received one Vampire T.55 trainer for evaluation in 1955.

Jordan

- Royal Jordanian Air Force

Katanga

- Katangese Air Force operated two ex-Portuguese T.11s.

Lebanon

- Lebanese Air Force

Mexico

- Fuerza Aérea Mexicana retired their Vampires in 1967

New Zealand

- Royal New Zealand Air Force
  - No. 14 Squadron RNZAF
  - No. 75 Squadron RNZAF

Norway

- Royal Norwegian Air Force
  - No. 336 Squadron RNoAF
  - No. 337 Squadron RNoAF
  - No. 339 Squadron RNoAF
  - Jet Training Wing

Portugal

- Força Aérea Portuguesa Two T.55 trainers.

Rhodesia

- Rhodesian Air Force / Royal Rhodesian Air Force - No. 2 Squadron operated Vampire FB.9s and T.55s

Saudi Arabia

- Royal Saudi Air Force - 15 former Egyptian FB.52s delivered in 1957 and withdrawn in 1958.
  - No. 5 Squadron

Somalia

- Somali Air Force

South Africa

- South African Air Force

Sweden

- Flygvapnet operated 70 F.1 (designated J 28A); 310 FB.50 (J 28B) and 57 T.55 (J 28C) aircraft.

Switzerland

- Schweizerische Flugwaffe Kommando der Flieger und Fliegerabwehrtruppen (Flugwaffe)

Syria

- Syrian Air Force

United Kingdom

- Royal Air Force
  - No. 3 Squadron RAF F.1
  - No. 4 Squadron RAF FB.5, FB.9
  - No. 5 Squadron RAF F.3, FB.5
  - No. 6 Squadron RAF FB.5, FB.9
  - No. 8 Squadron RAF FB.9
  - No. 11 Squadron RAF FB.5
  - No. 14 Squadron RAF FB.5
  - No. 16 Squadron RAF FB.5
  - No. 20 Squadron RAF F.1, F.3, FB.5, FB.9
  - No. 23 Squadron RAF NF.10
  - No. 25 Squadron RAF NF.10
  - No. 26 Squadron RAF FB.5, FB.9
  - No. 28 Squadron RAF FB.5, FB.9
  - No. 32 Squadron RAF F.3, FB.5, FB.9
  - No. 45 Squadron RAF FB.9
  - No. 54 Squadron RAF F.1, F.3, FB.5
  - No. 60 Squadron RAF FB.5, FB.9
  - No. 67 Squadron RAF FB.5
  - No. 71 Squadron RAF FB.5
  - No. 72 Squadron RAF F.1, F.3, FB.5
  - No. 73 Squadron RAF F.3. FB.5, FB.9
  - No. 93 Squadron RAF FB.5
  - No. 94 Squadron RAF FB.5
  - No. 98 Squadron RAF FB.5
  - No. 112 Squadron RAF FB.5
  - No. 118 Squadron RAF FB.5
  - No. 130 Squadron RAF F.1
  - No. 145 Squadron RAF FB.5
  - No. 151 Squadron RAF NF.10
  - No. 185 Squadron RAF FB.5
  - No. 213 Squadron RAF FB.5, FB.9
  - No. 234 Squadron RAF FB.5, FB.9
  - No. 247 Squadron RAF F.1, F.3, FB.5
  - No. 249 Squadron RAF FB.5, FB.9
  - No. 266 Squadron RAF FB.5
  - No. 501 Squadron RAF F.1, FB.5, FB.9
  - No. 502 Squadron RAF F.3, FB.5, FB.9
  - No. 595 Squadron RAF F.1
  - No. 601 Squadron RAF F.3
  - No. 602 Squadron RAF FB.5
  - No. 603 Squadron RAF FB.5
  - No. 604 Squadron RAF F.3
  - No. 605 Squadron RAF F.1, F.3, FB.5
  - No. 607 Squadron RAF FB.5
  - No. 608 Squadron RAF F.1, F.3, FB.5, FB.9
  - No. 609 Squadron RAF FB.5
  - No. 612 Squadron RAF FB.5
  - No. 613 Squadron RAF F.1, FB.5, FB.9
  - No. 614 Squadron RAF F.3, FB.5, FB.9
  - No. 631 Squadron RAF F.1
  - No. 202 Advanced Flying School RAF FB.5 & T.11 (1951–54)
  - No. 203 Advanced Flying School RAF F.1, FB.5 & FB.9 (1949–54)
  - No. 206 Advanced Flying School RAF FB.5 (1954)
  - No. 208 Advanced Flying School RAF F.1, FB.5, FB.9 & T.11 (1951–54)
  - No. 210 Advanced Flying School RAF FB.5 (1952–54)
  - No. 226 Operational Conversion Unit RAF F.1, FB.5 & T.11 (1946–50)
  - No. 229 Operational Conversion Unit RAF F.1, FB.5 & T.11 (1950-?)
  - No. 233 Operational Conversion Unit RAF FB.5, FB.9 & T.11 (1952–57)
  - No. 1 Flying Training School RAF T.11 (1955-?)
  - No. 3 Flying Training School RAF T.11 (1966-?)
  - No. 4 Flying Training School RAF T.11 (1954-58 & 1960-?)
  - No. 5 Flying Training School RAF FB.5, FB.9 & T.11 (1954–62)
  - No. 7 Flying Training School RAF FB.5, FB.9 & T.11 (1954-60 & 1962–66)
  - No. 8 Flying Training School RAF FB.5 & T.11 (1955–64)
  - No. 9 Flying Training School RAF FB.5 & T.11 (1954–55)
  - No. 10 Flying Training School RAF FB.5 & T.11 (1954)
  - No. 11 Flying Training School RAF T.11 (1954–55)
  - No. 102 Flying Refresher School RAF F.1 & FB.5 (1951)
  - No. 103 Flying Refresher School RAF F.1 & FB.5 (1951)
- Central Flying School
- Royal Air Force College F.1, FB.9 T.11
- Central Air Traffic Control School RAF T.11
- Central Navigation and Control School RAF FB.5, NF.10 & T.11 (1949–50)
- Fleet Air Arm
  - 700 Naval Air Squadron F.20, T.22
  - 702 Naval Air Squadron F.20, T.22
  - 703 Naval Air Squadron F.20, F.21
  - 718 Naval Air Squadron T.22
  - 724 Naval Air Squadron T.22
  - 727 Naval Air Squadron T.22
  - 728 Naval Air Squadron F.20
  - 736 Naval Air Squadron T.22
  - 750 Naval Air Squadron T.22
  - 759 Naval Air Squadron F.20, T.22
  - 764 Naval Air Squadron F.20, F.21, T.22
  - 766 Naval Air Squadron T.22
  - 771 Naval Air Squadron F.20, F.21
  - 781 Naval Air Squadron T.22
  - 787 Naval Air Squadron F.20
  - 802 Naval Air Squadron T.22
  - 806 Naval Air Squadron F.20, T.22
  - 808 Naval Air Squadron T.22
  - 809 Naval Air Squadron T.22
  - 831 Naval Air Squadron T.22
  - 890 Naval Air Squadron T.22
  - 891 Naval Air Squadron T.22
  - 892 Naval Air Squadron T.22
  - 893 Naval Air Squadron T.22
  - 1831 Naval Air Squadron T.22
  - 1832 Naval Air Squadron T.22

Venezuela

- Fuerza Aérea Venezolana

Zimbabwe

- Zimbabwe Air Force - No. 2 Squadron operated Vampire FB.9s and T.55s. They were replaced by BAe Hawks in the 1980s.
