= Ponca City Regional Airport =

Airport in Oklahoma, United States

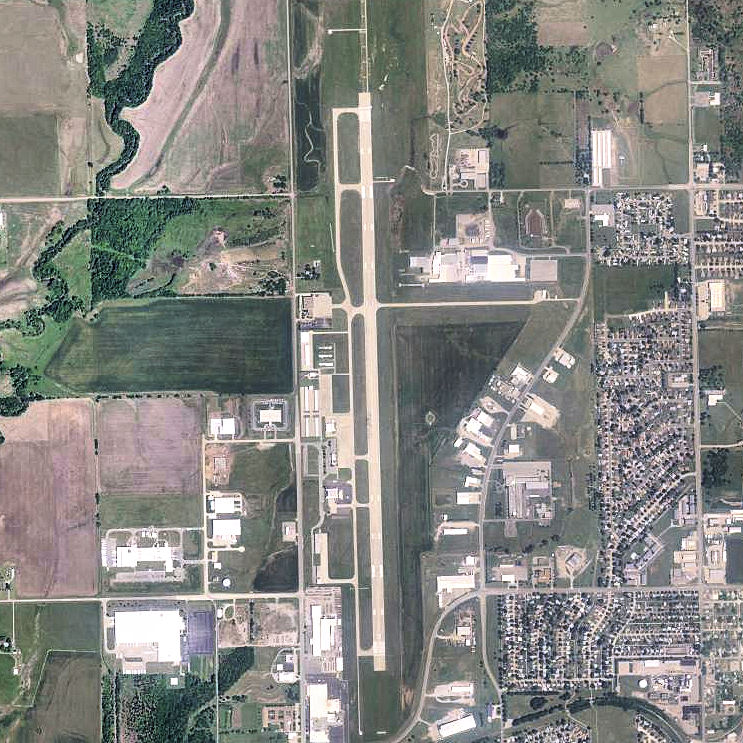
- USGS 2006 orthophoto
- IATA: PNC; ICAO: KPNC; FAA LID: PNC

Summary
- Airport type: Public
- Owner: City of Ponca City
- Serves: Ponca City, Oklahoma
- Elevation AMSL: 1,008 ft (307 m)
- Coordinates: 36°43′55″N 097°05′59″W

Map
- Location within Oklahoma Location within the United States

Runways
Direction	Length		Surface
Direction	ft	m	Surface
17/35	7,201	2,195	Concrete

Statistics (2008)
- Aircraft operations: 61,500
- Based aircraft: 64
- Source: Federal Aviation Administration

Ponca City Regional Airport (IATA: PNC, ICAO: KPNC, FAA LID: PNC) is a city-owned airport two miles northwest of Ponca City, in Kay County, Oklahoma, United States.

Scheduled passenger flights on Great Lakes Airlines to Denver and Dodge City ended in August, 2006. The service was subsidized by the Essential Air Service program.

== History ==
The January 1938 directory says Ponca City's airport was sod, a half-mile square. A 1937 aerial photo reveals that there were two sod runways within this square, arranged in an "X" configuration. In November 1938, a 3,600-foot (1,100 m) concrete runway opened. The United States Army Air Forces took over the facility in the summer of 1941 and used it as part of the British Flying Training School Program. This training was part of the Lend-Lease act where Royal Air Force flying cadets received a 20-week basic flying course taught by civil contractors. The Darr School of Aeronautics provided flight training.

Ponca City was designated No6 British Flying Training School. PT17a Boeing Stearmans were the primary basic trainer, with the North American AT6A "Harvard" the Advanced Trainer used at the airfield between 1941 and 1944. An intermediate trainer, the Vultee BT13A, was also employed between 1941 and 1943 before being phased out. On average RAF cadet pilots completed 70 hours primary flying hours followed by 130 hours advanced training on the Harvard. Most courses lasted six months, and consisted of 80 RAF cadet pilots and 20 USAAF cadet pilots.

In November 1942, Royal Air Force training ended at Miami and the airfield became a primary (stage 1) pilot training airfield assigned to AAF Flying Training Command, Gulf Coast Training Center (later Central Flying Training Command). The civil instructors were retained under USAAF control by the 323d Flying Training Detachment.

Pilot training at the airfield apparently ended on May 30, 1944, with the reduced demand for new pilots. The airfield was returned to the local government at the end of the war.

=== Historical airline service ===
Airline service to Ponca City began in the late 1920s when National Air Transport, d/b/a as United Airlines flew from Chicago to Dallas via Burlington, IA, Kansas City, Wichita, Ponca City, Oklahoma City, and Fort Worth. Braniff Airways, later known as Braniff International Airways, took this route over in 1934. Braniff resumed flights to Ponca City in 1946.

Central Airlines replaced Braniff in 1953–54, using Douglas DC-3s and, in the 1960s, 40-seat Convair 600s. In 1967, Central merged with Frontier Airlines (1950-1986) and Frontier continued to serve Ponca City with the 50-seat Convair 580. Frontier ended their service in 1979 after the passing of the Airline Deregulation Act and Ponca City then only saw service by small commuter airlines.

Air Midwest served Ponca City from 1979 until 1981 with nonstop Fairchild Swearingen Metroliner II's to Wichita and one-stops to Oklahoma City.

Metro Airlines served from 1981 to 1986 with one-stop de Havilland Canada DHC-6 Twin Otters to Oklahoma City.

Exec Express began service in 1986 with Piper PA-31 Navajos to Tulsa. Exec Express changed names three times over the next ten years, first to Exec Express II in 1988, then Lone Star Airlines in 1991, and finally Aspen Mountain Air in 1996. Service switched from Tulsa to Dallas/Fort Worth by the late 1980s and Fairchild Swearingen Metroliners replaced the Navajos. The airline went out of business in late 1998.

Big Sky Airlines took over serving Ponca City in 1999 with flights to Dallas/Fort Worth and to Denver with one stop at Enid, Oklahoma. Big Sky also used Metroliners but ended service in 2002.

Mesa Airlines followed from 2002 to 2005 with Beechcraft 1900Ds to Dallas/Fort Worth and Denver.

Great Lakes Airlines was the final carrier at Ponca City, in 2005–2006 with one stop Beechcraft 1900Ds to Denver.

Passengers now prefer to drive to larger cities for air travel; Ponca City has not seen airline service since August, 2006.

== Facilities ==
The airport covers 500 acres (202 ha) at an elevation of 1,008 feet (307 m). Its single runway, 17/35, is 7,201 by 150 feet (2,195 x 46 m) concrete.

In the year ending August 26, 2008 the airport had 61,500 aircraft operations, average 168 per day: 93% general aviation and 7% military. 64 aircraft were then based at this airport: 91% single-engine, 5% multi-engine, 3% jet, and 2% ultralight.

There are multiple hangars on the grounds, and the Northern Oklahoma Flight Academy is based there.

Enrique's is a Mexican restaurant in the terminal.

== See also ==
- Oklahoma World War II Army Airfields
- List of airports in Oklahoma
- 31st Flying Training Wing (World War II)

== Other sources ==
- This article incorporates public domain material from the Air Force Historical Research Agency
- Shaw, Frederick J. (2004), Locating Air Force Base Sites History's Legacy, Air Force History and Museums Program, United States Air Force, Washington DC, 2004.
- Essential Air Service documents (Docket OST-1997-2401) from the U.S. Department of Transportation:
  - Order 2002-7-2 (July 5, 2002): selecting Air Midwest, Inc., to provide essential air service at seven communities (El Dorado/Camden, AR; Jonesboro, AR; Harrison, AR; Hot Springs, AR; Enid, OK; Ponca City, OK; Brownwood, TX) for a two-year period at subsidy rates totaling $6,693,881 annually.
  - Order 2004-6-12 (June 17, 2004): requests interested persons to show cause why it should not terminate the essential air service subsidy eligibility of Jonesboro, Arkansas, Enid and Ponca City, Oklahoma, and Brownwood, Texas, and allow Air Midwest to suspend its subsidized services at those communities as of October 1, 2004, when the current rate term expires.
  - Order 2005-1-14 (January 25, 2004): selecting Air Midwest, Inc., to provide essential air service at El Dorado/Camden, Jonesboro, Harrison and Hot Springs, Arkansas, at a subsidy rate of $4,155,550 annually for a two-year rate term, selecting Great Lakes Aviation, Ltd., to provide essential air service at Enid and Ponca City, Oklahoma at a subsidy rate of $1,272,557 annually for allowing Air Midwest to discontinue its service there, if it chooses to do so.
  - Order 2006-7-25 (August 1, 2006): terminating the essential air service subsidy eligibility of Enid and Ponca City, Oklahoma, and allowing Great Lakes Aviation, Ltd., to suspend service at the two communities as of September 1, 2006, if it chooses.
