= British Flying Training School Program =

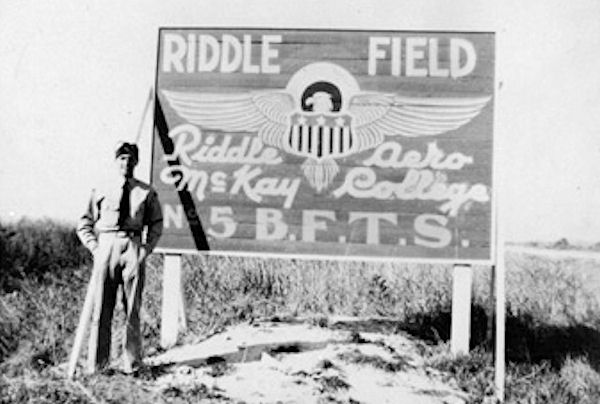
No. 5 BFTS, Riddle Field, Clewiston, FL

At the beginning of the Second World War the United Kingdom recognised that it would need to train a large number of pilots. A number of flying and aircrew training schools were set up across the world, primarily in British Empire and Commonwealth countries where pilots could be trained without risk of enemy interference. In addition, British Flying Training Schools (BFTS) were set up in the United States of America from 1941 as a result of the Lend Lease Bill.

== Locations ==
British Flying Training Schools in the USA 1941-1944

Seven schools were opened. These were:

- 1 BFTS at Terrell Municipal Airport, Terrell, Texas. 9 June 1941
- 2 BFTS at War Eagle Field, Lancaster, California. 9 June 1941
- 3 BFTS at Miami Municipal Airport, Miami, Oklahoma 16 June 1941
- 4 BFTS at Falcon Field, Mesa, Arizona. 16 June 1941
- 5 BFTS at Riddle Field, Clewiston, Florida. 17 July 1941
- 6 BFTS at Ponca City Regional Airport, Ponca City, Oklahoma. 23 August 1941
- 7 BFTS at Avenger Field, Sweetwater, Texas. May 1942 but closed August 1942
