= No. 10 Flying Training School RAF =

Former Royal Air Force flying training school

Coordinates: 52°52′33″N 2°32′08″W

No. 10 Flying Training School RAF
- Active: 1 Jan 1936 - 1 Nov 1940; 15 Jan 1952 - 14 Apr 1954; 1 Jun 1954 – 1 Jul 1954
- Country: United Kingdom
- Branch: Royal Air Force
- Role: Pilot training

No. 10 Flying Training School (10 FTS) is a former Royal Air Force flying training school that operated between 1936 and 1954.

== History ==
=== First formation ===
- 1 Jan 1936 - 1 Nov 1940

Formed at RAF Ternhill and redesignated as 10 Service Flying Training School on 3 September 1939 (just after the outbreak of the Second World War). It was disbanded at Ternhill and transferred to Canada to become 32 Service Flying Training School.

=== Second formation ===
- 15 Jan 1952 - 14 Apr 1954

Reformed at RAF Pershore as 10 (Advanced) Flying Training School. The school disbanded still at Pershore over two years later.

=== Third formation ===
- 1 Jun 1954 – 1 Jul 1954

Reformed at RAF Merryfield as 10 FTS by redesignating 208 Advanced Flying School but disbanded one month later to become No. 9 Flying Training School RAF.
