= No. 1 Flying Training School RAF =

Flying Training School of the Royal Air Force

Coordinates: 54°02′047.3″N 1°14′51.9″W

- School badge
- Active: 1919–1931; 1935–1942; 1947–1948; 1950–1955; 1955–2019; 2020–present
- Country: United Kingdom
- Branch: Royal Air Force
- Type: Flying training school
- Role: Basic and advanced helicopter training
- Part of: Directorate of Flying Training
- Station: RAF Shawbury
- Mottos: Terra marique ad caelum (Latin for 'By land and sea to the sky')
- Aircraft: Juno HT1; Jupiter HT1

The No. 1 Flying Training School (1 FTS) is the oldest military pilot training school in the world, currently used to deliver rotary training to aircrew of the British armed forces.

== History ==
=== First formation (1919 – 1931) ===
On 23 December 1919, 1 FTS was officially formed by renaming the Netheravon Flying School, which had been formed on 29 July 1919 at Netheravon in Wiltshire, England, out of the 2nd incarnation of No. 8 Training Squadron, which in its turn had been formed on 15 May 1919 out of No. 8 Training Depot Station, all at Netheravon. During this part of its service life, 1 FTS and its predecessors flew aircraft such as the Airco DH.9A, the Avro 504, the Bristol F.2 Fighter, and the Sopwith Snipe.

1 FTS was disbanded on 1 February 1931. Part of its mission, the training of Fleet Air Arm (FAA) officers, had already been taken over by RAF Leuchars since 15 February 1928.

=== Second formation (1935 – 1942) ===
The second incarnation of 1 FTS occurred at RAF Leuchars on 1 April 1935, tasked with training Royal Navy officers for the Fleet Air Arm. On 26 August 1938, the unit returned to its birthplace at RAF Netheravon, and on 1 September 1939 it was renamed No. 1 Service Flying Training School. It disbanded on 7 March 1942, when Netheravon was required for Army Cooperation Command use. Aircraft flown in this period included the Fairey IIIF, Hawker Hart, Westland Wapiti, Hawker Hind, Hawker Audax, de Havilland DH.82A Tiger Moth, North American Harvard, Fairey Battle and Miles Master.

=== Third formation (1947 – 1948) ===
After the Second World War, 1 FTS was briefly reconstituted by the renaming of No. 17 Service Flying Training School RAF (17 SFTS) on 18 June 1947 at RAF Spitalgate. The school had RLGs (Relief Landing Ground) at RAF Folkingham between 28 July 1947 and August 1947, and at RAF Bottesford after that; it was disbanded again on 25 February 1948. Aircraft flown in this period were the de Havilland Tiger Moth and the North American Harvard.

=== Fourth formation (1950 – 1955) ===
RAF Oakington saw the fifth incarnation of 1 FTS, when it was reformed once again on 1 December 1950 with the North American Harvard T.2B. On 31 October 1951 the school had completely moved to RAF Moreton-in-Marsh and had been given Percival Prentice T.1s, but disbanded again on 20 April 1955.

=== Fifth formation (1955 – 2019) ===
On 1 May 1955 No. 22 Flying Training School RAF (22 FTS) at RAF Syerston was renamed to 1 FTS. It flew the Percival Provost T.1, de Havilland Canada DHC-1 Chipmunk T.10 and de Havilland Vampire T.11, moving to RAF Linton-on-Ouse on 18 November 1957. Initially equipped with Vampire T.11 and Provost trainers, 1 FTS re-equipped with the Hunting Aircraft Jet Provost T.3 from 1961. The unit's tie to the Jet Provost continued with the BAC Jet Provost T.4 and the pressurised BAC Jet Provost T.5, until 1989, when synthetic training took over until the introduction of the Short Tucano T.1 from May 1992.

From 1 April 1995, 1 FTS absorbed the Central Flying School (CFS) and No. 6 Flying Training School RAF (6 FTS) Tucano elements, including No. 72 (Reserve) Squadron RAF (72 Sqn) and No. 207 (Reserve) Squadron RAF (207 Sqn).

The school marked its 90th anniversary in July 2009 with a flypast of Tucano aircraft over York Minster and other events at RAF Linton-on-Ouse.

1 FTS was stationed at RAF Linton-on-Ouse with the role of basic training of pilots and navigators for the Royal Air Force and the Royal Navy, flying 78 Tucano aircraft.

The Refresher Flying Flight was here from 24 April 1995 within Tucano Squadron, Central Flying School detachment.

=== Sixth formation (2020 – present) ===
In February 2020, the Defence Helicopter Flying School based at RAF Shawbury in Shropshire, was renamed No. 1 Flying Training School and operates 29 Airbus H135 'Juno' and 3 Airbus H145 'Jupiter'.

== Operations and training ==
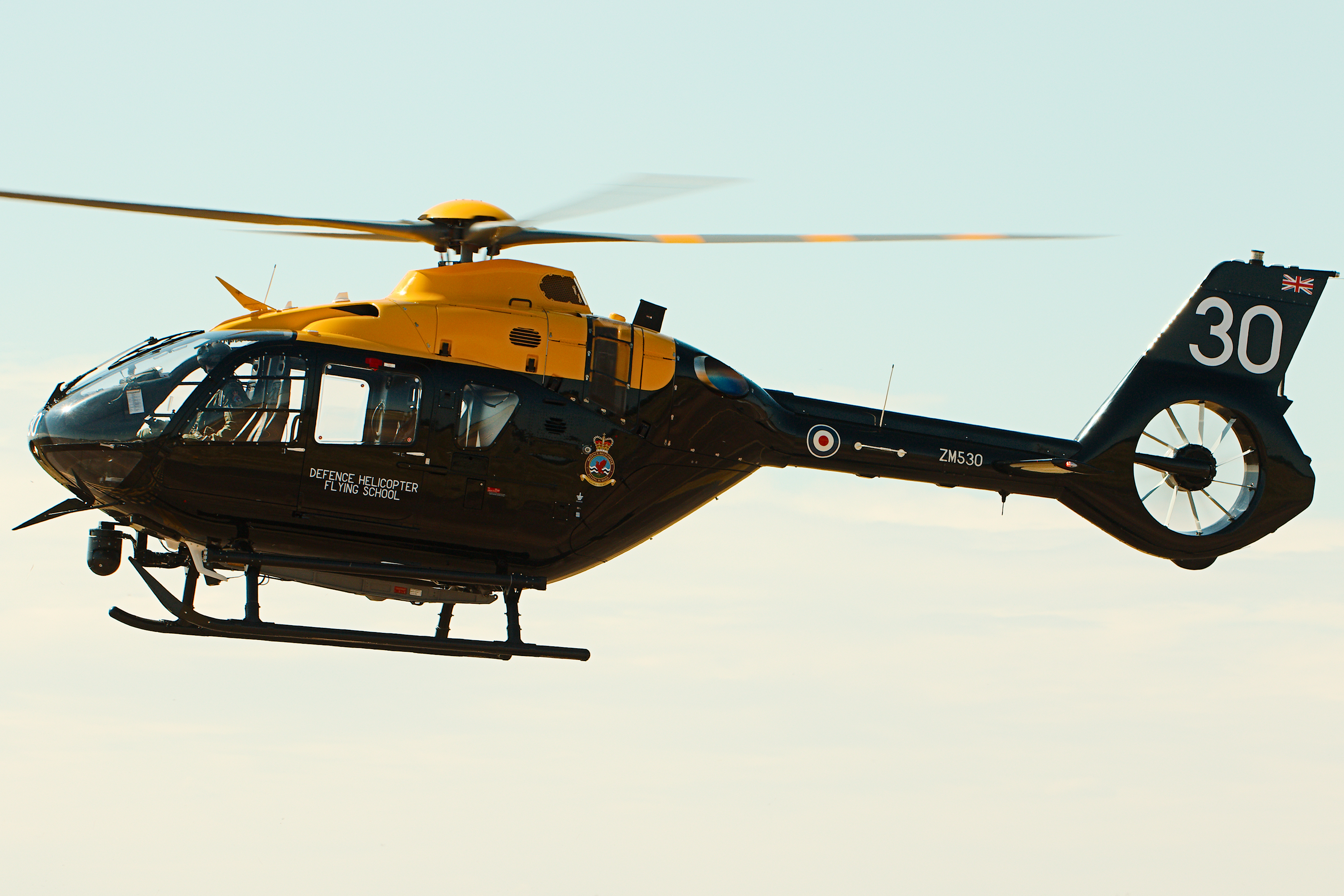
An Airbus H135 Juno of the Defence Helicopter Flying School used for Basic Rotary Training.

No.1 Flying Training School trains all military helicopter crews for the Royal Air Force, Royal Navy's Fleet Air Arm and the British Army's Army Air Corps.

Airbus provides and maintains the Juno HT1 and Jupiter HT1 helicopters and Babcock and Lockheed Martin have contracts for infrastructure and ground Based Training Equipment. 1FTS has 161 instructors, 102 of which are military and 59 which are civilian. The school is expected to train 286 students per annum.

Four classes per annum go through Shawbury on six-month courses, two with 705 NAS and two with No. 660 Squadron AAC. During the initial course students are taught basic rotary-wing skills and emergency handling, including engine-off landings, leading to a first solo flight and a handling check. Students then develop their basic skills into more applied techniques such as non-procedural instrument flying, basic night flying, low-level and formation flying, mountain flying in Snowdonia and an introduction to winching for FAA students.

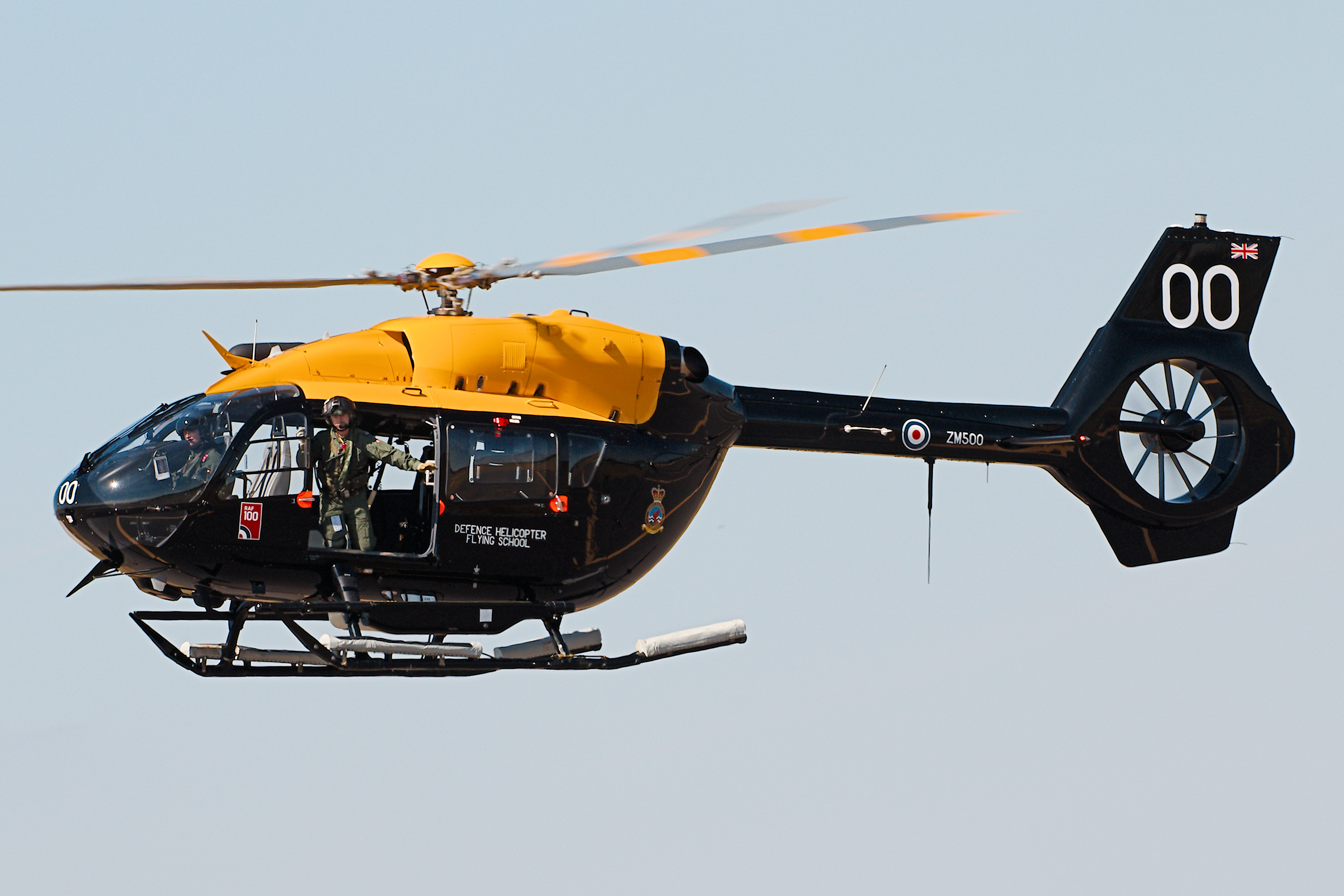
An Airbus H145 Jupiter of No. 202 Squadron RAF, Defence Helicopter Flying School.

Several other courses, sometimes bespoke, are available to British and international students.

As well as live flying, the training courses make use of synthetic training equipment, including full size replicas of the aircraft cockpit instruments, crewman cabin area and support helicopter passenger/freight loading and unloading space, within seven flying training devices (provided by CAE Inc.) and two virtual reality trainers and a mock Chinook cabin.

All aircrew instruction is carried out by Central Flying School (Helicopters) (CFS(H)) Instructors. These Instructors are a mix of military and civilian personnel.

No. 1 FTS uses grass airfields at RAF Ternhill and Chetwynd for helicopter training, both are located in Shropshire.

== Squadrons ==
Squadrons of No. 1 Flying Training School
Squadron	Service	Station	Aircraft	Role	Notes
2 Maritime Air Wing (2 MAW)
No. 660 Squadron	Army Air Corps	RAF Shawbury	Airbus Juno HT1	Basic helicopter flying training	Total : 29 in 2019
705 Naval Air Squadron	Fleet Air Arm	RAF Shawbury	Airbus Juno HT1	Basic helicopter flying training	Total : 29 in 2019
No. 202 Squadron	Royal Air Force	RAF Valley	Airbus Jupiter HT1	Maritime and mountain flying training	3 in 2019. Prepares RAF trainees as well as FAA trainees who are destined for the anti-submarine warfare Merlin or Wildcat.
9 Regiment Army Air Corps
No. 60 Squadron	Royal Air Force	RAF Shawbury	Airbus Juno HT1	Advanced helicopter flying training	Prepares RAF and some FAA trainees for their front-line aircraft types; Chinook, Puma and Commando Helicopter Force Merlin.
No. 670 Squadron	Army Air Corps	RAF Shawbury	Airbus Juno HT1	Advanced helicopter flying training	Prepares army trainees for their front-line aircraft; Apache, Wildcat or Dauphin. Previously trained personnel for the Gazelle and Bell 212

== See also ==
- List of Royal Air Force schools
