= RCAF Station Port Albert =

Second World War Royal Air Force Training Base

- Port Albert, Ontario; Near Port Albert, Ontario in Canada
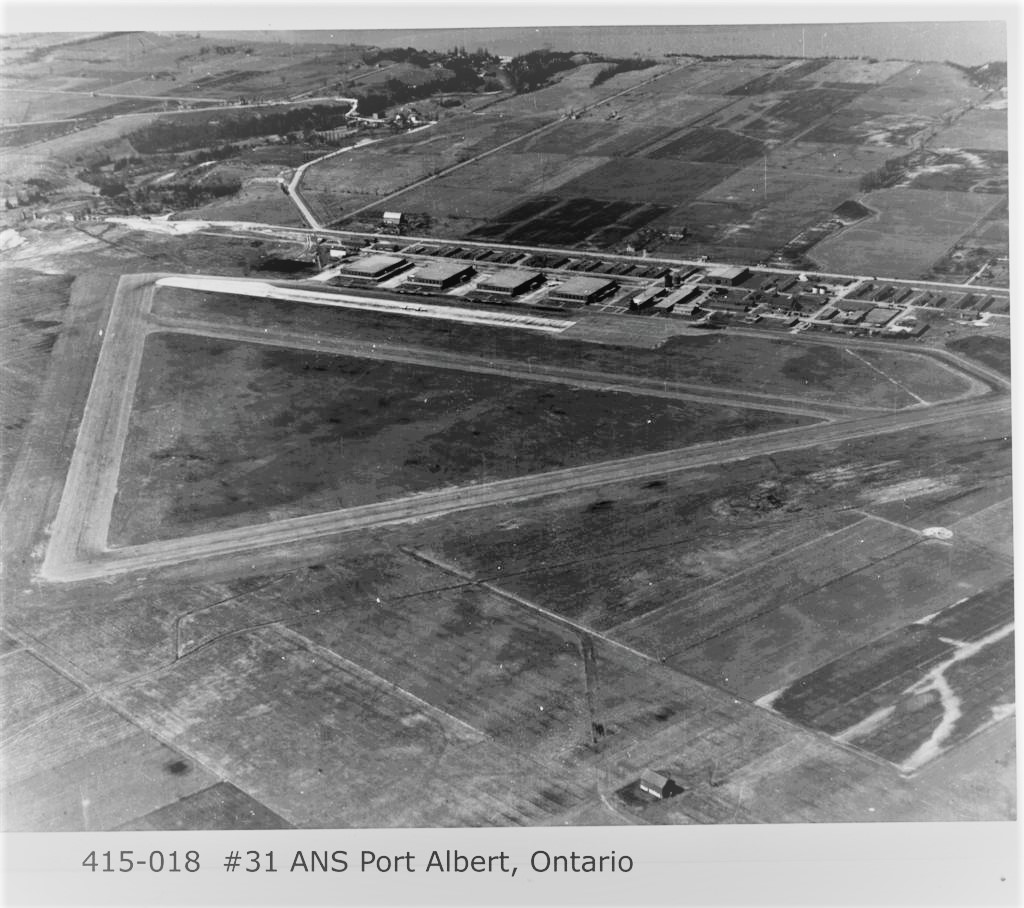
- No. 31 ANS, circa 1940s

Site information
- Owner: Royal Canadian Air Force
- Operator: Royal Air Force
- Condition: Reverted to farmland

Location
- Coordinates: 43°53′N 81°42′W

Garrison information
- Garrison: No. 31 Air Navigation School

Airfield information
- Identifiers: IATA: none, ICAO: none
- Elevation: 691 ft (211 m) AMSL
Runways
Direction	Length and surface
6/24	3,000 ft (910 m) Hard Surfaced
14/32	3,000 ft (910 m) Hard Surfaced
1/19	3,000 ft (910 m) Hard Surfaced

RCAF Station Port Albert was a Second World War, Royal Canadian Air Force station located near Port Albert, Ontario, Canada in the Ashfield–Colborne–Wawanosh township. The station was home to the Royal Air Force's No. 31 Air Navigation School.

In the summer of 1940 the United Kingdom was faced with the loss of Norway, Denmark, the Low Countries, and France, and the British Isles came under constant air attack by the German air force, in what is known as the Battle of Britain. The British decided to move some of their air training schools elsewhere, and reached an agreement with the Canadians to transfer fourteen training schools to Canada. The first was No. 7 Service Flying Training School from Peterborough, England, which was relocated to Kingston, Ontario as No. 31 Service Flying Training School, and the second was Navigation School No. 48 General Reconnaissance from St. Athan, Wales, which moved to Port Albert as No. 31 Air Navigation School in October 1940. The school opened 18 November 1940 and closed 17 February 1945. The RAF school was integrated into the British Commonwealth Air Training Plan in 1942. Like other RAF schools in Canada, it was subject to RCAF administrative and operational control.

The Canadian navigator Group Captain Kenneth C. Maclure developed his method of Grid Navigation while stationed at No. 31 Air Navigation School in 1941, and in 1945, became one of the first men to fly over the North Pole.

== Aerodrome information ==
In approximately 1942, the aerodrome was listed as RCAF Aerodrome - Port Albert, Ontario at 43°53′N 81°42′W with a variation of 6 degrees west and elevation of 691 ft (211 m). The aerodrome was listed with three runways as follows:

Runway Name	Length	Width	Surface
6/24	3,000 ft (910 m)	150 ft (46 m)	Hard Surfaced
14/32	3,000 ft (910 m)	150 ft (46 m)	Hard Surfaced
1/19	3,000 ft (910 m)	150 ft (46 m)	Hard Surfaced

== Postwar ==
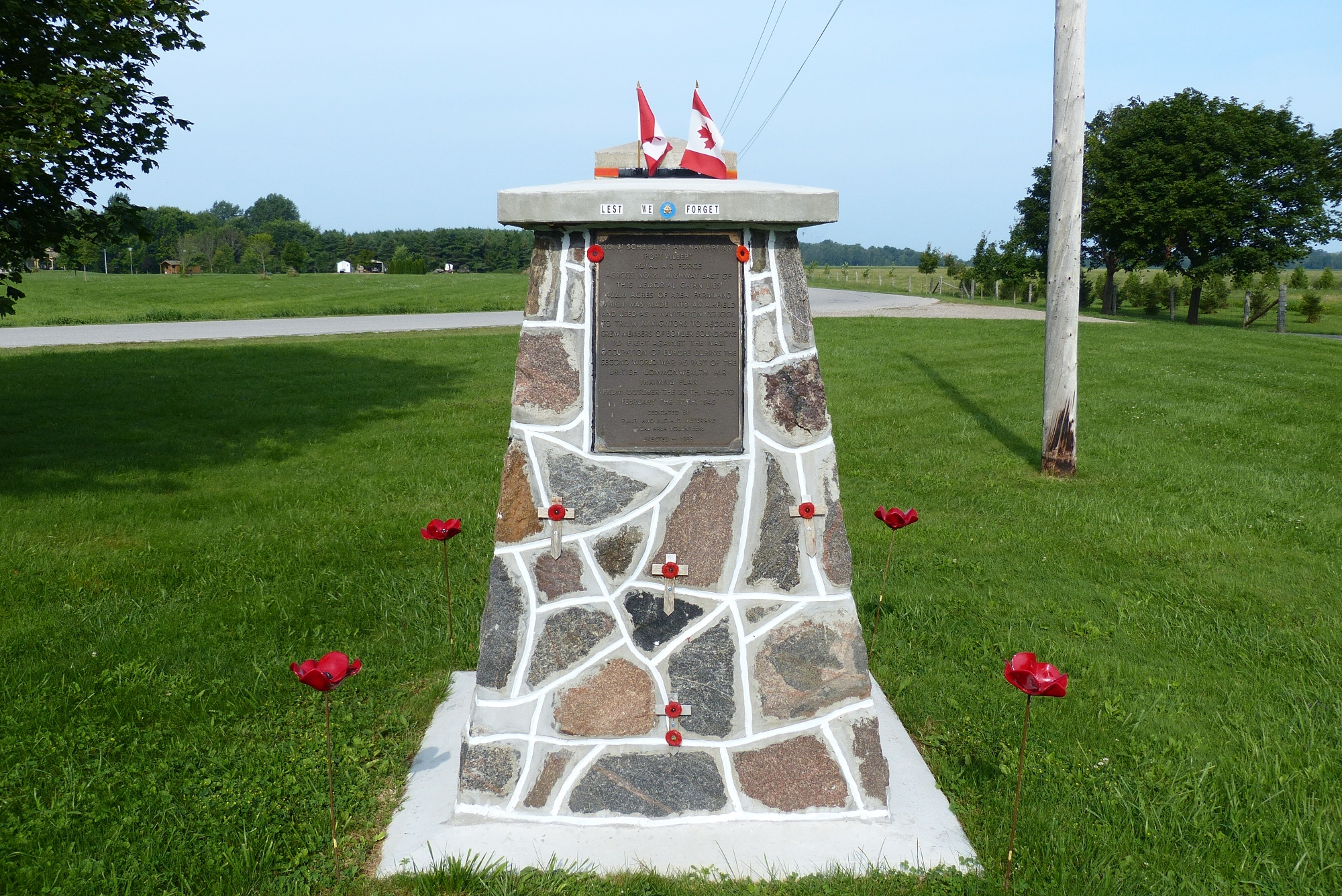
The Memorial Cairn

The site came under the control of the Canadian Government's War Assets Corporation, and by the summer of 1949 the buildings had been demolished or sold to other governments and private individuals. The Royal Canadian Branch 309 Lucknow, Ontario building and the Dungannon Agricultural Society hall are both buildings moved from No. 31 Air Navigation School.

Mr. Reg McGee purchased the property in 1950, and for a few years in the late 1950s the London Automobile Sports Club held car races on the runways. McGee's sons sold the site in 1969, and subsequently the airport site has had several more owners, who used it as farmland.

A memorial cairn was erected in 1988 on Highway 21 near the north entrance road to Port Albert.

There are still a few signs of No. 31 on the airfield site in 2017.

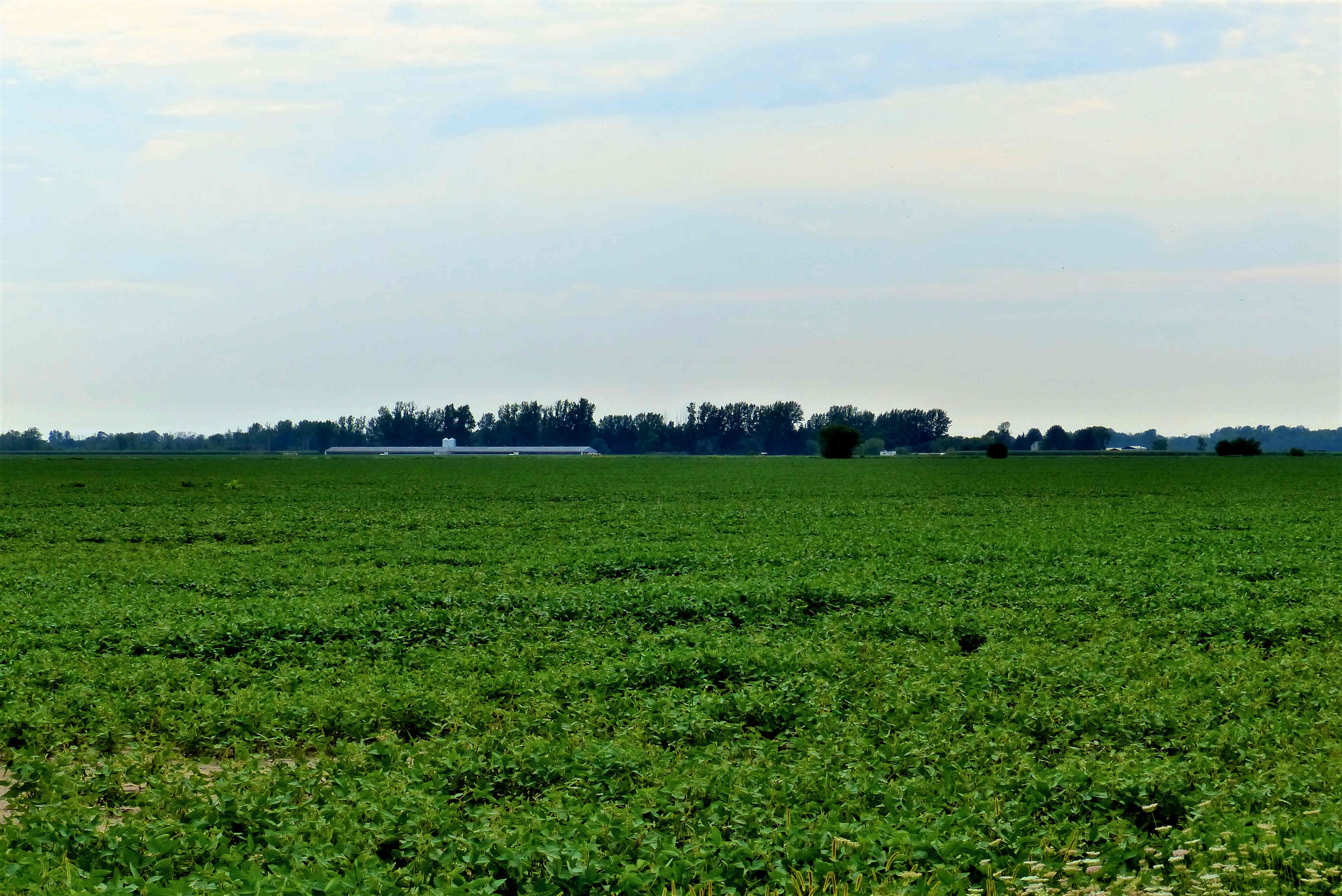
Runway area, 2017

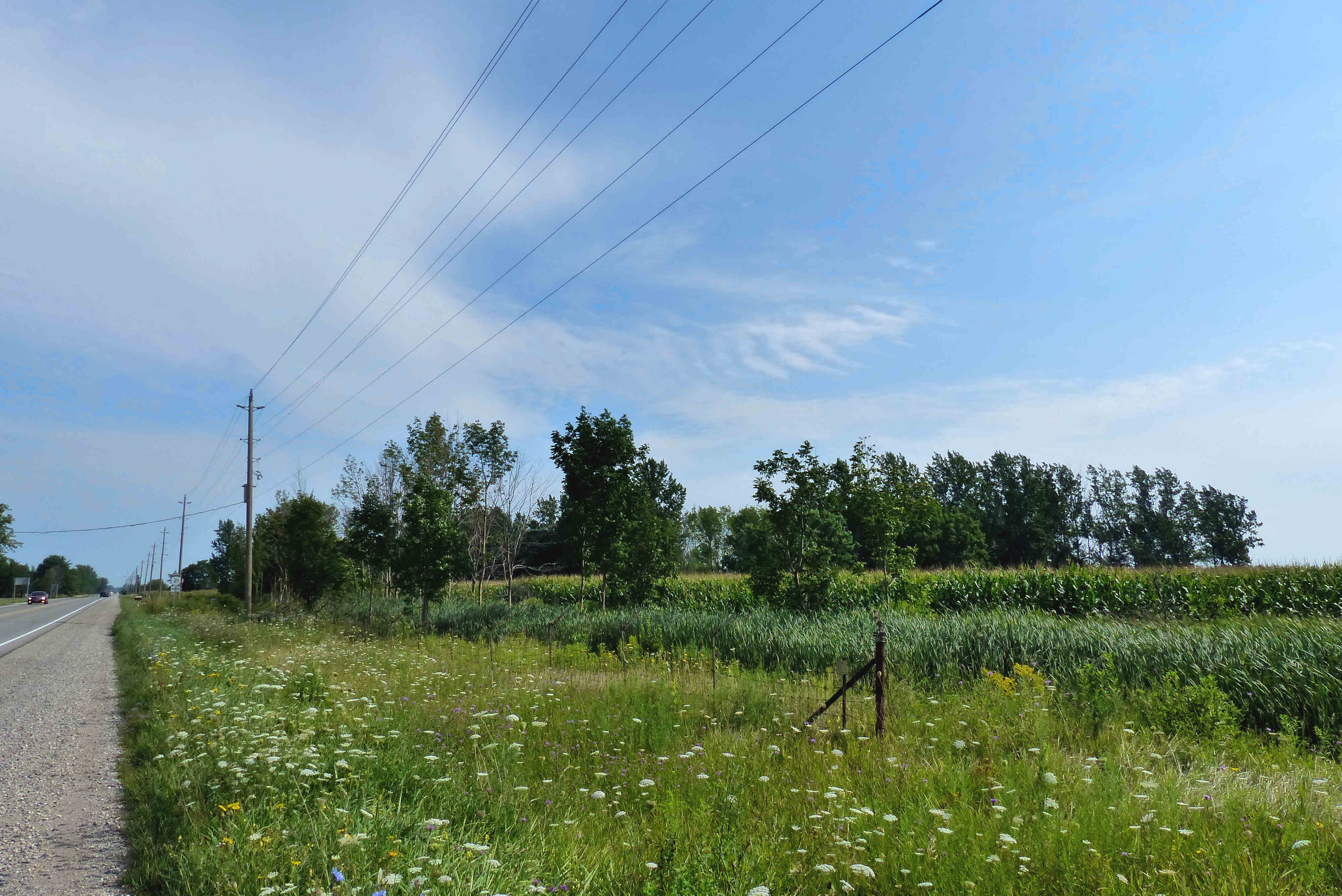
Hangar line and fence, 2017

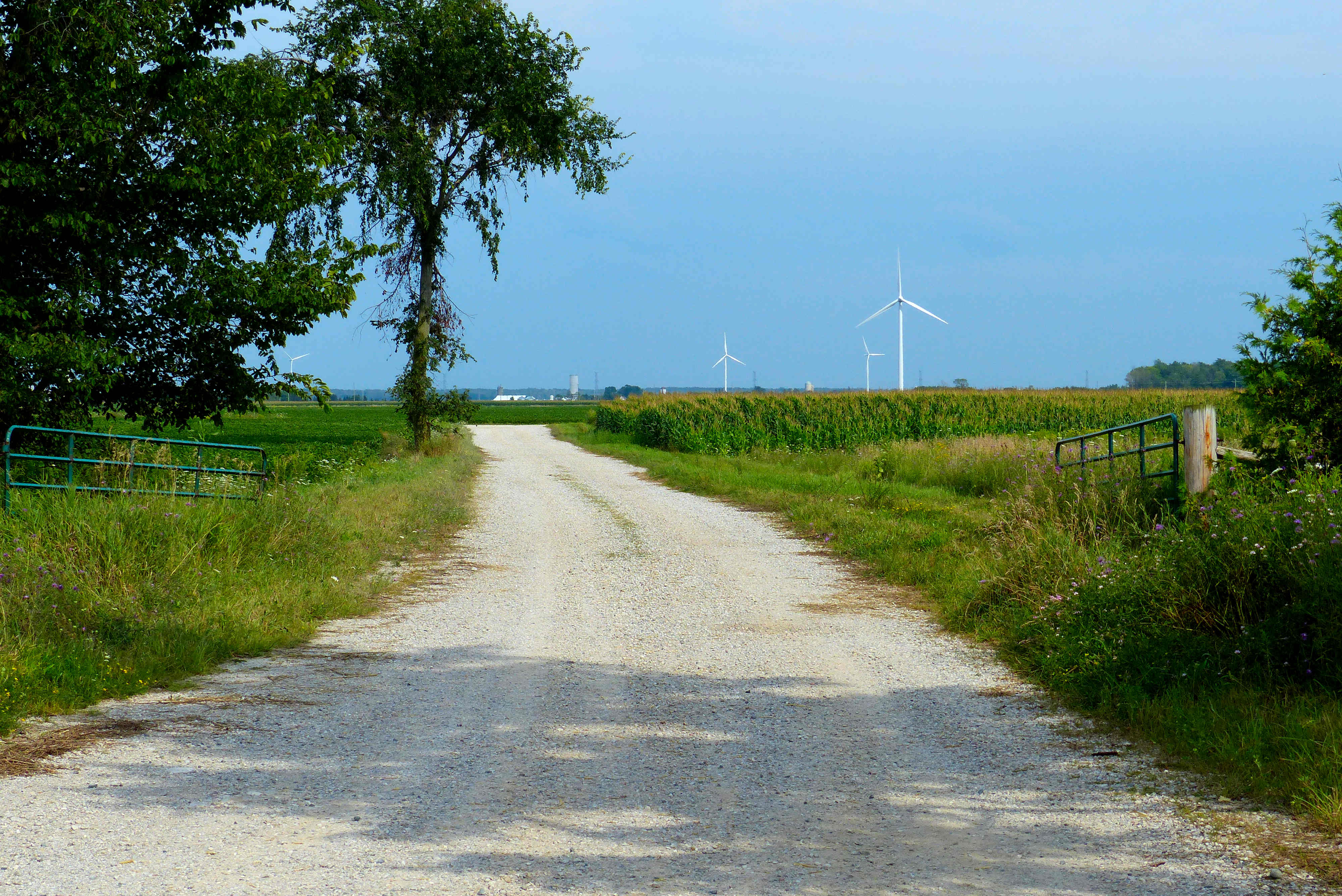
Main entrance, 2017

In 2020, the old airfield is easily identified from the air. Compare these modern aerial photos with the 1940 aerial photo.

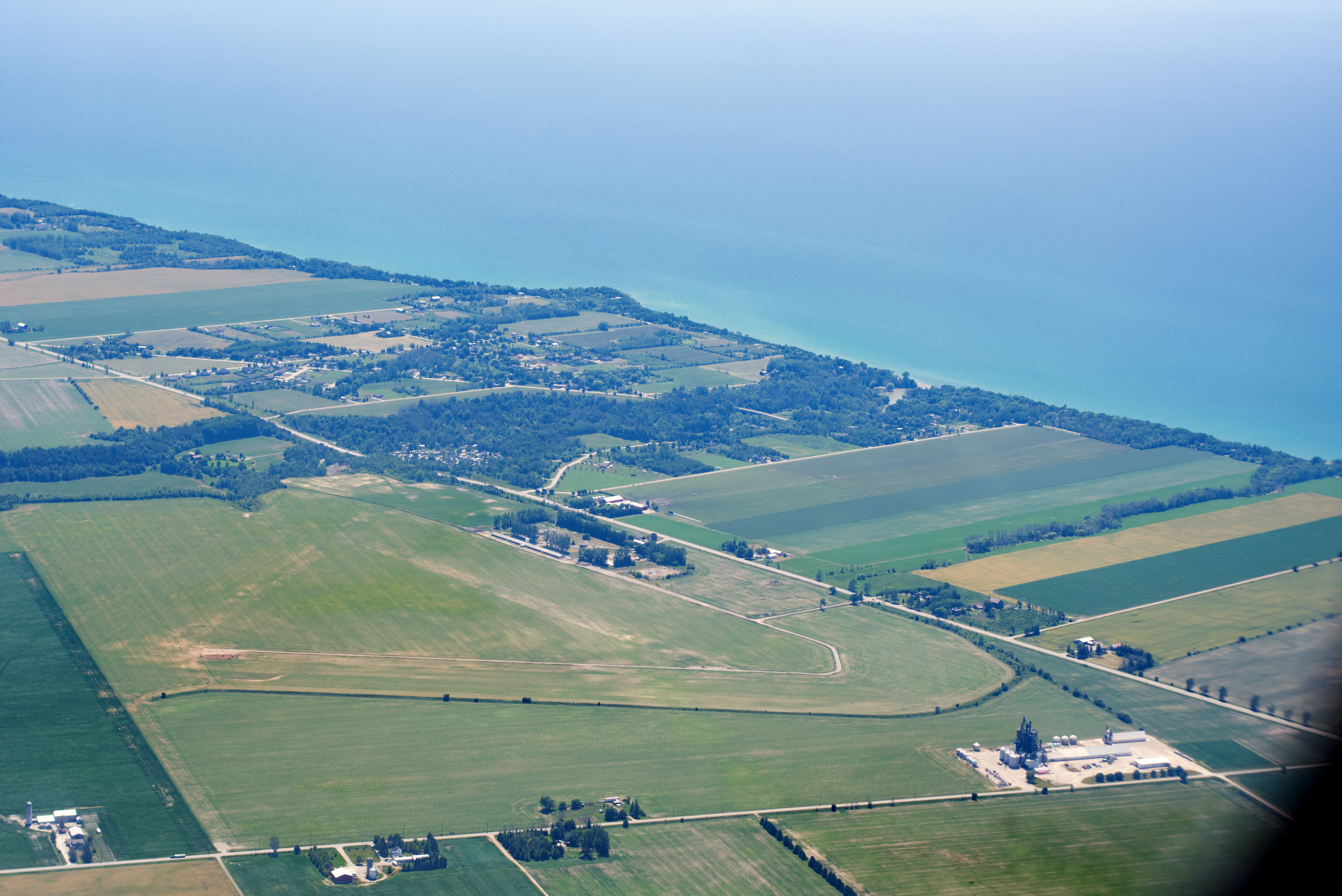
Southwest view, 2020

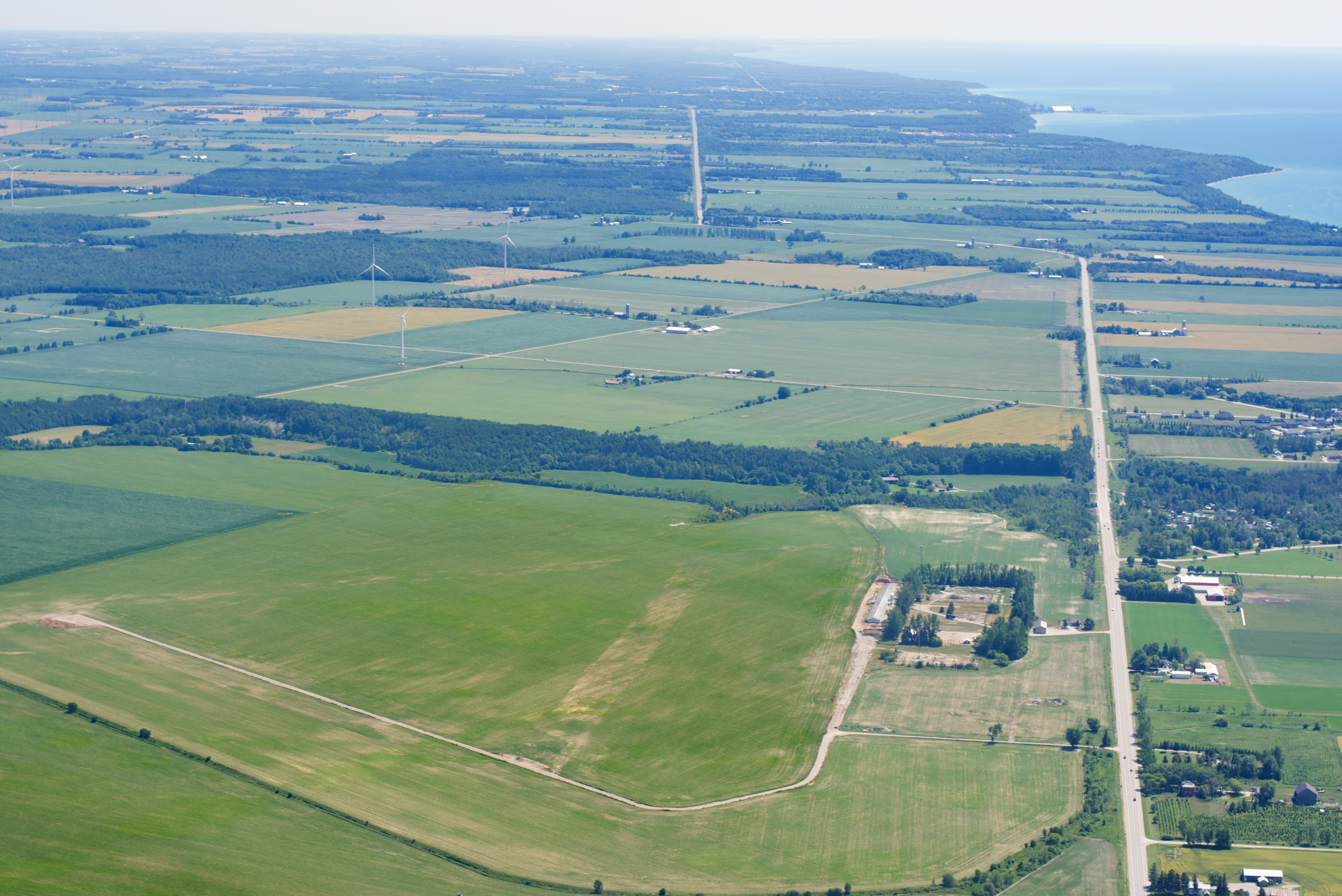
South view, 2020

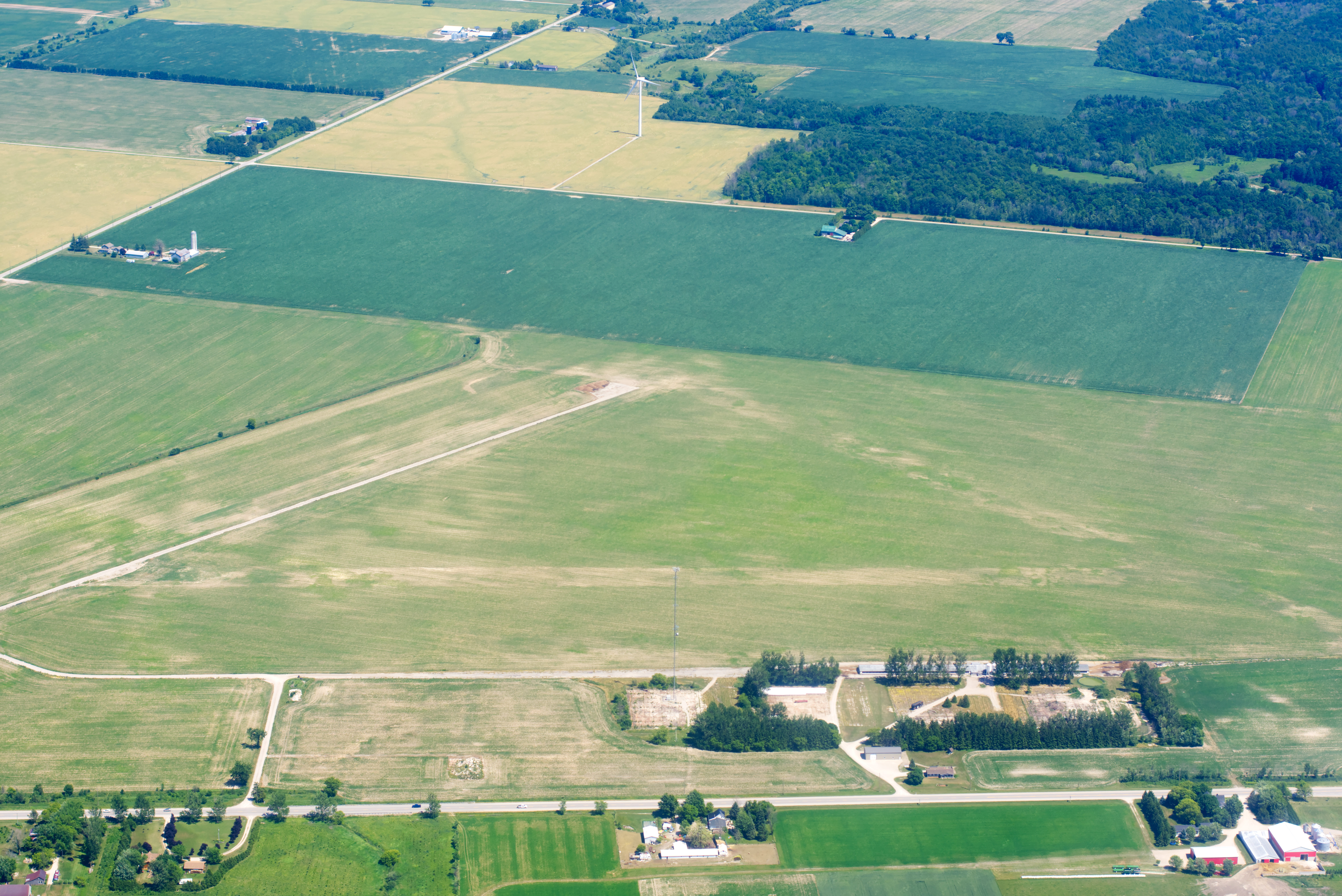
East view, 2020

The Huron County Museum & Historic Gaol in Goderich, Ontario has an extensive and accessible collection of artifacts from No. 31 Air Navigation School.

== Remembrance ==
Mr. Eugene McGee compiled a list of thirty-six airmen who died while serving at Port Albert. Three of the men were members of the Royal Canadian Air Force, one man was from the Royal New Zealand Air Force, but most of them served in the Royal Air Force or Royal Navy. Some perished in Lake Huron or Georgian Bay, and their remains have not been recovered. The names of these missing men are recorded on the Ottawa Memorial. The others are buried at various locations in Canada, including the Maitland Cemetery in Goderich, Ontario. McGee's list is publicly displayed at the Huron County Museum & Historic Gaol.

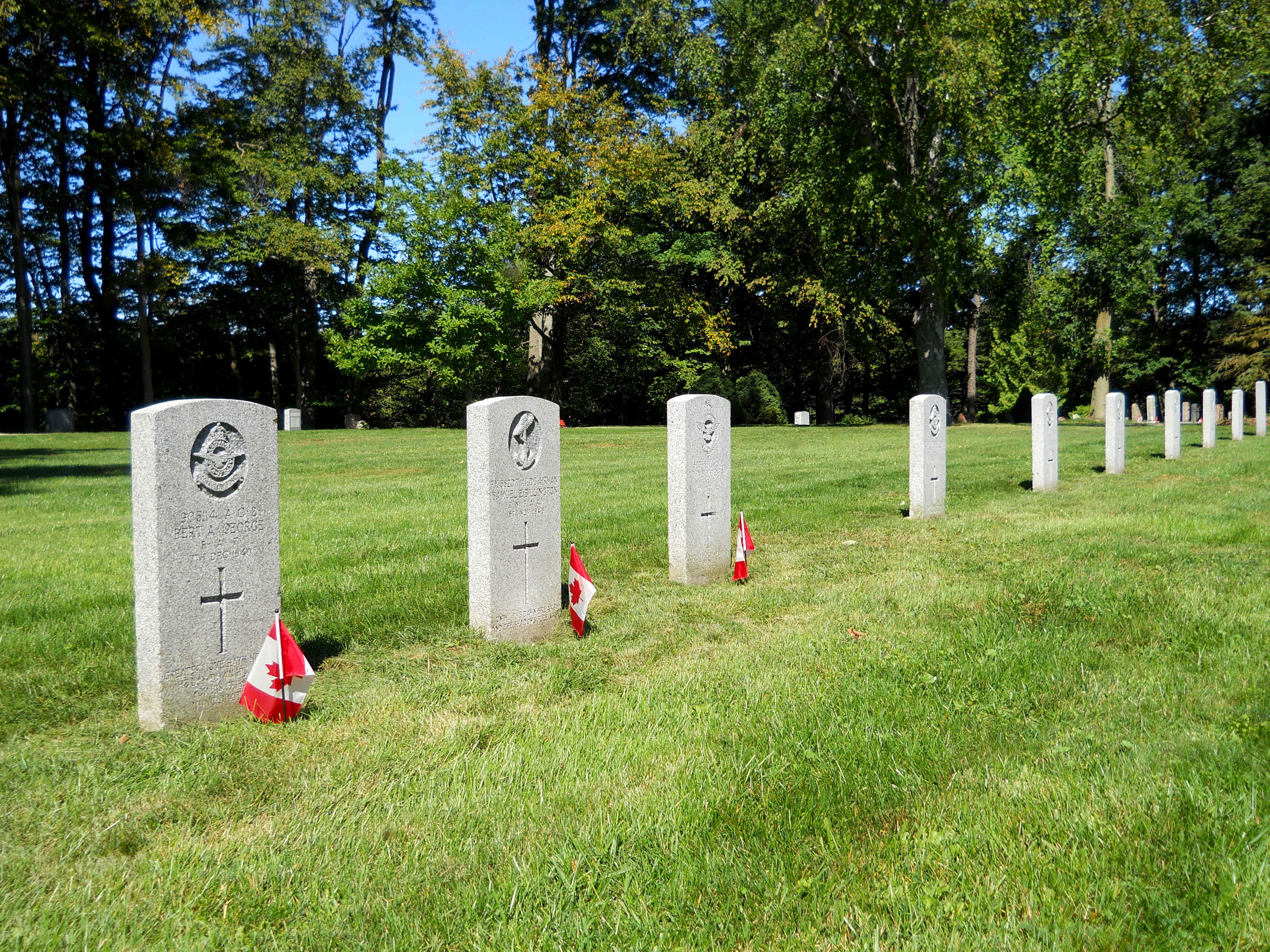
The airmens' graves at Maitland Cemetery
