= No. 12 Flying Training School RAF =

Former Royal Air Force flying training school

No. 12 Flying Training School
- Active: 1 December 1938 - 1 April 1942; 1 June 1954 – 24 June 1955
- Country: United Kingdom
- Branch: Royal Air Force
- Role: Military Pilot training
- Garrison/HQ: RAF Grantham (Jan-Oct 1939)

No. 12 Flying Training School (12 FTS) is a former Royal Air Force flying training school that operated between 1938 and 1955.
