= No. 5 Flying Training School RAF =

Former Royal Air Force flying training school

No. 5 Flying Training School
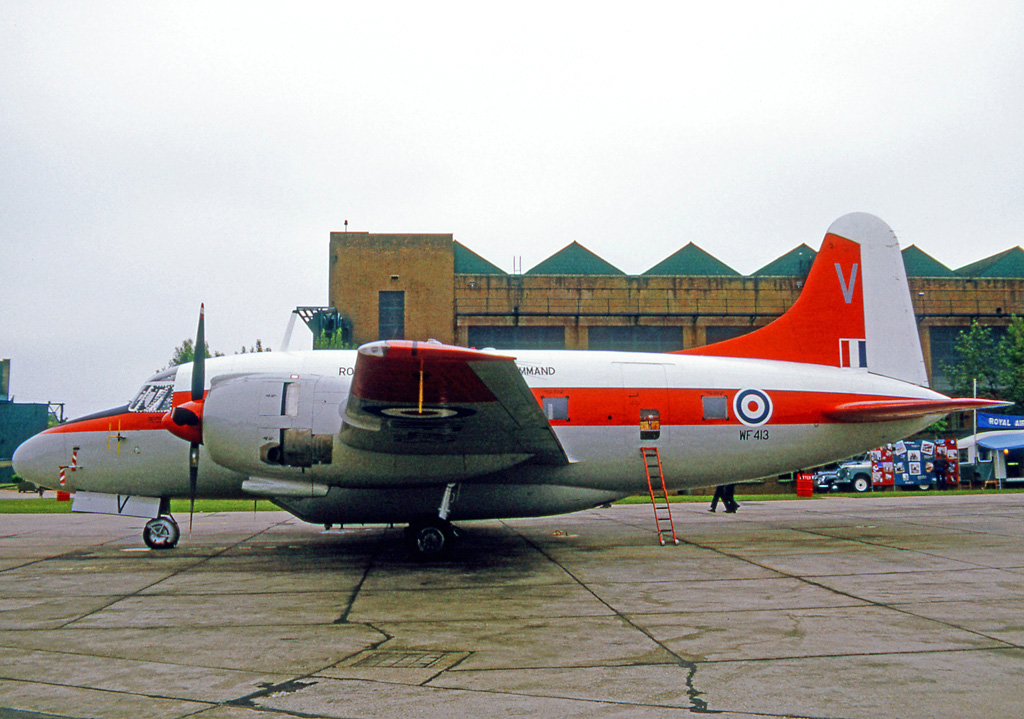
- Vickers Varsity T.1 WF413 of No. 5 Flying Training School Royal Air Force in 1971
- Active: 26 Apr 1920 – 11 Apr 1942; 23 Apr 1947 – 4 Jan 1948; 22 Jan 1951 – 30 Dec 1953; 1 Jun 1954 – 31 Dec 1974
- Country: United Kingdom
- Branch: Royal Air Force
- Role: Pilot training

No. 5 Flying Training School (5 FTS) is a former Royal Air Force flying training school that operated between 1920 and 1974.

== History ==
=== First formation ===
The school was formed on 26 April 1920 at RAF Shotwick and redesignated No. 5 Service Flying Training School from 3 September 1939, part of No. 23 Group. It used a variety of aircraft including de Havilland DH.9s, Avro 504s, Sopwith Snipes, Westland Wapitis, Avro Tutors, Gloster Gauntlets, Westland Wallaces, Hawker Audaxs, Hawker Hinds, Fairey Battles, Hawker Hurricanes, North American Harvards, Miles Masters, Airspeed Oxfords, Miles Magisters and de Havilland Tiger Moths.

It was disbanded in April 1942 at RAF Ternhill by redesignation to No. 5 (Pilots) Advanced Flying Unit.

=== Second formation ===
The school was reformed from 23 April 1947 at RAF Thornhill, Southern Rhodesia as part of the Rhodesian Air Training Group until 4 January 1948 when it was redesignated No. 3 Air Navigation School (3 ANS), specialising in training Navigators on Avro Ansons. Their other aircraft (Tiger Moths and Harvards) were sent to nearby No. 4 Flying Training School RAF at RAF Heany.

=== Third formation ===
Reformed as a standard flying training school, again in Southern Rhodesia, flying Tiger Moths and de Havilland Chipmunks on 22 January 1951. It would reabsorb 3 ANS on 28 September 1951 and stay at RAF Thornhill until disbanding on 30 December 1953.

=== Fourth formation ===
1954–1974 No. 5 Flying Training School, (5 FTS), reformed at RAF Oakington on 1 June 1954 from No. 206 Advanced Flying School RAF. Its initial role was to convert trainee pilots to jets using de Havilland Vampire T.5 single seat jets and Vampire T.11 twin-seat jets. In March 1962 these types were exchanged for the Vickers Varsity T.1 twin piston-engine navigational trainers. The school took new graduates who had completed basic pilot training and provided further training in the handling of multi-engine aircraft as a precursor to posting onto Bomber or Transport squadrons/units. The Varsity remained in service with 5 FTS until early in 1974 when it was replaced in the role by the Scottish Aviation Jetstream T.1. 5 FTS was disbanded on 31 December 1974 when the need for training on piston engined aircraft reduced. The airfield was then closed, becoming a British Army barracks.
