= No. 215 Advanced Flying School RAF =

Former Royal Air Force flying training school

Coordinates: 53°28′47″N 1°00′39″W

- Active: As 215 AFS: 1952 - 1954; Previous designations: 1935-1952
- Disbanded: 1954
- Country: United Kingdom
- Allegiance: Royal Air Force
- Role: Flying training
- Last Garrison: RAF Finningley

No. 215 Advanced Flying School RAF was a flying school of the Royal Air Force which was disbanded in 1954 at RAF Finningley.

== Previous identities ==
- No. 11 Flying Training School RAF (1935-39)
- No. 11 Service Flying Training School RAF (1939-42)
- No. 11 (Pilots) Advanced Flying Unit RAF (1942-45) (Disbanded)
- No. 21 (Pilots) Advanced Flying Unit RAF (1943-47) (Formed from a nucleus from 11 (P)AFU) - merged with No. 1 Refresher School RAF (1946-47)
- No. 1 (Pilot) Refresher Flying Unit RAF (1947-49) absorbed No. 2 (Pilot) Refresher Flying Unit RAF on 1 April 1948.
- Flying Refresher School RAF (1949-51)
- No. 101 Flying Refresher School RAF (1951-52)
- No. 215 Advanced Flying School RAF (1952-54)

No. 1 Refresher School RAF formed from Refresher Flight of No. 17 SFTS.

== 11 FTS ==
- No. 17 Operational Training Unit RAF (1940-47)
- No. 201 Advanced Flying School RAF (1947-54)
- No. 11 Flying Training School RAF (1954-7/6/55)
- Into No. 2 Air Navigation School (1947-70)
- No. 6 Flying Training School RAF (1970-96)
