= No. 9 Flying Training School RAF =

Former Royal Air Force flying training school

No. 9 Flying Training School
- Active: 2 Mar 1936 - 14 Feb 1942; 1 Dec 1951 - 1 May 1954; 1 Jul 1954 – 16 Feb 1955
- Country: United Kingdom
- Branch: Royal Air Force
- Role: Pilot training

No. 9 Flying Training School (9 FTS) is a former Royal Air Force flying training school that operated between 1936 and 1955.
