= No. 21 Group RAF =

Former Royal Air Force operations group

No. 21 (Training) Group RAF ~~No. 21 Group RAF~~
- Royal Air Force Ensign
- Active: 1 April – 1 July 1918; 12 April 1926 – 1 February 1934; 1 December 1938 – 1 March 1955
- Disbanded: 1 March 1955
- Country: United Kingdom
- Branch: Royal Air Force
- Type: Royal Air Force group
- Role: Military aviation training
- Part of: RAF Training Command (December 1938 – May 1940); RAF Flying Training Command (May 1940 – March 1955)
- Motto(s): Latin: Ad Suam Quisque Operam ("To each his own work")

Commanders
- Notable commanders: Air Vice Marshal Hugh Champion de Crespigny CB, MC, DFC

No. 21 Group RAF (21 Gp) is a former Royal Air Force group that existed from April–July 1918; 1926–1934, a redesignation of No. 1 Group RAF; after which it was merged into Inland Area; and from 1938 to 1955.

== History ==
First World War

No. 21 Group formed on 1 April 1918 at RAF Montrose within No 5 Area; the following month, on 8 May, it transferred into the North-Western Area. Shortly after, on 1 July, the group disbanded into No. 20 Group RAF.

=== Interwar period ===
On 12 April 1926, it reformed as No. 21 (Training) Group, within Inland Area. The group HQ was at RAF West Drayton and it had the Aeroplane and Armament Experimental Establishment and Nos 15 and 22 Squadrons at RAF Martlesham Heath under its command. The group also had control over RAF stores, repair depots, and schools. It disbanded on 1 February 1934 and reformed at RAF Cranwell, within RAF Training Command, again as No. 21 (Training) Group, on 1 December 1938.

=== Second World War ===
The group was transferred to RAF Flying Training Command on 27 May 1940, responsible for the RAF College and the Service Flying Training Schools from the Midlands northwards. The group HQ relocated to RAF Spitalgate on 28 July 1944.

=== Cold War ===
The group's headquarters moved to the former No. 5 Group's HQ, St Vincents Hall, in Grantham, on 7 March 1946 and the following year, on 1 May 1947, the Group absorbed No. 91 Group RAF, from RAF Bomber Command, taking over HQ for No. 91 Group, Morton Hall, Swinderby in Lincolnshire. On 24 June 1953 the Group absorbed No. 54 Group RAF, which had been reformed 22 months earlier within RAF Flying Training Command to control the Initial Training Wings and Grading Schools. No. 21 Group disbanded on 1 March 1955.

== Structure ==
The orders of battle for No. 21 (Training) Group changed several times

=== November 1939 ===
HQ at RAF Cranwell

- RAF Cranwell
  - RAF College
- RAF Montrose
  - No. 8 Flying Training School RAF
- RAF Grantham
  - No. 12 Flying Training School RAF
- RAF Kinloss
  - No. 14 Flying Training School RAF
- RAF Lossiemouth
  - No. 15 Flying Training School RAF
- RAF Yatesbury
  - Radio Direction School

=== May 1941 ===
HQ at RAF Cranwell

- RAF Cranage
  - No. 2 School of Air Navigation RAF
- RAF Cranwell
  - RAF College Flying Training School
  - No. 2 Central Flying School RAF
- RAF Grantham
  - No. 12 Service Flying Training School RAF
- RAF Hucknall
  - No. 1 (Polish) Service Flying Training School RAF
- RAF Montrose
  - No. 8 Service Flying Training School RAF
- RAF Shawbury
  - No. 11 Service Flying Training School RAF
- RAF Ternhill
  - No. 5 Service Flying Training School RAF

=== April 1942 ===
HQ at RAF Cranwell

- RAF Cranage
  - No. 2 School of Air Navigation RAF
- RAF Cranwell
  - RAF College Flying Training School
- RAF Grantham
  - No. 12 (Pilots) Advanced Flying Unit RAF
- RAF Hucknall
  - No. 25 Elementary Flying Training School RAF
- RAF Leconfield
  - No. 15 (Pilots) Advanced Flying Unit RAF
- RAF Montrose
  - No. 8 Service Flying Training School RAF
  - No. 2 Flying Instructors School RAF
- RAF Newton
  - No. 16 Service Flying Training School RAF
- RAF Ossington
  - No. 14 (Pilots) Advanced Flying Unit RAF
- RAF Shawbury
  - No. 11 (Pilots) Advanced Flying Unit RAF
- RAF Ternhill
  - No. 5 Service Flying Training School RAF
- RAF Watton
  - No. 17 (Pilots) Advanced Flying Unit RAF

=== April 1943 ===
HQ at RAF Cranwell

- RAF Andover
  - No. 15 (Pilots) Advanced Flying Unit RAF
- RAF Cranwell
  - RAF College Flying Training School
- RAF Dalcross
  - No. 19 (Pilots) Advanced Flying Unit RAF
- RAF Grantham
  - No. 12 (Pilots) Advanced Flying Unit RAF
- RAF Hucknall
  - No. 25 (Pilots) Advanced Flying Unit RAF
- RAF Montrose
  - No. 2 Flying Instructors School RAF
- RAF Newton
  - No. 1524 (Beam Approach Training) Flight RAF
- RAF Ossington
  - No. 14 (Pilots) Advanced Flying Unit RAF
- RAF Peterborough
  - No. 7 (Pilots) Advanced Flying Unit RAF
- RAF Shawbury
  - No. 11 (Pilots) Advanced Flying Unit RAF
- RAF Sherburn-in-Elmet
  - Airborne Forces Experimental Establishment
- RAF Ternhill
  - No. 5 (Pilots) Advanced Flying Unit RAF
- RAF Watton
  - No. 17 (Pilots) Advanced Flying Unit RAF

=== July 1944 ===
HQ at RAF Cranwell

- RAF Banff
  - No. 14 (Pilots) Advanced Flying Unit RAF
  - No. 1511 (Beam Approach Training) Flight RAF
  - No. 1542 (Beam Approach Training) Flight RAF
- RAF Calveley
  - No. 11 (Pilots) Advanced Flying Unit RAF
- RAF Cranwell
  - No. 17 Service Flying Training School RAF
- RAF Errol
  - No. 9 (Pilots) Advanced Flying Unit RAF
- RAF Hucknall
  - No. 25 Elementary Flying Training School RAF
- RAF Montrose
  - No. 2 Flying Instructors School RAF
  - No. 1518 (Beam Approach Training) Flight RAF
  - No. 1541 (Beam Approach Training) Flight RAF
- RAF Newton
  - No. 16 Service Flying Training School RAF
  - No. 1524 (Beam Approach Training) Flight RAF
- RAF Shawbury
  - Central Navigation School RAF
  - No. 1534 (Beam Approach Training) Flight RAF
- RAF Sherburn-in-Elmet
  - Airborne Forces Experimental Establishment
- RAF Spitalgate
  - No. 12 (Pilots) Advanced Flying Unit RAF
  - No. 1544 (Beam Approach Training) Flight RAF
  - No. 1536 (Beam Approach Training) Flight RAF
- RAF Ternhill
  - No. 5 (Pilots) Advanced Flying Unit RAF
- RAF Wheaton Aston
  - No. 21 (Pilots) Advanced Flying Unit RAF
- RAF Bridleway Gate
  - No. 1511 (Beam Approach Training) Flight RAF

=== July 1945 ===
HQ at RAF Spitalgate

- RAF Cranwell
  - No. 19 Flying Training School RAF
- RAF Hucknall
  - No. 25 Elementary Flying Training School RAF
- RAF Montrose
  - No. 1541 (Beam Approach Training) Flight RAF
- RAF Newton
  - No. 16 Service Flying Training School RAF
- RAF Peterborough
  - No. 7 Service Flying Training School RAF
- RAF Spitalgate
  - No. 17 Service Flying Training School RAF
- RAF Ternhill
  - No. 5 (Pilots) Advanced Flying Unit RAF
- RAF Wheaton Aston
  - No. 21 (Pilots) Advanced Flying Unit RAF

=== April 1953 ===
HQ at Morton Hall, Swinderby

- RAF Bishops Court
  - No. 3 Air Navigation School RAF
- RAF Hullavington
  - No. 1 Air Navigation School RAF
- RAF Shawbury
  - Central Navigation and Control School RAF
- RAF Swinderby
  - No. 201 Advanced Flying School RAF
- RAF Thorney Island
  - No. 2 Air Navigation School RAF
- RAF Lichfield
  - No. 6 Air Navigation School RAF

== Headquarters ==
No. 21 Group had various headquarters across its three active periods

- RAF Montrose - during 1918
- RAF West Drayton - reformed from April 1926 until 1934
- RAF Cranwell - reformed from December 1938
- RAF Spitalgate - from July 1944
- St Vincents Hall, Grantham - from March 1946
- Morton Hall, Swinderby - from May 1947

== Air Officer Commanding ==
Note: The ranks shown are the ranks held at the time of holding the appointment of Air Officer Commanding, No. 21 Group Royal Air Force.

No. 21 Group commanding officers
| Rank | name | from |
|---|---|---|
| | Unknown | April 1918 |
| Disbanded | | July 1918 |
| Group Captain | Andrew George Board | August 1926 |
| | Unknown | 1927 |
| Group Captain | A B Burdett | February 1928 |
| Group Captain | Lionel Rees VC | December 1929 |
| Group Captain | Charles Edmonds | August 1931 |
| Group Captain | G P Grenfell | January 1932 |
| Disbanded | | February 1934 |
| Air Vice-Marshal | Jack Baldwin | December 1938 |
| Air Vice-Marshal | Bertine Sutton | July 1939 |
| Air Commodore | Hugh Champion de Crespigny | August 1939 |
| Air Vice-Marshal | Robert Willock | June 1940 |
| Air Vice-Marshal | Hugh Champion de Crespigny | October 1943 |
| Air Commodore | John Gosset Hawtrey | July 1945 |
| Air Commodore | Gordon Herbert Vasse | 1946 - 47 |
| Air Vice-Marshal | Francis Mellersh | 1947 - 48 |
| Air Vice-Marshal | Cecil Bouchier | 1948 - 49 |
| Air Vice-Marshal | G G Banting | March 1949 |
| Air Vice-Marshal | John Denis Breakey | March 1951 |
| Air Vice-Marshal | Andrew McKee | July 1951 |
| Air Vice-Marshal | Gilbert Nicholetts | November 1953 |

== See also ==
- List of Royal Air Force groups
