= RAF Wheaton Aston =

Former Royal Air Force station in Staffordshire, England

RAF Wheaton Aston
- RAF Little Onn
- Little Onn, Staffordshire
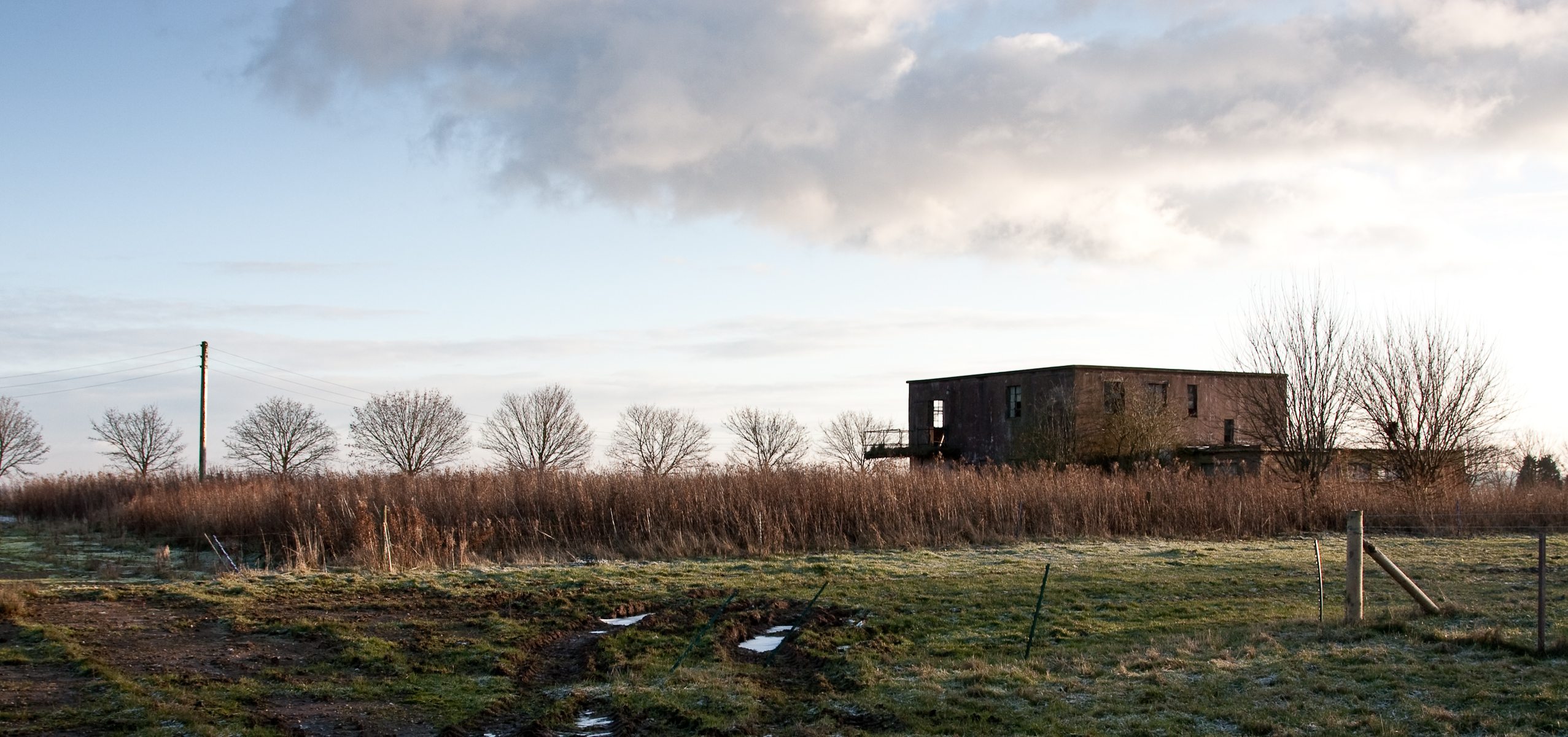
- Control tower at RAF Wheaton Aston in 2010

Site information
- Type: Bomber training base
- Code: WH
- Owner: Air Ministry; Ministry of Defence
- Controlled by: Royal Air Force
- Open to the public: Now private agricultural land
- Condition: Derelict

Location
- Coordinates: 52°43′56″N 02°14′05″W
- Height: 350 feet (110 m)

Site history
- Built: 1940–1941
- In use: 1941–1947
- Demolished: Partially

Royal Air Force Wheaton Aston, or more simply RAF Wheaton Aston, was a Royal Air Force station located just outside of the village of Wheaton Aston in Staffordshire, England. The base was actually in the hamlet of Little Onn which is 1.2 miles (2 km) north west of Wheaton Aston. The base was known locally as Little Onn or RAF Little Onn, but the policy of naming Royal Air Force stations was down to which parish the Station Headquarters was in.

The airfield was one of the Royal Air Force's largest training environments in the Second World War with an average of 11,000+ flying hours per month by 1944.

== History ==
Originally constructed from October 1940 onwards as a relief landing ground for RAF Hixon, the base at Wheaton Aston was completed six months before Hixon was. Instead Wheaton Aston became a satellite airfield of RAF High Ercall under the auspices of the Service Flying Training School (SFTS) at RAF Shawbury and a training base for No. 11 (Pilots) Advanced Flying Unit ((P)AFU). Because of the upturn in training at the base, it eventually went on to have 5 Relief Landing Grounds/Satellite sites of its own (RAF Bratton, RAF Peplow, RAF Perton, RAF Seighford & RAF Tatenhill). Throughout its existence, RAF Wheaton Aston was parented by RAF Shawbury and was dedicated to (P)AFU and Beam Approach Training (BAT). BAT was an early form of instrument landing system using radio beams. Training units based here were No. 11 (P)AFU, No 11 SFTS, No.21 (P)AFU, No. 1511 BAT Flight, No. 1517 BAT Flight and No. 1545 BAT Flight. No. 11 (P)AFU was structured into six flights, three were based at RAF Shawbury with one each at RAF Condover, RAF Perton and Wheaton Aston.

Pilots on the Empire Training Scheme at Wheaton Aston received refresher and night training on Airspeed Oxford aircraft before being posted out to an Operational Training Unit with the training extended to foreign as well as domestic aircrews. All the main units that trained at Wheaton Aston used the Airspeed Oxford Aircraft. Throughout the Second World War, Wheaton Aston remained busy and was second only to RAF Lichfield in terms of aircraft movements in Staffordshire. The airfield recorded a flying time of 8,773 hours during daylight and 2,605 at night over the course May in 1944. This was the equivalent of 15 aircraft permanently in the air for 30 days.

Training units in the Second World War, particularly those which were satellite or relief land grounds, attracted the need to be doubly insured because of the inherent nature of the training. RAF Wheaton Aston was one of two bases which were insured three times over (the other being RAF Little Rissington) because of the high casualty rate and inexperience of aircrews.

The Shropshire Union Canal is just to the east of the site and it is believed that the canal fooled some of the new pilots during night-time training. At least one aircraft, an American P-47 Thunderbolt ended up in the canal, though this was down to an engine failure with the aircraft undershooting the airfield and plunging into the canal. Whilst the pilot avoided serious injury, the aircraft was dragged out of the canal and scrapped.

The Luftwaffe dropped a 500lb bomb on the base but according to the locals, due to it being a (P)AFU, the number of crashes in the fields around the station by aircrew under training were just as memorable as the aerial bombardments.

With peace in Europe declared, Canadian personnel working at Wheaton Aston were repatriated from the base in June 1945. The same month saw some RAF and WAAF personnel released from service duties to go back to civilian life. The downturn in training did not seem to affect Wheaton Aston at this time as the monthly tally on flying hours reached 9,600, which was only marginally less than the average of flying hours recorded during the training's peak.

In October 1946, Aneurin Bevan, who was Minister for Health at the time, flew into the base from Croydon to attend a conference in Stoke-on-Trent.

Although training continued, with the end of the Second World War, the base at Wheaton Aston was surplus to requirements and the last unit to operate there, No. 21 (P)AFU was moved to Moreton-in-Marsh in December 1946. The base was abandoned completely by the Royal Air Force in 1947.

== Post RAF ==
From 1947 to 1965, the former airbase buildings were used to house Polish immigrants, many of whom had been displaced by the Second World War. Some were in transit before going on to America and Canada whilst some stayed behind and upon closure of the camp, were housed locally at Gnosall and in Stafford. One of those who arrived at the former RAF Base and stayed on in Stafford was Zdzislaw Luszowicz, a former SOE agent who had fought in Poland during the Second World War.

In the 1950s, Wheaton Aston was a waypoint in the Goodyear Trophy Race. The race involved competitors flying from Wolverhampton Airport (next to the Goodyear plant in Wolverhampton) and back again in a circle via Pillarton Hall, Penkridge, Wheaton Aston, Ackerley and Wolverhampton again in a 32-mile (51 km) round trip.

Since the mid-1960s, the former base area has been used for pig farming and agricultural purposes, but the outlines of the airfield are still visible on aerial mapping. The airfield, guardhouse and control tower are all registered monuments. Additionally, the eastern perimeter track for the aircraft has been adapted for use as a local road. A study commissioned by the airfield's owners in 2000 declared that the airfield was beyond economic revival.
