= Sleap Airfield =

Airfield in Shropshire, England

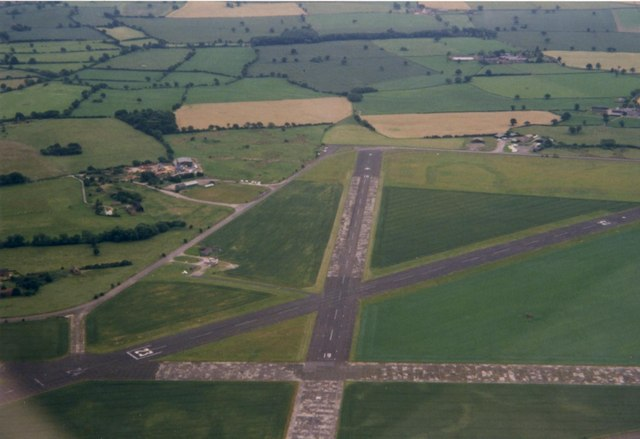
- A view of the airfield from the north
- IATA: none; ICAO: EGCV

Summary
- Airport type: Private
- Operator: Shropshire Aero Club Ltd
- Location: Shrewsbury, Shropshire, England
- Elevation AMSL: 275 ft / 84 m
- Coordinates: 52°50′05″N 002°46′13″W
- Website: http://www.shropshireaeroclub.co.uk

Map
- Location in Shropshire

Runways
Direction	Length		Surface
Direction	m	ft	Surface
05/23	799	2,621	Asphalt
18/36	775	2,543	Asphalt
- Sources: UK AIP at NATS

Sleap Airfield (pronounced "Slape") (IATA: n/a, ICAO: EGCV) is located 10 NM (19 km; 12 mi) north of Shrewsbury, Shropshire, England.

Sleap Aerodrome has a CAA Ordinary Licence (Number P641) that allows flights for the public transport of passengers or for flying instruction as authorised by the licensee (Shropshire Aero Club Limited). It is now home to Shropshire Aero Club, a flying club with over 800 members, 140 based aircraft and holds regular public & member events and airshows. It is one of the busiest general aviation airfields in the UK as of 2026.

Shropshire Aero Club offers training for Private & Commercial pilots, including the Private Pilot's Licence. It has over 150 students learning to fly a year, with a fleet of 12 aircraft. CPL, IR, MEP, Night & Tailwheel ratings are also taught.

The airfield has 2 tarmac runways still in use, 18/36 and 23/05 (which is fully lit for night operations) both nearly 800m long. The airfield has Avgas 100LL and Jet-A1 F34 on site and is open every day of the year. The airfield is used regularly by the MOD helicopters and also has a Long Term Permission from the CAA to allow practice display flights. It has permission from Border Force to allow international flights.

Sleap Airfield is also home to SleapKosh, the biggest fly-in airshow in the UK (as of 2025).

== RAF Sleap ==
Sleap (pronounced "Slape") is an ex-Royal Air Force airfield, which was opened in April 1943, and used by RAF advanced flying training units. Initially it was the base for No. 81 Operational Training Unit RAF (81 OTU) within No. 93 Group RAF (93 Gp) of RAF Bomber Command equipped with Armstrong Whitworth Whitley bomber aircraft.

From 1 January 1944 Sleap was assigned to No.38 Group RAF (38 Gp). 81 OTU's Armstrong-Whitworth Whitleys towed Airspeed Horsa heavy troop-carrying gliders on training missions; the Horsas making practice formation landings at RAF Sleap to simulate attacks in enemy territory. Vickers Wellingtons replaced the Whitleys from November 1944 and by January 1945 the strength was 51 Wellington T.Xs, used to train Transport Command air-crew with Vampires and other early jets being early visitors. The RAF finally released Sleap in 1964, but the location is still used as a relief airfield by nearby RAF Shawbury for Juno and Jupiter aircraft from the DHFS as part of the UKMFTS.

The following units were also here at some point:

- No. 1380 (Transport Support) Conversion Unit RAF
- No. 1665 Heavy Conversion Unit RAF
- Central Navigation and Control School RAF
- Empire Air Navigation School RAF

The Shropshire Aero Club members' bar (also a cafe open to the public) at Sleap was named Eric Lock Lounge after Bayston Hill born Flight Lieutenant Eric Lock the World War II Battle of Britain pilot who was the highest scoring British-born pilot with sixteen and a half victories during the epic battle.

Through the co-operation of the Shropshire Aero Club, the RAF Sleap Heritage Museum operates a small museum on the site, which itself is steeped in history. This all-volunteer group runs the museum from donations only, and is currently open Saturday and Sunday. The displays include a number of aero engines, and a reconstruction of an airfield Flight Office.
