= No. 93 Group RAF =

Former Royal Air Force operations group

No. 93 Group RAF No. 93 (Operational Training) Group No. 93 (Bomber OTU) Group
- Ensign of the Royal Air Force
- Active: 15 June 1942 - 12 February 1945
- Country: United Kingdom
- Branch: Royal Air Force
- Role: Controlled Bomber OTU's
- Part of: RAF Bomber Command
- Last base: Egginton Hall, Egginton, Derby

No. 93 Group RAF is a former Royal Air Force group.

The group was formed on 15 June 1942 at Lichfield under RAF Bomber Command as No. 93 (Operational Training) Group. It moved to Eggington Hall, Egginton, Derby on 7 July 1942 and renamed to No. 93 (Bomber OTU) Group afterwards. It was disbanded on 14 February 1945.

== Structure ==
- February 1943 at Egginton Hall, Derby
  - No. 18 Operational Training Unit RAF at RAF Bramcote with the Vickers Wellington I, III
  - No. 18 Operational Training Unit RAF at RAF Bitteswell with the Vickers Wellington I, III
  - No. 27 Operational Training Unit RAF at RAF Lichfield with the Vickers Wellington I, III
  - No. 27 Operational Training Unit RAF at RAF Church Broughton with the Vickers Wellington I, III
  - No. 28 Operational Training Unit RAF at RAF Wymeswold with the Vickers Wellington I, III
  - No. 28 Operational Training Unit RAF at RAF Castle Donington with the Vickers Wellington I, III
  - No. 30 Operational Training Unit RAF at RAF Hixon with the Vickers Wellington III, X
  - No. 30 Operational Training Unit RAF at RAF Seighford with the Vickers Wellington III, X
- February 1944 at Eggington Hall, Derby
  - No. 18 Operational Training Unit RAF at RAF Finningley with the Vickers Wellington III, X
  - No. 18 Operational Training Unit RAF at RAF Doncaster with the Vickers Wellington III, X
  - No. 27 Operational Training Unit RAF at RAF Lichfield with the Vickers Wellington III, X
  - No. 27 Operational Training Unit RAF at RAF Church Broughton with the Vickers Wellington III, X
  - No. 30 Operational Training Unit RAF at RAF Hixon with the Vickers Wellington III, X
  - No. 30 Operational Training Unit RAF at RAF Seighford with the Vickers Wellington III, X
  - No. 82 Operational Training Unit RAF at RAF Ossington with the Vickers Wellington III, X
  - No. 82 Operational Training Unit RAF at RAF Gamston with the Vickers Wellington III, X
  - No. 83 Operational Training Unit RAF at RAF Peplow with the Vickers Wellington III, X
