= College of Air Traffic Control =

- CATC
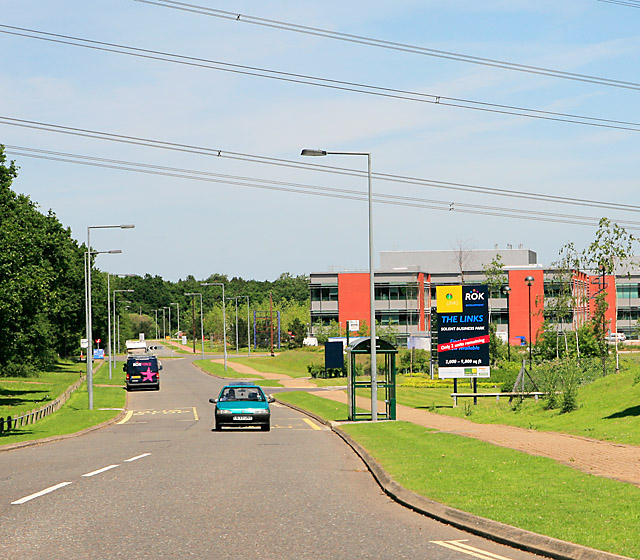
- The site in June 2007

- Location within Hampshire

General information
- Type: College
- Location: Hampshire, PO15 7FL
- Coordinates: 50.882°N 1.241°W
- Elevation: 15 m (49 ft)
- Current tenants: NATS
- Completed: September 2011
- Cost: £10m
- Client: NATS

Technical details
- Floor area: 43,000 sq ft

The College of Air Traffic Control or CATC is the main British non-military training establishment for air traffic control (ATC). It also trains people from other countries.

== History ==
The NATS College of Air Traffic Control was originally in Dorset, started by the Ministry of Aviation as the School of Air Traffic Control in 1949. The college was created by the National Air Traffic Control Service, which was a partly-military organisation. The college in the early 1970s was run by the Air Traffic Control Service.

The new college in Hampshire opened on Monday 26 September 2011.

== Training ==
Once selected for the course, trainee air traffic controllers in the 1990s would take a 72-week-long course, followed by a year of on-site experience.

The training course is two months, from whence the path of training is either an Area Controller (nine months more training) or an Approach Controller (five months more training). There are 120 trainees per year.

Since September 2015, all Norwegian air traffic controllers (for Avinor) train at the college.

== Structure ==
It is situated in the main NATS building, north of junction 9 of the M27. It has six simulator rooms and a 3D aerodrome simulator.

== See also ==
- Central Air Traffic Control School RAF, Shropshire (RAF)
- Centre d'études de la navigation aérienne, comparable organisation in France

== External lists ==
- NATS
