= Andrew George Board =

Royal Air Force Air Commodore (1878–1973)

- Born: 11 May 1878; Westerham, Kent, England
- Died: 25 February 1973 (aged 94); Morfa Bychan, Caernarvonshire, Wales
- Military career
- Allegiance: United Kingdom
- Branch: British Army; Royal Air Force
- Service years: 1898–1931; 1939–1941
- Rank: Air Commodore
- Commands: No. 21 Group RAF (1926–27); RAF Hinaidi (1923–25); No. 1 School of Technical Training RAF (1920–22); 20th (Reserve) Wing (1916–17); 10th Wing RFC (1916); No. 5 Squadron RFC (1915–16); No. 7 Squadron RFC (1914–15)
- Conflicts: First World War; Second World War
- Awards: Companion of the Order of St Michael and St George; Distinguished Service Order
- Other work: Deputy Lieutenant of Caernarvonshire

Air Commodore Andrew George Board, CMG, DSO, DL (11 May 1878 – 25 February 1973) was an English soldier and airman. He was a pioneer aviator, first gaining a licence in 1910, who later became an air commodore in the Royal Air Force.

== Military career ==
Following a time in the militia, Board was commissioned as a second lieutenant in the South Wales Borderers in 1900. In 1910, at his own expense, he learned to fly at Hendon. On 29 November 1910, flying a Bleriot monoplane there, he was awarded the Royal Aero Club Aviator's Certificate No. 36.

In the 1911 Census he was listed as a captain of the 2nd Battalion South Wales Borderers at the Artillery Barracks Pretoria, South Africa.

By 1914, Board had become a flying instructor at the Central Flying School at Netheravon, Wiltshire. On 28 September 1914 he became the officer commanding No. 7 Squadron RFC at Netheravon before moving to the Western Front in April 1915 to command No. 5 Squadron RFC. He later commanded the 10th Wing RFC before taking over 20th (Reserve) Wing in Egypt.

With the formation of the Royal Air Force in 1918, Broad was awarded a permanent commission as a lieutenant colonel. He rose to the rank of air commodore before retiring in 1931. In 1939 he re-joined the RAF as a group captain before retiring again as an air commodore in 1941. In 1943 he became a Deputy Lieutenant in Caernarvon.

== Honours and award ==
- 1 January 1918 Distinguished Service Order to Maj (T /Lt -Col.) Andrew George Board, S W Borderers and RFC for distinguished service in the Field.
- 1 January 1919 Companion of the Order of St Michael and St George to Lt.-Col. (A./Col.) Andrew George Board, DSO, in recognition of distinguished services rendered during the War.

== Family ==
Board was born in Westerham, Kent, on 11 May 1878, the third son of Major John Board and his wife Mary; his father was a magistrate. He married Mrs Phyllis Agnew at St James's Piccadilly on 18 August 1932.
