= RAF Montrose =

Military museum in Angus, Scotland

RAF Montrose
- Montrose, Angus in Scotland

Site information
- Type: Royal Air Force station
- Owner: Air Ministry
- Operator: Royal Air Force
- Controlled by: RAF Fighter Command; RAF Flying Training Command

Location
- Shown within Angus RAF Montrose (the United Kingdom)
- Coordinates: 56°43′44″N 002°27′06″W

Site history
- Built: 1913
- In use: 1913-1952
- Battles/wars: First World War; European theatre of World War II

Airfield information
- Identifiers: ICAO: X6MO
- Elevation: 10 metres (33 ft) AMSL
Runways
Direction	Length and surface
00/00	Grass
00/00	Grass

Royal Air Force Montrose or more simply RAF Montrose is a former Royal Air Force station in Forfarshire (now more commonly called Angus) in Scotland. It became the first operational military aerodrome to be established in the United Kingdom on 26 February 1913.

== History ==
=== First World War ===
In 1912 the British government planned twelve "Air Stations" operated by the Royal Flying Corps. Under the instructions of the First Lord of the Admiralty Winston Churchill, the first of these was at Montrose, allowing aircraft the ability to protect the Royal Navy bases at Rosyth, Cromarty and Scapa Flow.

On 13 February 1913 five aircraft of No. 2 Squadron of the Royal Flying Corps took off from RAF Farnborough under the command of Major C J Burke. The 450 miles (720 km) journey north was completed in a series of stages over the following 13 days. The aircraft landed at Upper Dysart Farm on 26 February, 3 miles (4.8 km) south of Montrose, thus making it the first operational military airfield to be established in the United Kingdom.

Not considering the site ideal, after surveying the area Major Burke obtained an agreement to move the base to Broomfield Farm, 1 mile (1.6 km) north of the town. At the end of 1913 Army Engineers erected three hangars of Indian Army Shed design on the site (known as the "Major Burkes sheds"), enabling the squadron to move there at the start of 1914.

World War I started on 28 July 1914 and in August of that year No.2 squadron moved to France. The first pilot to land in France after the declaration of war was Lieutenant H.D. Harvey-Kelly of No.2 Squadron RFC. Another of the squadrons' pilots, 2nd Lt. W B Rhodes-Moorhouse, became the first pilot to be awarded the Victoria Cross. Unfortunately it was awarded posthumously on 26 April 1915.

No.2 squadron never returned to Montrose but as the war progressed several new ones were stationed there.

Squadrons at Montrose

- No. 2 Squadron RFC 26 February 1913 to August 1914
- No. 6 Reserve Aeroplane Squadron RFC formed July 1915
- No. 25 Squadron – 25 September 1915 from No. 6 Reserve Squadron, flying F.E.2bs on fighter and reconnaissance duties. Moved to France in February 1916
- No. 80 Squadron – 1 September 1917, flying Sopwith Camel. Sent to France at the start of 1918 in a fighter role
- No. 82 (Canadian) Reserve Squadron formed January 1917
- No. 83 Squadron – 7 January 1917, flying the F.E.2b as a bomber, and some FE2d's.
- No. 39 Reserve Squadron RFC formed 26 August 1917
- No. 52 Reserve Squadron RFC September 1917
- No. 36 Reserve Squadron RFC December 1917
- 41st Aero Squadron (Pursuit) US Army Air Service March 1918
- 138th Aero Squadron (Pursuit) US Army Air Service March 1918
- 176th Aero Squadron US Army Air Service March 1918

Other Units at Montrose

- 30th Wing Headquarters RAF April 1918
- No.6 Training Squadron RAF April 1918
- No.18 Training Squadron RAF April 1918
- No.38 Training Squadron RAF April 1918
- No.26 Training Depot Squadron RAF July 1918
- No.32 Training Depot Squadron RAF July 1918

It became a major training airfield with Americans arriving in 1918 to train for the Western Front, and Canadian and British Squadrons forming.

Aircraft flown at Montrose

Armstrong Whitworth F.K.3 : Avro 504 A/J/K : Bristol F.2 B : Bristol Scout C/D: Caudron G.3 : Curtiss JN-4 / JN-3 : Airco DH.1, DH2, DH4, DH6, DH9 : Maurice Farman MF.7 Longhorn: Maurice Farman MF.11 Shortman : Grahame-White Type XV: Martinsyde S.1 : Martinsyde G.100 Elephant : Royal Aircraft Factory B.E.2 b/c/d/e : Royal Aircraft Factory B.E.12 /c : Royal Aircraft Factory F.E.2b : Royal Aircraft Factory F.E.8 : Royal Aircraft Factory R.E.8: Royal Aircraft Factory S.E.5 /a : Sopwith 1-1/2 Strutter : Sopwith Camel : Sopwith Pup : Vickers FB9 :

Royal Flying Corps at Montrose
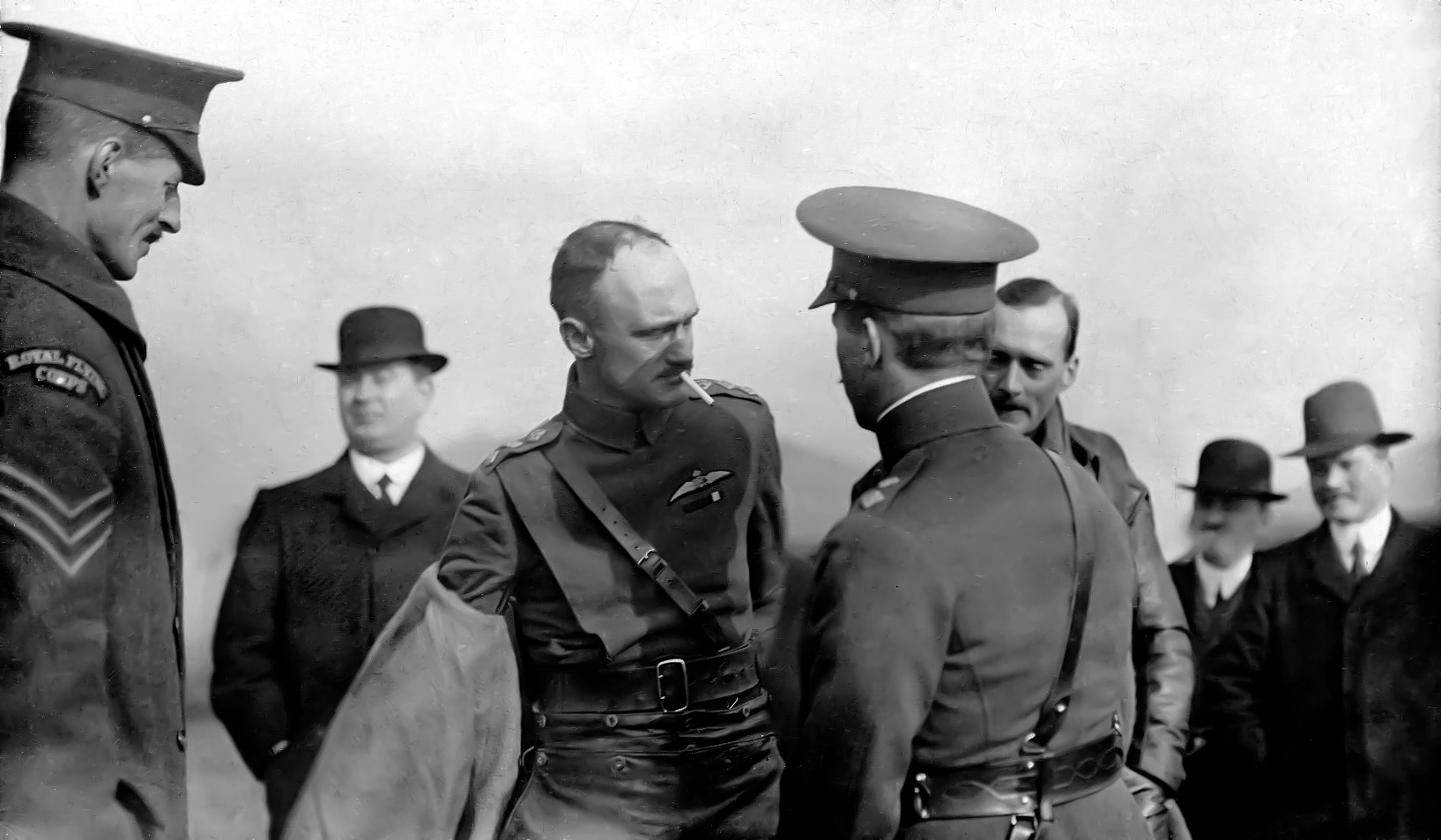
Captain Becke arriving at Upper Dysart February 1913

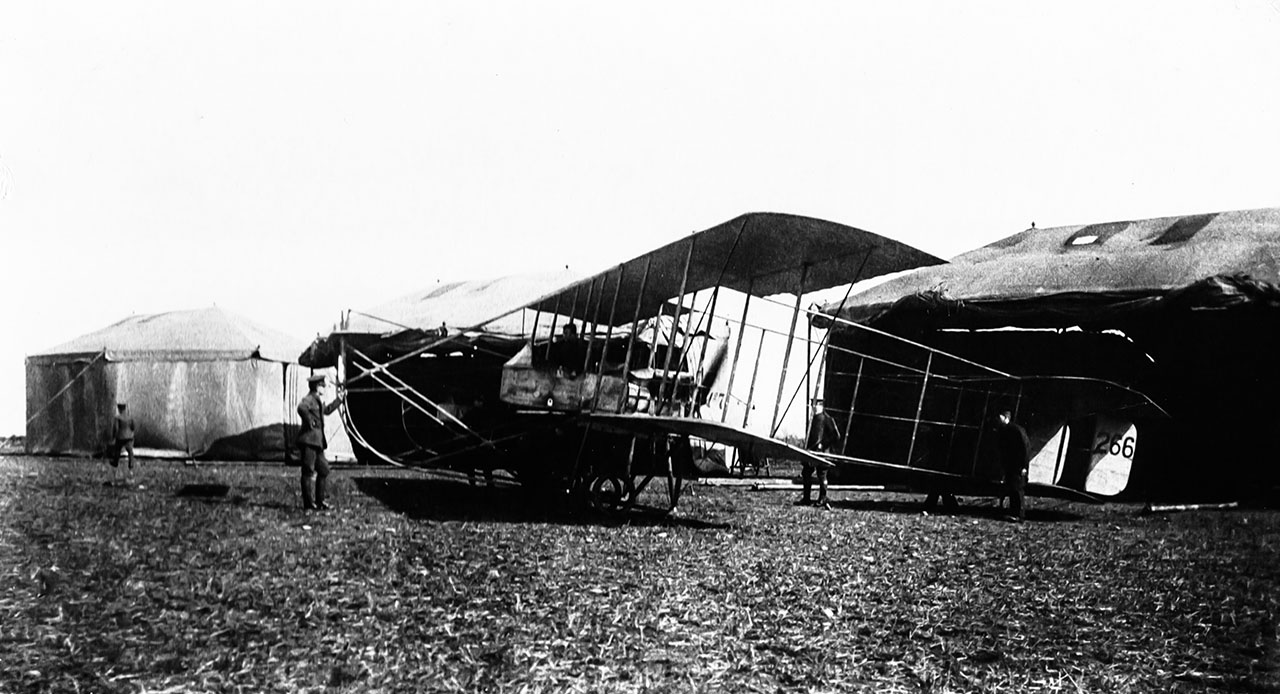
Upper Dysart 1913

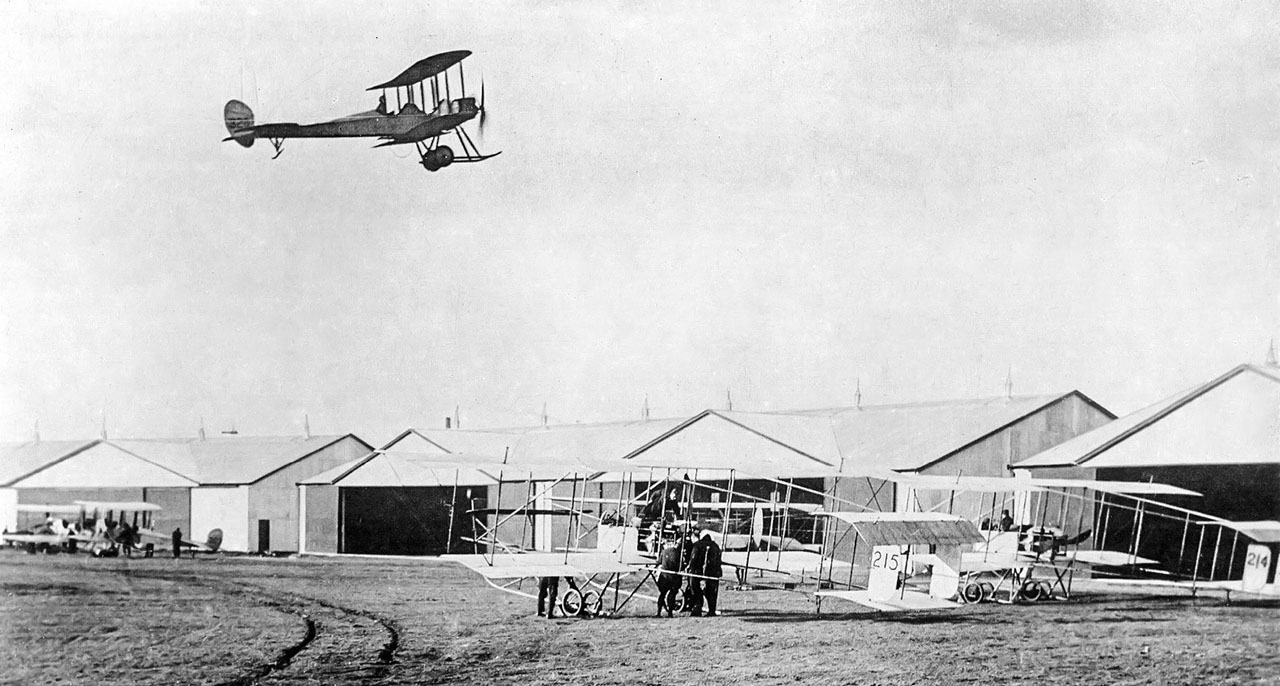
Montrose Air Station Broomfield 1914

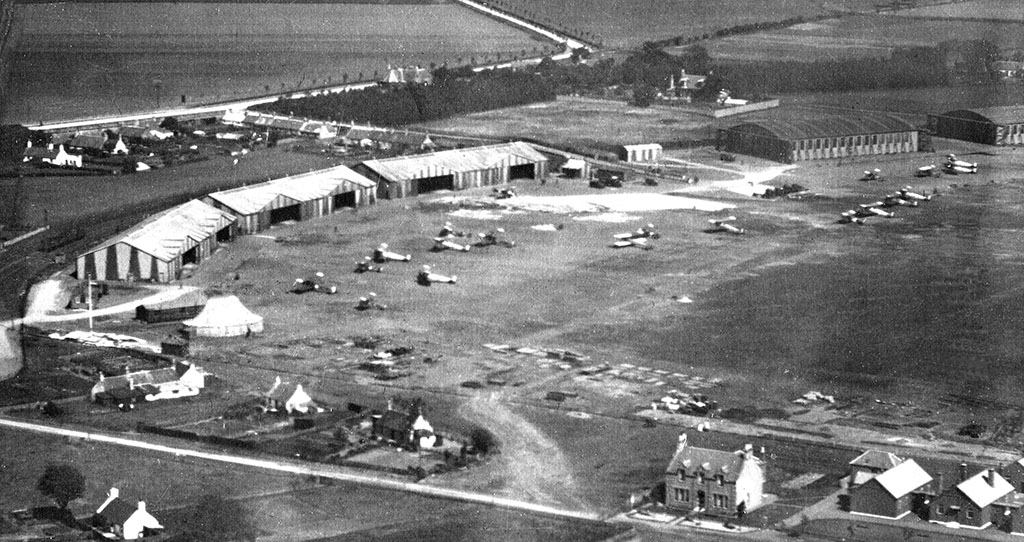
Aerial view of Montrose Air Station Broomfield 1917

=== Between the Wars ===
RAF Montrose closed in 1920. Starting in 1924 the Major Burke's Sheds were again used, this time for the maintenance and refurbishment of Lewis machine guns.

In 1935 the British government decided to expand the RAF in the face of a growing threat from Germany and a key requirement was for more trained military pilots. RAF Montrose, virtually unchanged from the First World War, was re-opened on 1 January 1936 as No. 8 Flying Training School. Between that date and the end of the Battle of Britain an estimated 800 pilots trained and got their 'wings' at Montrose though not all of these became fighter pilots.

Many of the British WWII Fighter Aces were trained at Montrose.

=== Second World War ===
During the Second World War, many fighter squadrons and the Fleet Air Arm served at RAF Montrose. Commonwealth, Polish, Czech, American, Russian, Turkish, Free French and other Allied nationals all trained and served at RAF Montrose during this time.

Operational duties included serving as a location for the Spitfires and Hurricanes which formed part of the air defence for the city of Edinburgh.

From August 1944 RAF Kinnell served as the stations satellite for No. 2 Fighter Interception Squadron until July 1945. The station also flew regular missions to Norway for reconnaissance, supply drops for the Norwegian resistance movement, and entry/exit for Special Operations Executive. On 25 October 1940 three German Junkers Ju 88 aircraft dropped 24 bombs on the station killing five, injuring 18 and destroying two hangars and the officers mess. They and the pilots who died in local training accidents are buried in a Commonwealth War Graves Commission plot in the local church.

Famous RAF pilots and Fighter Aces who were trained or stationed at RAF Station Montrose during WWII.

- Wing Commander Brendan "Paddy" Finucane DSO DFC**
- Flight Lieutenant Richard Hillary
- Flight Lieutenant Brian Carbury DFC*
- Squadron Leader Basil Gerald "Stapme" Stapleton DFC
- Flight Lieutenant George "Screwball" or "Buzz" Beurling DSO DFC DFM
- Wing Commander Tom "Ginger" Neil DFC* AFC AE
- Wing Commander John Freeborn DFC*
- Group Captain Peter Townsend CVO DSO DFC*
- Wing Commander Ian Richard "Widge" Gleed DSO DFC

Squadrons at RAF Montrose

- No. 269 Squadron RAF 25 August 1939 to 10 October 1939
- No. 603 (City of Edinburgh) Squadron RAF January to August 1940
- No. 248 Squadron RAF May to July 1940
- No. 141 Squadron RAF August 1940
- No. 145 Squadron RAF August to October 1940
- No. 111 Squadron RAF October 1940 to July 1941
- No. 17 Squadron RAF August 1941
- No. 232 Squadron RAF April to July 1941
- No. 310 Squadron RAF (Czech) July to December 1941
- No. 132 Squadron RAF July 1941 to February 1942

Other Units at RAF Montrose

The following units were here at some point:

- No. 8 Service Flying Training School RAF 1 January 1936 to 25 March 1942 (No. 8 FTS)
- No. 2 Flying Instructors School RAF January 1942 to July 1945 (No. 2 FIS (Advanced))
- No. 11 Air Sea Rescue Marine Craft Unit 1944
- No. 8 Anti-Aircraft Practice Camp RAF
- No. 21 Group RAF
- No. 44 Maintenance Unit RAF
- No. 260 Maintenance Unit RAF
- No. 1632 (Anti-Aircraft Co-operation) Flight RAF
- No. 2749 Squadron RAF Regiment
- No. 2789 Squadron RAF Regiment
- ((RAF Mountain Rescue Service MRT 1944–53)) <RAF Mountain Rescue Association archivist Brian Canfer>

Aircraft flown at RAF Montrose

Airspeed Oxford Mk I : Avro Anson Mk I : Avro Tutor : Boulton Paul Defiant Mk I : Bristol Beaufighter Mk IC : Bristol Beaufort Mk IIA : Bristol Blenheim Mk I : de Havilland Don : de Havilland Hornet : de Havilland Moth : de Havilland Tiger Moth II : Gloster Gauntlet : Gloster Gladiator I : Hawker Fury : Hawker Hart Trainer/ Audax : Hawker Hind : Hawker Hurricane Mk I, IIA, IIB, IIc :Hawker Typhoon : Lockheed Hudson VI : Miles Magister : Miles Martinet TT MkI : Miles Master I/II/III : North American Harvard IIb (T-6 Texan) : Percival Proctor P.30 II : Supermarine Spitfire Mk I, IIA, IIB, VA, VB, VC, VI, XI. : Supermarine Walrus : Westland Lysander Mk II, III, IIIA: Westland Whirlwind I : Fairey Gordon:

=== Postwar ===
During 1948 it was home to No 63 Maintenance Unit (No 63 MU) and aircraft for repair were brought in and shipped out by road as there were no tarmac runways. Activity was minimal until the crisis in Hong Kong and the onset of the Korean War when the unit became very busy. RAF Montrose closed permanently on 4 June 1952.

=== Mountain Rescue ===
Whilst Montrose is relatively flat the area is bounded by mountains and aircraft crashes on them were not uncommon. RAF Station Montrose (Montrose Air Station) had carried out mountain rescues on an ad hoc basis but in January 1944 the RAF formed the Royal Air Force Mountain Rescue Service. Ten teams were put together and one of these was located here at Montrose. In 1945 the team was moved to nearby RAF Edzell only to be moved out of the area in 1946. In 1949 a Mountain Rescue Team (MRT) of the RAF Mountain Rescue Service was established at RAF Montrose to cover the area of the central Grampians. This improved the emergency rescue facilities for the whole of Scotland with teams at RAF Kinloss covering the north and RAF West Freugh the west. In 1950 it again moved back to RAF Edzell. In 1955 they moved to RAF Leuchars and have remained there.

== Accidents ==
During the Aerodrome's early days as a pilot training facility an American pilot wrote that there was "a crash every day and a funeral every week". The military gravestones at the local cemetery, Sleepy Hillock, bear witness to the numerous deaths of those learning to fly at Montrose.

== Ghost stories ==
RAF Station Montrose has been described by believers as one of the most haunted places in Britain.

Lt Desmond Arthur was killed in a flying accident on 27 May 1913, his spirit is said to have haunted the officers' mess. Since then there have been many other claimed sightings of apparitions in pilots' uniforms and phantom planes. In 2010 it was claimed wartime music and speech was heard to come from a 70-year-old radio which was "not powered in any way".

== Montrose Air Station Heritage Centre ==
In 1983 the Montrose Air Station Heritage Trust was formed, which went on to become The Ian McIntosh Memorial Trust. In 1992 the trust purchased the Watch Office and ground, and created the Montrose Air Station Heritage Centre. They have since added more buildings and collections. Several historic buildings and hangars are still located on site, and the perimeter taxi track is still largely intact.
