= Defence College of Air and Space Operations =

UK Air Operations Branch training establishment

- College badge
- Active: 1 January 2019 – present
- Country: United Kingdom
- Branch: Royal Air Force; Royal Navy
- Type: Defence training college
- Role: Air traffic control and battlespace management training
- Part of: Directorate of Flying Training
- Station: RAF Shawbury
- Motto: Exercemur ut praemuniamus (Latin for 'We are exercised/trained so that we are protected/prepared')

The Defence College of Air and Space Operations is the UK's training establishment for all military Air Operations Branch such as air traffic controllers (ATCs), Weapons controllers, Identification Officers, Flight Operations personnel and Air and Space Operations Specialists sited at RAF Shawbury in Shropshire, England.

It was created by the bringing together of the School of Air Operations Control (SAOC) and the School of Aerospace Battle Management (SABM) on 1 January 2019 under one command on one site.

In 1972 the Area Radar School at RAF Sopley in south-west Hampshire moved to Shawbury, being known as the Area Radar Training School.

== History ==
=== History of School of Air Operations Control (SAOC) ===
The School of Air Operations Control started out as the Regional Control School during September 1940 at RAF Mildenhall, moving to Brasenose College, Oxford on 10 May 1941. It was redesignated on 15 December 1941 to the School of Flying Control at RAF Watchfield provide training for air traffic controllers, moved to RAF Bridgnorth on 15 November 1942 with the aircraft using RAF Bobbington. A detachment was left a Watchfield to the create the Airfield Controllers School, the school returned to Watchfield on 14 November 1943 and the controllers school was integrated into the Flying Control School. On 1 November 1946 the school was renamed to the School of Air Traffic Control and joined No. 50 Group RAF, it was transferred to No. 25 Group RAF on 21 April 1947. The School was disbanded into the Central Navigation and Control School on 10 February 1950.

Badge of the School of Air Operations

No. 2 School of Air Navigation was formed on 21 October 1940 at RAF Cranage within No. 21 Group RAF training navigators, on 20 May 1942 the school moved to No. 25 Group RAF. Shortly afterwards on 14 August 1942 the school was renamed to the Central Navigation School still at Cranage, on 11 February 1944 the school moved to RAF Shawbury and redesignated as the Empire Air Navigation School on 28 October 1944. The school developed new navigation techniques and taught advanced navigation training with No. 21 Group RAF. It was renamed back on 31 July 1949 and on 10 February 1950 the school was renamed to the Central Navigation and Control School by merging the School of Air Traffic Control in. The new school used relief landing grounds at RAF Sleap and RAF High Ercall until being renamed to the Central Air Traffic Control School on 11 January 1963. The school soon became under the control of RAF Support Command, and on 8 October 1976 it came under the control of No. 2 Flying Training School RAF. From 4 July 1989 the use of aircraft was discontinued with the training being completed using computers.

In 1963, the first three women to become air traffic controllers qualified at the school: Flying Officer G. Lord, Flight Officer S. Grieve and Pilot Officer A.P. Scougal. Chrystine Anne Lord, born 4 September 1939, of Hornby Road, Lytham St Annes, was the former head girl of Queen Mary School at Lytham St Annes, who had joined the WRAF in October 1958, and had been at Hack Green, near Nantwich, since June 1961. Shirley Grieve, 35, was from Helions Bumpstead near Haverhill, in Suffolk. Shirley served in the WRAF for 22 years until 1975, becoming a Flight Lieutenant. Ann Patricia Scougal, 26, was from Yarm Road, in Darlington.

=== History of School of Aerospace Battle Management RAF (SABM) ===
The School of Aerospace Battle Management began on 25 January 1945 at RAF Drem as the SCR.584 Training Unit RAF, this unit used Supermarine Spitfires to train crews how to use the SCR.584 anti-aircraft gun-laying radar, the unit moved to RAF Manston on 26 May 1945 joining No. 11 Group RAF. It was disbanded into the Fighter Command Control and Reporting School on 19 December 1945. The Control and Reporting School was based at RAF Rudloe Manor and used RAF Middle Wallop for an aircraft base. From 19 October 1946 it used Spitfires and an Avro Anson from a unit based at RAF Colerne with the school moving to Middle Wallop on 12 January 1948. The unit was renamed to just the School of Control and Reporting on 16 March 1953 with the previously borrowed aircraft returned crewed by School personnel and new aircraft and pilots borrowed from No. 288 Squadron RAF. On 9 September 1957 the School of Fighter Control was formed at RAF Hope Cove from an element of the Control and Reporting School, the school used as RAF Hurn as a base for its Hawker Hunters and de Havilland Vampires until it was disbanded at RAF Sopley during 1961. On 30 September 1957 the Control and Reporting School at Middle Wallop was disbanded and became the School of Fighter Plotting within No. 81 Group RAF still at Middle Wallop using Boulton Paul Balliols. The new school was disbanded on 1 March 1958.

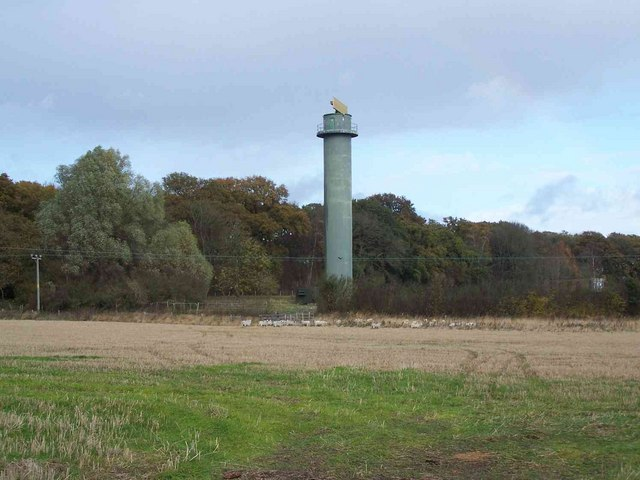
Shawbury radar tower in February 2011

On 1 October 1968 the School of Fighter Control was reformed as the School of Control and Reporting at RAF Bawdsey although the name would appear to have reverted to School of Fighter Control while in residence there and prior to its move to RAF West Drayton on 31 October 1974 and to RAF Boulmer on 1 May 1990. At some point the school was renamed to the School of Aerospace Battle Management, in 2019 the school was moved to RAF Shawbury and was joined with the School of Air Operations Control within the Defence College of Air and Space Operations.

== Structure ==
The DCASO also houses the Flight Operations Training School for Flight Operations Officers. Much of the training is done on computers, with the Computer Systems Squadron (CSS).

== See also ==
- College of Air Traffic Control, Hampshire, previously in Dorset
- Defence Helicopter Flying School, also at Shawbury, now No. 1 Flying Training School RAF
- UK Military Flying Training System
- United Kingdom Low Flying System (UKLFS)
