= Andrew McKee (RAF officer) =

Royal Air Force Air Marshal (1902–1988)

Sir Andrew McKee
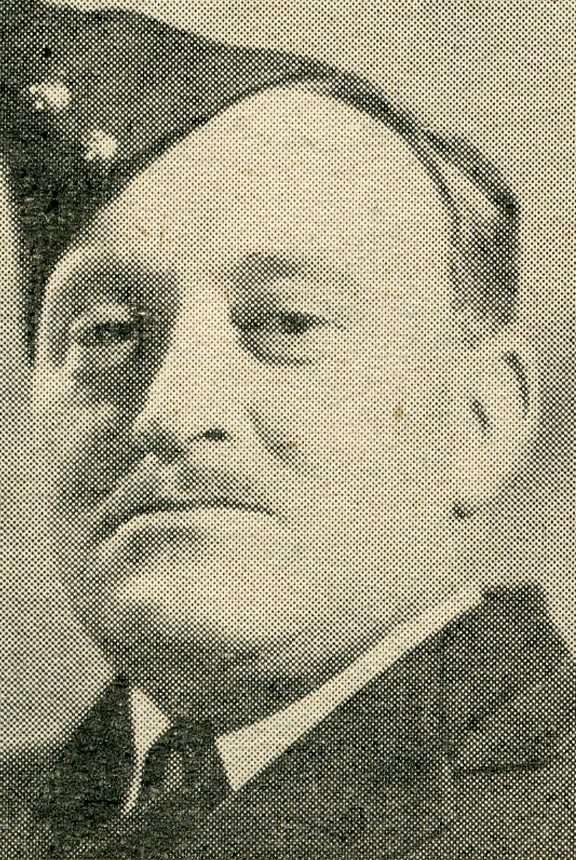
- Born: 10 January 1902; Oxford, New Zealand
- Died: 8 December 1988 (aged 86)
- Military career
- Allegiance: United Kingdom
- Branch: Royal Air Force
- Service years: 1927–1959
- Rank: Air marshal
- Commands: RAF Transport Command (1955–59); No. 21 Group (1951–53); RAF Flying College (1949–51); Officer Advanced Training School (1947–49); No. 205 Group (1945–46); RAF Downham Market (1942–43); RAF Marham (1941–42); No. 9 Squadron (1940)
- Conflicts: Second World War
- Awards: Knight Commander of the Order of the Bath; Commander of the Order of the British Empire; Distinguished Service Order; Distinguished Flying Cross; Air Force Cross; Mentioned in Despatches (3)

Air Marshal Sir Andrew McKee, KCB, CBE, DSO, DFC, AFC (10 January 1902 – 8 December 1988) was a Royal Air Force officer who served as Air Officer Commanding-in-Chief at RAF Transport Command from 1955 to 1959.

== RAF career ==
McKee joined the Royal Air Force (RAF) in 1927. He served in pilot roles in India and the United Kingdom before joining the Air Staff at Headquarters No. 3 Group in 1938. He served in the Second World War as Officer Commanding No. 9 Squadron and then as Station Commander at RAF Marham before becoming Air Officer Commanding No. 205 Group in April 1945.

After the war McKee was appointed Senior Air Staff Officer at Headquarters Middle East Air Force and was then made Commandant of the Officer Advanced Training School in 1947. He went on to be Commandant of the RAF Flying College in 1949, Air Officer Commanding No. 21 Group in 1951 and Senior Air Staff Officer at Headquarters RAF Bomber Command in 1953. His final post was as Air Officer Commanding-in-Chief at RAF Transport Command in 1955 during which period he saw the introduction of the Comet 2 before he retired in 1959.

== Later life ==
In retirement McKee was Deputy Chairman of the National Airways Corporation and a Director of Air New Zealand.

Military offices
Preceded by Sir George Beamish	Air Officer Commander-in-Chief Transport Command; 1955–1959	Succeeded by Sir Denis Barnett
