= RAF Ossington =

Former Royal Air Force station in Nottinghamshire, England

RAF Ossington
- Ossington, Nottinghamshire in England
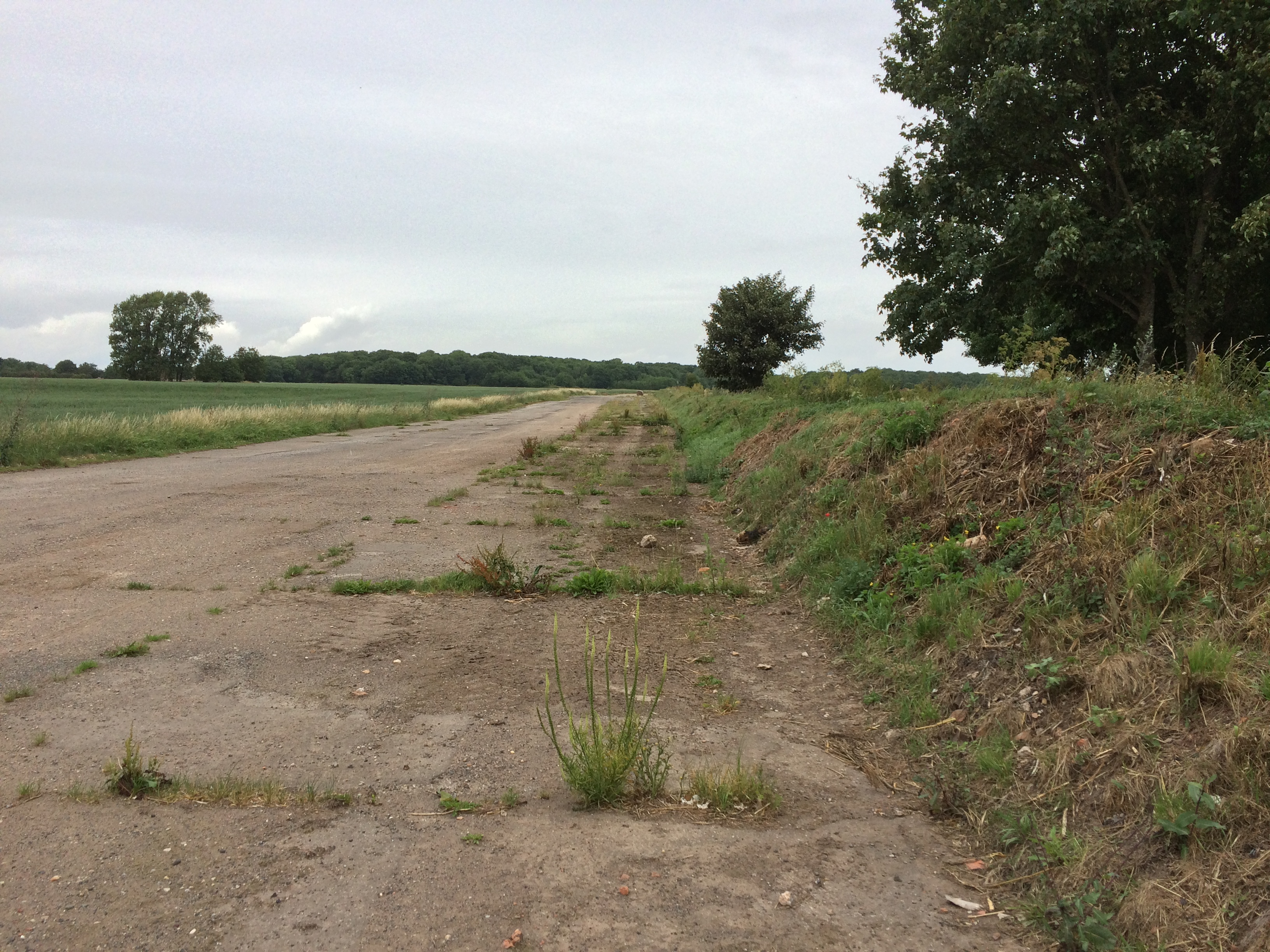

Site information
- Type: Royal Air Force station
- Code: ON
- Owner: Air Ministry
- Operator: Royal Air Force
- Controlled by: RAF Flying Training Command; RAF Bomber Command * No. 93 (OTU) Group RAF; RAF Transport Command
- Condition: Disused

Location
- Shown within Nottinghamshire
- Coordinates: 53°10′37″N 0°53′15″W

Site history
- Built: 1941
- In use: January 1942 - August 1946
- Battles/wars: Second World War

Airfield information
- Elevation: 54 metres (177 ft) AMSL
Runways
Direction	Length and surface
05/23	Concrete
07/25	Concrete
12/30	Concrete

Royal Air Force Ossington or more simply RAF Ossington is a former Royal Air Force station located near the village of Ossington, Nottinghamshire, England.

== History ==
Construction of the airfield began in 1941, with the aim of completion by 1942. It was constructed as a standard A-shaped bomber airfield with 3 hard runways, the longest of the 3 being just over 1.5 km long. After completion, the airfield was placed under No. 5 Group, RAF Bomber Command.

In January 1942, the airfield became an RAF Flying Training Command station flying Airspeed Oxfords. May 1943 saw No. 14 (Pilots) Advanced Flying Unit move to RAF Banff.

After this period, the airfield returned to the control of Bomber Command, No. 93 Group and became a satellite station of RAF Gamston. On 1 June 1943 No. 82 Operational Training Unit RAF formed using Vickers Wellingtons as was standard at the time, along with 5 Miles Martinets as target tugs for gunner training.

On 9 August 1943, a crew from RAF Ossington was lost after the starboard engine of their Vickers Wellington X (MS471) during a cross-country training exercise. On 21 August 1943, Vickers Wellington X (HE332) collided with trees on its landing approach after another cross-country training exercise. Again, later in the year, the crew of Vickers Wellington III (BK387) encountered low fog and hit high ground at Tewitt Hall Wood. On 22 May 1944 a midair collision occurred between Vickers Wellington III (BJ819) and Supermarine Spitfire I (P7820). The pilot of the Spitfire, Flying Officer John Smith, aged 21, from Burton-upon-Trent, was killed when his aircraft crashed in Lea Road, Gainsborough. Witnesses quoted in the Lincolnshire Echo said he stayed with the aircraft to avoid nearby houses. A married man, he was attached to 53 OTU, RAF Kirton-in-Lindsey, Lincolnshire. The Wellington pilot, Flying Officer JP Lee, received a commendation for bravery for saving his crew. The collision happened during a cine-gun training exercise involving the Spitfire intercepting the Wellington.

In June 1944, the OTU was joined at RAF Ossington by No. 1685 (Bomber) Defence Training Flight with Curtiss Tomahawks where they stayed briefly. No. 82 OTU stayed until January 1945, when they were disbanded.

Like many stations, RAF Ossington was transferred to RAF Transport Command where pilots were trained to fly Avro Lancasters and Avro Lancastrians on the London to New Zealand route.

Eventually, the runways were broken up for the construction of the A1 (though some taxiways and buildings have survived).

== Units ==
The following units were here at some point:

- No. 6 Lancaster Finishing School RAF between 1 January and 1 November 1945
- No. 14 Service Flying Training School RAF between 19 and 26 January 1942 became No. 14 (Pilots) Advanced Flying Unit RAF between 26 January 1942 and 25 May 1943
- No. 28 Operational Training Unit RAF temporarily between 6 and 18 June 1943
- No. 82 OTU between 1 June 1943 and 9 January 1945
- No. 1384 (Heavy Transport) Conversion Unit RAF between 1 November 1945 and 30 June 1946
- No. 1685 (Bomber) Defence Training Flight RAF between 5 June 1943 and 21 August 1944
- No. 2840 Squadron RAF Regiment
- Squadron & Flight Commanders School RAF formed here on 16 July 1945, moved to Doncaster the same day
- Transport Command Night Vision Instructors Training School RAF between 10 July 1945 and 1 January 1946

== Current use ==
On 28 May 2022, Airfields of Britain Conservation Trust unveiled a memorial to the units and personnel based at the airfield which stands at the side of the main road through the site, where the two runways once crossed, with the site now being used as farmland.

== Gallery ==
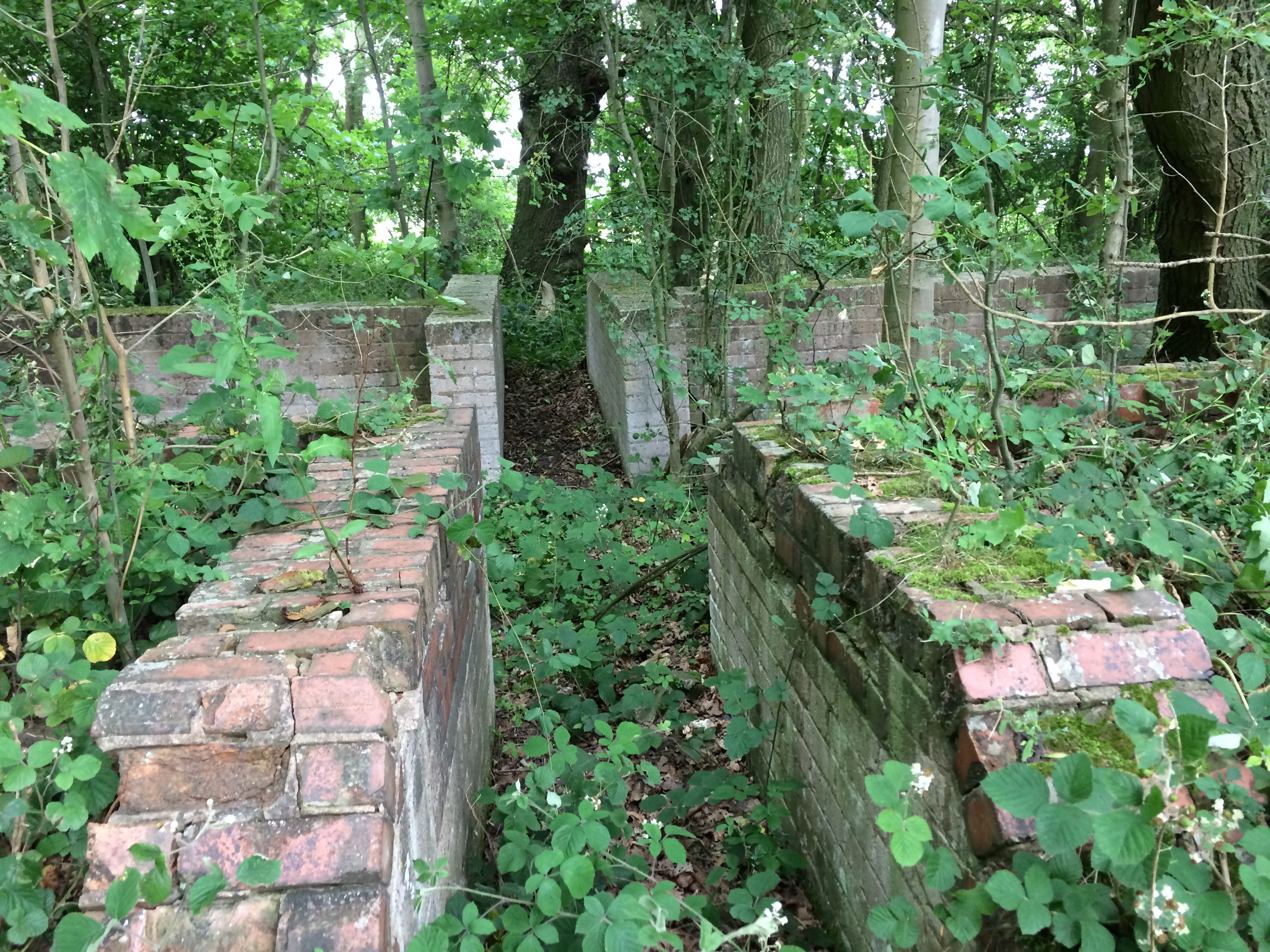

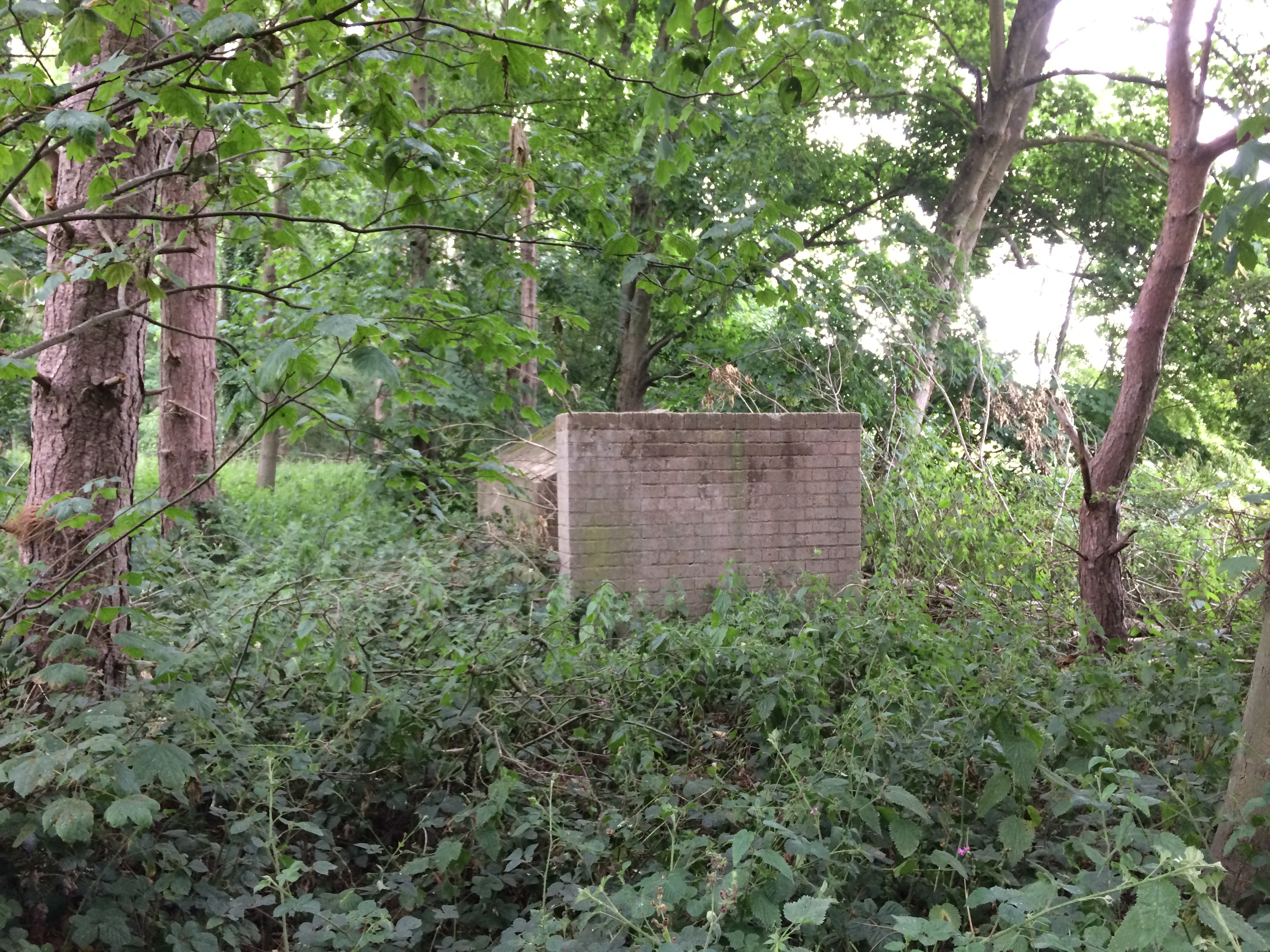

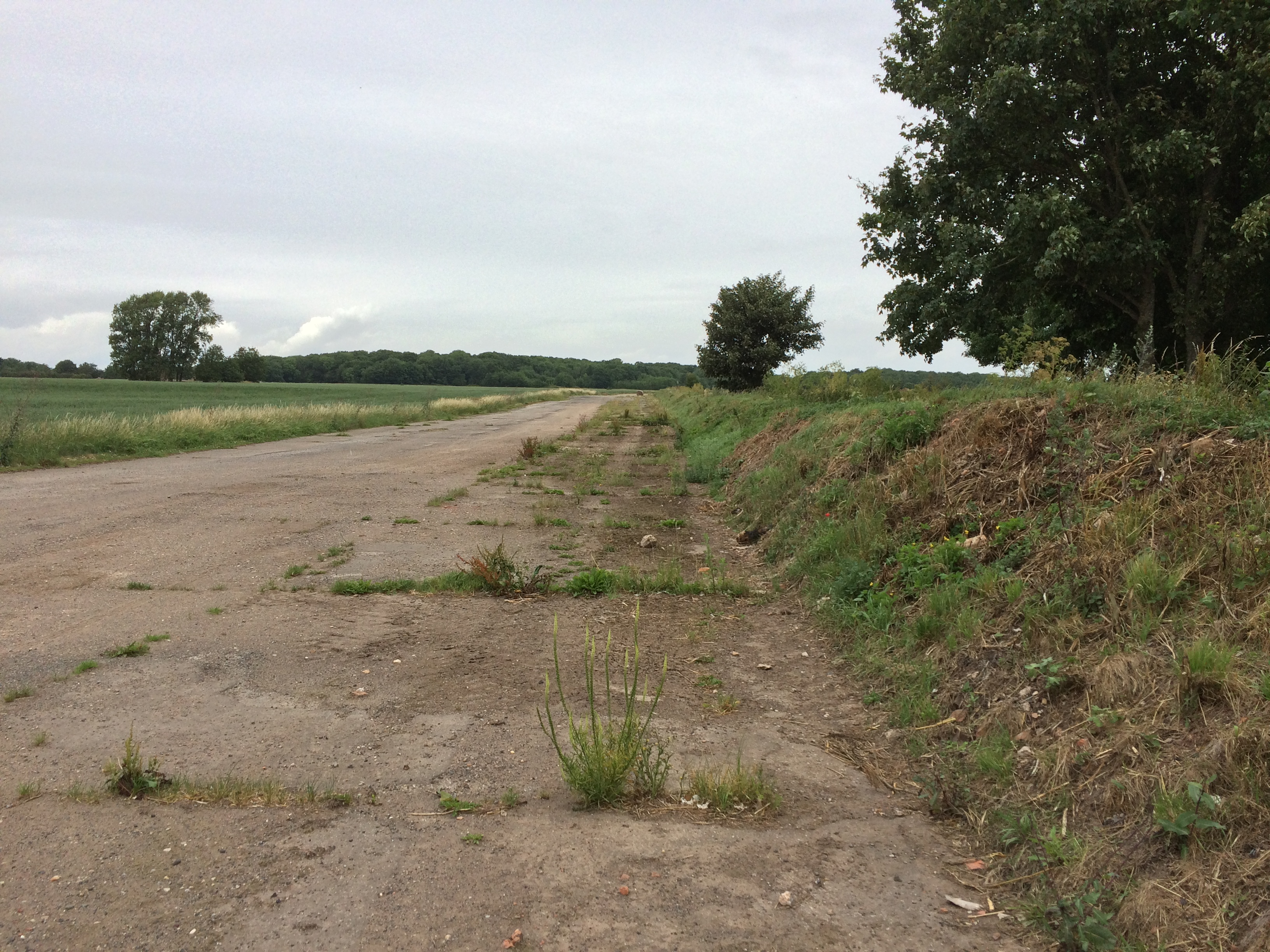

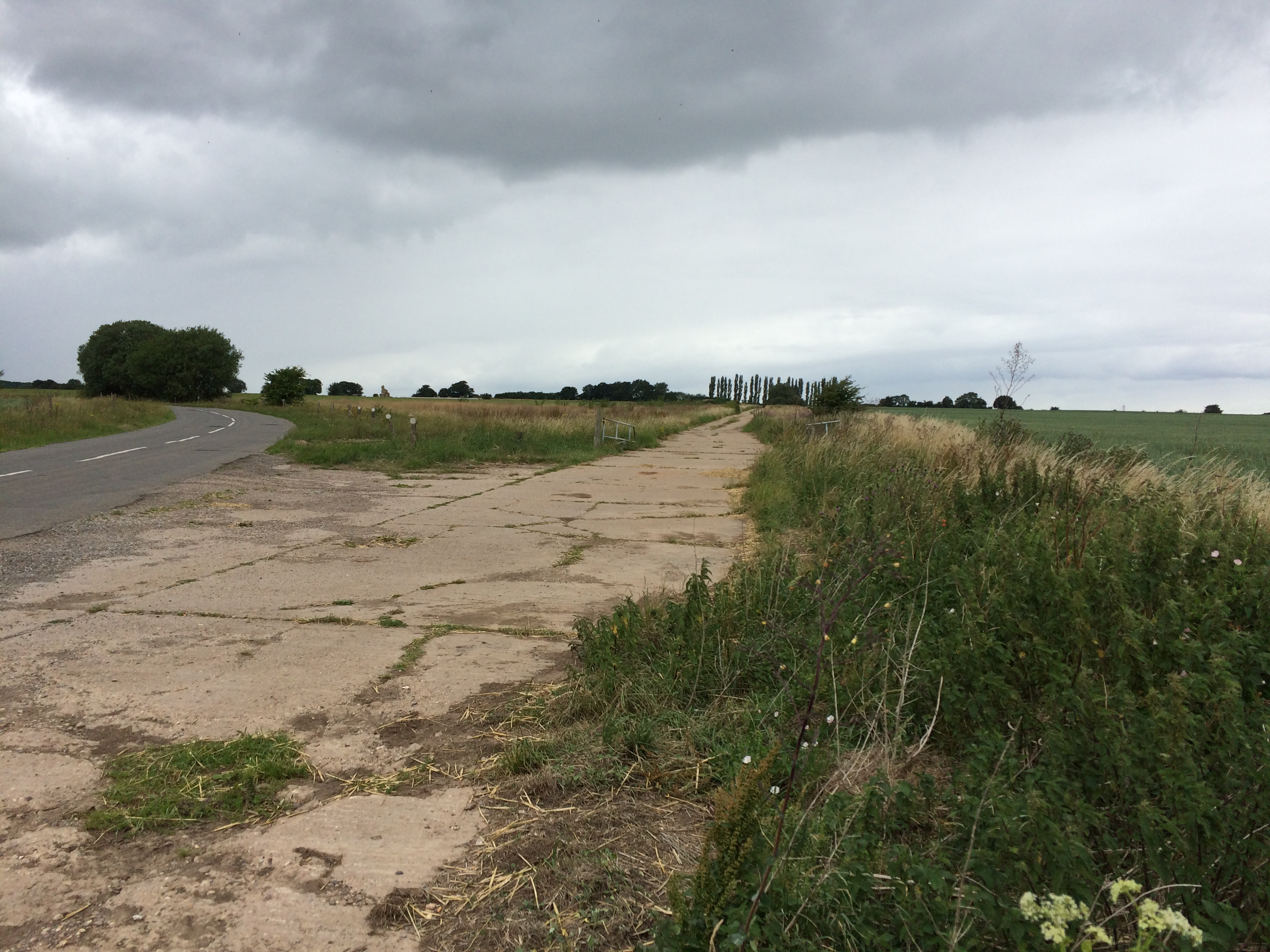
