= Little Onn =

Hamlet in Staffordshire, England

Coordinates: 52.7353°N 2.2299°W

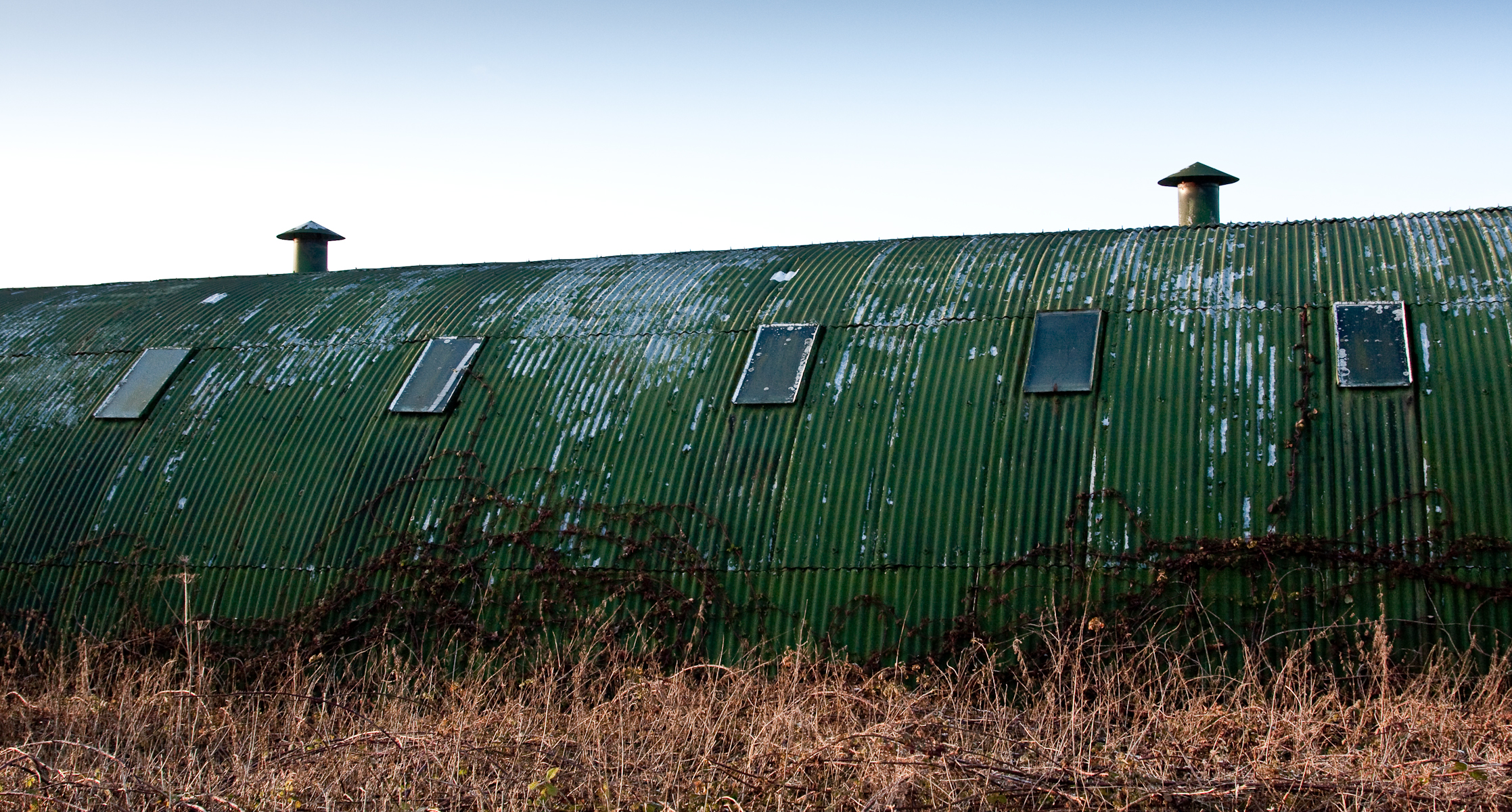
- Disused hangar at the former airfield in Little Onn

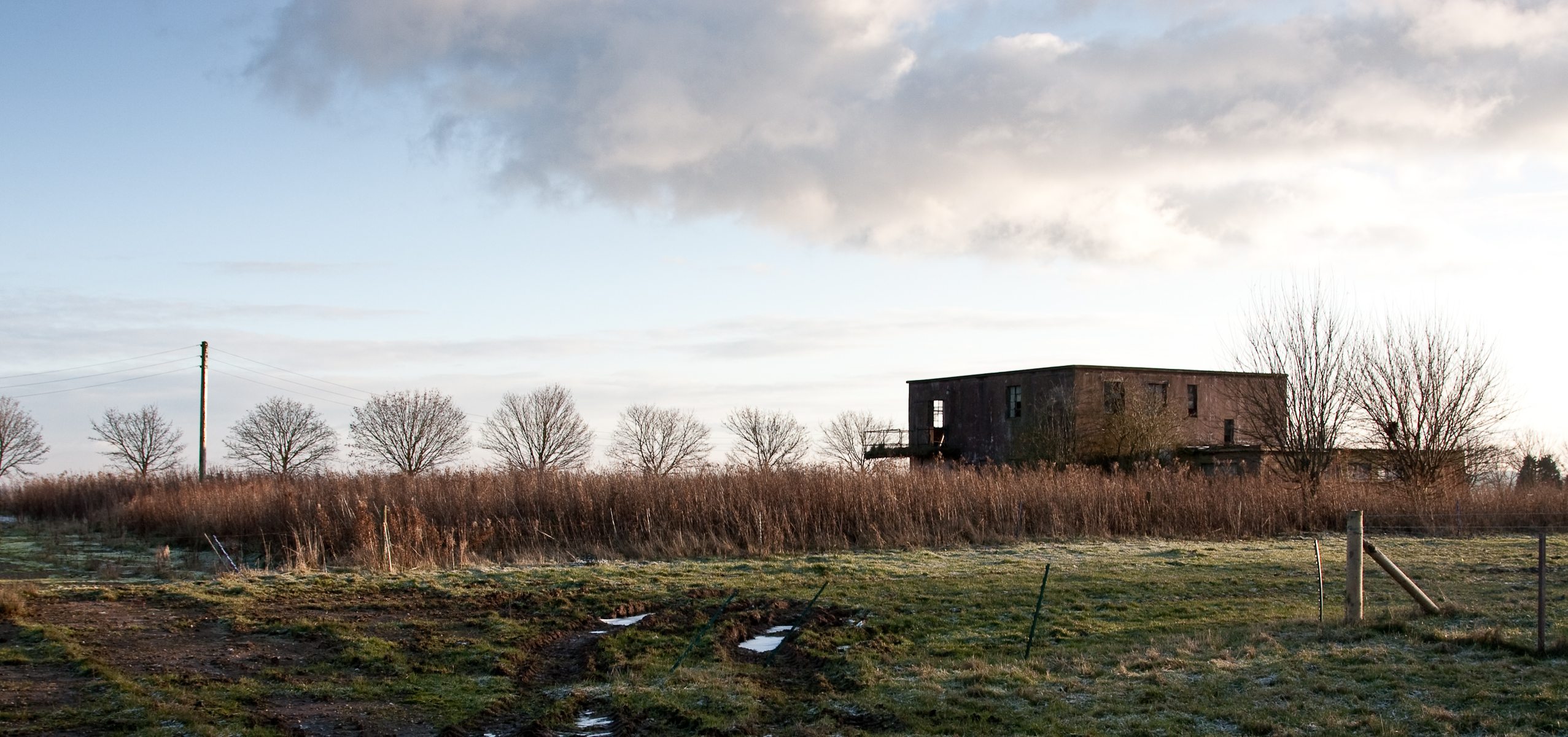
- Disused watch tower

- Location within Staffordshire
- OS grid reference: SJ839160
- Shire county: Staffordshire
- Region: West Midlands
- Country: England
- Sovereign state: United Kingdom
- Police: Staffordshire
- Fire: Staffordshire
- Ambulance: West Midlands

Little Onn is a hamlet in Staffordshire, England located in open countryside 1 mile (2 km) north of Wheaton Aston.

It is the location of the former Second World War airfield RAF Wheaton Aston, a training school - one of the busiest in the country - that operated between 1941 and 1947. Since being abandoned the airfield has become a pig farm but many of the original buildings remain.

The Little Onn estate was held from the 17th century by the Earls of Bradford and their descendents, until it was sold in 1818 to the Crockett family. Little Onn Hall is a large 19th century country house, formerly the home of the Ashton family.

The Shropshire Union Canal Main Line passes through Little Onn.
