= RAF Hixon =

Former Royal Air Force station in Staffordshire, England

RAF Hixon
- Hixon, Staffordshire in England
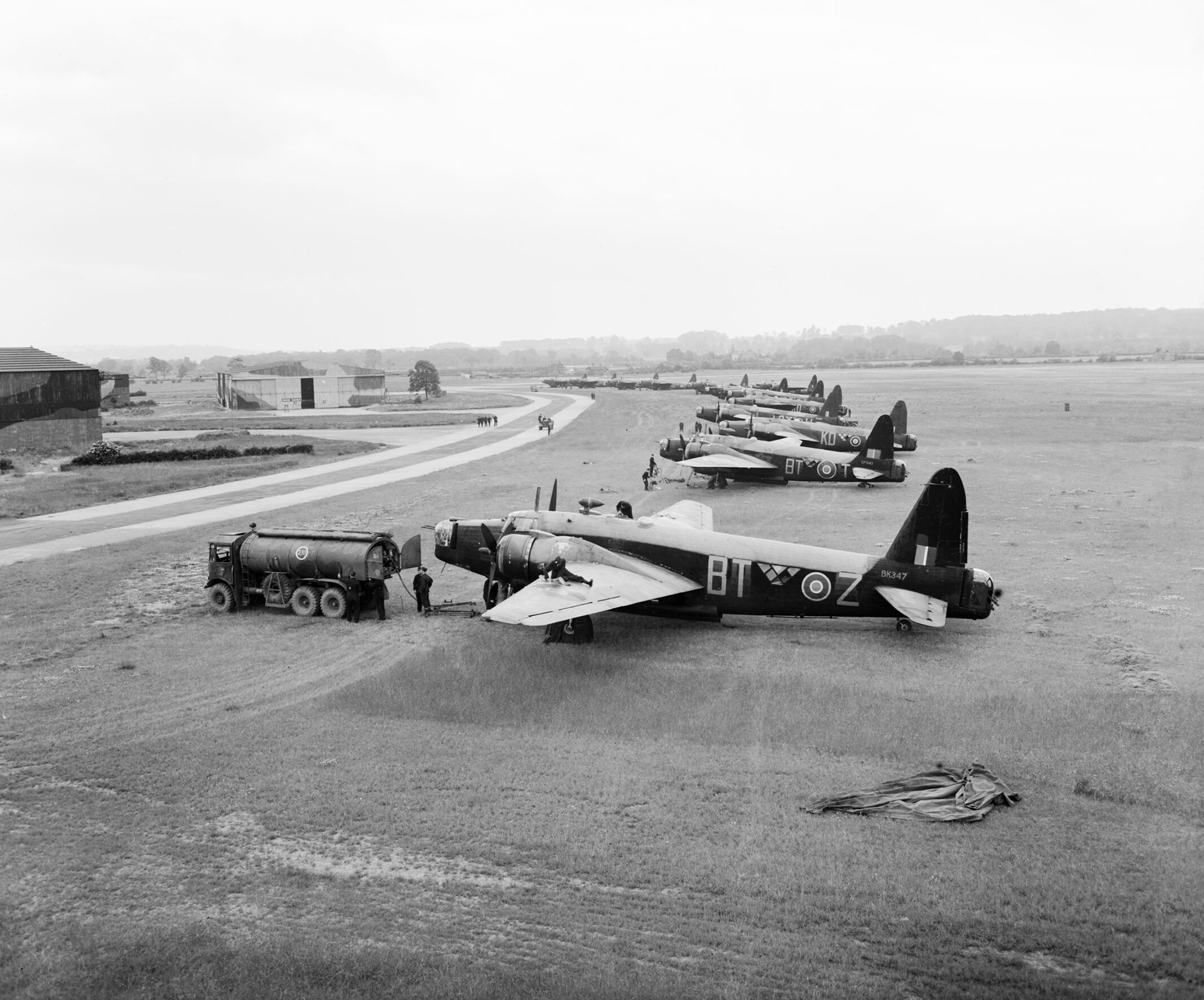
- Wellington Mk III aircraft of No. 30 Operational Training Unit at RAF Hixon.

Site information
- Type: Royal Air Force station satellite station 1942 parent station 1942-57
- Code: HX
- Owner: Air Ministry
- Operator: Royal Air Force
- Controlled by: RAF Bomber Command * No. 93 (OTU) Group RAF

Location
- Coordinates: 52°50′11″N 02°00′32″W
- Height: 267 feet (81 m)

Site history
- Built: 1941-1942
- Built by: Trollope & Cole
- In use: May 1942 – November 1957
- Materials: Tarmac

Airfield information
- Elevation: 81 metres (266 ft) AMSL
Runways
Direction	Length and surface
22/06	1,650 yd (1,510 m) Concrete
28/10	1,400 yd (1,300 m) Concrete
34/16	1,200 yd (1,100 m) Concrete

Royal Air Force Hixon or more simply RAF Hixon is a former Royal Air Force station located on the north western edge of the village of Hixon in Staffordshire, England. The airfield was 7.5 miles (12.1 km) east of Stafford and bounded at the west and north by railways.

After opening in 1942, it served as a base for No. 30 Operational Training Unit and, after the OTU left up until its closure in 1957, it served as a satellite site for No. 16 Maintenance Unit based at RAF Stafford.

== History ==
Permission was granted to build a base at Hixon in August 1941 with opening coming on 13 May 1942. The base was to be used for operational flying, but instead it was used as a training environment for Bomber aircrews flying Vickers Wellington aircraft on No. 30 OTU, Curtiss Tomahawks and Hawker Hurricanes on 1686 Bomber (Defence) Training Flight (BDTF) and Bristol Blenheims flown by No. 12 (Pilots) Advanced Flying Unit ((P)AFU). It was originally intended to be a No. 7 Group asset, but when it was handed over to the Royal Air Force from the contractors in June 1942, No.92 Group became its owner. Even then there was another change; it became a No.93 Group asset six weeks later.

As a night bomber training unit, crews from Hixon were often sent on missions to France and sometimes even Germany to drop propaganda leaflets (PsyOps). These missions were often called after their codename, 'Nickel Raids'. These night-time raids were just as dangerous as actual bombing runs as the enemy had no way of determining that they were only dropping leaflets.

In early 1943, No. 25 OTU based at RAF Finningley was disbanded and the Wellington aircraft and groundcrews were sent to Hixon. The personnel and assets were shared out with RAF Seighford. In June of the same year, No. 1686 Bomber (Defence) Training Flight (BDTF) was formed at Hixon for 'Bullseye' training. No.1686 was equipped with P-40 Tomahawk aircraft which were formerly used by No. 112 Squadron in North Africa and still retained their distinctive Sharks Teeth markings under the nose of the aircraft. The Tomahawks (and later, Hurricanes) were used so that the turret operators could practice against fighter attack whilst airborne.

Bomber Command gave No. 30 OTU more responsibility in January 1944 when the unit was tasked for Air Sea Rescue in addition to its training programme. The flights were piloted and commanded by instructors on the OTU, but aircrews under training would make up the rest of the complement.

RAF Seighford was opened up as a satellite and Relief Landing Ground for RAF Hixon and No.30 OTU when RAF Wheaton Aston became busier and ceased being RAF Hixon's stand-by airfield. Quite often, aircrews would have to get their aircraft across to RAF Seighford before missions could begin as the runway at RAF Hixon was not long enough for bombers laden with 4,000 lb (1,800 kg) bombs. Seighford was also able to operate when Hixon had to cease operations due to the weather closing in despite there being only a 7.5-mile (12 km) distance between the two.

The aircraft were experiencing mechanical failure due to age and daily use; the attrition rate of this was very high. Coupled to the fact that it was a training unit, accidents were rife. After several crashes where the airframes came to rest just beside or even on the railway tracks on at least two occasions, special phone lines were installed between the tower and the signalling staff controlling the railway, for use in the event of an airframe fouling the railway lines.

As Hixon was close to the United States Army Air Force (USAAF) base at Stone, the airfield was visited by a myriad of American aircraft as well as General Patton who alighted at RAF Hixon to go to one of the Prisoner of War camps located close to Rugeley.

The airfield was host to No. 30 Operational Training Unit from its inception in June 1942 up until February 1945 when the OTU left for RAF Gamston in Nottinghamshire. At the same time that the OTU was moving out, thirty-seven Beauforts of No.12 (P)AFU from RAF Spitalgate moved in. No. 12 (P)AFU did not last long though, it was disbanded in June 1945 and the site was given over to 16 Maintenance Unit from RAF Stafford as a sub-site. 16 MU needed access to storage sites for the recently returned and surplus military items at the war's end. 16 MU stayed on until November 1957 when the base was put under the care and maintenance programme. The site was disposed of by sale in August 1962.

== Post RAF ==
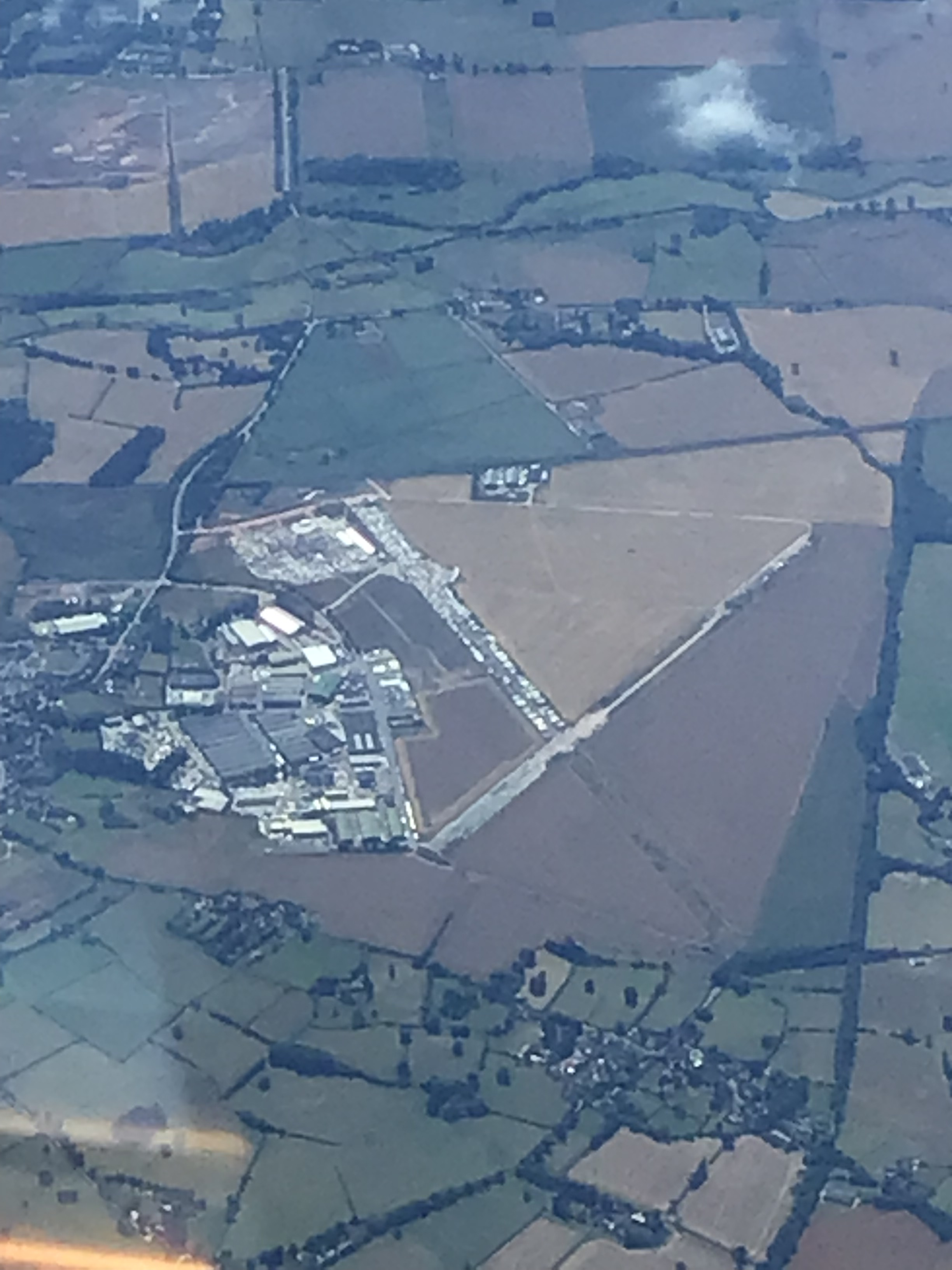
RAF Hixon (August 2022)

In 1968, a transformer built by English Electric en route to Hixon airfield was involved in a crash with a train on a level crossing on the Manchester branch of the West Coast Main Line. English Electric were using the former airfield hangars to store the transformers with at least six others having been successfully transported and stored there.

Two of the runways still exist and although they are heavily overgrown, Staffordshire Police use them for driver training. The former technical site is now occupied by an industrial estate which lets out space for companies as well as permanent occupancy buildings.

The control tower is still extant and has been converted for office and private use. A white building on the front of Hixon Industrial Estate was the medical centre and still has part of the mortuary in situ.
