= RAF Church Broughton =

RAF airbase in England, UK

RAF Church Broughton
- Near Church Broughton, Derbyshire in England
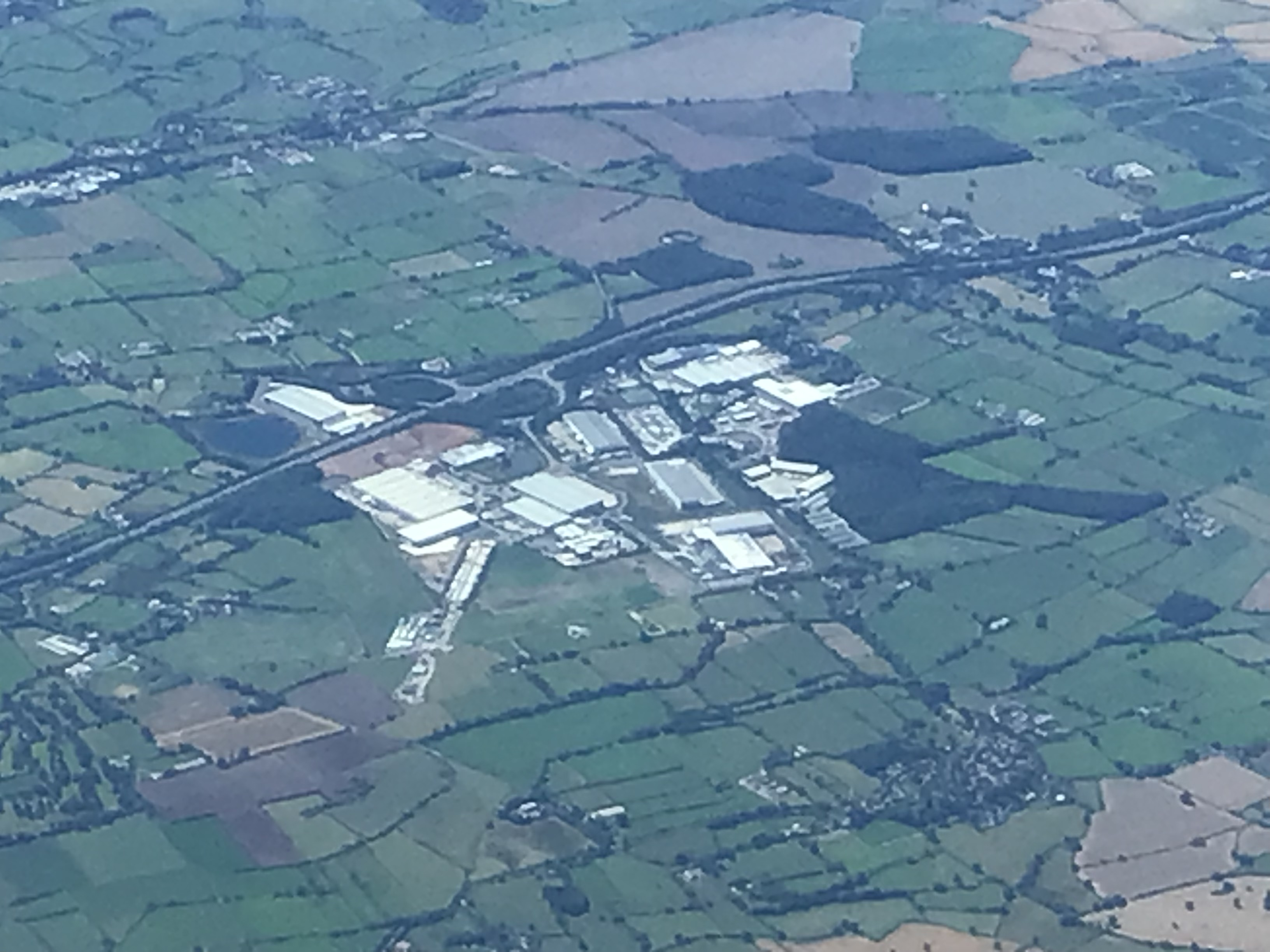
- RAF Church Broughton (2024)

Site information
- Type: Royal Air Force satellite station
- Code: CB
- Owner: Air Ministry
- Operator: Royal Air Force
- Controlled by: RAF Bomber Command * No. 93 (OTU) Group RAF

Location
- Shown within Derbyshire RAF Church Broughton (the United Kingdom)
- Coordinates: 52°53′07″N 001°41′59″W

Site history
- Built: 1941/2
- In use: August 1942 - June 1945
- Battles/wars: European theatre of World War II

Airfield information
- Elevation: 69 metres (226 ft) AMSL
Runways
Direction	Length and surface
05/23	1,550 metres (5,085 ft) Concrete
00/00	Concrete/Tarmac
18/36	1,200 metres (3,937 ft) Concrete

Royal Air Force Church Broughton or more simply RAF Church Broughton is a former Royal Air Force satellite station located near Church Broughton, Derbyshire, England.

== History ==
The following units were here at some point:

- Satellite of No. 27 Operational Training Unit RAF (August 1942 - May 1945)
- Sub site for No. 51 Maintenance Unit RAF (August 1945 - ?)
- No. 93 Group Screened Pilots School RAF formed here during May 1943 operating Vickers Wellington IIIs. The unit was disbanded at RAF Leicester East during October 1944.
- No. 1429 (Czechoslovak Operational Training) Flight RAF using Wellington IIIs and Westland Lysander IIs between August and November 1942. The unit was disbanded on 27 February 1943 while at RAF Thornaby to become Czechoslovak Flight with No. 6 OTU

== Current use ==
A large part of the site is now occupied by Dove Valley Park, a 200 acre employment park with a variety of businesses.

== See also ==
- List of former Royal Air Force stations
