= Ackerley =

Ackerley is a surname. Notable people with the surname include:

- Alvin Ackerley (1927–1973), English rugby league footballer
- Barry Ackerley (1934–2011), American media and sports owner
- David Ackerly (born 1960), Australian footballer
- Ernie Ackerley (1943–2017), English footballer
- Frederick Ackerley (1871–1954), British Anglican priest
- George Ackerley (1887–1958), English footballer
- J. Christopher Ackerley, American politician
- J. R. Ackerley (1896–1967), English writer and editor
- Michelle Ackerley (born 1984), English television presenter
- Paul Ackerley (1949–2011), New Zealand field hockey player
- Stan Ackerley (born 1942), English–Australian association footballer

== See also ==
- Ackerley Group, an American media company owned by Barry Ackerley
- Ackerley Prize, previously J. R. Ackerley Prize for Autobiography, a British prize awarded by PEN
