= Desmond Arthur =

Irish aviator (1884–1913)

Desmond Lucius Studdert P. P. Arthur
- Born: 31 March 1884; O'Brien's Bridge, County Clare, Ireland
- Died: 27 May 1913 (aged 29); Lunan Bay near Montrose, Angus, Scotland
- Burial place: Sleepyhillock Cemetery, Montrose, Angus, Scotland
- Military career
- Allegiance: United Kingdom
- Branch: Army Motor Reserve; Royal Munster Fusiliers; Royal Flying Corps
- Service years: c. 1908 – 1913
- Rank: Lieutenant
- Units: Royal Munster Fusiliers; No. 2 Squadron RFC

Lieutenant Desmond Arthur (1884–1913) was an Irish aviator in No. 2 Squadron of the Royal Flying Corps. Following his death in Scotland's first fatal aircraft accident; a government inquiry was launched to investigate the circumstances surrounding the crash. The first inquiry found him responsible, but a later investigation exonerated Arthur. Arthur's ghost is claimed to haunt the RAF Montrose airfield in Montrose, Angus, Scotland, and paranormal enthusiasts consider it to be one of the most well-known ghost stories of the First World War. Desmond Arthur was the first Irishman to be killed in an aircraft accident.

== Early life ==
Lieutenant Desmond Lucius Studdert P. P. Arthur was born on 31 March 1884 at O'Brien's Bridge in County Clare, Ireland. The son of Thomas F. Arthur and Helen Studdert, he came from a prominent Clare family and had a sister, and a brother: Captain Charles William Augustus Arthur. Arthur was educated at Portora Royal School, Enniskillen. He was an enthusiastic sportsman and won a number of prizes in motoring speed trials, before becoming Lieutenant in the Army Motor Reserve in 1908. Arthur attended the first Irish Aviation Meeting at Leopardstown Racecourse on 29 August 1910. It was there that he was introduced to Cecil Grace, which reinforced his desire to become a pilot. Arthur joined the 5th Battalion Royal Munster Fusiliers (Special Reserve) and was promoted to Lieutenant on 27 May 1911. He was known for his adventurous nature, as well as his "unassuming manner and unfailing good spirit".

== Flying career ==
On 18 June 1912 Arthur gained his Royal Aero Club certificate No.233 after completing his trials flying a Bristol Prier monoplane at Brooklands. He joined No. 2 Squadron of the Royal Flying Corps on 17 April 1913, based at Montrose. In 1913, Montrose Airfield was built as an operational base for the training of pilots for the Royal Flying Corps, the first of its kind in Britain. The flying training school, like many others, experienced frequent crashes as it built up a force of skilled pilots through the First and Second World Wars. At around 7:30am on Tuesday 27 May 1913 Arthur's B.E.2 biplane No.205 collapsed without warning while flying over Montrose during a routine training flight from Upper Dysart to Lunan Bay. Arthur had begun to descend when, at 2,500 feet (760 m), the right wing of the aircraft snapped off and it plunged to the ground. Arthur was thrown from the aircraft and died instantly. He was found 160 yards (150 m) away from his machine. Arthur's death in an accident was one of the first to occur in the Royal Flying Corps, and the first at Montrose. He was buried in Sleepyhillock Cemetery, Montrose.

Contemporaries were surprised by the crash of an experienced pilot. A report issued by the Accidents and Investigation Committee of the Royal Aero Club on 21 June 1913 found that the accident had occurred because of the incompetent repair of a broken spar by an unknown mechanic. It was believed that the damage to the aircraft had been accidental, and shoddily repaired to prevent detection prior to the aircraft being transferred from Farnborough to Montrose. A government inquiry opened on 11 July 1913. In 1914 M.P. William Joynson-Hicks complained of a "whitewash" and that the Secretary of State for War Colonel Seely would not admit to the faulty repair. In the spring of 1916 Noel Pemberton Billing called for a judicial enquiry into the military and naval air service, as "certain officers had been murdered rather than killed by the carelessness, incompetence or ignorance of their senior officers or of the technical side of those two services". An official investigation by a government committee set up on 3 August 1916 concluded that the pilot was at fault, and the crash a result of dangerous flying.

== Ghost stories ==
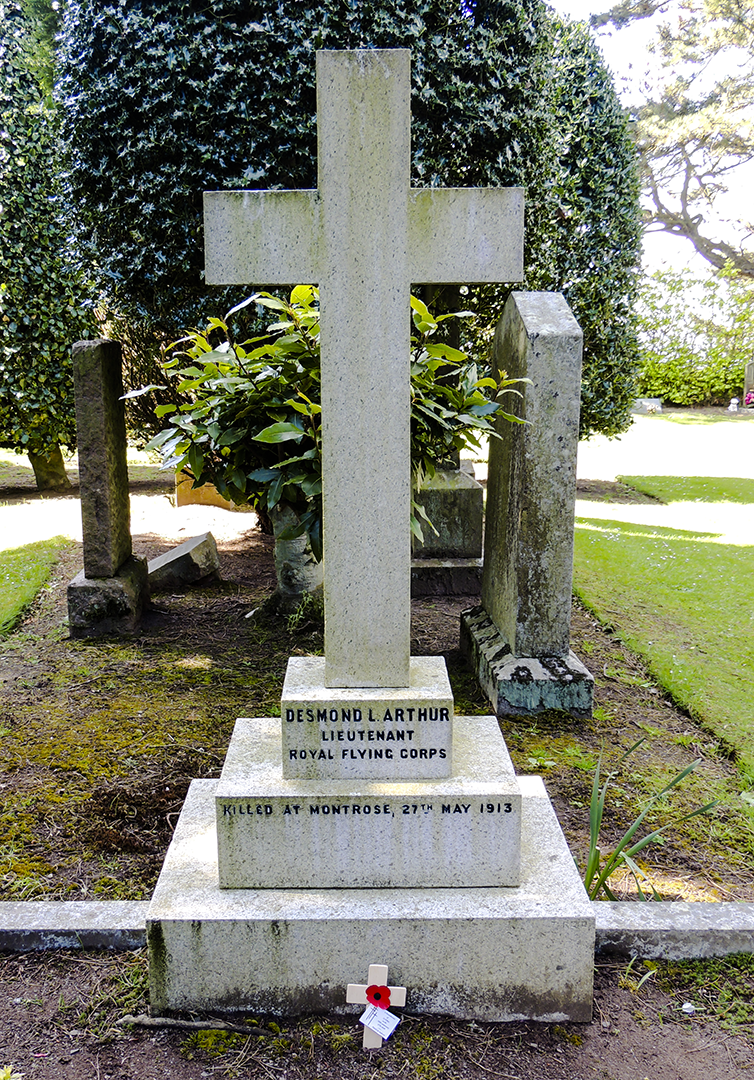
Grave of Desmond Arthur at Sleepyhillock Cemetery, Montrose, Angus, Scotland.

On 1 January 1914, the squadron moved from Upper Dysart to Broomfield Farm. Shortly after the government report was published in Autumn 1916, it is claimed that Major Cyril Foggin saw a ghostly figure enter the officers' mess but did not report it, fearing he would lose his post. According to paranormal enthusiasts, there were further sightings by other officers and flight instructors, all occurring in what was the old mess of the No. 2 Flying Squadron, and the ghost became known as the 'Irish Apparition' or the 'Montrose Ghost'. Believers say fear of the ghost caused guards to desert their posts and pilots to request transfer from Montrose. The ghost was named as Desmond Arthur by the editor of British flying magazine The Aeroplane, C. G. Grey. Grey, who was a personal friend of Desmond Arthur, believed that the appearance of his ghost was linked with the official investigation into the crash. A later investigative report, published at the end of 1916, reinstated the reputation of Arthur, finding that the crash was due to a damaged wing.

According to legend, in 1940, a Hurricane pilot was distracted by a "mysterious biplane" whilst searching for a Heinkel bomber. Another legend claims that in 1942, an unidentified flight lieutenant stationed at Montrose crashed into the runway not long after takeoff, and was killed instantly. A week before the crash, he had quarrelled with the mechanic working on his plane. The mechanic became subject to an Inquiry but after little evidence of tampering, the charges were dropped. It is claimed that shortly after the crash, there were reports of a ghost appearing at the airfield wearing a flying suit and goggles. According to believers, the ghost was known to be encountered along the flight line, emerging from the fog. There are also claims that in 1949, when Montrose had become a permanent training station, new cadets were supposedly briefed on the ghost.

It is claimed that Sir Peter Masefield saw what he believed was a 70-horsepower B.E.2 biplane with a pilot wearing a leather flying helmet, goggles and scarf while flying his Chipmunk close to Montrose while en route from Dalcross to Shoreham on 27 May 1963. According to legend, Masefield landed after he believed he had seen the other plane crashing, but on reaching the ground discovered that there was no plane or crash site.
