= No. 8 Flying Training School RAF =

Former Royal Air Force flying training school

No. 8 Flying Training School
- Active: 1 Jan 1936 - 25 Mar 1942; 1 May 1951 - 1 Dec 1953; 1 Jun 1954 – 19 Mar 1964
- Country: United Kingdom
- Branch: Royal Air Force
- Role: Military Pilot training

No. 8 Flying Training School (8 FTS) is a former Royal Air Force flying training school that operated between 1936 and 1964.

== History ==
=== First formation ===
- 1 Jan 1936 – 25 Mar 1942

8 FTS at RAF Montrose became 8 SFTS on 3 September 1939 and was disbanded on 25 March 1942 at RAF Montrose and absorbed by No. 2 Flying Instructors School RAF.

==== History of 2 FIS ====
2 FIS was initially formed at RAF Cranwell but was disbanded only after two months. It then reformed at RAF Montrose on 5 January 1942 being redesignated No. 2 Flying Instructors School (Advanced) RAF on 7 April 1942, disbanding still at Montrose on 11 July 1945.

=== Second formation ===
- 1 May 1951 – 1 Dec 1953

Reformed at RAF Dalcross as 8 FTS became No. 8 (Advanced) Flying Training School RAF from 1 June 1951 then disbanded two years later still at Dalcross.

=== Third formation ===
- 1 Jun 1954 – 19 Mar 1964

Reformed at RAF Driffield as 8 FTS by redesignating No. 203 Advanced Flying School RAF then was disbanded at RAF Swinderby.

==== History of 203 AFS ====
203 AFS was formed at RAF Keevil on 1 July 1947 by redesignating No. 61 OTU. It was disbanded to become No. 226 Operational Conversion Unit RAF at RAF Stradishall but reformed at RAF Driffield one day later. It was finally disbanded on 1 June 1954 still at Driffield.
