= George Ackerley =

English footballer (1887–1958)

Personal information
- Date of birth: 21 May 1887
- Place of birth: West Derby, Liverpool, England
- Date of death: 1958 (aged 70–71)
- Position: Inside left

Senior career*
| Years | Team | Apps | (Gls) |
| 1908 | Liverpool | 0 | (0) |
| 1909 | Leeds City | 2 | (0) |
- * Club domestic league appearances and goals

George Ackerley (1887–1958) was an English footballer who played in the Football League for Liverpool and Leeds City.
