= No. 16 (Polish) Flying Training School RAF =

Coordinates: 53°00′53″N 1°13′04″W

- Active: 1940-1946
- Country: United Kingdom
- Branch: Royal Air Force
- Role: Pilot training

No. 16 (Polish) Flying Training School RAF (16 (P) FTS) is a former Royal Air Force flying training school that operated between 1940 and 1946.

== History ==
The flying training school began life as the Polish Training and Grading Flight was which formed on 14 February 1940 at Redhill and operated Fairey Battles and Miles Magisters until 28 November 1940 when it was disbanded at Hucknall to become 1 (Polish) Flying Training School which also flew Airspeed Oxfords and de Havilland Tiger Moths until 9 June 1941 when the unit was disbanded and became No. 16 (Polish) Flying Training School and No. 25 (Polish) Elementary Flying Training School.

No. 16 (Polish) Flying Training School began life as No. 16 Service Flying Training School at Hucknall on 9 June 1941 and flew Hawker Hinds, de Havilland Moth Minors, de Havilland Gipsy Moths, Bristol Blenheims, Avro Ansons and North American Harvards until being renamed on 1 November 1945. The school was disbanded on 18 December 1946 at Newton.
