= RAF Cranage =

Former RAF base in Cheshire, England

RAF Cranage
- Near Middlewich, Cheshire in England
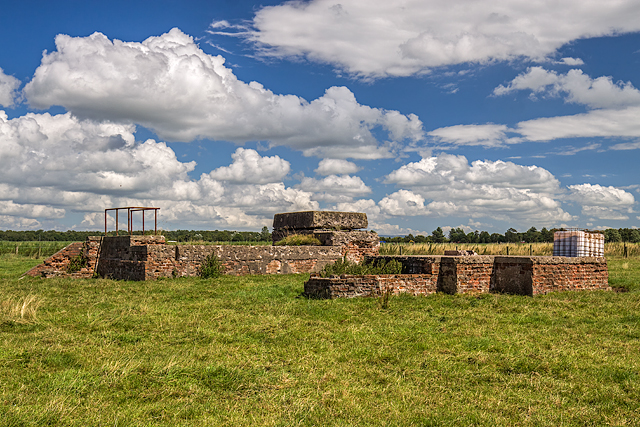
- Disused buildings on the former airfield (2017)

Site information
- Type: Royal Air Force satellite station
- Code: RG
- Owner: Air Ministry
- Operator: Royal Air Force
- Controlled by: RAF Flying Training Command; 1940, 1941- RAF Fighter Command 1940-41 * No. 9 Group RAF

Location
- Shown within Cheshire RAF Cranage (the United Kingdom)
- Coordinates: 53°13′16″N 2°24′05″W

Site history
- Built: 1939/40
- In use: October 1940 - June 1954
- Battles/wars: European theatre of World War II

Airfield information
- Identifiers: WMO: grid reference SJ733694
- Elevation: 50 metres (164 ft) AMSL
Runways
| Direction | Length and surface |
|---|---|
| 00/00 | Sommerfeld Tracking |
| 00/00 | Sommerfeld Tracking |
| 00/00 | Sommerfeld Tracking |

Royal Air Force Cranage or more simply RAF Cranage is a former Royal Air Force satellite station operated during the Second World War. It was located just to the North of Middlewich, Cheshire, England.

== History ==
The site at Cranage was chosen for use as a training station and aircraft maintenance unit in August 1939. Originally just a grass airfield, three runways were later built from American metal plank. The airfield unusually had eight blister hangars for maintenance use.

The first flying unit was No. 2 School of Air Navigation which was formed on 21 October 1940. It operated the twin-engined Avro Anson for training navigators. In 1942 the unit was renamed the Central Navigation School and the strength was increased to 58 Ansons, they were joined two years later by a number of Vickers Wellingtons in the same role.

As well as the training role, the airfield also housed an operational squadron from December 1940 with the formation of 96 Squadron which was equipped with Hawker Hurricanes. This unit operated in the night air-defence role, mainly in the protection of the industrial and port areas of Liverpool.

A Vickers-Armstrongs shadow factory assembling Wellingtons, was situated at Byley but close to the airfield. The completed aircraft would be towed from the factory to the airfield for their first flight and onward delivery. In July 1942 1531 Flight was formed as a Beam Approach Training Flight using the Airspeed Oxford. Aircrew were taught the techniques of the-then new airfield approach aid. A United States Army Air Forces liaison flight, operating Stinson L-5 Sentinels, also worked from the site in 1944.

The only flying unit on the airfield after the war was No. 190 Gliding School which was formed in May 1945 and operated from the site for two years. With their departure, flying ceased at Cranage. The airfield was used for storage and maintenance until it closed in 1958.

== RAF units and aircraft ==
| Unit | Dates | Aircraft | Variant | Notes |
|---|---|---|---|---|
| No. 96 Squadron RAF | 1940-1941 | Hawker Hurricane | I | Night-fighter. |
| No. 96 Squadron RAF | 1940-1941 | Boulton Paul Defiant | I | |
| No. 307 Polish Night Fighter Squadron | 1940-1941 | Boulton Paul Defiant | I | Detachment from RAF Jurby. |
| No. 2 School of Air Navigation RAF | 1940-1942 | Avro Anson | | Renamed the Central Navigation School |
| Central Navigation School RAF | 1942-1944 | Avro Anson; Vickers Wellington | | |
| No. 1531 (Beam Approach Training) Flight RAF | 1942-1945 | Airspeed Oxford | | |
| Sub site for No. 61 Maintenance Unit RAF | 1945-1954 | None | | |

The following units were also here at some point:

- No. 4 Air Crew Holding Unit (June 1945 - August 1946)
- Relief Landing Ground for No. 5 Service Flying Training School RAF (August 1940)
- Relief Landing Ground for No. 11 (Pilots) Advanced Flying Unit RAF (April 1944 - February 1945)
- Relief Landing Ground for No. 11 Service Flying Training School RAF (September - October 1941)
- Detachment of No. 12 (Pilots) Advanced Flying Unit RAF (February 1945)
- No. 20 Personnel Transit Centre (April 1947 - December 1954)
- No. 90 Initial Training Wing (FE) (May - October 1944)
- No. 422 (Fighter Interception) Flight RAF (December 1940)
- No. 2778 Squadron RAF Regiment
- No. 2787 Squadron RAF Regiment

== United States Army Air Forces units and aircraft ==
| Unit | Dates | Aircraft | Notes |
|---|---|---|---|
| No. 14 Liaison Squadron | 1944- | Stinson L-5 Sentinel | |

== Post RAF use ==
Since the closure of the station, the M6 has been built and it cuts through the former north east corner of the airfield. The Air Defences around the site are well preserved and were listed in 2002.

=== Holford Gas Storage ===
In 2000, Scottish Power unveiled plans to store gas in the former salt brine caverns underneath the site. Despite appeals, this was granted in 2004 and work started soon after. Work progressed slowly due to the appeals process and also due to Scottish Power selling the concern to E.ON UK. The caverns were first supplied with gas for storage in 2011, with full capacity reached in 2013.

The caverns can store up to 6 billion cubic feet of gas.

== See also ==
- List of scheduled monuments in Cheshire since 1539
