= RAF Lichfield =

Airport in Fradley, Staffordshire, England

RAF Lichfield
- Fradley, Staffordshire in England
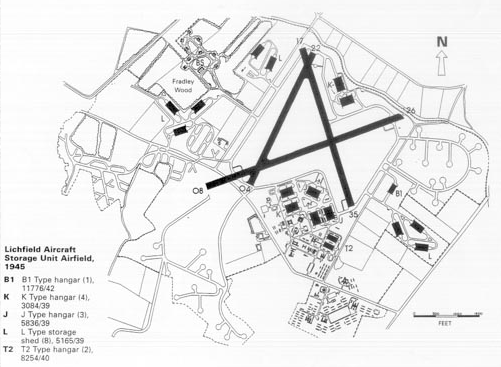
- Plan of RAF Lichfield in 1945

Site information
- Type: Royal Air Force station parent station 1941-46
- Code: LF
- Owner: Air Ministry
- Operator: Royal Air Force
- Controlled by: RAF Maintenance Command; RAF Bomber Command * No. 6 (T) Group RAF * No. 91 (OTU) Group RAF * No. 93 (OTU) Group RAF

Location
- Shown within Staffordshire RAF Lichfield (the United Kingdom)
- Coordinates: 52°42′46″N 001°46′58″W

Site history
- Built: 1940
- In use: 1 August 1940 - April 1958
- Battles/wars: European theatre of World War II

Airfield information
- Elevation: 67 metres (220 ft) AMSL
Runways
Direction	Length and surface
00/00	Tarmac
00/00	Tarmac
00/00	Tarmac

Royal Air Force Lichfield or more simply RAF Lichfield is a former Royal Air Force station located in Fradley, 2 miles (3.2 km) north east of Lichfield, Staffordshire, England. The airfield was the busiest airfield in Staffordshire during the Second World War. The airfield supported its own units as well as providing safe haven for many more. It was a control point for all aviation traffic that passed through the Birmingham area during the war and saw more aircraft movements than any other Staffordshire airfield.

It also known as Fradley Aerodrome.

== History ==
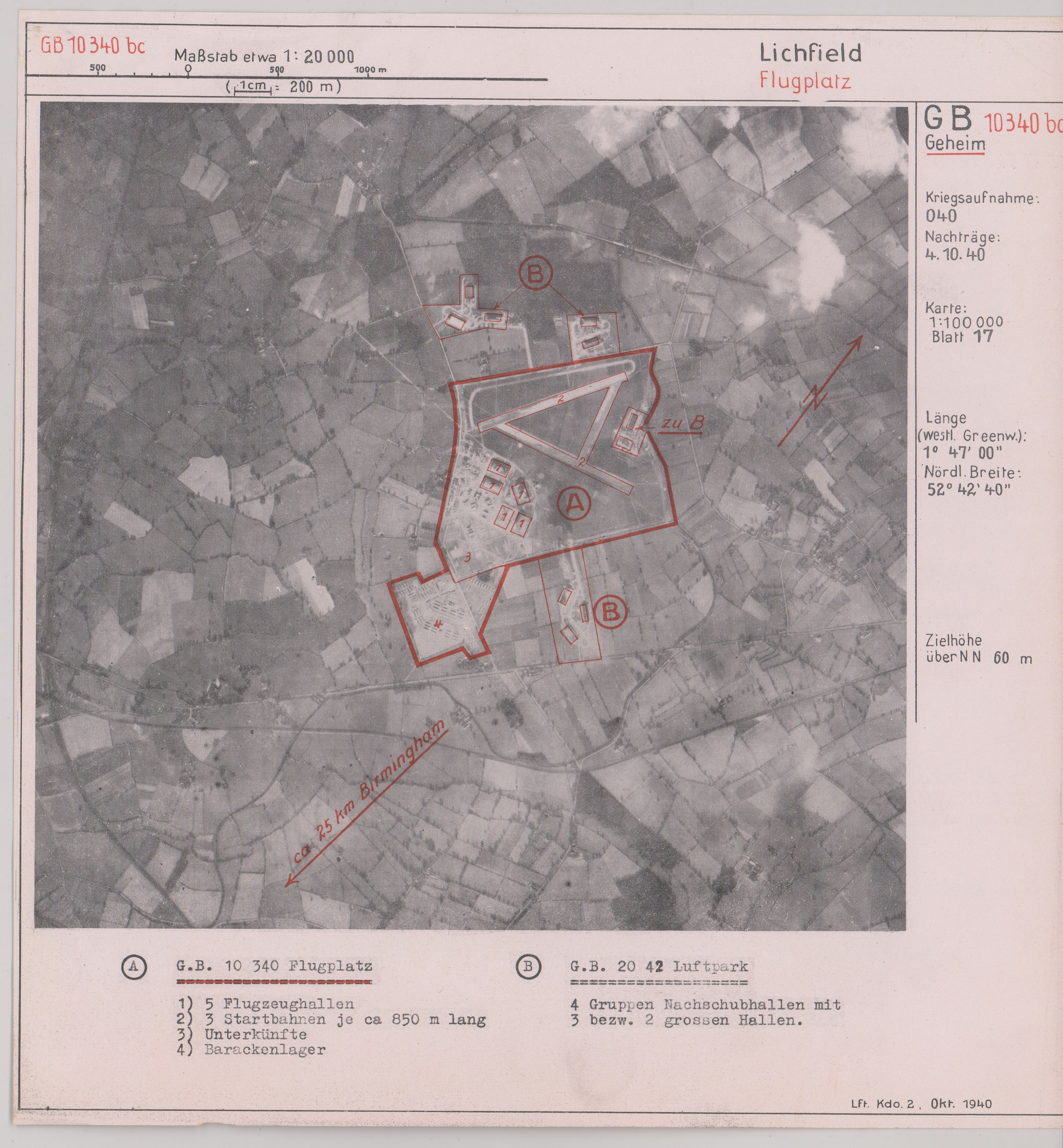
RAF Lichfield on a target dossier of the German Luftwaffe, 1940

RAF Lichfield, known locally as Fradley Aerodrome, was constructed from mid 1939 to 1940. The airfield was set out in the usual triangular pattern with two runways 1 km in length and a main runway of 1.46 km. Initially it operated as a maintenance site, being home to the No. 51 Maintenance Unit from August 1940. Manufacturers sent newly built aircraft to Fradley to carry out any modifications before delivery to squadrons. After the war, large numbers of aircraft were broken up and many aircraft were prepared before being sold to the air forces of other countries. The unit remained active until the closure of the airfield in 1958.

27 OTU (Operational Training Unit) was formed on 23 April 1941; its role was to form and train aircrew for front line bombing operations using Vickers Wellington bombers. The crews, largely from Australia and other Commonwealth countries, were then posted to their allocated squadrons, mostly in Lincolnshire.

Operational bombing missions were flown from Lichfield in 1942–43, including the 1,000-bomber raid on Cologne in May 1942. After 1943 most sorties were 'Nickel' raids, the dropping of propaganda leaflets over German cities coupled with occasional bombing of French airfields occupied by German Forces. The unit was disbanded in June 1945 with the last flying training detail being flown on 22 June.

After the war the airfield continued to be occupied by No. 51 Maintenance Unit preparing aircraft for service with foreign air forces and civilian use. The unit also began breaking up surplus WW2 aircraft including Wellingtons, de Havilland Mosquitoes and 900 Hawker Typhoons. The unit eventually became surplus to requirements and disbanded in July 1954. In its final years No. 99 Maintenance Unit, 5003 Airfield Construction Squadron and the Maintenance Command Ground Defence School used the airfield. Two RAF gliding squadrons also flew from Lichfield (43 & 48) until 1955. The airfield was closed in 1958 and the entire site was disposed of by Winterton's on behalf of the Air Ministry in May 1962 for £240,000.

== Fradley Park ==
Over the last 15 years the former aerodrome has been renamed Fradley Park, where a number of major developments have occurred, including industrial units and over 750 new homes. However, virtually all the hangars still exist and the majority have been refurbished to be used for industrial purposes.
