= RAF Seighford =

Satellite station located northwest of Stafford, Staffordshire, England

RAF Seighford
- Seighford, Staffordshire
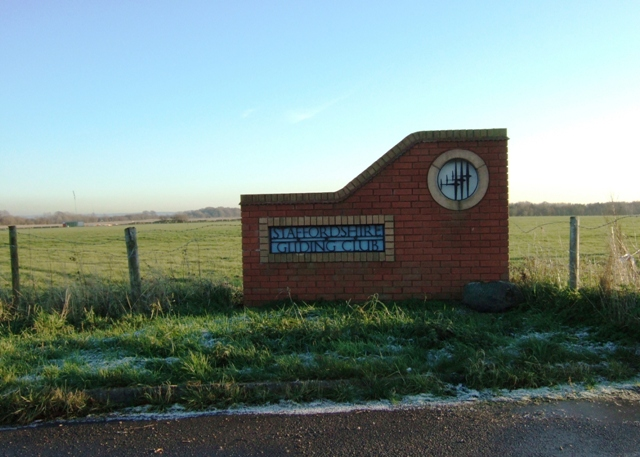
- The entrance to Staffordshire Gliding Club, looking south from the B5405 road. The green building on the left is where what is left of the main runway is located.

Site information
- Type: Royal Air Force satellite station
- Code: YD
- Owner: Air Ministry; Ministry of Defence; Boulton Paul; Staffordshire Gliding Club

Location
- Coordinates: 52°50′11″N 02°00′32″W

Site history
- Built: 1942-1943
- In use: 1942-1946; 1956-1966; 1992-present day

Airfield information
Runways
Direction	Length and surface
00/00	2,000 yd (1,800 m) Concrete
00/00	1,400 yd (1,300 m) Concrete
00/00	1,400 yd (1,300 m) Concrete

Royal Air Force Seighford or more simply RAF Seighford is a former Royal Air Force satellite station located 3.6 miles (5.8 km) northwest of Stafford, Staffordshire, England. The site was opened as a satellite/relief landing ground for RAF Hixon, 7.5 miles (12.1 km) to the east.

From 1956 until 1965, the airfield and associated buildings were used by the Boulton Paul Aircraft Company as a testing area for overhauled aircraft.

== History ==
Royal Air Force

Only three units were located at RAF Seighford in its Air Force history and two of those (21 (P)AFU and 30 OTU) were satellite flights of the main units which were based out of RAF Hixon.

- No. 21 (Pilots) Advanced Flying Unit RAF
- No. 23 Heavy Glider Conversion Unit
- No. 30 Operational Training Unit RAF

The main site was ready by 1942, but aircraft operations did not commence until January 1943 when No. 25 OTU at RAF Finningley was disbanded and its aircraft were sent to Hixon and Seighford.

The two main hangars at Seighford were built adjacent to the airfield but across the B5405 road, which ran along the northern edge of the runways. This necessitated closing the road to transport aircraft between the hangars and the runways. This procedure carried on into the Boulton Paul era too.

Military flying ceased at Seighford in 1946, with the site abandoned by the Air Ministry in 1947.

Boulton Paul Aircraft Company

The Boulton Paul Aircraft Company took over the site in 1956. The company needed a place to test larger and heavier aircraft than their existing airfield at Wolverhampton (Pendeford). Although that airfield was adjacent to their factory, it was not long enough for testing in the Jet Age and so an option was taken on the former RAF Seighford site. Boulton Paul extended the main runway by another 200 yards (180 m) to become 2,000 yards (1,800 m).

Working as a sub-contractor for English Electric, Boulton Paul overhauled Canberras, Lightnings and Viscounts at Seighford. When the TSR2 programme was cancelled, their parent – British Aircraft Company (BAC) – did not have enough work on its books to sustain their own sites at Warton and Samlesbury in addition to tasks sub-contracted to Boulton Paul. As a result, the site at Seighford was closed in January 1966 and returned largely to agricultural use.

== Current use ==
Most of the site is currently leased by the Staffordshire Gliding Club who moved to Seighford in 1992. The main runway is grass NE/SW and 1000 metres long. The club has a membership of 100 and a fleet of three two-seater training gliders and two single-seaters for qualified solo pilots. The one remaining tarmac runway to the South is used by a driving experience company. The old control tower is still standing as are a number of wartime buildings which were used for many years by displaced Polish refugee families.
