= No. 14 (Advanced) Flying Training School RAF =

Former Royal Air Force flying training school

No. 14 (Advanced) Flying Training School
- Active: 1 April 1939 - 26 January 1942; 3 March 1952 – 31 January 1953
- Country: United Kingdom
- Branch: Royal Air Force
- Role: Military Pilot training

No. 14 (Advanced) Flying Training School (14 (A)FTS) is a former Royal Air Force flying training school that operated between 1939 and 1953.
