= No. 91 Group RAF =

Former Royal Air Force operations group

No. 91 Group RAF No. 91 (Operational Training) Group No. 91 (Bomber OTU) Group
- Royal Air Force Ensign
- Active: 11 May 1942 - 1 May 1947
- Country: United Kingdom
- Branch: Royal Air Force
- Type: Royal Air Force group
- Role: Controlled Bomber OTU's
- Part of: RAF Bomber Command
- Last base: Morton Hall, Swinderby

No. 91 Group RAF is a former Royal Air Force group.

The group was formed on 11 May 1942, at Abingdon as No. 91 (Operational Training) Group RAF in RAF Bomber Command, it was previously No. 6 Group RAF. Within a matter of weeks it was called upon to provide over 200 aircraft and crews for Operation Millenium, the first 1,000 bomber raid, launched against Cologne on the night of 30/31 May 1942.

On 14 April 1947, the Group moved to Morton Hall, Swinderby and was amalgamated with and renamed No. 21 Group RAF on 1 May 1947.

== Structure ==
- February 1943 - HQ at Abingdon
  - No. 10 Operational Training Unit RAF at RAF Abingdon / RAF Stanton Harcourt with the Armstrong Whitworth Whitley V
  - No. 15 Operational Training Unit RAF at RAF Harwell / RAF Hampstead Norris with the Vickers Wellington Ic
  - No. 19 Operational Training Unit RAF at RAF Kinloss / RAF Forres with the Armstrong Whitworth Whitley V
  - No. 20 Operational Training Unit RAF at RAF Lossiemouth / RAF Elgin with the Vickers Wellington I
  - No. 21 Operational Training Unit RAF at RAF Moreton-in-Marsh / RAF Edgehill with the Vickers Wellington I
  - No. 22 Operational Training Unit RAF at RAF Wellesbourne Mountford / RAF Gaydon with the Vickers Wellington I, III
  - No. 23 Operational Training Unit RAF at RAF Pershore / RAF Stratford with the Vickers Wellington I
  - No. 24 Operational Training Unit RAF at RAF Honeybourne / RAF Long Marston with the Armstrong Whitworth Whitley V
- February 1944 - HQ at Abingdon
  - No. 10 Operational Training Unit RAF at RAF Abingdon / RAF Stanton Harcourt with the Armstrong Whitworth Whitley V, VII
  - No. 15 Operational Training Unit RAF at RAF Harwell / RAF Hampstead Norris with the Vickers Wellington III, X
  - No. 19 Operational Training Unit RAF at RAF Kinloss / RAF Forres with the Vickers Wellington III, X
  - No. 20 Operational Training Unit RAF at RAF Lossiemouth / RAF Elgin with the Vickers Wellington III, X
  - No. 21 Operational Training Unit RAF at RAF Moreton-in-Marsh / RAF Enstone with the Vickers Wellington III, X
  - No. 22 Operational Training Unit RAF at RAF Wellesbourne Mountford / RAF Gaydon with the Vickers Wellington III, X
  - No. 23 Operational Training Unit RAF at RAF Pershore / RAF Stratford with the Vickers Wellington III, X
  - No. 24 Operational Training Unit RAF at RAF Honeybourne / RAF Long Marston with the Vickers Wellington III, X
- February 1945 - HQ at Abingdon
  - No. 10 Operational Training Unit RAF at RAF Abingdon with the Vickers Wellington X
  - No. 19 Operational Training Unit RAF at RAF Kinloss with the Vickers Wellington X
  - No. 20 Operational Training Unit RAF at RAF Lossiemouth /RAF Elgin with the Vickers Wellington X
  - No. 21 Operational Training Unit RAF at RAF Moreton-in-Marsh / RAF Enstone with the Vickers Wellington X
  - No. 22 Operational Training Unit RAF at RAF Wellesbourne Mountford / RAF Gaydon with the Vickers Wellington III, X
  - No. 24 Operational Training Unit RAF at RAF Honeybourne / RAF Long Marston with the Vickers Wellington X
  - No. 27 Operational Training Unit RAF at RAF Lichfield / RAF Church Broughton with the Vickers Wellington X
  - No. 30 Operational Training Unit RAF at RAF Gamston / RAF Hixon with the Vickers Wellington III, X
