= Military history of Scotland =

Aspect of Scottish history

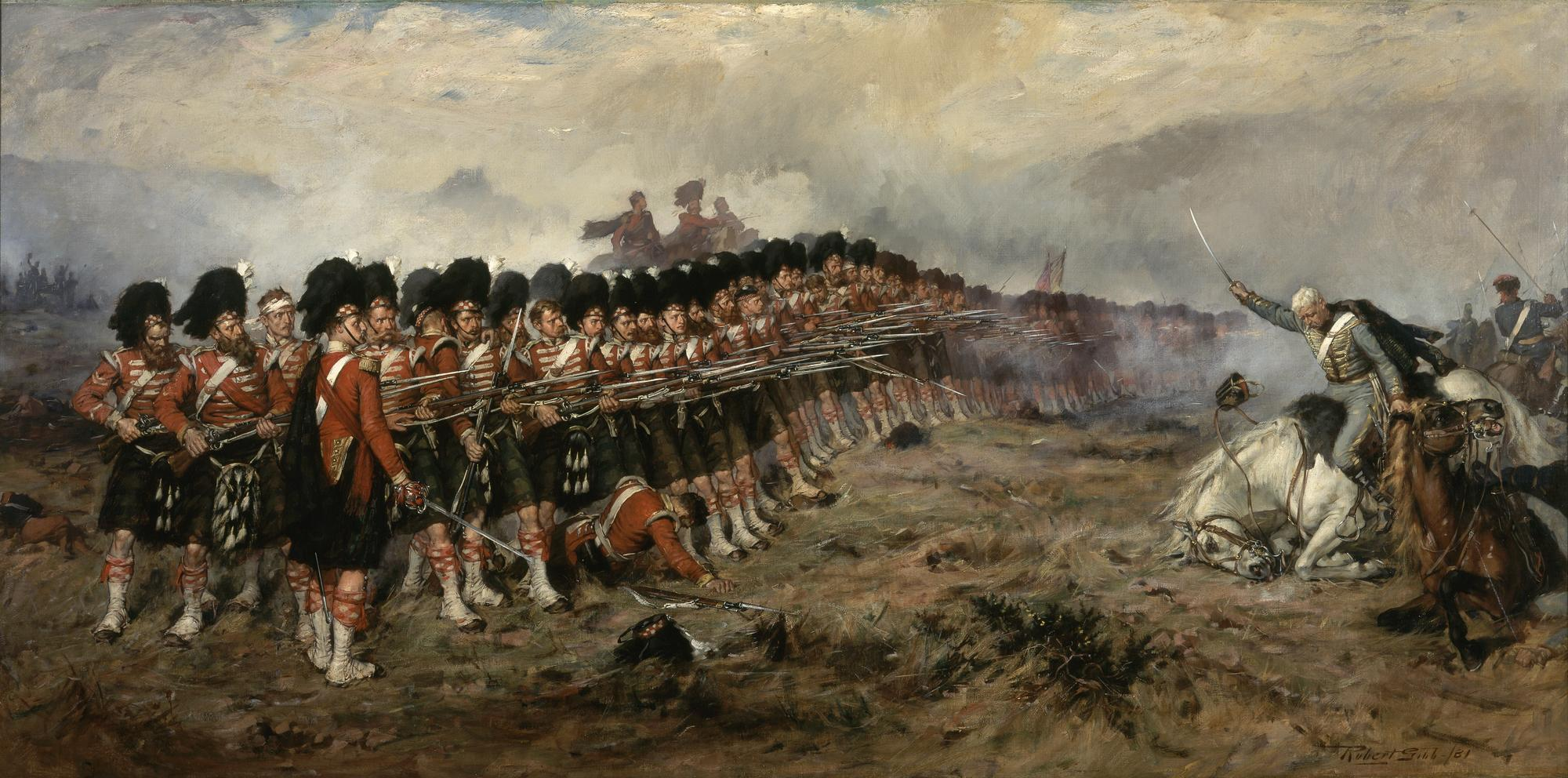
The Thin Red Line of 1854, by Robert Gibb, in his 1881 painting

Historically, Scotland has a long military tradition that predates the Act of Union with England in 1707. Its soldiers today form part of the armed forces of the United Kingdom, more usually referred to domestically within the UK as the British Armed Forces.

== History prior to the Union ==
=== Royal Scots Navy ===
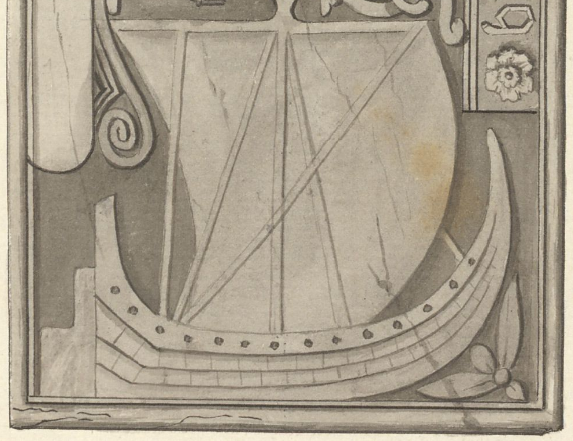
A carving of a birlinn from a sixteenth-century tombstone in MacDufie's Chapel, Oronsay, as engraved in 1772

There are mentions in Medieval records of fleets commanded by Scottish kings including William the Lion and Alexander II. The latter took personal command of a large naval force which sailed from the Firth of Clyde and anchored off the island of Kerrera in 1249, intended to transport his army in a campaign against the Kingdom of the Isles, but he died before the campaign could begin. Viking naval power was disrupted by conflicts between the Scandinavian kingdoms, but entered a period of resurgence in the thirteenth century when Norwegian kings began to build some of the largest ships seen in Northern European waters. These included king Hakon Hakonsson's Kristsúðin, built at Bergen from 1262 to 1263, which was 260 feet (79 m) long, of 37 rooms. In 1263 Hakon responded to Alexander III's designs on the Hebrides by personally leading a major fleet of forty vessels, including the Kristsúðin, to the islands, where they were swelled by local allies to as many as 200 ships. Records indicate that Alexander had several large oared ships built at Ayr, but he avoided a sea battle. Defeat on land at the Battle of Largs and winter storms forced the Norwegian fleet to return home, leaving the Scottish crown as the major power in the region and leading to the ceding of the Western Isles to Alexander in 1266.

English naval power was vital to Edward I's successful campaigns in Scotland from 1296, using largely merchant ships from England, Ireland and his allies in the Islands to transport and supply his armies. Part of the reason for Robert I's success was his ability to call on naval forces from the Islands. As a result of the expulsion of the Flemings from England in 1303, he gained the support of a major naval power in the North Sea. The development of naval power allowed Robert to successfully defeat English attempts to capture him in the Highlands and Islands and to blockade major English controlled fortresses at Perth and Stirling, the last forcing Edward II to attempt the relief that resulted at English defeat at Bannockburn in 1314. Scottish naval forces allowed invasions of the Isle of Man in 1313 and 1317 and Ireland in 1315. They were also crucial in the blockade of Berwick, which led to its fall in 1318.

After the establishment of Scottish independence, Robert I turned his attention to building up a Scottish naval capacity. This was largely focused on the west coast, with the Exchequer Rolls of 1326 recording the feudal duties of his vassals in that region to aid him with their vessels and crews. Towards the end of his reign he supervised the building of at least one royal man-of-war near his palace at Cardross on the River Clyde. In the late fourteenth century naval warfare with England was conducted largely by hired Scots, Flemish and French merchantmen and privateers. James I took a greater interest in naval power. After his return to Scotland in 1424, he established a shipbuilding yard at Leith, a house for marine stores, and a workshop. King's ships were built and equipped there to be used for trade as well as war, one of which accompanied him on his expedition to the Islands in 1429. The office of Lord High Admiral was probably founded in this period. In his struggles with his nobles in 1488 James III received assistance from his two warships the Flower and the King's Carvel also known as the Yellow Carvel.

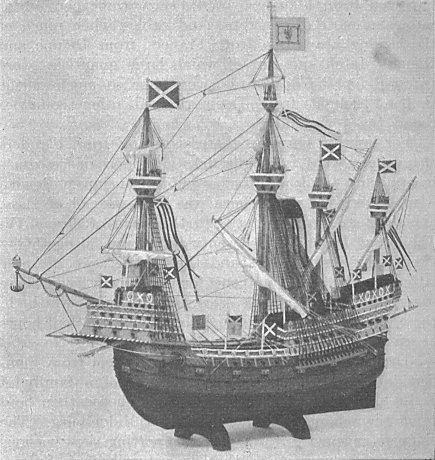
A model of the Great Michael in the Royal Museum

There were various attempts to create royal naval forces in the fifteenth century. James IV put the enterprise on a new footing, founding a harbour at Newhaven and a dockyard at the Pools of Airth. He acquired a total of 38 ships including the Great Michael, at that time, the largest ship in Europe. Scottish ships had some success against privateers, accompanied the king on his expeditions in the islands and intervened in conflicts Scandinavia and the Baltic, but were sold after the Flodden campaign and after 1516 and Scottish naval efforts would rely on privateering captains and hired merchantmen. James V did not share his father's interest in developing a navy and shipbuilding fell behind the Low Countries. Despite truces between England and Scotland there were periodic outbreaks of a guerre de course. James V built a new harbour at Burntisland in 1542. The chief use of naval power in his reign was a series of expeditions to the Isles and France. After the Union of Crowns in 1603 conflict between Scotland and England ended, but Scotland found itself involved in England's foreign policy, opening up Scottish shipping to attack. In 1626 a squadron of three ships were bought and equipped. There were also several marque fleets of privateers. In 1627, the Royal Scots Navy and accompanying contingents of burgh privateers participated in the major expedition to Biscay. The Scots also returned to West Indies and in 1629 took part in the capture of Quebec.

During the Bishop's Wars the king attempted to blockade Scotland and planned amphibious assaults from England on the East coast and from Ireland to the West. Scottish privateers took a number of English prizes. After the Covenanters allied with the English Parliament they established two patrol squadrons for the Atlantic and North Sea coasts, known collectively as the "Scotch Guard". The Scottish navy was unable to withstand the English fleet that accompanied the army led by Cromwell that conquered Scotland in 1649–51 and the Scottish ships and crews were split up among the Commonwealth fleet. Scottish seamen received protection against arbitrary impressment by English men of war, but a fixed quota of conscripts for the Royal Navy was levied from the sea-coast burghs during the second half of the seventeenth century. Royal Navy patrols were now found in Scottish waters even in peacetime. In the Second (1665–67) and Third Anglo-Dutch Wars (1672–74) between 80 and 120 captains, took Scottish letters of marque and privateers played a major part in the naval conflict. In the 1690s a small fleet of five ships was established by merchants for the Darien Scheme, and a professional navy was established for the protection of commerce in home waters during the Nine Years' War, with three purpose-built warships bought from English shipbuilders in 1696. After the Act of Union in 1707, these vessels were transferred to the Royal Navy.

=== Scottish armies ===
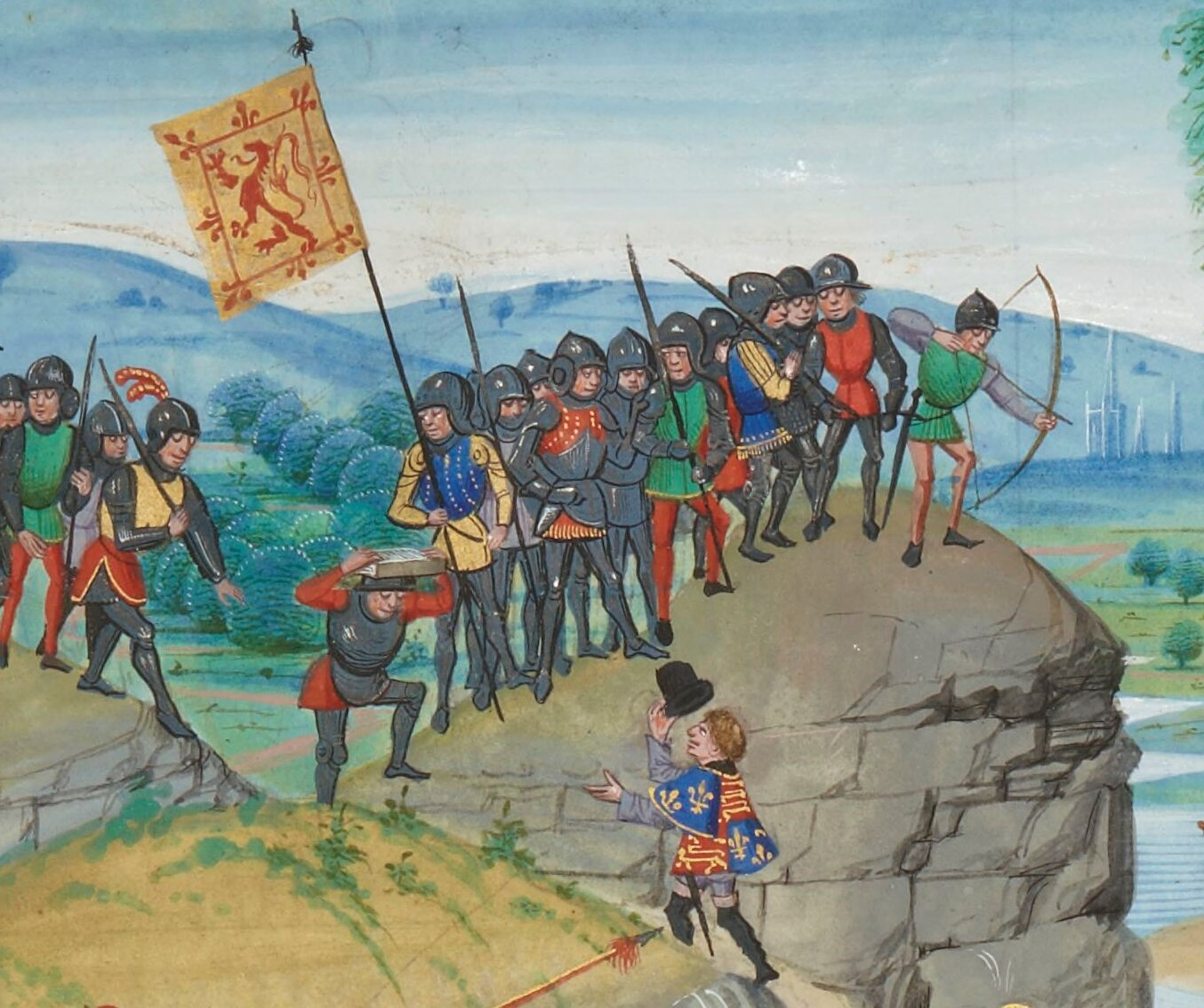
Scottish soldiers in the period of the Hundred Years' War, detail from an edition of Froissart's Chronicles

Before the Wars of the Three Kingdoms in 1644, there was no standing army in the Kingdom of Scotland. In the Early Middle Ages war in Scotland was characterised by the use of small war-bands of household troops often engaging in raids and low level warfare. By the High Middle Ages, the kings of Scotland could command forces of tens of thousands of men for short periods as part of the "common army", mainly of poorly armoured spear and bowmen. After the "Davidian Revolution" of the 12th century, which introduced elements of feudalism to Scotland, these forces were augmented by small numbers of mounted and heavily armoured knights. These armies rarely managed to stand up to the usually larger and more professional armies produced by England, but they were used to good effect by Robert I of Scotland at Battle of Bannockburn in 1314 to secure Scottish independence. After the Wars of Scottish Independence, the Auld Alliance between Scotland and France played a large part in the country's military activities, especially during the Hundred Years' War. In the Late Middle Ages under the Stewart kings forces were further augmented by specialist troops, particularly men-at-arms and archers, hired by bonds of manrent, similar to English indentures of the same period. Scottish warfare in this period was mostly raids and ambushes performed by Scottish nobles and men at arms who would fight on foot during pitched battles or on horse when skirmishing or carrying out raids. Contemporary depictions show nobles and their retinues in fine plate armor that is highly protective and well-suited for foot combat, with many wearing fine great bascinets late into the 15th century, possibly due to the need for extra protection from English bows and bills. They were accompanied by their retinues, usually mounted longbowmen or spearmen who would fight with the same flexibility, also preferring to fight on foot in pitched battle. Archers became much sought after as mercenaries in French armies of the 15th century in order to help counter the English superiority in this arm, becoming a major element of the French royal guards as the Garde Écossaise. Scotland played a major role in the Hundred Years' War, with many Scots present from Bauge all the way to the end of the Loire Valley Campaign and the Battle of Patay "The Scots Men-at-Arms and Life-Guards in France, From Their Formation Until Their Final Dissolution, A.D. MCCCCXVIII-MDCCCXXX (Volume I)". The Stewarts also adopted major innovations in continental warfare, such as longer pikes and the extensive use of artillery. However, in the early 16th century one of the best armed and largest Scottish armies ever assembled still met with defeat at the hands of an English army at the Battle of Flodden in 1513, which saw the destruction of a large number of ordinary troops, a large section of the nobility and the king James IV.

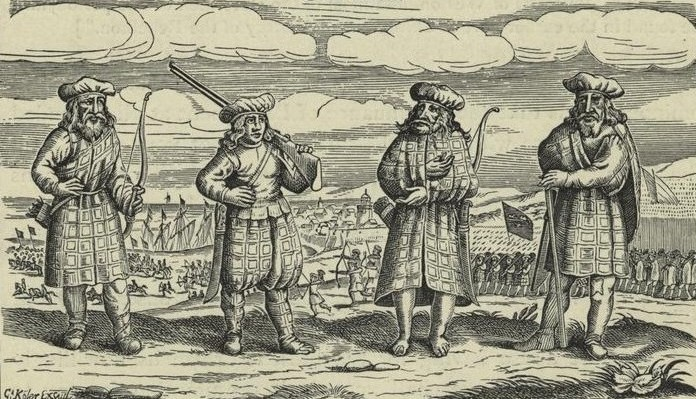
The earliest image of Scottish soldiers wearing tartan; 1631 German engraving.

In the sixteenth century the crown took an increasing role in the supply of military equipment. The pike began to replace the spear and the Scots began to convert from the bow to gunpowder firearms. The feudal heavy cavalry had begun to disappear from Scottish armies and the Scots fielded relatively large numbers of light horse, often drawn from the borders. James IV brought in experts from France, Germany and the Netherlands and established a gun foundry in 1511. A clan leader like John Grant of Freuchie in 1596 could muster from his kin, friends, and servants 500 men able to fight for King James and the Sheriff of Moray. Of these 40 had habergeons, two handled swords, and helmets, and another 40 were armed "according to the Highland custom" with bows, helmets, swords, and targes.

In the early seventeenth century relatively large numbers of Scots took service in foreign armies involved in the Thirty Years' War. As armed conflict with Charles I in the Bishop's Wars became likely, hundreds of Scots mercenaries returned home from foreign service, including experienced leaders like Alexander and David Leslie and these veterans played an important role in training recruits. These systems would form the basis of the Covenanter armies that intervened in the Civil Wars in England and Ireland. Scottish infantry were generally armed, as was almost universal in Western Europe, with a combination of pike and shot. Scottish armies may also have had individuals with a variety of weapons including bows, Lochaber axes, and halberds. Most cavalry were probably equipped with pistols and swords, although there is some evidence that they included lancers. Royalist armies, like those led by James Graham, Marquis of Montrose (1643–44) and in Glencairn's rising (1653–54), were mainly composed of conventionally armed infantry with pike and shot. Montrose's forces were short of heavy artillery suitable for siege warfare and had only a small force of cavalry.

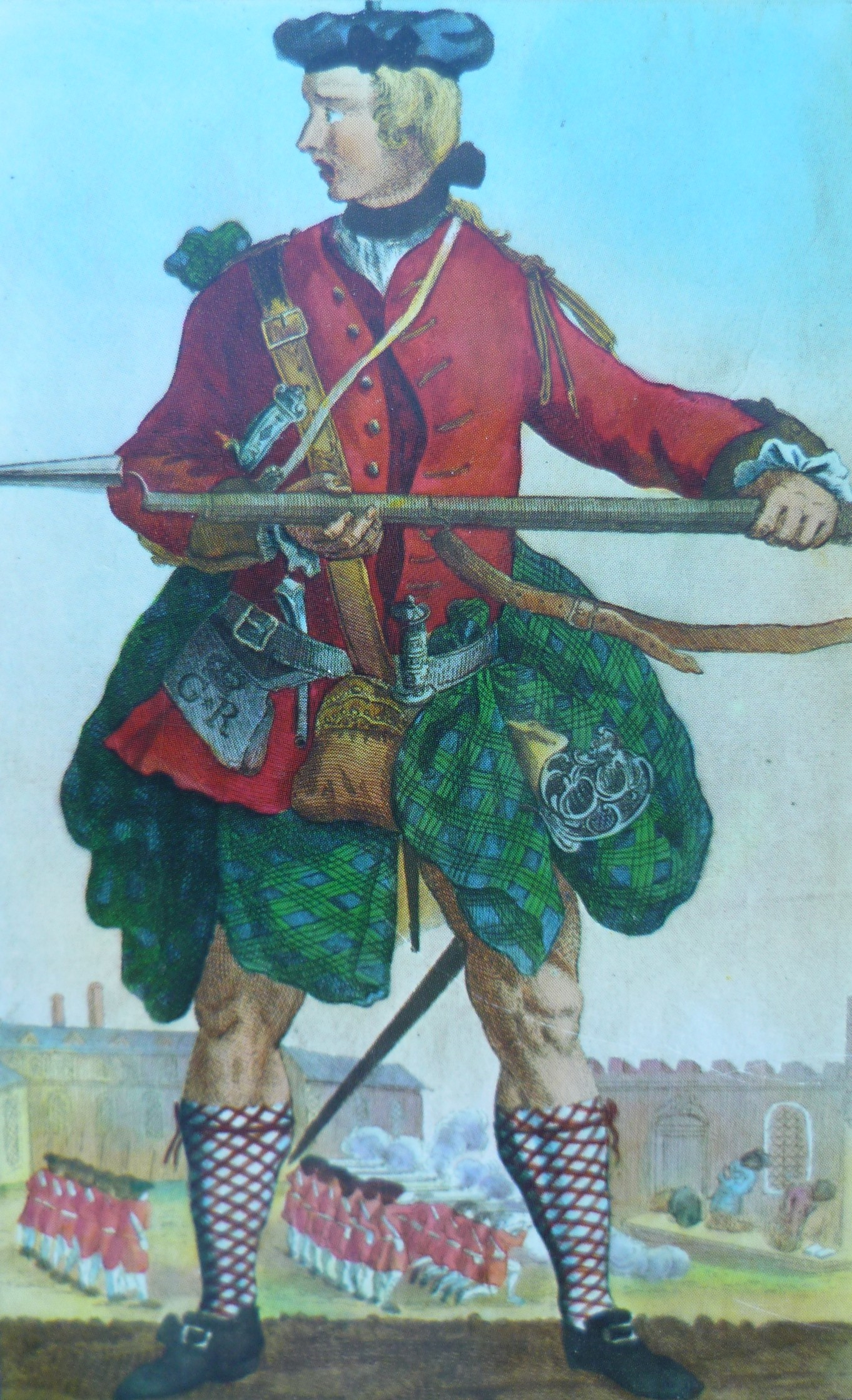
Soldier of the Black Watch c. 1740

At the Restoration the Privy Council established a force of several infantry regiments and a few troops of horse and there were attempts to found a national militia on the English model. The standing army was mainly employed in the suppression of Covenanter rebellions and the guerrilla war undertaken by the Cameronians in the East. Pikemen became less important in the late seventeenth century and after the introduction of the socket bayonet disappeared altogether, while matchlock muskets were replaced by the more reliable flintlock. On the eve of the Glorious Revolution the standing army in Scotland was about 3,000 men in various regiments and another 268 veterans in the major garrison towns. After the Glorious Revolution the Scots were drawn into King William II's continental wars, beginning with the Nine Years' War in Flanders (1689–97). By the time of the Act of Union, the Kingdom of Scotland had a standing army of seven units of infantry, two of horse and one troop of Horse Guards, besides varying levels of fortress artillery in the garrison castles of Edinburgh, Dumbarton, and Stirling.

=== Wars and battles to 1707 ===
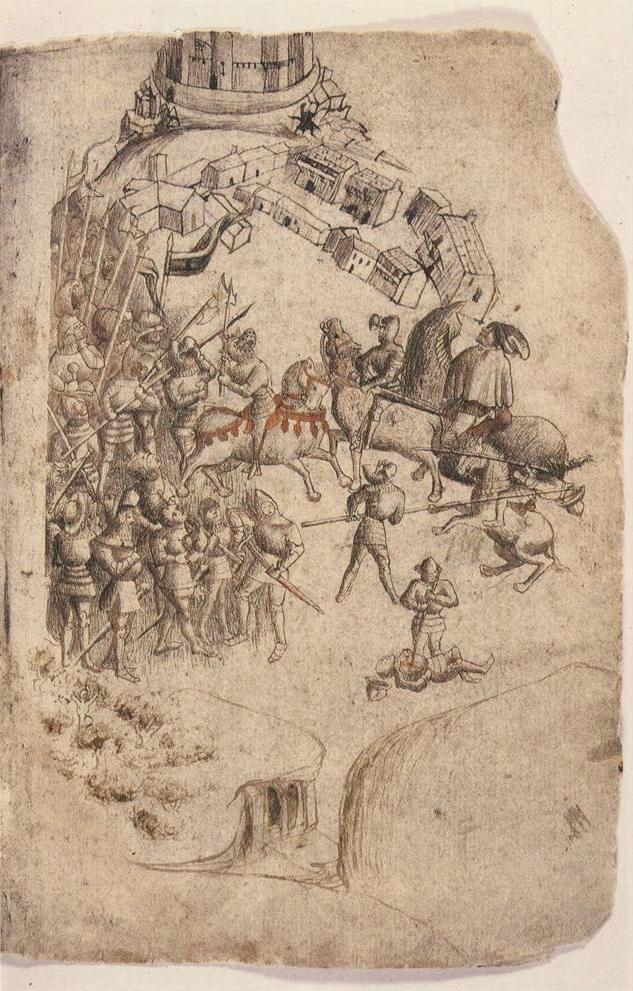
The earliest known depiction of the Battle of Bannockburn in 1314 from a 1440s manuscript of Walter Bower's Scotichronicon

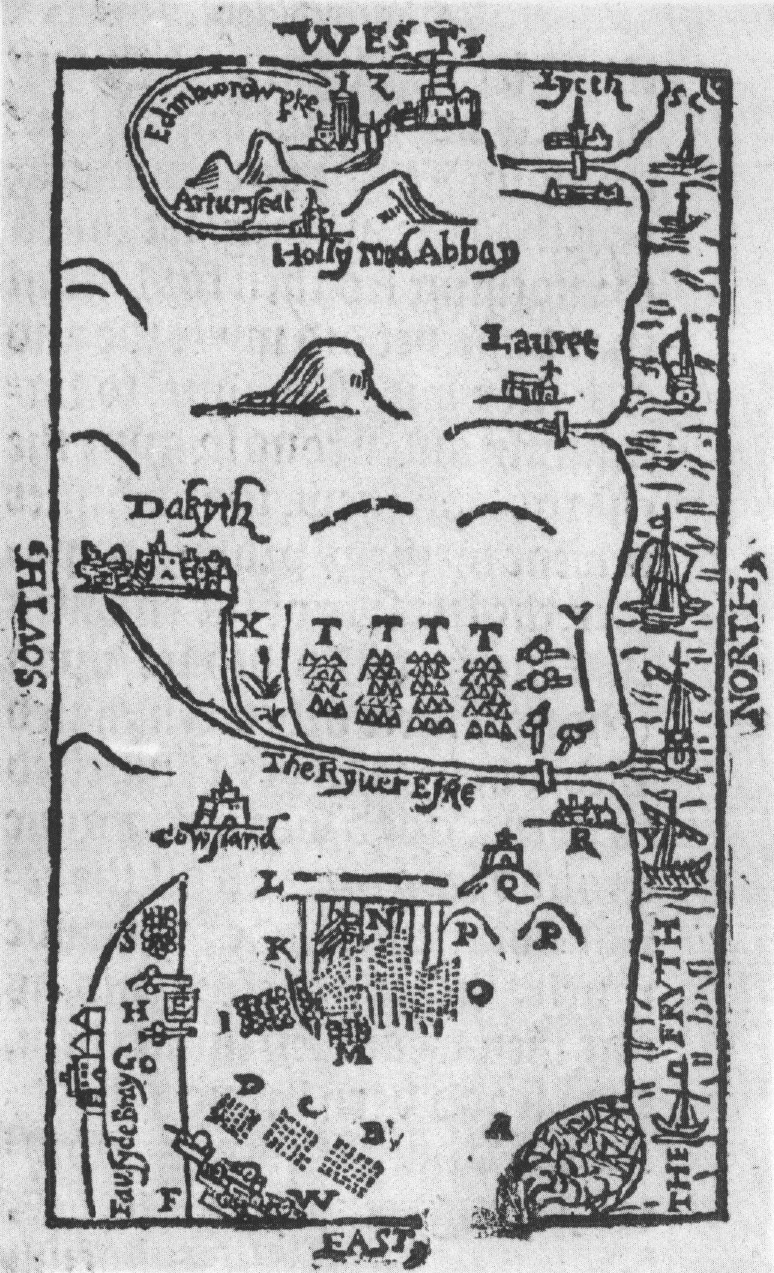
Battle of Pinkie, woodcut illustration from William Patten, (1548)

- Scottish–Norwegian War
  - Battle of Largs
- Wars of Scottish Independence
  - First War of Scottish Independence
    - Battle of Dunbar
    - Battle of Stirling Bridge
    - Battle of Falkirk
    - Battle of Bannockburn
  - Second War of Scottish Independence
    - Battle of Halidon Hill
    - Battle of Nesbit Moor
- Anglo-Scottish Wars
  - Battle of Otterburn
  - Battle of Nesbit Moor
  - Battle of Piperdean
  - Battle of Sark
- War of the League of Cambrai
  - Battle of Flodden
- Rough Wooing
  - Battle of Ancrum Moor
  - Battle of Pinkie
  - Siege of Haddington
- Marian civil war
  - Battle of Langside
  - Lang Siege
- Wars of the Three Kingdoms
  - Bishops' Wars
  - Irish Confederate Wars
  - First English Civil War
  - Second English Civil War
    - Battle of Preston
  - Third English Civil War
    - Battle of Dunbar
    - Battle of Worcester
- Jacobite risings
  - Jacobite rising (1689–92)
    - Battle of Killiecrankie
- War of the Spanish Succession
  - Battle of Blenheim

=== Castles ===
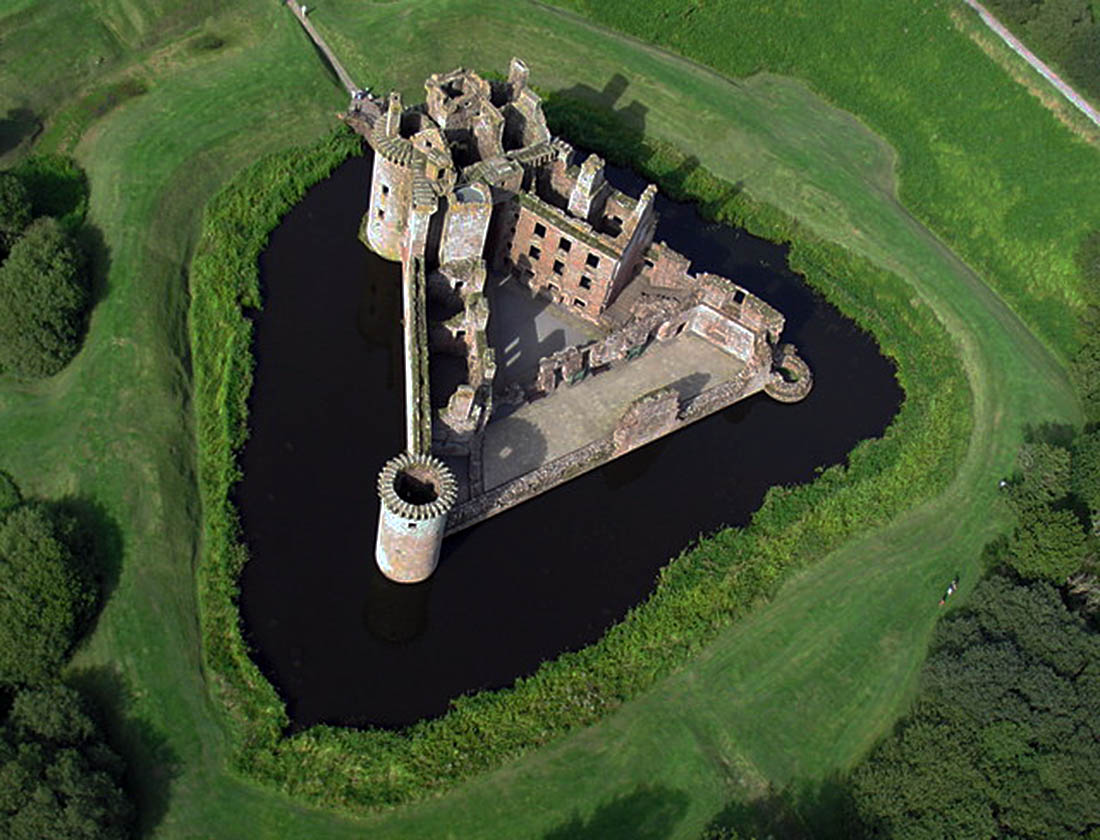
Caerlaverock Castle, a moated triangular castle, first built in the thirteenth century

Castles arrived in Scotland with the introduction of feudalism in the twelfth century. Initially these were wooden motte-and-bailey constructions, but many were replaced by stone castles with a high curtain wall. During the Wars of Independence, Robert the Bruce pursued a policy of castle slighting. In the late Middle Ages new castles were built, some on a grander scale as "livery and maintenance" castles that could support a large garrison. Gunpowder weaponry led to the use of gun ports, platforms to mount guns and walls adapted to resist bombardment.

Many of the late Medieval castles built in the borders were in the form of tower houses, smaller pele towers or simpler bastle houses. From the fifteenth century there was a phase of Renaissance palace building, which restructured them as castle-type palaces, beginning at Linlithgow. Elements of Medieval castles, royal palaces and tower houses were used in the construction of Scots baronial estate houses, which were built largely for comfort, but with a castle-like appearance. In the seventeenth and eighteenth centuries the military significance of castles declined, but they increasingly became tourist attractions. Elements of the Scots Baronial style would be revived from the late eighteenth century and the trend would be confirmed in popularity by the rebuilding of Balmoral Castle in the nineteenth century and its adoption as a retreat by Queen Victoria. In the twentieth century there were only isolated examples of new castle-influenced houses.

=== Highlander military traditions ===
Since the Middle Ages, the Scottish Highlands have produced a specific breed of soldier—men characterized by their hardiness and intrepid spirit. They were known for the Highland charge, an aggressive battlefield shock tactic. For centuries, Highlanders were a staple of European armies, serving as highly sought-after recruits across the continent. This military legacy was rooted in the ancient clan system. The social structure of the Highlands mandated military service from all able-bodied males. Even as inter-clan warfare began to decline in the 16th century, the cultural tradition of the "warrior-citizen" remained, providing a steady supply of raw military material. In the 17th century, continental wars drew Highlanders into foreign service, following a path their ancestors had walked for over four hundred years. While they fought in the British Civil Wars and joined the British Army after its 1660 reconstruction, they were not yet a distinct entity; in these early forces, they were not distinguished by their native Highland dress. A turning point came in the early 18th century. Independent companies were raised to police their own neighbors, famously wearing the native plaid and bonnet. In 1739, these companies were consolidated into a single regiment: the Black Watch. This marked the official birth of the first Highland regiment in the British Army. Throughout the 18th century, various regiments were raised and disbanded, but their impact was permanent. Their reputation as redoubtable soldiers for the British Army was forged on global battlefields —from India, to the American colonies, and through the Napoleonic Wars of 1793-1815. In the 21st century the British Army continues to maintain Highland regiments, preserving their unique music and traditions. However, the demographic has shifted. While the legend was born in the desolate mountains, modern recruits are now primarily drawn from Scotland’s populous urban centers.

== Part of the British Armed Forces ==
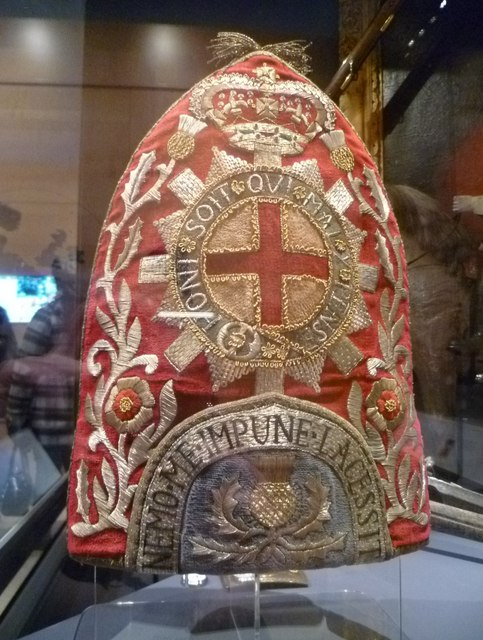
Scottish soldier's cap worn after the 1707 Union

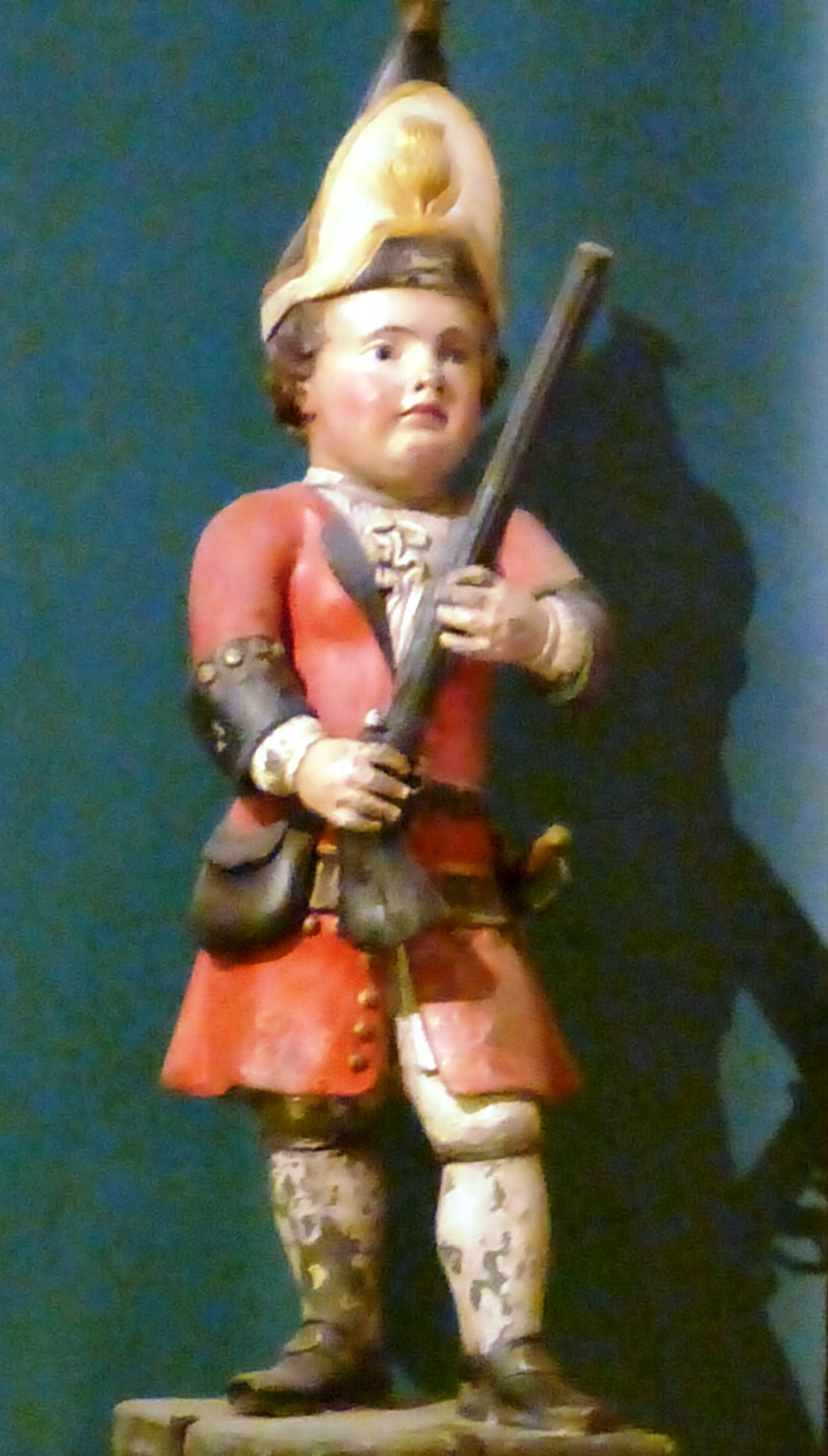
Comical depiction of a Scottish soldier, c.1720

After the Act of Union in 1707, the Scottish Army and Navy merged with those of England. The new British Army incorporated existing Scottish regiments, such as the Scots Guards (Marquis of Argyll's Royal Regiment), The Royal Scots 1st of Foot (Royal Regiment of Foot), King's Own Scottish Borderers 25th of Foot (Leven's Regiment), The 26th (Cameronian) Regiment of Foot (The Earl of Angus's Regiment), Scots Greys (Scots Dragoons) and the Royal Scots Fusiliers 21st of Foot (Earl of Mar's Regiment of Foot). The three vessels of the small Royal Scottish Navy were transferred to the Royal Navy (Royal William, a fifth-rate 32-gun frigate, became HMS Edinburgh; Royal Mary, a sixth-rate 24 gun frigate, became HMS Glasgow; Dumbarton Castle, a sixth-rate frigate, became HMS Dumbarton Castle). The new Armed Forces were controlled by the War Office and Admiralty from London. From the mid-eighteenth century the British Army began to recruit relatively large numbers of Highlanders. The first official Highland regiment to be raised for the British army was the Black Watch in 1740, but the growth of Highland regiments was delayed by the 1745 Jacobite Rebellion. During this period, Scottish soldiers and sailors were instrumental in supporting the expansion of the British Empire and became involved in many international conflicts. These included the War of the Spanish Succession (1702–13), the Quadruple Alliance (1718–20), the War of the Austrian Succession (1740–48), the Seven Years' War (1756–63) and the American Wars of Independence (1775–83).

=== Napoleonic Wars ===
Scots had a notable influence in warfare during this period. Prominent sailors of the era included:

- Admiral Sir Charles (John) Napier.
- Admiral Adam Duncan, 1st Viscount Duncan of Camperdown, led the Royal Navy fleet that defeated the Dutch at the Battle of Camperdown on 11 October 1797.
- Admiral Thomas Cochrane, 10th Earl of Dundonald, was one of the most daring and successful captains of the Napoleonic Wars, leading the French to nickname him "le loup de mer" ("the sea wolf"). After being dismissed from the Royal Navy, he served in the rebel navies of Chile, Brazil and Greece during their wars of independence, before being reinstated as an admiral in the Royal Navy. His life and exploits were one of the inspirations for the twentieth-century novelists C. S. Forester's Horatio Hornblower and Patrick O'Brian's Jack Aubrey.
- Lieutenant-general Sir John Moore.
- Alexander Abercromby.
- Thomas Graham, 1st Baron Lynedoch.
- George Ramsay, 9th Earl of Dalhousie.
- Robert Craufurd.
- John Hope, 4th Earl of Hopetoun

=== First World War ===
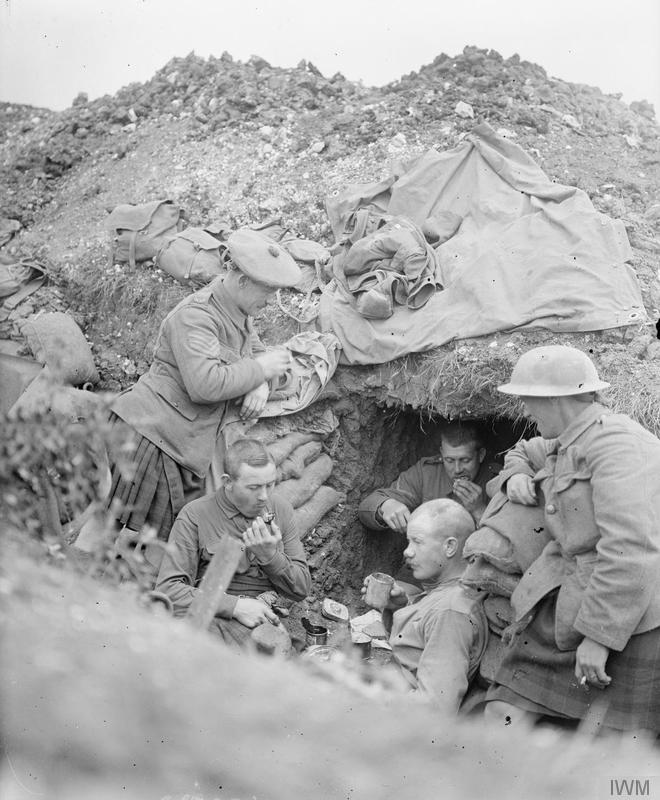
Cameronians (Scottish Rifles) in a trench at the Somme, 1916

Field Marshal Sir Douglas Haig led the British Army on the Western Front from 1915, and oversaw some of the largest and bloodiest episodes of the war. Battles included the Somme(1916) Ypres (1917) Cambrai (1917) Amiens (1918) and Arras (1918) Due to the kilts worn by the Scottish soldiers on the World War I battlefront, their German enemies called them the "ladies from hell". Haig founded the Earl Haig Poppy Fund, for ex-servicemen in the aftermath.

According to the historian T C Smout, "It is still not known how many Scots died in the war. One well-argued estimate put the figure at 110,000, equivalent to about 10 percent of the Scottish male population aged between sixteen and fifty, and probably to about 15 per cent of total British war dead — the sacrifice was higher in proportionate terms than for any other country in the Empire."

=== Second World War ===
During the Second World War, Scotland once again played a key role in the war effort of Britain and the Commonwealth. The first German air raid over Britain during the war, and the first combat flight of the Supermarine Spitfire, took place on October 16th, 1939 when twelve German JU88 and 3 HE111 bombers of KG30 and KG26 bomber wings attacked the Rosyth Dockyard in the Firth of Forth. The attack force was intercepted by eleven Spitfire mk.1s from RAF No.602 and No.603 Squadrons. Nine of the German pilots were killed or wounded, with a further fifteen bailing from their aircraft and being captured on the ground. The three Germans who were killed in the raid were buried with military honours at Portobello Cemetery in Edinburgh.

Scotland’s main naval base throughout the war was Scapa Flow in the Orkney Islands, selected because of its distance from German airbases in occupied Europe. On October 14th, 1939, the crew of A lone German U-Boat infiltrated the British fortifications at Scapa Flow and fired two torpedo salvoes into the battleship HMS Royal Oak while she was anchored, sinking her and killing 834 crew members. Following an air raid by KG30 three days later, Winston Churchill ordered the creation of four causeways blocking access to Scapa Flow’s eastern approaches to prevent further infiltrations into the naval base.

Neither British nor German forces prioritised Scotland during the Battle of Britain, as England remained the primary strategic target for both sides, but Scotland nevertheless saw its share of action. The radar system, which helped British units on the ground detect incoming enemy aircraft, had been developed by a team of engineers in the 1930’s headed by Scottish engineer Sir Robert Watson-Watt and his English partner, Sir Henry Tizard. Radar was especially crucial in the defence of Southern England, as it gave RAF Squadrons on the ground time to get airborne and meet the incoming Luftwaffe before the enemy had reached their target. Scotland was largely spared during the first months of the Blitz bombing campaign in 1940, but in March 1941 the Scottish town of Clydebank was heavily targeted for its historic shipbuilding industry and weapons factories. Two thirds of all buildings in Clydebank were destroyed or damaged, with 1200 civilians killed or wounded.

Scottish soldiers served on every major front where the British Army was involved. During the Battle of France in 1940, most Scottish units were attached to the 51st (Highland) Division which found itself cut off from the main British force as the Germans advanced. While a handful of brigades managed to break through their encirclement and were evacuated at Dunkirk, most were forced to surrender alongside the French army. The division was reconstituted and sent to North Africa, where Scottish troops saw particularly fierce action at the Second Battle of El Alamein, the British counteroffensive against the Axis invasion of Egypt in 1942. In particular, the prestigious Black Watch regiment fought alongside New Zealander forces during the assault on Miteiriya Ridge on October 23rd, using the countersigns “Jock” (Scottish) and “Kiwi” (NZ) to identify one another in the darkness of the night.

After pushing the axis back through Egypt, Libya, and Tunisia, most of the Scottish units involved in the North Africa campaign went on to fight in Sicily and Italy. The Scots Guards regiment, for instance, landed at Salerno alongside the Royal Scots Dragoon Guards as part of Operation Avalanche, establishing a beachhead in Italy and mainland Europe by extension. As the allies advanced further into Italy and stalled in the face of stiff German defences, the Scots Guards were transferred to aid the Allied landings at Anzio. The guardsmen were mauled at Anzio, first failing to break through the German lines at the town of Campoleone and then barely clinging onto their own lines when the enemy counterattacked as part of Operation Fischfang.

During the Invasion of Normandy, Scottish troops played a crucial role in Battle for Caen. In late June 1944, the 51st Highland and 15th Scottish Divisions spearheaded Operation Epsom, the British effort to attack Caen from the city’s western flank after previous attempts had failed to penetrate the German defences. The 15th Scottish, alongside the 11th Armoured and 43rd Infantry Divisions, fought their way down a series of roads leading into Caen, opening up a path into the city that later became known as the Scottish corridor. The Scots held the corridor against repeated counterattacks from various Waffen SS Divisions, ultimately securing the route into Caen. British forces were not, however, able to exploit the gains made during Operation Epsom due to the strength of German positions in and around Caen itself, and the city would not fall until August.

Many of the Scottish regiments that fought in Normandy went on to accompany the allied advance through Belgium, the Netherlands, and eventually Germany. Both the 15th and 51st Divisions were constituted into XXX Corps for Operation Market Garden, advancing through Holland in an attempt to link up with the Anglo-American airborne landings further inland. Although XXX Corps managed to link up with US paratroopers at Eindhoven and Nijmegen, stiff German defences around Arnhem prevented a linkup with the British 1st Airborne Division and Polish 1st Parachute Brigade, both of which eventually surrendered after depleting their supplies. In February 1945, XXX Corps moved out of Holland and into Germany as part of Operation Veritable, the allied push towards the river Rhine. The two Scottish divisions which had fought in Market Garden fought in the Reichswald forest alongside Canadian and Welsh troops, which was captured in spite of determined German resistance.

The last action of Scottish troops in Europe was on April 29th, 1945, when the 15th Scottish became the first Commonwealth troops to cross the Elbe River in central Germany, four days after American and Soviet forces established contact with one another. Scotland lost 57,000 soldiers and civilians over the course of the war, with 450,000 deaths across the wider United Kingdom.

== Defence establishments in Scotland ==
=== Army ===
In the wake of the Jacobite risings, several fortresses were built throughout the Highlands in the 18th century by General Wade in order to pacify the region, including Fort George, Fort Augustus and Fort William. The Ordnance Survey was also commissioned to map the region. Later, due to their topography and perceived remoteness, parts of Scotland have housed many sensitive defence establishments, some controversial. During World War II, Allied and British Commandos trained at Achnacarry in the Highlands and the island of Gruinard was used for an exercise in biological warfare. Regular British Army Garrisons currently operational in Scotland are: Fort George near Inverness; Redford Barracks and Dreghorn Barracks in Edinburgh; and Glencorse Barracks at Penicuik.

=== Royal Naval ===
Between 1960 and 1991, the Holy Loch was a base for the US Navy's fleet of Polaris-armed George Washington-class ballistic missile submarines. Today, HM Naval Base Clyde, 25 miles (40 km) west of Glasgow, is the base for the four Trident-armed Vanguard-class ballistic missile submarines which are armed with approximately 200 Trident nuclear warheads. Since the decommissioning of free-falling bombs in 1998, the Trident SLBM system is the UK's only nuclear deterrent. HMS Caledonia at Rosyth in Fife is the support base for navy operations in Scotland and also serves as the Naval Regional Office (NRO Scotland and Northern Ireland). The Royal Navy's LR5 and Submarine Rescue Service is based in Renfrew, near Glasgow. The Royal Navy's submarine nuclear reactor development establishment, is at Vulcan NTRE, adjacent to Dounreay, which was the site of the UK's fast breeder nuclear reactor programme. RM Condor at Arbroath, Angus is home to 45 Commando, Royal Marines, part of 3 Commando Brigade. Also, the Fleet Protection Group Royal Marines is based at HMNB Clyde.

Since 1999, the Scottish Government has had devolved responsibility over fisheries protection duties in Scotland's exclusive economic zone, carried out by the Scottish Fisheries Protection Agency, which consists of a fleet of four offshore patrol vessels and two Cessna 406 maritime patrol aircraft.

=== Royal Air Force ===
A single front-line Royal Air Force station is in Scotland. RAF Lossiemouth, in Moray, is the RAF's northern QRA(I) base, supported by four squadrons of Typhoons.

=== Military training areas ===
The only open air live depleted uranium weapons test range in the British Isles is near Dundrennan. As a result, over 7000 weakly radioactive munitions lie on the seabed of the Solway Firth. In 2007, the MoD land holdings in Scotland (owned, leased or with legal rights) was 1,153 km^{2} representing 31.5% of the MoD's British estate. Prominent Training Areas include Garelochhead, Cape Wrath, Barry Buddon, The Army Selection and Development Center in Penicuik, and Castlelaw in the Pentland Hills. Other facilities include Fort George Ranges and Training Complex near Inverness, which supports live-fire and non-firing military exercises.

=== Industry ===
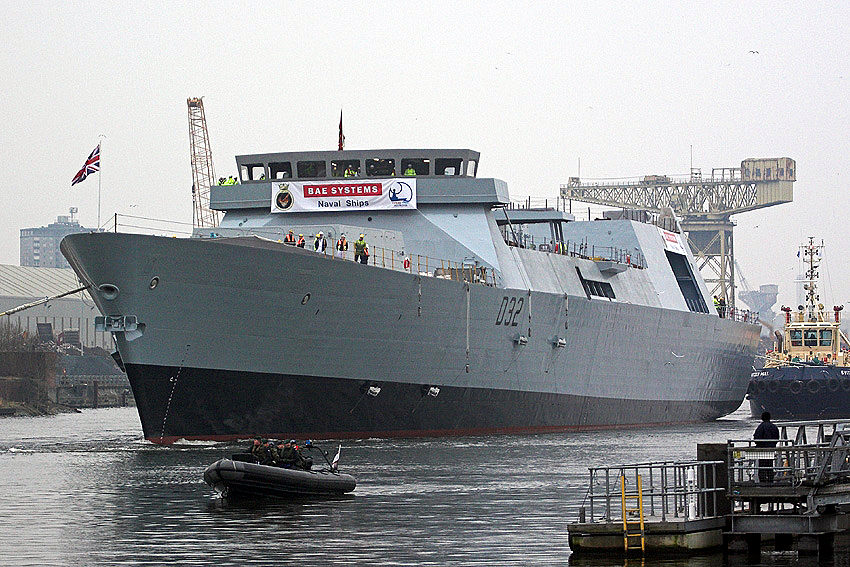
The bulk of the Royal Navy's surface fleet, such the Type 45 destroyer HMS Daring, is designed and built by BAE Systems Surface Ships in Glasgow. Although diminished from its early 20th century heights, Glasgow remains the hub of the UK's shipbuilding industry.

Defence contractors and related companies employ around 30,000 people in Scotland and form an important part of the economy. The principal companies operating in the country include: BAE Systems, Rolls-Royce, Raytheon, Thales and Babcock.

=== Royal Navy bases in Scotland ===
- HMNB Clyde (HMS Neptune), Argyll and Bute
- Rosyth Dockyard (HMS Caledonia), Fife
- DM Beith, Beith, North Ayrshire
- RM Condor formerly HMS Condor, Arbroath, Angus
- Loch Ewe

==== Former Royal Navy bases in Scotland ====
- Scapa Flow, Orkney
- Invergordon, Easter Ross
- Port Edgar, South Queensferry, City of Edinburgh
- HMS Cochrane, Rosyth
- Port HHZ, Loch a' Chàirn Bhàin, Kylesku, Sutherland, Highland
- HMS Columbine, Royal Navy Destroyer Depot. Based at Port Edgar 1917–1938
- HMS Curlew, Inellan, Dunoon, Argyll & Bute Harbour Defence Depot
- HMS Dundonald, Troon, Combined Operations Craft Working up base
- HMS Hopetoun, Combined Operations Training Centre. Based at Port Edgar 1943–1945
- HMS Lochinvar. Minesweeping & Fisheries Protection Depot. Based at Port Edgar 1939–1943 and 1946–1975. Based at Granton 1943–1946
- HMS Quebec, Inverary, Argyll & Bute, Combined Operations Craft Working up base
- HMS Varbel, Port Bannatyne, Argyll & Bute, Midget submarine training shore base
- HMS Western Isles, Tobermory, Argyll & Bute, Anti-submarine working up base

==== Former Royal Naval Air Stations in Scotland ====
- HMS Condor, Arbroath, Angus
- HMS Fieldfare, Evanton, Ross and Cromarty, Highland
- HMS Fulmar, Lossiemouth, Moray
- HMS Gannet, Prestwick, South Ayrshire
- HMS Jackdaw, Crail, Fife
- HMS Landrail, Macrihanish, Argyll and Bute
- HMS Merganser, Rattray, Aberdeenshire
- HMS Merlin, Donibristle, Fife
- HMS Nighthawk, Drem, East Lothian
- HMS Owl, Fearn, Wester Ross, Highland
- HMS Peewit, East Haven, Angus
- HMS Robin, Grimsetter, Kirkwall, Orkney
- HMS Sanderling, Abbotsinch, Renfrewshire: (Now Glasgow International Airport)
- HMS Sparrowhawk, Hatston, Orkney
- HMS Tern, Twatt, Orkney
- HMS Wagtail, Heathfield, Ayr, South Ayrshire

=== Royal Air Force stations in Scotland ===
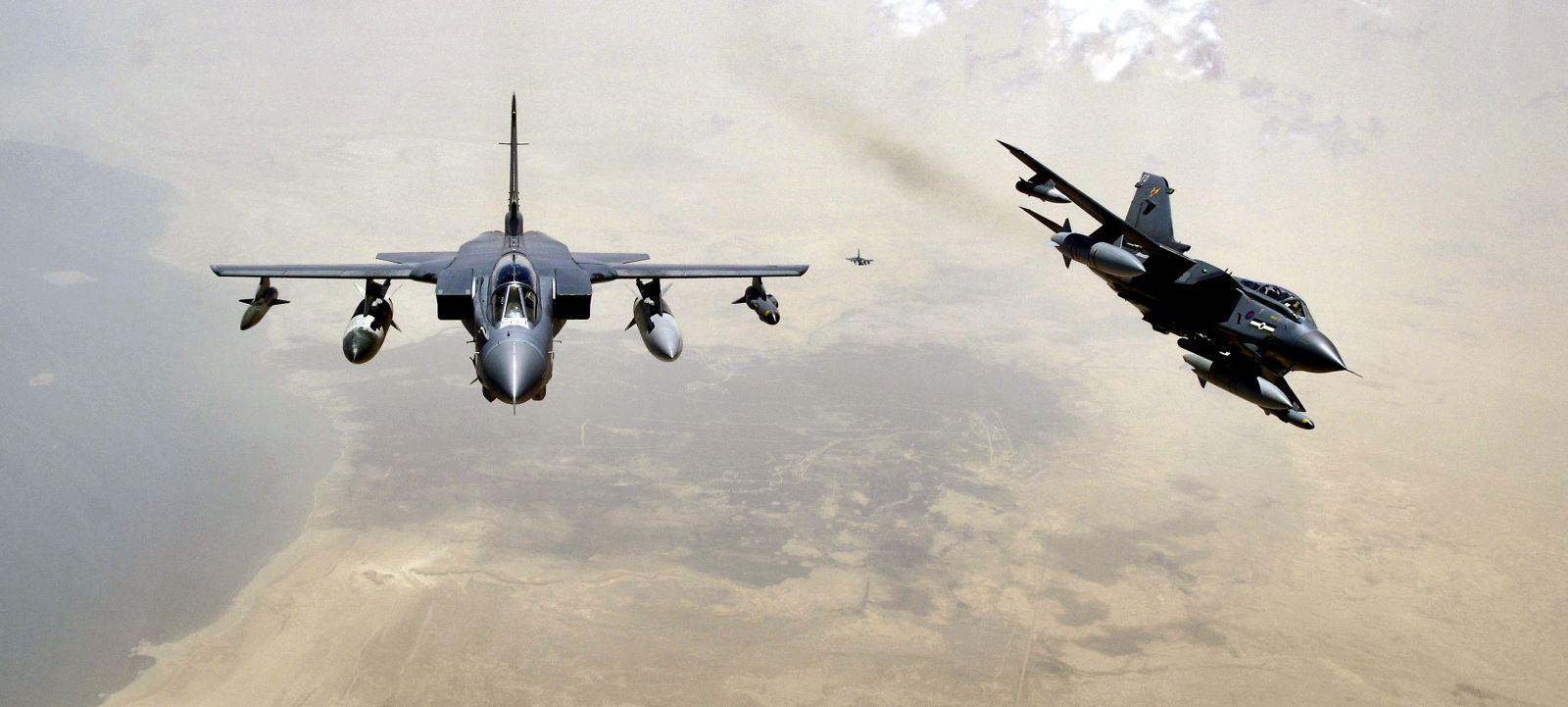
RAF Lossiemouth's former No. 617 Squadron RAF Tornado GR4 aircraft

- RAF Benbecula
- RAF Kirknewton
- RAF Lossiemouth
- RAF Tain

==== Former Royal Air Force stations in Scotland ====
- RAF Alness
- RAF Annan
- RAF Balado Bridge
- RAF Banff
- RAF Bishopbriggs
- RAF Black Isle
- RAF Bowmore
- RAF Brackla
- RAF Buchan
- RAF Buttergask (11 EFTS)
- RAF Castle Kennedy
- RAF Castletown
- RAF Charterhall
- RAF Connel (244 MU)
- RAF Dalcross
- RAF Dallachy
- RAF Dornoch
- RAF Drem
- RAF Dumfries
- RAF Dundonald
- RAF Dunino
- RAF Dyce
- RAF East Fortune
- RAF Edzell
- RAF Elgin
- RAF Errol
- RAF Fordoun
- RAF Forres
- RAF Fraserburgh
- RAF Gailes
- RAF Grangemouth
- RAF Greenock
- RAF Helensburgh (MAEE)
- RAF Inverness
- RAF Isbister Bay?
- RAF Kidsdale (Burrow Head) (No. 651 Sqn)
- RAF Kinloss
- RAF Kirkandrews (No. 15 EFTS)
- RAF Kirkpatrick (No. 15 EFTS)
- RAF Kirkton
- RAF Kirkwall?
- RAF Largs (No. 231 Sqn)
- RAF Leanach
- RAF Lennoxlove
- RAF Lerwick
- RAF Leuchars
- RAF Lossiemouth
- RAF Low Eldrig
- RAF Machrihanish
- RAF Milltown
- RAF Montrose
- RAF Oban
- RAF Perth
- RAF Peterhead
- RAF Portellon?
- RAF Prestwick
- RAF Renfrew
- RAF Saxa Vord
- RAF Skatsa?
- RAF Skeabrae
- RAF Skitten
- RAF Stornoway
- RAF Stravithie
- RAF Sullom Voe
- RAF Sumburgh
- RAF Tealing
- RAF Tiree
- RAF Turnberry
- RAF Turnhouse
- RAF West Freugh
- RAF Whitefield (No 11 EFTS/No 5 FIS)
- RAF Wick
- RAF Windyhead?
- RAF Wigtown
- RAF Winterseugh
- RAF Woodhaven (No. 201 Sqn/No. 333 Sqn/No. 1477 (Norwegian) Flight)

=== Scottish units in the British Army ===
Previously within the British Army, the Scottish Infantry comprised a number of 'county regiments', each recruiting from a local area. In 2006, the remaining regiments, known collectively as the Scottish Division, were amalgamated to form the Royal Regiment of Scotland. The amalgamation was vigorously opposed by veterans and supporters of the old regiments. Scottish soldiers serve nationally alongside soldiers from England, Wales and Northern Ireland in all Combat Support Arms and Services (RA, RE, Signals, Intelligence, AAC, RLC, AGC, REME and AMS), Special Forces, the Household Cavalry and the Parachute Regiment of the British Army, with the following current Formations and Units having specific Scottish connections:

- 51 (Scottish) Brigade
- 52 Infantry Brigade
- Royal Regiment of Scotland
- Scots Guards
- Royal Scots Dragoon Guards
- 1st Royal Tank Regiment
- 19th Regiment Royal Artillery
- 40th Regiment Royal Artillery
- A (London Scottish) Company London Regiment
- 105th Regiment Royal Artillery
- 32 (Scottish) Signal Regiment
- 154 (Scottish) Regiment RLC
- A (Ayrshire (Earl of Carrick's Own) Yeomanry) & C (Fife and Forfar Yeomanry/Scottish Horse) Squadrons of the Queen's Own Yeomanry Regiment

==== Former Scottish units in the British Army ====
- 9th (Scottish) Division
- 15th (Scottish) Division
- 51st (Highland) Division
- 52nd (Lowland) Division
- Highland Brigade
- Lowland Brigade
- 4th Royal Tank Regiment
- The Cameronians (Scottish Rifles)
- Glasgow Highlanders
- The Gordon Highlanders
- Highland Light Infantry
- Liverpool Scottish
- London Scottish
- King's Own Scottish Borderers
- Queen's Own Cameron Highlanders
- Queen's Own Highlanders (Seaforth and Camerons)
- The Royal Scots
- Royal Scots Fusiliers
- Scots Greys
- Seaforth Highlanders
- 93rd (Sutherland) Highlanders

=== Regular British Army units currently based in Scotland ===
- The Royal Highland Fusiliers, 2nd Battalion The Royal Regiment of Scotland – Glencorse Barracks
- The Black Watch, 3rd Battalion The Royal Regiment of Scotland – Fort George
- 3rd Battalion, The Rifles – Redford Barracks
- Balaklava Company (Argylls) 5th Battalion The Royal Regiment of Scotland – Redford Barracks Edinburgh
- 39 Engineer Regiment (Kinloss Barracks)
- Royal Scots Dragoon Guards (Leuchars Station)

=== Scottish units not part of the British Army ===
- Atholl Highlanders
- Royal Company of Archers
- High Constables of Holyroodhouse

== Scottish regiments in other countries ==
=== Australia ===
List of active regiments in the Australian Army:

- 5th/6th Battalion, Royal Victoria Regiment (Victorian Scottish Regiment)
- 10th/27th Battalion, Royal South Australia Regiment (South Australian Scottish Regiment)
- 16th Battalion, Royal Western Australia Regiment (Cameron Highlanders)
- 41st Battalion, Royal New South Wales Regiment (Byron Scottish Regiment)

List of former Scottish regiments in Australia:

- 30th Battalion (The New South Wales Scottish Regiment)
- 61st Battalion (The Queensland Cameron Highlanders)

List of former Scottish regiments in the Australian colonial forces:

- Byron Regiment (Sutherland)
- New South Wales Scottish Regiment
- South Australian Scottish Regiment
- Victorian Scottish Regiment (VSR)

=== Canada ===
List of active regiments in the Canadian Forces:

- 42nd Field Artillery Regiment (Lanark and Renfrew Scottish), RCA
- 48th Highlanders of Canada 1891
- The Argyll and Sutherland Highlanders of Canada (Princess Louise's) 1903
- The Black Watch (Royal Highland Regiment) of Canada 1862
- Cape Breton Highlanders 1871–1954 2011–present
- The Calgary Highlanders (10th Canadians) 1910
- The Cameron Highlanders of Ottawa (Duke of Edinburgh's Own) 1881
- The Canadian Scottish Regiment (Princess Mary's) 1912
- The Essex and Kent Scottish 1954
- The Lake Superior Scottish Regiment 1905
- The Lorne Scots (Peel, Dufferin and Halton Regiment) 1866
- The Nova Scotia Highlanders 1871
- The Queen's Own Cameron Highlanders of Canada 1910
- The Royal Highland Fusiliers of Canada late 1940s
- The Seaforth Highlanders of Canada 1910
- The Stormont, Dundas and Glengarry Highlanders 1804
- The Toronto Scottish Regiment (Queen Elizabeth The Queen Mother's Own) 1920

Defunct Scottish regiments, many merged to former larger regiments:

- The Essex Scottish Regiment 1885–1954 – merged into The Essex and Kent Scottish
- The Pictou Highlanders 1871–1954, Cape Breton Highlanders 1871–1954 and The North Nova Scotia Highlanders – 1936–1954 merged to form The Nova Scotia Highlanders
- Highland Light Infantry of Canada 1886–1954 – merged into The Perth and Waterloo Regiment (Highland Light Infantry of Canada)
- The New Brunswick Scottish 1946–1954 – merged into The Royal New Brunswick Regiment
- 16th Canadian Battalion (The Canadian Scottish), CEF 1914–1920 – disbanded
- The 13th Scottish Light Dragoons 1872–1936 – disbanded
- Lorne Rifles (Scottish) – became The Lorne Scots (Peel, Dufferin and Halton Regiment)
- Cameronians Regiment of Foot
- Glengarry Fencibles, Glengarry Light Infantry

=== France ===
Inactive regiments of the French Army:

- Garde Écossaise 1418–1830
- Gens d'Armes Ecossais (Scots Men-At-Arms) – formed 1419 and dissolved 1791

=== South Africa ===
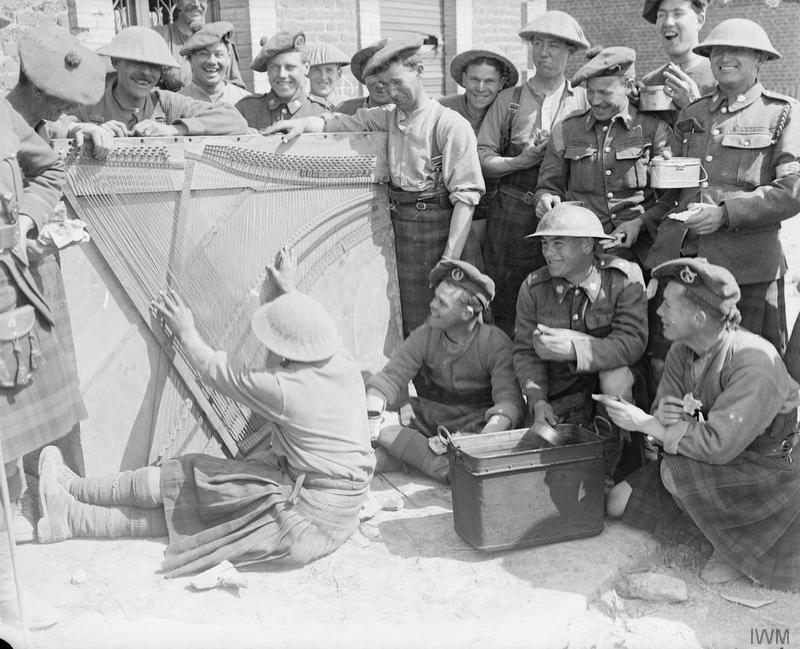
Troops of the South African Scottish regiment in France, 1917

There were (formerly) three regiments in the South African Defence Force with Scottish roots:

- Pretoria Highlanders 1939
- Transvaal Scottish Regiment 1902
- Cape Town Highlanders Regiment 1885
- Solomon Mahlangu Regiment 1902

=== New Zealand ===
- New Zealand Scots Regiment (1st NZ Scottish Regiment and 1st Armoured Car Regiment) was raised in 1939 and renamed 1990 as New Zealand Scottish and disbanded amongst other units:

- 1st Royal New Zealand Armoured Regiment of the Royal New Zealand Armoured Corps

== See also ==
- Scottish Highlands Military Traditions
- Nemo me impune lacessit, the national motto
- Scottish National War Memorial
- National War Museum of Scotland
- Army School of Bagpipe Music and Highland Drumming
- Claymore
- Schiltron
- Tam o'Shanter
- Earl Haig Fund Scotland
- Edinburgh Military Tattoo
- Highland charge
- Lord High Constable of Scotland
- Scottish Militia Bill 1708
- The Poker Club
- Garde du Corps
- The Thin Red Line (1854 battle)
- Scottish regiment
- Scottish War Memorials
- Munitions production:
  - HM Factory, Gretna
  - Nobel Industries (Scotland)
  - ROF Bishopton
  - ROF Dalmuir
