= RAF Honeybourne =

Former Royal Air Force station in Worcestershire, England

RAF Honeybourne
- Honeybourne, Worcestershire in England

Site information
- Type: Royal Air Force station parent station 1941-46
- Code: HQ
- Owner: Air Ministry
- Operator: Royal Air Force
- Controlled by: RAF Ferry Command; RAF Bomber Command * No. 6 (T) Group RAF * No. 91 (OTU) Group RAF

Location
- Shown within Worcestershire RAF Honeybourne (the United Kingdom)
- Coordinates: 52°04′47″N 001°50′28″W

Site history
- Built: 1940
- Built by: John Laing & Son Ltd
- In use: October 1941 - January 1946
- Battles/wars: European theatre of World War II

Airfield information
- Elevation: 54 metres (177 ft) AMSL
Runways
Direction	Length and surface
04/22	1,280 metres (4,199 ft) Asphalt
10/28	1,200 metres (3,937 ft) Asphalt
16/34	1,100 metres (3,609 ft) Asphalt

Royal Air Force Honeybourne, or more simply RAF Honeybourne, was a Royal Air Force station located 0.6 miles (0.97 km) south of Honeybourne, Worcestershire, England and 4.6 miles (7.4 km) east of Evesham, Worcestershire, England

The station was operational from 1940 or 1941 to 1946 or 15 November 1947.

== Station history ==
RAF Honeybourne had five hangars there was one J Type and 4 T2's. The airfield used a mixture of temporary and permanent accommodation and on 1 December 1944 there were 1,973 males and 382 females located at the airfield.

No. 24 Operational Training Unit RAF was formed on 15 March 1942 at RAF Honeybourne, as part of No. 7 Group RAF, within RAF Bomber Command, to train night bomber aircrew using Armstrong Whitworth Whitley, a British twin-engined medium bomber aircraft. It carried out three operational sorties during 1942. The unit converted to Vickers Wellington, a British twin-engined, long-range medium bomber, in April 1944 to train Royal Canadian Air Force aircrews, before disbanding in July 1945. It is also reported that the OTU may have flown leaflet dropping sorties.

A number of units from RAF Ferry Command were based at RAF Honeybourne, including the Ferry Training Unit RAF which used Lockheed Hudson an American light bomber and coastal reconnaissance aircraft, and Bristol Beaufort, a British twin-engined torpedo bomber, between November 1941 and March 1942. No. 1425 (Communication) Flight RAF equipped with Consolidated Liberator, operated at RAF Honeybourne between November 1941 and April 1942.

The airfield was protected by No. 2828 Squadron RAF Regiment

=== Postwar ===
The airfield was also temporarily home to No. 21 Operational Training Unit RAF. It operated Vickers Wellington aircraft based at RAF Enstone, but due to runway repairs from August 1945 for two months it used RAF Honeybourne. From October 1945 until 1946, No. 107 Sub Storage Unit from No. 8 Maintenance Unit RAF used the airfield for storing Vickers Wellington and General Aircraft Hamilcar gliders.

The role of the airfield changed after the Second World War, with the reduction of flying movements. There was a slight change in what the units did on the airfield when, from 1947, No. 107 Sub Storage Unit began to collect no longer needed Vickers Wellington aircraft, which were then scrapped and taken to Weston-sub-Edge goods yard (which was near to the south-western corner), where the railway was used to take the airframes to the necessary destination.

=== Accidents and incidents ===
- 7 August 1940 - Handley Page Hampden 'P2086' of No. 4 Ferry Pilots Pool RAF stalled attempting to force land after an engine failure.
- 24 December 1941 - Bristol Blenheim 'L8663' of Ferry Training Unit RAF stalled on approach.
- 10 March 1942 - Lockheed Hudson 'V8995' of the Ferry Training Unit RAF spun into ground.
- 20 July 1943 - Avro Anson 'DJ242' of No. 24 Operational Training Unit RAF undershot landing.
- 14 May 1944 - Armstrong Whitworth Whitley 'N1436' of No. 24 Operational Training Unit RAF stalled on overshoot.
- 6 January 1945 - Vickers Wellington 'HE633' of No. 24 OTU crashed on takeoff when an engine failed.
- 28 April 1947 - Vickers Wellington 'JA349' was hit by Vickers Wellington 'LR130' while parked.

== Current use ==
In July 1948 the site was closed and much has reverted to farmland with runways being removed in 1968.

During 1949 and into 1950 parts of the site were used for temporary housing for local families while new Council housing developments were being built in the area - people moving into the new houses when completed.

Since then, the airside area has evolved into the Honeybourne Airfield Trading Estate.
