= No. 10 Operational Training Unit RAF =

Royal Air Force training unit

No. 10 Operational Training Unit

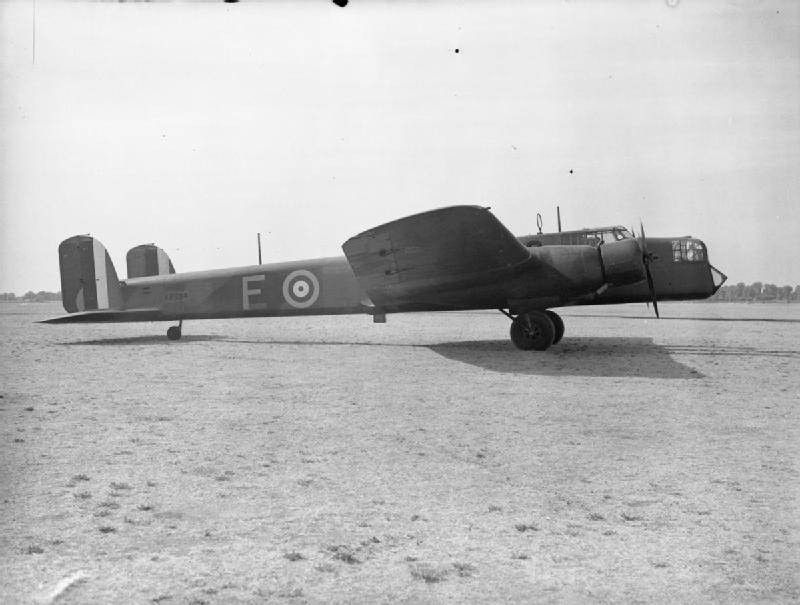
- A Whitley taxiing at Abingdon.
- Active: 8 April 1940 – 10 September 1946
- Country: United Kingdom
- Branch: Royal Air Force
- Role: Training

No. 10 Operational Training Unit RAF or more simply No. 10 OTU was a training unit operated by the Royal Air Force.

== History ==
The unit was formed at RAF Abingdon on 8 April 1940 with No. 97 Squadron RAF (97 Sqn) and No. 166 Squadron RAF (166 Sqn) flying Armstrong Whitworth Whitleys to train night bomber crews.

During 1942 10 OTU took control of an anti-submarine flight detached to St Eval and 10 OTU was transferred to No. 91 Group RAF.

On June 20, 1943, in the Bay of Biscay, one of a pair of Whitleys operated by 10 OTU from St. Eval was shot down while attacking a submarine believed to be the Barbarigo, of the Italian navy. All of the Whitley's crew were killed.

Between March and November 1944 the unit moved to RAF Stanton Harcourt whilst runways were laid at Abingdon with Vickers Wellingtons arriving from June. During September the last Whitley left and later in the year, during December, it gained the control of the Polish Flight from No. 18 Operational Training Unit RAF (18 OTU), until June 1945 when the flight disbanded.

10 OTU disbanded on 10 September 1946 back at Abingdon.

== Airfields used ==
- RAF Abingdon
- RAF Stanton Harcourt
- RAF St. Eval

== See also ==
- List of conversion units of the Royal Air Force
