= Hampstead Norreys =

Coordinates: 51.483794°N 1.240184°W

- Village and civil parish
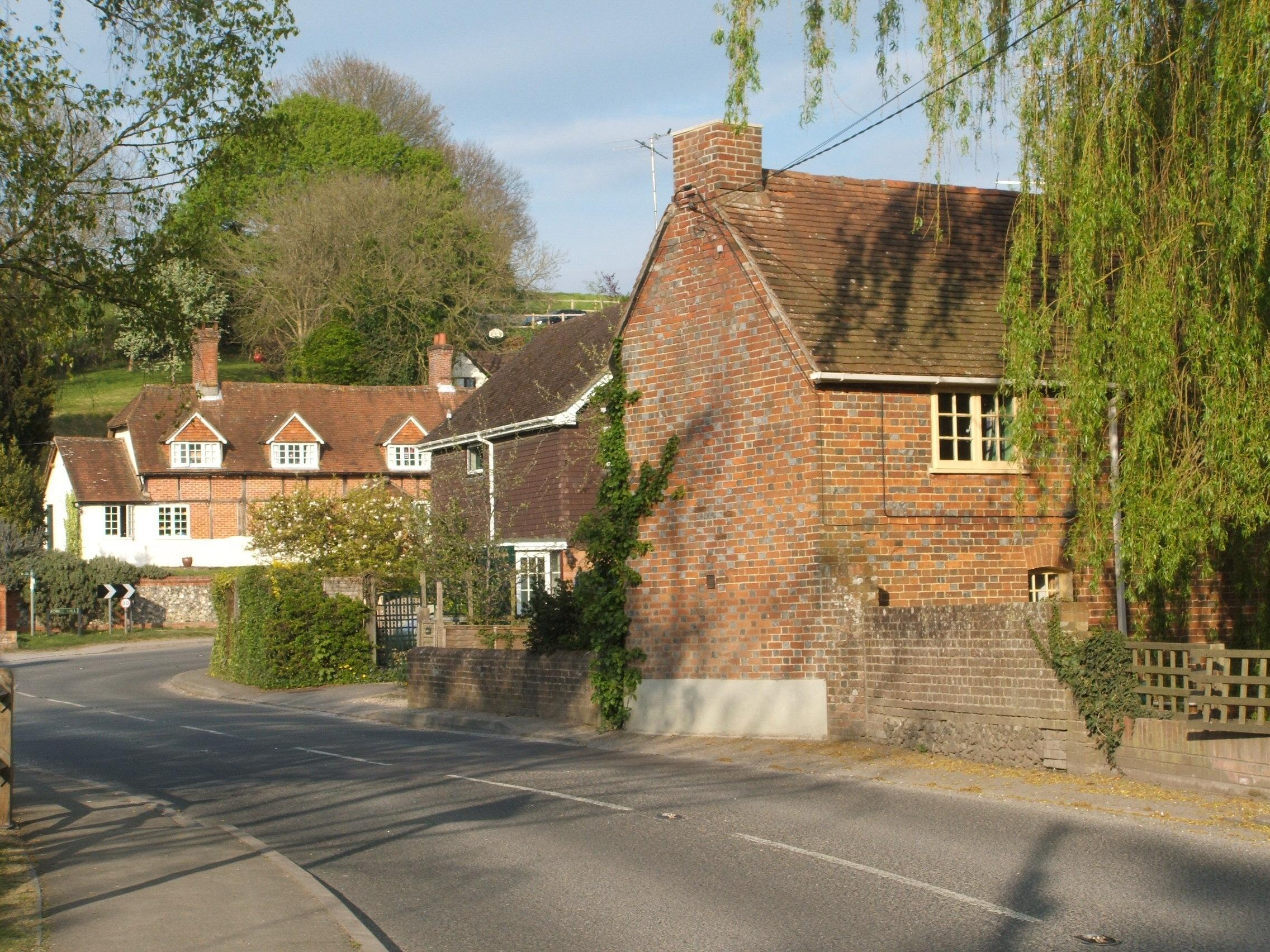
- Church Road (part of the B4009) in the east

- Location within Berkshire
- Area: 17.03 km^{2} (6.58 sq mi)
- Population: 832 (2011 census)
  - Density: 49/km^{2} (130/sq mi)
- OS grid reference: SU528763
- Civil parish: Hampstead Norreys
- Unitary authority: West Berkshire
- Ceremonial county: Berkshire
- Region: South East
- Country: England
- Sovereign state: United Kingdom
- Post town: THATCHAM
- Postcode district: RG18
- Dialling code: 01635
- Police: Thames Valley
- Fire: Royal Berkshire
- Ambulance: South Central
- UK Parliament: Reading West and Mid Berkshire

Hampstead Norreys (alternatively spelt Hampstead Norris as it is pronounced) is a village and civil parish in Berkshire, England. It is centred on the River Pang, north of Newbury. As well as the nucleus of Hampstead Norreys, the parish includes the hamlets of Bothampstead, Eling and Wyld Court. The village was recorded in the Domesday Book of 1086 as Hanstede.

== Amenities ==
In March 2011, a community shop was opened in the village, run by local volunteers. Shares in the shop were sold to village residents. It was the first community shop to be opened in a West Berkshire village since the 1990s.

== The Living Rainforest ==
Wyld Court is home to The Living Rainforest, an indoor glass house tropical rainforest with plants, animals and butterflies. It is an ecological centre, an educational centre and a visitor attraction.

== Historic buildings ==
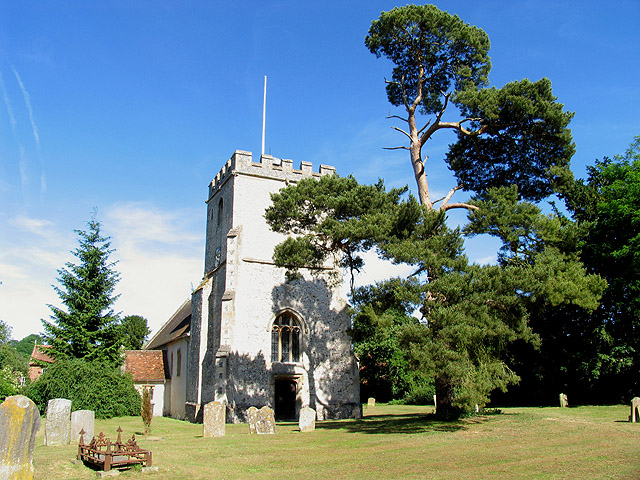
St Mary the Virgin's Church

The village parish church of St Mary the Virgin is noted for its Norman architecture. In the nearby woods are the remains of a Norman motte-and-bailey castle.

== Aviation ==
=== World War II ===
The village was close to the wartime airfield of RAF Hampstead Norris, an RAF Bomber Command Operational Training Unit (OTU) station. The airfield was host to a small number of squadrons of Wellington bombers. The site was bombed on 16 September 1940 by the Luftwaffe in the Battle of Britain. In 1945, the station was used by squadrons of Mosquito fighter bombers and became an ammunition storage depot as part of the Bramley Central Ammunition Depot near Basingstoke after its closure in 1946. Little of the wartime station now remains. There are four remaining pillboxes around where the airfield was, and a few air-raid shelters in the woods. Part of the bomb storage site remains.

=== Today ===
The site still maintains a modern link with aviation with a farm strip used by a Tiger Moth biplane. It is now known as Haw Farm, part of the Yattendon Estate. An impression of the old runway layout of airfield can still be seen from the air. On the edge of the perimeter track is a light beacon and an important VOR beacon known as Compton (CPT), named after the nearby village, which is used as a primary navigational aid for airway routes between European airports such as (Heathrow) and North America.

== Education ==
Hampstead Norreys has a small rural primary school which has served the community for over 150 years. The school is federated with the Ilsleys Primary School, with which it shares a headteacher.

== Transport ==
From 18 February 2013, Buses 6 and 6A from Newbury serve the village. The nearest station is Newbury which has regular services to east and west. Hampstead Norris railway station was a calling point on the Didcot, Newbury and Southampton Railway from 1872 until closure in 1962.

== Sport and leisure ==
The Dean Field is the local park in Hampstead Norreys. It contains football and cricket pitches and a children's play area. On the north side of the field is Hampstead Norreys village hall. It is considerably larger than the village halls in surrounding villages. On the south side is Eling estate, a large wooded area (consisting of Park Wood, Westbrook Copse, Down Wood and Elingpark Copse) backed by a path, on what remains of the old Didcot, Newbury and Southampton Railway, running between Hermitage and Compton, the two nearest villages.

== Demography ==
2011 Published Statistics: Population, home ownership and extracts from Physical Environment, surveyed in 2005
Output area	Homes owned outright	Owned with a loan	Socially rented	Privately rented	Other	km^{2} roads	km^{2} water	km^{2} domestic gardens	Usual residents	km^{2}
Civil parish	72	92	72	65	13	0.140	0.018	0.206	832	17.03
