= RAF Hampstead Norris =

Former RAF base in Berkshire, England

RAF Hampstead Norris
- Near Hampstead Norreys, Berkshire in England

Site information
- Type: Royal Air Force satellite station
- Code: HN
- Owner: Air Ministry
- Operator: Royal Air Force
- Controlled by: RAF Bomber Command 1940-44 * No. 6 (T) Group RAF * No. 91 (OTU) Group RAF; RAF Fighter Command 1944-45 * No. 38 Group RAF

Location
- Shown within Berkshire RAF Hampstead Norris (the United Kingdom)
- Coordinates: 51°29′28″N 001°12′48″W

Site history
- Built: 1940
- Built by: George Wimpey & Co Ltd
- In use: September 1940 - 1945
- Battles/wars: European theatre of World War II

Airfield information
- Elevation: 115 metres (377 ft) AMSL
Runways
Direction	Length and surface
00/00	Concrete/Tarmac
00/00	Concrete/Tarmac
00/00	Concrete/Tarmac

Royal Air Force Hampstead Norris or more simply RAF Hampstead Norris is a former Royal Air Force satellite station located 1.3 miles (2.1 km) north east of Hampstead Norreys, Berkshire, England and 10.6 miles (17.1 km) north west of Reading, Berkshire.

== Station history ==
The construction contract was awarded to Wimpey in May 1940 valued at £233,000. It was opened in mid 1940. Unusually the runways met at a single point, an obvious target to disable the entire airfield.

== Based units ==
No. 15 Operational Training Unit relocated to Hampstead Norris on 1 June 1940. The airfield hosted a number of squadrons of Vickers Wellington bombers. The airfield was used extensively as a glider training station during the latter part of the war, many glider pilots were trained here in preparation for D-Day. It also had 33 de Havilland Tiger Moths as training aircraft. The main role of the airfield was to ferry Wellingtons to Egypt, via Gibraltar and Malta.

On 15 March 1945 No. 13 OTU arrived with their de Havilland Mosquitoes and the airfield reverted to being a satellite of RAF Harwell.

The following units also were here at some point:

- Detachment of No. 42 OTU (June 1944)
- No. 1516 (Beam Approach Training) Flight RAF (December 1942 - April 1943)
- No. 1526 (Beam Approach Training) Flight RAF (February - November 1944)
- Operational and Refresher Training Unit RAF

It became an ammunition storage depot as part of the Bramley Central Ammunition Depot near Basingstoke after its closure in 1946.

== Enemy action ==
The site was bombed on 16 September 1940 by the Luftwaffe in the Battle of Britain. Three bombs fell on the runways.

On 4 March 1941 a Wellington was attacked by a German fighter as it approached to land.

The airfield was attacked on 12 May 1941 with 10 High Explosive bombs and 100 Incendiaries. One Wellington was destroyed and the flare path and the southern taxiway were damaged.

== Current use ==
Little of the wartime station now remains. There are four remaining pillboxes and some air raid shelters in the woods. Part of the bomb storage site remains also. The site still maintains a modern link with aviation with a farm strip used by a Tiger Moth biplane. A light beacon is also situated on the edge of an old airfield peri track as the site is under the flightpath of aircraft flying to and from Heathrow airport on Airway Green One. An important VOR beacon, Compton (CPT), is also located here. It is now known as Haw Farm, part of the Yattendon Estate.
