= Enstone Airfield =

Civilian airfield in Oxfordshire, England

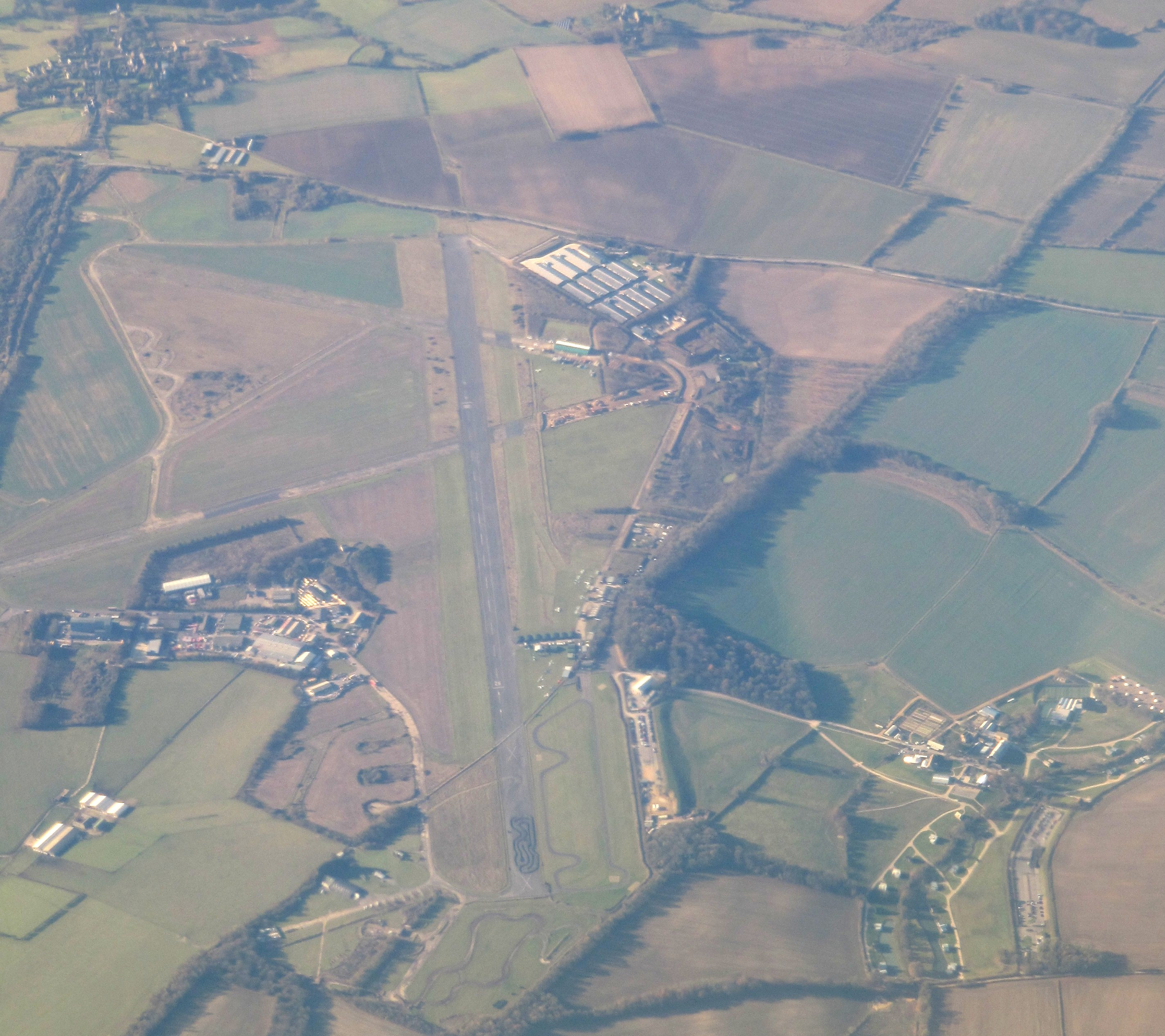
- IATA: none; ICAO: EGTN

Summary
- Owner/Operator: Oxfordshire Sport Flying
- Location: Enstone, Oxfordshire, England
- Opened: 15 September 1942
- Coordinates: 51°55′47″N 01°25′39″W

Map
- Shown with Oxfordshire

Runways
Direction	Length		Surface
Direction	ft	m	Surface
08/26	2,587	1,100	Concrete

Enstone Aerodrome is a small unlicensed civilian airfield in England close to Enstone in Oxfordshire, which is currently used for microlights, light aircraft and motor gliders. The International Civil Aviation Organization (ICAO) designator is EGTN, and its contact radio frequency is 129.880. The Aerodrome Operators are Oxfordshire Sport Flying located close to the Runway 26 Threshold.

The aerodrome, 4.5 nautical miles east of Chipping Norton, has an asphalt paved main runway: 08/26, which is 1100 metres long, consisting of a tarmac surface over concrete base. There is also a parallel grass strip "south side grass" of 800 metres which can be made available to some aircraft.

== History ==
The aerodrome was built during the Second World War as a then typical triangular three-runway Royal Air Force Bomber Command airfield.

The aerodrome opened 15 September 1942 as RAF Enstone. It started life as a satellite airfield for RAF Moreton-in-Marsh, and was used by Vickers Wellingtons of No. 21 Operational Training Unit RAF until April 1944. A detachment of North American Harvards and Airspeed Oxfords of No. 17 Flying Training School RAF subsequently arrived at Enstone; these departed during December 1946, and RAF Enstone eventually closed in 1947.

The site was also used by:

- No. 1 Refresher School RAF
- No. 7 Maintenance Unit RAF
- No. 1682 Bomber Defence Training Flight RAF
- Central Flying School

== Current use ==
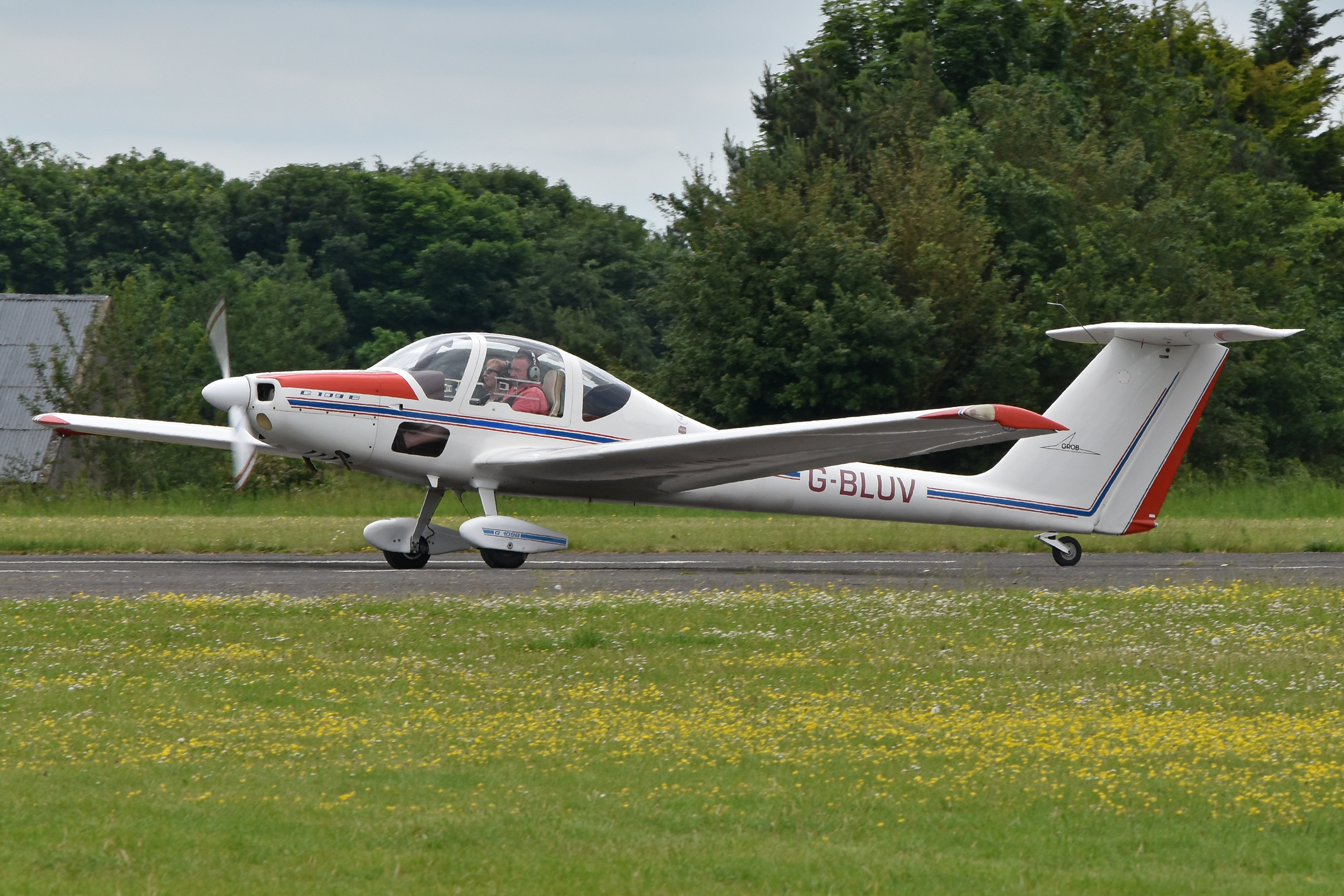
Grob G 109B at Enstone Airfield

It is currently used for general aviation (GA). The hard runway is run by Oxfordshire Sport Flying Limited who provide flying lessons over Oxfordshire in modern motor gliders. The aerodrome is operational during daylight hours.

The Northside Grass Runway is run by Enstone Airlines. Enstone Airlines also provide maintenance for aircraft. In addition to aviation activities, the aerodrome is also home to a number of industrial activities, including automotive and general engineering, and accordingly, the site is also known as Enstone Airfield Industrial Estate. Northside Grass Runway is also used for GA and provides flying lessons to all who wish to learn to fly.

It was used in 2018 as the race track for the 'Celebrity Face Off' segment of the British motoring show The Grand Tour.

The site has been mooted for a classic-car museum, founded by American collector and philanthropist Peter W. Mullin. Plans for the museum were approved by West Oxfordshire District Council in 2019, although in 2022 Mullin submitted altered plans, which are still awaiting approval.

== See also ==
- List of airports in the United Kingdom
- List of former Royal Air Force stations
