= RAF Stanton Harcourt =

RAF Stanton Harcourt
- Stanton Harcourt, Oxfordshire in England

Site information
- Type: Royal Air Force Satellite station
- Owner: Air Ministry
- Operator: Royal Air Force

Location
- Shown within Oxfordshire
- Coordinates: 51°44′31″N 001°24′33″W

Site history
- Built: 1940
- In use: 1940-1946

Airfield information
- Elevation: 67 metres (220 ft) AMSL
Runways
Direction	Length and surface
00/00	Concrete
00/00	Concrete
00/00	Concrete

Royal Air Force Stanton Harcourt or more simply RAF Stanton Harcourt is a former Royal Air Force satellite station located 4.4 miles (7.1 km) southeast of Witney, Oxfordshire and 6.6 miles (10.6 km) west of Oxford, Oxfordshire, UK.

== Units ==
The following units were here at some point:

- No. 10 Operational Training Unit RAF
- No. 20 OTU
- No. 1341 (Special Duties) Flight RAF
- No. 1501 (Beam Approach Training) Flight RAF
- No. 1682 (Bomber) Defence Training Flight RAF

During the Second World War it was a satellite aerodrome for RAF Abingdon, to where No. 10 OTU crews would be sent once initial training was completed at Abingdon.

== Current use ==
The site is now used for light industrial work and gravel pits. It's now been developed into a housing estate with most original buildings destroyed.

== See also ==
- List of former Royal Air Force stations
