= RAF Elgin =

Former Royal Air Force airfield in Moray, Scotland

RAF Elgin
- Near Miltonduff, Elgin, Moray in Scotland
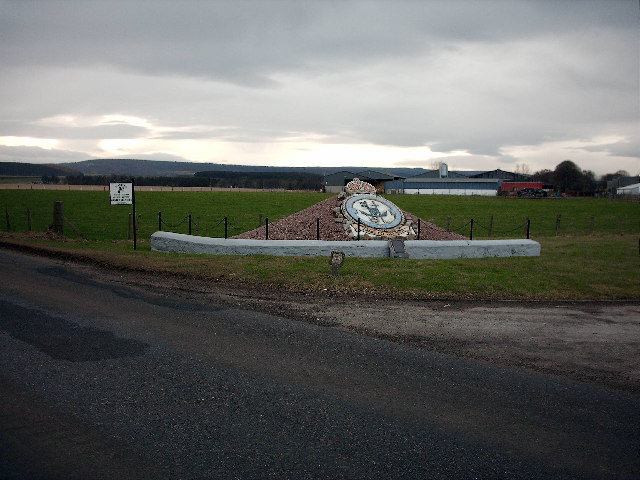
- The site of RAF Elgin during 2006, including the No. 20 Operational Training unit memorial

Site information
- Type: Royal Air Force satellite station
- Owner: Air Ministry
- Operator: Royal Air Force
- Controlled by: RAF Bomber Command: No. 2 Group RAF; No. 6 (T) Group RAF; No. 91 (OTU) Group RAF

Location
- Location in Moray RAF Elgin (the United Kingdom)
- Coordinates: 57°37′31.5″N 3°20′57.1″W

Site history
- Built: 1940
- Built by: Royal Engineers
- In use: June 1940 – 1947
- Fate: Returned to agricultural use
- Battles/wars: European theatre of World War II

Airfield information
- Elevation: 30 metres (98 ft) AMSL
Runways
Direction	Length and surface
N/S	1,280 metres (4,199 ft) Grass
E/W	1,143 metres (3,750 ft) Grass
SE/NW	1,005 metres (3,297 ft) Grass

Royal Air Force Elgin or more simply RAF Elgin also known as Bogs of Mayne is a former Royal Air Force satellite station located approximately 1.5 kilometres (0.93 miles) south west of Elgin in Moray, Scotland. It opened in 1940 as a satellite airfield of RAF Lossiemouth and was used throughout the Second World War, predominantly by bomber aircraft of No. 20 Operational Training Unit. Towards the end of the war it was used by No. 46 Maintenance Unit, before it closed in 1947. The site was returned to agricultural use, although several airfield buildings and a memorial remain.

== History ==
=== Establishment ===
RAF Elgin was built as a satellite landing ground (SLG) for RAF Lossiemouth which was approximately 8.85 kilometres (5.50 miles) to the north. Construction work was undertaken by the Royal Engineers and the site opened in early June 1940.

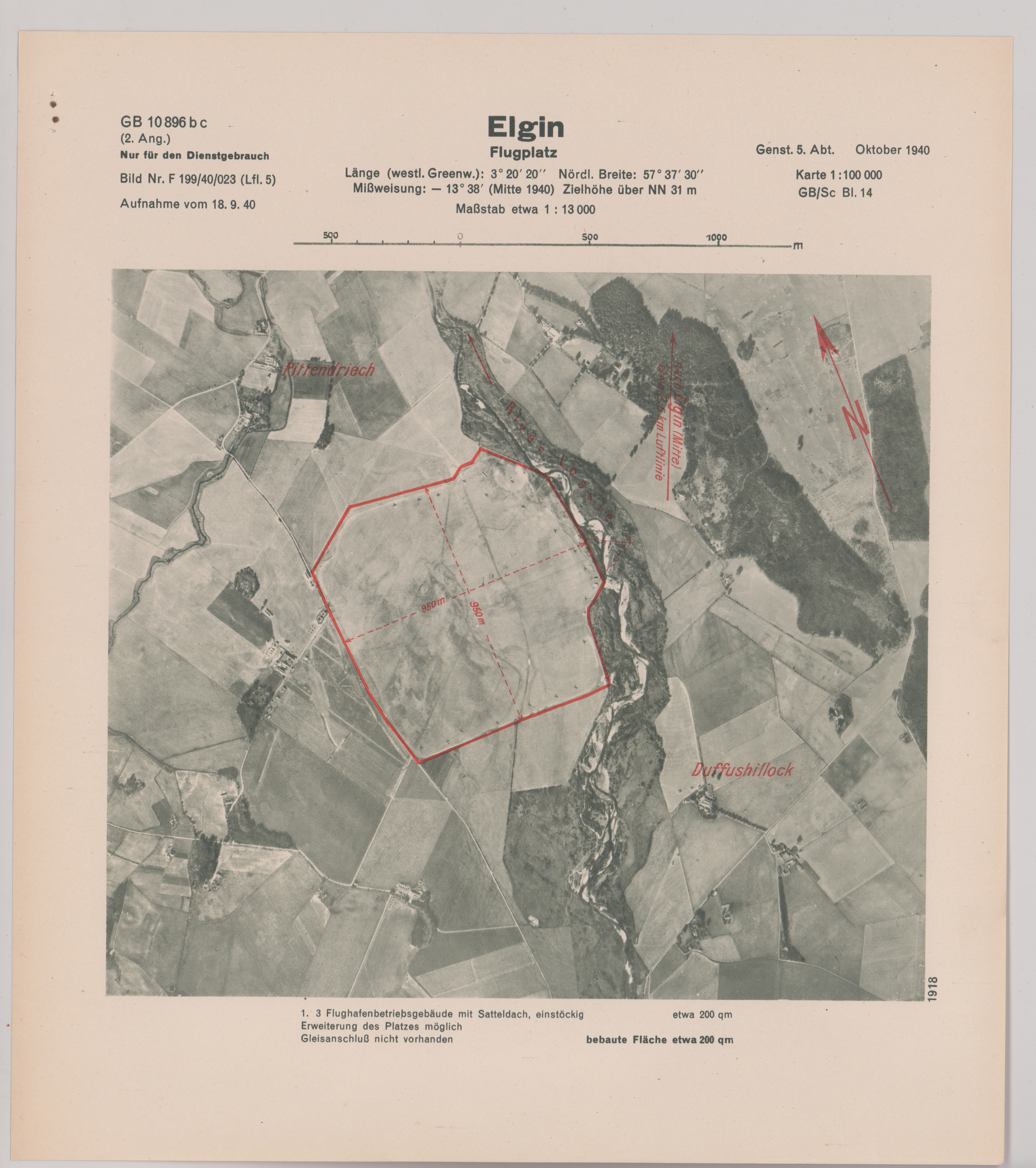
RAF Elgin on a target dossier of the German Luftwaffe, 1940

The airfield was located approximately 1.5 kilometres (0.93 miles) south west of Elgin in Moray. It was situated on agricultural land known as Bogs of Mayne, situated between the River Lossie to the east and the B9010 Elgin to Forres road to the west. The main site extended to 180.5 hectares (446 acres), with a further 6.50 hectares (16.1 acres) used for domestic accommodation and administrative buildings, between Wester Manbeen Cottages and Miltonduff. The airfield had three grass runways: north/south (1,280 metres (4,200 ft) in length), east/west (1,143 meters (3,750 ft)) and south east/north west (1,005 meters (3,297 ft)). Two hangars were located at the south west side of the airfield, a B1 and a T2 type, and a bomb store was located to the south of the north–south runway. Twenty concrete hard-standings for the parking of aircraft were created around the northern and western boundaries. The airfield was unusual in that it had its own water works, consisting of dam across a stream and an underground pumping station.

=== Operations ===
Due to the threat of invasion by Nazi Germany, when completed the airfield was obstructed by the Royal Engineers to prevent enemy landings. Once the threat reduced, the first flying unit arrived on 13 August, when No. 57 Squadron relocated from RAF Lossiemouth to create space for the expansion of No. 20 Operational Training Unit (No. 20 OTU). The squadron operated the Bristol Blenheim light-bomber in the anti-shipping role. It moved to RAF Wyton in November. During this period, the airfield was also used by Lossiemouth-based Blenheims belonging to No. 21 Squadron, as well as Westland Lysanders of No. 614 Squadron operating from RAF Longman on coastal patrols.

On 26 October, RAF Lossiemouth was attacked by three Heinkel He 111 of the Luftwaffe. To protect the area from further attacks, Hawker Hurricanes of No. 232 Squadron were deployed to RAF Elgin from RAF Skitten. The Hurricanes carried out air defence duties until April 1941, when they moved to RAF Montrose without having encountered any enemy aircraft. They were replaced by detachments of Hurricanes from No. 17 Squadron, normally based at RAF Sumburgh and RAF Castleton.

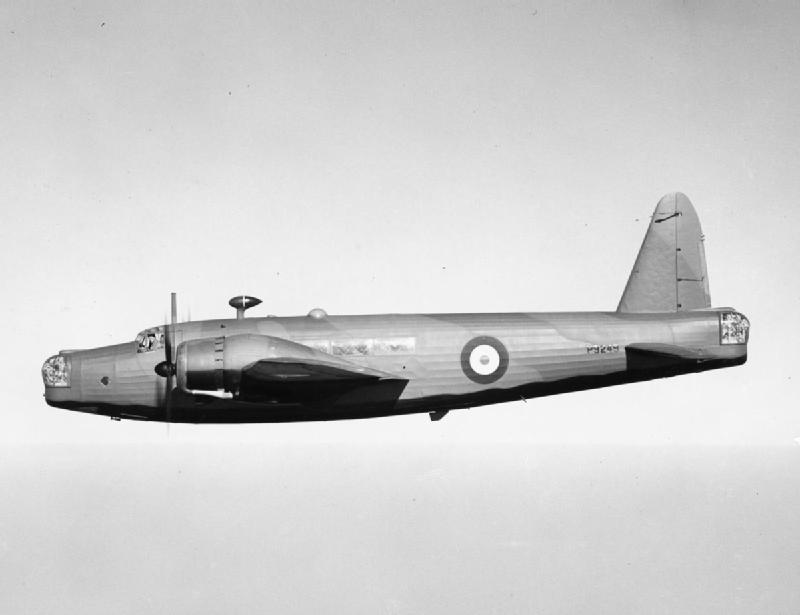
A Vickers Wellington of the type flown by No. 20 Operational Training Unit

A-Flight of No. 20 OTU, equipped with the Vickers Wellington medium-bomber, began using RAF Elgin for training on 18 April. Flying continued throughout 1941 and 1942, with the airfield predominantly used by the unit's Wellington and Avro Anson training aircraft. Armstrong Whitworth Whitley medium-bombers belonging to No. 19 OTU based at nearby RAF Kinloss also occasionally visited. Wellingtons of No. 20 OTU were also involved in strategic bombing raids on German cities during 1942, the training aircraft being required to help reach the target number of 1,000 bombers per raid. No. 19 (Pilots) Advanced Flying Unit from RAF Dalcross used the airfield during 1943, flying the Airspeed Oxford training aircraft.

1944 saw the peak of activity, with 1,087 RAF personnel and 234 members of the Women's Auxiliary Air Force based at the airfield.

To improve aircraft manoeuvring area surfaces, some areas of the airfield benefited from bar and rod tracking. However, the combination of ground conditions and the high frequency of flying led to drainage problems. To address the issue, a full bar and rod system was installed by No. 5016 Airfield Construction Squadron in 1944, with further work undertaken in March 1945.

=== Draw-down and closure ===
On 28 July 1944, No. 46 Maintenance Unit became the primary user of the airfield when No. 105 Sub Storage Unit was established. The unit was tasked with the storage of Avro Lancaster bombers and North American Harvard trainer aircraft. After the end of hostilities in Europe, the airfield was placed into a care and maintenance status on 24 June 1945. In January 1947, No. 105 SSU transferred to No. 45 Maintenance Unit, based at RAF Kinloss. RAF Elgin closed later that year.

== No. 20 Operational Training Unit memorial ==
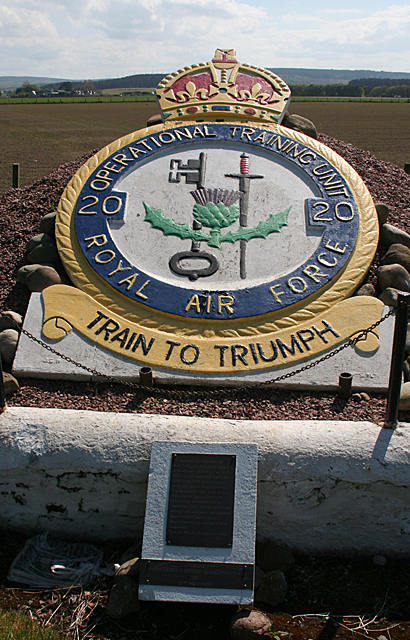
No. 20 Operational Training unit memorial during 2012

During 1943, No. 20 Operational Training Unit was awarded its heraldic badge. A concrete version of the badge was created and still remains at the site of RAF Elgin. A concrete badge was also present at RAF Lossiemouth, but it is unknown whether this was the same badge as is now present at the RAF Elgin site, having potentially been relocated when control of RAF Lossiemouth transferred to the Fleet Air Arm in 1946. The badge has been in its current position since 1968, when it was relocated by the farmer of the surrounding land. A plaque was added in 1992 which states: (Note: The memorial plaque states the airfield closed during 1946, whereas other sources indicate a closure year of 1947.)

Erected on the site of R.A.F. Elgin (Bogs of Mayne) a satellite airfield for Nº 20 O.T.U. Lossiemouth between 1940 and 1945. Wellington aircraft used this airfield for training and also as a departure point for the thousand bomber raids summer 1942. Other aircraft using the airfield included Blenheims, Whitleys, Hurricanes, Lysanders and Oxfords. The airfield closed in 1946. PLAQUE PRESENTED BY RAF LOSSIEMOUTH ON 15TH MAY 1992

— No. 20 Operational Training Unit memorial

== Post-military use ==
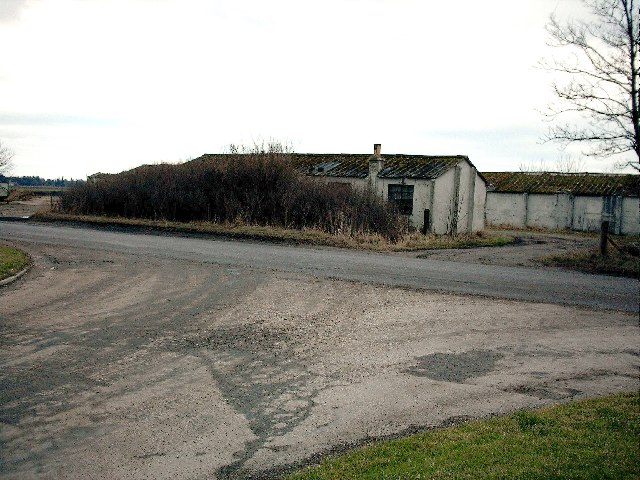
Former airfield buildings adjacent to the B9010 road during 2006

The airfield was returned to agricultural use after its closure in 1947. The main airfield buildings such as hangars and the control tower have been demolished as have the perimeter tracks. Two brick and concrete buildings thought to be used for motor transport and engineering repairs exist on the east side of the B9010 road, with a third being demolished in 2016 to allow construction of an agricultural shed. Other buildings, both intact and ruined, exist within surrounding fields and woodland, including a former decontamination building.

Part of the former airfield is now used as a sand and gravel quarry, operated by Tarmac and known as Cloddach Quarry.

== See also ==
- List of former Royal Air Force stations
