= RAF Forres =

RAF Forres
- Forres, Moray in Scotland

Site information
- Type: Royal Air Force satellite station
- Owner: Air Ministry
- Operator: Royal Air Force
- Controlled by: RAF Bomber Command * No. 6 (T) Group RAF * No. 91 (OTU) Group RAF

Location
- Shown within Moray RAF Forres (the United Kingdom)
- Coordinates: 57°35′53″N 3°38′32″W

Site history
- Built: 1939/40
- In use: April 1940 - October 1944
- Battles/wars: European theatre of World War II

Airfield information
- Elevation: 15 metres (49 ft) AMSL
Runways
Direction	Length and surface
00/00	Grass
00/00	Grass

Royal Air Force Forres or more simply RAF Forres is a former Royal Air Force satellite station located between Mundole Estate and Forres, Moray, Scotland. The station was controlled by RAF Lossiemouth.

RAF Forres also had a training strip located between the River Findhorn and Mundole Estate. The training strip is still visible from satellite imagery, and a hangar from the original strip still remains standing.

The following units were here at some point:

- Satellite airfield of No. 19 Operational Training Unit RAF (21 January 1941 - 22 October 1944)
- Relief Landing Ground of No. 19 (Pilots) Advanced Flying Unit RAF (25 May 1943 - 20 November 1943)
