= RAF Moreton-in-Marsh =

Former RAF station in Gloucestershire, England

RAF Moreton-in-Marsh
- Near Moreton-in-Marsh, Gloucestershire in England
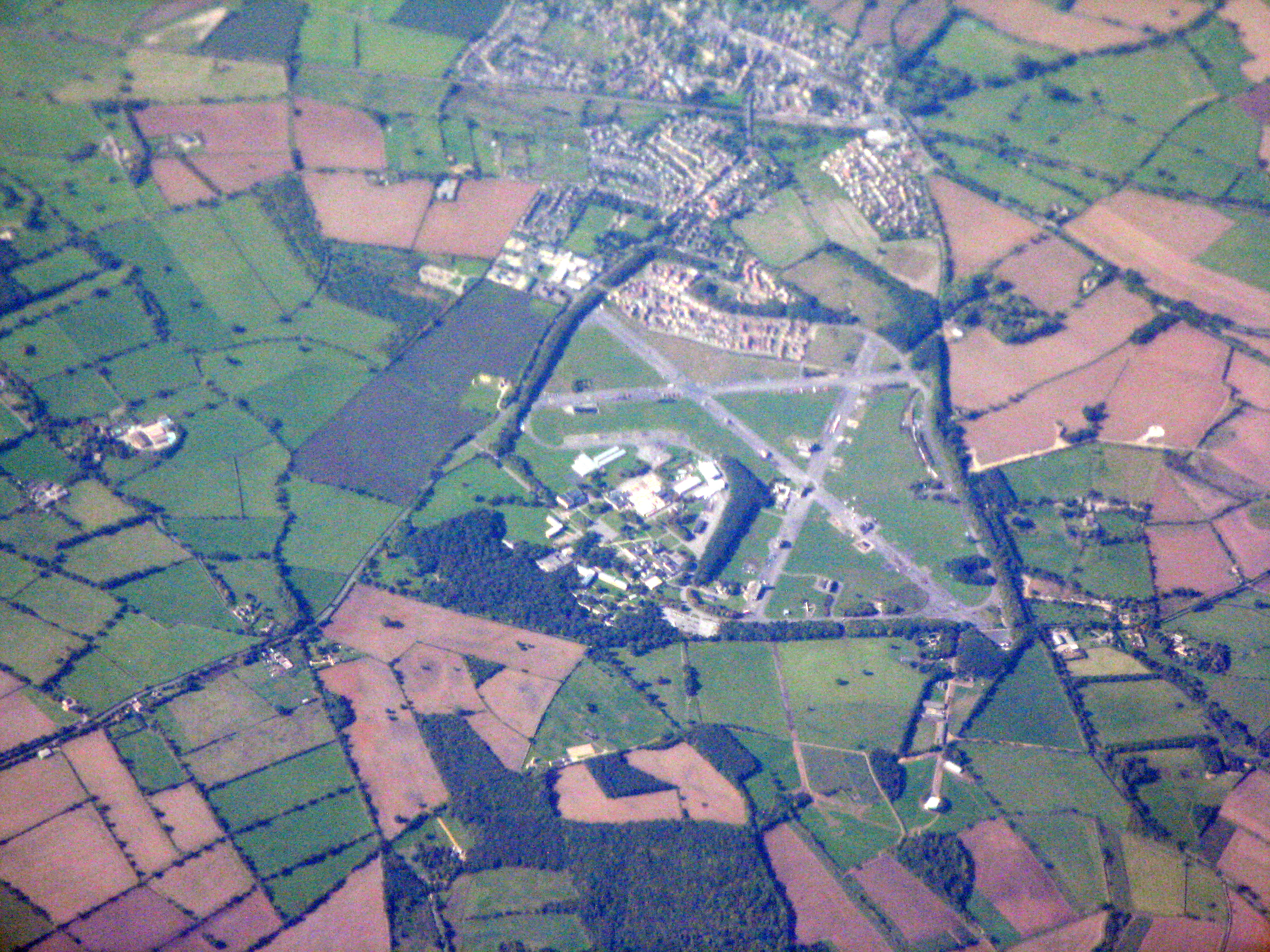
- The Fire Service Technical College on the old airfield site

Site information
- Type: Royal Air Force Station
- Owner: Air Ministry
- Operator: Royal Air Force
- Controlled by: RAF Flying Training Command

Location
- Shown within Gloucestershire RAF Moreton-in-Marsh (the United Kingdom)
- Coordinates: 51°59′42″N 001°40′48″W

Site history
- Built: 1940
- In use: 1941 - 1955
- Battles/wars: European theatre of World War II

Airfield information
Runways
| Direction | Length and surface |
|---|---|
| 00/00 | Asphalt |
| 00/00 | Asphalt |
| 00/00 | Asphalt |

Royal Air Force Moreton-in-Marsh or more simply RAF Moreton-in-Marsh is a former Royal Air Force station near Moreton-in-Marsh, Gloucestershire, England. It was opened in November 1940 with three concrete and tarmac runways and five aircraft hangars. It closed for operational flying in early 1948. The base remained in use as a relief runway and for training. After a period of care and maintenance, the Station was handed over to the Home Office in 1955.

The town's environs are quite flat and low-lying although it is situated at the northern extremity of the Cotswold Hills range. During the Second World War, a large area of this flat land to the east of the town was developed as an airfield and became the base of No. 21 Operational Training Unit RAF (OTU), flying mainly Vickers Wellington bombers. It is highly likely that the airfield inspired the title of the radio comedy series Much Binding in the Marsh. Two of the programme's stars, Kenneth Horne and Richard Murdoch, had served there as flying instructors.

== Units ==
The following units were also here at some point:

- No. 1 Flying Training School RAF
- No. 1 (Pilot) Refresher Flying Unit RAF
- No. 1 Refresher School RAF
- No. 21 (Pilots) Advanced Flying Unit RAF
- No. 55 Operational Training Unit RAF
- No. 311 Ferry Training Unit RAF
- No. 1446 (Ferry Training) Flight RAF
- Central Flying School

== Current use ==
The former airfield is now home to the Fire Service College where senior fire officers from brigades all over the UK undergo operational, management and leadership training.
